= 2020 Santos FC season =

Santos
2020 season
- President: José Carlos Peres (until 28 September); Orlando Rollo (29 September – 31 December); Andrés Rueda (Since 1 January 2021)
- Coach: Jesualdo Ferreira (until 5 August 2020) Cuca (7 August 2020 – 21 February 2021) Marcelo Fernandes (caretaker 25 February 2021)
- Stadium: Vila Belmiro
- Campeonato Brasileiro: 8th
- Campeonato Paulista: Quarter-finals
- Copa do Brasil: Round of 16
- Copa Libertadores: Runners-up
- Top goalscorer: League: Marinho (17); All: Marinho (24)
- Highest home attendance: 20,371 vs Palmeiras (29 February)
- Lowest home attendance: 3,504 vs Botafogo–SP (10 February) (Ignoring matches behind closed doors)
Home colours	Away colours	Third colours

The 2020 season is Santos Futebol Clube's 108th season in existence and the club's sixty-first consecutive season in the top flight of Brazilian football. As well as the Campeonato Brasileiro, the club competes in the Copa do Brasil, the Campeonato Paulista and also in Copa Libertadores.

On 22 November, José Carlos Peres was impeached from the presidency of the club, and Orlando Rollo (the former vice-president) assumed the position until the end of his term. José Carlos Peres had been out of office since 28 September.

== Players ==
=== Squad information ===
As of 26 February 2021

No.	Name	Pos.	Nat.	Place of Birth	Date of Birth (Age)	Club caps	Club goals	Int. caps	Int. goals	Signed from	Date signed	Fee	Contract End
Goalkeepers
1	Vladimir	GK	(Brazil)	Ipiaú (Bahia)	16 July 1989 (aged 31)	69	0	–	–	Youth System	1 January 2009	Free	31 December 2021
31	John Victor	GK	(Brazil)	Diadema (São Paulo (state))	13 February 1996 (aged 25)	16	0	–	–	Youth System	15 January 2016	Free	31 December 2023
33	Paulo Mazoti	GK	(Brazil)	Ribeirão Pires (São Paulo (state))	11 July 2000 (aged 20)	–	–	–	–	Youth System	13 November 2020	Free	31 December 2021
34	João Paulo	GK	(Brazil)	Dourados (Mato Grosso do Sul)	29 June 1995 (aged 25)	36	0	–	–	Youth System	26 February 2014	Free	31 August 2025
Defenders
2	Luiz Felipe	CB	(Brazil)	Tubarão (Santa Catarina (state))	9 October 1993 (aged 27)	115	4	–	–	Paraná	17 February 2016	R$ 1M	31 December 2024
3	Felipe Jonatan	LB	(Brazil)	Fortaleza (Ceará)	15 February 1998 (aged 23)	94	4	–	–	Ceará	1 March 2019	R$ 6M	28 February 2025
4	Pará	RB	(Brazil)	São João do Araguaia (Pará)	14 February 1986 (aged 35)	252	2	–	–	Flamengo	1 August 2019	Free	31 December 2022
6	Laércio	CB	(Brazil)	Marau (Rio Grande do Sul)	2 April 1994 (aged 26)	16	1	–	–	Caxias	9 October 2020	Free	31 December 2021
13	Madson	RB	(Brazil)	Itaparica (Bahia)	13 January 1992 (aged 29)	39	5	–	–	Grêmio	14 December 2019	Swap	31 December 2022
14	Luan Peres	CB/LB	(Brazil)	São Paulo (São Paulo (state))	19 July 1994 (aged 26)	64	0	–	–	Club Brugge (Belgium)	1 August 2019	Loan	23 January 2021
18	Fernando Pileggi	RB	(Brazil)	São Paulo (São Paulo (state))	6 July 1999 (aged 21)	2	0	–	–	Youth System	1 June 2018	Free	31 December 2021
35	Derick	CB	(Brazil)	Santos (São Paulo (state))	16 May 2002 (aged 18)	1	0	–	–	Youth System	8 September 2020	Free	30 September 2021
40	Wellington Tim	CB/LB	(Brazil)	Rio de Janeiro (Rio de Janeiro (state))	5 June 2001 (aged 19)	2	0	–	–	Youth System	21 January 2021	Loan	31 December 2021
42	Wagner Leonardo	CB/LB	(Brazil)	Praia Grande (São Paulo (state))	23 July 1999 (aged 21)	17	0	–	–	Youth System	21 February 2019	Free	31 August 2024
44	Alex	CB	(Brazil)	Ribeirão Preto (São Paulo (state))	10 May 1999 (aged 21)	13	0	–	–	Fluminense	7 May 2019	Free	31 December 2024
Midfielders
5	Alison	DM	(Brazil)	Cubatão (São Paulo (state))	1 March 1993 (aged 27)	246	4	–	–	Youth System	9 September 2011	Free	4 December 2022
7	Pato Sánchez	CM/AM	(Uruguay)	Montevideo	2 December 1984 (aged 36)	104	25	38	1	Monterrey (Mexico)	23 July 2018	Free	22 July 2021
8	Jobson	DM	(Brazil)	São Paulo (São Paulo (state))	13 September 1995 (aged 25)	40	3	–	–	Red Bull Brasil	18 April 2019	R$ 4M	15 April 2024
17	Vinicius Balieiro	DM	(Brazil)	Campinas (São Paulo (state))	28 May 1999 (aged 21)	15	0	–	–	Youth System	13 November 2020	Free	30 April 2022
20	Gabriel Pirani	AM/SS	(Brazil)	Penápolis (São Paulo (state))	12 April 2002 (aged 18)	1	0	–	–	Youth System	13 November 2020	Free	31 December 2022
25	Guilherme Nunes	DM	(Brazil)	Novo Hamburgo (Rio Grande do Sul)	12 February 1998 (aged 23)	11	0	–	–	Youth System	5 February 2018	Free	29 April 2023
37	Lucas Lourenço	AM	(Brazil)	Santos (São Paulo (state))	23 January 2001 (aged 20)	23	0	–	–	Youth System	1 December 2018	Free	31 December 2024
38	Sandry	DM/CM	(Brazil)	Itabuna (Bahia)	30 August 2002 (aged 18)	32	0	–	–	Youth System	18 January 2019	Free	31 July 2022
41	Jean Mota	AM/LB	(Brazil)	São Paulo (São Paulo (state))	15 October 1993 (aged 27)	209	17	–	–	Fortaleza	9 June 2016	Free	30 June 2022
45	Ivonei	CM/AM	(Brazil)	Rondonópolis (Mato Grosso)	16 April 2002 (aged 18)	14	1	–	–	Youth System	12 July 2019	Free	31 July 2025
Forwards
9	Kaio Jorge	ST	(Brazil)	Olinda (Pernambuco)	24 January 2002 (aged 19)	56	9	–	–	Youth System	21 September 2018	Free	31 December 2021
10	Yeferson Soteldo	LW/AM	(Venezuela)	Acarigua	30 June 1997 (aged 23)	97	19	19	1	Huachipato (Chile)	22 January 2019	R$ 13M	31 December 2023
11	Marinho	SS	(Brazil)	Penedo (Alagoas)	29 May 1990 (aged 30)	71	32	–	–	Grêmio	24 May 2019	R$ 4M	31 December 2022
12	Raniel	ST	(Brazil)	Recife (Pernambuco)	11 June 1996 (aged 24)	14	2	–	–	São Paulo	13 December 2019	Swap	31 December 2023
16	Jonathan Copete	LW/SS	(Colombia)	Cali	23 January 1988 (aged 33)	136	26	2	0	Atlético Nacional (Colombia)	23 June 2016	R$ 5M	18 June 2021
19	Bruno Marques	ST	(Brazil)	Recife (Pernambuco)	22 February 1999 (aged 22)	18	3	–	–	Youth System	13 November 2020	Loan	28 February 2021
23	Arthur Gomes	SS	(Brazil)	Uberlândia (Minas Gerais)	3 July 1998 (aged 22)	97	11	–	–	Youth System	2 September 2016	Free	30 December 2021
27	Ângelo Gabriel	SS	(Brazil)	Brasília (Federal District (Brazil))	21 December 2004 (aged 16)	9	0	–	–	Youth System	22 October 2020	Trainee	31 December 2021
29	Allanzinho	FW	(Brazil)	Bertioga (São Paulo (state))	4 April 2000 (aged 20)	1	0	–	–	Youth System	15 July 2020	Free	31 December 2024
30	Lucas Braga	SS	(Brazil)	São Paulo (São Paulo (state))	10 November 1996 (aged 24)	41	4	–	–	Luverdense	5 June 2019	Free	31 May 2022
36	Marcos Leonardo	ST	(Brazil)	Itapetinga (Bahia)	3 May 2003 (aged 17)	22	5	–	–	Youth System	21 July 2020	Free	22 October 2022
39	Tailson	SS/AM	(Brazil)	Santo André (São Paulo (state))	5 March 1999 (aged 21)	29	1	–	–	Youth System	18 January 2019	Free	31 July 2024
43	Renyer	SS	(Brazil)	Rio de Janeiro (Rio de Janeiro (state))	12 July 2003 (aged 17)	4	0	–	–	Youth System	23 January 2020	Free	30 November 2023

Source: SantosFC.com.br (for appearances and goals), Wikipedia players' articles (for international appearances and goals), FPF (for contracts). Players in italic are not registered for the Campeonato Paulista

=== Copa Libertadores squad ===
- Players in ~~strike~~ are no longer in the squad
- Players in italic were included in the last submission

Note: Flags indicate national team as defined under FIFA eligibility rules; some limited exceptions apply. Players may hold more than one non-FIFA nationality.

No.	Pos.	Nation	Player
1	GK	BRA	Vladimir
2	DF	BRA	Luiz Felipe
3	DF	BRA	Felipe Jonatan
4	DF	BRA	Pará
5	MF	BRA	Alison
6	DF	BRA	Wagner Leonardo
7	MF	BRA	Kevin Malthus (Note: Replaced Carlos Sánchez)
8	MF	BRA	Jobson
9	MF	BRA	Gabriel Pirani (Note: Replaced Lucas Venuto)
10	MF	VEN	Yeferson Soteldo
11	FW	BRA	Marinho
12	FW	BRA	Raniel
13	DF	BRA	Madson
14	DF	BRA	Luan Peres
15	FW	BRA	Renyer
16	FW	BRA	Tailson
17	MF	BRA	Jean Mota
18	MF	BRA	Sandry
19	FW	BRA	Kaio Jorge
20	DF	BRA	Laércio (Note: Replaced Fernando Uribe)
21	MF	BRA	Diego Pituca
22	MF	BRA	Guilherme Nunes (Note: Replaced Everson)
23	FW	BRA	Arthur Gomes
24	GK	BRA	John Victor
25	DF	BRA	Fernando Pileggi (Note: Replaced Evandro)

No.	Pos.	Nation	Player
26	MF	BRA	Vinicius Balieiro (Note: Replaced Felipe Aguilar)
27	DF	BRA	Wellington Tim (Note: Replaced Lucas Sena, who previously replaced Eduardo Sasha)
28	DF	BRA	Lucas Veríssimo
29	DF	BRA	Derick (Note: Replaced Yuri Alberto)
30	GK	BRA	João Paulo
31	DF	BRA	Alex
32	FW	BRA	Allanzinho
33	FW	BRA	Bruno Marques
34	FW	BRA	Andrey Quintino (Note: Replaced Anderson Ceará)
35	MF	BRA	Ivonei
36	FW	BRA	Lucas Braga
37	MF	BRA	Lucas Lourenço
38	FW	BRA	Marcos Leonardo
39	FW	BRA	Matheus Moraes
40	GK	BRA	Paulo Mazoti
41	FW	BRA	Brayan Krüger (Note: Replaced Andrey Quintino)
42	DF	BRA	Mikael Doka
43	FW	BRA	Ângelo Gabriel (Note: Replaced Donizete)
44	MF	BRA	Felipe Pereira
45	DF	BRA	Gustavo Cipriano
46	DF	BRA	Jhonnathan
47	MF	BRA	Lucas Barbosa
48	GK	BRA	Matheus Saldanha
49	DF	BRA	Robson Reis
50	FW	BRA	Wesley Santos

Notes

Source: Conmebol.com

=== Appearances and goals ===
No.	Pos.	Nat	Name	Campeonato Brasileiro		Campeonato Paulista		Copa Libertadores		Copa do Brasil		Total	
No.	Pos.	Nat	Name	Apps	Goals	Apps	Goals	Apps	Goals	Apps	Goals	Apps	Goals
22	GK	(Brazil)	Everson	0	0	9	0	2	0	0	0	11	0
34	GK	(Brazil)	João Paulo	25+1	0	0	0	5	0	2	0	33	0
31	GK	(Brazil)	John Victor	9	0	0	0	6	0	0	0	15	0
1	GK	(Brazil)	Vladimir	4	0	4	0	0	0	0	0	8	0
3	DF	(Brazil)	Felipe Jonatan	32+1	2	13	0	12+1	0	2	0	61	2
18	DF	(Brazil)	Fernando Pileggi	2	0	0	0	0	0	0	0	2	0
13	DF	(Brazil)	Madson	14+12	5	1+2	0	2+6	0	2	0	39	5
4	DF	(Brazil)	Pará	24+3	0	12+1	0	12	0	0+1	0	53	0
44	DF	(Brazil)	Alex	7+4	0	0	0	1+1	0	0	0	13	0
35	DF	(Brazil)	Derick	0+1	0	0	0	0	0	0	0	1	0
6	DF	(Brazil)	Laércio	12+2	0	0	0	0+2	1	0	0	16	1
14	DF	(Brazil)	Luan Peres	27+2	0	13	0	11	0	2	0	55	0
28	DF	(Brazil)	Lucas Veríssimo	16	1	7	0	11	1	1	0	35	2
2	DF	(Brazil)	Luiz Felipe	12+1	0	6+1	0	3	0	1+1	0	25	0
42	DF	(Brazil)	Wagner Leonardo	5+7	0	0	0	0+4	0	0	0	16	0
40	DF	(Brazil)	Wellington Tim	0+1	0	0	0	0+1	0	0	0	2	0
5	MF	(Brazil)	Alison	18+2	0	8+1	0	7+2	0	0	0	38	0
40	MF	(Brazil)	Anderson Ceará	0+1	0	0+1	0	0	0	0	0	2	0
21	MF	(Brazil)	Diego Pituca	26+1	1	13	1	12	1	2	0	54	3
25	MF	(Brazil)	Evandro	0	0	1+2	0	1+1	0	0	0	5	0
20	MF	(Brazil)	Gabriel Pirani	0+1	0	0	0	0	0	0	0	1	0
25	MF	(Brazil)	Guilherme Nunes	2+2	0	0	0	0+1	0	0	0	5	0
45	MF	(Brazil)	Ivonei	3+10	1	0	0	0+1	0	0	0	14	1
41	MF	(Brazil)	Jean Mota	14+15	1	1+5	0	2+5	1	2	0	44	2
8	MF	(Brazil)	Jobson	14+5	2	5+3	0	5+2	1	2	0	36	3
37	MF	(Brazil)	Lucas Lourenço	1+16	0	0	0	0+4	0	0+1	0	22	0
7	MF	(Uruguay)	Pato Sánchez	10+2	0	10+1	1	5	1	0	0	28	2
38	MF	(Brazil)	Sandry	12+6	0	1+1	0	3+4	0	0+2	0	29	0
17	MF	(Brazil)	Vinicius Balieiro	7+5	0	0	0	0+3	0	0	0	15	0
29	FW	(Brazil)	Allazinho	0+1	0	0	0	0	0	0	0	1	0
27	FW	(Brazil)	Ângelo Gabriel	1+8	0	0	0	0	0	0	0	9	0
23	FW	(Brazil)	Arthur Gomes	16+6	2	4+6	2	2+1	0	0+1	0	36	4
19	FW	(Brazil)	Bruno Marques	2+13	3	0	0	0+3	0	0	0	18	3
17	FW	(Paraguay)	Derlis González	0	0	0+1	0	0	0	0	0	1	0
27	FW	(Brazil)	Eduardo Sasha	0	0	8	2	2	0	0	0	10	2
20	FW	(Colombia)	Fernando Uribe	0+1	0	2+2	0	0	0	0	0	5	0
9	FW	(Brazil)	Kaio Jorge	23+5	4	4+3	0	11+1	5	1	0	48	9
30	FW	(Brazil)	Lucas Braga	24+6	2	0	0	5+4	2	1+1	0	41	4
37	FW	(Brazil)	Lucas Venuto	0	0	0+1	0	0	0	0	0	1	0
36	FW	(Brazil)	Marcos Leonardo	7+11	4	0	0	0+3	1	0+1	0	22	5
11	FW	(Brazil)	Marinho	24+3	17	3+1	3	10	4	2	0	43	24
12	FW	(Brazil)	Raniel	3+1	0	5+2	2	1+2	0	0	0	14	2
43	FW	(Brazil)	Renyer	0+1	0	0+3	0	0	0	0	0	4	0
39	FW	(Brazil)	Tailson	2+11	0	1+3	0	0	0	0+1	0	18	0
10	FW	(Venezuela)	Yeferson Soteldo	20+4	4	9	1	11	2	2	0	46	7
29	FW	(Brazil)	Yuri Alberto	0	0	3	1	1+1	0	0	0	5	1

Last updated: 26 February 2021
Source: Match reports in Competitive matches, Soccerway

=== Goalscorers ===
Ran	No.	Pos	Nat	Name	Brasileirão	Paulistão	Copa Libertadores	Copa do Brasil	Total
1	11	FW	(Brazil)	Marinho	17	3	4	0	24
2	9	FW	(Brazil)	Kaio Jorge	4	0	5	0	9
3	10	MF	(Venezuela)	Soteldo	4	1	2	0	7
4	13	DF	(Brazil)	Madson	5	0	0	0	5
4	36	FW	(Brazil)	Marcos Leonardo	4	0	1	0	5
5	23	FW	(Brazil)	Arthur Gomes	2	2	0	0	4
5	30	FW	(Brazil)	Lucas Braga	2	0	2	0	4
6	19	FW	(Brazil)	Bruno Marques	3	0	0	0	3
6	21	MF	(Brazil)	Diego Pituca	1	1	1	0	3
6	8	MF	(Brazil)	Jobson	2	0	1	0	3
7	27	FW	(Brazil)	Eduardo Sasha	0	2	0	0	2
7	3	DF	(Brazil)	Felipe Jonatan	2	0	0	0	2
7	41	MF	(Brazil)	Jean Mota	1	0	1	0	2
7	28	DF	(Brazil)	Lucas Veríssimo	1	0	1	0	2
7	7	MF	(Uruguay)	Pato Sánchez	0	1	1	0	2
7	12	FW	(Brazil)	Raniel	0	2	0	0	2
8	45	MF	(Brazil)	Ivonei	1	0	0	0	1
8	6	DF	(Brazil)	Laércio	0	0	1	0	1
8	29	FW	(Brazil)	Yuri Alberto	0	1	0	0	1
Own goals					3	1	0	0	4
Total					52	14	17	0	83

Last updated: 22 February 2021
Source: Match reports in Competitive matches

=== Disciplinary record ===
N	Nat	Pos	Name	Brasileirão			Paulista			Libertadores			Copa do Brasil			Total		
N	Nat	Pos	Name	Yellow card	(yellow card) (yellow-red card)	Red card	Yellow card	(yellow card) (yellow-red card)	Red card	Yellow card	(yellow card) (yellow-red card)	Red card	Yellow card	(yellow card) (yellow-red card)	Red card	Yellow card	(yellow card) (yellow-red card)	Red card
11	(Brazil)	FW	Marinho	4	0	0	0	1	0	2	0	0	2	0	1	8	1	1
8	(Brazil)	MF	Jobson	6	0	0	1	1	0	4	0	0	0	0	0	11	1	0
28	(Brazil)	DF	Lucas Veríssimo	6	0	0	1	0	0	4	0	0	0	0	1	11	0	1
5	(Brazil)	MF	Alison	4	1	1	1	0	0	2	0	0	0	0	0	7	1	1
10	(Venezuela)	MF	Yeferson Soteldo	8	0	0	2	0	0	3	0	0	0	0	0	13	0	0
21	(Brazil)	MF	Diego Pituca	4	0	0	1	0	0	3	1	0	1	0	0	9	1	0
38	(Brazil)	MF	Sandry	4	1	0	0	0	0	1	0	0	0	0	1	5	1	1
14	(Brazil)	DF	Luan Peres	3	0	1	1	0	0	4	0	0	0	0	0	8	0	1
3	(Brazil)	DF	Felipe Jonatan	7	0	0	1	0	0	2	0	0	0	0	0	10	0	0
2	(Brazil)	DF	Luiz Felipe	1	0	0	3	0	0	1	0	1	1	0	0	6	0	1
23	(Brazil)	FW	Arthur Gomes	2	0	1	2	0	0	0	0	0	0	0	0	4	0	1
7	(Uruguay)	MF	Pato Sánchez	1	0	0	2	1	0	1	0	0	0	0	0	4	1	0
19	(Brazil)	FW	Kaio Jorge	5	0	0	0	0	0	1	0	0	0	0	0	6	0	0
4	(Brazil)	DF	Pará	3	0	0	2	0	0	1	0	0	0	0	0	6	0	0
13	(Brazil)	DF	Madson	3	0	0	1	0	0	0	0	0	1	0	0	5	0	0
41	(Brazil)	MF	Jean Mota	2	0	0	1	0	0	0	0	0	1	0	0	4	0	0
30	(Brazil)	FW	Lucas Braga	3	0	0	0	0	0	1	0	0	0	0	0	4	0	0
20	(Colombia)	FW	Uribe	0	0	0	0	0	1	0	0	0	0	0	0	0	0	1
34	(Brazil)	GK	João Paulo	3	0	0	0	0	0	0	0	0	0	0	0	3	0	0
42	(Brazil)	DF	Wagner Leonardo	0	0	0	0	0	0	3	0	0	0	0	0	3	0	0
44	(Brazil)	DF	Alex	1	0	0	0	0	0	1	0	0	0	0	0	2	0	0
19	(Brazil)	FW	Bruno Marques	1	0	0	0	0	0	1	0	0	0	0	0	2	0	0
25	(Brazil)	MF	Guilherme Nunes	1	0	0	0	0	0	1	0	0	0	0	0	2	0	0
31	(Brazil)	GK	John Victor	0	0	0	0	0	0	2	0	0	0	0	0	2	0	0
37	(Brazil)	MF	Lucas Lourenço	2	0	0	0	0	0	0	0	0	0	0	0	2	0	0
36	(Brazil)	FW	Marcos Leonardo	2	0	0	0	0	0	0	0	0	0	0	0	2	0	0
40	(Brazil)	MF	Anderson Ceará	0	0	0	1	0	0	0	0	0	0	0	0	1	0	0
25	(Brazil)	MF	Evandro	0	0	0	0	0	0	1	0	0	0	0	0	1	0	0
22	(Brazil)	GK	Everson	0	0	0	1	0	0	0	0	0	0	0	0	1	0	0
45	(Brazil)	MF	Ivonei	1	0	0	0	0	0	0	0	0	0	0	0	1	0	0
6	(Brazil)	DF	Laércio	1	0	0	0	0	0	0	0	0	0	0	0	1	0	0
12	(Brazil)	FW	Raniel	0	0	0	0	0	0	1	0	0	0	0	0	1	0	0
39	(Brazil)	FW	Tailson	0	0	0	0	0	0	0	0	0	1	0	0	1	0	0
17	(Brazil)	MF	Vinicius Balieiro	1	0	0	0	0	0	0	0	0	0	0	0	1	0	0
TOTALS				77	2	3	21	3	1	40	1	1	7	0	3	145	6	8

As of 22 February 2021
Source: Match reports in Competitive matches
(yellow card) = Number of bookings; (yellow card) (yellow-red card) = Number of sending offs after a second yellow card; (red card) = Number of sending offs by a direct red card.

=== Suspensions served ===
Date	Matches Missed	Player	Reason	Opponents Missed	Competition	Source
16 February	1	Luiz Felipe	3x (yellow card)	Ituano (A)	Campeonato Paulista	
14 March	1	Jobson	(red card) vs São Paulo	Santo André (H)	Campeonato Paulista	
22 July	1	Sánchez	(red card) vs Santo André	Novorizontino (A)	Campeonato Paulista	
26 July	1	Uribe	(red card) vs Novorizontino	Ponte Preta (H)	Campeonato Paulista	
23 August	1	Alison	(red card) vs Palmeiras	Flamengo (H)	Campeonato Brasileiro	
5 September	1	Lucas Veríssimo	3x (yellow card)	Atlético Mineiro (H)	Campeonato Brasileiro	
5 September	1	Luan Peres	(red card) vs Ceará	Atlético Mineiro (H)	Campeonato Brasileiro	
5 September	1	Alison	(red card) vs Ceará	Atlético Mineiro (H)	Campeonato Brasileiro	
9 September	1	Felipe Jonatan	3x (yellow card)	São Paulo (H)	Campeonato Brasileiro	
12 September	1	Soteldo	3x (yellow card)	Botafogo (A)	Campeonato Brasileiro	
24 September	1	Lucas Veríssimo	3x (yellow card)	Olimpia (A)	Copa Libertadores	
24 September	1	Luan Peres	3x (yellow card)	Olimpia (A)	Copa Libertadores	
4 October	1	Arthur Gomes	(red card) vs Goiás	Corinthians (A)	Campeonato Brasileiro	
4 October	1	Cuca	3x (yellow card)	Corinthians (A)	Campeonato Brasileiro	
7 October	1	Lucas Braga	3x (yellow card)	Grêmio (H)	Campeonato Brasileiro	
11 October	1	Jobson	3x (yellow card)	Atlético Goianiense (H)	Campeonato Brasileiro	
14 October	1	Pará	3x (yellow card)	Coritiba (A)	Campeonato Brasileiro	
17 October	1	Kaio Jorge	3x (yellow card)	Fluminense (A)	Campeonato Brasileiro	
20 October	1	Jobson	3x (yellow card)	LDU Quito (A)	Copa Libertadores	
28 October	1	Lucas Veríssimo	(red card) vs Ceará	Ceará (A)	Copa do Brasil	
1 November	1	Marinho	3x (yellow card)	Red Bull Bragantino (A)	Campeonato Brasileiro	
8 November	1	Sandry	3x (yellow card)	Internacional (H)	Campeonato Brasileiro	
28 November	1	Jobson	3x (yellow card)	Palmeiras (H)	Campeonato Brasileiro	
1 December	1	Luiz Felipe	(red card) vs LDU Quito	Grêmio (A)	Copa Libertadores	
5 December	1	Soteldo	3x (yellow card)	Flamengo (A)	Campeonato Brasileiro	
5 December	1	Lucas Veríssimo	3x (yellow card)	Flamengo (A)	Campeonato Brasileiro	
5 December	1	Diego Pituca	3x (yellow card)	Flamengo (A)	Campeonato Brasileiro	
9 December	1	Diego Pituca	(red card) vs Grêmio	Grêmio (H)	Copa Libertadores	
27 December	1	Felipe Jonatan	3x (yellow card)	São Paulo (A)	Campeonato Brasileiro	
10 January 2021	1	João Paulo	3x (yellow card)	Botafogo (H)	Campeonato Brasileiro	
10 January 2021	1	Alison	3x (yellow card)	Botafogo (H)	Campeonato Brasileiro	
24 January 2021	1	Luan Peres	3x (yellow card)	Atlético Mineiro (A)	Campeonato Brasileiro	
3 February 2021	1	Madson	3x (yellow card)	Atlético Goianiense (A)	Campeonato Brasileiro	
3 February 2021	1	Sandry	(red card) vs Grêmio	Atlético Goianiense (A)	Campeonato Brasileiro	

== Managers ==
As of 22 February 2021

Name	Nat.	Place of Birth	Date of Birth (Age)	Signed from	Date signed	Role	G	W	D	L	%	Departure	Manner	Contract End
Jesualdo Ferreira	(Portugal)	Mirandela	24 May 1946 (age 80)	Free agent	23 December 2019	Permanent	15	6	4	5	40.00	5 August 2020	Sacked	31 December 2020
Cuca	(Brazil)	Curitiba (Paraná (state))	7 June 1963 (age 63)	Free agent	7 August 2020	Permanent	44	18	14	12	40.91	21 February 2021	Mutual agreement	31 March 2021
Cuquinha	(Brazil)	Curitiba (Paraná (state))	8 June 1969 (age 57)	Staff	7 October 2020	Interim (Note: Interim for the match against Corinthians as Cuca was suspended)	1	0	1	0	0.00	7 October 2020	Return (Note: Back to his assistant role after the match)	—N/a
Cuquinha	(Brazil)	Curitiba (Paraná (state))	8 June 1969 (age 57)	Staff	7 November 2020	Interim (Note: Interim for the match against Red Bull Bragantino as Cuca was diagnosed with COVID-19)	1	0	1	0	0.00	10 November 2020	Return	—N/a
Marcelo Fernandes	(Brazil)	Santos (São Paulo (state))	20 April 1971 (age 55)	Staff	10 November 2020	Interim (Note: Interim for the matches against Internacional, Athletico Paranaense and LDU Quito as Cuca and Cuquinha were diagnosed with COVID-19)	3	2	0	1	66.67	25 November 2020	Return	—N/a
Cuquinha	(Brazil)	Curitiba (Paraná (state))	8 June 1969 (age 57)	Staff	1 December 2020	Interim (Note: Interim for the match against LDU Quito as Cuca failed to test negative for COVID-19, and was unable to manage the club due to the CONMEBOL rules)	1	0	0	1	0.00	1 December 2020	Return	—N/a
Marcelo Fernandes	(Brazil)	Santos (São Paulo (state))	20 April 1971 (age 55)	Staff	22 February 2021	Interim (Note: Interim for the match against Bahia)	0	0	0	0	—			—N/a

== Transfers ==
=== Transfers in ===
N.	Pos.	Name	Age	Moving from	Type	Fee	Source
12	ST	(Brazil) Raniel	23	São Paulo	Swap	Free (Note: Vitor Bueno moved in the opposite direction.)	
13	RB	(Brazil) Madson	27	Grêmio	Swap	Free (Note: Victor Ferraz moved in the opposite direction.)	
30	SS	(Brazil) Lucas Braga	23	Inter de Limeira	Loan return	Free	
16	LW/SS	(Colombia) Copete	32	Everton (Chile)	Loan return	Free	
6	CB	(Brazil) Laércio	27	Caxias	Transfer	Free	
25	DM	(Brazil) Guilherme Nunes	22	Portuguesa	Loan return	Free	

=== Loans in ===
N.	Pos.	Name	Age	Loaned from	Loan expires	Fee	Source

=== Transfers out ===
N.	Pos.	Name	Age	Moving to	Type	Fee	Source
—	AM	(Brazil) Vitor Bueno	25	São Paulo	Swap	Free (Note: Raniel moved in the opposite direction.)	
4	RB	(Brazil) Victor Ferraz	31	Grêmio	Swap	Free (Note: Madson moved in the opposite direction.)	
3	LB	(Brazil) Jorge	23	Monaco (France)	Loan return	Free	
6	CB	(Brazil) Gustavo Henrique	26	Flamengo	End of contract	Free	
—	DM	(Brazil) Yuri	25	Fluminense	Transfer	Free	
1	GK	(Brazil) Vanderlei	35	Grêmio	Transfer	R$ 3M	
17	SS	(Paraguay) Derlis González	25	Dynamo Kyiv (Ukraine)	Loan return	Free	
26	CB	(Colombia) Felipe Aguilar	27	Athletico Paranaense	Transfer	R$ 10M	
25	AM	(Brazil) Evandro	33	Free agent	End of contract	Free	
–	AM	(Costa Rica) Bryan Ruiz	34	Alajuelense (Costa Rica)	Contract terminated	Free	
29	ST	(Brazil) Yuri Alberto	19	Internacional	End of contract	Free	
27	SS/ST	(Brazil) Eduardo Sasha	28	Atlético Mineiro	Transfer	R$ 9.8M	
22	GK	(Brazil) Everson	30	Atlético Mineiro	Transfer	R$ 6M	
20	ST	(Colombia) Fernando Uribe	32	Free agent	Contract terminated	Free	
–	RB	(Brazil) Matheus Ribeiro	27	Chapecoense	Contract terminated	Free	
–	CB	(Argentina) Fabián Noguera	27	Free agent	Contract terminated	Free	
28	CB	(Brazil) Lucas Veríssimo	25	Benfica	Transfer	€6.5M	
21	DM	(Brazil) Diego Pituca	28	Kashima Antlers	Transfer	Undisclosed	

=== Loans out ===
N.	P	Name	Age	Loaned to	Loan expires	Source
–	ST	(Brazil) Rodrigão	26	Ceará	December 2020	
–	LB	(Brazil) Romário	27	Mirassol	April 2020	
–	CB	(Brazil) Cléber Reis	29	Ponte Preta	December 2020	
–	CB	(Brazil) Sabino	23	Coritiba	December 2020	
–	ST	(Brazil) Felippe Cardoso	21	Fluminense	December 2020	
35	AM	(Brazil) Rafael Longuine	29	CRB	December 2020	
–	RB	(Brazil) Matheus Ribeiro	26	Chapecoense	December 2020	
18	DM	(Brazil) Guilherme Nunes	21	Portuguesa	September 2020	
–	LB	(Brazil) Romário	28	Cuiabá	December 2020	
37	SS	(Brazil) Lucas Venuto	25	Sport	February 2021	
–	RB	(Brazil) Daniel Guedes	26	Cruzeiro	December 2021	
40	AM	(Brazil) Anderson Ceará	21	CRB	February 2021	

== Competitions ==
=== Overview ===
Competition	First match	Last match	Starting round	Final position	Record							
Competition	First match	Last match	Starting round	Final position	Pld	W	D	L	GF	GA	GD	Win %
Série A	9 August 2020	25 February 2021	Matchday 1	8th	38	14	12	12	52	51	+1	36.84
Copa do Brasil	28 October 2020	4 November 2020	Round of 16	Round of 16	2	0	1	1	0	1	−1	0.00
Campeonato Paulista	23 January 2020	30 July 2020	Matchday 1	Quarterfinals	13	4	4	5	14	15	−1	30.77
Copa Libertadores	3 March 2020	30 January 2021	Group stage	Runners-up	13	8	3	2	20	10	+10	61.54
Total					66	26	20	20	86	77	+9	39.39

Source: Competitions

=== Campeonato Brasileiro ===
==== Results summary ====
Overall								Home						Away					
Pld	W	D	L	GF	GA	GD	Pts	W	D	L	GF	GA	GD	W	D	L	GF	GA	GD
38	14	12	12	52	51	+1	54	9	7	3	35	23	+12	5	5	9	17	28	−11

Last updated: 26 February 2021.
Source: Soccerway

==== Results by round ====
Round	1	2	3	4	5	6	7	8	9	10	11	12	13	14	15	16	17	18	19	20	21	22	23	24	25	26	27	29	30	31	32	28	34	35	36	33	37	38
Ground	H	A	H	A	A	H	H	A	H	H	A	H	A	A	H	H	A	A	H	A	H	A	H	H	A	A	H	A	H	A	H	A	A	A	H	H	H	A
Result	D	L	W	W	L	L	D	W	W	D	D	D	W	D	W	L	W	L	W	D	W	L	W	D	L	L	D	W	W	L	L	L	D	D	W	W	D	L
Position	6	15	8	5	6	10	11	7	7	7	7	9	6	7	6	6	5	6	6	7	6	7	6	8	8	8	8	9	8	9	9	10	10	11	9	8	8	8

Updated to match(es) played on 25 February 2021. Source: Globo Esporte
W = Win; D = Draw; L = Loss

==== League table ====
Pos	Team	Pld	W	D	L	GF	GA	GD	Pts	Qualification or relegation
6	Grêmio	38	14	17	7	53	40	+13	59	Qualification for Copa Libertadores second stage
7	Palmeiras	38	15	13	10	51	37	+14	58	Qualification for Copa Libertadores group stage (Note: Palmeiras qualified for the Copa Libertadores group stage by winning the 2020 Copa Libertadores and the 2020 Copa do Brasil.)
8	Santos	38	14	12	12	52	51	+1	54	Qualification for Copa Libertadores second stage
9	Athletico Paranaense	38	15	8	15	38	36	+2	53	Qualification for Copa Sudamericana group stage
10	Red Bull Bragantino	38	13	14	11	50	40	+10	53	Qualification for Copa Sudamericana group stage

Source: CBF
Rules for classification: 1) points; 2) wins; 3) goal difference; 4) goals scored; 5) head-to-head results (only between 2 teams); 6) fewest red cards; 7) fewest yellow cards; 8) draw.

==== Matches ====
9 August 1	Santos	1–1	Red Bull Bragantino	Santos
16:00 UTC-03:00	Marinho 65'	Report	(yellow card) 64' Ricardo Ryller; 90+3' Claudinho	Stadium: Vila Belmiro; Attendance: 0 Referee: Ricardo Marques Ribeiro

13 August 2	Internacional	2–0	Santos	Porto Alegre
19:30 UTC-03:00	Edenílson (yellow card) 56' (goal) 88'; Guerrero 57'; Moisés (yellow card) 78'	Report	(yellow card) 74' Lucas Veríssimo; (yellow card) 79' Kaio Jorge; (yellow card) 82' Marinho	Stadium: Beira-Rio; Attendance: 0 Referee: Marcelo de Lima Henrique

16 August 3	Santos	3–1	Athletico Paranaense	Santos
19:45 UTC-03:00	Soteldo 29'; Felipe Jonatan 41'; Alison (yellow card) 55'; Marinho 82'	Report	(yellow card) 74' Richard; 88' Abner	Stadium: Vila Belmiro; Attendance: 0 Referee: Anderson Daronco

20 August 4	Sport	0–1	Santos	Recife
19:15 UTC-03:00	Adryelson (yellow card) 23'; Ronaldo Silva (yellow card) 28'; Bruninho (yellow card) 30'; Iago Maidana (yellow card) 36'; Willian Farias (yellow card) 90+6'	Report	(yellow card) 36' Soteldo; (yellow card) 73' Lucas Braga; 76' Marinho	Stadium: Ilha do Retiro; Attendance: 0 Referee: José Mendonça

23 August 5	Palmeiras	2–1	Santos	São Paulo
16:00 UTC-03:00	Luiz Adriano (yellow card) 16' (goal) 45+1' (pen.); Bruno Henrique (yellow card) 36'; Rony (yellow card) 45+3'; Ramires (yellow card) 63'; Patrick de Paula 73'; Gabriel Silva (yellow card) 90+6'	Report	(yellow card) 29' Felipe Jonatan; (yellow card) 39' Diego Pituca; (yellow card) 44' (yellow-red card) 90+2' Alison; 48' (o.g.) Ramires	Stadium: Morumbi; Attendance: 0 Referee: Vinicius Gonçalves Dias Araujo

30 August 6	Santos	0–1	Flamengo	Santos
16:00 UTC-03:00	Pará (yellow card) 39'; Jobson (yellow card) 45'; Cuca (yellow card) 45+7'; Lucas Veríssimo (yellow card) 86'; Ivonei (yellow card) 90'; Madson (yellow card) 90+1'; Soteldo (yellow card) 90+3'	Report	(yellow card) 32' Renê; (yellow card) 39' Gerson; 45+5' (yellow card) 45+7' Gabriel; (yellow card) 46' Michael; (yellow card) 57' Bruno Henrique; (yellow card) 79' Willian Arão; (yellow card) 88' Isla	Stadium: Vila Belmiro; Attendance: 0 Referee: Wilton Pereira Sampaio

2 September 7	Santos	2–2	Vasco da Gama	Santos
21:30 UTC-03:00	Lucas Veríssimo 21'; Jobson (yellow card) 26'; Marinho 58'; Cuca (yellow card) 85'	Report	41' Fellipe Bastos; (yellow card) 57' Miranda; 72' (pen.) Cano; (yellow card) 90+1' Henrique; (yellow card) 90+4' Guilherme Parede	Stadium: Vila Belmiro; Attendance: 0 Referee: Rodrigo D'Alonso Ferreira

5 September 8	Ceará	0–1	Santos	Fortaleza
21:00 UTC-03:00	Luiz Otávio (yellow card) 45'; Bruno Pacheco (yellow card) 50' (yellow-red card) 90+1'; Leandro Carvalho (yellow card) 51'; Samuel Xavier (red card) 82'	Report	9' (yellow card) 43' Felipe Jonatan; (yellow card) 33' Lucas Veríssimo; (yellow card) 62' Kaio Jorge; (yellow card) 68' Lucas Braga; (red card) 82' Luan Peres; (red card) 90+3' Alison	Stadium: Castelão; Attendance: 0 Referee: Wagner Reway

9 September 9	Santos	3–1	Atlético Mineiro	Santos
21:30 UTC-03:00	Arthur Gomes 22'; Marinho 39', 90+9' (pen.); Felipe Jonatan (yellow card) 51'	Report	(red card) 16' Rafael; (yellow card) 24' Jair; 35' Franco; (yellow card) 46' Keno	Stadium: Vila Belmiro; Attendance: 0 Referee: Wagner do Nascimento Magalhães

12 September 10	Santos	2–2	São Paulo	Santos
19:00 UTC-03:00	Soteldo (yellow card) 26'; Madson 30'; Alison (yellow card) 48'; Luan Peres (yellow card) 65'; Marinho 90+1'	Report	8', 38' Gabriel Sara; (yellow card) 71' Igor Vinícius; (yellow card) 90+6' Hernanes	Stadium: Vila Belmiro; Attendance: 0 Referee: Luiz Flávio de Oliveira

20 September 11	Botafogo	0–0	Santos	Rio de Janeiro
18:15 UTC-03:00	Fernando (yellow card) 10'; Gatito Fernández (yellow card) 40'; Caio Alexandre (yellow card) 43'; Davi Araújo (yellow card) 65'	Report	(yellow card) 11' Sánchez; (yellow card) 90+2' Lucas Veríssimo	Stadium: Engenhão; Attendance: 0 Referee: José Mendonça

27 September 12	Santos	1–1	Fortaleza	Santos
20:30 UTC-03:00	Madson 41'; Felipe Jonatan (yellow card) 70'	Report	47' Gabriel Dias; (yellow card) 54' Romarinho	Stadium: Vila Belmiro; Attendance: 0 Referee: Heber Roberto Lopes

4 October 13	Goiás	2–3	Santos	Goiânia
18:15 UTC-03:00	Vinícius Lopes 4'; David Duarte (yellow card) 17' (yellow-red card) 58'; Sandro (yellow card) 24'; Victor Andrade (yellow card) 43' (goal) 84'; Daniel Bessa (yellow card) 45+8'	Report	18' (pen.) Marinho; (red card) 33' Arthur Gomes; (yellow card) 34' Cuca; 54' (o.g.) Jefferson; (yellow card) 63' Pará; 76' (yellow card) 76' Marcos Leonardo; (yellow card) 89' João Paulo	Stadium: Serrinha; Attendance: 0 Referee: Marielson Alves Silva

7 October 14	Corinthians	1–1	Santos	São Paulo
19:00 UTC-03:00	Danilo Avelar 45' (yellow card) 81'; Roni (yellow card) 59'	Report	11' Madson; (yellow card) 27' Lucas Braga; (yellow card) 78' Lucas Lourenço	Stadium: Arena Corinthians; Attendance: 0 Referee: Marcelo de Lima Henrique

11 October 15	Santos	2–1	Grêmio	Santos
16:00 UTC-03:00	Marinho 20' (pen.), 79' (pen.) (yellow card) 90+5'; Jobson (yellow card) 21'	Report	(yellow card) 12' Robinho; 73' Diego Souza; (yellow card) 78' (yellow-red card) 90+8' David Braz; (yellow card) 90+1' Rodrigues	Stadium: Vila Belmiro; Attendance: 0 Referee: Braulio da Silva Machado

14 October 16	Santos	0–1	Atlético Goianiense	Santos
20:30 UTC-03:00	Pará (yellow card) 71'; Cuca (yellow card) 77'; Sandry (yellow card) 80'; Diego Pituca (yellow card) 88'	Report	67' Chico; (yellow card) 78' Marlon Freitas; (yellow card) 88' João Victor; (yellow card) 90+1' Gustavo Ferrareis	Stadium: Vila Belmiro; Attendance: 0 Referee: Igor Junior Benevenuto

17 October 17	Coritiba	1–2	Santos	Curitiba
17:00 UTC-03:00	Hugo Moura (yellow card) 26'; Giovanni Augusto 74'; Nathan Silva (yellow card) 77'; Matheus Sales (yellow card) 82'; William Matheus (yellow card) 89'; Ricardo Oliveira (yellow card) 90+5'	Report	6' (yellow card) 59' Kaio Jorge; 27' (pen.) Soteldo; (yellow card) 30' Jobson	Stadium: Couto Pereira; Attendance: 0 Referee: Bruno Arleu de Araújo

25 October 18	Fluminense	3–1	Santos	Rio de Janeiro
16:00 UTC-03:00	Araújo (yellow card) 24'; Luccas Claro 29'; Dodi (yellow card) 40'; Wellington Silva (yellow card) 40'; Nino 56'; Hudson (yellow card) 61'; Fred (yellow card) 90'; Marcos Paulo 90+3'	Report	36' Marinho; (yellow card) 53' Felipe Jonatan; (yellow card) 71' Arthur Gomes; (yellow card) 78' Luan Peres; (yellow card) 90+6' Soteldo	Stadium: Maracanã; Attendance: 0 Referee: Anderson Daronco

1 November 19	Santos	3–1	Bahia	Santos
18:15 UTC-03:00	Madson 10' (yellow card) 38'; Marinho 26' (yellow card) 79'; Jobson 37'; João Paulo (yellow card) 65'; Sandry (yellow card) 90+4'	Report	28' Danielzinho; (yellow card) 42' Juninho; (yellow card) 80' Anderson Martins	Stadium: Vila Belmiro; Attendance: 0 Referee: Heber Roberto Lopes

8 November 20	Red Bull Bragantino	1–1	Santos	Bragança Paulista
18:15 UTC-03:00	Lucas Evangelista (yellow card) 10'; Léo Ortiz 90+6'	Report	(yellow card) 42' Jean Mota; (yellow card) 57' Jobson; 64' (o.g.) Léo Ortiz; (yellow card) 80' Sandry; (yellow card) 83' Soteldo	Stadium: Nabi Abi Chedid; Attendance: 0 Referee: Vinicius Furlan

14 November 21	Santos	2–0	Internacional	Santos
16:30 UTC-03:00	Kaio Jorge (yellow card) 44' (goal) 68'; Ivonei 59'	Report	(yellow card) 35' Rodrigo Lindoso; (yellow card) 58' Rodinei	Stadium: Vila Belmiro; Attendance: 0 Referee: Savio Pereira

21 November 22	Athletico Paranaense	1–0	Santos	Curitiba
19:00 UTC-03:00	Thiago Heleno 76'	Report	(yellow card) 81' Sandry; (yellow card) 90+1' Marinho	Stadium: Arena da Baixada; Attendance: 0 Referee: Marcelo De Lima

28 November 23	Santos	4–2	Sport	Santos
17:00 UTC-03:00	Marinho 7' (pen.); Lucas Braga 11'; Lucas Lourenço (yellow card) 19'; Jobson (yellow card) 26'; Lucas Veríssimo (yellow card) 43'; Bruno Marques 71'; Soteldo 82' (pen.)	Report	(yellow card) 14' Adryelson; (yellow card) 21' (goal) 28' Marquinhos; (yellow card) 41' Mugni; 45' Barcia	Stadium: Vila Belmiro; Attendance: 0 Referee: Wilton Pereira Sampaio

5 December 24	Santos	2–2	Palmeiras	Santos
17:00 UTC-03:00	Soteldo (yellow card) 22'; Diego Pituca 38' (yellow card) 86'; Lucas Veríssimo (yellow card) 54'; Marinho 71'	Report	55' (pen.) Raphael Veiga; (yellow card) 59' Lucas Lima; 63' Willian; (yellow card) 67' Emerson; (yellow card) 73' Mayke; (red card) 90+4' Zé Rafael	Stadium: Vila Belmiro; Attendance: 0 Referee: Flavio Rodrigues de Souza

13 December 25	Flamengo	4–1	Santos	Rio de Janeiro
16:00 UTC-03:00	Gerson 42'; Gabriel Barbosa 50' (pen.), 71' (pen.); Filipe Luís 58' (yellow card) 81'; João Gomes (yellow card) 74'	Report	(yellow card) 45+3' Marcos Leonardo; 75' Bruno Marques	Stadium: Maracanã; Attendance: 0 Referee: Paulo Roberto Alves Júnior

20 December 26	Vasco da Gama	1–0	Santos	Rio de Janeiro
16:00 UTC-03:00	Carlinhos 9'; Jadson (yellow card) 44'; Henrique (yellow card) 90+8'	Report		Stadium: São Januário; Attendance: 0 Referee: Ricardo Marques Ribeiro

27 December 27	Santos	1–1	Ceará	Santos
19:15 UTC-03:00	Marinho 11'; Diego Pituca (yellow card) 72'; Felipe Jonatan (yellow card) 86'	Report	37' Samuel Xavier; (yellow card) 45+2' Cléber; (yellow card) 90+6' Saulo Mineiro; (yellow card) 90+10' Vinícius Goes	Stadium: Vila Belmiro; Attendance: 0 Referee: Rodolpho Toski Marques

10 January 2021 29	São Paulo	0–1	Santos	São Paulo
16:00 UTC-03:00	Pablo (yellow card) 37'; Hernanes (yellow card) 82'	Report	(yellow card) 25' Alex; (yellow card) 43' Vinicius Balieiro; 46' Jobson; (yellow card) 67' João Paulo; (yellow card) 77' Alison	Stadium: Morumbi; Attendance: 0 Referee: Braulio da Silva Machado

17 January 2021 30	Santos	2–1	Botafogo	Santos
16:00 UTC-03:00	Soteldo 4' (yellow card) 33'; Laércio (yellow card) 30'; Bruno Marques 82'	Report	(yellow card) 30' Kevin; 45+2' (pen.) Pedro Raúl	Stadium: Vila Belmiro; Attendance: 0 Referee: Leandro Pedro Vuaden

21 January 2021 31	Fortaleza	2–0	Santos	Fortaleza
19:00 UTC-03:00	Juninho 48' (pen.); Felipe (yellow card) 53'; Carlinhos (yellow card) 64'; Wellington Paulista 66'; Romarinho (yellow card) 83'	Report		Stadium: Castelão; Attendance: 0 Referee: Ricardo Marques Ribeiro

24 January 2021 32	Santos	3–4	Goiás	Santos
18:15 UTC-03:00	Lucas Braga 7'; Luan Peres (yellow card) 18'; Kaio Jorge 38' (yellow card) 48'; Marinho 87' (pen.); Guilherme Nunes (yellow card) 90+5'; Soteldo (yellow card) 90+7'	Report	(yellow card) 13' Breno; (yellow card) 33' (goal) 54', 77' Rafael Moura; (yellow card) 49' Iago; 60' David Duarte; 76' (pen.) Fernandão; (yellow card) 90+7' Taylon	Stadium: Vila Belmiro; Attendance: 0 Referee: Wagner do Nascimento Magalhães

26 January 2021 28	Atlético Mineiro	2–0	Santos	Belo Horizonte
20:00 UTC-03:00	Savarino 3', 19'; Jair (yellow card) 90+7'	Report	(yellow card) 41' Arthur Gomes	Stadium: Mineirão; Attendance: 0 Referee: Paulo Roberto Alves Junior

3 February 2021 34	Grêmio	3–3	Santos	Porto Alegre
16:00 UTC-03:00	Diego Souza 37' (yellow card) 68'; Jean Pyerre 46'; Pepê 53'; Kannemann (yellow card) 66'; Matheus Henrique (yellow card) 85'; Victor Ferraz (yellow card) 90+1'; Luiz Fernando (yellow card) 90+4'	Report	8' Kaio Jorge; (yellow card) 13' (yellow-red card) 86' Sandry; 67' (pen.) Arthur Gomes; (yellow card) 70' (goal) 90+6' (pen.) Madson	Stadium: Arena do Grêmio; Attendance: 0 Referee: Wilton Pereira Sampaio

6 February 2021 35	Atlético Goianiense	1–1	Santos	Goiânia
21:00 UTC-03:00	Jean 33' (pen.); Matheus Vargas (red card) 63'; Éder (yellow card) 78'; João Victor (yellow card) 90+4'	Report	(yellow card) 45+2' Alison; 79' (pen.) Marcos Leonardo; (yellow card) 90+4' Felipe Jonatan	Stadium: Antônio Accioly; Attendance: 0 Referee: Marcelo De Lima Henrique

13 February 2021 36	Santos	2–0	Coritiba	Santos
19:00 UTC-03:00	Marinho 37'; Marcos Leonardo 83'	Report	(yellow card) 27' Guilherme Biro; (yellow card) 82' Robson Fernandes; (yellow card) 88' Nathan Ribeiro; (yellow card) 90+5' Hugo Moura	Stadium: Vila Belmiro; Attendance: 0 Referee: Bruno Arleu de Araujo

17 February 2021 33	Santos	1–0	Corinthians	Santos
19:00 UTC-03:00	Marcos Leonardo 55'	Report		Stadium: Vila Belmiro; Attendance: 0 Referee: Vinicius Gonçalves Dias Araújo

21 February 2021 37	Santos	1–1	Fluminense	Santos
18:15 UTC-03:00	Luiz Felipe (yellow card) 20'; Bruno Marques (yellow card) 76'; Jean Mota 87' (yellow card) 87'	Report	16' Lucca; (yellow card) 40' Egídio; (yellow card) 42' Yago Felipe; (yellow card) 54' Fred; (yellow card) 85' (red card) 85' Nino	Stadium: Vila Belmiro; Attendance: 0 Referee: Savio Pereira

25 February 2021 38	Bahia	2–0	Santos	Salvador
21:30 UTC-03:00	Rossi 15'; Alesson 90+1'	Report		Stadium: Arena Fonte Nova; Attendance: 0 Referee: Paulo Roberto Alves Júnior

=== Copa do Brasil ===
==== Round of 16 ====
28 October 1st leg	Santos	0–0	Ceará	Santos
16:00 UTC-03:00	Jean Mota (yellow card) 35'; Marinho (yellow card) 40'; Lucas Veríssimo (red card) 45+1'; Tailson (yellow card) 72'; Luiz Felipe (yellow card) 76'; Madson (yellow card) 90+4'	Report	(yellow card) 14' Charles; (yellow card) 56' Leonardo Chú; (yellow card) 83' Fabinho; (yellow card) 90' Rick	Stadium: Vila Belmiro; Attendance: 0 Referee: Wagner do Nascimento Magalhães

4 November 2nd leg	Ceará	1–0 (1–0 agg.)	Santos	Fortaleza
19:00 UTC-03:00	Vinícius Goes 70' (yellow card) 78'; Leandro Carvalho (yellow card) 90+2'; Pedrinho (yellow card) 90+4'	Report	(yellow card) 60' Diego Pituca; (yellow card) 90+1' (red card) 90+7' Marinho; (red card) 90+5' Sandry	Stadium: Castelão; Attendance: 0 Referee: Leandro Vuaden

=== Campeonato Paulista ===
==== Results summary ====
Overall								Home						Away					
Pld	W	D	L	GF	GA	GD	Pts	W	D	L	GF	GA	GD	W	D	L	GF	GA	GD
13	4	4	5	14	15	−1	16	3	3	1	9	5	+4	1	1	4	5	10	−5

Last updated: 6 August 2020.
Source: Globo Esporte

==== Group stage ====
Pos	Team	Pld	W	D	L	GF	GA	GD	Pts	Qualification or relegation
1	Santos	12	4	4	4	13	12	+1	16	Knockout stage
2	Ponte Preta	12	4	1	7	14	16	−2	13	Knockout stage
3	Água Santa (R)	12	2	5	5	7	15	−8	11	Relegation to Série A2
4	Oeste (R)	12	3	1	8	8	24	−16	10	Relegation to Série A2

Source: Soccerway
(R) Relegated

==== Matches ====
23 January 1	Santos	0–0	Red Bull Bragantino	Santos
19:15 UTC-03:00	Sánchez (yellow card) 20'	Report	(yellow card) 33' Ligger; (yellow card) 72' Edimar Fraga; (yellow card) 77' Barreto; (yellow card) 90+3' Artur	Stadium: Vila Belmiro; Attendance: 12,412; Referee: Raphael Claus

27 January 2	Guarani	1–2	Santos	Campinas
20:00 UTC-03:00	Lucas Santos (red card) 46'; Rafael Costa 65'; Romércio (yellow card) 84'	Report	(yellow card) 12' Pará; 22' Arthur Gomes; (yellow card) 49' Luiz Felipe; 90+3' (o.g.) Pablo Diogo	Stadium: Brinco de Ouro; Attendance: 9,130; Referee: Vinicius Furlan

30 January 3	Santos	2–0	Internacional	Santos
19:15 UTC-03:00	Raniel 23', 45'	Report	(yellow card) 70' Matheus Neris; (yellow card) 72' Geovane	Stadium: Vila Belmiro; Attendance: 5,419; Referee: Vinicius Gonçalves Dias Araujo

2 February 4	Corinthians	2–0	Santos	São Paulo
11:00 UTC-03:00	Everaldo 2'; Janderson (yellow card) 16' (yellow-red card) 48' (goal) 47'; Cássio (yellow card) 76'	Report	(yellow card) 17' Jobson	Stadium: Arena Corinthians; Attendance: 40,669; Referee: Luiz Flavio de Oliveira

10 February 5	Santos	2–0	Botafogo–SP	Santos
20:00 UTC-03:00	Luan Peres (yellow card) 9'; Sánchez 21'; Luiz Felipe (yellow card) 53'; Eduardo Sasha 56'	Report	(yellow card) 73' Didi	Stadium: Vila Belmiro; Attendance: 3,504; Referee: Flavio Rodrigues de Souza

16 February 6	Ferroviária	0–0	Santos	Araraquara
19:00 UTC-03:00	Lucas Mendes (yellow card) 33'; Max (yellow card) 39' (yellow-red card) 90'; Mazinho (yellow card) 90+4'	Report	(yellow card) 36' Luiz Felipe	Stadium: Fonte Luminosa; Attendance: 6,904; Referee: Leandro Carvalho da Silva

22 February 7	Ituano	2–0	Santos	Itu
16:30 UTC-03:00	Gabriel Taliari (yellow card) 9'; Yago César 12'; Corrêa 27'; Luizinho (yellow card) 40'; Suéliton (yellow card) 90'	Report	(yellow card) 53' Soteldo; (yellow card) 85' Jean Mota	Stadium: Novelli Júnior; Attendance: 3,959; Referee: Edina Alves Batista

29 February 8	Santos	0–0	Palmeiras	São Paulo
16:00 UTC-03:00	Felipe Jonatan (yellow card) 24'; Sánchez (yellow card) 60'; Lucas Veríssimo (yellow card) 68'	Report	(yellow card) 31' Felipe Melo	Stadium: Pacaembu; Attendance: 20,371; Referee: Flavio Rodrigues de Souza

7 March 9	Santos	3–1	Mirassol	Santos
19:30 UTC-03:00	Diego Pituca 4' (yellow card) 45+3'; Yuri Alberto 19'; Eduardo Sasha 23'; Madson (yellow card) 31'; Soteldo (yellow card) 45+3'; Everson (yellow card) 62'	Report	32' Rafael Silva; (yellow card) 45' Matheus Rocha	Stadium: Vila Belmiro; Attendance: 6,762; Referee: Ilbert Estevam da Silva

14 March 10	São Paulo	2–1	Santos	São Paulo
19:00 UTC-03:00	Tchê Tchê (yellow card) 14'; Pablo 53', 67' (yellow card) 75'; Arboleda (yellow card) 69'	Report	(yellow card) 16' (yellow-red card) 45' Jobson; 30' (yellow card) 85' Arthur Gomes	Stadium: Morumbi; Attendance: 0 Referee: Luiz Flavio de Oliveira

22 July 11	Santos	1–1	Santo André	Santos
19:15 UTC-03:00	Sánchez (yellow card) 26' (yellow-red card) 42'; Soteldo 45+3'; Alison (yellow card) 88'	Report	19' Rodrigo; (yellow card) 28' Marlon; (yellow card) 90' Douglas Baggio	Stadium: Vila Belmiro; Attendance: 0 Referee: Thiago Luis Scarascati

26 July 12	Novorizontino	3–2	Santos	São Paulo
16:00 UTC-03:00	Adilson Goiano (yellow card) 55'; Guilherme Queiróz (yellow card) 58' (goal) 63' (pen.); Cleo Silva 59'; Vladimir 81' (o.g.)	Report	17', 48' Marinho; (red card) 52' Uribe; (yellow card) 90+2' Anderson Ceará	Stadium: Arena Corinthians; Attendance: 0 Referee: Vinicius Furlan

==== Knockout stage ====
===== Quarter-final =====
30 July	Santos	1–3	Ponte Preta	Santos
21:30 UTC-03:00	Marinho 6' (yellow card) 21' (yellow-red card) 42'; Arthur Gomes (yellow card) 86'; Pará (yellow card) 90+3'	Report	(yellow card) 29' Jeferson; 50' Bruno Rodrigues; 61' Moisés; 88' João Paulo	Stadium: Vila Belmiro; Attendance: 0 Referee: Salim Fende Chavez

=== Copa Libertadores ===
==== Group stage ====
Pos	Team	Pld	W	D	L	GF	GA	GD	Pts	Qualification
1	(Brazil) Santos	6	5	1	0	10	5	+5	16	Round of 16
2	(Ecuador) Delfín	6	2	1	3	6	7	−1	7	Round of 16
3	(Argentina) Defensa y Justicia	6	2	0	4	8	10	−2	6	Copa Sudamericana
4	(Paraguay) Olimpia	6	1	2	3	6	8	−2	5	

Source: CONMEBOL

3 March 1	Defensa y Justicia (Argentina)	1–2	(Brazil) Santos	Florencio Varela, Argentina
19:15 UTC−03:00	Rodríguez 45+1'; Botta (yellow card) 78'; Benítez (yellow card) 90+3'	Report	(yellow card) 22' Lucas Veríssimo; (yellow card) 37' Luan Peres; (yellow card) 51' Evandro; (yellow card) 55' Sánchez; 72' Jobson; 86' (yellow card) 87' Kaio Jorge	Stadium: Norberto "Tito" Tomaghello; Referee: (Uruguay) Gustavo Tejera

10 March 2	Santos (Brazil)	1–0	(Ecuador) Delfín	Santos
19:15 UTC−03:00	Luan Peres (yellow card) 20'; Lucas Veríssimo 30' (yellow card) 90'; Jobson (yellow card) 51'; Felipe Jonatan (yellow card) 90+4'	Report	(yellow card) 43' Cangá; (yellow card) 50' Calderón; (yellow card) 90+2' Alaniz	Stadium: Vila Belmiro; Attendance: 0 Referee: (Peru) Kevin Ortega

15 September 3	Santos (Brazil)	0–0	(Paraguay) Olimpia	Santos
21:30 UTC−03:00	Marinho (yellow card) 90+1'	Report	(yellow card) 28' Candia; (yellow card) 51' (yellow-red card) 68' Rojas; (yellow card) 84' De la Cruz	Stadium: Vila Belmiro; Attendance: 0 Referee: (Uruguay) Leodan González

24 September 4	Delfín (Ecuador)	1–2	(Brazil) Santos	Manta, Ecuador
21:00 UTC−05:00	Valencia (yellow card) 25'; Cangá (yellow card) 28'; Rodríguez (yellow card) 39' (yellow-red card) 41'; Rojas 74'; Nazareno (yellow card) 87'	Report	18' (yellow card) 80' Marinho; (yellow card) 25' Lucas Veríssimo; (yellow card) 65' Pará; 82' Jean Mota; (yellow card) 85' Luan Peres	Stadium: Jocay; Attendance: 0 Referee: (Peru) Kevin Ortega

1 October 5	Olimpia (Paraguay)	2–3	(Brazil) Santos	Asunción, Paraguay
18:00 UTC−04:00	Recalde 22', 33' (yellow card) 39'; Azcona (yellow card) 90+4'; Leguizamón (yellow card) 90+8'	Report	(yellow card) 3' Alex; 14' (pen.) Sánchez; 40' Marinho; (yellow card) 49' Jobson; 58' Kaio Jorge; (yellow card) 90+3' Raniel	Stadium: Manuel Ferreira; Attendance: 0 Referee: (Argentina) Néstor Pitana

20 October 6	Santos (Brazil)	2–1	(Argentina) Defensa y Justicia	Santos
19:15 UTC−03:00	Jobson (yellow card) 45+1'; Lucas Braga (yellow card) 76' (goal) 78'; Diego Pituca (yellow card) 86'; Marcos Leonardo 90+1'; Wagner Leonardo (yellow card) 90+3'	Report	(yellow card) 21' (goal) 51' Romero; (yellow card) 68' Martínez	Stadium: Vila Belmiro; Attendance: 0 Referee: (Uruguay) Leodan González

==== Knockout stage ====
===== Round of 16 =====
24 November 1st Leg	LDU Quito (Ecuador)	1–2	(Brazil) Santos	Quito, Ecuador
17:15 UTC−05:00	Vega (yellow card) 32'; Julio 45+2'; Alcívar (yellow card) 62'; Aguirre (yellow card) 81'; Ordóñez (yellow card) 90+8'	Report	7' (yellow card) 84' Soteldo; (yellow card) 40' Luiz Felipe; (yellow card) 48' Wagner Leonardo; 59' (pen.) Marinho; (yellow card) 80' Felipe Jonatan	Stadium: Casa Blanca; Attendance: 0 Referee: (Argentina) Fernando Rapallini

1 December 2nd Leg	Santos (Brazil)	0–1 (2a–2 agg.)	(Ecuador) LDU Quito	Santos
19:15 UTC−03:00	Alison (yellow card) 45'; Soteldo (yellow card) 59'; Wagner Leonardo (yellow card) 90+1'; Luiz Felipe (red card) 90+22'; John (yellow card) 90+22'	Report	(yellow card) 46' Ayala; 66' Zunino; (yellow card) 89' Caicedo; (red card) 90+12' Aguirre; (red card) 90+22' Villarruel	Stadium: Vila Belmiro; Attendance: 0 Referee: (Argentina) Néstor Pitana

===== Quarterfinal =====
9 December 1st Leg	Grêmio (Brazil)	1–1	(Brazil) Santos	Porto Alegre
19:15 UTC−03:00	Matheus Henrique (yellow card) 6'; Maicon (yellow card) 9'; Diogo Barbosa (yellow card) 45+4'; Diego Souza 90+12' (pen.)	Report	(yellow card) 30' Luan Peres; 36' Kaio Jorge; (yellow card) 38' Jobson; (yellow card) 42' (yellow-red card) 90+1' Diego Pituca; (yellow card) 83' Sandry	Stadium: Arena do Grêmio; Attendance: 0 Referee: (Paraguay) Juan Gabriel Benítez

16 December 2nd Leg	Santos (Brazil)	4–1 (5–2 agg.)	(Brazil) Grêmio	Santos
19:15 UTC−03:00	Kaio Jorge 1', 54'; John (yellow card) 12'; Marinho 16'; Guilherme Nunes (yellow card) 72'; Laércio 83'; Bruno Marques (yellow card) 84'	Report	(yellow card) 26' Kannemann; (yellow card) 53' Pinares; (yellow card) 60' Pepê; 81' Thaciano; (yellow card) 90+1' Diego Souza	Stadium: Vila Belmiro; Attendance: 0 Referee: (Colombia) Wilmar Roldán

===== Semifinal =====
6 January 2021 1st Leg	Boca Juniors (Argentina)	0–0	(Brazil) Santos	Buenos Aires, Argentina
19:15 UTC−03:00	Villa (yellow card) 85'	Report		Stadium: La Bombonera; Attendance: 0 Referee: (Chile) Roberto Tobar

13 January 2021 2nd Leg	Santos (Brazil)	3–0 (3–0 agg.)	(Argentina) Boca Juniors	Santos
19:15 UTC−03:00	Diego Pituca 16' (yellow card) 45+4'; Soteldo 49'; Lucas Braga 51'	Report	(yellow card) 27' Salvio; (red card) 56' Fabra; (yellow card) 66' Izquierdoz	Stadium: Vila Belmiro; Attendance: 0 Referee: (Colombia) Wilmar Roldán

===== Final =====
30 January 2021 Single match	Palmeiras (Brazil)	1–0	(Brazil) Santos	Rio de Janeiro
17:00 UTC−03:00	Gómez (yellow card) 35'; Viña (yellow card) 58'; Marcos Rocha (yellow card) 90+7'; Breno Lopes 90+9' (yellow card) 90+9'	Report	(yellow card) 10' Lucas Veríssimo; (yellow card) 70' Diego Pituca; (yellow card) 90+6' Soteldo; (yellow card) 90+13' Alison	Stadium: Maracanã; Attendance: 0 Referee: (Argentina) Patricio Loustau
