= Laércio Soldá =

Brazilian footballer

Laércio
Personal information
- Full name: Laércio Soldá
- Date of birth: 22 March 1993 (age 33)
- Place of birth: Marau, Brazil
- Height: 1.92 m (6 ft 4 in)
- Position: Centre-back

Youth career
- Gaúcho
- Passo Fundo
- Ypiranga-RS
- –2012: Lajeadense
- 2012: → Helsingborg (loan)

Senior career*
Years	Team	Apps	(Gls)
2013–2016	Lajeadense	21	(3)
2017–2020	Caxias	32	(5)
2017	→ Boa Esporte (loan)	4	(0)
2020–2021	Santos	14	(0)
2021	Chapecoense	14	(2)
2022	Santo André	1	(0)
2022–2024	Sukhothai	49	(0)
Total		135	(10)
- * Club domestic league appearances and goals

Laércio Soldá (born 22 March 1993), known simply as Laércio (Brazilian Portuguese: [lɐˈɛɾsiu]), is a Brazilian retired footballer who played as a centre-back.

== Club career ==
=== Lajeadense ===
Born in Marau, Rio Grande do Sul, Laércio represented Gaúcho, Passo Fundo, Ypiranga-RS and Lajeadense as a youth. In January 2012, he moved abroad and joined Swedish side Helsingborgs IF on loan.

Laércio was promoted to Lajeadense's first team for the 2013 season, and made his senior debut on 17 February of that year by starting and scoring the opener in a 3–0 Campeonato Gaúcho home win against Santa Cruz-RS. He began to appear regularly during the Série D, but spent the first half of the 2014 campaign sidelined due to an injury.

A starter in 2015, Laércio spent the entire 2016 season out nursing a knee injury.

=== Caxias ===
On 12 December 2016, Laércio was presented at Caxias. The following 15 July, he was loaned to Boa Esporte in the Série B until the end of the year, but featured rarely for the side.

Upon returning, Laércio was initially a backup option until the 2020 season, where he established himself as a first-choice as his side finished second in the Gauchão. He was also named the Man of the Match in the Final against Grêmio.

On 8 September 2020, Laércio terminated his contract with Caxias.

=== Santos ===
In September 2020, shortly after leaving Caxias, Laércio started training with Santos, but was unable to sign a contract due to the club's transfer ban. On 9 October, once the ban was lifted, he signed a contract with the club until December 2021.

Laércio made his Peixe – and Série A – debut on 11 October 2020, replacing Felipe Jonatan in a 2–1 home win against Grêmio. He scored his first goal for the club on 16 December, netting his side's fourth in a 4–1 Copa Libertadores home routing of the same opponent; it was also his debut in the competition.

=== Later career ===
On 1 April 2021, Laércio signed a contract with fellow first division side Chapecoense until December 2022. The following 3 February, he joined Santo André.

On 29 June 2022, after just one match for Ramalhão, Laércio moved abroad for the first time in his career and signed for Thai League 1 side Sukhothai. He left the club in 2024, and subsequently retired.

== Career statistics ==
Appearances and goals by club, season and competition
Club	Season	League			State League		Cup		Continental		Other		Total	
Club	Season	Division	Apps	Goals	Apps	Goals	Apps	Goals	Apps	Goals	Apps	Goals	Apps	Goals
Lajeadense	2013	Série D	6	1	1	1	—		—		1 (Note: Appearance(s) in Copa FGF)	0	8	2
Lajeadense	2014	Gaúcho	—		0	0	0	0	—		10	0	10	0
Lajeadense	2015	Série D	10	1	4	0	0	0	—		7	0	21	1
Lajeadense	2016	Gaúcho	—		0	0	0	0	—		—		0	0
Lajeadense	Total		16	2	5	1	0	0	—		18	0	39	3
Caxias	2017	Gaúcho	—		4	0	—		—		—		4	0
Caxias	2018	Série D	1	0	9	3	1	0	—		—		11	3
Caxias	2019	Série D	5	0	1	0	—		—		13	2	19	2
Caxias	2020	Série D	0	0	12	2	1	0	—		—		13	2
Caxias	Total		6	0	26	5	2	0	—		13	2	47	7
Boa Esporte (loan)	2017	Série B	4	0	—		—		—		—		4	0
Santos	2020	Série A	14	0	—		—		2 (Note: Appearance(s) in Copa Libertadores)	1	—		16	1
Santos	2021	Série A	0	0	—		0	0	0	0	—		0	0
Santos	Total		14	0	—		0	0	2	1	—		16	1
Chapecoense	2021	Série A	7	0	7	2	2	0	—		—		16	2
Santo André	2022	Série D	—		1	0	—		—		—		1	0
Sukhothai	2022–23	Thai League 1	25	0	—		0	0	—		1 (Note: Appearance(s) in Thai League Cup)	0	26	0
Sukhothai	2023–24	Thai League 1	24	0	—		2	0	—		1	0	27	0
Sukhothai	Total		49	0	—		2	0	—		2	0	53	0
Career total			96	2	39	8	6	0	2	1	33	2	176	13

== Honours ==
Lajeadense

- Copa FGF: 2014, 2015
