= Wagner Leonardo =

Brazilian footballer (born 1999)

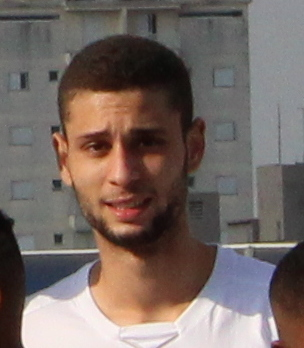

Personal information
- Full name: Wagner Leonardo Calbelo de Souza
- Date of birth: 23 July 1999 (age 27)
- Place of birth: Praia Grande, Brazil
- Height: 1.86 m (6 ft 1 in)
- Position: Centre back

Team information
- Current team: Grêmio
- Number: 3

Youth career
- 2009–2019: Santos

Senior career*
| Years | Team | Apps | (Gls) |
| 2019–2022 | Santos | 30 | (1) |
| 2021 | → Náutico (loan) | 16 | (2) |
| 2022 | → Fortaleza (loan) | 0 | (0) |
| 2022 | → Cruzeiro (loan) | 6 | (1) |
| 2023 | Portimonense | 1 | (0) |
| 2023 | → Vitória (loan) | 19 | (4) |
| 2023–2025 | Vitória | 67 | (7) |
| 2025– | Grêmio | 41 | (2) |
- * Club domestic league appearances and goals as of 7 April 2026

Wagner Leonardo Calvelo de Souza (born 23 July 1999), known as Wagner Leonardo (Brazilian Portuguese: [ˈvaɡneʁ leoˈnaʁdu]), is a Brazilian footballer who plays for Campeonato Brasileiro Série A club Grêmio. Mainly a central defender, he can also play as a defensive midfielder.

== Club career ==
=== Santos ===
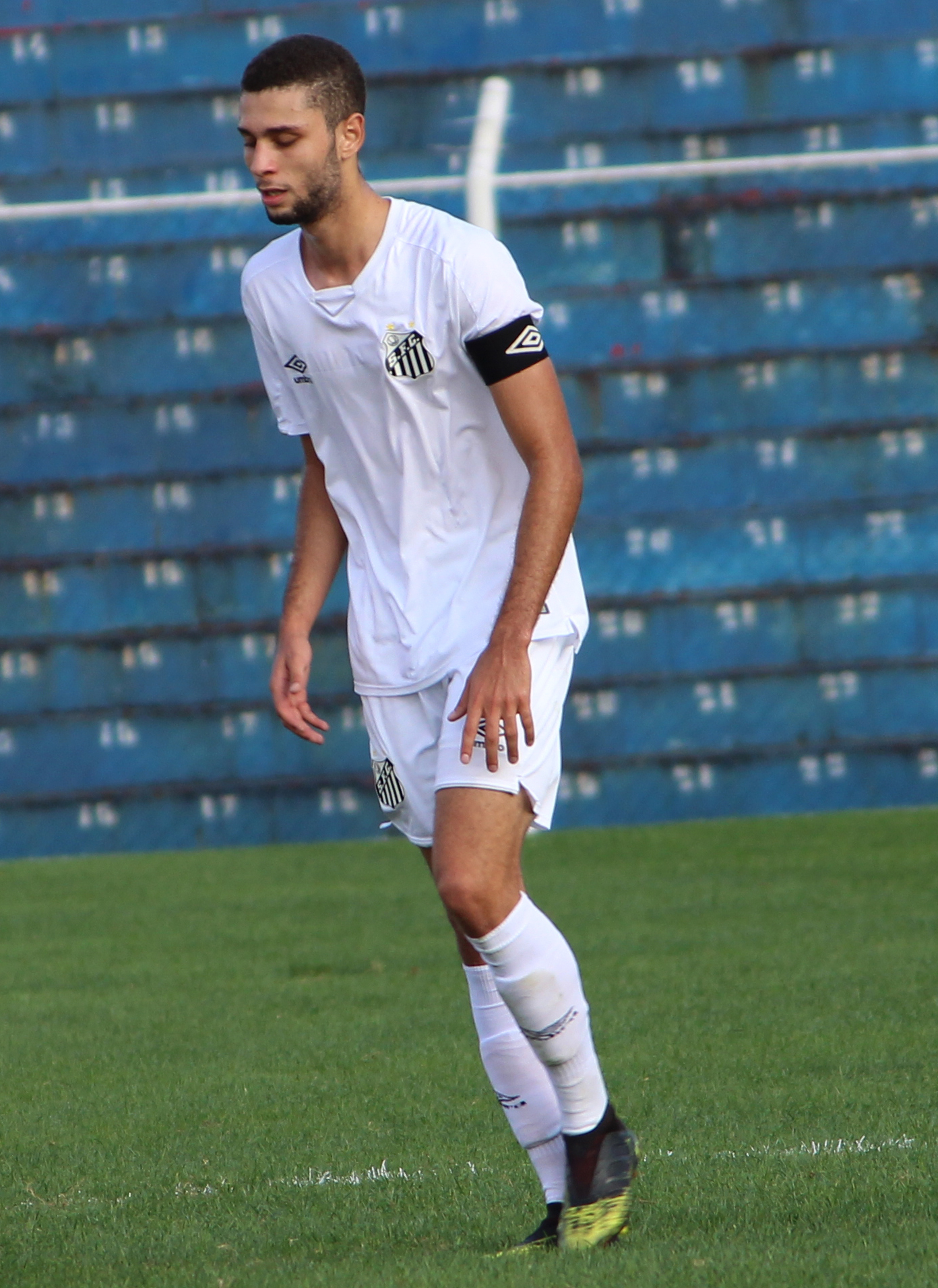
Wagner Leonardo with Santos in 2019

Born in Praia Grande, São Paulo, Wagner joined Santos' youth setup in 2009 at the age of nine. In February 2019, after appearing in the year's Copa São Paulo de Futebol Júnior, he was promoted to the first team by manager Jorge Sampaoli.

Wagner made his first team debut on 7 March 2019, coming on as a second-half substitute for fellow youth graduate Gustavo Henrique in a 4–0 home routing of América-RN, for the year's Copa do Brasil. He made his Série A debut on 9 September of the following year, replacing Alex in a 3–1 home win against Atlético Mineiro.

Wagner made his Copa Libertadores debut on 20 October 2020, replacing Felipe Jonatan in a 2–1 home win against Defensa y Justicia. On 8 January 2021, he and teammate John tested positive for COVID-19.

On 2 April 2021, Wagner was loaned to Série B side Náutico for the season. He became a regular starter for the side, and scored his first goal on 26 April in a 2–2 Campeonato Pernambucano home draw against Afogados.

On 8 July 2021, Wagner was recalled by Santos. He scored his first goal for the club on 10 October, netting the winner in a 1–0 home success over Grêmio.

On 21 December 2021, Wagner moved to Fortaleza on loan until March 2023, with a buyout clause. The following 12 March, after failing to make an appearance with the club, he moved to Cruzeiro also in a temporary deal.

=== Portimonense ===
On 24 December 2022, Wagner terminated his contract with Santos and moved abroad with Portuguese side Portimonense.

=== Vitória ===
On 5 April 2023, Wagner was presented on loan at Vitória. On 1 August, after being an undisputed starter, the club bought 50% of his economic rights and the player signed a contract until the end of 2025.

== Career statistics ==
As of 1 December 2023

| Club | Season | League | | | State League | | Cup | | Continental | | Other | | Total | |
| Club | Season | Division | Apps | Goals | Apps | Goals | Apps | Goals | Apps | Goals | Apps | Goals | Apps | Goals |
|---|---|---|---|---|---|---|---|---|---|---|---|---|---|---|
| Santos | 2019 | Série A | 0 | 0 | 0 | 0 | 1 | 0 | — | | — | | 1 | 0 |
| Santos | 2020 | Série A | 12 | 0 | 0 | 0 | 0 | 0 | 4 (Note: Appearance(s) in Copa Libertadores) | 0 | — | | 16 | 0 |
| Santos | 2021 | Série A | 16 | 1 | 2 | 0 | 3 | 0 | 2 (Note: Appearance(s) in Copa Sudamericana) | 0 | — | | 23 | 1 |
| Santos | Total | | 28 | 1 | 2 | 0 | 4 | 0 | 6 | 0 | — | | 40 | 1 |
| Náutico (loan) | 2021 | Série B | 8 | 0 | 8 | 2 | 0 | 0 | — | | — | | 16 | 2 |
| Fortaleza (loan) | 2022 | Série A | 0 | 0 | — | | 0 | 0 | — | | 0 | 0 | 0 | 0 |
| Cruzeiro (loan) | 2022 | Série B | 5 | 1 | 1 | 0 | 0 | 0 | — | | — | | 6 | 1 |
| Portimonense | 2022–23 | Primeira Liga | 1 | 0 | — | | 0 | 0 | — | | — | | 1 | 0 |
| Vitória | 2023 | Série B | 35 | 5 | — | | — | | — | | — | | 35 | 5 |
| Career total | | | 77 | 7 | 11 | 2 | 4 | 0 | 6 | 0 | 0 | 0 | 98 | 9 |

== Honours ==
Nautico

- Campeonato Pernambucano: 2021

Cruzeiro

- Campeonato Brasileiro Série B: 2022

Vitória

- Campeonato Brasileiro Série B: 2023

Grêmio

- Campeonato Gaúcho: 2026
- Recopa Gaúcha: 2025
