= Sandry =

Brazilian footballer (born 2002)

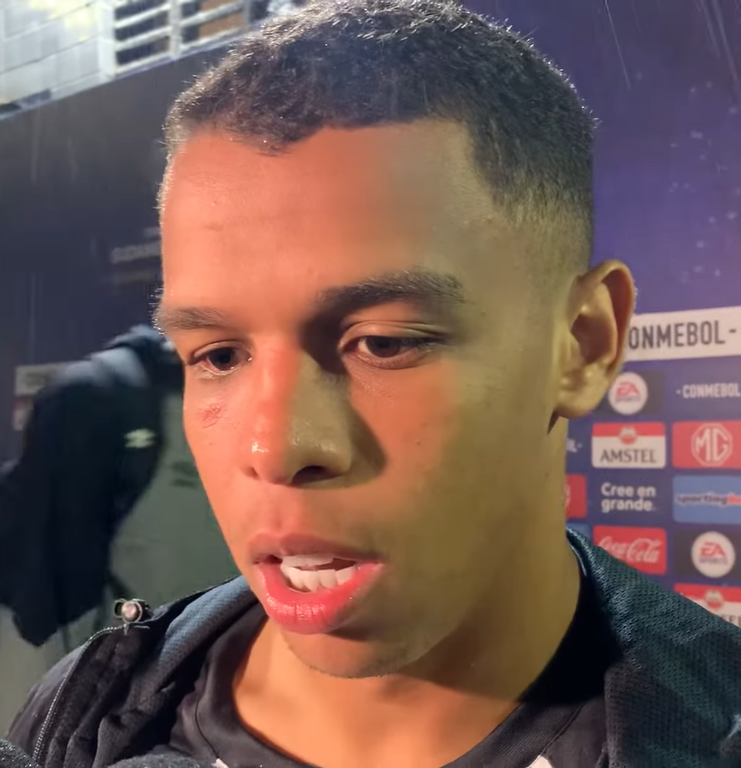
- Sandry in 2023

Personal information
- Full name: Sandry Roberto Santos Goes
- Date of birth: 30 August 2002 (age 24)
- Place of birth: Itabuna, Brazil
- Height: 1.74 m (5 ft 9 in)
- Position: Defensive midfielder

Youth career
- Ciso
- AABB Itabuna
- 2013–2019: Santos

Senior career*
Years	Team	Apps	(Gls)
2019–2026	Santos	83	(0)
2025	→ Athletic-MG (loan)	30	(0)
2026	→ Criciúma (loan)	11	(0)

International career^{‡}
2017	Brazil U15		
2019	Brazil U17	9	(0)
- * Club domestic league appearances and goals as of 15:33, 19 May 2026 (UTC) ‡ National team caps and goals as of 14 November 2019

Sandry Roberto Santos Goes (born 30 August 2002), simply known as Sandry (Brazilian Portuguese: [sɐ̃nˈdɾi]), is a Brazilian footballer who plays as a defensive midfielder.

== Club career ==
=== Santos ===
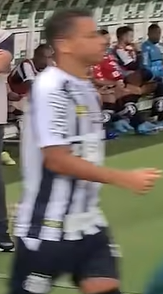
Sandry with Santos in 2022

Sandry was born in Itabuna, Bahia, to Brazilian and Malagasy roots, Sandry joined Santos' youth setup in 2013, aged ten. In 2018, aged only 15, he appeared with the under-20s in the year's Copa São Paulo de Futebol Júnior.

Called up to the first team by new manager Jorge Sampaoli, Sandry made his debut with the main squad on 31 January 2019, coming on as a late substitute for goalscorer Derlis González in a 4–1 Campeonato Paulista away routing of Bragantino. On 5 August, after lengthy negotiations, he signed a professional contract with the club.

Sandry made his Série A debut on 8 December 2019, replacing goalscorer Carlos Sánchez late into a 4–0 home routing of Flamengo. He made his Copa Libertadores debut the following 20 October, replacing Jobson in a 2–1 home win against Defensa y Justicia.

On 10 November 2020, it was announced that Sandry and a further six first team players tested positive for COVID-19. On 3 April of the following year, it was announced that he suffered a knee injury, being sidelined for at least six months.

On 17 June 2021, Sandry renewed his contract with Santos until May 2026. Back to action in November, he returned to feature regularly for the side before suffering a facial injury in February 2023; he recovered in April, but had an infection in the region in May.

On 10 August 2023, Sandry suffered another knee injury, being sidelined for the remainder of the season. He returned to action on 8 June 2024, in a 3–1 Série B away loss to Novorizontino.

==== Loan to Athletic-MG ====
On 1 March 2025, after being separated from the squad during the 2025 Campeonato Paulista, Sandry agreed to join Athletic-MG on loan for the remainder of the year. He featured in 30 Série B matches, helping the club to avoid relegation.

==== Loan to Criciúma ====
On 6 January 2026, Sandry agreed to join Criciúma on loan for the year. Despite being regularly used in the Campeonato Catarinense, he left the club in June, after more than a month absent from training.

==== Contract termination ====
On 11 September 2026, after being separated from the first team squad, Sandry rescinded his contract with Santos.

== International career ==
During the 2017 season, Sandry featured in Brazil under-15s' matches regularly. On 20 September 2019, he was included in Guilherme Dalla Déa's 21-man list for the 2019 FIFA U-17 World Cup, featuring mainly as a substitute as his side lifted the trophy for the fourth time.

== Personal life ==
Sandry's father Nenenzinho was also a footballer and a midfielder. He was named after manager Lori Sandri, after his parents were watching a football match on the TV and "thought the name was pretty".

== Career statistics ==
As of 19 May 2026

Appearances and goals by club, season and competition
Club	Season	League			State League		Cup		Continental		Other		Total	
Club	Season	Division	Apps	Goals	Apps	Goals	Apps	Goals	Apps	Goals	Apps	Goals	Apps	Goals
Santos	2019	Série A	1	0	1	0	1	0	0	0	—		3	0
Santos	2020	Série A	18	0	2	0	2	0	7 (Note: Appearance(s) in Copa Libertadores)	0	—		29	0
Santos	2021	Série A	4	0	2	0	0	0	2	0	—		8	0
Santos	2022	Série A	22	0	7	0	5	0	5 (Note: Appearance(s) in Copa Sudamericana)	0	—		39	0
Santos	2023	Série A	5	0	9	0	0	0	1	0	—		15	0
Santos	2024	Série B	12	0	—		—		—		—		12	0
Santos	Total		62	0	21	0	8	0	15	0	—		106	0
Athletic-MG (loan)	2025	Série B	30	0	—		1	0	—		—		31	0
Criciúma (loan)	2026	Série B	0	0	11	0	0	0	—		—		11	0
Career total			92	0	32	0	9	0	15	0	0	0	148	0

== Honours ==
Santos

- Campeonato Brasileiro Série B: 2024

Brazil U17

- FIFA U-17 World Cup: 2019
