= Ivonei =

Brazilian footballer (born 2002)

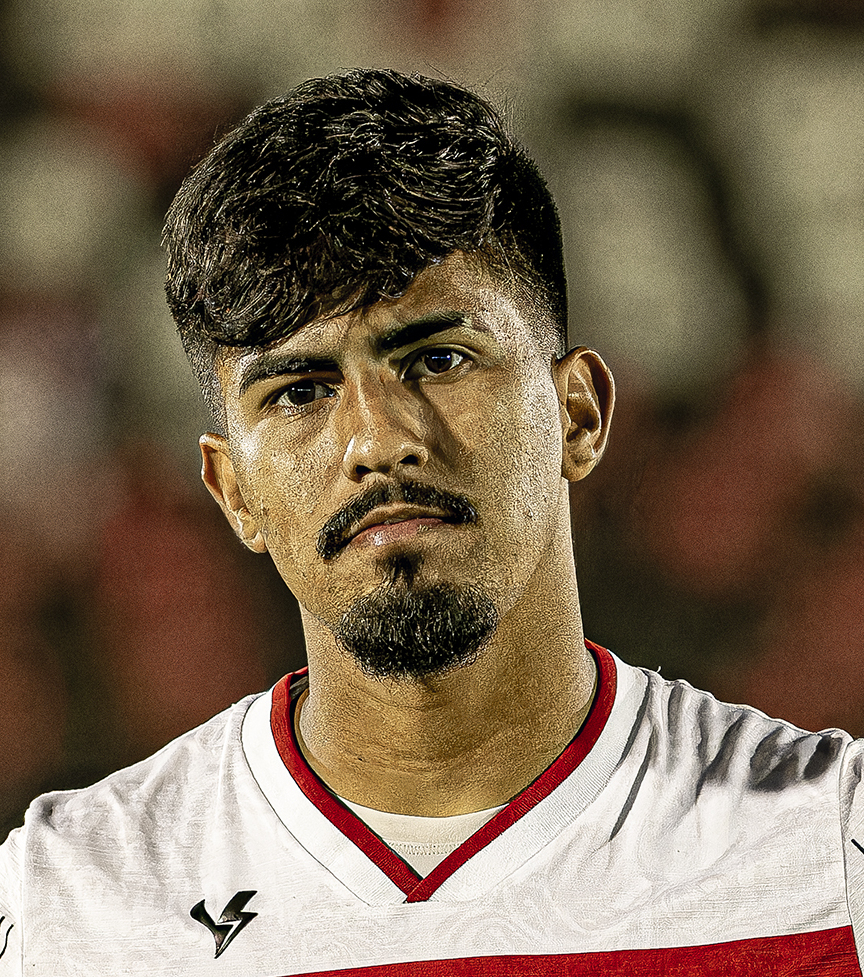
- Ivonei with Botafogo-SP in 2023

Personal information
- Full name: Ivonei Júnior da Silva Rabelo
- Date of birth: 16 April 2002 (age 24)
- Place of birth: Rondonópolis, Brazil
- Height: 1.80 m (5 ft 11 in)
- Position: Midfielder

Team information
- Current team: Al Bataeh
- Number: 8

Youth career
- 2006–2013: Vila Aurora
- 2013–2023: Santos

Senior career*
Years	Team	Apps	(Gls)
2020–2024	Santos	27	(1)
2023	→ Botafogo-SP (loan)	17	(0)
2024–	Al Bataeh	1	(0)

International career^{‡}
2017	Brazil U15	3	(1)
2018	Brazil U17	1	(1)
- * Club domestic league appearances and goals as of 15:17, 5 December 2023 (UTC) ‡ National team caps and goals as of 2 December 2018

Ivonei Júnior da Silva Rabelo (born 16 April 2002), simply known as Ivonei, is a Brazilian footballer who plays for Al Bataeh as a midfielder.

== Club career ==
Born in Rondonópolis, Mato Grosso, Ivonei joined Santos' youth setup in 2013, from Vila Aurora. On 2 October 2018, he signed his first professional contract with the club, until 2021.

In June 2020, after the COVID-19 pandemic, Ivonei was promoted to the main squad by manager Jesualdo Ferreira. He made his professional – and Série A – debut on 13 August, coming on as a second-half substitute for fellow youth graduate Alison in a 2–0 away loss against Internacional.

Ivonei made his Copa Libertadores debut on 1 October 2020, replacing Jobson in a 3–2 away win against Club Olimpia. On 23 October, he renewed his contract with the club until July 2025.

Ivonei scored his first professional goal on 14 November 2020, netting the opener in a 2–0 home win against Internacional; it was also his first career start. He subsequently featured rarely during the 2021 season before being demoted back to the under-20 squad in March 2022.

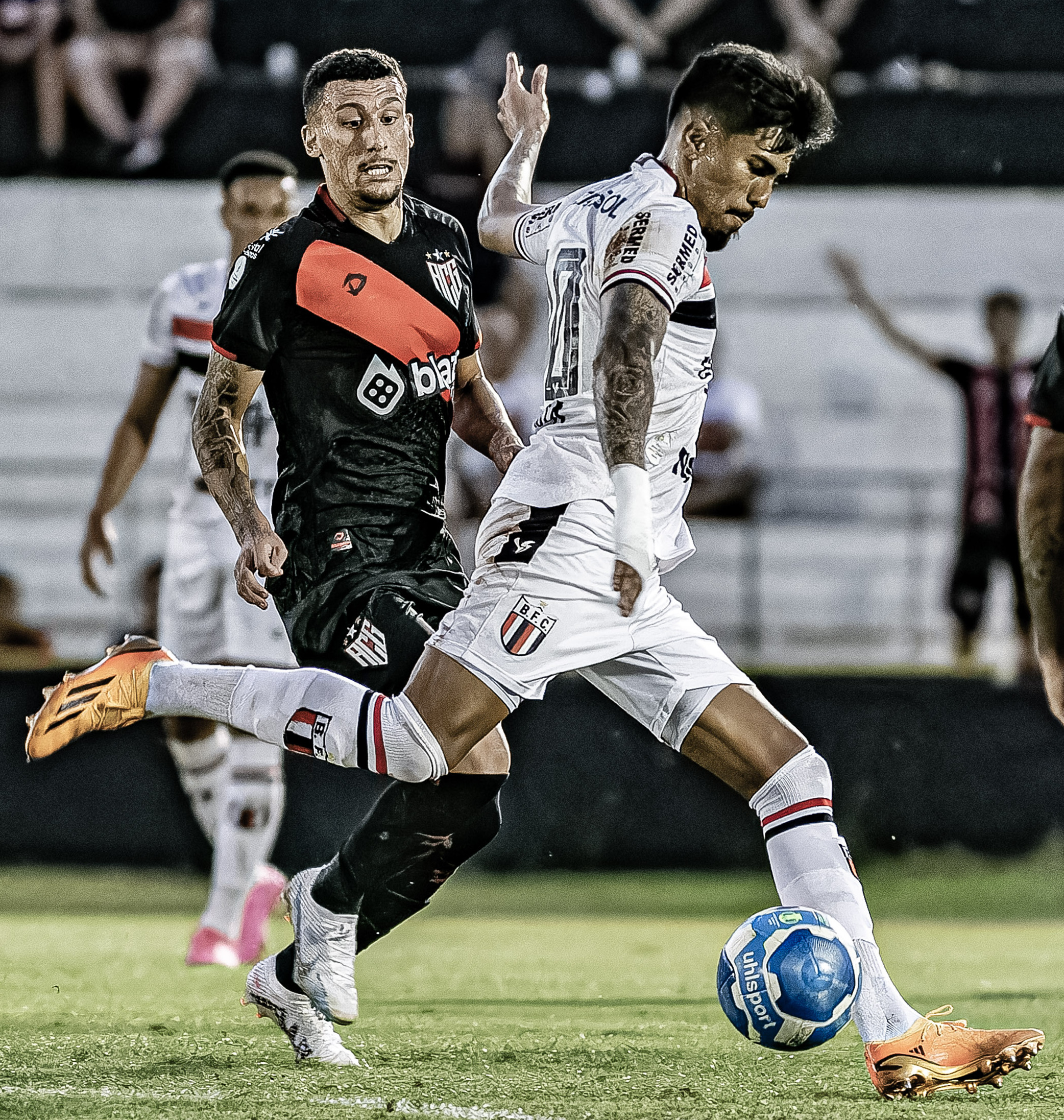
Ivonei (in white) playing for Botafogo-SP in 2023

Back to the main squad for the 2023 season, Ivonei featured rarely before being separated from the first team squad by new head coach Paulo Turra on 4 July 2023. Eight days later, he was loaned to Série B side Botafogo-SP for the remainder of the year.

After returning from loan, Ivonei was not included in the first team squad of Peixe, and rescinded his contract with the club on 13 June 2024.

== International career ==
On 27 October 2017, Ivonei was called up to Brazil under-15 football team for the 2017 South American U-15 Championship in Argentina. He scored one goal during the competition, in a 3–1 home defeat of Venezuela, as his side finished second.

== Personal life ==
Ivonei's father Nei was also a footballer, who notably represented Vila Aurora, a team from Rondonópolis.

== Career statistics ==
As of 5 December 2023

Club	Season	League			State League		Cup		Continental		Other		Total	
Club	Season	Division	Apps	Goals	Apps	Goals	Apps	Goals	Apps	Goals	Apps	Goals	Apps	Goals
Santos	2020	Série A	13	1	0	0	0	0	1 (Note: Appearance(s) in Copa Libertadores)	0	—		14	1
Santos	2021	Série A	5	0	4	0	4	0	3 (Note: Two appearances in Copa Libertadores, one appearance in Copa Sudamericana)	0	2 (Note: Appearance(s) in Copa Paulista)	0	18	0
Santos	2022	Série A	0	0	0	0	0	0	0	0	—		0	0
Santos	2023	Série A	1	0	4	0	1	0	3 (Note: Appearance(s) in Copa Sudamericana)	0	—		9	0
Santos	Total		19	1	8	0	5	0	7	0	2	0	41	1
Botafogo-SP (loan)	2023	Série B	17	0	—		—		—		—		17	0
Career total			36	1	8	0	5	0	7	0	2	0	58	1
