= Fernando Pileggi =

Brazilian footballer (born 1999)

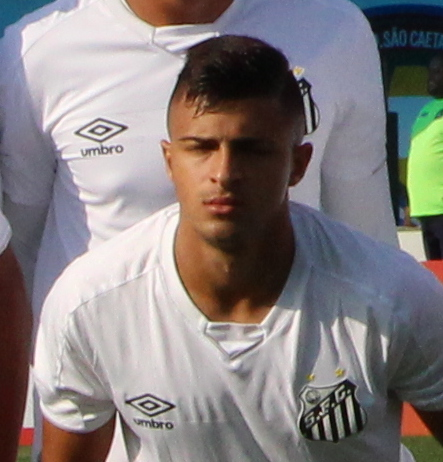

Personal information
- Full name: Fernando Moraes Pileggi
- Date of birth: 6 July 1999 (age 27)
- Place of birth: São Paulo, Brazil
- Height: 1.72 m (5 ft 8 in)
- Position: Right back

Youth career
- 2013: Grêmio Osasco
- 2014–2015: Paulista
- 2016–2018: Juventus-SP
- 2018–2019: Santos

Senior career*
Years	Team	Apps	(Gls)
2018–2021	Santos	2	(0)
2021	→ Santa Cruz (loan)	1	(0)
2022	Grêmio Prudente	15	(0)
2023	Cianorte	2	(0)
2023	Treze	3	(0)
Total		23	(0)
- * Club domestic league appearances and goals

Fernando Moraes Pileggi (born 6 July 1999), known as Fernando Pileggi (Brazilian Portuguese: [feʁˈnɐ̃ndu pilɛˈʒi]) or simply Fernando, is a Brazilian retired footballer who played as a right back.

== Club career ==
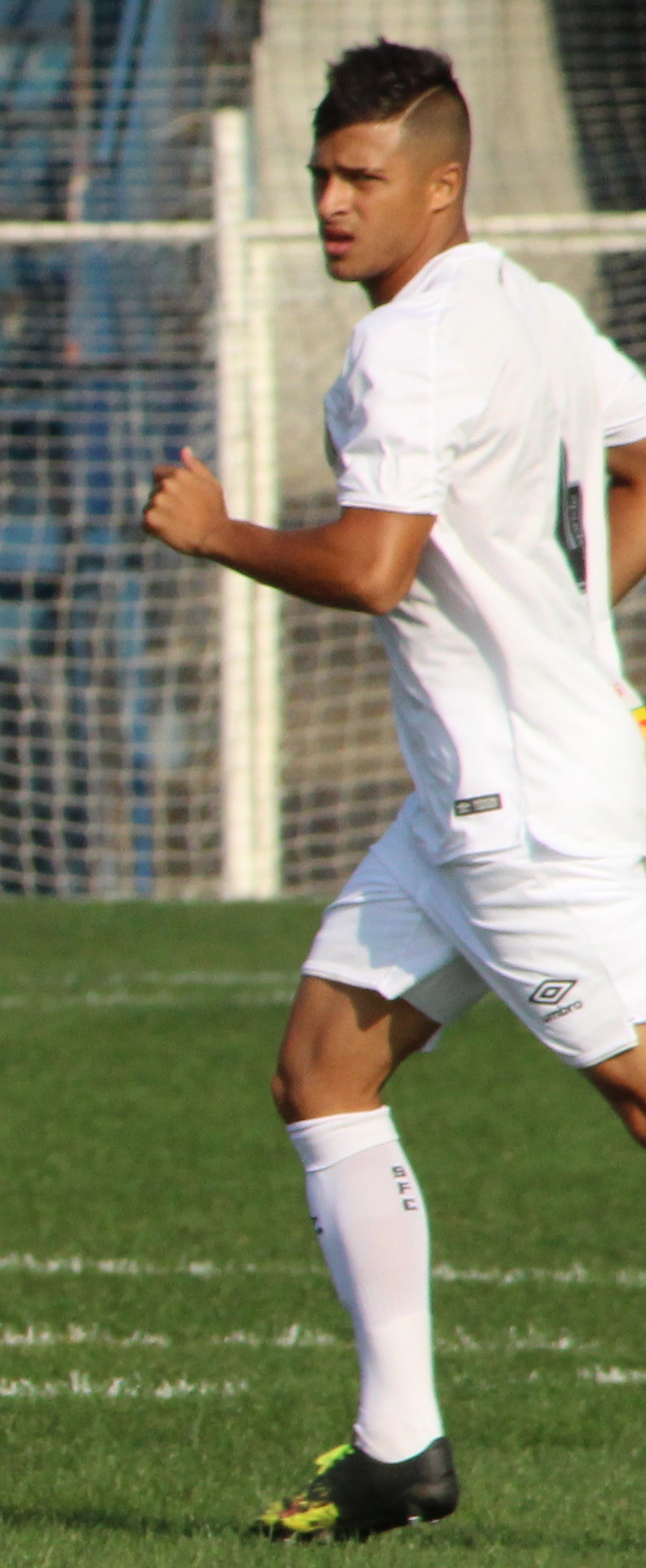
Fernando playing for the under-20 side of Santos in 2019

Born in São Paulo, Fernando started his career with Grêmio Osasco in 2013. He moved to Paulista in the following year, playing for the under-15 and under-17 categories before joining Juventus-SP in 2016.

On 5 June 2018, Fernando signed a contract with Santos until December 2019, and was initially assigned to the under-20s. He made his senior debut with the B-team on 23 August, coming on as a second-half substitute in a 0–0 home draw against Santo André for the year's Copa Paulista.

Fernando made his professional – and Série A – debut on 20 December 2020, starting in a 0–1 away loss against Vasco da Gama but being replaced at half-time. The following 12 April, after one further appearance with the main squad, he was loaned to Série C side Santa Cruz for the season.

Fernando played only one match for Santa before rescinding his contract with Santos, which was due to expire in December, on 16 November 2021.

== Career statistics ==
As of 19 October 2023

Club	Season	League			State League		Cup		Continental		Other		Total	
Club	Season	Division	Apps	Goals	Apps	Goals	Apps	Goals	Apps	Goals	Apps	Goals	Apps	Goals
Santos	2018	Série A	0	0	0	0	0	0	—		6 (Note: Appearance(s) in Copa Paulista)	0	6	0
Santos	2019	Série A	0	0	0	0	0	0	—		—		0	0
Santos	2020	Série A	2	0	—		0	0	0	0	—		2	0
Santos	2021	Série A	0	0	—		0	0	—		—		0	0
Santos	Total		2	0	0	0	0	0	0	0	6	0	8	0
Santa Cruz (loan)	2021	Série C	0	0	1	0	0	0	—		0	0	1	0
Grêmio Prudente	2022	Paulista 2ª Divisão	—		15	0	—		—		—		15	0
Cianorte	2023	Paranaense	—		2	0	—		—		—		2	0
Treze	2023	Paraibano	—		3	0	—		—		—		3	0
Career total			2	0	21	0	0	0	0	0	6	0	29	0

== Honours ==
Grêmio Prudente

- Campeonato Paulista Segunda Divisão: 2022
