= Derick (footballer) =

Brazilian footballer (born 2002)

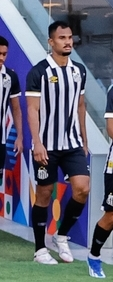
- Derick with Santos in 2024

Personal information
- Full name: Derick Fernando da Silva
- Date of birth: 16 May 2002 (age 24)
- Place of birth: Santos, Brazil
- Height: 1.94 m (6 ft 4 in)
- Position: Centre back

Team information
- Current team: Arda

Youth career
- 2010–2011: Legionários
- 2012–2013: Ponte Preta
- 2014: Sumaré
- 2015–2022: Santos

Senior career*
Years	Team	Apps	(Gls)
2020–2024	Santos	2	(0)
2023	→ Pouso Alegre (loan)	2	(0)
2024–2025	Lusitânia	20	(2)
2025–2026	Varzim	16	(2)
2026–	Arda	0	(0)

International career
2017	Brazil U15	3	(0)
2018	Brazil U17	5	(0)
- * Club domestic league appearances and goals as of 11 July 2026

Derick Fernando da Silva (born 16 May 2002), simply known as Derick (Brazilian Portuguese: [ˈdɛɾik]), is a Brazilian footballer who plays as a central defender for Bulgarian First League club Arda Kardzhali.

== Club career ==
Born in Santos, São Paulo, Derick joined Santos' youth setup in March 2015, from Sumaré. On 4 October 2018, he signed his first professional contract after agreeing to a three-year deal.

On 8 September 2020, as starters Lucas Veríssimo and Luan Peres were suspended and immediate backup Luiz Felipe was injured, Derick was called up to the first team for a Série A match against Atlético Mineiro. He made his professional debut the following day, coming on as a second-half substitute for Madson in the 3–1 success at the Vila Belmiro.

On 27 April 2021, Derick renewed his contract with Santos until March 2026. However, he spent that season and the following two years appearing almost exclusively with the under-20 squad.

On 10 April 2023, Derick was loaned to Série C side Pouso Alegre until the end of the year. Upon returning, he was separated from the first team squad before rescinding his link with Santos on 9 September 2024.

On 29 September 2024, Derick moved abroad for the first time in his career and joined Portuguese side Lusitânia.

On 30 June 2026, he signed a three-year contract with Bulgarian club Arda Kardzhali.

== International career ==
Derick was called up to Brazil under-15s for the 2017 Nike Friendlies, playing in all three matches of the competition. During the 2018 season, he represented the under-17 squad in the Montaigu Tournament and in the Nike Friendlies.

== Career statistics ==
As of 29 June 2023

Club	Season	League			State League		Cup		Continental		Other		Total	
Club	Season	Division	Apps	Goals	Apps	Goals	Apps	Goals	Apps	Goals	Apps	Goals	Apps	Goals
Santos	2020	Série A	1	0	—		0	0	0	0	—		1	0
Santos	2021	Série A	0	0	—		0	0	—		4 (Note: Appearance(s) in Copa Paulista)	0	4	0
Santos	2022	Série A	1	0	0	0	0	0	0	0	—		1	0
Santos	Total		2	0	0	0	0	0	0	0	4	0	6	0
Pouso Alegre (loan)	2023	Série C	2	0	—		—		—		—		2	0
Career total			4	0	0	0	0	0	0	0	4	0	8	0
