= Anderson Ceará =

Brazilian footballer (born 1999)

Personal information
- Full name: Francisco Anderson de Jesus dos Santos
- Date of birth: 21 May 1999 (age 27)
- Place of birth: Tianguá, Brazil
- Height: 1.73 m (5 ft 8 in)
- Position: Attacking midfielder

Team information
- Current team: National Bank of Egypt

Youth career
- 2012–2018: Santos

Senior career*
Years	Team	Apps	(Gls)
2018–2023	Santos	4	(0)
2020–2021	→ CRB (loan)	3	(0)
2022	→ Maringá (loan)	9	(0)
2022–2023	→ Santa Cruz (loan)	18	(1)
2024–2026	FK Csíkszereda	79	(11)
2026–	National Bank of Egypt	0	(0)
- * Club domestic league appearances and goals as of 8 August 2026

Francisco Anderson de Jesus dos Santos (born 21 May 1999), known as Anderson Ceará (Brazilian Portuguese: [siɐˈɾa]), is a Brazilian footballer who plays as an attacking midfielder for Egyptian Premier League club National Bank of Egypt.

== Club career ==
=== Santos ===
Born in Tianguá, Ceará, Anderson Ceará joined Santos' youth setup in October 2012, aged 13. On 27 July 2018, he signed his first professional contract, agreeing to a deal until June 2021.

Anderson Ceará made his senior debut with the B-team on 8 August 2018, coming on as a second-half substitute in a 5–2 away win against Bragantino, for the year's Copa Paulista. He made his first team – and Série A – debut on 21 November, replacing goalscorer Rodrygo in a 1–1 home draw against Botafogo.

On 29 November 2018, Anderson Ceará suffered a knee injury, being sidelined for eight months. He returned to action in May 2019, but spent the remainder of that year with the youth setup.

In June 2020, Anderson Ceará was promoted to the main squad by manager Jesualdo Ferreira, and renewed until 2023 on 18 July. On 19 November, after receiving little playing time, he moved to CRB on loan until the end of the season.

On 13 December 2021, after again featuring very rarely, Anderson Ceará was loaned to Maringá until the end of the 2022 Campeonato Paranaense. The following 8 June, he was presented at Série D side Santa Cruz, also on loan.

On 22 October 2022, Anderson Ceará's loan with Santa was extended until the end of the 2023 Campeonato Pernambucano.

== Career statistics ==
As of 16 May 2026

Appearances and goals by club, season and competition
Club	Season	League			State league		National cup (Note: Includes Copa do Brasil, Cupa României)		Continental		Other		Total	
Club	Season	Division	Apps	Goals	Apps	Goals	Apps	Goals	Apps	Goals	Apps	Goals	Apps	Goals
Santos	2018	Série A	1	0	—		—		—		5 (Note: Appearance(s) in Copa Paulista)	0	6	0
Santos	2019	Série A	0	0	—		0	0	—		—		0	0
Santos	2020	Série A	1	0	1	0	0	0	0	0	—		2	0
Santos	2021	Série A	0	0	1	0	0	0	0	0	3	0	4	0
Santos	Total		2	0	2	0	0	0	0	0	8	0	12	0
CRB (loan)	2020	Série B	3	0	—		—		—		—		3	0
Maringá (loan)	2022	Paranaense	—		9	0	—		—		—		9	0
Santa Cruz (loan)	2022	Série D	7	1	—		—		—		—		7	1
Santa Cruz (loan)	2023	Série D	0	0	11	0	1	0	—		6 (Note: Appearance(s) in Copa do Nordeste)	1	18	1
Santa Cruz (loan)	Total		7	1	11	0	1	0	—		6	1	25	2
FK Csíkszereda	2023–24	Liga II	8	0	—		—		—		1 (Note: Appearance in Liga I promotion/relegation play-offs)	0	9	0
FK Csíkszereda	2024–25	Liga II	29	5	—		5	0	—		—		34	5
FK Csíkszereda	2025–26	Liga I	38	6	—		3	1	—		—		41	7
FK Csíkszereda	2026–27	Liga I	4	0	—		—		—		—		4	0
FK Csíkszereda	Total		79	11	—		8	1	—		1	0	88	12
National Bank of Egypt	2026–27	Egyptian Premier League	0	0	—		0	0	—		—		0	0
Career total			91	12	22	0	9	1	0	0	15	1	137	14
