= Brayan Krüger =

Brazilian footballer

Personal information
- Full name: Brayan Diogo Ijorski Krüger
- Date of birth: 4 January 2002 (age 24)
- Place of birth: Teutônia, Brazil
- Height: 1.87 m (6 ft 2 in)
- Position: Forward

Team information
- Current team: Avenida

Youth career
- 2016–2021: Guarani de Palhoça
- 2020–2021: → Santos (loan)

Senior career*
Years	Team	Apps	(Gls)
2022–2024	Guarani de Palhoça	19	(4)
2022	→ Lajeadense (loan)	0	(0)
2023	→ Ituano (loan)	3	(0)
2025–	Avenida	4	(0)
- * Club domestic league appearances and goals as of 18:47, 24 February 2025 (UTC)

Brayan Diogo Ijorski Krüger (born 4 January 2002) is a Brazilian footballer who plays as a forward for Avenida.

== Club career ==
Born in Teutônia, Rio Grande do Sul, Krüger started his career with Guarani de Palhoça in 2016. On 4 February 2019, he agreed to join Santos' under-17 squad, but left the club ten days later after alleging personal reasons.

On 12 January 2020, Krüger returned to Peixe on loan for two years, now being assigned to the under-20s. In October of that year, he was promoted to the main squad by manager Cuca, but never featured and later left the club in December 2021 as his loan expired.

Krüger returned to his parent club for the 2022 season, scoring four goals in 11 Campeonato Catarinense Série B appearances as his club failed to achieve promotion. In August of that year, he was loaned to Lajeadense for the Copa FGF, but featured very rarely.

On 29 March 2023, Krüger was announced at Série B side Ituano.

== Career statistics ==
As of 24 February 2025

Club	Season	League			State League		Cup		Continental		Other		Total	
Club	Season	Division	Apps	Goals	Apps	Goals	Apps	Goals	Apps	Goals	Apps	Goals	Apps	Goals
Guarani de Palhoça	2022	Catarinense Série B	—		11	4	—		—		—		11	4
Guarani de Palhoça	2023	Catarinense Série B	—		0	0	—		—		—		0	0
Guarani de Palhoça	2024	Catarinense Série B	—		8	0	—		—		—		8	0
Guarani de Palhoça	Total		—		19	4	—		—		—		19	4
Lajeadense (loan)	2022	Gaúcho Série A2	—		0	0	—		—		1 (Note: Appearance(s) in Copa FGF)	0	1	0
Ituano (loan)	2023	Série B	3	0	—		0	0	—		—		3	0
Avenida	2025	Gaúcho	—		4	0	—		—		—		4	0
Career total			3	0	23	4	0	0	0	0	1	0	27	4
