= Allanzinho =

Brazilian footballer (born 2000)

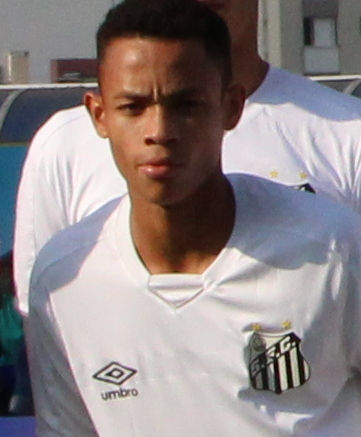

Personal information
- Full name: Allan Victor Oliveira Mota
- Date of birth: 4 April 2000 (age 26)
- Place of birth: Bertioga, Brazil
- Height: 1.78 m (5 ft 10 in)
- Position: Forward

Team information
- Current team: Juventude (on loan from Atlético Goianiense)
- Number: 20

Youth career
- 2018–2019: Portuguesa
- 2019–2021: Santos

Senior career*
Years	Team	Apps	(Gls)
2021–2023	Santos	1	(0)
2021	→ Guarani (loan)	24	(3)
2022	→ Tombense (loan)	3	(0)
2023	→ Joinville (loan)	0	(0)
2023	→ São Bernardo (loan)	4	(0)
2024	Politehnica Iași	12	(0)
2024–2025	Ferroviário	10	(4)
2025–	Fortaleza	9	(0)
2026	→ Atlético Goianiense (loan)	7	(0)
2026–	→ Juventude (loan)	9	(01)
- * Club domestic league appearances and goals as of 17 November 2026

Allan Victor Oliveira Mota (born 4 April 2000), commonly known as Allanzinho (Brazilian Portuguese: [alɐ̃ˈzĩɲu]), is a Brazilian footballer who plays as a forward for Juventude on loan from Fortaleza.

== Club career ==
=== Santos ===
Born in Bertioga, São Paulo, Allanzinho began his career with Portuguesa. On 9 April 2019, he terminated his contract with the club after alleging unpaid wages and joined Santos, being initially assigned to the under-20s.

Shortly after arriving, Allanzinho was promoted to Santos' first team by manager Jorge Sampaoli, and spent several months of the campaign training with the squad. On 24 June 2020, he renewed his contract until 2024.

On 25 February 2021, Allanzinho made his first team – and Série A – debut, coming on as a second-half substitute for Arthur Gomes in a 0–2 away loss against Bahia. He made his Copa Libertadores debut on 18 May, replacing Ângelo in a 1–2 away loss against The Strongest.

On 9 June 2021, Allanzinho was loaned to Série B side Guarani until the end of the year. He scored his first professional goal on 16 July, netting his team's fourth in a 4–1 away win against Confiança.

On 16 August 2022, Allanzinho was loaned to Tombense in the second division, until the end of the year. The following 10 February, he moved to Joinville also in a temporary deal.

On 7 April 2023, Allanzinho was loaned to Série C side São Bernardo, reuniting with Márcio Zanardi, his former head coach in the under-20s of Santos. On 11 January 2024, he left Santos after rescinding his contract.

=== Politehnica Iași ===
Shortly after leaving Santos, Allanzinho signed a two-year deal with Romanian Liga I side Politehnica Iași. He was released in June, after 12 goalless appearances.

=== Ferroviário ===
On 1 November 2024, Allanzinho returned to Brazil and signed for Ferroviário for the year's Taça Fares Lopes. He remained in the squad for the 2025 Campeonato Cearense, and became a spotlight for the side in the first two months of the season.

Allanzinho departed Ferrão in March 2025, after refusing a contract renewal.

=== Fortaleza ===
On 27 March 2025, Allanzinho was announced at Fortaleza back in the top tier, signing a contract until December 2027.

== Career statistics ==
As of 7 April 2025

Club	Season	League			State League		Cup		Continental		Other		Total	
Club	Season	Division	Apps	Goals	Apps	Goals	Apps	Goals	Apps	Goals	Apps	Goals	Apps	Goals
Santos	2020	Série A	1	0	0	0	0	0	0	0	—		1	0
Santos	2021	Série A	0	0	4	0	0	0	1 (Note: Appearance(s) in Copa Libertadores)	0	—		5	0
Santos	2022	Série A	0	0	2	0	0	0	—		—		2	0
Santos	Total		1	0	6	0	0	0	1	0	—		8	0
Guarani (loan)	2021	Série B	24	3	—		—		—		—		24	3
Tombense (loan)	2022	Série B	3	0	—		—		—		—		3	0
Joinville (loan)	2023	Catarinense	—		4	0	—		—		—		4	0
São Bernardo (loan)	2023	Série C	4	0	—		—		—		—		4	0
Politehnica Iași	2023–24	Liga I	12	0	—		—		—		—		12	0
Ferroviário	2024	Série C	—		—		—		—		7 (Note: Appearance(s) in Taça Fares Lopes)	1	7	1
Ferroviário	2025	Série D	0	0	10	4	1	0	—		7 (Note: Appearance(s) in Copa do Nordeste)	5	18	9
Ferroviário	Total		0	0	10	4	1	0	—		14	6	25	10
Fortaleza	2025	Série A	1	0	—		—		0	0	—		1	0
Career total			45	3	20	4	1	0	1	0	14	6	81	13
