= Raniel =

Brazilian footballer (born 1996)

Personal information
- Full name: Raniel Santana de Vasconcelos
- Date of birth: 11 June 1996 (age 30)
- Place of birth: Recife, Brazil
- Height: 1.81 m (5 ft 11 in)
- Positions: Forward; winger

Team information
- Current team: BG Pathum United
- Number: 7

Youth career
- Santa Cruz

Senior career*
Years	Team	Apps	(Gls)
2014–2016	Santa Cruz	41	(2)
2016–2017	→ Cruzeiro (loan)	23	(4)
2017–2019	Cruzeiro	66	(12)
2019	São Paulo	14	(1)
2020–2023	Santos	35	(3)
2022	→ Vasco da Gama (loan)	44	(16)
2023	Qingdao West Coast	25	(15)
2024	Khor Fakkan	10	(3)
2024–	BG Pathum United	34	(14)
- * Club domestic league appearances and goals as of 9 January 2026

Raniel Santana de Vasconcelos (born 11 June 1996), simply known as Raniel (Brazilian Portuguese: [ʁɐ̃niˈɛw]), is a Brazilian professional footballer who plays as a forward or a winger for Thai League 1 club BG Pathum United.

== Club career ==
=== Santa Cruz ===
Born in Recife, Pernambuco, Raniel started his career at futsal before moving to football, and was a Santa Cruz youth graduate. He made his first team debut on 9 March 2014, coming on as a second-half substitute for Carlos Alberto in a 7–0 home routing of Salgueiro.

Raniel made his Série B debut on 19 April 2014, starting in a 1–1 home draw against ABC. On 21 July, he was preventively suspended for 30 days after failing a doping exam; the substance was later revealed to be cocaine.

Raniel was suspended for one year in November 2014, but he was able to play due to preliminary injunctions. He scored his first senior goal the following 21 March, netting the opener in a 3–0 home defeat of Serra Talhada.

In May 2015, Raniel was again suspended, being out of action until September. On 25 September, shortly after returning, he was suspended by FIFA until the following February, but Santa Cruz managed to overturn the decision in October.

=== Cruzeiro ===
On 19 March 2016, Santa Cruz agreed to loan Raniel to Cruzeiro, starting the following May, until December. Initially assigned to the under-20s, he was bought outright in January 2017.

Raniel made his first team debut for Cruzeiro on 5 February 2017, starting in a 2–1 home win against Tricordiano for the Campeonato Mineiro championship. His Série A debut occurred on 14 May, as he replaced goalscorer Ramón Ábila in a 1–0 home success over São Paulo.

Raniel scored his first goal for Raposa on 20 August 2017, netting the last of a 2–0 home win against Sport. The following 13 March, he renewed his contract until 2022.

=== São Paulo ===
On 5 July 2019, Raniel signed a five-year contract with fellow top tier club São Paulo. He made his debut for the club eight days later in a 1–1 home draw against Palmeiras, and scored his first goal in a 4–0 away routing of Chapecoense.

=== Santos ===
On 11 December 2019, Raniel agreed to a four-year deal with Santos, with Vitor Bueno moving in the opposite direction. He made his debut for the club the following 23 January, replacing Kaio Jorge at half-time in a 0–0 Campeonato Paulista home draw against Red Bull Bragantino.

Raniel scored his first goals for Peixe on 30 January 2020, netting a brace in a 2–0 home defeat of Inter de Limeira. He tested positive for COVID-19 in September, subsequently recovered, but in October contracted thrombosis in his right leg; the disease was also linked as a consequence of the COVID.

On 10 July 2021, after more than a year without playing, Raniel returned to action after coming on as a late substitute in a 2–3 away loss against Palmeiras.

On 4 January 2022, Raniel joined Vasco da Gama on loan until the end of the year. He helped the side in their return to the top tier with ten goals, and returned to his parent club in December.

Back to Santos for the 2023 season, Raniel was registered for the 2023 Campeonato Paulista after a request by head coach Odair Hellmann. On 13 March, after only featuring twice, he rescinded his contract.

=== Qingdao West Coast ===
On 7 April 2023, Raniel joined China League One club Qingdao West Coast. Scoring a hat-trick away against eventual champions Sichuan Jiuniu on 2 September 2023, he proceeded to score 15 goals in the season. Thus, he became the joint second top scorer of the league as Qingdao West Coast finish second and achieve promotion for the first time in club history to the Chinese Super League.

=== Khor Fakkan ===
On 9 January 2024, Raniel joined UAE Pro League club Khor Fakkan.

=== BG Pathum United ===
On 22 June 2024, Raniel moved to Thai League 1 club BG Pathum United.

== Career statistics ==
As of 2 December 2023

Club	Season	League			State League		Cup		Continental		Other		Total	
Club	Season	Division	Apps	Goals	Apps	Goals	Apps	Goals	Apps	Goals	Apps	Goals	Apps	Goals
Santa Cruz	2014	Série B	1	0	3	0	1	0	—		0	0	5	0
Santa Cruz	2015	Série B	7	1	8	1	0	0	—		0	0	15	2
Santa Cruz	2016	Série A	0	0	10	0	2	0	—		9 (Note: Appearance(s) in Copa do Nordeste)	0	21	0
Santa Cruz	Total		8	1	21	1	3	0	—		9	0	41	2
Cruzeiro	2017	Série A	10	2	3	0	8	1	0	0	—		21	3
Cruzeiro	2018	Série A	32	4	10	3	7	2	6 (Note: Appearance(s) in Copa Libertadores)	0	—		55	9
Cruzeiro	2019	Série A	2	0	8	3	0	0	1	0	—		11	3
Cruzeiro	Total		44	6	21	6	15	3	7	0	—		87	15
São Paulo	2019	Série A	14	1	—		—		—		—		14	1
Santos	2020	Série A	4	0	7	2	0	0	3	0	—		14	2
Santos	2021	Série A	15	1	—		2	0	1 (Note: Appearance(s) in Copa Sudamericana)	0	—		18	1
Santos	2023	Série A	0	0	2	0	0	0	0	0	—		2	0
Santos	Total		19	1	9	2	2	0	4	0	—		34	3
Vasco da Gama (loan)	2022	Série B	31	10	12	5	2	1	—		—		45	16
Qingdao West Coast	2023	China League One	25	15	—		2	0	—		—		27	15
Career total			141	34	63	14	24	4	11	0	9	0	248	52

== Honours ==
=== Club ===
Santa Cruz

- Campeonato Pernambucano: 2015, 2016
- Copa do Nordeste: 2016

Cruzeiro

- Copa do Brasil: 2017, 2018
- Campeonato Mineiro: 2018, 2019

=== Individual ===
- Campeonato Pernambucano Best Newcomer: 2015
