= Cuquinha =

Brazilian footballer and assistant manager (born 1969)

Personal information
- Full name: Avlamir Dirceo Stival
- Date of birth: 5 June 1969 (age 57)
- Place of birth: Curitiba, Brazil
- Position: Midfielder

Team information
- Current team: Santos (assistant)

Youth career
- Coritiba

Senior career*
Years	Team	Apps	(Gls)
1989–1990	Coritiba	5	(0)
1991	Santa Cruz-RS	14	(0)
1992	Brasil de Pelotas	0	(0)

Managerial career
- 2000: Inter de Limeira (assistant)
- 2000: Avaí (assistant)
- 2001: Inter de Lages (assistant)
- 2001: Remo (assistant)
- 2001–2002: Criciúma (assistant)
- 2002: Gama (assistant)
- 2003: Paraná (assistant)
- 2003: Goiás (assistant)
- 2004: São Paulo (assistant)
- 2004: Grêmio (assistant)
- 2005: Flamengo (assistant)
- 2005: Coritiba (assistant)
- 2005: São Caetano (assistant)
- 2006–2007: Botafogo (assistant)
- 2007–2008: Botafogo (assistant)
- 2008: Santos (assistant)
- 2008: Fluminense (assistant)
- 2009: Flamengo (assistant)
- 2009–2010: Fluminense (assistant)
- 2010–2011: Cruzeiro (assistant)
- 2011–2013: Atlético Mineiro (assistant)
- 2014–2015: Shandong Luneng (assistant)
- 2016: Palmeiras (assistant)
- 2017: Palmeiras (assistant)
- 2018: Santos (assistant)
- 2019: São Paulo (assistant)
- 2020–2021: Santos (assistant)
- 2021: Atlético Mineiro (assistant)
- 2022: Atlético Mineiro (assistant)
- 2023: Corinthians (assistant)
- 2024: Athletico Paranaense (assistant)
- 2025: Atlético Mineiro (assistant)
- 2026–: Santos (assistant)
- * Club domestic league appearances and goals

Avlamir Dirceo Stival (born 5 June 1969), commonly known as Cuquinha, is a Brazilian football coach and former player who played as a midfielder. He is the current assistant coach of Santos.

== Career ==
Born in Curitiba, Paraná, Cuquinha finished his formation with hometown side Coritiba. Promoted to the first team in 1989, he would only make his first team debut in the following year, but still featured rarely for the side. The remainder of his playing career consisted of one year at Santa Cruz-RS and one year at Brasil de Pelotas before retiring in 1992, aged just 23.

Cuquinha was invited to work with his brother in the end of 1999, becoming his assistant coach ever since. In October 2020, while working at Santos, he acted as an interim coach as Cuca was suspended in a 1–1 Série A away draw against Corinthians. In November of that year, he was again named interim as Cuca tested positive for COVID-19, but he himself also tested positive for the disease shortly after.

Cuquinha continued to work as Cuca's assistant in the following years, at Atlético Mineiro, Corinthians, Athletico Paranaense and back at Santos.

== Personal life ==
Cuquinha's older brother Cuca was also a footballer, who notably represented Grêmio and later became a coach. Their elder brother, Amauri, was a central defender who also played professionally.

== Career statistics ==
Club	Season	League			State League		Cup		Continental		Other		Total	
Club	Season	Division	Apps	Goals	Apps	Goals	Apps	Goals	Apps	Goals	Apps	Goals	Apps	Goals
Coritiba	1990	Série B	5	0	0	0	2	0	—		—		7	0
Santa Cruz-RS	1991	Gaúcho	—		14	0	—		—		—		14	0
Brasil de Pelotas	1992	Gaúcho	—		0	0	—		—		—		0	0
Career total			5	0	14	0	2	0	0	0	0	0	21	0

== Coaching statistics ==
As of 9 November 2020

Coaching record by team and tenure
Team	Nat	From	To	Record								Ref
Team	Nat	From	To	G	W	D	L	GF	GA	GD	Win %	Ref
Flamengo (interim) (Note: Interim head coach as Cuca was suspended)	(Brazil)	5 April 2009	5 April 2009	1	0	1	0	1	1	+0	0.00	
Santos (interim)	(Brazil)	7 October 2020	7 October 2020	1	0	1	0	1	1	+0	0.00	
Santos (interim) (Note: Interim head coach as Cuca tested positive for COVID-19)	(Brazil)	7 November 2020	10 November 2020	1	0	1	0	1	1	+0	0.00	
Santos (interim)	(Brazil)	1 December 2020	1 December 2020	1	0	0	1	0	1	−1	0.00	
Atlético Mineiro (interim)	(Brazil)	21 April 2021	21 April 2021	1	0	1	0	1	1	+0	0.00	
Santos (interim)	(Brazil)	19 April 2026	19 April 2026	1	0	0	1	2	3	−1	0.00	
Total				6	0	4	2	6	8	−2	0.00	—
