= Breno (footballer, born 2000) =

Brazilian footballer

Personal information
- Full name: Breno Washington Rodrigues da Silva
- Date of birth: 1 September 2000 (age 26)
- Place of birth: Santana, Brazil
- Height: 1.77 m (5 ft 10 in)
- Position: Defensive midfielder

Team information
- Current team: Figueirense
- Number: 14

Senior career*
Years	Team	Apps	(Gls)
2019–2021	Goiás	67	(0)
2022–2025	Botafogo	15	(1)
2023	→ Ceará (loan)	9	(0)
2024–2025	→ São Bernardo Futebol Clube (loan)	4	(0)
2025–	Figueirense	20	(1)
- * Club domestic league appearances and goals as of 10 November 2026

Breno Washington Rodrigues da Silva (born 1 September 2000), known simply as Breno, is a Brazilian professional footballer who plays as a defensive midfielder for Figueirense.

== Professional career ==
Breno made his professional debut with Goiás in a 3-0 Campeonato Brasileiro Série A win over Fluminense FC on 22 September 2019.
