= Teutônia =

Municipality of Rio Grande do Sul, Brazil

- Municipality
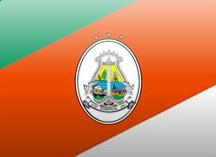
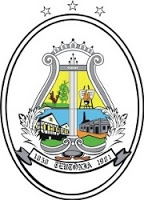
- Flag Coat of arms

- Location within Rio Grande do Sul

- Location in Brazil
- Coordinates: 29°26′S 51°48′W
- Country: Brazil
- State: Rio Grande do Sul

Government
  - Mayor: Renato Airton Altmann

Population (2024)
  - Total: ~32,797
- Time zone: UTC−3 (BRT)
- Area/distance code: 51
- Website: teutonia.rs.gov.br

Teutônia is a municipality in the state of Rio Grande do Sul, Brazil.

== History ==
Teutônia is a region that began being developed in 1858, when the merchant Carlos Schilling acquired vacant lands in the region. The name Teutônia has its origin in the prefix "Teuto-", which means of Germanic origin.

The first inhabitants arrived in greater number starting from 1865 and were German immigrants from the former colony of São Leopoldo, a settlement around 100 km from Teutônia. In 1868, more immigrants came from Germany, mainly from the regions of Westphalia, Pomerania, Saxony, Bohemia and Silesia. The Germans acquired land and devoted themselves to agriculture. Subsequently, small industries were created by immigrants, mainly focused on footwear, this industry remains until today.

Teutônia became a municipality in 1981, before it was part of the municipality of Estrela. The installation of the new city's government took place on January 31, 1983. The very first session of the City Council was chaired by city councilor and professor Selby Wallauer, and its first Mayor was Elton Klepker.

Miss Brazil 2012, Gabriela Markus, who is from Teutônia, represented Rio Grande do Sul in the contest, on September 29, 2012, and emerged victorious from there.

== Tourism ==
=== Moto Fest ===
Every year during May, in the celebrations of the city emancipation anniversary, one of the largest motorcycle events in the south of Brazil happen in Teutônia, the event is promoted by the local motorcycle club and has support from the local government. This event attracts visitors from different cities in the state, other states, as well as neighboring countries.

=== Harmony Lake ===
Harmony Lake is an artificial lake located at approximately 500 meters of altitude. One of the largest postcards of the municipality, its construction took place in the 1950s, led by Reinoldo Aschebrock, with the goal of storing water for the generation of electric energy, giving rise to the Cooperativa de Eletrificação Rural Teutônia Ltda (Certel), today the largest and oldest cooperative of its kind in Brazil.

=== International Gravity Sports Association World Championship ===
Certain categories of the IGSA Championship are often held in Teutônia, where the world's fastest athletes in this sport compete. The following categories are available: Street Sled, Street Luge, Skate Longboard, Inline skates and Dirt Surf. Competing athletes reach speeds up to 140 km/h. The championship always takes place in November, with over 200 athletes from all over the world competing and it attracts more than 3 thousand spectators from the region.

== See also ==
- List of municipalities in Rio Grande do Sul
