= Davi Araújo =

Brazilian footballer (born 1999)

Personal information
- Full name: Davi Machado dos Santos Araújo
- Date of birth: 20 March 1999 (age 27)
- Place of birth: Paracatu, Brazil
- Height: 1.79 m (5 ft 10 in)
- Position: Left winger

Team information
- Current team: Ituano

Youth career
- América Mineiro

Senior career*
Years	Team	Apps	(Gls)
2017	Mamoré	3	(0)
2018–2019	Paracatu	15	(3)
2019–2022	Real Brasília	5	(2)
2020–2021	→ Botafogo (loan)	13	(0)
2022	→ Athletico Paranaense (loan)	12	(3)
2022–2023	Akritas Chlorakas	32	(0)
2023–	Real Brasília	0	(0)
2023–	→ Ituano (loan)	4	(0)
- * Club domestic league appearances and goals as of 11 November 2023

Davi Machado dos Santos Araújo (born 20 March 1999), known as Davi Araújo, is a Brazilian professional footballer who plays as a left winger for Ituano on loan from Real Brasília.

== Professional career ==
Born in Paracatu, Minas Gerais, Davi Araújo played for América Mineiro as a youth before making his senior debut with Mamoré in 2017, in the Campeonato Mineiro Módulo II.

Davi Araújo moved to Paracatu for the 2018 season; rarely used in his first campaign, he became a regular starter in his second, being named the Best Newcomer of the 2019 Campeonato Brasiliense. Shortly after, he signed for Real Brasília. He initially made an impression with the under-20 team and was subsequently promoted to the main squad.

On 17 August 2020, Davi Araújo joined Série A side Botafogo on loan until December 2021. He made his top tier debut twelve days later, coming on as a late substitute for Pedro Raúl in a 2–0 home loss to Internacional.

== Career statistics ==
As of 31 October 2020

Club	Season	League			State League		Cup		Continental		Other		Total	
Club	Season	Division	Apps	Goals	Apps	Goals	Apps	Goals	Apps	Goals	Apps	Goals	Apps	Goals
Mamoré	2017	Mineiro Módulo II	—		3	0	—		—		—		3	0
Paracatu	2018	Brasiliense	—		1	0	—		—		—		1	0
Paracatu	2019	Brasiliense	—		14	3	—		—		—		14	3
Paracatu	Total		—		15	3	—		—		—		15	3
Real Brasília	2020	Brasiliense	—		5	2	—		—		—		5	2
Botafogo (loan)	2020	Série A	6	0	—		1	0	—		—		7	0
Career total			6	0	20	5	1	0	0	0	0	0	27	5
