= Jobson (footballer, born 1995) =

Brazilian footballer

Personal information
- Full name: Jobson Souza Santos
- Date of birth: 13 September 1995 (age 31)
- Place of birth: São Paulo, Brazil
- Height: 1.85 m (6 ft 1 in)
- Position: Defensive midfielder

Team information
- Current team: Al-Dhafra
- Number: 9

Youth career
- Santos
- Palmeiras

Senior career*
Years	Team	Apps	(Gls)
2015–2017	Palmeiras	1	(0)
2016	→ Santo André (loan)	2	(0)
2016–2017	→ Nacional-SP (loan)	19	(2)
2017–2018	Náutico	27	(2)
2018	→ Red Bull Brasil (loan)	0	(0)
2019	Red Bull Brasil	11	(2)
2019–2022	Santos	34	(2)
2022	→ Náutico (loan)	17	(1)
2023	Al-Kholood	17	(0)
2023–2024	Al-Arabi	31	(4)
2024–2025	Al-Jabalain	30	(5)
2025–	Al-Dhafra	2	(0)
- * Club domestic league appearances and goals as of 21:54, 10 January 2023 (UTC)

Jobson Souza Santos (born 13 September 1995), simply known as Jobson (Brazilian Portuguese: [ˈʒɔbson]), is a Brazilian professional footballer who plays as a defensive midfielder for UAE club Al-Dhafra.

== Club career ==
=== Palmeiras and loans ===
Born in São Paulo, Jobson finished his formation with Palmeiras. On 29 November 2015, he made his first team – and Série A – debut, coming on as a substitute for Agustín Allione in a 2–0 away loss against Coritiba.

On 2 March 2016, Jobson was loaned to Santo André until the end of the Campeonato Paulista Série A2. He subsequently served another loan stint at Nacional-SP before leaving the club.

=== Náutico ===
On 30 May 2017, Jobson agreed to a permanent deal with Náutico. He contributed with ten league appearances during the season's Série B, as his side suffered relegation.

On 9 May 2018, after scoring the winning goal of the Campeonato Pernambucano final against Central, Jobson extended his contract until April 2019.

=== Red Bull Brasil ===
On 10 September 2018, Jobson was loaned to Red Bull Brasil for the Copa Paulista. On 19 December, he signed a permanent deal after Red Bull activated his release clause.

Jobson impressed during the 2019 Campeonato Paulista, helping his side win the Troféu do Interior and attracting interest from various Série A clubs.

=== Santos ===
On 16 April 2019, Jobson joined Santos in the top tier on a five-year deal. He only made his debut for the club on 17 October, starting in a 2–1 home win against Ceará.

Jobson was rarely used by manager Jorge Sampaoli during his first year, but featured more regularly under Jesualdo Ferreira. He scored his first goal for Peixe on 3 March 2020, netting the equalizer in a 2–1 Copa Libertadores away win against Defensa y Justicia; it was also his debut match in the competition.

On 10 November 2020, it was announced that Jobson and a further six first team players tested positive for COVID-19. The following 18 January, he was sidelined for the remainder of the season after suffering a knee injury.

Jobson returned to action on 10 October 2021, replacing Camacho late into a 1–0 home win over Grêmio. After being left out of the main squad during the 2022 season, he returned to Náutico on loan on 6 July 2022.

On 10 January 2023, Santos announced the departure of Jobson on a mutual agreement.

=== Middle East ===
On 11 January 2023, Jobson signed for Saudi Arabian club Al-Kholood.

On 1 June 2023, Jobson joined rival club Al-Arabi.

On 23 July 2024, Jobson joined Al-Jabalain.

On 14 June 2025, Jobson joined UAE Pro League club Al-Dhafra.

== Career statistics ==
As of 10 January 2023

Club	Season	League			State League		Cup		Continental		Other		Total	
Club	Season	Division	Apps	Goals	Apps	Goals	Apps	Goals	Apps	Goals	Apps	Goals	Apps	Goals
Palmeiras	2015	Série A	1	0	—		—		—		—		1	0
Santo André (loan)	2016	Paulista A2	—		2	0	—		—		—		2	0
Nacional-SP (loan)	2016	Paulista A3	—		0	0	—		—		13 (Note: Appearance(s) in Copa Paulista)	0	13	0
Nacional-SP (loan)	2017	Paulista A3	—		19	2	—		—		—		19	2
Nacional-SP (loan)	Subtotal		—		19	2	—		—		13	0	32	2
Náutico	2017	Série B	10	0	—		—		—		—		10	0
Náutico	2018	Série C	13	1	4	1	2	0	—		5 (Note: Appearance(s) in Copa do Nordeste)	1	24	3
Náutico	Subtotal		23	1	4	1	2	0	—		5	1	34	3
Red Bull Brasil	2018	Paulista	—		0	0	—		—		5	0	5	0
Red Bull Brasil	2019	Paulista	—		11	2	—		—		—		11	2
Red Bull Brasil	Subtotal		—		11	2	—		—		5	0	16	2
Santos	2019	Série A	4	0	—		0	0	—		—		4	0
Santos	2020	Série A	19	2	8	0	2	0	7 (Note: Appearance(s) in Copa Libertadores)	1	—		36	3
Santos	2021	Série A	1	0	—		0	0	0	0	—		1	0
Santos	2022	Série A	0	0	2	0	1	0	—		—		3	0
Santos	Subtotal		24	2	10	0	3	0	7	1	—		44	3
Náutico (loan)	2022	Série B	17	1	—		—		—		—		17	1
Career total			45	4	46	5	5	0	7	1	23	1	146	11

== Honours ==
Santo André

- Campeonato Paulista Série A2: 2016

Nacional-SP

- Campeonato Paulista Série A3: 2017

Náutico

- Campeonato Pernambucano: 2018
