= Felipe Jonatan =

Brazilian footballer (born 1998)

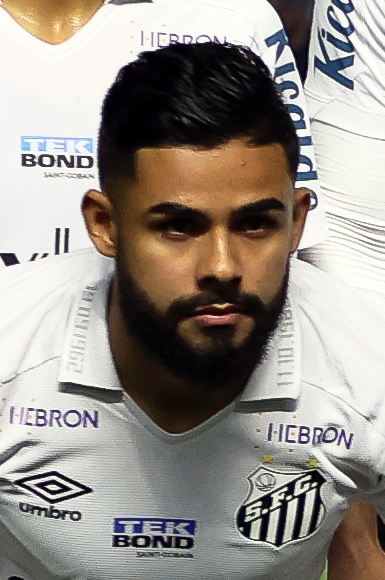
- Felipe Jonatan with Santos in 2022

Personal information
- Full name: Felipe Jonatan Rocha Andrade
- Date of birth: 15 February 1998 (age 28)
- Place of birth: Fortaleza, Brazil
- Height: 1.76 m (5 ft 9 in)
- Position: Left back

Team information
- Current team: Coritiba
- Number: 6

Youth career
- Fortaleza
- Bahia
- Ceará

Senior career*
Years	Team	Apps	(Gls)
2017–2019	Ceará	19	(0)
2019–2024	Santos	166	(4)
2024–2026	Fortaleza	23	(0)
2025–2026	→ Mirassol (loan)	7	(0)
2026–	Coritiba	5	(0)

International career^{‡}
2019	Brazil U23	2	(0)
- * Club domestic league appearances and goals as of 7 April 2026 ‡ National team caps and goals as of 13 October 2019

Felipe Jonathan Rocha Andrade (born 15 February 1998), known as Felipe Jonatan, is a Brazilian footballer who plays for Coritiba as left back.

== Club career ==
=== Ceará ===
Born in Fortaleza, Ceará, Felipe Jonatan joined Ceará's youth setup from Bahia. He made his senior debut on 22 August 2017, starting in a 2–0 home defeat of Tiradentes, for the year's Copa Fares Lopes.

Felipe Jonatan was promoted to the main squad for the 2018 season, and was initially a backup to Rafael Carioca and new signing João Lucas. After the arrival of Lisca as new manager, he became the club's first choice, making his debut in the Série A on 6 September by starting in a 2–1 home win against Corinthians.

On 31 October 2018, Felipe Jonatan renewed his contract until May 2022. He scored his first senior goal the following 6 February, netting the opener in a 1–1 away draw against Central, for the year's Copa do Brasil.

=== Santos ===
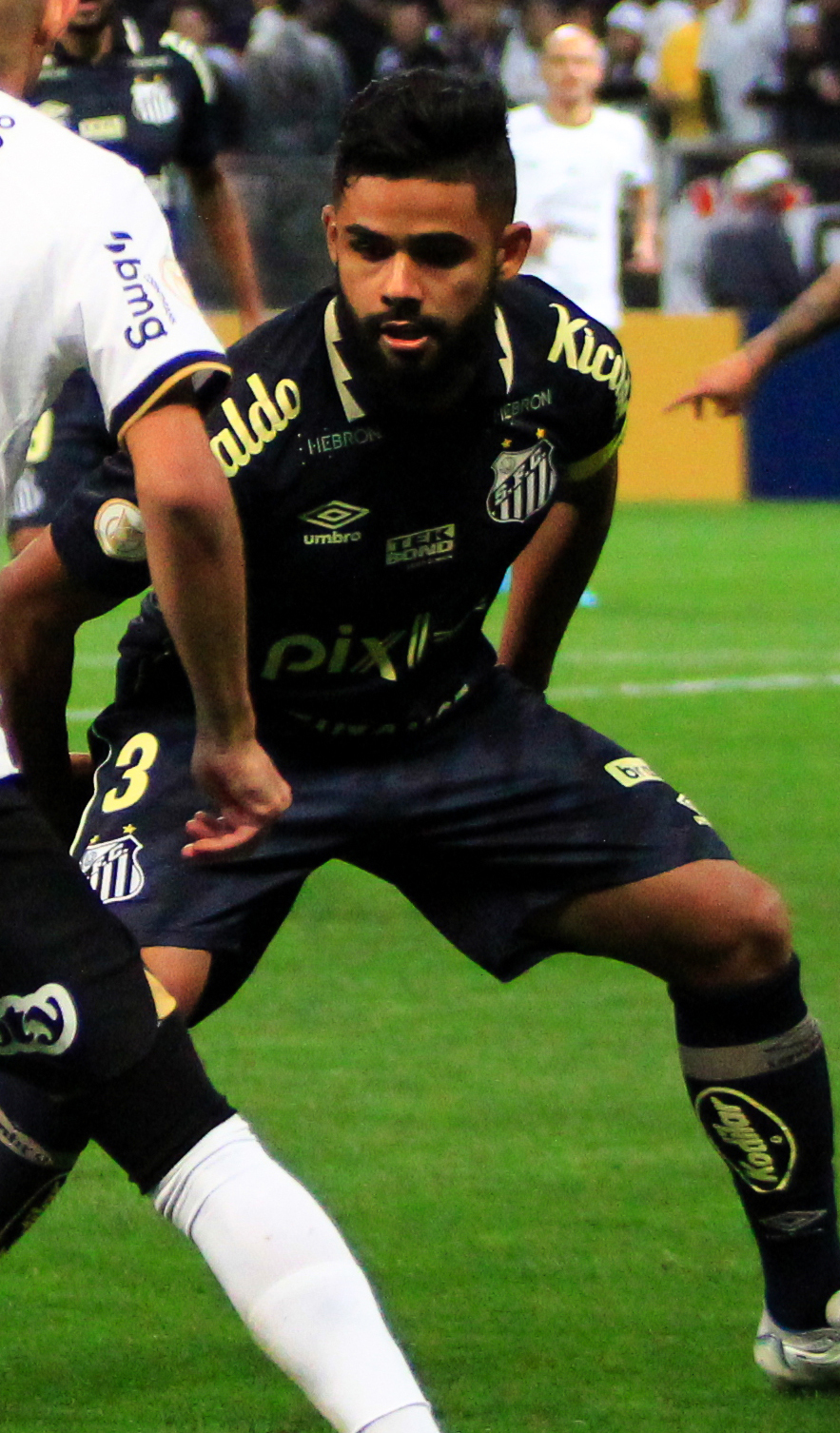
Felipe Jonatan with Santos in 2022

On 1 March 2019, Felipe Jonatan signed a five-year contract with Santos, for a rumoured fee of R$ 6 million. He made his debut for the club the following day, starting in a 3–2 home win against Oeste for the year's Campeonato Paulista.

Felipe Jonatan scored his first goal for Peixe on 28 April 2019, netting his team's second in a 2–1 away defeat of Grêmio. A backup to Jorge during the year, he became an undisputed starter in the 2020 season, after Jorge left.

On 20 April 2023, Felipe Jonatan suffered a knee injury in the early minutes of a 0–0 Copa Sudamericana home draw against Audax Italiano, being sidelined for the remainder of the year. He only returned for the 2024 season, with the club in the Série B, and was a regular starter during the 2024 Campeonato Paulista.

On 17 April 2024, Santos announced the termination of Felipe Jonatan's contract on a mutual agreement.

=== Fortaleza ===
On 17 April 2024, Felipe Jonatan returned to his hometown after signing for Fortaleza, a club he already represented as a youth, until April 2027.

== International career ==
On 20 September 2019, Felipe Jonatan was called up to the Brazil national under-23 team for friendlies against Venezuela and Japan. He played in both matches.

== Career statistics ==
As of 9 April 2024

Club	Season	League			State League		Cup		Continental		Other		Total	
Club	Season	Division	Apps	Goals	Apps	Goals	Apps	Goals	Apps	Goals	Apps	Goals	Apps	Goals
Ceará	2017	Série B	0	0	0	0	0	0	—		5 (Note: Appearance(s) in Copa Fares Lopes)	0	5	0
Ceará	2018	Série A	14	0	5	0	0	0	—		1 (Note: Appearance(s) in Copa do Nordeste)	0	20	0
Ceará	2019	Série A	0	0	0	0	1	1	—		3	0	4	1
Ceará	Subtotal		14	0	5	0	1	1	—		9	0	29	1
Santos	2019	Série A	26	2	7	0	—		—		—		33	2
Santos	2020	Série A	33	2	13	0	2	0	13 (Note: Appearance(s) in Copa Libertadores)	0	—		61	2
Santos	2021	Série A	33	0	6	0	6	0	13 (Note: Ten appearances in Copa Libertadores, three appearances in Copa Sudamericana)	2	—		58	2
Santos	2022	Série A	26	0	4	0	3	0	3 (Note: Appearance(s) in Copa Sudamericana)	0	—		36	0
Santos	2023	Série A	1	0	3	0	3	0	2	0	—		9	0
Santos	2024	Série B	0	0	14	0	—		—		—		14	0
Santos	Subtotal		119	4	47	0	14	0	31	2	—		211	6
Fortaleza	2024	Série A	0	0	—		0	0	0	0	—		0	0
Career total			133	4	52	0	15	1	31	2	9	0	240	7
