= 2023 Santos FC season =

Santos
2023 season
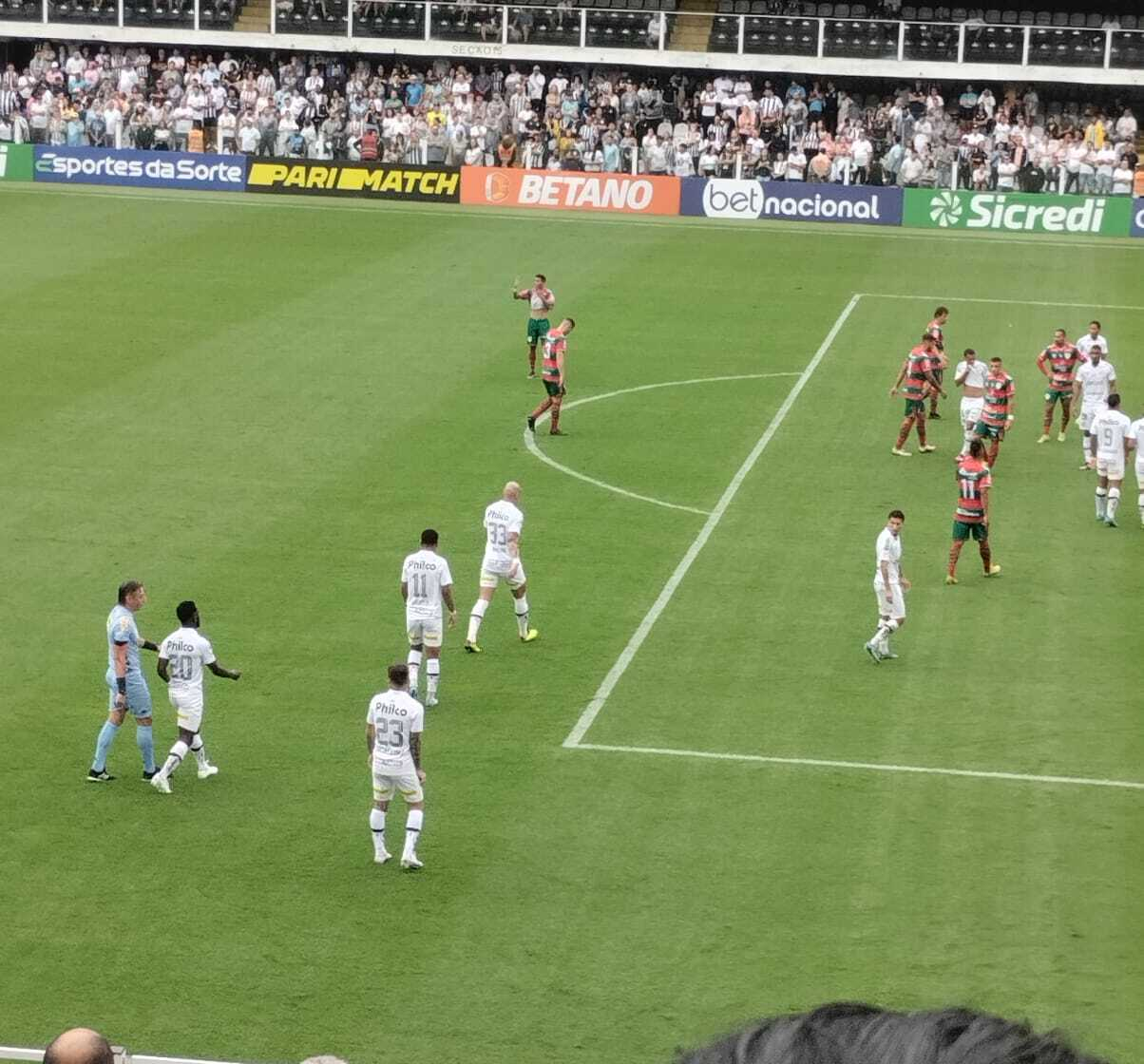
- Santos vs Portuguesa at the Vila Belmiro on 19 February
- President: Andrés Rueda
- Coach: Odair Hellmann (until 22 June); Claudiomiro (caretaker, 22 June – 25 June); Paulo Turra (from 23 June – until 6 August 2023); Diego Aguirre (from 6 August 2023 – until 15 September 2023); Marcelo Fernandes (caretaker, since 15 September 2023)
- Stadium: Vila Belmiro
- Campeonato Brasileiro: 17th
- Campeonato Paulista: Group stage
- Copa do Brasil: Round of 16
- Copa Sudamericana: Group stage
- Top goalscorer: League: Marcos Leonardo (13); All: Marcos Leonardo (21)
Home colours	Away colours	Third colours

The 2023 season was Santos FC's 111th season in existence and the club's sixty-fourth consecutive season in the top flight of Brazilian football. As well as the Campeonato Brasileiro, the club competed in the Copa do Brasil, Copa Sudamericana and the Campeonato Paulista.

At the end of the season, the club were relegated to the Brazilian Série B for the first time in their history. Their relegation led riots to occur in Santos.

== Players ==
=== Squad information ===
N	Name	Pos.	Nat.	Place of Birth	Date of Birth (Age)	Caps	Goals	Signed from	Date signed	Fee	Contract End
Goalkeepers
1	Vladimir	GK	(Brazil)	Ipiaú (Bahia)	16 July 1989 (aged 34)	78	0	Avaí	28 December 2022	Free	31 December 2025
34	João Paulo	GK	(Brazil)	Dourados (Mato Grosso do Sul)	29 June 1995 (aged 28)	210	0	Youth System	26 February 2014	Free	31 December 2027
42	Breno	GK	(Brazil)	Santos (São Paulo (state))	22 January 2001 (aged 22)	–	–	Youth System	14 December 2022	Free	31 October 2024
50	Paulo Mazoti	GK	(Brazil)	Ribeirão Pires (São Paulo (state))	11 July 2000 (aged 23)	–	–	Youth System	13 November 2020	Free	31 December 2024
52	Diógenes	GK	(Brazil)	Itapecerica da Serra (São Paulo (state))	6 January 2001 (aged 22)	–	–	Youth System	9 July 2021	Free	31 December 2024
Defenders
2	João Basso	CB	(Brazil)	Curitiba (Paraná (state))	13 January 1997 (aged 26)	14	0	Arouca (Portugal)	1 August 2023	Undisc.	31 December 2026
3	Felipe Jonatan	LB	(Brazil)	Fortaleza (Ceará)	15 February 1998 (aged 25)	197	6	Ceará	1 March 2019	R$ 6M	28 February 2025
12	Gabriel Inocêncio	RB/LB	(Brazil)	São Paulo (São Paulo (state))	20 August 1994 (aged 29)	25	0	Água Santa	12 April 2023	Loan	31 December 2023
13	João Lucas	RB	(Brazil)	Belo Horizonte (Minas Gerais)	9 March 1998 (aged 25)	28	0	Cuiabá	9 December 2022	R$ 6M	31 December 2025
16	Dodô	LB	(Brazil)	Campinas (São Paulo (state))	6 February 1992 (aged 31)	69	1	Atlético Mineiro	10 July 2023	Free	31 December 2025
24	Messias	CB	(Brazil)	São Mateus (Espírito Santo)	3 November 1994 (aged 29)	43	3	Ceará	7 December 2022	Undisc.	31 December 2025
26	Leonardo Zabala	CB	(Bolivia)	Santa Cruz de la Sierra	23 May 2003 (aged 20)	–	–	Youth System	15 July 2022	Free	31 December 2025
28	Joaquim	CB	(Brazil)	Nova Era (Minas Gerais)	28 December 1998 (aged 24)	39	2	Cuiabá	8 February 2023	€ 3M	31 December 2026
31	Alex	CB	(Brazil)	Ribeirão Preto (São Paulo (state))	10 May 1999 (aged 24)	29	1	Fluminense	7 May 2019	Free	31 December 2024
32	Jair	CB	(Brazil)	Orlândia (São Paulo (state))	7 March 2005 (aged 17)	2	0	Youth System	26 January 2022	Free	15 June 2025
38	Kevyson	LB/AM	(Brazil)	Leopoldina (Minas Gerais)	29 March 2004 (aged 19)	18	0	Youth System	12 July 2022	Free	31 December 2026
40	Cadu	RB	(Brazil)	Matão (São Paulo (state))	21 February 2002 (aged 21)	2	0	Youth System	31 January 2023	Free	31 December 2024
80	Júnior Caiçara	RB	(Brazil)	Santos (São Paulo (state))	27 April 1989 (aged 34)	5	0	İstanbul Başakşehir (Turkey)	22 August 2023	Free	10 December 2023
Midfielders
5	Alison	DM	(Brazil)	Cubatão (São Paulo (state))	1 March 1993 (aged 30)	273	4	Free agent	9 February 2023	Free	31 December 2023
6	Sandry	DM/CM	(Brazil)	Itabuna (Bahia)	30 August 2002 (aged 21)	92	0	Youth System	18 January 2019	Free	31 May 2026
7	Nonato	CM/AM	(Brazil)	São Paulo (São Paulo (state))	3 March 1998 (aged 25)	14	1	Ludogorets (Bulgaria)	4 August 2023	Loan	31 July 2024
8	Jean Lucas	DM	(Brazil)	Rio de Janeiro (Rio de Janeiro (state))	22 June 1998 (aged 25)	42	0	Monaco (France)	18 July 2023	Undisc.	31 July 2027
14	Rodrigo Fernández	DM	(Uruguay)	Montevideo	3 January 1996 (aged 27)	83	2	Guaraní (Paraguay)	29 March 2022	R$ 6M	31 December 2025
19	Dodi	DM	(Brazil)	S. Antônio do Sudoeste (Paraná (state))	17 April 1996 (aged 27)	48	0	Kashiwa Reysol (Japan)	14 December 2022	Free	31 December 2025
23	Lucas Lima	AM	(Brazil)	Marília (São Paulo (state))	9 July 1990 (aged 33)	253	21	Free agent	7 February 2023	Free	30 April 2025
25	Tomás Rincón	DM	(Venezuela)	San Cristóbal	13 January 1988 (aged 35)	16	2	Free agent	15 August 2023	Free	31 December 2024
29	Camacho	DM	(Brazil)	Rio de Janeiro (Rio de Janeiro (state))	2 March 1990 (aged 33)	100	2	Corinthians	15 June 2021	Free	31 December 2023
35	João Victor Balão	DM	(Brazil)	São Luís (Maranhão)	7 January 2003 (aged 20)	–	–	Youth System	31 January 2023	Free	31 December 2025
37	Ed Carlos	AM	(Brazil)	São Paulo (São Paulo (state))	19 March 2001 (aged 22)	13	0	Youth System	19 July 2022	Free	30 June 2026
47	Miguel Terceros	AM	(Bolivia)	Santa Cruz de la Sierra	25 April 2004 (aged 19)	9	0	Youth System	20 July 2022	Free	31 July 2027
97	Luan Dias	AM	(Brazil)	Santos (São Paulo (state))	31 July 1997 (aged 26)	8	0	Água Santa	12 April 2023	Loan	31 December 2023
Forwards
9	Marcos Leonardo	ST	(Brazil)	Itapetinga (Bahia)	3 May 2003 (aged 20)	167	54	Youth System	21 July 2020	Free	31 December 2026
10	Yeferson Soteldo	LW/AM	(Venezuela)	Acarigua	30 June 1997 (aged 26)	144	21	Tigres (Mexico)	12 July 2023	$ 4M	30 June 2027
11	Julio Furch	ST	(Argentina)	Winifreda	29 July 1989 (aged 34)	22	3	Atlas (Mexico)	24 July 2023	Free	31 December 2025
17	Maximiliano Silvera	SS	(Uruguay)	Pando	5 September 1997 (aged 26)	12	1	Free agent	6 September 2023	Free	31 December 2023
20	Stiven Mendoza	LW	(Colombia)	Palmira	27 June 1992 (aged 31)	44	10	Ceará	8 December 2022	Undisc.	31 December 2025
22	Alfredo Morelos	SS	(Colombia)	Cereté	21 June 1996 (aged 27)	3	0	Free agent	7 September 2023	Free	31 August 2025
30	Lucas Braga	LW	(Brazil)	São Paulo (São Paulo (state))	10 November 1996 (aged 27)	198	18	Luverdense	5 June 2019	Free	30 April 2026
88	Bruno Mezenga	ST	(Brazil)	Niterói (Rio de Janeiro (state))	8 August 1988 (aged 35)	11	1	Água Santa	12 April 2023	Loan	31 December 2023

Source: SantosFC.com.br (for appearances and goals), Wikipedia players' articles (for international appearances and goals), FPF (for contracts). Players in italic were not registered for the Campeonato Paulista.

=== Copa Sudamericana squad ===
- Players in ~~strike~~ are no longer in the squad
- Players in italic were included in the last submission

Note: Flags indicate national team as defined under FIFA eligibility rules; some limited exceptions apply. Players may hold more than one non-FIFA nationality.

No.	Pos.	Nation	Player
1	GK	BRA	Vladimir
2	DF	BRA	Luiz Felipe
3	DF	BRA	Felipe Jonatan
4	DF	BRA	Eduardo Bauermann
5	MF	BRA	Alison
6	MF	BRA	Sandry
7	MF	COL	Daniel Ruiz
8	MF	ARG	~~Gabriel Carabajal~~
9	FW	BRA	Marcos Leonardo
10	FW	VEN	Yeferson Soteldo
11	FW	BRA	Ângelo Gabriel
13	DF	BRA	João Lucas
14	MF	URU	Rodrigo Fernández
15	MF	BRA	Ivonei
17	MF	BRA	Vinicius Balieiro
19	MF	BRA	Dodi
20	FW	VEN	Stiven Mendoza
21	MF	BRA	Lucas Barbosa
22	DF	BRA	Nathan
23	MF	BRA	Lucas Lima
24	DF	BRA	Messias
26	DF	BOL	Leonardo Zabala

No.	Pos.	Nation	Player
27	DF	BRA	Pedrinho Scaramussa
28	DF	BRA	Joaquim
29	MF	BRA	Camacho
30	FW	BRA	Lucas Braga
31	DF	BRA	Alex
32	DF	BRA	Jair
33	DF	BRA	Maicon
34	GK	BRA	João Paulo
35	MF	BRA	João Victor Balão
36	FW	BRA	Deivid Washington
37	MF	BRA	Ed Carlos
38	DF	BRA	Kevyson
39	DF	BRA	Thiago Balieiro
40	DF	BRA	Cadu
41	FW	BRA	Fernandinho
42	GK	BRA	Breno Sossai
43	FW	BRA	Weslley Patati
44	DF	BRA	Lucas Pires
45	MF	BRA	Kevin Malthus
47	FW	BOL	Miguel Terceros
50	GK	BRA	Paulo Mazoti
52	GK	BRA	Diógenes

Source: Diário do Peixe

=== Appearances and goals ===
No.	Pos.	Nat	Name	Campeonato Brasileiro		Campeonato Paulista		Copa do Brasil		Copa Sudamericana		Total	
No.	Pos.	Nat	Name	Apps	Goals	Apps	Goals	Apps	Goals	Apps	Goals	Apps	Goals
34	GK	(Brazil)	João Paulo	36	0	12	0	6	0	5	0	59	0
1	GK	(Brazil)	Vladimir	2+1	0	0+1	0	0	0	1	0	5	0
4	DF	(Brazil)	Eduardo Bauermann	3	1	8+3	1	3	0	3	1	20	3
3	DF	(Brazil)	Felipe Jonatan	1	0	3	0	3	0	2	0	9	0
13	DF	(Brazil)	João Lucas	9+6	0	10+1	0	2+1	0	1	0	30	0
16	DF	(Brazil)	Dodô	18	0	0	0	0	0	0	0	18	0
28	DF	(Brazil)	Joaquim	31	2	4	0	3	1	1	0	39	3
44	DF	(Brazil)	Lucas Pires	7+2	0	9+1	0	3+1	0	3+1	0	27	0
33	DF	(Brazil)	Maicon	0+1	0	9+1	0	1	0	0+2	0	14	0
24	DF	(Brazil)	Messias	26+2	2	4+1	0	5	1	5	0	43	3
22	DF	(Brazil)	Nathan Santos	7	0	2+7	0	2+2	0	4	0	24	0
12	DF	(Brazil)	Gabriel Inocêncio	12+10	0	0	0	2+1	0	0	0	25	0
2	DF	(Brazil)	Luiz Felipe	0+1	0	0	0	0	0	2	0	3	0
31	DF	(Brazil)	Alex	4+2	0	0	0	0	0	1	0	7	0
38	DF	(Brazil)	Kevyson	11+6	0	0	0	0	0	1	0	18	0
40	DF	(Brazil)	Cadu	0+1	0	0	0	0	0	1	0	2	0
2	DF	(Brazil)	João Basso	14	0	0	0	0	0	0	0	14	0
80	DF	(Brazil)	Júnior Caiçara	1+4	0	0	0	0	0	0	0	5	0
32	DF	(Brazil)	Jair	0+2	0	0	0	0	0	0	0	2	0
29	MF	(Brazil)	Camacho	4+7	0	1+2	0	1+3	0	3	1	21	1
7	MF	(Colombia)	Daniel Ruiz	2+7	0	0+3	0	1+2	0	3+1	0	19	0
7	MF	(Brazil)	Nonato	7+7	1	0	0	0	0	0	0	14	1
19	MF	(Brazil)	Dodi	20+8	0	11	0	6	0	4	0	49	0
8	MF	(Argentina)	Gabriel Carabajal	0	0	2+1	0	0+1	0	0	0	4	0
8	MF	(Brazil)	Jean Lucas	22	0	0	0	0	0	0	0	22	0
18	MF	(Brazil)	Gabriel Pirani	0	0	0+2	0	0	0	0	0	2	0
15	MF	(Brazil)	Ivonei	0+1	0	1+3	0	0+1	0	1+2	0	9	0
21	MF	(Brazil)	Lucas Barbosa	1+3	0	2+8	2	2+2	1	2+2	0	22	3
23	MF	(Brazil)	Lucas Lima	28+7	1	4	0	6	1	4+1	0	50	2
25	MF	(Venezuela)	Tomás Rincón	14+2	2	0	0	0	0	0	0	16	2
47	MF	(Bolivia)	Miguel Terceros	0+2	0	0	0	0+2	0	1+2	0	7	0
14	MF	(Uruguay)	Rodrigo Fernández	24+6	1	4+1	0	5+1	0	3+1	0	45	1
6	MF	(Brazil)	Sandry	2+3	0	8+1	0	0	0	1	0	15	0
17	MF	(Brazil)	Vinicius Balieiro	0+3	0	0+2	0	0+1	0	0	0	6	0
25	MF	(Brazil)	Vinicius Zanocelo	0	0	3	0	0	0	0	0	3	0
97	MF	(Brazil)	Luan Dias	1+7	0	0	0	0	0	0	0	8	0
5	MF	(Brazil)	Alisson	2+3	0	0	0	0	0	2	0	7	0
37	MF	(Brazil)	Ed Carlos	0+4	0	0	0	0+1	0	0+2	0	7	0
11	FW	(Brazil)	Ângelo	5+6	2	7+2	0	2+4	0	2+3	0	31	2
88	FW	(Brazil)	Bruno Mezenga	0+9	0	0	0	0+2	1	0	0	11	1
36	FW	(Brazil)	Deivid Washington	5+4	2	0	0	2+1	0	3+1	0	16	2
30	FW	(Brazil)	Lucas Braga	22+5	0	2+9	1	1+2	0	0+1	0	42	1
9	FW	(Brazil)	Marcos Leonardo	30+1	13	11	4	4	3	3	1	49	21
99	FW	(Brazil)	Raniel	0	0	0+2	0	0	0	0	0	2	0
12	FW	(Brazil)	Rwan Seco	0	0	1+6	1	0	0	0	0	7	1
20	FW	(Colombia)	Stiven Mendoza	20+7	6	10+1	4	4	0	2+2	0	46	10
10	FW	(Venezuela)	Yeferson Soteldo	17+5	1	4	0	2	0	2+2	0	32	1
43	FW	(Brazil)	Weslley Patati	0+9	0	0	0	0+1	0	0+2	0	12	0
11	FW	(Argentina)	Julio Furch	5+17	3	0	0	0	0	0	0	22	3
22	FW	(Colombia)	Alfredo Morelos	1+2	0	0	0	0	0	0	0	3	0
17	FW	(Uruguay)	Maximiliano Silvera	4+8	1	0	0	0	0	0	0	12	1

Source: Match reports in Competitive matches, Soccerway

=== Goalscorers ===
Ran	No.	Pos	Nat	Name	Brasileirão	Paulista	Copa do Brasil	Copa Sudamericana	Total
1	9	FW	(Brazil)	Marcos Leonardo	13	4	3	1	21
2	20	FW	(Colombia)	Mendoza	6	4	0	0	10
3	21	MF	(Brazil)	Lucas Barbosa	0	2	1	0	3
3	4	DF	(Brazil)	Eduardo Bauermann	1	1	0	1	3
3	28	DF	(Brazil)	Joaquim	2	0	1	0	3
3	11	FW	(Argentina)	Julio Furch	3	0	0	0	3
3	24	DF	(Brazil)	Messias	2	0	1	0	3
8	11	FW	(Brazil)	Ângelo	2	0	0	0	2
8	36	FW	(Brazil)	Deivid Washington	2	0	0	0	2
8	23	MF	(Brazil)	Lucas Lima	1	0	1	0	2
8	25	MF	(Venezuela)	Tomás Rincón	2	0	0	0	2
12	30	FW	(Brazil)	Lucas Braga	0	1	0	0	1
12	12	FW	(Brazil)	Rwan Seco	0	1	0	0	1
12	29	MF	(Brazil)	Camacho	0	0	0	1	1
12	88	FW	(Brazil)	Bruno Mezenga	0	0	1	0	1
12	14	MF	(Uruguay)	Rodrigo Fernández	1	0	0	0	1
12	10	FW	(Venezuela)	Yeferson Soteldo	1	0	0	0	1
12	14	FW	(Uruguay)	Maximiliano Silvera	1	0	0	0	1
12	7	MF	(Brazil)	Nonato	1	0	0	0	1
Own goals					1	1	0	0	1
Total					39	14	8	3	64

Source: Match reports in Competitive matches

=== Disciplinary record ===
N	Nat	Pos	Name	Brasileirão			Paulista			Copa do Brasil			Sudamericana			Total		
N	Nat	Pos	Name	Yellow card	(yellow card) (yellow-red card)	Red card	Yellow card	(yellow card) (yellow-red card)	Red card	Yellow card	(yellow card) (yellow-red card)	Red card	Yellow card	(yellow card) (yellow-red card)	Red card	Yellow card	(yellow card) (yellow-red card)	Red card
14	(Uruguay)	MF	Rodrigo Fernández	12	0	1	2	0	0	1	0	0	3	0	0	18	0	1
19	(Brazil)	MF	Dodi	10	0	0	3	0	0	1	0	0	2	0	0	15	0	0
28	(Brazil)	DF	Joaquim	6	0	0	2	0	0	0	0	0	0	1	0	7	1	0
22	(Brazil)	DF	Lucas Pires	1	0	0	1	0	1	1	0	0	1	0	0	4	0	1
29	(Brazil)	MF	Camacho	3	1	0	2	0	0	0	0	0	0	0	0	5	1	0
9	(Brazil)	FW	Marcos Leonardo	3	0	0	3	0	0	1	0	0	1	0	0	8	0	0
10	(Venezuela)	FW	Yeferson Soteldo	3	1	1	1	0	0	0	0	0	1	0	0	5	1	1
24	(Brazil)	DF	Messias	2	0	0	0	0	0	3	0	0	0	0	0	5	0	0
22	(Brazil)	DF	Nathan Santos	2	0	0	2	0	0	0	0	0	1	0	0	5	0	0
6	(Brazil)	MF	Sandry	2	0	0	3	0	0	0	0	0	0	0	0	5	0	0
13	(Brazil)	DF	João Lucas	1	0	0	1	0	1	0	0	0	0	0	0	2	0	1
23	(Brazil)	MF	Lucas Lima	5	0	1	0	0	0	1	0	0	1	0	0	7	0	1
4	(Brazil)	DF	Eduardo Bauermann	0	0	1	0	0	0	0	0	0	0	0	0	0	0	1
1	(Brazil)	GK	Vladimir	0	0	1	0	0	0	0	0	0	0	0	0	0	0	1
34	(Brazil)	GK	João Paulo	6	0	0	1	0	0	0	0	0	1	0	0	8	0	0
97	(Brazil)	FW	Luan Dias	3	0	0	0	0	0	0	0	0	0	0	0	3	0	0
30	(Brazil)	MF	Lucas Braga	2	1	0	1	0	0	1	0	0	0	0	0	4	1	0
36	(Brazil)	FW	Deivid Washington	2	0	0	0	0	0	0	0	0	0	0	0	2	0	0
3	(Brazil)	DF	Felipe Jonatan	0	0	0	1	0	0	0	0	0	1	0	0	2	0	0
12	(Brazil)	DF	Gabriel Inocêncio	3	0	0	0	0	0	0	0	0	0	0	0	3	0	0
21	(Brazil)	MF	Lucas Barbosa	0	0	0	2	0	0	0	0	0	0	0	0	2	0	0
24	(Colombia)	FW	Stiven Mendoza	4	0	0	0	0	0	1	0	0	0	0	0	5	0	0
31	(Brazil)	DF	Alex	1	0	0	0	0	0	0	0	0	1	0	0	2	0	0
11	(Brazil)	FW	Ângelo	1	0	0	0	0	0	0	0	0	0	0	0	1	0	0
88	(Brazil)	FW	Bruno Mezenga	1	0	0	0	0	0	0	0	0	0	0	0	1	0	0
40	(Brazil)	DF	Cadu	0	0	0	0	0	0	0	0	0	1	0	0	1	0	0
7	(Colombia)	MF	Daniel Ruiz	1	0	0	0	0	0	0	0	0	0	0	0	1	0	0
38	(Brazil)	DF	Kevyson	1	0	0	0	0	0	0	0	0	0	0	0	1	0	0
33	(Brazil)	DF	Maicon	0	0	0	1	0	0	0	0	0	0	0	0	1	0	0
25	(Brazil)	MF	Vinicius Zanocelo	0	0	0	1	0	0	0	0	0	0	0	0	1	0	0
8	(Brazil)	MF	Jean Lucas	4	0	0	0	0	0	0	0	0	0	0	0	4	0	0
16	(Brazil)	DF	Dodô	4	0	0	0	0	0	0	0	0	0	0	0	4	0	0
11	(Argentina)	FW	Julio Furch	1	0	0	0	0	0	0	0	0	0	0	0	1	0	0
30	(Brazil)	FW	Lucas Braga	1	0	0	0	0	0	0	0	0	0	0	0	1	0	0
25	(Venezuela)	MF	Tomás Rincón	5	0	0	0	0	0	0	0	0	0	0	0	5	0	0
2	(Brazil)	DF	João Basso	1	0	0	0	0	0	0	0	0	0	0	0	1	0	0
80	(Brazil)	DF	Júnior Caiçara	1	0	0	0	0	0	0	0	0	0	0	0	1	0	0
22	(Colombia)	FW	Alfredo Morelos	2	0	0	0	0	0	0	0	0	0	0	0	2	0	0
7	(Brazil)	MF	Nonato	3	0	0	0	0	0	0	0	0	0	0	0	3	0	0
TOTALS				97	3	5	27	0	2	10	0	0	14	1	0	148	4	7

Source: Match reports in Competitive matches, Soccerway (yellow card) = Number of bookings; (yellow card) (yellow-red card) = Number of sending offs after a second yellow card; (red card) = Number of sending offs by a direct red card.

=== Suspensions served ===
Date	Matches Missed	Player	Reason	Opponents Missed	Competition
6 July 2022	1	Rodrigo Fernández	(red card) vs Deportivo Táchira	Blooming (A)	Copa Sudamericana
9 February	1	Sandry	3x (yellow card)	São Paulo (A)	Campeonato Paulista
12 February	1	Lucas Pires	(red card) vs São Paulo	Santo André (A)	Campeonato Paulista
12 February	1	João Lucas	(red card) vs São Paulo	Santo André (A)	Campeonato Paulista
26 February	1	Marcos Leonardo	3x (yellow card)	Ituano (A)	Campeonato Paulista
16 April	1	Yeferson Soteldo	(red card) vs Grêmio	Atlético Mineiro (H)	Campeonato Brasileiro
26 April	1	Messias	3x (yellow card)	Bahia (H)	Copa do Brasil
29 April	1	Dodi	3x (yellow card)	Cruzeiro (A)	Campeonato Brasileiro
29 April	1	Eduardo Bauermann	(red card) vs América Mineiro	Cruzeiro (A)	Campeonato Brasileiro
6 May	1	Rodrigo Fernández	3x (yellow card)	Bahia (H)	Campeonato Brasileiro
24 May	1	Joaquim	(red card) vs Audax Italiano	Newell's Old Boys (H)	Copa Sudamericana
10 June	1	Camacho	(red card) vs Coritiba	Corinthians (H)	Campeonato Brasileiro
9 July	1	Rodrigo Fernández	3x (yellow card)	São Paulo (A)	Campeonato Brasileiro
9 July	1	Vladimir	(red card) vs Goiás	São Paulo (A)	Campeonato Brasileiro
5 August	1	Lucas Lima	3x (yellow card)	Fortaleza (A)	Campeonato Brasileiro
5 August	1	João Paulo	3x (yellow card)	Fortaleza (A)	Campeonato Brasileiro
5 August	1	Mendoza	3x (yellow card)	Fortaleza (A)	Campeonato Brasileiro
20 August	1	Joaquim	3x (yellow card)	Atlético Mineiro (A)	Campeonato Brasileiro
27 August	1	Dodi	3x (yellow card)	América Mineiro (A)	Campeonato Brasileiro
3 September	1	Yeferson Soteldo	(red card) vs América Mineiro	Cruzeiro (H)	Campeonato Brasileiro
14 September	1	Rodrigo Fernández	3x (yellow card)	Bahia (A)	Campeonato Brasileiro
1 October	1	Dodô	3x (yellow card)	Palmeiras (A)	Campeonato Brasileiro
1 October	1	Yeferson Soteldo	3x (yellow card)	Palmeiras (A)	Campeonato Brasileiro
1 October	1	Lucas Lima	(red card) vs Vasco	Palmeiras (A)	Campeonato Brasileiro
1 October	1	Rodrigo Fernández	(red card) vs Vasco	Palmeiras (A)	Campeonato Brasileiro
8 October	1	Camacho	3x (yellow card)	Red Bull Bragantino (H)	Campeonato Brasileiro
8 October	1	Tomás Rincón	3x (yellow card)	Red Bull Bragantino (H)	Campeonato Brasileiro
19 October	1	João Paulo	3x (yellow card)	Internacional (A)	Campeonato Brasileiro
29 October	1	Marcos Leonardo	3x (yellow card)	Flamengo (A)	Campeonato Brasileiro
1 November	1	Lucas Braga	(red card) vs Flamengo	Cuiabá (H)	Campeonato Brasileiro
6 November	1	Dodi	3x (yellow card)	Goiás (A)	Campeonato Brasileiro
26 November	1	Nonato	3x (yellow card)	Fluminense (H)	Campeonato Brasileiro
3 December	1	Rodrigo Fernández	3x (yellow card)	Fortaleza (H)	Campeonato Brasileiro
3 December	1	Joaquim	3x (yellow card)	Fortaleza (H)	Campeonato Brasileiro

Source: Match reports in Competitive matches

== Coaches ==
Name	Nat.	Place of Birth	Date of Birth (Age)	Signed from	Date signed	Role	G	W	D	L	%	Departure	Manner	Contract End
Odair Hellmann	(Brazil)	Salete (Santa Catarina (state))	22 January 1977 (age 49)	Free agent	16 November 2022	Permanent	34	11	12	11	32.35	22 June 2023	Sacked	31 December 2023
Claudiomiro	(Brazil)	Santana do Livramento (Rio Grande do Sul)	25 August 1971 (age 55)	Staff	23 June 2023	Interim	1	0	0	1	0.00	25 June 2023	Return (Note: Back to assistant role after the match)	—N/a
Paulo Turra	(Brazil)	Tuparendi (Rio Grande do Sul)	14 November 1973 (age 52)	Free agent	23 June 2023	Permanent	6	1	3	2	16.67	6 August 2023	Sacked	31 December 2023
Felipe Endres	(Brazil)	Porto Alegre (Rio Grande do Sul)	8 August 1981 (age 45)	Staff	16 July 2023	Interim (Note: Interim for the match against São Paulo as Turra was suspended)	1	0	0	1	0.00	16 July 2023	Return	—N/a
Diego Aguirre	(Uruguay)	Montevideo	13 September 1965 (age 61)	Free agent	6 August 2023	Permanent	5	1	0	4	20.00	15 September 2023	Sacked	31 December 2024
Marcelo Fernandes	(Brazil)	Santos (São Paulo (state))	20 April 1971 (age 55)	Staff	15 September 2023	Interim	15	6	4	5	40.00			—N/a

== Transfers ==
=== Transfers in ===
N.	Pos.	Name	Age	Moving from	Type	Fee	Source
24	CB	(Brazil) Messias	28	Ceará	Transfer	Undisclosed	
20	LW	(Colombia) Stiven Mendoza	30	Ceará	Transfer	Undisclosed	
13	RB	(Brazil) João Lucas	24	Cuiabá	Transfer	R$ 6M	
19	DM	(Brazil) Dodi	26	Kashiwa Reysol (Japan)	Transfer	Free	
1	GK	(Brazil) Vladimir	33	Avaí	Transfer	Free	
23	AM	(Brazil) Lucas Lima	32	Free agent	Transfer	Free	
28	CB	(Brazil) Joaquim	24	Cuiabá	Transfer	€ 3M	
5	DM	(Brazil) Alison	29	Free agent	Transfer	Free	
16	LB	(Brazil) Dodô	31	Atlético Mineiro	Transfer	Free	
8	DM	(Brazil) Jean Lucas	25	Monaco (France)	Transfer	Undisclosed	
11	ST	(Argentina) Julio Furch	33	Atlas (Mexico)	Transfer	Free	
2	CB	(Brazil) João Basso	26	Arouca (Portugal)	Transfer	Undisclosed	
25	DM	(Venezuela) Tomás Rincón	35	Free agent	Transfer	Free	
80	RB	(Brazil) Júnior Caiçara	34	İstanbul Başakşehir (Turkey)	Transfer	Free	
17	FW	(Uruguay) Maximiliano Silvera	25	Free agent	Transfer	Free	
22	FW	(Colombia) Alfredo Morelos	27	Free agent	Transfer	Free	

=== Loans in ===
N.	Pos.	Name	Age	Loaned from	Loan expires	Fee	Source
7	AM	(Colombia) Daniel Ruiz	21	Millonarios (Colombia)	December 2023	Undisclosed	
88	ST	(Brazil) Bruno Mezenga	34	Água Santa	December 2023	Undisclosed	
12	RB/LB	(Brazil) Gabriel Inocêncio	28	Água Santa	December 2023	Undisclosed	
97	AM	(Brazil) Luan Dias	25	Água Santa	December 2023	Undisclosed	
7	MF	(Brazil) Nonato	25	Ludogorets (Bulgaria)	July 2024	Undisclosed	

=== Transfers out ===
N.	Pos.	Name	Age	Moving to	Type	Fee	Source
20	AM	(Brazil) Luan	29	Corinthians	Loan return	Free	
40	AM	(Brazil) Bruno Oliveira	24	Caldense	Loan return	Free	
13	RB	(Brazil) Madson	30	Athletico Paranaense	Contract ended	Free	
27	RB	(Brazil) Auro	26	Toronto FC (Canada)	Loan ended	Free	
8	LW	(Ecuador) Jhojan Julio	24	LDU Quito (Ecuador)	Loan terminated	Free	
15	ST	(Ecuador) Bryan Angulo	27	Emelec (Ecuador)	Contract rescinded	Free	
—	CB	(Brazil) Wagner Leonardo	23	Portimonense (Portugal)	Contract rescinded	Free	
—	DM	(Brazil) Guilherme Nunes	24	Brasil de Pelotas	Contract rescinded	Free	
7	CM	(Uruguay) Pato Sánchez	38	Peñarol (Uruguay)	Contract rescinded	Free	
—	ST	(Brazil) Felippe Cardoso	24	Casa Pia (Portugal)	Contract rescinded	Free	
—	DM	(Brazil) Jobson	27	Al-Kholood (Saudi Arabia)	Contract rescinded	Free	
99	ST	(Brazil) Raniel	26	Free agent	Contract rescinded	Free	
33	CB	(Brazil) Maicon	34	Vasco da Gama	Contract rescinded	Free	
4	CB	(Brazil) Eduardo Bauermann	27	Alanyaspor (Turkey)	Contract rescinded	Free	
11	LW	(Brazil) Ângelo	18	Chelsea (England)	Transfer	€15M	
7	AM	(Colombia) Daniel Ruiz	22	Millonarios (Colombia)	Loan ended	Free	
11	ST	(Brazil) Deivid Washington	18	Chelsea (England)	Transfer	€16M	

=== Loans out ===
N.	P	Name	Age	Loaned to	Loan expires	Source
—	AM	(Brazil) Lucas Lourenço	21	Botafogo-SP	November 2023	
—	CB	(Brazil) Jhonnathan	21	ABC	November 2023	
22	GK	(Brazil) John	26	Internacional	December 2023	
—	FW	(Brazil) Tailson	23	Ferroviária	July 2023	
—	AM	(Brazil) Willian Maranhão	27	Ceará	November 2023	
—	FW	(Brazil) Allanzinho	22	Joinville	December 2023	
18	AM	(Brazil) Gabriel Pirani	20	Fluminense	December 2023	
25	MF	(Brazil) Vinicius Zanocelo	22	Fortaleza	December 2023	
12	FW	(Brazil) Rwan Seco	21	Vasco da Gama	December 2023	
8	MF	(Argentina) Gabriel Carabajal	31	Vasco da Gama	December 2023	
—	FW	(Brazil) Allanzinho	23	São Bernardo	November 2023	
—	FW	(Brazil) Tailson	24	Retrô	September 2023	
—	AM	(Brazil) Lucas Lourenço	22	Figueirense	November 2023	
15	MF	(Brazil) Ivonei	21	Botafogo-SP	December 2023	
18	AM	(Brazil) Gabriel Pirani	20	DC United (United States)	December 2023	
12	FW	(Brazil) Rwan Seco	21	Ludogorets (Bulgaria)	June 2024	
44	LB	(Brazil) Lucas Pires	22	Cádiz (Spain)	June 2024	
21	AM	(Brazil) Lucas Barbosa	22	Coritiba	December 2023	
2	CB	(Brazil) Luiz Felipe	29	Atlético Goianiense	December 2023	
17	DM	(Brazil) Vinicius Balieiro	24	Ituano	December 2023	
22	RB	(Brazil) Nathan Santos	21	Famalicão (Portugal)	June 2024	
—	FW	(Brazil) Bruno Marques	24	Marítimo (Portugal)	June 2024	
—	CB	(Brazil) Robson Reis	23	Paços de Ferreira (Portugal)	May 2024	
8	MF	(Argentina) Gabriel Carabajal	31	Puebla (Mexico)	December 2023	

== Competitions ==
=== Overview ===
Competition	First match	Last match	Starting round	Final position	Record							
Competition	First match	Last match	Starting round	Final position	Pld	W	D	L	GF	GA	GD	Win %
Série A	16 April 2023	6 December 2023	Matchday 1	17th	38	11	10	17	39	64	−25	28.95
Copa do Brasil	23 February 2023	31 May 2023	First round	Round of 16	6	4	2	0	8	1	+7	66.67
Campeonato Paulista	14 January 2023	5 March 2023	Matchday 1	Group stage	12	3	5	4	14	17	−3	25.00
Copa Sudamericana	4 April 2023	29 June 2023	Group stage	Group stage	6	1	2	3	3	5	−2	16.67
Total					62	19	19	24	64	87	−23	30.65

Source: Competitions

=== Campeonato Paulista ===
==== Results summary ====
Overall								Home						Away					
Pld	W	D	L	GF	GA	GD	Pts	W	D	L	GF	GA	GD	W	D	L	GF	GA	GD
12	3	5	4	14	17	−3	14	3	3	0	10	4	+6	0	2	4	4	13	−9

Source: Globo Esporte

==== Group stage ====
Pos	Team	Pld	W	D	L	GF	GA	GD	Pts	Qualification or relegation
1	Red Bull Bragantino	12	6	2	4	15	10	+5	20	Knockout stage
2	Botafogo	12	4	2	6	14	17	−3	14	Knockout stage
3	Santos	12	3	5	4	14	17	−3	14	
4	Internacional de Limeira	12	3	2	7	4	18	−14	11	

Source: Soccerway

==== Matches ====
14 January 1	Santos	2–1	Mirassol	Santos
18:30 UTC-03:00	Zanocelo (yellow card) 33'; Marcos Leonardo 43' (pen.), (penalty missed) 90+14'; Sandry (yellow card) 77'; Lucas Braga 90+5'	Report	27' Danielzinho; (yellow card) 54' Zé Mateus; (yellow card) 83' Kauan; (yellow card) 89' Yuri; (yellow card) 90+13' Reniê; (yellow card) 90+13' Arthur Henrique	Stadium: Vila Belmiro; Attendance: 13,152; Referee: Luiz Flávio de Oliveira

18 January 2	Guarani	2–0	Santos	Campinas
21:35 UTC-03:00	Giovanni Augusto 6' (pen.); Nicolas Careca 46'	Report	(yellow card) 4' João Paulo	Stadium: Estádio Brinco de Ouro; Attendance: 4,699; Referee: Raphael Claus

22 January 3	São Bernardo	1–1	Santos	São Bernardo do Campo
18:30 UTC-03:00	Matheus Salustiano (yellow card) 4'; Chrystian 8'; Alex Alves (yellow card) 51'; Vitinho (yellow card) 79'; Rodrigo Souza (yellow card) 90+4'	Report	(yellow card) 12' Fernández; (yellow card) 29' Sandry; (yellow card) 65' Lucas Pires; 90' (o.g.) Matheus Salustiano	Stadium: Estádio 1º de Maio; Attendance: 4,832; Referee: Salim Fende Chavez

25 January 4	Santos	0–0	Água Santa	Santos
21:35 UTC-03:00	Nathan Santos (yellow card) 45+5'; Lucas Barbosa (yellow card) 90+2'	Report	(yellow card) 20' Marcondes; (yellow card) 32' Igor Henrique; (yellow card) 58' Joílson; (yellow card) 74' Rodrigo Sam; (yellow card) 83' Bruno Mezenga; (yellow card) 90+4' Lelê	Stadium: Vila Belmiro; Attendance: 9,125; Referee: Edina Alves Batista

28 January 5	Santos	1–1	Ferroviária	São Paulo
18:30 UTC-03:00	Marcos Leonardo (yellow card) 45+3'; Mendoza 60'; Soteldo (yellow card) 81'	Report	(yellow card) 40' Léo Santos; 45+5', (yellow card) 45+6' John Kennedy; (yellow card) 52' Pablo; (yellow card) 53' Ronaldo Alves; (yellow card) 72' Rafael Costa; (yellow card) 90' Matheus Galdezani	Stadium: Estádio do Canindé; Attendance: 11,573; Referee: Flávio Rodrigues de Souza

4 February 6	Palmeiras	3–1	Santos	São Paulo
18:30 UTC-03:00	Murilo 22'; Rony 45+6'; Gabriel Menino (yellow card) 53'; Marcos Rocha (yellow card) 56'; Giovani 71'; Zé Rafael (yellow card) 77'	Report	(yellow card) 45+4' Dodi; (yellow card) 81' Camacho; 90+4' Bauermann	Stadium: Morumbi; Attendance: 49,241; Referee: Vinícius Gonçalves Dias Araújo

8 February 7	Santos	1–0	São Bento	Santos
21:35 UTC-03:00	João Lucas (yellow card) 14'; Sandry (yellow card) 21'; Lucas Braga (yellow card) 77'; Lucas Barbosa 85'; Marcos Leonardo (yellow card) 90'	Report	(yellow card) 29' Vitinho	Stadium: Vila Belmiro; Attendance: 6,539; Referee: Raphael Claus

12 February 8	São Paulo	3–1	Santos	São Paulo
18:30 UTC-03:00	Luciano (yellow card) 10'; Calleri 16', (yellow card) 72'; Galoppo 24' (pen.); Belém (yellow card) 47'; Pablo Maia (yellow card) 50'; Luan 87'	Report	(yellow card) 14' Camacho; (red card) 20' Lucas Pires; (yellow card) 45+1' Nathan Santos; (red card) 55' João Lucas; 90+4' (pen.) Rwan	Stadium: Morumbi; Attendance: 42,311; Referee: Flávio Rodrigues de Souza

16 February 9	Santo André	1–1	Santos	Santo André
19:30 UTC-03:00	Gabriel Taliari (yellow card) 42'; Pablo Diogo 71'	Report	(yellow card) 4' Felipe Jonatan; (yellow card) 77' Joaquim Henrique; (yellow card) 82' Lucas Barbosa; 89' Mendoza	Stadium: Estádio Bruno José Daniel; Attendance: 4,745; Referee: Vinícius Gonçalves Dias Araújo

19 February 10	Santos	4–0	Portuguesa	Santos
16:00 UTC-03:00	Marcos Leonardo 2', 19'; Mendoza 32', 51'; Joaquim Henrique (yellow card) 44'	Report	(yellow card) 26' Fabiano; (red card) 38' Diogo Marzagão; (yellow card) 50' Tauã	Stadium: Vila Belmiro; Attendance: 10,588; Referee: Raphael Claus

26 February 11	Santos	2–2	Corinthians	Santos
16:00 UTC-03:00	Marcos Leonardo (yellow card) 26', (goal) 90' (pen.); Dodi (yellow card) 29'; Lucas Barbosa 45+6'; Rodrigo Fernández (yellow card) 54'; Maicon (yellow card) 90+5'	Report	32' Yuri Alberto; (yellow card) 50' Giuliano; 67' Róger Guedes	Stadium: Vila Belmiro; Attendance: 13,051; Referee: Edina Alves Batista

5 March 12	Ituano	3–0	Santos	Itu
16:00 UTC-03:00	Claudinho 19'; Marcelo Freitas (yellow card) 39'; Gabriel Barros 45+4'; André (yellow card) 55'; Quirino 68'	Report	(yellow card) 51' Dodi	Stadium: Estádio Novelli Júnior; Attendance: 8,581; Referee: Vinícius Gonçalves Dias Araújo

=== Copa Sudamericana ===
==== Group stage ====
Pos	Team	Pld	W	D	L	GF	GA	GD	Pts	Qualification
1	(Argentina) Newell's Old Boys	6	5	1	0	11	4	+7	16	Advance to round of 16
2	(Chile) Audax Italiano	6	3	2	1	7	4	+3	11	Advance to knockout round play-offs
3	(Brazil) Santos	6	1	2	3	3	5	−2	5	
4	(Bolivia) Blooming	6	0	1	5	3	11	−8	1	

Source: CONMEBOL

4 April 1	Blooming (Bolivia)	0–1	(Brazil) Santos	Santa Cruz de la Sierra, Bolivia
21:30 UTC−03:00	Uraezaña (red card) 58'; Arce (yellow card) 58'; Romero (yellow card) 90+11'	Report	(yellow card) 36' Felipe Jonatan; (yellow card) 75' Nathan; 90+8' Bauermann; (yellow card) 75' Marcos Leonardo	Stadium: Estadio Ramón Tahuichi Aguilera; Attendance: 13,709; Referee: Luis Quiroz (Ecuador)

20 April 2	Santos (Brazil)	0–0	(Chile) Audax Italiano	Santos, Brazil
19:00 UTC−03:00	Rodrigo Fernández (yellow card) 75'	Report	(yellow card) 47' Rojas; (yellow card) 60' Labrín; (yellow card) 83' Hachen	Stadium: Vila Belmiro; Attendance: 8,866; Referee: Andrés Rojas (Colombia)

2 May 3	Newell's Old Boys (Argentina)	1–0	(Brazil) Santos	Rosario, Argentina
21:30 UTC−03:00	Pittón (yellow card) 68'; Gómez 84'; Pérez (yellow card) 90+5'	Report	(yellow card) 72' Lucas Lima; (yellow card) 87' Lucas Pires; (yellow card) 90+2' Dodi; (yellow card) 90+5' Rodrigo Fernández	Stadium: Estadio Marcelo Bielsa; Attendance: 10,327; Referee: Alexis Herrera (Venezuela)

24 May 4	Audax Italiano (Chile)	2–1	(Brazil) Santos	Rancagua, Chile
21:00 UTC−03:00	Fernández (yellow card) 39'; Sosa (yellow card) 45', (goal) 45+5', 55'	Report	20' Camacho; (yellow card) 45+1' (yellow-red card) 45+2' Joaquim Henrique; (yellow card) 45+7' João Paulo	Stadium: Estadio El Teniente; Referee: Christian Ferreyra (Uruguay)

6 June 5	Santos (Brazil)	1–2	(Argentina) Newell's Old Boys	Santos, Brazil
21:00 UTC−03:00	Dodi (yellow card) 42'; Marcos Leonardo 80' (pen.)	Report	45+1' Sforza; (yellow card) 48' Sforza; (yellow card) 54' Pittón; (yellow card) 79' Mosquera; (yellow card) 89' Ferreira; (yellow card) 89' Aguirre; 90+8' Portillo	Stadium: Vila Belmiro; Attendance: 6,204; Referee: Jesús Valenzuela (Venezuela)

29 June 6	Santos (Brazil)	0–0	(Bolivia) Blooming	Santos, Brazil
19:00 UTC−03:00	Alex (yellow card) 36'; Cadu (yellow card) 45+1'; Rodrigo Fernández (yellow card) 72'; Soteldo (yellow card) 90+3'; Lucas Lima (penalty missed) 90+11'	Report	(yellow card) 23' Villamil; (yellow card) 45+3' (yellow-red card) 84' Latorre; (yellow card) 90+9' Romero; (yellow card) 90+11' Cabrera	Stadium: Vila Belmiro; Attendance: 2,891; Referee: Augusto Aragón (Ecuador)

=== Campeonato Brasileiro ===
==== Results summary ====
Overall								Home						Away					
Pld	W	D	L	GF	GA	GD	Pts	W	D	L	GF	GA	GD	W	D	L	GF	GA	GD
38	11	10	17	39	64	−25	43	6	7	6	26	28	−2	5	3	11	13	36	−23

Source: Soccerway

==== Results by round ====
Round	1	2	3	4	5	6	7	8	9	10	11	12	13	14	15	16	17	18	19	20	21	22	23	24	25	26	27	28	29	30	31	32	33	34	35	36	37	38
Ground	A	H	H	A	H	A	H	A	H	A	H	H	A	H	A	H	A	H	A	H	A	A	H	A	H	A	H	A	H	A	A	H	A	H	A	H	A	H
Result	L	D	W	L	W	W	D	L	D	D	L	L	L	W	L	D	L	D	L	W	L	L	L	W	W	W	L	L	W	D	W	D	W	D	D	L	L	L
Position	17	17	11	14	9	7	9	12	12	13	13	13	14	13	14	14	15	17	17	17	17	17	17	17	15	15	17	18	16	16	15	14	13	14	15	15	15	17

Source: Globo Esporte
P = Postponed

==== League table ====
Pos	Team	Pld	W	D	L	GF	GA	GD	Pts	Qualification or relegation
15	Vasco da Gama	38	12	9	17	41	51	−10	45	
16	Bahia	38	12	8	18	50	53	−3	44	
17	Santos (R)	38	11	10	17	39	64	−25	43	Relegation to Campeonato Brasileiro Série B
18	Goiás (R)	38	9	11	18	36	53	−17	38	Relegation to Campeonato Brasileiro Série B
19	Coritiba (R)	38	8	6	24	41	73	−32	30	Relegation to Campeonato Brasileiro Série B

Source: CBF
Rules for classification: 1) points; 2) wins; 3) goal difference; 4) goals scored; 5) head-to-head results (only between two teams); 6) fewest red cards; 7) fewest yellow cards; 8) drawing of lots.
(R) Relegated

==== Matches ====
16 April 1	Grêmio	1–0	Santos	Caxias do Sul
18:30 UTC-03:00	Vina (yellow card) 30'; João Pedro 44'; Luis Suárez (penalty missed) 54'; Kannemann (yellow card) 80'; Darlan (yellow card) 83'	Report	(yellow card) 32' Camacho; (yellow card) 51' Dodi; (yellow card) 83' (yellow-red card) 87' Soteldo	Stadium: Estádio Alfredo Jaconi; Attendance: 13,997; Referee: Wilton Pereira Sampaio

23 April 2	Santos	0–0	Atlético Mineiro	Santos
16:00 UTC-03:00	Dodi (yellow card) 44'; Rodrigo Fernández (yellow card) 76'; Luan Dias (yellow card) 90+4'	Report	(yellow card) 18' Hyoran; (yellow card) 88' Otávio; (yellow card) 90+3' Mariano	Stadium: Vila Belmiro; Attendance: 11,233; Referee: Bráulio da Silva Machado

29 April 3	Santos	3–2	América Mineiro	Santos
18:30 UTC-03:00	Mendoza 19'; Dodi (yellow card) 27'; Nathan Santos (yellow card) 32'; Bauermann 40', (red card) 90+3'; Rodrigo Fernández (yellow card) 45+4'; Marcos Leonardo 69' (pen.)	Report	7', (yellow card) 44' Alê; (yellow card) 28' Éder; 49', (yellow card) 72' Everaldo; (yellow card) 90+2' Iago Maidana	Stadium: Vila Belmiro; Attendance: 11,844; Referee: Anderson Daronco

6 May 4	Cruzeiro	2–1	Santos	Belo Horizonte
16:00 UTC-03:00	Wesley 21', 62'; Matheus Jussa (yellow card) 23'; William (yellow card) 45+2'; Ramiro (yellow card) 69'; Oliveira (yellow card) 80'; Richard (yellow card) 83'; Henrique Dourado (yellow card) 89'	Report	(yellow card) 38' Lucas Lima; 57' Ângelo; (yellow card) 64' Gabriel Inocêncio; (yellow card) 66' Rodrigo Fernández	Stadium: Independência; Attendance: 21,191; Referee: Bruno Arleu de Araújo

10 May 5	Santos	3–0	Bahia	Santos
19:00 UTC-03:00	Deivid Washington 4', (yellow card) 42'; Mendoza 14'; Lucas Braga (yellow card) 45+6'; Ângelo 51'; Lucas Lima (yellow card) 68'	Report	(yellow card) 3' Jhoanner Chávez; (yellow card) 25' Cicinho; (yellow card) 45+5' Nicolás Acevedo; (yellow card) 89' Kanu	Stadium: Vila Belmiro; Attendance: 7,262; Referee: Wagner do Nascimento Magalhães

14 May 6	Vasco	0–1	Santos	Rio de Janeiro
16:00 UTC-03:00	Erick Marcus (yellow card) 75'; José Luis Rodríguez (yellow card) 76'; Robson Bambu (yellow card) 78'; Léo Pelé (yellow card) 90+1'	Report	29' Deivid Washington; (yellow card) 72' Nathan Santos	Stadium: São Januário; Attendance: 19,108; Referee: Rodrigo José Pereira de Lima

20 May 7	Santos	0–0	Palmeiras	Santos
21:00 UTC-03:00	Ângelo (yellow card) 21'; Dodi (yellow card) 76'; Daniel Ruiz (yellow card) 88'	Report	(yellow card) 15' Raphael Veiga; (yellow card) 33' Mayke	Stadium: Vila Belmiro; Attendance: 12,641; Referee: Raphael Claus

28 May 8	Red Bull Bragantino	2–0	Santos	Bragança Paulista
18:30 UTC-03:00	Helinho (yellow card) 14'; Vitinho 31'; Matheus Fernandes (yellow card) 57'; Juninho Capixaba 75'	Report	(yellow card) 72' Deivid Washington	Stadium: Estádio Nabi Abi Chedid; Attendance: 5,988; Referee: Anderson Daronco

3 June 9	Santos	1–1	Internacional	Santos
21:00 UTC-03:00	Lucas Lima 12'; Joaquim (yellow card) 43'; Rodrigo Fernández (yellow card) 64'	Report	3' Luiz Adriano; (yellow card) 10' Johnny Cardoso; (yellow card) 45+4' Alan Patrick; (yellow card) 73' Jean Dias; (yellow card) 84' Nicolás Hernández	Stadium: Vila Belmiro; Attendance: 9,600; Referee: Paulo César Zanovelli da Silva

10 June 10	Coritiba	0–0	Santos	Curitiba
16:00 UTC-03:00	Thiago Dombroski (yellow card) 60'; Robson (yellow card) 70'; Victor Luis (yellow card) 90+7'	Report	(yellow card) 90' (yellow-red card) 90+2' Camacho	Stadium: Estádio Couto Pereira; Attendance: 25,512; Referee: Bruno Mota Correia

21 June 11	Santos	0–2	Corinthians	Santos
16:00 UTC-03:00	Rodrigo Fernández (yellow card) 45+6'; Dodi (yellow card) 70'	Report	19', (yellow card) 20' Yuri Alberto; (yellow card) 25' Matheus Bidu; 28' Ruan Oliveira; (yellow card) 30' Fagner; (yellow card) 45+3' Guilherme Biro	Stadium: Vila Belmiro; Attendance: 12,499; Referee: Leandro Vuaden

25 June 12	Santos	2–3	Flamengo	Santos
18:30 UTC-03:00	Lucas Pires (yellow card) 39'; Mendoza 40'; Rodrigo Fernández 52'; Luan Dias (yellow card) 90+5'	Report	22' Everton; 50' Éverton Ribeiro; (yellow card) 52', (goal) 57' Pulgar	Stadium: Vila Belmiro; Attendance: 0 Referee: Wilton Pereira Sampaio

2 July 13	Cuiabá	3–0	Santos	Cuiabá
18:30 UTC-03:00	Deyverson 53'; Denilson 75'; Rikelme 86'	Report	(yellow card) 34' Gabriel Inocêncio; (yellow card) 61' Messias	Stadium: Arena Pantanal; Attendance: 13,477; Referee: Bruno Mota Correia

9 July 14	Santos	4–3	Goiás	Santos
11:00 UTC-03:00	Marcos Leonardo 16', 30', (yellow card) 31'; Mendoza 45+1', 90+4' (pen.); Rodrigo Fernández (yellow card) 47'; João Paulo (yellow card) 51'; Vladimir (red card) 61'; Sandry (yellow card) 66'; Bruno Mezenga (yellow card) 79'; Luan Dias (yellow card) 90+13'	Report	40' (pen.), 61', (red card) 90+11' Guilherme; (yellow card) 68' Luís Oyama; 81' João Magno; (yellow card) 89' Matheusinho	Stadium: Vila Belmiro; Attendance: 0 Referee: Bruno Arleu de Araújo

16 July 15	São Paulo	4–1	Santos	São Paulo
16:00 UTC-03:00	Calleri 22' (pen.), 45+1'; Alisson (yellow card) 50'; David 79', (yellow card) 90'; Alexandre Pato 88'; Michel Araújo (yellow card) 90+2'	Report	(yellow card) 13' Messias; (yellow card) 24' Mendoza; (yellow card) 35' Sandry; (yellow card) 70' Joaquim; (yellow card) 86' Kevyson; 90+3' (pen.) Marcos Leonardo	Stadium: Morumbi; Attendance: 58,127; Referee: Bráulio da Silva Machado

23 July 16	Santos	2–2	Botafogo	Santos
16:00 UTC-03:00	Marcos Leonardo 24', 81'; João Lucas (yellow card) 63'; Jean Lucas (yellow card) 70'; Alex (yellow card) 90+1'	Report	(yellow card) 70', (goal) 87' Adryelson; (yellow card) 76' Marçal; 84' Tiquinho Soares; (yellow card) 89' Segovia	Stadium: Vila Belmiro; Attendance: 0 Referee: Ramon Abatti Abel

29 July 17	Fluminense	1–0	Santos	Rio de Janeiro
16:00 UTC-03:00	Nino (yellow card) 10'; Marlon (yellow card) 18'; André (yellow card) 20'; Leonardo Fernández (penalty missed) 27', (yellow card) 42'; Matheus Martinelli (yellow card) 75'; Cano 77', (yellow card) 87'	Report	(yellow card) 27' Mendoza; (yellow card) 45+5' Rodrigo Fernández; (yellow card) 47' Dodô; (yellow card) 87' João Paulo; (yellow card) 90' Lucas Braga; (yellow card) 90+3' Camacho	Stadium: Maracanã; Attendance: 34,211; Referee: Rodrigo José Pereira de Lima

5 August 18	Santos	1–1	Athletico Paranaense	Santos
16:00 UTC-03:00	Lucas Lima (yellow card) 74'; João Paulo (yellow card) 77'; Mendoza (yellow card) 88'; Marcos Leonardo 90+6' (pen.)	Report	30' Pablo; (yellow card) 89' Vitor Roque; (yellow card) 90+10' Vitor Bueno	Stadium: Vila Belmiro; Attendance: 0 Referee: André Luiz Skettino Policarpo Bento

13 August 19	Fortaleza	4–0	Santos	Fortaleza
18:30 UTC-03:00	Machuca 58'; Titi (yellow card) 41'; João Basso 80' (o.g.); Caio Alexandre 83'; Bruno Pacheco 90+1'	Report	(yellow card) 38' Rodrigo Fernández	Stadium: Arena Castelão; Attendance: 32,301; Referee: Bruno Mota Correia

20 August 20	Santos	2–1	Grêmio	Santos
16:00 UTC-03:00	Joaquim (yellow card) 16'; Marcos Leonardo 63', (yellow card) 64'; Soteldo (yellow card) 72'; Julio Furch 90', (yellow card) 90+1'; João Paulo (yellow card) 90+5'; Dodô (yellow card) 90+7'	Report	(yellow card) 16' (yellow-red card) 90+2' Reinaldo; (yellow card) 43' Fábio; 46' Cristaldo; (yellow card) 86' Rodrigo Ely; (yellow card) 90+4' Gustavo Martins; (yellow card) 90+5' Bruno Alves	Stadium: Vila Belmiro; Attendance: 12,933; Referee: Paulo César Zanovelli da Silva

27 August 21	Atlético Mineiro	2–0	Santos	Belo Horizonte
16:00 UTC-03:00	Paulinho 12', 67'; Otávio (yellow card) 38'; Battaglia (yellow card) 45+4'; Mariano (yellow card) 72'; Mauricio Lemos (yellow card) 90+7'; Hulk (yellow card) 90+9'	Report	(yellow card) 86' Lucas Braga; (yellow card) 90+2' Dodi	Stadium: Arena MRV; Attendance: 29,782; Referee: Rafael Rodrigo Klein

3 September 22	América Mineiro	2–0	Santos	Belo Horizonte
18:30 UTC-03:00	Rodrigo Varanda 29'; Juninho 55'; Javier Méndez (yellow card) 77'	Report	(yellow card) 50' Rincón; (yellow card) 57' Mendoza; (yellow card) 90+3' Jean Lucas; (yellow card) 90+4', (red card) 90+4' Soteldo	Stadium: Estádio Independência; Attendance: 3,654; Referee: Leandro Vuaden

14 September 23	Santos	0–3	Cruzeiro	Santos
19:00 UTC-03:00	Júnior Caiçara (yellow card) 36'; João Basso (yellow card) 50'; Rodrigo Fernández (yellow card) 79'	Report	(yellow card) 17' Marlon Xavier; 41' Matheus Jussa; (yellow card) 45+4' Luciano Castán; 70' Bruno Rodrigues; 89' Nikão	Stadium: Vila Belmiro; Attendance: 12,244; Referee: Bráulio da Silva Machado

18 September 24	Bahia	1–2	Santos	Salvador
20:00 UTC-03:00	Camilo Cándido 59'; Lucas Mugni (yellow card) 90+6'	Report	73' Marcos Leonardo; (yellow card) 88' Joaquim; 90+4' Julio Furch	Stadium: Arena Fonte Nova; Attendance: 41,431; Referee: Ramon Abatti Abel

1 October 25	Santos	4–1	Vasco	Santos
16:00 UTC-03:00	Marcos Leonardo 15' (pen.), 45+3'; Dodô (yellow card) 24'; Rincón 45+1', (yellow card) 45+6'; Soteldo (yellow card) 60', (goal) 75'; Lucas Lima (red card) 60'; João Paulo (yellow card) 61'; Rodrigo Fernández (red card) 61'; Dodi (yellow card) 90+8'	Report	31' Vegetti; (yellow card) 55' Sebastián Ferreira; (red card) 60' Medel	Stadium: Vila Belmiro; Attendance: 13,545; Referee: Anderson Daronco

8 October 26	Palmeiras	1–2	Santos	Barueri
16:00 UTC-03:00	Zé Rafael (yellow card) 14', (goal) 43'; Ríos (yellow card) 90+5'	Report	(yellow card) 41', (goal) 45+1' Rincón; (yellow card) 42' Morelos; 70' Marcos Leonardo; (yellow card) 73' Camacho	Stadium: Arena Barueri; Attendance: 17,049; Referee: Flávio Rodrigues de Souza

19 October 27	Santos	1–3	Red Bull Bragantino	Santos
20:00 UTC-03:00	João Paulo (yellow card) 27'; Jean Lucas (yellow card) 44'; Dodi (yellow card) 66'; Léo Ortiz 86' (o.g.); Nonato (yellow card) 90+6'	Report	9', 29' (pen.) Sasha; (yellow card) 45+4' Luan Patrick; 47' Eric Ramires	Stadium: Vila Belmiro; Attendance: 12,850; Referee: Raphael Claus

22 October 28	Internacional	7–1	Santos	Porto Alegre
16:00 UTC-03:00	Kevyson 1' (o.g.); Alan Patrick 14'; Valencia 27', 61'; Wanderson 39'; Renê (yellow card) 45+1'; Bustos 54'; Luiz Adriano 75'	Report	80' Maximiliano Silvera; (yellow card) 85' Nonato	Stadium: Estádio Beira-Rio; Attendance: 35,447; Referee: Paulo César Zanovelli da Silva

26 October 29	Santos	2–1	Coritiba	Santos
21:30 UTC-03:00	Joaquim 4', (yellow card) 42'; Marcos Leonardo 73'; Julio Furch (yellow card) 86'	Report	(yellow card) 8' (yellow-red card) 38' Willian Farias; 11' (pen.), (yellow card) 36' Robson; (yellow card) 60' Matheus Bianqui; (yellow card) 71' Fransérgio	Stadium: Vila Belmiro; Attendance: 12,205; Referee: Wagner do Nascimento Magalhães

29 October 30	Corinthians	1–1	Santos	São Paulo
18:30 UTC-03:00	Fausto Vera (yellow card) 35'; Jean Lucas 57' (o.g.); Moscardo (yellow card) 63'; Giuliano (yellow card) 67'; Fábio Santos (yellow card) 72'; Bruno Méndez (yellow card) 82'; Rojas (yellow card) 90+1'	Report	(yellow card) 28' Rincón; 90+9' (pen.) Mendoza; (yellow card) 90+10' Marcos Leonardo	Stadium: Neo Química Arena; Attendance: 42,248; Referee: Anderson Daronco

1 November 31	Flamengo	1–2	Santos	Brasília
20:00 UTC-03:00	Pedro 21'; Gerson (red card) 42'; Gabriel (yellow card) 50'; Bruno Henrique (yellow card) 90+5', (red card) 90+5'	Report	33' Nonato; (yellow card) 65' Rodrigo Fernández; (yellow card) 75' (yellow-red card) 90+1' Lucas Braga; 89' Joaquim	Stadium: Estádio Mané Garrincha; Attendance: 64,708; Referee: Rafael Rodrigo Klein

6 November 32	Santos	0–0	Cuiabá	Santos
20:00 UTC-03:00	Dodi (yellow card) 90'	Report	(yellow card) 31' Denilson; (yellow card) 86' Fernando Sobral	Stadium: Vila Belmiro; Attendance: 12,932; Referee: Sávio Pereira Sampaio

9 November 33	Goiás	0–1	Santos	Goiânia
19:00 UTC-03:00	Guilherme (yellow card) 25'; Matheus Babi (yellow card) 38'	Report	87' Julio Furch; (yellow card) 90+2' Lucas Lima	Stadium: Estádio da Serrinha; Attendance: 11,836; Referee: Paulo César Zanovelli da Silva

12 November 34	Santos	0–0	São Paulo	Santos
18:30 UTC-03:00		Report	(yellow card) 42' Wellington Rato; (yellow card) 61' Rafinha	Stadium: Vila Belmiro; Attendance: 13,442; Referee: Raphael Claus

26 November 35	Botafogo	1–1	Santos	Rio de Janeiro
16:00 UTC-03:00	Danilo Barbosa 11', (yellow card) 88'; Gabriel Pires (yellow card) 78'	Report	(yellow card) 24' Nonato; (yellow card) 59' Jean Lucas; 90' Messias; (yellow card) 90+4' Lucas Lima	Stadium: Estádio Nilton Santos; Attendance: 29,387; Referee: Wilton Pereira Sampaio

29 November 36	Santos	0–3	Fluminense	Santos
19:00 UTC-03:00	Dodi (yellow card) 14'; Rodrigo Fernández (yellow card) 45+2'	Report	10' Matheus Martinelli; 36' Jhon Arias; (yellow card) 44' Thiago Santos; 59', (yellow card) 85' Cano; (yellow card) 82' Guga	Stadium: Vila Belmiro; Attendance: 12,855; Referee: Anderson Daronco

3 December 37	Athletico Paranaense	3–0	Santos	Curitiba
18:30 UTC-03:00	Vitor Bueno 45+6'; Fernandinho (yellow card) 56'; Thiago Heleno (yellow card) 60'; Erick (yellow card) 65'; Madson 75'; Alex Santana (yellow card) 82'; Cacá (yellow card) 88'; Willian 90+3'	Report	(yellow card) 42' Rincón; (yellow card) 45' Joaquim; (yellow card) 83' Rodrigo Fernández; (yellow card) 90+10' Morelos	Stadium: Ligga Arena; Referee: Rafael Rodrigo Klein

6 December 38	Santos	1–2	Fortaleza	Santos
21:30 UTC-03:00	Dodô (yellow card) 3'; Gabriel Inocêncio (yellow card) 52'; Messias 58'	Report	(yellow card) 26' Pochettino; (yellow card) 35' Zé Welison; 39' Marinho; (yellow card) 40' Yago Pikachu; 90+6' Lucero	Stadium: Vila Belmiro; Attendance: 14,130; Referee: Leandro Vuaden

=== Copa do Brasil ===
==== First round ====
23 February Single match	Ceilândia	0–1	Santos	Taguatinga
20:00 UTC-03:00	Andrey (yellow card) 24'; Maycon (yellow card) 77'; Euller (yellow card) 87'	Report	(yellow card) 59' Marcos Leonardo; 74' Joaquim Henrique	Stadium: Serejão; Referee: Ramon Abatti Abel

==== Second round ====
9 March Single match	Santos	3–0	Iguatu	Santos
21:30 UTC-03:00	Lucas Barbosa 17'; Messias (yellow card) 25'; Marcos Leonardo 34', 77'; Dodi (yellow card) 37'	Report		Stadium: Vila Belmiro; Attendance: 0 Referee: Wilton Pereira Sampaio

==== Third round ====
11 April First leg	Botafogo-SP	0–2	Santos	Ribeirão Preto
19:00 UTC-03:00	Diogo Silva (yellow card) 36'; Fillipe Soutto (yellow card) 37'; Carlinhos (yellow card) 48'; Guilherme Madruga (yellow card) 54'; Tárik (yellow card) 90'	Report	15', (yellow card) 76' Lucas Lima; 38' (pen.) Marcos Leonardo; (yellow card) 45+2' Messias	Stadium: Estádio Santa Cruz; Attendance: 12,985; Referee: Bráulio da Silva Machado

26 April Second leg	Santos	1–0 (3–0 agg.)	Botafogo-SP	Santos
19:00 UTC-03:00	Messias (yellow card) 10', (goal) 51'; Lucas Pires (yellow card) 16'; Mendoza (yellow card) 22'	Report	(yellow card) 31' Carlinhos; (yellow card) 58' Tárik; (yellow card) 63' Carlos Manuel	Stadium: Vila Belmiro; Attendance: 1,788; Referee: Rodrigo José Pereira de Lima

==== Round of 16 ====
17 May Second leg	Santos	0–0	Bahia	Santos
19:00 UTC-03:00	Lucas Braga (yellow card) 85'	Report	(yellow card) 44' Everaldo; (yellow card) 80' Chávez; (yellow card) 89' Vitor Hugo	Stadium: Vila Belmiro; Attendance: 10,995; Referee: Sávio Pereira Sampaio

31 May First leg	Bahia	1–1 (1–1 agg.) (4–3 p)	Santos	Salvador
19:00 UTC-03:00	Acevedo (yellow card) 18'; Cauly 69'; Cicinho (yellow card) 75'; Kanu (yellow card) 90'	Report	(yellow card) 46' Rodrigo Fernández; 90+5' Bruno Mezenga	Stadium: Arena Fonte Nova; Attendance: 34,743; Referee: Bruno Arleu de Araújo
	Penalties
	Cauly (penalty scored); Mugni (penalty scored); Acevedo (penalty scored); Vitor Hugo (penalty scored); Ademir (penalty missed)		(penalty scored) Soteldo; (penalty scored) Mendoza; (penalty scored) Weslley Patati; (penalty missed) Camacho; (penalty missed) Bruno Mezenga

== See also ==
- 2023 Santos FC (women) season
