= Arthur Henrique =

Arthur Henrique may refer to:

- Arthur Henrique (footballer, born 1987), Brazilian football left-back for Gżira United
- Arthur Henrique (footballer, born 1994), Brazilian football left-back for Atlético Goianiense
- Arthur Henrique (footballer, born 1997), Brazilian football goalkeeper for CRB
- Arthur Henrique (politician) (born 1981), Brazilian politician
