= Luan Dias =

Brazilian footballer

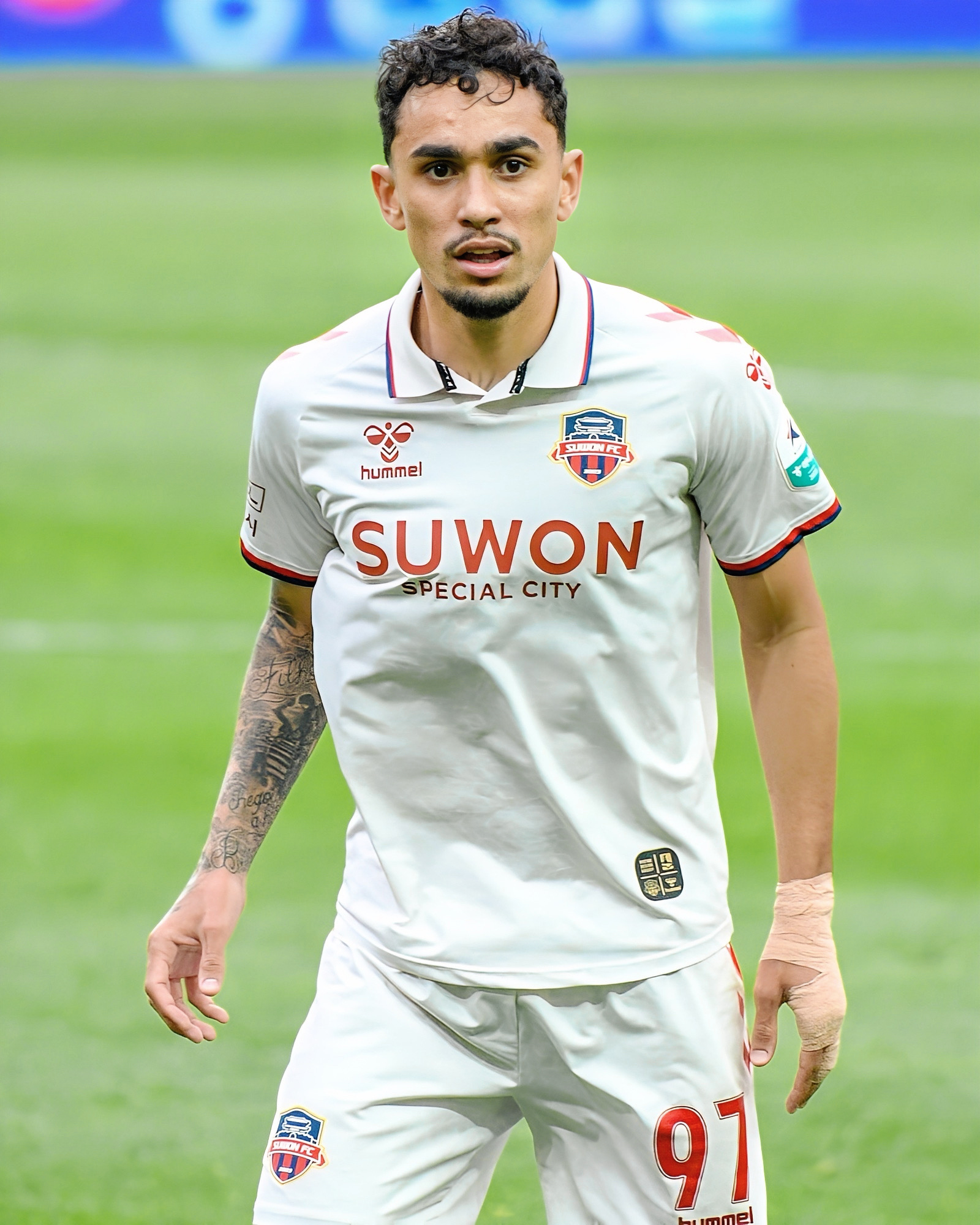
- Luan Dias with Suwon FC in 2025

Personal information
- Full name: Luan Dias da Silva
- Date of birth: 31 July 1997 (age 29)
- Place of birth: Santos, Brazil
- Height: 1.81 m (5 ft 11 in)
- Position: Attacking midfielder

Team information
- Current team: Gimpo FC
- Number: 10

Youth career
- 2016–2017: Água Santa

Senior career*
Years	Team	Apps	(Gls)
2017–2025	Água Santa	88	(7)
2020–2021	→ Ponte Preta (loan)	18	(0)
2021	→ Goiás (loan)	28	(4)
2022	→ Goiás (loan)	22	(0)
2023	→ Santos (loan)	8	(0)
2024	→ Guarani (loan)	28	(1)
2025	Suwon FC	35	(5)
2026–	Gimpo FC	12	(5)
- * Club domestic league appearances and goals as of 5 August 2026

Luan Dias da Silva (born 31 July 1997), known as Luan Dias, is a Brazilian footballer who plays as an attacking midfielder for South Korean club Gimpo FC.

== Club career ==
=== Água Santa ===
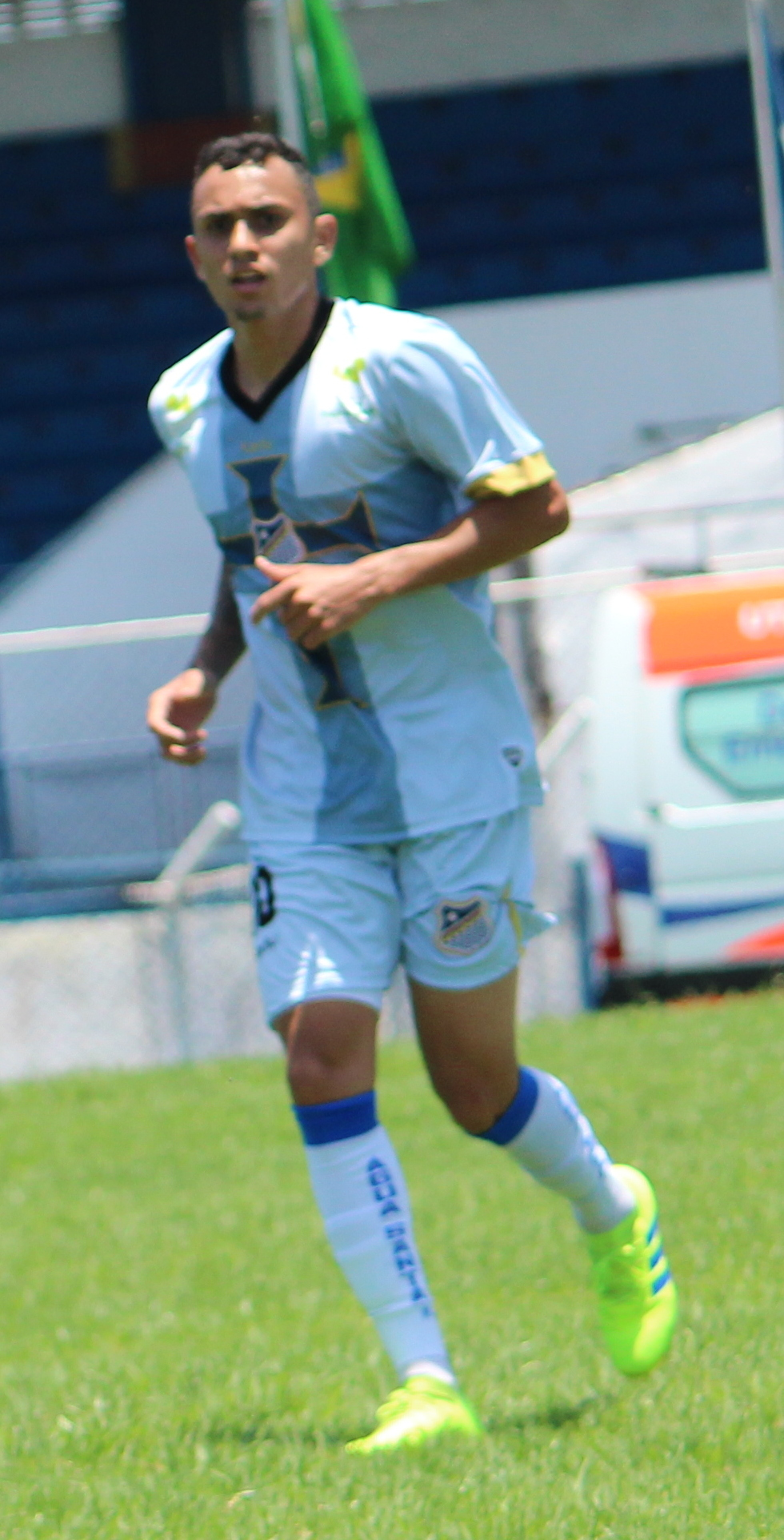
Luan Dias with Água Santa in 2019

Luan Dias was born in Santos, São Paulo, and finished his formation with Água Santa. He made his first team debut in 2017, becoming a regular starter afterwards and helping in the side's promotion from the Campeonato Paulista Série A2 in 2019.

On 13 July 2020, Luan Dias renewed his contract with the club until 2025.

==== Loan to Ponte Preta ====
On 6 August 2020, Luan Dias was loaned to Série B side Ponte Preta until the end of the season. He made his league debut against Avaí FC on 11 September 2020. He featured in 18 league matches as the club missed out promotion.

==== Loans to Goiás ====
Back to the Netuno in February 2021, Luan Dias moved to Goiás also in the second division on 2 June, also in a temporary deal. On 4 December, after helping in the latter's promotion to the Série A, it was announced that he would return to his parent club for the 2022 Campeonato Paulista, and subsequently rejoin Goiás on loan for the Série A.

After spending the first three months of the 2022 campaign nursing an injury, Luan Dias returned to Goiás and made his top tier debut on 28 May 2022, coming on as a late substitute for Elvis in a 1–1 home draw against Red Bull Bragantino.

==== Loan to Santos ====
After impressing during the 2023 Campeonato Paulista as Água Santa reached the finals, Luan Dias moved to Santos in the top tier on loan until the end of the year on 12 April 2023. He made his debut for the club eleven days later, replacing Daniel Ruiz in a 0–0 home draw against Atlético Mineiro and suffering a thigh injury during the match.

==== Loan to Guarani ====
Luan Dias made his league debut against Vila Nova on 23 April 2024. He scored his first league goal against Ponte Preta on 30 June 2024, scoring in the 25th minute.

== Career statistics ==
As of 2 June 2025

Club	Season	League			State League		Cup		Continental		Other		Total	
Club	Season	Division	Apps	Goals	Apps	Goals	Apps	Goals	Apps	Goals	Apps	Goals	Apps	Goals
Água Santa	2017	Paulista A2	—		0	0	—		—		16 (Note: Appearance(s) in Copa Paulista)	1	16	1
Água Santa	2018	Paulista A2	—		10	0	—		—		10	2	20	2
Água Santa	2019	Paulista A2	—		16	1	—		—		13	0	29	1
Água Santa	2020	Paulista	—		12	2	—		—		—		12	2
Água Santa	2021	Paulista A2	—		17	2	—		—		—		17	2
Água Santa	2022	Paulista	—		0	0	—		—		—		0	0
Água Santa	2023	Paulista	—		14	1	—		—		—		14	1
Água Santa	2024	Série D	—		11	0	2	3	—		—		13	3
Água Santa	2025	Série D	—		8	1	—		—		—		8	1
Água Santa	Total		—		88	7	2	3	—		39	3	129	13
Ponte Preta (loan)	2020	Série B	18	0	—		1	0	—		—		19	0
Goiás (loan)	2021	Série B	28	4	—		—		—		—		28	4
Goiás (loan)	2022	Série A	22	0	—		2	0	—		—		24	0
Santos (loan)	2023	Série A	8	0	—		0	0	—		—		8	0
Guarani (loan)	2024	Série B	28	1	—		—		—		—		28	1
Suwon FC	2025	K League 1	37	5	—		0	0	—		—		37	5
Gimpo FC	2026	K League 2	12	5	—		0	0	—		—		12	5
Career total			163	15	88	7	5	3	0	0	39	3	285	28

== Honours ==
=== Individual ===
- Campeonato Paulista Team of the year: 2023
