= Alex (footballer, born 1999) =

Brazilian footballer

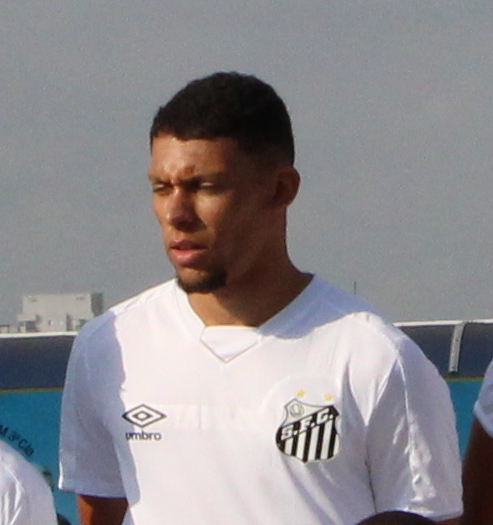
- Alex with Santos in 2019

Personal information
- Full name: Alex de Oliveira Nascimento
- Date of birth: 10 May 1999 (age 27)
- Place of birth: Ribeirão Preto, Brazil
- Height: 1.89 m (6 ft 2 in)
- Position: Centre back

Team information
- Current team: Al-Okhdood

Youth career
- 2013–2016: São Paulo
- 2016–2019: Fluminense
- 2019–2020: Santos

Senior career*
Years	Team	Apps	(Gls)
2018–2019	Fluminense	1	(0)
2020–2026	Santos	31	(1)
2021–2022	→ Famalicão (loan)	19	(0)
2025	→ Portuguesa (loan)	6	(0)
2025	→ Athletic-MG (loan)	9	(0)
2026–	Al-Okhdood	0	(0)
- * Club domestic league appearances and goals as of 17:45, 4 November 2025 (UTC)

Alex de Oliveira Nascimento (born 10 May 1999), simply known as Alex (Brazilian Portuguese: [ɐˈlɛks]), is a Brazilian footballer who plays as a central defender for Saudi club Al-Okhdood.

== Career ==
=== Fluminense ===
Born in Ribeirão Preto, São Paulo, Alex joined Fluminense's youth setup in June 2016, from São Paulo. On 17 January 2018, he appeared as an unused substitute in a 3–1 Campeonato Carioca away loss against Boavista.

Alex made his first team – and Série A – on 27 October 2018, replacing injured Frazan in a 3–0 loss at Santos.

=== Santos ===
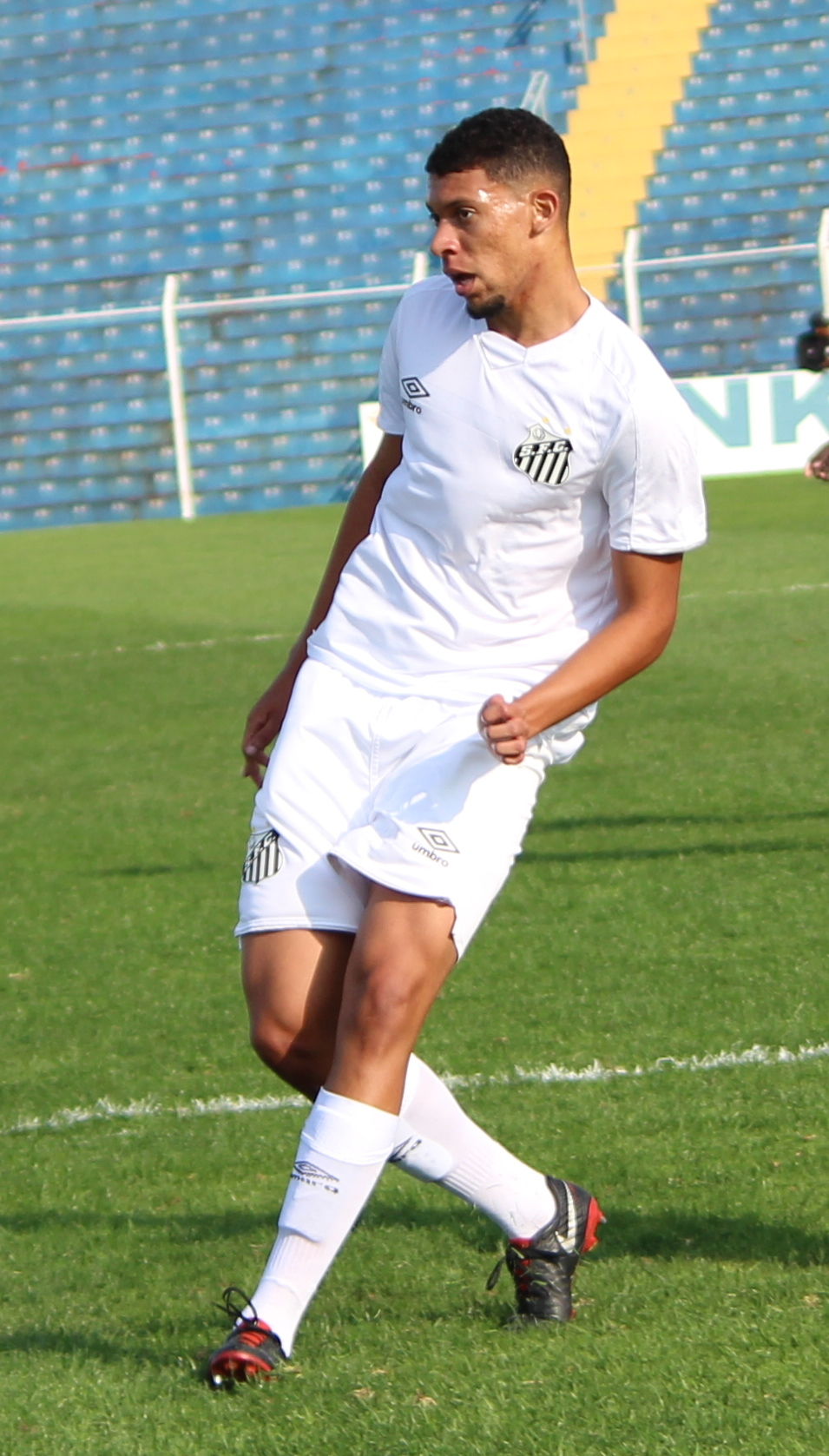
Alex with Santos in 2019

Alex joined Santos on 7 May 2019, initially assigned to the under-20 squad. Fluminense also retained 30% of the player's federative rights. On 30 July, after nearly three months at the club, he renewed his contract until December 2023.

On 22 January 2020, as both first team regulars Lucas Veríssimo and Felipe Aguilar were injured, Alex was included in Jesualdo Ferreira's 28-man squad for the 2020 Campeonato Paulista. On 1 July, he further extended his contract until 2024, and made his debut for the club on 16 August, replacing injured Veríssimo in a 3–1 home win against Athletico Paranaense.

Alex made his Copa Libertadores debut on 24 September 2020, again replacing Veríssimo in a 2–1 away defeat of Delfín SC. On 10 November, it was announced that he and a further six first team players tested positive for COVID-19.

==== Loan to Famalicão ====
On 17 August 2021, Alex moved abroad and joined Portuguese Primeira Liga side Famalicão on a one-year loan deal. He made his debut for the club on 28 August, replacing Pêpê late into a 1–1 home draw against Sporting CP.

==== Return from loan ====
Alex returned to Santos in July 2022, as Famalicão did not activate his buyout clause. An immediate backup to starters Maicon and Eduardo Bauermann, he scored his first goal for the club on 25 October, but in a 3–2 away loss against Flamengo.

In November 2022, Alex suffered a muscular injury which kept him out of the remaining matches of the season. It was later discovered as a parcial ligament injury, and he spent the first months of the 2023 campaign recovering.

On 13 June 2024, after being a backup option, Alex renewed his contract with Santos until December 2026.

==== Loans ====
On 19 December 2024, Portuguesa announced the loan of Alex for the 2025 Campeonato Paulista. Despite starting the year as a first-choice, he lost his starting spot and left the club in March 2025.

On 30 April 2025, Alex was announced at Série B side Athletic-MG on loan until the end of the season. On 7 July 2026, after spending the first half of the year separated from the first team squad at Santos, he was loaned to Ponte Preta in the second division, until the end of the season. The deal fell through roughly one month later, due to the club's transfer ban.

=== Al-Okhdood ===
On 19 August 2026, Alex agreed to a deal with Saudi club Al-Okhdood, after rescinding his contract with Santos.

== Career statistics ==
As of 4 November 2025

Club	Season	League			State League		Cup		Conmebol		Other		Total	
Club	Season	Division	Apps	Goals	Apps	Goals	Apps	Goals	Apps	Goals	Apps	Goals	Apps	Goals
Fluminense	2018	Série A	1	0	0	0	0	0	—		—		1	0
Santos	2020	Série A	11	0	0	0	0	0	2 (Note: Appearance(s) in Copa Libertadores)	0	—		13	0
Santos	2021	Série A	0	0	5	0	0	0	0	0	—		5	0
Santos	2022	Série A	4	1	—		—		—		—		4	1
Santos	2023	Série A	6	0	—		0	0	1 (Note: Appearance(s) in Copa Sudamericana)	0	—		7	0
Santos	2024	Série B	5	0	—		—		—		—		5	0
Santos	Total		26	1	5	0	0	0	3	0	—		34	1
Famalicão (loan)	2021–22	Primeira Liga	19	0	—		2	0	—		1 (Note: Appearance(s) in Taça da Liga)	0	22	0
Portuguesa (loan)	2025	Série D	0	0	6	0	0	0	—		—		6	0
Athletic-MG (loan)	2025	Série B	9	0	—		—		—		—		9	0
Ponte Preta (loan)	2026	Série B	0	0	—		—		—		—		0	0
Career total			55	1	11	0	2	0	3	0	1	0	72	1

== Honours ==
Santos

- Campeonato Brasileiro Série B: 2024
