= Ed Carlos =

Brazilian footballer (born 2001)

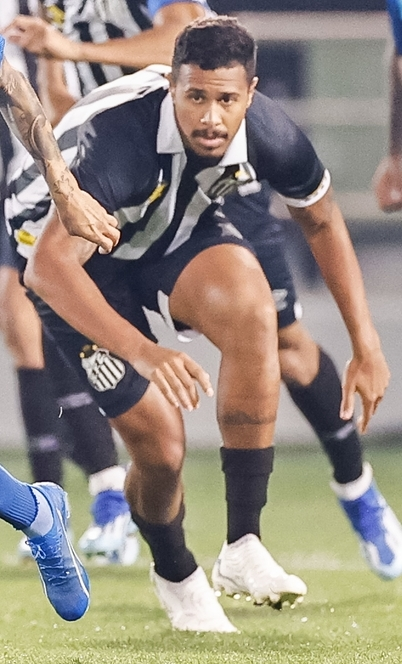
- Ed Carlos with Santos in 2024

Personal information
- Full name: Ed Carlos de Arruda Amorim
- Date of birth: 19 March 2001 (age 25)
- Place of birth: São Paulo, Brazil
- Height: 1.86 m (6 ft 1 in)
- Position: Attacking midfielder

Team information
- Current team: Botafogo-PB

Youth career
- 2013: Portuguesa
- 2014: São Caetano
- 2015–2021: São Paulo
- 2021–2022: Santos

Senior career*
Years	Team	Apps	(Gls)
2022–2025	Santos	10	(0)
2024	→ Betim (loan)	3	(0)
2024–2025	→ Niki Volos (loan)	21	(0)
2025	→ Botafogo-PB (loan)	0	(0)
2026–	Botafogo-PB	6	(0)
- * Club domestic league appearances and goals as of 21:22, 24 July 2026 (UTC)

Ed Carlos de Arruda Amorim (born 19 March 2001), known as Ed Carlos, is a Brazilian footballer who plays as an attacking midfielder for Botafogo-PB.

== Career ==
=== Early career ===
Born in São Paulo, Ed Carlos joined São Paulo's youth setup in 2015, after representing São Caetano and Portuguesa. In October 2018, he was named by English newspaper The Guardian as one of the best players born in 2001 worldwide.

On 30 June 2021, after nearly eight years at the club, he left as his contract expired.

=== Santos ===
On 3 August 2021, Ed Carlos signed for Santos, being initially assigned to the under-20 squad. Despite impressing in the 2022 Copa São Paulo de Futebol Júnior, he trained separately until being involved with the main squad only in July 2022 by interim manager Marcelo Fernandes.

Ed Carlos made his first team – and Série A – on 1 October 2022, coming on as a late substitute for Carlos Sánchez in a 1–0 away loss against Internacional. Late in the month, after being a starter in the previous matches, he suffered a shoulder injury which kept him out for the remainder of the season.

On 14 February 2023, Ed Carlos renewed his contract with Santos until June 2026. On 4 July, he was separated from the first team squad by head coach Paulo Turra, but returned to first team trainings on 8 August, after Turra was sacked.

==== Loan to Betim ====
On 19 April 2024, after spending the first months of the season separated from the first team squad, Ed Carlos was loaned to Betim for the year's Campeonato Mineiro Módulo II. He only featured in three matches, all as a substitute, as the club achieved promotion as champions.

==== Loan to Niki Volos ====
On 20 September 2024, Ed Carlos was loaned out to Greek side Niki Volos until June 2025.

=== Botafogo-PB ===
On 7 July 2025, Ed Carlos joined Série C side Botafogo-PB also on loan. Despite not featuring in any matches, he signed a permanent deal with the club on 24 December, with Santos retaining 30% of his economic rights.

== Career statistics ==
As of 24 July 2026

Club	Season	League			State League		Cup		Continental		Other		Total	
Club	Season	Division	Apps	Goals	Apps	Goals	Apps	Goals	Apps	Goals	Apps	Goals	Apps	Goals
Santos	2021	Série A	0	0	—		0	0	—		6 (Note: Appearance(s) in Copa Paulista)	0	6	0
Santos	2022	Série A	6	0	—		0	0	—		—		6	0
Santos	2023	Série A	4	0	—		1	0	2 (Note: Appearance(s) in Copa Sudamericana)	0	—		7	0
Santos	Total		10	0	0	0	1	0	2	0	6	0	19	0
Betim (loan)	2024	Mineiro Módulo II	—		3	0	—		—		—		3	0
Niki Volos (loan)	2024–25	Super League Greece 2	21	0	—		—		—		—		21	0
Botafogo-PB	2025	Série C	0	0	—		—		—		—		0	0
Botafogo-PB	2026	Série C	0	0	6	0	0	0	—		1 (Note: Appearance(s) in Copa do Nordeste)	0	7	0
Botafogo-PB	Total		0	0	6	0	0	0	—		1	0	7	0
Career total			31	0	9	0	1	0	2	0	7	0	50	0

== Honours ==
São Paulo

- Copa São Paulo de Futebol Júnior: 2019

Betim

- Campeonato Mineiro Módulo II: 2024
