= Cadu (footballer, born 2002) =

Brazilian footballer

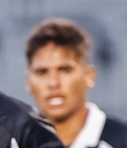

Personal information
- Full name: Carlos Eduardo Bertolassi da Silva
- Date of birth: 21 February 2002 (age 24)
- Place of birth: Matão, Brazil
- Height: 1.70 m (5 ft 7 in)
- Position: Right back

Team information
- Current team: Rimavská Sobota

Youth career
- 2013–2023: Santos

Senior career*
Years	Team	Apps	(Gls)
2023–2024	Santos	1	(0)
2024–2025	Kotwica Kołobrzeg	0	(0)
2025–	Rimavská Sobota	0	(0)

International career
2017	Brazil U15		(1)
- * Club domestic league appearances and goals as of 15:07, 27 September 2024 (UTC)

Carlos Eduardo Bertolassi da Silva (born 21 February 2002), commonly known as Cadu, is a Brazilian professional footballer who plays as a right-back for Slovak club Rimavská Sobota.

== Club career ==
=== Santos ===
Born in Matão, São Paulo, Cadu joined Santos' youth setup in 2013, aged ten. On 2 October 2018, he signed his first professional contract with the club, until 2021.

In December 2019, Cadu suffered a serious knee injury, being sidelined until the following August. On 25 May 2021, he renewed his contract until September 2023.

Cadu played his first senior match on 14 September 2021, starting with the B-team in a 2–0 away loss against EC São Bernardo, for the year's Copa Paulista. On 19 April 2023, he further extended his link with the club until the end of 2024.

Cadu made his professional debut on 29 June 2023, starting in a 0–0 home draw against Blooming for the year's Copa Sudamericana, as both sides were already eliminated. He made his Série A debut three days later, coming on as a second-half substitute for João Lucas in a 3–0 away defeat to Cuiabá.

After being separated from the first team squad for the 2024 season, Cadu terminated his contract with Santos on 28 June of that year.

=== Kotwica Kołobrzeg ===
On 24 September 2024, Cadu joined Polish second-tier club Kotwica Kołobrzeg, debuting on the same day in a 3–2 win over the ŁKS Łódź's reserves in the first round of the Polish Cup.

=== Rimavská Sobota ===
In February 2025, Cadu signed with Slovak 3. Liga side Rimavská Sobota.

== International career ==
On 27 October 2017, Cadu was called up to Brazil under-15 football team for the 2017 South American U-15 Championship in Argentina. He scored the nation's opening goal in a 5–0 home routing of Bolivia, as his side finished second.

== Career statistics ==
As of match played 24 September 2024

Appearances and goals by club, season and competition
Club	Season	League			State league		National cup (Note: Includes Polish Cup)		Continental		Other		Total	
Club	Season	Division	Apps	Goals	Apps	Goals	Apps	Goals	Apps	Goals	Apps	Goals	Apps	Goals
Santos	2021	Série A	0	0	—		—		—		1 (Note: Appearance(s) in Copa Paulista)	0	1	0
Santos	2023	Série A	1	0	0	0	0	0	1 (Note: Appearance(s) in Copa Sudamericana)	0	—		2	0
Santos	Total		1	0	0	0	0	0	1	0	1	0	3	0
Kotwica Kołobrzeg	2024–25	I liga	0	0	—		1	0	—		—		1	0
Career total			1	0	0	0	1	0	1	0	1	0	4	0
