= Dodi (footballer) =

Brazilian footballer (born 1996)

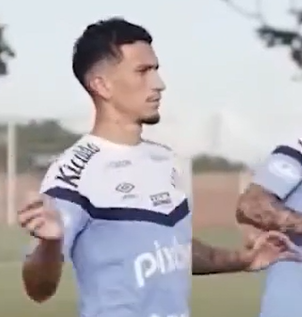
- Dodi training with Santos in 2023

Personal information
- Full name: Douglas Moreira Fagundes
- Date of birth: 17 April 1996 (age 30)
- Place of birth: Santo Antônio do Sudoeste, Brazil
- Height: 1.69 m (5 ft 7 in)
- Position: Defensive midfielder

Team information
- Current team: Grêmio
- Number: 17

Youth career
- 2008–2013: Grêmio
- 2014–2015: Criciúma

Senior career*
Years	Team	Apps	(Gls)
2014–2018	Criciúma	134	(8)
2018	→ Fluminense (loan)	17	(0)
2019–2020	Fluminense	63	(2)
2021–2022	Kashiwa Reysol	45	(1)
2023	Santos	39	(0)
2024–	Grêmio	94	(0)
- * Club domestic league appearances and goals as of 7 April 2026

Douglas Moreira Fagundes (born 17 April 1996), commonly known as Dodi, is a Brazilian professional footballer who plays as a defensive midfielder for Grêmio.

== Career ==
=== Early career ===
Born in Santo Antônio do Sudoeste, Paraná, Dodi joined Grêmio's youth setup in 2008, aged 12. He left the club in the end of 2013, and later moved to Criciúma.

=== Criciúma ===
After initially appearing for the under-20 side, Dodi made his first team – and Série A – debut for Criciúma on 23 November 2014, starting in a 1–1 away draw against Flamengo, as his side suffered relegation. He scored his first senior goal the following 8 May, netting the opener in a 2–1 Série B away win over Mogi Mirim; it was also his debut in the competition.

Dodi became a regular starter for the club in October 2015, under manager Roberto Cavalo. He became an undisputed first-choice in the following year, and renewed his contract until December 2018 on 4 April of that year. However, he left the club shortly after, and ended his period at Tigre by scoring nine goals in 147 appearances overall.

=== Fluminense ===
On 19 April 2018, Dodi was announced at Fluminense back in the top tier, on loan until the end of the year and with a buyout clause. He made his debut for the club on 6 May, coming on as a late substitute for Pedro in a 2–1 away win over Vitória.

Despite being mainly a backup option to Richard and Jadson, Dodi signed a permanent contract with Flu on 12 January 2019, agreeing to a deal until the end of 2020. However, he was only a fourth-choice during the entire 2019 campaign, behind Yuri, Allan and Airton.

Dodi profitted from the arrival of Odair Hellmann as manager for the 2020 season, and became a starter. He refused a contract renewal in October of that year, with his agents stating that the offer was "too low", and was separated from the first team squad in November, with Fluminense releasing a note saying that the player's staff already negotiated him with a foreign club.

=== Kashiwa Reysol ===
On 10 February 2021, Dodi was announced at J1 League side Kashiwa Reysol. He made his debut abroad on 1 May, replacing Keiya Shiihashi in a 1–0 loss at Vegalta Sendai.

Dodi scored his first goal in Japan on 27 August 2022, netting Kashiwa's first in a 6–3 home loss against FC Tokyo.

=== Santos ===
On 14 December 2022, Dodi returned to his home country after being announced as the new signing of Santos, on a three-year contract. He made his debut for the club the following 14 January, starting in a 2–1 Campeonato Paulista home win over Mirassol.

=== Grêmio ===
On 22 December 2023, after Santos' first-ever relegation, Dodi was transferred to Grêmio also in the top tier, signing a three-year contract.

== Career statistics ==
As of 4 December 2023.

Club	Season	League			State League (Note: Includes Campeonato Catarinense, Campeonato Carioca and Campeonato Paulista.)		Cup (Note: Includes Copa do Brasil and Emperor's Cup.)		League Cup (Note: Includes J.League Cup.)		Continental (Note: Includes Copa Sudamericana.)		Other (Note: Includes Primeira Liga.)		Total	
Club	Season	Division	Apps	Goals	Apps	Goals	Apps	Goals	Apps	Goals	Apps	Goals	Apps	Goals	Apps	Goals
Criciúma	2014	Série A	3	0	0	0	0	0	—		—		—		3	0
Criciúma	2015	Série B	16	1	7	0	1	0	—		—		—		24	1
Criciúma	2016	Série B	32	2	17	1	2	0	—		—		2	0	53	3
Criciúma	2017	Série B	28	2	15	1	4	1	—		—		1	0	48	4
Criciúma	2018	Série B	1	0	15	1	2	0	—		—		0	0	18	1
Criciúma	Total		80	5	54	3	9	1	—		—		3	0	146	9
Fluminense	2018	Série A	17	0	—		—		—		1	0	—		18	0
Fluminense	2019	Série A	9	0	8	1	3	0	—		2	0	—		18	1
Fluminense	2020	Série A	19	1	10	0	3	0	—		0	0	—		32	1
Fluminense	Total		45	1	18	1	6	0	—		3	0	—		72	2
Kashiwa Reysol	2021	J1 League	16	0	—		2	0	3	0	—		—		21	0
Kashiwa Reysol	2022	J1 League	29	1	—		3	0	5	0	—		—		37	1
Kashiwa Reysol	Total		45	1	—		5	0	8	0	—		—		58	1
Santos	2023	Série A	28	0	11	0	6	0	—		4	0	—		49	0
Career total			198	7	83	4	26	1	8	0	7	0	3	0	325	12

=== Honours ===
Fluminense

- Campeonato Carioca: 2020

Grêmio

- Campeonato Gaúcho: 2024, 2026
- Recopa Gaúcha: 2025
