= Balão (footballer, born 2003) =

Brazilian footballer

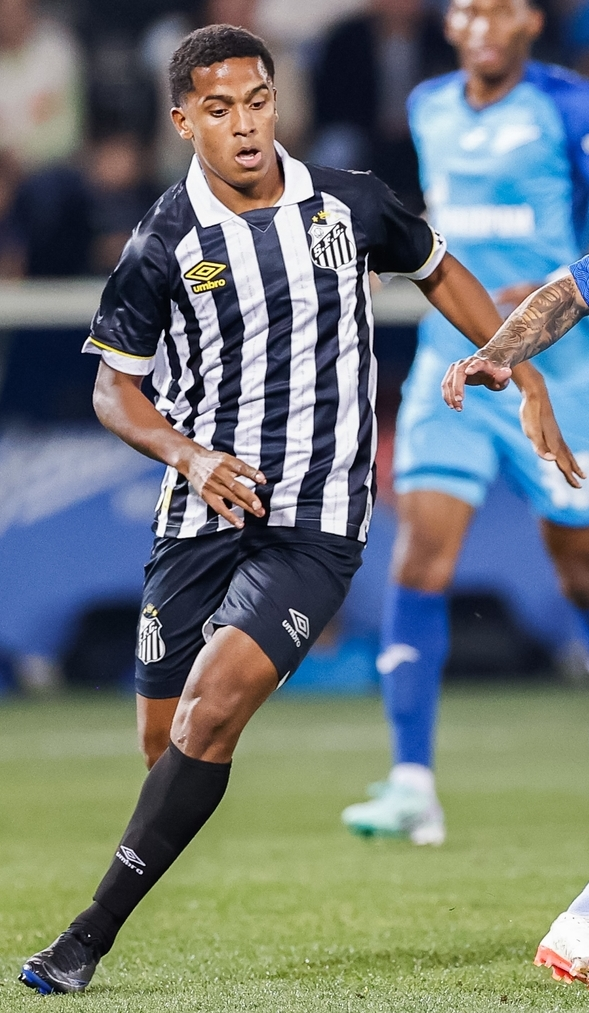
- Balão with Santos in 2024

Personal information
- Full name: João Victor de Amorim Marinho
- Date of birth: 7 January 2003 (age 23)
- Place of birth: São Luís, Brazil
- Height: 1.78 m (5 ft 10 in)
- Position: Midfielder

Team information
- Current team: Capivariano

Youth career
- 2018–2020: São Luís FC
- 2020–2021: Moto Club
- 2021–2023: Santos

Senior career*
Years	Team	Apps	(Gls)
2021	Moto Club	5	(0)
2023–2025	Santos	0	(0)
2025	→ Sampaio Corrêa (loan)	17	(2)
2025	→ Botafogo-PB (loan)	0	(0)
2026–	Capivariano	2	(0)
- * Club domestic league appearances and goals as of 16:19, 1 July 2025 (UTC)

João Victor de Amorim Marinho (born 7 January 2003), known as João Victor or Balão, is a Brazilian footballer who plays as a midfielder for Capivariano.

== Club career ==
=== Early career ===
Born in São Luís, Maranhão, Balão started his career with local youth side São Luís FC in the end of 2018. In July 2020, after failed trials at Vasco da Gama, Flamengo and Ferroviária, he moved to Moto Club.

=== Moto Club ===
After impressing with the under-20s, Balão was promoted to the main squad of Moto in February 2021, and made his senior debut on 2 May, coming on as a second-half substitute in a 1–1 Campeonato Maranhense away draw against Juventude Samas. He featured in the following three matches of the tournament, earning his first start late in the month in the second leg of the Final against Sampaio Corrêa (1–3 home loss).

=== Santos ===
In July 2021, Balão moved to Santos, initially assigned to the under-20 team. On 31 January 2023, he was promoted to the first team for trainings, and renewed his contract until December 2025.

During the 2024 season, however, after finishing his spell in the under-20s, Balão was separated from the first team squad.

==== Loans to Sampaio Corrêa and Botafogo-PB ====
On 20 December 2024, Sampaio Corrêa announced the signing of Balão on a one-year loan deal. On 10 June of the following year, he moved to Série C side Botafogo-PB also in a temporary deal.

=== Capivariano ===
On 12 November 2025, Balão rescinded his contract with Santos, and joined Capivariano.

== Career statistics ==
As of 1 July 2025.

Club	Season	League			State League		Cup		Continental		Other		Total	
Club	Season	Division	Apps	Goals	Apps	Goals	Apps	Goals	Apps	Goals	Apps	Goals	Apps	Goals
Moto Club	2021	Série D	1	0	4	0	—		—		0	0	5	0
Santos	2023	Série A	0	0	0	0	0	0	0	0	—		0	0
Santos	2024	Série B	0	0	—		—		—		—		0	0
Santos	Total		0	0	0	0	0	0	0	0	—		0	0
Sampaio Corrêa (loan)	2025	Série D	4	0	9	2	1	0	—		3 (Note: Appearance(s) in Copa do Nordeste)	0	17	2
Botafogo-PB (loan)	2025	Série C	0	0	—		—		—		—		0	0
Capivariano	2026	Paulista	—		0	0	—		—		—		0	0
Career total			5	0	13	2	1	0	0	0	3	0	22	2
