= Rodrigo Fernández (footballer) =

Uruguayan footballer (born 1996)

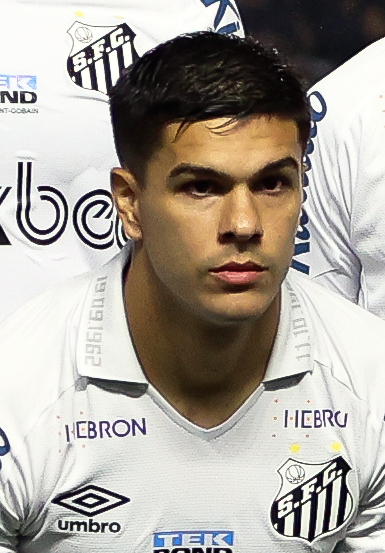
- Fernández with Santos in 2022

Personal information
- Full name: Rodrigo Fernández Cedrés
- Date of birth: 3 January 1996 (age 30)
- Place of birth: Montevideo, Uruguay
- Height: 1.72 m (5 ft 8 in)
- Position: Defensive midfielder

Team information
- Current team: Huracán (on loan from Independiente)
- Number: 5

Youth career
- 2009–2016: Danubio

Senior career*
| Years | Team | Apps | (Gls) |
| 2016–2019 | Danubio | 61 | (0) |
| 2019 | → Guaraní (loan) | 38 | (1) |
| 2020–2022 | Guaraní | 56 | (5) |
| 2022 | → Santos (loan) | 29 | (0) |
| 2023–2025 | Santos | 35 | (1) |
| 2024 | → Newell's Old Boys (loan) | 28 | (0) |
| 2025 | → Independiente (loan) | 21 | (0) |
| 2026– | Independiente | 12 | (0) |
| 2026– | → Huracán (loan) | 1 | (0) |
- * Club domestic league appearances and goals as of 16:45, 12 August 2026 (UTC)

Rodrigo Fernández Cedrés (born 3 January 1996) is a Uruguayan professional footballer who plays as a defensive midfielder for Huracán, on loan from Independiente.

== Career ==
=== Danubio ===
Born in Montevideo, Fernández was a Danubio youth graduate, having joined their youth setup in 2009. He made his first team – and Primera División – debut on 3 September 2016, starting in a 1–2 away loss against Rampla Juniors. The following 9 August, after already establishing himself as a starter, he renewed his contract with the club.

=== Guaraní ===
On 17 December 2018, Fernández moved abroad and signed for Paraguayan Primera División side Guaraní, on loan for one year. An immediate first-choice, he scored his first professional goal on 4 October 2019, netting the equalizer in a 1–1 home draw against Libertad.

In November 2019, Fernández stated his interest on remaining at the club for the following season, and Guaraní announced the permanent contract of Fernández until 2022 in December, after buying 50% of his economic rights.

=== Santos ===
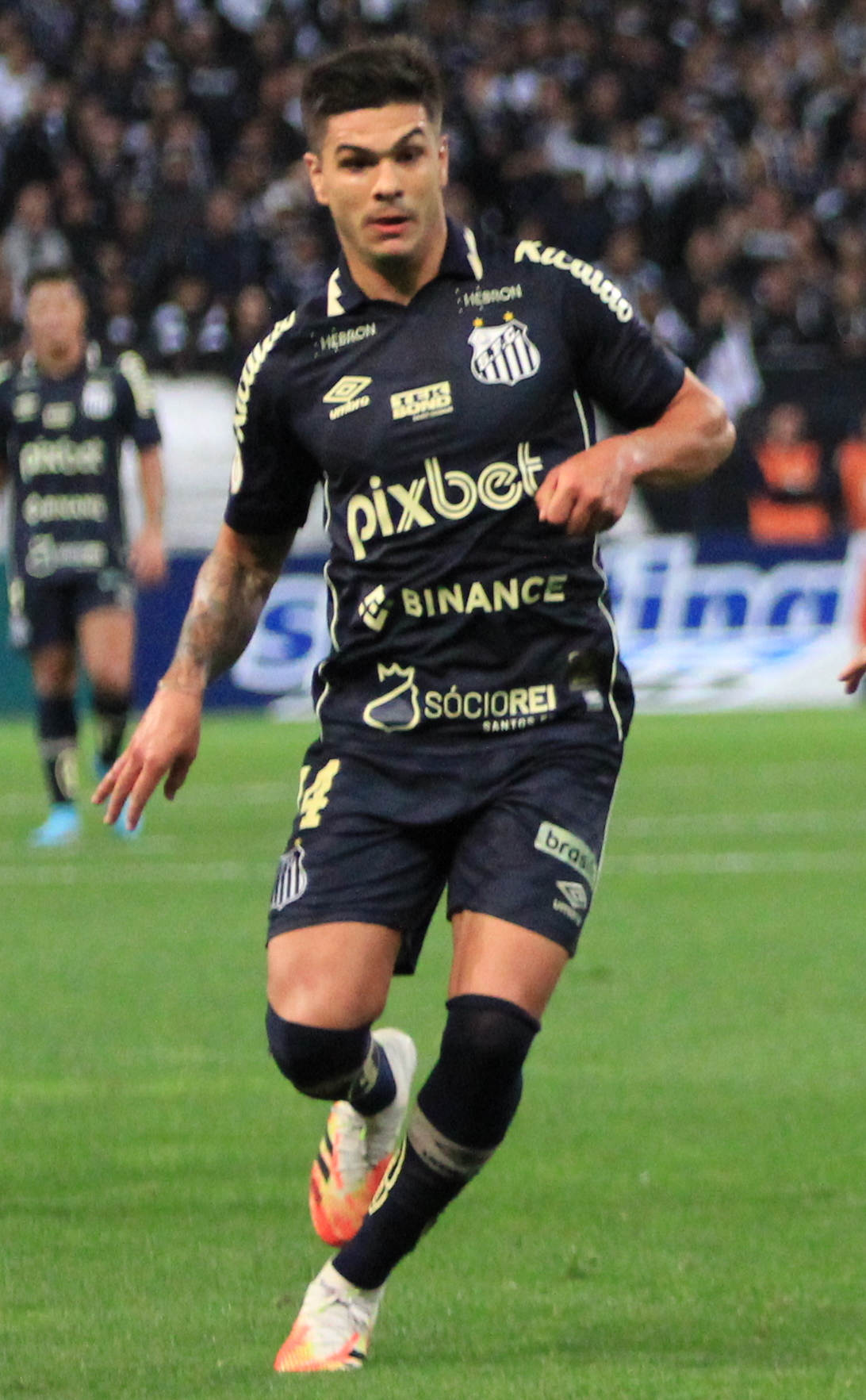
Fernández with Santos in 2022

On 29 March 2022, Fernández agreed to a loan deal with Campeonato Brasileiro Série A side Santos until the end of the year, with a buyout clause. He made his debut on 5 April, starting in a 0–1 Copa Sudamericana away loss against Banfield.

Fernández scored his first goal for Peixe on 12 May 2022, netting his team's third in a 3–0 Copa do Brasil home win over Coritiba. He was a regular starter for the club until the end of the year, and featured in 38 matches overall during the season.

On 6 December 2022, Fernández signed a permanent three-year contract with Santos, as the club activated his buyout clause.

==== Loan to Newell's Old Boys ====
On 18 January 2024, Fernández was loaned to Argentine Primera División side Newell's Old Boys until the end of the year. He was regularly used by the club, appearing in 31 matches.

==== Loan to Independiente ====
On 11 January 2025, Fernández remained in Argentina after agreeing to a one-year loan deal with Independiente.

== Career statistics ==
As of 16 December 2025

| Club | Season | League | | | Cup | | Continental | | State League | | Other | | Total | |
| Club | Season | Division | Apps | Goals | Apps | Goals | Apps | Goals | Apps | Goals | Apps | Goals | Apps | Goals |
|---|---|---|---|---|---|---|---|---|---|---|---|---|---|---|
| Danubio | 2016 | Uruguayan Primera División | 9 | 0 | — | | — | | — | | — | | 9 | 0 |
| Danubio | 2017 | Uruguayan Primera División | 22 | 0 | — | | 1 (Note: Appearance(s) in Copa Sudamericana) | 0 | — | | — | | 23 | 0 |
| Danubio | 2018 | Uruguayan Primera División | 30 | 0 | — | | 2 | 0 | — | | — | | 32 | 0 |
| Danubio | Total | | 61 | 0 | — | | 3 | 0 | — | | — | | 64 | 0 |
| Guaraní | 2019 | Paraguayan Primera División | 38 | 1 | 5 | 0 | 1 | 0 | — | | — | | 44 | 1 |
| Guaraní | 2020 | Paraguayan Primera División | 23 | 3 | — | | 8 (Note: Appearance(s) in Copa Libertadores) | 0 | — | | — | | 31 | 3 |
| Guaraní | 2021 | Paraguayan Primera División | 27 | 2 | 0 | 0 | 3 | 0 | — | | — | | 30 | 2 |
| Guaraní | 2022 | Paraguayan Primera División | 6 | 0 | 0 | 0 | 2 | 0 | — | | — | | 8 | 0 |
| Guaraní | Total | | 74 | 6 | 5 | 0 | 14 | 0 | — | | — | | 93 | 6 |
| Santos | 2022 | Série A | 29 | 0 | 4 | 1 | 5 | 0 | — | | — | | 38 | 1 |
| Santos | 2023 | Série A | 30 | 1 | 6 | 0 | 4 | 0 | 5 (Note: Appearance(s) in Campeonato Paulista) | 0 | — | | 45 | 1 |
| Santos | Total | | 59 | 1 | 10 | 1 | 9 | 0 | 5 | 0 | — | | 83 | 2 |
| Newell's Old Boys (loan) | 2024 | Argentine Primera División | 28 (Note: Soccerway counts Copa de la Liga Profesional appearances as league appearances.) | 0 | 3 | 0 | — | | — | | — | | 31 | 0 |
| Independiente (loan) | 2025 | Argentine Primera División | 21 | 0 | 2 | 0 | 6 | 0 | — | | — | | 29 | 0 |
| Career total | | | 243 | 7 | 20 | 1 | 32 | 0 | 5 | 0 | 0 | 0 | 300 | 8 |
