= Daniel Ruiz (footballer, born 2001) =

Colombian footballer

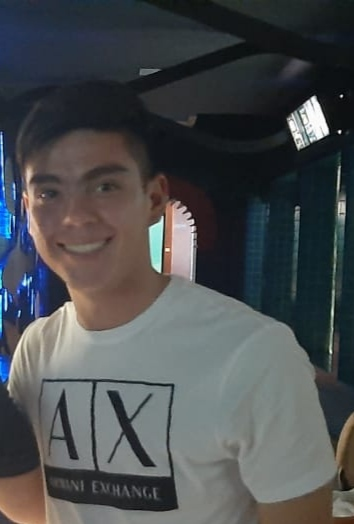
- Ruiz in 2023

Personal information
- Full name: Daniel Felipe Ruiz Rivera
- Date of birth: 30 July 2001 (age 25)
- Place of birth: Bogotá, Colombia
- Height: 1.71 m (5 ft 7 in)
- Position: Winger

Team information
- Current team: Millonarios
- Number: 19

Youth career
- 2011–2015: Dinhos
- 2016–2017: Deportivo Cali
- 2018: Fortaleza CEIF

Senior career*
Years	Team	Apps	(Gls)
2018–2021	Fortaleza CEIF	19	(1)
2021	→ Millonarios (loan)	44	(4)
2022–	Millonarios	127	(14)
2023	→ Santos (loan)	12	(0)
2025–2026	→ CSKA Moscow (loan)	2	(0)

International career^{‡}
2021	Colombia U20	1	(0)
2023–	Colombia	2	(0)
2023	Colombia U23	4	(1)
- * Club domestic league appearances and goals as of 20 June 2026 ‡ National team caps and goals as of 16 December 2023

Daniel Felipe Ruiz Rivera (born 30 July 2001) is a Colombian footballer who plays as winger for Millonarios and the Colombia national team.

== Club career ==
=== Fortaleza CEIF ===
Born in Bogotá, Ruiz began his career with a local side named CD Dinhos, before joining Deportivo Cali's youth setup in 2016. After two years playing for the latter, he left and moved to Fortaleza CEIF.

Ruiz made his senior debut with Fortaleza on 7 October 2018, playing the last four minutes in a 1–1 Categoría Primera B away draw against Deportes Quindío; it was his only appearance of the season. He subsequently started to feature more regularly for the side, becoming a starter in the later stages of the 2020 season and scoring his first goal on 14 November of that year, in a 1–1 draw at Llaneros.

=== Millonarios ===
On 30 December 2020, Ruiz moved to Categoría Primera A side Millonarios on a one-year loan deal, with a buyout clause. He made his club – and top tier – debut on 16 January 2021, replacing Emerson Rodríguez in a 1–0 home win over Envigado.

Ruiz scored his first goal in the main category on 20 June 2021, netting the opener in a 2–1 home loss against Deportes Tolima. On 12 September, he scored a brace in a 4–3 win at Atlético Bucaramanga.

In January 2022, Millonarios bought Ruiz outright, for a rumoured fee of US$ 350,000; Fortaleza also kept 20% over a future sale.

==== Loan to Santos ====
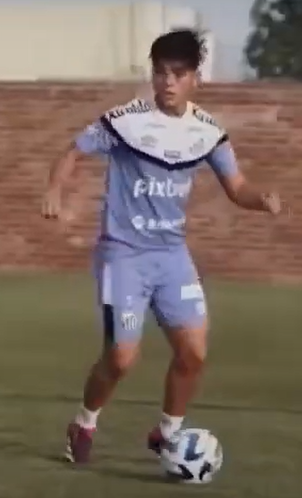
Ruiz training with Santos in 2023

On 7 February 2023, Ruiz moved abroad for the first time in his career, after agreeing to a loan deal with Brazilian club Santos until the end of the year. He made his debut with the club nine days later, replacing Sandry in a 1–1 Campeonato Paulista away draw against Santo André.

After featuring rarely, Ruiz was separated from the first team squad by new head coach Paulo Turra on 4 July 2023. On 4 August, his loan was terminated.

==== Loan to CSKA Moscow ====
On 16 August 2025, Ruiz joined Russian Premier League club CSKA Moscow on loan, with a conditional obligation to buy. He left CSKA at the end of the loan.

== International career ==
After representing Colombia at under-20 level in a friendly in 2021, Ruiz received his first call-up for the full side on 18 January 2023, for a friendly against the United States. He made his full international debut ten days later, replacing Dylan Borrero in the 0–0 draw at the Dignity Health Sports Park in Carson, California.

== Career statistics ==
=== Club ===
As of match played 5 November 2025

Club	Season	League			Cup		Continental		State League		Total	
Club	Season	Division	Apps	Goals	Apps	Goals	Apps	Goals	Apps	Goals	Apps	Goals
Fortaleza CEIF	2018	Categoría Primera B	1	0	0	0	—		—		1	0
Fortaleza CEIF	2019	Categoría Primera B	6	0	4	0	—		—		10	0
Fortaleza CEIF	2020	Categoría Primera B	12	1	4	0	—		—		16	1
Fortaleza CEIF	Total		19	1	8	0	—		—		27	1
Millonarios	2021	Categoría Primera A	44	4	1	0	—		—		45	4
Millonarios	2022	Categoría Primera A	48	7	7	2	2 (Note: Appearance(s) in Copa Libertadores)	0	—		57	9
Millonarios	2023	Categoría Primera A	15	1	6	1	—		—		21	2
Millonarios	2024	Categoría Primera A	38	3	2	0	6	1	—		46	4
Millonarios	2025	Categoría Primera A	26	3	—		1 (Note: Appearance(s) in Copa Sudamericana)	0	—		27	3
Millonarios	Total		171	18	16	3	9	1	—		196	22
Santos (loan)	2023	Série A	9	0	3	0	4	0	3 (Note: Appearance(s) in Campeonato Paulista)	0	19	0
CSKA Moscow (loan)	2025–26	Russian Premier League	2	0	5	0	—		—		7	0
Career total			201	19	32	3	13	1	3	0	249	23

=== International ===
As of 16 December 2023

Appearances and goals by national team and year
National team	Year	Apps	Goals
Colombia	2023	2	0
Total		2	0
