= Arthur Henrique (footballer, born 1997) =

Brazilian footballer

Personal information
- Full name: Arthur Henrique Bittencourt
- Date of birth: 28 January 1997 (age 29)
- Place of birth: Braço do Norte, Brazil
- Height: 1.91 m (6 ft 3 in)
- Position: Goalkeeper

Team information
- Current team: Cuiabá
- Number: 1

Youth career
- Coritiba

Senior career*
| Years | Team | Apps | (Gls) |
| 2018–2021 | Coritiba | 6 | (0) |
| 2019 | → Tupy-ES (loan) | 5 | (0) |
| 2019 | → Foz do Iguaçu (loan) | 1 | (0) |
| 2020 | → Castanhal (loan) | 7 | (0) |
| 2021 | → CRB (loan) | 0 | (0) |
| 2022–2023 | CRB | 3 | (0) |
| 2023 | → Mirassol (loan) | 1 | (0) |
| 2023–2024 | Azuriz | 12 | (0) |
| 2024 | → Londrina (loan) | 13 | (0) |
| 2025– | Cuiabá | 0 | (0) |
- * Club domestic league appearances and goals as of 17 December 2025

Arthur Henrique Bittencourt (born 28 January 1997), known as Arthur Henrique, is a Brazilian professional footballer who plays as a goalkeeper for Cuiabá.
