= Braço do Norte =

- Municipality
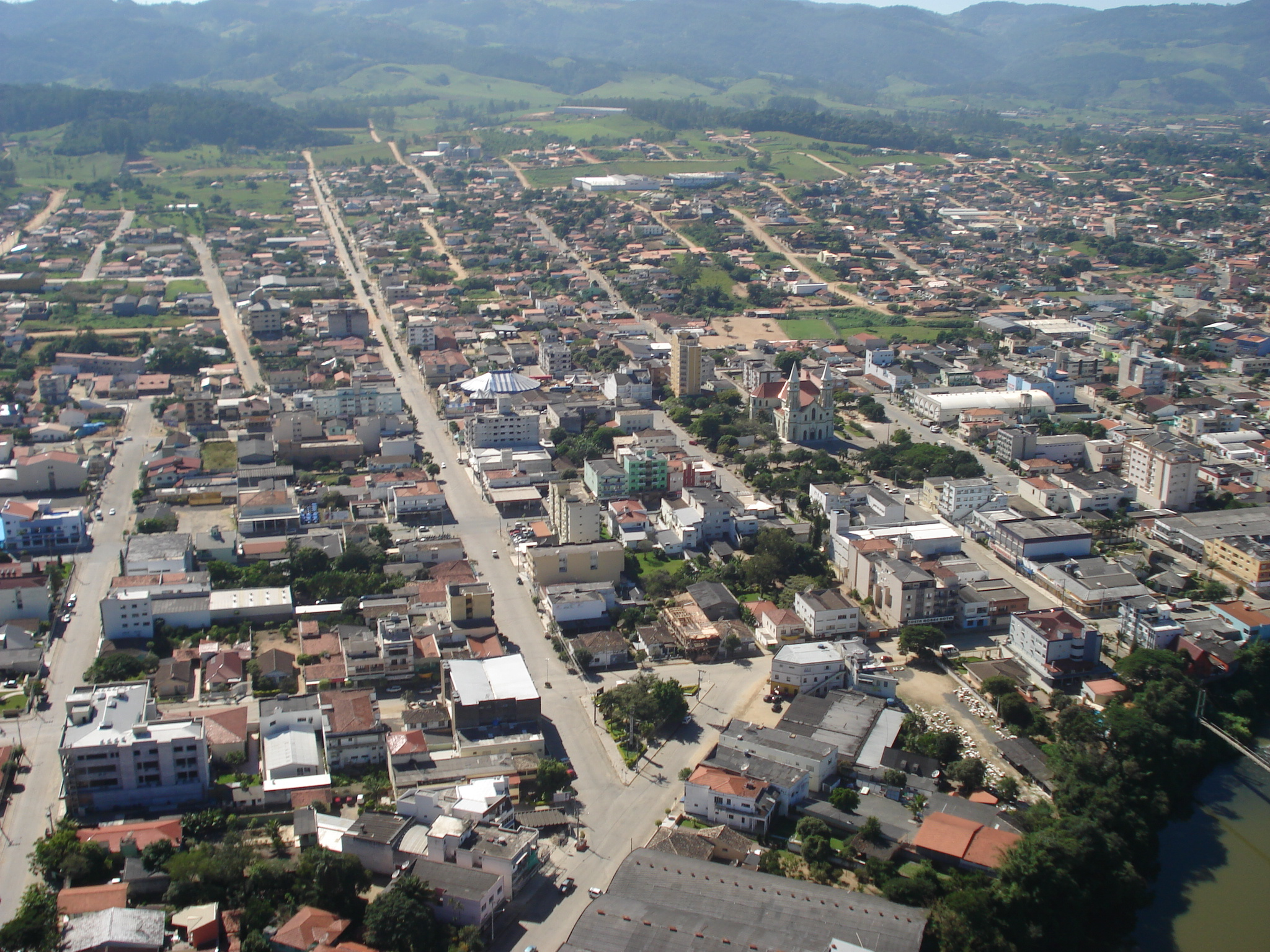

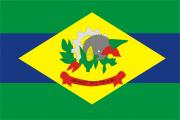
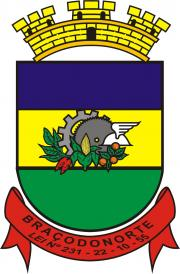
- Flag Coat of arms

- Location in Santa Catarina
- Coordinates: 28°16′30″S 49°09′57″W
- Country: Brazil
- Region: South
- State: Santa Catarina
- Mesoregion: Sul Catarinense

Population (2020)
  - Total: 33,876
- Time zone: UTC -3
- Postal code: 88750-000
- Area code: +55 48
- Website: bracodonorte.sc.gov.br

Braço do Norte is a municipality in the state of Santa Catarina in the South region of Brazil. Most known for its agriculture and square fabrics, it was colonized by mostly German immigrants in the Second World War, as well as Polish and Italians.

== History ==
Braço do Norte was discovered on April 1862, became municipality on 21st June 1958.

== Climate ==
According to the Köppen climate classification, Braço do Norte it is classified as humid subtropical climate (Cfa).

== See also ==
- List of municipalities in Santa Catarina
