= Matheus Salustiano =

Brazilian footballer

Personal information
- Full name: Matheus Salustiano Pires
- Date of birth: 19 April 1993 (age 33)
- Place of birth: Pindamonhangaba, Brazil
- Height: 1.82 m (6 ft 0 in)
- Position: Centre-back

Team information
- Current team: São Bernardo
- Number: 5

Youth career
- 2008–2011: Santo André
- 2011–2013: Vitória

Senior career*
Years	Team	Apps	(Gls)
2013–2017	Vitória	15	(1)
2016	→ Oeste (loan)	3	(0)
2016	→ Confiança (loan)	10	(0)
2017	Confiança	7	(0)
2018–2019	Rio Claro	41	(0)
2020	São Caetano	11	(0)
2020–2021	Ferroviária	25	(0)
2021	Goiás	8	(0)
2022–2023	São Bernardo	64	(0)
2024	Brusque	8	(0)
2024	Guarani	22	(2)
2025–	São Bernardo	31	(0)
- * Club domestic league appearances and goals as of 18 November 2026

Matheus Salustiano Pires (born 19 April 1993) is a Brazilian footballer who plays for São Bernardo as a centre-back.

== Career statistics ==
As of 29 July 2024

Appearances and goals by club, season and competition
Club	Season	League			State league		National Cup		Continental		Other		Total	
Club	Season	Division	Apps	Goals	Apps	Goals	Apps	Goals	Apps	Goals	Apps	Goals	Apps	Goals
Vitória	2013	Série A	0	0	—		—		0	0	—		0	0
Vitória	2014	Série A	2	0	7 (Note: Appearance(s) in Campeonato Baiano)	0	0	0	0	0	6 (Note: Appearance(s) in Copa do Nordeste)	1	15	1
Vitória	2015	Série B	0	0	—		—		—		0	0	0	0
Vitória	2017	Série A	—		—		—		—		0	0	0	0
Vitória	Total		2	0	7	0	0	0	0	0	6	1	15	1
Oeste (loan)	2016	Série B	0	0	3 (Note: Appearance(s) in Campeonato Paulista Série A1)	0	—		—		—		3	0
Confiança (loan)	2016	Série C	10	0	—		—		—		—		10	0
Confiança	2017	Série C	4	0	3 (Note: Appearance(s) in Campeonato Sergipano)	0	—		—		0	0	7	0
Rio Claro	2018	Paulista	—		8 (Note: Appearance(s) in Campeonato Paulista Série A2)	0	—		—		17 (Note: Appearance(s) in Copa Paulista)	0	25	0
Rio Claro	2019	Paulista	—		16	0	—		—		—		16	0
Rio Claro	Total		—		24	0	—		—		17	0	41	0
São Caetano	2020	Paulista	—		11	0	—		—		—		11	0
Ferroviária	2020	Série D	13	0	—		0	0	—		—		13	0
Ferroviária	2021	Série D	—		12	0	—		—		—		12	0
Ferroviária	Total		13	0	12	0	0	0	—		—		25	0
Goiás	2021	Série B	8	0	—		—		—		—		8	0
São Bernardo	2022	Série D	19	0	11	0	—		—		—		30	0
São Bernardo	2023	Série C	22	0	12	0	—		—		—		34	0
São Bernardo	Total		41	0	23	0	—		—		—		64	0
Brusque	2024	Série B	4	0	4 (Note: Appearance(s) in Campeonato Catarinense)	0	0	0	—		—		8	0
Guarani	2024	Série B	4	1	—		—		—		—		4	1
Career Total			86	1	84	0	0	0	0	0	23	1	193	2

== Honours ==
Confiança

- Campeonato Sergipano: 2017
