= Eduardo Bauermann =

Brazilian footballer (born 1996)

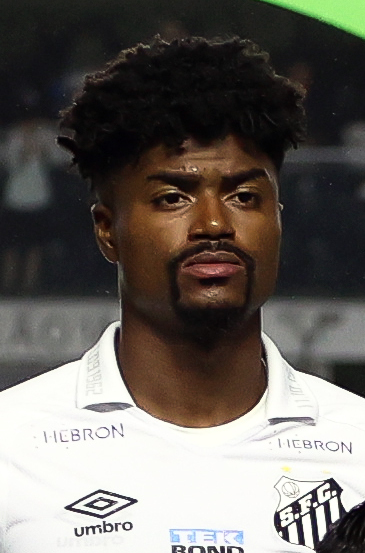
- Bauermann with Santos in 2022

Personal information
- Full name: Eduardo Gabriel dos Santos Bauermann
- Date of birth: 13 February 1996 (age 30)
- Place of birth: Estância Velha, Brazil
- Height: 1.89 m (6 ft 2 in)
- Position: Centre-back

Team information
- Current team: Pachuca
- Number: 4

Youth career
- 2006–2015: Internacional

Senior career*
| Years | Team | Apps | (Gls) |
| 2014–2018 | Internacional | 11 | (1) |
| 2016 | → Náutico (loan) | 16 | (1) |
| 2017 | → Atlético Goianiense (loan) | 14 | (0) |
| 2018 | → Figueirense (loan) | 32 | (0) |
| 2019 | Paraná | 24 | (1) |
| 2020–2021 | América Mineiro | 72 | (2) |
| 2022–2023 | Santos | 59 | (4) |
| 2023 | Alanyaspor | 0 | (0) |
| 2024 | Everton | 15 | (1) |
| 2025– | Pachuca | 65 | (2) |

International career
| 2013 | Brazil U17 | 13 | (0) |
| 2014–2015 | Brazil U20 | 5 | (0) |
- * Club domestic league appearances and goals as of 11 October 2026

Eduardo Gabriel dos Santos Bauermann (born 13 February 1996), known as Eduardo Bauermann, is a Brazilian professional footballer who plays as a centre-back for Liga MX club Pachuca.

== Club career ==
=== Internacional ===
Born in Estância Velha, Rio Grande do Sul, Bauermann joined Internacional's youth setup in June 2006, aged ten. He made his first team debut at the age of just 17 on 26 January 2014, starting in a 2–1 Campeonato Gaúcho away win over Passo Fundo, as his side used an under-23 squad.

Bauermann made his Série A debut with Inter on 17 May 2015, coming on as a second half substitute for Léo Morais in a 1–0 home success over Avaí. Roughly one year later, after being rarely used, he was loaned to Série B side Náutico.

Bauermann immediately became a starter at the Timbu, scoring his first senior goal on 22 July 2016 in a 3–1 defeat of Avaí. On 3 August, however, he was recalled by his parent club, and featured in five league matches as the club suffered their first-ever top tier relegation.

On 3 May 2017, after being again rarely used, Bauermann moved to Atlético Goianiense on loan until December. On 18 December, he moved to Figueirense also in a temporary deal.

=== Paraná ===
On 4 January 2019, Bauermann signed a one-year contract with Paraná, after the club agreed to a "partnership" with Internacional. A backup option to Rodolfo Filemon and Fernando Timbó during the Campeonato Paranaense, he subsequently became a starter during the Série B as his side missed out promotion after finishing sixth.

=== América Mineiro ===
On 4 January 2020, Bauermann agreed to a two-year deal with América Mineiro also in the second division. He featured sparingly in his first season, as his side achieved promotion to the top tier.

Bauermann became a regular starter in his second campaign, featuring in 35 league matches as his side qualified to the Copa Libertadores for the first time ever.

=== Santos ===
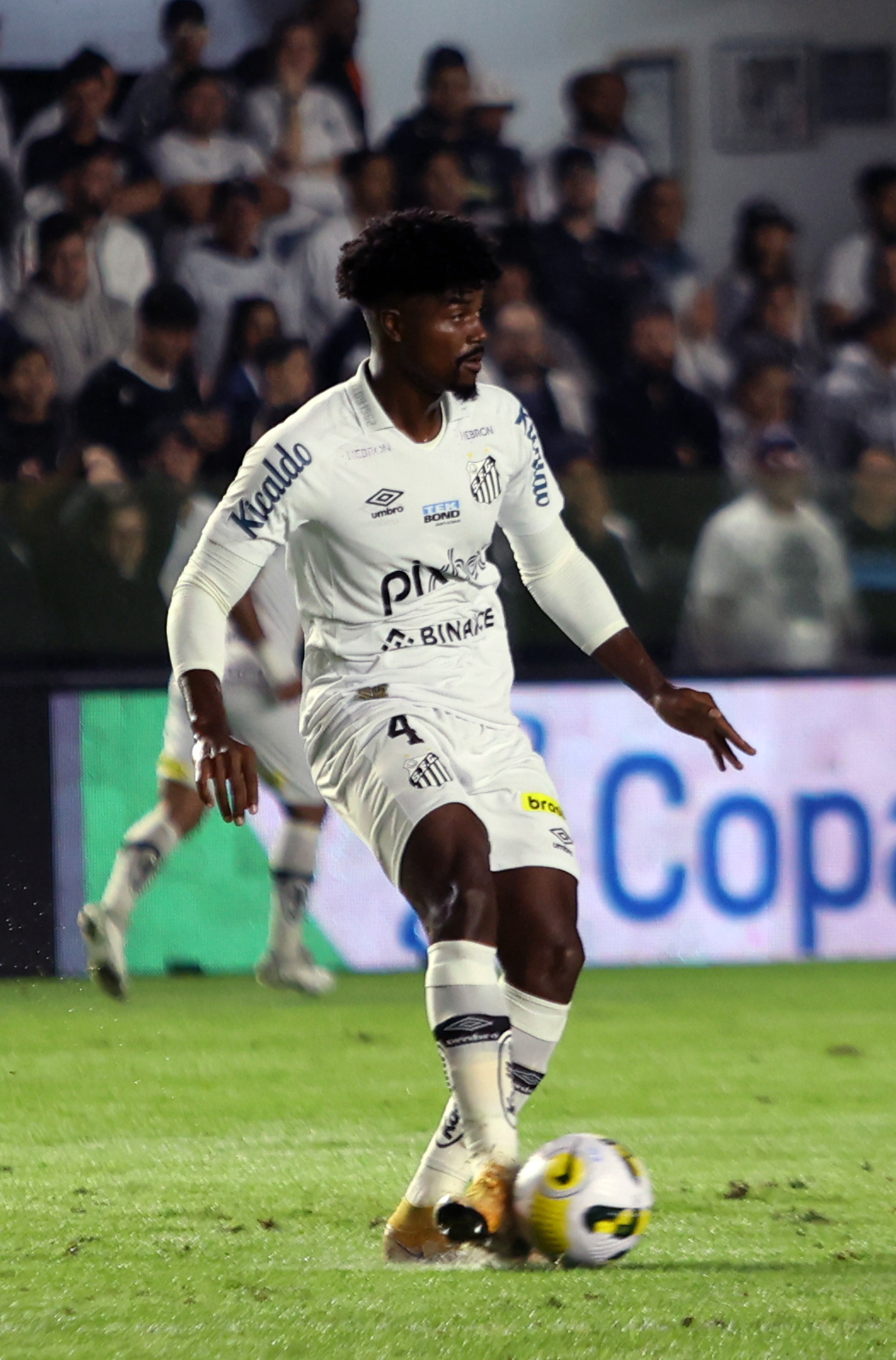
Bauermann playing for Santos in 2022

In November 2021, Bauermann agreed to a pre-contract with Santos, effective as of the following year. On 3 January of the following year, his three-year deal was confirmed by the club.

Bauermann made his debut for Peixe on 26 January 2022, starting in a 0–0 Campeonato Paulista away draw against Inter de Limeira. He scored his first goal for the club on 6 February, netting the opener in a 1–1 draw at Guarani, and established himself as a first choice during the year.

On 29 June 2023, Bauermann left Santos on a mutual agreement.

=== Alanyaspor ===
On 3 July 2023, Bauermann was announced at Turkish side Alanyaspor. On 11 September, however, after the ban was made international by FIFA, he rescinded his contract and left without debuting.

=== Everton de Viña del Mar ===
In June 2024, Bauermann signed with Everton in the Chilean Primera División.

== International career ==
Bauermann represented Brazil at under-17 and under-20 levels, playing in the 2013 South American U-17 Championship and the 2013 FIFA U-17 World Cup with the former and the 2015 South American U-20 Championship with the latter.

== Involvement in match-fixing scandal ==
On 8 May 2023, conversations between Bauermann and a gambler involved in a gang investigated by the Public Ministry of Goiás were leaked. The following day, after a meeting, Santos announced, in an official note, that Bauermann was separated from the first team squad.

On 16 May 2023, Bauermann's contract with Santos was suspended. He was judged by the STJD on 1 June and received a 12-match ban; the decision was later changed to a 360-day suspension from the sport and a R$ 35,000 fine on 7 July.

== Career statistics ==
As of 23 May 2023

Appearances and goals by club, season and competition
| Club | Season | League | | | State League | | Cup | | Continental | | Other | | Total | |
| Club | Season | Division | Apps | Goals | Apps | Goals | Apps | Goals | Apps | Goals | Apps | Goals | Apps | Goals |
|---|---|---|---|---|---|---|---|---|---|---|---|---|---|---|
| Internacional | 2014 | Série A | 0 | 0 | 1 | 0 | — | | — | | — | | 1 | 0 |
| Internacional | 2015 | Série A | 4 | 0 | 0 | 0 | — | | — | | — | | 4 | 0 |
| Internacional | 2016 | Série A | 5 | 0 | 0 | 0 | 3 | 0 | — | | 0 | 0 | 8 | 0 |
| Internacional | 2017 | Série B | 0 | 0 | 1 | 0 | 0 | 0 | — | | 1 (Note: Appearance(s) in Primeira Liga) | 0 | 2 | 0 |
| Internacional | Total | | 9 | 0 | 2 | 0 | 3 | 0 | — | | 1 | 0 | 15 | 0 |
| Náutico (loan) | 2016 | Série B | 16 | 1 | — | | — | | — | | — | | 16 | 1 |
| Atlético Goianiense (loan) | 2017 | Série A | 14 | 0 | — | | 1 | 0 | — | | — | | 15 | 0 |
| Figueirense (loan) | 2018 | Série B | 24 | 0 | 20 | 0 | 2 | 0 | — | | — | | 46 | 0 |
| Paraná | 2019 | Série B | 20 | 0 | 4 | 1 | 0 | 0 | — | | — | | 24 | 1 |
| América Mineiro | 2020 | Série B | 14 | 1 | 12 | 0 | 5 | 0 | — | | — | | 31 | 1 |
| América Mineiro | 2021 | Série A | 35 | 1 | 14 | 0 | 4 | 0 | — | | — | | 53 | 1 |
| América Mineiro | Total | | 49 | 2 | 26 | 0 | 9 | 0 | — | | — | | 84 | 2 |
| Santos | 2022 | Série A | 33 | 1 | 12 | 1 | 6 | 0 | 7 (Note: Appearance(s) in Copa Sudamericana) | 0 | — | | 58 | 2 |
| Santos | 2023 | Série A | 3 | 1 | 11 | 1 | 3 | 0 | 3 | 1 | — | | 20 | 3 |
| Santos | Total | | 36 | 2 | 23 | 2 | 9 | 0 | 10 | 1 | — | | 78 | 5 |
| Career total | | | 168 | 5 | 75 | 3 | 24 | 0 | 10 | 1 | 1 | 0 | 278 | 9 |

== Honours ==
Individual

- Liga MX Best XI: Clausura 2026
