= 2021 Santos FC season =

Santos
2021 season
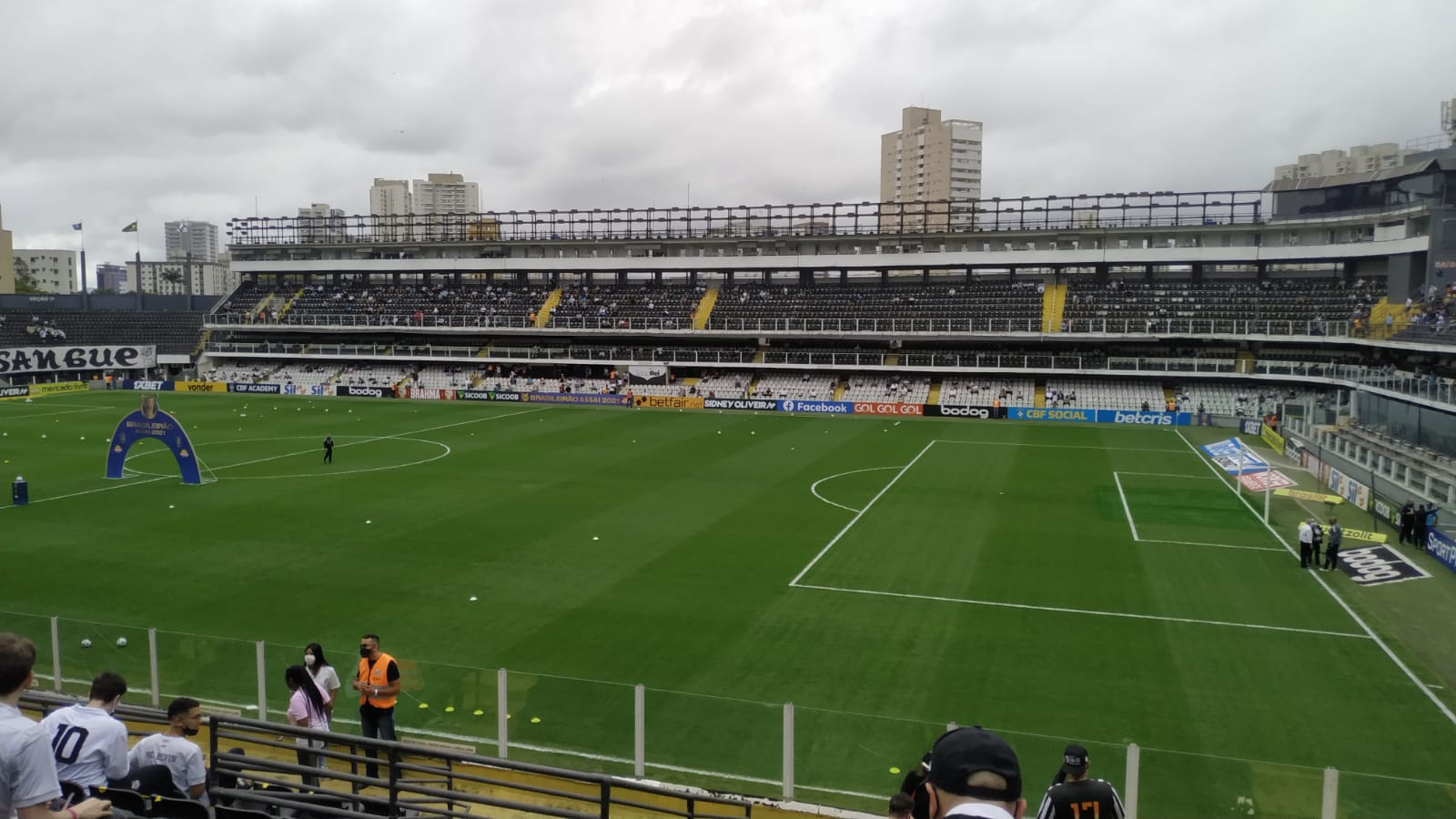
- Vila Belmiro prior to a match against Grêmio on 10 October
- President: Andrés Rueda
- Coach: Ariel Holan (until 25 April); Marcelo Fernandes (caretaker, 26 April 2021 – 6 May 2021); Fernando Diniz (from 7 May 2021 – until 5 September 2021); Fábio Carille (since 8 September 2021)
- Stadium: Vila Belmiro
- Campeonato Brasileiro: 10th
- Campeonato Paulista: Group stage
- Copa do Brasil: Quarter-finals
- Copa Libertadores: Group stage
- Copa Sudamericana: Quarter-finals
- Top goalscorer: League: Marinho (6); All: Marinho (9)
| Home colours | Away colours | Third colours |

The 2021 season was Santos FC's 109th season in existence and the club's sixty-second consecutive season in the top flight of Brazilian football. As well as the Campeonato Brasileiro, the club competed in the Copa do Brasil, Campeonato Paulista and the Copa Libertadores.

== Players ==
=== Squad information ===
As of 10 December 2021

| No. | Name | Pos. | Nat. | Place of birth | Date of birth (age) | Club caps | Club goals | Int. caps | Int. goals | Signed from | Date signed | Fee | Contract End |
Goalkeepers
| 31 | John Victor | GK | (Brazil) | Diadema (São Paulo (state)) | 13 February 1996 (aged 25) | 27 | 0 | – | – | Youth System | 15 January 2016 | Free | 31 December 2024 |
| 34 | João Paulo | GK | (Brazil) | Dourados (Mato Grosso do Sul) | 29 June 1995 (aged 26) | 90 | 0 | – | – | Youth System | 26 February 2014 | Free | 31 August 2025 |
| 50 | Paulo Mazoti | GK | (Brazil) | Ribeirão Pires (São Paulo (state)) | 11 July 2000 (aged 21) | – | – | – | – | Youth System | 13 November 2020 | Free | 31 December 2022 |
| 52 | Diógenes | GK | (Brazil) | Itapecerica da Serra (São Paulo (state)) | 6 January 2001 (aged 20) | – | – | – | – | Youth System | 9 July 2021 | Free | 31 December 2024 |
| 93 | Jandrei | GK | (Brazil) | Itaqui (Rio Grande do Sul) | 1 March 1993 (aged 28) | 1 | 0 | – | – | Genoa (Italy) | 25 August 2021 | Free | 31 May 2022 |
Defenders
| 2 | Luiz Felipe | CB | (Brazil) | Tubarão (Santa Catarina (state)) | 9 October 1993 (aged 28) | 151 | 4 | – | – | Paraná | 17 February 2016 | R$ 1M | 31 December 2024 |
| 3 | Felipe Jonatan | LB | (Brazil) | Fortaleza (Ceará) | 15 February 1998 (aged 23) | 152 | 6 | – | – | Ceará | 1 March 2019 | R$ 6M | 28 February 2025 |
| 13 | Madson | RB | (Brazil) | Itaparica (Bahia) | 13 January 1992 (aged 29) | 85 | 9 | – | – | Grêmio | 14 December 2019 | Swap | 31 December 2022 |
| 14 | Wagner Leonardo | CB/LB | (Brazil) | Praia Grande (São Paulo (state)) | 23 July 1999 (aged 22) | 40 | 1 | – | – | Youth System | 21 February 2019 | Free | 31 August 2024 |
| 21 | Pará | RB | (Brazil) | São João do Araguaia (Pará) | 14 February 1986 (aged 35) | 291 | 3 | – | – | Flamengo | 1 August 2019 | Free | 31 December 2022 |
| 22 | Danilo Boza | CB | (Brazil) | Rondonópolis (Mato Grosso) | 6 May 1998 (aged 23) | 22 | 0 | – | – | Mirassol | 2 June 2021 | Loan | 31 December 2021 |
| 26 | Robson Reis | CB/DM | (Brazil) | Vitória da Conquista (Bahia) | 21 May 2000 (aged 21) | 12 | 0 | – | – | Youth System | 27 February 2021 | Free | 31 January 2024 |
| 28 | Kaiky | CB | (Brazil) | Santos (São Paulo (state)) | 12 January 2004 (aged 17) | 37 | 1 | – | – | Youth System | 27 February 2021 | Free | 30 November 2023 |
| 32 | Jhonnathan | CB/DM | (Brazil) | Foz do Iguaçu (Paraná (state)) | 4 March 2001 (aged 20) | 4 | 0 | – | – | Youth System | 2 March 2021 | Free | 30 April 2026 |
| 33 | Sandro Perpétuo | RB/DM | (Brazil) | Governador Valadares (Minas Gerais) | 29 June 2001 (aged 20) | 5 | 0 | – | – | Youth System | 27 February 2021 | Free | 22 November 2022 |
| 40 | Wellington Tim | CB/LB | (Brazil) | Rio de Janeiro (Rio de Janeiro (state)) | 5 June 2001 (aged 20) | 4 | 0 | – | – | Youth System | 21 January 2021 | Loan | 31 December 2021 |
| 42 | Moraes | LB | (Brazil) | Goianira (Goiás) | 3 October 1997 (aged 24) | 15 | 0 | – | – | Atlético Goianiense | 28 May 2021 | Loan | 30 April 2022 |
| 61 | Velázquez | CB | (Uruguay) | Montevideo | 30 April 1994 (aged 27) | 10 | 0 | – | – | Rayo Vallecano (Spain) | 6 September 2021 | Free | 31 December 2022 |
| — | Cléber Reis | CB | (Brazil) | São Francisco do Conde (Bahia) | 5 December 1990 (aged 31) | 10 | 0 | – | – | Hamburger SV (Germany) | 13 December 2016 | R$ 7.3M | 31 January 2022 |
Midfielders
| 6 | Sandry | DM/CM | (Brazil) | Itabuna (Bahia) | 30 August 2002 (aged 19) | 40 | 0 | – | – | Youth System | 18 January 2019 | Free | 31 May 2026 |
| 7 | Pato Sánchez | CM/AM | (Uruguay) | Montevideo | 2 December 1984 (aged 37) | 140 | 32 | 38 | 1 | Monterrey (Mexico) | 23 July 2018 | Free | 22 July 2023 |
| 8 | Jobson | DM | (Brazil) | São Paulo (São Paulo (state)) | 13 September 1995 (aged 26) | 41 | 3 | – | – | Red Bull Brasil | 18 April 2019 | R$ 4M | 15 April 2024 |
| 15 | Ivonei | CM/AM | (Brazil) | Rondonópolis (Mato Grosso) | 16 April 2002 (aged 19) | 30 | 1 | – | – | Youth System | 12 July 2019 | Free | 31 July 2025 |
| 17 | Vinicius Balieiro | DM/RB | (Brazil) | Campinas (São Paulo (state)) | 28 May 1999 (aged 22) | 50 | 3 | – | – | Youth System | 13 November 2020 | Free | 31 December 2025 |
| 18 | Augusto | AM/LW | (Brazil) | Ribeirão Preto (São Paulo (state)) | 25 March 1999 (aged 22) | – | – | – | – | Real Madrid (Spain) | 16 August 2021 | Loan | 30 June 2022 |
| 20 | Gabriel Pirani | AM/SS | (Brazil) | Penápolis (São Paulo (state)) | 12 April 2002 (aged 19) | 61 | 5 | – | – | Youth System | 13 November 2020 | Free | 31 December 2025 |
| 23 | Marcos Guilherme | RW | (Brazil) | Itararé (São Paulo (state)) | 5 August 1995 (aged 26) | 45 | 6 | – | – | Internacional | 28 May 2021 | Loan | 30 June 2022 |
| 24 | Kevin Malthus | CM/DM | (Brazil) | Belém (Pará) | 11 January 2003 (aged 18) | 11 | 1 | – | – | Youth System | 27 February 2021 | Free | 31 March 2026 |
| 25 | Vinicius Zanocelo | MF | (Brazil) | Santo André (São Paulo (state)) | 30 January 2001 (aged 20) | 26 | 0 | – | – | Ferroviária | 7 June 2021 | Loan | 31 May 2023 |
| 29 | Guilherme Camacho | DM | (Brazil) | Rio de Janeiro (Rio de Janeiro (state)) | 2 March 1990 (aged 31) | 34 | 0 | – | – | Corinthians | 15 June 2021 | Free | 31 December 2022 |
| 37 | Matías Lacava | AM | (Venezuela) | Chacao | 24 October 2002 (aged 19) | 2 | 0 | – | – | Academia Puerto Cabello (Venezuela) | 19 August 2021 | Loan | 31 December 2022 |
| 40 | Anderson Ceará | AM | (Brazil) | Tianguá (Ceará) | 21 May 1999 (aged 22) | 4 | 0 | – | – | Youth System | 20 November 2018 | Free | 31 July 2023 |
| 41 | Jean Mota | AM/LB | (Brazil) | São Paulo (São Paulo (state)) | 15 October 1993 (aged 28) | 258 | 20 | – | – | Fortaleza | 9 June 2016 | Free | 30 June 2022 |
| 47 | Luizinho | AM | (Brazil) | Mafra (Santa Catarina (state)) | 3 May 1999 (aged 22) | 2 | 0 | – | – | Coritiba | 10 August 2021 | Free | 31 December 2024 |
| — | Lucas Barbosa | DM | (Brazil) | Bebedouro (São Paulo (state)) | 22 February 2001 (aged 20) | 2 | 0 | – | – | Youth System | 10 April 2022 | Free | 31 August 2025 |
Forwards
| 9 | Léo Baptistão | ST | (Brazil) | Santos (São Paulo (state)) | 26 August 1992 (aged 29) | 8 | 0 | – | – | Wuhan Zall (China) | 21 August 2021 | Free | 31 May 2023 |
| 11 | Marinho | SS | (Brazil) | Penedo (Alagoas) | 29 May 1990 (aged 31) | 113 | 41 | – | – | Grêmio | 24 May 2019 | R$ 4M | 31 December 2022 |
| 12 | Raniel | ST | (Brazil) | Recife (Pernambuco) | 11 June 1996 (aged 25) | 33 | 3 | – | – | São Paulo | 13 December 2019 | Swap | 31 December 2023 |
| 19 | Bruno Marques | ST | (Brazil) | Recife (Pernambuco) | 22 February 1999 (aged 22) | 33 | 4 | – | – | Youth System | 13 November 2020 | R$ 600K | 31 December 2024 |
| 27 | Ângelo | SS | (Brazil) | Brasília (Federal District (Brazil)) | 21 December 2004 (aged 16) | 51 | 1 | – | – | Youth System | 22 October 2020 | Free | 20 December 2023 |
| 30 | Lucas Braga | SS | (Brazil) | São Paulo (São Paulo (state)) | 10 November 1996 (aged 25) | 99 | 11 | – | – | Luverdense | 5 June 2019 | Free | 30 April 2026 |
| 36 | Marcos Leonardo | ST | (Brazil) | Itapetinga (Bahia) | 3 May 2003 (aged 18) | 62 | 12 | – | – | Youth System | 21 July 2020 | Free | 22 October 2022 |
| 43 | Renyer | SS | (Brazil) | Rio de Janeiro (Rio de Janeiro (state)) | 12 July 2003 (aged 18) | 8 | 0 | – | – | Youth System | 23 January 2020 | Free | 30 November 2023 |
| 49 | Lucas Venuto | SS | (Brazil) | Governador Valadares (Minas Gerais) | 14 January 1995 (aged 26) | 8 | 0 | – | – | Vancouver Whitecaps (Canada) | 2 August 2019 | Free | 31 December 2022 |
| 99 | Diego Tardelli | ST | (Brazil) | Santa Bárbara d'Oeste (São Paulo (state)) | 10 May 1985 (aged 36) | 13 | 1 | 14 | 3 | Free agent | 23 August 2021 | Free | 31 December 2021 |
| — | Fernandinho | SS | (Brazil) | Uberaba (Minas Gerais) | 20 March 2003 (aged 18) | 1 | 0 | – | – | Youth System | 2 March 2021 | Free | 12 December 2022 |

Source: SantosFC.com.br (for appearances and goals), Wikipedia players' articles (for international appearances and goals), FPF (for contracts). Players in italic were not registered for the Campeonato Paulista

=== Copa Libertadores squad ===
- Players in ~~strike~~ were no longer in the squad until the team's last match (26 May)
- Players in italic were included in the last submission

Note: Flags indicate national team as defined under FIFA eligibility rules; some limited exceptions apply. Players may hold more than one non-FIFA nationality.

| No. | Pos. | Nation | Player |
|---|---|---|---|
| 1 | GK | BRA | Vladimir |
| 2 | DF | BRA | Luiz Felipe |
| 3 | DF | BRA | Felipe Jonatan |
| 4 | DF | BRA | Pará |
| 5 | MF | BRA | Alison |
| 6 | DF | BRA | ~~Laércio~~ |
| 7 | MF | URU | Carlos Sánchez |
| 8 | MF | BRA | Jobson |
| 9 | FW | BRA | Kaio Jorge |
| 10 | MF | VEN | ~~Yeferson Soteldo~~ |
| 11 | FW | BRA | Marinho |
| 12 | DF | BRA | Cadu |
| 13 | DF | BRA | Madson |
| 14 | DF | BRA | Luan Peres |
| 15 | DF | BRA | Mikael Doka |
| 16 | FW | COL | Jonathan Copete |
| 17 | MF | BRA | Vinicius Balieiro |
| 18 | MF | BRA | Guilherme Nunes |
| 19 | FW | BRA | Bruno Marques |
| 20 | MF | BRA | Gabriel Pirani |
| 21 | MF | BRA | Lucas Barbosa |
| 22 | DF | BRA | Pedrinho Scaramussa |
| 23 | FW | BRA | ~~Arthur Gomes~~ |
| 24 | MF | BRA | Kevin Malthus |
| 25 | FW | BRA | Fernandinho |

| No. | Pos. | Nation | Player |
|---|---|---|---|
| 26 | DF | BRA | Robson Reis |
| 27 | FW | BRA | Ângelo Gabriel |
| 28 | DF | BRA | Kaiky |
| 29 | FW | BRA | Allanzinho |
| 30 | FW | BRA | Lucas Braga |
| 31 | GK | BRA | John Victor |
| 32 | DF | BRA | Jhonnathan |
| 33 | DF | BRA | Sandro Perpétuo |
| 34 | GK | BRA | João Paulo |
| 35 | DF | BRA | ~~Sabino~~ |
| 36 | FW | BRA | Marcos Leonardo |
| 37 | MF | BRA | Lucas Lourenço |
| 38 | MF | BRA | Sandry |
| 39 | FW | BRA | ~~Tailson~~ |
| 40 | MF | BRA | Anderson Ceará |
| 41 | MF | BRA | Jean Mota |
| 42 | DF | BRA | ~~Wagner Leonardo~~ |
| 43 | FW | BRA | Renyer |
| 44 | DF | BRA | Alex |
| 45 | MF | BRA | Ivonei |
| 46 | GK | BRA | Matheus Saldanha |
| 47 | MF | BRA | Victor Yan |
| 48 | DF | BRA | Derick |
| 49 | FW | BRA | Lucas Venuto |
| 50 | GK | BRA | Paulo Mazoti |

Source: Conmebol.com

=== Copa Sudamericana squad ===
- Players in ~~strike~~ are no longer in the squad
- Players in italic were included in the last submission

Note: Flags indicate national team as defined under FIFA eligibility rules; some limited exceptions apply. Players may hold more than one non-FIFA nationality.

| No. | Pos. | Nation | Player |
|---|---|---|---|
| 1 | GK | BRA | John |
| 2 | DF | BRA | Luiz Felipe |
| 3 | DF | BRA | Felipe Jonatan |
| 4 | DF | BRA | Derick |
| 5 | MF | BRA | ~~Alison~~ |
| 6 | DF | BRA | Gustavo Moreira |
| 7 | MF | URU | Carlos Sánchez |
| 8 | MF | BRA | Jobson |
| 9 | FW | BRA | ~~Kaio Jorge~~ |
| 10 | MF | BRA | Gabriel Pirani |
| 11 | FW | BRA | Marinho |
| 12 | FW | BRA | Raniel |
| 13 | DF | BRA | Madson |
| 14 | DF | BRA | Wagner Leonardo |
| 15 | MF | BRA | Ivonei |
| 16 | DF | BRA | Cadu |
| 17 | MF | BRA | Vinicius Balieiro |
| 18 | MF | BRA | Felipe Carvalho |
| 19 | FW | BRA | Bruno Marques |
| 20 | MF | BRA | Guilherme Camacho |
| 21 | DF | BRA | Pará |
| 22 | DF | BRA | Danilo Boza |
| 23 | FW | BRA | Marcos Guilherme |
| 24 | MF | BRA | Kevin Malthus |
| 25 | FW | BRA | Vinicius Zanocelo |

| No. | Pos. | Nation | Player |
|---|---|---|---|
| 26 | DF | BRA | Robson Reis |
| 27 | FW | BRA | Ângelo Gabriel |
| 28 | DF | BRA | Kaiky |
| 29 | FW | BRA | Fernandinho |
| 30 | FW | BRA | Lucas Braga |
| 31 | GK | BRA | Diógenes |
| 32 | MF | BRA | Victor Yan |
| 33 | DF | BRA | Sandro Perpétuo |
| 34 | GK | BRA | João Paulo |
| 35 | MF | BRA | Lucas Barbosa |
| 36 | FW | BRA | Marcos Leonardo |
| 37 | MF | BRA | ~~Lucas Lourenço~~ |
| 38 | FW | BRA | Wesley Santos |
| 39 | FW | BRA | Alexandre Tam |
| 40 | MF | BRA | Anderson Ceará |
| 41 | MF | BRA | Jean Mota |
| 42 | DF | BRA | Moraes |
| 43 | FW | BRA | Renyer |
| 44 | DF | BRA | ~~Alex~~ |
| 45 | DF | BRA | João Cubas |
| 46 | GK | BRA | Matheus Saldanha |
| 47 | FW | BRA | Brayan Krüger |
| 48 | FW | BRA | Rwan Seco |
| 49 | FW | BRA | Lucas Venuto |
| 50 | GK | BRA | Paulo Mazoti |

Source: Conmebol.com

=== Appearances and goals ===
| No. | Pos. | Nat | Name | Campeonato Brasileiro | | Campeonato Paulista | | Copa Libertadores | | Copa do Brasil | | Copa Sudamericana | | Total | |
| No. | Pos. | Nat | Name | Apps | Goals | Apps | Goals | Apps | Goals | Apps | Goals | Apps | Goals | Apps | Goals |
|---|---|---|---|---|---|---|---|---|---|---|---|---|---|---|---|
| 93 | GK | (Brazil) | Jandrei | 1 | 0 | 0 | 0 | 0 | 0 | 0 | 0 | 0 | 0 | 1 | 0 |
| 34 | GK | (Brazil) | João Paulo | 33 | 0 | 3 | 0 | 10 | 0 | 4 | 0 | 4 | 0 | 54 | 0 |
| 31 | GK | (Brazil) | John Victor | 4 | 0 | 5 | 0 | 0 | 0 | 2 | 0 | 0 | 0 | 11 | 0 |
| 1 | GK | (Brazil) | Vladimir | 0 | 0 | 4 | 0 | 0 | 0 | 0 | 0 | 0 | 0 | 4 | 0 |
| 44 | DF | (Brazil) | Alex | 0 | 0 | 4+1 | 0 | 0 | 0 | 0 | 0 | 0 | 0 | 5 | 0 |
| 22 | DF | (Brazil) | Danilo Boza | 16+6 | 0 | 0 | 0 | 0 | 0 | 0 | 0 | 0 | 0 | 22 | 0 |
| 3 | DF | (Brazil) | Felipe Jonatan | 30+3 | 0 | 6 | 0 | 10 | 2 | 6 | 0 | 3 | 0 | 58 | 2 |
| 32 | DF | (Brazil) | Jhonnathan | 0 | 0 | 2+2 | 0 | 0 | 0 | 0 | 0 | 0 | 0 | 4 | 0 |
| 28 | DF | (Brazil) | Kaiky | 15 | 0 | 7 | 0 | 10 | 1 | 1+1 | 0 | 3 | 0 | 37 | 1 |
| 14 | DF | (Brazil) | Luan Peres | 7 | 0 | 7 | 0 | 10 | 0 | 2 | 0 | 0 | 0 | 26 | 0 |
| 2 | DF | (Brazil) | Luiz Felipe | 23 | 0 | 4 | 0 | 0+1 | 0 | 4 | 0 | 4 | 0 | 36 | 0 |
| 13 | DF | (Brazil) | Madson | 15+16 | 3 | 0 | 0 | 2+6 | 0 | 2+1 | 1 | 3+1 | 0 | 46 | 4 |
| 42 | DF | (Brazil) | Moraes | 4+9 | 0 | 0 | 0 | 0 | 0 | 0 | 0 | 1+1 | 0 | 15 | 0 |
| 21 | DF | (Brazil) | Pará | 17+3 | 0 | 4+2 | 0 | 9 | 1 | 4 | 0 | 1 | 0 | 40 | 1 |
| 26 | DF | (Brazil) | Robson Reis | 7+1 | 0 | 2+1 | 0 | 0 | 0 | 0+1 | 0 | 0 | 0 | 12 | 0 |
| 35 | DF | (Brazil) | Sabino | 0 | 0 | 1 | 1 | 0 | 0 | 0 | 0 | 0 | 0 | 1 | 1 |
| 35 | DF | (Brazil) | Sandro Perpétuo | 0 | 0 | 4+1 | 0 | 0 | 0 | 0 | 0 | 0 | 0 | 5 | 0 |
| 61 | DF | (Uruguay) | Velázquez | 10 | 0 | 0 | 0 | 0 | 0 | 0 | 0 | 0 | 0 | 10 | 0 |
| 14 | DF | (Brazil) | Wagner Leonardo | 10+6 | 1 | 2 | 0 | 0 | 0 | 3 | 0 | 1+1 | 0 | 23 | 1 |
| 35 | DF | (Brazil) | Wellington Tim | 0 | 0 | 1+1 | 0 | 0 | 0 | 0 | 0 | 0 | 0 | 2 | 0 |
| 5 | MF | (Brazil) | Alison | 5+1 | 0 | 2+1 | 0 | 7 | 0 | 2 | 0 | 0+1 | 0 | 19 | 0 |
| 40 | MF | (Brazil) | Anderson Ceará | 0 | 0 | 0+1 | 0 | 0 | 0 | 0 | 0 | 0 | 0 | 1 | 0 |
| 29 | MF | (Brazil) | Camacho | 25+5 | 0 | 0 | 0 | 0 | 0 | 0 | 0 | 4 | 0 | 34 | 0 |
| 20 | MF | (Brazil) | Gabriel Pirani | 21+11 | 3 | 7+1 | 1 | 8+2 | 1 | 6 | 0 | 3+1 | 0 | 60 | 5 |
| 25 | MF | (Brazil) | Guilherme Nunes | 0 | 0 | 2+1 | 0 | 0 | 0 | 0 | 0 | 0 | 0 | 3 | 0 |
| 15 | MF | (Brazil) | Ivonei | 1+4 | 0 | 2+2 | 0 | 1+1 | 0 | 1+3 | 0 | 0+1 | 0 | 16 | 0 |
| 41 | MF | (Brazil) | Jean Mota | 21+2 | 2 | 8+1 | 1 | 4+3 | 0 | 5+1 | 0 | 4 | 0 | 49 | 3 |
| 8 | MF | (Brazil) | Jobson | 0+1 | 0 | 0 | 0 | 0 | 0 | 0 | 0 | 0 | 0 | 1 | 0 |
| 24 | MF | (Brazil) | Kevin Malthus | 0+1 | 0 | 5+2 | 0 | 0+3 | 1 | 0 | 0 | 0 | 0 | 11 | 1 |
| 37 | MF | (Venezuela) | Lacava | 0+2 | 0 | 0 | 0 | 0 | 0 | 0 | 0 | 0 | 0 | 2 | 0 |
| 21 | MF | (Brazil) | Lucas Barbosa | 0 | 0 | 1+1 | 0 | 0 | 0 | 0 | 0 | 0 | 0 | 2 | 0 |
| 37 | MF | (Brazil) | Lucas Lourenço | 0 | 0 | 3+5 | 0 | 0+3 | 0 | 0 | 0 | 0 | 0 | 11 | 0 |
| 47 | MF | (Brazil) | Luizinho | 0+2 | 0 | 0 | 0 | 0 | 0 | 0 | 0 | 0 | 0 | 2 | 0 |
| 23 | MF | (Brazil) | Marcos Guilherme | 32+3 | 5 | 0 | 0 | 0 | 0 | 3+3 | 1 | 4 | 0 | 45 | 6 |
| 7 | MF | (Uruguay) | Sánchez | 14+14 | 5 | 0 | 0 | 0 | 0 | 3+1 | 1 | 3+1 | 1 | 36 | 7 |
| 6 | MF | (Brazil) | Sandry | 1+3 | 0 | 2 | 0 | 2 | 0 | 0 | 0 | 0 | 0 | 8 | 0 |
| 17 | MF | (Brazil) | Vinicius Balieiro | 4+9 | 0 | 8+2 | 1 | 6+2 | 2 | 2+2 | 0 | 0 | 0 | 35 | 3 |
| 25 | MF | (Brazil) | Vinicius Zanocelo | 15+8 | 0 | 0 | 0 | 0 | 0 | 1 | 0 | 0+2 | 0 | 26 | 0 |
| 29 | FW | (Brazil) | Allanzinho | 0 | 0 | 2+2 | 0 | 0+1 | 0 | 0 | 0 | 0 | 0 | 5 | 0 |
| 27 | FW | (Brazil) | Ângelo | 5+14 | 0 | 8+1 | 0 | 5+3 | 1 | 1+4 | 0 | 0+1 | 0 | 42 | 1 |
| 23 | FW | (Brazil) | Arthur Gomes | 0 | 0 | 2 | 0 | 0 | 0 | 0 | 0 | 0 | 0 | 2 | 0 |
| 19 | FW | (Brazil) | Bruno Marques | 0+2 | 0 | 3+4 | 1 | 0+3 | 0 | 1+1 | 0 | 0+1 | 0 | 15 | 1 |
| 16 | FW | (Colombia) | Copete | 0 | 0 | 2+2 | 0 | 0+5 | 0 | 0 | 0 | 0 | 0 | 9 | 0 |
| 99 | FW | (Brazil) | Diego Tardelli | 7+5 | 1 | 0 | 0 | 0 | 0 | 0+1 | 0 | 0 | 0 | 13 | 1 |
| 22 | FW | (Brazil) | Fernandinho | 0 | 0 | 0+1 | 0 | 0 | 0 | 0 | 0 | 0 | 0 | 1 | 0 |
| 9 | FW | (Brazil) | Kaio Jorge | 10 | 1 | 5+2 | 3 | 3+4 | 1 | 2 | 1 | 2 | 2 | 28 | 8 |
| 9 | FW | (Brazil) | Léo Baptistão | 8 | 0 | 0 | 0 | 0 | 0 | 0 | 0 | 0 | 0 | 8 | 0 |
| 30 | FW | (Brazil) | Lucas Braga | 23+9 | 1 | 7 | 3 | 7+3 | 2 | 4+1 | 1 | 2+2 | 0 | 58 | 7 |
| 49 | FW | (Brazil) | Lucas Venuto | 0+1 | 0 | 0+2 | 0 | 0 | 0 | 0 | 0 | 0 | 0 | 3 | 0 |
| 36 | FW | (Brazil) | Marcos Leonardo | 6+10 | 5 | 3+4 | 0 | 7+2 | 1 | 2+4 | 1 | 0+2 | 0 | 40 | 7 |
| 11 | FW | (Brazil) | Marinho | 26+1 | 6 | 2+2 | 0 | 5 | 2 | 4 | 1 | 2 | 0 | 42 | 9 |
| 12 | FW | (Brazil) | Raniel | 2+13 | 1 | 0 | 0 | 0 | 0 | 1+1 | 0 | 0+2 | 0 | 19 | 1 |
| 43 | FW | (Brazil) | Renyer | 0 | 0 | 0+4 | 0 | 0 | 0 | 0 | 0 | 0 | 0 | 4 | 0 |
| 10 | FW | (Venezuela) | Soteldo | 0 | 0 | 1+2 | 0 | 4+1 | 1 | 0 | 0 | 0 | 0 | 8 | 1 |
| 39 | FW | (Brazil) | Tailson | 0 | 0 | 1+1 | 0 | 0 | 0 | 0 | 0 | 0 | 0 | 2 | 0 |

Last updated: 10 December 2021
Source: Match reports in Competitive matches, Soccerway

=== Goalscorers ===
| Ran | No. | Pos | Nat | Name | Brasileirão | Paulistão | Copa Libertadores | Copa do Brasil | Copa Sudamericana | Total |
|---|---|---|---|---|---|---|---|---|---|---|
| 1 | 11 | FW | (Brazil) | Marinho | 6 | 0 | 2 | 1 | 0 | 9 |
| 2 | 9 | FW | (Brazil) | Kaio Jorge | 1 | 3 | 1 | 1 | 2 | 8 |
| 3 | 30 | FW | (Brazil) | Lucas Braga | 1 | 3 | 2 | 1 | 0 | 7 |
| 3 | 36 | FW | (Brazil) | Marcos Leonardo | 5 | 0 | 1 | 1 | 0 | 7 |
| 3 | 7 | MF | (Uruguay) | Sánchez | 5 | 0 | 0 | 1 | 1 | 7 |
| 4 | 23 | MF | (Brazil) | Marcos Guilherme | 5 | 0 | 0 | 1 | 0 | 6 |
| 5 | 20 | MF | (Brazil) | Gabriel Pirani | 3 | 1 | 1 | 0 | 0 | 5 |
| 6 | 13 | DF | (Brazil) | Madson | 3 | 0 | 0 | 1 | 0 | 4 |
| 7 | 41 | MF | (Brazil) | Jean Mota | 2 | 1 | 0 | 0 | 0 | 3 |
| 7 | 17 | MF | (Brazil) | Vinicius Balieiro | 0 | 1 | 2 | 0 | 0 | 3 |
| 8 | 3 | DF | (Brazil) | Felipe Jonatan | 0 | 0 | 2 | 0 | 0 | 2 |
| 9 | 27 | FW | (Brazil) | Ângelo Gabriel | 0 | 0 | 1 | 0 | 0 | 1 |
| 9 | 19 | FW | (Brazil) | Bruno Marques | 0 | 1 | 0 | 0 | 0 | 1 |
| 9 | 99 | FW | (Brazil) | Diego Tardelli | 1 | 0 | 0 | 0 | 0 | 1 |
| 9 | 28 | DF | (Brazil) | Kaiky | 0 | 0 | 1 | 0 | 0 | 1 |
| 9 | 24 | MF | (Brazil) | Kevin Malthus | 0 | 0 | 1 | 0 | 0 | 1 |
| 9 | 4 | DF | (Brazil) | Pará | 0 | 0 | 1 | 0 | 0 | 1 |
| 9 | 12 | FW | (Brazil) | Raniel | 1 | 0 | 0 | 0 | 0 | 1 |
| 9 | 35 | DF | (Brazil) | Sabino | 0 | 1 | 0 | 0 | 0 | 1 |
| 9 | 10 | FW | (Venezuela) | Soteldo | 0 | 0 | 1 | 0 | 0 | 1 |
| 9 | 14 | DF | (Brazil) | Wagner Leonardo | 1 | 0 | 0 | 0 | 0 | 1 |
| Own goals | | | | | 1 | 1 | 0 | 0 | 1 | 3 |
| Total | | | | | 35 | 12 | 16 | 7 | 4 | 74 |

Last updated: 10 December 2021
Source: Match reports in Competitive matches

=== Disciplinary record ===
| N | Nat | Pos | Name | Brasileirão | | | Paulista | | | Libertadores | | | Copa do Brasil | | | Sudamericana | | | Total | | |
| N | Nat | Pos | Name | Yellow card | (yellow card) (yellow-red card) | Red card | Yellow card | (yellow card) (yellow-red card) | Red card | Yellow card | (yellow card) (yellow-red card) | Red card | Yellow card | (yellow card) (yellow-red card) | Red card | Yellow card | (yellow card) (yellow-red card) | Red card | Yellow card | (yellow card) (yellow-red card) | Red card |
|---|---|---|---|---|---|---|---|---|---|---|---|---|---|---|---|---|---|---|---|---|---|
| 41 | (Brazil) | MF | Jean Mota | 6 | 0 | 1 | 1 | 0 | 0 | 3 | 0 | 0 | 1 | 0 | 0 | 1 | 0 | 0 | 12 | 0 | 1 |
| 28 | (Brazil) | DF | Kaiky | 4 | 0 | 0 | 1 | 0 | 0 | 2 | 0 | 0 | 1 | 0 | 0 | 2 | 0 | 1 | 10 | 0 | 1 |
| 36 | (Brazil) | FW | Marcos Leonardo | 3 | 0 | 0 | 2 | 0 | 0 | 2 | 0 | 0 | 1 | 0 | 0 | 1 | 0 | 1 | 9 | 0 | 1 |
| 11 | (Brazil) | FW | Marinho | 9 | 0 | 0 | 0 | 0 | 0 | 1 | 0 | 0 | 2 | 0 | 0 | 0 | 0 | 0 | 12 | 0 | 0 |
| 4 | (Brazil) | DF | Pará | 6 | 0 | 0 | 3 | 0 | 0 | 1 | 0 | 0 | 0 | 0 | 0 | 0 | 0 | 0 | 10 | 0 | 0 |
| 5 | (Brazil) | MF | Alison | 3 | 0 | 0 | 0 | 0 | 0 | 3 | 0 | 1 | 0 | 0 | 0 | 0 | 0 | 0 | 6 | 0 | 1 |
| 30 | (Brazil) | FW | Lucas Braga | 4 | 0 | 0 | 2 | 0 | 0 | 1 | 0 | 0 | 1 | 0 | 0 | 0 | 0 | 0 | 8 | 0 | 0 |
| 2 | (Brazil) | DF | Luiz Felipe | 5 | 0 | 0 | 1 | 0 | 0 | 0 | 0 | 0 | 1 | 0 | 0 | 1 | 0 | 0 | 8 | 0 | 0 |
| 3 | (Brazil) | DF | Felipe Jonatan | 4 | 0 | 0 | 1 | 0 | 0 | 1 | 0 | 0 | 0 | 0 | 0 | 1 | 0 | 0 | 7 | 0 | 0 |
| 34 | (Brazil) | GK | João Paulo | 5 | 0 | 0 | 0 | 0 | 0 | 1 | 0 | 0 | 0 | 0 | 0 | 1 | 0 | 0 | 7 | 0 | 0 |
| 23 | (Brazil) | FW | Marcos Guilherme | 6 | 0 | 0 | 0 | 0 | 0 | 0 | 0 | 0 | 0 | 0 | 0 | 1 | 0 | 0 | 7 | 0 | 0 |
| 25 | (Brazil) | MF | Vinicius Zanocelo | 6 | 0 | 0 | 0 | 0 | 0 | 0 | 0 | 0 | 1 | 0 | 0 | 0 | 0 | 0 | 7 | 0 | 0 |
| 17 | (Brazil) | MF | Vinicius Balieiro | 2 | 0 | 0 | 2 | 0 | 0 | 2 | 0 | 0 | 0 | 0 | 0 | 0 | 0 | 0 | 6 | 0 | 0 |
| 14 | (Brazil) | DF | Luan Peres | 3 | 0 | 0 | 1 | 0 | 0 | 1 | 0 | 0 | 0 | 0 | 0 | 0 | 0 | 0 | 5 | 0 | 0 |
| 7 | (Uruguay) | MF | Sánchez | 4 | 0 | 0 | 0 | 0 | 0 | 0 | 0 | 0 | 0 | 0 | 0 | 1 | 0 | 0 | 5 | 0 | 0 |
| 14 | (Brazil) | DF | Wagner Leonardo | 3 | 0 | 0 | 0 | 0 | 0 | 0 | 0 | 0 | 1 | 0 | 0 | 1 | 0 | 0 | 5 | 0 | 0 |
| 29 | (Brazil) | MF | Camacho | 4 | 0 | 0 | 0 | 0 | 0 | 0 | 0 | 0 | 0 | 0 | 0 | 0 | 0 | 0 | 4 | 0 | 0 |
| 9 | (Brazil) | FW | Kaio Jorge | 1 | 0 | 0 | 0 | 0 | 0 | 3 | 0 | 0 | 0 | 0 | 0 | 0 | 0 | 0 | 4 | 0 | 0 |
| 18 | (Brazil) | MF | Guilherme Nunes | 0 | 0 | 0 | 0 | 0 | 1 | 0 | 0 | 0 | 0 | 0 | 0 | 0 | 0 | 0 | 0 | 0 | 1 |
| 35 | (Brazil) | DF | Wellington Tim | 0 | 0 | 0 | 0 | 1 | 0 | 0 | 0 | 0 | 0 | 0 | 0 | 0 | 0 | 0 | 0 | 1 | 0 |
| 37 | (Brazil) | MF | Lucas Lourenço | 0 | 0 | 0 | 2 | 0 | 0 | 1 | 0 | 0 | 0 | 0 | 0 | 0 | 0 | 0 | 3 | 0 | 0 |
| 13 | (Brazil) | DF | Madson | 3 | 0 | 0 | 0 | 0 | 0 | 0 | 0 | 0 | 0 | 0 | 0 | 0 | 0 | 0 | 3 | 0 | 0 |
| 12 | (Brazil) | FW | Raniel | 3 | 0 | 0 | 0 | 0 | 0 | 0 | 0 | 0 | 0 | 0 | 0 | 0 | 0 | 0 | 3 | 0 | 0 |
| 10 | (Venezuela) | FW | Soteldo | 0 | 0 | 0 | 2 | 0 | 0 | 1 | 0 | 0 | 0 | 0 | 0 | 0 | 0 | 0 | 3 | 0 | 0 |
| 27 | (Brazil) | FW | Ângelo | 1 | 0 | 0 | 0 | 0 | 0 | 1 | 0 | 0 | 0 | 0 | 0 | 0 | 0 | 0 | 2 | 0 | 0 |
| 22 | (Brazil) | DF | Danilo Boza | 2 | 0 | 0 | 0 | 0 | 0 | 0 | 0 | 0 | 0 | 0 | 0 | 0 | 0 | 0 | 2 | 0 | 0 |
| 24 | (Brazil) | MF | Kevin Malthus | 0 | 0 | 0 | 2 | 0 | 0 | 0 | 0 | 0 | 0 | 0 | 0 | 0 | 0 | 0 | 2 | 0 | 0 |
| 42 | (Brazil) | DF | Moraes | 2 | 0 | 0 | 0 | 0 | 0 | 0 | 0 | 0 | 0 | 0 | 0 | 0 | 0 | 0 | 2 | 0 | 0 |
| 38 | (Brazil) | MF | Sandry | 1 | 0 | 0 | 0 | 0 | 0 | 1 | 0 | 0 | 0 | 0 | 0 | 0 | 0 | 0 | 2 | 0 | 0 |
| 44 | (Brazil) | DF | Alex | 0 | 0 | 0 | 1 | 0 | 0 | 0 | 0 | 0 | 0 | 0 | 0 | 0 | 0 | 0 | 1 | 0 | 0 |
| 16 | (Colombia) | FW | Copete | 0 | 0 | 0 | 0 | 0 | 0 | 1 | 0 | 0 | 0 | 0 | 0 | 0 | 0 | 0 | 1 | 0 | 0 |
| 99 | (Brazil) | FW | Diego Tardelli | 1 | 0 | 0 | 0 | 0 | 0 | 0 | 0 | 0 | 0 | 0 | 0 | 0 | 0 | 0 | 1 | 0 | 0 |
| 20 | (Brazil) | MF | Gabriel Pirani | 0 | 0 | 0 | 1 | 0 | 0 | 0 | 0 | 0 | 0 | 0 | 0 | 0 | 0 | 0 | 1 | 0 | 0 |
| 9 | (Brazil) | FW | Léo Baptistão | 1 | 0 | 0 | 0 | 0 | 0 | 0 | 0 | 0 | 0 | 0 | 0 | 0 | 0 | 0 | 1 | 0 | 0 |
| 21 | (Brazil) | MF | Lucas Barbosa | 0 | 0 | 0 | 1 | 0 | 0 | 0 | 0 | 0 | 0 | 0 | 0 | 0 | 0 | 0 | 1 | 0 | 0 |
| 43 | (Brazil) | FW | Renyer | 0 | 0 | 0 | 1 | 0 | 0 | 0 | 0 | 0 | 0 | 0 | 0 | 0 | 0 | 0 | 1 | 0 | 0 |
| 26 | (Brazil) | DF | Robson Reis | 1 | 0 | 0 | 0 | 0 | 0 | 0 | 0 | 0 | 0 | 0 | 0 | 0 | 0 | 0 | 1 | 0 | 0 |
| 33 | (Brazil) | DF | Sandro Perpétuo | 0 | 0 | 0 | 1 | 0 | 0 | 0 | 0 | 0 | 0 | 0 | 0 | 0 | 0 | 0 | 1 | 0 | 0 |
| 39 | (Brazil) | FW | Tailson | 0 | 0 | 0 | 1 | 0 | 0 | 0 | 0 | 0 | 0 | 0 | 0 | 0 | 0 | 0 | 1 | 0 | 0 |
| TOTALS | | | | 93 | 0 | 1 | 26 | 1 | 1 | 26 | 0 | 1 | 9 | 0 | 0 | 10 | 0 | 2 | 164 | 1 | 5 |

As of 10 December 2021
Source: Match reports in Competitive matches
(yellow card) = Number of bookings; (yellow card) (yellow-red card) = Number of sending offs after a second yellow card; (red card) = Number of sending offs by a direct red card.

=== Suspensions served ===
| Date | Matches Missed | Player | Reason | Opponents Missed | Competition | Source |
|---|---|---|---|---|---|---|
| 13 March | 1 | Pará | 3x (yellow card) | Botafogo–SP (H) | Campeonato Paulista | |
| 18 April | 1 | Guilherme Nunes | (red card) vs Inter de Limeira | Novorizontino (A) | Campeonato Paulista | |
| 24 April | 1 | Wellington Tim | (red card) vs Corinthians | Red Bull Bragantino (A) | Campeonato Paulista | |
| 27 April | 1 | Alison | 3x (yellow card) | The Strongest (H) | Copa Libertadores | |
| 18 May | 1 | Jean Mota | 3x (yellow card) | Barcelona (A) | Copa Libertadores | |
| 18 May | 2 | Alison | (red card) vs The Strongest | Barcelona (A) | Copa Libertadores | |
| 18 May | 2 | Alison | (red card) vs The Strongest | Independiente (H) | Copa Sudamericana | |
| 12 June | 1 | Luan Peres | 3x (yellow card) | Fluminense (A) | Campeonato Brasileiro | |
| 17 June | 1 | Alison | 3x (yellow card) | São Paulo (H) | Campeonato Brasileiro | |
| 24 June | 1 | Camacho | 3x (yellow card) (2 while playing by Corinthians) | Atlético Mineiro (H) | Campeonato Brasileiro | |
| 27 June | 1 | Marinho | 3x (yellow card) | Sport (H) | Campeonato Brasileiro | |
| 3 July | 1 | Pará | 3x (yellow card) | Athletico Paranaense (H) | Campeonato Brasileiro | |
| 6 July | 1 | Luiz Felipe | 3x (yellow card) | Palmeiras (A) | Campeonato Brasileiro | |
| 10 July | 1 | Jean Mota | 3x (yellow card) | Red Bull Bragantino (A) | Campeonato Brasileiro | |
| 25 July | 1 | Marinho | 3x (yellow card) | Chapecoense (A) | Campeonato Brasileiro | |
| 15 August | 1 | Marcos Guilherme | 3x (yellow card) | Internacional (H) | Campeonato Brasileiro | |
| 19 August | 1 | Kaiky | (red card) vs Libertad | Libertad (A) | Copa Sudamericana | |
| 11 September | 1 | Lucas Braga | 3x (yellow card) | Ceará (A) | Campeonato Brasileiro | |
| 10 October | 1 | Sánchez | 3x (yellow card) | Atlético Mineiro (A) | Campeonato Brasileiro | |
| 10 October | 1 | Felipe Jonatan | 3x (yellow card) | Atlético Mineiro (A) | Campeonato Brasileiro | |
| 13 October | 1 | Jean Mota | 3x (yellow card) | Sport (A) | Campeonato Brasileiro | |
| 13 October | 1 | João Paulo | 3x (yellow card) | Sport (A) | Campeonato Brasileiro | |
| 17 October | 1 | Wagner Leonardo | 3x (yellow card) | América Mineiro (H) | Campeonato Brasileiro | |
| 23 October | 1 | Camacho | 3x (yellow card) | Fluminense (H) | Campeonato Brasileiro | |
| 23 October | 1 | Jean Mota | (red card) vs América Mineiro | Fluminense (H) | Campeonato Brasileiro | |
| 27 October | 1 | Marinho | 3x (yellow card) | Athletico Paranaense (A) | Campeonato Brasileiro | |
| 27 October | 1 | Vinicius Zanocelo | 3x (yellow card) | Athletico Paranaense (A) | Campeonato Brasileiro | |
| 7 November | 1 | Madson | 3x (yellow card) | Red Bull Bragantino (H) | Campeonato Brasileiro | |
| 13 November | 1 | Kaiky | 3x (yellow card) | Chapecoense (H) | Campeonato Brasileiro | |
| 25 November | 1 | Marcos Guilherme | 3x (yellow card) | Internacional (A) | Campeonato Brasileiro | |
| 28 November | 1 | Pará | 3x (yellow card) | Flamengo (A) | Campeonato Brasileiro | |
| 6 December | 1 | Marcos Leonardo | 3x (yellow card) | Cuiabá (H) | Campeonato Brasileiro | |
| 6 December | 1 | Raniel | 3x (yellow card) | Cuiabá (H) | Campeonato Brasileiro | |

== Managers ==
| Name | Nat. | Place of birth | Date of birth (age) | Signed from | Date signed | Role | G | W | D | L | % | Departure | Manner | Contract End |
|---|---|---|---|---|---|---|---|---|---|---|---|---|---|---|
| Marcelo Fernandes | (Brazil) | Santos (São Paulo (state)) | 20 April 1971 (age 55) | Staff | 24 February 2021 | Interim (Note: Interim for the matches against Santo André and Ferroviária while Ariel Holan is not in charge of the team) | 2 | 0 | 2 | 0 | 0.00 | 3 March 2021 | Return (Note: Back to his assistant role after the match) | —N/a |
| Ariel Holan | (Argentina) | Lomas de Zamora | 14 September 1960 (aged 61) | Universidad Católica (Chile) | 22 February 2021 | Permanent | 12 | 4 | 3 | 5 | 33.33 | 26 April 2021 | Resigned | 31 December 2023 |
| Marcelo Fernandes | (Brazil) | Santos (São Paulo (state)) | 20 April 1971 (aged 50) | Staff | 26 April 2021 | Interim | 5 | 2 | 1 | 2 | 40.00 | 9 May 2021 | Return (Note: Back to his assistant role after the appointment of Diniz) | —N/a |
| Fernando Diniz | (Brazil) | Patos de Minas (Minas Gerais) | 27 March 1974 (aged 47) | Free agent | 7 May 2021 | Permanent | 27 | 10 | 7 | 10 | 37.04 | 5 September 2021 | Resigned | 31 December 2021 |
| Márcio Araújo | (Brazil) | São José do Rio Pardo (São Paulo (state)) | 7 May 1960 (aged 61) | Staff | 18 May 2021 | Interim (Note: Interim for the match against The Strongest as Diniz was suspended) | 1 | 0 | 0 | 1 | 0.00 | 18 May 2021 | Return | —N/a |
| Márcio Araújo | (Brazil) | São José do Rio Pardo (São Paulo (state)) | 7 May 1960 (aged 61) | Staff | 26 May 2021 | Interim (Note: Interim for the match against Barcelona SC as Diniz was suspended) | 1 | 0 | 0 | 1 | 0.00 | 26 May 2021 | Return | —N/a |
| Eduardo Zuma | (Brazil) | Leme (São Paulo (state)) | 26 September 1982 (aged 39) | Staff | 6 July 2021 | Interim (Note: Interim for the match against Athletico Paranaense as Diniz was suspended) | 1 | 1 | 0 | 0 | 100.00 | 6 July 2021 | Return | —N/a |
| Eduardo Zuma | (Brazil) | Leme (São Paulo (state)) | 26 September 1982 (aged 39) | Staff | 15 August 2021 | Interim (Note: Interim for the match against Fortaleza as Diniz was suspended) | 1 | 0 | 1 | 0 | 0.00 | 15 August 2021 | Return | —N/a |
| Fábio Carille | (Brazil) | São Paulo (São Paulo (state)) | 26 September 1973 (aged 48) | Free agent | 8 September 2021 | Permanent | 20 | 7 | 7 | 6 | 35.00 | | | 31 December 2022 |

== Transfers ==
=== Transfers in ===
| N. | Pos. | Name | Age | Moving from | Type | Fee | Source |
|---|---|---|---|---|---|---|---|
| — | CB | (Brazil) Cléber Reis | 30 | Ponte Preta | Loan return | Free | |
| — | ST | (Brazil) Rodrigão | 27 | Avaí | Loan return | Free | |
| — | AM | (Brazil) Rafael Longuine | 30 | CRB | Loan return | Free | |
| — | AM | (Brazil) Alexandre Tam | 21 | Confiança | Loan return | Free | |
| 40 | AM | (Brazil) Anderson Ceará | 21 | CRB | Loan return | Free | |
| 35 | CB | (Brazil) Sabino | 24 | Coritiba | Loan return | Free | |
| — | ST | (Brazil) Felippe Cardoso | 22 | Fluminense | Loan return | Free | |
| 49 | SS | (Brazil) Lucas Venuto | 26 | Sport Recife | Loan return | Free | |
| 29 | DM | (Brazil) Camacho | 31 | Corinthians | Transfer | Free | |
| 14 | CB | (Brazil) Wagner Leonardo | 21 | Náutico | Loan return | Free | |
| 47 | AM | (Brazil) Luizinho | 22 | Coritiba | Transfer | Free | |
| 9 | ST | (Brazil) Léo Baptistão | 29 | Wuhan Zali (China) | Transfer | Free | |
| 99 | ST | (Brazil) Diego Tardelli | 36 | Free agent | Transfer | Free | |
| 93 | GK | (Brazil) Jandrei | 28 | Genoa (Italy) | Transfer | Free | |
| 61 | CB | (Uruguay) Emiliano Velázquez | 27 | Rayo Vallecano (Spain) | Transfer | Free | |

=== Loans in ===
| N. | Pos. | Name | Age | Loaned from | Loan expires | Fee | Source |
|---|---|---|---|---|---|---|---|
| 42 | LB | (Brazil) Moraes | 23 | Atlético Goianiense | April 2022 | Free | |
| 23 | RW | (Brazil) Marcos Guilherme | 25 | Internacional | June 2022 | Free | |
| 22 | CB | (Brazil) Danilo Boza | 23 | Mirassol | December 2021 | Free | |
| 25 | MF | (Brazil) Vinicius Zanocelo | 20 | Ferroviária | May 2023 | Free | |
| 37 | MF | (Venezuela) Lacava | 19 | Academia Puerto Cabello (Venezuela) | December 2022 | Free | |
| 18 | MF | (Brazil) Augusto | 22 | Real Madrid (Spain) | June 2022 | Free | |

=== Transfers out ===
| N. | Pos. | Name | Age | Moving to | Type | Fee | Source |
|---|---|---|---|---|---|---|---|
| 6 | CB | (Brazil) Laércio | 26 | Chapecoense | Contract terminated | Free | |
| 35 | CB | (Brazil) Sabino | 24 | Sport Recife | Contract terminated | Free | |
| 10 | FW | (Venezuela) Yeferson Soteldo | 23 | Toronto FC (Canada) | Transfer | R$ 32M | |
| 16 | FW | (Colombia) Jonathan Copete | 33 | Avaí | End of contract | Free | |
| 1 | GK | (Brazil) Vladimir | 31 | Free agent | Contract terminated | Free | |
| 14 | CB | (Brazil) Luan Peres | 26 | Olympique (France) | Transfer | R$ 28M | |
| 9 | ST | (Brazil) Kaio Jorge | 19 | Juventus (Italy) | Transfer | R$ 18.5M | |
| — | AM | (Brazil) Rafael Longuine | 31 | Operário Ferroviário | Contract terminated | Free | |
| — | FW | (Brazil) Arthur Gomes | 23 | Estoril (Portugal) | Transfer | Free | |
| 5 | DM | (Brazil) Alison | 28 | Al-Hazem (Saudi Arabia) | Transfer | R$ 4.2M | |

=== Loans out ===
| N. | P | Name | Age | Loaned to | Loan expires | Source |
|---|---|---|---|---|---|---|
| — | SS | (Brazil) Matheus Moraes | 20 | Maringá | April 2021 | |
| — | LB | (Brazil) Romário | 28 | Coritiba | December 2021 | |
| 39 | SS | (Brazil) Tailson | 22 | Coritiba | December 2021 | |
| 23 | SS | (Brazil) Arthur Gomes | 22 | Atlético Goianiense | December 2021 | |
| — | ST | (Brazil) Felippe Cardoso | 22 | Vegalta Sendai (Japan) | December 2021 | |
| 42 | CB/LB | (Brazil) Wagner Leonardo | 21 | Náutico | December 2021 | |
| — | RB | (Brazil) Fernando Pileggi | 21 | Santa Cruz | December 2021 | |
| — | ST | (Brazil) Rodrigão | 27 | Ponte Preta | May 2022 | |
| 29 | SS | (Brazil) Allanzinho | 21 | Guarani | December 2021 | |
| 18 | DM | (Brazil) Guilherme Nunes | 22 | Náutico | December 2021 | |
| 37 | AM | (Brazil) Lucas Lourenço | 20 | Londrina | December 2021 | |
| 44 | CB | (Brazil) Alex | 22 | Famalicão (Portugal) | June 2022 | |

== Competitions ==
=== Overview ===
| Competition | First match | Last match | Starting round | Final position | Record | | | | | | | |
| Competition | First match | Last match | Starting round | Final position | Pld | W | D | L | GF | GA | GD | Win % |
|---|---|---|---|---|---|---|---|---|---|---|---|---|
| Série A | 29 May 2021 | 9 December 2021 | Matchday 1 | 10th | 38 | 12 | 14 | 12 | 35 | 40 | −5 | 31.58 |
| Copa do Brasil | 1 June 2021 | 14 September 2021 | Third round | Quarter-finals | 6 | 3 | 0 | 3 | 7 | 4 | +3 | 50.00 |
| Campeonato Paulista | 28 February 2021 | 9 May 2021 | Matchday 1 | Group stage | 12 | 3 | 4 | 5 | 12 | 19 | −7 | 25.00 |
| Copa Libertadores | 9 March 2021 | 26 May 2021 | Second round | Group stage | 10 | 4 | 2 | 4 | 16 | 14 | +2 | 40.00 |
| Copa Sudamericana | 15 July 2021 | 19 August 2021 | Round of 16 | Quarter-finals | 4 | 2 | 1 | 1 | 4 | 3 | +1 | 50.00 |
| Total | | | | | 70 | 24 | 21 | 25 | 74 | 80 | −6 | 34.29 |

Source: Competitions

=== Campeonato Paulista ===
==== Results summary ====
| Overall | | | | | | | | Home | | | | | | Away | | | | | |
| Pld | W | D | L | GF | GA | GD | Pts | W | D | L | GF | GA | GD | W | D | L | GF | GA | GD |
|---|---|---|---|---|---|---|---|---|---|---|---|---|---|---|---|---|---|---|---|
| 12 | 3 | 4 | 5 | 12 | 19 | −7 | 13 | 3 | 2 | 1 | 7 | 5 | +2 | 0 | 2 | 4 | 5 | 14 | −9 |

Last updated: 9 May 2021.
Source: Globo Esporte

==== Group stage ====
| Pos | Team | Pld | W | D | L | GF | GA | GD | Pts | Qualification or relegation |
|---|---|---|---|---|---|---|---|---|---|---|
| 1 | Mirassol | 12 | 5 | 3 | 4 | 15 | 15 | 0 | 18 | Knockout stage |
| 2 | Guarani | 12 | 4 | 2 | 6 | 11 | 16 | −5 | 14 | Knockout stage |
| 3 | Santos | 12 | 3 | 4 | 5 | 12 | 19 | −7 | 13 | |
| 4 | São Caetano (R) | 12 | 0 | 3 | 9 | 4 | 22 | −18 | 3 | Relegation to Série A2 |

Source: Soccerway
(R) Relegated

==== Matches ====
| 28 February 1 | Santo André | 2–2 | Santos | São Paulo |
| 19:00 UTC-03:00 | Vitinho 3'; Ramon 51'; Léo Costa (yellow card) 82'; Rone (yellow card) 90+7' | Report | 5' Jean Mota; 25' Gabriel Pirani; (yellow card) 69' Kevin Malthus; (yellow card) 85' Sandro Perpétuo | Stadium: Canindé; Attendance: 0 Referee: Douglas Marques das Flores |

| 3 March 2 | Santos | 1–1 | Ferroviária | Santos |
| 17:00 UTC-03:00 | Sabino 30'; Vinicius Balieiro (yellow card) 45+1'; Tailson (yellow card) 56' | Report | (yellow card) 30' Vinicius Zanocelo; (yellow card) 34' Bruno Mezenga; 66' Felipe Marques | Stadium: Vila Belmiro; Attendance: 0 Referee: Raphael Claus |

| 6 March 3 | São Paulo | 4–0 | Santos | São Paulo |
| 19:00 UTC-03:00 | Gabriel Sara 50'; Pablo (yellow card) 53', (goal) 76'; Luan Peres 74' (o.g.); Tchê Tchê 87' | Report | (yellow card) 74' Soteldo | Stadium: Morumbi; Attendance: 0 Referee: Luiz Flávio de Oliveira |

| 13 March 4 | Santos | 2–1 | Ituano | Santos |
| 19:00 UTC-03:00 | Lucas Braga 14'; Marcos Leonardo (yellow card) 25'; Vinicius Balieiro 33'; Soteldo (yellow card) 72'; Pará (yellow card) 90+5' | Report | 16' Branquinho | Stadium: Vila Belmiro; Attendance: 0 Referee: Salim Fende Chavez |

| 10 April 9 | Santos | 0–0 | Botafogo–SP | Santos |
| 22:00 UTC-03:00 | Luiz Felipe (yellow card) 45+1' | Report | (yellow card) 71' Victor Ramos; (yellow card) 85' John Everson | Stadium: Vila Belmiro; Attendance: 0 Referee: Adriano de Assis Miranda |

| 16 April 5 | Ponte Preta | 3–0 | Santos | Campinas |
| 20:00 UTC-03:00 | João Veras 74', 33'; Moisés 35'; Yuri (yellow card) 76' | Report | (yellow card) 37' Vinicius Balieiro; (yellow card) 75' Marcos Leonardo; (yellow card) 81' Kevin Malthus | Stadium: Moisés Lucarelli; Attendance: 0 Referee: Flávio Rodrigues de Souza |

| 18 April 6 | Santos | 2–1 | Internacional | Santos |
| 20:00 UTC-03:00 | Elacio Córdoba 17' (o.g.); Lucas Barbosa (yellow card) 31'; Lucas Lourenço (yellow card) 42'; Guilherme Nunes (red card) 61'; Alex (yellow card) 69'; Bruno Marques 87' | Report | 29' Lucas Batatinha; (yellow card) 42' Rondinelly; (yellow card) 46' Thalisson Kelven; (yellow card) 48' Deivid Willian | Stadium: Vila Belmiro; Attendance: 0 Referee: Vinícius Gonçalves Dias Araújo |

| 23 April 7 | Novorizontino | 1–0 | Santos | Novo Horizonte |
| 22:15 UTC-03:00 | Jenison 49'; Murilo Rangel (yellow card) 72' | Report | (yellow card) 31' Felipe Jonatan; (yellow card) 61' Renyer; (yellow card) 65' Luan Peres | Stadium: Jorge Ismael de Biasi; Attendance: 0 Referee: Thiago Luis Scarascatti |

| 25 April 8 | Santos | 0–2 | Corinthians | Santos |
| 20:00 UTC-03:00 | Wellington Tim (yellow card) 34' (yellow-red card) 43' | Report | (yellow card) 18' Gabriel; 38' Raul Gustavo; 45' Lucas Piton | Stadium: Vila Belmiro; Attendance: 0 Referee: Salim Fende Chaves |

| 1 May 10 | Red Bull Bragantino | 1–1 | Santos | Bragança Paulista |
| 20:00 UTC-03:00 | Ricardo Ryller (yellow card) 18'; Claudinho 38'; Tomás Cuello (yellow card) 78'; Aderlan (yellow card) 86' | Report | 47', (yellow card) 52' Lucas Braga; (yellow card) 71' Pará | Stadium: Nabi Abi Chedid; Attendance: 0 Referee: Douglas Marques das Flores |

| 6 May 11 | Palmeiras | 3–2 | Santos | São Paulo |
| 21:00 UTC-03:00 | Matías Viña 8'; Willian 23'; Zé Rafael (yellow card) 37'; Alan Empereur (yellow card) 53'; Lucas Esteves 78' | Report | 14', 53' (pen.) Kaio Jorge; (yellow card) 60' Gabriel Pirani; (yellow card) 63' Jean Mota; (yellow card) 80' Lucas Braga; (yellow card) 82' Kaiky Fernandes | Stadium: Allianz Parque; Attendance: 0 Referee: Luiz Flávio de Oliveira |

| 9 May 12 | Santos | 2–0 | São Bento | Santos |
| 16:00 UTC-03:00 | Lucas Lourenço (yellow card) 6'; Lucas Braga 41'; Kaio Jorge 45+2'; Pará (yellow card) 61' | Report | | Stadium: Vila Belmiro; Attendance: 0 Referee: Raphael Claus |

=== Copa Libertadores ===
==== Qualifying stages ====
===== Second stage =====
| 9 March 1st Leg | Santos (Brazil) | 2–1 | (Venezuela) Deportivo Lara | Santos, Brazil |
| 19:15 UTC−03:00 | Alison (yellow card) 33'; Vinicius Balieiro 50', (yellow card) 90+6'; Kaiky 69' | Report | (yellow card) 39', (goal) 52' Anzola; (yellow card) 80' Gómez; (yellow card) 90+6' Castillo | Stadium: Vila Belmiro; Attendance: 0 Referee: (Uruguay) Andrés Matonte |

| 16 March 2nd Leg | Deportivo Lara (Venezuela) | 1–1 (2–3 agg.) | (Brazil) Santos | Caracas, Venezuela |
| 18:15 UTC−04:00 | Meleán (yellow card) 55'; Anzola (yellow card) 57', (goal) 61' | Report | 36' Soteldo; (yellow card) 62' Jean Mota; (yellow card) 65' Sandry | Stadium: Olímpico; Attendance: 0 Referee: (Peru) Victor Carrillo |

===== Third stage =====
| 6 April 1st Leg | San Lorenzo (Argentina) | 1–3 | (Brazil) Santos | Buenos Aires, Argentina |
| 21:30 UTC−03:00 | Diego Rodríguez (yellow card) 37'; Ángel Romero 72' | Report | 7' Lucas Braga; 45+1' (pen.) Marinho; 90+4' Ângelo Gabriel | Stadium: Estadio Pedro Bidegain; Attendance: 0 Referee: (Colombia) Wilmar Roldán |

| 13 April 2nd Leg | Santos (Brazil) | 2–2 (5–3 agg.) | (Argentina) San Lorenzo | Brasília, Brazil |
| 21:30 UTC−03:00 | Alison (yellow card) 20'; Marcos Leonardo 22', (yellow card) 22'; João Paulo (yellow card) 45'; Luan Peres (yellow card) 50'; Pará 57'; Marinho (yellow card) 63' | Report | (yellow card) 3' Gino Peruzzi; (yellow card) 24', (goal) 59' Franco Di Santo; (red card) 51' Gabriel Rojas; (yellow card) 64' Diego Rodríguez; 78' Ángel Romero | Stadium: Estádio Nacional Mané Garrincha; Attendance: 0 Referee: (Uruguay) Esteban Ostojich |

==== Group stage ====
| Pos | Team | Pld | W | D | L | GF | GA | GD | Pts | Qualification |
|---|---|---|---|---|---|---|---|---|---|---|
| 1 | (Ecuador) Barcelona | 6 | 4 | 1 | 1 | 10 | 3 | +7 | 13 | Round of 16 |
| 2 | (Argentina) Boca Juniors | 6 | 3 | 1 | 2 | 6 | 2 | +4 | 10 | Round of 16 |
| 3 | (Brazil) Santos | 6 | 2 | 0 | 4 | 8 | 9 | −1 | 6 | Copa Sudamericana |
| 4 | (Bolivia) The Strongest | 6 | 2 | 0 | 4 | 4 | 14 | −10 | 6 | |

Source: CONMEBOL

| 20 April 1 | Santos (Brazil) | 0–2 | (Ecuador) Barcelona | Santos, Brazil |
| 19:15 UTC−03:00 | Yeferson Soteldo (yellow card) 64' | Report | (yellow card) 8' Williams Riveros; (yellow card) 27' Emmanuel Martínez; (yellow card) 41' Mario Pineida; 53' Carlos Garcés; 69' (o.g.) Pará; (yellow card) 78' Victor Mendoza | Stadium: Vila Belmiro; Attendance: 0 Referee: (Uruguay) Andrés Matonte |

| 27 April 2 | Boca Juniors (Argentina) | 2–0 | (Brazil) Santos | Buenos Aires, Argentina |
| 21:30 UTC−03:00 | Carlos Tevez 47'; Agustín Sández (yellow card) 56'; Cristian Pavón (yellow card) 60'; Sebastián Villa 69'; Cristian Medina (yellow card) 73' | Report | (yellow card) 35' Vinicius Balieiro; (yellow card) 40' Pará; (yellow card) 58' Marcos Leonardo; (yellow card) 74' Alison | Stadium: La Bombonera; Attendance: 0 Referee: (Venezuela) Jesús Valenzuela Sáez |

| 4 May 3 | Santos (Brazil) | 5–0 | (Bolivia) The Strongest | Santos, Brazil |
| 19:15 UTC−03:00 | Marinho 1'; Gabriel Pirani 26'; Vinicius Balieiro 43'; Kaiky Fernandes (yellow card) 51'; Lucas Braga 59'; Kevin Malthus 83' | Report | (yellow card) 13' Arrascaita; (yellow card) 82' Diego Wayar | Stadium: Vila Belmiro; Attendance: 0 Referee: (Chile) Cristián Garay |

| 11 May 4 | Santos (Brazil) | 1–0 | (Argentina) Boca Juniors | Santos, Brazil |
| 19:15 UTC−03:00 | Ângelo Gabriel (yellow card) 29'; Jean Mota (yellow card) 34'; Felipe Jonatan 41'; Lucas Braga (yellow card) 67'; Kaio Jorge (yellow card) 72' | Report | (yellow card) 32' Sebastián Villa; (yellow card) 61' Julio Buffarini | Stadium: Vila Belmiro; Attendance: 0 Referee: (Uruguay) Christian Ferreyra |

| 18 May 5 | The Strongest (Bolivia) | 2–1 | (Brazil) Santos | La Paz, Bolivia |
| 18:15 UTC−04:00 | Jair Reinoso 16'; Gonzalo Castillo (yellow card) 17' (yellow-red card) 24'; Willie 23'; Matheo Zoch (red card) 68'; Gabriel Valverde (yellow card) 73' | Report | (yellow card) 26' Jean Mota; (yellow card) 51' Kaio Jorge; (yellow card) 60' Jonathan Copete; (yellow card) 62', (goal) 64' Felipe Jonatan; (red card) 90+8' Alison | Stadium: Estadio Hernando Siles; Attendance: 0 Referee: (Peru) Diego Sueldo |

| 26 May 6 | Barcelona (Ecuador) | 3–1 | (Brazil) Santos | Guayaquil, Ecuador |
| 19:00 UTC−05:00 | Damián Díaz 15', 54'; Byron Castillo (yellow card) 32'; Michael Carcelén (yellow card) 35'; Jean Montaño 77' | Report | 45+2', (yellow card) 80' Kaio Jorge; (yellow card) 55' Kaiky Fernandes; (yellow card) 86' Lucas Lourenço | Stadium: Estadio Monumental Banco Pichincha; Attendance: 0 Referee: (Colombia) Andrés Rojas |

=== Copa Sudamericana ===
The draw for the final stage was held on 1 June 2021.

==== Round of 16 ====
| 15 July First leg | Santos (Brazil) | 1–0 | (Argentina) Independiente | Santos, Brazil |
| 19:15 UTC−3 | Kaiky Fernandes (yellow card) 66'; Kaio Jorge 69'; Carlos Sanchez (yellow card) 90+4' | Report | (yellow card) 39' Lucas Rodríguez; (yellow card) 80' Juan Manuel Insaurralde; (yellow card) 85' Lucas González | Stadium: Vila Belmiro; Attendance: 0 Referee: (Colombia) Wilmar Roldán |

| 22 July Second leg | Independiente (Argentina) | 1–1 (1–2 agg.) | (Brazil) Santos | Avellaneda, Argentina |
| 19:15 UTC−3 | Domingo Blanco (yellow card) 28'; Lucas Romero (yellow card) 35'; Sergio Barreto (yellow card) 44' (yellow-red card) 90+7'; Juan Manuel Insaurralde (red card) 62'; Lucas González 68' | Report | (yellow card) 17' Jean Mota; 38' Kaio Jorge; (yellow card) 77' Kaiky Fernandes | Stadium: Estadio Libertadores de América; Attendance: 0 Referee: (Peru) Diego Haro |

==== Quarter-finals ====
| 12 August First leg | Santos (Brazil) | 2–1 | (Paraguay) Libertad | Santos, Brazil |
| 21:30 UTC−3 | Carlos Sanchez 43' (pen.); Felipe Jonatan (yellow card) 51'; Kaiky (red card) 57'; Wagner Leonardo (yellow card) 65'; Alexander Barboza 90+3' (o.g.) | Report | (yellow card) 45' Héctor Villalba; 59' Daniel Bocanegra; (yellow card) 82' Leonel Vangioni | Stadium: Vila Belmiro; Attendance: 0 Referee: (Uruguay) Leodán González |

| 19 August Second leg | Libertad (Paraguay) | 1–0 (2a–2 agg.) | (Brazil) Santos | Asunción, Paraguay |
| 21:30 UTC−3 | Sebastián Ferreira 14'; Leonel Vangioni (yellow card) 23'; Alexander Barboza (yellow card) 37'; Daniel Bocanegra (yellow card) 83'; Hugo Martínez (yellow card) 90' | Report | (yellow card) 66', (red card) 90+5' Marcos Leonardo; (yellow card) 68' Luiz Felipe; (yellow card) 73' Marcos Guilherme; (yellow card) 90+1' João Paulo | Stadium: Estadio Defensores del Chaco; Attendance: 0 Referee: (Venezuela) Alexis Herrera |

=== Campeonato Brasileiro ===
==== Results summary ====
| Overall | | | | | | | | Home | | | | | | Away | | | | | |
| Pld | W | D | L | GF | GA | GD | Pts | W | D | L | GF | GA | GD | W | D | L | GF | GA | GD |
|---|---|---|---|---|---|---|---|---|---|---|---|---|---|---|---|---|---|---|---|
| 38 | 12 | 14 | 12 | 35 | 40 | −5 | 50 | 9 | 6 | 4 | 21 | 14 | +7 | 3 | 8 | 8 | 14 | 26 | −12 |

Source: Soccerway

==== Results by round ====
| Round | 1 | 2 | 3 | 4 | 5 | 6 | 7 | 8 | 9 | 10 | 11 | 12 | 13 | 14 | 15 | 16 | 17 | 18 | 19 | 20 | 21 | 22 | 23 | 24 | 25 | 26 | 27 | 28 | 29 | 30 | 31 | 32 | 33 | 34 | 35 | 36 | 37 | 38 |
|---|---|---|---|---|---|---|---|---|---|---|---|---|---|---|---|---|---|---|---|---|---|---|---|---|---|---|---|---|---|---|---|---|---|---|---|---|---|---|
| Ground | A | H | H | A | H | A | H | H | A | H | A | A | H | A | H | A | H | H | A | H | A | A | H | A | H | A | A | H | A | H | H | A | H | A | H | A | A | H |
| Result | L | W | D | L | W | D | W | D | L | W | L | D | L | W | D | D | D | L | L | D | D | L | W | D | W | L | D | L | W | L | W | D | W | L | W | D | W | D |
| Position | 20 | 12 | 12 | 13 | 9 | 10 | 6 | 7 | 11 | 7 | 9 | 10 | 12 | 8 | 8 | 10 | 11 | 12 | 13 | 13 | 14 | 16 | 16 | 16 | 16 | 16 | 15 | 17 | 14 | 16 | 13 | 12 | 11 | 13 | 11 | 12 | 11 | 10 |

Source: Globo Esporte
P = Postponed

==== League table ====
| Pos | Team | Pld | W | D | L | GF | GA | GD | Pts | Qualification or relegation |
|---|---|---|---|---|---|---|---|---|---|---|
| 8 | América Mineiro | 38 | 13 | 14 | 11 | 41 | 37 | +4 | 53 | Qualification for Copa Libertadores second stage |
| 9 | Atlético Goianiense | 38 | 13 | 14 | 11 | 33 | 36 | −3 | 53 | Qualification for Copa Sudamericana group stage |
| 10 | Santos | 38 | 12 | 14 | 12 | 35 | 40 | −5 | 50 | Qualification for Copa Sudamericana group stage |
| 11 | Ceará | 38 | 11 | 17 | 10 | 39 | 38 | +1 | 50 | Qualification for Copa Sudamericana group stage |
| 12 | Internacional | 38 | 12 | 12 | 14 | 44 | 42 | +2 | 48 | Qualification for Copa Sudamericana group stage |

Source: CBF
Rules for classification: 1) points; 2) wins; 3) goal difference; 4) goals scored; 5) head-to-head results (only between two teams); 6) fewest red cards; 7) fewest yellow cards; 8) drawing of lots.

==== Matches ====
| 29 May 1 | Bahia | 3–0 | Santos | Salvador |
| 20:00 UTC-03:00 | Patrick de Lucca (yellow card) 42'; Thaciano 46', 49'; Juninho 53'; Matheus Bahia (yellow card) 62'; Rossi (yellow card) 86' | Report | (yellow card) 3' Marinho; (yellow card) 71' Alison; (yellow card) 76' Luan Peres | Stadium: Estádio de Pituaçu; Attendance: 0 Referee: Bruno Arleu de Araújo |

| 5 June 2 | Santos | 3–1 | Ceará | Santos |
| 21:00 UTC-03:00 | Jean Mota 19'; Pará (yellow card) 40'; Alison (yellow card) 44'; Luan Peres (yellow card) 52'; Marinho (penalty missed) 8', 63'; Kaio Jorge 72' | Report | (yellow card) 45+1' Gabriel Lacerda; 45+7' (pen.) Vina | Stadium: Vila Belmiro; Attendance: 0 Referee: Jean Pierre Gonçalves Lima |

| 12 June 3 | Santos | 0–0 | Juventude | Santos |
| 19:00 UTC-03:00 | Jean Mota (yellow card) 24'; Luan Peres (yellow card) 40' | Report | (yellow card) 23' Elton; (yellow card) 52' Guilherme Castilho; (yellow card) 87' Capixaba | Stadium: Vila Belmiro; Attendance: 0 Referee: Alexandre Vargas Tavares de Jesus |

| 17 June 4 | Fluminense | 1–0 | Santos | Rio de Janeiro |
| 19:00 UTC-03:00 | Nenê 51'; Caio Paulista (yellow card) 62'; Yago Felipe (yellow card) 69'; Kayky (yellow card) 82'; Abel Hernández (yellow card) 90+5' | Report | (yellow card) 15' Madson; (yellow card) 33' Alison; (yellow card) 62' Lucas Braga | Stadium: Maracanã; Attendance: 0 Referee: Paulo Roberto Alves Júnior |

| 20 June 5 | Santos | 2–0 | São Paulo | Santos |
| 18:15 UTC-03:00 | Marinho 27'; Gabriel Pirani 44'; Kaio Jorge (yellow card) 45+2'; Vinicius Zanocelo (yellow card) 90+6' | Report | (yellow card) 49' Reinaldo; (yellow card) 61' Gabriel Sara; (yellow card) 85' Igor Vinícius; (yellow card) 90+10' Martín Benítez | Stadium: Vila Belmiro; Attendance: 0 Referee: Sávio Pereira |

| 24 June 6 | Grêmio | 2–2 | Santos | Porto Alegre |
| 21:30 UTC-03:00 | Diego Souza 4', (yellow card) 22'; Matheus Henrique 42'; Ferreira (yellow card) 68' | Report | 29' Marcos Guilherme; (yellow card) 48' Camacho; (yellow card) 56' Jean Mota; 78', (yellow card) 90+6' Marinho | Stadium: Arena do Grêmio; Attendance: 0 Referee: Caio Max Augusto Vieira |

| 27 June 7 | Santos | 2–0 | Atlético Mineiro | Santos |
| 20:30 UTC-03:00 | Jean Mota 57'; Marinho (yellow card) 67'; Pará (yellow card) 79'; João Paulo (yellow card) 90'; Marcos Guilherme 90+4', (yellow card) 90+4' | Report | (yellow card) 60' (yellow-red card) Allan; (yellow card) 68' Guilherme Arana; (yellow card) 90+1' Matías Zaracho; (yellow card) 90+10' Martín Benítez | Stadium: Vila Belmiro; Attendance: 0 Referee: Bruno Arleu de Araújo |

| 30 June 8 | Santos | 0–0 | Sport | Santos |
| 20:30 UTC-03:00 | Luiz Felipe (yellow card) 35' | Report | (yellow card) 22' André; (yellow card) 33' Neilton; (yellow card) 55' Sabino; (yellow card) 90+4' Santiago Tréllez | Stadium: Vila Belmiro; Attendance: 0 Referee: Douglas Schwengber da Silva |

| 3 July 9 | América Mineiro | 2–0 | Santos | Belo Horizonte |
| 19:00 UTC-03:00 | Eduardo (yellow card) 43'; Zé Ricardo (yellow card) 45+2'; João Paulo 55'; Ribamar (yellow card) 72'; Carlos Alberto (yellow card) 89', (goal) 90+4' | Report | (yellow card) 38' Pará; (yellow card) 44' Lucas Braga; (yellow card) 67' Luiz Felipe | Stadium: Estádio Independência; Attendance: 0 Referee: Denis Ribeiro Serafim |

| 6 July 10 | Santos | 2–1 | Athletico Paranaense | Santos |
| 19:30 UTC-03:00 | Kaiky Fernandes (yellow card) 25'; Marcos Guilherme 31'; Luiz Felipe (yellow card) 48'; Zé Ivaldo 50' (o.g.) | Report | 45+1' Fernando Canesin; (yellow card) 63' Thiago Heleno; (yellow card) 86' Renato Kayzer | Stadium: Vila Belmiro; Attendance: 0 Referee: Vinícius Gomes do Amaral |

| 10 July 11 | Palmeiras | 3–2 | Santos | São Paulo |
| 16:30 UTC-03:00 | Gustavo Gómez 19'; Breno Lopes 22'; Jailson (yellow card) 77'; Willian 83' | Report | (yellow card) 15' Jean Mota; (yellow card) 42' Camacho; 69' (pen.) Carlos Sánchez; (yellow card) 82', (goal) 90+2' (pen.) Marinho; (yellow card) 87' Kaiky Fernandes; (yellow card) 90+3' Moraes; (yellow card) 90+7' Marcos Guilherme | Stadium: Allianz Parque; Attendance: 0 Referee: Bráulio da Silva Machado |

| 18 July 12 | Red Bull Bragantino | 2–2 | Santos | Bragança Paulista |
| 20:30 UTC-03:00 | Alerrandro 10'; Tomás Cuello (yellow card) 45'; Weverson (yellow card) 47'; Léo Ortiz (yellow card) 62'; Ytalo 83' | Report | (yellow card) 31' Marinho; (yellow card) 60' Felipe Jonatan; (yellow card) 66' Luiz Felipe; 70' Marcos Guilherme; (yellow card) 74' Carlos Sánchez; (yellow card) 87' Vinicius Zanocelo; 90+5', (yellow card) 90+6' Marcos Leonardo | Stadium: Nabi Abi Chedid; Attendance: 0 Referee: Luiz Flávio de Oliveira |

| 25 July 13 | Santos | 0–1 | Atlético Goianiense | Santos |
| 18:15 UTC-03:00 | João Paulo (yellow card) 18'; Marinho (yellow card) 45+2' | Report | 20' (pen.), (yellow card) 36' Zé Roberto; Fernando Miguel (yellow card) 73' | Stadium: Vila Belmiro; Attendance: 0 Referee: Leandro Vuaden |

| 1 August 14 | Chapecoense | 0–1 | Santos | Chapecó |
| 18:15 UTC-03:00 | | Report | 43' (pen.) Carlos Sánchez | Stadium: Arena Condá; Attendance: 0 Referee: Rodolpho Toski Marques |

| 8 August 15 | Santos | 0–0 | Corinthians | Santos |
| 16:00 UTC-03:00 | Jean Mota (yellow card) 86' | Report | (yellow card) 89' Roni | Stadium: Vila Belmiro; Attendance: 0 Referee: Flávio Rodrigues de Souza |

| 15 August 16 | Fortaleza | 1–1 | Santos | Fortaleza |
| 18:15 UTC-03:00 | Lucas Crispim 23', (penalty missed) 90+3'; Robson (yellow card) 36'; Yago Pikachu (yellow card) 65' | Report | 25' Carlos Sánchez; (yellow card) 90+8' Marcos Guilherme | Stadium: Castelão; Attendance: 0 Referee: André Castro |

| 22 August 17 | Santos | 2–2 | Internacional | Santos |
| 18:15 UTC-03:00 | Gabriel Pirani 24'; Madson 35'; Wagner Leonardo (yellow card) 48' | Report | 8', (yellow card) 55' Gabriel Mercado; (yellow card) 39' Rodrigo Lindoso; 88' Yuri Alberto | Stadium: Vila Belmiro; Attendance: 0 Referee: Wagner do Nascimento Magalhães |

| 28 August 18 | Santos | 0–4 | Flamengo | Santos |
| 19:00 UTC-03:00 | Carlos Sánchez (yellow card) 5'; Robson Reis (yellow card) 33'; Felipe Jonatan (yellow card) 76'; Jean Mota (yellow card) 77' | Report | (yellow card) 7' Mauricio Isla; (yellow card) 30' Diego; (yellow card) 37' Bruno Viana; 52' (pen.), 71', 80' Gabriel Barbosa; (yellow card) 54' Gustavo Henrique; 84' Andreas Pereira | Stadium: Vila Belmiro; Attendance: 0 Referee: Bráulio da Silva Machado |

| 4 September 19 | Cuiabá | 2–1 | Santos | Cuiabá |
| 21:00 UTC-03:00 | Jonathan Cafu 4'; Camilo (yellow card) 28'; Yuri (yellow card) 78'; Élton 88', (yellow card) 89' | Report | 64' Gabriel Pirani; (yellow card) 75' Marcos Guilherme | Stadium: Arena Pantanal; Attendance: 0 Referee: Bruno Arleu de Araújo |

| 11 September 20 | Santos | 0–0 | Bahia | Santos |
| 21:00 UTC-03:00 | Lucas Braga (yellow card) 78' | Report | (yellow card) 33' Eugenio Isnaldo; (yellow card) 63' Raniele; (yellow card) 75' Nino Paraíba; (yellow card) 89' Germán Conti | Stadium: Vila Belmiro; Attendance: 0 Referee: Paulo César Zanovelli |

| 18 September 21 | Ceará | 0–0 | Santos | Fortaleza |
| 21:00 UTC-03:00 | Kelvyn (yellow card) 19'; Messias (yellow card) 25'; Erick (yellow card) 90' | Report | (penalty missed) 27' Marinho; (yellow card) 35' Pará; (yellow card) 43' Camacho | Stadium: Castelão; Attendance: 0 Referee: Anderson Daronco |

| 26 September 22 | Juventude | 3–0 | Santos | Caxias do Sul |
| 16:00 UTC-03:00 | Ricardo Bueno 45+1'; William Matheus (yellow card) 50'; Vitor Mendes (yellow card) 53'; Sorriso (yellow card) 55'; Dawhan 64'; Guilherme Castilho 84' | Report | | Stadium: Estádio Alfredo Jaconi; Attendance: 0 Referee: Jefferson Ferreira de Moraes |

| 7 October 24 | São Paulo | 1–1 | Santos | São Paulo |
| 19:00 UTC-03:00 | Jonathan Calleri 35' (pen.); Welington (yellow card) 73' | Report | 5' Carlos Sánchez; (yellow card) 77' Vinicius Balieiro; (yellow card) 80' Marinho; (yellow card) 90+3' Danilo Boza | Stadium: Morumbi; Attendance: 5,529; Referee: Raphael Claus |

| 10 October 25 | Santos | 1–0 | Grêmio | Santos |
| 16:00 UTC-03:00 | Léo Baptistão (yellow card) 45+1'; Wagner Leonardo 90+2'; Felipe Jonatan (yellow card) 90+3'; Carlos Sánchez (yellow card) 90+6'; Diego Tardelli (yellow card) 90+6' | Report | (yellow card) 9' Rodrigues; (yellow card) 32' Thiago Santos; (yellow card) 45+2' Douglas Costa; (yellow card) 47' Walter Kannemann; (yellow card) 67' Lucas Silva; (yellow card) 72' (yellow-red card) 90+8' Rafinha | Stadium: Vila Belmiro; Attendance: 4,165; Referee: Bruno Arleu de Araújo |

| 13 October 26 | Atlético Mineiro | 3–1 | Santos | Belo Horizonte |
| 19:00 UTC-03:00 | Nacho Fernández 69' (pen.), 81', (penalty missed) 81'; Nathan Silva 75'; Dodô (yellow card) 84' | Report | 48', (yellow card) 50' Raniel; (yellow card) 68' Lucas Braga; (yellow card) 74' Wagner Leonardo; (yellow card) 74' Jean Mota; (yellow card) 76' Marinho | Stadium: Mineirão; Attendance: 16,514; Referee: Paulo Roberto Alves Júnior |

| 17 October 27 | Sport | 0–0 | Santos | São Lourenço da Mata |
| 20:30 UTC-03:00 | Sander (yellow card) 90+6' | Report | (yellow card) 10' Carlos Sánchez; (yellow card) 49' Wagner Leonardo; (yellow card) 80' Madson | Stadium: Arena Pernambuco; Attendance: 5,272; Referee: Anderson Daronco |

| 23 October 28 | Santos | 0–2 | América Mineiro | Santos |
| 17:00 UTC-03:00 | Jean Mota (red card) 45+1'; Camacho (yellow card) 90+1' | Report | (yellow card) 12' Juninho; 45+4' (pen.) Ademir; 47' Alê; (yellow card) 53' Marlon | Stadium: Vila Belmiro; Attendance: 6,921; Referee: Marcelo de Lima Henrique |
Note: Camacho was booked after being replaced

| 27 October 23 | Santos | 2–0 | Fluminense | Santos |
| 19:00 UTC-03:00 | Madson 33'; Vinicius Zanocelo (yellow card) 43'; Diego Tardelli 62'; Marinho (yellow card) 80' | Report | (yellow card) 43' John Kennedy; (yellow card) 81' Nonato | Stadium: Vila Belmiro; Attendance: 6,685; Referee: Bráulio da Silva Machado |

| 30 October 29 | Athletico Paranaense | 0–1 | Santos | Curitiba |
| 17:00 UTC-03:00 | Zé Ivaldo (yellow card) 68' | Report | 48' Madson; (yellow card) 67' João Paulo; (yellow card) 86' Vinicius Balieiro | Stadium: Arena da Baixada; Attendance: 6,666; Referee: Leandro Vuaden |

| 7 November 30 | Santos | 0–2 | Palmeiras | Santos |
| 16:00 UTC-03:00 | Raniel (yellow card) 3'; Madson (yellow card) 65'; Felipe Jonatan (yellow card) 78' | Report | (yellow card) 25' Gustavo Gómez; (yellow card) 31' Zé Rafael; 44' Rony; 72' Raphael Veiga | Stadium: Vila Belmiro; Attendance: 13,165; Referee: Raphael Claus |

| 10 November 31 | Santos | 2–0 | Red Bull Bragantino | Santos |
| 19:00 UTC-03:00 | Marinho 28'; Vinicius Zanocelo (yellow card) 72'; João Paulo (yellow card) 75'; Carlos Sánchez 90+3' (pen.) | Report | (yellow card) 21' Jadsom Silva | Stadium: Vila Belmiro; Attendance: 9,443; Referee: Leandro Vuaden |

| 13 November 32 | Atlético Goianiense | 0–0 | Santos | Goiânia |
| 17:00 UTC-03:00 | Wanderson (yellow card) 68'; André Luis (yellow card) 72' | Report | (yellow card) 23' Kaiky; (yellow card) 45+1' Danilo Boza; (yellow card) 56' Moraes | Stadium: Antônio Accioly; Attendance: 5,015; Referee: Felipe Fernandes de Lima |

| 17 November 33 | Santos | 2–0 | Chapecoense | Santos |
| 19:00 UTC-03:00 | Marinho 27' (pen.); Ângelo (yellow card) 45+5'; Marcos Guilherme 84' | Report | (yellow card) 25' Jordan; (yellow card) 29' Busanello | Stadium: Vila Belmiro; Attendance: 11,574; Referee: Paulo Cesar Zanovelli |

| 21 November 34 | Corinthians | 2–0 | Santos | São Paulo |
| 16:00 UTC-03:00 | Jô 47'; Roni (yellow card) 82'; Gabriel 85' | Report | | Stadium: Arena Corinthians; Attendance: 43,583; Referee: Leandro Vuaden |

| 25 November 35 | Santos | 2–0 | Fortaleza | Santos |
| 19:00 UTC-03:00 | Vinicius Zanocelo (yellow card) 39'; Marcos Leonardo 71' (pen.), 90', (yellow card) 72'; Marcos Guilherme (yellow card) 79' | Report | (yellow card) 21' Yago Pikachu; (yellow card) 38' Marcelo Benevenuto | Stadium: Vila Belmiro; Attendance: 11,313; Referee: Wagner do Nascimento Magalhães |

| 28 November 36 | Internacional | 1–1 | Santos | Porto Alegre |
| 19:00 UTC-03:00 | Johnny (yellow card) 36'; Luiz Felipe 45+1' (o.g.) | Report | (yellow card) 45+2' Pará; 47' Marcos Leonardo; (yellow card) 85' Sandry | Stadium: Beira-Rio; Attendance: 11,432; Referee: Bráulio da Silvas Macado |
Note: Pará was booked on the bench

| 6 November 37 | Flamengo | 0–1 | Santos | Rio de Janeiro |
| 20:00 UTC-03:00 | Pedro (yellow card) 31'; Matheuzinho (yellow card) 36'; Gabriel Barbosa (penalty missed) 68'; Rodinei (yellow card) 72' | Report | 57', (yellow card) 61' Marcos Leonardo; (yellow card) 65' Kaiky; (yellow card) 90+2' Raniel | Stadium: Maracanã; Attendance: 41,930; Referee: Anderson Daronco |

| 9 December 38 | Santos | 1–1 | Cuiabá | Santos |
| 21:30 UTC-03:00 | Vinicius Zanocelo (yellow card) 66'; Lucas Braga 75' | Report | 16' Marllon; (yellow card) 72' Walter; (yellow card) 81' Pepê | Stadium: Vila Belmiro; Attendance: 12,444; Referee: Wagner do Nascimento Magalhães |

=== Copa do Brasil ===
==== Third round ====
| 1 June First leg | Cianorte | 0–2 | Santos | Cianorte |
| 19:00 UTC−03:00 | Rael (yellow card) 33'; Zé Vitor (yellow card) 39'; Vitor Salvador (yellow card) 47' | Report | 24' Kaio Jorge; (yellow card) 61' Luiz Felipe; (yellow card) 65' Lucas Braga; 80' Marinho | Stadium: Estádio Olimpico Albino Turbay; Attendance: 0 Referee: Diego Pombo Lopez |

| 8 June Second leg | Santos | 1–0 (3–0 agg.) | Cianorte | Santos |
| 16:30 UTC−03:00 | Marinho (yellow card) 5'; Marcos Guilherme 26' | Report | (yellow card) 13' Michel; (yellow card) 22' Everton Morelli; (yellow card) 73' Eduardo Doma | Stadium: Vila Belmiro; Attendance: 0 Referee: Gilberto Rodrigues Castro Junior |

==== Round of 16 ====
| 28 July First leg | Santos | 4–0 | Juazeirense | Santos |
| 19:15 UTC−03:00 | Marinho (yellow card) 41'; Jean Mota (yellow card) 49'; Madson 72'; Lucas Braga 84'; Marcos Leonardo 90+2'; Carlos Sánchez 90+10' | Report | (yellow card) 37' Daniel Nazaré; (yellow card) 45+1' Toni Galego | Stadium: Vila Belmiro; Attendance: 0 Referee: Wagner do Nascimento Magalhães |

| 4 August Second leg | Juazeirense | 2–0 (2–4 agg.) | Santos | Juazeiro |
| 19:15 UTC−03:00 | Ian 25'; Thauan 28', (yellow card) 30'; Patrik (yellow card) 29'; Jamerson (yellow card) 58'; Júnior Timbó (yellow card) 75'; Waguinho (yellow card) 86'; Júnior Timbó (yellow card) 90+6' | Report | (yellow card) 61' Vinicius Zanocelo; (yellow card) 71' Marcos Leonardo; (yellow card) 88' Kaiky | Stadium: Estádio Adauto Moraes; Attendance: 0 Referee: Douglas Schwengber da Silva |

===== Quarter-finals =====
| 25 August First leg | Athletico Paranaense | 1–0 | Santos | Curitiba |
| 19:00 UTC−03:00 | Renato Kayzer 17'; Richard (yellow card) 34' | Report | (yellow card) 40' Wagner Leonardo | Stadium: Arena da Baixada; Attendance: 0 Referee: Marcelo de Lima Henrique |

| 14 September Second leg | Santos | 0–1 (0–2 agg.) | Athletico Paranaense | Santos |
| 21:30 UTC−03:00 | | Report | (yellow card) 47' Richard; (yellow card) 59' (yellow-red card) 83' Christian; (yellow card) 64' Erick; (yellow card) 74' Abner Vinícius; 79' Zé Ivaldo | Stadium: Vila Belmiro; Attendance: 0 Referee: Leandro Vuaden |
