= Luiz Henrique (footballer, born May 1999) =

Brazilian footballer

Personal information
- Full name: Luiz Henrique Augustin Schlocobier
- Date of birth: 3 May 1999 (age 27)
- Place of birth: Mafra, Brazil
- Height: 1.77 m (5 ft 10 in)
- Position: Midfielder

Team information
- Current team: São Joseense

Youth career
- 2008–2019: Coritiba

Senior career*
Years	Team	Apps	(Gls)
2019–2021	Coritiba	39	(1)
2021–2024	Santos	2	(0)
2022	→ Novorizontino (loan)	5	(0)
2023	→ Operário Ferroviário (loan)	7	(1)
2024	→ Ipatinga (loan)	5	(0)
2025–	São Joseense	0	(0)
- * Club domestic league appearances and goals as of 22:38, 14 December 2024 (UTC)

Luiz Henrique Augustin Schlocobier (born 3 May 1999), known as Luiz Henrique or sometimes as Luizinho, is a Brazilian professional footballer who plays as a midfielder for São Joseense.

== Club career ==
=== Coritiba ===
Born in Mafra, Santa Catarina, Luiz Henrique joined Coritiba's youth setup in 2008, aged nine. Promoted to the first team for the 2019 campaign, he made his senior debut on 23 January of that year, coming on as a late substitute for Kady in a 1–1 Campeonato Paranaense home draw against Maringá.

Luiz Henrique contributed with 18 appearances with the main squad in the campaign, as his side achieved promotion to the Série A. He made his debut in the category on 12 August 2020, replacing Matheus Galdezani in a 0–1 away loss against Bahia.

Luiz Henrique scored his first senior goal on 20 January 2021, netting the opener in a 3–3 home draw against Fluminense.

=== Santos ===
On 23 July 2021, Luiz Henrique moved to Santos. He made his club debut on 28 August, replacing Carlos Sánchez in a 0–4 home loss against Flamengo.

==== Loans ====
On 11 April 2022, Luiz Henrique was loaned to Série B side Novorizontino for one year. On 14 December, after featuring rarely, he moved to Operário Ferroviário also in a temporary deal.

Luiz Henrique again featured rarely for Operário in their promotion to the second division, and moved to Ipatinga on loan for the 2024 Campeonato Mineiro on 12 December 2023.

=== São Joseense ===
On 8 December 2024, Luiz Henrique signed for São Joseense.

== Career statistics ==
As of 12 November 2024

Club	Season	League			State League		Cup		Continental		Other		Total	
Club	Season	Division	Apps	Goals	Apps	Goals	Apps	Goals	Apps	Goals	Apps	Goals	Apps	Goals
Coritiba	2019	Série B	12	0	6	0	0	0	—		—		18	0
Coritiba	2020	Série A	15	1	1	0	0	0	—		—		16	1
Coritiba	2021	Série B	2	0	3	0	1	1	—		—		6	1
Coritiba	Total		29	1	10	0	1	1	—		—		40	2
Santos	2021	Série A	2	0	—		—		—		3 (Note: Appearance(s) in Copa Paulista)	1	5	1
Santos	2022	Série A	0	0	0	0	0	0	—		—		0	0
Santos	Total		2	0	0	0	0	0	—		3	1	5	1
Novorizontino (loan)	2022	Série B	5	0	—		—		—		—		5	0
Operário Ferroviário (loan)	2023	Série C	4	0	3	1	0	0	—		—		7	1
Ipatinga (loan)	2024	Série D	2	0	3	0	—		—		—		5	0
São Joseense	2025	Paranaense	—		0	0	—		—		—		0	0
Career total			42	1	16	1	1	1	0	0	3	1	62	4
