= Augusto Galvan =

Brazilian footballer (born 1999)

Personal information
- Full name: Augusto César Veríssimo Galvan
- Date of birth: 25 March 1999 (age 27)
- Place of birth: Ribeirão Preto, Brazil
- Height: 1.72 m (5 ft 8 in)
- Position: Attacking midfielder

Team information
- Current team: América de Natal

Youth career
- 2013–2017: São Paulo
- 2017–2018: Real Madrid

Senior career*
Years	Team	Apps	(Gls)
2018–2022	Real Madrid B	19	(0)
2019–2020	→ Cultural Leonesa (loan)	10	(1)
2020–2021	→ Las Rozas (loan)	15	(1)
2021–2022	→ Santos (loan)	0	(0)
2023	Azuriz	9	(1)
2023–2026	Caxias	22	(2)
2026-	América de Natal	-	(-)
- * Club domestic league appearances and goals as of 21:20, 25 January 2024 (UTC)

Augusto César Veríssimo Galvan (born 25 March 1999), known as Augusto Galvan or simply Augusto, is a Brazilian footballer who plays for América de Natal. Mainly an attacking midfielder, he can also play as a left winger.

== Club career ==
=== Early career ===
Born in Ribeirão Preto, São Paulo, Augusto joined São Paulo's youth setup in 2013. On 24 February 2017, as his contract was due to expire in March, he was sold to Real Madrid for a rumoured fee of €3 million. Prior to the transfer, he was separated from the under-17 squad after rejecting an offer of a professional contract.

=== Real Madrid ===
==== Castilla ====
After spending his first season in the Juvenil A squad, Augusto was promoted to Santiago Solari's reserves in Segunda División B for the 2018–19 campaign. He made his senior debut on 29 September 2018, coming on as a late substitute for Jaime Seoane in a 3–1 home win against CDA Navalcarnero.

Augusto contributed with 19 league appearances in his first senior season, being mainly used as a substitute as Castilla missed out promotion in the play-offs.

==== Loan to Cultural Leonesa ====
On 18 July 2019, Augusto joined fellow third division side Cultural y Deportiva Leonesa on loan for one year. He scored his first senior goal on 19 December, netting his team's second in a 3–0 home success over Las Rozas CF, for the season's Copa del Rey.

In February 2020, Augusto suffered a shoulder injury which kept him out for three months. He featured in ten matches for the side, as the season was curtailed due to the COVID-19 pandemic.

==== Loan to Las Rozas ====
On 2 October 2020, Augusto moved to Las Rozas also in the third tier, on loan for one year. While at the club, he featured more regularly, and notably scored in a 3–4 home loss against La Liga side SD Eibar also for the national cup.

==== Loan to Santos ====
On 16 August 2021, Augusto returned to Brazil and agreed to a one-year loan deal with Santos. He appeared for the under-23 side in the 2021 Copa Paulista, but never featured with the main squad, being separated from the side in March 2022.

=== Azuriz ===
In January 2023, Augusto joined Azuriz.

== Career statistics ==
As of 18 October 2023

Club	Season	League			State League		Cup		Continental		Other		Total	
Club	Season	Division	Apps	Goals	Apps	Goals	Apps	Goals	Apps	Goals	Apps	Goals	Apps	Goals
Real Madrid Castilla	2018–19	Segunda División B	18	0	—		—		—		1 (Note: Appearance(s) in promotion play-offs)	0	19	0
Cultural Leonesa (loan)	2019–20	Segunda División B	5	0	—		4	1	—		1	0	10	1
Las Rozas (loan)	2020–21	Segunda División B	13	1	—		2	1	—		—		15	2
Santos (loan)	2021	Série A	0	0	—		0	0	—		4 (Note: Appearance(s) in Copa Paulista)	1	4	1
Santos (loan)	2022	Série A	0	0	—		0	0	—		—		0	0
Santos (loan)	Total		0	0	—		0	0	—		4	1	4	1
Azuriz	2023	Paranaense	—		9	1	—		—		—		9	1
Caxias	2023	Série D	20	2	—		—		—		—		20	2
Career total			56	3	9	1	6	2	0	0	6	1	77	7
