= Lucas Lourenço =

Brazilian footballer

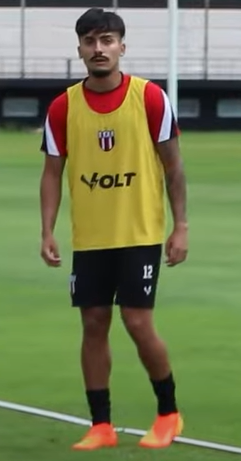
- Lucas Lourenço training with Botafogo-SP in 2023

Personal information
- Full name: Lucas Lourenço Andrade
- Date of birth: 23 January 2001 (age 25)
- Place of birth: Santos, Brazil
- Height: 1.64 m (5 ft 5 in)
- Position: Attacking midfielder

Team information
- Current team: Gama

Youth career
- 2007–2020: Santos

Senior career*
Years	Team	Apps	(Gls)
2018–2024	Santos	26	(0)
2021	→ Londrina (loan)	10	(0)
2022	→ Santo André (loan)	7	(0)
2022	→ CSA (loan)	5	(0)
2023	→ Botafogo-SP (loan)	7	(0)
2023	→ Figueirense (loan)	5	(0)
2024	Cianorte	18	(1)
2025	Paraná	3	(0)
2025	→ Gama (loan)	3	(0)
2025	Cianorte	0	(0)
2026–	Gama	5	(1)

International career^{‡}
2017	Brazil U17	1	(0)
- * Club domestic league appearances and goals as of 19 November 2026 ‡ National team caps and goals as of 14 April 2017

Lucas Lourenço Andrade (born 23 January 2001) (Brazilian Portuguese: [ˈlukɐz lowˈɾẽsu]), is a Brazilian footballer who plays as an attacking midfielder for Gama.

== Club career ==
Born in Santos, São Paulo, Lucas Lourenço joined Santos' football youth categories in 2013, after playing for the club's futsal team. On 2 October 2017, he signed his first professional contract with the club, lasting until September 2022.

In January 2018, Lucas Lourenço was promoted to the main squad by new manager Jair Ventura, but was demoted back to the under-17s in the following month. He subsequently moved to the under-20 squad before returning to the first team under new manager Cuca.

Lucas Lourenço made his first team – and Série A – debut on 2 December 2018, coming on as a second-half substitute for Jean Mota in a 2–1 away loss against Sport. On 1 September 2020, despite only featuring for the under-20s, he renewed his contract until December 2024.

On 15 September 2020, Lucas Lourenço made his Copa Libertadores debut by replacing fellow youth graduate Alison in a 0–0 home draw against Club Olimpia. On 20 July of the following year, he moved to Série B side Londrina on loan until the end of the season.

In September 2021, after missing trainings, Lucas Lourenço's loan was cut short and he returned to Santos. On 14 December, he was loaned to Santo André for the 2022 Campeonato Paulista.

On 6 July 2022, Lucas Lourenço was loaned to CSA for the remainder of the 2022 Série B. On 18 November, he moved to fellow league team Botafogo-SP also in a temporary deal.

On 4 July 2023, Lucas Lourenço moved to Série C side Figueirense on loan for the remainder of the year. On 1 February 2024, he rescinded his contract with Santos.

== International career ==
Lucas Lourenço was called up to Brazil under-17s for the 2017 Montaigu Tournament.

== Career statistics ==
As of 11 October 2023

Club	Season	League			State League		Cup		Continental		Other		Total	
Club	Season	Division	Apps	Goals	Apps	Goals	Apps	Goals	Apps	Goals	Apps	Goals	Apps	Goals
Santos	2018	Série A	1	0	0	0	0	0	—		—		1	0
Santos	2019	Série A	0	0	0	0	0	0	0	0	—		0	0
Santos	2020	Série A	17	0	0	0	1	0	4 (Note: Appearance(s) in Copa Libertadores)	0	—		22	0
Santos	2021	Série A	0	0	8	0	0	0	3	0	—		11	0
Santos	Total		18	0	8	0	1	0	7	0	0	0	34	0
Londrina (loan)	2021	Série B	10	0	—		—		—		—		10	0
Santo André (loan)	2022	Série D	0	0	7	0	—		—		—		7	0
CSA (loan)	2022	Série B	5	0	—		—		—		—		5	0
Botafogo-SP (loan)	2023	Série B	0	0	7	0	—		—		—		7	0
Figueirense (loan)	2023	Série C	5	0	—		—		—		—		5	0
Cianorte	2024	Série D	0	0	0	0	—		—		—		0	0
Career total			38	0	22	0	1	0	7	0	0	0	68	0
