= Danilo Boza =

Brazilian footballer (born 1998)

Personal information
- Full name: Danilo Boza Júnior
- Date of birth: 6 May 1998 (age 28)
- Place of birth: Rondonópolis, Brazil
- Height: 1.84 m (6 ft 0 in)
- Position: Defender

Team information
- Current team: Urawa Red Diamonds
- Number: 3

Youth career
- 2012–2014: Rondonópolis
- 2013: → Monte Azul (loan)
- 2015: Grêmio Prudente
- 2015: Palmeiras
- 2016–2017: Mirassol

Senior career*
Years	Team	Apps	(Gls)
2016–2021	Mirassol	20	(4)
2018–2019	→ Braga B (loan)	9	(0)
2019–2020	→ Athletico Paranaense (loan)	0	(0)
2019	→ Figueirense (loan)	0	(0)
2021	→ Santos (loan)	22	(0)
2022–2024	Juventude	70	(5)
2022	→ Vasco da Gama (loan)	17	(0)
2025–	Urawa Red Diamonds	42	(2)
- * Club domestic league appearances and goals as of 10 August 2026

Danilo Boza Júnior (born 6 May 1998), known as Danilo Boza, is a Brazilian footballer who plays as either a central defender or a right back for J1 League club, Urawa Red Diamonds.

== Club career ==
=== Early career ===
Born in Rondonópolis, Mato Grosso, Boza began his career with hometown side Rondonópolis before moving to the São Paulo state. After spending one year at Monte Azul, he had failed trials at Red Bull Brasil and Atlético Mineiro before playing for Grêmio Prudente's under-17 team in 2015.

=== Mirassol ===
Still in 2015, Boza moved to Palmeiras, but featured rarely and joined Mirassol in 2016, being initially assigned to the under-20s. He made his first team debut on 12 July 2016, starting in a 0–0 home draw against Votuporanguense, for the year's Copa Paulista.

Boza was definitely promoted to the main squad for the 2017 Copa Paulista, and scored his first senior goal on 15 July 2017, netting the equalizer in a 1–2 loss at Penapolense. On 6 July of the following year, after being a regular starter in the 2018 Campeonato Paulista, he was loaned to Portuguese side S.C. Braga.

Assigned to Braga's B-team in LigaPro, Boza featured rarely and subsequently returned to Brazil and joined Athletico Paranaense in July 2019. On 11 September, he moved to Figueirense on loan, but only featured for the under-21 team in the Copa Santa Catarina.

Back to Athletico for the 2020 campaign, Boza was assigned to the under-23 squad for the Campeonato Paranaense. After featuring rarely, he returned to Mirassol in July 2020, and helped the side to achieve promotion to the Série C as a starter.

==== Santos (loan) ====
On 2 June 2021, Boza was loaned to Santos until the end of the year, with a buyout clause. He made his debut for the club four days later, replacing Jean Mota late into a 3–1 Série A home win against Ceará.

=== Juventude ===
On 1 January 2022, Boza signed a permanent four-year contract with Juventude, also in the top tier.

==== Vasco da Gama (loan) ====
On 12 April 2022, Boza was loaned to Vasco da Gama for 2022 season.

=== Urawa Red Diamonds ===
On 25 January 2025, Boza was abroad to Japan for the first time and signing to J1 club, Urawa Red Diamonds for 2025 season.

== Career statistics ==
=== Club ===
As of the start for 2025 season.

Club	Season	League			State League		Cup		League Cup		Continental		Other		Total	
Club	Season	Division	Apps	Goals	Apps	Goals	Apps	Goals	Apps	Goals	Apps	Goals	Apps	Goals	Apps	Goals
Mirassol	2016	Paulista A2	—		0	0	—						3 (Note: Appearance(s) in Copa Paulista)	0	3	0
Mirassol	2017	Paulista	—		0	0	—						18	2	18	2
Mirassol	2018	Série D	5	1	14	0	—								19	1
Mirassol	2020	Série D	20	4	4	0	—								24	4
Mirassol	2021	Série C	0	0	11	1	1	0	—						12	1
Mirassol	Total		25	5	29	1	1	0	—				21	2	76	8
Braga B (loan)	2018–19	LigaPro	9	0	—										9	0
Figueirense (loan)	2019	Série B	0	0	—								8 (Note: Appearance(s) in Copa Santa Catarina)	0	8	0
Athletico Paranaense (loan)	2020	Série A	0	0	5	1	0	0	—						5	1
Santos (loan)	2021	Série A	22	0	—										22	0
Juventude	2022	Série A	0	0	11	0	2	0	—						13	0
Juventude	2023	Série B	38	2	11	0	1	0	—						50	2
Juventude	2024	Série A	32	3	10	0	4	1	—						46	4
Juventude	Total		101	5	37	1	7	1	—				8	0	153	7
Vasco da Gama (loan)	2022	Série B	17	0	—										17	0
Urawa Red Diamonds	2025	J1 League	0	0	—		0	0	0	0	—				0	0
Career total			143	10	66	2	8	1	0	0	0	0	29	2	246	15

== Honours ==
Mirassol

- Campeonato Brasileiro Série D: 2020
