= Alexandre Tam =

Brazilian footballer (born 1999)

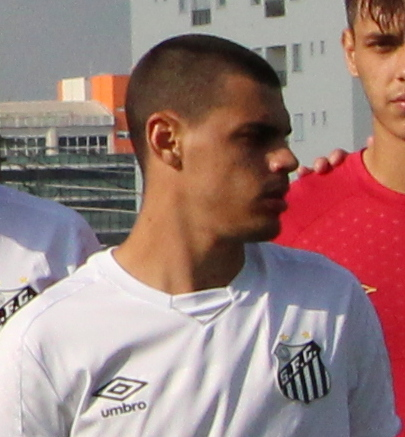
- Alexandre Tam with Santos in 2019

Personal information
- Full name: Alexandre Gomes Felipe
- Date of birth: 30 March 1999 (age 27)
- Place of birth: Guarujá, Brazil
- Height: 1.75 m (5 ft 9 in)
- Position: Attacking midfielder

Team information
- Current team: Cianorte

Youth career
- Itapema
- 2011–2019: Santos

Senior career*
Years	Team	Apps	(Gls)
2020–2022	Santos	0	(0)
2020	→ Confiança (loan)	6	(0)
2022–2023	Criciúma	7	(0)
2023	Sampaio Corrêa	3	(0)
2023	Náutico	0	(0)
2024–	Cianorte	1	(0)
- * Club domestic league appearances and goals as of 00:52, 31 January 2024 (UTC)

Alexandre Gomes Felipe (born 30 March 1999), known as Alexandre Tam (Brazilian Portuguese: [aleˈʃɐ̃ndɾi ˈtɐ̃m(i)]), is a Brazilian footballer who as either an attacking midfielder for Cianorte.

== Club career ==
Born in Guarujá, São Paulo, Alexandre Tam joined Santos' youth setup in 2011, aged 11, from SE Itapema. In February 2016, he signed his first professional contract with the club, until 2019.

Alexandre Tam was promoted to the first team by manager Jorge Sampaoli in June 2019, and signed a new contract until 2022 on 19 June. On 3 September 2020, he moved to Série B side Confiança on loan until the end of the season.

Alexandre Tam made his professional debut on 30 September 2020, coming on as a half-time substitute for Everton in a 1–1 home draw against Brasil de Pelotas. He returned to Santos in February 2021, after playing six league matches for Confiança, but remained unused and rescinded his contract on 12 April 2022.

== Career statistics ==
As of 14 February 2023

Club	Season	League			State League		Cup		Continental		Other		Total	
Club	Season	Division	Apps	Goals	Apps	Goals	Apps	Goals	Apps	Goals	Apps	Goals	Apps	Goals
Santos	2020	Série A	0	0	0	0	0	0	—		—		0	0
Santos	2021	Série A	0	0	0	0	0	0	—		0	0	0	0
Santos	Total		0	0	0	0	0	0	—		0	0	0	0
Confiança (loan)	2020	Série B	6	0	—		—		—		—		6	0
Criciúma	2022	Série B	2	0	4	0	—		—		—		6	0
Criciúma	2023	Série B	0	0	2	0	—		—		—		2	0
Criciúma	Total		2	0	6	0	—		—		—		8	0
Career total			8	0	6	0	0	0	0	0	0	0	14	0
