= Sandro Perpétuo =

Brazilian footballer

Personal information
- Full name: Sandro Martins Perpétuo Júnior
- Date of birth: 29 June 2001 (age 25)
- Place of birth: Governador Valadares, Brazil
- Height: 1.72 m (5 ft 8 in)
- Position: Right-back

Team information
- Current team: Jabaquara

Youth career
- 2012–2022: Santos
- 2019–2020: → Ponte Preta (loan)

Senior career*
Years	Team	Apps	(Gls)
2021–2022	Santos	5	(0)
2022–2024	Atlético Mineiro	0	(0)
2022	→ Oeste (loan)	1	(0)
2023	→ Villa Nova (loan)	2	(0)
2023	→ Oeste (loan)	0	(0)
2024	Taquaritinga	0	(0)
2025–	Jabaquara	0	(0)

International career
2016	Brazil U16		
- * Club domestic league appearances and goals as of 18:19, 10 January 2025 (UTC)

Sandro Martins Perpétuo Júnior (born 29 June 2001), known as Sandro Perpétuo or simply Sandro, is a Brazilian footballer who plays for Jabaquara. Mainly a right back, he can also play as a defensive midfielder.

== Club career ==
=== Santos ===
Sandro was born in Governador Valadares, Minas Gerais, and joined Santos' youth setup at the age of 11. On 27 November 2017, he signed his first professional contract with the club.

On 12 September 2019, Sandro was loaned to Ponte Preta until the end of the 2020 Copa São Paulo de Futebol Júnior. He returned to his parent club in February 2020.

Sandro made his professional debut on 28 February 2021, starting in a 2–2 Campeonato Paulista away draw against Santo André. He played four more matches for the side before returning to the under-20s, and rescinded his contract with the club on 15 March 2022.

=== Atlético Mineiro ===
On 16 March 2022, Sandro agreed to a deal with Atlético Mineiro.

== International career ==
On 14 October 2016, Sandro was called up to Brazil under-16s for a week of trainings.

== Career statistics ==
As of 18 October 2023

Club	Season	League			State League		Cup		Continental		Other		Total	
Club	Season	Division	Apps	Goals	Apps	Goals	Apps	Goals	Apps	Goals	Apps	Goals	Apps	Goals
Santos	2021	Série A	0	0	5	0	0	0	0	0	—		5	0
Atlético Mineiro	2022	Série A	0	0	—		0	0	—		—		0	0
Oeste (loan)	2022	Série D	1	0	—		—		—		4 (Note: Appearance(s) in Copa Paulista)	0	5	0
Villa Nova (loan)	2023	Mineiro	—		2	0	—		—		—		2	0
Oeste (loan)	2023	Paulista A2	—		—		—		—		4	0	4	0
Oeste (loan)	2023	Paulista A2	—		—		—		—		4	0	4	0
Taquaritinga	2024	Paulista A4	—		—		—		—		1	0	1	0
Jabaquara	2025	Paulista A4	—		0	0	—		—		—		0	0
Career total			1	0	7	0	0	0	0	0	9	0	17	0
