= Wellington Manzoli =

Brazilian footballer

Personal information
- Full name: Wellington Gonzaga de Assis Filho
- Date of birth: 5 June 2001 (age 25)
- Place of birth: Rio de Janeiro, Brazil
- Height: 1.94 m (6 ft 4 in)
- Positions: Centre-back; left-back

Team information
- Current team: São Bernardo
- Number: 25

Youth career
- 2018: Portuguesa-RJ
- 2019: Hercílio Luz
- 2019–2020: Criciúma

Senior career*
Years	Team	Apps	(Gls)
2020–2022	Criciúma	3	(0)
2020–2021	→ Santos (loan)	3	(0)
2022–2023	Almería B	19	(2)
2023	Feirense	2	(0)
2024	Boavista	4	(0)
2024	Paranavaí	7	(1)
2024	Amazonas	2	(0)
2025	Londrina	10	(1)
2026–	São Bernardo	6	(0)
- * Club domestic league appearances and goals as of 18 November 2026

Wellington Gonzaga de Assis Filho (born 5 June 2001), known as Wellington Manzoli or Wellington Tim, is a Brazilian footballer who plays as a centre-back or left-back for São Bernardo.

== Club career ==
=== Criciúma ===
Born in Rio de Janeiro, Wellington joined Criciúma's youth setup in 2019, from Hercílio Luz. After playing in the 2020 Copa São Paulo de Futebol Júnior, he was promoted to the main squad.

Wellington made his first team debut on 2 February 2020, starting in a 1–1 Campeonato Carioca home draw against Marcílio Dias.

==== Santos (loan) ====
In September 2020, Wellington joined Santos and was initially assigned to the B-team; the loan deal until December 2021 was confirmed by Criciúma on 28 October, after Santos' transfer ban was lifted. He made his first team – and Série A – debut the following 26 January, coming on as a half-time substitute for Wagner Leonardo in a 0–2 away loss against Atlético Mineiro.

Wellington made his Copa Libertadores debut on 30 January 2021, just in the tournament's Final, by replacing Felipe Jonatan late into a 0–1 loss against Palmeiras. He subsequently featured rarely for the first team, and spent the remainder of his loan spell with the under-20 and under-23 squads.

=== Almería ===
After returning from loan, Wellington featured rarely before signing a three-year contract with UD Almería on 26 August 2022, being assigned to the reserves in Tercera Federación.

=== Feirense ===
On 21 July 2023, Liga Portugal 2 side Feirense announced the permanent signing of Wellington. He only featured in two matches for the club before terminating his contract.

=== Boavista ===
On 3 January 2024, Wellington returned to Brazil, joining Boavista for the 2024 Campeonato Carioca.

== Career statistics ==
As of 5 August 2024

Appearances and goals by club, season and competition
Club	Season	League			State league		Cup		Continental		Other		Total	
Club	Season	Division	Apps	Goals	Apps	Goals	Apps	Goals	Apps	Goals	Apps	Goals	Apps	Goals
Criciúma	2020	Série C	0	0	2	0	1	0	—		—		3	0
Criciúma	2022	Série B	1	0	0	0	1	0	—		—		2	0
Criciúma	Total		1	0	2	0	2	0	—		—		5	0
Santos (loan)	2020	Série A	1	0	—		—		1 (Note: Appearance(s) in Copa Libertadores)	0	—		2	0
Santos (loan)	2021	Série A	0	0	2	0	0	0	—		—		2	0
Santos (loan)	Total		1	0	2	0	0	0	1	0	—		4	0
Almería B	2022–23	Tercera Federación	19	2	—		—		—		—		19	2
Feirense	2023–24	Liga Portugal 2	2	0	—		0	0	—		0	0	2	0
Boavista	2024	Carioca	—		4	0	—		—		—		4	0
Paranavaí	2024	Paranaense Série Prata	—		7	1	—		—		—		7	1
Amazonas	2024	Série B	0	0	—		—		—		—		0	0
Career total			23	2	15	1	2	0	1	0	0	0	41	3
