= Kevin Malthus =

Brazilian footballer

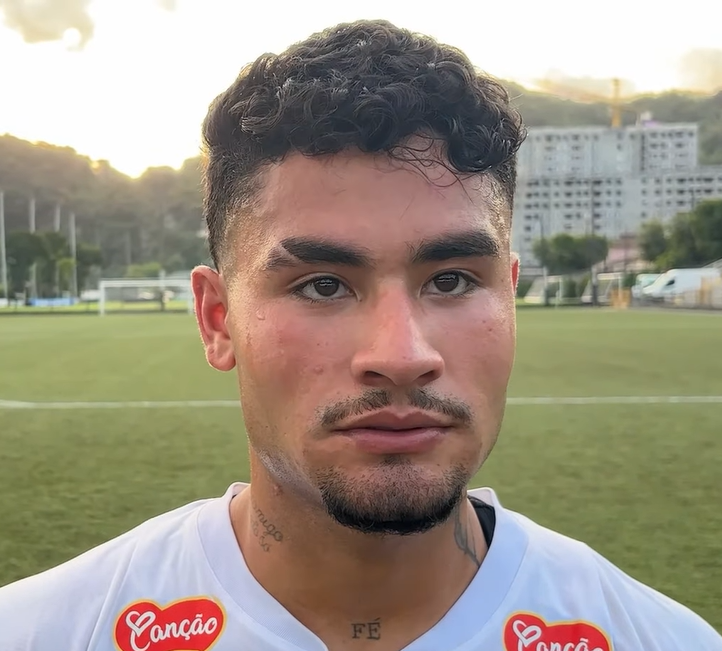
- Malthus in 2024

Personal information
- Full name: Kevin Malthus de Sousa Ribeiro
- Date of birth: 11 January 2003 (age 23)
- Place of birth: Belém, Brazil
- Height: 1.76 m (5 ft 9 in)
- Position: Midfielder

Team information
- Current team: FC Cascavel (on loan from EC São Bernardo)

Youth career
- 2013–2023: Santos

Senior career*
Years	Team	Apps	(Gls)
2021–2025	Santos	8	(0)
2025	→ Cianorte (loan)	6	(0)
2026–	EC São Bernardo	16	(3)
2026–	→ FC Cascavel (loan)	3	(0)
- * Club domestic league appearances and goals as of 21:20, 24 July 2026 (UTC)

Kevin Malthus de Sousa Ribeiro (born 11 January 2003), known as Kevin Malthus (Brazilian Portuguese: [ˈkɛvin ˈmawtos]) or simply Malthus (Brazilian Portuguese: [ˈmawtos]), is a Brazilian footballer who plays as a midfielder for FC Cascavel, on loan from EC São Bernardo.

== Club career ==
=== Santos ===
Born in Belém, Pará, Malthus moved to Santos, São Paulo at the age of ten, and subsequently joined Santos' youth setup. In December 2020, after Carlos Sánchez was sidelined due to injury, he was registered in the 2020 Copa Libertadores list for Peixe in his place.

Malthus made his professional debut on 28 February 2021, starting in a 2–2 Campeonato Paulista away draw against Santo André. On 29 April, he renewed his contract until March 2026.

On his Copa Libertadores debut on 4 May 2021, Malthus scored his first professional goal by netting the fifth in a 5–0 home routing over The Strongest. He made his Série A debut on 6 June, coming on as a late substitute for Marcos Guilherme in a 3–1 home win against Ceará.

On 3 August 2021, Malthus suffered a serious knee injury, being sidelined for the remainder of the season. Upon returning, he trained with the under-20s before suffering the same injury in April 2022.

In March 2023, after 19 months sidelined, Malthus returned to action with the under-20 team.

==== Loan to Cianorte ====
On 8 January 2025, after spending the previous season with the under-23 squad, Malthus agreed to move to Cianorte on loan.

=== EC São Bernardo ===
On 5 January 2026, EC São Bernardo announced the signing of Malthus after he rescinded his link with Santos.

== Career statistics ==
As of 24 July 2026

Club	Season	League			State League		Cup		Continental		Other		Total	
Club	Season	Division	Apps	Goals	Apps	Goals	Apps	Goals	Apps	Goals	Apps	Goals	Apps	Goals
Santos	2021	Série A	1	0	7	0	0	0	3 (Note: Appearance(s) in Copa Libertadores)	1	—		11	1
Santos	2022	Série A	0	0	0	0	0	0	—		—		0	0
Santos	2023	Série A	0	0	—		0	0	0	0	—		0	0
Santos	2024	Série B	0	0	—		—		—		—		0	0
Santos	Total		1	0	7	0	0	0	3	1	—		11	1
Cianorte (loan)	2025	Série D	5	0	1	0	—		—		—		6	0
EC São Bernardo	2026	Paulista A3	—		16	3	—		—		—		16	3
FC Cascavel (loan)	2026	Série D	3	0	—		—		—		—		3	0
Career total			9	0	24	3	0	0	3	1	0	0	36	4
