= Vinicius Balieiro =

Brazilian footballer

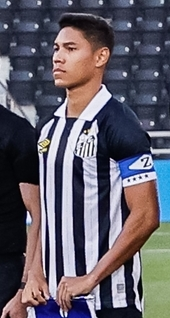
- Balieiro with Santos in 2024

Personal information
- Full name: Vinicius Balieiro Lourenço de Carvalho
- Date of birth: 28 May 1999 (age 27)
- Place of birth: Campinas, Brazil
- Height: 1.77 m (5 ft 10 in)
- Position: Defensive midfielder

Team information
- Current team: Chapecoense
- Number: 17

Youth career
- 2014: Paulista
- 2016–2017: Paulista
- 2017–2019: Santos

Senior career*
Years	Team	Apps	(Gls)
2017	Paulista	3	(0)
2020–2025	Santos	52	(1)
2023	→ Ituano (loan)	7	(0)
2025	→ Chapecoense (loan)	8	(0)
2026–	Chapecoense	0	(0)
- * Club domestic league appearances and goals as of 02:47, 19 February 2025 (UTC)

Vinicius Balieiro Lourenço de Carvalho (born 28 May 1999), known as Vinicius Balieiro (Brazilian Portuguese: [viˈnisjuz bɐliˈejɾu]), is a Brazilian footballer who plays for Chapecoense. Mainly a defensive midfielder, he can also play as a right back.

== Career ==
=== Paulista ===
Born in Campinas, São Paulo, Balieiro represented Paulista's under-15s in the 2014 season, but had to leave the club at the end of the season. He returned one year later and featured in the 2017 edition of the Copa São Paulo de Futebol Júnior.

Balieiro made his senior debut on 12 February 2017, coming on as a second-half substitute in a 2–0 away loss against Monte Azul. He appeared in two further matches for the main squad before leaving.

=== Santos ===
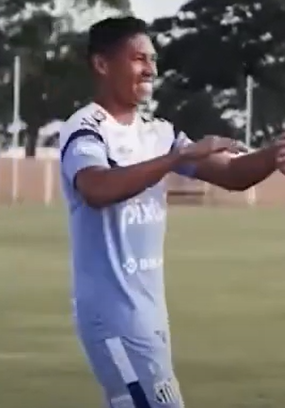
Balieiro training with Santos in 2023

In May 2017, Baileiro moved to Santos, being assigned to the under-20 squad. He was assigned to the B-team ahead of the 2019 campaign, training regularly with the first team. On 21 July 2020, he was registered for the year's Campeonato Paulista.

Balieiro made his first team – and Série A – debut for Santos on 14 November 2020, starting in a 2–0 home win against Internacional. He made his Copa Libertadores debut ten days later, replacing goalscorer Yeferson Soteldo in a 2–1 away success over LDU Quito.

Balieiro scored his first professional goal on 9 March 2021, netting the opener in a 2–1 home win against Deportivo Lara. On 11 October, he renewed his contract until December 2025.

==== Loan to Ituano ====
On 2 August 2023, Balieiro was loaned to Série B side Ituano until the end of the year.

=== Chapecoense ===
On 8 January 2025, after spending the previous campaign without playing, Balieiro was loaned to Chapecoense in the second division, for one year. He was an immediate first-choice until suffering a knee injury in February, and signed a permanent deal with the club the following January.

== Personal life ==
Balieiro is physically likened to former Brazil national team midfielder Paulinho, being known as Paulinho during his stint at Paulista. His younger brother Thiago is also a footballer; a central defender, he also played for Santos.

== Career statistics ==
As of 16 December 2025

Club	Season	League			State League		Cup		Continental		Other		Total	
Club	Season	Division	Apps	Goals	Apps	Goals	Apps	Goals	Apps	Goals	Apps	Goals	Apps	Goals
Paulista	2017	Paulista A3	—		3	0	—		—		—		3	0
Santos	2020	Série A	12	0	0	0	0	0	3 (Note: Appearance(s) in Copa Libertadores)	0	—		15	0
Santos	2021	Série A	13	0	10	1	4	0	8	2	1 (Note: Appearance(s) in Copa Paulista)	0	36	3
Santos	2022	Série A	5	0	7	0	2	0	1 (Note: Appearance(s) in Copa Sudamericana)	0	—		15	0
Santos	2023	Série A	3	0	2	0	1	0	0	0	—		6	0
Santos	2024	Série B	0	0	0	0	—		—		—		0	0
Santos	Total		33	0	19	1	7	0	12	2	1	0	72	3
Ituano (loan)	2023	Série B	7	0	—		—		—		—		7	0
Chapecoense (loan)	2025	Série B	0	0	8	0	—		—		1 (Note: Appearance(s) in Copa Santa Catarina)	0	9	0
Career total			40	0	30	1	7	0	12	2	2	0	91	3

== Honours ==
Santos

- Campeonato Brasileiro Série B: 2024
