= Thiago Balieiro =

Brazilian footballer

- Balieiro with Santos in 2024

Personal information
- Full name: Thiago Balieiro Lourenço de Carvalho
- Date of birth: 23 February 2003 (age 23)
- Place of birth: Campinas, Brazil
- Height: 1.90 m (6 ft 3 in)
- Position: Centre-back

Team information
- Current team: Vitória Guimarães
- Number: 28

Youth career
- 2019–2024: Santos

Senior career*
| Years | Team | Apps | (Gls) |
| 2024–2025 | Leixões | 5 | (0) |
| 2025–2026 | Vitória Guimarães B | 10 | (0) |
| 2025– | Vitória Guimarães | 14 | (1) |
- * Club domestic league appearances and goals as of 16:09, 10 August 2026 (UTC)

Thiago Balieiro Lourenço de Carvalho (born 23 February 2003), known as Thiago Balieiro, is a Brazilian footballer who plays as a centre-back for Portuguese club Vitória de Guimarães.

== Career ==
Born in Campinas, São Paulo, Balieiro joined the youth categories of Santos in 2019, aged 16. On 11 October 2021, he and his brother renewed their contracts with the club, with Thiago agreeing to a three-year deal.

Regularly used in the under-20s in the following years, Balieiro rescinded his contract with Peixe in July 2024, and subsequently joined Portuguese side Leixões. Initially a member of the under-23 team, he made his professional debut on 16 March 2025, coming on as a late substitute for Rafael Vieira in a 1–0 Liga Portugal 2 away win over Porto B.

On 1 July 2025, Balieiro signed a four-year deal with Vitória de Guimarães, being initially a member of the B-team in the Liga 3. He made his first team debut on 22 November, replacing Rodrigo Abascal late into a 4–0 home routing of Mortágua in the Taça de Portugal.

Balieiro made his Primeira Liga debut on 23 December 2025, starting in a 4–1 home loss to Sporting CP, and scored his first goal in the category the following 14 February, netting the equalizer in a 2–1 home win over Estrela da Amadora. He subsequently established himself as a regular starter for the side, playing in all but one of the remaining 12 matches of the season.

== Personal life ==
Balieiro's older brother Vinicius is also a footballer; a defensive midfielder, he also played for Santos.

== Honours ==
Vitória de Guimarães

- Taça da Liga: 2025–26
