= João Cubas =

Brazilian footballer

Personal information
- Full name: João Victor Cubas Alves
- Date of birth: 21 November 2000 (age 25)
- Place of birth: Avaré, Brazil
- Height: 1.87 m (6 ft 2 in)
- Position: Centre back

Team information
- Current team: Monte Azul

Youth career
- São Carlos
- 2016–2017: XV de Jaú
- 2018–2019: América Mineiro

Senior career*
Years	Team	Apps	(Gls)
2018	XV de Jaú	9	(0)
2019–2020	América Mineiro	2	(1)
2020–2021	Santos	0	(0)
2022	Tupynambás	2	(0)
2023	Maringá	0	(0)
2023	Rio Branco-SP	21	(1)
2024–	Monte Azul	6	(0)
- * Club domestic league appearances and goals as of 17:11, 16 May 2024 (UTC)

João Victor Cubas Alves (born 21 November 2000) is a Brazilian footballer who plays as a central defender for Maringá.

== Club career ==
Born in Avaré, São Paulo, Cubas joined XV de Jaú in 2016, from São Carlos. He made his first team debut for the former on 29 April 2018, starting in a 1–0 Campeonato Paulista Segunda Divisão home win against Independente de Limeira.

Subsequently, Cubas moved to América Mineiro and returned to youth football, being assigned to the under-20 squad. He made his debut with the main squad of Coelho on 13 October 2019, playing the full 90 minutes and scoring his team's only in a 2–1 away loss against Figueirense, for the Série B championship.

On 2 September 2020, after only one further appearance for América, Cubas joined Santos and was initially assigned to the B-team.

== Career statistics ==
As of 16 May 2024

Club	Season	League			State League		Cup		Continental		Other		Total	
Club	Season	Division	Apps	Goals	Apps	Goals	Apps	Goals	Apps	Goals	Apps	Goals	Apps	Goals
XV de Jaú	2018	Paulista 2ª Divisão	—		9	0	—		—		—		9	0
América Mineiro	2019	Série B	2	1	0	0	0	0	—		—		2	1
América Mineiro	2020	Série B	0	0	0	0	0	0	—		—		0	0
América Mineiro	Total		2	1	0	0	0	0	—		—		2	1
Santos	2020	Série A	0	0	—		—		—		0	0	0	0
Santos	2021	Série A	0	0	—		—		—		3 (Note: Appearance(s) in Copa Paulista)	0	3	0
Santos	Total		0	0	—		—		—		3	0	3	0
Tupynambás	2022	Mineiro Módulo II	—		2	0	—		—		—		2	0
Maringá	2023	Série D	0	0	0	0	0	0	—		—		0	0
Rio Branco-SP	2023	Paulista 2ª Divisão	—		21	1	—		—		—		21	1
Monte Azul	2024	Paulista A2	—		6	0	—		—		—		6	0
Career total			2	1	38	1	0	0	0	0	3	0	43	2
