= Matheo Zoch =

Bolivian footballer (born 1996)

Personal information
- Full name: Matheo Henrique Zoch Mèndez
- Date of birth: 12 July 1996 (age 30)
- Position: Midfielder

Team information
- Current team: Real Santa Cruz

Senior career*
Years	Team	Apps	(Gls)
2013-2017	Oriente Petrolero	29	(2)
2017	Huachipato	6	(1)
2018	Guabirá	35	(3)
2019	Royal Parí	17	(3)
2020	Oriente Petrolero	18	(2)
2021	The Strongest	3	(0)
2022	Real Santa Cruz	16	(2)
2022	Wilstermann	10	(0)
2023	Real Santa Cruz	6	(0)

International career
2020	Bolivia	1	(0)
- * Club domestic league appearances and goals as of 00:15 (UTC) 30 April 2024

Matheo Henrique Zoch Mèndez (born 12 July 1996) is a Bolivian footballer who last played in Bolivian Primera División for Real Santa Cruz.

== Club career ==
From Santa Cruz de la Sierra, Zoch came through the ranks at Oriente Petrolero and debuted in the FBF División Profesional at the age of 17 years-old, before moving to Chilean club C.D. Huachipato in 2017.

Having had short spells with Club Deportivo Guabirá and Royal Pari, he returned to Oriente Petrolero for the 2020 season having missed most of 2019 having suffered a double fracture of his tibia and fibula whilst playing for Royal Pari against Club Blooming. He signed for The Strongest on 16 January 2021. The following year, he played for Real Santa Cruz and later began training with C.D. Jorge Wilstermann, but was still suffering from injuries which effected his availability.

== International career ==
Zoch made his full debut for Bolivia on the 10 November 2016 against Venezuela.
