= Lucas González (footballer, born 2000) =

Argentine footballer

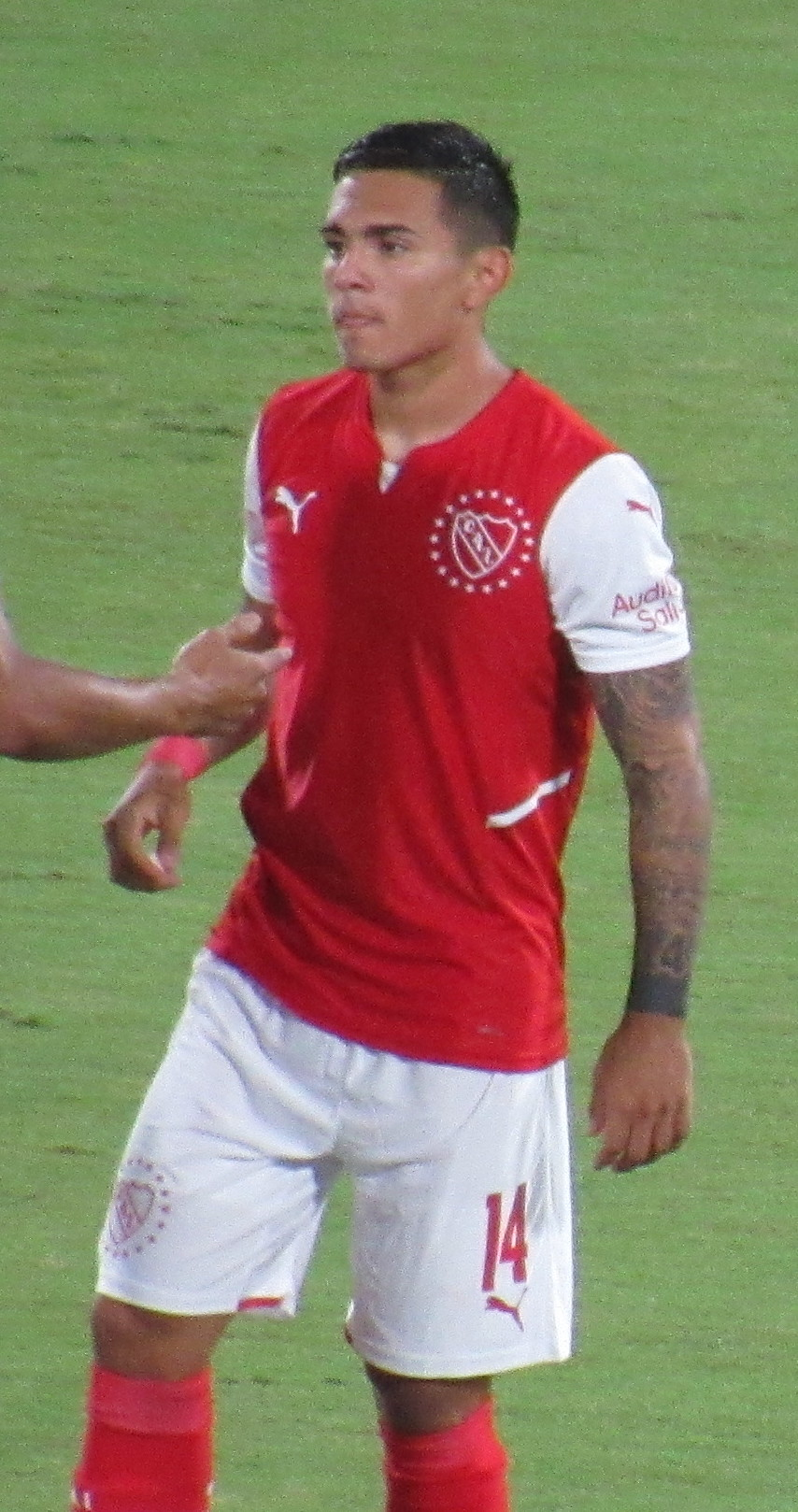

Personal information
- Full name: Lucas Nahuel González Martínez
- Date of birth: 3 June 2000 (age 26)
- Place of birth: San Salvador de Jujuy, Argentina
- Height: 1.69 m (5 ft 7 in)
- Position: Midfielder

Team information
- Current team: Central Córdoba SdE (on loan from Defensa y Justicia)
- Number: 18

Youth career
- Gimnasia Jujuy
- 2009–2015: Argentinos Juniors
- 2015–2019: Independiente

Senior career*
Years	Team	Apps	(Gls)
2019–2025	Independiente	99	(3)
2023	→ Santos Laguna (loan)	14	(1)
2025–	Defensa y Justicia	19	(1)
2026–	→ Central Córdoba SdE (loan)	27	(0)
- * Club domestic league appearances and goals as of 17:21, 12 November 2026 (UTC)

Lucas Nahuel González Martínez (born 3 June 2000) is an Argentine professional footballer who plays as a midfielder for Central Córdoba SdE, on loan from Defensa y Justicia.

== Career ==
González started his career with Gimnasia y Esgrima, before leaving in 2009 to join Argentinos Juniors where he remained until 2015 after penning terms with Independiente. His breakthrough campaign came in 2019–20, with the midfielder making his senior debut in a Copa Sudamericana round of sixteen home win over Ecuadorian club Universidad Católica. His bow in the Primera División didn't arrive until 1 February 2020, as he was substituted on for the final twelve minutes of a 5–0 win over Rosario Central; his first start occurred a month later against Central Córdoba.

== Personal life ==
González is the son of former professional footballer Alejandro González.

== Career statistics ==
As of 3 November 2020

Appearances and goals by club, season and competition
Club	Season	League			National cup		League cup		Continental		Other		Total	
Club	Season	Division	Apps	Goals	Apps	Goals	Apps	Goals	Apps	Goals	Apps	Goals	Apps	Goals
Independiente	2019–20	Primera División	2	0	0	0	1	0	1 (Note: Appearance(s) in the Copa Sudamericana)	0	0	0	4	0
Independiente	2020–21 (Note: Soccerway counts Copa de la Liga Profesional appearances as league appearances.)	Primera División	1	0	0	0	0	0	0	0	0	0	1	0
Career total			3	0	0	0	1	0	1	0	0	0	5	0
