= Eduardo Zuma =

Brazilian football manager

Personal information
- Full name: Eduardo Henrique Bernardo de Oliveira
- Date of birth: 26 September 1982 (age 44)
- Place of birth: Leme, Brazil

Managerial career
- Years: Team
- 2017: Portuguesa (assistant)
- 2018: Atlético Paranaense (assistant)
- 2019–2021: São Paulo (assistant)
- 2021: Santos (assistant)
- 2021: Vasco da Gama (assistant)
- 2022–2023: Flamengo U16
- 2023: Gramadense U20
- 2024: Cerro Porteño (assistant)
- 2024: Flamengo U17
- 2025: Barra-SC U20
- 2026: Cuiabá U20

Eduardo Henrique Bernardo de Oliveira (born 26 September 1982), known as Eduardo Zuma, is a Brazilian football coach.

== Career ==
Born in Leme, São Paulo, Zuma worked in the scouting areas before being named Guilherme Alves' assistant at Portuguesa in 2017. In 2018, he joined Fernando Diniz's staff at Atlético Paranaense.

Zuma followed Diniz to São Paulo and Santos, always as his assistant. He was also an interim manager of the latter club on two occasions, against former side Athletico (2–1 home win) and Fortaleza (1–1 away draw), both when Diniz was suspended.

== Managerial statistics ==
As of 9 May 2021

Managerial record by team and tenure
Team	Nat	From	To	Record								Ref
Team	Nat	From	To	G	W	D	L	GF	GA	GD	Win %	Ref
Santos (interim)	(Brazil)	6 July 2021	6 July 2021	1	1	0	0	2	1	+1	100.00	
Santos (interim)	(Brazil)	15 August 2021	15 August 2021	1	0	1	0	1	1	+0	0.00	
Total				2	1	1	0	3	2	+1	50.00	—
