= Mafra, Santa Catarina =

Mafra
- Municipality
- The Municipality of Mafra
- Flag Coat of arms
- Motto: Pérola do Planalto
- Location in the State of Santa Catarina

- Coordinates: 26°06′39″S 49°48′18″W
- Country: Brazil
- Region: South
- State: Santa Catarina
- Founded: September 8, 1917

Government
  - Mayor: Emerson Mass (PODE, 2021-2024)

Area
  - Total: 1,404.206 km^{2} (542.167 sq mi)
- Elevation: 793 m (2,602 ft)

Population (2020)
  - Total: 56,561
  - Density: 36.32/km^{2} (94.1/sq mi)
- Time zone: UTC-3 (UTC-3)
  - Summer (DST): UTC-2 (UTC-2)
- HDI (2000): 0.788
- Website: www.mafra.sc.gov.br

Mafra is a city located at the northern border of the state of Santa Catarina, Brazil. This city borders to the state of Paraná and its urban area is attached to the urban area of its interstate neighbour, Rio Negro. This city's population is composed primarily of descendants of European immigrants, especially from Germany (including Volga Germans) and Poland. This city is also known for its honey, which is said to have excellent quality.
