= 2022 Santos FC season =

Santos
2022 season
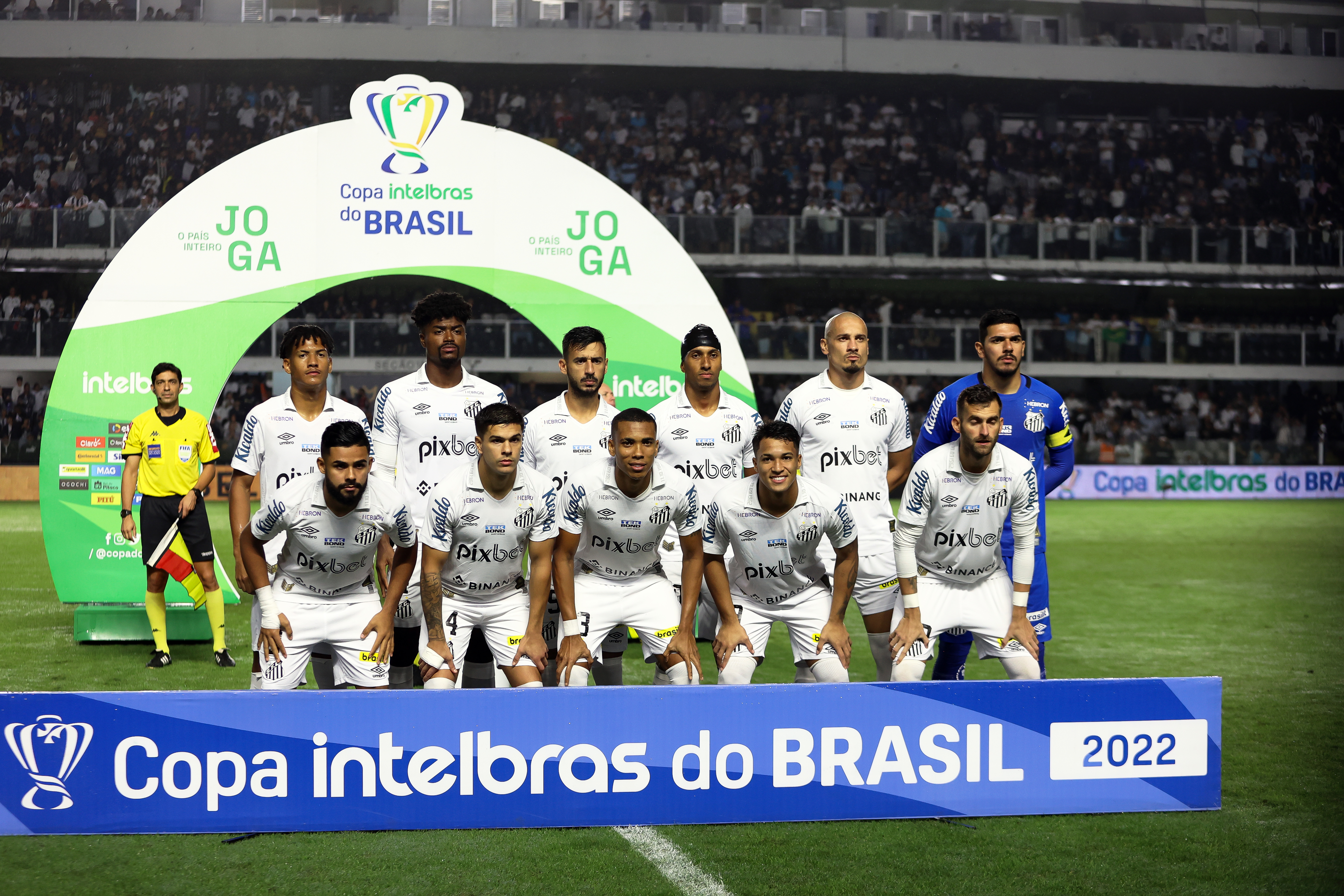
- Santos lineup prior to the match against Corinthians at the Vila Belmiro on 13 July
- President: Andrés Rueda
- Coach: Fábio Carille (until 18 February); Marcelo Fernandes (caretaker, 18 February – 27 February, 7 July – 20 July); Fabián Bustos (from 28 February – until 7 July); Lisca (from 20 July – until 12 September); Orlando Ribeiro (caretaker, 12 September)
- Stadium: Vila Belmiro
- Campeonato Brasileiro: 12th
- Campeonato Paulista: Group stage
- Copa do Brasil: Round of 16
- Copa Sudamericana: Round of 16
- Top goalscorer: League: Marcos Leonardo (13); All: Marcos Leonardo (21)
Home colours	Away colours	Third colours

The 2022 season was Santos FC's 110th season in existence and the club's sixty-third consecutive season in the top flight of Brazilian football. As well as the Campeonato Brasileiro, the club competes in the Copa do Brasil and the Campeonato Paulista.

== Players ==
=== Squad information ===
N	Name	Pos.	Nat.	Place of Birth	Date of Birth (Age)	Caps	Goals	Signed from	Date signed	Fee	Contract End
Goalkeepers
22	John Victor	GK	(Brazil)	Diadema (São Paulo (state))	13 February 1996 (aged 26)	29	0	Youth System	15 January 2016	Free	31 December 2024
34	João Paulo	GK	(Brazil)	Dourados (Mato Grosso do Sul)	29 June 1995 (aged 27)	152	0	Youth System	26 February 2014	Free	30 November 2026
50	Paulo Mazoti	GK	(Brazil)	Ribeirão Pires (São Paulo (state))	11 July 2000 (aged 22)	–	–	Youth System	13 November 2020	Free	31 December 2022
52	Diógenes	GK	(Brazil)	Itapecerica da Serra (São Paulo (state))	6 January 2001 (aged 21)	–	–	Youth System	9 July 2021	Free	31 December 2024
Defenders
2	Luiz Felipe	CB	(Brazil)	Tubarão (Santa Catarina (state))	9 October 1993 (aged 29)	169	5	Paraná	17 February 2016	R$ 1M	31 December 2024
3	Felipe Jonatan	LB	(Brazil)	Fortaleza (Ceará)	15 February 1998 (aged 24)	188	6	Ceará	1 March 2019	R$ 6M	28 February 2025
4	Eduardo Bauermann	CB	(Brazil)	Estância Velha (Rio Grande do Sul)	13 February 1996 (aged 26)	58	2	América Mineiro	3 January 2022	Free	31 December 2024
13	Madson	RB	(Brazil)	Itaparica (Bahia)	13 January 1992 (aged 30)	127	13	Grêmio	14 December 2019	Swap	31 December 2022
16	Nathan Santos	RB	(Brazil)	Rio de Janeiro (Rio de Janeiro (state))	5 September 2001 (aged 21)	9	0	Boavista (Portugal)	6 August 2022	Undisc.	31 December 2026
26	Leonardo Zabala	CB	(Bolivia)	Santa Cruz de la Sierra	23 May 2003 (aged 19)	–	–	Youth System	15 July 2022	Free	31 December 2023
27	Auro	RB	(Brazil)	Jaú (São Paulo (state))	23 January 1996 (aged 26)	14	0	Toronto FC (Canada)	14 February 2022	Loan	31 December 2022
28	Jair	CB	(Brazil)	Orlândia (São Paulo (state))	7 March 2005 (aged 17)	–	–	Youth System	26 January 2022	Free	15 June 2025
31	Alex	CB	(Brazil)	Ribeirão Preto (São Paulo (state))	10 May 1999 (aged 23)	22	1	Fluminense	7 May 2019	Free	31 December 2024
32	Derick	CB	(Brazil)	Santos (São Paulo (state))	16 May 2002 (aged 20)	2	0	Youth System	8 September 2020	Free	31 March 2026
33	Maicon	CB	(Brazil)	Barretos (São Paulo (state))	14 September 1988 (aged 34)	28	0	Cruzeiro	8 March 2022	Free	31 December 2023
38	Kevyson	LB/AM	(Brazil)	Leopoldina (Minas Gerais)	29 March 2004 (aged 18)	–	–	Youth System	12 July 2022	Free	31 December 2024
44	Lucas Pires	LB	(Brazil)	São Paulo (São Paulo (state))	24 March 2001 (aged 21)	40	0	Youth System	24 August 2021	Free	31 May 2026
Midfielders
5	Gabriel Carabajal	DM	(Argentina)	Lozada	9 December 1991 (aged 30)	8	1	Argentinos Juniors (Argentina)	12 August 2022	R$ 7M	31 December 2026
6	Sandry	DM/CM	(Brazil)	Itabuna (Bahia)	30 August 2002 (aged 20)	78	0	Youth System	18 January 2019	Free	31 May 2026
7	Pato Sánchez	CM/AM	(Uruguay)	Montevideo	2 December 1984 (aged 37)	161	32	Monterrey (Mexico)	23 July 2018	Free	22 July 2023
8	Jhojan Julio	AM	(Ecuador)	Quito	11 February 1998 (aged 24)	21	1	LDU (Ecuador)	31 March 2022	Loan	31 May 2023
14	Rodrigo Fernández	DM	(Uruguay)	Montevideo	3 January 1996 (aged 26)	38	1	Guaraní (Paraguay)	29 March 2022	Loan	31 December 2022
17	Vinicius Balieiro	DM/RB	(Brazil)	Campinas (São Paulo (state))	28 May 1999 (aged 23)	65	3	Youth System	13 November 2020	Free	31 December 2025
20	Luan	AM	(Brazil)	São José do Rio Preto (São Paulo (state))	27 March 1993 (aged 29)	8	1	Corinthians	6 August 2022	Loan	30 November 2022
21	Lucas Barbosa	AM	(Brazil)	Bebedouro (São Paulo (state))	22 February 2001 (aged 21)	44	4	Youth System	10 April 2022	Free	31 August 2025
24	Kevin Malthus	CM/DM	(Brazil)	Belém (Pará)	11 January 2003 (aged 19)	11	1	Youth System	27 February 2021	Free	31 March 2026
25	Vinicius Zanocelo	CM	(Brazil)	Santo André (São Paulo (state))	30 January 2001 (aged 21)	76	5	Ferroviária	7 June 2021	Loan	31 May 2023
29	Camacho	DM	(Brazil)	Rio de Janeiro (Rio de Janeiro (state))	2 March 1990 (aged 32)	79	1	Corinthians	15 June 2021	Free	31 December 2022
37	Ed Carlos	AM	(Brazil)	São Paulo (São Paulo (state))	19 March 2001 (aged 21)	6	0	Youth System	19 July 2022	Free	31 July 2023
40	Bruno Oliveira	AM	(Brazil)	Vinhedo (São Paulo (state))	1 February 1998 (aged 24)	22	0	Caldense	22 December 2021	Loan	31 December 2022
47	Miguel Terceros	AM	(Bolivia)	Santa Cruz de la Sierra	25 April 2004 (aged 18)	2	0	Youth System	20 July 2022	Free	31 July 2027
—	Ivonei	CM/AM	(Brazil)	Rondonópolis (Mato Grosso)	16 April 2002 (aged 20)	30	1	Youth System	12 July 2019	Free	31 July 2025
Forwards
9	Marcos Leonardo	ST	(Brazil)	Itapetinga (Bahia)	3 May 2003 (aged 19)	119	33	Youth System	21 July 2020	Free	31 December 2026
10	Yeferson Soteldo	LW/AM	(Venezuela)	Acarigua	30 June 1997 (aged 23)	112	20	Tigres (Mexico)	11 August 2022	Loan	31 July 2023
11	Ângelo	RW	(Brazil)	Brasília (Federal District (Brazil))	21 December 2004 (aged 17)	97	3	Youth System	22 October 2020	Free	10 December 2024
12	Rwan Seco	ST	(Brazil)	Jaboatão dos Guararapes (Pernambuco)	20 May 2001 (aged 21)	30	4	Youth System	26 January 2022	Free	31 December 2024
15	Bryan Angulo	ST	(Ecuador)	Guayaquil	30 November 1995 (aged 26)	24	5	Cruz Azul (Mexico)	2 April 2022	Free	30 June 2023
30	Lucas Braga	LW	(Brazil)	São Paulo (São Paulo (state))	10 November 1996 (aged 25)	157	17	Luverdense	5 June 2019	Free	30 April 2026
35	Fernandinho	LW	(Brazil)	Uberaba (Minas Gerais)	20 March 2003 (aged 19)	1	0	Youth System	2 March 2021	Free	31 December 2024
36	Weslley Patati	RW	(Brazil)	Presidente Dutra (Maranhão)	1 October 2003 (aged 19)	2	0	Youth System	26 January 2022	Free	31 December 2024
39	Tailson	RW/AM	(Brazil)	Santo André (São Paulo (state))	5 March 1999 (aged 23)	36	1	Youth System	18 January 2019	Free	31 July 2024
43	Renyer	RW/LW	(Brazil)	Rio de Janeiro (Rio de Janeiro (state))	12 July 2003 (aged 19)	8	0	Youth System	23 January 2020	Free	30 November 2023

Source: SantosFC.com.br (for appearances and goals), Wikipedia players' articles (for international appearances and goals), FPF (for contracts). Players in italic were not registered for the Campeonato Paulista.

=== Copa Sudamericana squad ===
- Players in ~~strike~~ are no longer in the squad
- Players in italic were included in the last submission

Note: Flags indicate national team as defined under FIFA eligibility rules; some limited exceptions apply. Players may hold more than one non-FIFA nationality.

No.	Pos.	Nation	Player
1	GK	BRA	Edu Araújo
2	DF	BRA	Luiz Felipe
3	DF	BRA	Felipe Jonatan
4	DF	BRA	Eduardo Bauermann
5	MF	BRA	~~Willian Maranhão~~
6	MF	BRA	Sandry
7	MF	URU	Carlos Sánchez
8	MF	ECU	Jhojan Julio
9	FW	BRA	Marcos Leonardo
10	MF	CHN	~~Ricardo Goulart~~
11	FW	BRA	Ângelo Gabriel
12	FW	BRA	Rwan Seco
13	DF	BRA	Madson
14	MF	URU	Rodrigo Fernández
15	FW	ECU	Bryan Angulo
16	DF	URU	~~Emiliano Velázquez~~
17	MF	BRA	Vinicius Balieiro
18	DF	BRA	Andrey Quintino
19	FW	BRA	~~Léo Baptistão~~
20	MF	BRA	~~Gabriel Pirani~~
21	MF	BRA	Lucas Barbosa
22	GK	BRA	John
23	FW	BRA	~~Marcos Guilherme~~
24	DF	BRA	Cadu
25	MF	BRA	Vinicius Zanocelo

No.	Pos.	Nation	Player
26	DF	BRA	~~Robson Reis~~
27	DF	BRA	Auro
28	DF	BRA	~~Kaiky~~
29	MF	BRA	Camacho
30	FW	BRA	Lucas Braga
31	GK	BRA	Diógenes
32	DF	BRA	Derick
33	DF	BRA	Maicon
34	GK	BRA	João Paulo
35	FW	BRA	Fernandinho
36	MF	BRA	Ivonei
37	DF	BRA	Jair
38	MF	BRA	João Victor
39	MF	BRA	Matheus Nunes
40	MF	BRA	Bruno Oliveira
41	DF	BOL	Leonardo Zabala
43	FW	BRA	Nycollas
44	DF	BRA	Lucas Pires
45	DF	BRA	Pedrinho Scaramussa
46	MF	BRA	Rafael Moreira
47	FW	BRA	Renyer
48	FW	BRA	Victor Michell
49	FW	BRA	Weslley Patati
50	GK	BRA	Paulo Mazoti

Source: Santos FC

=== Appearances and goals ===
No.	Pos.	Nat	Name	Campeonato Brasileiro		Campeonato Paulista		Copa do Brasil		Copa Sudamericana		Total	
No.	Pos.	Nat	Name	Apps	Goals	Apps	Goals	Apps	Goals	Apps	Goals	Apps	Goals
52	GK	(Brazil)	Diógenes	0	0	0	0	0	0	0	0	0	0
34	GK	(Brazil)	João Paulo	37	0	12	0	6	0	7	0	61	0
22	GK	(Brazil)	John	1	0	0	0	0	0	1	0	2	0
50	GK	(Brazil)	Paulo Mazoti	0	0	0	0	0	0	0	0	0	0
31	DF	(Brazil)	Alex	4	1	0	0	0	0	0	0	4	1
27	DF	(Brazil)	Auro	5+3	0	3	0	0+1	0	2+1	0	15	0
4	DF	(Brazil)	Eduardo Bauermann	33	1	12	1	6	0	7	0	58	2
61	DF	(Uruguay)	Emiliano Velázquez	5+4	0	3+1	0	1	0	2+1	0	17	0
3	DF	(Brazil)	Felipe Jonatan	24+2	0	4	0	1+2	0	3	0	36	0
28	DF	(Brazil)	Kaiky	1	0	10	1	3	0	4	0	18	1
44	DF	(Brazil)	Lucas Pires	16+4	0	7+3	0	5	0	5+2	0	42	0
2	DF	(Brazil)	Luiz Felipe	10+3	1	2	0	0+1	0	2	0	18	1
13	DF	(Brazil)	Madson	24+2	2	8	1	3	1	3+1	0	41	4
33	DF	(Brazil)	Maicon	23	0	0	0	2	0	3	0	28	0
16	DF	(Brazil)	Nathan Santos	7+2	0	0	0	0	0	0	0	9	0
40	MF	(Brazil)	Bruno Oliveira	4+9	0	0+4	0	0+2	0	2+1	0	22	0
29	MF	(Brazil)	Camacho	18+8	1	9+2	0	3+2	0	3+1	0	46	1
7	MF	(Uruguay)	Carlos Sánchez	10+4	0	0+4	0	0+1	0	0+2	0	21	0
37	MF	(Brazil)	Ed Carlos	3+3	0	0	0	0	0	0	0	6	0
5	MF	(Argentina)	Gabriel Carabajal	7+1	1	0	0	0	0	0	0	8	1
20	MF	(Brazil)	Gabriel Pirani	0+3	0	1+4	0	0+1	0	1+4	0	14	0
15	MF	(Brazil)	Ivonei	0	0	0	0	0	0	0	0	0	0
8	MF	(Brazil)	Jobson	0	0	0+2	0	0+1	0	0	0	3	0
8	MF	(Ecuador)	Jhojan Julio	12+2	0	0	0	3	0	3+1	1	21	1
20	MF	(Brazil)	Luan	4+4	1	0	0	0	0	0	0	8	1
21	MF	(Brazil)	Lucas Barbosa	5+20	2	3+3	1	0+3	0	3+3	1	40	4
47	MF	(Bolivia)	Miguel Terceros	0+2	0	0	0	0	0	0	0	2	0
10	MF	(China)	Ricardo Goulart	4+7	0	9	3	4	1	5+1	0	30	4
14	MF	(Uruguay)	Rodrigo Fernández	28+1	0	0	0	3+1	1	3+1	0	37	1
6	MF	(Brazil)	Sandry	4+18	0	3+4	0	4+1	0	3+2	0	39	0
17	MF	(Brazil)	Vinicius Balieiro	0+5	0	3+4	0	2	0	1	0	15	0
25	MF	(Brazil)	Vinicius Zanocelo	26+2	3	9+1	1	2+3	1	4+3	0	50	5
5	MF	(Brazil)	Willian Maranhão	1+3	0	0	0	1	0	4	0	9	0
49	FW	(Brazil)	Allanzinho	0	0	0+2	0	0	0	0	0	2	0
11	FW	(Brazil)	Ângelo	16+11	1	8+2	0	4+1	1	3+1	0	46	2
15	FW	(Ecuador)	Bryan Angulo	5+11	2	0	0	1+1	0	5+1	3	24	5
92	FW	(Brazil)	Léo Baptistão	16+1	5	1+5	1	3+1	0	0+3	1	30	7
30	FW	(Brazil)	Lucas Braga	21+11	3	9+3	1	2+3	0	6+2	0	57	6
23	FW	(Brazil)	Marcos Guilherme	0+1	0	5+4	2	2	0	1	0	13	2
9	FW	(Brazil)	Marcos Leonardo	34+1	12	11+1	4	5+1	2	3+1	1	56	21
12	FW	(Brazil)	Rwan Seco	2+14	2	0+4	0	0+3	1	2+4	1	29	4
39	FW	(Brazil)	Tailson	0+3	0	0+2	0	0	0	0	0	5	0
36	FW	(Brazil)	Weslley Patati	0+1	0	0	0	0+1	0	0	0	2	0
10	FW	(Venezuela)	Yeferson Soteldo	7	0	0	0	0	0	0	0	7	0

Source: Match reports in Competitive matches, Soccerway

=== Goalscorers ===
Ran	No.	Pos	Nat	Name	Brasileirão	Paulista	Copa do Brasil	Copa Sudamericana	Total
1	9	FW	(Brazil)	Marcos Leonardo	13	4	2	2	21
2	92	FW	(Brazil)	Léo Baptistão	4	1	0	1	6
2	30	FW	(Brazil)	Lucas Braga	5	1	0	0	6
2	25	MF	(Brazil)	Vinicius Zanocelo	4	1	1	0	6
3	15	FW	(Ecuador)	Bryan Angulo	2	0	0	3	5
4	21	MF	(Brazil)	Lucas Barbosa	2	1	0	1	4
4	13	DF	(Brazil)	Madson	2	1	1	0	4
4	10	MF	(China)	Ricardo Goulart	0	3	1	0	4
4	12	FW	(Brazil)	Rwan Seco	2	0	1	1	4
5	11	FW	(Brazil)	Ângelo	1	0	1	0	2
5	4	DF	(Brazil)	Eduardo Bauermann	1	1	0	0	2
5	23	FW	(Brazil)	Marcos Guilherme	0	2	0	0	2
6	31	DF	(Brazil)	Alex	1	0	0	0	1
6	5	MF	(Brazil)	Gabriel Carabajal	1	0	0	0	1
6	8	MF	(Ecuador)	Jhojan Julio	0	0	0	1	1
6	28	DF	(Brazil)	Kaiky	0	1	0	0	1
6	20	MF	(Brazil)	Luan	1	0	0	0	1
6	2	DF	(Brazil)	Luiz Felipe	1	0	0	0	1
6	14	MF	(Uruguay)	Rodrigo Fernández	0	0	1	0	1
Own goals					3	0	0	0	3
Total					44	16	8	9	77

Source: Match reports in Competitive matches

=== Disciplinary record ===
N	Nat	Pos	Name	Brasileirão			Paulista			Copa do Brasil			Sudamericana			Total		
N	Nat	Pos	Name	Yellow card	(yellow card) (yellow-red card)	Red card	Yellow card	(yellow card) (yellow-red card)	Red card	Yellow card	(yellow card) (yellow-red card)	Red card	Yellow card	(yellow card) (yellow-red card)	Red card	Yellow card	(yellow card) (yellow-red card)	Red card
25	(Brazil)	MF	Vinicius Zanocelo	9	0	0	5	0	0	1	0	1	2	0	0	17	0	1
14	(Uruguay)	MF	Rodrigo Fernández	14	0	0	0	0	0	2	0	0	1	0	1	17	0	1
29	(Brazil)	MF	Camacho	8	0	0	5	0	0	1	1	0	1	0	0	15	1	0
4	(Brazil)	DF	Eduardo Bauermann	7	0	1	1	1	0	0	0	0	1	0	0	9	1	1
21	(Brazil)	MF	Lucas Barbosa	4	0	1	2	0	0	0	0	0	3	0	0	9	0	1
44	(Brazil)	DF	Lucas Pires	2	0	1	2	0	0	3	0	0	1	0	0	8	0	1
9	(Brazil)	FW	Marcos Leonardo	8	0	0	0	0	0	2	0	0	1	0	0	11	0	0
34	(Brazil)	GK	João Paulo	5	0	0	0	0	0	1	0	0	3	0	0	9	0	0
11	(Brazil)	FW	Ângelo	5	0	0	0	0	0	2	0	0	0	0	0	7	0	0
13	(Brazil)	DF	Madson	6	0	0	0	0	0	0	0	0	1	0	0	7	0	0
92	(Brazil)	FW	Léo Baptistão	1	0	0	0	0	0	0	0	0	2	0	1	3	0	1
61	(Uruguay)	DF	Emiliano Velázquez	0	0	0	1	1	0	0	0	0	1	0	0	2	1	0
3	(Brazil)	DF	Felipe Jonatan	3	0	0	0	0	0	1	0	0	1	0	0	5	0	0
27	(Brazil)	DF	Auro	3	0	0	1	0	0	0	0	0	0	0	0	4	0	0
28	(Brazil)	DF	Kaiky	0	0	0	2	0	0	2	0	0	0	0	0	4	0	0
10	(China)	MF	Ricardo Goulart	2	0	0	0	0	0	1	0	0	1	0	0	4	0	0
6	(Brazil)	MF	Sandry	2	0	0	2	0	0	0	0	0	0	0	0	4	0	0
20	(Brazil)	MF	Gabriel Pirani	0	0	0	0	0	1	0	0	0	0	0	0	0	0	1
22	(Brazil)	GK	John	0	0	0	0	0	0	0	0	0	0	0	1	0	0	1
7	(Uruguay)	MF	Carlos Sánchez	3	0	0	0	0	0	0	0	0	0	0	0	3	0	0
8	(Ecuador)	MF	Jhojan Julio	2	0	0	0	0	0	1	0	0	0	0	0	3	0	0
30	(Brazil)	MF	Lucas Braga	3	0	0	0	0	0	0	0	0	0	0	0	3	0	0
2	(Brazil)	DF	Luiz Felipe	3	0	0	0	0	0	0	0	0	0	0	0	3	0	0
17	(Brazil)	MF	Vinicius Balieiro	0	0	0	2	0	0	0	0	0	1	0	0	3	0	0
40	(Brazil)	MF	Bruno Oliveira	2	0	0	0	0	0	0	0	0	0	0	0	2	0	0
5	(Argentina)	MF	Gabriel Carabajal	2	0	0	0	0	0	0	0	0	0	0	0	2	0	0
33	(Brazil)	DF	Maicon	1	0	0	0	0	0	1	0	0	0	0	0	2	0	0
12	(Brazil)	FW	Rwan Seco	1	0	0	1	0	0	0	0	0	0	0	0	2	0	0
5	(Brazil)	MF	Willian Maranhão	0	0	0	0	0	0	0	0	0	2	0	0	2	0	0
31	(Brazil)	DF	Alex	1	0	0	0	0	0	0	0	0	0	0	0	1	0	0
23	(Brazil)	MF	Marcos Guilherme	0	0	0	1	0	0	0	0	0	0	0	0	1	0	0
16	(Brazil)	DF	Nathan Santos	1	0	1	0	0	0	0	0	0	0	0	0	1	0	1
10	(Venezuela)	FW	Yeferson Soteldo	1	0	0	0	0	0	0	0	0	0	0	0	1	0	0
TOTALS				99	0	4	25	2	1	18	1	1	22	0	3	164	3	9

Source: Match reports in Competitive matches
(yellow card) = Number of bookings; (yellow card) (yellow-red card) = Number of sending offs after a second yellow card; (red card) = Number of sending offs by a direct red card.

=== Suspensions served ===
Date	Matches Missed	Player	Reason	Opponents Missed	Competition
29 January	1	Gabriel Pirani	(red card) vs Inter de Limeira	Botafogo-SP (H)	Campeonato Paulista
10 February	1	Camacho	3x (yellow card)	Ituano (H)	Campeonato Paulista
20 February	1	Vinicius Zanocelo	3x (yellow card)	Novorizontino (H)	Campeonato Paulista
8 March	1	Camacho	(red card) vs Fluminense-PI	Coritiba (A)	Copa do Brasil
13 March	1	Emiliano Velázquez	(red card) vs Palmeiras	Ferroviária (A)	Campeonato Paulista
18 May	3	Léo Baptistão	(red card) vs Unión La Calera	Banfield (H); Deportivo Táchira (A); Deportivo Táchira (H)	Copa Sudamericana
18 May	3	John	(red card) vs Unión La Calera	Banfield (H); Deportivo Táchira (A); Deportivo Táchira (H)	Copa Sudamericana
24 May	1	Lucas Barbosa	3x (yellow card)	Deportivo Táchira (A)	Copa Sudamericana
29 May	1	Rodrigo Fernández	3x (yellow card)	Athletico Paranaense (A)	Campeonato Brasileiro
29 May	1	Madson	3x (yellow card)	Athletico Paranaense (A)	Campeonato Brasileiro
4 June	1	Marcos Leonardo	3x (yellow card)	Internacional (H)	Campeonato Brasileiro
11 June	1	Lucas Pires	(red card) vs Atlético Mineiro	Juventude (A)	Campeonato Brasileiro
14 June	1	Auro	3x (yellow card)	Red Bull Bragantino (H)	Campeonato Brasileiro
18 June	1	Vinicius Zanocelo	3x (yellow card)	Corinthians (A)	Campeonato Brasileiro
18 June	1	João Paulo	3x (yellow card)	Corinthians (A)	Campeonato Brasileiro
22 June	1	Vinicius Zanocelo	(red card) vs Corinthians	Corinthians (H)	Copa do Brasil
25 June	1	Rodrigo Fernández	3x (yellow card)	Flamengo (H)	Campeonato Brasileiro
2 July	1	Ângelo	3x (yellow card)	Atlético Goianiense (H)	Campeonato Brasileiro
20 July	1	Vinicius Zanocelo	3x (yellow card)	Fortaleza (A)	Campeonato Brasileiro
24 July	1	Eduardo Bauermann	3x (yellow card)	Fluminense (H)	Campeonato Brasileiro
1 August	1	Camacho	3x (yellow card)	Coritiba (A)	Campeonato Brasileiro
21 August	1	Marcos Leonardo	3x (yellow card)	Cuiabá (A)	Campeonato Brasileiro
27 September	1	Felipe Jonatan	3x (yellow card)	Internacional (A)	Campeonato Brasileiro
1 October	1	Camacho	3x (yellow card)	Atlético Mineiro (H)	Campeonato Brasileiro
5 October	1	Nathan Santos	(red card) vs Atlético Mineiro	Juventude (H)	Campeonato Brasileiro
10 October	1	Rodrigo Fernández	3x (yellow card)	Red Bull Bragantino (A)	Campeonato Brasileiro
17 October	1	Eduardo Bauermann	3x (yellow card)	Corinthians (H)	Campeonato Brasileiro
22 October	1	Lucas Barbosa	(red card) vs Corinthians	Flamengo (A)	Campeonato Brasileiro
22 October	1	Lucas Braga	3x (yellow card)	Flamengo (A)	Campeonato Brasileiro
25 October	1	Madson	3x (yellow card)	Atlético Goianiense (A)	Campeonato Brasileiro
2 November	1	Carlos Sánchez	3x (yellow card)	Avaí (H)	Campeonato Brasileiro
5 November	1	Luiz Felipe	3x (yellow card)	Botafogo (A)	Campeonato Brasileiro
5 November	1	Rodrigo Fernández	3x (yellow card)	Botafogo (A)	Campeonato Brasileiro
5 November	1	Vinicius Zanocelo	3x (yellow card)	Botafogo (A)	Campeonato Brasileiro
10 November	1	Eduardo Bauermann	(red card) vs Botafogo	Fortaleza (H)	Campeonato Brasileiro

Source: Match reports in Competitive matches

== Managers ==
Name	Nat.	Place of Birth	Date of Birth (Age)	Signed from	Date signed	Role	G	W	D	L	%	Departure	Manner	Contract End
Fábio Carille	(Brazil)	São Paulo (São Paulo (state))	26 September 1973 (age 53)	Free agent	8 September 2021	Permanent	5	2	2	1	40.00	18 February 2022	Mutual agreement	31 December 2022
Leandro Cuca	(Brazil)	Blumenau (Santa Catarina (state))	24 August 1973 (age 53)	Staff	26 January 2022	Interim (Note: Interim for the matches against Inter de Limeira and Botafogo-SP as Carille tested positive for COVID-19)	2	0	1	1	0.00	30 January 2022	Return (Note: Back to assistant role after the match)	—N/a
Marcelo Fernandes	(Brazil)	Santos (São Paulo (state))	20 April 1971 (age 55)	Staff	18 February 2022	Interim	3	1	1	1	33.33	27 February 2022	Return	—N/a
Fabián Bustos	(Argentina)	Córdoba	28 March 1969 (age 57)	Barcelona SC (Ecuador)	25 February 2022 (Note: Bustos was announced as manager on 25 February, but took over only on 28 February)	Permanent	28	8	12	8	28.57	7 July 2022	Sacked	31 December 2023
Lucas Ochandorena	(Argentina)	La Plata	4 March 1985 (age 41)	Staff	12 May 2022	Interim (Note: Interim for the match against Coritiba as Bustos was suspended)	1	1	0	0	100.00	12 May 2022	Return	—N/a
Lucas Ochandorena	(Argentina)	La Plata	4 March 1985 (age 41)	Staff	26 June 2022	Interim (Note: Interim for the match against Corinthians as Bustos was suspended)	1	0	1	0	0.00	26 June 2022	Return	—N/a
Marcelo Fernandes	(Brazil)	Santos (São Paulo (state))	20 April 1971 (age 55)	Staff	10 July 2022	Interim	4	3	0	1	75.00	20 July 2022	Return	—N/a
Lisca	(Brazil)	Porto Alegre (Rio Grande do Sul)	11 August 1972 (age 54)	Sport	20 July 2022	Permanent	8	2	3	3	25.00	12 September 2022	Mutual agreement	31 December 2023
Orlando Ribeiro	(Brazil)	São Paulo (São Paulo (state))	9 January 1967 (age 59)	Staff	12 September 2022	Interim	12	4	1	7	33.33	13 November 2022	Return	—N/a

== Transfers ==
=== Transfers in ===
N.	Pos.	Name	Age	Moving from	Type	Fee	Source
—	RB	(Brazil) Daniel Guedes	27	Fortaleza	Loan return	Free	
—	LB	(Brazil) Romário	29	Coritiba	Loan return	Free	
—	DM	(Brazil) Guilherme Nunes	23	Náutico	Loan return	Free	
39	SS	(Brazil) Tailson	22	Náutico	Loan return	Free	
49	SS	(Brazil) Allanzinho	21	Guarani	Loan return	Free	
—	ST	(Brazil) Rodrigão	28	Ponte Preta	Loan return	Free	
4	CB	(Brazil) Eduardo Bauermann	25	América Mineiro	Transfer	Free	
10	AM	(China) Ricardo Goulart	30	Guangzhou (China)	Transfer	Free	
33	CB	(Brazil) Maicon	33	Cruzeiro	Transfer	Free	
5	DM	(Brazil) Willian Maranhão	26	Bahia	Transfer	R$ 500K	
15	ST	(Ecuador) Bryan Angulo	26	Cruz Azul (Mexico)	Transfer	Free	
31	CB	(Brazil) Alex	23	Famalicão (Portugal)	Loan return	Free	
16	RB	(Brazil) Nathan Santos	20	Boavista (Portugal)	Transfer	Undisc.	
5	MF	(Argentina) Gabriel Carabajal	30	Argentinos Juniors (Argentina)	Transfer	R$ 8M	

=== Loans in ===
N.	Pos.	Name	Age	Loaned from	Loan expires	Fee	Source
40	AM	(Brazil) Bruno Oliveira	23	Caldense	December 2022	Free	
27	RB	(Brazil) Auro	26	Toronto FC (Canada)	December 2022	Free	
14	DM	(Uruguay) Rodrigo Fernández	26	Guaraní (Paraguay)	December 2022	Free	
8	AM	(Ecuador) Jhojan Julio	24	LDU (Ecuador)	May 2023	Free	
20	AM	(Brazil) Luan	29	Corinthians	December 2022	Free	
10	FW	(Venezuela) Yeferson Soteldo	25	Tigres (Mexico)	July 2023	Free	

=== Transfers out ===
N.	Pos.	Name	Age	Moving to	Type	Fee	Source
—	RB	(Brazil) Fernando Pileggi	22	Free agent	Contract terminated	Free	
41	MF	(Brazil) Jean Mota	28	Inter Miami (United States)	Transfer	US$ 500K	
21	RB	(Brazil) Pará	35	Cruzeiro	Contract terminated	Free	
99	ST	(Brazil) Diego Tardelli	36	Free agent	End of contract	Free	
22	CB	(Brazil) Danilo Boza	23	Mirassol	Loan return	Free	
93	GK	(Brazil) Jandrei	28	São Paulo	Contract terminated	Free	
49	FW	(Brazil) Lucas Venuto	26	Guarani	Contract terminated	Free	
42	LB	(Brazil) Moraes	24	Juventude	Contract terminated	Free	
11	FW	(Brazil) Marinho	31	Flamengo	Transfer	US$ 1.3M	
37	MF	(Venezuela) Matías Lacava	19	Academia Puerto Cabello (Venezuela)	Loan return	Free	
—	FW	(Brazil) Rodrigão	28	Sport Recife	Contract terminated	Free	
—	DF	(Brazil) Cléber Reis	31	Free agent	Contract terminated	Free	
33	RB	(Brazil) Sandro Perpétuo	20	Atlético Mineiro	Contract terminated	Free	
—	RB	(Brazil) Daniel Guedes	27	Free agent	Contract terminated	Free	
23	MF	(Brazil) Marcos Guilherme	26	São Paulo	End of loan	Free	
18	MF	(Brazil) Augusto	23	Real Madrid (Spain)	Loan return	Free	
61	DF	(Uruguay) Emiliano Velázquez	28	Free agent	Contract terminated	Free	
10	AM	(China) Ricardo Goulart	31	Free agent	Contract terminated	Free	
28	DF	(Brazil) Kaiky	18	Almería (Spain)	Transfer	€ 7M	
92	FW	(Brazil) Léo Baptistão	29	Almería (Spain)	Transfer	Undisc.	

=== Loans out ===
N.	P	Name	Age	Loaned to	Loan expires	Source
—	LB	(Brazil) Romário	29	Operário Ferroviário	December 2022	
—	AM	(Brazil) Lucas Lourenço	20	Santo André	April 2022	
14	CB	(Brazil) Wagner Leonardo	22	Fortaleza	March 2023	
40	AM	(Brazil) Anderson Ceará	22	Maringá	April 2022	
12	FW	(Brazil) Raniel	25	Vasco da Gama	December 2022	
19	FW	(Brazil) Bruno Marques	22	Arouca (Portugal)	June 2023	
—	DM	(Brazil) Guilherme Nunes	23	Ferroviária	April 2022	
47	AM	(Brazil) Luiz Henrique	22	Novorizontino	December 2022	
—	DM	(Brazil) Guilherme Nunes	23	ABC	December 2022	
20	AM	(Brazil) Gabriel Pirani	20	Cuiabá	December 2022	
32	CB	(Brazil) Jhonnathan	21	Brasil de Pelotas	December 2022	
26	CB	(Brazil) Robson Reis	22	Boavista (Portugal)	May 2023	
—	DM	(Brazil) Jobson	26	Náutico	December 2022	
—	AM	(Brazil) Lucas Lourenço	21	CSA	December 2022	
5	DM	(Brazil) Willian Maranhão	26	Atlético Goianiense	December 2022	

== Competitions ==
=== Overview ===
Competition	First match	Last match	Starting round	Final position	Record							
Competition	First match	Last match	Starting round	Final position	Pld	W	D	L	GF	GA	GD	Win %
Série A	9 April 2022	13 November 2022	Matchday 1	12th	38	12	11	15	44	41	+3	31.58
Copa do Brasil	23 February 2022	13 July 2022	First round	Round of 16	6	3	1	2	8	6	+2	50.00
Campeonato Paulista	26 January 2022	19 March 2022	Matchday 1	Group stage	12	3	5	4	16	19	−3	25.00
Copa Sudamericana	5 April 2022	6 July 2022	Group stage	Round of 16	8	3	4	1	9	7	+2	37.50
Total					64	21	21	22	77	73	+4	32.81

Source: Competitions

=== Campeonato Paulista ===
==== Results summary ====
Overall								Home						Away					
Pld	W	D	L	GF	GA	GD	Pts	W	D	L	GF	GA	GD	W	D	L	GF	GA	GD
12	3	5	4	16	19	−3	14	2	2	2	8	10	−2	1	3	2	8	9	−1

Source: Globo Esporte

==== Group stage ====
Pos	Team	Pld	W	D	L	GF	GA	GD	Pts	Qualification or relegation
1	Red Bull Bragantino	12	6	2	4	19	13	+6	20	Knockout stage
2	Santo André	12	3	6	3	11	10	+1	15	Knockout stage
3	Santos	12	3	5	4	16	19	−3	14	
4	Ponte Preta	12	2	3	7	10	23	−13	9	Relegation to Série A2

Source: Soccerway

==== Matches ====
26 January 1	Internacional	0–0	Santos	Limeira
19:00 UTC-03:00	Léo Duarte (yellow card) 41'; Jhony (yellow card) 59'; Geovane (yellow card) 79'	Report	(yellow card) 30' Camacho; (red card) 45+4' Pirani	Stadium: Major José Levy Sobrinho; Referee: Vinícius Gonçalves Dias Araújo

29 January 2	Santos	0–1	Botafogo–SP	Santos
11:00 UTC-03:00		Report	(yellow card) 24' Marlon; (yellow card) 62' Jean Victor; 62' Matheus Carvalho	Stadium: Vila Belmiro; Referee: Raphael Claus

2 February 3	Corinthians	1–2	Santos	São Paulo
21:35 UTC-03:00	Jô 52'; João Victor (yellow card) 90+2'	Report	(yellow card) 32' Kaiky; 65', 70' (pen.) Marcos Leonardo; (yellow card) 70' Zanocelo	Stadium: Arena Corinthians; Attendance: 28,091; Referee: Thiago Luis Scarascati

6 February 4	Guarani	1–1	Santos	Campinas
16:00 UTC-03:00	Giovanni Augusto 59' (pen.), (yellow card) 62'; Matheus Pereira (yellow card) 61'	Report	20' Bauermann; (yellow card) 74' Camacho; (yellow card) 90+4' Balieiro	Stadium: Brinco de Ouro da Princesa; Referee: Douglas Marques das Flores

10 February 5	Santos	1–1	São Bernardo	Santos
19:00 UTC-03:00	Marcos Leonardo 26'; Camacho (yellow card) 41'; Kaiky (yellow card) 45+3'; Marcos Guilherme (yellow card) 75'	Report	(yellow card) 28' Ligger; (yellow card) 29' Rodrigo Souza; 66' Silvinho	Stadium: Vila Belmiro; Referee: Luiz Flávio de Oliveira

13 February 6	Santos	2–1	Ituano	Santos
16:00 UTC-03:00	Marcos Guilherme 19'; Zanocelo (yellow card) 41'; Ricardo Goulart 70'; Sandry (yellow card) 85'; Lucas Barbosa (yellow card) 88'	Report	(yellow card) 30', (goal) 53' Kaio Mendes; (yellow card) 90+2' Igor Henrique	Stadium: Vila Belmiro; Referee: Vinícius Gonçalves Dias Araíjo

17 February 7	Mirassol	3–2	Santos	Mirassol
19:00 UTC-03:00	Zeca 23'; Fabrício Daniel 26', (yellow card) 35'; Rafael Silva 35'; Oyama (yellow card) 65'; Daniel (yellow card) 86'; Darley (yellow card) 90+1'	Report	(yellow card) 19' Balieiro; (yellow card) 45+4' Camacho; 50' Madson; 59' Marcos Guilherme	Stadium: José Maria de Campos Maia; Referee: Thiago Luís Scarascati

20 February 8	Santos	0–3	São Paulo	Santos
18:30 UTC-03:00	Lucas Pires (yellow card) 53'; Zanocelo (yellow card) 83'	Report	22', (yellow card) 51' Éder; (yellow card) 43' Diego Costa; 66' (o.g.) Bauermann; 71' Rodrigo Nestor	Stadium: Vila Belmiro; Referee: Edina Alves Batista

27 February 9	Santos	2–2	Novorizontino	Santos
18:30 UTC-03:00	Ricardo Goulart 11'; Lucas Barbosa 74', (yellow card) 90+5'	Report	53' (pen.) Douglas Baggio; 84' Marcinho; (yellow card) 86' Wálber; (yellow card) 90+4' Chrigor	Stadium: Vila Belmiro; Referee: Flávio Rodrigues de Souza

13 March 11	Palmeiras	1–0	Santos	São Paulo
18:30 UTC-03:00	Raphael Veiga 45+5' (pen.); Marcos Rocha (yellow card) 62'	Report	(yellow card) 18' Auro; (yellow card) 37' (yellow-red card) 45+2' Velázquez; (yellow card) 64' Lucas Pires	Stadium: Allianz Parque; Attendance: 38,381; Referee: Raphael Claus

16 March 10	Ferroviária	3–3	Santos	Araraquara
19:00 UTC-03:00	Hygor 33'; Thomaz 45', (yellow card) 52'; Cristiano (yellow card) 74'; Bruno Mezenga 90' (pen.); Arthur (yellow card) 90+5'	Report	28' Lucas Braga; (yellow card) 30' Zanocelo; 45+3' Marcos Leonardo; (yellow card) 53' Camacho; (yellow card) 79' Sandry; 90+3' Léo Baptistão	Stadium: Fonte Luminosa; Referee: Luiz Flávio de Oliveira
Note: The match, originally scheduled for 5 March, was postponed due to a power outage at the Estádio Fonte Luminosa.

19 March 12	Santos	3–2	Água Santa	Santos
16:00 UTC-03:00	Zanocelo 12', (yellow card) 22'; Ricardo Goulart 16'; Kaiky 29'; Bauermann (yellow card) 52' (yellow-red card) 84'; Rwan (yellow card) 90+1'	Report	10' Dadá Belmonte; (yellow card) 31', (goal) 86' Rodrigo Sam; (yellow card) 37' Fernandinho	Stadium: Vila Belmiro; Referee: Vinícius Gonçalves Dias Araújo

=== Copa Sudamericana ===
==== Group stage ====
Pos	Team	Pld	W	D	L	GF	GA	GD	Pts	Qualification
1	(Brazil) Santos	6	3	2	1	7	5	+2	11	Round of 16
2	(Chile) Unión La Calera	6	3	2	1	6	4	+2	11	
3	(Ecuador) Universidad Católica	6	1	2	3	7	8	−1	5	
4	(Argentina) Banfield	6	1	2	3	3	6	−3	5	

Source: CONMEBOL

5 April 1	Banfield (Argentina)	1–0	(Brazil) Santos	Banfield, Argentina
19:15 UTC−03:00	Urzi 44', (yellow card) 80'; Domingo (yellow card) 56' (yellow-red card) 87'; Abecasis (yellow card) 67'; Lollo (yellow card) 84'	Report	(yellow card) 23' Willian Maranhão; (yellow card) 50' Lucas Barbosa; (yellow card) 64' Felipe Jonatan; (yellow card) 88' Zanocelo; (yellow card) 89' Velázquez	Stadium: Estadio Florencio Sola; Referee: Derlis López (Paraguay)

13 April 2	Santos (Brazil)	3–2	(Ecuador) Universidad Católica	Santos, Brazil
19:15 UTC−03:00	Willian Maranhão (yellow card) 7'; Julio 15'; Léo Baptistão 78' (pen.); Angulo 85'; João Paulo (yellow card) 90'	Report	26' Martínez Borja; 42' Minda; (yellow card) 72' Cevallos; (yellow card) 76' Mosquera; (yellow card) 80' Facundo Martínez; (yellow card) 90+5' Anangonó	Stadium: Vila Belmiro; Referee: José Argote (Venezuela)

28 April 3	Unión La Calera (Chile)	1–1	(Brazil) Santos	Viña del Mar, Chile
21:30 UTC−03:00	Valencia 25'; Passerini (yellow card) 67'; Wiemberg (yellow card) 73'	Report	10' Angulo; (yellow card) 39' Bauermann; (yellow card) 57' Zanocelo; (yellow card) 63' Madson; (yellow card) 87' Léo Baptistão	Stadium: Estadio Sausalito; Referee: Ángel Arteaga (Venezuela)

5 May 4	Universidad Católica (Ecuador)	0–1	(Brazil) Santos	Quito, Ecuador
21:30 UTC−03:00	Mosquera (yellow card) 68'	Report	90+1' Rwan	Stadium: Estadio Olímpico Atahualpa; Referee: Gery Vargas (Bolivia)

18 May 5	Santos (Brazil)	1–0	(Chile) Unión La Calera	Santos, Brazil
21:30 UTC−03:00	Camacho (yellow card) 38'; Lucas Barbosa (yellow card) 78', (goal) 90+12'; Léo Baptistão (yellow card) 90+4', (red card) 90+8'; João Paulo (yellow card) 90+10'; Rodrigo Fernández (yellow card) 90+10'; John (red card) 90+13'	Report	(yellow card) 11' Sanhueza; (yellow card) 24' Vidangossy; (yellow card) 75' Oyanedel; (yellow card) 90+4' Alarcón; (red card) 90+8' Ramírez	Stadium: Vila Belmiro; Attendance: 11,110; Referee: Jesús Valenzuela (Venezuela)
Note: John was sent off on the bench

24 May 6	Santos (Brazil)	1–1	(Argentina) Banfield	Santos, Brazil
19:15 UTC−03:00	Marcos Leonardo 37' (pen.); Ricardo Goulart (yellow card) 64'; Lucas Barbosa (yellow card) 79'	Report	(yellow card) 16' (yellow-red card) 54' Dátolo; (yellow card) 34' (yellow-red card) 61' Tanco; 45+1' Domingo; (yellow card) 90+1' Coronel	Stadium: Vila Belmiro; Referee: Augusto Menéndez (Peru)

==== Round of 16 ====
The draw for the final stage was held on 27 May 2022.

29 June First leg	Deportivo Táchira (Venezuela)	1–1	(Brazil) Santos	San Cristóbal, Venezuela
21:30 UTC−3	Flores (yellow card) 11'; Zanocelo 30' (o.g.); Marrufo (yellow card) 90+2'	Report	(yellow card) 25' Balieiro; 86' Angulo	Stadium: Pueblo Nuevo; Referee: Gery Vargas (Bolivia)

6 July Second leg	Santos (Brazil)	1–1 (2–2 agg.) (2–4 p)	(Venezuela) Deportivo Táchira	Santos, Brazil
21:30 UTC−3	Marcos Leonardo (yellow card) 42', (goal) 69'; Rodrigo Fernández (red card) 45+3'; João Paulo (yellow card) 45+5'; Lucas Pires (yellow card) 71'	Report	(yellow card) 6' Flores; (yellow card) 24' Cova; 27', (yellow card) 52' Uribe; (yellow card) 59' Chacón; (yellow card) 84' Ariano	Stadium: Vila Belmiro; Attendance: 11,081; Referee: Kevin Ortega (Peru)
	Penalties
	Ricardo Goulart (penalty missed); Sandry (penalty scored); Carlos Sánchez (penalty scored); Lucas Barbosa (penalty missed)		(penalty scored) Farías; (penalty scored) Simisterra; (penalty scored) Arace; (penalty scored) Fernández

=== Campeonato Brasileiro ===
==== Results summary ====
Overall								Home						Away					
Pld	W	D	L	GF	GA	GD	Pts	W	D	L	GF	GA	GD	W	D	L	GF	GA	GD
38	12	11	15	44	41	+3	47	8	5	6	28	19	+9	4	6	9	16	22	−6

Source: Soccerway

==== Results by round ====
Round	1	2	3	4	5	6	7	8	9	10	11	12	13	14	15	16	17	18	19	20	21	22	23	24	25	26	27	28	29	30	31	32	33	34	35	36	37	38
Ground	A	H	H	A	H	A	H	H	A	H	A	A	H	A	H	H	A	H	A	H	A	A	H	A	H	A	A	H	A	H	H	A	H	A	A	H	A	H
Result	D	W	W	L	W	L	D	L	D	D	D	W	D	D	L	W	L	W	D	D	W	L	W	D	L	L	L	W	L	L	W	W	L	L	W	D	L	L
Position	12	5	1	6	2	5	6	9	9	10	11	8	8	7	10	8	10	9	9	9	9	10	8	8	10	10	11	10	11	14	11	11	12	12	12	12	12	12

Source: Globo Esporte
P = Postponed

==== League table ====
Pos	Team	Pld	W	D	L	GF	GA	GD	Pts	Qualification or relegation
10	América Mineiro	38	15	8	15	40	40	0	53	Qualification for Copa Sudamericana group stage
11	Botafogo	38	15	8	15	41	43	−2	53	Qualification for Copa Sudamericana group stage
12	Santos	38	12	11	15	44	41	+3	47	Qualification for Copa Sudamericana group stage
13	Goiás	38	11	13	14	40	53	−13	46	Qualification for Copa Sudamericana group stage
14	Red Bull Bragantino	38	11	11	16	49	59	−10	44	Qualification for Copa Sudamericana group stage

Source: CBF
Rules for classification: 1) points; 2) wins; 3) goal difference; 4) goals scored; 5) head-to-head results (only between two teams); 6) fewest red cards; 7) fewest yellow cards; 8) drawing of lots.

==== Matches ====
9 April 1	Fluminense	0–0	Santos	Rio de Janeiro
16:30 UTC-03:00	Manoel (yellow card) 47'	Report		Stadium: Maracanã; Attendance: 22,855; Referee: Anderson Daronco

17 April 2	Santos	2–1	Coritiba	Santos
11:00 UTC-03:00	Léo Baptistão 12'; Henrique 32' (o.g.); Bauermann (yellow card) 56'; Madson (yellow card) 61'	Report	(yellow card) 22' Alef Manga; 28' (pen.) Léo Gamalho; (yellow card) 51' Guillermo de los Santos; (yellow card) 62' Andrey; (yellow card) 90' Igor Paixão	Stadium: Vila Belmiro; Attendance: 13,052; Referee: Wagner do Nascimento Magalhães

24 April 3	Santos	3–0	América Mineiro	Santos
16:00 UTC-03:00	Marcos Leonardo 29', (yellow card) 57'; Rodrigo Fernández (yellow card) 49'; Zanocelo 51', 78'	Report		Stadium: Vila Belmiro; Attendance: 10,374; Referee: Wilton Pereira Sampaio

2 May 4	São Paulo	2–1	Santos	São Paulo
20:00 UTC-03:00	Calleri 10'; Rafinha (yellow card) 68'; Luciano 82' (pen.); Alisson (yellow card) 90+7'	Report	45+1', (yellow card) 66' Marcos Leonardo; (yellow card) 84' Madson; (yellow card) 90+2' Rodrigo Fernández; (yellow card) 90+6' Lucas Pires	Stadium: Morumbi; Attendance: 36,746; Referee: Leandro Vuaden

8 May 5	Santos	4–1	Cuiabá	Santos
18:00 UTC-03:00	Léo Baptistão 3'; Marcos Leonardo 37'; Zanocelo (yellow card) 69'; Bryan Angulo 76'; Rwan 78'	Report	11' Alesson; (yellow card) 28' Cristhian Rivas; (yellow card) 60' Everton	Stadium: Vila Belmiro; Attendance: 7,256; Referee: Bráulio da Silva Machado

15 May 6	Goiás	1–0	Santos	Goiânia
19:00 UTC-03:00	Élvis 19' (pen.)	Report		Stadium: Estádio da Serrinha; Attendance: 9,538; Referee: Marcelo de Lima Henrique

21 May 7	Santos	0–0	Ceará	Barueri
18:30 UTC-03:00	Jhojan Julio (yellow card) 45'	Report	(yellow card) 58' Erick; (red card) 65' Richard Coelho; (yellow card) 67' Zé Roberto; (yellow card) 78' João Ricardo; (yellow card) 83' Rodrigo Lindoso; (yellow card) 90+1' Nino Paraíba	Stadium: Arena Barueri; Attendance: 25,797; Referee: Sávio Pereira Sampaio

29 May 8	Santos	0–1	Palmeiras	Santos
16:00 UTC-03:00	Rodrigo Fernández (yellow card) 70'; Madson (yellow card) 73'; João Paulo (yellow card) 81'; Bruno Oliveira (yellow card) 85'; Zanocelo (yellow card) 89'	Report	(yellow card) 59' Gabriel Menino; (penalty missed) 73' Raphael Veiga; 80' Gustavo Gómez	Stadium: Vila Belmiro; Attendance: 14,220; Referee: Luiz Flávio de Oliveira

4 June 9	Athletico Paranaense	2–2	Santos	Curitiba
19:00 UTC-03:00	Nicolás Hernández (yellow card) 8'; Christian (yellow card) 25'; Pablo 43', (yellow card) 44'; Léo Baptistão 56' (o.g.); Tomás Cuello (yellow card) 69'; Hugo Moura (yellow card) 83'	Report	11', 64', (yellow card) 53' Marcos Leonardo; (yellow card) 39' Auro; (yellow card) 55' Jhojan Julio	Stadium: Arena da Baixada; Attendance: 20,466; Referee: Bráulio da Silva Machado

8 June 10	Santos	1–1	Internacional	Santos
21:30 UTC-03:00	Madson (yellow card) 52'; Lucas Braga 63'; Rodrigo Fernández (yellow card) 77'	Report	(yellow card) 22' Edenílson; 71' Bruno Méndez	Stadium: Vila Belmiro; Attendance: 8,845; Referee: Ramon Abatti Abel

11 June 11	Atlético Mineiro	1–1	Santos	Belo Horizonte
19:00 UTC-03:00	Sávio 6'; Guilherme Arana (yellow card) 64'; Jair (yellow card) 77'; Allan (yellow card) 78'; Everson (yellow card) 84'	Report	(red card) 60' Lucas Pires; (yellow card) 78' Ângelo; (yellow card) 80' João Paulo; 84' (pen.) Rwan; (yellow card) 90' Ricardo Goulart; (yellow card) 90' Auro	Stadium: Mineirão; Attendance: 26,299; Referee: Marcelo de Lima Henrique

14 June 12	Juventude	1–2	Santos	Caxias do Sul
21:30 UTC-03:00	Ricardo Bueno 26'; Yuri (red card) 45+5'; Paulinho Moccelin (yellow card) 90+1'	Report	(yellow card) 21' Auro; 57' Bauermann; 77' Marcos Leonardo; (yellow card) 87' Rodrigo Fernández	Stadium: Estádio Alfredo Jaconi; Attendance: 3,025; Referee: Rodolpho Toski Marques

18 June 13	Santos	2–2	Red Bull Bragantino	Santos
21:00 UTC-03:00	Léo Baptistão 17', 36'; Vinicius Zanocelo (yellow card) 23'; Bruno Oliveira (yellow card) 25'; João Paulo (yellow card) 56'; Ricardo Goulart (yellow card) 86'	Report	(yellow card) 20' Raul; 45+1' Hyoran; (yellow card) 61' Helinho; 71' Luan Cândido; (yellow card) 80' Bruno Praxedes	Stadium: Vila Belmiro; Attendance: 10,924; Referee: Douglas Marques das Flores

25 June 14	Corinthians	0–0	Santos	São Paulo
19:00 UTC-03:00	Roni (yellow card) 3'; Adson (yellow card) 73'; Fagner (yellow card) 79'	Report	(yellow card) 23' Ângelo; (yellow card) 81' Rodrigo Fernández; (yellow card) 90+5' Rwan	Stadium: Neo Química Arena; Attendance: 41,124; Referee: Flávio Rodrigues de Souza

2 July 15	Santos	1–2	Flamengo	Santos
19:00 UTC-03:00	Felipe Jonatan (yellow card) 23'; Ângelo (yellow card) 43'; Camacho (yellow card) 55'; Zanocelo 66', (yellow card) 70'	Report	18' Pedro; (yellow card) 63' Thiago Maia; (yellow card) 70', (goal) 73' Gabriel Barbosa	Stadium: Vila Belmiro; Attendance: 12,464; Referee: Anderson Daronco

10 July 16	Santos	1–0	Atlético Goianiense	Santos
18:00 UTC-03:00	Zanocelo (yellow card) 17'; Carlos Sánchez (yellow card) 32'; Rodrigo Fernández (yellow card) 49'; Camacho (yellow card) 60'; Lucas Barbosa 76', (yellow card) 89'	Report	(yellow card) 44' Shaylon; (yellow card) 60' Luiz Fernando; (yellow card) 72' Ronaldo; (yellow card) 73' Edson; (yellow card) 90+4' Hayner	Stadium: Vila Belmiro; Attendance: 8,588; Referee: Bráulio da Silva Machado

16 July 17	Avaí	1–0	Santos	Florianópolis
19:00 UTC-03:00	Bissoli 10' (pen.), (yellow card) 88'; Bruno Silva (yellow card) 16'; Bruno Cortez (yellow card) 16'; Eduardo (yellow card) 40'; Raniele (yellow card) 65'	Report	(yellow card) 27' Marcos Leonardo; (yellow card) 56' Léo Baptistão; (yellow card) 76' Bauermann	Stadium: Estádio da Ressacada; Attendance: 8,674; Referee: Paulo Roberto Alves Júnior

20 July 18	Santos	2–0	Botafogo	Santos
21:30 UTC-03:00	Zanocelo (yellow card) 21'; Léo Baptistão 33'; Luiz Felipe (yellow card) 45+2'; Marcos Leonardo 77'	Report	(yellow card) 20' Marçal; (yellow card) 45' Saravia	Stadium: Vila Belmiro; Attendance: 8,453; Referee: Ramon Abatti Abel

24 July 19	Fortaleza	0–0	Santos	Fortaleza
19:00 UTC-03:00	Marcelo Benevenuto (yellow card) 45+2'; Juninho Capixaba (yellow card) 81'; Thiago Galhardo (yellow card) 83'; Lucas Crispim (yellow card) 90'	Report	(yellow card) 38' Marcos Leonardo; (yellow card) 55' Rodrigo Fernández; (yellow card) 58' Ângelo; (yellow card) 83' Bauermann	Stadium: Arena Castelão; Attendance: 19,902; Referee: Wilton Pereira Sampaio

1 August 20	Santos	2–2	Fluminense	Santos
20:00 UTC-03:00	Luiz Felipe 16'; Madson (yellow card) 65'; Camacho (yellow card) 65'; Marcos Leonardo 86'	Report	(yellow card) 70' Caio Paulista; 71' (pen.), (yellow card) 71' Paulo Henrique Ganso; 72' Jhon Arias; (yellow card) 82' André; (yellow card) 90+6' Wellington	Stadium: Vila Belmiro; Attendance: 11,943; Referee: Bráulio da Silva Machado

8 August 21	Coritiba	1–2	Santos	Curitiba
20:00 UTC-03:00	Hernán Pérez (yellow card) 38'; Willian Farias (yellow card) 42'; Léo Gamalho 57'; Alef Manga (yellow card) 90+5'	Report	(yellow card) 41' Maicon; (yellow card) 42' João Paulo; 47' Madson; (yellow card) 85' Lucas Braga; 90+3' Bryan Angulo	Stadium: Estádio Couto Pereira; Referee: Paulo César Zanovelli

14 August 22	América Mineiro	1–0	Santos	Belo Horizonte
18:00 UTC-03:00	Pedrinho 14'; Luan Patrick (yellow card) 87'	Report		Stadium: Estádio Independência; Referee: Paulo Roberto Alves Júnior

21 August 23	Santos	1–0	São Paulo	Santos
19:00 UTC-03:00	Lucas Braga 33'; Bauermann (yellow card) 43'; Marcos Leonardo (yellow card) 45+5'; Felipe Jonatan (yellow card) 81'	Report	(yellow card) 44' Nikão	Stadium: Vila Belmiro; Attendance: 12,598; Referee: Wilton Pereira Sampaio

28 August 24	Cuiabá	0–0	Santos	Cuiabá
18:00 UTC-03:00		Report		Stadium: Arena Pantanal; Referee: Jean Pierre Gonçalves Lima

5 September 25	Santos	1–2	Goiás	Santos
20:00 UTC-03:00	Sávio 55' (o.g.); Carabajal (yellow card) 67'	Report	2', 61' Pedro Raul; (yellow card) 88' Apodi; (yellow card) 90' Sávio	Stadium: Vila Belmiro; Attendance: 11,497; Referee: Anderson Daronco

10 September 26	Ceará	2–1	Santos	Fortaleza
16:30 UTC-03:00	Guilherme Castilho 6'; Nino Paraíba (yellow card) 10'; Zé Roberto 30'; Richardson (yellow card) 38'; Richard (yellow card) 39'; Bruno Pacheco (yellow card) 76'	Report	(yellow card) 39' Bauermann; (yellow card) 54' Lucas Pires; 56' Marcos Leonardo; (yellow card) 61' Camacho	Stadium: Arena Castelão; Referee: Bráulio da Silva Machado

18 September 27	Palmeiras	1–0	Santos	São Paulo
18:30 UTC-03:00	Zé Rafael (yellow card) 55'; Danilo (red card) 60'; Gabriel Menino (yellow card) 75'; Merentiel 77'; Gustavo Gómez (yellow card) 90+1'	Report	(yellow card) 35' Zanocelo; (yellow card) 45+1' Marcos Leonardo; (yellow card) 71' Soteldo; (yellow card) 90+5' Camacho	Stadium: Allianz Parque; Attendance: 40,337; Referee: Wilton Pereira Sampaio

27 September 28	Santos	2–0	Athletico Paranaense	Santos
21:00 UTC-03:00	Luan 35'; Felipe Jonatan (yellow card) 58'; Nathan (yellow card) 84'; Marcos Leonardo (yellow card) 86'; Bento 90+2' (o.g.)	Report	(yellow card) 54' Pablo; (yellow card) 63' Alex Santana; (yellow card) 90' Matheus Felipe	Stadium: Vila Belmiro; Attendance: 7,464; Referee: Bráulio da Silva Machado

1 October 29	Internacional	1–0	Santos	Porto Alegre
15:00 UTC-03:00	de Pena 23'; Johnny Cardoso (yellow card) 35'	Report	(yellow card) 2' Camacho; (yellow card) 78' Carlos Sánchez; (yellow card) 88' Luiz Felipe; (yellow card) 89' Sandry	Stadium: Estádio Beira-Rio; Attendance: 30,858; Referee: Ramon Abatti Abel

5 October 30	Santos	1–2	Atlético Mineiro	Santos
21:30 UTC-03:00	Lucas Braga (yellow card) 80'; Marcos Leonardo 88' (pen.); Nathan (red card) 89'; João Paulo (yellow card) 90+1'	Report	(yellow card) 32' Jemerson; (yellow card) 42' Ademir; 72' Hulk; (yellow card) 87' Everson; (yellow card) 90+2' Allan; 90+2' (pen.) Nacho Fernández	Stadium: Vila Belmiro; Attendance: 9,278; Referee: Bruno Arleu de Araújo

10 October 31	Santos	4–1	Juventude	Santos
20:00 UTC-03:00	Lucas Barbosa (yellow card) 17'; Lucas Braga 24', 75'; Rodrigo Fernández (yellow card) 52'; Marcos Leonardo 54'; Madson 63'	Report	78' Bruno Nazário	Stadium: Vila Belmiro; Attendance: 9,171; Referee: José Mendonça da Silva Junior

17 October 32	Red Bull Bragantino	0–2	Santos	Bragança Paulista
20:00 UTC-03:00	Aderlan (yellow card) 13'; Werik Popó (yellow card) 23'; Léo Realpe (yellow card) 36'; Lucas Evangelista (red card) 90+9'	Report	(yellow card) 32' Bauermann; (yellow card) 48' Rodrigo Fernández; 51' Camacho; 69', (yellow card) 70' Ângelo; (yellow card) 74' Zanocelo	Stadium: Estádio Nabi Abi Chedid; Attendance: 6,705; Referee: Paulo César Zanovelli

22 October 33	Santos	0–1	Corinthians	Santos
19:00 UTC-03:00	Lucas Barbosa (yellow card) 50' (yellow-red card) 60'; Lucas Braga (yellow card) 80'	Report	(yellow card) 31' Fausto Vera; (yellow card) 36' (yellow-red card) 43' Yuri Alberto; (yellow card) 49' Balbuena; 89' Róger Guedes; (yellow card) 90+1' Cássio	Stadium: Vila Belmiro; Attendance: 12,872; Referee: Flávio Rodrigues de Souza

25 October 34	Flamengo	3–2	Santos	Rio de Janeiro
21:45 UTC-03:00	Pedro 45+5'; Erick Pulgar (yellow card) 70'; Marinho 78', (yellow card) 79'; Léo Pereira (yellow card) 80'; De Arrascaeta 87'	Report	(yellow card) 44' Rodrigo Fernández; 53', (yellow card) 90+8' Alex; (yellow card) 84' Madson; (yellow card) 90+3' Camacho; 90+7' Carabajal	Stadium: Maracanã; Attendance: 44,679; Referee: André Luiz de Freitas Castro

2 November 35	Atlético Goianiense	2–3	Santos	Goiânia
19:00 UTC-03:00	Churín 29', (yellow card) 60'; Luiz Fernando 39'; Baralhas (yellow card) 45+2'; Jefferson (yellow card) 73'	Report	19' Marcos Leonardo; 52' Lucas Braga; (yellow card) 62' Carlos Sánchez; 90+4' Lucas Barbosa; (yellow card) 90+5' Sandry	Stadium: Antônio Accioly; Referee: Anderson Daronco

5 November 36	Santos	1–1	Avaí	Barueri
16:30 UTC-03:00	Marcos Leonardo 5' (pen.); Rodrigo Fernández (yellow card) 49'; Luiz Felipe (yellow card) 67'; Zanocelo (yellow card) 90+4'	Report	51' (o.g.) Luiz Felipe	Stadium: Arena Barueri; Attendance: 18,686; Referee: Caio Max Augusto Vieira

10 November 37	Botafogo	3–0	Santos	Rio de Janeiro
20:00 UTC-03:00	Lucas Fernaandes 10', 53'; Gabriel Pires (yellow card) 52'; Hugo (yellow card) 68'; Tiquinho Soares 70'	Report	(yellow card) 15' Carabajal; (yellow card) 31', (red card) 90+3' Bauermann; (yellow card) 48' Rodrigo Fernández; (yellow card) 56' Camacho	Stadium: Estádio Nilton Santos; Attendance: 28,139; Referee: Bráulio da Silva Machado

13 November 38	Santos	0–2	Fortaleza	Santos
16:00 UTC-03:00	Rodrigo Fernández (yellow card) 57'	Report	(yellow card) 48' José Welison; 66' Thiago Galhardo; 80' Moisés; (yellow card) 86' Caio Alexandre	Stadium: Vila Belmiro; Attendance: 11,565; Referee: Wagner do Nascimento Magalhães

=== Copa do Brasil ===
==== First round ====
23 February Single match	Salgueiro	0–3	Santos	Salgueiro
19:00 UTC-03:00	Robinho (yellow card) 78'	Report	25', (yellow card) 61' Ângelo; (yellow card) 38' Ricardo Goulart; (yellow card) 64' Lucas Pires; 77' Zanocelo; 90+1' Rwan	Stadium: Salgueirão; Referee: Felipe Fernandes de Lima

==== Second round ====
8 March Single match	Fluminense-PI	1–1 (4–5 p)	Santos	Teresina
21:30 UTC-03:00	Mário Sérgio 42'; Thiaguinho (yellow card) 73'	Report	(yellow card) 23' (yellow-red card) 75' Camacho; (yellow card) 61' Kaiky; 82' Ricardo Goulart; (yellow card) 90+1' Zanocelo	Stadium: Lindolfinho; Referee: Diego Pombo Lopez
	Penalties
	Eduardo (penalty scored); Mazinho (penalty missed); Michel (penalty scored); Tarcísio (penalty scored); Thiaguinho (penalty scored); Ramon (penalty missed)		(penalty scored) Ricardo Goulart; (penalty scored) Zanocelo; (penalty missed) Pirani; (penalty scored) Lucas Braga; (penalty scored) Lucas Barbosa; (penalty scored) Lucas Pires

==== Third round ====
20 April First leg	Coritiba	1–0	Santos	Curitiba
19:30 UTC-03:00	Alef Manga 24', (yellow card) 71'; Henrique (yellow card) 65'; Willian Farias (yellow card) 67'; Matheus Alexandre (yellow card) 86'	Report	(yellow card) 65' Maicon; (yellow card) 71' Jhojan Julio; (yellow card) 75' Lucas Pires	Stadium: Estádio Couto Pereira; Attendance: 23,545; Referee: Bruno Arleu de Araújo

12 May Second leg	Santos	3–0 (3–1 agg.)	Coritiba	Santos
21:30 UTC-03:00	Marcos Leonardo 48', (yellow card) 90+2'; Madson 61'; Rodrigo Fernández 63', (yellow card) 81'; Lucas Pires (yellow card) 79'	Report	(yellow card) 10' Guilherme Biro; (yellow card) 26' Guillermo de los Santos; (yellow card) 54' Alex Muralha; (yellow card) 81' Régis; (yellow card) 90+2' Adrián Martínez	Stadium: Vila Belmiro; Attendance: 13,692; Referee: Sávio Pereira Sampaio

==== Round of 16 ====
22 June First leg	Corinthians	4–0	Santos	São Paulo
21:30 UTC-03:00	Mantuan 20'; Giuliano 28', 77'; Raul Gustavo 43'	Report	(red card) 62' Zanocelo; (yellow card) 77' João Paulo; (yellow card) 88' Kaiky; (yellow card) 90' Felipe Jonatan; (yellow card) 90' Ângelo	Stadium: Neo Química Arena; Attendance: 40,624; Referee: Marcelo de Lima Henrique

13 July Second leg	Santos	1–0 (1–4 agg.)	Corinthians	Santos
21:30 UTC-03:00	Marcos Leonardo 67' (pen.), (yellow card) 85'; Rodrigo Fernández (yellow card) 84'	Report	(yellow card) 26' Du Queiroz; (yellow card) 40' Bruno Melo; (yellow card) 84' Raul Gustavo	Stadium: Vila Belmiro; Attendance: 12,294; Referee: Jean Pierre Gonçalves Lima
