= Paulo Mazoti =

Brazilian footballer

Personal information
- Full name: Paulo Mazoti Azevedo
- Date of birth: 11 July 2000 (age 26)
- Place of birth: Ribeirão Pires, Brazil
- Height: 1.88 m (6 ft 2 in)
- Position: Goalkeeper

Team information
- Current team: Taubaté

Youth career
- 2011–2020: Santos

Senior career*
Years	Team	Apps	(Gls)
2021–2024	Santos	0	(0)
2024	→ São Caetano (loan)	0	(0)
2025–	Taubaté	1	(0)
- * Club domestic league appearances and goals as of 20:50, 23 March 2025 (UTC)

Paulo Mazoti Azevedo (born 11 July 2000) is a Brazilian footballer who plays as a goalkeeper for Taubaté.

== Career ==
Born in Ribeirão Pires, São Paulo, Mazoti joined Santos' youth setup in 2011, aged ten. On 17 October 2017, he signed his first professional contract with the club, until September 2020.

On 21 September 2020, after being used in the under-20 and under-23 squads during the year, Mazoti renewed his contract with Peixe until December 2021. He was promoted to the first team for the 2021 season, and further extended his link for another year on 9 August of that year, despite being a fourth-choice behind João Paulo, John and Diógenes.

On 15 September 2022, Mazoti again renewed his contract with Santos until the end of 2024. Still a fourth-choice behind João Paulo, Vladimir and Diógenes in the club's first-ever relegation, he was one of the several players deemed surplus to requirements for the 2024 campaign.

On 24 July 2024, Mazoti was loaned to São Caetano for the year's Copa Paulista. Back from loan after failing to make an appearance, he rescinded his contract on 17 October.

On 28 January 2025, Mazoti signed for Taubaté.

== Career statistics ==
As of 23 March 2025.

Club	Season	League			State League		Cup		Continental		Other		Total	
Club	Season	Division	Apps	Goals	Apps	Goals	Apps	Goals	Apps	Goals	Apps	Goals	Apps	Goals
Santos	2021	Série A	0	0	0	0	0	0	0	0	2 (Note: Appearance(s) in Copa Paulista)	0	2	0
Santos	2022	Série A	0	0	0	0	0	0	0	0	—		0	0
Santos	2023	Série A	0	0	—		0	0	0	0	—		0	0
Santos	2024	Série B	0	0	—		—		—		—		0	0
Santos	Total		0	0	0	0	0	0	0	0	2	0	2	0
São Caetano (loan)	2024	Paulista A3	—		—		—		—		0	0	0	0
Taubaté	2025	Paulista A2	—		1	0	—		—		—		1	0
Career total			0	0	1	0	0	0	0	0	2	0	3	0
