= Robson Reis =

Brazilian footballer (born 2000)

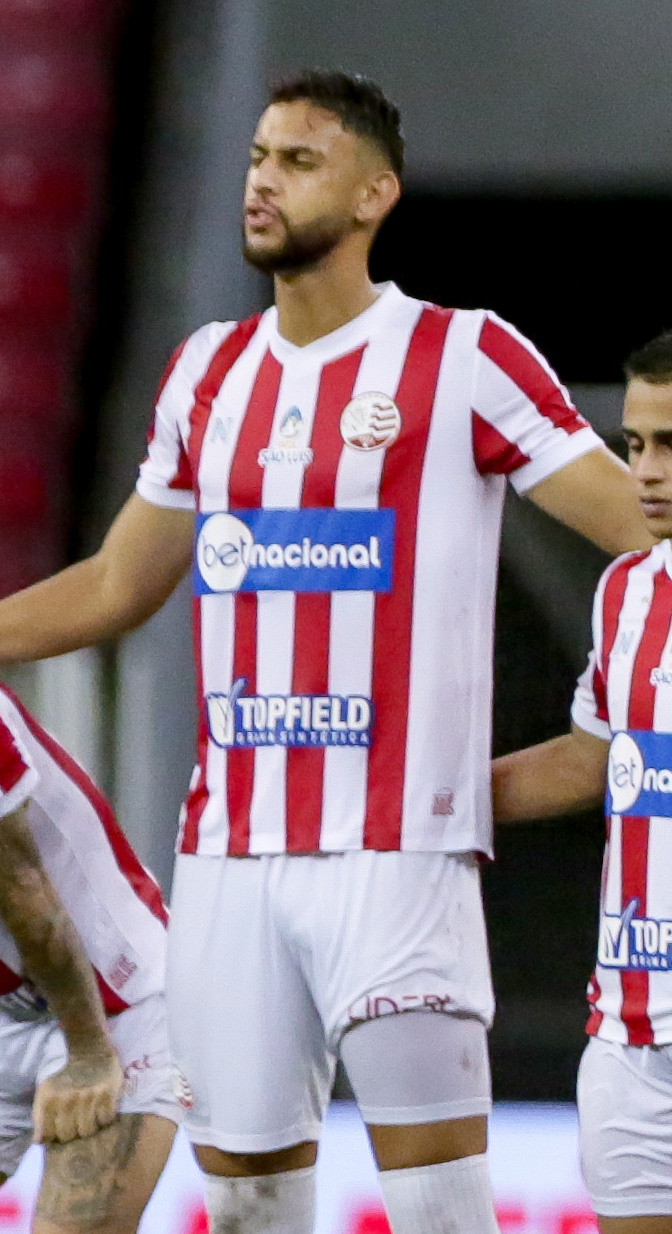
- Robson Reis in 2024

Personal information
- Full name: Robson Alves Reis
- Date of birth: 21 May 2000 (age 26)
- Place of birth: Vitória da Conquista, Brazil
- Height: 1.95 m (6 ft 5 in)
- Position: Centre-back

Team information
- Current team: Hoang Anh Gia Lai
- Number: 33

Youth career
- 2017: Osvaldo Cruz
- 2018–2021: VOCEM
- 2019–2021: → Santos (loan)

Senior career*
Years	Team	Apps	(Gls)
2021–2025	Santos	11	(0)
2022–2023	→ Boavista (loan)	6	(0)
2023–2024	→ Paços de Ferreira (loan)	0	(0)
2024	→ Náutico (loan)	6	(1)
2025	Retrô	7	(0)
2026	Anápolis	3	(0)
2026–	Hoang Anh Gia Lai	1	(0)
- * Club domestic league appearances and goals as of 6 September 2026

Robson Alves Reis (born 21 May 2000), known as Robson Reis or simply Robson, is a Brazilian professional footballer who plays as a centre-back for V.League 1 club Hoang Anh Gia Lai.

== Career ==
=== Santos ===
Born in Vitória da Conquista, Bahia, Robson represented Osvaldo Cruz and VOCEM as a youth. On 12 June 2019, he agreed to a loan move to Santos, being initially assigned to the under-20 squad.

On 1 February 2021, despite having his loan deal expired, Robson was called up to train with the main squad by manager Cuca. Seven days later, he was bought outright by Peixe and signed a permanent three-year deal.

Robson made his professional debut on 28 February 2021, coming on as a second-half substitute for fellow debutant Kaiky in a 2–2 Campeonato Paulista away draw against Santo André. He made his Série A debut on 28 August, starting in a 0–4 home loss against Flamengo.

==== Loan to Boavista ====
On 27 June 2022, Robson moved abroad for the first time in his career, after signing a one-year loan deal with Portuguese Primeira Liga side Boavista, with a buyout clause.

==== Loan to Paços de Ferreira ====
On 23 August 2023, Robson was announced at Paços de Ferreira on a one-year loan deal. On 6 January 2024, after making just one appearance in the Taça de Portugal for Paços, his loan was terminated.

==== Loan to Náutico ====
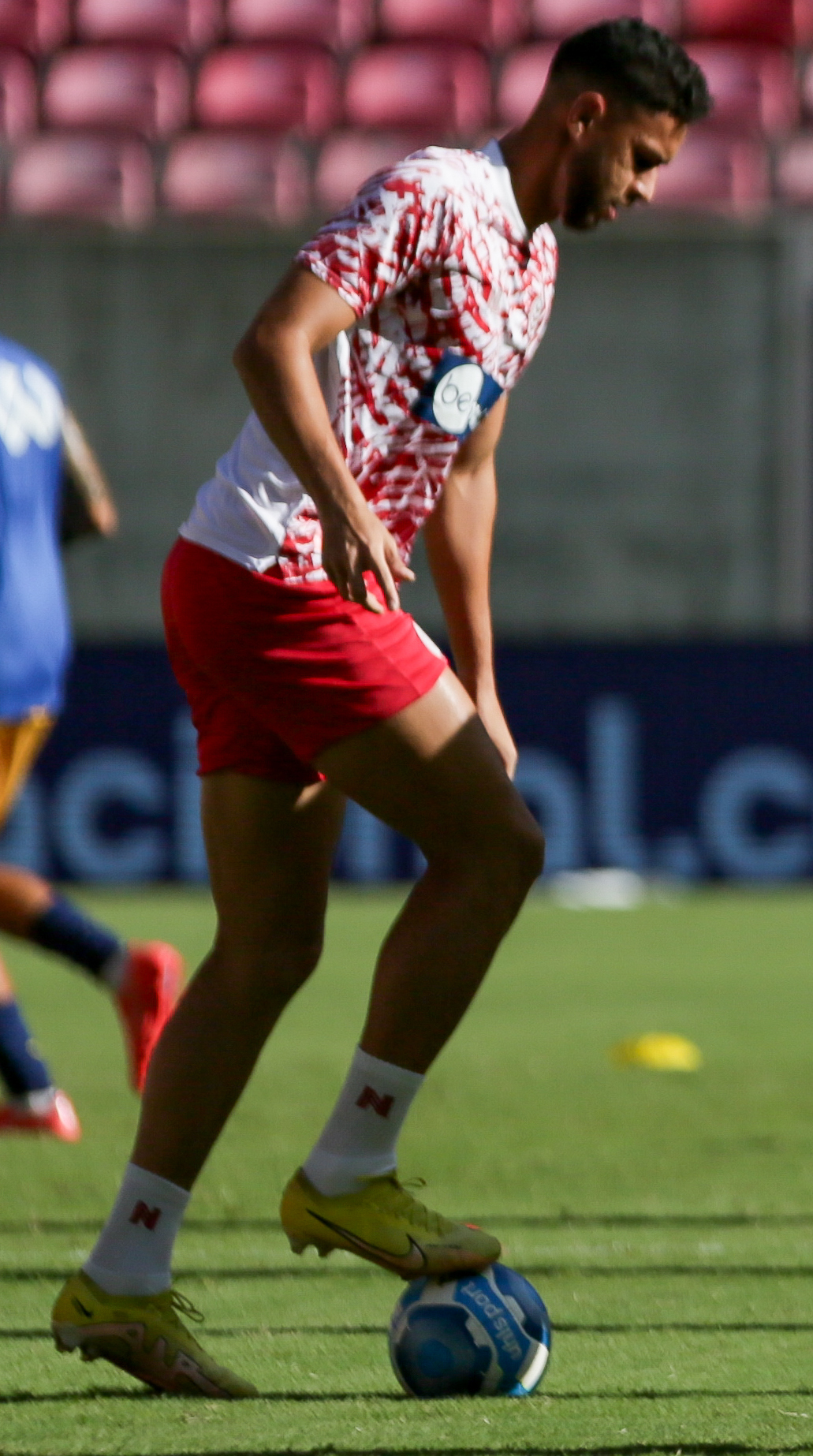
Robson warming up with Náutico in 2024

On 8 January 2024, Robson moved to Série C side Náutico on loan for the season. He scored his first professional goal sixteen days later, netting the equalizer in a 2–2 Campeonato Pernambucano away draw against Central.

In March 2024, Robson fractured his ankle in training, being sidelined for four months. Upon returning, his contract with Santos was extended for six months in January 2025, to cover his recovery period.

=== Retrô ===
On 2 March 2025, Robson signed for Retrô also in the third division after rescinding his contract with Santos.

=== Hoang Anh Gia Lai ===
In August 2026, Robson moved to Vietnam, signing for V.League 1 club Hoang Anh Gia Lai.

== Career statistics ==
As of 17 January 2026

Appearances and goals by club, season and competition
Club	Season	League			State league		Cup		Continental		Other		Total	
Club	Season	Division	Apps	Goals	Apps	Goals	Apps	Goals	Apps	Goals	Apps	Goals	Apps	Goals
Santos	2021	Série A	8	0	3	0	1	0	0	0	1 (Note: Appearance(s) in Copa Paulista)	0	13	0
Santos	2022	Série A	0	0	0	0	0	0	0	0	—		0	0
Santos	Total		8	0	3	0	1	0	0	0	1	0	13	0
Boavista (loan)	2022–23	Primeira Liga	6	0	—		1	0	—		1 (Note: Appearance(s) in Taça da Liga)	0	8	0
Paços de Ferreira (loan)	2023–24	Liga Portugal 2	0	0	—		1	0	—		0	0	1	0
Náutico (loan)	2024	Campeonato Pernambucano	—		6	1	—		—		4 (Note: Appearance(s) in Copa do Nordeste)	0	10	1
Retrô	2025	Série C	7	0	—		1	0	—		—		8	0
Anápolis	2026	Campeonato Goiano	—		3	0	—		—		—		3	0
Career total			21	0	12	1	4	0	0	0	6	0	43	1
