= Lucas Braga =

Brazilian footballer

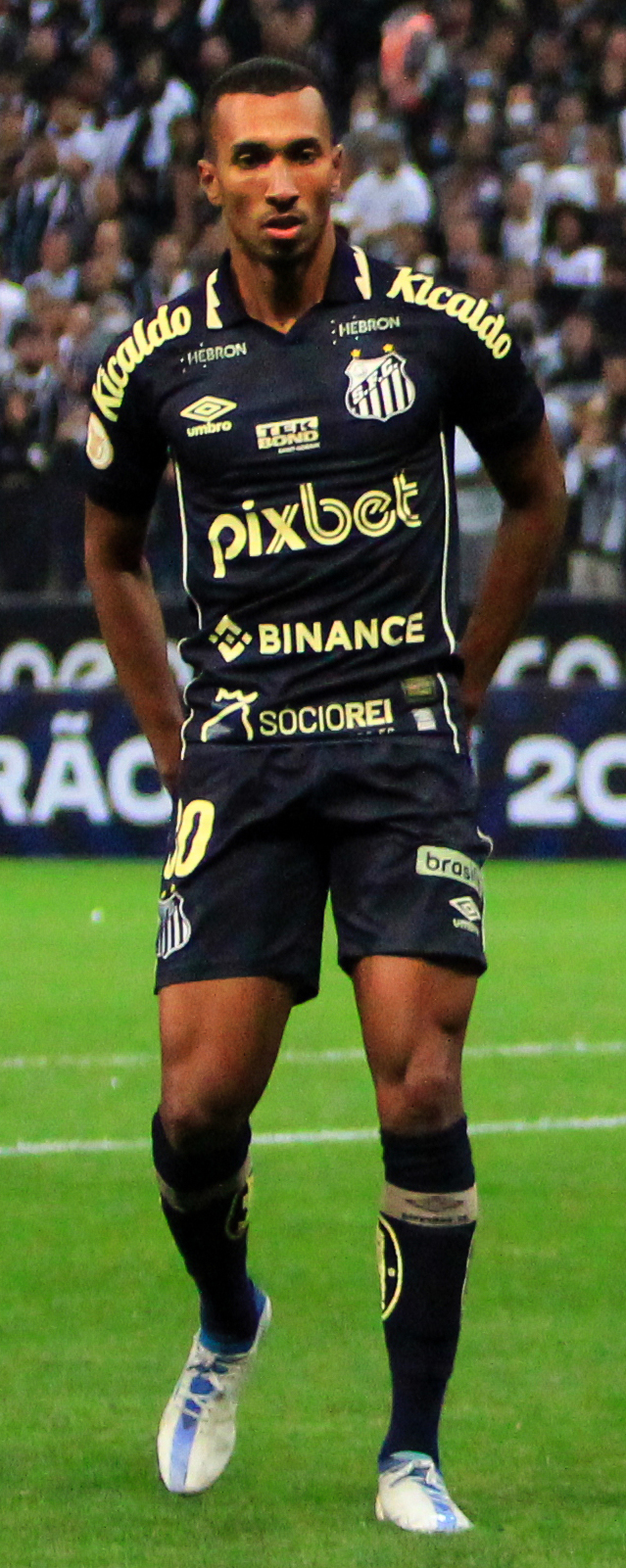
- Lucas Braga with Santos in 2022

Personal information
- Full name: Lucas Braga Ribeiro
- Date of birth: 10 November 1996 (age 29)
- Place of birth: São Paulo, Brazil
- Height: 1.84 m (6 ft 0 in)
- Position: Winger

Team information
- Current team: Vitória
- Number: 22

Youth career
- 2016: J. Malucelli

Senior career*
Years	Team	Apps	(Gls)
2017	J. Malucelli	1	(0)
2017	Batel	10	(1)
2018–2019	Luverdense	40	(4)
2018	→ Vila Nova (loan)	6	(0)
2019–2025	Santos	155	(13)
2019	→ Cuiabá (loan)	16	(0)
2020	→ Inter de Limeira (loan)	14	(1)
2024	→ Shimizu S-Pulse (loan)	35	(7)
2025–	Vitória	26	(2)
- * Club domestic league appearances and goals as of 13 December 2025

Lucas Braga Ribeiro (born 10 November 1996), known as Lucas Braga (Brazilian Portuguese: [ˈlukɐz ˈbɾaɡɐ]) or simply Braga, is a Brazilian footballer who plays for Vitória. Mainly a winger, he can also play as a wing back.

== Career ==
=== Early career ===
Born in São Paulo, Braga joined J. Malucelli's youth setup in August 2016. Promoted to the main squad for the 2017 season, he made his senior debut on 30 March of that year, coming on as a second-half substitute in a 1–0 away loss against PSTC.

After administrative problems, Braga left the club and joined Batel also in the Paraná state, to play for the club in the state's third division. He scored his first senior goal at the club, netting the opener in a 4–0 home routing of União Futebol Clube de Nova Fátima on 5 November 2017.

=== Luverdense ===
On 12 January 2018, Braga signed for Luverdense of the Série C. Regularly used by his new club, he scored his first goal for the club on 14 May, netting the last in a 4–1 home routing of Volta Redonda.

On 28 August 2018, Braga was loaned to Série B side Vila Nova on loan until the end of the season. He contributed with six appearances before returning to his parent club for the 2019 season.

=== Santos ===
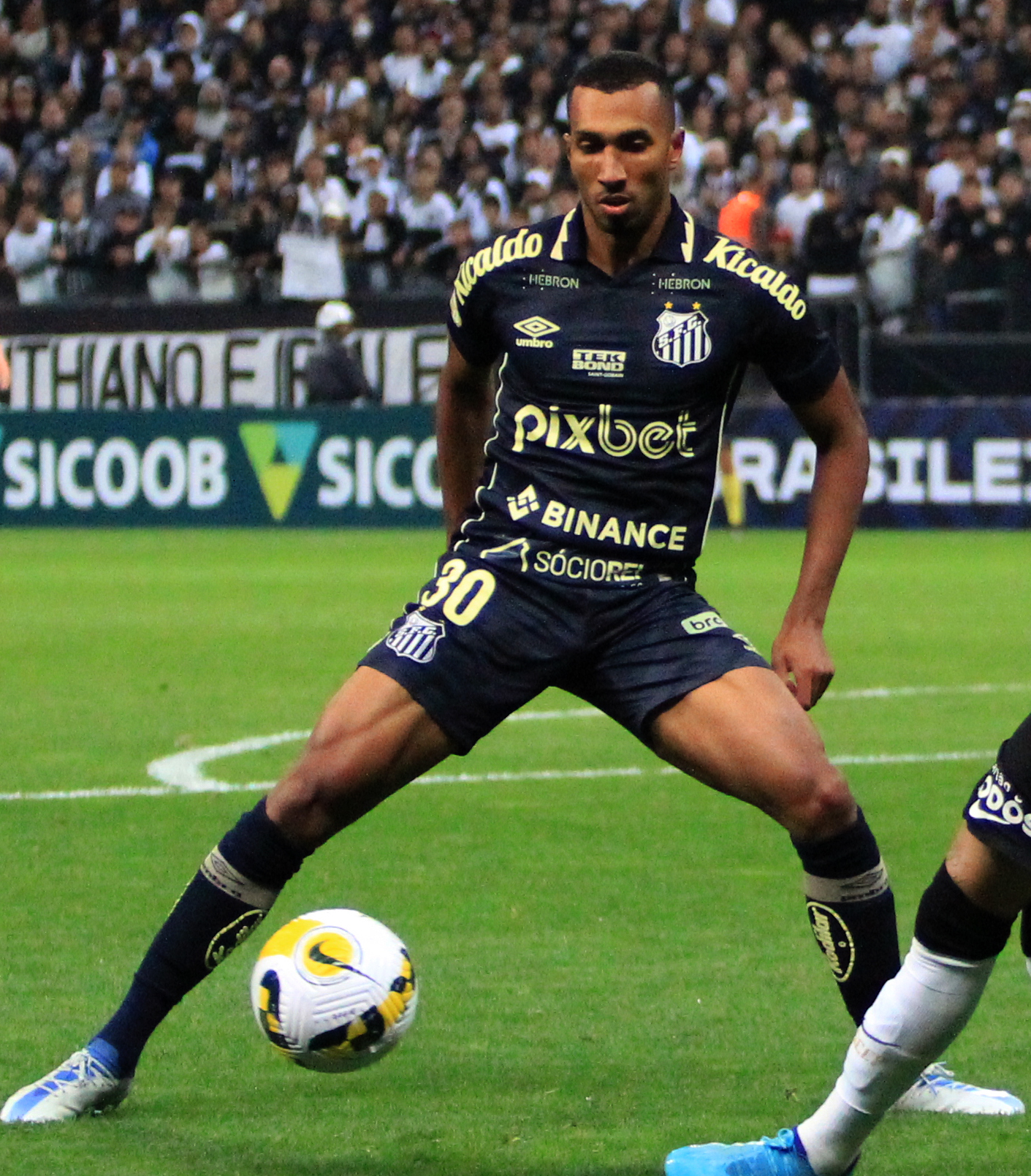
Lucas Braga with Santos in 2022

==== B-team ====
On 29 December 2018, it was announced that Braga had agreed to a pre-contract with Santos. He signed a contract until June 2022 the following 5 June, after his deal with his previous club expired, and started to appear for the under-23s.

==== Loans to Cuiabá and Inter de Limeira ====
On 9 September 2019, Braga moved to Cuiabá in the second division, on loan until the end of the campaign. On 13 December, he was announced at Inter de Limeira, also in a temporary deal. He impressed during his spell at the latter, scoring once against Oeste on 23 July.

==== Breakthrough ====
On 5 August 2020, Braga returned to Santos and was assigned to the main squad. He made his debut for the club on 20 August, coming on as a second-half substitute for Kaio Jorge in a 1–0 away win against Sport Recife for the Série A championship.

Braga made his Copa Libertadores debut on 1 October 2020, replacing Yeferson Soteldo late into a 3–2 away win against Club Olimpia. He scored his first goal for the club twenty days later, netting the equalizer in a 2–1 home win against Defensa y Justicia.

After the departure of Soteldo to Toronto FC, Braga established himself as an undisputed starter. On 20 May 2021, he signed a new five-year contract, until April 2026.

==== Loan to Shimizu S-Pulse ====
On 26 December 2023, after Santos' first-ever relegation, Braga was loaned to J2 League club Shimizu S-Pulse for one year, with a buyout clause.

=== Vitória ===
Upon returning from loan, Braga played for Santos under new head coach Pedro Caixinha, but was transferred to fellow top tier side Vitória on 6 February 2025; he signed a three-year contract with the club for a fee of R$ 5 million for 70% of his economic rights.

== Career statistics ==
As of 23 January 2025

Club	Season	League			State League		Cup		Continental		Other		Total	
Club	Season	Division	Apps	Goals	Apps	Goals	Apps	Goals	Apps	Goals	Apps	Goals	Apps	Goals
J. Malucelli	2017	Paranaense	—		1	0	—		—		—		1	0
Batel	2017	Paranaense 3ª Divisão	—		10	1	—		—		—		10	1
Luverdense	2018	Série C	18	3	10	0	2	0	—		4 (Note: Appearance(s) in Copa Verde)	0	34	3
Luverdense	2019	Série C	1	0	11	1	4	0	—		—		16	1
Luverdense	Total		19	3	21	1	6	0	—		4	0	50	4
Vila Nova (loan)	2018	Série B	6	0	—		—		—		—		6	0
Santos	2019	Série A	0	0	—		—		—		—		0	0
Santos	2020	Série A	30	2	—		2	0	9 (Note: Appearance(s) in Copa Libertadores)	2	—		41	4
Santos	2021	Série A	32	1	7	3	5	1	14 (Note: Ten appearances and two goals in Copa Libertadores, four appearances in Copa Sudamericana)	2	—		58	7
Santos	2022	Série A	33	5	12	1	5	0	8 (Note: Appearance(s) in Copa Sudamericana)	0	—		58	6
Santos	2023	Série A	27	0	11	1	3	0	1	0	—		42	1
Santos	2025	Série A	0	0	3	0	0	0	—		—		3	0
Santos	Total		122	8	33	5	15	1	32	4	—		202	18
Cuiabá (loan)	2019	Série B	16	0	—		—		—		—		16	0
Inter de Limeira (loan)	2020	Paulista	—		14	1	—		—		—		14	1
Shimizu S-Pulse (loan)	2024	J2 League	35	7	—		1	0	—		0	0	36	7
Vitória	2025	Série A	0	0	0	0	0	0	0	0	0	0	0	0
Career total			198	18	79	8	22	1	32	4	4	0	335	31
