= Lucas Barbosa (footballer, born 2001) =

Brazilian footballer (born 2001)

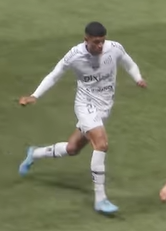
- Lucas Barbosa with Santos in 2022

Personal information
- Full name: Lucas Henrique Barbosa
- Date of birth: 22 February 2001 (age 25)
- Place of birth: Bebedouro, Brazil
- Height: 1.93 m (6 ft 4 in)
- Position: Attacking midfielder

Team information
- Current team: Red Bull Bragantino
- Number: 21

Youth career
- 2009–2015: Inter de Bebedouro
- 2015: São Paulo
- 2015: Grêmio
- 2016: Barretos
- 2017: Inter de Bebedouro
- 2018–2020: Novorizontino
- 2019: → Golden State White (loan)
- 2019–2020: → Santos (loan)
- 2020–2022: Santos

Senior career*
Years	Team	Apps	(Gls)
2021–2024	Santos	48	(5)
2023	→ Coritiba (loan)	5	(0)
2024	→ Juventude (loan)	48	(11)
2025–	Red Bull Bragantino	51	(6)
- * Club domestic league appearances and goals as of 7 April 2026

Lucas Henrique Barbosa (born 22 February 2001), known as Lucas Barbosa, is a Brazilian footballer who plays as an attacking midfielder for Red Bull Bragantino.

== Career ==
=== Early career ===
Born in Bebedouro, São Paulo, Barbosa started his career at hometown side Inter de Bebedouro at the age of eight. He subsequently represented São Paulo, Grêmio, Barretos, and returned to his first club in 2017.

Barbosa joined Novorizontino in 2018, being loaned to FC Golden State White for the 2019 Dallas Cup. On 11 September 2019, he signed for Santos' under-20 side on loan.

=== Santos ===
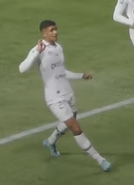
Lucas Barbosa with Santos in 2022

On 16 September 2020, Barbosa signed a permanent five-year deal with Peixe, who paid R$ 300,000 for 80% of his economic rights. He made his first team debut the following 18 April, starting in a 2–1 Campeonato Paulista home win against Inter de Limeira.

Barbosa scored his first professional goal on 27 February 2022, netting his team's second in a 2–2 home draw against former side Novorizontino. He made his Série A debut on 9 April, replacing fellow youth graduate Marcos Leonardo in a 0–0 away draw against Fluimnense.

On 11 July 2023, after being regularly used by previous head coach Odair Hellmann, Barbosa was separated from the first team squad by new head coach Paulo Turra.

==== Loan to Coritiba ====
On 28 July 2023, Barbosa joined fellow top-tier side Coritiba on loan until the end of the year. He featured rarely as the club suffered relegation.

==== Loan to Juventude ====
On 2 January 2024, Barbosa was loaned to Juventude also in the first division, until December. He became an undisputed starter for the club, also scoring regularly; he also became the club's top scorer in 15 years after reaching 13 goals in November.

=== Red Bull Bragantino ===
On 6 January 2025, Barbosa was announced at Red Bull Bragantino on a five-year deal, for a rumoured fee of R$ 16 million.

== Career statistics ==
As of 20 December 2024

Club	Season	League			State League		Cup		Continental		Other		Total	
Club	Season	Division	Apps	Goals	Apps	Goals	Apps	Goals	Apps	Goals	Apps	Goals	Apps	Goals
Santos	2021	Série A	0	0	2	0	0	0	0	0	1 (Note: Appearance(s) in Copa Paulista)	0	3	0
Santos	2022	Série A	26	2	6	1	3	0	6 (Note: Appearance(s) in Copa Sudamericana)	1	—		41	4
Santos	2023	Série A	4	0	10	2	4	1	4	0	—		22	3
Santos	Total		30	2	18	3	7	1	10	1	1	0	66	7
Coritiba (loan)	2023	Série A	5	0	—		—		—		—		5	0
Juventude (loan)	2024	Série A	33	7	15	4	8	3	—		—		56	14
Red Bull Bragantino	2025	Série A	0	0	0	0	0	0	0	0	—		0	0
Career total			68	9	33	7	15	4	10	1	1	0	127	21
