= Bruno Oliveira (footballer, born 1998) =

Brazilian footballer

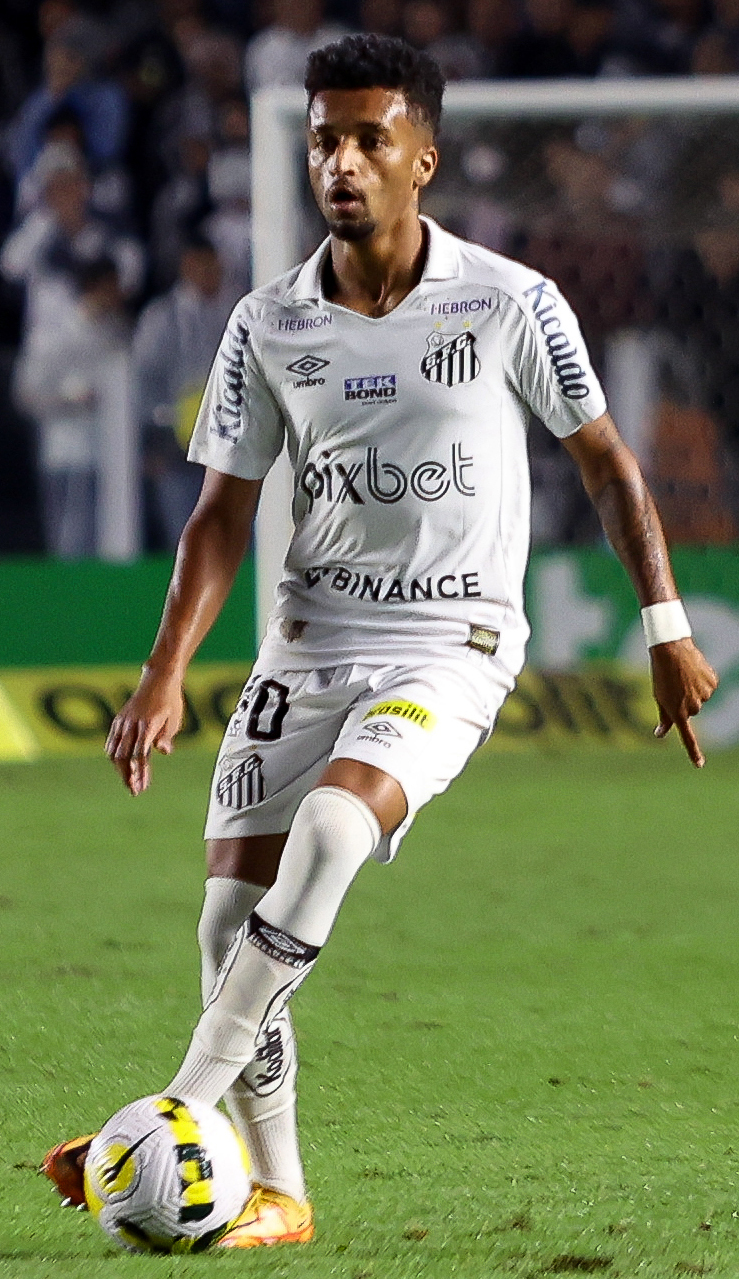

Personal information
- Full name: Bruno Felipe de Oliveira
- Date of birth: 1 February 1998 (age 28)
- Place of birth: Vinhedo, Brazil
- Height: 1.75 m (5 ft 9 in)
- Position: Attacking midfielder

Team information
- Current team: Jeonnam Dragons
- Number: 40

Youth career
- Corinthians
- 2016–2017: Bragantino
- 2017–2018: Red Bull Brasil

Senior career*
Years	Team	Apps	(Gls)
2018–2019	Red Bull Brasil	0	(0)
2018	→ XV de Piracicaba (loan)	0	(0)
2019	→ Grêmio Osasco (loan)	13	(3)
2019	→ Caldense (loan)	21	(8)
2020	Grêmio Osasco	14	(2)
2020–2022	Caldense	17	(3)
2021	→ Vitória (loan)	30	(2)
2022	→ Santos (loan)	18	(0)
2023	Seoul E-Land	30	(6)
2024	Guarani	8	(0)
2024–	Jeonnam Dragons	9	(1)
- * Club domestic league appearances and goals as of 12:34, 6 January 2024 (UTC)

Bruno Felipe de Oliveira (born 1 February 1998), known as Bruno Oliveira or Bruninho, is a Brazilian footballer who plays as an attacking midfielder for K League 2 club Jeonnam Dragons.

== Club career ==
=== Early career ===
Born in Vinhedo, São Paulo, Bruno Oliveira was released by Corinthians and subsequently represented Bragantino and Red Bull Brasil as a youth. In July 2018, he joined XV de Piracicaba for the Copa Paulista, and made his senior debut on 4 August of that year by coming on as a second-half substitute for Marcelo Fernandes in a 3–3 home draw against former side Red Bull Brasil.

For the 2019 season, Bruno Oliveira represented Grêmio Osasco and Caldense, while still owned by RB Brasil, and signed permanently with Grêmio Osasco in July 2019.

=== Caldense ===
In July 2020, Bruno Oliveira returned to Caldense on loan, but his loan spell only lasted one month as the tournaments were postponed due to the COVID-19 pandemic; in October, he signed a permanent deal with the latter club. He featured regularly in the 2021 Campeonato Mineiro, and notably scored a goal against Vasco da Gama in the 2021 Copa do Brasil.

==== Loan to Vitória ====
On 3 May 2021, Bruno Oliveira was loaned to Vitória until November. He made his club debut late in the month, playing the last 20 minutes of a 1–1 away draw against Guarani.

Bruno Oliveira subsequently became a starter, and scored his first goal for the Leão da Barra on 3 July 2021, netting the equalizer in a 1–1 home draw against Goiás. Despite scoring twice and providing three assists in 30 league appearances, he suffered team relegation.

==== Loan to Santos ====
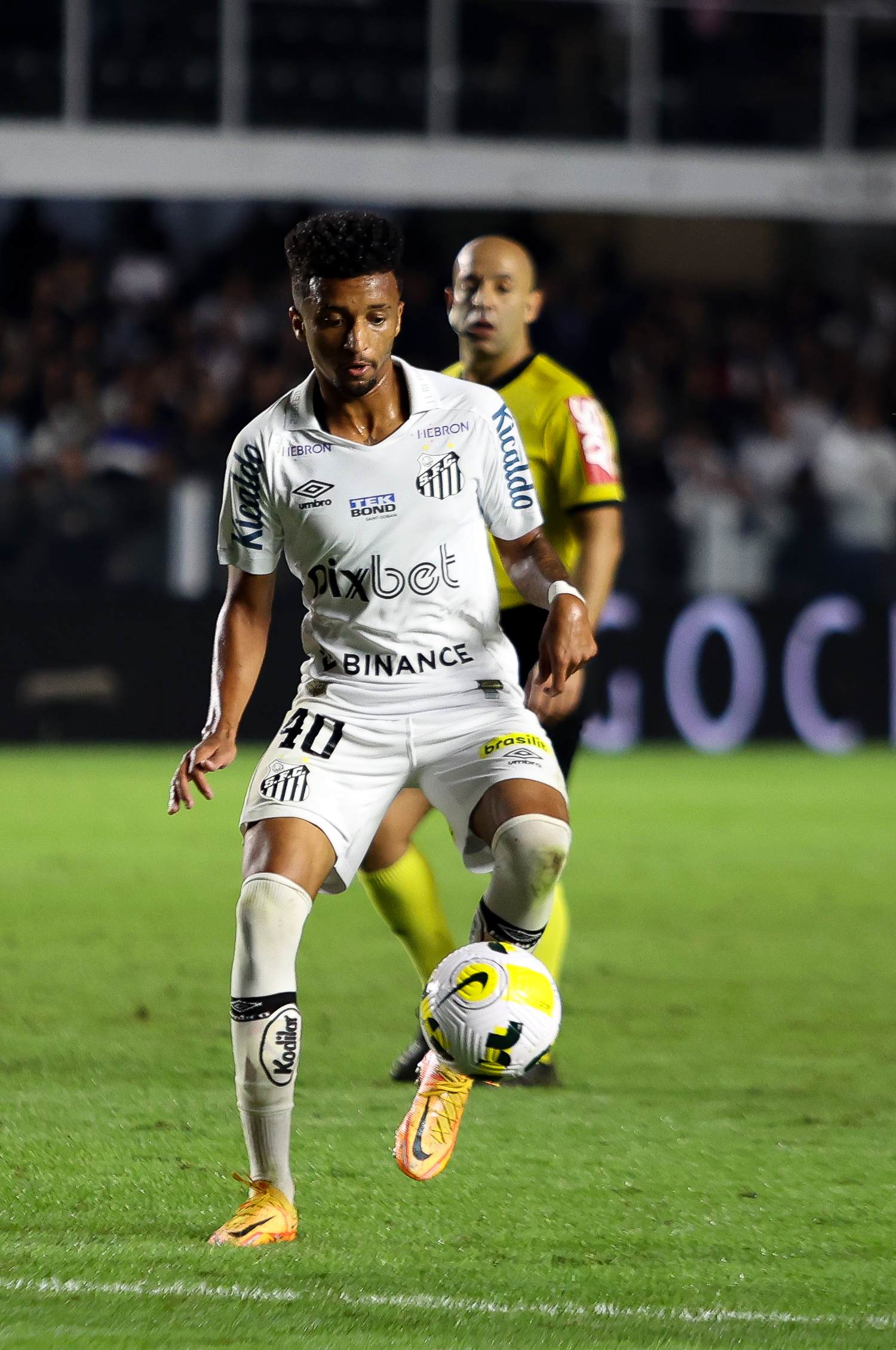
Bruno Oliveira with Santos in 2022

On 22 December 2021, Santos president Andrés Rueda confirmed the signing of Bruno Oliveira for the 2022 season. On 3 January of the following year, his one-year loan deal was confirmed by the club.

Bruno Oliveira made his debut for Peixe on 26 January 2022, replacing Camacho in a 0–0 Campeonato Paulista away draw against Inter de Limeira. On 22 November 2022, Santos announced that his buyout clause would not be exercised, and he subsequently left the club.

=== Seoul E-Land ===
On 17 February 2023, Bruno Oliveira moved abroad for the first time in his career, and joined Seoul E-Land FC of South Korean K League 2.

== Career statistics ==
As of 6 January 2024

Club	Season	League			State League		Cup		Continental		Other		Total	
Club	Season	Division	Apps	Goals	Apps	Goals	Apps	Goals	Apps	Goals	Apps	Goals	Apps	Goals
XV de Piracicaba	2018	Paulista A2	—		0	0	—		—		3 (Note: Appearance(s) in Copa Paulista)	0	3	0
Grêmio Osasco	2019	Paulista A3	—		13	3	—		—		4	0	17	3
Caldense	2019	Série D	6	1	—		—		—		—		6	1
Grêmio Osasco	2020	Paulista A3	—		14	2	—		—		—		14	2
Caldense	2020	Série D	5	1	—		—		—		—		5	1
Caldense	2021	Série D	0	0	12	2	1	1	—		—		13	3
Caldense	Total		5	1	12	2	1	1	—		—		18	4
Vitória	2021	Série B	30	2	—		—		—		2 (Note: Appearance(s) in Copa do Nordeste)	1	32	3
Santos	2022	Série A	14	0	4	0	2	0	3 (Note: Appearance(s) in Copa Sudamericana)	0	—		23	0
Seoul E-Land	2023	K League 2	30	6	—		3	3	—		—		33	9
Guarani	2024	Série B	8	0	—		—		—		—		8	0
Jeonnam Dragons	2024	K League 2	9	1	—		—		—		—		9	1
Career total			102	11	43	7	6	4	3	0	9	1	163	23
