= Vinicius Zanocelo =

Brazilian footballer

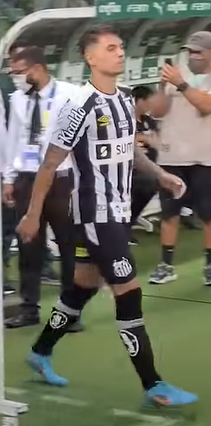
- Zanocelo with Santos in 2022

Personal information
- Full name: Vinicius Nelson de Souza Zanocelo
- Date of birth: 30 January 2001 (age 25)
- Place of birth: Santo André, Brazil
- Height: 1.85 m (6 ft 1 in)
- Position: Midfielder

Team information
- Current team: Ceará SC
- Number: 25

Youth career
- 2016: Juventus-SP
- 2016–2019: Ponte Preta

Senior career*
Years	Team	Apps	(Gls)
2019–2021	Ponte Preta	30	(1)
2021–2022	Ferroviária	12	(1)
2021–2022	→ Santos (loan)	61	(4)
2023–2025	Santos	3	(0)
2023	→ Fortaleza (loan)	6	(0)
2024–2025	→ Estoril (loan)	45	(3)
2025	→ Ceará (loan)	15	(1)
2026–	Ceará	23	(1)

International career^{‡}
2020	Brazil U20	3	(2)
- * Club domestic league appearances and goals as of 18 November 2026 ‡ National team caps and goals as of 22:47, 5 January 2021 (UTC)

Vinicius Nelson de Souza Zanocelo (born 30 January 2001), known as Vinicius Zanocelo or just Zanocelo, is a Brazilian professional footballer who plays as a midfielder for Ceará

== Club career ==
=== Ponte Preta ===
Born in Santo André, São Paulo, Zanocelo joined Ponte Preta's youth setup in July 2016, from Juventus-SP, after previously playing futsal for Corinthians, Remo and Portuguesa. On 23 February 2019, he renewed his contract until December 2021.

Zanocelo made his first team debut on 20 March 2019, coming on as a late substitute for Nathan Silva in a 0–1 Campeonato Paulista away loss against Palmeiras. He scored his first goal ten days later, netting a last-minute equalizer in a 2–2 away draw against Oeste.

Zanocelo only started to feature more regularly in the 2020 campaign, where he contributed with 15 league appearances.

=== Ferroviária ===
On 23 January 2021, Ponte Preta reached an agreement with Ferroviária for the transfer of Zanocelo, for a fee of R$ 2.3 million. He was announced at his new club on 3 February, after agreeing to a four-year contract.

Zanocelo immediately became a starter at his new club, contributing with one goal in 12 appearances in the 2021 Campeonato Paulista.

=== Santos ===
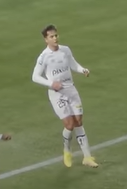
Zanocelo with Santos in 2022

On 4 June 2021, Zanocelo moved to Santos on a two-year loan deal, with a buyout clause. He made his club – and Série A – debut thirteen days later, replacing Gabriel Pirani in a 0–1 away loss against Fluminense.

Zanocelo scored his first goal for Peixe on 23 February 2022, netting his team's second in a 3–0 away win over Salgueiro, for the year's Copa do Brasil.

On 21 November 2022, Ferroviária announced the permanent transfer of Zanocelo to Santos, after the latter club activated his buyout clause. The following 8 March, after featuring rarely under head coach Odair Hellmann, he asked to leave the club.

==== Loan to Fortaleza ====
On 1 April 2023, Zanocelo was loaned to fellow top tier side Fortaleza until the end of the year, with a buyout clause. Rarely used by the club, he left when his loan expired in December after 12 matches overall.

==== Loan to Estoril ====
On 30 January 2024, following Santos' first-ever relegation to Série B, Zanocelo was loaned to Portuguese Primeira Liga club Estoril until 31 December 2024. On 6 January of the following year, his loan was extended for a further six months.

==== Loan to Ceará ====
On 8 August 2025, Ceará announced the signing of Zanocelo on loan until the end of the year.

== Career statistics ==
As of 15 December 2025.

Appearances and goals by club, season and competition
Club	Season	League			State league		Cup		Continental		Other		Total	
Club	Season	Division	Apps	Goals	Apps	Goals	Apps	Goals	Apps	Goals	Apps	Goals	Apps	Goals
Ponte Preta	2019	Série B	1	0	3	1	0	0	—		—		4	1
Ponte Preta	2020	Série B	15	0	11	0	3	0	—		—		29	0
Ponte Preta	Total		16	0	14	1	3	0	—		—		33	1
Ferroviária	2021	Série D	0	0	12	1	—		—		—		12	1
Santos	2021	Série A	23	0	—		1	0	2 (Note: Appearance(s) in Copa Sudamericana)	0	—		26	0
Santos	2022	Série A	28	3	10	1	4	1	7	0	—		49	5
Santos	2023	Série A	0	0	3	0	0	0	0	0	—		3	0
Santos	2024	Série B	0	0	0	0	—		—		—		0	0
Santos	Total		51	3	13	1	5	1	9	0	—		78	5
Fortaleza (loan)	2023	Série A	6	0	—		4	1	2	0	—		12	1
Estoril (loan)	2023–24	Primeira Liga	15	1	—		0	0	—		—		15	1
Estoril (loan)	2024–25	Primeira Liga	30	2	—		1	0	—		—		31	2
Estoril (loan)	Total		45	3	—		1	0	—		—		46	3
Ceará (loan)	2025	Série A	15	1	—		—		—		—		15	1
Career total			133	7	38	3	13	2	11	0	0	0	195	12
