= Leandro Cuca =

Brazilian footballer and manager

Personal information
- Full name: Leandro da Silva
- Date of birth: 24 August 1973 (age 53)
- Place of birth: Blumenau, Brazil
- Height: 1.85 m (6 ft 1 in)
- Position: Defensive midfielder

Youth career
- 1988–1994: Coritiba

Senior career*
Years	Team	Apps	(Gls)
1994–1997	Coritiba	27	(2)
1996	→ Londrina (loan)		
1998	Iraty		
1998	XV de Piracicaba		
1999	Criciúma	30	(0)
2000	Juventus-SP		
2001	XV de Piracicaba		
2002	União Barbarense		
2002–2003	União Madeira	2	(0)
2004–2005	Cianorte		
2005	Gama		
2005–2006	Adap Galo Maringá		
2006	Paraná		
2007	Chapecoense		
2008	Caxias		
2009	Universidade	4	(0)

Managerial career
- 2010–2011: J. Malucelli U20
- 2013: União Barbarense (assistant)
- 2013–2014: Figueirense U20
- 2015: Paraná (assistant)
- 2015: Volta Redonda (assistant)
- 2015: Volta Redonda
- 2016: Vila Nova (assistant)
- 2016: Vila Nova (interim)
- 2017–2018: Corinthians (assistant)
- 2018: Al-Wehda (assistant)
- 2019: Corinthians (assistant)
- 2020–2021: Al-Ittihad (assistant)
- 2021–2022: Santos (assistant)
- 2022: Athletico Paranaense (assistant)
- 2022–2023: V-Varen Nagasaki (assistant)
- 2024: Santos (assistant)
- * Club domestic league appearances and goals

Leandro da Silva (born 24 August 1973), known as Leandro Cuca or just Cuca, is a Brazilian football coach and former player who played as a defensive midfielder.

== Playing career ==
Born in Blumenau, Santa Catarina, Cuca began his career with Coritiba in 1994. He left the club in 1997 after a loan stint at Londrina, and subsequently represented Iraty, XV de Piracicaba (two stints), Criciúma, Juventus-SP and União Barbarense before moving abroad in 2002, with Portuguese Segunda Liga side União da Madeira.

Cuca returned to his home country in 2004 with Cianorte. He went on to play for Gama, Adap Galo Maringá, Paraná, Chapecoense, Caxias and Universidade, retiring with the latter in 2009 at the age of 36.

== Coaching career ==
After retiring, Cuca worked at J. Malucelli's youth setup before returning to União Barbarense in 2013, as an assistant coach. He was also a manager of the under-20 squad of Figueirense, and also worked as an assistant manager at Paraná and Volta Redonda before being named manager of the latter on 30 August 2015, in the place of sacked Leandro Niehues.

Cuca was himself dismissed by Voltaço on 20 November 2015, and subsequently rejoined Niehues' staff at Vila Nova in March 2016. In June, he was named interim manager after Niehues was sacked.

On 23 December 2016, Cuca was named Fábio Carille's assistant at Corinthians. He subsequently followed Carille to Al-Wehda, Al-Ittihad, Santos (two stints), Athletico Paranaense and Japanese club V-Varen Nagasaki, always as his assistant.

== Career statistics ==
Club	Season	League			State League		Cup		Continental		Other		Total	
Club	Season	Division	Apps	Goals	Apps	Goals	Apps	Goals	Apps	Goals	Apps	Goals	Apps	Goals
Coritiba	1995	Série B	0	0	19	2	—		—		—		19	2
Coritiba	1996	Série A	8	0	0	0	1	0	—		—		9	0
Coritiba	1997	Série A	0	0	0	0	1	0	—		—		1	0
Coritiba	Total		8	0	19	2	2	0	—		—		29	2
Criciúma	1999	Série B	18	0	12	0	—		—		—		30	0
União Madeira	2002–03	Segunda Liga	2	0	—		—		—		—		2	0
Universidade	2009	Gaúcho	—		4	0	—		—		—		4	0
Career total			28	0	35	2	2	0	0	0	0	0	65	2

== Managerial statistics ==
As of 30 January 2022

Managerial record by team and tenure
Team	Nat	From	To	Record								Ref
Team	Nat	From	To	G	W	D	L	GF	GA	GD	Win %	Ref
Volta Redonda	(Brazil)	30 August 2015	20 November 2015	15	10	2	3	28	12	+16	66.67	
Vila Nova (interim)	(Brazil)	5 June 2016	14 June 2016	3	2	0	1	3	1	+2	66.67	
Corinthians (interim)	(Brazil)	26 October 2019	26 October 2019	1	0	1	0	0	0	+0	0.00	
Santos (interim)	(Brazil)	26 January 2022	29 January 2022	2	0	1	1	0	1	−1	0.00	
Total				21	12	4	5	31	14	+17	57.14	—
