= Yuber Mosquera =

Colombian footballer (born 1984)

Yúber Mosquera
Personal information
- Full name: Yúber Antonio Mosquera Perea
- Date of birth: August 31, 1984 (age 42)
- Place of birth: Medellín, Colombia
- Height: 1.85 m (6 ft 1 in)
- Position: Defender

Team information
- Current team: Universidad Católica
- Number: 17

Senior career*
Years	Team	Apps	(Gls)
2006–2007	Envigado FC		
2008–2009	→ Deportivo Rionegro (loan)		
2009–2013	Deportivo Lara	140	(6)
2014–2017	Deportivo Táchira	142	(9)
2018–	Universidad Católica	80	(2)

International career
- Colombia U-20
- * Club domestic league appearances and goals as of 19:24, 18 October 2020 (UTC)

Yúber Antonio Mosquera Perea (born August 31, 1984), or simply Yúber Mosquera, is a Colombian professional footballer who plays for Universidad Católica in the Ecuadorian Serie A.
