= Lozada =

- Language: Spanish

Lozada is a Spanish surname originating in the provinces of Asturias and Castilla y Leon, as well as Cantabria.

The family branch in Spain still holds their respective aristocratic titles like count de Bague, Palancar, Viscount of Miranda and Guadalupe. The family seat is "La Plazuela de Miranda".

Notable people with the surname include:

- Agapito Lozada (1938-2011), Filipino swimmer
- Albani Lozada (born 1965), Venezuelan model
- Ana Lozada (born 1997), Mexican footballer
- Angel Lozada (born 1968), Puerto Rican novelist
- Antonio Lozada Jr., Mexican boxer
- Armando Lozada (born 1971), American rapper better known as Vico C
- Ashleyann Lozada (born 1991), Puerto Rican boxer
- Carlos Lozada (journalist) (born 1971), Peruvian-American journalist and author
- Carlos Lozada (Medal of Honor) (1946–1967), Puerto Rican member of the United States Army
- Daniel Lozada, Peruvian economist
- Elías Lozada Benavente (1896-1987), Peruvian politician
- Esteban Lozada (born 1982), Argentine rugby union player
- Evelyn Lozada (born 1975), American television personality
- Fernando Lozada (born 1989), Mexican media personality
- Gerardo Lozada, Peruvian doctor known for helping Lina Medina, the youngest confirmed mother in history, give birth to her son
- Gertrudes Lozada (born 1943), Filipino swimmer
- Ike Lozada (1943-1995), Filipino comedian, actor, and TV host
- Irma Lozada (1959-1984), American police officer
- Jacob Lozada (born 1944), Puerto rican politician
- Jay Lozada, Puerto Rican-American musician and singer
- Johnny Lozada (born 1967), Puerto Rican singer, show host and actor, member of boy band Menudo
- Jorge Lozada Stanbury (1931–2018), Peruvian politician
- Jorge Lozada Baldwin (born 1987), Peruvian footballer
- Jose Apolinario Lozada (1950-2018), Filipino diplomat and politician
- Melissa Lozada-Oliva (born 1992), American poet
- Nathan Lozada (born 1999), Australian footballer
- Quetcy Lozada (born 1970), American politician
- Rodolfo Noel Lozada, Filipino electrical engineer
