= João Paulo (footballer, born 1995) =

Brazilian footballer

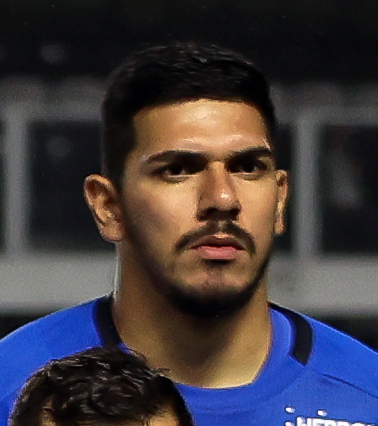
- João Paulo with Santos in 2022

Personal information
- Full name: João Paulo Silva Martins
- Date of birth: 29 June 1995 (age 31)
- Place of birth: Dourados, Brazil
- Height: 1.89 m (6 ft 2 in)
- Position: Goalkeeper

Team information
- Current team: Santos
- Number: 34

Youth career
- 2009–2010: Sete de Setembro
- 2010: São Carlos
- 2011: Itaporã
- 2011–2015: Santos

Senior career*
Years	Team	Apps	(Gls)
2015–	Santos	184	(0)
2025–2026	→ Bahia (loan)	8	(0)
- * Club domestic league appearances and goals as of 15:19, 19 May 2026 (UTC)

João Paulo Silva Martins (born 29 June 1995), known as João Paulo (Brazilian Portuguese: [ʒuˈɐ̃w ˈpawlu]), is a Brazilian footballer who plays as a goalkeeper for Santos.

== Career ==
=== Santos ===
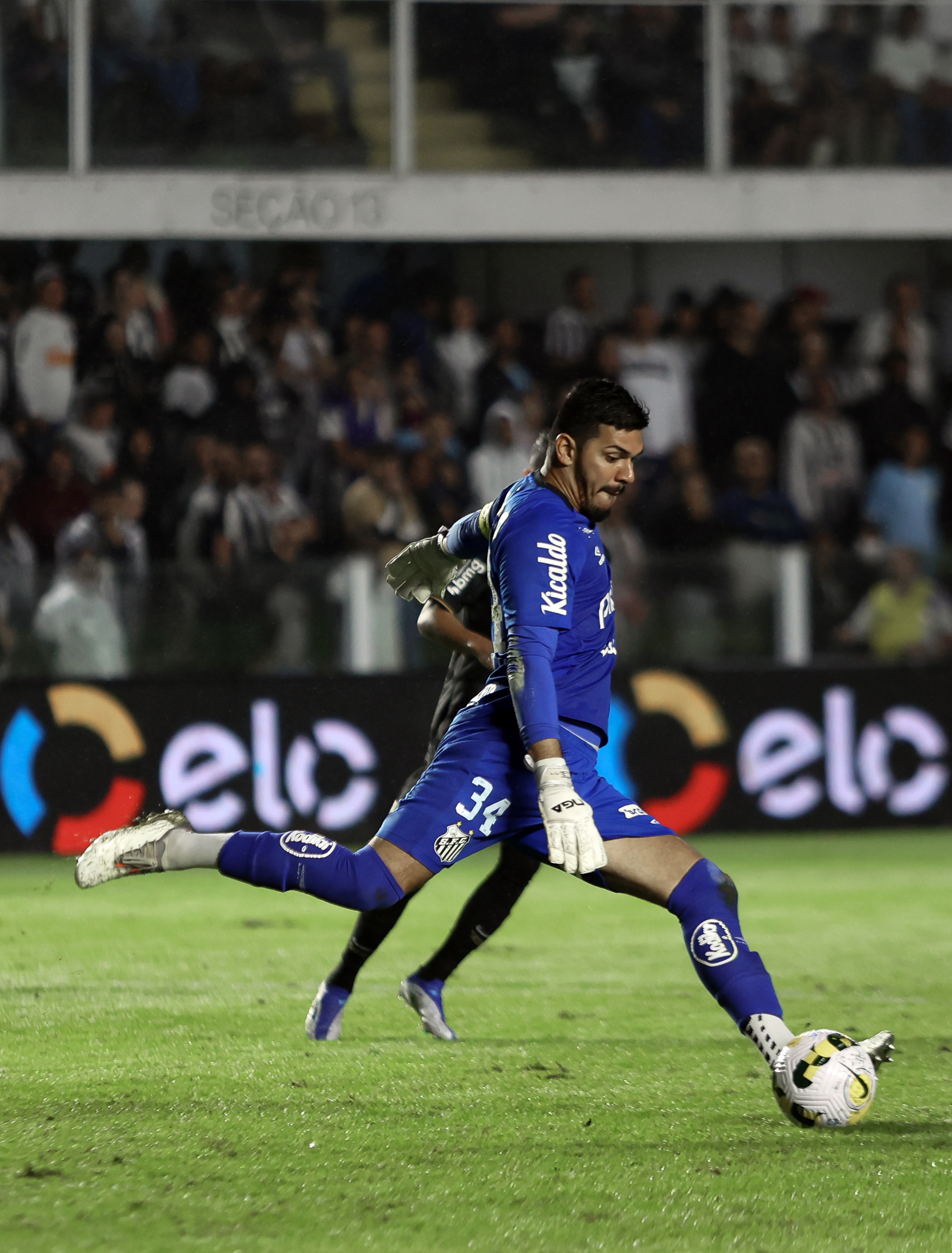
João Paulo playing for Santos in 2022

Born in Dourados, Mato Grosso do Sul, João Paulo joined Santos' youth setup in late 2011, after representing São Carlos, Itaporã (where he was a part of the first team squad at the age of just 16), Grêmio (where he spent just four months in a trial period) and Sete de Setembro. In 2014, after winning the year's Copa São Paulo de Futebol Júnior, he was promoted to the first team by manager Oswaldo de Oliveira.

In March 2015, after Vanderlei's injury, João Paulo was inscribed in the year's Campeonato Paulista as a third-choice behind Vladimir and Gabriel Gasparotto. In November of that year, he renewed his contract until 2018.

João Paulo made his unofficial first team debut on 8 October 2016, playing the last 20 minutes and saving a penalty in a 1–1 friendly draw against Benfica. On 16 July of the following year, after both Vanderlei and Vladimir were injured, he made his professional – and Série A – debut by starting in a 0–0 away draw against Vasco da Gama.

On 10 October 2017, João Paulo renewed his contract until 2021. He started to appear more regularly during the 2020 season, as Vanderlei left, Vladimir was injured and Everson took a legal action against the club, and renewed his contract until 2025 on 8 September 2020.

João Paulo made his Copa Libertadores debut on 15 September 2020, starting in a 0–0 home draw against Club Olimpia. On 9 November, he and two other teammates tested positive for COVID-19.

On 14 December 2021, João Paulo renewed his contract with Santos until November 2026. The following 28 February, he played his 100th match for the club, a 2–2 home draw against Novorizontino.

On 9 January 2023, João Paulo further extended his contract with Santos until the end of 2027. He played his 200th match for the club on 8 October, a 2–1 away win over Palmeiras, and was an undisputed starter in the club's first-ever relegation from the top tier.

On 24 May 2024, during a Série B match against América Mineiro, João Paulo suffered an Achilles tendon injury and was sidelined for the remainder of the year; in the play, which resulted in Renato Marques' opening goal for América, several players and media complained about the lack of fair play from the goalscorer. Upon returning, he became a backup option to Gabriel Brazão, and returned to action on 23 February 2025, as Brazão was out with an injury.

==== Loan to Bahia ====
On 25 August 2025, Bahia announced the signing of João Paulo on loan until June 2026, with a buyout clause. After suffering an injury before debuting, he only managed to feature for the side in the 2026 season, but was still a backup option before head coach Rogério Ceni confirmed his departure on 30 May of that year.

== Career statistics ==
As of 6 July 2026

Club	Season	League			State League		Cup		Continental		Other		Total	
Club	Season	Division	Apps	Goals	Apps	Goals	Apps	Goals	Apps	Goals	Apps	Goals	Apps	Goals
Santos	2015	Série A	0	0	—		0	0	—		—		0	0
Santos	2016	Série A	0	0	—		0	0	—		—		0	0
Santos	2017	Série A	1	0	0	0	0	0	0	0	—		1	0
Santos	2018	Série A	0	0	0	0	0	0	0	0	—		0	0
Santos	2019	Série A	0	0	0	0	0	0	0	0	—		0	0
Santos	2020	Série A	26	0	0	0	2	0	5 (Note: Appearance(s) in Copa Libertadores)	0	—		33	0
Santos	2021	Série A	33	0	3	0	4	0	14 (Note: Ten appearances in Copa Libertadores, four appearances in Copa Sudamericana)	0	—		54	0
Santos	2022	Série A	37	0	12	0	8	0	7 (Note: Appearance(s) in Copa Sudamericana)	0	—		64	0
Santos	2023	Série A	36	0	12	0	6	0	5	0	—		59	0
Santos	2024	Série B	7	0	16	0	—		—		—		23	0
Santos	2025	Série A	0	0	1	0	0	0	—		—		1	0
Santos	2026	Série A	0	0	—		0	0	—		—		0	0
Santos	Total		140	0	44	0	20	0	31	0	—		235	0
Bahia (loan)	2025	Série A	0	0	—		0	0	—		—		0	0
Bahia (loan)	2026	Série A	2	0	6	0	0	0	0	0	—		8	0
Bahia (loan)	Total		2	0	6	0	0	0	0	0	—		8	0
Career total			142	0	50	0	20	0	31	0	0	0	243	0

== Honours ==
Santos

- Campeonato Brasileiro Série B: 2024

Bahia

- Campeonato Baiano: 2026

Individual

- Campeonato Paulista Team of the Year: 2024
