= Kaiky =

Brazilian footballer

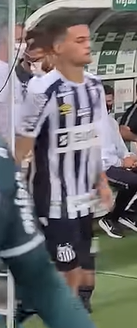
- Kaiky with Santos in 2022

Personal information
- Full name: Kaiky Fernandes Melo
- Date of birth: 12 January 2004 (age 22)
- Place of birth: Santos, Brazil
- Height: 1.87 m (6 ft 2 in)
- Position: Centre back

Team information
- Current team: Shabab Al Ahli
- Number: 15

Youth career
- Portuários
- 2013–2021: Santos

Senior career*
Years	Team	Apps	(Gls)
2021–2022	Santos	33	(1)
2022–2025	Almería	44	(1)
2024	→ Albacete (loan)	12	(0)
2025–	Shabab Al Ahli	0	(0)

International career^{‡}
2019	Brazil U15	7	(0)
2022–	Brazil U20	3	(1)
- * Club domestic league appearances and goals as of 2 June 2025 ‡ National team caps and goals as of 18:44, 14 June 2022 (UTC)

Kaiky Fernandes Melo (born 12 January 2004), simply known as Kaiky, is a Brazilian professional footballer who plays as a centre-back for UAE Pro League club Shabab Al Ahli.

== Club career ==
=== Santos ===
Born in Santos, São Paulo, Kaiky joined Santos' youth setup from local side Portuários. Initially playing futsal, he started to appear in the club's football categories at the age of nine.

On 21 December 2020, Kaiky signed his first professional contract with Peixe, agreeing to a three-year deal. He made his professional debut the following 28 February, starting in a 2–2 Campeonato Paulista away draw against Santo André.

On his Copa Libertadores debut on 9 March 2021, Kaiky started and scored his first professional goal, netting the winner in a 2–1 home success over Deportivo Lara; aged 17 years, one month and 25 days, he became the youngest Brazilian to score in the competition and second overall, only behind Juan Carlos Cárdenas; his record was broken in the following month by teammate Ângelo.

Kaiky made his Série A debut on 29 May 2021, starting in a 0–3 away loss against Bahia. On 27 April 2022, after establishing himself in the first team squad, he renewed his contract until December 2026.

=== Almería ===
On 11 July 2022, Santos agreed to transfer Kaiky to Spanish La Liga side UD Almería for a rumoured fee of €7 million. The move was officially announced eight days later, with the player signing a six-year deal.

Kaiky made his debut abroad on 14 August 2022, starting in a 2–1 home loss to Real Madrid. He scored his first professional goal on 26 August 2023, netting a last-minute equalizer in a 1–1 away draw against Cádiz.

On 1 February 2024, Kaiky was loaned to Segunda División side Albacete for the remainder of the season.

=== Shabab Al Ahli ===
On 26 July 2025, Kaiky was transferred to UAE Pro League side Shabab Al Ahli.

== International career ==
Kaiky was called up to the under-15 team in 2019, and featured in the 2019 South American U-15 Championship for the side as captain. He featured in six matches during the tournament as his side lifted the trophy.

In 2020, Kaiky was called multiple times to the under-17s, in a training period ahead of the 2021 South American U-17 Championship.

== Career statistics ==
As of match played 26 September 2023

Club	Season	League			State league (Note: Includes Campeonato Paulista)		National cup (Note: Includes Copa do Brasil, Copa del Rey)		Continental		Total	
Club	Season	Division	Apps	Goals	Apps	Goals	Apps	Goals	Apps	Goals	Apps	Goals
Santos	2021	Série A	15	0	7	0	2	0	13 (Note: Ten appearances and one goal in Copa Libertadores, three appearances in Copa Sudamericana)	1	37	1
Santos	2022	Série A	1	0	10	1	3	0	3 (Note: Appearances in Copa Sudamericana)	0	17	1
Santos	Total		16	0	17	1	5	0	16	1	54	2
Almería	2022–23	La Liga	13	0	—		1	0	—		14	0
Almería	2023–24	La Liga	3	1	—		0	0	—		3	1
Almería	Total		16	1	—		1	0	—		17	1
Career total			32	1	17	1	6	0	16	1	71	3

== Honours ==
=== International ===
Brazil U15

- South American U-15 Championship: 2019
