= Lucas Ochandorena =

Argentine footballer and coach

Personal information
- Full name: Lucas Gabriel Ochandorena
- Date of birth: 3 April 1985 (age 41)
- Place of birth: La Plata, Argentina
- Height: 1.81 m (5 ft 11 in)
- Position: Defender

Team information
- Current team: Villa San Carlos (manager)

Youth career
- Villa San Carlos

Senior career*
Years	Team	Apps	(Gls)
2006–2012	Villa San Carlos	146	(1)
2007–2008	→ La Plata FC (loan)	28	(0)
2012–2013	Ferrocarril Midland	27	(0)
Total		199	(1)

Managerial career
- 2014–2015: Villa San Carlos (assistant)
- 2016–2017: Villa San Carlos (assistant)
- 2017: Estudiantes de La Plata (assistant)
- 2017: Quilmes (assistant)
- 2018–2019: Los Andes (assistant)
- 2019: Colón (assistant)
- 2020–2021: Deportivo Cuenca (assistant)
- 2022: Barcelona SC (assistant)
- 2022: Santos (assistant)
- 2024: Atlanta (assistant)
- 2024–: Villa San Carlos
- * Club domestic league appearances and goals

Lucas Gabriel Ochandorena (born 4 March 1985) is an Argentine football coach and former player who played as a defender. He is the current manager of Villa San Carlos.

== Playing career ==
Born in La Plata, Ochandorena made his senior debut with Villa San Carlos in 2006. He also played for La Plata FC during the 2007–08, before returning to Villa San Carlos and becoming a regular starter.

In 2012, Ochandorena moved to Ferrocarril Midland. He featured regularly before suffering an anterior cruciate ligament injury in May 2013; he subsequently never played professional football again.

== Coaching career ==
After retiring, Ochandorena joined the staff of his former club Villa San Carlos in 2014, as an assistant. He then moved to Banfield in 2016 as an analyst of the youth sides, before returning to Villa San Carlos in October of that year.

In July 2017, Ochandorena became Lucas Nardi's assistant at Estudiantes de La Plata and Quilmes. He was also under the same role at Los Andes and Colón before moving to Ecuador in October 2020, as the assistant of Guillermo Duró at Deportivo Cuenca.

On 21 December 2021, Ochandorena joined Fabián Bustos' staff at Barcelona SC as his assistant, and also followed Bustos to Santos under the same role the following March. On 12 May, he was in charge of the latter club in a 3–0 Copa do Brasil home win over Coritiba, as Bustos was suspended.

On 1 May 2024, after a brief spell as Mario Sciacqua's assistant at Atlanta, Ochandorena was appointed manager of Villa San Carlos.

== Managerial statistics ==
As of 4 July 2022

Managerial record by team and tenure
Team	Nat.	From	To	Record								Ref
Team	Nat.	From	To	G	W	D	L	GF	GA	GD	Win %	Ref
Santos (interim)	(Brazil)	12 May 2022	12 May 2022	1	1	0	0	3	0	+3	100.00	
Santos (interim)	(Brazil)	26 June 2022	26 June 2022	1	0	1	0	0	0	+0	0.00	
Career totals				2	1	1	0	3	0	+3	50.00	—
