= Jhony Douglas =

Brazilian footballer

Personal information
- Full name: Jhony Douglas Santiago
- Date of birth: 19 February 1997 (age 29)
- Place of birth: Arapongas, Brazil
- Height: 1.80 m (5 ft 11 in)
- Position: Defensive midfielder

Team information
- Current team: Floresta
- Number: 5

Youth career
- 2013: Arapongas
- 2014–2017: Paraná

Senior career*
Years	Team	Apps	(Gls)
2016–2020	Paraná	74	(3)
2019	→ Paysandu (loan)	10	(0)
2021–2022	Coritiba	14	(0)
2022	→ Inter de Limeira (loan)	12	(0)
2022	→ Novorizontino (loan)	29	(3)
2023	São Bernardo FC	12	(0)
2023	Sampaio Corrêa	15	(0)
2024	Inter de Limeira	2	(0)
2024–2025	Figueirense	35	(2)
2025	Botafogo-SP	4	(0)
2025–2026	Joinville	6	(0)
2026–	Floresta	19	(1)
- * Club domestic league appearances and goals as of 9 November 2026

Jhony Douglas Santiago (born 19 February 1997), known as Jhony Douglas is a Brazilian footballer who plays as a defensive midfielder for Floresta.

== Career statistics ==
As of 9 August 2021

Club	Season	League			State League		Cup		Continental		Other		Total	
Club	Season	Division	Apps	Goals	Apps	Goals	Apps	Goals	Apps	Goals	Apps	Goals	Apps	Goals
Paraná	2016	Série B	3	0	—		—		—		—		3	0
Paraná	2017	Série B	17	0	8	0	5	0	—		1 (Note: Appearance(s) in Primeira Liga)	0	31	0
Paraná	2018	Série A	8	0	0	0	—		—		—		8	0
Paraná	2019	Série B	8	0	—		—		—		—		8	0
Paraná	2020	Série B	26	3	4	0	1	0	—		—		31	3
Paraná	Total		62	3	12	0	6	0	—		1	0	81	3
Paysandu (loan)	2019	Série C	6	0	4	0	1	0	—		—		11	0
Coritiba	2021	Série B	9	0	5	0	0	0	—		—		14	0
Inter de Limeira (loan)	2022	Série D	0	0	3	0	—		—		—		3	0
Career total			77	3	24	0	7	0	0	0	1	0	109	3
