= 2026 Santos FC season =

Santos
2026 season
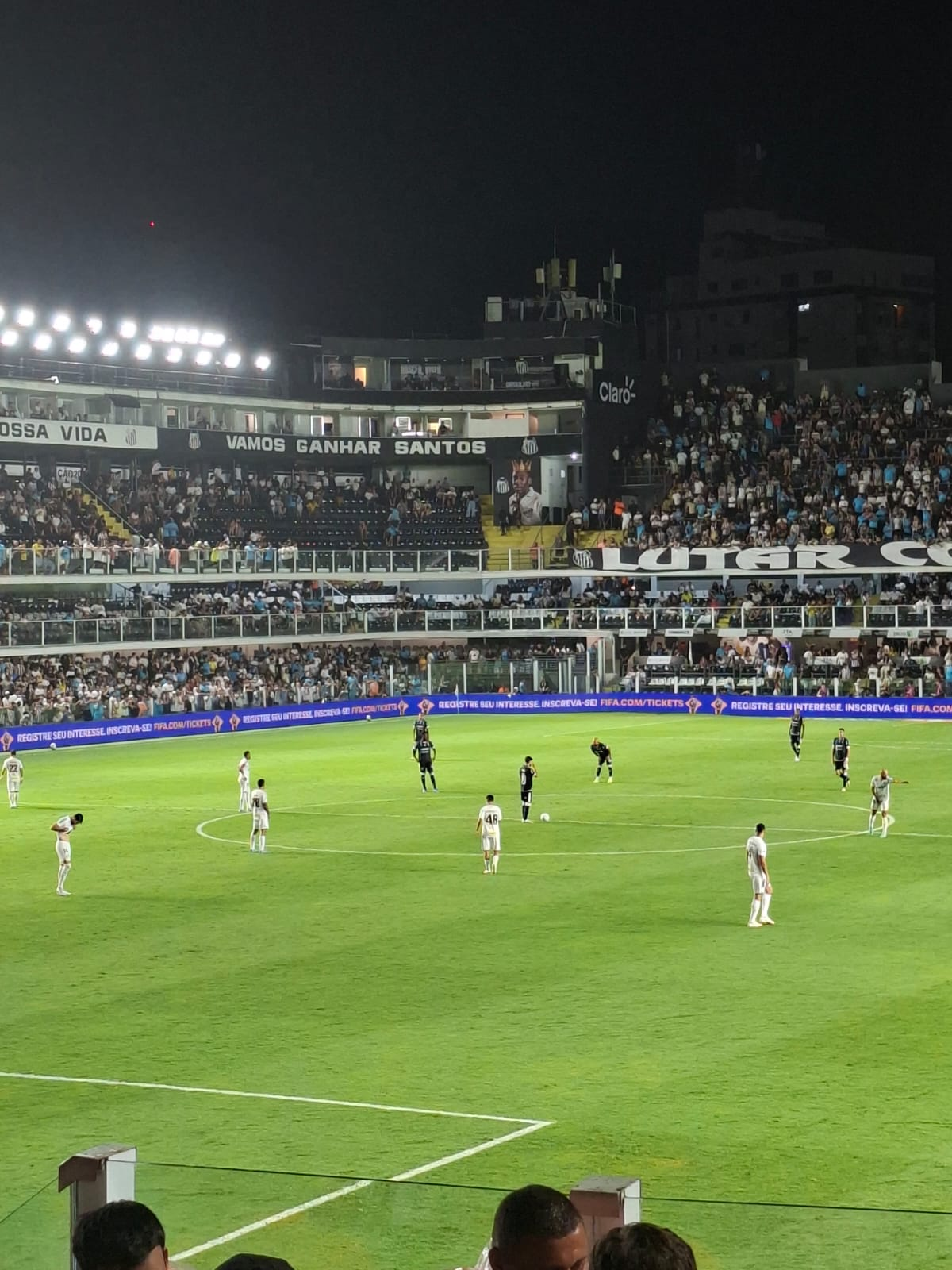
- Santos vs Remo at the Vila Belmiro on 2 April
- President: Marcelo Teixeira
- Head coach: Juan Pablo Vojvoda (until 19 March); Cuca (from 19 March)
- Stadium: Vila Belmiro
- Série A: 9th
- Campeonato Paulista: Quarter-final
- Copa do Brasil: Quarter-finals
- Copa Sudamericana: Quarter-finals
- Top goalscorer: League: Gabriel (13); All: Gabriel (23)
Home colours	Away colours	Third colours

The 2026 season is the Santos FC's 114th season in existence, and the second consecutive in the top flight of Brazilian football. The club will also compete in the state league, Campeonato Paulista, in the Copa do Brasil and in the Copa Sudamericana.

== Players ==
=== Squad information ===
As of 2 November 2026

N	Name	Pos.	Nat.	Place of Birth	Date of Birth (Age)	Caps	Goals	Signed from	Date signed	Fee	Contract End
Goalkeepers
1	Diógenes	GK	(Brazil)	Itapecerica da Serra (São Paulo (state))	6 January 2001 (age 25)	15	0	Youth system	9 July 2021	Free	31 December 2028
34	João Paulo	GK	(Brazil)	Dourados (Mato Grosso do Sul)	29 June 1995 (age 31)	236	0	Youth system	26 February 2014	Free	31 December 2027
67	Rodrigo Falcão	GK	(Brazil)	Santos (São Paulo (state))	25 March 2005 (age 21)	0	0	Youth system	8 January 2024	Free	31 January 2029
77	Gabriel Brazão	GK	(Brazil)	Uberlândia (Minas Gerais)	5 October 2000 (age 26)	134	0	Inter Milan (Italy)	21 February 2024	Free	31 December 2028
79	João Pedro	GK	(Brazil)	Santos (São Paulo (state))	18 March 2008 (age 18)	0	0	Youth system	11 May 2024	Free	30 April 2031
Defenders
3	Vinicius Lira	LB	(Brazil)	São Paulo (São Paulo (state))	12 October 2007 (age 19)	14	0	Youth system	28 January 2025	Free	31 August 2028
4	Lucas Veríssimo	CB	(Brazil)	Jundiaí (São Paulo (state))	10 May 1999 (age 27)	219	7	Al-Duhail (Qatar)	3 March 2026	US$ 4M	31 December 2028
14	Luan Peres	CB/LB	(Brazil)	São Paulo (São Paulo (state))	19 July 1994 (age 32)	176	2	Fenerbahçe (Turkey)	2 September 2024	Free	31 December 2027
18	Igor Vinícius	RB	(Brazil)	Sinop (Mato Grosso)	1 April 1997 (age 29)	62	0	São Paulo	1 July 2025	Free	30 June 2028
23	Rodinei	RB	(Brazil)	Tatuí (São Paulo (state))	29 January 1992 (age 34)	11	0	Olympiacos (Greece)	2 September 2026	Free	31 December 2027
25	Gabriel Menino	RB/DM	(Brazil)	Morungaba (São Paulo (state))	29 September 2000 (age 26)	25	4	Atlético Mineiro	14 January 2026	Loan	31 December 2026
26	João Ananias	CB	(Brazil)	São Paulo (São Paulo (state))	12 February 2007 (age 19)	13	0	Youth system	9 August 2025	Free	30 June 2030
27	Davizinho	RB/RW	(Brazil)	Rio de Janeiro (Rio de Janeiro (state))	27 July 2008 (age 18)	8	0	Youth system	22 May 2026	Free	31 July 2031
31	Gonzalo Escobar	LB	(Argentina)	Alejandro Korn	16 March 1997 (age 29)	120	2	Fortaleza	19 April 2024	Swap	31 December 2027
38	Rafael Gonzaga	LB	(Brazil)	São Sebastião (São Paulo (state))	7 February 2008 (age 18)	8	0	Youth system	21 March 2026	Free	31 December 2030
42	João Alencar	CB	(Brazil)	Belo Horizonte (Minas Gerais)	25 June 2007 (age 19)	4	0	Youth system	24 September 2025	Free	31 July 2031
Midfielders
5	João Schmidt	DM/CM	(Brazil)	São Paulo (São Paulo (state))	19 May 1993 (age 33)	128	4	Kawasaki Frontale (Japan)	30 December 2023	Free	31 December 2027
6	Arthur	CM/DM	(Brazil)	Goiânia (Goiás)	12 August 1996 (age 30)	7	0	Juventus (Italy)	31 August 2026	Free	31 December 2026
8	Gabriel Bontempo	AM/RW	(Brazil)	Uberaba (Minas Gerais)	16 January 2005 (age 21)	87	8	Youth system	21 January 2025	Free	31 December 2030
10	Neymar	AM/LW	(Brazil)	Mogi das Cruzes (São Paulo (state))	5 February 1992 (age 34)	285	159	Al-Hilal (Saudi Arabia)	31 January 2025	Free	31 December 2026
11	Philippe Coutinho	AM	(Brazil)	Rio de Janeiro (Rio de Janeiro (state))	12 June 1992 (age 34)	7	2	Free agent	14 September 2026	Free	31 December 2026
15	Willian Arão	DM/CB	(Brazil)	São Paulo (São Paulo (state))	12 March 1992 (age 34)	59	3	Panathinaikos (Greece)	1 July 2025	Free	31 December 2026
20	Pepê Fermino	AM/CM	(Brazil)	Balneário Camboriú (Santa Catarina (state))	12 February 2007 (age 19)	0	0	Youth system	10 January 2026	Free	30 June 2030
28	Christian Oliva	DM	(Uruguay)	Ciudad del Plata	1 June 1996 (age 30)	41	3	Nacional (Uruguay)	28 February 2026	US$ 1.5M	31 December 2028
30	Miguel Terceros	AM/RW	(Bolivia)	Santa Cruz de la Sierra	25 April 2004 (age 22)	44	2	Youth system	20 July 2022	Free	31 May 2029
32	Benjamín Rollheiser	AM/RW	(Argentina)	Coronel Suárez	24 March 2000 (age 26)	92	8	Benfica (Portugal)	12 February 2025	€ 11M	31 December 2028
45	Lima	AM/CM	(Brazil)	Araçatuba (São Paulo (state))	11 June 1996 (age 30)	6	0	Fluminense	4 September 2026	Loan	31 December 2026
48	Gustavo Henrique	DM/RB	(Brazil)	Limeira (São Paulo (state))	7 April 2005 (age 21)	33	0	Youth system	24 January 2025	Free	31 December 2030
81	Samuel Pierri	DM	(Brazil)	São Bento do Sapucaí (São Paulo (state))	30 January 2008 (age 18)	7	0	Youth system	23 April 2026	Free	31 July 2031
Forwards
7	Everton Cebolinha	LW	(Brazil)	Maracanaú (Ceará)	22 March 1996 (age 30)	7	0	Flamengo	9 September 2026	Free	31 December 2026
9	Gabriel	ST	(Brazil)	São Bernardo (São Paulo (state))	30 August 1996 (age 30)	258	106	Cruzeiro	3 January 2026	Loan	31 December 2026
16	Thaciano	ST/AM	(Brazil)	Campina Grande (Paraíba)	12 May 1995 (age 31)	68	10	Bahia	13 January 2025	€ 4.5M	31 December 2028
17	Gustavo Caballero	RW/LW	(Paraguay)	San Lorenzo	21 September 2001 (age 25)	27	1	Nacional (Paraguay)	24 July 2025	€ 1.3M	31 December 2028
21	Moisés	LW/RW	(Brazil)	Morro da Fumaça (Santa Catarina (state))	2 September 1996 (age 30)	21	3	Fortaleza	11 February 2026	€ 2M	31 December 2028
22	Álvaro Barreal	LW/LM	(Argentina)	Buenos Aires	17 August 2000 (age 26)	86	15	FC Cincinnati (United States)	6 February 2025	US$ 4M	31 December 2029
33	Rony	ST/LW	(Brazil)	Magalhães Barata (Pará)	11 May 1995 (age 31)	47	5	Atlético Mineiro	30 January 2026	€ 3M	31 December 2029
39	Pedro Assis	ST	(Brazil)	Lauro de Freitas (Bahia)	19 February 2007 (age 19)	1	0	Youth system	17 January 2026	Free	31 January 2028
47	Mateus Xavier	LW/RW	(Brazil)	Ibicaraí (Bahia)	29 June 2007 (age 19)	10	0	Youth system	30 June 2024	Free	31 July 2028
55	Fernando Pradella	ST	(Brazil)	Osasco (São Paulo (state))	3 July 2008 (age 18)	1	0	Youth system	26 January 2026	Free	30 August 2027
57	Nadson	RW/LW	(Brazil)	Luís Edu. Magalhães (Bahia)	24 January 2009 (age 17)	2	0	Youth system	7 February 2026	Free	23 January 2028

Source: SantosFC.com.br (for appearances and goals) and FPF (for contracts). Players in italic are not registered for the Campeonato Brasileiro Série A.

Campeonato Paulista squad
- Teams are able to register up to 35 players in the A List, while an unlimited number of players above the age of 16 and born until 2005, with at least six months in the club, can be registered in the B List.
- Players in ~~strike~~ were replaced, players in italic left the club.
- **A List**
- Note: Flags indicate national team as defined under FIFA eligibility rules; some limited exceptions apply. Players may hold more than one non-FIFA nationality.
  No.	Pos.	Nation	Player
  —	GK	BRA	Diógenes
  —	GK	BRA	Gabriel Brazão
  —	DF	ARG	Adonis Frías
  —	DF	PAR	Alexis Duarte
  —	DF	BRA	João Basso
  —	DF	BRA	Luan Peres
  —	DF	BRA	Zé Ivaldo
  —	DF	ARG	Gonzalo Escobar
  —	DF	BRA	Igor Vinícius
  —	DF	BRA	JP Chermont
  —	DF	BRA	Mayke
  —	DF	BRA	Vinicius Lira
  —	MF	BRA	Gabriel Menino
  —	MF	BRA	Gustavo Henrique
  —	MF	BRA	João Schmidt
  —	MF	VEN	Tomás Rincón
  No.	Pos.	Nation	Player
  —	MF	BRA	Willian Arão
  —	MF	BRA	Zé Rafael
  —	MF	ARG	Álvaro Barreal
  —	MF	ARG	Benjamín Rollheiser
  —	MF	BRA	Gabriel Bontempo
  —	MF	BOL	Miguel Terceros
  —	MF	BRA	Neymar
  —	MF	BRA	Thaciano
  —	FW	ALG	Billal Brahimi
  —	FW	BRA	Gabriel
  —	FW	PAR	Gustavo Caballero
  —	FW	ARG	Lautaro Díaz
  —	FW	BRA	Robinho Júnior
  —	FW	BRA	Rony
  —	FW	BRA	Tiquinho Soares
- **B List**
- Note: Flags indicate national team as defined under FIFA eligibility rules; some limited exceptions apply. Players may hold more than one non-FIFA nationality.
  No.	Pos.	Nation	Player
  —	GK	BRA	Arthur do Vale
  —	GK	BRA	João Pedro
  —	GK	BRA	Rodrigo Falcão
  —	DF	BRA	João Alencar
  —	DF	BRA	João Ananias
  —	DF	BOL	Marcelo Torrez
  —	DF	BRA	Rafael Gonzaga
  —	DF	BRA	Souza
  —	MF	BRA	Gabriel Paes
  —	MF	BRA	Kenay
  No.	Pos.	Nation	Player
  —	MF	VEN	Nicola Profeta
  —	MF	BRA	Bernardo
  —	MF	BRA	Lucas Yan
  —	MF	BRA	Pepê Fermino
  —	FW	BRA	David Nogueira
  —	FW	BRA	Fernando Pradella
  —	FW	BRA	Mateus Xavier
  —	FW	BRA	Nadson
  —	FW	BRA	Pedro Assis
  —	FW	BRA	Rafael Freitas
Copa Sudamericana squad
- Players in ~~strike~~ left the club and were unregistered, players in italic left the club but are still registered in the squad, players in **bold** were added later on.
- Note: Flags indicate national team as defined under FIFA eligibility rules; some limited exceptions apply. Players may hold more than one non-FIFA nationality.
  No.	Pos.	Nation	Player
  1	GK	BRA	Diógenes
  2	DF	BRA	~~Zé Ivaldo~~
  3	DF	BRA	Vinicius Lira
  4	DF	BRA	Lucas Veríssimo
  5	MF	BRA	João Schmidt
  6	MF	BRA	**Arthur** (Note: Replaced Zé Rafael)
  7	FW	BRA	~~Robinho Júnior~~
  8	MF	BRA	Gabriel Bontempo (Note: Changed number from 49 to 8; replaced Tomás Rincón)
  9	FW	BRA	Gabriel Barbosa
  10	MF	BRA	Neymar
  11	FW	BRA	Rony
  12	DF	BRA	~~Mayke~~
  14	DF	BRA	Luan Peres
  15	MF	BRA	Willian Arão
  16	MF	BRA	Thaciano
  17	FW	PAR	**Gustavo Caballero**
  18	DF	BRA	Igor Vinícius
  19	FW	ARG	Lautaro Díaz
  20	MF	BRA	Pepê Fermino
  21	FW	BRA	Moisés
  22	FW	ARG	Álvaro Barreal
  23	DF	BRA	**Rodinei**
  25	DF	BRA	Gabriel Menino
  26	DF	BRA	João Ananias
  27	DF	BRA	**Davizinho**
  28	MF	URU	Christian Oliva
  29	FW	BRA	Kaio Ganga
  No.	Pos.	Nation	Player
  30	MF	BOL	Miguel Terceros
  31	DF	ARG	Gonzalo Escobar
  32	MF	ARG	Benjamín Rollheiser
  34	GK	BRA	**João Paulo**
  37	MF	BRA	Kenay
  38	DF	BRA	Rafael Gonzaga
  39	FW	BRA	Pedro Assis
  41	FW	BRA	João Victor Alves (Note: Changed number from 27 to 41)
  42	DF	BRA	João Alencar
  45	MF	BRA	**Lima**
  47	FW	BRA	Mateus Xavier
  48	MF	BRA	Gustavo Henrique
  55	FW	BRA	Fernando Pradella
  57	FW	BRA	Nadson
  58	MF	BRA	Vinicius Rocha
  59	FW	BRA	David Nogueira
  66	DF	BRA	Gabriel Follmer
  67	GK	BRA	Rodrigo Falcão
  72	MF	VEN	Nicola Profeta (Note: Changed number from 17 to 72)
  76	FW	BRA	Vinicius Fabri
  77	GK	BRA	Gabriel Brazão
  79	GK	BRA	João Pedro
  80	MF	BRA	Kauan Pierry
  81	MF	BRA	Samuel Pierri
  88	GK	BRA	Arthur do Vale
  98	DF	ARG	~~Adonis Frías~~
  99	DF	BOL	Marcelo Torrez
- Source: CONMEBOL
- Notes

=== Appearances and goals ===
No.	Pos.	Nat	Name	Campeonato Brasileiro		Campeonato Paulista		Copa do Brasil		Copa Sudamericana		Total	
No.	Pos.	Nat	Name	Apps	Goals	Apps	Goals	Apps	Goals	Apps	Goals	Apps	Goals
1	GK	(Brazil)	Diógenes	9	0	0	0	1	0	0	0	10	0
34	GK	(Brazil)	João Paulo	0	0	0	0	0	0	0	0	0	0
77	GK	(Brazil)	Gabriel Brazão	24	0	9	0	5	0	12	0	50	0
79	GK	(Brazil)	João Pedro	0	0	0	0	0	0	0	0	0	0
2	DF	(Brazil)	Zé Ivaldo	4+1	0	7	0	0	0	0	0	12	0
3	DF	(Brazil)	Vinicius Lira	4+1	0	4+3	0	0	0	0	0	12	0
4	DF	(Paraguay)	Alexis Duarte	1	0	0	0	0	0	0	0	1	0
4	DF	(Brazil)	Lucas Veríssimo	19	0	0	0	5	0	5+2	0	31	0
12	DF	(Brazil)	Mayke	3	0	3+1	0	0	0	1	0	8	0
13	DF	(Brazil)	João Basso	0+2	0	0	0	0	0	0	0	2	0
14	DF	(Brazil)	Luan Peres	23+3	2	4+1	0	3	0	8+1	0	43	2
18	DF	(Brazil)	Igor Vinícius	20+1	0	6	0	5	0	4+4	0	40	0
23	DF	(Brazil)	Rodinei	8	0	0	0	0	0	2	0	10	0
26	DF	(Brazil)	João Ananias	3+3	0	0	0	2	0	4+1	0	13	0
25	DF	(Brazil)	Gabriel Menino	5+8	1	4+2	1	1+2	0	3	2	25	4
27	DF	(Brazil)	Davizinho	0+4	0	0	0	0+2	0	1+1	0	8	0
31	DF	(Argentina)	Gonzalo Escobar	23	0	5+2	1	6	0	9	0	46	1
38	DF	(Brazil)	Rafael Gonzaga	0+4	0	0	0	0	0	1+3	0	8	0
42	DF	(Brazil)	João Alencar	2+1	0	0	0	0	0	0	0	3	0
98	DF	(Argentina)	Adonis Frías	9	1	7	0	2+1	1	4+1	0	24	1
5	MF	(Brazil)	João Schmidt	11+7	0	5+2	0	3	0	4+2	0	34	0
6	MF	(Brazil)	Arthur	2+3	0	0	0	0	0	0+2	0	7	0
6	MF	(Brazil)	Zé Rafael	2+3	1	2+3	0	0+1	0	0+1	0	12	1
8	MF	(Venezuela)	Tomás Rincón	0+2	0	0+1	0	0	0	0	0	3	0
8	MF	(Brazil)	Gabriel Bontempo	24+5	0	2+1	1	5+1	1	10+1	3	49	5
10	MF	(Brazil)	Neymar	14+1	8	1+1	0	4+1	0	4+1	2	27	10
11	MF	(Brazil)	Philippe Coutinho	4+2	2	0	0	0	0	0	0	6	2
15	MF	(Brazil)	Willian Arão	18+6	1	7	0	3+2	0	10	2	46	3
20	MF	(Brazil)	Pepê Fermino	0	0	0	0	0	0	0	0	0	0
28	MF	(Uruguay)	Christian Oliva	17+8	2	0	0	4+2	0	9+1	1	41	3
30	MF	(Bolivia)	Miguel Terceros	6+5	1	3+5	0	0+1	0	4+2	1	26	2
32	MF	(Argentina)	Benjamín Rollheiser	9+19	4	5+3	1	4+1	0	7+4	0	52	5
45	MF	(Brazil)	Lima	1+4	0	0	0	0	0	0+1	0	6	0
48	MF	(Brazil)	Gustavo Henrique	19+2	0	0+1	0	2+1	0	6+1	0	32	0
81	MF	(Brazil)	Samuel Pierri	0+2	0	0	0	0+1	0	0+4	0	7	0
7	FW	(Brazil)	Everton	6	0	0	0	0	0	0	0	6	0
7	FW	(Brazil)	Robinho Júnior	0+4	0	0+5	0	0	0	0+3	0	12	0
9	FW	(Brazil)	Gabriel	22+3	15	7+1	4	4+2	0	9	6	48	25
16	FW	(Brazil)	Thaciano	7+13	2	4+3	2	0+3	0	3+4	1	37	5
17	FW	(Paraguay)	Gustavo Caballero	4+5	0	1	0	2+1	0	1+1	0	15	0
19	FW	(Argentina)	Lautaro Díaz	2+6	1	3+4	0	0	0	1+3	0	19	1
21	FW	(Brazil)	Moisés	4+9	2	1+1	1	0+2	0	2+2	0	21	3
21	FW	(Algeria)	Billal Brahimi	0	0	0	0	0	0	0	0	0	0
22	FW	(Argentina)	Álvaro Barreal	21+6	5	7	1	6	0	5+3	1	48	7
33	FW	(Brazil)	Rony	13+16	1	2+2	1	0+5	1	3+6	2	47	5
39	FW	(Brazil)	Pedro Assis	0	0	0	0	0	0	0+1	0	1	0
45	FW	(Brazil)	Rafael Freitas	0	0	0	0	0	0	0	0	0	0
47	FW	(Brazil)	Mateus Xavier	0+1	0	0+2	0	0	0	0+2	0	5	0
55	FW	(Brazil)	Fernando Pradella	0+1	0	0	0	0	0	0	0	1	0
57	FW	(Brazil)	Nadson	0+1	0	0+1	0	0	0	0	0	2	0

Source: Match reports in Competitive matches, Soccerway. Players in italic have departed the club before the end of the season.

=== Goalscorers ===
Ran	No.	Pos	Nat	Name	Série A	Paulista	Copa do Brasil	Sudamericana	Total
1	9	FW	(Brazil)	Gabriel	15	4	0	6	25
2	10	MF	(Brazil)	Neymar	8	0	0	2	10
3	22	MF	(Argentina)	Álvaro Barreal	5	1	0	0	6
4	8	MF	(Brazil)	Gabriel Bontempo	0	1	1	3	5
4	16	MF	(Brazil)	Thaciano	2	2	0	1	5
4	32	MF	(Argentina)	Benjamín Rollheiser	4	1	0	0	5
4	33	FW	(Brazil)	Rony	1	1	1	2	5
8	25	MF	(Brazil)	Gabriel Menino	1	1	0	2	4
9	15	MF	(Brazil)	Willian Arão	1	0	0	2	3
9	21	FW	(Brazil)	Moisés	2	1	0	0	3
9	28	MF	(Uruguay)	Christian Oliva	2	0	0	1	3
12	14	DF	(Brazil)	Luan Peres	2	0	0	0	2
12	30	MF	(Bolivia)	Miguel Terceros	1	0	0	1	2
12	11	MF	(Brazil)	Philippe Coutinho	2	0	0	0	2
12	98	DF	(Argentina)	Adonis Frías	1	0	1	0	2
16	6	MF	(Brazil)	Zé Rafael	1	0	0	0	1
16	19	FW	(Argentina)	Lautaro Díaz	1	0	0	0	1
16	31	DF	(Argentina)	Gonzalo Escobar	0	1	0	0	1
Own goals					1	0	0	2	3
Total					50	13	3	22	88

Source: Match reports in Competitive matches. Players in italic have departed the club before the end of the season.

=== Disciplinary record ===
N	Nat	Pos	Name	Brasileirão			Paulista			Copa do Brasil			Copa Sudamericana			Total		
N	Nat	Pos	Name	Yellow card	(yellow card) (yellow-red card)	Red card	Yellow card	(yellow card) (yellow-red card)	Red card	Yellow card	(yellow card) (yellow-red card)	Red card	Yellow card	(yellow card) (yellow-red card)	Red card	Yellow card	(yellow card) (yellow-red card)	Red card
31	(Argentina)	DF	Gonzalo Escobar	8	0	0	2	0	0	3	0	0	3	0	0	16	0	0
9	(Brazil)	FW	Gabriel	8	0	1	1	0	0	3	0	0	1	0	0	13	0	1
14	(Brazil)	DF	Luan Peres	6	1	0	1	0	0	1	0	0	3	0	0	11	1	0
22	(Argentina)	FW	Álvaro Barreal	9	0	1	1	0	0	1	0	0	1	0	0	12	0	1
10	(Brazil)	MF	Neymar	9	0	1	0	0	0	2	0	0	1	0	0	12	0	1
48	(Brazil)	MF	Gustavo Henrique	6	1	0	1	0	0	0	0	0	2	0	0	9	1	0
33	(Brazil)	FW	Rony	4	0	0	1	0	0	1	0	0	3	0	0	9	0	0
25	(Brazil)	DF	Gabriel Menino	2	0	0	2	1	0	2	0	0	1	0	0	7	1	0
18	(Brazil)	DF	Igor Vinícius	4	0	0	3	0	0	0	0	0	1	0	0	8	0	0
98	(Argentina)	DF	Adonis Frías	2	0	0	2	0	0	1	0	0	1	0	0	6	0	0
4	(Brazil)	DF	Lucas Veríssimo	5	0	0	0	0	0	0	0	0	3	0	0	8	0	0
8	(Brazil)	MF	Gabriel Bontempo	4	0	0	0	0	0	1	0	0	1	0	0	6	0	0
15	(Brazil)	MF	Willian Arão	3	0	0	2	0	0	0	0	0	1	0	0	6	0	0
77	(Brazil)	GK	Gabriel Brazão	5	0	0	0	0	0	0	0	0	0	0	0	5	0	0
5	(Brazil)	MF	João Schmidt	6	0	0	0	0	0	1	0	0	0	0	0	7	0	0
32	(Argentina)	MF	Benjamín Rollheiser	2	0	0	1	0	0	1	0	0	0	0	0	4	0	0
2	(Brazil)	DF	Zé Ivaldo	1	0	0	2	0	0	0	0	0	0	0	0	3	0	0
16	(Brazil)	FW	Thaciano	2	0	0	1	0	0	0	0	0	0	0	0	3	0	0
30	(Bolivia)	MF	Miguel Terceros	1	0	0	2	0	0	0	0	0	0	0	0	3	0	0
28	(Uruguay)	MF	Christian Oliva	2	0	0	0	0	0	2	0	0	0	0	0	4	0	0
1	(Brazil)	GK	Diógenes	1	0	0	0	0	0	0	0	0	0	0	0	1	0	0
3	(Brazil)	DF	Vinicius Lira	1	0	0	0	0	0	0	0	0	0	0	0	1	0	0
4	(Paraguay)	DF	Alexis Duarte	1	0	0	0	0	0	0	0	0	0	0	0	1	0	0
6	(Brazil)	MF	Zé Rafael	1	0	0	0	0	0	0	0	0	0	0	0	1	0	0
7	(Brazil)	FW	Everton	2	0	0	0	0	0	0	0	0	0	0	0	2	0	0
7	(Brazil)	FW	Robinho Júnior	0	0	0	1	0	0	0	0	0	0	0	0	1	0	0
8	(Venezuela)	MF	Tomás Rincón	1	0	0	0	0	0	0	0	0	0	0	0	1	0	0
12	(Brazil)	DF	Mayke	1	0	0	1	0	0	0	0	0	0	0	0	2	0	0
17	(Paraguay)	FW	Gustavo Caballero	0	0	0	0	0	0	1	0	0	0	0	0	1	0	0
23	(Brazil)	DF	Rodinei	1	0	0	0	0	0	0	0	0	1	0	0	2	0	0
26	(Brazil)	DF	João Ananias	1	0	0	0	0	0	0	0	0	0	0	0	1	0	0
34	(Brazil)	GK	João Paulo	1	0	0	0	0	0	0	0	0	0	0	0	1	0	0
38	(Brazil)	DF	Rafael Gonzaga	0	0	0	0	0	0	1	0	0	0	0	0	1	0	0
11	(Brazil)	MF	Philippe Coutinho	1	0	0	0	0	0	0	0	0	0	0	0	1	0	0
42	(Brazil)	DF	João Alencar	1	0	0	0	0	0	0	0	0	0	0	0	1	0	0
TOTALS				102	2	3	24	1	0	21	0	0	23	0	0	170	3	3

Source: Match reports in Competitive matches, Soccerway (yellow card) = Number of bookings; (yellow card) (yellow-red card) = Number of sending offs after a second yellow card; (red card) = Number of sending offs by a direct red card. Players in italic have departed the club before the end of the season.

=== Suspensions served ===
Date	Matches Missed	Player	Reason	Opponents Missed	Competition
31 January	1	Gabriel Menino	(red card) vs São Paulo	Noroeste (A)	Campeonato Paulista
8 February	1	Igor Vinícius	3x (yellow card)	Velo Clube (H)	Campeonato Paulista
15 March	1	Luan Peres	(red card) vs Corinthians	Internacional (H)	Série A
2 April	1	Neymar	3x (yellow card)	Flamengo (A)	Série A
2 April	1	Rony	3x (yellow card)	Flamengo (A)	Série A
5 April	1	Álvaro Barreal	3x (yellow card)	Atlético Mineiro (H)	Série A
11 April	1	Gonzalo Escobar	3x (yellow card)	Fluminense (H)	Série A
19 April	1	Gabriel Barbosa	3x (yellow card)	Bahia (A)	Série A
19 April	1	Igor Vinícius	3x (yellow card)	Bahia (A)	Série A
19 April	1	Gustavo Henrique	3x (yellow card)	Bahia (A)	Série A
2 May	1	Gabriel Brazão	3x (yellow card)	Red Bull Bragantino (H)	Série A
17 May	1	Álvaro Barreal	(red card) vs Coritiba	Grêmio (A)	Série A
20 May	1	Lucas Veríssimo	3x (yellow card)	Deportivo Cuenca (H)	Copa Sudamericana
23 May	1	Gustavo Henrique	(red card) vs Grêmio	Vitória (H)	Série A
30 May	1	Gabriel Barbosa	(red card) vs Vitória	Botafogo (A)	Série A
25 July	1	Neymar	3x (yellow card)	Athletico Paranaense (H)	Série A
13 August	1	Gonzalo Escobar	3x (yellow card)	Macará (A)	Copa Sudamericana
20 August	1	Rony	3x (yellow card)	Atlético Mineiro (H)	Copa Sudamericana
23 August	1	João Schmidt	3x (yellow card)	Corinthians (A)	Série A
30 August	1	Lucas Veríssimo	3x (yellow card)	Internacional (A)	Série A
30 August	1	Álvaro Barreal	3x (yellow card)	Internacional (A)	Série A
6 September	1	Gonzalo Escobar	3x (yellow card)	Cruzeiro (H)	Série A
6 September	1	Gabriel Barbosa	3x (yellow card)	Cruzeiro (H)	Série A
13 September	1	Everton	3x (yellow card)	Remo (A)	Série A
19 September	1	Luan Peres	3x (yellow card)	São Paulo (A)	Série A
19 September	1	Gabriel Bontempo	3x (yellow card)	São Paulo (A)	Série A
8 October	1	Gustavo Henrique	3x (yellow card)	Atlético Mineiro (A)	Série A
11 October	1	Willian Arão	3x (yellow card)	Fluminense (A)	Série A
24 October	3	Neymar	3x (yellow card); (red card) vs Bahia	Palmeiras (H), Red Bull Bragantino (A) and Coritiba (A)	Série A
28 October	1	João Schmidt	3x (yellow card)	Red Bull Bragantino (A)	Série A
2 November	1	Luan Peres	3x (yellow card)	Coritiba (A)	Série A
2 November	1	Álvaro Barreal	3x (yellow card)	Coritiba (A)	Série A

Source: Match reports in Competitive matches

== Coaches ==
Name	Nat.	Place of Birth	Date of Birth (Age)	Signed from	Date signed	Role	G	W	D	L	%	Departure	Manner	Contract End
Juan Pablo Vojvoda	(Argentina)	General Baldissera	13 January 1975 (age 51)	Free agent	22 August 2025	Permanent	15	4	5	6	26.67	19 March 2026	Sacked	31 December 2026
Gastón Liendo	(Argentina)	Rosario	24 May 1974 (age 52)	Staff	15 March 2026	Interim (Note: Interim for the match against Corinthians as Vojvoda was suspended)	1	0	1	0	0.00	15 March 2026	Return (Note: Back to assistant role after the match)	—N/a
Cuca	(Brazil)	Curitiba (Paraná (state))	7 June 1963 (age 63)	Free agent	19 March 2026	Permanent	44	18	16	10	40.91			31 December 2026
Cuquinha	(Brazil)	Curitiba (Paraná (state))	5 June 1969 (age 57)	Free agent	19 April 2026 (Note: Interim for the match against Fluminense as Cuca was suspended)	Interim	1	0	0	1	0.00	19 April 2026	Return	31 December 2026

== Transfers ==
=== Transfers in ===
N.	Pos.	Name	Age	Moving from	Type	Fee	Source
22	LM	(Argentina) Álvaro Barreal	25	(United States) FC Cincinnati	Transfer	US$ 4M	
27	CB	(Brazil) Zé Ivaldo	28	(Brazil) Cruzeiro	Transfer	US$ 1M	
11	ST	(Brazil) Rony	30	(Brazil) Atlético Mineiro	Transfer	€ 3M	
21	LW	(Brazil) Moisés	29	(Brazil) Fortaleza	Transfer	€ 2M	
28	DM	(Uruguay) Christian Oliva	29	(Uruguay) Nacional	Transfer	US$ 1.5M	
4	CB	(Brazil) Lucas Veríssimo	30	(Qatar) Al-Duhail	Transfer	US$ 4M	
34	GK	(Brazil) João Paulo	31	(Brazil) Bahia	Loan return	Free	
17	RW	(Paraguay) Gustavo Caballero	24	(England) Portsmouth	Loan return	Free	
6	CM	(Brazil) Arthur Melo	30	(Italy) Juventus	Transfer	Free	
23	RB	(Brazil) Rodinei	34	(Greece) Olympiacos	Transfer	Free	
7	LW	(Brazil) Everton	30	(Brazil) Flamengo	Transfer	Free	
11	AM	(Brazil) Philippe Coutinho	34	Free agent	Transfer	Free	

=== Loans in ===
N.	Pos.	Name	Age	Loaned from	Loan expires	Fee	Source
9	ST	(Brazil) Gabriel	29	(Brazil) Cruzeiro	December 2026	Free	
25	DM	(Brazil) Gabriel Menino	25	(Brazil) Atlético Mineiro	December 2026	Free	
45	AM	(Brazil) Lima	30	(Brazil) Fluminense	December 2026	Free	

=== Transfers out ===
N.	Pos.	Name	Age	Moving to	Type	Fee	Source
—	CB	(Brazil) Luiz Felipe	32	(Brazil) Goiás	Contract ended	Free	
—	CB	(Brazil) Messias	31	(Brazil) Juventude	Contract ended	Free	
—	AM	(Brazil) Ed Carlos	24	(Brazil) Botafogo-PB	Contract rescinded	Free	
—	CM	(Brazil) Kevin Malthus	22	(Brazil) EC São Bernardo	Contract rescinded	Free	
11	LW	(Brazil) Guilherme	30	(United States) Houston Dynamo	Transfer	US$ 2.1M	
33	LB	(Brazil) Souza	19	(England) Tottenham Hotspur	Transfer	€ 15M	
—	AM	(Brazil) Victor Hugo	21	(Brazil) Flamengo	Loan return	US$ 250,000	
—	SS	(Colombia) Alfredo Morelos	29	(Colombia) Atlético Nacional	Transfer	Free	
13	CB	(Brazil) João Basso	29	(Brazil) Cuiabá	Contract rescinded	Free	
45	ST	(Brazil) Rafael Freitas	20	(Brazil) Guarani	Loan return	Free	
8	DM	(Venezuela) Tomás Rincón	38	Free agent	Constract rescinded	Free	
21	ST	(Argentina) Lautaro Díaz	28	(Brazil) Cruzeiro	Loan rescinded	Free	
—	ST	(Brazil) Tiquinho Soares	35	(Brazil) Botafogo	Contract rescinded	Free	
6	DM	(Brazil) Zé Rafael	33	(Portugal) Alverca	Contract rescinded	Free	
12	RB	(Brazil) Mayke	33	Free agent	Contract rescinded	Free	
—	CB	(Brazil) Alex Nascimento	27	(Saudi Arabia) Al-Okhdood	Contract rescinded	Free	
98	CB	(Argentina) Adonis Frías	28	(Mexico) Atlas	Transfer	US$ 3.75M	
—	DM	(Brazil) Sandry	24	Free agent	Contract rescinded	Free	

=== Loans out ===
N.	Pos.	Name	Age	Loaned to	Loan expires	Source
25	CB	(Brazil) Luisão	22	(Brazil) Goiás	November 2026	
—	LW	(Brazil) Andrey Quintino	23	(Brazil) Confiança	November 2026	
82	GK	(Brazil) João Fernandes	21	(Brazil) Confiança	November 2026	
—	AM	(Brazil) Patrick	33	(Brazil) Remo	December 2026	
—	DM	(Brazil) Hyan	21	(Brazil) Avaí	November 2026	
—	DM	(Brazil) Sandry	23	(Brazil) Criciúma	November 2026	
—	ST	(Bolivia) Enzo Monteiro	21	(South Korea) Chungbuk Cheongju	December 2026	
—	RB	(Brazil) Hayner	30	(Brazil) Vila Nova	November 2026	
—	RB	(Brazil) Nathan Santos	24	(Brazil) Juventude	November 2026	
—	LW	(Brazil) Felipe Laurindo	21	(Brazil) Cianorte	September 2026	
—	LB	(Brazil) Kevyson	21	(Brazil) Ponte Preta	November 2026	
17	RW	(Paraguay) Gustavo Caballero	24	(England) Portsmouth	June 2026	
21	RW	(Algeria) Billal Brahimi	25	(Portugal) Estrela da Amadora	June 2026	
—	RW	(Brazil) Enzo Boer	21	(Brazil) Santo André	May 2026	
29	ST	(Brazil) Tiquinho Soares	35	(Brazil) Mirassol	December 2026	
—	AM	(Brazil) Bernardo	20	(Brazil) Amazonas	November 2026	
4	CB	(Paraguay) Alexis Duarte	25	(Paraguay) Libertad	December 2026	
44	RB	(Brazil) JP Chermont	20	(Brazil) Coritiba	December 2026	
—	CB	(Brazil) Alex Nascimento	27	(Brazil) Ponte Preta	November 2026	
2	CB	(Brazil) Zé Ivaldo	29	(Brazil) Remo	December 2026	
7	RW	(Brazil) Robinho Júnior	18	(Italy) Genoa	June 2027	

== Pre-season and friendlies ==
4 July 2026 Friendly	Santos (Brazil)	3–0	(Brazil) União São João	São Paulo
11:00 UTC−3	Moisés 46'; Ananias 81'; Robinho Jr 85' (pen.)	Report		Stadium: Pacaembu; Attendance: 10,054; Referee: Guilherme Francisco Maciel da Silva e Rosário

== Competitions ==
=== Overview ===
Competition	First match	Last match	Starting round	Final position	Record							
Competition	First match	Last match	Starting round	Final position	Pld	W	D	L	GF	GA	GD	Win %
Série A	28 January 2026	2 December 2026	Matchday 1	TBD	34	12	11	11	50	49	+1	35.29
Copa do Brasil	22 April 2026	3 September 2026	Fifth round	Quarter-finals	6	2	3	1	3	3	+0	33.33
Campeonato Paulista	10 January 2026	22 February 2026	League phase	Quarter-finals	9	3	3	3	13	9	+4	33.33
Copa Sudamericana	8 April 2026	16 September 2026	Group stage	Quarter-finals	12	5	5	2	22	14	+8	41.67
Total					61	22	22	17	88	75	+13	36.07

Last updated: 2 November 2026
Source: Competitions

=== Campeonato Paulista ===
==== Results summary ====
Overall								Home						Away					
Pld	W	D	L	GF	GA	GD	Pts	W	D	L	GF	GA	GD	W	D	L	GF	GA	GD
9	3	3	3	13	9	+4	12	2	2	0	9	2	+7	1	1	3	4	7	−3

==== Results by round ====
Round	1	2	3	4	5	6	7	8
Ground	H	A	A	H	H	A	A	H
Result	W	L	D	D	D	L	W	W
Position	4	9	8	9	11	14	10	8
Points	3	3	4	5	6	6	9	12

Source: Soccerway
A = Away; H = Home; W = Win; D = Draw; L = Loss; P = Postponed

==== League phase ====
Pos	Team	Pld	W	D	L	GF	GA	GD	Pts	Qualification
6	São Paulo	8	4	1	3	11	12	−1	13	Qualification for the Quarter-finals
7	Capivariano	8	4	1	3	7	10	−3	13	Qualification for the Quarter-finals
8	Santos	8	3	3	2	12	7	+5	12	Qualification for the Quarter-finals
9	Guarani	8	3	3	2	6	7	−1	12	
10	Botafogo	8	3	2	3	5	9	−4	11	

Source: FPF
Rules for classification: 1) points; 2) wins; 3) goal difference; 4) goals scored; 5) head-to-head results (only between 2 teams); 6) fewest red cards; 7) fewest yellow cards; 8) draw.

==== Matches ====
10 January 1	Santos	2–1	Novorizontino	Santos
16:00 UTC-03:00	Rollheiser (yellow card) 32'; Gabriel 51'; Willian Arão (yellow card) 52'; Zé Ivaldo (yellow card) 56'; Gustavo Henrique (yellow card) 81'; Thaciano 87'	Report	25' Diego Galo; (yellow card) 90+2' Léo Naldi	Stadium: Vila Belmiro; Attendance: 13,091; Referee: Flávio Rodrigues de Souza

14 January 2	Palmeiras	1–0	Santos	Barueri
19:30 UTC-03:00	Allan 41'; José López (yellow card) 79'; Luighi (yellow card) 87'	Report	(yellow card) 13' Igor Vinícius; (yellow card) 37' Frías	Stadium: Arena Barueri; Attendance: 21,342; Referee: João Vitor Gobi

18 January 3	Guarani	1–1	Santos	Campinas
20:30 UTC-03:00	Maranhão (yellow card) 34'; Mirandinha (penalty missed) 52'; Isaque (yellow card) 55'; Kauã Jesus (yellow card) 90+2'; Kewen 90+7'	Report	(yellow card) 26' Thaciano; 59', (yellow card) 90+2' Barreal	Stadium: Estádio Brinco de Ouro; Attendance: 10,198; Referee: Matheus Delgado Candançan

22 January 4	Santos	1–1	Corinthians	Santos
19:30 UTC-03:00	Igor Vinícius (yellow card) 43'; Willian Arão (yellow card) 48'; Gabriel Menino (yellow card) 59'; Gabriel (yellow card) 62', (goal) 90+4'; Mayke (yellow card) 64'; Frías (yellow card) 64'; Robinho Júnior (yellow card) 81'	Report	(penalty missed) 14', 16' Yuri Alberto; (yellow card) 58' André Ramalho; (yellow card) 60' Matheus Pereira; (yellow card) 62' Carrillo; (yellow card) 79' André; (yellow card) 90+3' Gustavo Henrique	Stadium: Vila Belmiro; Attendance: 8,588; Referee: Lucas Canetto Bellote

25 January 5	Santos	0–0	Red Bull Bragantino	São Paulo
16:00 UTC-03:00	Escobar (yellow card) 62'	Report	(yellow card) 34' Sasha; (yellow card) 35' Lucas Barbosa; (yellow card) 83' Gabriel; (yellow card) 87' Sosa	Stadium: Neo Química Arena; Attendance: 30,609; Referee: Daiane Muniz

31 January 6	São Paulo	2–0	Santos	São Paulo
20:30 UTC-03:00	Enzo Díaz (yellow card) 18'; Sabino (yellow card) 45+3'; Tapia 51'; Luciano 56'	Report	(yellow card) 11' Miguelito; (yellow card) 18' (yellow-red card) 36' Gabriel Menino; (yellow card) 42' Rony; (yellow card) 78' Escobar	Stadium: Morumbi; Attendance: 49,605; Referee: João Vitor Gobi

8 February 7	Noroeste	1–2	Santos	Bauru
16:00 UTC-03:00	Pedro Carrerette 15'; Thiago Lopes (red card) 45+5'; Marlyson (yellow card) 75'	Report	3' Escobar; 29' Rony; (yellow card) 54' Miguelito; (yellow card) 73' Igor Vinícius; (yellow card) 88' Zé Ivaldo	Stadium: Estádio Alfredo de Castilho; Attendance: 9,358; Referee: Flávio Rodrigues de Souza

15 February 8	Santos	6–0	Velo Clube	Santos
20:30 UTC-03:00	Gabriel 6', 81'; Moisés 18'; Thaciano 23'; Gabriel Menino 69'; Rollheiser 83'	Report	(yellow card) 17' Rodrigo; (red card) 57' Luiz Otávio; (yellow card) 67' Thomas Luciano; (yellow card) 78' Islan	Stadium: Vila Belmiro; Attendance: 13,422; Referee: Raphael Claus

==== Knockout stage ====
===== Quarter-final =====
22 February Single match	Novorizontino	2–1	Santos	Novo Horizonte
16:00 UTC-03:00	Rômulo 45+1'; Juninho (yellow card) 88'; Léo Naldi 90+6'	Report	65' Bontempo; (yellow card) 90+1' Luan Peres	Stadium: Estádio Doutor Jorge Ismael de Biasi; Attendance: 10,417; Referee: Flávio Rodrigues de Souza

=== Copa Sudamericana ===
==== Group stage ====
Pos	Team	Pld	W	D	L	GF	GA	GD	Pts	Qualification
1	(Paraguay) Recoleta	6	1	5	0	6	5	+1	8	Advance to round of 16
2	(Brazil) Santos	6	1	4	1	8	6	+2	7	Advance to knockout round play-offs
3	(Argentina) San Lorenzo	6	1	4	1	6	5	+1	7	
4	(Ecuador) Deportivo Cuenca	6	1	3	2	3	7	−4	6	

Source: CONMEBOL

8 April 1	Deportivo Cuenca (Ecuador)	1–0	(Brazil) Santos	Cuenca, Ecuador
19:00 UTC−03:00	Brazão 60' (o.g.); Boolsen (yellow card) 70'; Ordóñez (yellow card) 86'	Report	(yellow card) 86' Lucas Veríssimo	Stadium: Estadio Alejandro Serrano Aguilar; Referee: Gery Vargas (Bolivia)

14 April 2	Santos (Brazil)	1–1	(Paraguay) Recoleta	Santos, Brazil
21:30 UTC−03:00	Neymar 4', (yellow card) 33'; Bontempo (yellow card) 42'	Report	(yellow card) 23' Marcos Pereira; 45+1' (pen.), (yellow card) 89' Ortiz; (yellow card) 79' Galeano; (yellow card) 84' Toledo	Stadium: Vila Belmiro; Attendance: 9,648; Referee: Fernando Véjar (Chile)

28 April 3	San Lorenzo (Argentina)	1–1	(Brazil) Santos	Buenos Aires, Argentina
19:00 UTC−03:00	Cuello 27'	Report	33' Gabriel; (yellow card) 46' Luan Peres; (yellow card) 76' Escobar; (yellow card) 88' Lucas Veríssimo	Stadium: Estadio Pedro Bidegain; Referee: Jhon Ospina (Colombia)

5 May 4	Recoleta (Paraguay)	1–1	(Brazil) Santos	Pedro Juan Caballero, Paraguay
21:30 UTC−03:00	Ronal Domínguez (yellow card) 48'; Báez (yellow card) 59'; Brahian Ferreira (yellow card) 80'; Cardozo (yellow card) 81'; Galeano 86'	Report	41' Neymar; (yellow card) 90+1' Rony	Stadium: Estadio Río Parapití; Referee: Cristian Garay (Chile)

20 May 5	Santos (Brazil)	2–2	(Argentina) San Lorenzo	Santos, Brazil
19:00 UTC−03:00	Bontempo 1'; Lucas Veríssimo (yellow card) 14'; Gabriel 45+2'; Willian Arão (yellow card) 57'; Igor Vinícius (yellow card) 90+5'	Report	(yellow card) 44' Insaurralde; (yellow card) 55' Tripichio; 72' De Ritis; (yellow card) 74' Montenegro; 85' Auzmendi	Stadium: Vila Belmiro; Attendance: 6,948; Referee: Alexis Herrera (Venezuela)

26 May 6	Santos (Brazil)	3–0	(Ecuador) Deportivo Cuenca	Santos, Brazil
21:30 UTC−03:00	Gabriel 14'; Gustavo Henrique (yellow card) 26'; Frías (yellow card) 43'; Ferrero 49' (o.g.); Bontempo 56'; Luan Peres (yellow card) 60'	Report	(yellow card) 16' Boolsen; (yellow card) 46' Andrés López; (yellow card) 62' Chacón; (yellow card) 74' Piedra	Stadium: Vila Belmiro; Attendance: 7,060; Referee: Jhon Ospina (Colombia)

==== Knockout round play-offs ====
The draw for the final stage was held on 29 May 2026.

21 July First leg	Universidad Central (Venezuela)	1–4	(Brazil) Santos	Valencia, Venezuela
21:30 UTC−3	Solé (yellow card) 22'; Sosa (yellow card) 73'; Ruiz 87'	Report	(yellow card) 22', (goal) 57' Gabriel Menino; 35' Bontempo; 67' Thaciano; 84' Rony; (yellow card) 86' Escobar	Stadium: Estadio Misael Delgado; Referee: Gery Vargas (Bolivia)

28 July Second leg	Santos (Brazil)	4–2 (8–3 agg.)	(Venezuela) Universidad Central	Santos, Brazil
21:30 UTC−3	Terceros 39'; Gabriel 56'; Menino 65'; Rony 90+5'	Report	1' Sosa; (yellow card) 29' Solé; (yellow card) 45+3' Lugo; 72' Mottes	Stadium: Vila Belmiro; Attendance: 6,864; Referee: Carlos Benítez (Paraguay)

==== Round of 16 ====
13 August First leg	Santos (Brazil)	2–1	(Ecuador) Macará	Santos, Brazil
19:00 UTC−3	Gabriel 44', (yellow card) 77'; Escobar (yellow card) 62'; Arão 76'; Barreal (yellow card) 82'; Rony (yellow card) 90+5'	Report	5' Posse; (yellow card) 45+5' Ayala; (yellow card) 73' Cazares; (yellow card) 77' Rodríguez; (yellow card) 80' Estacio; (yellow card) 90' Mohor; (yellow card) 90+2' Bolanos	Stadium: Vila Belmiro; Attendance: 10,257; Referee: Kevin Ortega (Peru)

20 August Second leg	Macará (Ecuador)	0–0 (1–2 agg.)	(Brazil) Santos	Ambato, Ecuador
19:00 UTC−3	Bolanos (yellow card) 62'	Report	(yellow card) 12' Gustavo Henrique; (yellow card) 90' Rony	Stadium: Estadio Bellavista; Referee: Cristián Garay (Chile)

==== Quarter-finals ====
9 September First leg	Santos (Brazil)	2–0	(Brazil) Atlético Mineiro	Santos, Brazil
19:00 UTC−3	Arão 31'; Oliva 68'	Report		Stadium: Vila Belmiro; Attendance: 12,132; Referee: Alexis Herrera (Venezuela)

16 September Second leg	Atlético Mineiro (Brazil)	4–2 (4–4 agg.) (3–1 p)	(Brazil) Santos	Belo Horizonte, Brazil
19:00 UTC−3	Bernard 1'; Reinier 20', 41'; Cuello 90+2'	Report	28' (o.g.) Lyanco; (yellow card) 38' Rodinei; (yellow card) 45+4' Luan Peres; 72' Gabriel	Stadium: Arena MRV; Attendance: 40,013; Referee: Facundo Tello (Argentina)
	Penalties
	Scarpa (penalty scored); Igor Gomes (penalty scored); Fred (penalty missed); Borbas (penalty scored)		(penalty missed) Gabriel; (penalty missed) João Schmidt; (penalty scored) Bontempo; (penalty missed) Arthur

=== Série A ===
==== League table ====
Pos	Team	Pld	W	D	L	GF	GA	GD	Pts	Qualification or relegation
7	Atlético Mineiro	34	14	8	12	44	40	+4	50	Qualification for Copa Sudamericana group stage
8	Red Bull Bragantino	34	13	8	13	44	39	+5	47	Qualification for Copa Sudamericana group stage
9	Santos	34	12	11	11	50	49	+1	47	Qualification for Copa Sudamericana group stage
10	São Paulo	34	12	8	14	39	39	0	44	Qualification for Copa Sudamericana group stage
11	Botafogo	34	11	9	14	46	53	−7	42	Qualification for Copa Sudamericana group stage

Updated to match(es) played on 6 November 2026. Source: CBF
Rules for classification: 1) points; 2) wins; 3) goal difference; 4) goals scored; 5) head-to-head results (only between two teams); 6) fewest red cards; 7) fewest yellow cards; 8) drawing of lots.

==== Results summary ====
Overall								Home						Away					
Pld	W	D	L	GF	GA	GD	Pts	W	D	L	GF	GA	GD	W	D	L	GF	GA	GD
34	12	11	11	50	49	+1	47	6	7	4	23	21	+2	6	4	7	27	28	−1

==== Results by round ====
Round	1	2	3	4	5	6	7	8	9	10	11	12	13	14	15	16	17	18	19	20	21	22	23	24	25	26	27	28	29	30	31	32	33	34	35	36	37	38
Ground	A	H	A	H	A	H	H	A	H	A	H	H	A	A	H	H	A	H	A	H	A	H	A	H	A	A	H	A	H	A	A	H	H	A	A	H	A	H
Result	L	D	L	W	D	D	L	L	W	L	W	L	D	D	W	L	L	W	L	D	W	L	W	D	W	W	W	W	D	L	W	D	D	L				
Position	18	17	18	13	14	14	16	16	13	15	15	15	17	16	15	16	17	15	15	14	8	17	14	14	13	13	10	8	8	8	8	8	8	9				

Source: Globo Esporte
P = Postponed

==== Matches ====
28 January 1	Chapecoense	4–2	Santos	Chapecó
20:00 UTC-03:00	Clar 16' (pen.); Marcos Vinícius (yellow card) 40'; Camilo (yellow card) 63'; Meritão 73'; Jean Carlos 80'; Léo (yellow card) 85'; Carvalheira 90'	Report	(yellow card) 7' Duarte; (yellow card) 15' Brazão; 45+2', (yellow card) 81' Gabriel Menino; 67' Barreal	Stadium: Arena Condá; Attendance: 17,551; Referee: Sávio Pereira Sampaio

4 February 2	Santos	1–1	São Paulo	Santos
20:00 UTC-03:00	Frías (yellow card) 18'; Rony (yellow card) 30'; Zé Rafael 45+6', (yellow card) 53'; João Schmidt (yellow card) 71'; Escobar (yellow card) 74'	Report	(yellow card) 37' Franco; 66' Calleri	Stadium: Vila Belmiro; Attendance: 10,280; Referee: Anderson Daronco

12 February 3	Athletico Paranaense	2–1	Santos	Curitiba
19:00 UTC-03:00	Julimar 6' (pen.); Chiqueti (yellow card) 87'; Viveros 90+1'	Report	17' Thaciano; (yellow card) 27' Bontempo; (yellow card) 74' Igor Vinícius; (yellow card) 90+3' Vinicius Lira	Stadium: Arena da Baixada; Attendance: 27,083; Referee: Ramon Abatti Abel

26 February 4	Santos	2–1	Vasco	Santos
19:00 UTC-03:00	Neymar 25', 61', (yellow card) 29'; Brazão (yellow card) 88'	Report	(yellow card) 29' Thiago Mendes; 43' Cauan Barros	Stadium: Vila Belmiro; Attendance: 8,808; Referee: Rafael Rodrigo Klein

10 March 5	Mirassol	2–2	Santos	Mirassol
21:30 UTC-03:00	Igor Formiga 21'; Willian Machado (yellow card) 65'; Negueba 71'	Report	(yellow card) 55' João Schmidt; 80', 88' (pen.), (yellow card) 90+1' Gabriel	Stadium: Estádio José Maria de Campos Maia; Attendance: 8,152; Referee: Raphael Claus

15 March 6	Santos	1–1	Corinthians	Santos
16:00 UTC-03:00	Gabriel 22'; Barreal (yellow card) 24'; Rony (yellow card) 62'; Rollheiser (yellow card) 86'; Luan Peres (yellow card) 86' (yellow-red card) 88'	Report	(yellow card) 11' Kaio César; 19' Depay; (yellow card) 90+5' Gustavo Henrique	Stadium: Vila Belmiro; Attendance: 15,008; Referee: Flávio Rodrigues de Souza

18 March 7	Santos	1–2	Internacional	Santos
21:30 UTC-03:00	Escobar (yellow card) 14'; Neymar 57' (pen.), (yellow card) 58'; Zé Ivaldo (yellow card) 73'; Igor Vinícius (yellow card) 90+3'	Report	47' (o.g.) Zé Ivaldo; (yellow card) 50' Félix Torres; (yellow card) 56' Vitinho; 90+5', (yellow card) 90+5' Carbonero	Stadium: Vila Belmiro; Attendance: 10,031; Referee: Davi de Oliveira Lacerda

22 March 8	Cruzeiro	0–0	Santos	Belo Horizonte
16:00 UTC-03:00	William (yellow card) 12'; Matheus Pereira (yellow card) 83'	Report	(yellow card) 6' Barreal; (yellow card) 45+1' Gustavo Henrique; (yellow card) 84' Rincón; (yellow card) 90+9' Gabriel Menino	Stadium: Mineirão; Attendance: 43,252; Referee: Ramon Abatti Abel

2 April 9	Santos	2–0	Remo	Santos
19:00 UTC-03:00	Thaciano 41', (yellow card) 42'; Gustavo Henrique (yellow card) 59'; Rony (yellow card) 71'; Moisés 83'; Neymar (yellow card) 87'	Report	(yellow card) 6' Zé Ricardo; (yellow card) 57' Zé Welison	Stadium: Vila Belmiro; Attendance: 12,242; Referee: Sávio Pereira Sampaio

5 April 10	Flamengo	3–1	Santos	Rio de Janeiro
17:30 UTC-03:00	Pedro 64'; Jorginho 71' (pen.); Paquetá 89'	Report	48' Díaz; (yellow card) 53' Bontempo; (yellow card) 67' Barreal	Stadium: Maracanã; Attendance: 68,615; Referee: Anderson Daronco

11 April 11	Santos	1–0	Atlético Mineiro	Santos
20:00 UTC-03:00	Escobar (yellow card) 10'; Gabriel (yellow card) 21'; Luan Peres (yellow card) 31'; Moisés 63'	Report	(yellow card) 32' Lyanco	Stadium: Vila Belmiro; Attendance: 12,175; Referee: Rafael Rodrigo Klein

19 April 12	Santos	2–3	Fluminense	Santos
16:00 UTC-03:00	Gabriel 9', (yellow card) 33'; Igor Vinícius (yellow card) 20'; Gustavo Henrique (yellow card) 25'; Barreal 57'; Lucas Veríssimo (yellow card) 65'; Luan Peres (yellow card) 89'	Report	24' Savarino; (yellow card) 33' Bernal; (yellow card) 45+3' Alisson; 60' Castillo; 86' John Kennedy; (yellow card) 90+2' Otávio	Stadium: Vila Belmiro; Attendance: 14,179; Referee: Wilton Pereira Sampaio

25 April 13	Bahia	2–2	Santos	Salvador
18:30 UTC-03:00	Erick Pulga (yellow card) 21'; Ramos Mingo (yellow card) 59'; Luciano Juba 76'; Willian José 83'; Éverton Ribeiro (yellow card) 90+5'	Report	22' (pen.), 45+3' Rollheiser; (yellow card) 53' Diógenes; (yellow card) 72' Terceros; (yellow card) 82' Mayke; (yellow card) 89' Escobar	Stadium: Arena Fonte Nova; Attendance: 33,894; Referee: Ramon Abatti Abel

2 May 14	Palmeiras	1–1	Santos	São Paulo
18:30 UTC-03:00	José López 64'; Luis Pacheco (yellow card) 90+9'	Report	26' Rollheiser; (yellow card) 32' Brazão	Stadium: Allianz Parque; Attendance: 41,282; Referee: Raphael Claus

10 May 15	Santos	2–0	Red Bull Bragantino	Santos
18:30 UTC-03:00	Neymar 45+5', (yellow card) 79'; Frías 76'	Report	(yellow card) 7' Lucas Barbosa; (yellow card) 16' Pitta; (yellow card) 45+1' Gabriel; (yellow card) 75' Alix Vinicius	Stadium: Vila Belmiro; Attendance: 6,291; Referee: Alex Gomes Stefano

17 May 16	Santos	0–3	Coritiba	São Paulo
11:00 UTC-03:00	Escobar (yellow card) 36'; Neymar (yellow card) 66'; Barreal (red card) 72'; Gabriel (yellow card) 90+2'; João Ananias (yellow card) 90+4'	Report	4', 19' Breno Lopes; (yellow card) 15' Taverna; 38' (pen.), (yellow card) 83' Josué	Stadium: Neo Química Arena; Attendance: 45,662; Referee: Paulo César Zanovelli da Silva

23 May 17	Grêmio	3–2	Santos	Porto Alegre
19:00 UTC-03:00	Pavon (yellow card) 29'; Carlos Vinícius 40', 59'; Tetê 63'	Report	(yellow card) 9' Igor Vinícius; 32', 55' Gabriel; (yellow card) 45' (yellow-red card) 84' Gustavo Henrique	Stadium: Arena do Grêmio; Attendance: 37,385; Referee: Bruno Arleu de Araújo

30 May 18	Santos	3–1	Vitória	Santos
20:00 UTC-03:00	Willian Arão (yellow card) 16'; Terceros 19'; Barreal 54'; Gabriel 56', (yellow card) 57', (red card) 60'; Brazão (yellow card) 79'	Report	(yellow card) 21' Caíque; (yellow card) 45+4', (goal) 74' Renê; (yellow card) 53' Emmanuel Martínez; (yellow card) 90+1' Luan Cândido	Stadium: Vila Belmiro; Attendance: 11,172; Referee: Rafael Rodrigo Klein

16 July 19	Botafogo	2–1	Santos	Rio de Janeiro
19:30 UTC-03:00	Huguinho (yellow card) 25'; Lucas Emanuel 41'; Matheus Martins (yellow card) 45+3'; Ferraresi (yellow card) 78'; Barría 90+5', (yellow card) 90+5'	Report	(yellow card) 26' Thaciano; (yellow card) 45+3', (goal) 57' Barreal	Stadium: Estádio Nilton Santos; Attendance: 15,585; Referee: Rodrigo José Pereira de Lima

25 July 20	Santos	2–2	Chapecoense	Santos
18:30 UTC-03:00	Neymar 36', 89' (pen.), (yellow card) 75'; Lucas Veríssimo (yellow card) 68'; Barreal (yellow card) 77'	Report	51' Marcinho; (yellow card) 54' Camilo; 62' (o.g.) João Ananias; (yellow card) 73' Matheus Aurélio; (yellow card) 75' Bruno Tubarão; (yellow card) 88' Bruno Matias	Stadium: Vila Belmiro; Attendance: 12,121; Referee: Fernando Antônio Mendes de Salles Nascimento Filho

9 August 22	Santos	0–2	Athletico Paranaense	Santos
18:30 UTC-03:00	Frías (yellow card) 20'	Report	14', 26', (yellow card) 34' Viveros	Stadium: Vila Belmiro; Attendance: 7,026; Referee: Rafael Rodrigo Klein

16 August 23	Vasco	0–3	Santos	Rio de Janeiro
16:00 UTC-03:00	Robert Renan (yellow card) 39'; Paulo Henrique (yellow card) 84'	Report	68' Gabriel; 77' Arão; 81' Luan Peres; (yellow card) 81' João Paulo	Stadium: São Januário; Attendance: 20,430; Referee: Lucas Casagrande

23 August 24	Santos	1–1	Mirassol	Santos
18:30 UTC-03:00	João Schmidt (yellow card) 20'; Barreal 68'; Neymar (yellow card) 88'	Report	(yellow card) 22' Gabriel; (yellow card) 24' Neto Moura; 36' Carlos Eduardo; (red card) 73' Wallisson; (yellow card) 76' Igor Formiga	Stadium: Vila Belmiro; Attendance: 14,751; Referee: Edina Alves Batista

30 August 25	Corinthians	0–1	Santos	São Paulo
16:00 UTC-03:00	Gabriel Paulista (yellow card) 31'; Garro (yellow card) 45+2'; Raniele (yellow card) 45+4'; Hugo Souza (yellow card) 90+8'	Report	(yellow card) 10' Barreal; (yellow card) 20' Willian Arão; 33' Oliva; (yellow card) 45+4' Lucas Veríssimo	Stadium: Neo Química Arena; Attendance: 47,496; Referee: Wilton Pereira Sampaio

6 September 26	Internacional	2–3	Santos	Porto Alegre
16:00 UTC-03:00	Matheus Bahia (red card) 28'; Aguirre 49', (yellow card) 78'; Ronaldo (yellow card) 65'; Vitinho (yellow card) 69'; Paulinho (yellow card) 69'; Bruno Henrique 90+1' (pen.)	Report	(yellow card) 5' Rollheiser; 8', 29' Gabriel; 39' Oliva; (yellow card) 69' Escobar; (yellow card) 69' Gustavo Henrique	Stadium: Estádio Beira-Rio; Attendance: 23,748; Referee: Alex Gomes Stefano

13 September 27	Santos	2–1	Cruzeiro	Santos
UTC-03:00	Rollheiser 28'; Bontempo 32'; Everton (yellow card) 65'; Rony (yellow card) 78'; Brazão (yellow card) 82'	Report	(yellow card) 45+5' Kaio Jorge; 90' Matheus Pereira; (yellow card) 90+4' Fabrício Bruno	Stadium: Vila Belmiro; Attendance: 13,877; Referee: Bruno Arleu de Araújo

20 September 28	Remo	1–2	Santos	Belém
UTC-03:00	Zé Welison (yellow card) 53'; Marllon 83'; Poveda (yellow card) 85' (yellow-red card) 90+2'	Report	(yellow card) 19' Escobar; (yellow card) 73', (goal) 87' Gabriel; 78' Rony; (yellow card) 90+2' Luan Peres; (yellow card) 90+3' Bontempo	Stadium: Mangueirão; Attendance: 43,658; Referee: Wilton Pereira Sampaio

2 October 21	São Paulo	1–2	Santos	São Paulo
20:00 UTC-03:00	Luciano 34' (pen.), (yellow card) 41'	Report	(yellow card) 33' Lucas Veríssimo; 36', 54' Gabriel; (yellow card) 45' Oliva; (yellow card) 76' Everton	Stadium: Morumbi; Attendance: 43,398; Referee: Matheus Delgado Candançan

8 October 29	Santos	2–2	Flamengo	Santos
19:30 UTC-03:00	Escobar (yellow card) 12'; Gustavo Henrique (yellow card) 35'; Barreal (yellow card) 36'; Neymar (yellow card) 53', (goal) 82' (pen.), 88' (pen.); Oliva (yellow card) 57'; Rodinei (yellow card) 61'	Report	(yellow card) 42' Pedro; 43' Danilo; 45+4', (yellow card) 55' Paquetá; (red card) 79' Jorginho; (yellow card) 85' Bruno Henrique; (yellow card) 90+2' Royal	Stadium: Vila Belmiro; Attendance: 16,600; Referee: Anderson Daronco

11 October 30	Atlético Mineiro	2–1	Santos	Belo Horizonte
16:00 UTC-03:00	Alan Franco (yellow card) 45+2'; Borbas (yellow card) 66', (goal) 90+7'; Igor Gomes (yellow card) 70'; Vitor Hugo 90'	Report	(yellow card) 45+4' Lucas Veríssimo; (yellow card) 66' Luan Peres; (yellow card) 85' João Schmidt; 88', (yellow card) 89' Gabriel; (yellow card) 90' Willian Arão	Stadium: Arena MRV; Attendance: 29,777; Referee: Alex Gomes Stefano

18 October 31	Fluminense	1–2	Santos	Rio de Janeiro
16:00 UTC-03:00	Castillo 4'; Canobbio (yellow card) 31'; Savarino (yellow card) 90+5'	Report	(yellow card) 25' Barreal; 49' Gabriel; 54' Philippe Coutinho	Stadium: Maracanã; Attendance: 27,697; Referee: Ramon Abatti Abel

24 October 32	Santos	1–1	Bahia	Santos
21:00 UTC-03:00	Neymar (yellow card) 31', (red card) 45'; João Schmidt (yellow card) 89'; Luan Peres 90+3'	Report	38' Luciano Juba; (yellow card) 44' Acevedo; (yellow card) 50' Kanu	Stadium: Vila Belmiro; Attendance: 14,656; Referee: Sávio Pereira Sampaio

28 October 33	Santos	0–0	Palmeiras	Santos
19:30 UTC-03:00	Coutinho (yellow card) 38'; Bontempo (yellow card) 78'; João Schmidt (yellow card) 87'	Report	(yellow card) 38' Marlon Freitas; (yellow card) 60' Piquerez; (yellow card) 67' Barboza; (yellow card) 84' Giay	Stadium: Vila Belmiro; Attendance: 13,655; Referee: Flávio Rodrigues de Souza

2 November 34	Red Bull Bragantino	2–1	Santos	Bragança Paulista
20:00 UTC-03:00	Rodinei 4' (o.g.); Wallace Yan 41'; Lucas Barbosa (yellow card) 45'	Report	(yellow card) 20' João Alencar; 37' Coutinho; (yellow card) 45' Barreal; (yellow card) 79' Luan Peres	Stadium: Estádio Cícero de Souza Marques; Attendance: 7,780; Referee: Edina Alves Batista

18 November 35	Coritiba	v	Santos	Curitiba
19:30 UTC-03:00		Report		Stadium: Couto Pereira

23 November 36	Santos	v	Grêmio	Santos
21:00 UTC-03:00		Report		Stadium: Vila Belmiro

29 November 37	Vitória	v	Santos	Salvador
UTC-03:00		Report		Stadium: Barradão

2 December 38	Santos	v	Botafogo	Santos
UTC-03:00		Report		Stadium: Vila Belmiro

=== Copa do Brasil ===
==== Fifth round ====
22 April First leg	Santos	0–0	Coritiba	Santos
19:30 UTC-03:00	Neymar (yellow card) 55'; Luan Peres (yellow card) 90+1'	Report	(yellow card) 50' Tiago Cóser; (yellow card) 79' Wallisson; (yellow card) 87' Vini Paulista	Stadium: Vila Belmiro; Attendance: 7,182; Referee: Bruno Arleu de Araújo

13 May Second leg	Coritiba	0–2 (0–2 agg.)	Santos	Curitiba
19:30 UTC-03:00	Tiago Cóser (yellow card) 60'	Report	20' Bontempo; 28', (yellow card) 36' Frías; (yellow card) 48' Escobar; (yellow card) 72' Oliva; (yellow card) 88' Gabriel; (yellow card) 90+4' Gabriel Menino	Stadium: Couto Pereira; Attendance: 36,100; Referee: Ramon Abatti Abel

==== Round of 16 ====
1 August First leg	Santos	0–0	Remo	Santos
21:00 UTC-03:00	Rollheiser (yellow card) 19'; Escobar (yellow card) 53'; Neymar (yellow card) 90+4'	Report	(yellow card) 40' Zé Ricardo; (yellow card) 45+3' Matheus Felipe; (yellow card) 74' Alef Manga; (yellow card) 88' Edson Fernando	Stadium: Vila Belmiro; Attendance: 12,820; Referee: Bruno Arleu de Araújo

4 August Second leg	Remo	0–1 (0–1 agg.)	Santos	Belém
21:30 UTC-03:00	Marllon (red card) 28'; Picco (yellow card) 45+6'	Report	(yellow card) 22' Gabriel; (yellow card) 23' João Schmidt; 74' Rony; (yellow card) 83' Oliva; (yellow card) 90' Gabriel Menino; (yellow card) 90+3' Barreal	Stadium: Mangueirão; Attendance: 43,658; Referee: Anderson Daronco

==== Quarter-finals ====
26 August First leg	Palmeiras	3–0	Santos	São Paulo
21:30 UTC-03:00	José López 34', 61'; Andreas Pereira 45', (yellow card) 77'; Barboza (yellow card) 90+1'	Report	(yellow card) 21' Caballero; (yellow card) 79' Rony	Stadium: Nubank Parque; Attendance: 40,698; Referee: Bruno Arleu de Araújo

2 September Second leg	Santos	0–0 (0–3 agg.)	Palmeiras	Santos
21:30 UTC-03:00	Escobar (yellow card) 2'; Bontempo (yellow card) 34'; Rafael Gonzaga (yellow card) 64'; Gabriel (yellow card) 86'	Report	(yellow card) 2' Felipe Anderson; (yellow card) 40' Giay; (yellow card) 64' Vitor Roque; (yellow card) 89' Luis Pacheco	Stadium: Vila Belmiro; Attendance: 15,077; Referee: Davi de Oliveira Lacerda

== See also ==
- 2026 Santos FC (women) season
