= Mateus Xavier =

Brazilian footballer (born 2007)

- Mateus Xavier with Santos in 2025

Personal information
- Full name: Mateus Xavier de Sousa
- Date of birth: 29 June 2007 (age 19)
- Place of birth: Ibicaraí, Brazil
- Height: 1.79 m (5 ft 10 in)
- Position: Winger

Team information
- Current team: Santos
- Number: 47

Youth career
- 2021–: Santos

Senior career*
Years	Team	Apps	(Gls)
2024–	Santos	7	(0)
- * Club domestic league appearances and goals as of 12:32, 4 May 2026 (UTC)

Mateus Xavier de Sousa (born 29 June 2007), known as Mateus Xavier, is a Brazilian footballer who plays mainly as a left winger for Santos.

== Career ==
Mateus Xavier with Santos in 2025

Born in Ibicaraí, Bahia, Mateus Xavier joined Santos' youth setup in 2021, aged 14; he previously had a trial at the club at the age of nine, but was rejected. On 22 September 2023, he signed his first professional contract with the club, after agreeing to a three-year deal.

On 30 June 2024, Mateus Xavier was registered with the first team squad for the 2024 Série B. He made his first team debut the following day, coming on as a second-half substitute for Julio Furch in a 1–0 home win over Chapecoense.

Mateus Xavier made his Série A debut on 27 April 2025, replacing Guilherme in a 2–1 home loss to Red Bull Bragantino. On 24 July, he renewed his contract with the club until December 2028.

In April 2026, Mateus Xavier was definitely promoted to the first team by head coach Cuca.

== Career statistics ==
As of 11 May 2026.

Club	Season	League			State League		Cup		Continental		Other		Total	
Club	Season	Division	Apps	Goals	Apps	Goals	Apps	Goals	Apps	Goals	Apps	Goals	Apps	Goals
Santos	2024	Série B	1	0	—		—		—		—		1	0
Santos	2025	Série A	3	0	0	0	1	0	—		—		4	0
Santos	2026	Série A	1	0	2	0	0	0	2 (Note: Appearance(s) in Copa Sudamericana)	0	—		5	0
Career total			5	0	2	0	1	0	2	0	0	0	10	0

== Honours ==
Santos U17

- Campeonato Paulista Sub-17: 2024

Santos U20

- Campeonato Paulista Sub-20: 2025

Santos

- Campeonato Brasileiro Série B: 2024
