= Rafael Gonzaga =

Brazilian footballer

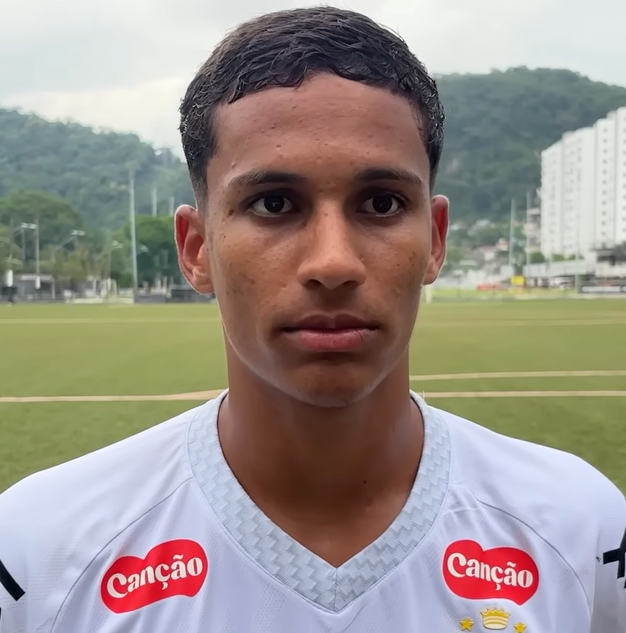
- Gonzaga in 2026

Personal information
- Full name: Rafael de Andrade Gonzaga
- Date of birth: 7 February 2008 (age 18)
- Place of birth: São Sebastião, Brazil
- Height: 1.81 m (5 ft 11 in)
- Position: Left-back

Team information
- Current team: Santos
- Number: 38

Youth career
- 2019–: Santos

Senior career*
Years	Team	Apps	(Gls)
2026–	Santos	4	(0)

International career^{‡}
2023	Brazil U15		
2024	Brazil U16		
2025	Brazil U17	5	(0)
2026–	Brazil U20	1	(0)
- * Club domestic league appearances and goals as of 17:33, 19 November 2026 (UTC) ‡ National team caps and goals as of 21:40, 14 August 2026 (UTC)

Rafael de Andrade Gonzaga (born 7 February 2008) is a Brazilian footballer who plays as a left-back for Santos.

== Club career ==
Born in São Sebastião, São Paulo, Gonzaga joined Santos FC' youth setup in 2019, aged ten. In June 2024, he signed his first professional contract with the club, agreeing to a deal until May 2027.

In March 2026, Gonzaga began training with the first team, after Vinicius Lira suffered a knee injury. He made his senior debut on 8 April, starting in a 1–0 Copa Sudamericana away loss to Deportivo Cuenca.

Gonzaga made his Série A debut on 19 April 2026, coming on as a half-time substitute for Moisés in a 3–2 home loss to Fluminense. On 8 May, he had his link renewed until December 2030.

== International career ==
In 2023, Gonzaga played with the Brazil national under-15 team. In September 2024, he was called up to the under-16s for the year's South American U-16 Championship.

In March 2025, Gonzaga was called up to the under-17 team for the 2025 South American U-17 Championship. He featured in five matches during the competition, as his nation lifted the trophy.

On 28 July 2026, Gonzaga and another two Santos players were called up to the under-20 team for two friendlies against Bolivia.

== Career statistics ==
As of 19 November 2026.

Club	Season	League			State League		Cup		Continental		Other		Total	
Club	Season	Division	Apps	Goals	Apps	Goals	Apps	Goals	Apps	Goals	Apps	Goals	Apps	Goals
Santos	2026	Série A	4	0	0	0	0	0	4 (Note: Appearance(s) in Copa Sudamericana)	0	—		8	0
Career total			4	0	0	0	0	0	4	0	0	0	8	0

== Honours ==
Santos U20

- Campeonato Paulista Sub-20: 2025

Brazil U17

- South American U-17 Championship: 2025
