= Gustavo Henrique (footballer, born 2005) =

Brazilian footballer

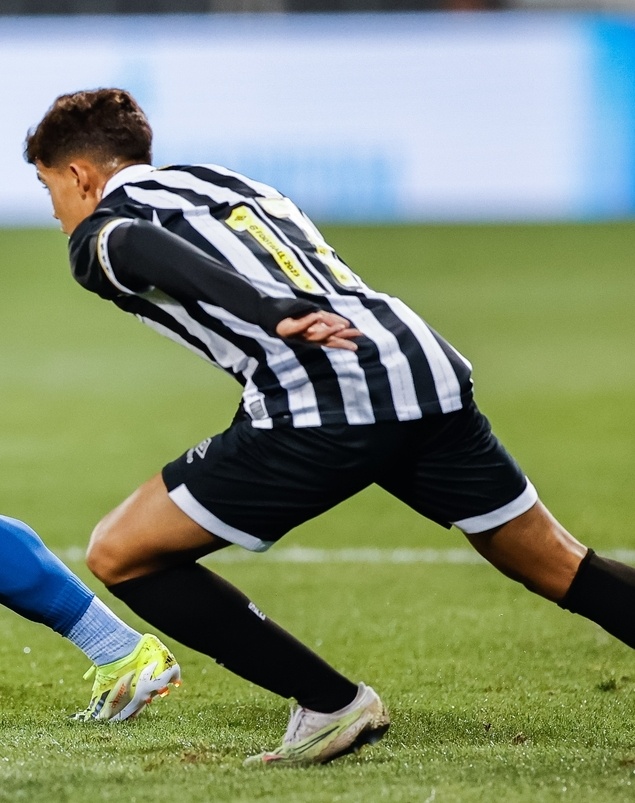
- Gustavo Henrique playing for Santos in 2024

Personal information
- Full name: Gustavo Henrique Pereira
- Date of birth: 7 April 2005 (age 21)
- Place of birth: Limeira, Brazil
- Height: 1.72 m (5 ft 8 in)
- Position: Defensive midfielder

Team information
- Current team: Santos
- Number: 48

Youth career
- 2015: Independente de Limeira
- 2016–2017: Corinthians
- 2017–2026: Santos

Senior career*
Years	Team	Apps	(Gls)
2026–	Santos	24	(0)
- * Club domestic league appearances and goals as of 17:34, 19 November 2026 (UTC)

Gustavo Henrique Pereira (born 7 April 2005), known as Gustavo Henrique or sometimes as Gustavinho, is a Brazilian footballer who plays for Santos. Mainly a defensive midfielder, he can also play as a right-back.

== Career ==
Born in Limeira, São Paulo, Gustavo Henrique joined Santos' youth setup in 2017, after representing Corinthians and Independente de Limeira. On 19 May 2022, he signed his first professional contract with the club, after agreeing to a three-year deal.

On 2 July 2024, Gustavo Henrique renewed his link with Peixe until January 2026. In January of the following year, he was registered for the 2025 Campeonato Paulista.

On 30 July 2025, after establishing himself as a captain for the under-20 team, Gustavo Henrique further extended his contract until 2028. He made his professional debut the following 10 January, coming on as a second-half substitute for João Schmidt in a 2–1 Campeonato Paulista home win over Novorizontino.

On 17 April 2026, after establishing himself as a regular starter, Gustavo Henrique renewed his link until December 2030.

== Career statistics ==
As of 19 November 2026.

Club	Season	League			State League		Cup		Continental		Other		Total	
Club	Season	Division	Apps	Goals	Apps	Goals	Apps	Goals	Apps	Goals	Apps	Goals	Apps	Goals
Santos	2026	Série A	23	0	1	0	3	0	7 (Note: Appearance(s) in Copa Sudamericana)	0	—		34	0
Career total			23	0	1	0	3	0	7	0	0	0	34	0

== Honours ==
Santos U20

- Campeonato Paulista Sub-20: 2025
