= Pedro Assis =

Brazilian footballer

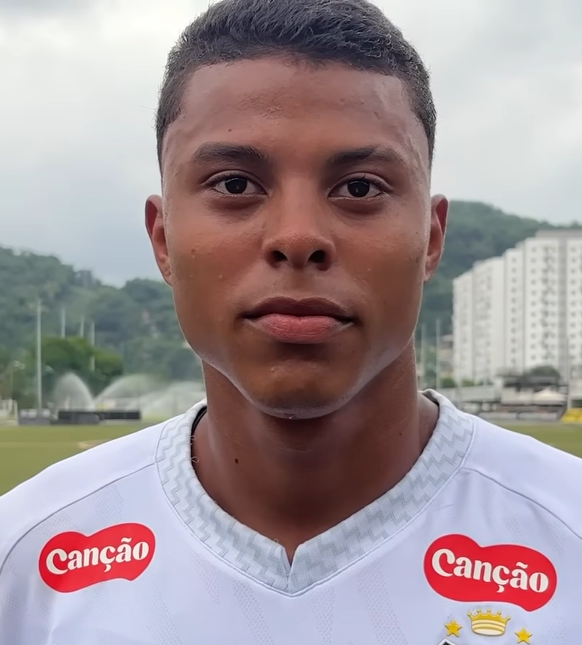
- Pedro Assis in 2026

Personal information
- Full name: Pedro Assis Gonçalves
- Date of birth: 19 February 2007 (age 19)
- Place of birth: Lauro de Freitas, Brazil
- Position: Forward

Team information
- Current team: Santos
- Number: 39

Youth career
- 2018–2023: Bahia
- 2024–2025: Cruzeiro
- 2025–: Santos

Senior career*
Years	Team	Apps	(Gls)
2026–	Santos	0	(0)
- * Club domestic league appearances and goals as of 00:42, 21 August 2026 (UTC)

Pedro Assis Gonçalves (born 19 February 2007), known as Pedro Assis, is a Brazilian footballer who plays as a forward for Santos.

== Career ==
Born in Lauro de Freitas, Bahia, Pedro Assis began his career in a football school in his hometown at the age of seven, before joining Bahia in 2018, aged 11. He signed for Cruzeiro in 2024, but left the club in February of the following year.

In April 2025, Pedro Assis signed a contract with Santos, being initially a member of the under-20 team. He made his professional debut on 20 August 2026, coming on as a late substitute for Gustavo Caballero in a 0–0 away draw against Macará, for the year's Copa Sudamericana.

== Career statistics ==
As of match played 20 August 2026.

Club	Season	League			State League		Cup		Continental		Other		Total	
Club	Season	Division	Apps	Goals	Apps	Goals	Apps	Goals	Apps	Goals	Apps	Goals	Apps	Goals
Santos	2026	Série A	0	0	0	0	0	0	1 (Note: Appearance(s) in Copa Sudamericana)	0	—		1	0
Career total			0	0	0	0	0	0	1	0	0	0	1	0

== Honours ==
Santos U20

- Campeonato Paulista Sub-20: 2025
