= João Alencar =

Brazilian footballer

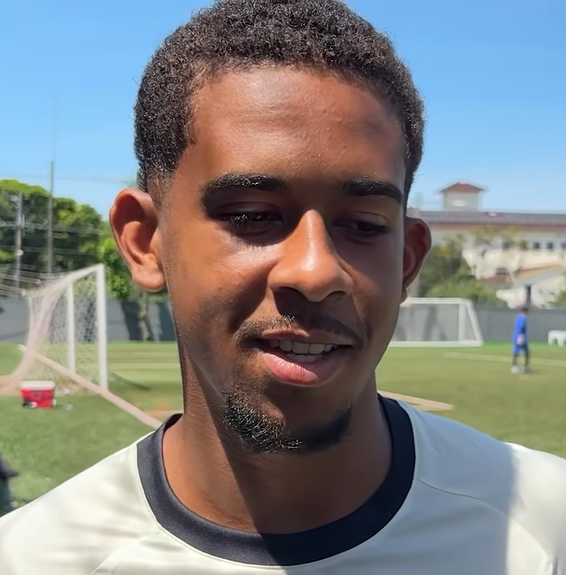
- Alencar in 2026

Personal information
- Full name: João Alencar Santos Paes da Costa
- Date of birth: 25 June 2007 (age 19)
- Place of birth: Belo Horizonte, Brazil
- Height: 1.87 m (6 ft 2 in)
- Position: Centre-back

Team information
- Current team: Santos
- Number: 42

Youth career
- 2017–: Santos

Senior career*
Years	Team	Apps	(Gls)
2026–	Santos	5	(0)
- * Club domestic league appearances and goals as of 17:34, 19 November 2026 (UTC)

João Alencar Santos Paes da Costa (born 25 June 2007) is a Brazilian footballer who plays as a centre-back for Santos.

== Club career ==
Born in Belo Horizonte, Minas Gerais, Alencar joined Santos' youth setup in September 2017, aged ten. On 28 September 2023, he signed his first professional contract with the club, agreeing to a deal until August 2026.

Alencar began to play with the under-20 team in 2024, and made his first team debut with Peixe on 28 May 2025, coming on as a late substitute in a friendly match against RB Leipzig. On 22 September of that year, he further extended his link until June 2030.

In April 2026, Alencar was definitely promoted to the first team by head coach Cuca. On 19 August, he again renewed his contract, now until July 2031.

Alencar made his professional – and Série A – debut on 18 October 2026, coming on as second-half substitute for fellow youth graduate Lucas Veríssimo in a 2–1 away win over Fluminense.

== International career ==
In June 2024, Alencar was called up to the Brazil national under-17 team for a tournament in Portugal, but had to withdraw from the competition due to an injury.

== Career statistics ==
As of 19 November 2026.

Club	Season	League			State League		Cup		Continental		Other		Total	
Club	Season	Division	Apps	Goals	Apps	Goals	Apps	Goals	Apps	Goals	Apps	Goals	Apps	Goals
Santos	2026	Série A	5	0	0	0	0	0	0	0	—		5	0
Career total			5	0	0	0	0	0	0	0	0	0	5	0

== Honours ==
Santos U20

- Campeonato Paulista Sub-20: 2025
