= Pepê Fermino =

Brazilian footballer

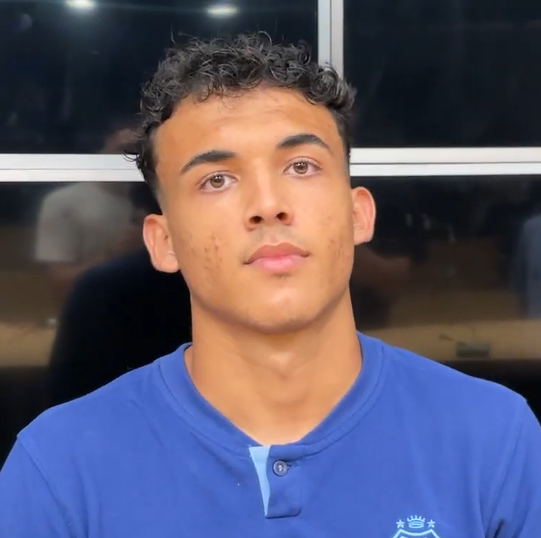
- Pepê Fermino in 2024

Personal information
- Full name: Pedro Paulo Manoel Fermino
- Date of birth: 12 February 2007 (age 19)
- Place of birth: Balneário Camboriú, Brazil
- Height: 1.74 m (5 ft 9 in)
- Position: Midfielder

Team information
- Current team: Santos
- Number: 20

Youth career
- 2015–2017: Flamengo
- 2018–: Santos

Senior career*
Years	Team	Apps	(Gls)
2026–	Santos	0	(0)

International career
2022	Brazil U16	3	(0)
- * Club domestic league appearances and goals as of 00:47, 6 August 2026 (UTC)

Pedro Paulo Manoel Fermino (born 12 February 2007), known as Pepê Fermino, is a Brazilian footballer who plays as a midfielder for Santos.

== Club career ==
Born in Balneário Camboriú, Santa Catarina, Pepê Fermino began playing at the age of six in a local school, and joined Flamengo's youth sides after impressing in a futsal tournament. After three years at the latter club, he moved to Santos at the age of 11, in 2018.

On 24 May 2023, Pepê Fermino signed his first professional contract with Peixe, agreeing to a three-year deal. On 5 August 2025, after establishing himself in the under-20 squad, he further extended his link until June 2030.

Pepê Fermino made his unofficial debut for Santos' first team on 5 July 2026, coming on as a substitute in a 3–0 friendly win over União São João but being himself replaced due to an injury.

== International career ==
In 2022, Pepê Fermino was called up to the Brazil national under-16 team for the UEFA Under-16 Development Tournament. He played in all three matches of the competition, as his side finished third.

== Career statistics ==
As of 11 January 2026.

Club	Season	League			State League		Cup		Continental		Other		Total	
Club	Season	Division	Apps	Goals	Apps	Goals	Apps	Goals	Apps	Goals	Apps	Goals	Apps	Goals
Santos	2026	Série A	0	0	0	0	0	0	0	0	—		0	0
Career total			0	0	0	0	0	0	0	0	0	0	0	0

== Honours ==
Santos U20

- Campeonato Paulista Sub-20: 2025
