= Davi Fernandes =

Brazilian footballer

Personal information
- Full name: Davi Fernandes Cavalcante Ribeiro
- Date of birth: 27 July 2008 (age 18)
- Place of birth: Rio de Janeiro, Brazil
- Height: 1.73 m (5 ft 8 in)
- Positions: Right-back; winger

Team information
- Current team: Santos
- Number: 27

Youth career
- Shalom Atletas
- 2020–2024: Boavista
- 2024–: Santos

Senior career*
Years	Team	Apps	(Gls)
2026–	Santos	4	(0)
- * Club domestic league appearances and goals as of 13:28, 8 September 2026 (UTC)

Davi Fernandes Cavalcante Ribeiro (born 27 July 2008), known as Davi Fernandes or Davizinho, is a Brazilian footballer who plays as either a right-back or a right winger for Santos.

== Career ==
Davizinho began his career with Boavista, and moved to Santos in September 2024. On 10 May 2026, after taking part of some trainings with the first team, he signed his first professional contract with the club, until January 2029.

Davizinho made his professional – and Série A – debut on 23 May 2026, coming on as a late substitute for Igor Vinícius in a 3–2 away loss to Grêmio. On 21 August, he renewed his link until July 2031.

== Career statistics ==
As of 8 September 2026.

Club	Season	League			State League		Cup		Continental		Other		Total	
Club	Season	Division	Apps	Goals	Apps	Goals	Apps	Goals	Apps	Goals	Apps	Goals	Apps	Goals
Santos	2026	Série A	4	0	0	0	2	0	2 (Note: Appearance(s) in Copa Sudamericana)	0	—		8	0
Career total			4	0	0	0	2	0	2	0	0	0	8	0
