= Rodrigo Falcão =

Brazilian footballer

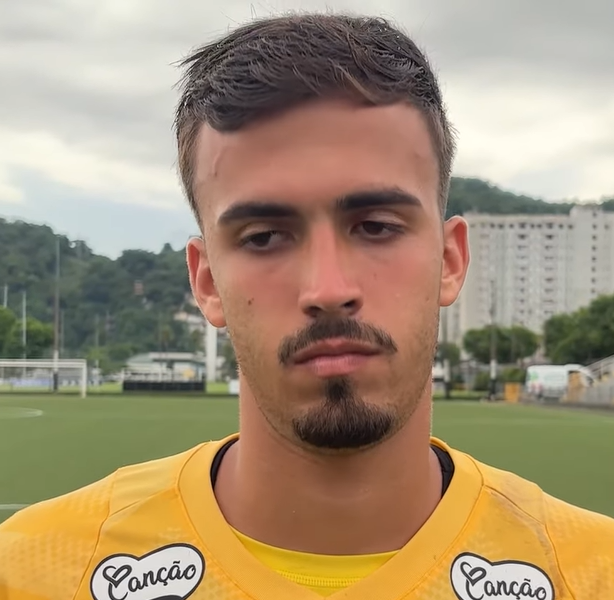
- Falcão in 2025

Personal information
- Full name: Rodrigo Plazezwski Falcão
- Date of birth: 23 March 2005 (age 21)
- Place of birth: Santos, Brazil
- Height: 1.91 m (6 ft 3 in)
- Position: Goalkeeper

Team information
- Current team: Santos
- Number: 67

Youth career
- 2011–2013: Gremetal
- 2013–2026: Santos

Senior career*
Years	Team	Apps	(Gls)
2026–	Santos	0	(0)
- * Club domestic league appearances and goals as of 19:50, 29 April 2026 (UTC)

Rodrigo Plazezwski Falcão (born 23 March 2005), known as Rodrigo Falcão or just Falcão, is a Brazilian footballer who plays as a goalkeeper for Santos.

== Career ==
Born in Santos, São Paulo, Falcão joined Santos' youth setup at the age of eight, from Gremetal; initially a member of the futsal team, he later moved to their football categories. In September 2020, aged 15, he was promoted to the club's under-17 team.

On 25 November 2021, Falcão signed his first professional contract with Peixe, after agreeing to a three-year deal. In January 2024, he was promoted to the first team for trainings, and was an unused substitute in some matches of the 2024 Campeonato Paulista before suffering a knee injury in February.

On 26 July 2024, Falcão further extended his link with Santos until October 2026. He only returned to action in March 2025 with the under-20 side, and helped them to win the Campeonato Paulista Sub-20 after saving penalties in the shootouts in the semi-final and the final.

On 9 March 2026, Falcão renewed his contract with Peixe until January 2029.

== Career statistics ==
As of 1 January 2026.

Club	Season	League			State League		Cup		Continental		Other		Total	
Club	Season	Division	Apps	Goals	Apps	Goals	Apps	Goals	Apps	Goals	Apps	Goals	Apps	Goals
Santos	2026	Série A	0	0	0	0	0	0	0	0	—		0	0
Career total			0	0	0	0	0	0	0	0	0	0	0	0

== Honours ==
Santos U20

- Campeonato Paulista Sub-20: 2025
