= João Ananias (footballer, born 2007) =

Brazilian footballer

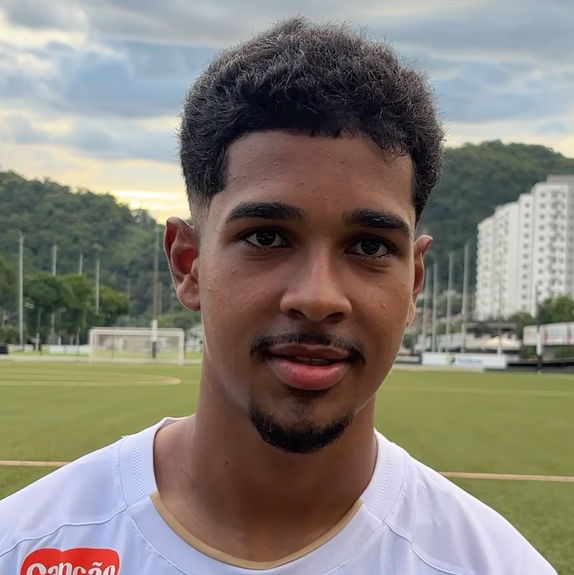
- Ananias in 2026

Personal information
- Full name: João Paulo Ananias Bento
- Date of birth: 12 February 2007 (age 19)
- Place of birth: São Paulo, Brazil
- Height: 1.88 m (6 ft 2 in)
- Position: Centre-back

Team information
- Current team: Santos
- Number: 26

Youth career
- 2018–2026: Santos

Senior career*
Years	Team	Apps	(Gls)
2026–	Santos	6	(0)

International career^{‡}
2026–	Brazil U20	5	(1)
- * Club domestic league appearances and goals as of 19:34, 18 August 2026 (UTC) ‡ National team caps and goals as of 17:19, 19 November 2026 (UTC)

João Paulo Ananias Bento (born 12 February 2007) is a Brazilian footballer who plays as a centre-back for Santos.

== Career ==
Born in São Mateus, a district of São Paulo, but raised in Mauá, Ananias joined Santos' youth setup in 2018, aged ten. On 28 September 2023, he signed his first professional contract with the club, agreeing to a deal until August 2026.

Ananias began to play with the under-20 team in 2024, and further extended his link until June 2030 on 15 August 2025. On 16 November, he scored twice in the second leg of the 2025 Campeonato Paulista Sub-20 finals, to help the club to lift the trophy on penalties.

In April 2026, Ananias was definitely promoted to the first team by head coach Cuca. He made his professional – and Série A – debut on the 25th of that month, starting in a 2–2 away draw against Bahia.

== International career ==
On 13 March 2026, Ananias and other two Santos teammates were called up to the Brazil national under-20 team for two friendlies against Paraguay. He was a start in both matches, both 3–1 wins.

== Career statistics ==
As of 21 September 2026.

Club	Season	League			State League		Cup		Continental		Other		Total	
Club	Season	Division	Apps	Goals	Apps	Goals	Apps	Goals	Apps	Goals	Apps	Goals	Apps	Goals
Santos	2026	Série A	6	0	0	0	2	0	5 (Note: Appearance(s) in Copa Sudamericana)	0	—		13	0
Career total			6	0	0	0	2	0	5	0	0	0	13	0

== Honours ==
Santos U20

- Campeonato Paulista Sub-20: 2025
