= Nadson (footballer, born 2009) =

Brazilian footballer

- Nadson in 2026

Personal information
- Full name: Nadson Juan Maia da Silva de Souza
- Date of birth: 24 January 2009 (age 17)
- Place of birth: Luís Eduardo Magalhães, Brazil
- Height: 1.65 m (5 ft 5 in)
- Position: Winger

Team information
- Current team: Santos
- Number: 57

Youth career
- 2018–: Santos

Senior career*
| Years | Team | Apps | (Gls) |
| 2026– | Santos | 2 | (0) |

International career
| 2023 | Brazil U15 | 3 | (2) |
- * Club domestic league appearances and goals as of 12:56, 17 July 2026 (UTC)

Nadson Juan Maia da Silva de Souza (born 24 January 2009), known as Nadson Juan or just Nadson, is a Brazilian footballer who plays mainly as a right winger for Santos.

== Career ==
Born in Luís Eduardo Magalhães, Bahia, Nadson joined Santos' youth sides in 2018, after the club beat off competition from Palmeiras. He signed a youth contract with the club on 9 February 2023, and was highly regarded at the club after impressing with the under-15 side.

After making his debut with the under-20s at the age of 15 in the 2025 Copa São Paulo de Futebol Júnior, Nadson signed his first professional contract with Peixe on 4 February 2025, shortly after his 16th birthday, agreeing to a three-year deal. He made his first team debut on 8 February, coming on as a late substitute for fellow youth graduate Miguel Terceros in a 2–1 Campeonato Paulista away win over Noroeste.

== International career ==
On 13 June 2023, Nadson and other three Santos teammates were called up to the Brazil national under-15 team. In August 2026, he received his first call-up to the under-17 team.

== Career statistics ==
As of 17 July 2026.

| Club | Season | League | | | State League | | Cup | | Continental | | Other | | Total | |
| Club | Season | Division | Apps | Goals | Apps | Goals | Apps | Goals | Apps | Goals | Apps | Goals | Apps | Goals |
|---|---|---|---|---|---|---|---|---|---|---|---|---|---|---|
| Santos | 2026 | Série A | 1 | 0 | 1 | 0 | 0 | 0 | 0 | 0 | — | | 2 | 0 |
| Career total | | | 1 | 0 | 1 | 0 | 0 | 0 | 0 | 0 | 0 | 0 | 2 | 0 |

== Honours ==
Santos U17

- Campeonato Paulista Sub-17: 2024

Santos U20

- Campeonato Paulista Sub-20: 2025
