= Bernardo (footballer, born May 2005) =

Brazilian footballer

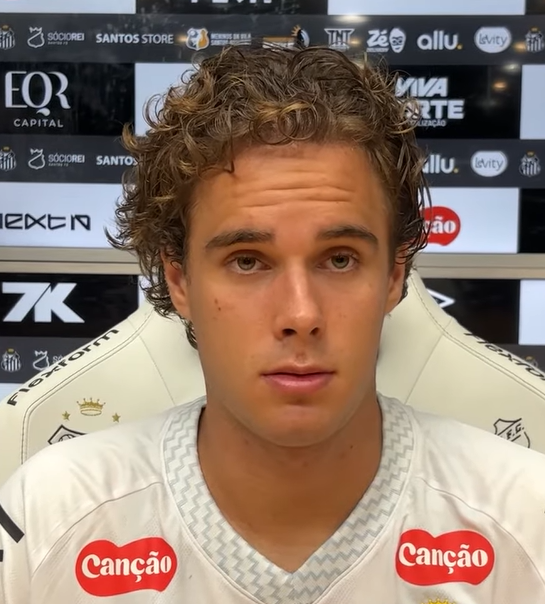
- Bernardo in 2025

Personal information
- Full name: Bernardo Paias Ferreira
- Date of birth: 10 May 2005 (age 21)
- Place of birth: Ribeirão Preto, Brazil
- Height: 1.80 m (5 ft 11 in)
- Position: Attacking midfielder

Team information
- Current team: Amazonas (on loan from Santos)

Youth career
- 2014–2019: Santos
- 2020: São Paulo
- 2021–2026: Santos

Senior career*
Years	Team	Apps	(Gls)
2026–	Santos	0	(0)
2026–	→ Amazonas (loan)	2	(0)
- * Club domestic league appearances and goals as of 19:09, 9 April 2026 (UTC)

Bernardo Paias Ferreira (born 10 May 2005), simply known as Bernardo, is a Brazilian footballer who plays as an attacking midfielder for Amazonas, on loan from Santos.

== Career ==
=== Santos ===
Born in Ribeirão Preto, São Paulo, Bernardo joined Santos' youth setup at the age of nine. He left the club in 2019, spending one year at São Paulo before returning in 2021, and renewed his contract with Peixe on 5 December 2023.

A spotlight of the under-20 team, Bernardo was unable to string together a series of matches in the category in the 2024 and 2025 seasons, after struggling with injuries. He still scored one of Santos' goals in the second leg of the 2025 Campeonato Paulista Sub-20 finals, as his side won on penalties.

On 3 February 2026, Bernardo renewed his link with Santos until December 2027.

==== Loan to Amazonas ====
On 21 February 2026, Bernardo was announced on loan at Série C side Amazonas until the end of the season. He made his senior debut on 1 March, coming on as a second-half substitute in a 0–0 Campeonato Amazonense away draw against Parintins.

Bernardo scored his first senior goal on 29 April 2026, netting the opener in a 2–2 Copa Norte away draw against Monte Roraima.

== Career statistics ==
As of 4 May 2026.

Club	Season	League			State League		Cup		Continental		Other		Total	
Club	Season	Division	Apps	Goals	Apps	Goals	Apps	Goals	Apps	Goals	Apps	Goals	Apps	Goals
Santos	2026	Série A	0	0	0	0	0	0	0	0	—		0	0
Amazonas (loan)	2026	Série C	0	0	2	0	0	0	—		3 (Note: Appearance(s) in Copa Norte)	1	5	1
Career total			0	0	2	0	0	0	0	0	3	1	5	1

== Honours ==
Santos U20

- Campeonato Paulista Sub-20: 2025
