= Fernando Pradella =

Brazilian footballer

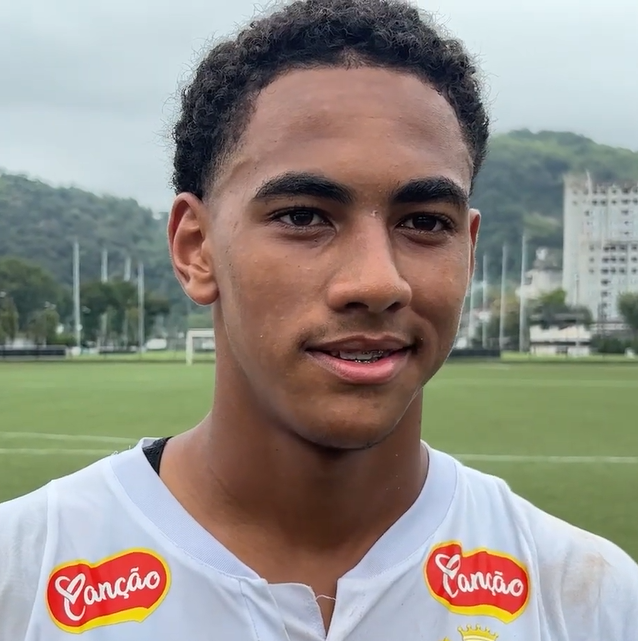
- Pradella in 2024

Personal information
- Full name: Fernando Pradella Rocha
- Date of birth: 3 July 2008 (age 18)
- Place of birth: Osasco, Brazil
- Height: 1.86 m (6 ft 1 in)
- Position: Forward

Team information
- Current team: Santos
- Number: 55

Youth career
- Corinthians
- São Paulo
- Audax
- 2020–2021: Desportivo Brasil
- 2022–: Santos

Senior career*
Years	Team	Apps	(Gls)
2026–	Santos	1	(0)

International career
2023	Brazil U15	3	(2)
- * Club domestic league appearances and goals as of 04:40, 29 January 2026 (UTC)

Fernando Pradella Rocha (born 3 July 2008) is a Brazilian footballer who plays as a forward for Santos.

== Club career ==
Born in Osasco, São Paulo, Pradella began his career with the youth schools of São Paulo FC before playing for futsal sides Company Futsal Osasco and K9 Pro in his hometown, Barueri Futsal and Corinthians, where he transitioned to the fields. He later returned to São Paulo, and subsequently spent a period at Audax, Desportivo Brasil and Referência (only training) before joining Santos' youth categories in April 2022.

On 25 February 2025, Praddella signed his first professional contract with Peixe, agreeing to a deal until August 2027. In June, Borussia Dortmund reportedly made a € 4 million offer for him, but the deal later collapsed.

Pradella made his professional – and Série A – debut on 28 January 2026, coming on as a late substitute for Lautaro Díaz in a 4–2 away loss to Chapecoense.

== International career ==
On 13 June 2023, Pradella and other three Santos teammates were called up to the Brazil national under-15 team.

== Career statistics ==
As of 29 January 2026.

Club	Season	League			State League		Cup		Continental		Other		Total	
Club	Season	Division	Apps	Goals	Apps	Goals	Apps	Goals	Apps	Goals	Apps	Goals	Apps	Goals
Santos	2026	Série A	1	0	0	0	0	0	0	0	—		1	0
Career total			1	0	0	0	0	0	0	0	0	0	1	0

== Honours ==
Santos U17

- Campeonato Paulista Sub-17: 2024

Santos U20

- Campeonato Paulista Sub-20: 2025
