= Rafael Freitas =

Brazilian footballer

Personal information
- Full name: Rafael da Silva Freitas
- Date of birth: 18 August 2005 (age 21)
- Place of birth: Casa Branca, Brazil
- Height: 1.76 m (5 ft 9 in)
- Position: Forward

Team information
- Current team: Guarani
- Number: 45

Youth career
- Guará
- 2021–: Guarani
- 2024–2026: → Santos (loan)

Senior career*
Years	Team	Apps	(Gls)
2022–	Guarani	17	(0)
2024–2026	→ Santos (loan)	0	(0)
- * Club domestic league appearances and goals as of 10 November 2026

Rafael da Silva Freitas (born 18 August 2005), known as Rafael Freitas or just Rafael, is a Brazilian footballer who plays as a forward for Guarani.

== Career ==
Born in Casa Branca, São Paulo, Rafael joined Guarani's youth sides in 2021, after playing for a project from the club in Morungaba and SR Guará FC in his hometown. On 15 June 2022, he signed his first professional contract with Bugre.

Rafael made his first team debut on 6 November 2022, coming on as a second-half substitute for Bruno José in a 1–0 Série B home win over Chapecoense. He alternated between the under-20 and the first team squads during the 2023 season, and returned to the under-20s for the 2024 Copa São Paulo de Futebol Júnior.

On 19 August 2024, Rafael was loaned to Santos for one year, being initially assigned to the under-20 team. In April of the following year, after being an unused substitute in some matches with the main squad, he suffered a knee injury and was sidelined for the remainder of the season.

On 5 March 2026, after fully recovering, Rafael's loan was cut short and he returned to Guarani.

== Career statistics ==
As of 22 August 2024

Club	Season	League			State League		Cup		Continental		Other		Total	
Club	Season	Division	Apps	Goals	Apps	Goals	Apps	Goals	Apps	Goals	Apps	Goals	Apps	Goals
Guarani	2022	Série B	1	0	—		—		—		—		1	0
Guarani	2023	Série B	0	0	8	0	—		—		—		8	0
Guarani	2024	Série B	6	0	0	0	—		—		—		6	0
Guarani	2026	Série C	0	0	—		—		—		—		0	0
Guarani	Total		7	0	8	0	—		—		—		15	0
Santos (loan)	2025	Série A	0	0	0	0	0	0	—		—		0	0
Santos (loan)	2026	Série A	—		0	0	—		—		—		0	0
Santos (loan)	Total		0	0	0	0	0	0	—		—		0	0
Career total			7	0	8	0	0	0	0	0	0	0	15	0
