= Samuel Pierri =

Brazilian footballer

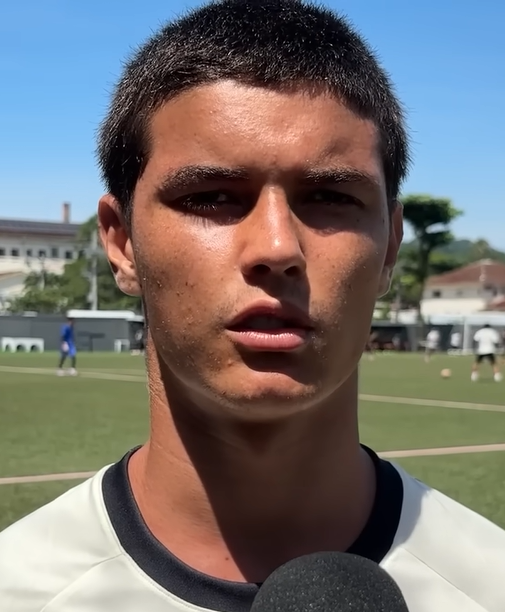
- Samuel Pierri in 2026

Personal information
- Full name: Samuel Pierri Mendes e Silva
- Date of birth: 30 January 2008 (age 18)
- Place of birth: São Bento do Sapucaí, Brazil
- Height: 1.82 m (6 ft 0 in)
- Position: Midfielder

Team information
- Current team: Santos
- Number: 81

Youth career
- 2018–: Santos

Senior career*
Years	Team	Apps	(Gls)
2026–	Santos	2	(0)
- * Club domestic league appearances and goals as of 22:20, 31 May 2026 (UTC)

Samuel Pierri Mendes e Silva (born 30 January 2008), known as Samuel Pierri, is a Brazilian footballer who plays as a midfielder for Santos.

== Career ==
Born in São Bento do Sapucaí, São Paulo, Samuel Pierri joined Santos' youth categories in 2018, aged nine. In June 2024, he signed his first professional contract with the club, agreeing to a three-year deal.

On 22 April 2026, Samuel Pierri was promoted to the first team by head coach Cuca. He made his senior debut on 20 May, coming on as a second-half substitute for Gabriel Bontempo in a 2–2 home draw against San Lorenzo, for the year's Copa Sudamericana.

On 8 June 2026, Samuel Pierri renewed his link with Peixe until 2029. On 10 August, he further extended his link until July 2031.

== Career statistics ==
As of 21 August 2026.

Club	Season	League			State League		Cup		Continental		Other		Total	
Club	Season	Division	Apps	Goals	Apps	Goals	Apps	Goals	Apps	Goals	Apps	Goals	Apps	Goals
Santos	2026	Série A	2	0	—		1	0	4 (Note: Appearance(s) in Copa Sudamericana)	0	—		7	0
Career total			2	0	0	0	1	0	4	0	0	0	7	0

== Honours ==
Santos U20

- Campeonato Paulista Sub-20: 2025
