= Gastón Liendo =

Argentine footballer

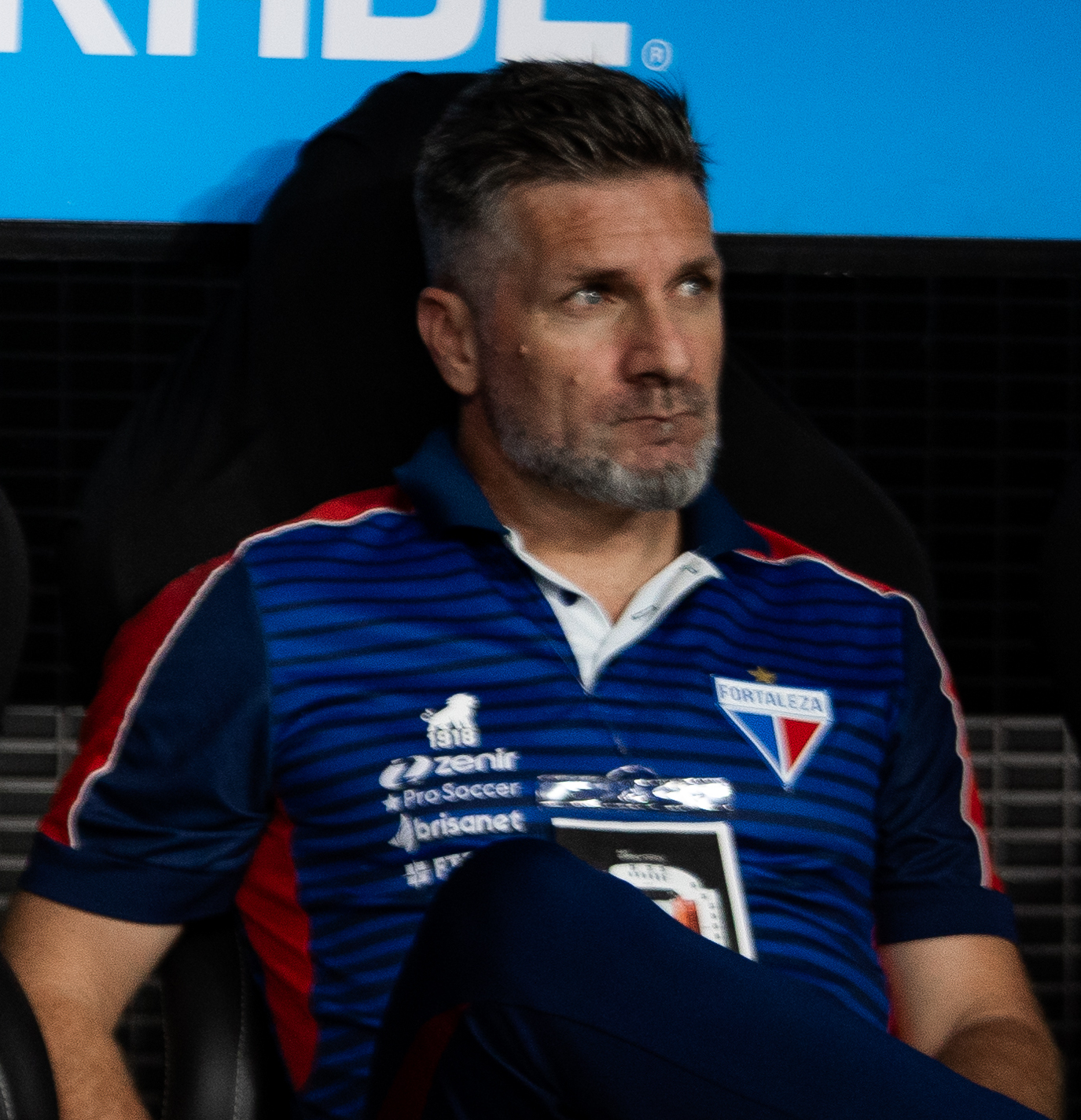
- Liendo as an assistant coach of Fortaleza in 2023

Personal information
- Full name: Gastón Ricardo Liendo
- Date of birth: 29 May 1974 (age 52)
- Place of birth: Rosario, Argentina
- Height: 1.77 m (5 ft 10 in)
- Position: Midfielder

Youth career
- Newell's Old Boys

Senior career*
Years	Team	Apps	(Gls)
1995–1999	Newell's Old Boys	78	(8)
1999–2000	Racing Club	19	(2)
2000–2001	Belgrano	17	(7)
2001–2002	Argentinos Juniors	23	(4)
2002–2003	Newell's Old Boys	23	(2)
2003–2004	Venezia	18	(1)
2004–2005	Mantova	6	(0)
2006–2007	Belgrano	6	(0)
2007	Aldosivi	7	(1)
2007–2009	Central Córdoba de Rosario	36	(0)
Total		233	(25)

Managerial career
- 2010–2017: Newell's Old Boys (youth)
- 2014: Newell's Old Boys (assistant)
- 2017–2018: Defensa y Justicia (assistant)
- 2018–2019: Talleres (assistant)
- 2019: Huracán (assistant)
- 2020–2021: Unión La Calera (assistant)
- 2021–2025: Fortaleza (assistant)
- 2025–2026: Santos (assistant)
- * Club domestic league appearances and goals

Gastón Ricardo Liendo (born 29 May 1974) is an Argentine football coach and former player who played as a midfielder.

== Playing career ==
Born in Rosario, Liendo was a Newell's Old Boys youth graduate. He made his first team debut on 27 August 1995, coming on as a substitute for Jorge Priotti in a 1–0 home loss to Lanús. He scored his first goal the following 11 June, netting his side's second in a 3–2 away loss to Independiente.

Liendo left for Racing Club in 1999, and subsequently represented Belgrano and Argentinos Juniors before returning to Newell's in 2002. He moved abroad in the following year, joining Italian Serie B side FBC Unione Venezia in the 2003–04 season.

After another full season at Mantova in the Serie C1, Liendo spent six months unemployed before returning to Belgrano in January 2006. He helped the club to achieve promotion from Primera B Nacional, but did not feature in the first half of the 2006–07 campaign before leaving for Aldosivi.

Liendo joined Primera B Metropolitana side Central Córdoba de Rosario in 2007, and retired with the side in 2009, aged 35.

== Managerial career ==
After retiring, Liendo returned to his first club Newell's as a manager of the youth categories. He was also an assistant in the main squad in 2014, in the period of Gustavo Raggio's reign.

In October 2017, Liendo joined Juan Pablo Vojvoda's staff at Defensa y Justicia, as his assistant. He followed Vojvoda to Talleres, Huracán, Unión La Calera, Fortaleza and Santos, always under the same role.

== Career statistics ==
Club	Season	League			Cup		Continental		Other		Total	
Club	Season	Division	Apps	Goals	Apps	Goals	Apps	Goals	Apps	Goals	Apps	Goals
Newell's Old Boys	1995–96	Primera División	11	1	—		—		—		11	1
Newell's Old Boys	1996–97	Primera División	26	2	—		—		—		26	2
Newell's Old Boys	1997–98	Primera División	20	2	—		—		—		20	2
Newell's Old Boys	1998–99	Primera División	21	3	—		—		—		21	3
Newell's Old Boys	Subtotal		78	8	—		—		—		78	8
Racing Club	1999–2000	Primera División	19	2	—		5 (Note: Appearance(s) in Copa Mercosur)	0	—		24	2
Belgrano	2000–01	Primera División	17	7	—		—		2 (Note: Appearance(s) in the promotion play-offs)	0	19	7
Argentinos Juniors	2001–02	Primera División	23	4	—		—		—		23	4
Newell's Old Boys	2002–03	Primera División	23	2	—		—		—		23	2
Venezia	2003–04	Serie B	18	1	3	0	—		1 (Note: Appearance(s) in the relegation play-offs)	0	22	1
Mantova	2004–05	Serie C1	6	0	0	0	—		0	0	6	0
Belgrano	2005–06	Primera B Nacional	6	0	—		—		—		6	0
Belgrano	2006–07	Primera División	0	0	—		—		—		0	0
Belgrano	Subtotal		6	0	—		—		—		6	0
Aldosivi	2006–07	Primera B Nacional	7	1	—		—		—		7	1
Career total			197	25	3	0	5	0	3	0	208	25

== Coaching statistics ==
As of 17 March 2026

Coaching record by team and tenure
Team	Nat	From	To	Record								Ref
Team	Nat	From	To	G	W	D	L	GF	GA	GD	Win %	Ref
Fortaleza Esporte Clube (interim) (Note: Coached the club as head coach Juan Pablo Vojvoda was suspended.)	(Brazil)	25 June 2022	25 June 2022	1	0	0	1	2	3	−1	0.00	
Santos (interim)	(Brazil)	15 March 2026	15 March 2026	1	0	1	0	1	1	+0	0.00	
Total				2	0	1	1	3	4	−1	0.00	—
