= Kauã Jesus =

Brazilian footballer

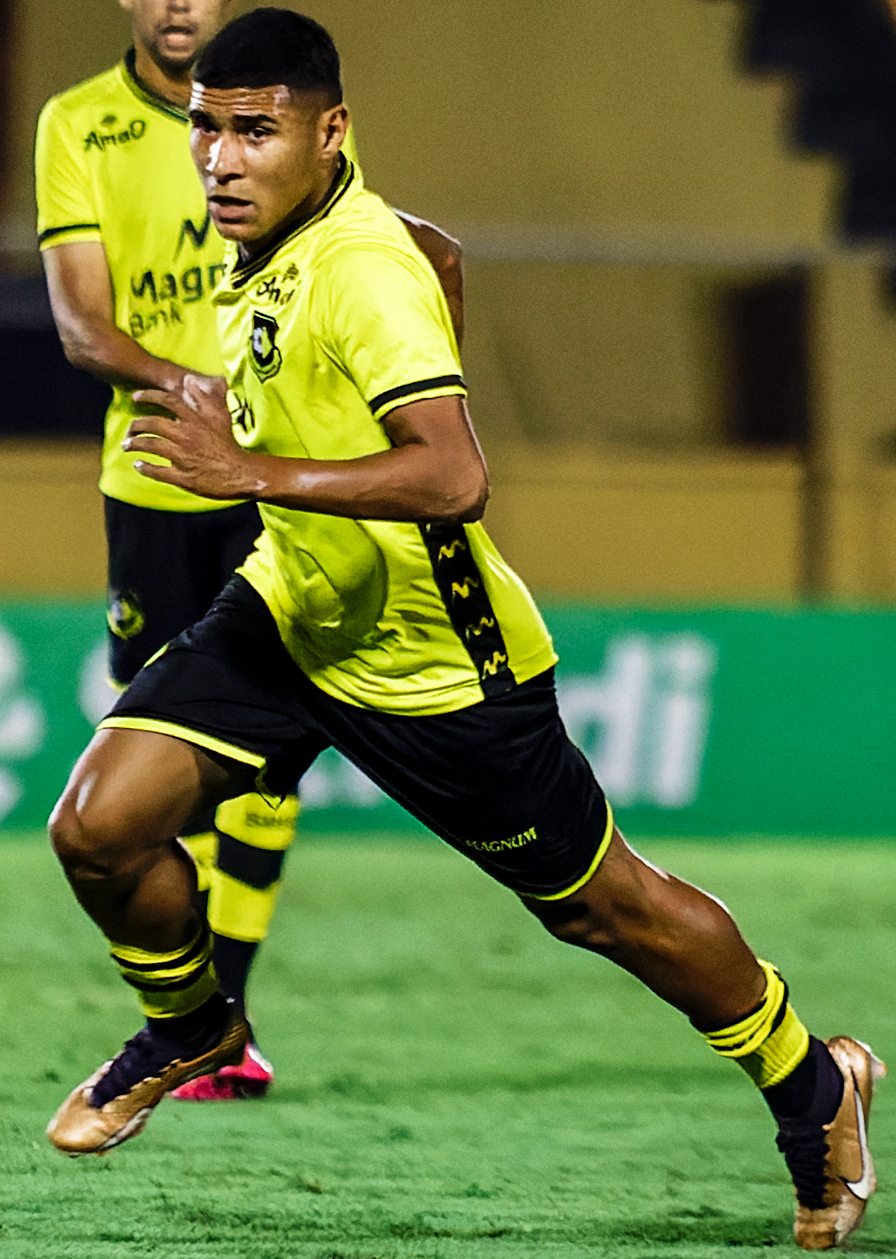
- Kauã Jesus playing for São Bernardo in 2023

Personal information
- Full name: Kauã Jesus Tenório
- Date of birth: 2 September 2003 (age 23)
- Place of birth: São Paulo, Brazil
- Height: 1.70 m (5 ft 7 in)
- Position: Attacking midfielder

Team information
- Current team: Guarani (on loan from São Bernardo)

Youth career
- São Caetano
- 2018–2022: Oeste

Senior career*
Years	Team	Apps	(Gls)
2019–2022	Oeste	83	(7)
2023–	São Bernardo	30	(2)
2025–	→ Guarani (loan)	34	(2)
- * Club domestic league appearances and goals as of 10 November 2026

Kauã Jesus Tenório (born 2 September 2003), known as Kauã Jesus, is a Brazilian footballer who plays as an attacking midfielder for Guarani, on loan from São Bernardo.

== Career ==
=== Oeste ===
Born in São Paulo, Kauã Jesus is a youth product of Oeste, and signed his first professional contract with the club on 4 September 2019. He made his first team debut thirteen days later, coming on as a late substitute for Élvis in a 3–0 Série B home win over Operário Ferroviário; aged 16 years and 11 days, he became the youngest player to appear for the club.

Kauã Jesus scored his first senior goal on 6 March 2021, netting his team's second in a 2–1 Campeonato Paulista Série A2 home win over Audax; he also became the youngest player to score for Oeste. In July, he reached the landmark of 50 first team matches for the club.

=== São Bernardo ===
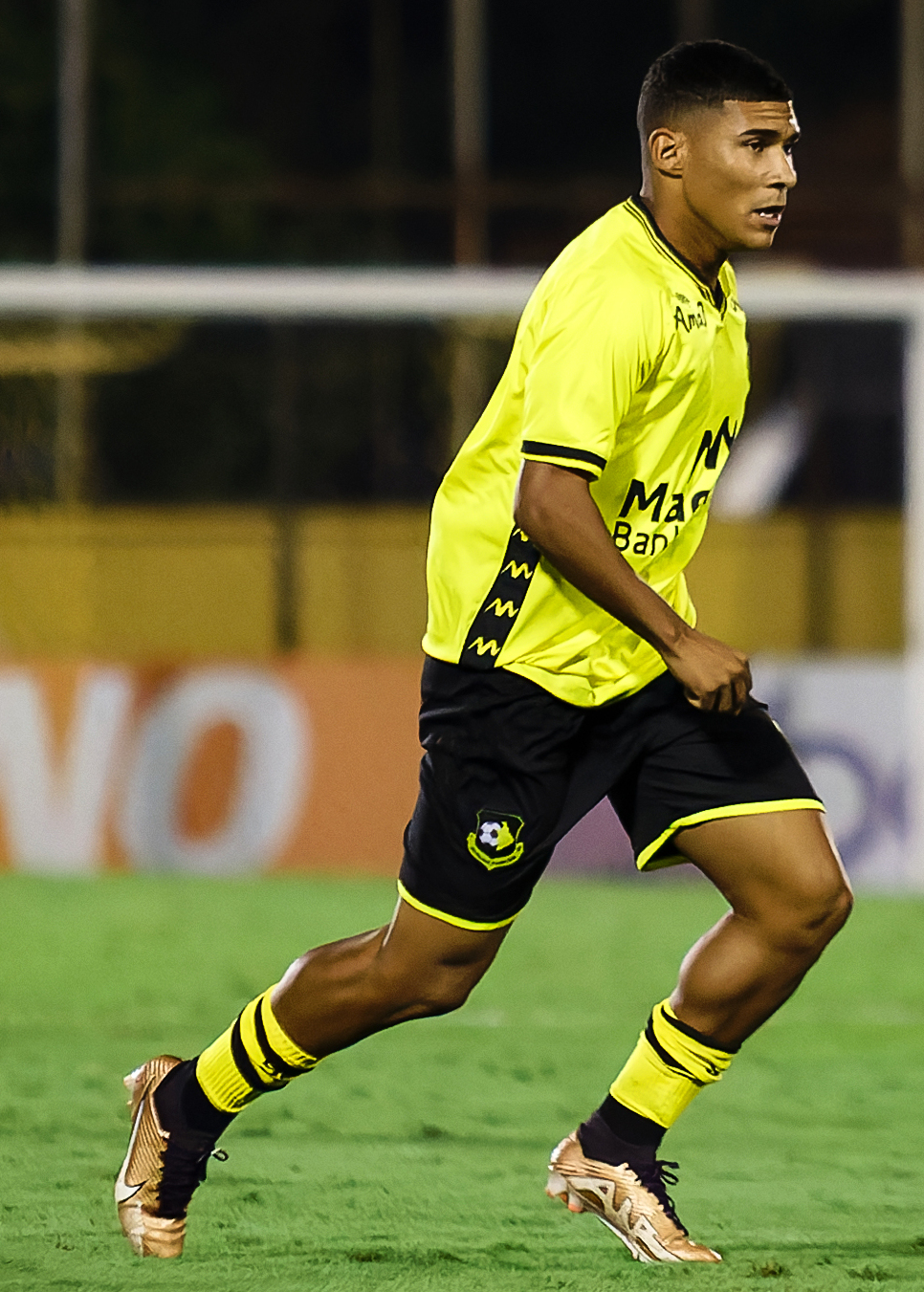
Kauã Jesus in action for São Bernardo in 2023

On 8 December 2022, Kauã Jesus signed a three-year contract with São Bernardo. At his new side, however, he was unable to establish himself as a regular starter.

==== Loan to Guarani ====
On 6 June 2025, Kauã Jesus was announced at fellow Série C side Guarani on loan until the end of the year. On 15 December, his loan was extended for a further season.

== Career statistics ==
As of 21 January 2026

Club	Season	League			State league		Cup		Continental		Other		Total	
Club	Season	Division	Apps	Goals	Apps	Goals	Apps	Goals	Apps	Goals	Apps	Goals	Apps	Goals
Oeste	2019	Série B	1	0	—		—		—		—		1	0
Oeste	2020	Série B	23	0	3	0	—		—		—		26	0
Oeste	2021	Série C	16	0	17	4	—		—		—		33	4
Oeste	2022	Série D	13	3	10	0	1	0	—		6 (Note: Appearance(s) in Copa Paulista)	0	30	3
Oeste	Total		53	3	30	4	1	0	—		6	0	90	7
São Bernardo	2023	Série C	6	0	4	0	1	0	—		—		11	0
São Bernardo	2024	Série C	12	2	5	0	1	0	—		—		18	2
São Bernardo	2025	Série C	3	0	0	0	—		—		—		3	0
São Bernardo	Total		21	2	9	0	2	0	—		—		32	2
Guarani (loan)	2025	Série C	17	1	—		—		—		1	0	18	1
Guarani (loan)	2026	Série C	0	0	1	0	0	0	—		—		1	0
Guarani (loan)	Total		17	1	1	0	0	0	—		1	0	19	1
Career total			91	6	40	4	3	0	0	0	7	0	141	10
