= Kewen (footballer, born 2005) =

Brazilian footballer

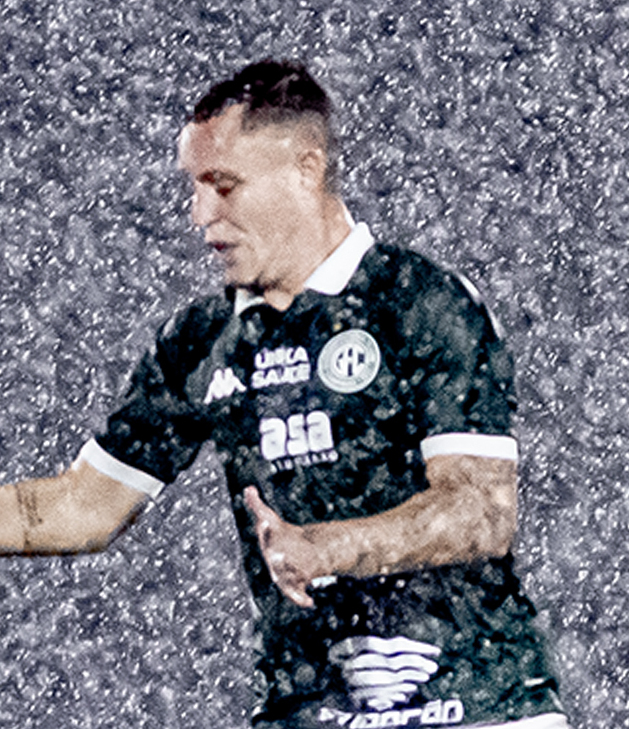
- Kewen playing for Guarani in 2026

Personal information
- Full name: Kewen Andrade Campos
- Date of birth: 7 January 2005 (age 21)
- Place of birth: São Paulo, Brazil
- Height: 1.79 m (5 ft 10 in)
- Position: Forward

Team information
- Current team: Guarani
- Number: 19

Youth career
- 2021–2023: Audax
- 2024–2025: Criciúma
- 2025–2026: Guarani

Senior career*
Years	Team	Apps	(Gls)
2026–	Guarani	11	(1)
- * Club domestic league appearances and goals as of 10 November 2026

Kewen Andrade Campos (born 7 January 2005), simply known as Kewen, is a Brazilian footballer who plays as a forward for Guarani.

== Career ==
Kewen played for the youth sides of Audax and Criciúma, before joining Guarani's under-20 team in 2025. On 18 September of that year, he renewed his contract with the latter club until December 2026, and was promoted to the first team in December.

Kewen made his senior debut on 19 January 2026: after coming on as a late substitute for Nathan Melo, he scored a last-minute equalizer in his first touch to the ball in a 1–1 Campeonato Paulista home draw against Santos.

== Career statistics ==
As of 21 January 2026

Club	Season	League			State League		Cup		Continental		Other		Total	
Club	Season	Division	Apps	Goals	Apps	Goals	Apps	Goals	Apps	Goals	Apps	Goals	Apps	Goals
Guarani	2026	Série C	0	0	1	1	0	0	—		—		1	1
Career total			0	0	1	1	0	0	0	0	0	0	1	1
