= Felipe Laurindo =

Brazilian footballer

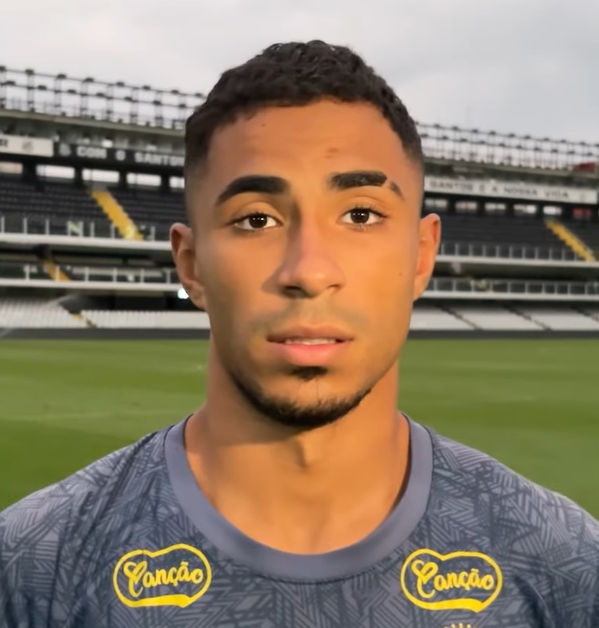
- Laurindo in 2025

Personal information
- Full name: Felipe Freitas Laurindo
- Date of birth: 18 January 2005 (age 21)
- Place of birth: Taboão da Serra, Brazil
- Height: 1.77 m (5 ft 10 in)
- Position: Winger

Team information
- Current team: Cianorte (on loan from Santos)

Youth career
- 2014–2026: Santos

Senior career*
Years	Team	Apps	(Gls)
2026–	Santos	0	(0)
2026–	→ Cianorte (loan)	9	(0)
- * Club domestic league appearances and goals as of 15:39, 19 May 2026 (UTC)

Felipe Freitas Laurindo (born 18 January 2005) is a Brazilian footballer who plays as a winger for Cianorte, on loan from Santos.

== Club career ==
Born in Taboão da Serra, São Paulo, Laurindo joined Santos' youth setup in 2014, aged nine. On 16 April 2021, he signed his first professional contract with the club, but suffered an anterior cruciate ligament injury in the following month.

Back to action in April 2022, Laurindo suffered the same injury shortly after, being sidelined for the remainder of the year. On 5 December 2023, he renewed his link with Peixe for a further three seasons.

In June 2024, Laurindo suffered his third ACL injury, now on his right knee. He returned to action in March 2025, and helped the under-20 team to win the year's Campeonato Paulista Sub-20.

On 23 January 2026, Laurindo was loaned to Cianorte until the end of the season. He made his professional debut the following day, coming on as a half-time substitute in a 0–0 Campeonato Paranaense away draw against Londrina.

== Career statistics ==
As of 19 May 2026.

Club	Season	League			State League		Cup		Continental		Other		Total	
Club	Season	Division	Apps	Goals	Apps	Goals	Apps	Goals	Apps	Goals	Apps	Goals	Apps	Goals
Cianorte	2026	Série D	7	0	2	0	0	0	—		6 (Note: Appearance(s) in Copa Sul-Sudeste)	0	15	0
Career total			7	0	2	0	0	0	0	0	6	0	15	0

== Honours ==
Santos U20

- Campeonato Paulista Sub-20: 2025
