= Pedro Carrerette =

Brazilian footballer

Personal information
- Full name: Pedro Henrique Carrerette Lima
- Date of birth: 30 October 1998 (age 28)
- Place of birth: Bom Jesus do Itabapoana, Brazil
- Height: 1.86 m (6 ft 1 in)
- Position: Centre-back

Team information
- Current team: Paysandu (on loan from Noroeste)
- Number: 44

Youth career
- 2014–2016: Goytacaz
- 2017–2018: Portuguesa-RJ

Senior career*
Years	Team	Apps	(Gls)
2018–2021	Portuguesa-RJ	10	(0)
2020	→ Angra dos Reis (loan)	7	(0)
2021	Novorizontino	1	(0)
2022–2023	Sampaio Corrêa	13	(2)
2023	Botafogo-PB	22	(2)
2024–2025	São Bernardo	18	(0)
2026–	Noroeste	20	(3)
2026–	→ Paysandu (loan)	12	(1)
- * Club domestic league appearances and goals as of 9 November 2026

Pedro Henrique Carrerette Lima (born 30 October 1998) is a Brazilian footballer who plays for Paysandu, on loan from Noroeste. Mainly a centre-back, he can also play as a right-back.

== Career ==
Born in Bom Jesus do Itabapoana, Rio de Janeiro, Carrerette played for Goytacaz and Portuguesa-RJ as a youth, before making his first team debut with the latter in 2018. He served a short loan stint at Angra dos Reis in 2020, before signing for Novorizontino on 27 May 2021.

After just one match for Novorizontino, Carrerette was announced at Sampaio Corrêa on 7 December 2021. On 7 April 2023, after losing space, he moved to Botafogo-PB.

On 7 December 2023, Carrerette signed for São Bernardo for the upcoming season. Initially a starter, he suffered a knee injury the following February, which sidelined him for the remainder of the year.

On 14 November 2025, Carrerette joined Noroeste.

== Career statistics ==
As of 11 February 2026

Club	Season	League			State League		Cup		Continental		Other		Total	
Club	Season	Division	Apps	Goals	Apps	Goals	Apps	Goals	Apps	Goals	Apps	Goals	Apps	Goals
Portuguesa-RJ	2018	Carioca	—		—		—		—		1 (Note: Appearance(s) in Copa Rio)	0	1	0
Portuguesa-RJ	2019	Série D	0	0	0	0	—		—		8	0	8	0
Portuguesa-RJ	2020	Série D	0	0	2	0	—		—		—		2	0
Portuguesa-RJ	2021	Carioca	—		8	0	—		—		—		8	0
Portuguesa-RJ	Total		0	0	10	0	—		—		9	0	19	0
Angra dos Reis (loan)	2020	Carioca Série B1	—		7	0	—		—		—		7	0
Novorizontino	2021	Série C	1	0	—		—		—		—		1	0
Sampaio Corrêa	2022	Série B	5	0	5	1	0	0	—		4 (Note: Appearance(s) in Copa do Nordeste)	1	14	2
Sampaio Corrêa	2023	Série B	—		3	1	0	0	—		3	0	6	1
Sampaio Corrêa	Total		5	0	8	2	0	0	—		7	1	20	3
Botafogo-PB	2023	Série C	22	2	—		—		—		—		22	2
São Bernardo	2024	Série C	0	0	7	0	0	0	—		—		7	0
São Bernardo	2025	Série C	3	0	8	0	—		—		—		11	0
São Bernardo	Total		3	0	15	0	0	0	—		—		18	0
Noroeste	2026	Série D	0	0	7	1	—		—		—		7	1
Career total			31	2	47	3	0	0	0	0	16	1	94	6

== Honours ==
Sampaio Corrêa

- Campeonato Maranhense: 2022
