= Vinicius Lira =

Brazilian footballer (born 2007)

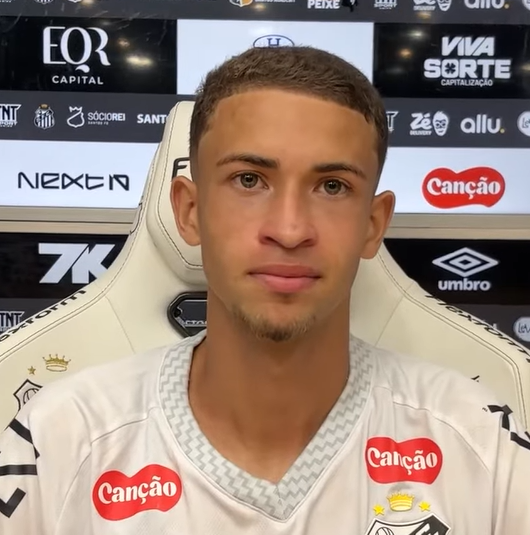
- Lira in 2025

Personal information
- Full name: Vinicius Rodrigues Lira
- Date of birth: 12 October 2007 (age 19)
- Place of birth: São Paulo, Brazil
- Height: 1.87 m (6 ft 2 in)
- Position: Left-back

Team information
- Current team: Santos
- Number: 3

Youth career
- Palmeiras
- 2017–2026: Santos

Senior career*
| Years | Team | Apps | (Gls) |
| 2025– | Santos | 14 | (0) |

International career
| 2024 | Brazil U17 | 3 | (0) |
- * Club domestic league appearances and goals as of 18:59, 17 March 2026 (UTC)

Vinicius Rodrigues Lira (born 12 October 2007), known as Vinicius Lira, is a Brazilian footballer who plays as a left-back for Santos.

== Club career ==
Lira with Santos in 2025

Born in São Paulo, Lira began his career with Palmeiras before moving to Santos in 2017. On 1 May 2024, he signed his first professional contract with the latter club, after agreeing to a three-year deal.

Lira made his first team debut on 29 January 2025, coming on as a half-time substitute for fellow youth graduate Souza in a 3–1 Campeonato Paulista away loss to São Bernardo. He played two further matches before returning to the under-20s, and only became a permanent first team member in January of the following year, after Souza left for Tottenham Hotspur.

In March 2026, Lira suffered a knee injury during a match against Corinthians, being sidelined for the remainder of the season.

== International career ==
In June 2024, Lira was called up to the Brazil national under-17 team. He played for the nation in the Cascais Luso Cup, featuring in all three matches of the competition.

On 13 March 2026, Lira and other two Santos teammates were called up to the under-20 team, but later had to withdraw due to an injury.

== Career statistics ==
As of 17 March 2026.

| Club | Season | League | | | State League | | Cup | | Continental | | Other | | Total | |
| Club | Season | Division | Apps | Goals | Apps | Goals | Apps | Goals | Apps | Goals | Apps | Goals | Apps | Goals |
|---|---|---|---|---|---|---|---|---|---|---|---|---|---|---|
| Santos | 2025 | Série A | 0 | 0 | 3 | 0 | 0 | 0 | — | | — | | 3 | 0 |
| Santos | 2026 | Série A | 5 | 0 | 6 | 0 | 0 | 0 | 0 | 0 | — | | 11 | 0 |
| Career total | | | 5 | 0 | 9 | 0 | 0 | 0 | 0 | 0 | 0 | 0 | 14 | 0 |

== Honours ==
Santos U17

- Campeonato Paulista Sub-17: 2024

Santos U20

- Campeonato Paulista Sub-20: 2025

Brazil U17

- Cascais Luso Cup: 2024
