= 2025 Santos FC season =

Santos
2025 season
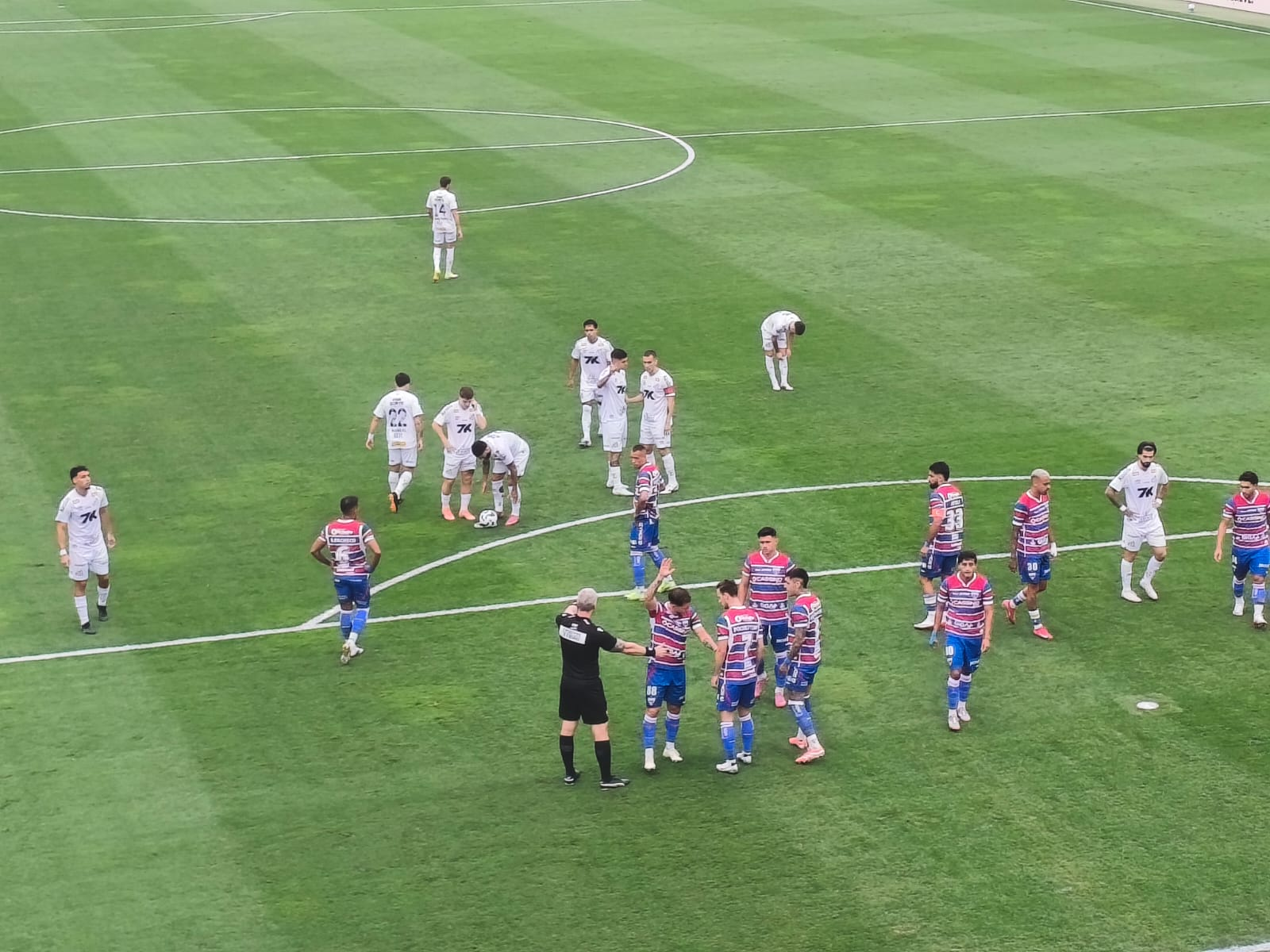
- Santos vs Fortaleza at the Vila Belmiro on 2 November
- President: Marcelo Teixeira
- Head coach: Pedro Caixinha (until 14 April); César Sampaio (caretaker, 14 April – 29 April); Cleber Xavier (from 29 April – until 17 August); Matheus Bachi (caretaker, 17 August – 23 August); Juan Pablo Vojvoda (from 22 August)
- Stadium: Vila Belmiro
- Série A: 12th
- Campeonato Paulista: Semi-final
- Copa do Brasil: Third round
- Top goalscorer: League: Álvaro Barreal (9); All: Guilherme (14)
- Average home league attendance: 17,022
| Home colours | Away colours | Third colours |

The 2025 season was Santos FC's 113th season in existence. This season marks the return of the club to the top flight of Brazilian football after being 2024 Campeonato Brasileiro Série B champion. Santos also competed in the state league, Campeonato Paulista, and in the Copa do Brasil.

== Players ==
=== Squad information ===
As of 7 December 2025

| N | Name | Pos. | Nat. | Place of birth | Date of birth (age) | Caps | Goals | Signed from | Date signed | Fee | Contract End |
Goalkeepers
| 12 | Diógenes | GK | (Brazil) | Itapecerica da Serra (São Paulo (state)) | 6 January 2001 (aged 24) | 2 | 0 | Youth system | 9 July 2021 | Free | 31 December 2026 |
| 45 | João Pedro | GK | (Brazil) | Santos (São Paulo (state)) | 18 March 2008 (aged 17) | 0 | 0 | Youth system | 11 May 2024 | Free | 30 April 2027 |
| 77 | Gabriel Brazão | GK | (Brazil) | Uberlândia (Minas Gerais) | 5 October 2000 (aged 25) | 83 | 0 | Inter Milan (Italy) | 21 February 2024 | Free | 31 December 2026 |
| 82 | João Fernandes | GK | (Brazil) | Rio Verde (Goiás) | 25 May 2004 (aged 21) | – | – | Youth system | 20 February 2025 | Free | 31 December 2026 |
Defenders
| 2 | Mayke | RB | (Brazil) | Carangola (Minas Gerais) | 10 November 1992 (aged 33) | 12 | 0 | Palmeiras | 30 July 2025 | Free | 31 December 2027 |
| 3 | João Basso | CB | (Brazil) | Curitiba (Paraná (state)) | 13 January 1997 (aged 28) | 34 | 3 | Arouca (Portugal) | 1 August 2023 | € 2.5M | 31 December 2026 |
| 14 | Luan Peres | CB/LB | (Brazil) | São Paulo (São Paulo (state)) | 19 July 1994 (aged 31) | 130 | 1 | Fenerbahçe (Turkey) | 2 September 2024 | Free | 31 December 2027 |
| 18 | Igor Vinícius | RB | (Brazil) | Sinop (Mato Grosso) | 1 April 1997 (aged 28) | 20 | 0 | São Paulo | 1 July 2025 | Free | 30 June 2028 |
| 23 | Alexis Duarte | CB | (Paraguay) | Itauguá | 12 March 2000 (aged 25) | 5 | 0 | Spartak Moscow (Russia) | 2 September 2025 | € 3.4M | 30 June 2029 |
| 25 | Luisão | CB | (Brazil) | Taboão da Serra (São Paulo (state)) | 9 September 2003 (aged 22) | 9 | 0 | Novorizontino | 11 January 2025 | R$ 10M | 31 December 2028 |
| 26 | João Ananias | CB | (Brazil) | São Paulo (São Paulo (state)) | 12 February 2007 (aged 18) | 0 | 0 | Youth system | 9 August 2025 | Free | 30 June 2030 |
| 27 | Zé Ivaldo | CB | (Brazil) | Cajueiro (Alagoas) | 21 February 1997 (aged 28) | 35 | 1 | Cruzeiro | 11 January 2025 | Loan | 31 December 2025 |
| 30 | Vinicius Lira | LB | (Brazil) | São Paulo (São Paulo (state)) | 12 October 2007 (aged 18) | 3 | 0 | Youth system | 28 January 2025 | Free | 31 March 2027 |
| 31 | Gonzalo Escobar | LB | (Argentina) | Alejandro Korn | 16 March 1997 (aged 28) | 75 | 1 | Fortaleza | 19 April 2024 | Swap | 31 December 2026 |
| 33 | Souza | LB | (Brazil) | Mauá (São Paulo (state)) | 16 June 2006 (aged 19) | 38 | 1 | Youth system | 6 February 2024 | Free | 31 December 2028 |
| 42 | João Alencar | CB | (Brazil) | Belo Horizonte (Minas Gerais) | 25 June 2007 (aged 18) | 0 | 0 | Youth system | 24 September 2025 | Free | 30 June 2030 |
| 44 | JP Chermont | RB | (Brazil) | Bauru (São Paulo (state)) | 18 January 2006 (aged 19) | 50 | 2 | Youth system | 21 February 2024 | Free | 31 December 2027 |
| 98 | Adonis Frías | CB | (Argentina) | Florencio Varela | 17 March 1998 (aged 27) | 13 | 0 | León (Mexico) | 2 September 2025 | € 3.4M | 31 December 2028 |
Midfielders
| 5 | João Schmidt | DM/CM | (Brazil) | São Paulo (São Paulo (state)) | 19 May 1993 (aged 32) | 94 | 4 | Kawasaki Frontale (Japan) | 30 December 2023 | Free | 31 December 2027 |
| 6 | Zé Rafael | DM/CM | (Brazil) | Ponta Grossa (Paraná (state)) | 16 June 1993 (aged 32) | 28 | 1 | Palmeiras | 26 February 2025 | € 2.5M | 31 December 2027 |
| 8 | Tomás Rincón | DM | (Venezuela) | San Cristóbal | 13 January 1988 (aged 37) | 75 | 2 | Free agent | 15 August 2023 | Free | 31 December 2025 |
| 10 | Neymar | AM/LW | (Brazil) | Mogi das Cruzes | 5 February 1992 (aged 33) | 258 | 149 | Al-Hilal (Saudi Arabia) | 31 January 2025 | Free | 31 December 2025 |
| 15 | Willian Arão | DM/CB | (Brazil) | São Paulo (São Paulo (state)) | 12 March 1992 (aged 33) | 13 | 0 | Panathinaikos (Greece) | 1 July 2025 | Free | 31 December 2026 |
| 16 | Thaciano | AM/SS | (Brazil) | Campina Grande (Paraíba) | 12 May 1995 (aged 30) | 32 | 5 | Bahia | 13 January 2025 | € 4.5M | 31 December 2028 |
| 20 | Hyan | CM | (Brazil) | Brasília (Federal District (Brazil)) | 24 March 2004 (aged 21) | 3 | 0 | Youth system | 21 February 2024 | Free | 31 July 2027 |
| 22 | Álvaro Barreal | LM/LW | (Argentina) | Buenos Aires | 17 August 2000 (aged 25) | 37 | 9 | FC Cincinnati (United States) | 6 February 2025 | Loan | 31 December 2025 |
| 29 | Victor Hugo | AM/RW | (Brazil) | Rio de Janeiro (Rio de Janeiro (state)) | 11 May 2004 (aged 21) | 9 | 0 | Flamengo | 2 September 2025 | Loan | 31 July 2026 |
| 32 | Benjamín Rollheiser | AM/RW | (Argentina) | Coronel Suárez | 24 March 2000 (aged 25) | 40 | 3 | Benfica (Portugal) | 12 February 2025 | € 11M | 31 December 2028 |
| 49 | Gabriel Bontempo | AM/RW | (Brazil) | Uberaba (Minas Gerais) | 16 January 2005 (aged 20) | 37 | 3 | Youth system | 21 January 2025 | Free | 31 December 2028 |
Forwards
| 7 | Robinho Júnior | RW | (Brazil) | Santos (São Paulo (state)) | 17 December 2007 (aged 17) | 15 | 0 | Youth system | 19 February 2025 | Free | 30 April 2027 |
| 9 | Tiquinho Soares | ST | (Brazil) | Sousa (Paraíba) | 17 January 1991 (aged 34) | 40 | 7 | Botafogo | 24 January 2025 | Free | 31 December 2027 |
| 11 | Guilherme | LW | (Brazil) | São Paulo (São Paulo (state)) | 13 April 1995 (aged 30) | 94 | 26 | Grêmio | 31 December 2023 | R$ 4.8M | 31 December 2026 |
| 17 | Gustavo Caballero | RW/LW | (Paraguay) | San Lorenzo | 21 September 2001 (aged 24) | 12 | 1 | Nacional (Paraguay) | 24 July 2025 | € 1.3M | 31 December 2028 |
| 19 | Lautaro Díaz | ST/RW | (Argentina) | Buenos Aires | 21 May 1998 (aged 27) | 14 | 3 | Cruzeiro | 2 September 2025 | Loan | 31 July 2026 |
| 21 | Billal Brahimi | RW/LW | (Algeria) | Beaumont-sur-Oise (France) | 14 March 2000 (aged 25) | 1 | 0 | Free agent | 24 September 2025 | Free | 31 December 2026 |
| 41 | Mateus Xavier | LW/RW | (Brazil) | Ibicaraí (Bahia) | 29 June 2007 (aged 18) | 5 | 0 | Youth system | 30 June 2024 | Free | 31 July 2028 |

Source: SantosFC.com.br (for appearances and goals) and FPF (for contracts). Players in italic are not registered for the Campeonato Brasileiro Série A.

Campeonato Paulista squad
- *Players in ~~strike~~ were replaced, players in italic left the club
- A List
- Note: Flags indicate national team as defined under FIFA eligibility rules; some limited exceptions apply. Players may hold more than one non-FIFA nationality.
  | No. | Pos. | Nation | Player |
  |---|---|---|---|
  | — | GK | BRA | Diógenes |
  | — | GK | BRA | Gabriel Brazão |
  | — | GK | BRA | João Paulo |
  | — | DF | BRA | Gil |
  | — | DF | BRA | Gustavo Assis |
  | — | DF | BRA | João Basso |
  | — | DF | BRA | Luan Peres |
  | — | DF | BRA | Luisão |
  | — | DF | BRA | Zé Ivaldo |
  | — | DF | BRA | Aderlan |
  | — | DF | ARG | Gonzalo Escobar |
  | — | DF | BRA | Hayner |
  | — | DF | ARG | Leo Godoy |
  | — | MF | BRA | Diego Pituca |
  | — | MF | BRA | João Schmidt |
  | No. | Pos. | Nation | Player |
  |---|---|---|---|
  | — | MF | VEN | Nicola Profeta |
  | — | MF | VEN | Tomás Rincón |
  | — | MF | ARG | Álvaro Barreal |
  | — | MF | ARG | Benjamín Rollheiser (Note: Replaced Patrick) |
  | — | MF | BRA | Thaciano |
  | — | FW | COL | Alejandro Villarreal |
  | — | FW | BRA | Deivid Washington (Note: Replaced Lucas Braga) |
  | — | FW | BRA | Gabriel Veron |
  | — | FW | BRA | Guilherme |
  | — | FW | BRA | Neymar |
  | — | FW | BRA | Rafael Freitas |
  | — | FW | VEN | Yeferson Soteldo |
  | — | FW | BRA | Tiquinho Soares |
  | — | FW | BRA | Willian |
  | — | FW | BRA | Wendel Silva |
- B List
- Note: Flags indicate national team as defined under FIFA eligibility rules; some limited exceptions apply. Players may hold more than one non-FIFA nationality.
  | No. | Pos. | Nation | Player |
  |---|---|---|---|
  | — | GK | BRA | João Fernandes |
  | — | DF | BRA | JP Chermont |
  | — | DF | BRA | Kevyson |
  | — | DF | BRA | Souza |
  | — | DF | BRA | Vinicius Lira |
  | — | MF | BRA | Gabriel Bontempo |
  | No. | Pos. | Nation | Player |
  |---|---|---|---|
  | — | MF | BRA | Gustavo Henrique |
  | — | MF | BRA | Hyan |
  | — | MF | BOL | Miguel Terceros |
  | — | FW | BRA | Luca Meirelles |
  | — | FW | BRA | Mateus Xavier |
  | — | FW | BRA | Robinho Júnior |
  Notes

=== Appearances and goals ===
| No. | Pos. | Nat | Name | Campeonato Brasileiro | | Campeonato Paulista | | Copa do Brasil | | Total | |
| No. | Pos. | Nat | Name | Apps | Goals | Apps | Goals | Apps | Goals | Apps | Goals |
|---|---|---|---|---|---|---|---|---|---|---|---|
| 1 | GK | (Brazil) | João Paulo | 0 | 0 | 1 | 0 | 0 | 0 | 1 | 0 |
| 12 | GK | (Brazil) | Diógenes | 0+1 | 0 | 0 | 0 | 0 | 0 | 1 | 0 |
| 77 | GK | (Brazil) | Gabriel Brazão | 38 | 0 | 13 | 0 | 2 | 0 | 53 | 0 |
| 2 | DF | (Brazil) | Mayke | 9+3 | 0 | 0 | 0 | 0 | 0 | 12 | 0 |
| 3 | DF | (Brazil) | João Basso | 6 | 1 | 4+1 | 0 | 0+1 | 0 | 12 | 1 |
| 4 | DF | (Brazil) | Gil | 8 | 0 | 6+1 | 0 | 1 | 0 | 16 | 0 |
| 13 | DF | (Brazil) | Aderlan | 1+1 | 0 | 0 | 0 | 1 | 0 | 3 | 0 |
| 14 | DF | (Brazil) | Luan Peres | 23+1 | 0 | 7+4 | 0 | 1 | 0 | 36 | 0 |
| 18 | DF | (Brazil) | Igor Vinícius | 15+5 | 0 | 0 | 0 | 0 | 0 | 20 | 0 |
| 23 | DF | (Paraguay) | Alexis Duarte | 5 | 0 | 0 | 0 | 0 | 0 | 5 | 0 |
| 25 | DF | (Brazil) | Luisão | 5+1 | 0 | 1+2 | 0 | 0 | 0 | 9 | 0 |
| 27 | DF | (Brazil) | Zé Ivaldo | 21+1 | 1 | 10+1 | 0 | 2 | 0 | 35 | 1 |
| 29 | DF | (Brazil) | Leo Godoy | 5+1 | 0 | 7+3 | 1 | 1+1 | 0 | 18 | 1 |
| 30 | DF | (Brazil) | Vinicius Lira | 0 | 0 | 2+1 | 0 | 0 | 0 | 3 | 0 |
| 31 | DF | (Argentina) | Gonzalo Escobar | 23+7 | 0 | 9+2 | 0 | 1 | 0 | 42 | 0 |
| 33 | DF | (Brazil) | Souza | 19+5 | 1 | 2+2 | 0 | 1 | 0 | 29 | 1 |
| 38 | DF | (Brazil) | Kevyson | 0+1 | 0 | 0+2 | 0 | 0 | 0 | 3 | 0 |
| 98 | DF | (Argentina) | Adonis Frías | 7+1 | 0 | 0 | 0 | 0 | 0 | 8 | 0 |
| 98 | DF | (Brazil) | JP Chermont | 7+3 | 0 | 8+1 | 0 | 0 | 0 | 19 | 0 |
| — | DF | (Brazil) | Hayner | 0 | 0 | 0+2 | 0 | 0 | 0 | 2 | 0 |
| 5 | MF | (Brazil) | João Schmidt | 25+6 | 2 | 7+6 | 1 | 1 | 0 | 45 | 3 |
| 6 | MF | (Brazil) | Zé Rafael | 22+5 | 1 | 0 | 0 | 1 | 0 | 28 | 1 |
| 8 | MF | (Venezuela) | Tomás Rincón | 11+6 | 0 | 8+4 | 0 | 1+1 | 0 | 31 | 0 |
| 10 | MF | (Brazil) | Neymar | 17+3 | 8 | 6+1 | 3 | 0+1 | 0 | 28 | 11 |
| 15 | MF | (Brazil) | Willian Arão | 9+4 | 0 | 0 | 0 | 0 | 0 | 13 | 0 |
| 16 | MF | (Brazil) | Thaciano | 5+14 | 3 | 5+6 | 2 | 0+1 | 0 | 31 | 5 |
| 20 | MF | (Brazil) | Hyan | 0+2 | 0 | 0 | 0 | 0 | 0 | 2 | 0 |
| 21 | MF | (Brazil) | Diego Pituca | 4+6 | 1 | 8+4 | 0 | 1 | 0 | 23 | 1 |
| 22 | MF | (Argentina) | Álvaro Barreal | 28+6 | 9 | 0+2 | 0 | 1 | 0 | 37 | 9 |
| 29 | MF | (Brazil) | Victor Hugo | 6+3 | 0 | 0 | 0 | 0 | 0 | 9 | 0 |
| 32 | MF | (Argentina) | Benjamín Rollheiser | 27+9 | 2 | 0+2 | 0 | 2 | 1 | 40 | 3 |
| 47 | MF | (Bolivia) | Miguel Terceros | 0 | 0 | 2+2 | 0 | 0 | 0 | 4 | 0 |
| 49 | MF | (Brazil) | Gabriel Bontempo | 9+16 | 2 | 8+3 | 1 | 0+1 | 0 | 37 | 3 |
| 88 | MF | (Brazil) | Patrick | 0 | 0 | 1 | 0 | 0 | 0 | 1 | 0 |
| 7 | FW | (Venezuela) | Yeferson Soteldo | 3+2 | 0 | 11+1 | 0 | 0 | 0 | 17 | 0 |
| 7 | FW | (Brazil) | Robinho Júnior | 2+13 | 0 | 0 | 0 | 0 | 0 | 15 | 0 |
| 9 | FW | (Brazil) | Tiquinho Soares | 13+14 | 2 | 9+2 | 5 | 1+1 | 0 | 40 | 7 |
| 11 | FW | (Brazil) | Guilherme | 27+5 | 4 | 13+1 | 10 | 2 | 0 | 48 | 14 |
| 17 | FW | (Paraguay) | Gustavo Caballero | 1+11 | 1 | 0 | 0 | 0 | 0 | 12 | 1 |
| 19 | FW | (Argentina) | Lautaro Díaz | 11+3 | 3 | 0 | 0 | 0 | 0 | 14 | 3 |
| 19 | FW | (Brazil) | Deivid Washington | 6+12 | 1 | 0+1 | 0 | 1+1 | 0 | 21 | 1 |
| 19 | FW | (Brazil) | Wendel Silva | 0 | 0 | 1+2 | 0 | 0 | 0 | 3 | 0 |
| 21 | FW | (Algeria) | Bilal Brahimi | 0+1 | 0 | 0 | 0 | 0 | 0 | 1 | 0 |
| 30 | FW | (Brazil) | Lucas Braga | 0 | 0 | 1+2 | 0 | 0 | 0 | 3 | 0 |
| 41 | FW | (Brazil) | Mateus Xavier | 0+3 | 0 | 0 | 0 | 0+1 | 0 | 4 | 0 |
| 70 | FW | (Brazil) | Gabriel Veron | 1+5 | 0 | 0+2 | 0 | 1 | 0 | 9 | 0 |
| 79 | FW | (Brazil) | Luca Meirelles | 0+7 | 0 | 3+4 | 0 | 0+1 | 0 | 15 | 0 |

Source: Match reports in Competitive matches, Soccerway. Players in italic have departed the club before the end of the season.

=== Goalscorers ===
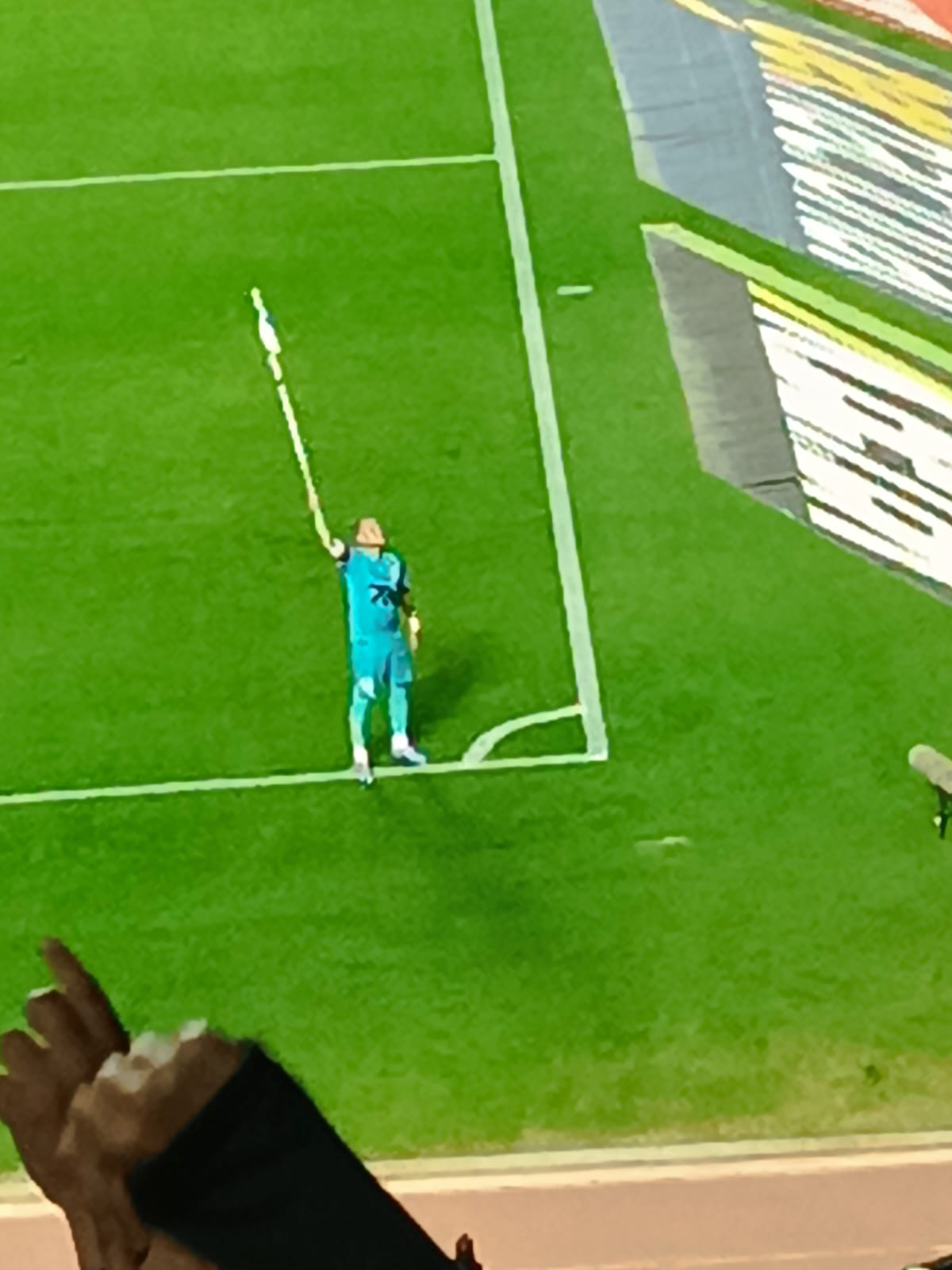
Neymar celebrating a goal against Juventude on 4 August

| Ran | No. | Pos | Nat | Name | Série A | Paulista | Copa do Brasil | Total |
|---|---|---|---|---|---|---|---|---|
| 1 | 11 | FW | (Brazil) | Guilherme | 4 | 10 | 0 | 14 |
| 2 | 10 | FW | (Brazil) | Neymar | 8 | 3 | 0 | 11 |
| 3 | 22 | MF | (Argentina) | Álvaro Barreal | 9 | 0 | 0 | 9 |
| 4 | 9 | FW | (Brazil) | Tiquinho Soares | 2 | 5 | 0 | 7 |
| 5 | 16 | MF | (Brazil) | Thaciano | 3 | 2 | 0 | 5 |
| 6 | 49 | MF | (Brazil) | Gabriel Bontempo | 2 | 1 | 0 | 3 |
| 6 | 19 | FW | (Argentina) | Lautaro Díaz | 3 | 0 | 0 | 3 |
| 6 | 32 | MF | (Argentina) | Benjamín Rollheiser | 2 | 0 | 1 | 3 |
| 6 | 5 | MF | (Brazil) | João Schmidt | 2 | 1 | 0 | 3 |
| 10 | 29 | DF | (Argentina) | Leo Godoy | 0 | 1 | 0 | 1 |
| 10 | 21 | MF | (Brazil) | Diego Pituca | 1 | 0 | 0 | 1 |
| 10 | 2 | DF | (Brazil) | Zé Ivaldo | 1 | 0 | 0 | 1 |
| 10 | 36 | FW | (Brazil) | Deivid Washington | 1 | 0 | 0 | 1 |
| 10 | 3 | DF | (Brazil) | João Basso | 1 | 0 | 0 | 1 |
| 10 | 17 | MF | (Paraguay) | Gustavo Caballero | 1 | 0 | 0 | 1 |
| 10 | 6 | MF | (Brazil) | Zé Rafael | 1 | 0 | 0 | 1 |
| 10 | 33 | DF | (Brazil) | Souza | 1 | 0 | 0 | 1 |
| Own goals | | | | | 3 | 0 | 0 | 3 |
| Total | | | | | 45 | 23 | 1 | 69 |

Source: Match reports in Competitive matches. Players in italic have departed the club before the end of the season.

=== Disciplinary record ===
| N | Nat | Pos | Name | Brasileirão | | | Paulista | | | Copa do Brasil | | | Total | | |
| N | Nat | Pos | Name | Yellow card | (yellow card) (yellow-red card) | Red card | Yellow card | (yellow card) (yellow-red card) | Red card | Yellow card | (yellow card) (yellow-red card) | Red card | Yellow card | (yellow card) (yellow-red card) | Red card |
|---|---|---|---|---|---|---|---|---|---|---|---|---|---|---|---|
| 27 | (Brazil) | DF | Zé Ivaldo | 8 | 1 | 0 | 5 | 0 | 1 | 2 | 0 | 0 | 15 | 1 | 1 |
| 31 | (Argentina) | DF | Gonzalo Escobar | 7 | 1 | 0 | 3 | 0 | 1 | 0 | 0 | 1 | 10 | 1 | 2 |
| 10 | (Brazil) | MF | Neymar | 7 | 1 | 0 | 1 | 0 | 0 | 0 | 0 | 0 | 8 | 1 | 0 |
| 14 | (Brazil) | DF | Luan Peres | 6 | 0 | 0 | 4 | 0 | 0 | 0 | 0 | 0 | 10 | 0 | 0 |
| 23 | (Paraguay) | DF | Alexis Duarte | 1 | 0 | 0 | 0 | 0 | 0 | 0 | 0 | 0 | 1 | 0 | 0 |
| 8 | (Venezuela) | MF | Tomás Rincón | 4 | 0 | 1 | 2 | 0 | 0 | 0 | 0 | 0 | 6 | 0 | 1 |
| 32 | (Argentina) | MF | Benjamín Rollheiser | 7 | 0 | 0 | 0 | 0 | 0 | 0 | 0 | 0 | 7 | 0 | 0 |
| 5 | (Venezuela) | MF | João Schmidt | 7 | 0 | 0 | 0 | 0 | 0 | 0 | 0 | 0 | 7 | 0 | 0 |
| 4 | (Brazil) | DF | Gil | 3 | 0 | 0 | 2 | 0 | 0 | 0 | 0 | 0 | 5 | 0 | 0 |
| 9 | (Brazil) | FW | Tiquinho Soares | 3 | 0 | 0 | 2 | 0 | 0 | 0 | 0 | 0 | 5 | 0 | 0 |
| 18 | (Brazil) | DF | Igor Vinícius | 4 | 0 | 0 | 0 | 0 | 0 | 0 | 0 | 0 | 4 | 0 | 0 |
| 21 | (Brazil) | MF | Diego Pituca | 2 | 0 | 0 | 2 | 0 | 0 | 0 | 0 | 0 | 4 | 0 | 0 |
| 29 | (Brazil) | DF | Leo Godoy | 1 | 0 | 0 | 2 | 0 | 0 | 1 | 0 | 0 | 4 | 0 | 0 |
| 3 | (Brazil) | DF | João Basso | 2 | 0 | 0 | 1 | 0 | 0 | 0 | 0 | 0 | 3 | 0 | 0 |
| 6 | (Brazil) | MF | Zé Rafael | 6 | 0 | 0 | 0 | 0 | 0 | 0 | 0 | 0 | 6 | 0 | 0 |
| 33 | (Brazil) | DF | Souza | 4 | 0 | 0 | 0 | 0 | 0 | 1 | 0 | 0 | 5 | 0 | 0 |
| 44 | (Brazil) | DF | JP Chermont | 2 | 0 | 0 | 1 | 0 | 0 | 0 | 0 | 0 | 3 | 0 | 0 |
| 49 | (Brazil) | MF | Gabriel Bontempo | 1 | 0 | 0 | 2 | 0 | 0 | 0 | 0 | 0 | 3 | 0 | 0 |
| 7 | (Venezuela) | FW | Yeferson Soteldo | 1 | 0 | 0 | 1 | 0 | 0 | 0 | 0 | 0 | 2 | 0 | 0 |
| 11 | (Brazil) | FW | Guilherme | 1 | 0 | 0 | 2 | 0 | 0 | 0 | 0 | 0 | 3 | 0 | 0 |
| 22 | (Argentina) | MF | Álvaro Barreal | 2 | 0 | 0 | 0 | 0 | 0 | 0 | 0 | 0 | 2 | 0 | 0 |
| 25 | (Brazil) | DF | Luisão | 2 | 0 | 0 | 0 | 0 | 0 | 0 | 0 | 0 | 2 | 0 | 0 |
| 2 | (Brazil) | DF | Mayke | 3 | 0 | 0 | 0 | 0 | 0 | 0 | 0 | 0 | 3 | 0 | 0 |
| 16 | (Brazil) | MF | Thaciano | 2 | 0 | 0 | 1 | 0 | 0 | 0 | 0 | 0 | 3 | 0 | 0 |
| 17 | (Paraguay) | FW | Gustavo Caballero | 1 | 0 | 0 | 0 | 0 | 0 | 0 | 0 | 0 | 1 | 0 | 0 |
| 19 | (Argentina) | FW | Lautaro Díaz | 2 | 0 | 0 | 0 | 0 | 0 | 0 | 0 | 0 | 2 | 0 | 0 |
| 30 | (Brazil) | DF | Vinicius Lira | 0 | 0 | 0 | 1 | 0 | 0 | 0 | 0 | 0 | 1 | 0 | 0 |
| 77 | (Brazil) | GK | Gabriel Brazão | 2 | 0 | 0 | 0 | 0 | 0 | 0 | 0 | 0 | 2 | 0 | 0 |
| 98 | (Argentina) | DF | Adonis Frías | 2 | 0 | 0 | 0 | 0 | 0 | 0 | 0 | 0 | 2 | 0 | 0 |
| TOTALS | | | | 93 | 3 | 1 | 32 | 0 | 2 | 4 | 0 | 1 | 129 | 3 | 4 |

Source: Match reports in Competitive matches, Soccerway (yellow card) = Number of bookings; (yellow card) (yellow-red card) = Number of sending offs after a second yellow card; (red card) = Number of sending offs by a direct red card. Players in italic have departed the club before the end of the season.

=== Suspensions served ===
| Date | Matches Missed | Player | Reason | Opponents Missed | Competition |
|---|---|---|---|---|---|
| 1 February | 1 | Zé Ivaldo | 3x (yellow card) | Botafogo-SP (H) | Campeonato Paulista |
| 5 February | 1 | Gonzalo Escobar | 3x (yellow card) | Novorizontino (A) | Campeonato Paulista |
| 12 February | 1 | Luan Peres | 3x (yellow card) | Água Santa (H) | Campeonato Paulista |
| 1 May | 1 | Gonzalo Escobar | (red card) vs CRB | CRB (A) | Copa do Brasil |
| 18 May | 1 | Gonzalo Escobar | (red card) vs Corinthians | Vitória (A) | Série A |
| 18 May | 1 | Zé Ivaldo | 3x (yellow card) | Vitória (A) | Série A |
| 25 May | 1 | Luan Peres | 3x (yellow card) | Botafogo (H) | Série A |
| 1 June | 1 | Neymar | (red card) vs Botafogo | Fortaleza (A) | Série A |
| 12 June | 1 | JP Chermont | 3x (yellow card) | Flamengo (H) | Série A |
| 12 June | 1 | João Schmidt | 3x (yellow card) | Flamengo (H) | Série A |
| 12 June | 1 | Benjamín Rollheiser | 3x (yellow card) | Flamengo (H) | Série A |
| 19 July | 1 | Tomás Rincón | 3x (yellow card) | Internacional (H) | Série A |
| 23 July | 1 | Gil | 3x (yellow card) | Sport Recife (A) | Série A |
| 26 July | 1 | Tomás Rincón | (red card) vs Sport Recife | Juventude (H) | Série A |
| 17 August | 1 | Neymar | 3x (yellow card) | Bahia (A) | Série A |
| 31 August | 1 | Gonzalo Escobar | 3x (yellow card) | Atlético Mineiro (A) | Série A |
| 31 August | 1 | Benjamín Rollheiser | 3x (yellow card) | Atlético Mineiro (H) | Série A |
| 14 September | 1 | Zé Ivaldo | (red card) vs Atlético Mineiro | São Paulo (H) | Série A |
| 5 October | 1 | Igor Vinícius | 3x (yellow card) | Corinthians (H) | Série A |
| 5 October | 1 | Tiquinho Soares | 3x (yellow card) | Corinthians (H) | Série A |
| 15 October | 1 | João Schmidt | 3x (yellow card) | Vitória (H) | Série A |
| 20 October | 1 | Zé Rafael | 3x (yellow card) | Botafogo (A) | Série A |
| 27 October | 1 | Souza | 3x (yellow card) | Fortaleza (H) | Série A |
| 1 November | 1 | Luan Peres | 3x (yellow card) | Palmeiras (H) | Série A |
| 24 November | 1 | Mayke | 3x (yellow card) | Sport Recife (H) | Série A |
| 3 December | 1 | Zé Rafael | 3x (yellow card) | Cruzeiro (H) | Série A |

Source: Match reports in Competitive matches

== Coaches ==
| Name | Nat. | Place of birth | Date of birth (age) | Signed from | Date signed | Role | G | W | D | L | % | Departure | Manner | Contract end |
|---|---|---|---|---|---|---|---|---|---|---|---|---|---|---|
| Pedro Caixinha | (Portugal) | Beja | 15 November 1970 (age 55) | Free agent | 23 December 2024 | Permanent | 16 | 6 | 3 | 7 | 37.50 | 14 April 2025 | Sacked | 31 December 2026 |
| Pedro Malta | (Portugal) | Castelo Branco | 20 May 1980 (age 46) | Staff | 5 February 2025 | Interim (Note: Interim for the match against Botafogo-SP as Caixinha was suspended) | 1 | 0 | 1 | 0 | 0.00 | 5 February 2025 | Return (Note: Back to assistant role after the match) | —N/a |
| César Sampaio | (Brazil) | São Paulo (São Paulo (state)) | 31 March 1968 (age 58) | Staff | 14 April 2025 | Interim | 3 | 1 | 0 | 2 | 33.33 | 29 April 2025 | Return | —N/a |
| Cleber Xavier | (Brazil) | Alegrete (Rio Grande do Sul) | 29 March 1964 (age 62) | Free agent | 29 April 2025 | Permanent | 15 | 5 | 4 | 6 | 33.33 | 17 August 2025 | Sacked | 31 December 2025 |
| Matheus Bachi | (Brazil) | Caxias do Sul (Rio Grande do Sul) | 8 January 1989 (age 37) | Staff | 17 August 2025 | Interim | 1 | 0 | 0 | 1 | 0.00 | 23 August 2025 | Return | —N/a |
| Juan Pablo Vojvoda | (Argentina) | General Baldissera | 13 January 1975 (age 51) | Free agent | 22 August 2025 | Permanent | 18 | 6 | 8 | 4 | 33.33 | | | 31 December 2026 |

== Transfers ==
=== Transfers in ===
| N. | Pos. | Name | Age | Moving from | Type | Fee | Source |
|---|---|---|---|---|---|---|---|
| 30 | LW | (Brazil) Lucas Braga | 28 | (Japan) Shimizu S-Pulse | Loan return | Free | |
| 7 | LW | (Venezuela) Yeferson Soteldo | 27 | (Brazil) Grêmio | Loan return | Free | |
| 25 | CB | (Brazil) Luisão | 21 | (Brazil) Novorizontino | Transfer | Undisclosed | |
| 16 | AM | (Brazil) Thaciano | 29 | (Brazil) Bahia | Transfer | Undisclosed | |
| 10 | LW | (Brazil) Neymar | 32 | (Saudi Arabia) Al-Hilal | Transfer | Free | |
| 32 | RW | (Argentina) Benjamín Rollheiser | 24 | (Portugal) Benfica | Transfer | € 11,000,000 | |
| 6 | DM | (Brazil) Zé Rafael | 31 | (Brazil) Palmeiras | Transfer | Undisclosed | |

=== Loans in ===
| N. | Pos. | Name | Age | Loaned from | Loan expires | Fee | Source |
|---|---|---|---|---|---|---|---|
| 2 | CB | (Brazil) Zé Ivaldo | 27 | (Brazil) Cruzeiro | December 2025 | Free | |
| 29 | RB | (Argentina) Leo Godoy | 29 | (Brazil) Athletico Paranaense | December 2025 | Free | |
| 70 | RW | (Brazil) Gabriel Veron | 22 | (Portugal) Porto | December 2025 | Free | |
| 22 | LM | (Argentina) Álvaro Barreal | 24 | (United States) FC Cincinnati | December 2025 | Free | |
| 36 | ST | (Brazil) Deivid Washington | 19 | (England) Chelsea | December 2025 | Free | |

=== Transfers out ===
| N. | Pos. | Name | Age | Moving to | Type | Fee | Source |
|---|---|---|---|---|---|---|---|
| 18 | GK | (Brazil) Renan | 35 | (Brazil) Amazonas | Contract ended | Free | |
| 25 | DM | (Brazil) Alison | 31 | (Brazil) Londrina | Contract ended | Free | |
| 66 | FW | (Uruguay) Nacho Laquintana | 25 | (Brazil) Red Bull Bragantino | Loan ended | Free | |
| 7 | FW | (Brazil) Pedrinho | 25 | (Russia) Lokomotiv Moscow | Loan ended | Free | |
| 81 | FW | (Ecuador) Billy Arce | 26 | (Colombia) Atlético Nacional | Contract rescinded | Free | |
| 22 | AM | (Venezuela) Rómulo Otero | 32 | (Uruguay) Nacional | Contract ended | Free | |
| — | AM | (Brazil) Lucas Barbosa | 23 | (Brazil) Red Bull Bragantino | Transfer | R$ 16,000,000 | |
| — | RB | (Brazil) João Lucas | 26 | (Brazil) Grêmio | Transfer | Undisclosed | |
| — | AM | (Brazil) Lucas Lima | 34 | (Brazil) Sport Recife | Contract rescinded | Free | |
| 20 | AM | (Brazil) Giuliano | 34 | (Brazil) Athletico Paranaense | Contract rescinded | Free | |
| 17 | ST | (The Gambia) Yusupha Njie | 30 | (Qatar) Al-Markhiya | Loan terminated | Free | |
| 19 | ST | (Brazil) Wendel Silva | 24 | (Portugal) Porto | Loan terminated | Free | |
| 30 | LW | (Brazil) Lucas Braga | 28 | (Brazil) Vitória | Transfer | R$ 5,000,000 | |
| 32 | CB | (Brazil) Jair | 19 | (Brazil) Botafogo | Transfer | Undisclosed | |
| — | GK | (Brazil) Vladimir | 35 | (Brazil) Atlético Goianiense | Contract rescinded | Free | |
| 27 | ST | (Brazil) Willian | 36 | (Brazil) América Mineiro | Contract rescinded | Free | |
| 29 | RB | (Argentina) Leo Godoy | 30 | (Brazil) Athletico Paranaense | Loan ended | Free | |
| — | FW | (Argentina) Julio Furch | 35 | Free agent | Contract rescinded | Free | |
| 7 | FW | (Venezuela) Yeferson Soteldo | 27 | (Brazil) Fluminense | Transfer | R$ 30,000,000 | |

=== Loans out ===
| N. | Pos. | Name | Age | Loaned to | Loan expires | Source |
|---|---|---|---|---|---|---|
| — | CB | (Brazil) Messias | 30 | (Brazil) Goiás | November 2025 | |
| — | DM | (Brazil) Matheus Nunes | 21 | (Brazil) Portuguesa | November 2025 | |
| — | CB | (Brazil) Alex | 25 | (Brazil) Portuguesa | April 2025 | |
| — | DM | (Brazil) Balão | 21 | (Brazil) Sampaio Corrêa | October 2025 | |
| — | CB | (Brazil) Luiz Felipe | 31 | (Brazil) Goiás | November 2025 | |
| 28 | DM | (Brazil) Vinicius Balieiro | 25 | (Brazil) Chapecoense | November 2025 | |
| — | DM | (Brazil) Kevin Malthus | 22 | (Brazil) Cianorte | November 2025 | |
| — | DM | (Uruguay) Rodrigo Fernández | 29 | (Argentina) Independiente | December 2025 | |
| 29 | RB | (Brazil) Rodrigo Ferreira | 29 | (Brazil) São Bernardo | November 2025 | |
| — | ST | (Bolivia) Enzo Monteiro | 20 | (Latvia) Auda | December 2025 | |
| 88 | AM | (Brazil) Patrick | 32 | (Brazil) Athletico Paranaense | December 2025 | |
| — | RB | (Brazil) Hayner | 29 | (Brazil) CRB | November 2025 | |
| — | DM | (Brazil) Sandry | 22 | (Brazil) Athletic-MG | November 2025 | |
| 47 | AM | (Bolivia) Miguel Terceros | 20 | (Brazil) América Mineiro | November 2025 | |
| — | CB | (Brazil) Alex | 25 | (Brazil) Athletic-MG | November 2025 | |

== Pre-season and friendlies ==
Win Draw Loss Fixtures

| 9 January 2025 Friendly | Santos | 1–4 | Athletic-MG | Santos |
| | Guilherme (pen.) | Report | Welinton Torrão; Gustavão; Neto Costa | Stadium: CT Rei Pelé |

| 16 March 2025 Friendly | Coritiba | 1–4 | Santos | Curitiba |
| | Nicolas Careca 13'; Machado (yellow card) 19'; Fracchia (yellow card) 80' | Report | 30' Zé Ivaldo; 2' (pen.), 41' Tiquinho Soares; (yellow card) 64' Kevyson; 76' Deivid; (yellow card) 89' Luisão | Stadium: Couto Pereira; Referee: José Mendonça da Silva Junior |

| 28 May 2025 Friendly | RB Leipzig (Germany) | 3–1 | (Brazil) Santos | Bragança Paulista |
| 19:00 | Simons 15', 63'; Openda 58' | Report | (yellow card) 39' Luisão; (yellow card) 45' Escobar; 69' Hyan | Stadium: Cícero de Souza Marques; Attendance: 7,604; Referee: Daiane Caroline Muniz dos Santos |

| 10 July 2025 Vitória Cup | Desportiva Ferroviária | 1–3 | Santos | Cariacica |
| 20:15 | Alex Galo (yellow card) 7'; Chrismar (yellow card) 47'; Mariano 64' | Report | 19' (pen.) Neymar; 30' Guilherme; 74' Diego Pituca | Stadium: Kleber Andrade; Referee: Wesley Silva dos Santos |
Note: Match ended in the 86th minute due to pitch invasions

== Competitions ==
=== Overview ===
| Competition | First match | Last match | Starting round | Final position | Record | | | | | | | |
| Competition | First match | Last match | Starting round | Final position | Pld | W | D | L | GF | GA | GD | Win % |
|---|---|---|---|---|---|---|---|---|---|---|---|---|
| Série A | 30 March 2025 | 7 December 2025 | Matchday 1 | 12th | 38 | 12 | 11 | 15 | 45 | 50 | −5 | 31.58 |
| Copa do Brasil | 1 May 2025 | 22 May 2025 | Third round | Third round | 2 | 0 | 2 | 0 | 1 | 1 | +0 | 0.00 |
| Campeonato Paulista | 16 January 2025 | 9 March 2025 | Matchday 1 | Semi-final | 14 | 6 | 3 | 5 | 23 | 16 | +7 | 42.86 |
| Total | | | | | 54 | 18 | 16 | 20 | 69 | 67 | +2 | 33.33 |

Source: Competitions

=== Campeonato Paulista ===
==== Results summary ====
| Overall | | | | | | | | Home | | | | | | Away | | | | | |
| Pld | W | D | L | GF | GA | GD | Pts | W | D | L | GF | GA | GD | W | D | L | GF | GA | GD |
|---|---|---|---|---|---|---|---|---|---|---|---|---|---|---|---|---|---|---|---|
| 12 | 5 | 3 | 4 | 20 | 14 | +6 | 18 | 4 | 1 | 1 | 13 | 6 | +7 | 1 | 2 | 3 | 7 | 8 | −1 |

Source: Soccerway

==== Group stage ====
| Pos | Team | Pld | W | D | L | GF | GA | GD | Pts | Qualification |
|---|---|---|---|---|---|---|---|---|---|---|
| 1 | Santos | 12 | 5 | 3 | 4 | 20 | 14 | +6 | 18 | Knockout stage |
| 2 | Red Bull Bragantino | 12 | 5 | 2 | 5 | 14 | 13 | +1 | 17 | Knockout stage |
| 3 | Guarani | 12 | 3 | 4 | 5 | 14 | 14 | 0 | 13 | |
| 4 | Portuguesa | 12 | 2 | 7 | 3 | 15 | 16 | −1 | 13 | |

Source: Soccerway

==== Matches ====
| 16 January 1 | Santos | 2–1 | Mirassol | Santos |
| 21:30 UTC-03:00 | Guilherme 45+3', 86'; Escobar (yellow card) 56'; Luan Peres (yellow card) 72'; Diego Pituca (yellow card) 79' | Report | (yellow card) 27' Neto Moura; (yellow card) 78' Danielzinho; (yellow card) 81' Reinaldo; 90+6' (pen.) Iury Castilho | Stadium: Vila Belmiro; Attendance: 10,379; Referee: Flávio Rodrigues de Souza |

| 19 January 2 | Ponte Preta | 1–1 | Santos | Campinas |
| 20:30 UTC-03:00 | Jean Dias 43'; Serginho (yellow card) 76' | Report | (yellow card) 20' Escobar; 54' Guilherme; (yellow card) 62' Zé Ivaldo; (yellow card) 73' Luan Peres | Stadium: Estádio Moisés Lucarelli; Attendance: 6,496; Referee: Vinícius Gonçalves Dias Araújo |

| 22 January 3 | Santos | 1–2 | Palmeiras | Santos |
| 21:35 UTC-03:00 | Guilherme 36'; Léo Godoy (yellow card) 79' | Report | 68' Thalys; (yellow card) 88' Murilo; 90+2' Richard Ríos | Stadium: Vila Belmiro; Attendance: 13,910; Referee: Matheus Delgado Candançan |

| 25 January 4 | Velo Clube | 2–1 | Santos | Rio Claro |
| 18:30 UTC-03:00 | Gabriel Mancha (yellow card) 13'; Daniel Amorim 53', 84'; Léo Baiano (yellow card) 73'; Itambé (yellow card) 90+5' | Report | 90' Leo Godoy | Stadium: Benitão; Attendance: 4,778; Referee: Edina Alves Batista |

| 29 January 5 | São Bernardo | 3–1 | Santos | São Bernardo do Campo |
| 18:30 UTC-03:00 | Hugo Sanches (yellow card) 34'; Lucas Tocantins 61'; Hélder (yellow card) 64'; Emerson Santos (yellow card) 69'; Lucas Lima (yellow card) 79'; Augusto 87', (yellow card) 88'; Lucas Rian 90+2' | Report | 48', (yellow card) 89' Guilherme; (yellow card) 51' Vinicius Lira; (yellow card) 60' Zé Ivaldo | Stadium: Estádio 1º de Maio; Attendance: 4,251; Referee: João Vitor Gobi |

| 1 February 6 | Santos | 3–1 | São Paulo | Santos |
| 21:15 UTC-03:00 | Rincón (yellow card) 25'; Tiquinho Soares (yellow card) 41'; Guilherme 42', 71'; Bontempo 52'; Zé Ivaldo (yellow card) 87'; Leo Godoy (yellow card) 87' | Report | 35' Lucas Moura; (yellow card) 79' Sabino; (yellow card) 87' André Silva; (yellow card) 87' Ferreira | Stadium: Vila Belmiro; Attendance: 14,268; Referee: Luiz Flávio de Oliveira |

| 5 February 7 | Santos | 1–1 | Botafogo-SP | Santos |
| 21:35 UTC-03:00 | Diego Pituca (yellow card) 29'; Tiquinho Soares 38' (pen.); Rincón (yellow card) 45+4'; Escobar (yellow card) 81' | Report | (yellow card) 39' (yellow-red card) 71' Wallison; (yellow card) 45+4' Edson; (yellow card) 49' Alisson Cassiano; (yellow card) 52' Gabriel Bispo; 67' Alexandre Jesus | Stadium: Vila Belmiro; Attendance: 15,377; Referee: Matheus Delgado Candançan |

| 9 February 8 | Novorizontino | 0–0 | Santos | Novo Horizonte |
| 16:00 UTC-03:00 | | Report | (yellow card) 54' Zé Ivaldo; (yellow card) 85' João Basso | Stadium: Estádio Doutor Jorge Ismael de Biasi; Attendance: 10,851; Referee: Flávio Rodrigues de Souza |

| 12 February 9 | Corinthians | 2–1 | Santos | São Paulo |
| 21:35 UTC-03:00 | Matheuzinho (yellow card) 8'; Yuri Alberto 17', 44'; Raniele (yellow card) 34'; Ryan (yellow card) 49'; João Pedro (yellow card) 67'; André Ramalho (yellow card) 73' | Report | (yellow card) 36' Luan Peres; (yellow card) 45+3' Tiquinho Soares; (yellow card) 51' Zé Ivaldo; 79' Guilherme | Stadium: Neo Química Arena; Attendance: 48,169; Referee: Edina Alves Batista |

| 16 February 10 | Santos | 3–1 | Água Santa | Santos |
| 20:30 UTC-03:00 | Neymar 14' (pen.); Thaciano 26', (yellow card) 33'; João Paulo (yellow card) 54'; Bontempo (yellow card) 59'; Guilherme 70', (yellow card) 90+4'; Soteldo (yellow card) 90+7' | Report | (yellow card) 22', (goal) 43' Netinho | Stadium: Vila Belmiro; Attendance: 13,795; Referee: Vinícius Gonçalves Dias Araújo |

| 19 February 11 | Santos | 3–0 | Noroeste | Santos |
| 19:15 UTC-03:00 | Neymar (yellow card) 18'; Guilherme 45+4'; Tiquinho Soares 57'; JP Chermont (yellow card) 66'; Thaciano 78' | Report | (yellow card) 17' Jonatas Paulista; (yellow card) 18' Rodolfo; (yellow card) 58' Maycon; (yellow card) 61' Pedro Felipe; (yellow card) 86' Matheus Blade | Stadium: Vila Belmiro; Attendance: 12,339; Referee: Matheus Delgado Candançan |

| 23 February 12 | Inter de Limeira | 0–3 | Santos | Limeira |
| 18:30 UTC-03:00 | Ramon (yellow card) 45'; Flávio (yellow card) 66' | Report | 9', 32' Tiquinho Soares; 27' Neymar; (yellow card) 57' Luan Peres | Stadium: Estádio Major José Levy Sobrinho; Attendance: 17,067; Referee: Vinícius Gonçalves Dias Araújo |

==== Knockout stage ====
===== Quarter-final =====
| 2 March Single match | Santos | 2–0 | Red Bull Bragantino | Santos |
| 20:45 UTC-03:00 | Neymar 9'; Bontempo (yellow card) 37'; Gil (yellow card) 50'; João Schmidt 56' | Report | (yellow card) 33' Matheus Fernandes | Stadium: Vila Belmiro; Attendance: 14,832; Referee: Raphael Claus |

===== Semi-final =====
| 9 March Single match | Corinthians | 2–1 | Santos | São Paulo |
| 18:30 UTC-03:00 | Yuri Alberto 12'; Angileri (yellow card) 45'; Charles (yellow card) 51'; Garro 56'; Depay (yellow card) 86'; Alex Santana (yellow card) 90+5' | Report | 38' Tiquinho Soares; (red card) 81' Zé Ivaldo; (yellow card) 86' Gil; (red card) 90+7' Escobar | Stadium: Neo Química Arena; Attendance: 48,046; Referee: Matheus Delgado Candançan |

=== Série A ===
==== League table ====
| Pos | Team | Pld | W | D | L | GF | GA | GD | Pts | Qualification or relegation |
|---|---|---|---|---|---|---|---|---|---|---|
| 10 | Red Bull Bragantino | 38 | 14 | 6 | 18 | 45 | 57 | −12 | 48 | Qualification for Copa Sudamericana group stage |
| 11 | Atlético Mineiro | 38 | 12 | 12 | 14 | 43 | 44 | −1 | 48 | Qualification for Copa Sudamericana group stage |
| 12 | Santos | 38 | 12 | 11 | 15 | 45 | 50 | −5 | 47 | Qualification for Copa Sudamericana group stage |
| 13 | Corinthians | 38 | 12 | 11 | 15 | 42 | 47 | −5 | 47 | Qualification for Copa Libertadores group stage (Note: Corinthians qualified for the Copa Libertadores group stage by winning the 2025 Copa do Brasil.) |
| 14 | Vasco da Gama | 38 | 13 | 6 | 19 | 55 | 60 | −5 | 45 | Qualification for Copa Sudamericana group stage |

Source: CBF
Rules for classification: 1) points; 2) wins; 3) goal difference; 4) goals scored; 5) head-to-head results (only between two teams); 6) fewest red cards; 7) fewest yellow cards; 8) drawing of lots.

==== Results summary ====
| Overall | | | | | | | | Home | | | | | | Away | | | | | |
| Pld | W | D | L | GF | GA | GD | Pts | W | D | L | GF | GA | GD | W | D | L | GF | GA | GD |
|---|---|---|---|---|---|---|---|---|---|---|---|---|---|---|---|---|---|---|---|
| 38 | 12 | 11 | 15 | 45 | 50 | −5 | 47 | 8 | 6 | 5 | 24 | 21 | +3 | 4 | 5 | 10 | 21 | 29 | −8 |

Source: Soccerway

==== Results by round ====
| Round | 1 | 2 | 3 | 4 | 5 | 6 | 7 | 8 | 9 | 10 | 11 | 12 | 13 | 14 | 15 | 16 | 17 | 18 | 19 | 20 | 21 | 22 | 23 | 24 | 25 | 26 | 27 | 28 | 29 | 30 | 31 | 32 | 33 | 34 | 35 | 36 | 37 | 38 |
|---|---|---|---|---|---|---|---|---|---|---|---|---|---|---|---|---|---|---|---|---|---|---|---|---|---|---|---|---|---|---|---|---|---|---|---|---|---|---|
| Ground | A | H | A | H | A | H | A | H | A | A | H | A | H | H | A | H | A | H | A | H | A | H | A | H | A | H | A | H | H | A | H | A | A | H | A | H | A | H |
| Result | L | D | L | W | L | L | L | D | L | W | L | W | W | W | L | L | D | W | W | L | L | D | D | W | D | D | L | W | L | D | D | L | L | D | D | W | W | W |
| Position | 17 | 16 | 18 | 13 | 18 | 19 | 19 | 19 | 19 | 18 | 18 | 15 | 16 | 13 | 17 | 17 | 17 | 15 | 14 | 15 | 15 | 16 | 16 | 14 | 16 | 16 | 16 | 16 | 16 | 16 | 16 | 17 | 17 | 16 | 17 | 16 | 14 | 12 |

Source: Globo Esporte
P = Postponed

==== Matches ====
| 30 March 1 | Vasco | 2–1 | Santos | Rio de Janeiro |
| 18:30 UTC-03:00 | Piton (yellow card) 33'; Nuno Moreira 53'; Vegetti 78' | Report | 21' Barreal; (yellow card) 90+5' JP Chermont | Stadium: São Januário; Attendance: 19,550; Referee: Rafael Rodrigo Klein |

| 6 April 2 | Santos | 2–2 | Bahia | Santos |
| 20:30 UTC-03:00 | João Schmidt (yellow card) 40'; Thaciano 50'; Gil (yellow card) 56'; Soteldo (yellow card) 70'; Diego Pituca 81', (yellow card) 82'; JP Chermont (yellow card) 90+7' | Report | 17', (yellow card) 87' Erick; (yellow card) 51' Caio Alexandre; 90' Luciano Juba | Stadium: Vila Belmiro; Attendance: 8,796; Referee: Alex Gomes Stefano |

| 13 April 3 | Fluminense | 1–0 | Santos | Rio de Janeiro |
| 19:30 UTC-03:00 | Cano (yellow card) 37'; Bernal (yellow card) 78'; Samuel Xavier 90+6' | Report | (yellow card) 31' Zé Ivaldo; (yellow card) 39' João Paulo; (yellow card) 60' Neymar; (yellow card) 83' Leo Godoy | Stadium: Maracanã; Attendance: 46,172; Referee: Felipe Fernandes de Lima |

| 16 April 4 | Santos | 2–0 | Atlético Mineiro | Santos |
| 21:30 UTC-03:00 | Zé Ivaldo 24', (yellow card) 62'; Barreal 27'; João Schmidt (yellow card) 61'; Tiquinho Soares (yellow card) 90+8' | Report | (yellow card) 45+1' Caio Paulista; (yellow card) 77' Hulk; (yellow card) 90+5' Cuello | Stadium: Vila Belmiro; Attendance: 10,360; Referee: Bráulio da Silva Machado |

| 20 April 5 | São Paulo | 2–1 | Santos | São Paulo |
| 16:00 UTC-03:00 | Ferreira 10', (yellow card) 66'; André Silva 23'; Sabino (yellow card) 41'; Marcos Antônio (yellow card) 45+5'; Rafael (yellow card) 57'; Alisson (yellow card) 63'; Matheus Alves (yellow card) 75'; Rodriguinho (yellow card) 90+2'; Enzo Díaz (yellow card) 90+5' | Report | (yellow card) 31' Rollheiser; 45+3' (pen.), (yellow card) 48' Tiquinho Soares; (yellow card) 90+8' Gil | Stadium: Morumbi; Attendance: 52,436; Referee: Wilton Pereira Sampaio |

| 27 April 6 | Santos | 1–2 | Red Bull Bragantino | Santos |
| 20:30 UTC-03:00 | Diego Pituca (yellow card) 28'; Rollheiser (yellow card) 79'; Deivid Washington 90+4' | Report | (yellow card) 22' Hurtado; (yellow card) 31' Guzmán Rodríguez; (yellow card) 31', (goal) 63' Sasha; (yellow card) 61' Vinicinho; 83' Laquintana; (yellow card) 90+1' Lucas Barbosa | Stadium: Vila Belmiro; Attendance: 7,679; Referee: Raphael Claus |

| 4 May 7 | Grêmio | 1–0 | Santos | Porto Alegre |
| 16:00 UTC-03:00 | Igor Serrote (yellow card) 36'; Braithwaite (yellow card) 48'; Kannemann (yellow card) 57'; Cristian Olivera 77'; Marlon Xavier (yellow card) 90+3'; Edenilson (yellow card) 90+5' | Report | (yellow card) 5' Luan Peres; (yellow card) 10' Luisão; (yellow card) 75' Rincón | Stadium: Arena do Grêmio; Attendance: 27,085; Referee: Bruno Arleu de Araújo |

| 12 May 8 | Santos | 0–0 | Ceará | São Paulo |
| 20:00 UTC-03:00 | Rincón (yellow card) 39' | Report | Lucas Mugni (yellow card) 58'; Fernando Sobral (yellow card) 66' | Stadium: Allianz Parque; Attendance: 35,240; Referee: Felipe Fernandes de Lima |

| 18 May 9 | Corinthians | 1–0 | Santos | São Paulo |
| 16:00 UTC-03:00 | Yuri Alberto 66'; Coronado (yellow card) 72'; José Martínez (yellow card) 80' | Report | (yellow card) 9' Zé Rafael; (yellow card) 28' (yellow-red card) 80' Escobar; (yellow card) 63' Zé Ivaldo; (yellow card) 89' João Paulo; (yellow card) 90+1' Luan Peres | Stadium: Neo Química Arena; Attendance: 46,932; Referee: Raphael Claus |

| 25 May 10 | Vitória | 0–1 | Santos | Salvador |
| 18:30 UTC-03:00 | Matheuzinho (yellow card) 17'; Ricardo Ryller (yellow card) 28'; Baralhas (yellow card) 52' | Report | (yellow card) 9' Luan Peres; 18' Guilherme | Stadium: Barradão; Attendance: 27,515; Referee: Anderson Daronco |

| 1 June 11 | Santos | 0–1 | Botafogo | Santos |
| 16:00 UTC-03:00 | Escobar (yellow card) 37'; Neymar (yellow card) 45+4' (yellow-red card) 76'; Zé Ivaldo (yellow card) 90' | Report | (yellow card) 57' Alex Telles; (yellow card) 73' Mastriani; 86' Artur | Stadium: Vila Belmiro; Attendance: 13,787; Referee: Davi de Oliveira Lacerda |

| 12 June 12 | Fortaleza | 2–3 | Santos | Fortaleza |
| 19:30 UTC-03:00 | Marinho (yellow card) 57'; Brítez (yellow card) 66'; Pikachu 71' (pen.), 74' (pen.); Zé Welison (yellow card) 79'; Bruno Pacheco (yellow card) 86'; David Luiz (yellow card) 90' | Report | 15' Barreal; (yellow card) 35' Benjamín Rollheiser; 41' Guilherme; 90+2' (o.g.) João Ricardo; (yellow card) 90+3' JP Chermont; (yellow card) 90+6' João Schmidt | Stadium: Arena Castelão; Attendance: 20,381; Referee: Paulo César Zanovelli da Silva |

| 16 July 14 | Santos | 1–0 | Flamengo | Santos |
| 20:00 UTC-03:00 | João Basso (yellow card) 41'; Luan Peres (yellow card) 72'; Neymar 84' | Report | (yellow card) 23' Jorginho; (yellow card) 74' De Arrascaeta; (yellow card) 76' Bruno Henrique | Stadium: Vila Belmiro; Attendance: 13,541; Referee: Felipe Fernandes de Lima |

| 19 July 15 | Mirassol | 3–0 | Santos | Mirassol |
| 18:30 UTC-03:00 | Lucas Ramon (yellow card) 58'; Chico 69'; Reinaldo 73'; Cristian Renato 90+2'; João Victor (red card) 90+6' | Report | (yellow card) 46' Rincón | Stadium: Estádio José Maria de Campos Maia; Attendance: 11,632; Referee: Matheus Delgado Candançan |

| 23 July 16 | Santos | 1–2 | Internacional | Santos |
| 21:30 UTC-03:00 | Souza (yellow card) 37'; João Basso (yellow card) 81'; Igor Vinícius (yellow card) 83'; Barreal 90+1'; Gil (yellow card) 90+4' | Report | 9' Carbonero; (yellow card) 12' Vitão; 75' (pen.) Borré; (yellow card) 81' Valencia | Stadium: Vila Belmiro; Attendance: 11,686; Referee: Lucas Paulo Torezin |

| 26 July 17 | Sport | 2–2 | Santos | Recife |
| 18:30 UTC-03:00 | Derik Lacerda 4'; Lucas Lima (yellow card) 29'; Zé Lucas (yellow card) 38'; Caballero 70' (o.g.); Hyoran (yellow card) 86' | Report | (yellow card) 40' Escobar; (red card) 45+5' Rincón; 79' Bontempo; (yellow card) 82' Barreal; 88' João Basso | Stadium: Ilha do Retiro; Attendance: 26,018; Referee: Rafael Rodrigo Klein |

| 4 August 18 | Santos | 3–1 | Juventude | São Paulo |
| 20:00 UTC-03:00 | Bontempo (yellow card) 29'; Rollheiser (yellow card) 34'; Neymar 37', 80' (pen.), (yellow card) 52'; Barreal 40' | Report | (yellow card) 6' Marcos Paulo; (yellow card) 22', (goal) 45+1' Ángel; (yellow card) 52' Caíque | Stadium: Morumbi; Attendance: 37,485; Referee: Paulo César Zanovelli da Silva |

| 10 August 19 | Cruzeiro | 1–2 | Santos | Belo Horizonte |
| 18:30 UTC-03:00 | Villalba (yellow card) 24'; Lucas Romero (yellow card) 34'; Christian (yellow card) 41'; Fabrício Bruno 43'; Kaiki Bruno (yellow card) 57'; Matheus Pereira (yellow card) 90+2' | Report | (yellow card) 10' Rincón; (yellow card) 35' Neymar; (yellow card) 48', (goal) 89' Caballero; (yellow card) 60' Zé Rafael; 62' Guilherme | Stadium: Mineirão; Attendance: 59,345; Referee: Wilton Pereira Sampaio |

| 17 August 20 | Santos | 0–6 | Vasco | São Paulo |
| 16:00 UTC-03:00 | Luisão (yellow card) 15'; Neymar (yellow card) 39' | Report | (yellow card) 1' Hugo Moura; 18' Piton; (yellow card) 38' Jair; (yellow card) 41', (goal) 68' Tchê Tchê; 52' David; 54', 62' Coutinho; 60', (yellow card) 61' Rayan | Stadium: Morumbi; Attendance: 54,474; Referee: Ramon Abatti Abel |

| 24 August 21 | Bahia | 2–0 | Santos | Salvador |
| 16:00 UTC-03:00 | Luciano Juba 12'; Luciano Rodríguez 60'; Ademir (yellow card) 61'; Acevedo (yellow card) 64' | Report | (yellow card) 76' Rollheiser | Stadium: Arena Fonte Nova; Attendance: 45,813; Referee: Rafael Rodrigo Klein |

| 31 August 22 | Santos | 0–0 | Fluminense | Santos |
| 16:00 UTC-03:00 | Escobar (yellow card) 73'; Rollheiser (yellow card) 82'; Neymar (yellow card) 90+4' | Report | (yellow card) 30' Moreno; (yellow card) 45' Martinelli; (yellow card) 86' Serna; (yellow card) 90+3' Thiago Santos | Stadium: Vila Belmiro; Attendance: 12,515; Referee: Wilton Pereira Sampaio |

| 14 September 23 | Atlético Mineiro | 1–1 | Santos | Belo Horizonte |
| 16:00 UTC-03:00 | Hulk (yellow card) 45+4'; Igor Gomes 59'; Alexsander (yellow card) 81' | Report | (yellow card) 32' (yellow-red card) 55' Zé Ivaldo; (yellow card) 64' João Schmidt; (yellow card) 75' Igor Vinícius; 87' Tiquinho Soares | Stadium: Arena MRV; Attendance: 38,262; Referee: Bruno Arleu de Araújo |

| 21 September 24 | Santos | 1–0 | São Paulo | Santos |
| 20:30 UTC-03:00 | Frías (yellow card) 48'; Guilherme 60'; Escobar (yellow card) 80'; Brazão (yellow card) 90+9' | Report | (yellow card) 45+4' Rodriguinho; (yellow card) 90' Luciano; (yellow card) 90+8' Rigoni | Stadium: Vila Belmiro; Attendance: 12,107; Referee: Rodrigo José Pereira de Lima |

| 28 September 25 | Red Bull Bragantino | 2–2 | Santos | Bragança Paulista |
| 18:30 UTC-03:00 | Lucas Barbosa 30'; Sasha (yellow card) 64'; Jhon Jhon (yellow card) 67'; Pedro Henrique 77'; Fabinho (yellow card) 90+2' | Report | (yellow card) 11' Souza; 56' Lautaro Díaz; 60' Barreal; (yellow card) 73' Mayke | Stadium: Estádio Cícero de Souza Marques; Attendance: 5,744; Referee: Flávio Rodrigues de Souza |

| 1 October 26 | Santos | 1–1 | Grêmio | Santos |
| 21:30 UTC-03:00 | João Schmidt (yellow card) 17'; Lautaro Díaz 89'; Escobar (yellow card) 72'; Igor Vinícius (yellow card) 77' | Report | (yellow card) 37' Arthur; (yellow card) 51' Alysson; 56' Edenilson; (yellow card) 82' Alex Santana | Stadium: Vila Belmiro; Attendance: 9,306; Referee: Paulo César Zanovelli da Silva |

| 5 October 27 | Ceará | 3–0 | Santos | Fortaleza |
| 20:30 UTC-03:00 | Lucas Mugni 10'; Lourenço (yellow card) 37'; Pedro Henrique 66'; Fernando Sobral 90+4' | Report | (yellow card) 39' Rollheiser; (yellow card) 55' Igor Vinícius; (yellow card) 85' Tiquinho Soares | Stadium: Arena Castelão; Attendance: 25,636; Referee: Anderson Daronco |

| 15 October 28 | Santos | 3–1 | Corinthians | Santos |
| 21:30 UTC-03:00 | Zé Rafael 4'; Barreal (yellow card) 6', (goal) 39'; Rollheiser 55' (pen.); Lautaro Díaz (yellow card) 59'; João Schmidt (yellow card) 62' | Report | (yellow card) 27' Maycon; (yellow card) 44' Matheuzinho; (yellow card) 54' Bidon; 58' Raniele; (yellow card) 70' Garro; (yellow card) 88' Gustavo Henrique | Stadium: Vila Belmiro; Attendance: 13,123; Referee: Flávio Rodrigues de Souza |

| 20 October 29 | Santos | 0–1 | Vitória | Santos |
| 21:30 UTC-03:00 | Escobar (yellow card) 45+4'; Zé Rafael (yellow card) 83' | Report | 41' (pen.) Matheuzinho; (yellow card) 45+1' Edu; (yellow card) 45+5' Renzo López; (yellow card) 57' Cáceres; (yellow card) 78' Willian Oliveira | Stadium: Vila Belmiro; Attendance: 11,775; Referee: Rafael Rodrigo Klein |

| 26 October 30 | Botafogo | 2–2 | Santos | Rio de Janeiro |
| 16:00 UTC-03:00 | Correa 1', 39'; Chris Ramos (yellow card) 53'; Marlon Freitas (yellow card) 62'; Allan (yellow card) 88'; Barboza (yellow card) 90+6' | Report | 26', (yellow card) 45+6' Souza; (yellow card) 38' Duarte; (yellow card) 40' Brazão; 70' (pen.) Barreal; (yellow card) 90+2' Luan Peres | Stadium: Estádio Nilton Santos; Attendance: 20,533; Referee: Rodrigo José Pereira de Lima |

| 1 November 31 | Santos | 1–1 | Fortaleza | Santos |
| 16:00 UTC-03:00 | João Schmidt (yellow card) 18'; Lautaro Díaz (yellow card) 23'; Frías (yellow card) 39'; Luan Peres (yellow card) 43'; Bruno Pacheco 74' (o.g.) | Report | (yellow card) 7' Brítez; (yellow card) 32' Pochettino; 35' Bareiro | Stadium: Vila Belmiro; Attendance: 13,356; Referee: Anderson Daronco |

| 6 November 32 | Palmeiras | 2–0 | Santos | São Paulo |
| 21:30 UTC-03:00 | José López (yellow card) 52'; Vitor Roque 67', 80' | Report | (yellow card) 40' Zé Rafael; (yellow card) 45+1' Mayke | Stadium: Allianz Parque; Attendance: 41,167; Referee: Raphael Claus |

| 9 November 33 | Flamengo | 3–2 | Santos | Rio de Janeiro |
| 18:30 UTC-03:00 | Samuel Lino (yellow card) 30'; Léo Pereira 37'; Carrascal 51'; de Arrascaeta (yellow card) 76'; Bruno Henrique 81' | Report | (yellow card) 36' Neymar; (yellow card) 77' Zé Ivaldo; 89' Bontempo; 90+1' Lautaro Díaz | Stadium: Maracanã; Attendance: 69,612; Referee: Sávio Pereira Sampaio |

| 15 November 13 | Santos | 1–0 | Palmeiras | Santos |
| 21:00 UTC-03:00 | Zé Rafael (yellow card) 28'; Rollheiser 90+1' | Report | (yellow card) 11' Aníbal Moreno | Stadium: Vila Belmiro; Attendance: 14,651; Referee: Raphael Claus |

| 19 November 34 | Santos | 1–1 | Mirassol | Santos |
| 21:30 UTC-03:00 | Neymar 4'; Zé Ivaldo (yellow card) 74' | Report | 61' (pen.) Reinaldo; (yellow card) 85' Shaylon; (yellow card) 89' Neto Moura | Stadium: Vila Belmiro; Attendance: 14,317; Referee: Matheus Delgado Candançan |

| 24 November 35 | Internacional | 1–1 | Santos | Porto Alegre |
| 21:00 UTC-03:00 | Alan Patrick 20' | Report | (yellow card) 52' Mayke; 62' Barreal; (yellow card) 90+5' Thaciano | Stadium: Estádio Beira-Rio; Attendance: 37,429; Referee: Davi de Oliveira Lacerda |

| 28 November 36 | Santos | 3–0 | Sport | Santos |
| 21:30 UTC-03:00 | Neymar 25'; Lucas Kal 36' (o.g.); João Schmidt 67' | Report | (yellow card) 65' Adriel; (yellow card) 85' Aderlan | Stadium: Vila Belmiro; Attendance: 14,156; Referee: Felipe Fernandes de Lima |

| 3 December 37 | Juventude | 0–3 | Santos | Caxias do Sul |
| 19:30 UTC-03:00 | Rodrigo Sam (yellow card) 67'; Marcos Paulo (yellow card) 72' | Report | 56', 65', 73' (pen.) Neymar; (yellow card) 64' Souza; (yellow card) 79' Zé Rafael | Stadium: Estádio Alfredo Jaconi; Attendance: 15,343; Referee: Wilton Pereira Sampaio |

| 7 December 38 | Santos | 3–0 | Cruzeiro | Santos |
| 16:00 UTC-03:00 | Thaciano 26', 28', (yellow card) 28'; Guilherme (yellow card) 34'; João Schmidt 60' | Report | (yellow card) 55' Gabriel; (yellow card) 55' Rayan Lelis | Stadium: Vila Belmiro; Attendance: 15,068; Referee: Rodrigo José Pereira de Lima |

=== Copa do Brasil ===
==== Third round ====
| 1 May First leg | Santos | 1–1 | CRB | Santos |
| 18:00 UTC-03:00 | Rollheiser 45+1'; Zé Ivaldo (yellow card) 61'; Leo Godoy (yellow card) 79'; Escobar (red card) 90+9' | Report | (yellow card) 42' Segovia; 58', (yellow card) 61' Breno Herculano; (penalty missed) 90+6' David | Stadium: Vila Belmiro; Attendance: 10,350; Referee: Lucas Paulo Torezin |

| 22 May Second leg | CRB | 0–0 (1–1 agg.) (5–4 p) | Santos | Maceió |
| 21:30 UTC-03:00 | Lucas Kallyel (yellow card) 90+3' | Report | (yellow card) 54' Souza; (yellow card) 90+4' Zé Ivaldo | Stadium: Estádio Rei Pelé; Attendance: 15,174; Referee: Ramon Abatti Abel |
| | Penalties |
| | Higor Meritão (penalty scored); Fernando Henrique (penalty missed); Matheus Ribeiro (penalty scored); Segovia (penalty scored); Henri (penalty scored); Weverton (penalty scored) | | (penalty scored) Neymar; (penalty missed) Guilherme; (penalty scored) Rincón; (penalty scored) Tiquinho Soares; (penalty scored) Bontempo; (penalty missed) Zé Ivaldo |

== See also ==
- 2025 Santos FC (women) season
