= Souza (footballer, born 2006) =

Brazilian footballer (born 2006)

Personal information
- Full name: João Victor de Souza Menezes
- Date of birth: 16 June 2006 (age 20)
- Place of birth: Mauá, Brazil
- Height: 1.78 m (5 ft 10 in)
- Position: Left-back

Team information
- Current team: Porto (on loan from Tottenham Hotspur)
- Number: 33

Youth career
- Juventus-SP (futsal)
- 2016–2024: Santos

Senior career*
Years	Team	Apps	(Gls)
2024–2026	Santos	37	(1)
2026–	Tottenham Hotspur	4	(0)
2026–	→ Porto (loan)	0	(0)

International career
2023	Brazil U17	12	(0)
- * Club domestic league appearances and goals as of 23:20, 15 March 2026 (UTC)

João Victor de Souza Menezes (Brazilian Portuguese: [ʒuˈɐ̃w viˈkoʁ dʒi ˈso(w)za meˈnezis]; born 16 June 2006), commonly known as Souza, is a Brazilian footballer who plays as a left-back for Primeira Liga club Porto, on loan from Premier League club Tottenham Hotspur.

== Club career ==
=== Santos ===
Born in Mauá, São Paulo, Souza joined Santos' youth setup in 2016, aged nine, after playing for the futsal team of Juventus-SP. On 12 July 2022, he signed his first professional contract with the club, after agreeing to a three-year deal.

On 6 February 2024, Souza was registered in the first team squad for the 2024 Campeonato Paulista, after Kevyson's injury. He made his first team debut five days later, coming on as a second-half substitute for goalscorer Hayner in a 2–2 away draw against Mirassol.

Mainly a backup to Gonzalo Escobar, Souza played in eight Série B matches as the club achieved promotion back to the top tier as champions. On 28 November 2024, he renewed his contract until 2028.

In January 2025, Souza suffered an ankle injury, being sidelined for three months. Still a second-choice behind Escobar, he scored his first professional goal on 26 October, netting his side's first in a 2–2 away draw against Botafogo.

=== Tottenham Hotspur ===
On 22 January 2026, Souza joined Premier League side Tottenham Hotspur on a long-term contract for a rumoured fee of £13 million. Souza made his debut for Spurs on 7 February 2026, coming on as a substitute in the 2–0 away loss to Manchester United. He made his first start for the club on 5 March, against Crystal Palace.

==== Loan to Porto ====
On 1 September 2026, Souza was loaned to Primeira Liga club Porto for the remainder of the season, without an option to buy.

== International career ==
In September 2022, Souza was called up to the Brazil national under-17 team for a training period aiming at the 2023 South American U-17 Championship, and he was included in the 23-man squad on 8 March 2023. A regular starter as the nation lifted the trophy, he was also called up to the 2023 FIFA U-17 World Cup, playing in four of Brazil's five matches in the competition.

On 17 May 2024, Souza and Santos teammates JP Chermont and Jair were called up to the Brazil national under-20 team for a period of training.

== Career statistics ==
As of match played 15 March 2026

Appearances and goals by club, season and competition
Club	Season	League			State league (Note: Includes Campeonato Paulista)		National cup (Note: Includes Copa do Brasil)		League cup		Continental		Other		Total	
Club	Season	Division	Apps	Goals	Apps	Goals	Apps	Goals	Apps	Goals	Apps	Goals	Apps	Goals	Apps	Goals
Santos	2024	Série B	8	0	1	0	—		—		—		—		9	0
Santos	2025	Série A	24	1	4	0	1	0	—		—		—		29	1
Santos	Total		32	1	5	0	1	0	—		—		—		38	1
Tottenham Hotspur	2025–26	Premier League	4	0	—		—		—		0	0	—		4	0
Porto (loan)	2026–27	Primeira Liga	0	0	—		0	0	0	0	0	0	—		0	0
Career total			36	1	5	0	1	0	0	0	0	0	0	0	42	1

== Honours ==
Santos

- Campeonato Brasileiro Série B: 2024

Brazil U17

- South American U-17 Championship: 2023
