= Hayner =

Brazilian footballer (born 1995)

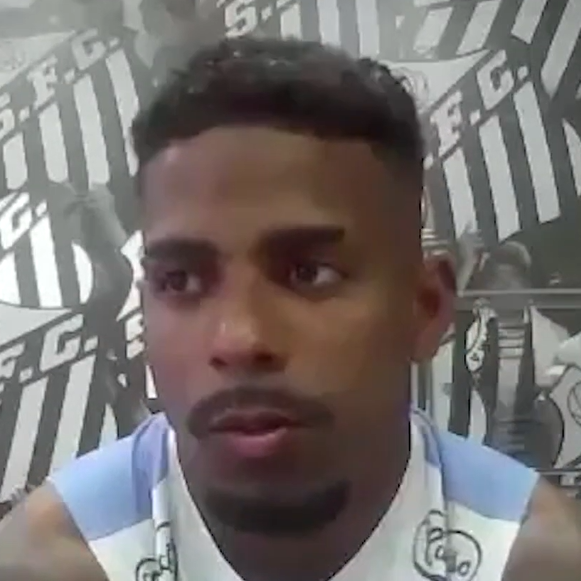
- Hayner in 2024

Personal information
- Full name: Hayner William Monjardim Cordeiro
- Date of birth: 2 October 1995 (age 31)
- Place of birth: Serra, Brazil
- Height: 1.78 m (5 ft 10 in)
- Position: Right-back

Team information
- Current team: Vila Nova (on loan from Santos)
- Number: 22

Youth career
- Rio Branco-ES
- 2015: Bahia

Senior career*
Years	Team	Apps	(Gls)
2014–2015	Rio Branco-ES	23	(1)
2015–2017	Bahia	18	(3)
2016	→ Náutico (loan)	1	(0)
2017	→ Paysandu (loan)	15	(0)
2018	Novorizontino	2	(0)
2018–2019	Louletano	29	(4)
2020–2021	Cuiabá	26	(0)
2021–2024	Azuriz	7	(0)
2021	→ Sport Recife (loan)	24	(0)
2022	→ Atlético Goianiense (loan)	23	(0)
2023	→ Dnipro-1 (loan)	15	(0)
2023	→ Coritiba (loan)	8	(0)
2024	→ Santos (loan)	36	(1)
2025–	Santos	2	(0)
2025	→ CRB (loan)	17	(0)
2026–	→ Vila Nova (loan)	14	(0)
- * Club domestic league appearances and goals as of 15:21, 19 May 2026 (UTC)

Hayner William Monjardim Cordeiro (born 2 October 1995), simply known as Hayner, is a Brazilian professional footballer who plays as a right back for Vila Nova, on loan from Santos.

== Career ==
=== Early career ===
Hayner was born in Serra, Espírito Santo, and was a youth product of local Rio Branco-ES. He made his first team debut with the club on 1 February 2014, coming on as a second-half substitute in a 2–0 Campeonato Capixaba Série B away loss to Atlético Itapemirim.

Mainly a backup during his first year, Hayner became a regular starter during the 2015 campaign as the club won the 2015 Campeonato Capixaba. He also scored his first senior goal during the competition, netting his team's second in a 2–1 home win over Vitória-ES on 7 February of that year.

=== Bahia ===
On 19 June 2015, Hayner was announced at Série B side Bahia, along with fellow Rio Branco teammate João Paulo; he was initially assigned to the under-20 squad. He made his debut for the club on 19 August, starting in a 1–0 home success over Sport Recife, for the year's Copa Sudamericana.

On 26 January 2016, Hayner renewed his contract with Bahia until May 2017, being definitely promoted to the main squad. He featured regularly during the 2016 Campeonato Baiano, and scored three goals during the competition.

==== Loan to Náutico ====
On 10 August 2016, after being separated from Bahia's first team squad by head coach Guto Ferreira, Hayner was loaned to fellow second division side Náutico until the end of the year. However, he only featured in one match for the club during his entire spell, playing only 45 minutes.

==== Loan to Paysandu ====
On 17 February 2017, Hayner was presented at Paysandu on loan for the season. A regular option during the Campeonato Paraense, he was mainly a backup option to Ayrton during the Série B.

=== Novorizontino ===
On 3 January 2018, Hayner was presented at Novorizontino, after his contract with Bahia expired. Also a backup option, he only played twice for the club.

=== Louletano ===
In August 2018, Hayner moved abroad and joined Campeonato de Portugal side Louletano. An immediate starter, he scored five goals during his spell at the club, as they finished ninth.

=== Cuiabá ===
Hayner returned to Brazil on 3 January 2020, after being announced at Cuiabá also in division two. On 18 June, after becoming a first-choice, he renewed his contract, and featured in 19 league matches as the club achieved their first-ever promotion to the Série A.

=== Azuriz ===
In January 2021, Hayner was named in the squad of Azuriz for their Campeonato Paranaense debut.

==== Loan to Sport Recife ====
On 18 May 2021, Hayner was announced on loan at Sport Recife in the top tier. He made his debut in the category twelve days later, starting in a 2–2 away draw against Internacional.

In December 2021, after Sport's relegation, Hayner left the club.

==== Loan to Atlético Goianiense ====
On 21 February 2022, Atlético Goianiense agreed the signing of Hayner for the season. A second-choice behind Dudu, he again suffered top tier relegation.

==== Loan to Dnipro-1 ====
In January 2023, Hayner moved abroad and joined Ukrainian Premier League side Dnipro-1.

==== Loan to Coritiba ====
On 2 August 2023, Hayner returned to his home country after joining Coritiba on loan. A backup to Natanael, he featured in only eight matches as the club also suffered relegation.

=== Santos ===
On 29 December 2023, Hayner was announced at Santos, also relegated to the second division, on a one-year loan deal. He made his debut for the club the following 20 January, replacing fellow debutant Aderlan in a 1–0 away win over Botafogo-SP.

Hayner scored his first goal for Peixe on 11 February 2024, netting the opener in a 2–2 away draw against Mirassol. Despite being named the best right-back of the 2024 Campeonato Paulista, he was often used in the other flank during the competition.

In April 2024, Santos reached an agreement with Azuriz for the permanent transfer of Hayner, paying R$ 1.7 million for 60% of his economic rights, with the deal being effective the following 1 January. However, he subsequently lost his starting spot on both sides: to youth prospect JP Chermont on the right, and to new signing Gonzalo Escobar on the left.

==== Loan to CRB ====
On 28 February 2025, after being separated from the first team squad at Santos, Hayner moved to CRB on loan.

==== Loan to Vila Nova ====
On 8 January 2026, Hayner agreed to join Vila Nova also in the second division on loan.

== Career statistics ==
As of 19 May 2026

Club	Season	League			State League		Cup		Continental		Other		Total	
Club	Season	Division	Apps	Goals	Apps	Goals	Apps	Goals	Apps	Goals	Apps	Goals	Apps	Goals
Rio Branco-ES	2014	Capixaba Série B	—		7	0	—		—		0	0	7	0
Rio Branco-ES	2015	Série D	0	0	16	1	—		—		—		16	1
Rio Branco-ES	Total		0	0	23	1	—		—		0	0	23	1
Bahia	2015	Série B	3	0	—		—		1 (Note: Appearance(s) in Copa Sudamericana)	0	—		4	0
Bahia	2016	Série B	6	0	9	3	2	0	—		5 (Note: Appearance(s) in Copa do Nordeste)	0	22	3
Bahia	Total		9	0	9	3	2	0	1	0	5	0	26	3
Náutico (loan)	2016	Série B	1	0	—		—		—		—		1	0
Paysandu (loan)	2017	Série B	7	0	8	0	2	0	—		5 (Note: Appearance(s) in Copa Verde)	1	22	1
Novorizontino	2018	Série D	0	0	2	0	—		—		—		2	0
Louletano	2018–19	Campeonato de Portugal	29	4	—		3	1	—		—		32	5
Cuiabá	2020	Série B	19	0	7	0	4	0	—		—		30	0
Azuriz	2021	Paranaense	—		7	0	—		—		—		7	0
Sport Recife (loan)	2021	Série A	24	0	—		—		—		—		24	0
Atlético Goianiense (loan)	2022	Série A	19	0	4	0	6	0	11	1	—		40	1
Dnipro-1 (loan)	2022–23	Ukrainian Premier League	15	0	—		0	0	2 (Note: Appearance(s) in UEFA Europa Conference League)	0	—		17	0
Coritiba (loan)	2023	Série A	8	0	—		—		—		—		8	0
Santos (loan)	2024	Série B	24	0	12	1	—		—		—		36	1
Santos	2025	Série A	0	0	2	0	0	0	—		—		2	0
Santos	Total		24	0	14	1	0	0	—		—		38	1
CRB (loan)	2025	Série B	17	0	—		—		—		3	0	20	0
Vila Nova (loan)	2026	Série B	8	0	6	0	3	0	—		1 (Note: Appearance(s) in Copa Centro-Oeste)	0	18	0
Career total			180	4	80	5	20	1	14	1	14	1	308	12

== Honours ==
Rio Branco-ES

- Campeonato Capixaba: 2015

Atlético Goianiense

- Campeonato Goiano: 2022

Santos

- Campeonato Brasileiro Série B: 2024

Individual

- Campeonato Paulista Team of the Year: 2024
