= Luisão (footballer, born 2003) =

Brazilian footballer

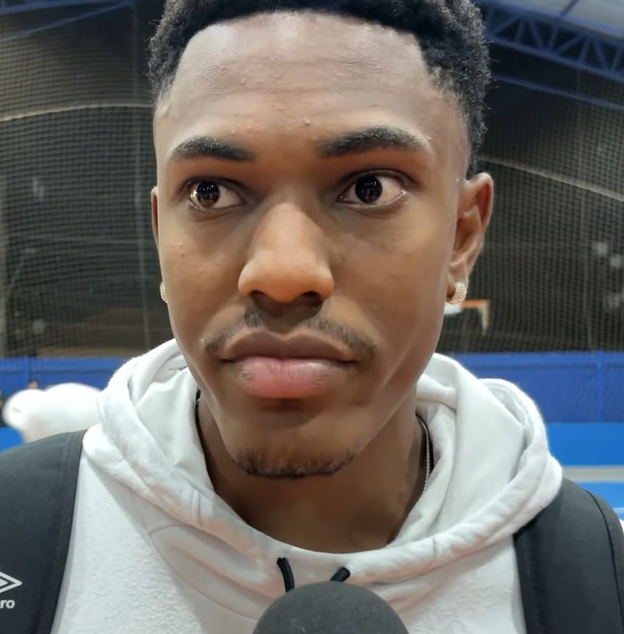
- Luisão in 2025

Personal information
- Full name: Luís Fellipe Campos Dória
- Date of birth: 9 September 2003 (age 23)
- Place of birth: Taboão da Serra, Brazil
- Height: 1.92 m (6 ft 4 in)
- Position: Centre-back

Team information
- Current team: Goiás (on loan from Santos)
- Number: 25

Youth career
- 2016: São Paulo
- 2017–2020: Audax
- 2021–2024: Novorizontino

Senior career*
Years	Team	Apps	(Gls)
2021–2024	Novorizontino	46	(3)
2021	→ Catanduva (loan)	8	(0)
2025–	Santos	9	(0)
2026–	→ Goiás (loan)	31	(2)
- * Club domestic league appearances and goals as of 17 November 2026

Luís Fellipe Campos Dória (born 9 September 2003), commonly known as Luisão, is a Brazilian professional footballer who plays as a centre-back for Goiás, on loan from Santos.

== Career ==
=== Novorizontino ===
Born in Taboão da Serra, São Paulo, Luisão joined Novorizontino's youth sides in 2021, after representing Audax and São Paulo.

==== Loan to Catanduva ====
In July 2021, without activities in the youth categories due to the COVID-19 pandemic, Luisão moved to Catanduva on loan for the year's Campeonato Paulista Segunda Divisão. He made his senior debut on 29 August 2021, coming on as a late substitute in a 1–0 home win over América-SP, and featured in further seven matches for the club, before returning to Novorizontino and their under-20 team for the 2022 season.

==== Breakthrough ====
Luisão made his first team debut with Tigre on 18 January 2023, starting in a 2–1 Campeonato Paulista Série A2 home win over Monte Azul. He later made his Série B debut on 30 April, replacing Ligger late into a 0–0 home draw against Sport Recife, but would feature mainly for the under-20 team during that year.

After playing in the 2024 Copa São Paulo de Futebol Júnior, Luisão was definitely promoted to the main squad and later became a starter in the 2024 Campeonato Paulista. He renewed his contract until 2027 in April 2024, and established himself in the starting eleven afterwards.

Luisão scored his first senior goal on 4 May 2024, netting his team's second in a 3–1 away win over Ituano.

=== Santos ===
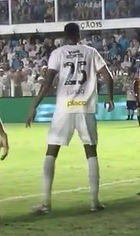
Luisão playing for Santos in 2025

On 11 January 2025, Santos announced the signing of Luisão on a four-year contract. He made his debut for the club fourteen days later, starting in a 2–1 away loss to Velo Clube.

A fourth-choice behind Zé Ivaldo, Gil and Luan Peres, Luisão would feature as a right-back in some matches under new head coach Cleber Xavier, but fell further down the pecking order after Xavier was sacked and after the arrival of Adonis Frías and Alexis Duarte.

==== Loan to Goiás ====
On 24 December 2025, Luisão was loaned to Goiás in the second division, for one year.

== Career statistics ==
As of 19 May 2026

Club	Season	League			State League		Cup		Continental		Other		Total	
Club	Season	Division	Apps	Goals	Apps	Goals	Apps	Goals	Apps	Goals	Apps	Goals	Apps	Goals
Catanduva	2021	Paulista 2ª Divisão	—		8	0	—		—		—		8	0
Novorizontino	2023	Série B	2	0	6	0	—		—		—		8	0
Novorizontino	2024	Série B	32	3	9	0	—		—		—		41	3
Novorizontino	Total		34	3	15	0	—		—		—		49	3
Santos	2025	Série A	6	0	3	0	0	0	—		—		9	0
Goiás	2026	Série B	7	0	12	2	3	0	—		0	0	22	2
Career total			47	3	38	2	3	0	0	0	0	0	88	5

== Honours ==
Goiás

- Campeonato Goiano: 2026
