= Gabriel Bontempo =

Brazilian footballer

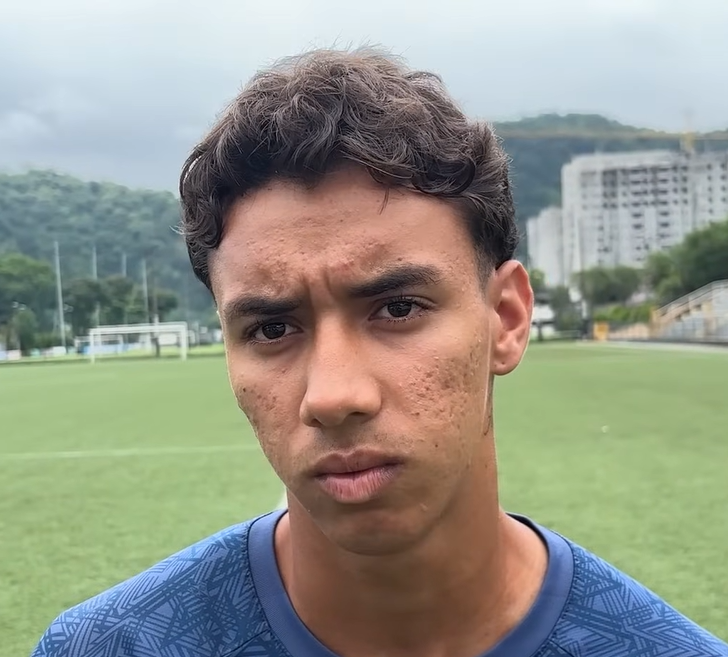
- Bontempo in 2024

Personal information
- Full name: Gabriel Morais Silva Bontempo
- Date of birth: 16 January 2005 (age 21)
- Place of birth: Uberaba, Brazil
- Height: 1.81 m (5 ft 11 in)
- Position: Attacking midfielder

Team information
- Current team: Santos
- Number: 8

Youth career
- 2016–2025: Santos

Senior career*
Years	Team	Apps	(Gls)
2025–	Santos	69	(4)

International career^{‡}
2026–	Brazil	3	(0)
- * Club domestic league appearances and goals as of 17:24, 19 November 2026 (UTC) ‡ National team caps and goals as of 17:24, 19 November 2026 (UTC)

Gabriel Morais Silva Bontempo (born 16 January 2005), known as Gabriel Bontempo, is a Brazilian footballer who plays for Santos and the Brazil national team. Mainly an attacking midfielder, he can also play as a winger or a central midfielder.

== Club career ==
Born in Uberaba, Minas Gerais, Bontempo joined Santos' youth setup in 2016, after a trial in his hometown. On 8 July 2022, he signed his first professional contract with the club, after agreeing to a three-year deal.

On 30 June 2024, Bontempo was registered with the first team squad for the 2024 Série B. On 13 October, he renewed his link with the club until December 2026.

Bontempo made his first team debut on 25 January 2025, starting in a 2–1 Campeonato Paulista away loss to Velo Clube. He scored his first professional goal seven days later, netting his team's second in a 3–1 home win over São Paulo.

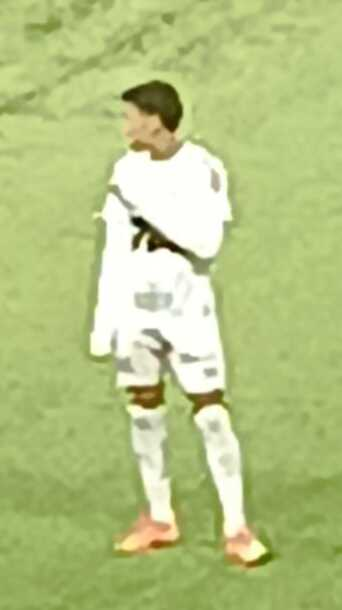
Bontempo playing for Santos in 2025

On 4 February 2025, Santos announced Bontempo's contract renewal until the end of 2027. On 5 May, he further extended his link until 2028.

Regularly used under head coach Pedro Caixinha, Bontempo lost space under Cleber Xavier, and also saw limited playing time under Juan Pablo Vojvoda, mainly due to an injury. He ended his first senior season with three goals in 37 appearances. After being out of the first five matches of the 2026 season due to a surgery in the nasal septum, he subsequently managed to become a starter under Vojvoda.

On 13 April 2026, Bontempo renewed his contract until December 2030.

== International career ==
On 22 July 2025, Bontempo and Santos teammate Luca Meirelles were called up to the Brazil national under-20 team for two friendlies against Paraguay. On 9 September 2026, he was called up to the full side by Carlo Ancelotti for two friendlies against Australia and India, and made his full international debut 20 days later, starting and providing an assist to Vanderson's opener in a 4–2 win over Australia.

== Career statistics ==
=== Club ===
As of 19 November 2026.

Club	Season	League			State League		Cup		Continental		Other		Total	
Club	Season	Division	Apps	Goals	Apps	Goals	Apps	Goals	Apps	Goals	Apps	Goals	Apps	Goals
Santos	2025	Série A	25	2	11	1	1	0	—		—		37	3
Santos	2026	Série A	30	0	3	1	6	1	11 (Note: Appearance(s) in Copa Sudamericana)	3	—		50	5
Career total			55	2	14	2	7	1	11	3	0	0	87	8

=== International ===
As of 19 November 2026

Appearances and goals by national team and year
National team	Year	Apps	Goals
Brazil	2026	3	0
Total		3	0
