= Hyan (footballer) =

Brazilian footballer

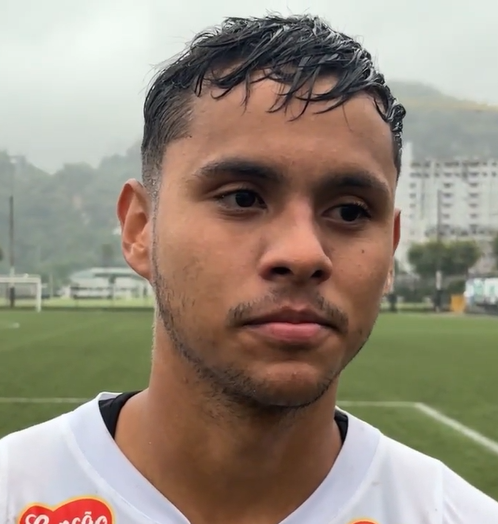
- Hyan in 2024

Personal information
- Full name: Hyan Carvalho Machado Silva
- Date of birth: 24 March 2004 (age 22)
- Place of birth: Brasília, Brazil
- Height: 1.84 m (6 ft 0 in)
- Position: Midfielder

Team information
- Current team: Avaí (on loan from Santos)
- Number: 18

Youth career
- 2015–2024: Santos

Senior career*
| Years | Team | Apps | (Gls) |
| 2024– | Santos | 3 | (0) |
| 2026– | → Avaí (loan) | 14 | (1) |
- * Club domestic league appearances and goals as of 18 November 2026

Hyan Carvalho Machado Silva (born 24 March 2004), simply known as Hyan, is a Brazilian footballer who plays as a midfielder for Avaí, on loan from Santos.

== Career ==
Born in Brasília, Federal District, Hyan joined Santos' youth setup in 2015, aged ten. On 24 August 2020, he signed his first professional contract with the club, after agreeing to a three-year deal.

On 25 January 2023, Hyan renewed his contract with Peixe until the end of 2025. On 21 February 2024, he was registered in the first team squad for the 2024 Campeonato Paulista.

Hyan made his first team debut on 5 July 2024, coming on as a second-half substitute for fellow youth graduate Sandry in a 1–0 Série B away win over Ceará. On 10 July of the following year, he further extended his link with the club until July 2027.

On 6 January 2026, after only featuring in two matches the previous campaign, Hyan agreed to join Avaí on loan.

== Career statistics ==
As of 22 September 2026.

| Club | Season | League | | | State League | | Cup | | Continental | | Other | | Total | |
| Club | Season | Division | Apps | Goals | Apps | Goals | Apps | Goals | Apps | Goals | Apps | Goals | Apps | Goals |
|---|---|---|---|---|---|---|---|---|---|---|---|---|---|---|
| Santos | 2024 | Série B | 1 | 0 | 0 | 0 | — | | — | | — | | 1 | 0 |
| Santos | 2025 | Série A | 2 | 0 | 0 | 0 | 0 | 0 | — | | — | | 2 | 0 |
| Santos | Total | | 3 | 0 | 0 | 0 | 0 | 0 | — | | — | | 3 | 0 |
| Avaí (loan) | 2026 | Série B | 5 | 0 | 5 | 0 | 0 | 0 | — | | 5 (Note: Appearance(s) in Copa Sul-Sudeste) | 0 | 15 | 0 |
| Career total | | | 8 | 0 | 5 | 0 | 0 | 0 | 0 | 0 | 5 | 0 | 18 | 0 |

== Honours ==
Santos

- Campeonato Brasileiro Série B: 2024
