= Jair Cunha =

Brazilian footballer (born 2005)

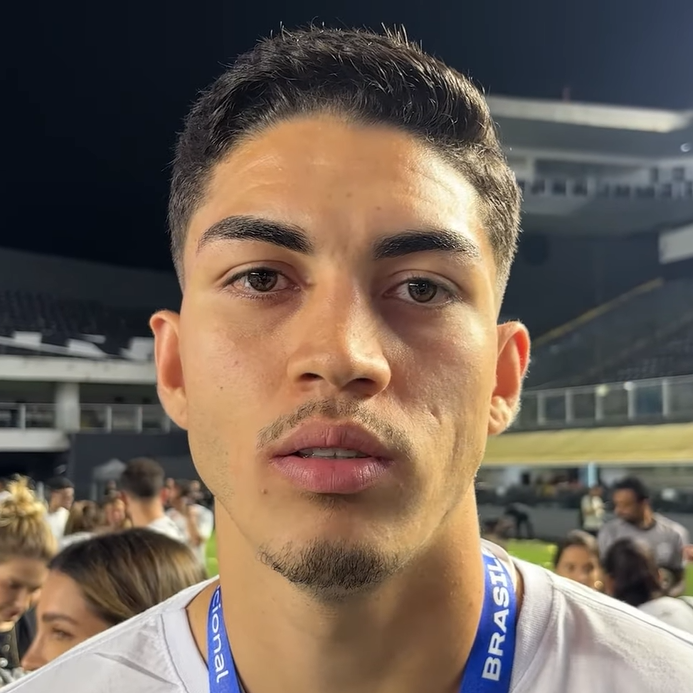
- Jair with Santos in 2024

Personal information
- Full name: Jair Paula da Cunha Filho
- Date of birth: 7 March 2005 (age 21)
- Place of birth: Orlândia, Brazil
- Height: 1.98 m (6 ft 6 in)
- Position: Centre-back

Team information
- Current team: Nottingham Forest
- Number: 23

Youth career
- 2016–2024: Santos

Senior career*
Years	Team	Apps	(Gls)
2023–2025	Santos	24	(0)
2025	Botafogo	12	(0)
2025–	Nottingham Forest	17	(1)

International career^{‡}
2024–2025	Brazil U20	8	(0)
2026–	Brazil	2	(0)
Medal record
Men's football
Representing Brazil
South American U-20 Championship
Winner	2025 Venezuela
- * Club domestic league appearances and goals as of 17:03, 7 November 2026 (UTC) ‡ National team caps and goals as of 23:34, 29 September 2026 (UTC)

Jair Paula da Cunha Filho (born 7 March 2005), known as Jair Cunha or just Jair, is a Brazilian professional footballer who plays as a central defender for Premier League club Nottingham Forest and the Brazil national team.

== Club career ==
=== Early career ===
Born in Orlândia, São Paulo, Jair joined Santos FC's youth setup in 2016, aged ten. During his first year at the club, he lived with teammate Gabriel Bontempo as his parents were unable to move to Santos.

On 19 June 2021, Jair signed his first professional contract with the club, agreeing to a deal until 2024. He was subsequently promoted to the under-20 team, quickly establishing himself as a starter in the category.

=== Santos ===
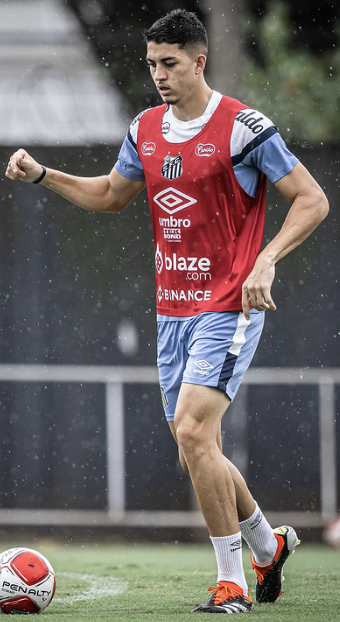
Jair training with Santos in 2024

On 22 June 2022, Jair renewed his link with Peixe until June 2025, and started to train with the first team squad in August. On 12 January of the following year, he suffered a knee injury while playing for the under-20s in the 2023 Copa São Paulo de Futebol Júnior.

Jair returned to trainings in August 2023, while entering the final stages of his recovery. He was declared fit to play in October, and made his professional – and Série A – debut on 9 November, coming on as a late substitute for fellow youth graduate Marcos Leonardo in a 1–0 away win over Goiás.

On 23 April 2024, after becoming an immediate backup to starters Gil and Joaquim, Jair renewed his contract with Santos until December 2026. In July, he became a regular starter after Joaquim left for Tigres UANL, and finished the year with 22 matches.

=== Botafogo ===
On 10 February 2025, Botafogo announced the signing of Jair on a four-year contract. He quickly established himself as a first-choice, and scored his first professional goal on 15 June, netting the opener in a 2–1 win over Seattle Sounders for the 2025 FIFA Club World Cup.

=== Nottingham Forest ===
On 11 July 2025, Jair signed a five-year deal with Premier League side Nottingham Forest for an undisclosed transfer fee. He made his debut abroad on 17 September, replacing compatriot Morato at half-time in a 3–2 EFL Cup loss to Swansea City.

Jair made his Premier League debut on 5 October 2025, starting in a 2–0 loss at Newcastle United, and finished the season with just nine league appearances, only seeing more playing time after the arrival of manager Vítor Pereira. At the start of the 2026–27 campaign, he became a starter under Oliver Glasner's 3-5-2 formation, along with compatriot Murillo.

== International career ==
On 17 May 2024, Jair and Santos teammates JP Chermont and Souza were called up to the Brazil national under-20 team for a period of training. On 20 December, he was included in the squad for the 2025 South American U-20 Championship.

On 9 September 2026, Jair was called up to the full side by Carlo Ancelotti for two friendlies against Australia and India. He made his full international debut sixteen days later, coming off the bench in a 1–1 draw against the former.

== Career statistics ==
=== Club ===
As of match played 7 November 2026

Appearances and goals by club, season and competition
Club	Season	League			State league (Note: Includes Campeonato Paulista, Campeonato Carioca)		National cup (Note: Includes FA Cup)		League cup (Note: Includes EFL Cup)		Continental		Other		Total	
Club	Season	Division	Apps	Goals	Apps	Goals	Apps	Goals	Apps	Goals	Apps	Goals	Apps	Goals	Apps	Goals
Santos	2023	Série A	2	0	0	0	0	0	—		0	0	—		2	0
Santos	2024	Série B	20	0	2	0	0	0	—		—		—		22	0
Santos	Total		22	0	2	0	0	0	—		0	0	—		24	0
Botafogo	2025	Série A	11	0	1	0	0	0	—		5 (Note: Appearances in Copa Libertadores)	0	5 (Note: One appearance in Recopa Sudamericana, four appearances and one goal in FIFA Club World Cup)	1	22	1
Nottingham Forest	2025–26	Premier League	9	0	—		1	0	1	0	4 (Note: Appearances in UEFA Europa League)	0	—		15	0
Nottingham Forest	2026–27	Premier League	8	1	—		0	0	1	0	—		—		9	1
Nottingham Forest	Total		17	1	—		1	0	2	0	4	0	—		24	1
Career total			50	1	3	0	1	0	2	0	9	0	5	1	70	2

=== International ===
As of 29 September 2026

Appearances and goals by national team and year
National team	Year	Apps	Goals
Brazil	2026	2	0
Total		2	0

== Honours ==
Santos

- Campeonato Brasileiro Série B: 2024

Brazil U20

- South American Youth Football Championship: 2025
