= Matheus Bachi =

Brazilian football coach

Personal information
- Full name: Matheus Rizzi Bachi
- Date of birth: 8 January 1989 (age 37)
- Place of birth: Caxias do Sul, Brazil
- Height: 6 ft 4 in (1.93 m)
- Position: Centre-back

Youth career
- Cruzeiro-RS

College career
Years	Team	Apps	(Gls)
2010	Cumberlands Patriots	19	(3)
2011–2013	Carson–Newman Eagles	54	(5)

Senior career*
Years	Team	Apps	(Gls)
2010	Três Passos		

Managerial career
- 2015: Caxias (assistant)
- 2015–2016: Corinthians (assistant)
- 2016–2022: Brazil (assistant)
- 2023–2024: Flamengo (assistant)
- 2025: Santos (assistant)
- 2025: Santos (interim)
- 2026: Cruzeiro (assistant)
- * Club domestic league appearances and goals

Matheus Rizzi Bachi (born 8 January 1989) is a Brazilian football coach and former player who played as a centre-back.

== Playing career ==
Born in Caxias do Sul, Rio Grande do Sul, Bachi played for Cruzeiro-RS as a youth. In January 2010, after a period of trainings at Al Ain, he signed for Três Passos.

Still in 2010, Bachi moved to the United States to study at the University of the Cumberlands, and played for their soccer side Cumberlands Patriots. In the following year, he moved to the Carson–Newman University and played for the Carson–Newman Eagles until 2013.

== Coaching career ==
After leaving the Carson-Newman University, Bachi joined his father in a sabbatical year before becoming an assistant of Paulo Turra at Caxias. After working in the 2015 Campeonato Gaúcho, he spent a period in Europe before joining his father's staff at Corinthians in September of that year.

Bachi followed Tite to the Brazil national team in June 2016, again as his assistant. He was a part of the staff which featured in the 2018 and 2022 editions of the FIFA World Cup, before departing the national side after the latter tournament.

In late 2022, Bachi expressed his desire to become a head coach. In October of the following year, he was again an assistant of his father at Flamengo.

Bachi left Fla in October 2024, after his father's dismissal. The following 29 April, he was named assistant of Cleber Xavier (also a former assistant of Tite) at Santos.

Bachi remained at Santos even after Xavier's dismissal on 17 August 2025, and became an interim head coach two days later. He coached the side on a 2–0 away loss to Bahia, before returning to the assistant role after the appointment of Juan Pablo Vojvoda.

On 16 December 2025, Bachi reunited with his father after being named his assistant at Cruzeiro. Both left on 15 March, when Tite was sacked.

== Personal life ==
Bachi's father Tite was also a footballer and a coach.

== Managerial statistics ==
As of 25 August 2025

Managerial record by team and tenure
Team	Nat.	From	To	Record								Ref
Team	Nat.	From	To	G	W	D	L	GF	GA	GD	Win %	Ref
Flamengo (interim) (Note: Interim head coach as Tite was absent due to an illness)	(Brazil)	25 August 2024	25 August 2024	1	1	0	0	2	1	+1	100.00	
Santos (interim)	(Brazil)	19 August 2025	24 August 2025	1	0	0	1	0	2	−2	0.00	
Career total	(Brazil)			2	1	0	1	2	3	−1	50.00	—
