= Aderlan =

Brazilian footballer (born 1990)

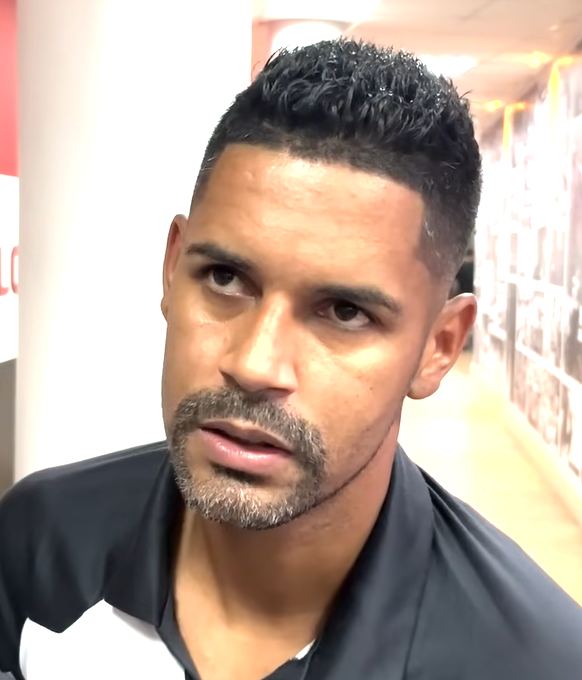
- Aderlan in 2024

Personal information
- Full name: Aderlan de Lima Silva
- Date of birth: 18 August 1990 (age 36)
- Place of birth: Campina Grande, Brazil
- Height: 1.80 m (5 ft 11 in)
- Position: Right-back

Team information
- Current team: Juventude
- Number: 13

Youth career
- Campinense

Senior career*
Years	Team	Apps	(Gls)
2009–2010	Campinense	12	(0)
2011	Joinville	0	(0)
2011–2012	Treze	15	(1)
2012	→ Itapipoca (loan)	13	(1)
2013	Corinthians Alagoano	18	(2)
2013	→ CSA (loan)	1	(0)
2014–2019	Santa Rita	18	(2)
2014–2016	→ Académica (loan)	40	(3)
2017	→ Luverdense (loan)	39	(1)
2018	→ América Mineiro (loan)	29	(0)
2019	→ Red Bull Brasil (loan)	16	(0)
2019–2023	Red Bull Bragantino	188	(5)
2024–2025	Santos	18	(0)
2025	Sport Recife	14	(0)
2026–	Juventude	24	(1)
- * Club domestic league appearances and goals as of 17 November 2026

Aderlan de Lima Silva (born 18 August 1990), simply known as Aderlan, is a Brazilian professional footballer who plays as a right back for Juventude.

== Career ==
=== Early career ===
Born in Campina Grande, Paraíba, Aderlan finished his formation with hometown club Campinense. He made his first team debut on 8 May 2009, coming on as a second-half substitute in a 2–1 Série B home loss against Duque de Caxias.

Aderlan scored his first senior goal on 20 September 2009, netting the game's only through a penalty in an away success over Queimadense, for the year's Copa Paraíba; in that competition, the club used a "B-team". In March 2011, after being sparingly used, he moved to Joinville, but never played a single match for the club.

In late 2011, Aderlan returned to his native state and joined Treze for the Copa Paraíba. The following January, he was loaned to Itapipoca, but returned to his parent club for the 2012 Série C, and was sold to an unnamed group of investors in October 2012.

On 10 January 2013, Aderlan agreed to a contract with Corinthians Alagoano. A regular starter, he was loaned to CSA for the 2013 Série D, but only featured in one match before having his federative rights assigned to Santa Rita, after the club merged with Corinthians for the 2014 season.

=== Académica ===
Aderlan moved abroad for the first time in his career on 4 June 2014, after agreeing to a two-year loan deal with Portuguese Primeira Liga side Académica de Coimbra. He made his debut abroad on 14 September, starting in a 1–0 away loss against Boavista FC, and scored his first goal on 2 November in a 1–1 home draw against SC Braga.

=== Luverdense ===
On 14 December 2016, Aderlan was announced at Luverdense in the second division. Initially a backup, he became a regular starter during the year's Série B, contributing with one goal in 32 appearances.

=== América Mineiro ===
On 10 January 2018, Aderlan signed for América Mineiro, still owned by Santa Rita. He made his top tier debut on 14 May, starting in a 2–2 away draw against Ceará, and finished the season as a first-choice as his team suffered relegation.

=== Red Bull Bragantino ===
On 11 January 2019, Aderlan joined Red Bull Brasil, and also moved to Bragantino when both sides merged in April. He was a regular starter in the club's promotion to the top tier, scoring once in 30 matches.

On 4 January 2021, Aderlan signed a new deal with Braga until May. He further extended his link until December 2022 on 5 April, and finished the campaign as a starter ahead of Weverton.

On 4 May 2022, still a first-choice, Aderlan agreed to a contract extension with Bragantino until December 2024. In the 2023 season, however, he lost his starting spot to Andrés Hurtado.

=== Santos ===
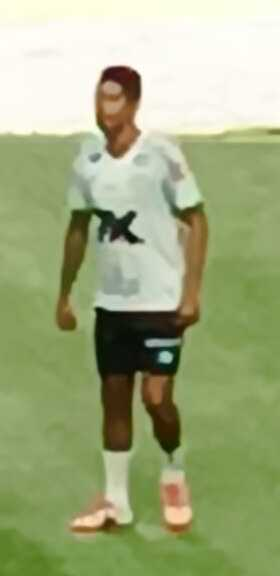
Aderlan warming up with Santos in 2025

On 27 December 2023, Aderlan was announced at Santos on a one-year contract. He made his debut for the club the following 20 January, starting in a 1–0 away win over Botafogo-SP.

A regular starter during the 2024 Campeonato Paulista, Aderlan subsequently lost his starting spot to youth graduate JP Chermont before suffering a knee injury in July which sidelined him for the remainder of the year.

=== Sport Recife ===
On 8 August 2025, Aderlan was announced at Sport Recife on a contract until the end of the year.

== Career statistics ==
As of 14 May 2025

Appearances and goals by club, season and competition
Club	Season	League			State League		Cup		Continental		Other		Total	
Club	Season	Division	Apps	Goals	Apps	Goals	Apps	Goals	Apps	Goals	Apps	Goals	Apps	Goals
Campinense	2009	Série B	4	0	1	0	—		—		3 (Note: Appearance(s) in Copa Paraíba)	1	8	1
Campinense	2010	Série C	0	0	7	0	—		—		—		7	0
Campinense	Total		4	0	8	0	—		—		3	1	15	1
Joinville	2011	Série C	0	0	0	0	—		—		—		0	0
Treze	2011	Série D	0	0	—		—		—		15	0	15	0
Treze	2012	Série C	15	1	—		—		—		—		15	1
Treze	Total		15	1	—		—		—		15	0	30	1
Itapipoca (loan)	2012	Cearense	—		13	1	—		—		—		13	1
Corinthians Alagoano	2013	Alagoano	—		18	2	—		—		—		18	2
CSA (loan)	2013	Série D	1	0	—		—		—		—		1	0
Santa Rita	2014	Alagoano	—		18	2	4	1	—		—		22	3
Académica (loan)	2014–15	Primeira Liga	15	3	—		0	0	—		1 (Note: Appearance(s) in Taça da Liga)	0	16	3
Académica (loan)	2015–16	Primeira Liga	25	0	—		2	0	—		—		27	0
Académica (loan)	Total		40	3	—		2	0	—		1	0	43	3
Luverdense (loan)	2017	Série B	32	1	7	0	4	0	—		4 (Note: Appearance(s) in Copa Verde)	0	47	1
América Mineiro (loan)	2018	Série A	23	0	6	0	2	0	—		—		31	0
Red Bull Brasil (loan)	2019	Paulista	—		16	0	—		—		—		16	0
Red Bull Bragantino	2019	Série B	30	1	—		—		—		—		30	1
Red Bull Bragantino	2020	Série A	34	0	14	0	2	0	—		—		50	0
Red Bull Bragantino	2021	Série A	29	2	7	1	4	0	13 (Note: Appearance(s) in Copa Sudamericana)	0	—		53	3
Red Bull Bragantino	2022	Série A	31	1	11	0	1	0	4 (Note: Appearance(s) in Copa Libertadores)	0	—		47	1
Red Bull Bragantino	2023	Série A	22	0	10	0	1	0	5	1	—		38	1
Red Bull Bragantino	Total		146	4	42	1	8	0	22	1	—		218	6
Santos	2024	Série B	4	0	12	0	—		—		—		16	0
Santos	2025	Série A	2	0	—		1	0	—		—		3	0
Santos	Total		6	0	12	0	1	0	—		—		19	0
Sport Recife	2025	Série A	0	0	—		—		—		—		0	0
Career total			267	10	140	6	21	1	22	1	23	1	473	17

== Honours ==
Santos

- Campeonato Brasileiro Série B: 2024
