= Kevyson =

Brazilian footballer

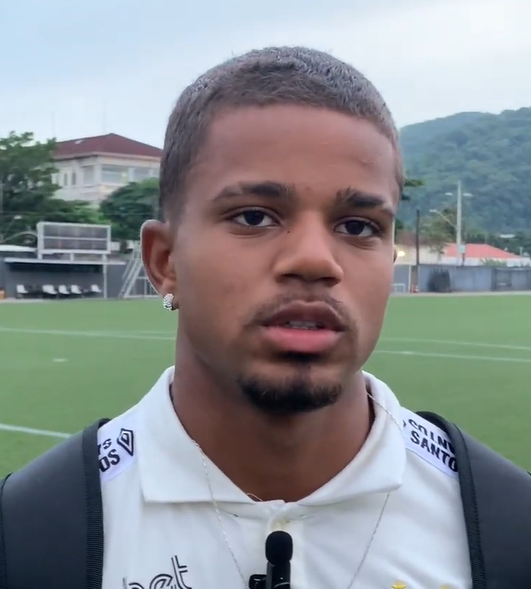
- Kevyson in 2023

Personal information
- Full name: Kevyson Costa e Silva
- Date of birth: 29 March 2004 (age 22)
- Place of birth: Leopoldina, Brazil
- Height: 1.74 m (5 ft 9 in)
- Position: Left-back

Team information
- Current team: Ponte Preta (on loan from Santos)

Youth career
- AMDH
- 2019: Figueirense
- 2019–2022: Athletico Paranaense
- 2022–2023: Santos

Senior career*
Years	Team	Apps	(Gls)
2023–	Santos	23	(0)
2025	→ Sport Recife (loan)	9	(0)
2026–	→ Ponte Preta (loan)	21	(0)
- * Club domestic league appearances and goals as of 7 August 2026

Kevyson Costa e Silva (born 29 March 2004), simply known as Kevyson is a Brazilian footballer who plays for Ponte Preta, on loan from Santos. Mainly a left-back, he can also play as a midfielder.

== Club career ==
=== Early career ===
Born in Leopoldina, Minas Gerais, Kevyson began his career with AMDH before signing for Figueirense in December 2018, after a trial period. Roughly one year later, he moved to Athletico Paranaense.

=== Santos ===
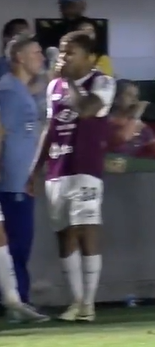
Kevyson with Santos in 2025

On 26 March 2022, Kevyson signed for Santos, being initially assigned to the under-20 squad. On 2 September, he renewed his contract with the club until December 2026.

Kevyson made his professional debut on 29 June 2023, starting in a 0–0 home draw against Blooming for the year's Copa Sudamericana, as both sides were already eliminated. He made his Série A debut three days later, coming on as a half-time substitute for Gabriel Inocêncio in a 3–0 away defeat to Cuiabá.

On 4 February 2024, after replacing Felipe Jonatan at half-time in a 2–0 Campeonato Paulista home win over Guarani, Kevyson was himself substituted off the field after just four minutes; it was later confirmed that he had suffered a knee injury, being sidelined for several months. He spent nine months sidelined, returning to action in November with the under-23 team.

On 25 April 2025, Kevyson renewed his contract until the end of 2027.

==== Loan to Sport Recife ====
On 11 July 2025, Kevyson was announced at fellow top tier side Sport Recife on loan until the end of the year.

==== Loan to Ponte Preta ====
On 28 January 2026, Kevyson was loaned to Ponte Preta until the end of the season.

== Career statistics ==
As of 19 May 2026

Club	Season	League			State League		Cup		Continental		Other		Total	
Club	Season	Division	Apps	Goals	Apps	Goals	Apps	Goals	Apps	Goals	Apps	Goals	Apps	Goals
Santos	2023	Série A	17	0	0	0	0	0	1 (Note: Appearance(s) in Copa Sudamericana)	0	—		18	0
Santos	2024	Série B	0	0	3	0	—		—		—		3	0
Santos	2025	Série A	1	0	2	0	0	0	—		—		3	0
Santos	Total		18	0	5	0	0	0	1	0	—		24	0
Sport Recife (loan)	2025	Série A	9	0	—		—		—		—		9	0
Ponte Preta (loan)	2026	Série B	6	0	3	0	2	0	—		—		11	0
Career total			33	0	8	0	2	0	1	0	0	0	44	0

== Honours ==
Santos

- Campeonato Brasileiro Série B: 2024
