= Pedro Malta =

Portuguese football coach

Personal information
- Full name: Pedro Gonçalo Fernandes Malta
- Date of birth: 20 May 1980 (age 46)
- Place of birth: Castelo Branco, Portugal

Senior career*
Years	Team	Apps	(Gls)
- Benfica Castelo Branco

Managerial career
- 2007–2009: Benfica Castelo Branco (youth)
- 2009–2011: Benfica Castelo Branco (assistant)
- 2010: Benfica Castelo Branco (interim)
- 2018–2019: Cruz Azul (assistant)
- 2020–2021: Al Shabab (assistant)
- 2022: Santos Laguna (assistant)
- 2022: Talleres (assistant)
- 2023–2024: Red Bull Bragantino (assistant)
- 2025: Santos (assistant)
- 2026: Juárez (assistant)
- * Club domestic league appearances and goals

Pedro Gonçalo Fernandes Malta (born 20 May 1980) is a Portuguese professional football coach.

== Career ==
Born in Castelo Branco, Malta played for local side Sport Benfica e Castelo Branco before retiring to pursue a coaching career. After working in the youth sides of CD Alcains and ARC Bairro do Valongo, he returned to his former side Benfica as a manager of the youth sides, later becoming a member of the first team staff.

After being an interim of Benfica Castelo Branco in a match against GD Águias do Moradal in December 2010, Malta enrolled at the University of Évora and met Pedro Caixinha, who was a teacher in the university at the time. After completing his specialisation, where he worked briefly with Caixinha at Sporting CP's scouting department, he was invited to join Caixinha's staff at UD Leiria, as a technical observer.

Malta continued to work under Caixinha as an observer at CD Nacional, and became a full member the technical staff as a fitness coach when the duo joined Liga MX side Santos Laguna. He continued to work with Caixinha under the same role at Al-Gharafa SC and Rangers FC, before officially becoming an assistant at Cruz Azul in 2018.

Malta moved with Caixinha to Al Shabab FC, back at Santos Laguna, Talleres de Córdoba and Red Bull Bragantino. He had his first professional experience as a head coach at the latter club, taking over in Bragantino's 2–1 away loss to Palmeiras on 20 June 2024, as Caixinha was suspended.

Malta left RB with Caixinha in October 2024, and followed the manager to Santos FC in December, also as an assistant. On 5 February 2025, he was on the bench as head coach of Peixe in a 1–1 Campeonato Paulista home draw against Botafogo-SP, a match that marked the return of Neymar to the club, as Caixinha was suspended.

On 14 April 2025, Malta left Santos after Caixinha was dismissed.

== Managerial statistics ==
As of 31 March 2025

Managerial record by team and tenure
Team	Nat	From	To	Record							
Team	Nat	From	To	G	W	D	L	GF	GA	GD	Win %
Benfica Castelo Branco	(Portugal)	12 December 2010	12 December 2010	1	0	1	0	2	2	+0	0.00
Red Bull Bragantino	(Brazil)	20 June 2024	20 June 2024	1	0	0	1	1	2	−1	0.00
Santos	(Brazil)	5 February 2025	5 February 2025	1	0	1	0	1	1	+0	0.00
Career total				3	0	2	1	4	5	−1	0.00
