= JP Chermont =

Brazilian footballer (born 2006)

- JP Chermont in 2025

Personal information
- Full name: João Pedro Chermont Crema
- Date of birth: 18 January 2006 (age 20)
- Place of birth: Bauru, Brazil
- Height: 1.81 m (5 ft 11 in)
- Position: Right-back

Team information
- Current team: Sharjah

Youth career
- 2017: Noroeste
- 2018–2026: Santos

Senior career*
Years	Team	Apps	(Gls)
2024–2026	Santos	50	(2)
2026	→ Coritiba (loan)	17	(0)
2026–	Sharjah	0	(0)

International career^{‡}
2023	Brazil U17	7	(0)
2025	Brazil U20	1	(0)
- * Club domestic league appearances and goals as of 22:16, 4 October 2026 (UTC) ‡ National team caps and goals as of 20:19, 27 July 2025 (UTC)

João Pedro Chermont Crema (born 18 January 2006), known as JP Chermont, is a Brazilian footballer who plays as a right-back for UAE Pro League club Sharjah.

== Club career ==
=== Santos ===
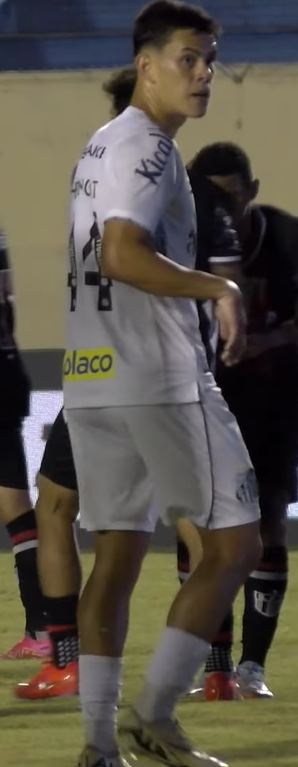
JP Chermont in action for Santos in 2024

==== Early career ====
Born in Bauru, São Paulo, JP Chermont joined Santos' youth setup in 2018, from hometown side Noroeste. On 21 November 2022, he signed his first professional contract with the club, after agreeing to a three-year deal.

==== 2024 season ====
On 21 February 2024, JP Chermont was registered in the first team squad for the 2024 Campeonato Paulista. He made his professional debut on 9 March, coming on as a second-half substitute for Felipe Jonatan in a 3–2 home win over Inter de Limeira.

JP Chermont scored his first professional goal on 26 April 2024, netting the opener in a 2–0 Série B away win over Avaí. On 27 June, he renewed his contract with the club until December 2027, and finished the 2024 season with two goals in 36 appearances overall, featuring more than Aderlan and Rodrigo Ferreira, as the club achieved promotion to the Série A as champions.

==== 2025 season ====
After starting the 2025 campaign as a first-choice ahead of new signing Leonardo Godoy, Chermont made his top tier debut on 30 March of that year, playing the full 90 minutes of a 2–1 away loss to Vasco da Gama, but lost his starting spot soon after. After the arrivals of Igor Vinícius and Mayke, he was demoted to third-choice and subsequently returned to play for the under-20 squad.

==== Loan to Coritiba ====
On 23 February 2026, after still remaining as a third-choice, Chermont was announced at fellow top tier side Coritiba on loan until the end of the year.

=== Sharjah ===
On 27 September 2026, Chermont was announced at Emirati side Sharjah, for a rumoured fee of US$ 3.5 million.

== International career ==
In September 2022, JP Chermont was called up to the Brazil national under-17 team for a training period aiming the 2023 South American U-17 Championship, which he was included in the 23-man squad on 8 March 2023. He was a regular starter as the nation lifted the trophy.

On 17 May 2024, Chermont and Santos teammates Jair and Souza were called up to the Brazil national under-20 team for a period of trainings. On 20 December, he was included in the squad for the 2025 South American U-20 Championship, but withdrew from the squad on 7 January 2025.

== Personal life ==
JP Chermont is a second cousin to former sports journalist Victorino Chermont, who died in the LaMia Flight 2933 crash in 2016.

== Career statistics ==
As of 19 May 2026.

Club	Season	League			State League		Cup		Continental		Other		Total	
Club	Season	Division	Apps	Goals	Apps	Goals	Apps	Goals	Apps	Goals	Apps	Goals	Apps	Goals
Santos	2024	Série B	31	2	5	0	—		—		—		36	2
Santos	2025	Série A	5	0	9	0	0	0	—		—		14	0
Santos	2026	Série A	0	0	0	0	0	0	—		—		0	0
Santos	Total		36	2	14	0	0	0	—		—		50	2
Coritiba (loan)	2026	Série A	17	0	—		0	0	—		—		17	0
Career total			53	2	14	0	0	0	0	0	0	0	67	2

== Honours ==
Santos U20

- Campeonato Paulista Sub-20: 2025

Santos

- Campeonato Brasileiro Série B: 2024

Brazil U17

- South American U-17 Championship: 2023
