= Gonzalo Escobar (footballer) =

Argentine footballer

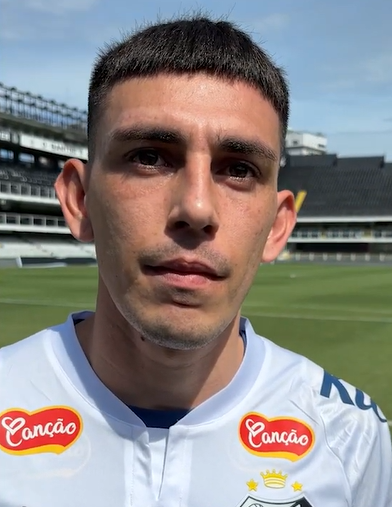
- Escobar in 2024

Personal information
- Full name: Gonzalo Daniel Escobar
- Date of birth: 16 March 1997 (age 29)
- Place of birth: Alejandro Korn, Argentina
- Height: 1.71 m (5 ft 7 in)
- Position: Left-back

Team information
- Current team: Santos
- Number: 31

Youth career
- El Rosedal
- SF Castelli
- 2003–2012: Banfield
- 2012–2016: Temperley

Senior career*
Years	Team	Apps	(Gls)
2016–2018	Temperley	39	(0)
2018–2021	Colón	62	(0)
2021–2023	Ibiza	44	(1)
2023–2024	Fortaleza	16	(0)
2024	→ Santos (loan)	33	(1)
2025–	Santos	71	(1)
- * Club domestic league appearances and goals as of 17:45, 13 October 2026 (UTC)

Gonzalo Daniel Escobar (born 16 March 1997) is an Argentine professional footballer who plays as a left-back for Brazilian club Santos.

== Career ==
=== Early career ===
Born in Alejandro Korn, Buenos Aires Province, Escobar was raised in the El Rosedal neighborhood, playing for local sides CDyS El Rosedal and SF JA Castelli before joining the youth sides of Banfield. In 2012, he moved to the youth setup of Temperley.

=== Temperley ===
Escobar made his professional – and Primera División – debut on 15 May 2016, starting in a 2–0 home win over Newell's Old Boys. He became a first-choice in the 2016–17 season, as the club again narrowly avoided relegation.

=== Colón ===
On 24 January 2018, Escobar signed a contract with Colón also in the top tier, as the club bought 65% of his economic rights for a fee of 10 million pesos (roughly US$ 500,000). He was mainly a first-choice ahead of Alex Vigo during his spell, with the club unsuccessfully attempting to renew his contract in 2020.

=== Ibiza ===
On 24 August 2021, Escobar joined newly promoted Segunda División side UD Ibiza on a two-year deal. He scored his first professional goal the following 22 January, netting his side's third in a 5–0 away routing of Málaga CF.

Escobar left Ibiza in June 2023, after the club's relegation.

=== Fortaleza ===
On 3 July 2023, Escobar was announced at Campeonato Brasileiro Série A side Fortaleza on a deal until December 2024. He made his debut for the club on 5 August, starting in a 1–0 away loss to Goiás, but spent the year as a backup to Bruno Pacheco.

In February 2024, Escobar was one of the players injured after supporters of Sport Recife threw rocks and bombs at Fortaleza's bus after a match between both clubs. He suffered traumatic brain injury, and returned to action in the following month.

=== Santos ===
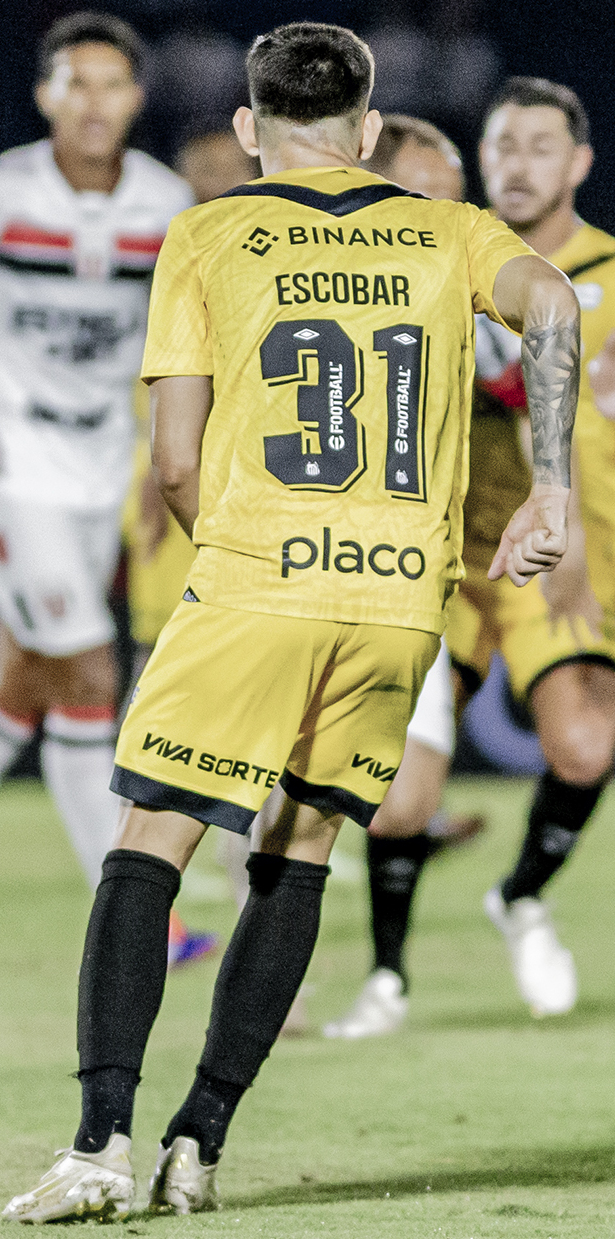
Escobar playing for Santos in 2024

On 19 April 2024, Santos announced the signing of Escobar on loan until the end of the year, with a subsequent permanent two-year contract already agreed. He made his debut for the club seven days later, starting in a 2–0 Série B away win over Avaí.

Escobar scored his first goal for Peixe on 21 August 2024, netting the opener in a 1–1 away draw against Guarani. He established himself as a starter as the club returned to the top tier as champions, and had his two-year deal activated in January 2025.

Escobar played his 100th match for Santos on 23 May 2026, in a 3–2 loss at Grêmio. On 31 July, he renewed his contract until the end of 2027.

== Career statistics ==
As of 13 October 2026.

Appearances and goals by club, season and competition
Club	Season	League			Cup (Note: Includes Copa Argentina, Copa del Rey and Copa do Brasil)		League cup (Note: Includes Copa de la Superliga)		Continental		State league (Note: Includes Campeonato Cearense, Campeonato Paulista)		Other		Total	
Club	Season	Division	Apps	Goals	Apps	Goals	Apps	Goals	Apps	Goals	Apps	Goals	Apps	Goals	Apps	Goals
Temperley	2016	Primera División	2	0	0	0	—		—		—		—		2	0
Temperley	2016–17	Primera División	26	0	2	0	—		—		—		—		28	0
Temperley	2017–18	Primera División	11	0	0	0	—		—		—		—		11	0
Temperley	Total		39	0	2	0	—		—		—		—		41	0
Colón	2017–18	Primera División	13	0	0	0	—		1 (Note: Appearance(s) in Copa Sudamericana)	0	—		—		14	0
Colón	2018–19	Primera División	16	0	1	0	2	0	7	0	—		—		26	0
Colón	2019–20	Primera División	13	0	2	0	—		6	0	—		—		21	0
Colón	2020–21	Primera División	8	0	2	0	—		—		—		—		10	0
Colón	2021	Primera División	11	0	0	0	—		—		—		—		11	0
Colón	Total		61	0	5	0	2	0	14	0	—		—		82	0
Ibiza	2021–22	Segunda División	21	1	2	0	—		—		—		—		23	1
Ibiza	2022–23	Segunda División	23	0	1	0	—		—		—		—		24	0
Ibiza	Total		44	1	3	0	—		—		—		—		47	1
Fortaleza	2023	Série A	13	0	—		—		0	0	—		—		13	0
Fortaleza	2024	Série A	0	0	0	0	—		1	0	3	0	4 (Note: Appearance(s) in Copa do Nordeste)	0	8	0
Fortaleza	Total		13	0	0	0	—		1	0	3	0	4	0	21	0
Santos	2024	Série B	33	1	—		—		—		—		—		33	1
Santos	2025	Série A	30	0	1	0	—		—		11	0	—		42	0
Santos	2026	Série A	23	0	6	0	—		9	0	7	1	—		45	1
Santos	Total		86	1	7	0	—		9	0	18	1	—		120	2
Career total			243	2	17	0	2	0	24	0	21	1	4	0	311	3

== Honours ==
Santos

- Campeonato Brasileiro Série B: 2024

Individual

- Campeonato Paulista Team of the year: 2025
