= Cleber Xavier =

Brazilian football coach

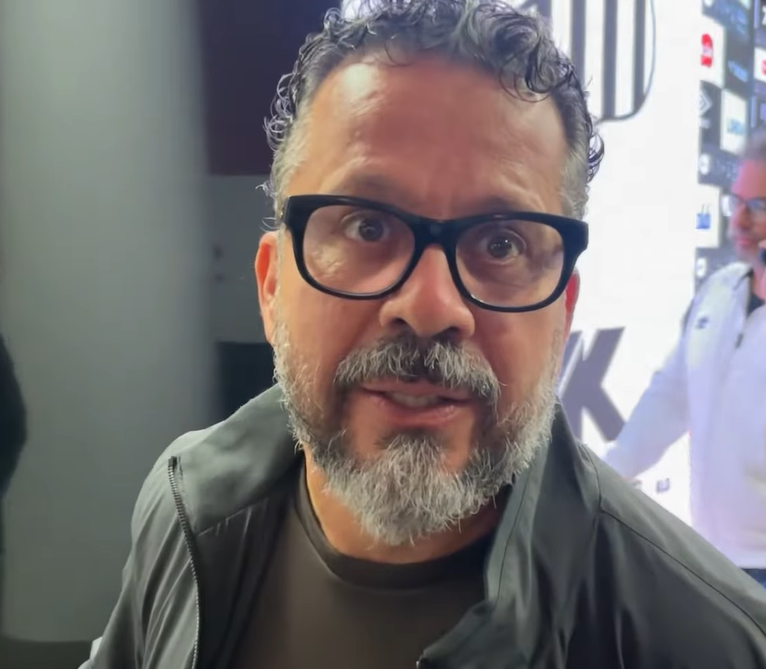
- Xavier in 2025

Personal information
- Full name: Cleber Márcio Serpa Xavier
- Date of birth: 29 March 1964 (age 62)
- Place of birth: Alegrete, Brazil

Team information
- Current team: Venezuela (assistant)

Managerial career
- Years: Team
- 1990–1995: Internacional (youth)
- 1995–1996: Bragantino (youth)
- 1996–2001: Grêmio (youth)
- 2001–2003: Grêmio (assistant)
- 2003: Grêmio (interim)
- 2003–2004: São Caetano (assistant)
- 2004–2005: Corinthians (assistant)
- 2005: Atlético Mineiro (assistant)
- 2006: Palmeiras (assistant)
- 2007: Al Ain (assistant)
- 2008–2009: Internacional (assistant)
- 2010: Bahia (assistant)
- 2010: Al Wahda (assistant)
- 2010–2013: Corinthians (assistant)
- 2015–2016: Corinthians (assistant)
- 2016–2022: Brazil (assistant)
- 2023–2024: Flamengo (assistant)
- 2025: Santos
- 2026–: Venezuela (assistant)

Cleber Márcio Serpa Xavier (born 29 March 1964) is a Brazilian football coach, currently the assistant coach of the Venezuela national team.

== Early life ==
Born in Alegrete, Rio Grande do Sul, Xavier only played for amateur sides in his hometown before retiring due to knee injuries. He then moved to Porto Alegre to study physical education, and started working in 1988 at Bráulio's football school named "Escolinha Garoto de Ouro".

== Career ==
=== Assistant ===
In 1990, Xavier started working in the youth categories of Internacional as a fitness coach and youth coach, after being recommended by Bráulio. He then coached the youth sides of Bragantino and Grêmio, before being promoted to the latter's first team in 2001, as an assistant coach; at that time, the club was also signing a new head coach, Tite.

In their first year of partnership, Xavier would help Tite by scouting their opponents in the 2001 Copa do Brasil, which the club won. He also had his first experience as a head coach on 27 September 2001; with the club already assured in the first position of their group in the 2001 Copa Mercosur, Tite opted to stay in Porto Alegre to prepare for a match against Santa Cruz, and Xavier led the side in a 1–1 away draw against Universidad de Chile.

In June 2003, Xavier became the interim head coach of Grêmio after Tite resigned, leading the side in a 3–1 home win over Fortaleza. After the arrival of Darío Pereyra as head coach, Xavier left the club and reunited with Tite as his assistant at São Caetano.

Xavier continued to work as Tite's assistant in the following years, representing Corinthians (three spells), Atlético Mineiro, Palmeiras, Al Ain and Internacional. In August 2010, with Tite unemployed, he became Márcio Araújo's assistant at Bahia, but only lasted 17 days in the role before rejoining Tite's staff at Al Wahda.

In June 2016, Xavier became one of the assistant coaches of the Brazil national team, after Tite was named head coach. He departed with Tite after the 2022 FIFA World Cup, and also worked alonsgide him at Flamengo before announcing the desire to become a head coach in October 2024.

=== Santos ===
On 29 April 2025, Xavier had his first experience as head coach, after being appointed at the helm of Santos on a contract until the end of the year. He made his debut at the helm of the club two days later, in a 1–1 home draw against CRB.

On 17 August 2025, Xavier was sacked from Peixe after a 6–0 home loss to Vasco da Gama.

=== Venezuela ===
On 20 January 2026, Xavier was presented as Oswaldo Vizcarrondo's assistant at the Venezuela national team.

== Managerial statistics ==
As of 17 August 2025

Managerial record by team and tenure
Team	Nat.	From	To	Record								Ref
Team	Nat.	From	To	G	W	D	L	GF	GA	GD	Win %	Ref
Grêmio (interim) (Note: Interim head coach as Tite opted to stay in Porto Alegre)	(Brazil)	27 September 2001	27 September 2001	1	0	1	0	1	1	+0	0.00	
Grêmio (interim)	(Brazil)	3 June 2003	8 June 2003	1	1	0	0	3	1	+2	100.00	
Santos	(Brazil)	29 April 2025	17 August 2025	15	5	4	6	14	21	−7	33.33	
Career total				17	6	5	6	18	23	−5	35.29	—
