= 2024 Santos FC season =

Santos
2024 season
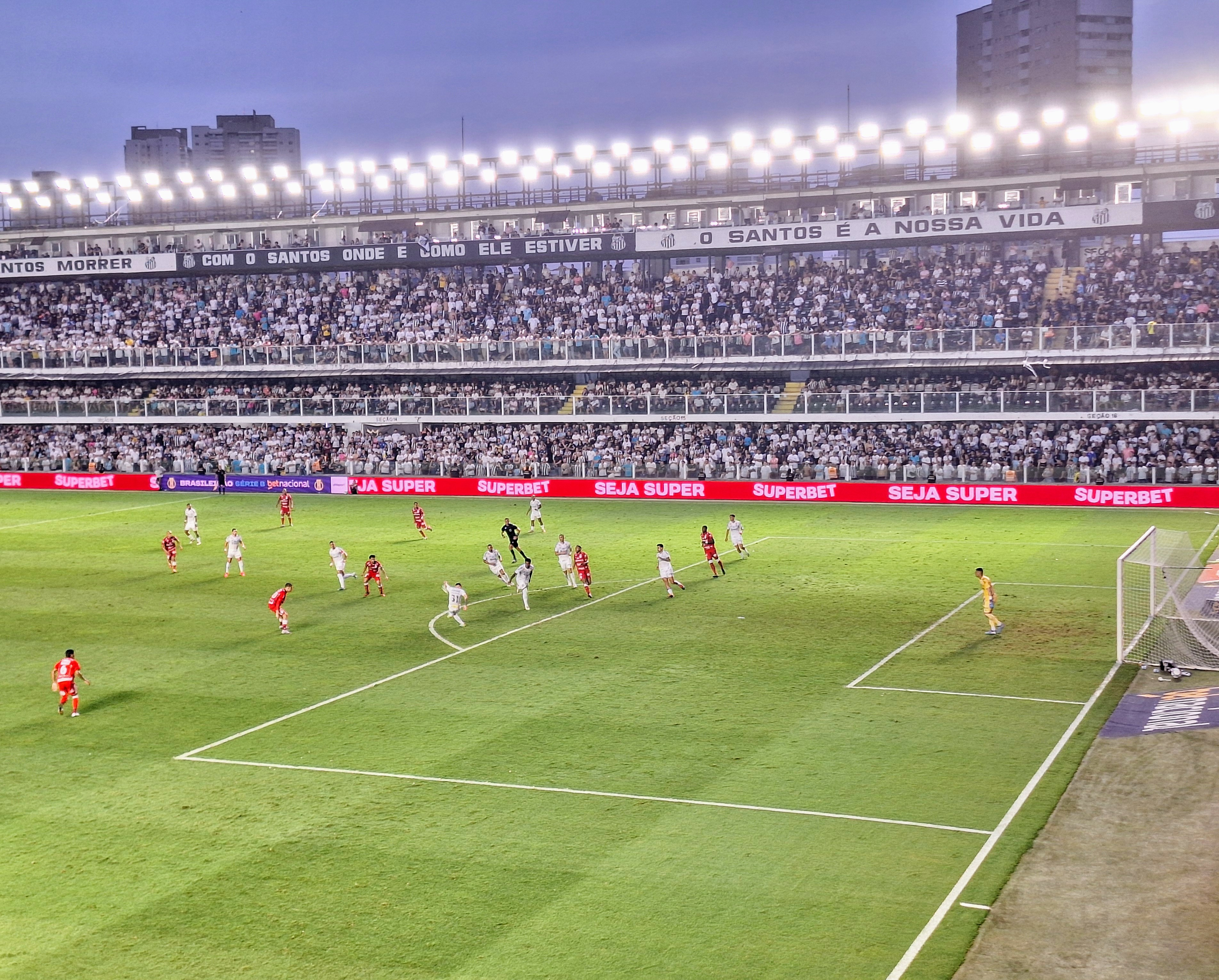
- Santos vs Vila Nova at the Vila Belmiro on 2 November
- President: Marcelo Teixeira
- Head coach: Fábio Carille (until 18 November); Leandro Zago (caretaker, 18 November – 24 November)
- Stadium: Vila Belmiro
- Série B: 1st (promoted)
- Campeonato Paulista: Runners-up
- Top goalscorer: League: Giuliano; Guilherme (9 each); All: Giuliano; Guilherme (12 each)
- Average home league attendance: 10,065
| Home colours | Away colours |

The 2024 season was Santos FC's 112th season in existence and the club's first season in the second division of Brazilian football, after suffering relegation in the previous season. As well as the Série B, the club competed in the Campeonato Paulista, and in the Equality Cup with a secondary squad.

On 9 December 2023, Marcelo Teixeira was elected the new president, returning to the role after 14 years.

== Players ==
=== Squad information ===
| N | Name | Pos. | Nat. | Place of birth | Date of birth (age) | Caps | Goals | Signed from | Date signed | Fee | Contract End |
Goalkeepers
| 1 | João Paulo | GK | (Brazil) | Dourados (Mato Grosso do Sul) | 29 June 1995 (aged 29) | 234 | 0 | Youth system | 26 February 2014 | Free | 31 December 2027 |
| 12 | Diógenes | GK | (Brazil) | Itapecerica da Serra (São Paulo (state)) | 6 January 2001 (aged 23) | 1 | 0 | Youth system | 9 July 2021 | Free | 31 December 2024 |
| 18 | Renan | GK | (Brazil) | Rio de Janeiro (Rio de Janeiro (state)) | 18 May 1989 (aged 35) | – | – | Sport Recife | 21 August 2024 | Free | 31 December 2024 |
| 34 | Gustavo Jundi | GK | (Brazil) | Araçatuba (São Paulo (state)) | 5 April 2004 (aged 20) | – | – | Youth system | 13 June 2024 | Loan | 31 January 2025 |
| 77 | Gabriel Brazão | GK | (Brazil) | Uberlândia (Minas Gerais) | 5 October 2000 (aged 24) | 31 | 0 | Inter Milan (Italy) | 21 February 2024 | Free | 31 December 2026 |
| — | João Pedro | GK | (Brazil) | Santos (São Paulo (state)) | 18 March 2008 (aged 16) | – | – | Youth system | 11 May 2024 | Free | 30 April 2027 |
| — | Rodrigo Falcão | GK | (Brazil) | Santos (São Paulo (state)) | 25 March 2005 (aged 19) | – | – | Youth system | 8 January 2024 | Free | 31 October 2024 |
Defenders
| 2 | Alex | CB | (Brazil) | Ribeirão Preto (São Paulo (state)) | 10 May 1999 (aged 25) | 34 | 1 | Fluminense | 7 May 2019 | Free | 31 December 2024 |
| 3 | Hayner | RB | (Brazil) | Serra (Espírito Santo) | 2 October 1995 (aged 29) | 35 | 1 | Azuriz | 29 December 2023 | Loan | 31 December 2024 |
| 4 | Gil | CB | (Brazil) | Campos dos Goytacazes (Rio de Janeiro (state)) | 12 June 1987 (aged 37) | 49 | 1 | Corinthians | 27 December 2023 | Free | 31 December 2024 |
| 13 | Aderlan | RB | (Brazil) | Campina Grande (Paraíba) | 18 August 1990 (aged 34) | 16 | 0 | Red Bull Bragantino | 27 December 2023 | Free | 31 December 2024 |
| 14 | Luan Peres | CB/LB | (Brazil) | São Paulo (São Paulo (state)) | 19 July 1994 (aged 30) | 95 | 1 | Fenerbahçe (Turkey) | 2 September 2024 | Free | 31 December 2027 |
| 15 | João Basso | CB | (Brazil) | Curitiba (Paraná (state)) | 13 January 1997 (aged 27) | 22 | 2 | Arouca (Portugal) | 1 August 2023 | Undisc. | 31 December 2026 |
| 29 | Rodrigo Ferreira | RB/LB | (Brazil) | Cotia (São Paulo (state)) | 29 March 1995 (aged 29) | 21 | 0 | Mirassol | 5 March 2024 | Undisc. | 31 December 2025 |
| 31 | Gonzalo Escobar | LB | (Argentina) | Alejandro Korn | 16 March 1997 (aged 27) | 33 | 1 | Fortaleza | 19 April 2024 | Loan | 31 December 2024 |
| 32 | Jair | CB | (Brazil) | Orlândia (São Paulo (state)) | 7 March 2005 (aged 19) | 24 | 0 | Youth system | 26 January 2022 | Free | 31 December 2026 |
| 33 | Souza | LB | (Brazil) | Mauá (São Paulo (state)) | 16 June 2006 (aged 18) | 9 | 0 | Youth system | 6 February 2024 | Free | 31 May 2025 |
| 38 | Kevyson | LB/AM | (Brazil) | Leopoldina (Minas Gerais) | 29 March 2004 (aged 20) | 20 | 0 | Youth system | 12 July 2022 | Free | 31 December 2026 |
| 40 | Samuel | CB | (Brazil) | Fortaleza (Ceará) | 9 February 2006 (aged 18) | – | – | Youth system | 25 January 2024 | Free | 30 June 2026 |
| 44 | JP Chermont | RB | (Brazil) | Bauru (São Paulo (state)) | 18 January 2006 (aged 18) | 36 | 2 | Youth system | 21 February 2024 | Free | 30 September 2025 |
| — | Diego Borges | CB | (Brazil) | Agudos (São Paulo (state)) | 15 December 2004 (aged 20) | – | – | Youth system | 27 January 2024 | Free | 31 January 2026 |
Midfielders
| 5 | João Schmidt | DM/CM | (Brazil) | São Paulo (São Paulo (state)) | 19 May 1993 (aged 31) | 49 | 1 | Kawasaki Frontale (Japan) | 30 December 2023 | Free | 31 December 2024 |
| 8 | Tomás Rincón | DM | (Venezuela) | San Cristóbal | 13 January 1988 (aged 36) | 44 | 2 | Free agent | 15 August 2023 | Free | 31 December 2024 |
| 20 | Giuliano | AM/CM | (Brazil) | Curitiba (Paraná (state)) | 31 May 1990 (aged 34) | 36 | 12 | Corinthians | 26 December 2023 | Free | 31 December 2024 |
| 21 | Diego Pituca | DM/CM | (Brazil) | Mogi Guaçu (São Paulo (state)) | 1 August 1992 (aged 32) | 205 | 13 | Kashima Antlers (Japan) | 31 December 2023 | Free | 31 December 2027 |
| 22 | Rómulo Otero | AM/RW | (Venezuela) | Caracas | 9 November 1992 (aged 32) | 51 | 8 | Aucas (Ecuador) | 29 December 2023 | Free | 31 December 2024 |
| 23 | Sandry | DM/CM | (Brazil) | Itabuna (Bahia) | 30 August 2002 (aged 22) | 106 | 0 | Youth system | 18 January 2019 | Free | 31 May 2026 |
| 25 | Alison | DM | (Brazil) | Cubatão (São Paulo (state)) | 1 March 1993 (aged 31) | 274 | 4 | Free agent | 9 February 2023 | Free | 31 December 2024 |
| 37 | Serginho | AM/LW | (Brazil) | Santos (São Paulo (state)) | 3 December 1990 (aged 34) | 20 | 2 | Maringá | 23 April 2024 | Loan | 31 December 2024 |
| 47 | Miguel Terceros | AM | (Bolivia) | Santa Cruz de la Sierra | 25 April 2004 (aged 20) | 14 | 0 | Youth system | 20 July 2022 | Free | 31 July 2027 |
| 66 | Ignacio Laquintana | AM | (Uruguay) | Paysandú | 1 February 1999 (aged 25) | 11 | 0 | Red Bull Bragantino | 1 September 2024 | Loan | 31 December 2024 |
| 88 | Patrick | AM/LW | (Brazil) | Rio de Janeiro (Rio de Janeiro (state)) | 29 July 1992 (aged 32) | 10 | 0 | Atlético Mineiro | 19 April 2024 | US$ 1M | 31 December 2026 |
| — | Hyan | CM | (Brazil) | Brasília (Federal District (Brazil)) | 24 March 2004 (aged 20) | 1 | 0 | Youth system | 21 February 2024 | Free | 31 December 2025 |
| — | Vinicius Balieiro | DM/RB | (Brazil) | Campinas (São Paulo (state)) | 28 May 1999 (aged 25) | 72 | 3 | Youth system | 13 November 2020 | Free | 31 December 2025 |
Forwards
| 7 | Pedrinho | LW/RW | (Brazil) | São Paulo (São Paulo (state)) | 10 November 1999 (aged 25) | 30 | 2 | Lokomotiv (Russia) | 11 January 2024 | Loan | 31 December 2024 |
| 9 | Julio Furch | ST | (Argentina) | Winifreda | 29 July 1989 (aged 35) | 63 | 9 | Atlas (Mexico) | 24 July 2023 | Free | 31 December 2025 |
| 11 | Guilherme | LW | (Brazil) | São Paulo (São Paulo (state)) | 13 April 1995 (aged 29) | 46 | 12 | Grêmio | 31 December 2023 | R$ 4.8M | 31 December 2026 |
| 17 | Yusupha Njie | FW | (The Gambia) | Banjul | 1 March 1994 (aged 30) | – | – | Al-Markhiya (Qatar) | 30 August 2024 | Loan | 30 June 2025 |
| 19 | Wendel Silva | ST | (Brazil) | Rio de Janeiro (Rio de Janeiro (state)) | 2 August 2000 (aged 24) | 16 | 4 | Porto (Portugal) | 16 August 2024 | Loan | 30 June 2025 |
| 27 | Willian | ST | (Brazil) | Três Fronteiras (São Paulo (state)) | 19 November 1986 (aged 38) | 39 | 7 | Fluminense | 28 December 2023 | Loan | 31 December 2024 |
| 43 | Mateus Xavier | LW/RW | (Brazil) | Ibicaraí (Bahia) | 29 June 2007 (aged 17) | 1 | 0 | Youth system | 30 June 2024 | Free | 31 August 2026 |
| 81 | Billy Arce | FW | (Ecuador) | Esmeraldas | 12 July 1998 (aged 26) | 2 | 0 | Once Caldas (Colombia) | 8 August 2024 | Free | 31 December 2025 |
| — | Enzo Monteiro | ST | (Bolivia) | Santa Cruz de la Sierra | 27 May 2004 (aged 20) | 1 | 0 | Youth system | 15 April 2024 | Free | 29 May 2027 |
| — | João Victor | RW | (Brazil) | Aparecida de Goiânia (Goiás) | 12 August 2007 (aged 17) | 0 | 0 | Youth system | 11 February 2024 | Free | 30 August 2026 |

Source: SantosFC.com.br (for appearances and goals) and FPF (for contracts). Players in italic were not registered for the Campeonato Brasileiro Série B.

Campeonato Paulista squad
- *Players in ~~strike~~ were replaced
- A List
- Note: Flags indicate national team as defined under FIFA eligibility rules; some limited exceptions apply. Players may hold more than one non-FIFA nationality.
  | No. | Pos. | Nation | Player |
  |---|---|---|---|
  | — | GK | BRA | Breno Sossai |
  | — | GK | BRA | Diógenes |
  | — | GK | BRA | Gabriel Brazão |
  | — | GK | BRA | João Paulo |
  | — | DF | BRA | Diego Borges |
  | — | DF | BRA | Gil |
  | — | DF | BRA | ~~João Basso~~ |
  | — | DF | BRA | Joaquim |
  | — | DF | BRA | Messias |
  | — | DF | BRA | Aderlan |
  | — | DF | BRA | Dodô |
  | — | DF | BRA | Felipe Jonatan |
  | — | DF | BRA | Hayner |
  | — | MF | BRA | Diego Pituca |
  | — | MF | BRA | João Schmidt |
  | No. | Pos. | Nation | Player |
  |---|---|---|---|
  | — | MF | VEN | Tomás Rincón |
  | — | MF | BRA | Vinicius Balieiro |
  | — | MF | BRA | ~~Vinicius Zanocelo~~ |
  | — | MF | BRA | Giuliano |
  | — | MF | ECU | Juan Cazares |
  | — | MF | BRA | Nonato |
  | — | MF | VEN | Rómulo Otero |
  | — | FW | COL | Alfredo Morelos |
  | — | FW | BRA | Bruno Marques |
  | — | FW | BRA | Guilherme |
  | — | FW | ARG | Julio Furch |
  | — | FW | BRA | Marcelinho |
  | — | FW | BRA | Pedrinho |
  | — | FW | BRA | ~~Willian~~ |
- B List
- Note: Flags indicate national team as defined under FIFA eligibility rules; some limited exceptions apply. Players may hold more than one non-FIFA nationality.
  | No. | Pos. | Nation | Player |
  |---|---|---|---|
  | — | GK | BRA | Rodrigo Falcão |
  | — | DF | BRA | Jair Cunha |
  | — | DF | BRA | Matheus Matias |
  | — | DF | BRA | Samuel |
  | — | DF | BRA | JP Chermont |
  | — | DF | BRA | Kevyson |
  | No. | Pos. | Nation | Player |
  |---|---|---|---|
  | — | DF | BRA | Souza |
  | — | MF | BRA | Hyan |
  | — | MF | BOL | Miguel Terceros |
  | — | FW | BOL | Enzo Monteiro |
  | — | FW | BRA | João Victor |
  | — | FW | BRA | Weslley Patati |

=== Appearances and goals ===
| No. | Pos. | Nat | Name | Campeonato Brasileiro Série B | | Campeonato Paulista | | Total | |
| No. | Pos. | Nat | Name | Apps | Goals | Apps | Goals | Apps | Goals |
|---|---|---|---|---|---|---|---|---|---|
| 1 | GK | (Brazil) | João Paulo | 7 | 0 | 16 | 0 | 23 | 0 |
| 77 | GK | (Brazil) | Gabriel Brazão | 30+1 | 0 | 0 | 0 | 31 | 0 |
| 12 | GK | (Brazil) | Diógenes | 1 | 0 | 0 | 0 | 1 | 0 |
| 4 | DF | (Brazil) | Gil | 1 | 16 | 0 | 50 | 1 | |
| 6 | DF | (Brazil) | Joaquim | 12 | 1 | 15 | 2 | 27 | 3 |
| 13 | DF | (Brazil) | Aderlan | 4 | 0 | 11+1 | 0 | 16 | 0 |
| — | DF | (Brazil) | Felipe Jonatan | 0 | 0 | 11+3 | 0 | 14 | 0 |
| 3 | DF | (Brazil) | Hayner | 10+14 | 0 | 7+4 | 1 | 35 | 1 |
| 38 | DF | (Brazil) | Kevyson | 0 | 0 | 1+2 | 0 | 3 | 0 |
| — | DF | (Brazil) | Messias | 0 | 0 | 1 | 0 | 1 | 0 |
| 29 | DF | (Brazil) | Rodrigo Ferreira | 5+16 | 0 | 0 | 0 | 21 | 0 |
| 33 | DF | (Brazil) | Souza | 3+6 | 0 | 0+1 | 0 | 10 | 0 |
| 32 | DF | (Brazil) | Jair | 19 | 0 | 0+3 | 0 | 22 | 0 |
| 44 | DF | (Brazil) | JP Chermont | 22+9 | 2 | 1+4 | 0 | 36 | 2 |
| 31 | DF | (Argentina) | Gonzalo Escobar | 33 | 1 | 0 | 0 | 33 | 1 |
| 2 | DF | (Brazil) | Alex | 1+4 | 0 | 0 | 0 | 5 | 0 |
| 15 | DF | (Brazil) | João Basso | 7+1 | 2 | 0 | 0 | 8 | 2 |
| 14 | DF | (Brazil) | Luan Peres | 3+2 | 1 | 0 | 0 | 5 | 1 |
| 21 | MF | (Brazil) | Diego Pituca | 34+1 | 4 | 15 | 1 | 50 | 5 |
| 20 | MF | (Brazil) | Giuliano | 29 | 9 | 5+2 | 3 | 36 | 12 |
| 5 | MF | (Brazil) | João Schmidt | 33 | 0 | 14+2 | 1 | 48 | 1 |
| 36 | MF | (Ecuador) | Juan Cazares | 0+3 | 0 | 7+4 | 1 | 14 | 1 |
| 22 | MF | (Venezuela) | Rómulo Otero | 27+10 | 5 | 10+4 | 3 | 51 | 8 |
| 8 | MF | (Venezuela) | Tomás Rincón | 3+11 | 0 | 3+11 | 0 | 28 | 0 |
| 15 | MF | (Brazil) | Nonato | 0+1 | 0 | 2+5 | 0 | 8 | 0 |
| 88 | MF | (Brazil) | Patrick | 0+10 | 0 | 0 | 0 | 10 | 0 |
| 37 | MF | (Brazil) | Serginho | 9+10 | 2 | 0 | 0 | 19 | 2 |
| 23 | MF | (Brazil) | Sandry | 6+7 | 0 | 0 | 0 | 13 | 0 |
| 14 | MF | (Brazil) | Hyan | 0+1 | 0 | 0 | 0 | 1 | 0 |
| 47 | MF | (Bolivia) | Miguel Terceros | 0+5 | 0 | 0 | 0 | 5 | 0 |
| 66 | MF | (Uruguay) | Ignacio Laquintana | 2+9 | 0 | 0 | 0 | 11 | 0 |
| 25 | MF | (Brazil) | Alison | 0+1 | 0 | 0 | 0 | 1 | 0 |
| 11 | FW | (Brazil) | Guilherme | 30+1 | 9 | 12+1 | 3 | 44 | 12 |
| 9 | FW | (Argentina) | Julio Furch | 12+15 | 3 | 8+5 | 3 | 41 | 6 |
| 7 | FW | (Brazil) | Pedrinho | 5+11 | 2 | 9+5 | 0 | 30 | 2 |
| 27 | FW | (Brazil) | Willian | 8+20 | 5 | 6+4 | 2 | 38 | 7 |
| — | FW | (Brazil) | Marcelinho | 0 | 0 | 1+4 | 0 | 5 | 0 |
| 30 | FW | (Colombia) | Alfredo Morelos | 4+2 | 2 | 4+7 | 2 | 17 | 4 |
| 42 | FW | (Brazil) | Weslley Patati | 7+6 | 2 | 0+6 | 0 | 19 | 2 |
| 18 | FW | (Bolivia) | Enzo Monteiro | 1 | 0 | 0 | 0 | 1 | 0 |
| 43 | FW | (Brazil) | Mateus Xavier | 0+1 | 0 | 0 | 0 | 1 | 0 |
| 30 | FW | (Colombia) | Alejandro Villarreal | 0+1 | 0 | 0 | 0 | 1 | 0 |
| 81 | FW | (Ecuador) | Billy Arce | 0+2 | 0 | 0 | 0 | 2 | 0 |
| 19 | FW | (Brazil) | Wendel Silva | 16 | 4 | 0 | 0 | 16 | 4 |
| 43 | FW | (Brazil) | Luca Meirelles | 0+2 | 0 | 0 | 0 | 2 | 0 |

Source: Match reports in Competitive matches, Soccerway

=== Goalscorers ===
| Ran | No. | Pos | Nat | Name | Série B | Paulista | Total |
|---|---|---|---|---|---|---|---|
| 1 | 20 | MF | (Brazil) | Giuliano | 9 | 3 | 12 |
| 1 | 11 | FW | (Brazil) | Guilherme | 9 | 3 | 12 |
| 3 | 22 | MF | (Venezuela) | Rómulo Otero | 5 | 3 | 8 |
| 4 | 27 | FW | (Brazil) | Willian | 5 | 2 | 7 |
| 5 | 9 | FW | (Argentina) | Julio Furch | 3 | 3 | 6 |
| 6 | 21 | MF | (Brazil) | Diego Pituca | 4 | 1 | 5 |
| 7 | 30 | FW | (Colombia) | Alfredo Morelos | 2 | 2 | 4 |
| 7 | 19 | FW | (Brazil) | Wendel Silva | 4 | 0 | 4 |
| 9 | 6 | DF | (Brazil) | Joaquim | 1 | 2 | 3 |
| 10 | 7 | FW | (Brazil) | Pedrinho | 2 | 0 | 2 |
| 10 | 42 | FW | (Brazil) | Weslley Patati | 2 | 0 | 2 |
| 10 | 44 | DF | (Brazil) | JP Chermont | 2 | 0 | 2 |
| 10 | 37 | MF | (Brazil) | Serginho | 2 | 0 | 2 |
| 10 | 15 | DF | (Brazil) | João Basso | 2 | 0 | 2 |
| 15 | 5 | MF | (Brazil) | João Schmidt | 0 | 1 | 1 |
| 15 | 3 | DF | (Brazil) | Hayner | 0 | 1 | 1 |
| 15 | 36 | MF | (Ecuador) | Juan Cazares | 0 | 1 | 1 |
| 15 | 4 | DF | (Brazil) | Gil | 1 | 0 | 1 |
| 15 | 31 | DF | (Argentina) | Gonzalo Escobar | 1 | 0 | 1 |
| 15 | 14 | DF | (Brazil) | Luan Peres | 1 | 0 | 1 |
| Own goals | | | | | 2 | 0 | 2 |
| Total | | | | | 57 | 22 | 79 |

Source: Match reports in Competitive matches

=== Disciplinary record ===
| N | Nat | Pos | Name | Série B | | | Paulista | | | Total | | |
| N | Nat | Pos | Name | Yellow card | (yellow card) (yellow-red card) | Red card | Yellow card | (yellow card) (yellow-red card) | Red card | Yellow card | (yellow card) (yellow-red card) | Red card |
|---|---|---|---|---|---|---|---|---|---|---|---|---|
| 77 | (Brazil) | GK | Gabriel Brazão | 3 | 0 | 0 | 0 | 0 | 0 | 3 | 0 | 0 |
| 6 | (Brazil) | DF | Joaquim | 1 | 0 | 0 | 3 | 0 | 0 | 4 | 0 | 0 |
| 3 | (Brazil) | DF | Hayner | 6 | 0 | 0 | 3 | 0 | 1 | 9 | 0 | 1 |
| 13 | (Brazil) | DF | Aderlan | 1 | 0 | 0 | 4 | 0 | 0 | 5 | 0 | 0 |
| 44 | (Brazil) | DF | JP Chermont | 5 | 0 | 0 | 1 | 0 | 0 | 6 | 0 | 0 |
| 4 | (Brazil) | DF | Gil | 3 | 0 | 0 | 1 | 0 | 0 | 4 | 0 | 0 |
| 31 | (Argentina) | DF | Gonzalo Escobar | 6 | 0 | 1 | 0 | 0 | 0 | 6 | 0 | 1 |
| 32 | (Brazil) | DF | Jair | 2 | 0 | 0 | 0 | 0 | 0 | 2 | 0 | 0 |
| 14 | (Brazil) | DF | Luan Peres | 1 | 0 | 0 | 0 | 0 | 0 | 1 | 0 | 0 |
| 29 | (Brazil) | DF | Rodrigo Ferreira | 2 | 0 | 0 | 0 | 0 | 0 | 2 | 0 | 0 |
| 15 | (Brazil) | DF | João Basso | 1 | 0 | 0 | 0 | 0 | 0 | 1 | 0 | 0 |
| 5 | (Brazil) | MF | João Schmidt | 8 | 0 | 0 | 3 | 0 | 0 | 11 | 0 | 0 |
| 21 | (Brazil) | MF | Diego Pituca | 4 | 1 | 0 | 2 | 0 | 0 | 6 | 1 | 0 |
| 8 | (Venezuela) | MF | Tomás Rincón | 2 | 0 | 0 | 1 | 0 | 0 | 3 | 0 | 0 |
| 22 | (Venezuela) | MF | Rómulo Otero | 4 | 0 | 0 | 3 | 0 | 1 | 7 | 0 | 1 |
| 36 | (Ecuador) | MF | Juan Cazares | 1 | 0 | 0 | 0 | 0 | 0 | 1 | 0 | 0 |
| 88 | (Brazil) | MF | Patrick | 1 | 0 | 0 | 0 | 0 | 0 | 1 | 0 | 0 |
| 20 | (Brazil) | MF | Giuliano | 2 | 0 | 0 | 0 | 0 | 0 | 2 | 0 | 0 |
| 23 | (Brazil) | MF | Sandry | 4 | 0 | 0 | 0 | 0 | 0 | 4 | 0 | 0 |
| 47 | (Bolivia) | MF | Miguel Terceros | 2 | 0 | 0 | 0 | 0 | 0 | 2 | 0 | 0 |
| 37 | (Brazil) | MF | Serginho | 2 | 0 | 0 | 0 | 0 | 0 | 2 | 0 | 0 |
| 11 | (Brazil) | FW | Guilherme | 2 | 0 | 0 | 1 | 0 | 0 | 3 | 0 | 0 |
| 7 | (Brazil) | FW | Pedrinho | 2 | 0 | 0 | 1 | 0 | 0 | 3 | 0 | 0 |
| 27 | (Brazil) | FW | Willian | 4 | 0 | 0 | 3 | 0 | 0 | 7 | 0 | 0 |
| 42 | (Brazil) | FW | Weslley Patati | 1 | 0 | 0 | 0 | 0 | 0 | 1 | 0 | 0 |
| 30 | (Colombia) | FW | Alfredo Morelos | 1 | 0 | 0 | 3 | 0 | 0 | 4 | 0 | 0 |
| — | (Brazil) | FW | Marcelinho | 0 | 0 | 0 | 1 | 0 | 0 | 1 | 0 | 0 |
| 19 | (Brazil) | FW | Wendel Silva | 2 | 0 | 0 | 0 | 0 | 0 | 2 | 0 | 0 |
| TOTALS | | | | 73 | 1 | 2 | 30 | 0 | 2 | 103 | 1 | 4 |

Source: Match reports in Competitive matches, Soccerway (yellow card) = Number of bookings; (yellow card) (yellow-red card) = Number of sending offs after a second yellow card; (red card) = Number of sending offs by a direct red card.

=== Suspensions served ===
| Date | Matches Missed | Player | Reason | Opponents Missed | Competition |
|---|---|---|---|---|---|
| 7 February | 1 | Joaquim | 3x (yellow card) | Mirassol (A) | Campeonato Paulista |
| 18 February | 1 | Hayner | 3x (yellow card) | São Bernardo (H) | Campeonato Paulista |
| 25 February | 1 | Rómulo Otero | 3x (yellow card) | Red Bull Bragantino (A) | Campeonato Paulista |
| 25 February | 1 | Willian | 3x (yellow card) | Red Bull Bragantino (A) | Campeonato Paulista |
| 17 March | 1 | Rómulo Otero | (red card) vs Portuguesa | Red Bull Bragantino (H) | Campeonato Paulista |
| 25 June | 1 | Gonzalo Escobar | 3x (yellow card) | Chapecoense (H) | Série B |
| 1 July | 1 | Willian | 3x (yellow card) | Ceará (A) | Série B |
| 1 July | 1 | João Schmidt | 3x (yellow card) | Ceará (A) | Série B |
| 5 July | 1 | Rodrigo Ferreira | (red card) vs Ceará | Ituano (H) | Série B |
| 21 August | 1 | JP Chermont | 3x (yellow card) | Amazonas (H) | Série B |
| 21 August | 1 | Hayner | 3x (yellow card) | Amazonas (H) | Série B |
| 24 August | 1 | Gonzalo Escobar | (red card) vs Amazonas | Ponte Preta (H) | Série B |
| 15 September | 1 | Rómulo Otero | 3x (yellow card) | Botafogo-SP (A) | Série B |
| 12 October | 1 | Gil | 3x (yellow card) | Chapecoense (A) | Série B |
| 12 October | 1 | Gonzalo Escobar | 3x (yellow card) | Chapecoense (A) | Série B |
| 12 October | 1 | Diego Pituca | (red card) vs Mirassol | Chapecoense (A) | Série B |
| 22 October | 1 | Gabriel Brazão | 3x (yellow card) | Ituano (A) | Série B |
| 2 November | 1 | Diego Pituca | 3x (yellow card) | Coritiba (A) | Série B |
| 11 November | 1 | Sandry | 3x (yellow card) | CRB (H) | Série B |

Source: Match reports in Competitive matches

== Coaches ==
| Name | Nat. | Place of birth | Date of birth (age) | Signed from | Date signed | Role | G | W | D | L | % | Departure | Manner | Contract end |
|---|---|---|---|---|---|---|---|---|---|---|---|---|---|---|
| Fábio Carille | (Brazil) | São Paulo (São Paulo (state)) | 26 September 1973 (age 53) | V-Varen Nagasaki (Japan) | 19 December 2023 | Permanent | 53 | 30 | 10 | 13 | 56.60 | 18 November 2024 | Mutual agreement | 31 December 2024 |
| Leandro Zago | (Brazil) | Campinas (São Paulo (state)) | 27 May 1981 (age 45) | Staff | 18 November 2024 | Interim | 1 | 0 | 0 | 1 | 0.00 | | | —N/a |

== Transfers ==
=== Transfers in ===
| N. | Pos. | Name | Age | Moving from | Type | Fee | Source |
|---|---|---|---|---|---|---|---|
| 20 | AM | (Brazil) Giuliano | 33 | (Brazil) Corinthians | Transfer | Free | |
| 13 | RB | (Brazil) Aderlan | 33 | (Brazil) Red Bull Bragantino | Transfer | Free | |
| 4 | CB | (Brazil) Gil | 36 | (Brazil) Corinthians | Transfer | Free | |
| 22 | AM | (Venezuela) Rómulo Otero | 31 | (Ecuador) Aucas | Transfer | Free | |
| 5 | DM | (Brazil) João Schmidt | 30 | (Japan) Kawasaki Frontale | Transfer | Free | |
| 21 | DM | (Brazil) Diego Pituca | 31 | (Japan) Kashima Antlers | Transfer | Free | |
| 11 | LW | (Brazil) Guilherme | 28 | (Brazil) Grêmio | Transfer | R$ 4.8M | |
| 36 | AM | (Ecuador) Juan Cazares | 31 | (Brazil) América Mineiro | Transfer | Free | |
| 15 | MF | (Brazil) Nonato | 25 | (Bulgaria) Ludogorets | Transfer | € 1.5M | |
| 77 | GK | (Brazil) Gabriel Brazão | 23 | (Italy) Inter Milan | Transfer | Free | |
| 29 | RB | (Brazil) Rodrigo Ferreira | 28 | (Brazil) Mirassol | Transfer | Free | |
| 88 | AM | (Brazil) Patrick | 31 | (Brazil) Atlético Mineiro | Transfer | US$ 1M | |
| 15 | CB | (Brazil) João Basso | 27 | (Portugal) Estoril | Loan return | Free | |
| 81 | FW | (Ecuador) Billy Arce | 26 | (Colombia) Once Caldas | Transfer | Free | |
| 18 | GK | (Brazil) Renan | 35 | (Brazil) Sport Recife | Transfer | Free | |
| 14 | CB | (Brazil) Luan Peres | 30 | (Turkey) Fenerbahçe | Transfer | Free | |

=== Loans in ===
| N. | Pos. | Name | Age | Loaned from | Loan expires | Fee | Source |
|---|---|---|---|---|---|---|---|
| — | LB | (Brazil) Jorge | 27 | (Brazil) Palmeiras | December 2024 | Free | |
| 27 | ST | (Brazil) Willian | 37 | (Brazil) Fluminense | December 2024 | Free | |
| 3 | RB | (Brazil) Hayner | 28 | (Brazil) Azuriz | December 2024 | Free | |
| — | RW | (Brazil) Marcelinho | 21 | (Brazil) Tombense | December 2024 | Free | |
| 7 | RW | (Brazil) Pedrinho | 24 | (Russia) Lokomotiv Moscow | December 2024 | Free | |
| 31 | LB | (Argentina) Gonzalo Escobar | 27 | (Brazil) Fortaleza | December 2024 | Free | |
| 37 | AM | (Brazil) Serginho | 33 | (Brazil) Maringá | December 2024 | Free | |
| 19 | ST | (Brazil) Wendel Silva | 24 | (Portugal) Porto | July 2025 | € 0.5M | |
| 66 | AM | (Uruguay) Ignacio Laquintana | 25 | (Brazil) Red Bull Bragantino | December 2024 | Free | |
| 17 | FW | (The Gambia) Yusupha Njie | 30 | (Qatar) Al-Markhiya | June 2025 | Free | |

=== Transfers out ===
| N. | Pos. | Name | Age | Moving to | Type | Fee | Source |
|---|---|---|---|---|---|---|---|
| 12 | RB | (Brazil) Gabriel Inocêncio | 29 | (Brazil) Água Santa | Loan return | Free | |
| 88 | ST | (Brazil) Bruno Mezenga | 35 | (Brazil) Água Santa | Loan return | Free | |
| 97 | AM | (Brazil) Luan Dias | 26 | (Brazil) Água Santa | Loan return | Free | |
| 19 | DM | (Brazil) Dodi | 27 | (Brazil) Grêmio | Transfer | US$ 1M | |
| 17 | SS | (Uruguay) Maximiliano Silvera | 26 | (Uruguay) Peñarol | Contract ended | Free | |
| 29 | DM | (Brazil) Camacho | 33 | (Brazil) Guarani | Contract ended | Free | |
| 80 | RB | (Brazil) Júnior Caiçara | 34 | (Brazil) Santo André | Contract ended | Free | |
| — | AM | (Brazil) Gabriel Pirani | 21 | (United States) D.C. United | Transfer | US$ 1.3M | |
| — | DM | (Brazil) Willian Maranhão | 28 | (Brazil) Avaí | Contract rescinded | Free | |
| — | GK | (Brazil) John | 27 | (Brazil) Botafogo | Transfer | € 1.5M | |
| 9 | ST | (Brazil) Marcos Leonardo | 20 | (Portugal) Benfica | Transfer | € 18M | |
| 8 | DM | (Brazil) Jean Lucas | 25 | (Brazil) Bahia | Transfer | R$ 24M | |
| — | LW | (Brazil) Allanzinho | 23 | (Romania) Politehnica Iași | Contract rescinded | Free | |
| — | FW | (Brazil) Rwan | 22 | (Bulgaria) Ludogorets | Transfer | € 1M | |
| — | AM | (Brazil) Lucas Lourenço | 23 | (Brazil) Cianorte | Contract rescinded | Free | |
| 20 | FW | (Colombia) Stiven Mendoza | 31 | (Turkey) Adana Demirspor | Contract rescinded | Free | |
| — | LB | (Brazil) Jorge | 27 | (Brazil) Palmeiras | Loan rescinded | Free | |
| — | FW | (Brazil) Marcelinho | 21 | (Brazil) Tombense | Loan rescinded | Free | |
| — | LB | (Brazil) Felipe Jonatan | 26 | (Brazil) Fortaleza | Contract rescinded | Free | |
| — | FW | (Brazil) Tailson | 25 | Free agent | Contract rescinded | Free | |
| — | MF | (Brazil) Ivonei | 22 | Free agent | Contract rescinded | Free | |
| — | RB | (Brazil) Cadu | 22 | Free agent | Contract rescinded | Free | |
| — | MF | (Argentina) Gabriel Carabajal | 32 | Free agent | Contract rescinded | Free | |
| 36 | AM | (Ecuador) Juan Cazares | 32 | (Brazil) Paysandu | Contract rescinded | Free | |
| — | LB | (Brazil) Lucas Pires | 23 | (England) Burnley | Transfer | £ 1.9M | |
| — | CB | (Bolivia) Leonardo Zabala | 21 | (Mexico) Cancún | Contract rescinded | Free | |
| 6 | CB | (Brazil) Joaquim | 25 | (Mexico) Tigres | Transfer | US$ 8M | |
| — | GK | (Brazil) Breno | 23 | (Brazil) Joinville | Contract ended | Free | |
| 42 | RW | (Brazil) Weslley Patati | 20 | (Israel) Maccabi Tel Aviv | Transfer | € 1.3M | |
| — | GK | (Brazil) Paulo Mazoti | 24 | Free agent | Contract rescinded | Free | |
| 16 | LB | (Brazil) Dodô | 32 | Free agent | Contract rescinded | Free | |

=== Loans out ===
| N. | P | Name | Age | Loaned to | Loan expires | Source |
|---|---|---|---|---|---|---|
| — | CM | (Brazil) Luiz Henrique | 24 | (Brazil) Ipatinga | October 2024 | |
| — | CB | (Brazil) Jhonnathan | 22 | (Brazil) Água Santa | April 2024 | |
| 10 | LW | (Venezuela) Yeferson Soteldo | 26 | (Brazil) Grêmio | December 2024 | |
| 30 | LW | (Brazil) Lucas Braga | 27 | (Japan) Shimizu S-Pulse | December 2024 | |
| — | AM | (Brazil) Lucas Barbosa | 22 | (Brazil) Juventude | December 2024 | |
| 13 | RB | (Brazil) João Lucas | 25 | (Brazil) Juventude | December 2024 | |
| 1 | GK | (Brazil) Vladimir | 34 | (Brazil) Guarani | December 2024 | |
| 14 | MF | (Uruguay) Rodrigo Fernández | 28 | (Argentina) Newell's Old Boys | December 2024 | |
| — | CB | (Brazil) Luiz Felipe | 30 | (Brazil) Atlético Goianiense | December 2024 | |
| — | MF | (Brazil) Vinicius Zanocelo | 23 | (Portugal) Estoril | December 2024 | |
| 2 | CB | (Brazil) João Basso | 27 | (Portugal) Estoril | December 2024 | |
| 23 | MF | (Brazil) Lucas Lima | 33 | (Brazil) Sport Recife | December 2024 | |
| — | GK | (Brazil) Breno | 23 | (Brazil) Paranavaí | July 2024 | |
| — | CB | (Brazil) Messias | 29 | (Brazil) Goiás | November 2024 | |
| — | AM | (Brazil) Ed Carlos | 23 | (Brazil) Betim | July 2024 | |
| — | CB | (Brazil) Jhonnathan | 23 | (Brazil) Chapecoense | November 2024 | |
| 15 | MF | (Brazil) Nonato | 26 | (Brazil) Fluminense | July 2025 | |
| 30 | ST | (Colombia) Alfredo Morelos | 28 | (Colombia) Atlético Nacional | December 2024 | |
| — | GK | (Brazil) Paulo Mazoti | 24 | (Brazil) São Caetano | October 2024 | |
| — | FW | (Brazil) Bruno Marques | 25 | (Brazil) Botafogo-SP | December 2024 | |
| — | RB | (Brazil) Nathan Santos | 22 | (Brazil) Internacional | June 2025 | |

== Competitions ==
=== Overview ===
| Competition | First match | Last match | Starting round | Final position | Record | | | | | | | |
| Competition | First match | Last match | Starting round | Final position | Pld | W | D | L | GF | GA | GD | Win % |
|---|---|---|---|---|---|---|---|---|---|---|---|---|
| Série B | 20 April 2024 | 24 November 2024 | Matchday 1 | Winners | 38 | 20 | 8 | 10 | 57 | 32 | +25 | 52.63 |
| Campeonato Paulista | 20 January 2024 | 7 April 2024 | Matchday 1 | Runners-up | 16 | 10 | 2 | 4 | 22 | 13 | +9 | 62.50 |
| Total | | | | | 54 | 30 | 10 | 14 | 79 | 45 | +34 | 55.56 |

Source: Competitions

=== Campeonato Paulista ===
==== Results summary ====
| Overall | | | | | | | | Home | | | | | | Away | | | | | |
| Pld | W | D | L | GF | GA | GD | Pts | W | D | L | GF | GA | GD | W | D | L | GF | GA | GD |
|---|---|---|---|---|---|---|---|---|---|---|---|---|---|---|---|---|---|---|---|
| 12 | 8 | 1 | 3 | 18 | 11 | +7 | 25 | 5 | 0 | 1 | 12 | 6 | +6 | 3 | 1 | 2 | 6 | 5 | +1 |

Source: Globo Esporte

==== Group stage ====
| Pos | Team | Pld | W | D | L | GF | GA | GD | Pts | Qualification |
|---|---|---|---|---|---|---|---|---|---|---|
| 1 | Santos | 12 | 8 | 1 | 3 | 18 | 10 | +8 | 25 | Knockout stage |
| 2 | Portuguesa | 12 | 3 | 1 | 8 | 8 | 17 | −9 | 10 | Knockout stage |
| 3 | Santo André (R) | 12 | 1 | 5 | 6 | 8 | 17 | −9 | 8 | Relegation to Série A2 |
| 4 | Ituano (R) | 12 | 1 | 3 | 8 | 5 | 19 | −14 | 6 | Relegation to Série A2 |

Source: Soccerway
(R) Relegated

==== Matches ====
| 20 January 1 | Botafogo–SP | 0–1 | Santos | Ribeirão Preto |
| 18:00 UTC-03:00 | | Report | 71', (yellow card) 73' Otero | Stadium: Estádio Santa Cruz; Attendance: 15,030; Referee: João Vitor Gobi |

| 25 January 2 | Santos | 3–1 | Ponte Preta | Santos |
| 19:30 UTC-03:00 | Giuliano 12', 56'; Julio Furch 18' | Report | (yellow card) 50' Mateus Silva; (yellow card) 65' Igor Inocêncio; 78' (pen.) Élvis | Stadium: Vila Belmiro; Attendance: 10,733; Referee: Fabiano Monteiro dos Santos |

| 28 January 3 | Palmeiras | 2–1 | Santos | São Paulo |
| 18:00 UTC-03:00 | Raphael Veiga 49'; José López 62' | Report | (yellow card) 31' Rincón; 69' Otero | Stadium: Allianz Parque; Attendance: 40,379; Referee: Raphael Claus |

| 31 January 4 | Água Santa | 0–1 | Santos | São Bernardo do Campo |
| 21:35 UTC-03:00 | Igor Henrique (yellow card) 8' (yellow-red card) 86'; Rafael Oller (yellow card) 26'; Gabriel Inocêncio (yellow card) 67' | Report | (yellow card) 38' Guilherme; (yellow card) 70' Otero; 82', (yellow card) 90+1' Joaquim; (yellow card) 90+9' Pedrinho | Stadium: Estádio 1º de Maio; Attendance: 7,197; Referee: Douglas Marques das Flores |

| 4 February 5 | Santos | 2–0 | Guarani | Santos |
| 18:00 UTC-03:00 | Joaquim (yellow card) 18'; João Schmidt (yellow card) 29'; Guilherme 58' (pen.), 82' | Report | (yellow card) 31' Camacho; (yellow card) 57' Heitor; (yellow card) 77' Hélder Santos; (yellow card) 86' Anderson Leite | Stadium: Vila Belmiro; Attendance: 11,020; Referee: João Vitor Gobi |

| 7 February 6 | Santos | 1–0 | Corinthians | Santos |
| 19:30 UTC-03:00 | João Schmidt 23'; Joaquim (yellow card) 6'; Diego Pituca (yellow card) 54' | Report | (yellow card) 5' Pedro Raul; (yellow card) 33' Fagner; (yellow card) 45+4' Romero; (yellow card) 83' Ryan | Stadium: Vila Belmiro; Attendance: 13,861; Referee: Flávio Rodrigues de Souza |

| 11 February 7 | Mirassol | 2–2 | Santos | Mirassol |
| 18:00 UTC-03:00 | Dellatorre 21'; Rodrigo Ferreira (yellow card) 57' (yellow-red card) 61'; Mário Sérgio 90+1' | Report | 15', (yellow card) 45+3' Hayner; (yellow card) 33' Diego Pituca; (yellow card) 81', (goal) 82' Willian | Stadium: Estádio José Maria de Campos Maia; Attendance: 11,086; Referee: Vinícius Gonçalves Dias Araújo |

| 14 February 8 | São Paulo | 0–1 | Santos | São Paulo |
| 19:30 UTC-03:00 | Calleri (yellow card) 50'; Pablo Maia (yellow card) 78' | Report | (yellow card) 43' Aderlan; (yellow card) 56' Willian; 66' (pen.), (yellow card) 90+9' Morelos; (yellow card) 79' Hayner; (yellow card) 90+8' Marcelinho | Stadium: Morumbi; Attendance: 45,722; Referee: Edina Alves Batista |

| 18 February 9 | Santos | 1–2 | Novorizontino | Santos |
| 16:00 UTC-03:00 | Diego Pituca 72'; Hayner (yellow card) 90+5' | Report | 13' Neto Pessoa; (yellow card) 16' Waguininho; 40' Rômulo; (yellow card) 47' Rafael Donato; (yellow card) 49' Chico; (yellow card) 72' Paulo Vitor; (yellow card) 78' Danilo Barcelos | Stadium: Vila Belmiro; Attendance: 11,665; Referee: João Vitor Gobi |

| 25 February 10 | Santos | 2–1 | São Bernardo | São Paulo |
| 16:00 UTC-03:00 | Morelos 28'; Otero (yellow card) 64'; Willian 87', (yellow card) 90+3' | Report | (yellow card) 38' Rafael Forster; (yellow card) 45+1' Matheus Régis; 70' (o.g.) João Paulo; (yellow card) 72' Vitinho; (yellow card) 75' Lucas Lima | Stadium: Morumbi; Attendance: 50,132; Referee: Flávio Rodrigues de Souza |

| 3 March 11 | Red Bull Bragantino | 1–0 | Santos | Bragança Paulista |
| 18:00 UTC-03:00 | Sasha 22'; Jadsom (yellow card) 39'; Luan Cândido (red card) 49'; Vitinho (yellow card) 60'; Thiago Borbas (yellow card) 77' (yellow-red card) 90+4'; Cleiton (yellow card) 82' | Report | (yellow card) 41' Aderlan | Stadium: Estádio Nabi Abi Chedid; Attendance: 7,085; Referee: Fabiano Monteiro dos Santos |

| 9 March 12 | Santos | 3–2 | Inter de Limeira | Santos |
| 18:00 UTC-03:00 | Julio Furch 17', 56' (pen.); João Schmidt (yellow card) 78'; Cazares 84' | Report | 16', 24' Quirino; (yellow card) 31' João Felipe; (yellow card) 39' Diego Jussani; (yellow card) 90+3' JP Galvão | Stadium: Vila Belmiro; Attendance: 10,797; Referee: Matheus Delgado Candançan |

==== Knockout stage ====
===== Quarter-final =====
| 17 March Single match | Santos | 0–0 (4–2 p) | Portuguesa | Santos |
| 20:15 UTC-03:00 | Otero (red card) 73'; JP Chermont (yellow card) 87' | Report | (yellow card) 64' Henrique Dourado; (yellow card) 90+1' Ricardinho | Stadium: Vila Belmiro; Attendance: 13,882; Referee: Raphael Claus |
| | Penalties |
| | Giuliano (penalty scored); Guilherme (penalty scored); Rincón (penalty scored); Jair (penalty scored) | | (penalty scored) Eduardo Diniz; (penalty missed) Felipe Marques; (penalty missed) Quintana; (penalty scored) Paraizo |

===== Semi-final =====
| 27 March Single match | Santos | 3–1 | Red Bull Bragantino | São Paulo |
| 20:30 UTC-03:00 | Joaquim 8'; Guilherme 45+1'; Giuliano 63'; Hayner (red card) 84' | Report | (yellow card) 26' Matheus Fernandes; (yellow card) 45+3', (goal) 51' Eduardo Sasha; (yellow card) 71' Juninho Capixaba | Stadium: Neo Química Arena; Attendance: 44,804; Referee: Matheus Delgado Candançan |

===== Finals =====
| 31 March First leg | Santos | 1–0 | Palmeiras | Santos |
| 18:00 UTC-03:00 | Otero 48'; João Schmidt (yellow card) 52'; Morelos (yellow card) 90+1'; Aderlan (yellow card) 90+4' | Report | (yellow card) 65' Zé Rafael; (yellow card) 90+2' Estêvão | Stadium: Vila Belmiro; Attendance: 15,946; Referee: Flávio Rodrigues de Souza |

| 7 April Second leg | Palmeiras | 2–0 (2–1 agg.) | Santos | São Paulo |
| 18:00 UTC-03:00 | Endrick (yellow card) 21'; Raphael Veiga 33' (pen.); Zé Rafael (yellow card) 41'; Aníbal Moreno 67'; Mayke (yellow card) 90+2' | Report | (yellow card) 58' Aderlan; (yellow card) 60' Gil; (yellow card) 61' Morelos | Stadium: Allianz Parque; Attendance: 41,446; Referee: Raphael Claus |

=== Série B ===
==== Results summary ====
| Overall | | | | | | | | Home | | | | | | Away | | | | | |
| Pld | W | D | L | GF | GA | GD | Pts | W | D | L | GF | GA | GD | W | D | L | GF | GA | GD |
|---|---|---|---|---|---|---|---|---|---|---|---|---|---|---|---|---|---|---|---|
| 38 | 20 | 8 | 10 | 57 | 32 | +25 | 68 | 12 | 4 | 3 | 34 | 13 | +21 | 8 | 4 | 7 | 23 | 19 | +4 |

Source: Soccerway

==== Results by round ====
| Round | 1 | 2 | 3 | 4 | 5 | 6 | 7 | 8 | 9 | 10 | 11 | 12 | 13 | 14 | 15 | 16 | 17 | 18 | 19 | 20 | 21 | 22 | 23 | 24 | 25 | 26 | 27 | 28 | 29 | 30 | 31 | 32 | 33 | 34 | 35 | 36 | 37 | 38 |
|---|---|---|---|---|---|---|---|---|---|---|---|---|---|---|---|---|---|---|---|---|---|---|---|---|---|---|---|---|---|---|---|---|---|---|---|---|---|---|
| Ground | H | A | H | A | A | H | A | H | A | A | H | A | H | A | H | A | H | A | H | A | H | A | H | H | A | H | A | H | H | A | H | A | H | A | H | A | H | A |
| Result | W | W | W | L | W | W | L | L | L | L | W | D | W | W | W | D | W | D | D | W | L | D | D | D | W | W | W | D | W | L | W | L | W | W | W | W | L | L |
| Position | 2 | 1 | 1 | 3 | 1 | 1 | 1 | 3 | 5 | 7 | 5 | 5 | 2 | 1 | 1 | 1 | 1 | 1 | 1 | 1 | 2 | 2 | 2 | 4 | 2 | 2 | 2 | 2 | 2 | 2 | 1 | 1 | 1 | 1 | 1 | 1 | 1 | 1 |

Source: Globo Esporte
P = Postponed

==== League table ====
| Pos | Team | Pld | W | D | L | GF | GA | GD | Pts | Promotion or relegation |
|---|---|---|---|---|---|---|---|---|---|---|
| 1 | Santos (C, P) | 38 | 20 | 8 | 10 | 57 | 32 | +25 | 68 | Promotion to 2025 Campeonato Brasileiro Série A |
| 2 | Mirassol (P) | 38 | 19 | 10 | 9 | 42 | 26 | +16 | 67 | Promotion to 2025 Campeonato Brasileiro Série A |
| 3 | Sport (P) | 38 | 19 | 9 | 10 | 57 | 37 | +20 | 66 | Promotion to 2025 Campeonato Brasileiro Série A |
| 4 | Ceará (P) | 38 | 19 | 7 | 12 | 59 | 41 | +18 | 64 | Promotion to 2025 Campeonato Brasileiro Série A |
| 5 | Novorizontino | 38 | 18 | 10 | 10 | 43 | 31 | +12 | 64 | |

Source: CBF
Rules for classification: 1) points; 2) wins; 3) goal difference; 4) goals scored; 5) head-to-head results (only between 2 teams); 6) fewest red cards; 7) fewest yellow cards; 8) drawing of lots.
(C) Champions; (P) Promoted

===== Matches =====
| 20 April 1 | Santos | 2–0 | Paysandu | Santos |
| 16:30 UTC-03:00 | Pedrinho 69'; Guilherme 90'; Joaquim (yellow card) 90+5'; Rincón (yellow card) 90+8' | Report | (yellow card) 6' Bryan; (yellow card) 26' Quintana; (yellow card) 83' Michel Macedo | Stadium: Vila Belmiro; Attendance: 0 Referee: Lucas Guimarães Rechatiko Horn |

| 26 April 2 | Avaí | 0–2 | Santos | Florianópolis |
| 20:00 UTC-03:00 | Mário Sérgio (yellow card) 47' | Report | 58', (yellow card) 68' JP Chermont; 79' Furch | Stadium: Ressacada; Attendance: 12,091; Referee: Lucas Paulo Torezin |

| 6 May 3 | Santos | 4–1 | Guarani | Santos |
| 20:00 UTC-03:00 | Guilherme 32'; Escobar (yellow card) 34'; Diego Pituca 40'; Morelos 55'; Giuliano 62' | Report | (yellow card) 45+8' Léo Santos; 73' (pen.) Caio Dantas | Stadium: Vila Belmiro; Attendance: 0 Referee: Paulo Belence Alves dos Prazeres Filho |

| 11 May 4 | Amazonas | 1–0 | Santos | Manaus |
| 17:00 UTC-03:00 | Ênio 19'; Jô (yellow card) 64' | Report | | Stadium: Arena da Amazônia; Attendance: 17,672; Referee: Caio Max Augusto Vieira |

| 15 May 5 | Ponte Preta | 1–2 | Santos | Campinas |
| 21:30 UTC-03:00 | Raphael 53' | Report | 17' Gil; 23' Giuliano | Stadium: Moisés Lucarelli; Attendance: 7,498; Referee: Marcelo de Lima Henrique |

| 19 May 6 | Santos | 4–0 | Brusque | Santos |
| 11:00 UTC-03:00 | Weslley Patati 22'; Giuliano 34'; Willian 41'; Patrick (yellow card) 77'; João Schmidt (yellow card) 78'; Morelos 81', (yellow card) 90+3' | Report | | Stadium: Vila Belmiro; Attendance: 10,325; Referee: Luciano da Silva Miranda Filho |

| 24 May 7 | América Mineiro | 2–1 | Santos | Belo Horizonte |
| 21:30 UTC-03:00 | Adyson (yellow card) 12'; Renato Marques 14'; Marlon (yellow card) 38'; Juninho 67'; Éder (yellow card) 76'; Benítez (yellow card) 78' | Report | 30', (yellow card) 41' Willian | Stadium: Independência; Attendance: 7,303; Referee: Wilton Pereira Sampaio |

| 3 June 8 | Santos | 1–2 | Botafogo-SP | Londrina |
| 20:00 UTC-03:00 | JP Chermont (yellow card) 34'; Rincón (yellow card) 38'; Joaquim 74'; Cazares (yellow card) 90+4' | Report | 43' Douglas Baggio; 51' João Costa; (yellow card) 60' Patrick Brey; (yellow card) 90+2' Toró | Stadium: Estádio do Café; Attendance: 11,916; Referee: Gustavo Ervino Bauermann |

| 7 June 9 | Novorizontino | 3–1 | Santos | Novo Horizonte |
| 21:00 UTC-03:00 | Fabrício Daniel 21'; Reverson 52'; Lucca (yellow card) 72'; Rafael Donato 81'; Geovane (yellow card) 88'; Patrick (yellow card) 90+2' | Report | 48' Diego Pituca; (yellow card) 82' Hayner | Stadium: Jorge Ismael de Biasi; Attendance: 8,263; Referee: Anderson Daronco |

| 14 June 10 | Operário Ferroviário | 1–0 | Santos | Ponta Grossa |
| 19:00 UTC-03:00 | Willian Machado 21'; Jacy (yellow card) 42'; Pará (yellow card) 75'; Vinícius Diniz (yellow card) 81' | Report | (yellow card) 27' Hayner; (yellow card) 54' Pedrinho; (yellow card) 63' João Schmidt; (yellow card) 81' Gil; (yellow card) 90+7' Otero | Stadium: Germano Krüger; Attendance: 7,750; Referee: Alex Gomes Stefano |

| 19 June 11 | Santos | 2–0 | Goiás | Santos |
| 19:00 UTC-03:00 | Escobar (yellow card) 62'; Tadeu 80' (o.g.); Willian 85' | Report | (yellow card) 28' Luiz Henrique; (yellow card) 68' (yellow-red card) 90+5' Lucas Ribeiro | Stadium: Vila Belmiro; Attendance: 8,720; Referee: Rodrigo José Pereira de Lima |

| 25 June 12 | Mirassol | 0–0 | Santos | Mirassol |
| 19:00 UTC-03:00 | Alex Silva (yellow card) 90+6' | Report | (yellow card) 26' Escobar; (yellow card) 90+1' Willian; (yellow card) 90+6' Giuliano | Stadium: José Maria de Campos Maia; Attendance: 7,432; Referee: Paulo César Zanovelli da Silva |

| 1 July 13 | Santos | 1–0 | Chapecoense | Santos |
| 19:00 UTC-03:00 | Willian (yellow card) 79', (goal) 90+3'; João Schmidt (yellow card) 85' | Report | (yellow card) 10' Marcelo Souza; (yellow card) 42' Foguinho; (yellow card) 47' Rafael Carvalheira; (yellow card) 88' Bruno Vinicius | Stadium: Vila Belmiro; Attendance: 9,055; Referee: Jefferson Ferreira de Moraes |

| 5 July 14 | Ceará | 0–1 | Santos | Fortaleza |
| 19:00 UTC-03:00 | Lourenço (yellow card) 84'; Saulo Mineiro (yellow card) 90+17' | Report | (yellow card) 15' Aderlan; 24' Otero; (yellow card) 45+1' Jair; (yellow card) 45+4' Pedrinho; (yellow card) 55' Sandry; (red card) 61' Rodrigo Ferreira; (yellow card) 88' Gabriel Brazão | Stadium: Castelão; Attendance: 30,171; Referee: Emerson Ricardo de Almeida Andrade |

| 15 July 15 | Santos | 2–0 | Ituano | Santos |
| 20:00 UTC-03:00 | Diego Pituca 10'; Guilherme (penalty missed) 18', 18' | Report | (yellow card) 27' Rodrigo; (yellow card) 62' Lucas Dias; (yellow card) 90+3' Wálber | Stadium: Vila Belmiro; Attendance: 12,839; Referee: Lucas Paulo Torezin |

| 18 July 16 | Vila Nova | 1–1 | Santos | Goiânia |
| 20:00 UTC-03:00 | Henrique Almeida (yellow card) 6' (yellow-red card) 76'; Jemmes 65' | Report | 55' Furch | Stadium: OBA; Attendance: 9,660; Referee: Rodrigo José Pereira de Lima |

| 22 July 17 | Santos | 4–0 | Coritiba | Santos |
| 20:00 UTC-03:00 | Giuliano 4'; Maurício Antônio 9' (o.g.); Furch 73' (pen.); Pedrinho 81' | Report | (yellow card) 56' Natanael; (yellow card) 72' Pedro Morisco | Stadium: Vila Belmiro; Attendance: 11,928; Referee: Marcelo de Lima Henrique |

| 28 July 18 | CRB | 1–1 | Santos | Maceió |
| 18:30 UTC-03:00 | Léo Pereira (yellow card) 45'; Saimon (yellow card) 71'; Anselmo Ramon 77'; Chay (yellow card) 86' | Report | 57' Serginho; (yellow card) 86' Diego Pituca; (yellow card) 90+5' Miguel Terceros | Stadium: Rei Pelé; Attendance: 13,915; Referee: Sávio Pereira Sampaio |

| 2 August 19 | Santos | 1–1 | Sport Recife | Santos |
| 21:30 UTC-03:00 | Guilherme 29'; Serginho (yellow card) 61'; Gil (yellow card) 68' | Report | (yellow card) 33' Luciano Castán; (yellow card) 43' Felipinho; 82' Gustavo Coutinho; (yellow card) 90+1' Fabricio Domínguez | Stadium: Vila Belmiro; Attendance: 13,629; Referee: Paulo César Zanovelli da Silva |
Note: According to the official match summary, Gil was booked instead of Escobar

| 9 August 20 | Paysandu | 0–3 | Santos | Belém |
| 20:00 UTC-03:00 | Borasi (yellow card) 51'; Netinho (red card) 77' | Report | (yellow card) 20' Rodrigo Ferreira; 39', 90+8', (yellow card) 63' Guilherme; (yellow card) 81' Otero; (yellow card) 82' Willian; 90+1', (yellow card) 90+2' Weslley Patati | Stadium: Mangueirão; Attendance: 36,720; Referee: Denis Ribeiro Serafim |

| 17 August 21 | Santos | 0–1 | Avaí | Santos |
| 16:00 UTC-03:00 | | Report | 38' Giovanni; (yellow card) 63' César; (yellow card) 81' Ronaldo Henrique | Stadium: Vila Belmiro; Attendance: 13,545; Referee: Anderson Daronco |

| 21 August 22 | Guarani | 1–1 | Santos | Campinas |
| 19:00 UTC-03:00 | Anderson Leite 88' | Report | (yellow card) 44' JP Chermont; 69', (yellow card) 70' Escobar; (yellow card) 81' Hayner | Stadium: Brinco de Ouro da Princesa; Attendance: 10,567; Referee: Gustavo Ervino Bauermann |

| 24 August 23 | Santos | 0–0 | Amazonas | Santos |
| 16:00 UTC-03:00 | Giuliano (yellow card) 18'; Sandry (yellow card) 41'; Escobar (red card) 58' | Report | (yellow card) 12' Jorge Jiménez; (yellow card) 76' Miranda; (yellow card) 81' Sidcley; (yellow card) 83' Cauan Barros | Stadium: Vila Belmiro; Attendance: 10,967; Referee: Jefferson Ferreira de Moraes |

| 30 August 24 | Santos | 2–2 | Ponte Preta | Santos |
| 21:30 UTC-03:00 | Giuliano 24'; João Basso 33' | Report | (yellow card) 26', (goal) 56' Jeh; (yellow card) 45' (yellow-red card) 45' Élvis; (yellow card) 77' João Gabriel; 90+1' Dodô | Stadium: Vila Belmiro; Attendance: 6,946; Referee: Sávio Pereira Sampaio |

| 7 September 25 | Brusque | 0–1 | Santos | Joinville |
| 16:00 UTC-03:00 | Luiz Henrique (yellow card) 9'; Paulinho Moccelin (yellow card) 12'; Ocampo (yellow card) 47' | Report | 10' Wendel Silva; (yellow card) 27' Hayner | Stadium: Arena Joinville; Attendance: 4,927; Referee: Rafael Rodrigo Klein |

| 15 September 26 | Santos | 2–1 | América Mineiro | Santos |
| 16:00 UTC-03:00 | Otero (yellow card) 37'; Escobar (yellow card) 46'; Wendel Silva 60'; JP Chermont 71', (yellow card) 76'; João Schmidt (yellow card) 90+1'; Luan Peres (yellow card) 90+12' | Report | (yellow card) 49' Dalberson; (yellow card) 90+2' Ricardo Silva; 90+3' Moisés | Stadium: Vila Belmiro; Attendance: 10,160; Referee: Arthur Gomes Rabelo |

| 19 September 27 | Botafogo-SP | 0–1 | Santos | Ribeirão Preto |
| 21:30 UTC-03:00 | Abdulai (yellow card) 23'; Fábio Sanches (yellow card) 83'; Victor Andrade (yellow card) 90+4' | Report | 41' Giuliano; (yellow card) 73' Rodrigo Ferreira; (yellow card) 78' Diego Pituca; (yellow card) 88' João Schmidt | Stadium: Santa Cruz; Attendance: 8,726; Referee: Matheus Delgado Candançan |

| 23 September 28 | Santos | 1–1 | Novorizontino | Santos |
| 21:00 UTC-03:00 | Otero 32' | Report | 4' Pablo Dyego; (yellow card) 38' Patrick; (yellow card) 47' Igor Formiga; (yellow card) 76' Renato Palm | Stadium: Vila Belmiro; Attendance: 11,119; Referee: Alex Gomes Stefano |

| 28 September 29 | Santos | 1–0 | Operário Ferroviário | Santos |
| 18:00 UTC-03:00 | Giuliano 22' | Report | (yellow card) 36' Vinícius Diniz | Stadium: Vila Belmiro; Attendance: 9,938; Referee: Jonathan Benkenstein Pinheiro |

| 7 October 30 | Goiás | 3–1 | Santos | Goiânia |
| 21:00 UTC-03:00 | Welliton (yellow card) 7', (goal) 62'; Rildo 10', 14'; Rafael Gava (yellow card) 36' | Report | (yellow card) 19' JP Chermont; 41' (pen.) Giuliano; (yellow card) 90+1' João Schmidt; (yellow card) 90+2' Jair | Stadium: Serrinha; Attendance: 8,478; Referee: Marcelo de Lima Henrique |

| 12 October 31 | Santos | 3–2 | Mirassol | Santos |
| 18:30 UTC-03:00 | Giuliano 2'; Willian 13'; Guilherme (yellow card) 18'; Escobar (yellow card) 76'; Luan Peres 84'; Gil (yellow card) 84'; Diego Pituca (yellow card) 85' (yellow-red card) 90+3'; Gabriel Brazão (yellow card) 90+11' | Report | 6' Gabriel; (yellow card) 53' Lucas Gazal; 73' Dellatorre | Stadium: Vila Belmiro; Attendance: 11,816; Referee: Gustavo Ervino Bauermann |

| 16 October 32 | Chapecoense | 3–2 | Santos | Chapecó |
| 20:00 UTC-03:00 | Mário Sérgio 45+2'; Marcelinho (yellow card) 65', (goal) 68'; Rafael Carvalheira 79' | Report | 44' Guilherme; 86' Otero | Stadium: Arena Condá; Attendance: 9,971; Referee: Sávio Pereira Sampaio |

| 22 October 33 | Santos | 1–0 | Ceará | Santos |
| 19:00 UTC-03:00 | Diego Pituca 14'; Hayner (yellow card) 39'; Gabriel Brazão (yellow card) 73'; João Schmidt (yellow card) 75' | Report | | Stadium: Vila Belmiro; Attendance: 8,548; Referee: Rafael Rodrigo Klein |

| 28 October 34 | Ituano | 0–2 | Santos | Itu |
| 19:00 UTC-03:00 | Thonny Anderson (yellow card) 45+2'; Yann Rolim (yellow card) 72'; Claudinho (yellow card) 74' | Report | 18', (yellow card) 32' Serginho; 51' Guilherme | Stadium: Novelli Júnior; Attendance: 11,716; Referee: Luiz Flávio de Oliveira |

| 2 November 35 | Santos | 3–0 | Vila Nova | Santos |
| 16:30 UTC-03:00 | João Basso 56', (yellow card) 85'; João Schmidt (yellow card) 74'; Diego Pituca (yellow card) 81'; Guilherme 90+5' (pen.); Otero 90+9', (yellow card) 90+11' | Report | (yellow card) 64' Vanderley; (yellow card) 90+4' Alesson; (yellow card) 90+8' Jemmes | Stadium: Vila Belmiro; Attendance: 14,029; Referee: Yuri Elino Ferreira da Cruz |

| 11 November 36 | Coritiba | 0–2 | Santos | Curitiba |
| 21:00 UTC-03:00 | Marcelo Benevenuto (yellow card) 39'; Júnior Brumado (yellow card) 39' | Report | 20', (yellow card) 37' Wendel Silva; 41' Otero; (yellow card) 81' Sandry | Stadium: Couto Pereira; Attendance: 16,282; Referee: Gustavo Ervino Bauermann |

| 17 November 37 | Santos | 0–2 | CRB | Santos |
| 16:00 UTC-03:00 | | Report | (yellow card) 3' Matheus Ribeiro; 16' Labandeira; 64' Kleiton; (yellow card) 85' Chay; (yellow card) 90+4' Falcão | Stadium: Vila Belmiro; Attendance: 15,750; Referee: Ramon Abatti Abel |

| 24 November 38 | Sport Recife | 2–1 | Santos | Recife |
| 18:30 UTC-03:00 | Lucas Lima 45+5' (pen.), 63'; Fabricio Domínguez (yellow card) 47'; Julián Fernández (yellow card) 66'; Chrystian Barletta (yellow card) 78', (penalty missed) 84'; Felipinho (yellow card) 90+8' | Report | (yellow card) 14' Miguel Terceros; (yellow card) 45+4' Diego Pituca; (yellow card) 45+4' Hayner; 76', (yellow card) 90+8' Wendel Silva; (yellow card) 86' Sandry | Stadium: Ilha do Retiro; Attendance: 24,389; Referee: Bruno Arleu de Araújo |

== See also ==
- 2024 Santos FC (women) season
