= João Pedro (footballer, born 2008) =

Brazilian footballer

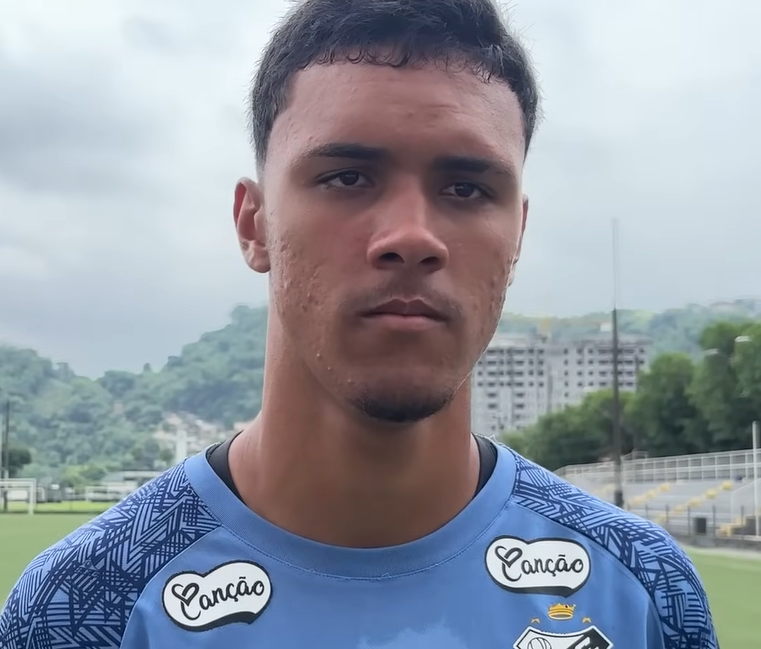
- João Pedro in 2024

Personal information
- Full name: João Pedro Lúcio da Silva
- Date of birth: 18 March 2008 (age 18)
- Place of birth: Santos, Brazil
- Height: 1.98 m (6 ft 6 in)
- Position: Goalkeeper

Team information
- Current team: Santos
- Number: 79

Youth career
- Gremetal
- 2018–: Santos

Senior career*
Years	Team	Apps	(Gls)
2024–	Santos	0	(0)

International career^{‡}
2023–2024	Brazil U15	7	(0)
2024	Brazil U16		
2025	Brazil U17	7	(0)
2026–	Brazil U20	4	(0)
- * Club domestic league appearances and goals as of 26 November 2025 ‡ National team caps and goals as of 01:04, 5 October 2026 (UTC)

João Pedro Lúcio da Silva (born 19 March 2008), known as João Pedro, is a Brazilian professional footballer who plays as a goalkeeper for Santos.

== Club career ==
Born in Santos, São Paulo, João Pedro started his career in futsal, playing for hometown side Gremetal. Initially an outfield player, he was moved to the goalkeeper position due to his height, and joined the youth categories of Santos FC at the age of nine. In January 2024, aged 15, he spent the pre-season with the first team after the club opted to separate all reserve goalkeepers from the squad, and despite playing in a training match against Oeste, he was unable to be registered in the 2024 Campeonato Paulista as he did not have the minimum age required.

João Pedro was an unused substitute in a 1–0 Série B away loss to Amazonas in May 2024, and signed his first professional contract with the club shortly after, agreeing to a deal until April 2027. Unused in a further two matches for the main squad, he was a regular starter for the under-17 team in the season, as they lifted the Campeonato Paulista Sub-17.

João Pedro began the 2025 season playing for the under-20s in the 2025 Copa São Paulo de Futebol Júnior, before returning to the under-17s shortly after. In July of that year, he started to train with the first team in a regular basis, and agreed to new terms of his contract on 26 September.

On 3 June 2026, after being a third-choice in the first team behind Gabriel Brazão and Diógenes, João Pedro renewed his contract with Santos until April 2031. He made his unofficial debut for the club on 5 July, in a 3–0 friendly win over União São João.

== International career ==
In 2023, João Pedro was called up to the Brazil national under-15 team for a tournament in Paraguay. In May of the following year, he was called up to the under-16s, and was included in the list for the 2023 South American U-15 Championship in September 2024 by head coach Dudu Patetuci, as the tournament was delayed for a year. He played in all four matches of the competition, as his side finished fifth.

In March 2025, João Pedro was called up to the under-17 team for the 2025 South American U-17 Championship. A backup to Arthur Nascimento, he only made his debut in the category in a friendly against Mexico in June, and was also called up for the 2025 FIFA U-17 World Cup in October.

João Pedro immediately became a starter in the World Cup, and was named man of the match twice during the competition due to his performance in penalty shootouts against Paraguay and France. On 13 March 2026, he and other two Santos teammates were called up to the under-20 team.

== Career statistics ==
As of 27 November 2025.

Club	Season	League			State League		Cup		Continental		Other		Total	
Club	Season	Division	Apps	Goals	Apps	Goals	Apps	Goals	Apps	Goals	Apps	Goals	Apps	Goals
Santos	2024	Série B	0	0	—		—		—		—		0	0
Santos	2025	Série A	0	0	0	0	0	0	—		—		0	0
Santos	2026	Série A	0	0	0	0	0	0	0	0	—		0	0
Career total			0	0	0	0	0	0	0	0	0	0	0	0

== Honours ==
Santos U17

- Campeonato Paulista Sub-17: 2024

Santos U20

- Campeonato Paulista Sub-20: 2025

Santos

- Campeonato Brasileiro Série B: 2024

Brazil U17

- South American U-17 Championship: 2025
