= Marcelinho (footballer, born 2002) =

Brazilian footballer

Personal information
- Full name: Marcelo José de Lima Benedini
- Date of birth: 11 December 2002 (age 23)
- Place of birth: Anicuns, Brazil
- Height: 1.64 m (5 ft 5 in)
- Position: Forward

Team information
- Current team: Al-Dhafra
- Number: 99

Youth career
- –2018: Atlético Goianiense
- 2019–2021: Almirante Barroso
- 2019–2021: → Palmeiras (loan)
- 2021: → Vasco da Gama (loan)
- 2022: Cruzeiro

Senior career*
Years	Team	Apps	(Gls)
2020–2021	Almirante Barroso	0	(0)
2020–2021	→ Palmeiras (loan)	4	(0)
2022	Cruzeiro	4	(0)
2022	→ Ferroviária (loan)	2	(0)
2022	→ Água Santa (loan)	0	(0)
2023–2025	Tombense	44	(6)
2024	→ Santos (loan)	5	(0)
2024	→ Juventude (loan)	26	(2)
2025	→ Atlético Goianiense (loan)	14	(4)
2025–	Al-Dhafra	2	(1)
- * Club domestic league appearances and goals as of 21:16, 2 May 2025 (UTC)

Marcelo José de Lima Filho (born 11 December 2002), commonly known as Marcelinho, is a Brazilian footballer who plays as a forward for Al-Dhafra.

== Career ==
=== Early career ===
Born in Anicuns, Goiás, Marcelinho began his career with the youth sides of Atlético Goianiense before joining Almirante Barroso. On 6 July 2019, he was loaned to Palmeiras, with a buyout clause.

=== Palmeiras ===
Marcelinho made his first team debut for Verdão on 18 November 2020, due to a COVID-19 outbreak in the squad, coming on as a second-half substitute for fellow youth graduate Aníbal Vega in a 2–2 away draw against Ceará, for the year's Copa do Brasil. He made his Série A debut three days later, starting in a 1–0 loss at Goiás.

In July 2021, Marcelinho left Verdão after his loan expired, and moved to Vasco da Gama also in a temporary deal, being assigned to the under-20 team.

=== Cruzeiro ===
On 2 December 2021, Marcelinho agreed to a two-year contract with Cruzeiro. Initially a member of the under-20s during the 2022 Copa São Paulo de Futebol Júnior, he featured in five first team matches before moving out on loan to Ferroviária on 8 July 2022.

On 30 July 2022, after Ferroviária's elimination from the 2022 Série D, Marcelinho moved to Água Santa also on loan. He scored his first senior goal the following day, netting a last-minute equalizer in a 1–1 away draw against Juventus-SP, for the year's Copa Paulista.

On 16 November 2022, Marcelinho rescinded his contract with Cruzeiro.

=== Tombense ===
On 13 December 2022, Marcelinho signed for Tombense in the Série B. Regularly used, he scored seven goals during the campaign as his side suffered relegation.

==== Loan to Santos ====
On 30 December 2023, Marcelinho joined Santos on a one-year loan deal. He made his club debut on 31 January of the following year, replacing Rómulo Otero in a 1–0 Campeonato Paulista away win over former side Água Santa.

On 10 April 2024, Santos announced that Marcelinho's loan contract was rescinded; he featured in just five matches for the club.

== Career statistics ==
As of 21 February 2024.

Club	Season	League			State League (Note: Includes Campeonato Paulista, Campeonato Mineiro)		Cup (Note: Includes Copa do Brasil)		Continental		Other		Total	
Club	Season	Division	Apps	Goals	Apps	Goals	Apps	Goals	Apps	Goals	Apps	Goals	Apps	Goals
Palmeiras	2020	Série A	2	0	0	0	1	0	0	0	0	0	3	0
Palmeiras	2021	Série A	0	0	2	0	0	0	0	0	0	0	2	0
Palmeiras	Total		2	0	2	0	1	0	0	0	0	0	5	0
Cruzeiro	2022	Série B	2	0	2	0	1	0	—		—		5	0
Ferroviária	2022	Série D	2	0	—		—		—		—		2	0
Água Santa	2022	Paulista	—		—		—		—		4 (Note: Appearance(s) in Copa Paulista)	1	4	1
Tombense	2023	Série B	35	4	9	2	3	1	—		—		47	7
Santos	2024	Série B	0	0	5	0	—		—		—		5	0
Juventude	2024	Série A	2	0	—		—		—		—		2	0
Career total			43	4	18	2	5	1	0	0	4	1	70	8
