= Rodrigo Ferreira (footballer, born 1995) =

Portuguese footballer

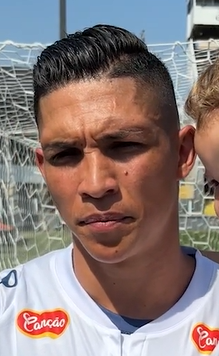
- Rodrigo Ferreira in 2024

Personal information
- Full name: Rodrigo Ferreira da Silva
- Date of birth: 29 March 1995 (age 31)
- Place of birth: Cotia, Brazil
- Height: 1.78 m (5 ft 10 in)
- Position: Right-back

Team information
- Current team: São Bernardo
- Number: 2

Youth career
- 2012: Cotia FC
- 2013: Tanabi
- 2014–2015: Taboão da Serra

Senior career*
Years	Team	Apps	(Gls)
2015	Taboão da Serra	26	(2)
2016	Batatais	14	(0)
2017	Mogi Mirim	27	(2)
2018	Cuiabá	3	(0)
2018	Guarani de Palhoça	11	(2)
2018–2019	Ituano	2	(0)
2019	→ Marcílio Dias (loan)	2	(0)
2020–2021	Marcílio Dias	10	(1)
2020	→ Brasil de Pelotas (loan)	29	(1)
2021	→ Botafogo-SP (loan)	28	(2)
2022–2024	Mirassol	26	(3)
2022–2023	→ Grêmio (loan)	23	(0)
2024–2025	Santos	21	(0)
2025	→ São Bernardo (loan)	17	(2)
2025–	São Bernardo	41	(5)
- * Club domestic league appearances and goals as of 18 November 2026

Rodrigo Ferreira da Silva (born 29 March 1995), known as Rodrigo Ferreira or just Rodrigo, is a Brazilian professional footballer who plays as a right-back for São Bernardo.

== Career ==
=== Early career ===
Born in Cotia, São Paulo, Rodrigo began his career with hometown side Cotia FC, and subsequently played with the youth sides of Tanabi and Taboão da Serra. He made his senior debut with the latter on 19 April 2015, starting in a 0–0 Campeonato Paulista Segunda Divisão away draw against Jabaquara.

Rodrigo scored his first senior goal on 8 August 2015, netting his team's second in a 4–3 away win over Guarulhos. A regular starter for CATS, he signed for Batatais in February 2016, after a short period on trial with Santos' B-team.

In January 2017, Rodrigo signed for Série C side Mogi Mirim, being a first-choice during the year as the club suffered relegation. On 5 December, he was announced in the squad of Cuiabá for the upcoming season.

After featuring rarely for Dourado, Rodrigo moved to Guarani de Palhoça in June 2018. In September, however, he signed for Ituano.

=== Marcílio Dias ===
In November 2018, Marcílio Dias announced the loan of Rodrigo for the 2019 season. In January 2019, after just two matches, he suffered a knee injury which sidelined him for the remainder of the campaign.

In January 2020, now fully recovered, Rodrigo signed a permanent contract with Marcílio. On 13 May 2020, after establishing himself as a regular starter, he renewed his contract with the club until 2021.

==== Loan to Brasil de Pelotas ====
On 6 August 2020, Rodrigo was loaned to Série B side Brasil de Pelotas until the end of the year. He made his debut in the category the following day, coming on as a second-half substitute for Bruno Matias in a 0–0 away draw against former side Cuiabá.

Rodrigo scored his first goal for Xavante on 26 September 2020, netting the equalizer in a 1–1 home draw against Paraná, and finished the season with 29 appearances.

==== Loan to Botafogo-SP ====
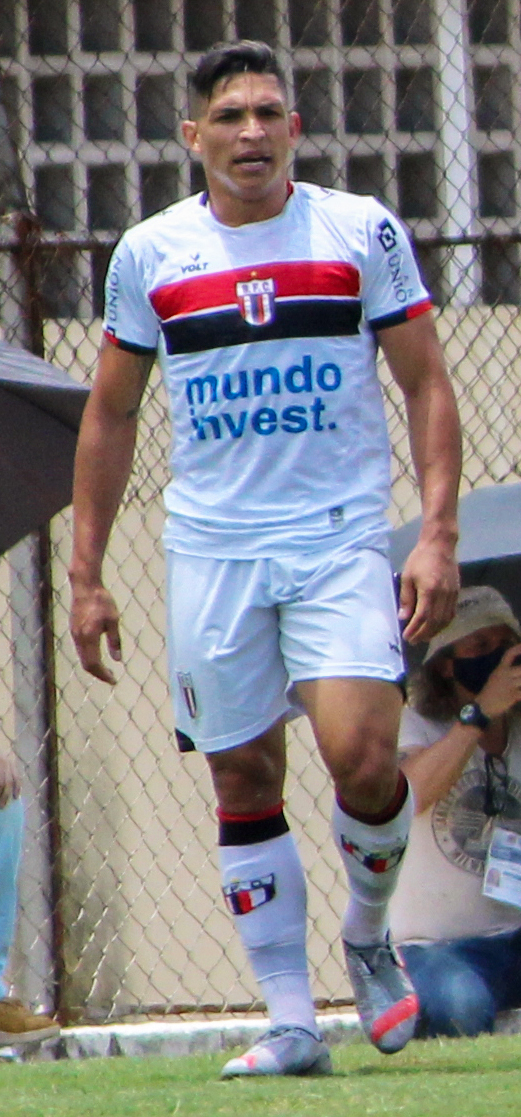
Rodrigo playing for Botafogo-SP in 2021

On 18 February 2021, Rodrigo was presented at third division side Botafogo-SP on loan for the year. A regular starter, he departed Bota on 2 December, as his loan was due to expire.

=== Mirassol ===
On 9 December 2021, Rodrigo was presented at Mirassol for the upcoming campaign. He started in all 11 appearances in the 2022 Campeonato Paulista, only missing one match due to suspension.

==== Loan to Grêmio ====
On 29 March 2022, Grêmio announced the signing of Rodrigo on a loan deal until December. Despite featuring more than Edílson and Leonardo Gomes as the club achieved promotion to the Série A, all three were deemed surplus to requirements for the 2023 season.

In December 2022, after Rodrigo suffered an anterior cruciate ligament injury, his loan contract was extended to cover his recovery. In August 2023, now fully recovered, he left the club.

==== Return from loan ====
Mirassol announced Rodrigo's return on 3 August 2023, but only returned to action on 22 September, in a 3–0 away win over Ponte Preta. Despite featuring in only five matches upon returning, he began the 2024 campaign as an undisputed starter.

=== Santos ===
On 5 March 2024, Santos announced the signing of Rodrigo on a two-year contract. He made his debut for the club on 19 April, replacing Hayner at half-time in a 2–0 home win over Paysandu.

=== São Bernardo ===
On 13 January 2025, Rodrigo Ferreira was announced on loan at São Bernardo for the season. On 27 August, he rescinded his contract with Santos and joined the former permanently.

== Career statistics ==
As of 27 August 2025.

Club	Season	League			State league		Cup		Continental		Other		Total	
Club	Season	Division	Apps	Goals	Apps	Goals	Apps	Goals	Apps	Goals	Apps	Goals	Apps	Goals
Taboão da Serra	2015	Paulista 2ª Divisão	—		26	2	—		—		—		26	2
Batatais	2016	Paulista A2	—		14	0	—		—		—		14	0
Mogi Mirim	2017	Série C	16	2	11	0	—		—		—		27	3
Cuiabá	2018	Série C	0	0	3	0	1	0	—		2 (Note: Appearance(s) in Copa Verde)	0	6	0
Guarani de Palhoça	2018	Catarinense Série B	—		11	2	—		—		—		11	2
Ituano	2018	Paulista	—		—		—		—		2 (Note: Appearance(s) in Copa Paulista)	0	2	0
Marcílio Dias	2019	Catarinense	—		2	0	—		—		6 (Note: Appearance(s) in Copa Santa Catarina)	0	8	0
Marcílio Dias	2020	Série D	0	0	10	1	—		—		—		10	1
Marcílio Dias	Total		0	0	12	1	—		—		6	0	18	1
Brasil de Pelotas (loan)	2020	Série B	29	1	—		1	0	—		—		30	1
Botafogo-SP (loan)	2021	Série C	17	2	11	0	—		—		10	1	38	3
Mirassol	2022	Série C	0	0	11	1	2	0	—		—		13	1
Mirassol	2023	Série B	5	0	—		—		—		—		5	0
Mirassol	2024	Série B	0	0	10	2	—		—		—		10	2
Mirassol	Total		5	0	21	3	2	0	—		—		28	3
Grêmio (loan)	2022	Série B	23	0	—		—		—		—		23	0
Grêmio (loan)	2023	Série A	0	0	0	0	0	0	—		—		0	0
Grêmio (loan)	Total		23	0	0	0	0	0	—		—		23	0
Santos	2024	Série B	21	0	—		—		—		—		21	0
São Bernardo	2025	Série C	7	0	10	2	—		—		—		17	2
Career total			118	5	119	10	4	0	0	0	20	1	261	17

== Honours ==
Santos

- Campeonato Brasileiro Série B: 2024
