= Breno Sossai =

Brazilian footballer

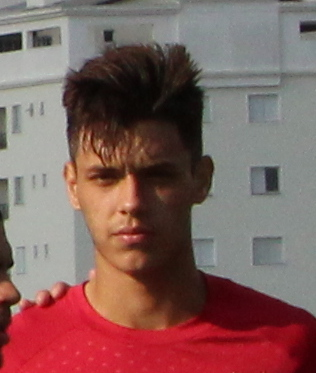
- Breno with Santos in 2019

Personal information
- Full name: Breno Silvano Sossai
- Date of birth: 22 January 2001 (age 25)
- Place of birth: Santos, Brazil
- Height: 1.86 m (6 ft 1 in)
- Position: Goalkeeper

Team information
- Current team: Americano

Youth career
- 2011–2022: Santos

Senior career*
Years	Team	Apps	(Gls)
2023–2024	Santos	0	(0)
2024	→ Paranavaí (loan)	1	(0)
2024–2025	Joinville	0	(0)
2025–	Americano	0	(0)
- * Club domestic league appearances and goals as of 20:07, 3 July 2024 (UTC)

Breno Silvano Sossai (born 22 January 2001), known as Breno Sossai or simply Breno, is a Brazilian footballer who plays as a goalkeeper for Americano.

== Club career ==
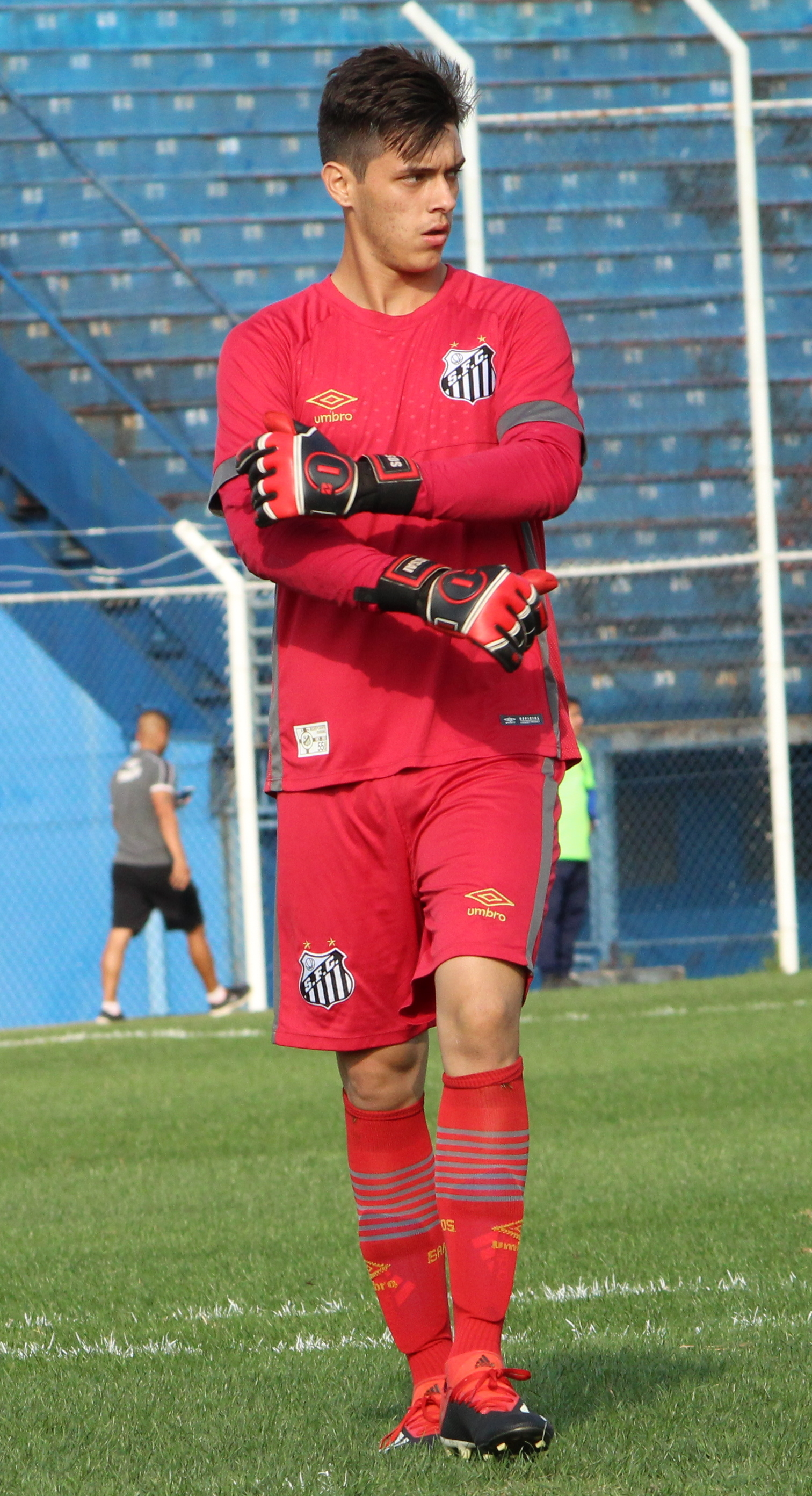
Breno with Santos in 2019

Born in Santos, São Paulo, Breno joined Santos' youth setup in 2011, aged ten. On 8 December 2020, he signed his first professional contract with the club, agreeing to a deal until 2022.

Breno was not included in the 2022 Copa São Paulo de Futebol Júnior squad due to a knee injury. On 2 September 2022, he further extended his link until October 2024.

Breno was mainly a fifth-choice behind João Paulo, Vladimir, Diógenes and Paulo Mazoti in the club's first-ever relegation, and was one of the several players deemed surplus to requirements for the 2024 campaign. In February 2024, however, he was registered by the club in the 2024 Campeonato Paulista, after being reintegrated and becoming a fourth-choice behind João Paulo, new signing Gabriel Brazão and Diógenes.

On 4 April 2024, Breno was loaned to Paranavaí for the year's Campeonato Paranaense Série Prata. He made his senior debut on 23 June, starting in a 3–0 away loss to Patriotas.

On 3 September 2024, Breno joined Joinville on a contract until the end of 2025.

== Career statistics ==
As of 2 July 2024

Club	Season	League			State League		Cup		Continental		Other		Total	
Club	Season	Division	Apps	Goals	Apps	Goals	Apps	Goals	Apps	Goals	Apps	Goals	Apps	Goals
Paranavaí	2024	Paranaense Série Prata	—		1	0	—		—		—		1	0
Joinville	2024	Catarinense	—		—		—		—		1 (Note: Appearance(s) in Copa Santa Catarina)	0	1	0
Americano	2025	Carioca Série A2	—		0	0	—		—		—		0	0
Career total			0	0	1	0	0	0	0	0	1	0	2	0
