= Wendel Silva =

Brazilian footballer

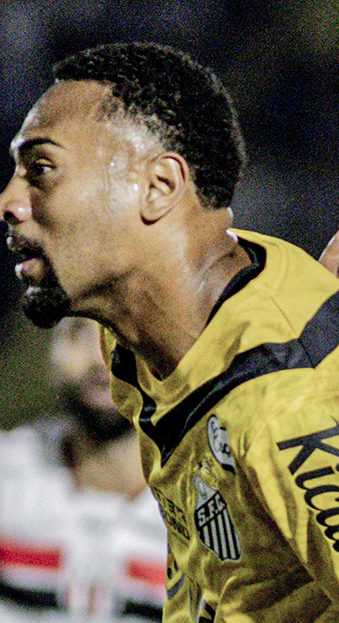
- Wendel playing for Santos in 2024

Personal information
- Full name: Wendel da Silva Costa
- Date of birth: 2 August 2000 (age 26)
- Place of birth: Rio de Janeiro, Brazil
- Height: 1.80 m (5 ft 11 in)
- Position: Forward

Team information
- Current team: Ceará
- Number: 9

Youth career
- 2015–2018: Flamengo

Senior career*
Years	Team	Apps	(Gls)
2018–2020	Flamengo	5	(0)
2020–2022	Leixões	34	(6)
2021	→ Covilhã (loan)	9	(1)
2022–2024	Porto B	59	(26)
2022–2024	Porto	0	(0)
2024–2025	→ Santos (loan)	19	(4)
2025	→ Santa Clara (loan)	6	(2)
2025–	Santa Clara	13	(1)
2026–	→ Ceará (loan)	17	(2)
- * Club domestic league appearances and goals as of 18 November 2026

Wendel da Silva Costa (born 2 August 2000), sometimes known as just Wendel, is a Brazilian professional footballer who plays as a forward for Ceará, on loan from Santa Clara.

== Career ==
=== Flamengo ===
Born in Rio de Janeiro, Wendel joined Flamengo's youth sides in 2015, aged 15. He made his first team debut on 17 January 2018, starting in a 2–0 Campeonato Carioca away win over Volta Redonda, as the club used only under-20 players.

After another appearance in the Carioca, Wendel subsequently returned to the under-20s, netting the winner in the 2018 Copa São Paulo de Futebol Júnior final over São Paulo which ensured Fla's fourth title in the competition. He would continue to feature in the under-20 squad in the following years, featuring in a further three appearances with the main squad in the 2020 Carioca.

=== Leixões ===
On 25 August 2020, Liga Portugal 2 club Leixões announced the signing of Wendel. He made his debut abroad on 19 September, coming on as a late substitute for compatriot Lucas Lopes in a 0–0 away draw against Arouca.

==== Loan to Covilhã ====
In February 2021, after being rarely used, Wendel was loaned to fellow second division club Sporting da Covilhã until the end of the season. He scored his first professional goal while at the club, netting the equalizer in a 2–2 away draw against Mafra on 24 April.

==== 2021–22 season ====
Upon returning, Wendel became a regular starter for Leixões, and scored his first goal for the club on 22 August 2021, in a 2–1 home win over Académica de Coimbra. He finished the campaign with six goals, as the club finished in the eighth position.

=== Porto ===
On 11 July 2022, Wendel transferred to FC Porto's B-team, also in the second level. He made his first team debut on 25 November, coming off the bench to replace Wendell Borges for the final two minutes of a 2–2 home draw against Mafra in the Taça da Liga.

Despite only featuring in one further appearance for the main squad (a 3–1 Taça de Portugal home win over Vitória de Guimarães on 17 April 2024), Wendel was a first-choice for the B's, scoring eight goals in 2022–23 and a career-best 18 goals in 2023–24.

==== Loan to Santos ====
On 19 August 2024, Wendel was announced at Santos back in his home country on loan until July 2025, for a rumoured fee of € 500,000, plus an obligatory €3 million buyout clause if the player scores 15 goals during the loan period. He made his debut for the club five days later, starting in a 0–0 Série B home draw against Amazonas, and scored his first goal on 7 September, in a 1–0 away win over Brusque.

Despite finishing the 2024 season as a starter, Wendel was not a first-choice under new head coach Pedro Caixinha.

==== Loan to Santa Clara ====
On 1 February 2025, after having his loan with Santos cut short, Wendel returned to Portugal with Santa Clara.

== Career statistics ==
=== Club ===
As of 7 February 2026

Appearances and goals by club, season and competition
Club	Season	League			State league (Note: Includes Campeonato Carioca)		National cup (Note: Includes Copa do Brasil, Taça de Portugal)		League cup (Note: Includes Taça da Liga)		Continental		Other		Total	
Club	Season	Division	Apps	Goals	Apps	Goals	Apps	Goals	Apps	Goals	Apps	Goals	Apps	Goals	Apps	Goals
Flamengo	2018	Série A	0	0	2	0	0	0	—		0	0	—		2	0
Flamengo	2019	Série A	0	0	—		0	0	—		—		—		0	0
Flamengo	2020	Série A	0	0	3	0	0	0	—		0	0	0	0	3	0
Flamengo	Total		0	0	5	0	0	0	—		0	0	0	0	5	0
Leixões	2020–21	Liga Portugal 2	6	0	—		1	0	—		—		—		7	0
Leixões	2021–22	Liga Portugal 2	28	6	—		2	0	1	0	—		—		31	6
Leixões	Total		34	6	—		3	0	1	0	—		—		38	6
Covilhã (loan)	2020–21	Liga Portugal 2	9	1	—		—		—		—		—		9	1
Porto B	2022–23	Liga Portugal 2	29	8	—		—		—		—		—		29	8
Porto B	2023–24	Liga Portugal 2	30	18	—		—		—		—		—		30	18
Porto B	Total		59	26	—		—		—		—		—		59	26
Porto	2022–23	Primeira Liga	0	0	—		0	0	1	0	0	0	0	0	1	0
Porto	2023–24	Primeira Liga	0	0	—		1	0	0	0	0	0	0	0	1	0
Porto	Total		0	0	—		1	0	1	0	0	0	0	0	2	0
Santos (loan)	2024	Série B	16	4	—		—		—		—		—		16	4
Santos (loan)	2025	Série A	0	0	3	0	0	0	—		—		—		3	0
Santos (loan)	Total		16	4	3	0	0	0	—		—		—		19	4
Santa Clara (loan)	2024–25	Primeira Liga	6	2	—		—		—		—		—		6	2
Santa Clara	2025–26	Primeira Liga	12	0	—		1	0	—		6 (Note: Appearances in UEFA Conference League)	1	—		19	1
Career total			136	39	8	0	5	0	2	0	6	0	0	0	156	40

== Honours ==
Flamengo

- Copa São Paulo de Futebol Júnior: 2018
- Campeonato Carioca: 2020

Porto

- Taça da Liga: 2022–23

Santos

- Campeonato Brasileiro Série B: 2024

Individual

- Liga Portugal 2 Player of the Month: October/November 2023
- Liga Portugal 2 Forward of the Month: October/November 2023
- Liga Portugal 2 Goal of the Month: February 2023
