= Rómulo Otero =

Venezuelan footballer (born 1992)

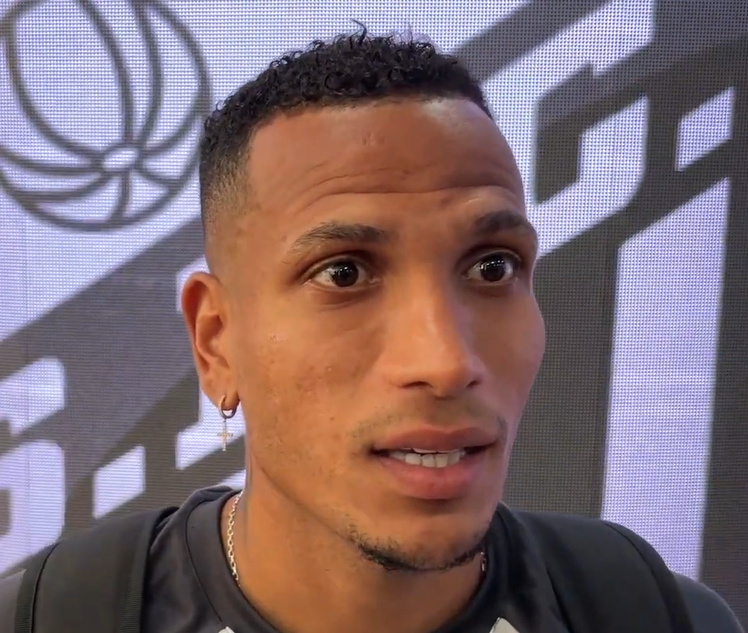
- Otero in 2024

Personal information
- Full name: Rómulo Otero Vásquez
- Date of birth: 9 November 1992 (age 34)
- Place of birth: Caracas, Venezuela
- Height: 1.66 m (5 ft 5 in)
- Position: Attacking midfielder

Team information
- Current team: Criciúma
- Number: 91

Youth career
- 2008–2009: Caracas

Senior career*
Years	Team	Apps	(Gls)
2009–2010	Caracas B	12	(4)
2009–2016	Caracas	105	(20)
2015–2016	→ Huachipato (loan)	11	(3)
2016–2017	Huachipato	10	(5)
2016–2017	→ Atlético Mineiro (loan)	13	(2)
2017–2021	Atlético Mineiro	55	(12)
2018–2019	→ Al-Wehda (loan)	25	(5)
2020–2021	→ Corinthians (loan)	24	(2)
2021–2022	Cruz Azul	11	(0)
2022	Fortaleza	7	(1)
2023	Aucas	25	(2)
2024	Santos	51	(8)
2025	Nacional Montevideo	29	(4)
2026-	Criciúma	4	(1)

International career^{‡}
2013–	Venezuela	49	(6)
- * Club domestic league appearances and goals as of 15 April 2026 ‡ National team caps and goals as of 23:31, 16 November 2023 (UTC)

Rómulo Otero Vásquez (born 9 November 1992) is a Venezuelan footballer who plays for Criciúma. Mainly an attacking midfielder, he can also play as a winger.

== Early life ==
Otero is the son of former Colombian player Rómulo Otero Córdoba, and was born in Caracas during his father's stint at Anzoátegui. His father died when he was three years old, and he started to live with another former footballer, Horacio "Chango" Cárdenas, in El Tigre.

== Club career ==
=== Caracas ===
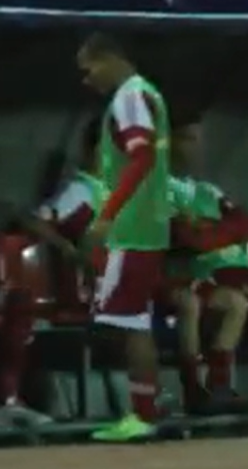
Otero with Caracas in 2014

Otero joined the youth sides of Caracas FC at the age of 15, and made his senior debut on 3 September 2009, coming on as a second-half substitute for Jesús Gómez in a 1–1 Primera División away draw against Llaneros. He spent most of the campaign playing for the B-team in Segunda División, but featured in another two first-team matches.

Definitely promoted to the first team in 2010, Otero scored his first professional goal on 12 December of that year, netting the opener in a 3–0 away win over Zamora. He subsequently started to become a regular starter for the club, becoming one of their captains in 2013.

=== Huachipato ===
In August 2015, Otero moved abroad and was loaned to Chilean club Huachipato until July 2016, with a buyout clause. He made his debut with the club on 8 August, replacing Mikel Arguinarena and scoring the equalizer in a 2–1 home win over Deportes Iquique.

In February 2016, Otero's buyout clause was activated by Huachipato, and he finished the season with eight goals in just 21 appearances.

=== Atlético Mineiro ===
On 19 July 2016, Otero was announced at Série A side Atlético Mineiro on loan. He made his debut for the club on 4 August, replacing Robinho in a 2–1 away win over São Paulo, and scored his first goal in Brazil on 12 September, netting his team's second in a 3–2 away loss to Fluminense.

On 4 April 2017, Galo acquired 50% of Otero's economic rights for a rumoured fee of US$ 1.5 million, with the player signing a contract until 2020.

==== Loan to Al-Wehda ====
On 28 May 2018, after losing his starting spot, Otero joined Saudi club Al-Wehda on loan from Atlético. On 29 November 2018, the club expressed the intention of signing Otero on a permanent basis, but the deal ultimately did not go through.

==== Return from loan ====
Back to Atlético in July 2019, Otero featured regularly for the remainder of the year, but saw his playing time being drastically reduced in the 2020 season. In July 2020, however, his contract with Galo was renewed.

==== Loan to Corinthians ====
On 24 August 2020, Otero was loaned to fellow top tier side Corinthians until July 2021; he also became the first Venezuelan player to play for the club. He immediately became a starter for, but left on 1 July 2021 after losing his spot in the starting XI.

=== Cruz Azul ===
On 3 August 2021, free agent Otero signed a one-year deal with Liga MX side Cruz Azul. He managed to start in only one league match for the club, and left after his contract expired.

=== Fortaleza ===
On 2 July 2022, Fortaleza announced the signing of Otero until the end of the year. He scored once for the club, in a 1–1 home draw against Atlético Goianiense.

=== Aucas ===
On 25 March 2023, Otero was announced at Aucas.

=== Santos ===
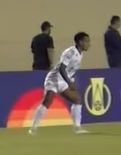
Otero playing for Santos in 2024

On 29 December 2023, Otero returned to Brazil after being announced at Série B side Santos on a one-year contract. He made his debut for the club the following 20 January, replacing Pedrinho and scoring the winner in a 1–0 away win over Botafogo-SP.

=== Nacional Montevideo ===
On 30 December 2024, Otero switched teams and countries again, after being announced at Nacional Montevideo in Uruguay.

== International career ==
Otero received his first call-up for the Venezuela national team on 9 March 2013, for two 2014 FIFA World Cup qualifiers against Argentina and Colombia. He made his full international debut thirteen days later, replacing Luis Manuel Seijas in a 3–0 loss against the former.

Otero scored his first goal for La Vinotinto on 10 September 2013, netting the third in a 3–2 win over Peru.

== Career statistics ==
=== Club ===
As of 26 November 2024.

Club	Season	League			Cup		Continental		State League		Other		Total	
Club	Season	Division	Apps	Goals	Apps	Goals	Apps	Goals	Apps	Goals	Apps	Goals	Apps	Goals
Caracas B	2009–10	Venezuelan Segunda División	12	4	—		—		—		—		12	4
Caracas	2009–10	Venezuelan Primera División	3	0	—		—		—		—		3	0
Caracas	2010–11	Venezuelan Primera División	9	1	—		1 (Note: Appearance(s) in Copa Libertadores)	0	—		—		10	1
Caracas	2011–12	Venezuelan Primera División	15	1	—		2	0	—		—		17	1
Caracas	2012–13	Venezuelan Primera División	29	4	—		6	0	—		—		35	4
Caracas	2013–14	Venezuelan Primera División	30	6	—		2	0	—		—		32	6
Caracas	2014–15	Venezuelan Primera División	22	8	—		4 (Note: Appearance(s) in Copa Sudamericana)	1	—		—		26	9
Caracas	Total		108	20	—		18	1	—		—		126	21
Huachipato	2015–16	Chilean Primera División	21	8	1	0	1	0	—		—		23	8
Atlético Mineiro	2016	Série A	13	2	5	1	—		—		—		18	3
Atlético Mineiro	2017	Série A	28	8	4	1	8	1	13 (Note: Appearance(s) in Campeonato Mineiro)	3	2 (Note: Appearance(s) in Primeira Liga)	1	55	14
Atlético Mineiro	2018	Série A	7	1	7	3	2	0	12	0	—		28	4
Atlético Mineiro	2019	Série A	20	3	2	0	5	0	—		—		27	3
Atlético Mineiro	2020	Série A	0	0	1	0	1	1	5	1	—		7	2
Atlético Mineiro	Total		68	14	19	5	16	2	30	4	2	1	135	26
Al-Wehda (loan)	2018–19	Saudi Pro League	25	5	2	0	—		—		—		27	5
Corinthians (loan)	2020	Série A	24	2	—		—		—		—		24	2
Corinthians (loan)	2021	Série A	0	0	2	1	4	0	11 (Note: Appearance(s) in Campeonato Paulista)	1	—		17	2
Corinthians (loan)	Total		24	2	2	1	4	0	11	1	—		41	4
Cruz Azul	2021–22	Liga MX	11	0	0	0	4 (Note: Appearance(s) in CONCACAF Champions Cup)	1	—		1 (Note: Appearance(s) in Campeones Cup)	0	16	1
Fortaleza	2022	Série A	7	1	2	0	—		—		—		9	1
Aucas	2023	Ecuadorian Serie A	25	2	0	0	6	2	—		—		31	4
Santos	2024	Série B	37	5	—		—		14	3	—		51	8
Nacional Montevideo	2025	Uruguayan Primera División	0	0	0	0	0	0	—		—		0	0
Career total			338	61	26	6	49	6	55	8	3	1	471	82

=== International ===
As of match played 16 November 2023

Appearances and goals by national team and year
National team	Year	Apps	Goals
Venezuela	2013	4	1
Venezuela	2014	3	1
Venezuela	2015	2	0
Venezuela	2016	11	3
Venezuela	2017	6	1
Venezuela	2018	3	0
Venezuela	2019	4	0
Venezuela	2020	4	0
Venezuela	2021	5	0
Venezuela	2022	3	0
Venezuela	2023	4	0
Total		49	6

=== International goals ===
No.	Date	Venue	Opponent	Score	Result	Competition	Ref.
1.	10 September 2013	Estadio José Antonio Anzoátegui, Puerto La Cruz, Venezuela	Peru	3–1	3–2	2014 World Cup qualification	
2.	5 March 2014	Estadio Olímpico Metropolitano, San Pedro Sula, Honduras	Honduras	1–1	2–1	Friendly	
3.	24 March 2016	Estadio Nacional, Lima, Peru	Peru	1–0	2–2	2018 World Cup qualification	
4.	29 March 2016	Estadio Agustín Tovar, Barinas, Venezuela	Chile	1–0	1–4	2018 World Cup qualification	
5.	10 November 2016	Estadio Monumental de Maturín, Maturín, Venezuela	Bolivia	5–0	5–0	2018 World Cup qualification	
6.	23 March 2017	Estadio Monumental de Maturín, Maturín, Venezuela	Peru	2–0	2–2	2018 World Cup qualification	

== Honours ==
Caracas

- Venezuelan Primera División: 2009–10

Atlético Mineiro

- Campeonato Mineiro: 2017

Santos

- Campeonato Brasileiro Série B: 2024

Individual

- Saudi Professional League Player of the Month: October 2018
