= Diógenes (footballer, born 2001) =

Brazilian footballer

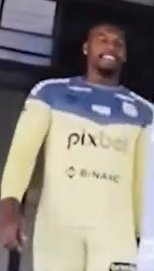
- Diógenes with Santos in 2023

Personal information
- Full name: Diógenes Vinicius da Silva
- Date of birth: 6 January 2001 (age 25)
- Place of birth: Itapecerica da Serra, Brazil
- Height: 1.90 m (6 ft 3 in)
- Position: Goalkeeper

Team information
- Current team: Santos
- Number: 1

Youth career
- 2016–2017: Taboão da Serra
- 2018–2019: Internacional
- 2020: Avaí
- 2020–2022: Santos

Senior career*
Years	Team	Apps	(Gls)
2022–	Santos	13	(0)
- * Club domestic league appearances and goals as of 17:20, 19 November 2026 (UTC)

Diógenes Vinicius da Silva (born 6 January 2001), simply known as Diógenes, is a Brazilian footballer who plays as a goalkeeper for Santos.

== Career ==
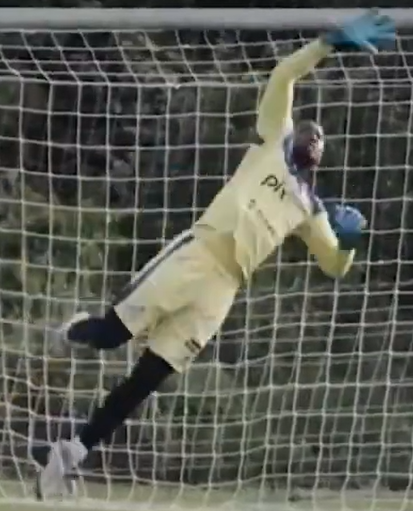
Diógenes training with Santos in 2023

Born in Itapecerica da Serra, São Paulo, Diógenes began his career as a centre-back, but soon moved to goal. He played for the youth sides of Taboão da Serra, Internacional and Avaí before agreeing to join Santos in August 2020; he was only registered in October, after the club's transfer ban was lifted.

Promoted to the first team in February 2021, Diógenes became a third-choice in July, behind João Paulo and John. On 13 August, after becoming an immediate backup as John suffered an injury, he renewed his contract with the club until the end of 2024.

Diógenes ended the 2021 season as third-choice after the arrival of Jandrei, and remained in that role in the following year, after John recovered. In September 2022, he was separated from the first team squad due to "indiscipline", but was reintegrated into the squad in the following month.

After spending the 2023 season behind João Paulo and Vladimir, Diógenes was one of the several players deemed surplus to requirements for the 2024 campaign, after the club's first-ever relegation. On 15 January 2024, however, he was again reintegrated, being now second-choice.

Diógenes later became a third-choice after the arrival of Gabriel Brazão, but was again a backup after João Paulo suffered an injury. On 21 August 2024, he renewed his contract with Santos until the end of 2026.

Diógenes made his first team debut with Peixe on 28 October 2024, starting in a 2–0 Série B home win over Ituano. He made his Série A debut the following 12 September, coming on as a second-half substitute for injured Brazão and providing several key stops to secure a 1–1 away draw against Atlético Mineiro.

An immediate backup to Brazão, Diógenes further extended his link with Santos until the end of 2028 on 9 April 2026.

== Career statistics ==
As of 19 November 2026.

Club	Season	League			State League		Cup		Continental		Other		Total	
Club	Season	Division	Apps	Goals	Apps	Goals	Apps	Goals	Apps	Goals	Apps	Goals	Apps	Goals
Santos	2021	Série A	0	0	0	0	0	0	0	0	2 (Note: Appearance(s) in Copa Paulista)	0	2	0
Santos	2022	Série A	0	0	0	0	0	0	0	0	—		0	0
Santos	2023	Série A	0	0	0	0	0	0	0	0	—		0	0
Santos	2024	Série B	1	0	0	0	—		—		—		1	0
Santos	2025	Série A	1	0	0	0	0	0	—		—		1	0
Santos	2026	Série A	11	0	0	0	1	0	0	0	—		12	0
Career total			13	0	0	0	1	0	0	0	2	0	16	0

== Honours ==
Santos

- Campeonato Brasileiro Série B: 2024
