= Patrick (footballer, born 1999) =

Brazilian footballer

Personal information
- Full name: Patrick Marcos de Sousa Freitas
- Date of birth: 9 April 1999 (age 27)
- Place of birth: Ferraz de Vasconcelos, Brazil
- Height: 1.83 m (6 ft 0 in)
- Position: Centre-back

Team information
- Current team: Novorizontino
- Number: 4

Youth career
- 2014–2015: EC São Bernardo
- 2016–2017: Flamengo-SP
- 2018–2019: Portuguesa

Senior career*
| Years | Team | Apps | (Gls) |
| 2019–2024 | Portuguesa | 55 | (7) |
| 2022 | → ABC (loan) | 12 | (0) |
| 2024 | → Novorizontino (loan) | 9 | (0) |
| 2024– | Novorizontino | 102 | (2) |
- * Club domestic league appearances and goals as of 17 November 2026

Patrick Marcos de Sousa Freitas (born 9 April 1999), simply known as Patrick, is a Brazilian footballer who plays as a central defender for Novorizontino.

== Club career ==
Patrick was born in Ferraz de Vasconcelos, São Paulo, and joined Portuguesa's youth setup in 2018, after representing Flamengo-SP and EC São Bernardo. He made his senior debut with the former on 3 March 2019, coming on as a late substitute for Cesinha in a 3–0 Campeonato Paulista Série A2 away win over Taubaté.

Patrick scored his first senior goal on 24 March 2019, netting the opener in a 2–1 home win over Votuporanguense. A backup option in his first years, he became a starter in the 2021 Série D.

Patrick helped Lusa to win the 2022 Paulista A2 as a starter, being named the best defender of the competition. On 20 April 2022, he renewed his contract until August 2025, and agreed to a loan deal with Série C side ABC; his new club confirmed the deal two days later.

Back to Lusa for the 2023 season, Patrick was again a starter after recovering from an injury. On 10 April 2024, he was loaned to Série B side Novorizontino until the end of the year, with a buyout clause.

== Career statistics ==
As of 8 August 2024

| Club | Season | League | | | State League | | Cup | | Continental | | Other | | Total | |
| Club | Season | Division | Apps | Goals | Apps | Goals | Apps | Goals | Apps | Goals | Apps | Goals | Apps | Goals |
|---|---|---|---|---|---|---|---|---|---|---|---|---|---|---|
| Portuguesa | 2019 | Paulista A2 | — | | 3 | 1 | — | | — | | 2 (Note: Appearance(s) in Copa Paulista) | 0 | 5 | 1 |
| Portuguesa | 2020 | Paulista A2 | — | | 0 | 0 | — | | — | | 8 | 0 | 8 | 0 |
| Portuguesa | 2021 | Série D | 13 | 2 | 5 | 0 | — | | — | | 2 | 0 | 20 | 2 |
| Portuguesa | 2022 | Paulista A2 | — | | 17 | 3 | — | | — | | — | | 17 | 3 |
| Portuguesa | 2023 | Paulista | — | | 6 | 0 | — | | — | | 12 | 0 | 18 | 0 |
| Portuguesa | 2023 | Paulista | — | | 11 | 1 | — | | — | | — | | 11 | 1 |
| Portuguesa | Total | | 13 | 2 | 42 | 5 | — | | — | | 24 | 0 | 79 | 7 |
| ABC (loan) | 2022 | Série C | 12 | 0 | — | | — | | — | | — | | 12 | 0 |
| Novorizontino | 2024 | Série B | 9 | 0 | — | | — | | — | | — | | 9 | 0 |
| Career total | | | 34 | 2 | 42 | 5 | 0 | 0 | 0 | 0 | 24 | 0 | 100 | 7 |

== Honours ==
=== Club ===
Portuguesa

- Copa Paulista: 2020
- Campeonato Paulista Série A2: 2022

Novorizontino

- Campeonato Brasileiro Série B: 2026

=== Individual ===
- Campeonato Paulista Série A2 Best XI: 2022
