= Anderson Leite =

Brazilian footballer (born 1993)

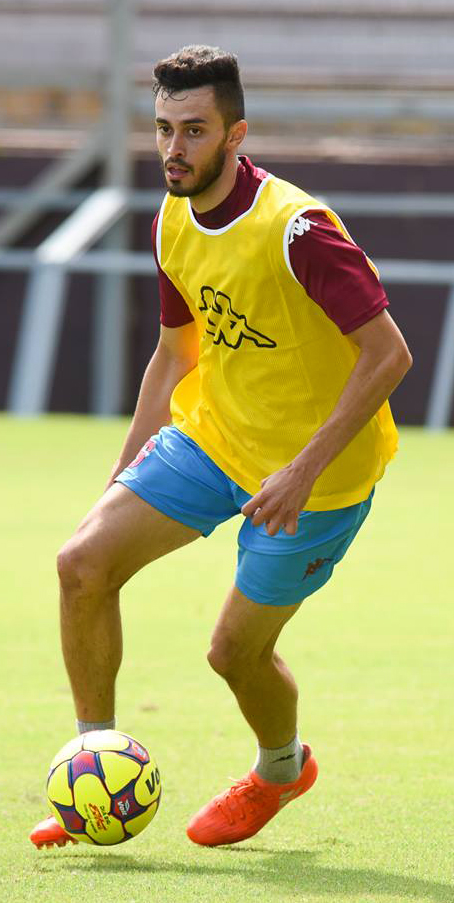

Personal information
- Full name: Anderson Leite Morais
- Date of birth: 4 May 1993 (age 33)
- Place of birth: São Paulo, Brazil
- Height: 1.83 m (6 ft 0 in)
- Position: Midfielder

Team information
- Current team: Paysandu
- Number: 29

Youth career
- Rio Preto
- –2011: Iraty
- 2012–2013: Londrina

Senior career*
Years	Team	Apps	(Gls)
2011	Iraty	1	(0)
2012–2021	Londrina	81	(10)
2015	→ Atlético Goianiense (loan)	10	(0)
2017	→ Saprissa (loan)	24	(2)
2020–2021	→ Chapecoense (loan)	36	(1)
2021–2022	Chapecoense	31	(2)
2022	→ Juárez (loan)	9	(1)
2022	Juventude	2	(0)
2023	CRB	23	(1)
2024–2025	Guarani	48	(1)
2025–	Paysandu	16	(1)
- * Club domestic league appearances and goals as of 19 December 2025

Anderson Leite Morais (born 4 May 1993) is a Brazilian footballer who plays as a midfielder for Paysandu.

== Club career ==
Anderson Leite was loaned to Costa Rican side Deportivo Saprissa in January 2017.

== Career statistics ==
As of 15 October 2021.

Club	Season	League			State League		Cup		Continental		Other		Total	
Club	Season	Division	Apps	Goals	Apps	Goals	Apps	Goals	Apps	Goals	Apps	Goals	Apps	Goals
Iraty	2011	Paranaense	—		1	0	—		—		—		1	0
Londrina	2012	Paranaense	—		0	0	—		—		—		0	0
Londrina	2013	Série D	0	0	0	0	—		—		—		0	0
Londrina	2014	Série D	13	3	7	0	2	1	—		—		22	4
Londrina	2015	Série C	0	0	9	0	0	0	—		—		9	0
Londrina	2016	Série B	15	1	5	0	1	0	—		—		21	1
Londrina	2017	Série B	0	0	0	0	0	0	—		—		0	0
Londrina	2018	Série B	5	0	5	1	0	0	—		—		10	1
Londrina	2019	Série B	16	3	6	2	4	0	—		—		26	5
Londrina	Total		49	7	32	3	7	1	—		—		82	11
Atlético Goianiense (loan)	2015	Série B	10	0	—		—		—		—		10	0
Saprissa (loan)	2016–17	Liga FPD	5	0	—		0	0	2 (Note: Appearances in the CONCACAF Champions League)	0	—		7	0
Saprissa (loan)	2017–18	Liga FPD	19	2	—		0	0	—		—		19	2
Saprissa (loan)	Total		24	2	—		0	0	2	0	—		26	2
Chapecoense	2020	Série B	26	1	10	0	2	0	—		—		38	1
Chapecoense	2021	Série A	18	1	13	1	1	0	—		—		32	2
Chapecoense	Total		44	2	23	1	3	0	—		—		70	3
Career total			136	11	56	4	10	1	2	0	0	0	204	16
