= Pedrinho (footballer, born 1999) =

Brazilian footballer

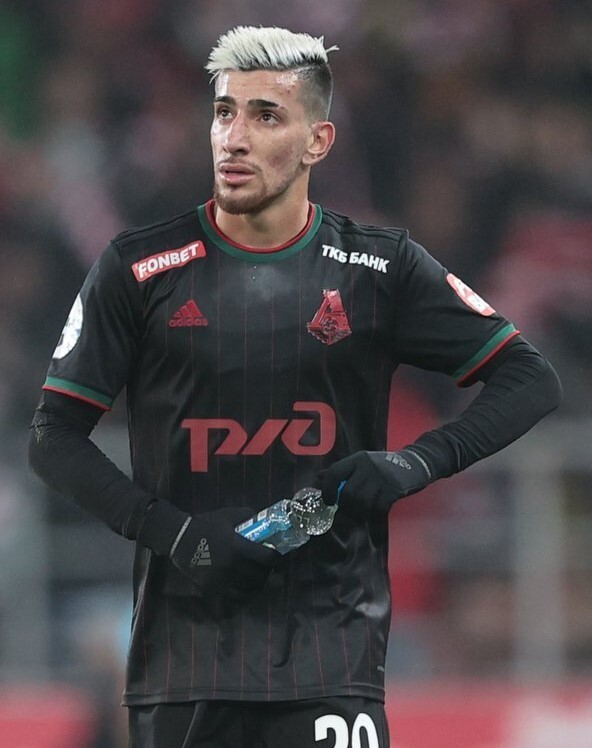
- Pedrinho with Lokomotiv Moscow in 2022

Personal information
- Full name: Pedro Gabriel Pereira Lopes
- Date of birth: 10 November 1999 (age 27)
- Place of birth: São Paulo, Brazil
- Height: 1.76 m (5 ft 9 in)
- Position: Forward

Team information
- Current team: São Bernardo
- Number: 29

Youth career
- 2014–2015: Anhanguera
- 2016: Juventus-SP
- 2017: Grêmio Osasco
- 2017: Audax

Senior career*
Years	Team	Apps	(Gls)
2017–2019	Audax	1	(0)
2017–2019	→ Oeste (loan)	48	(9)
2019–2020	Oeste	7	(1)
2019–2020	→ Athletico Paranaense (loan)	15	(6)
2020–2021	Athletico Paranaense	9	(0)
2020–2021	→ Oeste (loan)	17	(6)
2021–2022	Red Bull Bragantino	24	(1)
2022	→ América Mineiro (loan)	19	(4)
2022–2025	Lokomotiv Moscow	6	(0)
2023	→ São Paulo (loan)	10	(3)
2023	→ América Mineiro (loan)	8	(0)
2024	→ Santos (loan)	30	(2)
2025	→ Cuiabá (loan)	16	(3)
2026–	São Bernardo	33	(6)
- * Club domestic league appearances and goals as of 18 November 2026

Pedro Gabriel Pereira Lopes (born 10 November 1999), commonly known as Pedrinho, is a Brazilian professional footballer who plays as a forward for São Bernardo.

== Career ==
=== Audax ===
Born in São Paulo, Pedrinho joined Audax after impressing in an evaluation at the club's affiliated side Grêmio Osasco. He made his senior debut on 23 July 2017, aged only 17, coming on as a second-half substitute in a 1–1 Copa Paulista home draw against Rio Branco-SP.

=== Oeste ===
Pedrinho joined Oeste in August 2017, on loan until December 2018. He made his professional debut for the club on 7 October, replacing Betinho in a 3–0 home defeat of Guarani for the Série B championship.

Pedrinho became a regular starter during the 2018 season, and scored his first senior goal on 17 March in a 1–0 Campeonato Paulista Série A2 away win against Batatais. After helping his side achieve promotion to Campeonato Paulista, he was also a regular starter in the Série B, scoring five goals as his side narrowly avoided relegation.

Pedrinho returned to Audax for the 2019 campaign, but was bought outright by Oeste in February, signing a contract until 2024.

=== Athletico Paranaense ===
On 7 May 2019, Pedrinho was loaned out to Athletico Paranaense, initially playing for the U23 team. He made his Série A debut on 11 August, replacing Léo Cittadini in a 2–1 away loss to Botafogo.

On 10 August 2020, after being the club's top goalscorer in the 2020 Campeonato Paranaense with six goals, Pedrinho was bought by Furacão and signed a three-year contract. On 7 November, however, he returned to Oeste on loan for the remainder of the 2020 Série B.

On 5 March 2021, however, the move to Athletico was undone, with the R$ 5 million transfer fee being returned.

=== Red Bull Bragantino ===
On 15 March 2021, Pedrinho signed a contract with Red Bull Bragantino until 2025. He was mainly a backup option at his new club, behind starters Helinho and Tomás Cuello.

==== América Mineiro (loan) ====
On 18 February 2022, Pedrinho was loaned to fellow top tier side América Mineiro until the end of the year. He scored eight goals overall for the club, helping to a mid-table finish.

=== Lokomotiv Moscow ===
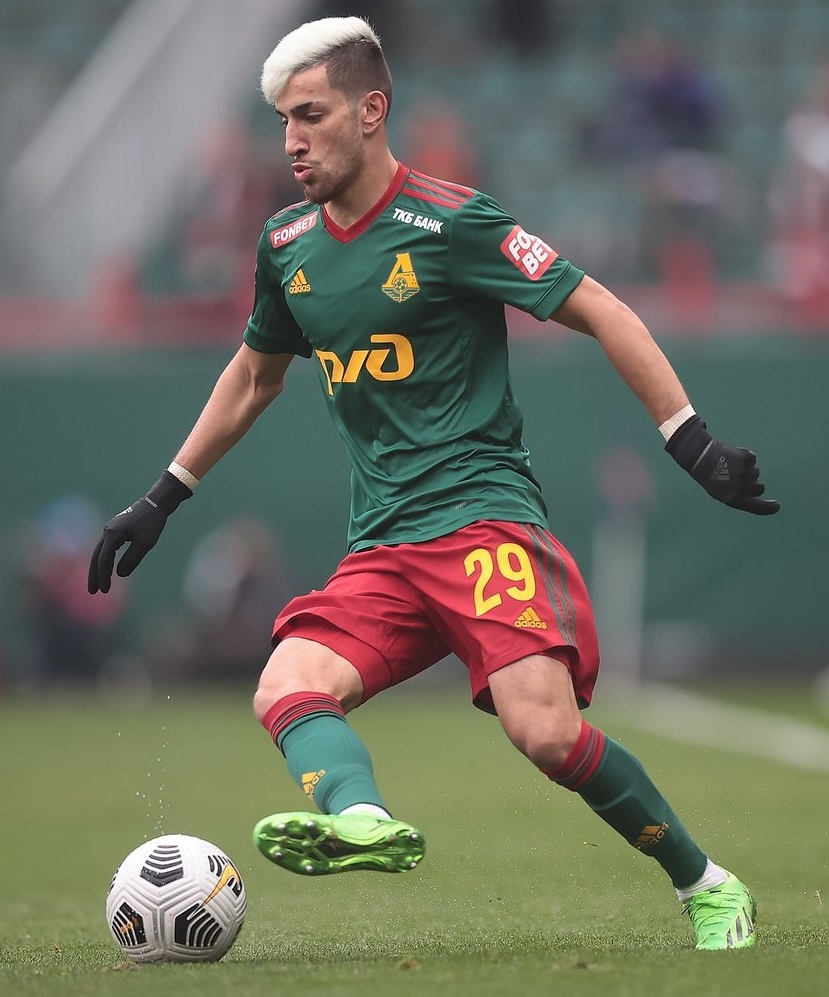
Pedrinho in action for Lokomotiv Moscow in 2022

On 8 September 2022, Pedrinho signed a four-year, €5 million, contract with Lokomotiv Moscow in Russia. He was not allowed to have his common name printed on his Lokomotiv Moscow shirt, because it sounds similar to a Russian homophobic pejorative.

On 28 September 2022, Pedrinho scored his first goals for Lokomotiv, netting 4 goals in a 5–0 Russian Cup victory over FC Khimki.

==== São Paulo (loan) ====
On 7 December 2022, Lokomotiv announced that Pedrinho had agreed to a one-year loan to São Paulo, effective as of 1 January. On 28 April 2023, Pedrinho's loan contract with São Paulo was terminated, after prints from conversations where Pedrinho threatened his ex-partner were disclosed.

==== Return to América Mineiro (loan) ====
On 4 July 2023, Pedrinho returned on loan to América Mineiro until the end of the 2023 season. He only played 12 matches for the club in his second spell, however, as they suffered relegation.

==== Santos (loan) ====
On 11 January 2024, Pedrinho was announced at Santos on a loan deal until the end of the year. He made his debut for the club nine days later, starting in a 1–0 away win over Botafogo-SP.

Pedrinho scored his first goal for Peixe on 19 April 2024, netting his team's opener in a 2–0 home win over Paysandu.

==== Cuiabá (loan) ====
On 27 January 2025, Pedrinho was loaned to Cuiabá until the end of 2025, with an option to buy.

==== Release by Lokomotiv ====
On 26 August 2025, Pedrinho's contract with Lokomotiv was terminated by mutual consent.

== Outside football ==
=== Domestic abuse claims ===
On 1 March 2023, while playing for São Paulo, Pedrinho was accused of domestic abuse and assault by a former partner, and asked to be separated from the first team squad in the following day. On 19 April, Brazilian media outlets ge and UOL disclosed print screens from conversations where Pedrinho made death threats and cursed his former partner Amanda Nunes.

In June 2023, Pedrinho took a legal action against São Paulo, asking for his dismissal to be reverted; in that month Nunes and Pedrinho also appeared together on social media. In December, justice ruled in favor of São Paulo, alleging that he "lied to the club" by saying he did not assaulted or abused his partner, when print screens proved otherwise.

On 21 February 2024, Pedrinho's investigation was archived, after documents proving that Pedrinho himself was also injured in the process were presented. On 12 March, Nunes and Pedrinho announced her pregnancy through social media.

== Career statistics ==
As of 5 November 2024

Appearances and goals by club, season and competition
Club	Season	League			State League		National Cup		Continental		Other		Total	
Club	Season	Division	Apps	Goals	Apps	Goals	Apps	Goals	Apps	Goals	Apps	Goals	Apps	Goals
Audax	2017	Série D	0	0	—		—		—		2 (Note: Appearance(s) in Copa Paulista)	0	2	0
Audax	2019	Paulista A3	—		1	0	—		—		—		1	0
Audax	Total		0	0	1	0	—		—		2	0	3	0
Oeste	2017	Série B	3	0	—		—		—		—		3	0
Oeste	2018	Série B	33	5	12	4	1	0	—		—		46	9
Oeste	2019	Série B	0	0	7	1	—		—		—		7	1
Oeste	Total		36	5	19	5	1	0	—		—		56	10
Athletico Paranaense	2019	Série A	6	0	—		—		—		—		6	0
Athletico Paranaense	2020	Série A	9	0	9	6	0	0	0	0	0	0	18	6
Athletico Paranaense	Total		15	0	9	6	0	0	0	0	0	0	24	6
Oeste (loan)	2020	Série B	17	6	—		—		—		—		17	6
Red Bull Bragantino	2021	Série A	17	0	7	1	2	0	2 (Note: Appearance(s) in Copa Sudamericana)	0	—		28	1
América Mineiro (loan)	2022	Série A	19	4	—		6	2	9 (Note: Appearance(s) in Copa Libertadores)	2	—		34	8
Lokomotiv Moscow	2022–23	Russian Premier League	6	0	—		3	4	—		—		9	4
São Paulo (loan)	2023	Série A	0	0	10	3	0	0	0	0	—		10	3
América Mineiro (loan)	2023	Série A	8	0	—		2	0	2	0	—		12	0
Santos (loan)	2024	Série B	16	2	14	0	—		—		—		30	2
Career total			134	17	60	15	14	6	13	2	2	0	223	40

== Honours ==
Santos

- Campeonato Brasileiro Série B: 2024
