= Clube Atlético Taboão da Serra =

Taboão da Serra
- Full name: Clube Atlético Taboão da Serra
- Nickname(s): CATS
- Founded: December 12, 1985; 39 years ago
- Ground: Vereador José Ferez
- Capacity: 10,000
- President: Anderson Nóbrega
- 2019: Paulistão A3, 15th (relegated)
Home colors	Away colors

Clube Atlético Taboão da Serra, or simply Taboão da Serra, is a Brazilian football team based in Taboão da Serra, São Paulo, founded in 1985.

== History ==
The club was founded on December 12, 1985. Taboão da Serra won the Campeonato Paulista Série B2 in 2004, and the Campeonato Paulista Segunda Divisão in 2010.

== Honours ==
- Campeonato Paulista Série A4
  - Winners (1): 2010
- Campeonato Paulista Segunda Divisão
  - Winners (1): 2004

== Notable players ==
- (Brazil) Gabriel Paulista
- (Brazil) Adriano Gabiru
- (Brazil) Edílson Capetinha
- (Brazil) Túlio Maravilha
- (Brazil) Tuta
- (Brazil) Viola

== Stadium ==
Clube Atlético Taboão da Serra play their home games at Estádio Municipal Vereador José Ferez. The stadium has a maximum capacity of 10,000 people.
