= Gabriel Brazão =

Brazilian footballer (born 2000)

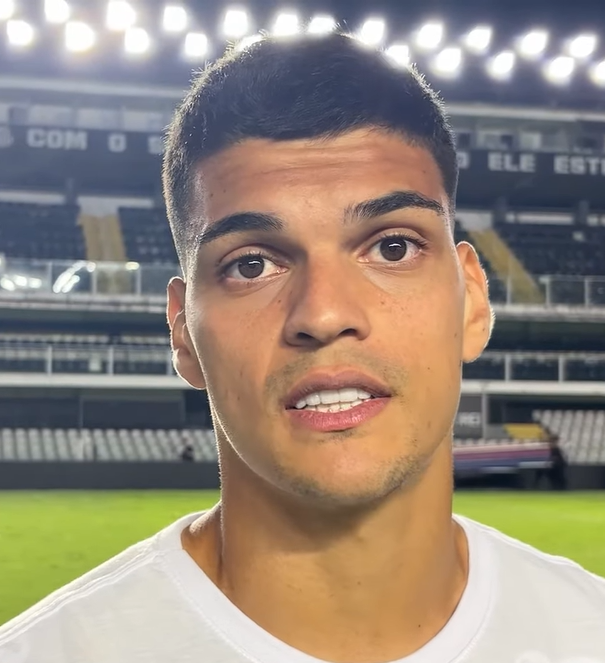
- Brazão in 2024

Personal information
- Full name: Gabriel Nascimento Resende Brazão
- Date of birth: 5 October 2000 (age 26)
- Place of birth: Uberlândia, Brazil
- Height: 1.92 m (6 ft 4 in)
- Position: Goalkeeper

Team information
- Current team: Santos
- Number: 77

Youth career
- Uberlândia
- 2014–2018: Cruzeiro

Senior career*
Years	Team	Apps	(Gls)
2018	Cruzeiro	0	(0)
2019	Parma	0	(0)
2019–2024	Inter Milan	0	(0)
2019–2020	→ Albacete (loan)	5	(0)
2020–2021	→ Oviedo (loan)	2	(0)
2022	→ Cruzeiro (loan)	0	(0)
2023	→ SPAL (loan)	1	(0)
2023–2024	→ Ternana (loan)	0	(0)
2024–	Santos	115	(0)

International career
2015	Brazil U15		
2016–2017	Brazil U17	20	(0)
2018–2019	Brazil U20	2	(0)
- * Club domestic league appearances and goals as of 22:08, 21 September 2026 (UTC)

Gabriel Nascimento Resende Brazão (born 5 October 2000) is a Brazilian professional footballer who plays as a goalkeeper for Santos.

== Club career ==
=== Early career ===
Born in Uberlândia, Minas Gerais, Brazão joined Cruzeiro's youth setup in March 2014, from hometown side Uberlândia. On 11 December 2017, he renewed his contract until 2021.

Despite training with the main squad during the 2018 season, Brazão was only a third-choice behind Fábio and fellow youth graduate Rafael.

=== Parma ===
On 31 January 2019, Brazão moved abroad and joined Italian Serie A side Parma. Cruzeiro reported €2.65 million from the sale of their 80% stake of Brazão. He spent the remainder of the campaign as a third-choice behind Luigi Sepe and Pierluigi Frattali.

=== Inter Milan ===
On 28 June 2018. Brazão signed a five-year deal with Inter Milan, with Andrea Adorante moving in the opposite direction.

==== 2019–20: loan to Albacete ====
On 19 July 2019, Brazão was loaned to Albacete in the Spanish Segunda División, for one year. He made his senior debut on 18 December, starting in a 1–0 away win against Tudelano, for the season's Copa del Rey.

Brazão made his Segunda División debut the following 29 February, as he played the full 90 minutes in a 1–1 home draw against Rayo Vallecano. However, he only featured in seven matches overall, being a backup to Tomeu Nadal.

==== 2020–21: loan to Oviedo ====
On 31 August 2020, Brazão joined Real Oviedo on a season-long loan, but was also a second-choice behind Joan Femenías. In January, after being deemed surplus to requirements by manager José Ángel Ziganda, he was reportedly seeking a move away from the club, but remained with the Carbayones until the end of the season.

==== 2021–22: injury and return to Cruzeiro ====
In August 2021, Brazão suffered an anterior cruciate ligament injury of his right knee, being sidelined for the majority of the campaign. On 3 March 2022, after more than a month training at the club, he was announced back at his first club Cruzeiro on loan until June 2023.

In March 2022, Brazão underwent surgery to nurse another injury in the meniscus of his left knee, In May, however, he tore his ACL in his left knee, being sidelined for the remainder of the year.

Brazão announced his departure from Cruzeiro in July 2022, again without playing a first team match for the club.

==== 2023: loan to SPAL ====
On 31 January 2023, after fully recovering, Brazão joined Serie B club SPAL on loan until the end of the season. A fourth-choice behind veterans Enrico Alfonso and Alberto Pomini and youth graduate Demba Thiam, he only featured in one match before leaving.

==== 2023–24: loan to Ternana ====
On 4 August 2023, Brazão joined fellow Serie B club Ternana on loan until the end of the season. However, he was unable to beat off competition from longtime incumbent Antony Iannarilli, and was sent back to Inter on 2 February 2024.

=== Santos ===
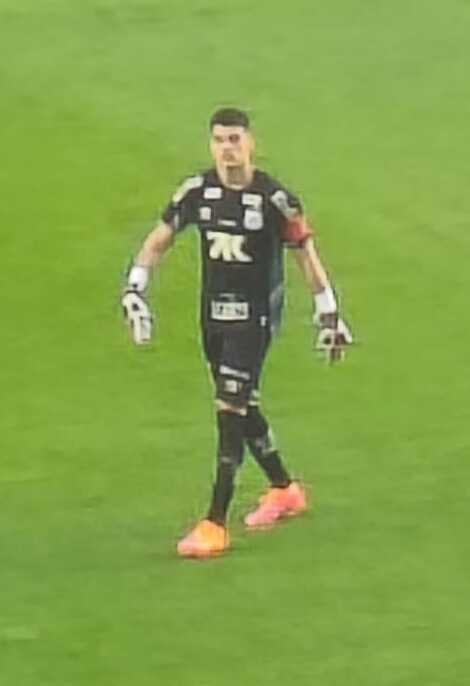
Brazão in action for Santos in 2025

On 27 February 2024, Brazão returned to his home country after being announced at Santos in the Série B, on a three-year contract. He reportedly had signed for the club on 30 January, but had to wait until their transfer ban was lifted.

Brazão played his first match in more than a year on 24 May 2024, replacing injured João Paulo in a 2–1 away loss to América Mineiro; it was also his debut for Peixe and his first senior match in his home country. He then became a first-choice for the side, helping in their promotion back to the top tier as champions, and renewed his contract until 2028 on 23 November.

On 11 March 2026, Brazão played his 100th match for Santos in a 2–2 away draw against Mirassol. In September, he underwent surgery due to a shoulder injury, being sidelined for the remainder of the year.

== International career ==
In 2015, Brazão was a part of the Brazil under-15 squad in the 2015 South American U-15 Championship, being a first-choice as they won the tournament. In 2017, he played with the under-17s in the 2017 South American U-17 Championship and the 2017 FIFA U-17 World Cup, winning the former competition and being named the best goalkeeper of the latter.

Brazão received his first call-up to the full side by head coach Tite on 26 October 2018, for two friendlies against Uruguay and Cameroon. He was, however, a third-choice behind Alisson and Ederson.

After featuring in two friendlies with the under-20 team in 2018, Brazão was called up to the 2019 South American U-20 Championship in December of that year. However, he spent the entire competition as a backup to Phelipe Megiolaro.

In 2020 and 2021, Brazão was called up to the under-23 squad, but did not play.

== Career statistics ==
As of 21 September 2026.

Appearances and goals by club, season and competition
Club	Season	League			State league (Note: Includes Campeonato Paulista)		Cup (Note: Includes Copa do Brasil, Coppa Italia, Copa del Rey)		Continental		Other		Total	
Club	Season	Division	Apps	Goals	Apps	Goals	Apps	Goals	Apps	Goals	Apps	Goals	Apps	Goals
Cruzeiro	2018	Série A	0	0	0	0	0	0	—		—		0	0
Parma	2018–19	Serie A	0	0	—		—		—		—		0	0
Inter Milan	2022–23	Serie A	0	0	—		0	0	0	0	0	0	0	0
Albacete (loan)	2019–20	Segunda División	5	0	—		2	0	—		—		7	0
Oviedo (loan)	2020–21	Segunda División	2	0	—		1	0	—		—		3	0
Cruzeiro (loan)	2022	Série B	0	0	0	0	0	0	—		—		0	0
SPAL (loan)	2022–23	Serie B	1	0	—		—		—		—		1	0
Ternana (loan)	2023–24	Serie B	0	0	—		0	0	—		—		0	0
Santos	2024	Série B	31	0	0	0	—		—		—		31	0
Santos	2025	Série A	38	0	13	0	2	0	—		—		53	0
Santos	2026	Série A	24	0	9	0	5	0	12 (Note: Appearance(s) in Copa Sudamericana)	0	—		50	0
Santos	Total		93	0	22	0	7	0	12	0	—		134	0
Career total			101	0	22	0	10	0	12	0	0	0	145	0

== Honours ==
Inter Milan

- Supercoppa Italiana: 2022

Santos

- Campeonato Brasileiro Série B: 2024

Brazil U15

- South American U-15 Championship: 2015

Brazil U17

- South American U-17 Championship: 2017

Individual

- FIFA U-17 World Cup Golden Glove: 2017
