= 2022 Campeonato Brasileiro Série A =

Football league

Campeonato Brasileiro Série A
- Season: 2022
- Dates: 9 April – 13 November 2022
- Champions: Palmeiras (11th title)
- Relegated: Ceará; Atlético Goianiense; Avaí; Juventude
- Copa Libertadores: Palmeiras; Internacional; Fluminense; Corinthians; Flamengo (via Copa Libertadores); Athletico Paranaense; Atlético Mineiro; Fortaleza
- Copa Sudamericana: São Paulo; América Mineiro; Botafogo; Santos; Goiás; Red Bull Bragantino
- Matches: 380
- Goals: 905 (2.38 per match)
- Top goalscorer: Germán Cano (26 goals)
- Biggest home win: Fortaleza 6–0 RB Bragantino (9 November)
- Biggest away win: Goiás 0–4 São Paulo (13 November)
- Highest scoring: Fluminense 5–3 Atlético-MG (8 June)
- Longest winning run: 6 games Flamengo; Palmeiras
- Longest unbeaten run: 22 games Palmeiras
- Longest winless run: 19 games Juventude
- Longest losing run: 8 games Avaí

The 2022 Campeonato Brasileiro Série A (officially the Brasileirão Assaí 2022 for sponsorship reasons) was the 66th season of the Campeonato Brasileiro Série A, the top level of professional football in Brazil, and the 20th edition in a double round-robin since its establishment in 2003. The competition began on 9 April and ended on 13 November 2022.

The top six teams as well as the 2022 Copa do Brasil champions qualified for the Copa Libertadores. The next six best-placed teams not qualified for Copa Libertadores qualified for the Copa Sudamericana and the last four were relegated to Série B for 2023.

Palmeiras won the competition, securing their eleventh league title with three rounds to go after Internacional's 1–0 defeat to América Mineiro on 2 November. Atlético Mineiro were the defending champions.

== Teams ==
Twenty teams competed in the league – the top sixteen teams from the previous season, as well as four teams promoted from the Série B.

Botafogo and Coritiba became the first two clubs to be promoted on 15 November 2021, after the former achieved a 2–1 home win against Operário Ferroviário, while the latter defeated Brasil de Pelotas by 2–1 a day before and saw CRB lose their match against Brusque. Goiás achieved promotion seven days later, after a 2–0 away win over fellow promotion contenders Guarani. Avaí was the last team promoted on 28 November, after a 2–1 comeback win over Sampaio Corrêa.

Location of teams in 2022 Série A

Pos.	Relegated from 2021 Série A
17th	Grêmio
18th	Bahia
19th	Sport
20th	Chapecoense

Pos.	Promoted from 2021 Série B
1st	Botafogo
2nd	Goiás
3rd	Coritiba
4th	Avaí

=== Number of teams by state ===
N.T.	State	Team(s)
5	São Paulo	Corinthians, Palmeiras, Red Bull Bragantino, Santos and São Paulo
3	Rio de Janeiro	Botafogo, Flamengo and Fluminense
2	Ceará	Ceará and Fortaleza
2	Goiás	Atlético Goianiense and Goiás
2	Minas Gerais	América Mineiro and Atlético Mineiro
2	Paraná	Athletico Paranaense and Coritiba
2	Rio Grande do Sul	Internacional and Juventude
1	Mato Grosso	Cuiabá
1	Santa Catarina	Avaí

=== Stadiums and locations ===
Team	Location	State	Stadium	Capacity
América Mineiro	Belo Horizonte	Minas Gerais	Independência	23,018
Athletico Paranaense	Curitiba	Paraná	Arena da Baixada	42,372
Atlético Goianiense	Goiânia	Goiás	Antônio Accioly	12,500
Atlético Mineiro	Belo Horizonte	Minas Gerais	Mineirão	61,846
Avaí	Florianópolis	Santa Catarina	Ressacada	17,826
Botafogo	Rio de Janeiro	Rio de Janeiro	Olímpico Nilton Santos	44,661
Ceará	Fortaleza	Ceará	Castelão	63,903
Corinthians	São Paulo	São Paulo	Neo Química Arena	47,605
Coritiba	Curitiba	Paraná	Couto Pereira	40,502
Cuiabá	Cuiabá	Mato Grosso	Arena Pantanal	44,000
Flamengo	Rio de Janeiro	Rio de Janeiro	Maracanã	78,838
Fluminense	Rio de Janeiro	Rio de Janeiro	Maracanã	78,838
Fortaleza	Fortaleza	Ceará	Castelão	63,903
Goiás	Goiânia	Goiás	Serrinha	14,450
Internacional	Porto Alegre	Rio Grande do Sul	Beira-Rio	50,128
Juventude	Caxias do Sul	Rio Grande do Sul	Alfredo Jaconi	19,924
Palmeiras	São Paulo	São Paulo	Allianz Parque	43,713
Red Bull Bragantino	Bragança Paulista	São Paulo	Nabi Abi Chedid	17,128
Santos	Santos	São Paulo	Vila Belmiro	16,068
São Paulo	São Paulo	São Paulo	Morumbi	72,039

== Personnel and kits ==
Team	Manager	Captain	Kit manufacturer	Shirt main sponsor
América Mineiro	(Brazil) Vagner Mancini	(Brazil) Juninho	Volt Sport	Pixbet
Athletico Paranaense	(Brazil) Luiz Felipe Scolari	(Brazil) Thiago Heleno	Umbro	Banco Inter
Atlético Goianiense	(Brazil) Eduardo Souza (caretaker)	(Brazil) Marlon Freitas	Dragão Premium (club manufactured kit)	Amuleto Bet
Atlético Mineiro	(Brazil) Cuca	(Brazil) Réver	Adidas	Betano
Avaí	(Brazil) Fabrício Bento (caretaker)	(Brazil) Bressan	Umbro	Pixbet
Botafogo	(Portugal) Luís Castro	(Argentina) Joel Carli	Club manufactured kit	Blaze
Ceará	(Brazil) Juca Antonello (caretaker)	(Brazil) Luiz Otávio	Vozão (club manufactured kit)	Zenir
Corinthians	(Portugal) Vítor Pereira	(Brazil) Cássio	Nike	Vitaminas Neo Química
Coritiba	(Brazil) Guto Ferreira	(Brazil) Willian Farias	Sou 1909 (club manufactured kit)	Neodent
Cuiabá	(Portugal) António Oliveira	(Brazil) Paulão	Umbro	Drebor
Flamengo	(Brazil) Dorival Júnior	(Brazil) Éverton Ribeiro	Adidas	Banco BRB
Fluminense	(Brazil) Fernando Diniz	(Brazil) Nino	Umbro	Betano
Fortaleza	(Argentina) Juan Pablo Vojvoda	(Brazil) Tinga	Leão1918 (club manufactured kit)	Zenir
Goiás	(Brazil) Jair Ventura	(Brazil) Elvis	Gr33n (club manufactured kit)	Pixbet
Internacional	(Brazil) Mano Menezes	(Brazil) Taison	Adidas	Banrisul
Juventude	(Brazil) Celso Roth	(Brazil) William Matheus	19treze (club manufactured kit)	Banrisul
Palmeiras	(Portugal) Abel Ferreira	(Paraguay) Gustavo Gómez	Puma	Crefisa
Red Bull Bragantino	(Brazil) Marcinho (caretaker)	(Brazil) Léo Ortiz	New Balance	Red Bull
Santos	(Brazil) Orlando Ribeiro (caretaker)	(Brazil) João Paulo	Umbro	Pixbet
São Paulo	(Brazil) Rogério Ceni	(Brazil) Diego Costa	Adidas	Sportsbet.io

=== Managerial changes ===
Team	Outgoing manager	Manner of departure	Date of vacancy	Position in table	Incoming manager	Date of appointment	Ref
Flamengo	(Brazil) Maurício Souza	End of caretaker spell	9 December 2021	Pre-season	(Portugal) Paulo Sousa	29 December 2021	
Fluminense	(Brazil) Marcão	Demoted to assistant manager	15 December 2021	Pre-season	(Brazil) Abel Braga	15 December 2021	
Internacional	(Uruguay) Diego Aguirre	Mutual agreement	15 December 2021	Pre-season	(Uruguay) Alexander Medina	27 December 2021	
Cuiabá	(Brazil) Jorginho	Contract ended	16 December 2021	Pre-season	(Brazil) Eduardo Oliveira (caretaker)	21 January 2022	
Atlético Mineiro	(Brazil) Cuca	Resigned	28 December 2021	Pre-season	(Argentina) Antonio Mohamed	13 January 2022	
Corinthians	(Brazil) Sylvinho	Sacked	3 February 2022	State leagues	(Brazil) Fernando Lázaro (caretaker)	4 February 2022	
Cuiabá	(Brazil) Eduardo Oliveira	End of caretaker spell	4 February 2022	State leagues	(Brazil) Pintado	4 January 2022	
Avaí	(Brazil) Claudinei Oliveira	Sacked	6 February 2022	State leagues	(Brazil) Fabrício Bento (caretaker)	7 February 2022	
Atlético Goianiense	(Brazil) Marcelo Cabo	Resigned	7 February 2022	State leagues	(Brazil) Eduardo Souza (caretaker)	7 February 2022	
Juventude	(Brazil) Jair Ventura	Sacked	11 February 2022	State leagues	(Brazil) Eduardo Barros (caretaker)	11 February 2022	
Botafogo	(Brazil) Enderson Moreira	Sacked	11 February 2022	State leagues	(Brazil) Lúcio Flávio (caretaker)	11 February 2022	
Avaí	(Brazil) Fabrício Bento	End of caretaker spell	13 February 2022	State leagues	(Brazil) Eduardo Barroca	13 February 2022	
Santos	(Brazil) Fábio Carille	Sacked	18 February 2022	State leagues	(Brazil) Marcelo Fernandes (caretaker)	18 February 2022	
Atlético Goianiense	(Brazil) Eduardo Souza	End of caretaker spell	21 February 2022	State leagues	(Brazil) Umberto Louzer	22 February 2022	
Corinthians	(Brazil) Fernando Lázaro	End of caretaker spell	23 February 2022	State leagues	(Portugal) Vítor Pereira	23 February 2022	
Goiás	(Brazil) Glauber Ramos	End of caretaker spell	24 February 2022	State leagues	(Brazil) Bruno Pivetti	24 February 2022	
Santos	(Brazil) Marcelo Fernandes	End of caretaker spell	25 February 2022	State leagues	(Argentina) Fabián Bustos	25 February 2022	
Juventude	(Brazil) Eduardo Barros	End of caretaker spell	3 March 2022	State leagues	(Brazil) Eduardo Baptista	3 March 2022	
Goiás	(Brazil) Bruno Pivetti	Sacked	24 March 2022	State leagues	(Brazil) Glauber Ramos (caretaker)	25 March 2022	
Ceará	(Brazil) Tiago Nunes	Sacked	25 March 2022	State leagues	(Brazil) Dorival Júnior	28 March 2022	
Botafogo	(Brazil) Lúcio Flávio	End of caretaker spell	25 March 2022	State leagues	(Portugal) Luís Castro	25 March 2022	
Athletico Paranaense	(Brazil) Alberto Valentim	Mutual agreement	10 April 2022	20th	(Brazil) Fábio Carille	13 April 2022	
América Mineiro	(Brazil) Marquinhos Santos	Mutual agreement	11 April 2022	16th	(Brazil) Vagner Mancini	12 April 2022	
Goiás	(Brazil) Glauber Ramos	End of caretaker spell	14 April 2022	19th	(Brazil) Jair Ventura	14 April 2022	
Internacional	(Uruguay) Alexander Medina	Sacked	15 April 2022	18th	(Brazil) Cauan de Almeida (caretaker)	15 April 2022	
Internacional	(Brazil) Cauan de Almeida	End of caretaker spell	19 April 2022	13th	(Brazil) Mano Menezes	19 April 2022	
Fluminense	(Brazil) Abel Braga	Resigned	28 April 2022	13th	(Brazil) Fernando Diniz (Note: Marcão was the caretaker manager on the 4th round against Coritiba.)	30 April 2022	
Athletico Paranaense	(Brazil) Fábio Carille	Sacked	4 May 2022	16th	(Brazil) Luiz Felipe Scolari (Note: Wesley Carvalho was the caretaker manager on the 5th round against Ceará.)	4 May 2022	
Cuiabá	(Brazil) Pintado	Sacked	12 May 2022	11th	(Brazil) Luiz Fernando Iubel (caretaker)	12 May 2022	
Atlético Goianiense	(Brazil) Umberto Louzer	Sacked	15 May 2022	19th	(Brazil) Jorginho	16 May 2022	
Cuiabá	(Brazil) Luiz Fernando Iubel	End of caretaker spell	4 June 2022	17th	(Portugal) António Oliveira (Note: Bernardo Franco was the caretaker manager on the 10th round against Corinthians.)	4 June 2022	
Flamengo	(Portugal) Paulo Sousa	Sacked	9 June 2022	14th	(Brazil) Dorival Júnior	10 June 2022	
Ceará	(Brazil) Dorival Júnior	Signed by Flamengo	10 June 2022	12th	(Brazil) Marquinhos Santos (Note: Pedro Sotero was the caretaker manager on the 11th round against Goiás.)	12 June 2022	
Juventude	(Brazil) Eduardo Baptista	Sacked	20 June 2022	20th	(Brazil) Umberto Louzer	22 June 2022	
Santos	(Argentina) Fabián Bustos	Sacked	7 July 2022	10th	(Brazil) Marcelo Fernandes (caretaker)	7 July 2022	
Santos	(Brazil) Marcelo Fernandes	End of caretaker spell	20 July 2022	9th	(Brazil) Lisca	19 July 2022	
Atlético Mineiro	(Argentina) Antonio Mohamed	Sacked	22 July 2022	3rd	(Brazil) Cuca (Note: Lucas Gonçalves was the caretaker manager on the 19th round against Corinthians.)	23 July 2022	
Coritiba	(Paraguay) Gustavo Morínigo	Sacked	14 August 2022	18th	(Brazil) Guto Ferreira	14 August 2022	
Ceará	(Brazil) Marquinhos Santos	Sacked	14 August 2022	14th	(Brazil) Juca Antonello (caretaker)	16 August 2022	
Ceará	(Brazil) Juca Antonello	End of caretaker spell	24 August 2022	15th	(Argentina) Lucho González	24 August 2022	
Atlético Goianiense	(Brazil) Jorginho	Sacked	27 August 2022	19th	(Brazil) Eduardo Baptista	28 August 2022	
Avaí	(Brazil) Eduardo Barroca	Sacked	12 September 2022	18th	(Brazil) Lisca	13 September 2022	
Santos	(Brazil) Lisca	Mutual agreement	12 September 2022	10th	(Brazil) Orlando Ribeiro (caretaker)	12 September 2022	
Atlético Goianiense	(Brazil) Eduardo Baptista	Mutual agreement	29 September 2022	19th	(Brazil) Eduardo Souza (caretaker)	29 September 2022	
Juventude	(Brazil) Umberto Louzer	Sacked	3 October 2022	20th	(Brazil) Lucas Zanella (caretaker)	3 October 2022	
Avaí	(Brazil) Lisca	Sacked	24 October 2022	19th	(Brazil) Fabrício Bento (caretaker)	24 October 2022	
Ceará	(Argentina) Lucho González	Sacked	28 October 2022	17th	(Brazil) Juca Antonello (caretaker)	28 October 2022	
Juventude	(Brazil) Lucas Zanella	End of caretaker spell	28 October 2022	20th	(Brazil) Celso Roth	28 October 2022	
Red Bull Bragantino	(Brazil) Maurício Barbieri	Sacked	10 November 2022	14th	(Brazil) Marcinho (caretaker)	10 November 2022	

=== Foreign players ===
The clubs can have a maximum of five foreign players in their Campeonato Brasileiro squads per match, but there is no limit of foreigners in the clubs' squads.

Club	Player 1	Player 2	Player 3	Player 4	Player 5	Player 6	Player 7	Player 8
América Mineiro	(Colombia) Juan Pablo Ramírez	(Argentina) Germán Conti	(Paraguay) Raúl Cáceres	(Argentina) Martín Benítez	(Uruguay) Gonzalo Mastriani	(Argentina) Emmanuel Martínez		
Athletico Paranaense	(Uruguay) David Terans	(Colombia) Nicolás Hernández	(Ecuador) Bryan García	(Argentina) Tomás Cuello	(Colombia) Luis Orejuela	(Uruguay) Agustín Canobbio		
Atlético Goianiense	(Argentina) Diego Churín							
Atlético Mineiro	(Argentina) Matías Zaracho	(Chile) Eduardo Vargas	(Argentina) Ignacio Fernández	(Paraguay) Júnior Alonso	(Argentina) Cristian Pavón			
Avaí	(Peru) Paolo Guerrero							
Botafogo	(Paraguay) Gatito Fernández	(Argentina) Joel Carli	(Argentina) Renzo Saravia	(Argentina) Víctor Cuesta	(Bolivia) Sebastian Joffre	(United States) Jacob Montes		
Ceará	(Colombia) Stiven Mendoza	(Colombia) Jhon Vásquez						
Corinthians	(Colombia) Víctor Cantillo	(Portugal) Rafael Ramos	(Uruguay) Bruno Méndez	(Paraguay) Fabián Balbuena	(Argentina) Fausto Vera			
Coritiba	(Uruguay) Pablo García	(Uruguay) Guillermo de los Santos	(Paraguay) Matías Galarza	(Argentina) Adrián Martínez	(Uruguay) Jesús Trindade	(Paraguay) Hernán Pérez	(Colombia) Juan Carlos Díaz	(Venezuela) Jhon Chancellor
Cuiabá	(Paraguay) Juan Ojeda	(Venezuela) Cristhian Rivas	(Colombia) Kelvin Osorio					
Flamengo	(Uruguay) Giorgian De Arrascaeta	(Chile) Arturo Vidal	(Chile) Erick Pulgar	(Uruguay) Guillermo Varela				
Fluminense	(Colombia) Jhon Arias	(Ecuador) Mario Pineida	(Argentina) Germán Cano	(Uruguay) Michel Araújo				
Fortaleza	(Argentina) Valentín Depietri	(Colombia) Brayan Ceballos	(Ecuador) Anthony Landázuri	(Argentina) Silvio Romero	(Venezuela) Rómulo Otero	(Argentina) Emanuel Brítez		
Goiás								
Internacional	(Argentina) Gabriel Mercado	(Argentina) Fabricio Bustos	(Uruguay) Carlos de Pena	(Argentina) Braian Romero				
Juventude	(Paraguay) Isidro Pitta	(Paraguay) Óscar Ruiz						
Palmeiras	(Paraguay) Gustavo Gómez	(Uruguay) Joaquín Piquerez	(Chile) Benjamín Kuscevic	(Colombia) Eduard Atuesta	(Uruguay) Miguel Merentiel	(Argentina) José Manuel López		
Red Bull Bragantino	(Ecuador) Leonardo Realpe	(Venezuela) Jan Carlos Hurtado	(Uruguay) Emiliano Martínez	(Ecuador) José Hurtado	(Argentina) Kevin Lomónaco			
Santos	(Uruguay) Carlos Sánchez	(Uruguay) Rodrigo Fernández	(Ecuador) Jhojan Julio	(Ecuador) Bryan Angulo	(Venezuela) Yeferson Soteldo	(Argentina) Gabriel Carabajal	(Bolivia) Miguel Terceros	
São Paulo	(Ecuador) Robert Arboleda	(Argentina) Jonathan Calleri	(Uruguay) Gabriel Neves	(Colombia) Andrés Colorado	(Argentina) Giuliano Galoppo	(Argentina) Nahuel Bustos	(Venezuela) Nahuel Ferraresi	

==== Players holding Brazilian dual nationality ====
They do not take foreign slot.

- (China) Aloísio (América Mineiro)
- (Ukraine) Marlos (Athletico Paranaense)
- (Ukraine) Júnior Moraes (Corinthians)
- (China) Alan (Fluminense)
- (United States) Johnny Cardoso (Internacional)
- (South Korea) Chico (Juventude)
- (Italy) André Anderson (São Paulo)
- (Italy) Éder (São Paulo)
- (Portugal) João Moreira (São Paulo)

== Standings ==
=== League table ===
Pos	Team	Pld	W	D	L	GF	GA	GD	Pts	Qualification or relegation
1	Palmeiras (C)	38	23	12	3	66	27	+39	81	Qualification for Copa Libertadores group stage (Note: Flamengo qualified for the Copa Libertadores group stage by winning the 2022 Copa Libertadores. Since they also won the 2022 Copa do Brasil, the berth awarded to the Copa do Brasil champions (Copa Libertadores group stage) was passed over to the league's best placed team not already qualified.)
2	Internacional	38	20	13	5	58	31	+27	73	Qualification for Copa Libertadores group stage
3	Fluminense	38	21	7	10	63	41	+22	70	Qualification for Copa Libertadores group stage
4	Corinthians	38	18	11	9	44	36	+8	65	Qualification for Copa Libertadores group stage
5	Flamengo	38	18	8	12	60	39	+21	62	Qualification for Copa Libertadores group stage
6	Athletico Paranaense	38	16	10	12	48	48	0	58	Qualification for Copa Libertadores group stage
7	Atlético Mineiro	38	15	13	10	45	37	+8	58	Qualification for Copa Libertadores second stage
8	Fortaleza	38	15	10	13	46	39	+7	55	Qualification for Copa Libertadores second stage
9	São Paulo	38	13	15	10	55	42	+13	54	Qualification for Copa Sudamericana group stage
10	América Mineiro	38	15	8	15	40	40	0	53	Qualification for Copa Sudamericana group stage
11	Botafogo	38	15	8	15	41	43	−2	53	Qualification for Copa Sudamericana group stage
12	Santos	38	12	11	15	44	41	+3	47	Qualification for Copa Sudamericana group stage
13	Goiás	38	11	13	14	40	53	−13	46	Qualification for Copa Sudamericana group stage
14	Red Bull Bragantino	38	11	11	16	49	59	−10	44	Qualification for Copa Sudamericana group stage
15	Coritiba	38	12	6	20	39	60	−21	42	
16	Cuiabá	38	10	11	17	31	42	−11	41	
17	Ceará (R)	38	7	16	15	34	41	−7	37	Relegation to Campeonato Brasileiro Série B
18	Atlético Goianiense (R)	38	8	12	18	39	57	−18	36	Relegation to Campeonato Brasileiro Série B
19	Avaí (R)	38	9	8	21	34	60	−26	35	Relegation to Campeonato Brasileiro Série B
20	Juventude (R)	38	3	13	22	29	69	−40	22	Relegation to Campeonato Brasileiro Série B

Source: CBF
Rules for classification: 1) points; 2) wins; 3) goal difference; 4) goals scored; 5) head-to-head results (only between two teams); 6) fewest red cards; 7) fewest yellow cards; 8) drawing of lots.
(C) Champions; (R) Relegated

=== Positions by round ===
The table lists the positions of teams after each week of matches.
In order to preserve chronological evolvements, any postponed matches are not included to the round at which they were originally scheduled, but added to the full round they were played immediately afterwards.

Team ╲ Round	1	2	3	4	5	6	7	8	9	10	11	12	13	14	15	16	17	18	19	20	21	22	23	24	25	26	27	28	29	30	31	32	33	34	35	36	37	38
América Mineiro	16	9	14	10	4	8	9	10	5	9	9	13	16	17	13	15	17	17	15	13	10	8	9	9	8	8	8	8	8	8	8	8	9	11	9	7	9	10
Athletico-PR	20	20	16	16	12	15	12	6	8	3	5	4	3	3	2	6	6	5	5	4	4	5	6	6	6	6	6	6	6	6	6	6	6	6	6	6	6	6
Atlético-GO	11	18	17	17	19	19	17	17	19	18	15	17	12	13	16	18	18	18	18	19	19	19	19	19	19	19	19	19	19	18	18	18	17	18	18	17	17	18
Atlético-MG	4	2	2	3	7	2	4	2	3	4	6	6	4	5	3	4	2	3	4	7	7	7	7	7	7	7	7	7	7	7	7	7	7	7	7	8	7	7
Avaí	6	14	6	9	3	7	10	13	14	16	10	7	11	11	11	16	12	13	16	16	16	17	17	18	18	18	17	18	18	19	19	19	19	19	19	19	19	19
Botafogo	17	10	12	13	8	4	5	7	10	15	17	14	7	10	9	10	11	12	11	12	12	12	14	14	13	12	10	9	10	9	9	10	11	10	11	10	8	11
Ceará	5	12	15	15	17	18	19	19	16	12	13	15	13	15	15	17	14	11	12	14	14	14	15	15	15	14	15	16	16	15	16	16	16	17	17	18	18	17
Corinthians	3	1	3	1	1	1	1	3	1	2	2	2	2	2	4	2	3	2	2	2	2	3	4	4	3	5	5	4	4	4	3	5	4	5	5	4	4	4
Coritiba	2	8	10	4	10	6	8	4	4	5	7	12	15	16	12	14	16	16	13	15	15	18	18	16	17	16	16	15	15	16	15	15	15	15	15	15	15	15
Cuiabá	7	11	4	7	11	14	16	16	18	17	18	18	18	18	18	13	15	15	17	17	18	16	16	17	16	17	18	17	17	17	17	17	18	16	16	16	16	16
Flamengo	10	4	9	12	14	16	14	8	11	14	16	10	14	9	8	9	7	7	6	5	5	2	3	2	2	3	4	5	5	5	4	3	3	3	3	5	5	5
Fluminense	13	6	13	14	15	12	7	11	13	8	8	11	6	6	6	5	5	4	3	3	3	4	2	3	5	4	3	2	3	3	5	4	5	4	4	3	3	3
Fortaleza	15	19	20	20	20	20	20	20	20	20	20	20	19	20	20	20	19	19	20	18	17	15	13	12	12	15	14	14	9	11	10	9	10	9	10	11	10	8
Goiás	19	17	18	18	16	13	15	15	12	13	14	16	17	14	17	12	13	14	14	11	13	13	11	10	9	9	9	11	12	13	14	14	14	13	14	13	13	13
Internacional	18	13	5	8	9	11	11	12	7	7	4	3	5	4	5	3	4	6	7	6	6	6	5	5	4	2	2	3	2	2	2	2	2	2	2	2	2	2
Juventude	8	16	19	19	18	17	18	18	17	19	19	19	20	19	19	19	20	20	19	20	20	20	20	20	20	20	20	20	20	20	20	20	20	20	20	20	20	20
Palmeiras	14	15	8	11	13	9	2	1	2	1	1	1	1	1	1	1	1	1	1	1	1	1	1	1	1	1	1	1	1	1	1	1	1	1	1	1	1	1
Red Bull Bragantino	9	3	7	2	5	10	13	14	15	11	12	9	10	12	14	11	8	8	8	8	8	9	10	11	11	11	12	13	14	12	13	13	13	14	13	14	14	14
Santos	12	5	1	6	2	5	6	9	9	10	11	8	8	7	10	8	10	9	9	9	9	10	8	8	10	10	11	10	11	14	11	11	12	12	12	12	12	12
São Paulo	1	7	11	5	6	3	3	5	6	6	3	5	9	8	7	7	9	10	10	10	11	11	12	13	14	13	13	12	13	10	12	12	8	8	8	9	11	9

Leader and Copa Libertadores group stage
Copa Libertadores group stage
Copa Libertadores second stage
Copa Sudamericana group stage
Relegation to Campeonato Brasileiro Série B

Source: CBF.com

== Results ==
Home \ Away	AMG	CAP	ACG	CAM	AVA	BOT	CEA	COR	CFC	CUI	FLA	FLU	FOR	GOI	INT	JUV	PAL	RBB	SAN	SPA
América Mineiro	—	1–0	1–1	1–1	3–1	1–1	0–2	1–0	2–0	2–1	1–2	0–0	1–2	1–0	1–0	4–1	0–1	0–3	1–0	1–2
Athletico Paranaense	1–1	—	4–1	0–1	2–1	3–0	1–0	1–1	1–0	2–2	1–0	1–0	1–1	3–2	0–0	2–0	1–3	4–2	2–2	1–0
Atlético Goianiense	0–1	1–1	—	0–2	2–1	1–1	1–0	0–1	2–0	1–1	1–1	3–2	0–1	0–1	1–2	3–1	1–1	2–1	2–3	1–2
Atlético Mineiro	1–2	2–3	2–0	—	2–1	0–2	0–0	1–2	2–2	3–0	2–0	2–0	3–2	0–1	2–0	1–0	0–1	1–1	1–1	0–0
Avaí	1–0	1–1	1–2	1–0	—	1–2	2–0	1–1	2–1	1–2	1–2	0–3	3–2	3–2	0–1	1–2	2–2	1–2	1–0	1–1
Botafogo	0–0	2–0	0–0	0–1	0–1	—	1–1	1–3	2–0	0–2	0–1	0–1	3–1	1–2	0–1	1–1	1–3	2–1	3–0	1–0
Ceará	1–2	0–0	1–1	0–0	1–0	1–3	—	3–1	1–1	1–1	2–2	0–1	0–1	1–1	1–1	4–1	1–2	0–1	2–1	0–2
Corinthians	1–1	2–1	2–1	0–1	3–0	1–0	1–0	—	3–1	2–0	1–0	0–2	1–0	1–0	2–2	2–0	0–1	1–0	0–0	1–1
Coritiba	1–0	0–1	2–0	0–1	1–0	1–0	1–0	2–2	—	1–0	1–0	3–2	2–1	3–0	1–1	2–2	0–2	2–1	1–2	1–1
Cuiabá	2–1	0–1	1–1	1–1	1–0	2–0	0–0	1–0	2–1	—	1–2	0–1	0–1	1–2	1–1	1–0	1–1	1–1	0–0	1–1
Flamengo	3–0	5–0	4–1	1–0	1–2	0–1	1–1	1–2	2–0	2–0	—	1–2	1–2	1–0	0–0	4–0	0–0	4–1	3–2	3–1
Fluminense	0–2	2–1	0–2	5–3	2–0	2–2	2–1	4–0	5–2	1–0	1–2	—	2–1	3–0	0–1	4–0	1–1	2–1	0–0	3–1
Fortaleza	1–0	0–0	1–1	0–0	2–0	1–3	0–1	1–0	3–1	0–1	3–2	0–1	—	1–1	3–0	1–1	0–0	6–0	0–0	1–1
Goiás	2–2	2–1	2–1	2–2	1–1	0–1	1–1	0–0	1–0	1–0	1–1	2–3	0–1	—	1–2	1–0	1–1	1–1	1–0	0–4
Internacional	1–0	2–0	1–1	3–0	0–0	2–3	2–1	2–2	3–0	1–0	3–1	3–0	2–1	4–2	—	4–0	3–0	0–0	1–0	3–3
Juventude	0–1	1–3	1–1	1–2	1–1	2–2	1–0	2–2	0–1	0–1	2–2	1–0	1–1	0–0	1–1	—	0–3	2–2	1–2	1–2
Palmeiras	2–1	0–2	4–2	0–0	3–0	4–0	2–3	3–0	4–0	1–0	1–1	1–1	4–0	3–0	2–1	2–1	—	2–0	1–0	0–0
Red Bull Bragantino	1–4	4–2	4–0	1–1	4–0	0–1	1–1	0–1	4–2	2–1	1–0	0–1	2–1	1–1	0–2	1–0	2–2	—	0–2	1–1
Santos	3–0	2–0	1–0	1–2	1–1	2–0	0–0	0–1	2–1	4–1	1–2	2–2	0–2	1–2	1–1	4–1	0–1	2–2	—	1–0
São Paulo	1–0	4–0	2–1	2–2	4–0	0–1	2–2	1–1	3–1	2–1	0–2	2–2	0–1	3–3	0–1	0–0	1–2	3–0	2–1	—

Source: CBF
Legend: Blue = home team win; Yellow = draw; Red = away team win.

== Season statistics ==
=== Top scorers ===
Rank	Player	Club	Goals
1	(Argentina) Germán Cano	Fluminense	26
2	(Brazil) Pedro Raul	Goiás	19
3	(Argentina) Jonathan Calleri	São Paulo	18
4	(Brazil) Guilherme Bissoli	Avaí	14
5	(Brazil) Marcos Leonardo	Santos	13
6	(Brazil) Hulk	Atlético Mineiro	12
6	(Brazil) Rony	Palmeiras	12
6	(Uruguay) David Terans	Athletico Paranaense	12
9	(Brazil) Gabriel Barbosa	Flamengo	11
9	(Brazil) Luan Cândido	Red Bull Bragantino	11
9	(Brazil) Luciano	São Paulo	11
9	(Brazil) Pedro	Flamengo	11

Source: Soccerway

=== Top assists ===
Rank	Player	Club	Assists
1	(Brazil) Gustavo Scarpa	Palmeiras	12
2	(Colombia) Jhon Arias	Fluminense	10
2	(Uruguay) Giorgian De Arrascaeta	Flamengo	10
4	(Brazil) Dudu	Palmeiras	8
5	(Brazil) Ângelo	Santos	7
6	(Brazil) Artur	Red Bull Bragantino	6
6	(Brazil) Ayrton Lucas	Flamengo	6
6	(Brazil) Dadá Belmonte	Goiás	6
6	(Uruguay) Carlos de Pena	Internacional	6
6	(Brazil) Juninho	América Mineiro	6
6	(Brazil) Welington	São Paulo	6

Source: Soccerway

=== Hat-tricks ===
Player	For	Against	Result	Date	Round	Ref.
(Argentina) Jonathan Calleri	São Paulo	Athletico Paranaense	4–0 (H)	10 April 2022	1st	
(Brazil) Róger Guedes	Corinthians	Avaí	3–0 (H)	16 April 2022	2nd	
(Brazil) Pedro	Flamengo	Red Bull Bragantino	4–1 (H)	1 October 2022	29th	
(Argentina) Germán Cano	Fluminense	São Paulo	3–1 (H)	5 November 2022	36th	

Notes

(H) – Home team
(A) – Away team

=== Clean sheets ===
Rank	Player	Club	Clean sheets
1	(Brazil) Weverton	Palmeiras	16
2	(Brazil) Everson	Atlético Mineiro	15
3	(Brazil) Cássio	Corinthians	14
3	(Brazil) Fábio	Fluminense	14
5	(Brazil) Fernando Miguel	Fortaleza	12
6	(Brazil) Bento	Athletico Paranaense	11
7	(Brazil) Daniel	Internacional	10
7	(Brazil) João Paulo	Santos	10
9	(Brazil) Matheus Cavichioli	América Mineiro	9
9	(Paraguay) Gatito Fernández	Botafogo	9

Source: FBref.com

== Awards ==
=== Monthly awards ===
Month	Player of the month		Ref.
Month	Player	Club	Ref.
April	(Argentina) Jonathan Calleri	São Paulo	
May	(Argentina) Jonathan Calleri	São Paulo	
June	(Brazil) Gustavo Scarpa	Palmeiras	
July	(Argentina) Germán Cano	Fluminense	
August	(Brazil) Fernando Miguel	Fortaleza	
September	(Argentina) Germán Cano	Fluminense	
October	(Brazil) Gustavo Scarpa	Palmeiras	

Month	Young Player of the month		Ref.
Month	Player	Club	Ref.
June	(Brazil) Erison	Botafogo	
July	(Brazil) Victor Hugo	Flamengo	
August	(Brazil) Lázaro	Flamengo	
September	(Brazil) Jeffinho	Botafogo	
October	(Brazil) Endrick	Palmeiras	
November	(Brazil) Matheus França	Flamengo	

=== Annual awards ===
Award	Winner	Club
Prêmio Craque do Brasileirão Best Coach	(Portugal) Abel Ferreira	Palmeiras
Bola de Prata Best Coach	(Portugal) Abel Ferreira	Palmeiras
Prêmio Craque do Brasileirão Best Newcomer	(Brazil) Endrick Felipe	Palmeiras
Prêmio Craque do Brasileirão Best Player	(Brazil) Gustavo Scarpa	Palmeiras
Bola de Ouro Best Player	(Brazil) Gustavo Scarpa	Palmeiras
Prêmio Craque do Brasileirão Goal of the Season	(Brazil) Endrick Felipe	Palmeiras

Série A Team of the Year
Goalkeeper	(Brazil) Weverton (Palmeiras)			
Defenders	(Brazil) Marcos Rocha (Palmeiras)	(Paraguay) Gustavo Gómez (Palmeiras)	(Brazil) Murilo Cerqueira (Palmeiras)	(Uruguay) Joaquín Piquerez (Palmeiras)
Midfielders	(Brazil) João Gomes (Flamengo)	(Brazil) André (Fluminense)	(Brazil) Gustavo Scarpa (Palmeiras)	(Uruguay) Giorgian de Arrascaeta (Flamengo)
Forwards	(Argentina) Germán Cano (Fluminense)		(Brazil) Pedro Raul (Goiás)	

== Attendances ==
#	Football club	Home games	Average attendance
1	Flamengo	19	54,487
2	Corinthians	19	39,088
3	Palmeiras	19	35,943
4	Fortaleza EC	19	32,961
5	Atlético Mineiro	19	31,537
6	Fluminense	19	30,593
7	São Paulo FC	19	30,132
8	Ceará SC	19	27,297
9	SC Internacional	19	22,902
10	Botafogo	19	20,861
11	Coritiba	19	20,749
12	Athletico Paranaense	19	19,229
13	Cuiabá EC	19	13,761
14	Santos FC	19	11,844
15	Goiás EC	19	10,511
16	Avaí FC	19	8,973
17	Atlético Goianiense	19	7,143
18	Red Bull Bragantino	19	4,769
19	América Futebol Clube	19	3,829
20	EC Juventude	19	3,823
