= Santos FC (youth) =

Association football club in Brazil

Santos
- Full name: Santos Futebol Clube
- Nickname: Meninos da Vila
- Founded: 7 August 2006
- Ground: CT Meninos da Vila
- Capacity: 5.000
- Head coach: U20: Élder Campos; U17: Marcos Bazílio; U16: Luciano Santos; U15: Fabrício Monte
- League: U20: Copa SP de Juniores; U20: Campeonato Paulista; U20: Campeonato Brasileiro
- 2025 2025 2025: U20: Copa SP de Juniores, 18th of 128; U20: Campeonato Paulista, 1st of 48 (champions); U20: Campeonato Brasileiro, 9th of 20
| Home colours | Away colours | Third colours |

The Santos Futebol Clube youth categories consist of the academy teams of Santos FC. The club has several categories, with the closer to the first team being the under-20 team, which play in the Campeonato Brasileiro Sub-20, the Campeonato Paulista Sub-20 and the Copa São Paulo de Futebol Júnior.

== Structure ==
Santos Futebol Clube is responsible for over 100 young athletes in five different categories: under-11s, under-13s, under-15s, under-17s and under-20s. On some occasions, an under-16 or an under-19 team is established mixing other categories, for specific competitions. The athletes stay in dormitories located inside Estádio Vila Belmiro, with living room, recreation room and cafeteria, and have medical, dental and psychological assistance.

The club developed the Centro de Desenvolvimento à Performance ao Futebol (Center of Football Performance Development) to set a pattern in physical preparation for all youth teams. This project starts with boys over six years old and covers 270 young athletes.

The gymnasium used by youth teams is located on the third floor at Vila Belmiro Stadium, and it is equipped with technology similar to that available for Santos' first team. Education is valued by the team, leading it to create the Centro de Estudos Luiza Neófiti (Luiza Neófiti Study Center) adjacent to the gym.

== Notable academy graduates ==
=== 2000s ===
From the squad who was crowned champions in 2002, Santos had 15 youth graduates (Rafael, Alex, André Luís, Michel, Pereira, Preto, Leandro, Canindé, Diego, Paulo Almeida, Adiel, Douglas, Robinho, William and Bruno Moraes) who appeared with the side over the year.

In 2003, with the club finishing second, another academy products appeared regularly with the first team. As Robinho, Alex, André Luís, Paulo Almeida and Diego were already starters, Jerri was the newcomer more regularly used during the year, mainly as a substitute.

In 2004 – another season of success – Domingos, Leonardo and Luís Augusto appeared regularly and were the main youth graduates of the year. After a vast majority of the players left the club and moved to Europe (the most notable sale was Robinho's to Real Madrid in 2005), the club struggled to produce any notable graduates in the following three years.

Santos' first team for the 2007 and 2008 seasons included players such as Renatinho, Felipe, Marcelo, Adriano, Carlinhos, Thiago Carleto, Díonísio and Moraes; the latter scored the winner in 2007 Campeonato Paulista.

=== 2010s ===
In the 2010 season's astronomic campaign, Santos had Neymar, Ganso, André, Alan Patrick, Rafael, Wesley and Robinho as their notable youth graduates (despite the latter two and André left in June). In the following two years, the club saw the emergence of Neymar as a rising star and also saw some youth graduates like Felipe Anderson and Victor Andrade stepping up and becoming first-team regulars for the side.

In 2013, a complete revolution took over the club after Neymar's transfer to FC Barcelona; former youth sides' head coach Claudinei Oliveira was promoted to first-team, and gave first-team football to Alan Santos, Leandrinho, Neílton, Giva, Emerson Palmieri, Gustavo Henrique and Alison, with the latter two impressing in the season. A year later, the club's youth emergence followed, with Geuvânio, Gabriel and Jubal also being in the spotlights.

In 2015, the club's youth graduates again appeared strongly in the main squad, with Daniel Guedes, Zeca and Thiago Maia becoming regulars, mainly under Dorival Júnior. In 2016, the first graduates from the B-team started to appear in the main squad, with Lucas Veríssimo, Ronaldo Mendes and Vitor Bueno being the players more regularly used. Although Ronaldo left in the summer, Bueno was elected the Newcomer of the year's Brasileirão after scoring ten goals.

Late in the 2017 season, prospects like Yuri Alberto and Rodrygo went straight to the main squad from the under-17s, with Rodrygo coming into prominence after becoming a regular starter for the club in the following year. Also in 2018, youth graduates like Robson Bambu, Gabriel Calabres, Guilherme Nunes and Matheus Guedes were all promoted from the under-20s, while Diego Pituca came from the B-team. Another youth team players like Victor Yan, Lucas Lourenço and Emerson featured on the bench for some matches, but were later demoted back to their youth sides. Late in the year, Kaio Jorge, a forward from the under-17s, was promoted to the first team.

On 16 October 2018, Santos' board opted to cease the activity of the B-team for the 2019 season. During the 2019 campaign, the youth setup had little protagonism in the first team's performance, with only Gustavo Henrique, Lucas Veríssimo and Alison featuring regularly; all of them, however, were already involved in the main squad in the past seasons. Wagner Leonardo, Sandry and Tailson were the only youth graduates to make their first team debuts in that season, but were peripheral figures in the squad.

=== 2020s ===
For the 2020 season under Jesualdo Ferreira, more youth graduates were involved in the first team routines, with Kaio Jorge establishing himself as a regular and Renyer making his first team debut. Jesualdo also promoted Ivonei, Anderson Ceará and Alex, while also taking Marcos Leonardo up for trainings.

After Jesualdo left and Cuca was appointed head coach, Ângelo made his debut as a 15-year-old, becoming the second-youngest player to debut in the club's history. Sandry became a regular starter, while João Paulo and John shared the starting spot on goal. The club also reached the 2020 Copa Libertadores Final, where five youth graduates took part of the club's starting eleven (John, Veríssimo, Alison, Sandry and Kaio Jorge) and another two came in as substitutes (Wellington Tim and Bruno Marques), while the club had 12 players who played for the youth categories among the 23-man matchday squad.

For the 2021 campaign, new head coach Ariel Holan gave the starting spot to Ângelo, Kaiky and Gabriel Pirani, with Kevin Malthus and Vinicius Balieiro being also regularly used. After Holan resigned, only Pirani featured regularly under subsequent head coaches Fernando Diniz and Fábio Carille.

During the 2022 season, Ângelo, Kaiky, Marcos Leonardo and Lucas Pires became regular starters at the club; Lucas Barbosa and Rwan Seco also started to feature in the main squad. In 2023, Deivid Washington became the most proeminent youth graduate, but was soon sold to Chelsea; Ângelo later followed suit.

In the 2024 campaign, Jair Cunha and JP Chermont established themselves in the first team, with Souza also becoming a backup option. In 2025, Luca Meirelles began the season as a first-team regular, with Miguel Terceros also receiving playing time.

In 2026, Gabriel Bontempo and Gustavo Henrique became starters under Cuca, with Bontempo receiving call-ups to the national team. In that year, nine players made their official first team debut with the club.

== Honours ==
=== National ===
- Copa do Brasil Sub-20
  - Winners (1): 2013
- Copa do Brasil Sub-15
  - Winners (1): 2011
- Copa Votorantim Sub-15
  - Winners (1): 2023

=== Inter-state ===
- Copa São Paulo de Futebol Júnior
  - Winners (3): 1984, 2013, 2014

=== State ===
- Campeonato Paulista Sub-20
  - Winners (6): 1979, 2007, 2008, 2012, 2022, 2025
- Campeonato Paulista Sub-17
  - Winners (6): 1994, 2001, 2004, 2010, 2014, 2024
- Campeonato Paulista Sub-15
  - Winners (1): 2009
- Campeonato Paulista Sub-13
  - Winners (6): 2006, 2008, 2009, 2010, 2014, 2015
- Campeonato Paulista Sub-11
  - Winners (4): 2011, 2012, 2013, 2019

=== Others ===
- Copa da Amizade Brasil-Japão
  - Winners (1): 2016

== Players ==
=== B team ===
Created in 2015 as Santos under-23 squad, the side acted mainly as a transition between the under-20 to the professional team. The B-team played in the Copa Paulista, before being disbanded in 2020.

In 2021, Santos again played in the Copa Paulista, but with the same team which played in the Campeonato Brasileiro de Aspirantes, mainly composed by under-20 players.

=== Other players under contract ===
Players above the age of 21 and unable to play for the under-20 team or lower.

As of 6 March 2026

Note: Flags indicate national team as defined under FIFA eligibility rules; some limited exceptions apply. Players may hold more than one non-FIFA nationality.

| No. | Pos. | Nation | Player |
|---|---|---|---|
| 67 | GK | BRA | Rodrigo Falcão |
| — | MF | CIV | Yeko Coulibaly |

| No. | Pos. | Nation | Player |
|---|---|---|---|
| — | FW | BRA | Enzo Boer |

=== Under-20 squad ===
As of 29 October 2026

Note: Flags indicate national team as defined under FIFA eligibility rules; some limited exceptions apply. Players may hold more than one non-FIFA nationality.

| No. | Pos. | Nation | Player |
|---|---|---|---|
| 88 | GK | BRA | Arthur do Vale |
| 79 | GK | BRA | João Pedro |
| — | GK | BRA | João Pedro Costa |
| — | GK | BRA | Pedro Traleski |
| — | DF | BRA | Diego Matos |
| — | DF | BRA | Guilherme Lemes |
| — | DF | BRA | Gustavo Assis |
| 42 | DF | BRA | João Alencar |
| 26 | DF | BRA | João Ananias |
| 99 | DF | BOL | Marcelo Torrez |
| — | DF | BRA | Pedro Murça |
| 66 | DF | BRA | Gabriel Follmer (on loan from Juventude) |
| — | DF | BRA | Guilherme Cruz |
| — | DF | BRA | Matheus Filipe |
| — | DF | BRA | Pedro Hian |
| — | DF | BRA | Pedro Saraiva |
| 38 | DF | BRA | Rafael Gonzaga |
| — | MF | BRA | Gabriel Paes |
| 80 | MF | BRA | Kauan Pierry |
| 37 | MF | BRA | Kenay |
| — | MF | BRA | Lucas Jaime |
| — | MF | BRA | Lucas Yan |
| — | MF | BRA | Luiz Eduardo (on loan from Corinthians) |

| No. | Pos. | Nation | Player |
|---|---|---|---|
| — | MF | BRA | Matheus Garcia |
| — | MF | BRA | Murillo Pará |
| 72 | MF | VEN | Nicola Profeta |
| 20 | MF | BRA | Pepê Fermino |
| 81 | MF | BRA | Samuel Pierri |
| 76 | MF | BRA | Vinicius Fabri |
| — | MF | BRA | Vitor Neves |
| — | FW | BRA | Benício |
| — | FW | BRA | Davi Santos |
| 59 | FW | BRA | David Nogueira |
| 27 | FW | BRA | Davizinho |
| 55 | FW | BRA | Fernando Pradella |
| — | FW | BRA | Iury |
| — | FW | BRA | João Grando |
| 41 | FW | BRA | João Victor Alves |
| 29 | FW | BRA | Kaio Ganga |
| 47 | FW | BRA | Mateus Xavier |
| 57 | FW | BRA | Nadson |
| 39 | FW | BRA | Pedro Assis |
| — | FW | BRA | Pedro Padula |
| — | FW | BRA | Rodrigo Cezar |
| — | FW | BRA | Ryan |

==== Current technical staff ====
| Position | Staff |
|---|---|
| Head coach | (Brazil) Élder Campos |
| Assistant coach | (Brazil) Matheus Vazquez |
| Goalkeeping coach | (Brazil) Mauro Mestriner |
| Fitness coach | (Brazil) Bruno Praglioli |
| Performance analyst | (Brazil) Matheus Alvarez |
| Doctor | (Brazil) Robson Tavares |
| Methodology coordinator | (Brazil) Douglas Bazolli |
| Youth general coordinator | (Brazil) Rodrigão |

Last updated: 25 March 2026
Source: Diário do Peixe

== Manager history ==
=== Under-20 squad ===
- (Brazil) Márcio Fernandes (2003–2008)
- (Brazil) Narciso (2008–2011)
- (Brazil) Claudinei Oliveira (2011–2013)
- (Brazil) Pepinho (2013–2015)
- (Brazil) Emerson Ballio (2015)
- (Brazil) Marcos Soares (2015–2017)
- (Brazil) Aarão Alves (2017–2018)
- (Brazil) Emerson Ballio (2019)
- (Brazil) Márcio Zanardi (2019)
- (Brazil) Pablo Fernandez (2020)
- (Brazil) Aarão Alves (2020–2021)
- (Brazil) Rodrigo Chipp (2021)
- (Brazil) Thiago Lima (caretaker; 2021)
- (Brazil) Élder Campos (2022)
- (Brazil) Orlando Ribeiro (2022–2024)
- (Brazil) Buião (caretaker; 2022)
- (Brazil) Leandro Zago (2024–2025)
- (Brazil) Fabrício Monte (caretaker; 2025)
- (Brazil) Maurício Copertino (2025)
- (Brazil) Vinicius Marques (2025–2026)
- (Brazil) Élder Campos (2026–)

== Academy graduates ==
Only players who made their senior debuts for Santos in the 21st century are listed;
Note: Academy graduates who still play for Santos, including those that are currently out on loan to other clubs, are highlighted in green. Players who have appeared for another senior team before making their first team debut with Santos are highlighted in italic.

=== 2000s ===
| Player | Pos. | Current Club | Born | Int. Honours | Debut | Head coach |
|---|---|---|---|---|---|---|
| Weldon | FW | Retired | (São Paulo (state)) Santo André | | Age 19 vs Flamengo, 29 January 2000 | Carlos Alberto Silva |
| André Luís | CB | Retired | (Rio Grande do Sul) Porto Alegre | Brazil U23 apps | Age 20 vs Araçatuba, 22 March 2000 | Carlos Alberto Silva |
| Paulo Almeida | DM | Retired | (Bahia) Itarantim | Full Brazil apps | Age 19 vs Guarani, 17 May 2000 | Giba |
| Canindé | AM | Retired | (Ceará) Canindé | | Age 19 vs Juventude, 31 May 2000 | Giba |
| Wellington | AM | Retired | (São Paulo (state)) Santos | | Age 19 vs Santa Cruz, 9 September 2000 | Giba |
| Elano | AM | Retired | (São Paulo (state)) Iracemápolis | Full Brazil apps | Age 19 vs Guarani, 21 January 2001 | Geninho |
| Pereira | CB | Retired | (São Paulo (state)) Guarulhos | | Age 20 vs Fluminense, 1 February 2001 | Geninho |
| Rafael Pinheiro | GK | Retired | (São Paulo (state)) São Paulo | | Age 19 vs Corinthians, 18 March 2001 | Geninho |
| Leandro da Luz | LB | Retired | (São Paulo (state)) Cândido Mota | | Age 18 vs São Caetano, 6 October 2001 | Cabralzinho |
| William | FW | Retired | (Paraná (state)) Rolândia | Brazil U23 apps | Age 18 vs Corinthians, 28 October 2001 | Cabralzinho |
| Diego | AM | Retired | (São Paulo (state)) Ribeirão Preto | Full Brazil apps | Age 16 vs America-RJ, 20 January 2002 | Celso Roth |
| Douglas | FW | Retired | (São Paulo (state)) Santo André | | Age 19 vs Ji-Paraná, 6 February 2002 | Celso Roth |
| Robinho | FW | Retired | (São Paulo (state)) São Vicente | Full Brazil apps | Age 18 vs Guarani, 24 March 2002 | Celso Roth |
| Bruno Moraes | FW | Retired | (São Paulo (state)) Santos | | Age 18 vs Flamengo, 26 October 2002 | Emerson Leão |
| Marcão | CB | Retired | (São Paulo (state)) Jacareí | | Age 21 vs São Paulo, 28 November 2002 | Emerson Leão |
| Jerri | AM | Retired | (Rio Grande do Sul) Osório | | Age 21 vs Bahia, 28 June 2003 | Emerson Leão |
| Jaílson | LB | Retired | (Rio Grande do Sul) Frederico Westphalen | | Age 19 vs Atlético Paranaense, 19 October 2003 | Emerson Leão |
| Silvio | CB | Retired | (São Paulo (state)) Araraquara | | Age 20 vs Fluminense, 23 November 2003 | Emerson Leão |
| Luís Augusto | DM | Retired | (Piauí) Oeiras | | Age 20 vs União São João, 15 February 2004 | Emerson Leão |
| Domingos | CB | Retired | (Bahia) Nazaré | | Age 18 vs Atlético Mineiro, 30 May 2004 | Vanderlei Luxemburgo |
| Leonardo | CB | Retired | (São Paulo (state)) Guarulhos | Brazil U20 apps | Age 18 vs Flamengo, 14 September 2004 | Vanderlei Luxemburgo |
| Luizinho | FW | Retired | (São Paulo (state)) São Paulo | | Age 19 vs Atlético Paranaense, 8 September 2004 | Vanderlei Luxemburgo |
| Giba | LB | Retired | (São Paulo (state)) São Paulo | | Age 19 vs Ponte Preta, 23 January 2005 | Oswaldo de Oliveira |
| Halisson | CB | Retired | (São Paulo (state)) Bauru | | Age 19 vs Corinthians, 13 February 2005 | Oswaldo de Oliveira |
| Rossini | FW | Retired | (São Paulo (state)) Santos | | Age 19 vs Corinthians, 13 February 2005 | Oswaldo de Oliveira |
| Beto | DM | Retired | (São Paulo (state)) São Vicente | | Age 21 vs América-SP, 20 March 2005 | Oswaldo de Oliveira |
| Cadu | AM | Retired | (São Paulo (state)) Igarapava | | Age 18 vs Inter de Limeira, 26 March 2005 | Alexandre Gallo |
| Rogério | CB | Retired | (Bahia) Camacan | | Age 20 vs São Paulo, 3 April 2005 | Alexandre Gallo |
| Edmílson | AM | Retired | (São Paulo (state)) Santos | Brazil U18 apps | Age 17 vs Marília, 17 April 2005 | Alexandre Gallo |
| Renatinho | FW | Retired | (São Paulo (state)) São Vicente | | Age 17 vs Marília, 17 April 2005 | Alexandre Gallo |
| Nadson | CB | Retired | (Bahia) Ubaitaba | | Age 20 vs Palmeiras, 29 May 2005 | Alexandre Gallo |
| Carlinhos | LB | Retired | (Bahia) Vitória da Conquista | Full Brazil apps | Age 18 vs Fortaleza, 19 June 2005 | Alexandre Gallo |
| Xuxa | AM | Retired | (São Paulo (state)) Lorena | | Age 19 vs Juventude, 3 July 2005 | Alexandre Gallo |
| Saulo | GK | Inter de Limeira | (São Paulo (state)) Salto | | Age 19 vs Cruzeiro, 24 July 2005 | Alexandre Gallo |
| Zé Leandro | RB | Retired | (São Paulo (state)) São Paulo | | Age 20 vs Coritiba, 28 August 2005 | Alexandre Gallo |
| Matheus Ferraz | CB | Retired | (São Paulo (state)) São José do Rio Pardo | | Age 20 vs Corinthians, 6 November 2005 | Nelsinho Baptista |
| Bruno Martins | DM | Retired | (São Paulo (state)) Santos | | Age 19 vs Internacional, 13 November 2005 | Nelsinho Baptista |
| Rivaldo | DM | Retired | (Pernambuco) Salgadinho | | Age 20 vs Paraná, 16 November 2005 | Nelsinho Baptista |
| Felipe Garcia | GK | Cianorte | (São Paulo (state)) São Vicente | Brazil U17 apps | Age 18 vs Cruzeiro, 6 September 2006 | Vanderlei Luxemburgo |
| Paulo | RB | Retired | (Rio de Janeiro (state)) Magé | | Age 19 vs Cruzeiro, 6 September 2006 | Vanderlei Luxemburgo |
| Adriano | DM | Retired | (São Paulo (state)) São Vicente | Brazil U17 apps | Age 19 vs Paraná, 11 November 2006 | Vanderlei Luxemburgo |
| Juninho | FW | Retired | (São Paulo (state)) São Paulo | | Age 19 vs Santa Cruz, 3 December 2006 | Vanderlei Luxemburgo |
| Marcelo | CB | Retired | (São Paulo (state)) São Vicente | Brazil U20 apps | Age 19 vs Marília, 25 February 2007 | Vanderlei Luxemburgo |
| Dionísio | DM | Retired | (São Paulo (state)) São Bernardo do Campo | | Age 19 vs Rio Branco, 3 March 2007 | Vanderlei Luxemburgo |
| Júnior Moraes | FW | Retired | (São Paulo (state)) Santos | Full Ukraine apps | Age 19 vs Ponte Preta, 1 April 2007 | Vanderlei Luxemburgo |
| Thiago Carleto | LB | Retired | (São Paulo (state)) São Bernardo do Campo | | Age 18 vs Juventus, 11 April 2007 | Vanderlei Luxemburgo |
| Hudson | DM | Retired | (Minas Gerais) Juiz de Fora | | Age 19 vs Sport, 13 May 2007 | Vanderlei Luxemburgo |
| Wesley | CM | Retired | (São Paulo (state)) Catanduva | Full Brazil apps | Age 20 vs São Paulo, 24 June 2007 | Vanderlei Luxemburgo |
| Filipi Sousa | RB | Retired | (São Paulo (state)) Santos | | Age 20 vs Portuguesa, 16 January 2008 | Emerson Leão |
| Anderson Salles | CB | Free agent | (São Paulo (state)) Araçariguama | | Age 19 vs Palmeiras, 20 January 2008 | Emerson Leão |
| Alex Willian | AM | Retired | (São Paulo (state)) Piquete | | Age 19 vs Bragantino, 27 January 2008 | Emerson Leão |
| Tiago Luís | FW | Retired | (São Paulo (state)) Ribeirão Preto | | Age 17 vs Bragantino, 27 January 2008 | Emerson Leão |
| Alemão | FW | Retired | (São Paulo (state)) Valinhos | | Age 18 vs Grêmio Barueri, 31 January 2008 | Emerson Leão |
| Ganso | AM | Fluminense | (Pará) Ananindeua | Full Brazil apps | Age 18 vs Rio Preto, 17 February 2008 | Emerson Leão |
| Patrik | AM | Retired | (São Paulo (state)) Franca | | Age 20 vs Goiás, 22 June 2008 | Cuca |
| Vinicius Simon | CB | Retired | (São Paulo (state)) Limeira | | Age 21 vs Coritiba, 3 August 2008 | Cuca |
| Neymar | FW | Santos | (São Paulo (state)) Mogi das Cruzes | Full Brazil apps | Age 17 vs Oeste, 7 March 2009 | Vagner Mancini |
| André | FW | Retired | (Rio de Janeiro (state)) Cabo Frio | Full Brazil apps | Age 19 vs Mogi Mirim, 15 March 2009 | Vagner Mancini |
| Alan Santos | DM | Betim | (Bahia) Salvador | | Age 18 vs Fluminense, 30 August 2009 | Vagner Mancini |
| Alan Patrick | AM | Internacional | (São Paulo (state)) Catanduva | Brazil U20 apps | Age 17 vs Santo André, 13 September 2009 | Vagner Mancini |

=== 2010s ===
| Player | Pos. | Current Club | Born | Int. Honours | Debut | Head coach |
|---|---|---|---|---|---|---|
| Breitner | AM | Retired | (Venezuela) Barcelona | Venezuela U20 apps | Age 20 vs Rio Branco-SP, 17 January 2010 | Dorival Júnior |
| Serginho | AM | Maringá | (São Paulo (state)) Santos | | Age 19 vs Ponte Preta, 20 January 2010 | Dorival Júnior |
| Wesley Santos | LB | Retired | (São Paulo (state)) São Vicente | | Age 19 vs Rio Claro, 14 February 2010 | Dorival Júnior |
| Rafael Cabral | GK | Real Salt Lake | (São Paulo (state)) Sorocaba | Full Brazil apps | Age 20 vs Cruzeiro, 2 June 2010 | Dorival Júnior |
| Dimba | FW | Retired | (Goiás) Rialma | | Age 18 vs Grêmio Prudente, 1 August 2010 | Dorival Júnior |
| Rafael Caldeira | CB | Retired | (São Paulo (state)) Monte Alto | | Age 19 vs Grêmio Prudente, 1 August 2010 | Dorival Júnior |
| Jefferson Souza | DM | Retired | (Rio de Janeiro (state)) Rio de Janeiro | | Age 21 vs Atlético Mineiro, 6 November 2010 | Dorival Júnior |
| Felipe Anderson | AM | Palmeiras | (Federal District (Brazil)) Santa Maria | Full Brazil apps | Age 17 vs Fluminense, 6 October 2010 | Marcelo Martelotte |
| Anderson Carvalho | DM | Free agent | (São Paulo (state)) Cubatão | | Age 20 vs São Paulo, 30 January 2011 | Adílson Batista |
| Vladimir | GK | Atlético Goianiense | (Bahia) Ipiaú | | Age 21 vs Ponte Preta, 2 February 2011 | Adílson Batista |
| Tiago Alves | FW | Free agent | (Pará) São João do Araguaia | | Age 18 vs Ponte Preta, 2 February 2011 | Adílson Batista |
| Crystian | RB | Sousa | (Goiás) Goiânia | Brazil U17 apps | Age 19 vs Santo André, 5 February 2011 | Adílson Batista |
| Walace | CB | Naviraiense | (São Paulo (state)) São Paulo | | Age 18 vs Cruzeiro, 11 June 2011 | Muricy Ramalho |
| Renan Mota | FW | Retired | (Pará) Marabá | | Age 19 vs Figueirense, 30 June 2011 | Muricy Ramalho |
| Alison | DM | Retired | (São Paulo (state)) Mongaguá | Brazil U20 apps | Age 18 vs Cruzeiro, 10 September 2011 | Muricy Ramalho |
| Emerson | LB | Marseille | (São Paulo (state)) Santos | Full Italy apps | Age 17 vs XV de Piracicaba, 21 January 2012 | Muricy Ramalho |
| Paulo Henrique | LB | Retired | (São Paulo (state)) São Paulo | | Age 19 vs Botafogo-SP, 2 February 2012 | Muricy Ramalho |
| Geuvânio | FW | Amazonas | (Sergipe) Ilha das Flores | | Age 20 vs Fluminense, 6 June 2012 | Muricy Ramalho |
| Victor Andrade | FW | Náutico | (Sergipe) Carmópolis | | Age 16 vs Fluminense, 6 June 2012 | Muricy Ramalho |
| Gustavo Henrique | CB | Corinthians | (São Paulo (state)) São Paulo | Brazil U23 apps | Age 19 vs Flamengo, 17 June 2012 | Muricy Ramalho |
| Douglas | RB | Retired | (Espírito Santo) Iúna | | Age 19 vs Portuguesa, 1 July 2012 | Muricy Ramalho |
| Leandrinho | CM | Emirates | (Minas Gerais) Espinosa | | Age 18 vs Náutico, 5 August 2012 | Muricy Ramalho |
| Pedro Castro | AM | CRB | (Rio de Janeiro (state)) Volta Redonda | | Age 19 vs Náutico, 5 August 2012 | Muricy Ramalho |
| Jubal | CB | Krasnodar | (Goiás) Inhumas | Brazil U20 apps | Age 19 vs Ituano, 30 January 2013 | Muricy Ramalho |
| Giva | FW | Free agent | (Bahia) Cachoeira | | Age 20 vs XV de Piracicaba, 24 February 2013 | Muricy Ramalho |
| Gabriel | FW | Santos | (São Paulo (state)) São Bernardo do Campo | Full Brazil apps | Age 16 vs Flamengo, 26 May 2013 | Muricy Ramalho |
| Neilton | FW | Free agent | (Minas Gerais) Nanuque | | Age 19 vs Botafogo, 29 May 2013 | Muricy Ramalho |
| Léo Cittadini | CM | Ningbo Professional | (São Paulo (state)) Rio Claro | | Age 18 vs Atlético Mineiro, 12 June 2013 | Claudinei Oliveira |
| Lucas Otávio | DM | Retired | (Paraná (state)) Cornélio Procópio | | Age 18 vs CRAC, 24 July 2013 | Claudinei Oliveira |
| Diego Cardoso | FW | A'Ali | (São Paulo (state)) Ribeirão Preto | | Age 19 vs Audax, 21 January 2014 | Oswaldo de Oliveira |
| Stéfano Yuri | FW | Retired | (Minas Gerais) Vazante | | Age 19 vs Corinthians, 29 January 2014 | Oswaldo de Oliveira |
| Serginho | AM | Beijing Guoan | (São Paulo (state)) Monte Aprazível | Full China apps | Age 18 vs Oeste, 9 March 2014 | Oswaldo de Oliveira |
| Nailson | CB | Free agent | (Paraná (state)) Arapongas | | Age 20 vs Mixto, 2 April 2014 | Oswaldo de Oliveira |
| Zeca | LB | Athletic-MG | (Paraná (state)) Paranavaí | Brazil Olympic apps | Age 19 vs Figueirense, 11 May 2014 | Oswaldo de Oliveira |
| Jorge Eduardo | FW | Tauras Tauragė | (São Paulo (state)) São Paulo | | Age 19 vs Flamengo, 25 May 2014 | Oswaldo de Oliveira |
| Paulo Ricardo | CB | Garudayaksa | (Santa Catarina (state)) Laguna | | Age 20 vs Palmeiras, 18 July 2014 | Oswaldo de Oliveira |
| Caju | LB | Buriram United | (Bahia) Irecê | Brazil U20 apps | Age 18 vs Figueirense, 21 September 2014 | Enderson Moreira |
| Thiago Maia | DM | Internacional | (Roraima) Boa Vista | Brazil Olympic apps | Age 17 vs Chapecoense, 25 October 2014 | Enderson Moreira |
| Daniel Guedes | RB | Juventus-SP | (São Paulo (state)) João Ramalho | | Age 20 vs Botafogo, 30 November 2014 | Enderson Moreira |
| Lucas Crispim | FW | Fortaleza | (Federal District (Brazil)) Brasília | | Age 20 vs Ituano, 6 January 2015 | Enderson Moreira |
| Fernando Medeiros | DM | Egnatia | (São Paulo (state)) Santos | | Age 19 vs Atlético Paranaense, 6 December 2015 | Dorival Júnior |
| Lucas Veríssimo | CB | Santos | (São Paulo (state)) Jundiaí | Full Brazil apps | Age 20 vs São Bernardo, 30 January 2016 | Dorival Júnior |
| Igor Vinícius | RB | Santos | (Mato Grosso) Sinop | | Age 19 vs Santos-AP, 21 April 2016 | Dorival Júnior |
| Diogo Vitor | FW | Retired | (Minas Gerais) Coqueiral | | Age 19 vs Botafogo, 5 June 2016 | Dorival Júnior |
| Arthur Gomes | FW | Dynamo Moscow | (Minas Gerais) Uberlândia | Brazil U17 apps | Age 18 vs Ponte Preta, 6 November 2016 | Dorival Júnior |
| Matheus Oliveira | AM | FC Anyang | (São Paulo (state)) São Paulo | | Age 19 vs Novorizontino, 29 March 2017 | Dorival Júnior |
| João Paulo | GK | Santos | (Mato Grosso do Sul) Dourados | | Age 22 vs Vasco da Gama, 16 July 2017 | Levir Culpi |
| Rodrygo | FW | Real Madrid | (São Paulo (state)) Osasco | Full Brazil apps | Age 16 vs Atlético Mineiro, 4 November 2017 | Elano |
| Yuri Alberto | FW | Corinthians | (São Paulo (state)) São José dos Campos | Full Brazil apps | Age 16 vs Bahia, 16 November 2017 | Elano |
| Emerson | LB | CSKA 1948 | (Rondônia) Cacoal | | Age 19 vs Avaí, 3 December 2017 | Elano |
| Robson Bambu | CB | Atlético San Luis | (São Paulo (state)) São Vicente | Brazil U20 apps | Age 20 vs Ituano, 28 January 2018 | Jair Ventura |
| Guilherme Nunes | DM | Confiança | (Rio Grande do Sul) Novo Hamburgo | Brazil U20 apps | Age 19 vs São Paulo, 18 February 2018 | Jair Ventura |
| Victor Yan | DM | Batel | (São Paulo (state)) São Paulo | Brazil U17 apps | Age 16 vs São Bento, 11 March 2018 | Jair Ventura |
| Gabriel Calabres | CM | Retired | (São Paulo (state)) Matão | | Age 20 vs São Bento, 11 March 2018 | Jair Ventura |
| Kaio Jorge | FW | Cruzeiro | (Pernambuco) Olinda | Full Brazil apps | Age 16 vs Atlético Paranaense, 30 September 2018 | Cuca |
| Anderson Ceará | AM | National Bank | (Ceará) Tianguá | | Age 19 vs Botafogo, 21 November 2018 | Cuca |
| Lucas Lourenço | AM | Gama | (São Paulo (state)) Santos | Brazil U17 apps | Age 17 vs Sport, 2 December 2018 | Cuca |
| Sandry | DM | Free agent | (Bahia) Itabuna | Brazil U17 apps | Age 16 vs Bragantino, 31 January 2019 | Jorge Sampaoli |
| Wagner Leonardo | CB | Grêmio | (São Paulo (state)) Praia Grande | | Age 19 vs América-RN, 7 March 2019 | Jorge Sampaoli |
| Tailson | FW | PT Prachuap | (São Paulo (state)) Santo André | | Age 20 vs Vasco da Gama, 5 October 2019 | Jorge Sampaoli |

=== 2020s ===
| Player | Pos. | Current Club | Born | Int. Honours | Debut | Head coach |
|---|---|---|---|---|---|---|
| Renyer | FW | Azuriz | (Rio de Janeiro (state)) Rio de Janeiro | Brazil U17 apps | Age 16 vs Inter de Limeira, 30 January 2020 | Jesualdo Ferreira |
| Ivonei | CM | Al Bataeh | (Mato Grosso) Rondonópolis | Brazil U17 apps | Age 18 vs Internacional, 13 August 2020 | Cuca |
| Alex | CB | Al-Okhdood | (São Paulo (state)) Ribeirão Preto | | Age 21 vs Athletico Paranaense, 16 August 2020 | Cuca |
| Marcos Leonardo | FW | Ajax | (Bahia) Itapetinga | Brazil U20 apps | Age 17 vs Sport, 20 August 2020 | Cuca |
| Derick | CB | Arda Kardzhali | (São Paulo (state)) Santos | Brazil U17 apps | Age 18 vs Atlético Mineiro, 9 September 2020 | Cuca |
| Ângelo | FW | Al Nassr | (Federal District (Brazil)) Brasília | Brazil U20 apps | Age 15 vs Fluminense, 25 October 2020 | Cuca |
| John | GK | Nottingham Forest | (São Paulo (state)) Diadema | | Age 24 vs Internacional, 14 November 2020 | Marcelo Fernandes (Note: Caretaker head coach as Cuca tested positive for COVID-19) |
| Vinicius Balieiro | DM | Chapecoense | (São Paulo (state)) Campinas | | Age 21 vs Internacional, 14 November 2020 | Marcelo Fernandes |
| Bruno Marques | FW | Retrô | (Pernambuco) Recife | | Age 21 vs Sport, 28 November 2020 | Cuca |
| Fernando Pileggi | RB | Retired | (São Paulo (state)) São Paulo | | Age 21 vs Vasco da Gama, 20 December 2020 | Cuca |
| Wellington Tim | CB | São Bernardo | (Rio de Janeiro (state)) Rio de Janeiro | | Age 19 vs Atlético Mineiro, 26 January 2021 | Cuca |
| Gabriel Pirani | AM | San Diego FC | (São Paulo (state)) Penápolis | Brazil U23 apps | Age 18 vs Bahia, 25 February 2021 | Marcelo Fernandes |
| Allanzinho | FW | Juventude | (São Paulo (state)) Bertioga | | Age 20 vs Bahia, 25 February 2021 | Marcelo Fernandes |
| Sandro Perpétuo | RB | Free agent | (Minas Gerais) Governador Valadares | Brazil U16 call-up | Age 19 vs Santo André, 28 February 2021 | Marcelo Fernandes |
| Kaiky | CB | Shabab Al Ahli | (São Paulo (state)) Santos | Brazil U20 apps | Age 17 vs Santo André, 28 February 2021 | Marcelo Fernandes |
| Kevin Malthus | CM | FC Cascavel | (Pará) Belém | | Age 18 vs Santo André, 28 February 2021 | Marcelo Fernandes |
| Robson Reis | CB | Hoang Anh Gia Lai | (Bahia) Vitória da Conquista | | Age 20 vs Santo André, 28 February 2021 | Marcelo Fernandes |
| Sabino | CB | São Paulo | (Federal District (Brazil)) Brasília | | Age 24 vs Ferroviária, 3 March 2021 | Ariel Holan |
| Jhonnathan | CB | Figueirense | (Paraná (state)) Foz do Iguaçu | | Age 20 vs Ferroviária, 3 March 2021 | Ariel Holan |
| Fernandinho | FW | Anápolis | (Minas Gerais) Uberaba | | Age 17 vs Ferroviária, 3 March 2021 | Ariel Holan |
| Lucas Barbosa | AM | Red Bull Bragantino | (São Paulo (state)) Bebedouro | | Age 20 vs Inter de Limeira, 18 April 2021 | Ariel Holan |
| Lucas Pires | LB | Burnley | (São Paulo (state)) São Paulo | | Age 20 vs Corinthians, 2 February 2022 | Fábio Carille |
| Rwan Seco | FW | Ludogorets Razgrad | (Pernambuco) Jaboatão dos Guararapes | | Age 20 vs São Paulo, 20 February 2022 | Marcelo Fernandes |
| Weslley Patati | FW | AZ Alkmaar | (Maranhão) Presidente Dutra | Brazil U18 call-up | Age 18 vs Corinthians, 13 July 2022 | Marcelo Fernandes |
| Ed Carlos | AM | Botafogo-PB | (São Paulo (state)) São Paulo | | Age 21 vs Internacional, 1 October 2022 | Orlando Ribeiro |
| Miguel Terceros | AM | Santos | (Bolivia) Santa Cruz de la Sierra | Full Bolivia apps | Age 18 vs Juventude, 10 October 2022 | Orlando Ribeiro |
| Deivid | FW | Strasbourg | (Goiás) Itumbiara | Brazil U20 apps | Age 17 vs Botafogo-SP, 11 April 2023 | Odair Hellmann |
| Cadu | RB | Osasco Sporting | (São Paulo (state)) Matão | Brazil U15 apps | Age 21 vs Blooming, 29 June 2023 | Paulo Turra |
| Kevyson | LB | Ponte Preta | (Minas Gerais) Leopoldina | | Age 19 vs Blooming, 29 June 2023 | Paulo Turra |
| Jair Cunha | CB | Nottingham Forest | (São Paulo (state)) Orlândia | Full Brazil apps | Age 18 vs Goiás, 9 November 2023 | Marcelo Fernandes |
| Souza | LB | Porto | (São Paulo (state)) Mauá | Brazil U20 call-up | Age 17 vs Mirassol, 11 February 2024 | Fábio Carille |
| JP Chermont | RB | Sharjah | (São Paulo (state)) Bauru | Brazil U20 apps | Age 17 vs Inter de Limeira, 9 March 2024 | Fábio Carille |
| Enzo Monteiro | FW | Chungbuk Cheongju | (Bolivia) Santa Cruz de la Sierra | Full Bolivia apps | Age 19 vs Paysandu, 20 April 2024 | Fábio Carille |
| Mateus Xavier | FW | Santos | (Bahia) Ibicaraí | | Age 17 vs Chapecoense, 2 July 2024 | Fábio Carille |
| Hyan | CM | Avaí | (Federal District (Brazil)) Brasília | | Age 20 vs Ceará, 5 July 2024 | Fábio Carille |
| Alejandro Villarreal | FW | Caracas | (Colombia) Medellín | Colombia U20 apps | Age 19 vs Avaí, 17 August 2024 | Fábio Carille |
| Diógenes | GK | Santos | (São Paulo (state)) Itapecerica da Serra | | Age 23 vs Ituano, 28 October 2024 | Fábio Carille |
| Luca Meirelles | FW | Shakhtar Donetsk | (Goiás) Goiânia | Brazil U20 apps | Age 17 vs CRB, 18 November 2024 | Fábio Carille |
| Gabriel Bontempo | AM | Santos | (Minas Gerais) Uberaba | Full Brazil apps | Age 20 vs Velo Clube, 25 January 2025 | Pedro Caixinha |
| Vinicius Lira | LB | Santos | (São Paulo (state)) São Paulo | Brazil U17 apps | Age 17 vs São Bernardo, 29 January 2025 | Pedro Caixinha |
| Robinho Júnior | FW | Genoa | (São Paulo (state)) Santos | Brazil U20 call-up | Age 17 vs Flamengo, 16 July 2025 | Cleber Xavier |
| Gustavo Henrique | DM | Santos | (São Paulo (state)) Limeira | | Age 20 vs Novorizontino, 10 January 2026 | Juan Pablo Vojvoda |
| Fernando Pradella | FW | Santos | (São Paulo (state)) Osasco | Brazil U15 apps | Age 17 vs Chapecoense, 28 January 2026 | Juan Pablo Vojvoda |
| Nadson | FW | Santos | (Bahia) Luís Eduardo Magalhães | Brazil U17 call-up | Age 17 vs Noroeste, 8 February 2026 | Juan Pablo Vojvoda |
| Rafael Gonzaga | LB | Santos | (São Paulo (state)) São Sebastião | Brazil U20 apps | Age 18 vs Deportivo Cuenca, 8 April 2026 | Cuca |
| João Ananias | CB | Santos | (São Paulo (state)) São Paulo | Brazil U20 apps | Age 19 vs Bahia, 25 April 2026 | Cuca |
| Samuel Pierri | DM | Santos | (São Paulo (state)) São Bento do Sapucaí | | Age 18 vs San Lorenzo, 20 May 2026 | Cuca |
| Davi Fernandes | FW | Santos | (Rio de Janeiro (state)) Rio de Janeiro | | Age 17 vs Grêmio, 23 May 2026 | Cuca |
| Pedro Assis | FW | Santos | (Bahia) Lauro de Freitas | | Age 19 vs Macará, 20 August 2026 | Cuca |
| João Alencar | CB | Santos | (Minas Gerais) Belo Horizonte | Brazil U17 call-up | Age 19 vs Fluminense, 18 October 2026 | Cuca |

== See also ==
- Santos FC
