= Rodrigo Chipp =

Brazilian football manager

Personal information
- Full name: Rodrigo Vicenzi Casarin
- Date of birth: 23 December 1986 (age 39)
- Place of birth: Nova Erechim, Brazil

Team information
- Current team: Chapecoense (assistant)

Managerial career
- Years: Team
- 2012–2014: Chapecoense (youth)
- 2015–2016: Desportivo Brasil (assistant)
- 2017: Chapecoense U17
- 2017: Chapecoense U20
- 2018–2019: Figueirense U17
- 2019: Figueirense U20
- 2019: Figueirense U23
- 2020: Santos U17
- 2020–2021: Santos U23 (assistant)
- 2021: Santos U20
- 2025–2026: Maringá
- 2026–: Chapecoense (assistant)
- 2026: Chapecoense (interim)

Rodrigo Vicenzi Casarin (born 23 December 1986), known as Rodrigo Chipp or just Chipp, is a Brazilian football coach, currently the assistant coach of Chapecoense.

== Career ==
Born in Nova Erechim, Santa Catarina, Chipp began his career with the youth sides of Chapecoense in 2012, before moving to Desportivo Brasil in 2015. He returned to Chape in 2017, working as the head coach of the under-17 and under-20 categories.

In 2018, Chipp signed for Figueirense as an under-17 coach, and was promoted to the under-20s in March of the following year. He also coached an under-23 side in the 2019 Copa Santa Catarina.

In February 2020, Chipp was appointed head coach of Santos' under-17 team. He was named an assistant of Edinho in the under-23 side in October, before replacing Aarão Alves as head coach of the under-20 team on 2 July 2021. On 24 September, however, he resigned.

On 24 November 2021, Chipp joined Athletico Paranaense as a technical coordinator. On 9 April 2024, he was announced at Botafogo as a methodology and technical manager of the youth categories.

On 4 August 2025, Chipp returned to coaching duties after being named head coach of Série C side Maringá. The following 11 February, he left the club by mutual consent.

On 24 June 2026, Chipp returned to Chape as a permanent assistant coach. On 9 November, he was named interim head coach of the club after Rafael Lacerda left, and coached the club in one Série A match before returning to his previous role.
