= Buião =

Buião may refer to:

- Buião (footballer, born 1946) (João Bosco dos Santos, born 1946), Brazilian footballer
- Buião (footballer, born 1968) (Antônio Carlos da Silva, born 1968), Brazilian football player and coach
