= Lucas Zanella =

Brazilian football coach

Personal information
- Full name: Lucas Palavro Zanella
- Date of birth: 6 February 1990 (age 36)
- Place of birth: Caxias do Sul, Brazil

Managerial career
- Years: Team
- 2010–2014: Juventude U14
- 2014–2016: Juventude U20 (assistant)
- 2017: Panambi
- 2017–2018: Grêmio U14
- 2019: Grêmio U15
- 2019–2020: Juventude U20
- 2021: Juventude (assistant)
- 2022: Juventude U20
- 2022: Juventude (assistant)
- 2022: Juventude (interim)
- 2023: Vila Nova (assistant)
- 2024: Chapecoense (assistant)
- 2024: Guarani (assistant)

Lucas Palavro Zanella (born 6 February 1990) is a Brazilian professional football coach.

== Career ==
Born in Caxias do Sul, Rio Grande do Sul, Zanella joined Juventude's youth categories in 2010, remaining four years before becoming an assistant of the B-team and coach of the under-20 side. In 2017, he was named in charge of Panambi, but left in March of that year to take over the under-14 team of Grêmio.

Zanella returned to Ju on 20 February 2019, after being named under-20 coach. He then worked as an assistant of the main squad before returning to the previous role for the 2022 Copa São Paulo de Futebol Júnior.

On 3 October 2022, Zanella was named interim head coach of the main squad, after Umberto Louzer was sacked. He was in charge of the club until the final rounds of the 2022 Série A, before returning to his previous role after Celso Roth was appointed manager.

On 2 December 2022, Zanella was fired by Ju.
