= Eduardo Oliveira =

Eduardo Oliveira may refer to:

- Eduardo Oliveira (footballer, born 1972), full name Eduardo Oliveira dos Santos, Brazilian football manager and former player
- Eduardo Oliveira (footballer, born 1982), full name Eduardo Gonçalves Torres de Oliveira, Brazilian football manager and former player
