= Buião (footballer, born 1968) =

Brazilian footballer (born 1968)

Personal information
- Full name: Antônio Carlos da Silva
- Date of birth: 15 February 1968 (age 58)
- Place of birth: Marília, Brazil
- Position: Forward

Youth career
- 1983–1987: Marília

Senior career*
Years	Team	Apps	(Gls)
1987–1988	Marília		
1989–1990	Palmeiras	36	(3)
1990–1991	Náutico	18	(1)
1991	Guarani	1	(0)
1992	Taquaritinga		
1993–1995	Comercial-SP		
1996	Sãocarlense		
1998	União Barbarense	16	(2)
1998	Shanghai Pudong		
1999–2000	Deportes Tolima		
2001	Atlético Huila		
2002	Sãocarlense		

Managerial career
- 2004: Ponte Preta (assistant)
- 2006: Sumaré
- 2008: São Judas Tadeu
- 2008: Comercial de Registro U20
- 2009: Grêmio Jaciara
- 2010: Rio Claro U20
- 2011: Grêmio Jaciara
- 2011: São Judas Tadeu
- 2012–2013: Rio Claro U20
- 2014: VOCEM
- 2015: Rio Claro
- 2017: Paracatu
- 2017: Carajás
- 2018: Paranavaí
- 2018: Brasilis
- 2019: Paracatu
- 2020: Real Brasília
- 2022–2024: Santos U20 (assistant)
- 2022: Santos U20 (interim)
- 2025: Paracatu
- * Club domestic league appearances and goals

Antônio Carlos da Silva (born 15 February 1968), commonly known as Buião, is a Brazilian football coach and former player who played as a forward.

== Playing career ==
Born in Marília, São Paulo, Buião was a youth graduate of hometown side Marília. For the 1990 season, he joined Palmeiras, where he featured sparingly.

After leaving Palmeiras in May 1990, Buião moved to fellow Série A side Náutico, and signed for Guarani in the following February. After featuring in only one match, he subsequently represented Taquaritinga, Comercial-SP, Sãocarlense and União Barbarense, winning the 1998 Campeonato Paulista Série A2 with the latter.

In 1998, Buião moved abroad for the first time in his career and joined Chinese side Shanghai Pudong. He moved to Colombia in the following year, and played for Deportes Tolima and Atlético Huila before returning to his home country with Sãocarlense in 2002; he retired shortly after, aged 34.

== Coaching career ==
After retiring, Buião worked as an assistant of Marco Aurélio at Ponte Preta in 2004. His first coaching experience came in 2006, as he was in charge of Sumaré.

In 2008, Buião was the head coach of São Judas Tadeu and the under-20 side of Comercial de Registro. He was named at the helm of Grêmio Jaciara in 2009, before returning to his native state in the following year with the under-20 team of Rio Claro.

Buião returned to Jaciara for the 2011 campaign, before again returning to São Judas Tadeu. He was again the head coach of Rio Claro's under-20 team in 2012 and 2013, before taking over VOCEM for the 2014 season; on 4 May of that year, he was sacked by the latter.

On 25 September 2014, Buião was announced as head coach of Rio Claro for the 2015 Campeonato Paulista. He was dismissed on 11 March 2015, and spent more than a year without coaching before taking over Paracatu for the 2017 campaign.

Sacked on 3 April 2017, Buião was appointed head coach of Carajás on 7 October. On 17 December, he took over Paranavaí, and also worked at Brasilis later in 2018.

Buião returned to Paracatu on 12 March 2019, and was named in charge of Real Brasília the following 21 January. He was sacked by the latter on 23 July 2020, and moved to the under-20 squad of Santos in February 2022, as Orlando Ribeiro's assistant.

In September 2022, as Ribeiro was named interim head coach of the main squad, Buião took over the under-20s. He left in September 2024 as Ribeiro was dismissed, he returned to head coaching duties in June 2025, after being named at the helm of Paracatu. He only lasted two matches at the side before being sacked on 16 September.

== Honours ==
=== Player ===
União Barbarense

- Campeonato Paulista Série A2: 1998
