= Paulo Almeida =

Brazilian footballer (born 1981)

Personal information
- Full name: Paulo Almeida Santos
- Date of birth: 20 April 1981 (age 45)
- Place of birth: Itarantim, Brazil
- Height: 1.76 m (5 ft 9 in)
- Position: Defensive midfielder

Youth career
- 1997: Cruzeiro
- 1998–2000: Santos

Senior career*
Years	Team	Apps	(Gls)
2000–2004	Santos	114	(0)
2004–2006	Benfica	6	(0)
2005–2006	Benfica B	27	(1)
2006–2007	Corinthians	13	(0)
2008	Náutico	5	(0)
2010	União Rondonópolis	16	(0)
2010–2011	Saba Qom	14	(0)
2011	Goianésia	0	(0)
2011	Rio Branco-AC	4	(0)
2012	Itumbiara	5	(2)
2012	Mixto	9	(0)
2014	Goianésia	3	(0)
2014	Mixto	4	(0)
2015	Vitória da Conquista	3	(1)

International career
2003	Brazil	5	(0)
- * Club domestic league appearances and goals

Paulo Almeida Santos (born 20 April 1981), known as Paulo Almeida, is a Brazilian retired footballer who played as a defensive midfielder.

A defensive midfielder known for his leadership, he was the captain of the Santos team, dubbed Meninos da Vila, that won the 2002 Brasileirão, their first since 1968. After representing Santos in their first Copa Libertadores Finals in forty years, Almeida had an unsuccessful spell at Benfica between 2004 and 2006. Afterwards, he represented a dozen others teams in Brazil.

He was called up to represent Brazil U23 at the 2003 CONCACAF Gold Cup, amassing five caps as Brazil finished runners-up.

== Club career ==
Born in Itarantim, Bahia, Almeida career started in the regional futsal leagues, eventually leading to a seven-month spell at Cruzeiro in 1997. After being released by Cruzeiro, he returned to futsal and had an impressive performance in a regional tournament. Luciano Lacerda saw him and brought him to Santos. In 2000, the 19-year old made his professional debut in a match against Guarani, and went on establish himself in the first team, replacing Freddy Rincón in the starting eleven. He was described by Pelé as having the same spirit as Zito: "It's always war for him, it's a guy that does not miss a training session because he always wants to be the best. It is funny, how they are coinciding at Santos. He was proven to be a player with future, with lots of personality".

At age 20, he was named captain and in the following year, Almeida and others like Diego, Robinho, Renato and Elano, known as Meninos da Vila, helped Santos win their first Brasileirão since 1968. He remained a team regular in 2003, helping Santos reach their first Copa Libertadores Finals since 1963, losing it to Boca Juniors. In January 2004, Santos tried to renew his contract but Almeida refused. Three months later it was announced that he would move to Benfica on a free transfer when his contract expired. Although he still competed in the early stages of the Brasileirão, in early June, Vanderlei Luxemburgo officially released him.

He made his debut for Benfica in a UEFA Champions League qualifying match with Anderlecht. Despite his recognition in Brazil, Almeida struggled to adjust to the tempo of European football, and by November it was speculated that he would be loaned out. He was offered back to Santos in an unsuccessful bid from Benfica to Robinho, and as the season progressed, he slipped down the pecking order and was demoted to the reserve team. After not finding a team in the summer of 2005, Almeida remained with the B-team and competed in the third tier, until he opted to terminate his contract with Benfica in April 2006.

Almeida returned to Brazil and in June, he signed with Corinthians, reuniting with Émerson Leão. He debuted on 5 August against Clube Atlético Paranaense, and represented the team until July 2007, when he rescinded his contract. His next club was Náutico which he played for between December 2007 and August 2008.

Almeida then changed clubs almost every six months, passing through União Esporte Clube, Goianésia, Rio Branco, Itumbiara, among others.

== International career ==
Almeida represented his national team five times, all of them in the 2003 CONCACAF Gold Cup, where Brazil sent their under-23 team, because their main team was competing in the 2003 FIFA Confederations Cup. Nevertheless, all the appearances and goals in this tournament were recognized by FIFA as full international caps. Almeida played with teammates, Robinho and Diego, plus others like Kaká and Nilmar, with Brazil reaching the final, where they lost one-nil with Mexico.

== Honours ==
Santos

- Copa Libertadores: runner-up 2003
- Brasileirão: 2002, 2004

Benfica

- Primeira Liga: 2004–05
- Supertaça Cândido de Oliveira: runner-up 2004

União Rondonópolis

- Campeonato Mato-Grossense: 2010

Rio Branco-AC

- Campeonato Acreano: 2011

Brazil

- CONCACAF Gold Cup: runner-up 2003
