= Renan (footballer, born April 1990) =

Brazilian footballer

Personal information
- Full name: Marcos Renan Oliveira Santana
- Date of birth: 7 April 1990 (age 36)
- Place of birth: Itarantim, Brazil
- Height: 1.67 m (5 ft 6 in)
- Position: Midfielder

Team information
- Current team: Fukushima United FC
- Number: 20

Youth career
- Grêmio Prudente

Senior career*
Years	Team	Apps	(Gls)
2010–2011	Grêmio Prudente	5	(0)
2012	Barueri		(0)
2013–2016	Roma Esporte Apucarana		
2014	→ Consadole Sapporo (loan)	5	(1)
2017	Fukushima United FC		
- * Club domestic league appearances and goals as of 23 February 2017

Marcos Renan Oliveira Santana (born 7 April 1990), also called Renan (ヘナン), is a Brazilian professional footballer who plays as a midfielder for Fukushima United FC.

== Career statistics ==
Updated to 23 February 2017.

Club performance			League		Cup		Total	
Season	Club	League	Apps	Goals	Apps	Goals	Apps	Goals
Japan			League		Emperor's Cup		Total	
2014	Consadole Sapporo	J2 League	5	1	0	0	5	1
2017	Fukushima United FC	J3 League	0	0	0	0	0	0
Total			5	1	0	0	5	1
