= Desportivo Brasil =

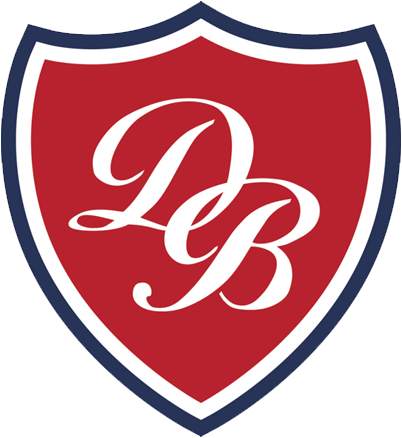
- Full name: Desportivo Brasil Participações Ltda.
- Nickname: DB
- Founded: November 19, 2005; 20 years ago
- Ground: Estádio Ernesto Rocco
- Capacity: 4,246
- Owner: Shandong Luneng Group
- President: Jianbo Hu
- Head Coach: Élio Sizenando
- League: Campeonato Paulista Série A3
- 2025: Paulista Série A3, 5th of 16
- Website: www.desportivobrasil.com.br
Home colours	Away colours

Desportivo Brasil Participações Ltda., commonly referred to as Desportivo Brasil, is a Brazilian professional association football club based in Porto Feliz, São Paulo. The team competes in the Campeonato Paulista Série A3, the third tier of the São Paulo state football league.

== History ==
Traffic Group founded Desportivo Brasil on November 19, 2005, and has managed the club since then. English club Manchester United announced a link-up with Desportivo Brasil on November 27, 2008, with a view to exchanging players to play in games and experience a different style of coaching.

== Stadium ==
Desportivo Brasil since 2010 play their home games at Estádio Municipal Alfredo Chiavegato, located in Jaguariúna. The stadium has a maximum capacity of 15,000 people. The club previously played their home games at Estádio Municipal Vila Porto, which has a maximum capacity of 5,000 people.
