= Luciano Santos =

Brazilian football coach (born 1987)

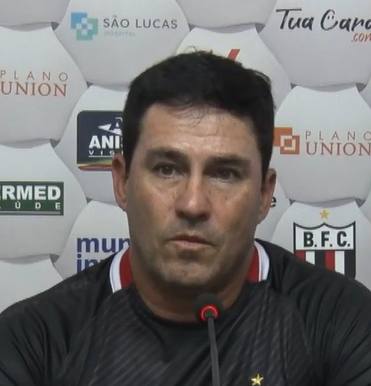
- Santos in 2022

Personal information
- Full name: Luciano Aparecido dos Santos da Costa
- Date of birth: 21 March 1979 (age 47)
- Place of birth: Praia Grande, Brazil

Team information
- Current team: Santos U16 (head coach)

Managerial career
- Years: Team
- 2011–2013: Santos U11
- 2014–2015: Santos U13
- 2016: Santos U15
- 2017–2018: Santos U17
- 2019: Santos U20 (assistant)
- 2019–2020: Emirates U19
- 2021: Portuguesa Santista U15
- 2022: Botafogo-SP U20
- 2023: Ferroviária (assistant)
- 2025: EC São Bernardo U20
- 2026: Santos U17
- 2026–: Santos U16

Luciano Aparecido dos Santos da Costa (born 21 March 1979) is a Brazilian football coach, currently the head coach of Santos' under-16 team.

== Career ==
Luciano Santos began his career with Santos FC in 2011, being in charge of the under-11 squad. He was later in charge of the under-13s, under-15s and under-17s, where he gained notoriety inside the club, being directly responsible for the developments of prospects like Rodrygo and Yuri Alberto.

In October 2018, Santos was promoted to the under-20 squad for the upcoming season, being initially an assistant to Leandro Mehlich. Despite Mehlich was sacked shortly after, he remained an assistant to Emerson Ballio, but was himself fired on 15 February 2019.

In late 2019, Santos moved abroad for the first time in his career and joined Emirates, working with their under-19 team. Back to his home country in January 2021, he was appointed head coach of Portuguesa Santista's under-15 squad, after the club established a partnership with a company to run their youth categories.

On 7 March 2022, Santos was announced as the head coach of the under-20 side of Botafogo-SP. In January 2023, he joined Elano's staff at Ferroviária, but left the club in June after Elano was sacked.

On 24 April 2025, after more than a year without a club, Santos took over EC São Bernardo's under-20 team. He left the club in the end of the season, and returned to Santos on 3 March 2026; initially in charge of the under-16s, he was promoted to the under-17 squad late in that month.
