= Enzo Boer =

Brazilian footballer

Personal information
- Full name: Enzo Duscov Boer
- Date of birth: 6 January 2005 (age 21)
- Place of birth: São Paulo, Brazil
- Height: 1.70 m (5 ft 7 in)
- Positions: Attacking midfielder; winger

Team information
- Current team: Santos

Youth career
- 2014–2015: São Caetano
- 2016–2024: São Paulo
- 2024–2026: Santos

Senior career*
Years	Team	Apps	(Gls)
2026–	Santos	0	(0)
2026	→ Santo André (loan)	2	(0)
- * Club domestic league appearances and goals as of 19:52, 18 February 2026 (UTC)

Enzo Duscov Boer (born 6 January 2005), known as Enzo Boer, is a Brazilian footballer who plays as either an attacking midfielder or a winger for Santos.

== Career ==
Born in São Paulo, Boer joined São Paulo FC's youth setup in 2016, after starting it out at São Caetano. On 28 August 2021, he signed his first professional contract with the club, after agreeing to a three-year deal.

On 3 September 2024, after failing to agree new terms, Boer left São Paulo and signed for Santos, being assigned to the under-20 team. He was regularly used for the latter in the 2025 season, winning the Campeonato Paulista Sub-20.

On 23 January 2026, Boer renewed his link with Peixe until the end of the year, and was loaned to Santo André on 6 February. He made his senior debut the following day, coming on as a second-half substitute in a 1–0 Campeonato Paulista Série A2 away loss to Ituano.

Boer played only one further match for Santo André before being recalled by his parent club shortly after, amidst an offer from Hungarian side Zalaegerszeg which was not accepted. He then trained in separate hours from the first team, but still renewed his contract until July 2028 and was loaned to Série B side Ponte Preta on 7 July 2026; nearly one month later, however, the deal fell through.

== Career statistics ==
As of 18 February 2026.

Club	Season	League			State League		Cup		Continental		Other		Total	
Club	Season	Division	Apps	Goals	Apps	Goals	Apps	Goals	Apps	Goals	Apps	Goals	Apps	Goals
Santo André	2026	Paulista A2	—		2	0	—		—		—		2	0
Career total			0	0	2	0	0	0	0	0	0	0	2	0

== Honours ==
Santos U20

- Campeonato Paulista Sub-20: 2025
