= Jaguariúna Futebol Clube =

Jaguariúna
- Full name: Jaguariúna Futebol Clube
- Founded: March 29, 2007
- Ground: Estádio Municipal Alfredo Chiavegato, Jaguariúna, São Paulo state, Brazil
- Capacity: 15,000
Home colours	Away colours

Jaguariúna Futebol Clube, commonly known as Jaguariúna (former EC São Judas Tadeu), is a Brazilian men's and women's football club based in Jaguariúna, São Paulo state.

== History ==
The club is the result of the merger of EC São Judas Tadeu with AD Jaguariúna, which took place in 2017. It is considered by the São Paulo football federation as the direct successor of São Judas Tadeu.

=== Men's team ===
The men's team competed in the Campeonato Paulista Segunda Divisão in 2011, 2017, 2018, 2019 and 2020. The club is currently licensed from professional competitions, operating only in the youth sectors.

=== Women's team ===
The women's team competed in the Campeonato Paulista Feminino in 2010.

== Stadium ==
Jaguaríuna FC play their home games at Estádio Municipal Alfredo Chiavegato. The stadium has a maximum capacity of 15,000 people.
