= Saulo (footballer, born 1985) =

Brazilian footballer

Personal information
- Full name: Saulo Squarsone Rodrigues dos Santos
- Date of birth: 10 August 1985 (age 41)
- Place of birth: Salto, Brazil
- Height: 1.91 m (6 ft 3 in)
- Position: Goalkeeper

Team information
- Current team: Inter de Limeira
- Number: 1

Youth career
- Criciúma
- 2005: Santos

Senior career*
Years	Team	Apps	(Gls)
2005–2006	Santos	24	(0)
2007	ADAP Galo Maringá		
2007–2009	Udinese	0	(0)
2008–2009	→ AlbinoLeffe (loan)	2	(0)
2010	Ituano	9	(0)
2010–2013	Guaratinguetá	98	(0)
2012	→ Bonsucesso (loan)	14	(0)
2014	Santo André	19	(0)
2014–2015	São Caetano	44	(0)
2016–2017	Red Bull Brasil	36	(0)
2017	Figueirense	25	(0)
2018–2019	Botafogo-PB	57	(0)
2020–2022	Ferroviária	74	(0)
2022	Chapecoense	20	(0)
2023–2024	Ferroviária	75	(0)
2025	Botafogo-PB	6	(0)
2025–	Inter de Limeira	27	(0)
- * Club domestic league appearances and goals as of 9 November 2026

Saulo Squarsone Rodrigues dos Santos (born 10 August 1985), simply known as Saulo, is a Brazilian professional footballer who plays as a goalkeeper for Inter de Limeira.

== Career ==
He formerly played in Brazil for Criciúma, Santos and ADAP. In November 2006, he sue Santos to release from the contract.

On 31 August 2007, he was signed by Udinese. On 22 July 2008, he joined AlbinoLeffe from Udinese in a co-ownership deal.

In July 2009 AlbinoLeffe terminated his contract by mutual consent.

In December 2010 he joined Americana on a 2-year contract.
