= Kaio Ganga =

Brazilian footballer

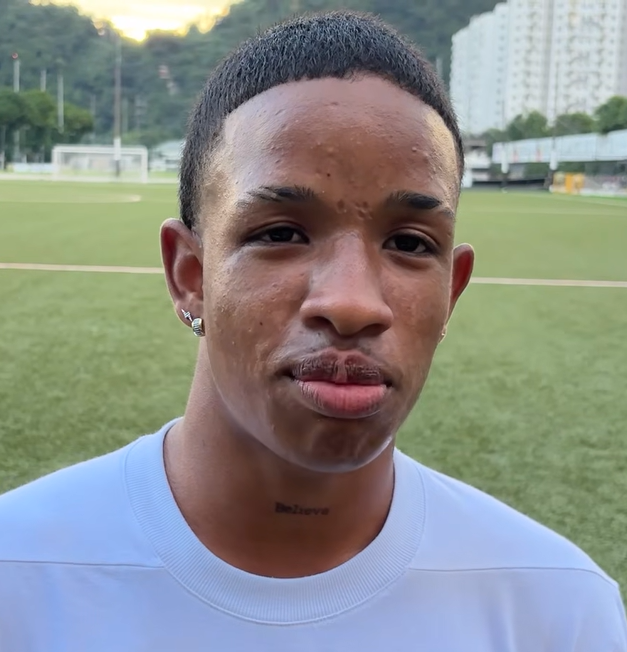
- Kaio Ganga in 2026

Personal information
- Full name: Kaio Vitoriano Ganga
- Date of birth: 23 January 2007 (age 19)
- Place of birth: Teixeira de Freitas, Brazil
- Height: 1.74 m (5 ft 9 in)
- Position: Winger

Team information
- Current team: Santos
- Number: 29

Youth career
- 2021–2026: Ponte Preta
- 2026–: Santos

Senior career*
Years	Team	Apps	(Gls)
2025–2026	Ponte Preta	4	(0)
2026–	Santos	0	(0)
- * Club domestic league appearances and goals as of 03:29, 26 April 2026 (UTC)

Kaio Vitoriano Ganga (born 23 January 2007) is a Brazilian footballer who plays as a winger for Santos.

== Career ==
Born in Teixeira de Freitas, Bahia, Kaio Ganga joined Ponte Preta's youth sides in 2021. In August 2025, after being the top scorer of the under-20 team, he was promoted to the main squad by head coach Marcelo Fernandes.

Kaio Ganga made his senior debut on 30 August 2025, coming on as a second-half substitute for Luiz Felipe in a 1–0 Série C home win over Londrina. He subsequently returned to the under-20s, where he gained notoriety after receiving a yellow card for an "unsportsmanlike conduct" in their opening match of the 2026 Copa São Paulo de Futebol Júnior, when he was making keepie uppies in that play.

On 27 March 2026, Kaio Ganga moved to Santos on a two-year contract, being initially assigned to the under-20 team.

== Career statistics ==
As of 26 April 2026.

Club	Season	League			State League		Cup		Continental		Other		Total	
Club	Season	Division	Apps	Goals	Apps	Goals	Apps	Goals	Apps	Goals	Apps	Goals	Apps	Goals
Ponte Preta	2025	Série C	1	0	0	0	—		—		—		1	0
Ponte Preta	2026	Série B	0	0	3	0	—		—		—		3	0
Career total			1	0	3	0	0	0	0	0	0	0	4	0
