= Fabrício Bento =

Brazilian footballer and manager (born 1975)

Personal information
- Full name: Fabrício Bento da Cunha
- Date of birth: 1 May 1975 (age 51)
- Place of birth: São Paulo, Brazil
- Height: 1.84 m (6 ft 0 in)
- Position: Centre back

Youth career
- 1992–1997: Portuguesa
- 1993–1994: → Taubaté (loan)

Senior career*
Years	Team	Apps	(Gls)
1998–2002	Portuguesa		
1999	→ São José-SP (loan)		
2000	→ Avaí (loan)		
2001	→ Mogi Mirim (loan)		
2002–2003	Beitar Jerusalem		
2003	Corinthians Alagoano		
2004	Maccabi Ahi Nazareth	17	(1)
2004	Anapolina		
2004–2005	Beitar Jerusalem	21	(1)
2005	Anapolina	7	(0)
2006	Juventus-SP		
2006–2007	Juventude	37	(6)
2007–2008	Avaí	13	(0)
2009	Catanduvense	6	(0)
2010–2011	Sendas		

Managerial career
- 2011–2012: Biguaçu
- 2013: Operário Ferroviário (assistant)
- 2013–2014: Avaí U15
- 2014–2016: Avaí U17
- 2016–2020: Avaí U20
- 2020–2022: Avaí U17
- 2022: Avaí (interim)
- 2022: Avaí (interim)
- 2023: Avaí (assistant)
- 2023: Avaí (interim)
- 2024–2025: Portuguesa U20
- * Club domestic league appearances and goals

Fabrício Bento da Silva (born 1 May 1975), known as Fabrício Bento or just Fabrício, is a Brazilian professional football coach and former player who played as a central defender.

== Playing career ==
Born in São Paulo, Fabrício began his career with hometown side Portuguesa. In 2002, after loans at São José-SP, Avaí and Mogi Mirim, he moved abroad with Beitar Jerusalem in Israel.

Fabrício returned to his home country in 2003, with Corinthians Alagoano, but returned to Israel in the following year after signing for Maccabi Ahi Nazareth. He then represented Anapolina for a short period before returning to Beitar Jerusalem.

After a short period back at Anapolina, Fabrício subsequently played for Juventus-SP before joining Série A side Juventude in April 2006. Initially a starter, he lost his starting spot and moved to Avaí in June 2007.

On 5 February 2009, Fabrício was presented at Catanduvense. He signed for Sendas in the following year, and retired in 2011 at the age of 35.

== Coaching career ==
Shortly after retiring, Fabrício was appointed head coach of Esporte Clube Biguaçu, and won the third division of the Campeonato Catarinense. In 2013, after a period working as an assistant coach at Operário Ferroviário, he returned to Avaí and was named head coach of the under-15 squad.

Fabrício worked as coach of the under-17 and under-20 squads, before being named interim head coach of the main squad on 7 February 2022, after the departure of Claudinei Oliveira.

Fabrício was an interim of Avaí on two further occasions, before leaving the club at the end of the 2023 season. On 2 July 2024, he returned to his first club Portuguesa after being named head coach of the under-20 team.

== Honours ==
=== Coach ===
Biguaçu

- Campeonato Catarinense Série B: 2011
