= Buião (footballer, born 1946) =

Brazilian footballer

Personal information
- Full name: João Bosco dos Santos
- Date of birth: 31 January 1946 (age 80)
- Place of birth: Vespasiano, Minas Gerais, Brazil
- Height: 1.68 m (5 ft 6 in)
- Position: Right winger

Senior career*
Years	Team	Apps	(Gls)
1964–1967	Atlético Mineiro	155	(25)
1968–1970	Corinthians	57	(2)
1971	Flamengo	43	(5)
1972	Grêmio	9	(0)
1973	Atlético Paranaense		
1974	Sampaio Corrêa		
1975	Rio Negro-AM		
1975–1976	Atlético Paranaense		
1978–1983	Colorado-PR		
- * Club domestic league appearances and goals as of 8 November 2025

João Bosco dos Santos (born 31 January 1946), better known as Buião, is a Brazilian former professional footballer who played as right winger.

== Career ==
A speedy winger, Buião was brought to Atlético Mineiro along with his brothers Geraldinho and Zé by his uncle, the former defender Afonso Bandejão, who had been a state champion several times with the club. Of the three, Buião was the only one to succeed as a professional, becoming an idol at the club, where he made 155 appearances and scored 25 goals, playing from 1964 to 1967. In 1968 he was acquired by SC Corinthians in one of the most expensive transfers in Brazilian football at the time.

He later played for Flamengo, Grêmio, Athletico Paranaense, Sampaio Corrêa, Rio Negro and Colorado. Buião ended his career in the Colorado vs Atlético Mineiro match, valid for the 1983 Campeonato Brasileiro Série A, being honored by both teams. After retiring as a player, he started working in school transportation.

Despite being recognized as a talented player, Buião didn't win any titles with the clubs he played for, and after retiring, he described himself as incredibly unlucky. His nickname "Buião" originated from the fact that he was short and stocky.
