= Aarão Alves =

Brazilian footballer and manager (born 1974)

Personal information
- Full name: Aarão Alves dos Santos
- Date of birth: 26 August 1974 (age 52)
- Place of birth: Santos, Brazil
- Position: Left back

Senior career*
Years	Team	Apps	(Gls)
- Portuguesa Santista

Managerial career
- 2005–2006: Jabaquara U20
- 2007: Jabaquara
- 2007–2009: Paulista U20
- 2009–2010: Paulista
- 2011–2013: Jabaquara
- 2013–2016: Santos U17
- 2017–2018: Santos U20
- 2018–2019: Shandong Luneng U20
- 2020–2021: Santos U20
- 2022: Baré
- 2023: Jabaquara U20
- * Club domestic league appearances and goals

Aarão Alves dos Santos (born 26 August 1974), known as Aarão Alves, is a Brazilian retired footballer who played as a left back, and is a current manager.

== Career ==
Born in Santos, São Paulo, Alves made his senior debut with Portuguesa Santista, but played professionally for a short period. He began his managerial career with Jabaquara's under-20 team in 2005. In 2007, he was in charge of the main squad for a brief period before being named manager of Paulista's under-20s.

Alves took over Paulista's main squad for the 2009 Copa Paulista, taking the club to the finals but eventually losing it to Fernando Diniz's Votoraty. On 19 February 2010, after only two wins in nine matches during the 2010 Campeonato Paulista, he was dismissed.

On 9 August 2013, after working for Jabaquara again, Alves joined Santos as an under-17 manager. On 20 January 2017, he was appointed at the helm of the under-20s.

Alves was dismissed by Peixe on 6 April 2018, after a poor performance in the year's Copa do Brasil Sub-20. He subsequently worked for Shandong Luneng before returning to his previous role in October 2020.

== Personal life ==
Alves' father Manoel Maria was a footballer. A winger, he notably represented Santos during the later part of the Os Santásticos (1968–1973).
