= Orlando Ribeiro (footballer) =

Brazilian footballer

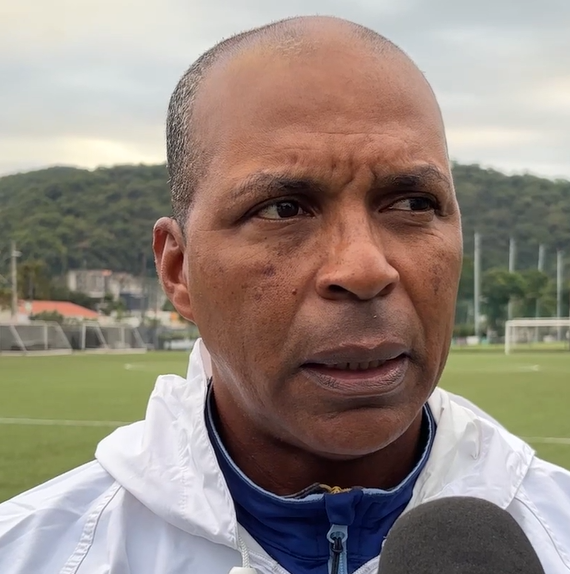
- Ribeiro in 2024

Personal information
- Full name: Orlando Ribeiro de Oliveira
- Date of birth: 9 January 1967 (age 59)
- Place of birth: São Paulo, Brazil
- Height: 1.88 m (6 ft 2 in)
- Position: Centre back

Youth career
- 1978–1985: Juventus-SP

Senior career*
Years	Team	Apps	(Gls)
1985–1989	Juventus-SP		
1990–1993	Ituano		
1993	Atlético Mineiro	16	(1)
1994	Ituano		
1995	Londrina		
1996	Sãocarlense		
1997	Francana		
1998	União Barbarense	24	(1)
1998	Santo André		
1999	Náutico		
1999	Etti Jundiaí	4	(0)
2000	São José-SP	24	(1)
2001	Santo André	5	(0)
2002	Mirassol		
2003	Vila Nova		
2004	Noroeste		

Managerial career
- 2011–2013: São Paulo U15
- 2014–2018: São Paulo U17
- 2018–2021: São Paulo U20
- 2021–2022: Palmeiras U17
- 2022–2024: Santos U20
- 2022: Santos (interim)
- 2025: Corinthians U20
- 2025: Corinthians (interim)
- * Club domestic league appearances and goals

Orlando Ribeiro de Oliveira (born 9 January 1967), known as Orlando Ribeiro or just Orlando, is a Brazilian football coach and former player who played as a central defender.

== Playing career ==
Born in São Paulo, Orlando began his career with Juventus-SP's youth setup at the age of 11. After appearing with the first team, he played for Ituano before joining Série A side Atlético Mineiro in 1993.

Orlando returned to Ituano in 1994, and went on to play for clubs in his native state, such as Sãocarlense, Francana, União Barbarense, Santo André, Etti Jundiaí and São José-SP before retiring at the age of 37. With Barbarense, he won the 1998 Campeonato Paulista Série A2.

== Coaching career ==
Ribeiro joined São Paulo in 2010 as a technical evaluator, being named coach of the under-15s in the following year. He took over the under-17s in 2014, before replacing André Jardine at the helm of the under-20 squad on 21 March 2018.

Ribeiro was sacked by the Tricolor on 16 February 2021, and was named in charge of the under-17 team of Palmeiras on 22 July. He left the post the following 28 February, to take over the under-20 squad of Santos.

On 12 September 2022, Ribeiro was named interim coach of Santos' first team, replacing departing Lisca. Late in the month, he was kept as head coach until the end of the season.

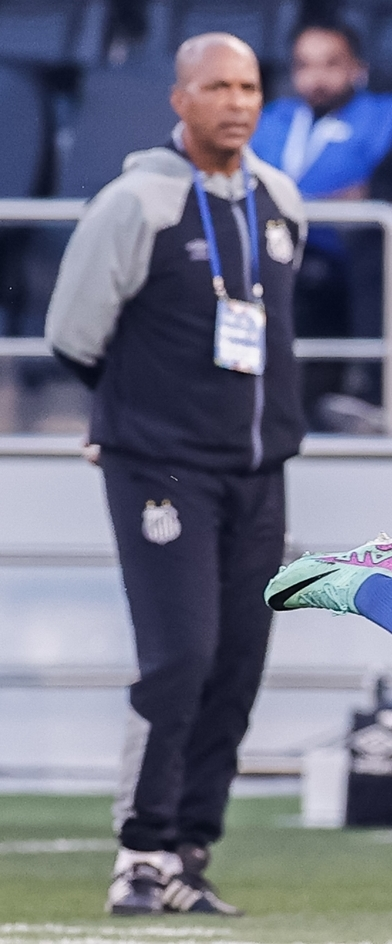
Ribeiro as a coach of Santos U20 in 2024

Back to the under-20s for the 2023 season, Ribeiro was dismissed from Peixe on 29 September 2024. Eleven days later, he moved to Corinthians under the same role.

On 17 April 2025, Ribeiro was named interim head coach of Corinthians, after Ramón Díaz was sacked. He returned to his previous role on 28 April, after the appointment of Dorival Júnior, and was sacked from the under-20 team on 28 July.

== Career statistics ==
Club	Season	League			State League		Cup		Continental		Other		Total	
Club	Season	Division	Apps	Goals	Apps	Goals	Apps	Goals	Apps	Goals	Apps	Goals	Apps	Goals
Atlético Mineiro	1993	Série A	9	0	7	1	0	0	2 (Note: Appearance(s) in Copa CONMEBOL)	0	2 (Note: Appearance(s) in Copa de Oro)	0	20	1
União Barbarense	1998	Paulista A2	—		24	1	—		—		—		24	1
Etti Jundiaí	1999	Paulista A2	—		4	0	—		—		—		4	0
São José-SP	2000	Paulista A2	—		24	1	—		—		—		24	1
Santo André	2001	Paulista A2	—		5	0	—		—		—		5	0
Career total			9	0	64	3	0	0	2	0	2	0	77	3

== Coaching statistics ==
As of 28 April 2025

Coaching record by team and tenure
Team	Nat	From	To	Record								Ref
Team	Nat	From	To	G	W	D	L	GF	GA	GD	Win %	Ref
Santos (interim)	(Brazil)	12 September 2022	13 November 2022	12	4	1	7	15	17	−2	33.33	
Corinthians (interim)	(Brazil)	17 April 2025	28 April 2025	3	2	0	1	3	5	−2	66.67	
Total				15	6	1	8	18	22	−4	40.00	—

== Honours ==
=== Player ===
Juventus-SP

- Copa São Paulo de Futebol Júnior: 1985

União Barbarense

- Campeonato Paulista Série A2: 1998

=== Manager ===
São Paulo U20

- Copa São Paulo de Futebol Júnior: 2019
