= Eduardo Oliveira (footballer, born 1982) =

Brazilian football manager

Personal information
- Full name: Eduardo Gonçalves Torres de Oliveira
- Date of birth: 26 May 1982 (age 44)
- Place of birth: Rio de Janeiro, Brazil
- Height: 6 ft 5 in (1.96 m)
- Position: Centre back

Youth career
- Democrata-SL
- Goiás

College career
Years	Team	Apps	(Gls)
2003–2006	West Florida Argonauts	59	(9)

Senior career*
Years	Team	Apps	(Gls)
2009	Panama City Beach Pirates	4	(0)

Managerial career
- 2007–2009: West Florida Argonauts (assistant)
- 2009: Panama City Beach Pirates (assistant)
- 2011: Brazil Women (assistant)
- 2018–2019: Fluminense U17
- 2020–2022: Fluminense U20
- 2022: Cuiabá (assistant)
- 2022: Cuiabá (interim)
- 2022–2023: Atlético Mineiro U20
- 2023–2024: Botafogo U20
- * Club domestic league appearances and goals

Eduardo Gonçalves Torres de Oliveira (born 26 May 1982), known as Eduardo Oliveira, is a Brazilian football coach.

== Playing career ==
Born in Rio de Janeiro, Oliveira started to play football at young age in his hometown, before being invited to play in Minas Gerais with Democrata de Sete Lagoas. He subsequently played for Goiás before being invited to play college soccer in the United States.

Oliveira joined University of West Florida's West Florida Argonauts in 2003. He started in 57 of his 59 matches during his four-year spell, scoring nine goals and providing one assist. In 2006, he was named in NCAA Division II's All-America team, being the first player from the UWF to be included.

In 2009, Oliveira played in four USL Premier Development League matches for Panama City Beach Pirates.

== Managerial career ==
In 2007, Oliveira remained with the Argonauts, as an assistant coach. In the summer of 2009, he moved to the Panama City Beach Pirates after being hired as an assistant coach.

Oliveira returned to his home country in 2010, after being invited by the Brazilian Football Confederation to work as a fitness coach of the Brazil women's under-20 team. He later became an assistant fitness coach of the full side in the 2011 FIFA Women's World Cup, being also an assistant of Jorge Barcellos for a brief period in 2011.

Oliveira joined Botafogo in 2012, as a technical coordinator, and was subsequently invited by Nike in 2014 and 2015 to manage the Rio de Janeiro-based team for the Nike Most Wanted trials, which later selected players for the Nike Academy. He joined Fluminense in 2017, as a youth coordinator. He took over the under-17 team in May 2018, and was appointed in charge of the under-20s on 16 December 2019.

On 21 January 2022, Fluminense announced the departure of Oliveira from his under-20 role, after stating that he resigned after "receiving an offer"; he was replaced by his brother. Just hours later, ge revealed that he had accepted an offer from Cuiabá to manage the club in the Campeonato Mato-Grossense; the deal was officially announced three days later, as he was named the club's permanent assistant manager and interim for the state league.

Oliveira made his managerial debut for Dourado on 26 January 2022, in a 2–1 away win over União Rondonópolis. After another three matches in charge, he moved to the assistant role after the appointment of Pintado.

On 7 May 2022, Oliveira left Cuiabá, and returned to the under-20 category after being named in charge of Atlético Mineiro.

== Personal life ==
Oliveira's younger brother Guilherme is also a football manager, and both worked together at Fluminense and Botafogo. Their father Eraldo Torres was a footballer, and played for the likes of America-RJ, Bangu, São Cristóvão and Americano before becoming a manager.

== Managerial statistics ==
As of 4 February 2022.

Managerial record by team and tenure
Team	Nat	From	To	Record								Ref
Team	Nat	From	To	G	W	D	L	GF	GA	GD	Win %	Ref
Cuiabá	(Brazil)	21 January 2022	6 February 2022	4	3	0	1	7	5	+2	75.00	
Total				4	3	0	1	7	5	+2	75.00	—
