= Estádio Municipal Alfredo Chiavegato =

Football stadium in Jaguariúna, São Paulo, Brazil

Coordinates: 22.68378665°S 46.99709567°W

Estádio Alfredo Chiavegato
- Campo do Nassif
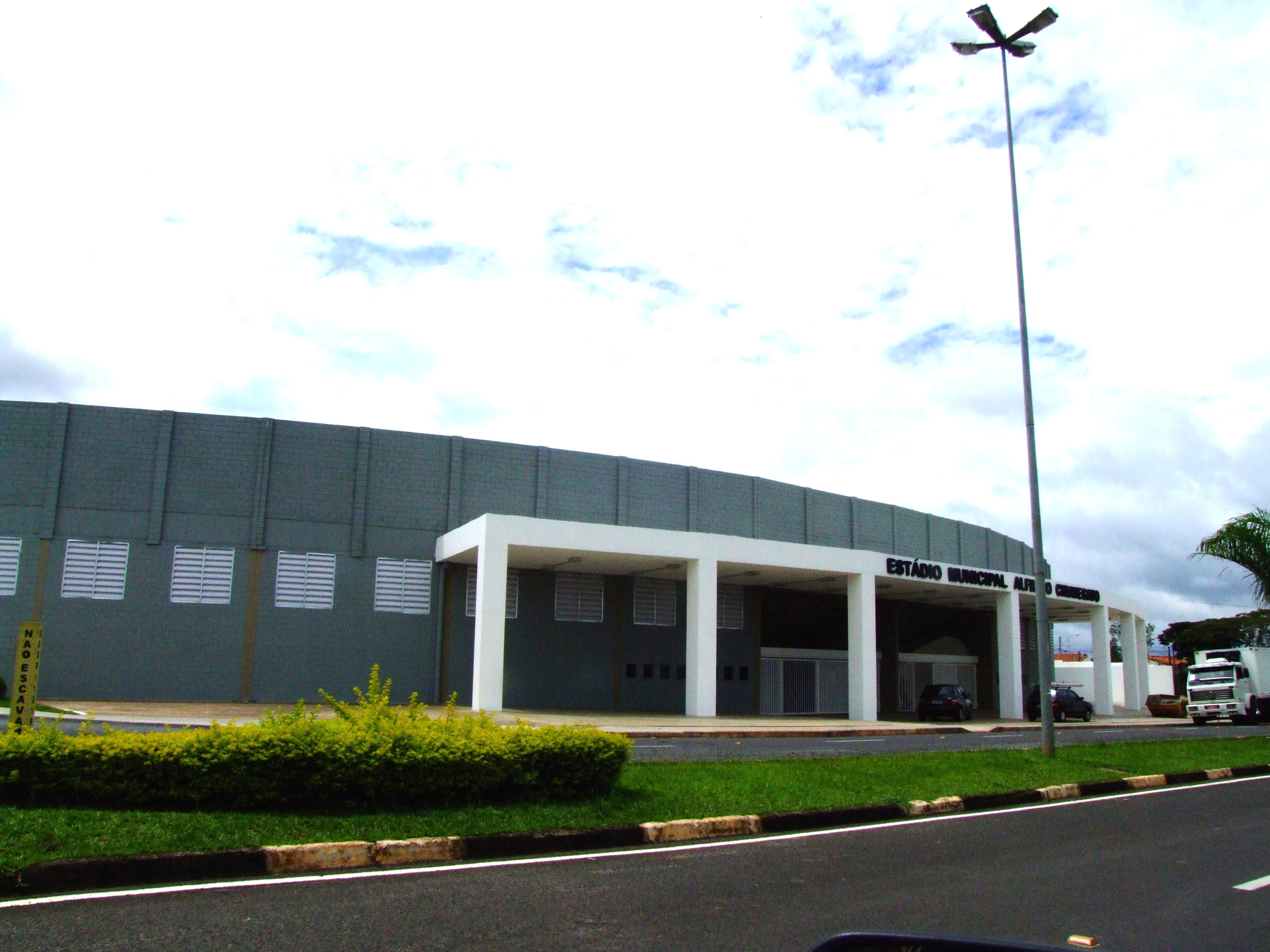
- Sisbrace
- Interactive map of Estádio Alfredo Chiavegato
- Full name: Estádio Municipal Alfredo Chiavegato
- Location: Jaguariúna, São Paulo, Brazil
- Owner: Municipality of Jaguariúna
- Capacity: 15,000
- Surface: Natural grass
- Field size: 105 by 68 metres (114.8 yd × 74.4 yd)

Construction
- Opened: 1996
- Renovated: 2008

Tenant
- Jaguariuna FC

Estádio Municipal Alfredo Chiavegato is a multi-use stadium in Jaguariúna, São Paulo, Brazil. It is currently used mostly for football matches. The stadium has a capacity of 15,000 spectators and it opened in 1996.
