= Celso Roth =

Brazilian footballer and manager (born 1957)

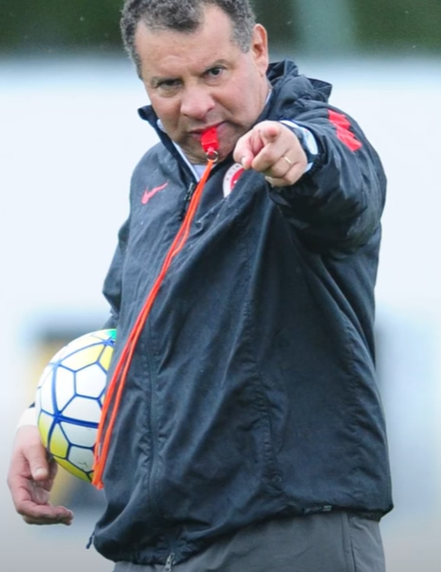

Personal information
- Full name: Celso Juarez Roth
- Date of birth: 30 November 1957 (age 68)
- Place of birth: Caxias do Sul, Brazil
- Position: Centre-back

Senior career*
Years	Team	Apps	(Gls)
1975–1978	Juventude		

Managerial career
- 1988–1990: Al Qadisiya
- 1990–1991: Indonesia U20
- 1991–1992: Qatar U20
- 1992: Al Etehad
- 1993–1994: Internacional
- 1994: Al-Ahli
- 1995: Brasil de Pelotas
- 1996: Juventus Jaraguá
- 1996: Esportivo
- 1996: Caxias
- 1996–1998: Internacional
- 1998: Vitória
- 1998–1999: Grêmio
- 2000: Sport Recife
- 2000: Grêmio
- 2001: Palmeiras
- 2002: Santos
- 2002: Internacional
- 2003: Atlético Mineiro
- 2004: Goiás
- 2005: Flamengo
- 2005: Botafogo
- 2007: Vasco da Gama
- 2008–2009: Grêmio
- 2009: Atlético Mineiro
- 2010: Vasco da Gama
- 2010–2011: Internacional
- 2011: Grêmio
- 2012: Cruzeiro
- 2014: Coritiba
- 2015: Vasco da Gama
- 2016: Internacional
- 2022–2023: Juventude
- * Club domestic league appearances and goals

Celso Juarez Roth (born 30 November 1957) is a Brazilian football coach and former player who played as a central defender.

== Coaching career ==
On 4 May 2009, the former Grêmio coach joined Atlético Mineiro until the end of the season, he replaced Émerson Leão. On 12 June 2010. Roth was appointed as the coach of Internacional. About two-month after being appointed, he was rewarded with the 2010 Copa Libertadores title as Internacional beat Guadalajara in a two-leg final. On 8 April 2011, Roth was sacked with a decision from the board meeting. He had been criticized among fans since Internacional’s defeat to TP Mazembe in the Club World Cup semi-final match in December 2010.

=== Criticism ===
Roth has often been the target of criticism by players, fans and media pundits. He was named the worst manager in Brazilian football in a poll contested by Série A and Série B players.

Roth was blamed by Souza to have costed Grêmio the 2008 Série A title, who called him stubborn, while Lopes claimed his tenure under Roth was humiliating. Former Vasco players Andrade and Fábio Braz also made negative remarks about Roth, calling him arrogant. Ilan, who played under Roth at Internacional, said the manager "destroys everywhere he goes".

== Honors ==
Internacional

- Campeonato Gaúcho: 1997
- Copa Libertadores: 2010

Grêmio

- Campeonato Gaúcho: 1999
- Copa Sul: 1999

Sport Recife

- Copa do Nordeste: 2000
