= Deaths in November 2016 =

The following is a list of notable deaths in November 2016.

Entries for each day are listed alphabetically by surname. A typical entry lists information in the following sequence:

- Name, age, country of citizenship and reason for notability, established cause of death, reference.

== November 2016 ==
=== 1 ===
- Sverre Andersen, 80, Norwegian football player and manager (Viking, national team), cancer.
- Tina Anselmi, 89, Italian politician, Minister of Health (1978–1979).
- Richard Ayling, 64, British Olympic rower.
- Rosanne Bailey, 66, American air force general and academic administrator.
- Auke Bloembergen, 89, Dutch jurist and legal scholar.
- Dave Broadfoot, 90, Canadian comedian (Royal Canadian Air Farce).
- Jean-Michel Damian, 69, French music radio journalist, complications during surgery.
- Jan C. Dolan, 89, American politician, respiratory failure.
- Wim Ernes, 58, Dutch national equestrian coach.
- Tatsuya Futakami, 84, Japanese professional shogi player, pneumonia.
- Harold B. Hairston, 76, American fire commissioner.
- Rodolfo Hinostroza, 75, Peruvian poet.
- Don Kates, 75, American lawyer.
- Bap Kennedy, 54, Northern Irish singer-songwriter, pancreatic and bowel cancer.
- Pit Kroke, 80, German artist and architect.
- Pocho La Pantera, 65, Argentine singer, kidney cancer.
- Mel Larson, 87, American racing driver.
- Martin Leach, 59, British automotive executive (NextEV Formula E Team), cancer.
- Stanford Lipsey, 89, American publisher.
- Massimo Mongai, 65, Italian author.
- Earl E. Nelson, 79, American politician.
- John Orsino, 78, American baseball player (Baltimore Orioles).
- John L. Saksun, 94, Slovak-born Canadian tool and die maker.
- John Thompson, 92, Canadian politician.
- Zhang Benren, 87, Chinese geochemist and academician (Chinese Academy of Sciences).

=== 2 ===
- Max Alexander, 63, American comedian and actor (Forgetting Sarah Marshall, Trainwreck, Punchline), head and neck cancer.
- Bob Cranshaw, 83, American jazz bassist (Blue Note Records, Musicians Union), cancer.
- Vern Handrahan, 79, Canadian baseball player (Kansas City Athletics).
- Jud Kinberg, 91, American producer (The Collector).
- Dolores Klosowski, 93, American baseball player (Milwaukee Chicks).
- A. Thomas Kraabel, 81, American classics scholar.
- Martin Lippens, 82, Belgian footballer (Anderlecht, national team) and coach.
- Korkut Özal, 87, Turkish engineer and politician.
- Oleg Popov, 86, Russian clown (Moscow State Circus), heart attack.
- Samuel Schatzmann, 61, Swiss equestrian, Olympic silver medalist (1988).
- Jan Slepian, 95, American author and poet.
- Jean-Marie Trappeniers, 74, Belgian footballer (Anderlecht, national team).
- Giorgos Vasiliou, 66, Greek actor, lung cancer.
- Egon Wolff, 90, Chilean playwright.

=== 3 ===
- Fat'hi Abu Taleb, 83, Jordanian army general and diplomat.
- W. D. Amaradeva, 88, Sri Lankan violinist, singer and composer.
- Misha Brusilovsky, 85, Russian artist.
- Vladimír Černý, 90, Slovak Olympic modern pentathlete (1956).
- Clive Derby-Lewis, 80, South African politician, MP (1987–1989), convicted of conspiracy to murder Chris Hani, lung cancer.
- Maurice Gaffney, 100, Irish barrister.
- Yawar Hayat Khan, 73, Pakistani television producer, lung disease.
- Börje Lampenius, 94, Finnish actor and director.
- John S. Matijevich, 88, American politician, member of the Illinois House of Representatives (1967–1992).
- Marc Michel, 83, Swiss actor (The Umbrellas of Cherbourg, Lola).
- Walter Piludu, 66, Italian politician, President of the Province of Cagliari (1988–1990).
- Antonio Preto, 51, Italian politician.
- Turid Karlsen Seim, 71, Norwegian theologian.
- Mangat Ram Sharma, 88, Indian politician.
- Kay Starr, 94, American singer ("Wheel of Fortune", "The Rock and Roll Waltz"), complications from Alzheimer's disease.
- Rick Steiner, 69, American producer (The Producers, Hairspray).
- Lene Tiemroth, 73, Danish actress (Italian for Beginners).
- Xia Meng, 84, Hong Kong actress.
- Jiyuan Yu, 52, Chinese moral philosopher, cancer.

=== 4 ===
- Eddie Carnett, 100, American baseball player (Boston Braves, Chicago White Sox, Cleveland Indians).
- DeVan Dallas, 90, American politician, member of the Mississippi House of Representatives (1964–1976).
- Claude de Kemoularia, 94, French diplomat and banker.
- Sylvio dos Santos, 81, Brazilian Olympic swimmer.
- Allen Eller, 39, American soccer player (Baltimore Blast, Ohio Vortex).
- MaDonna Grimes, 54, American choreographer and personal trainer, cancer.
- Eddie Harsch, 59, Canadian keyboardist (The Black Crowes).
- Bent Jensen, 91, Danish Olympic rower.
- Khalid Kelly, 49, Irish Islamist (al-Muhajiroun), suicide bombing.
- Max Mallmann, 48, Brazilian novelist, short story writer and screenwriter (Malhação, Coração de Estudante, A Grande Família), lung cancer.
- Col Miller, 92, Australian politician, member of the Queensland Legislative Assembly for Ithaca (1966–1986).
- Jeanette Miller, 84, American actress (The Middle, Norbit, Four Christmases).
- Jean-Jacques Perrey, 87, French electronic music producer, lung cancer.
- Mansour Pourheidari, 70, Iranian football player and manager (Esteghlal, national team), cancer.
- Gunnar Sandgren, 87, Swedish novelist.
- Ziaul Haque Zia, 63, Bangladeshi politician, Minister of Local Government (2001–2006).

=== 5 ===
- John Carson, 89, English actor (Doomsday, Captain Kronos – Vampire Hunter, Doctor Who).
- Marc de Bonte, 26, Belgian kickboxer, Muay thai world championship silver medalist (2012).
- Israel Cavazos Garza, 93, Mexican historian.
- Ralph Cicerone, 73, American scientist, President of National Academy of Sciences (2005–2016).
- Rolando Espinosa, 66, Filipino politician, shot.
- W. Eugene Hansen, 88, American religious leader (LDS Church), Alzheimer's disease.
- M. R. Khan, 88, Bangladeshi paediatrician and professor.
- Mel Lawrence, 81, American filmmaker and festival promoter.
- Arnold Mesches, 93, American artist.
- Julius Oketta, 60, Ugandan army general and politician.
- Abdulla Oripov, 75, Uzbek poet, literary translator and politician, lyricist of State Anthem of Uzbekistan.
- Laurent Pardo, 55, French bassist (Elliott Murphy).
- Valentin Prokopov, 87, Russian Olympic water polo player.
- Rodolfo Stavenhagen, 84, Mexican sociologist.
- Marek Svatoš, 34, Slovak ice hockey player (Colorado Avalanche, Nashville Predators, Ottawa Senators), mixed drug intoxication.
- Andreas Vgenopoulos, 63, Greek businessman and lawyer, heart attack.
- Giles Waterfield, 67, British art historian and curator (Dulwich Picture Gallery), heart attack.

=== 6 ===
- Roddy Evans, 81, Welsh rugby union player.
- Mick Granger, 85, English footballer (York City), Alzheimer's disease.
- Edward Itta, 71, American Iñupiat politician, Mayor of North Slope Borough, Alaska (2005–2011), member of U.S. Arctic Research Commission (2012–2015), cancer.
- Chisela Kanchela, 29, Zambian Olympic swimmer (2004), diabetic attack.
- Biser Kirov, 74, Bulgarian pop singer.
- Zoltán Kocsis, 64, Hungarian pianist, conductor and composer.
- Rafael Francisco Martínez Sáinz, 81, Mexican Roman Catholic prelate, Auxiliary Bishop of Guadalajara (2002–2012).
- Thomas Martyn, 69, English rugby league player (Leigh, Warrington, national team).
- Lalatendu Bidyadhar Mohapatra, 52, Indian politician, multiple organ failure.
- Redovino Rizzardo, 77, Brazilian Roman Catholic prelate, Bishop of Dourados (2001–2015).
- Jos Romersa, 101, Luxembourgish Olympic gymnast (1936).
- Marc Sleen, 93, Belgian cartoonist and comics artist (The Adventures of Nero).
- Vautour, 7, French-born Irish-trained racehorse, euthanised.

=== 7 ===
- Zdeněk Altner, 69, Czech lawyer.
- Genjiro Arato, 70, Japanese filmmaker and actor (Zigeunerweisen), heart disease.
- May Claerhout, 77, Belgian artist, brain tumor.
- Leonard Cohen, 82, Canadian singer-songwriter ("Hallelujah", "Suzanne", "First We Take Manhattan"), poet and novelist, complications from a fall.
- Kanu Gandhi, 87, Indian scientist (NASA).
- Thomas Gardner, 93, English footballer (Everton).
- Phil Georgeff, 85, American racetrack announcer.
- Julie Gregg, 79, American actress (The Godfather, The Happy Time, Batman), cancer.
- Robert N. Hall, 96, American engineer and physicist.
- Ingibjörg Haraldsdóttir, 74, Icelandic poet and translator.
- Birger Jansen, 68, Norwegian Olympic ice hockey player (1972), (Frisk Asker) and sailor, cancer.
- Consolata Kline, 100, American hospital administrator.
- Mohamed Masmoudi, 91, Tunisian politician, Minister of Foreign Affairs (1970–1974).
- Jayawantiben Mehta, 77, Indian politician, MP (1989–1991, 1996–1998, 1999–2004).
- Silvano Miniati, 82, Italian politician and trade union organizer.
- Eric Murray, 74, Scottish footballer (Kilmarnock).
- Janet Reno, 78, American lawyer and politician, first female U.S. Attorney General (1993–2001), Parkinson's disease.
- Joe Ryan, 80, American politician, member of the Alaska House of Representatives (1997–1999).
- Samuel Sitta, 73, Tanzanian politician, MP (2005–2015).
- Howard Taylor, 76, British structural engineer.
- Sir Jimmy Young, 95, British radio personality (Radio 2) and singer ("Unchained Melody", "The Man from Laramie").

=== 8 ===
- Peter Brixtofte, 66, Danish politician, Tax Minister (1992–1993).
- Marlan Coughtry, 82, American baseball player (Boston Red Sox).
- Raoul Coutard, 92, French cinematographer (Breathless, Z) and film director (Hoa-Binh).
- Ian Cowan, 71, Scottish footballer (Partick Thistle, Falkirk, Dunfermline Athletic).
- Yaffa Eliach, 79, Polish-born American Holocaust historian.
- Kazimír Gajdoš, 82, Slovak footballer (Inter Bratislava, Czechoslovakia national team).
- Aide Ganasi, Papua New Guinean politician, MP (since 2012), heart attack.
- Giorgio Grigolli, 88, Italian politician, President of Trentino-Alto Adige/Südtirol (1967–1974) and Trentino (1974–1979).
- Junius Foy Guin Jr., 92, American federal judge.
- Ho Chih-chin, 64, Taiwanese politician, Minister of Finance (2006–2008).
- Bill Lapham, 82, American football player (Philadelphia Eagles, Minnesota Vikings).
- N. K. Mahajan, 97, Indian adventurer.
- Touran Mirhadi, 89, Iranian educator.
- Pertti Nieminen, 79, Finnish ice hockey player (HPK, TPS).
- Russ Nixon, 81, American baseball player (Boston Red Sox, Cleveland Indians) and manager (Atlanta Braves).
- V. P. Ramakrishna Pillai, 84, Indian politician.
- Marius Popp, 81, Romanian jazz pianist and composer.
- Eugene Roberts, 96, American neuroscientist.
- Helga Ruebsamen, 82, Dutch writer.
- Russell Schuh, 75, American linguist.
- John T. Skelly, 89, American journalist.
- Leon C. Standifer, 91, American soldier and author.
- Umberto Veronesi, 90, Italian oncologist.

=== 9 ===
- Emmanuel Kwasi Afranie, 73, Ghanaian football coach, traffic collision.
- Greg Ballard, 61, American basketball player (Washington Bullets, Golden State Warriors), prostate cancer.
- Jack Bodell, 76, English heavyweight boxer, British champion (1969–1970, 1971–1972).
- Branse Burbridge, 95, British WWII fighter pilot.
- Al Caiola, 96, American guitarist and composer.
- Eugene Galanter, 92, American cognitive psychologist.
- Osamu Ishiguro, 80, Japanese tennis player, Asian Games champion (1966).
- Irfan Shahîd, 90, Palestinian literature professor.
- Martin Stone, 69, British guitarist (The Action) and bookseller, cancer.
- La Veneno, 52, Spanish transsexual actress, singer and gossip celebrity, fall.
- Steve Wing, 64, American environmentalist, cancer.

=== 10 ===
- David Adamany, 80, American academic administrator, President of Temple University (2000–2006).
- Ken Ballantyne, 76, Scottish runner.
- Pierre Billard, 94, French film critic.
- Carlos Alberto Cunha, 57, Brazilian judoka.
- Trevor Johnson, 81, Australian footballer (Melbourne).
- Donald Keane, 85, Australian Olympic racewalker (1952, 1956).
- Nikola Korabov, 87, Bulgarian director and screenwriter (Tobacco).
- Francisco Nieva, 91, Spanish playwright.
- André Ruellan, 94, French science fiction and horror writer.
- Bill Stanfill, 69, American football player (Miami Dolphins), complications after a fall.
- Mr. 3-2, 44, American rapper (Blac Monks, Screwed Up Click), shot.

=== 11 ===
- Ilse Aichinger, 95, Austrian writer.
- Jum Jainudin Akbar, Filipino politician, member of the House of Representatives (since 2016), Governor of Basilan (2007–2016), cardiac arrest.
- Victor Bailey, 56, American bassist (Weather Report, Madonna, Lady Gaga), complications from Charcot-Marie-Tooth disease and amyotrophic lateral sclerosis.
- Uwe Bracht, 63, German footballer (Werder Bremen).
- Alfredo Bruto da Costa, 78, Portuguese politician.
- Željko Čajkovski, 91, Croatian football player (Dinamo Zagreb, Werder Bremen) and coach.
- Clarence Ditlow, 72, American automotive safety advocate, colon cancer.
- Doug Edwards, 70, Canadian musician and composer ("Wildflower"), cancer.
- Perico Fernández, 64, Spanish light-welterweight boxer, world champion (1974–1975), diabetes and Alzheimer's disease.
- Greg Horton, 65, American football player (Los Angeles Rams, Tampa Bay Buccaneers).
- Saki Kaskas, 45, Greek video game music composer (Need for Speed, Sleeping Dogs, Mass Effect 2), fentanyl overdose.
- Leonid Keldysh, 85, Russian physicist.
- Sir Ralph Kohn, 88, British medical scientist.
- Claire Labine, 82, American author, screenwriter and producer (Ryan's Hope, General Hospital, One Life to Live).
- Bonnie Laing, 79, Canadian politician, MLA for Calgary-Bow (1989–2001).
- Lily, 64, Japanese singer and actress (Shinobi: Heart Under Blade), lung cancer.
- Verna M. Linzey, 97, American evangelical theologian.
- Aileen Mehle, 98, American gossip columnist (The Miami Daily News, New York Journal-American, Women's Wear Daily).
- Sir James McNeish, 85, New Zealand writer.
- Ronnie Nathanielsz, 81, Sri Lankan-born Filipino sports journalist and commentator, cardiac arrest.
- A. Nayyar, 61, Pakistani playback singer, cardiac arrest.
- Pascal Posado, 91, French politician, member of the National Assembly for Bouches-du-Rhône (1978).
- Alfred Schmidt, 81, German footballer (Borussia Dortmund, national team).
- Ray Singleton, 79, American songwriter (Motown) and record producer, brain cancer.
- Róbert Söptei, 90, Hungarian Olympic sprint canoeist.
- Muhammad Surur, 77–78, Syrian religious leader.
- Turki II bin Abdulaziz Al Saud, 81–82, Saudi Arabian prince and politician.
- Sir Aubrey Trotman-Dickenson, 90, British chemist.
- Robert Vaughn, 83, American actor (The Man from U.N.C.L.E., The Magnificent Seven, Bullitt), Emmy winner (1978), leukemia.

=== 12 ===
- Mahmoud Abdel Aziz, 70, Egyptian actor (Al-Kit Kat).
- Malek Chebel, 63, Algerian anthropologist and philosopher, cancer.
- Dawn Coe-Jones, 56, Canadian golfer, chondrosarcoma.
- Punya Datta, 92, Indian cricketer (Bengal).
- Louis Devereux, 85, English cricketer (Worcestershire, Glamorgan).
- Ebenezer Donkor, 78, Ghanaian actor (2016).
- Jerry Dumas, 86, American cartoonist (Sam and Silo).
- Bob Francis, 77, Egyptian-born Australian radio broadcaster (5AA).
- Stanley G. Grizzle, 97, Canadian judge and political activist.
- Robert Kabel, 82, Canadian ice hockey player (New York Rangers).
- Catherine Kerr, 52, American neuroscientist, complications from multiple myeloma.
- Frank Konigsberg, 83, American talent agent and producer (The Tommyknockers).
- Adolf Kunstwadl, 76, German footballer (Bayern Munich, Wacker München).
- Sonny Levi, 90, Indian powerboat designer.
- Eivor Olson, 94, Swedish Olympic shot putter (1948, 1952).
- James Dale Ritchie, 40, American serial killer, shot.
- Howard Ruff, 85, American economist, Parkinson's disease.
- Juan Russo, 90, Argentine Olympic weightlifter.
- Edgard Sorgeloos, 85, Belgian racing cyclist.
- Lupita Tovar, 106, Mexican-American actress (Drácula, Santa, Miguel Strogoff), heart disease.
- Paul Vergès, 91, Thai-born French Réunionese politician, MEP (2004–2010), member of the National Assembly (1956–1958, 1986–1987, 1993–1996) and Senate (1996–2004, since 2011).
- Jacques Werup, 71, Swedish musician and writer, cancer.
- Yu Xu, 30, Chinese air force aerobatic and fighter pilot, plane collision.

=== 13 ===
- Jehangir Bader, 72, Pakistani politician, heart attack.
- Maria Pilar Busquets, 79, Spanish Aranese writer and politician, Síndica d'Aran (1991-1993) and member of Catalan Parliament (1984-1992).
- Luigi Caccia Dominioni, 102, Italian architect.
- Doris Egbring-Kahn, 90, German actress.
- Konrad Enke, 82, German Olympic swimmer.
- Aslaug Fadum, 91, Norwegian politician.
- Richard Gigger Jr., 87, American music director.
- Frederick Irving, 91, American diplomat, Ambassador to Iceland (1972-1976), Ambassador to Jamaica (1977-1978).
- Leslie Kenton, 75, American writer.
- Lary Kuharich, 70, American football coach (Calgary Stampeders, BC Lions), brain cancer.
- Billy Miller, 62, American music historian, complications from multiple myeloma, kidney failure and diabetes.
- Enzo Maiorca, 85, Italian free diver, television host and politician.
- Jackie Pigeaud, 79, French historian.
- Laurent Pokou, 69, Ivorian footballer (Rennes).
- Leon Russell, 74, American Hall of Fame musician (The Wrecking Crew) and songwriter ("Tight Rope").
- Don Rutherford, 79, English rugby union player.
- Sir Mota Singh, 86, British judge.
- Denys Smith, 92, British racehorse trainer.
- Randy Veres, 50, American baseball player (Milwaukee Brewers, Florida Marlins, Detroit Tigers).
- Aloysius Ferdinandus Zichem, 83, Surinamese Roman Catholic Redemptorist prelate, Bishop of Paramaribo (1971–2003).

=== 14 ===
- Hans Avé Lallemant, 78, Dutch-born American geologist.
- Diana Balmori, 84, American landscape designer.
- Vladimir Belov, 58, Russian handball player, Olympic silver medalist (1980).
- Houston Conwill, 69, American sculptor, prostate cancer.
- Ibrahim Dasuki, 93, Nigerian spiritual leader, Sultan of Sokoto (1988–1996).
- Holly Dunn, 59, American country music singer-songwriter ("Daddy's Hands", "Are You Ever Gonna Love Me", "You Really Had Me Going"), ovarian cancer.
- Marti Friedlander, 88, New Zealand photographer, breast cancer.
- Bob Gain, 87, American football player (Cleveland Browns).
- Gun Hellsvik, 74, Swedish politician, Minister of Justice (1991–1994), cancer.
- Roger Hobbs, 28, American author, overdose.
- Gwen Ifill, 61, American journalist (PBS NewsHour, Washington Week), endometrial cancer.
- Sebastian Leone, 91, American politician, pneumonia.
- Mahpiya Ska, 20, American albino buffalo.
- David Mancuso, 72, American DJ and founder of The Loft.
- Gardnar Mulloy, 102, American tennis player, winner of the US Open (1942, 1945, 1946, 1948) and Wimbledon Championships (1957), complications from a stroke.
- Janet Wright, 71, English-born Canadian actress (Corner Gas, The Perfect Storm, McCabe & Mrs. Miller).

=== 15 ===
- Bob Addis, 91, American baseball player (Chicago Cubs, Boston Braves).
- Mose Allison, 89, American jazz pianist, singer and songwriter ("Young Man Blues").
- Nana Afia Kobi Serwaa Ampem II, 109, Ghanaian royal, Queen mother of the Ashanti Empire.
- Cliff Barrows, 93, American music director (Billy Graham Evangelistic Association).
- Rod Bieleski, 85, New Zealand plant physiologist.
- Ray Brady, 79, Irish footballer (Millwall).
- Victor Brown, 95, Cuban-born British singer.
- Bobby Campbell, 60, Northern Irish footballer (Bradford City), suicide by hanging.
- Ishwar Dass Dhiman, 82, Indian politician.
- Sixto Durán Ballén, 95, Ecuadorian politician, President (1992–1996).
- Jules Eskin, 85, American cellist (Boston Symphony Orchestra), cancer.
- Ken Grieve, 74, British television director (The Bill, Peak Practice, Doctor Who).
- Daniel Leab, 80, German-born American historian.
- Lisa Lynn Masters, 52, American actress (The Stepford Wives, It's Complicated, Unbreakable Kimmy Schmidt), apparent suicide by hanging.
- Chester E. Norris, 88, American diplomat, Ambassador to Equatorial Guinea (1988–1992).
- Milt Okun, 92, American singer and music producer.
- Mukesh Rawal, 65, Indian actor (Ramayan), suicide by train.
- Paul Rosche, 82, German engineer (BMW).
- Selim Soydan, 75, Turkish Olympic footballer (1960).
- Ignacio Tinoco Jr., 85, American chemist.
- Clift Tsuji, 75, American politician, member of the Hawaii House of Representatives (since 2005).

=== 16 ===
- Len Allchurch, 83, Welsh footballer (Swansea City, Sheffield United, national team).
- Juan Amorós, 80, Spanish cinematographer.
- Dwayne Andreas, 98, American businessman.
- Jack Beckner, 86, American Olympic artistic gymnast.
- Joan Carroll, 85, American child actress (Meet Me in St. Louis).
- Teresita Castillo, 89, Filipino nun.
- Celedonio Espinosa, 83, Filipino Olympic boxer.
- Jay Wright Forrester, 98, American computer engineer and systems scientist.
- Melvin Laird, 94, American politician and writer, Secretary of Defense (1969–1973), U.S. Representative from Wisconsin's 7th congressional district (1953–1969), respiratory failure.
- Hans-Günter Neues, 66, German football player (Fortuna Köln, 1.FC Kaiserslautern) and coach.
- Enno Penno, 86, Estonian politician.
- Daniel Prodan, 44, Romanian footballer (Steaua Bucharest, Atlético Madrid, national team), heart attack.
- Guillaume Raskin, 79, Belgian footballer.
- Alex Stewart, 52, Jamaican Olympic boxer (1984), blood clot in lung.
- Larry Tucker, 81, American politician, member of the West Virginia House of Delegates (1970–1982) and Senate (1983–1989).
- Mentor Williams, 70, American songwriter and producer ("Drift Away", "When We Make Love"), lung cancer.
- Jean Wishart, 96, New Zealand journalist, editor of New Zealand Woman's Weekly (1952–1985).
- Yeh Changti, 82–83, Taiwanese aviator, member of the Black Cat Squadron, heart attack.

=== 17 ===
- Zenon Czechowski, 69, Polish Olympic cyclist (1968).
- Virgilio Godoy, 82, Nicaraguan politician, Vice President (1990–1995).
- Ruth Gruber, 105, American journalist (New York Herald Tribune).
- Marzieh Hadidchi, 77, Iranian Revolutionary Guard commander and politician, MP (1984–2000).
- Babanrao Haldankar, 89, Indian classical singer and composer.
- Joseph Khoury, 80, Lebanese-born Canadian Roman Catholic hierarch, Bishop of Saint Maron of Montreal (1996–2013).
- Angelo LiPetri, 86, American baseball player (Philadelphia Phillies).
- Khairulla Murtazin, 75, Russian mathematician.
- Fidel Negrete, 84, Mexican Olympic long-distance runner (1964), Pan American gold medalist (1963).
- John Ningark, 72, Canadian politician, member of the Legislative Assembly of the Northwest Territories (1989–1999) and Nunavut (2009–2013), cancer.
- Louis Pinton, 68, French politician.
- John Pridnia, 73, American politician, amyotrophic lateral sclerosis.
- Venancio Shinki, 84, Peruvian painter.
- Harry W. Shipps, 90, American Episcopal prelate, Bishop of Georgia (1985–1994).
- Srinivas Kumar Sinha, 90, Indian army general and politician, Governor of Assam (1997–2003), Arunachal Pradesh (1999) and Jammu and Kashmir (2003–2008).
- Whitney Smith, 76, American vexillologist, designer of the flag of Guyana, co-designer of the flag of Bonaire.
- Steve Truglia, 54, British stuntman (The Wolfman, Mission: Impossible – Rogue Nation, Hollyoaks), fall.
- Don Waller, 65, American music journalist and singer, lung cancer.
- Gérard Weber, 67, French politician.

=== 18 ===
- Haji Muhammad Adeel, 72, Pakistani politician, kidney failure.
- Denton Cooley, 96, American heart surgeon.
- Jerzy Cynk, 91, Polish-British aviation historian.
- Ed Francis, 90, American professional wrestler and promoter.
- Sharon Jones, 60, American singer (Sharon Jones & The Dap-Kings), pancreatic cancer.
- Valentin Kornev, 75, Russian sport shooter, Olympic silver medalist (1968).
- Yevgeni Lazarev, 79, Russian-American actor (Iron Man 2, The Sum of All Fears, Call of Duty 4: Modern Warfare), heart failure.
- Liu Sung-pan, 84, Taiwanese politician, member (1973–2004) and President (1992–1999) of the Legislative Yuan.
- Hugh McDonald, 62, Australian musician (Redgum), prostate cancer.
- Bob Mitchell, 80, Canadian politician.
- Francesco Parisi, 86, Italian politician, member of the Senate (1987–1994) and Parliament (1994–1996).
- Julio Pereyra, 53, Uruguayan Olympic basketball player.
- Kervin Piñerua, 25, Venezuelan volleyball player (national team), heart attack.
- Freddie L. Poston, 91, American lieutenant general in the United States Air Force.
- Théophane Matthew Thannickunnel, 88, Indian Roman Catholic prelate, Bishop of Jabalpur (1976–2001).
- Armando Tobar, 78, Chilean footballer (national team, Club Deportivo Universidad Católica), Alzheimer's disease.

=== 19 ===
- Sutan Bhatoegana, 59, Indonesian politician, liver cancer.
- Monk Bonasorte, 59, American football player (Florida State Seminoles), brain cancer.
- John C. Carpenter, 86, American politician, member of the Nevada Assembly (1986–2010).
- John Dale, 86, English cricketer (Kent, Lincolnshire).
- Larry Derryberry, 77, American politician.
- Martin Elkort, 87, American photographer.
- Donald Farley, 46, Canadian Olympic cross-country skier (1998, 2002), suspected heart attack.
- S. Scott Ferebee Jr., 95, American architect.
- Irving A. Fradkin, 95, American philanthropist, founder of Scholarship America.
- Gino Gavioli, 93, Italian comics artist and animator.
- Erwin Hecht, 83, German-born South African Roman Catholic prelate, Bishop of Kimberley (1974–2009).
- Jacques Henry, 74, French rally driver.
- Jan Huberts, 79, Dutch motorcycle road racer.
- Ida Levin, 53, American violinist, leukemia.
- Józef Mayer, 77, Polish chemist.
- Mike Oddy, 79, Scottish squash player.
- Aiace Parolin, 96, Italian cinematographer (Seduced and Abandoned, Keoma, The Birds, the Bees and the Italians).
- Christian Salaba, 45, Austrian footballer (Rapid Wien, Vienna).
- Paul Sylbert, 88, American production designer (Heaven Can Wait, The Prince of Tides, One Flew Over the Cuckoo's Nest), Oscar winner (1979).
- David Turner-Samuels, 98, British barrister.
- Hans Witsenhausen, 86, German-American control theorist.
- You Xiaozeng, 83, Chinese inorganic chemist and academician (Chinese Academy of Sciences).

=== 20 ===
- Gabriel Badilla, 32, Costa Rican footballer (Saprissa, New England Revolution), heart failure.
- Wimal Kumara de Costa, 68, Sri Lankan film actor (Bambaru Awith).
- Likhit Dhiravegin, 75, Thai political scientist and politician, cancer.
- Housseyn Fardjallah, 23, Algerian weightlifter, traffic collision.
- Konrad Glas, 76, German Olympic sailor.
- Maria Glazovskaya, 104, Russian scientist and agrochemist.
- Gene Guarilia, 78, American basketball player (Boston Celtics).
- Tim Heald, 72, British author and journalist.
- Hike Heiskell, 76, American politician.
- Janellen Huttenlocher, 84, American psychologist.
- Russell Kiefel, 65, Australian actor.
- Mita Mohi, 78, New Zealand rugby league player (Canterbury, national team), traditional Māori weaponry expert.
- Hod O'Brien, 80, American jazz pianist, cancer.
- Diógenes da Silva Matthes, 83, Brazilian Roman Catholic prelate, Bishop of Franca (1971–2006).
- Donald Smythe, 92, Canadian badminton player.
- Konstantinos Stephanopoulos, 90, Greek politician, President (1995–2005), pneumonia.
- Hemant Talwalkar, 62, Indian cricketer.
- William Trevor, 88, Irish writer (Love and Summer, Two Lives, The Children of Dynmouth).
- Ivan Živković, 69, Serbian diplomat, ambassador to Kenya.

=== 21 ===
- Kaylin Andres, 31, American blogger, cancer.
- Blakdyak, 47, Filipino reggae artist and comedian.
- Roscoe E. Dean, 80, American politician.
- Ergi Dini, 22, Albanian singer, motorcycle accident.
- Yehia El-Gamal, 86, Egyptian politician, Deputy Prime Minister (2011).
- Rose Evansky, 94, British hairdresser.
- Tom Fisher, 74, American baseball player (Baltimore Orioles).
- Edward L. Kimball, 86, American legal scholar and biographer.
- Masatoshi Kurata, 77, Japanese politician, cancer.
- Theresa Manuel, 90, American Olympic athlete and basketball player.
- Matthias Mauritz, 92, German Olympic football player (1952, 1956).
- John Nuraney, 79, Kenyan-born Canadian politician, MLA of British Columbia (2001–2009).
- Jean-Claude Risset, 78, French composer.
- Hassan Sadpara, 53, Pakistani mountaineer, cancer.
- Vladimir Semyonov, 78, Russian Olympic water polo player (1960, 1964, 1968).
- Jan Sonnergaard, 53, Danish writer, heart attack.
- René Vignal, 90, French footballer.
- Maximilian Ziegelbauer, 93, German Roman Catholic prelate, Auxiliary Bishop of Augsburg (1983–1998).

=== 22 ===
- Rainer Åkerfelt, 81, Finnish Olympic sprint canoeist.
- Tayssir Akla, 77, Syrian composer and conductor.
- M. Balamuralikrishna, 86, Indian Carnatic musician and composer.
- Donald Barker, 86, Canadian football official (Canadian Football League).
- Dorian Boose, 42, American football player (New York Jets, Washington Redskins, Edmonton Eskimos).
- Mike Burgoyne, 65, New Zealand rugby union player (North Auckland, national team).
- Chen Yingzhen, 79, Taiwanese writer.
- Clayton Counts, 43, American musician, drug overdose.
- Bill Dimock, 93, Canadian ice hockey player (Sudbury Wolves).
- Carlos Fayt, 98, Argentine lawyer and politician.
- Rosa Anna Garavoglia, 83, Italian executive.
- Edward Grover, 84, American actor (Baretta, Serpico, Death Wish).
- Richard Held, 94, American psychologist.
- Servaas Huys, 76, Dutch politician, member of the House of Representatives (1986–1998).
- Gloria Lane, 91, American operatic mezzo-soprano.
- M. G. K. Menon, 88, Indian physicist.
- John C. O'Riordan, 92, Irish-born Sierra Leonean Roman Catholic prelate, Bishop of Kenema (1984–2002).
- Moeenuddin Ahmad Qureshi, 86, Pakistani politician, Acting Prime Minister (1993), lung infection.
- Viveki Rai, 92, Indian author.
- Red Marauder, 26, British racehorse, winner of the 2001 Grand National.
- Judith Roberts, 82, American Olympic swimmer (1952).
- Peter Sumner, 74, Australian actor (Ned Kelly, Star Wars, Heartbreak High).
- Mathew Vattackuzhy, 86, Indian Syro-Malabar Catholic hierarch, Bishop of Kanjirappally (1986–2000).
- Ram Naresh Yadav, 90, Indian politician, Chief Minister of Uttar Pradesh (1977–1979), Governor of Chhattisgarh (2014) and Madhya Pradesh (2014–2016).

=== 23 ===
- Rita Barberá, 68, Spanish politician, Mayor of Valencia (1991–2015) and Senator (since 2015), heart attack due to cirrhosis.
- Ralph Branca, 90, American baseball player (Brooklyn Dodgers, Detroit Tigers).
- Brainbug, 57, Italian trance music producer and musician.
- Michel Deza, 77, Russian-born French mathematician.
- Richard Dougherty, 84, Canadian-born American ice hockey player, Olympic silver medalist (1956).
- John Ebersole, 72, American educator, President of Excelsior College (2006–2016), myelodysplastic syndrome.
- Joe Esposito, 78, American author and publisher, road manager for Elvis Presley.
- Paul Futcher, 60, English footballer (Manchester City, Barnsley, Grimsby Town), cancer.
- Bill Hewitt, 86, Australian politician, member of the Queensland Legislative Assembly for Chatsworth (1966–1977) and Greenslopes (1977–1983).
- Ernst Hilmar, 78, Austrian musicologist.
- Stan Huntsman, 84, American Olympic track and field coach, complications from a stroke.
- Karin Johannisson, 72, Swedish idea historian, cancer.
- Sagardeep Kaur, 35, Indian athlete, Asian champion (2002), traffic collision.
- Peggy Kirk Bell, 95, American professional golfer (LPGA).
- Joe Lennon, 81, Irish Gaelic footballer (Down).
- Renato López, 33, Mexican actor and television host, shot.
- Rocky Malebane-Metsing, 67, South African politician.
- Abdul-Karim Mousavi Ardebili, 90, Iranian cleric and jurist, Chief Justice of Iran (1981–1989).
- Guy Rousseau, 81, Canadian ice hockey player (Montreal Canadiens).
- Ryu Mi-yong, 95, North Korean politician, chairwoman of the Chondoist Chongu Party, lung cancer.
- Andrew Sachs, 86, German-born British actor (Fawlty Towers, Coronation Street, Hitler: The Last Ten Days), dementia.
- Fred Stobaugh, 99, American songwriter.
- K. Subash, 57, Indian director and screenwriter, kidney failure.
- Jerry Tucker, 91, American child actor (Our Gang).

=== 24 ===
- Michael Abbensetts, 78, Guyanese-born British playwright.
- Colonel Abrams, 67, American musician ("Trapped").
- Nadine Alari, 89, French actress.
- Marcos Ana, 96, Spanish communist activist, poet and veteran of the Spanish Civil War, political prisoner (1939-1961).
- Franklin Bishop, 84, American politician, member of New Hampshire House of Representatives (1994–2010, 2012–2014).
- Al Brodax, 90, American film and television producer (Yellow Submarine).
- Matthew Chan, 69, Hong Kong Olympic fencer (1972, 1976), cancer.
- Bob Chase, 90, American broadcaster (WOWO, Fort Wayne Komets), heart failure.
- Dave Ferriss, 94, American baseball player (Boston Red Sox).
- Shirley Bunnie Foy, 80, American jazz musician.
- Larry W. Fullerton, 65, American inventor, brain cancer.
- Royal U. Grote Jr., 70, American prelate, Bishop of the Reformed Episcopal Church.
- Florence Henderson, 82, American actress (The Brady Bunch, Song of Norway, The Sound of Music) and singer, heart failure.
- Ian Jones, 82, English Olympic field hockey player (1960, 1964) and cricketer.
- Prabhjot Kaur, 92, Indian author and poet.
- William Mandel, 99, American broadcast journalist, political activist and author.
- Boris Melnik, 71, Soviet Olympic sports shooter, silver medallist (1972).
- Luis Miquilena, 97, Venezuelan politician, Minister of Interior and Justice (2001–2002).
- Pauline Oliveros, 84, American composer and accordionist.
- George C. Royal, 95, American microbiologist.
- Sabrina, 80, British model and actress.
- Charles M. Stein, 96, American statistician.
- Tormod Petter Svennevig, 87, Norwegian diplomat and politician.
- Norm Swanson, 86, American basketball player (Rochester Royals).
- Jules Sylvain, 90, Canadian Olympic weightlifter.

=== 25 ===
- Muhammad Akhlaq Ahmed, 44, Pakistani Olympic field hockey player.
- Bernardo Álvarez Herrera, 60, Venezuelan diplomat, Ambassador to the United States (2003–2010).
- Ryan C. Amacher, 71, American economist.
- Erich Bloch, 91, German-born American electrical engineer, director of the National Science Foundation (1984–1990).
- John A. Carver Jr., 98, American politician.
- Fidel Castro, 90, Cuban politician, Prime Minister (1959–1976), President (1976–2008).
- Ron Glass, 71, American actor (Barney Miller, Firefly, Lakeview Terrace), respiratory failure.
- Jim Gillespie, 69, Scottish footballer (Dunfermline Athletic).
- Trevor Goddard, 85, South African cricketer.
- David Hamilton, 83, British photographer.
- Dwan Hurt, 53, American basketball coach (Serra Cavaliers).
- Zdzisław Konieczny, 86, Polish historian.
- Jake Krull, 77, American politician, member of the South Dakota Senate (1973–1983).
- Burton J. Lee III, 86, American doctor, White House physician under President George H. W. Bush, bladder cancer.
- Ivan Mikoyan, 89, Russian aircraft designer (Mikoyan MiG-29).
- Russell Oberlin, 88, American countertenor.
- Margaret Rhodes, 91, British writer, cousin of Elizabeth II.
- Richard Dean Rogers, 94, American district court judge, U. S. District Court for the District of Kansas (since 1975).
- Peter Schweri, 77, Swiss painter.
- Bill Skelton, 85, New Zealand jockey.
- Tom Taylor, Baron Taylor of Blackburn, 87, British politician, injuries sustained in traffic collision.
- Alexander Yossifov, 76, Bulgarian composer.

=== 26 ===
- Ida Blom, 85, Norwegian historian.
- Bill Endicott, 98, American baseball player (St. Louis Cardinals).
- Urii Eliseev, 20, Russian chess grandmaster, fall.
- Miriam Eshkol, 87, Israeli education administrator.
- Harry Flournoy, 72, American basketball player (UTEP).
- Alv Gjestvang, 79, Norwegian speed skater, Olympic silver medalist (1964), cancer.
- Peter Hintze, 66, German politician, General Secretary of the CDU (1992–1998), vice-president of the Bundestag (2013–2016).
- Murray Jack, 84, New Zealand cricketer.
- Peter Hans Kolvenbach, 87, Dutch religious leader, Superior General of the Society of Jesus (1983–2008).
- Jack Little, 84, American football player (Baltimore Colts).
- James E. McClellan, 90, American politician, member of the Maryland House of Delegates (1978–1994).
- Jean Moore, 83, Australian politician, member of the Tasmanian Legislative Council (1992–1994).
- David Provan, 75, Scottish footballer (Rangers).
- Chad Robinson, 36, Australian rugby league footballer (Sydney Roosters, Parramatta Eels), suicide by traffic collision.
- Debra Saunders-White, 59, American educator, Chancellor of North Carolina Central University (since 2013), kidney cancer.
- Hannelore Siegel, 75, German farmer and politician, member of the Bavarian Senate (1996–1999).
- Nils-Börje Stormbom, 91, Finnish author.
- Velko Valkanov, 88, Bulgarian politician.
- John Vanak, 83, American basketball referee.
- Charles Coster van Voorhout, 74, Dutch Olympic field hockey player.
- Fritz Weaver, 90, American actor (Fail Safe, Holocaust, Creepshow), Tony winner (1970).

=== 27 ===
- Nijolė Ambrazaitytė, 77, Lithuanian opera singer and politician.
- Joan Burke, 88, Irish politician.
- Bernard Gallagher, 87, British actor (Casualty, Crown Court, Downton Abbey).
- Valerie Gaunt, 84, British actress (The Curse of Frankenstein, Dracula).
- Jorge Luis González Tanquero, 46, Cuban dissident and prisoner of conscience.
- Ioannis Grivas, 93, Greek politician, Prime Minister (1989).
- Paul Guers, 88, French actor (Kali Yug: Goddess of Vengeance).
- Viktor Ivannikov, 76, Russian computer scientist.
- Lim Chiew Peng, 65, Singaporean footballer, cancer.
- Graham Lay, 56, British antiques expert (Antiques Roadshow), cystic fibrosis.
- Dick Logan, 86, American football player (Green Bay Packers).
- Tony Martell, 90, American music industry executive.
- Bruce Mazlish, 93, American historian.
- Thomas Pazyj, 61, Danish Olympic handball player (1976, 1980).
- Alan Preen, 81, Australian sportsman.
- S. J. Revich, 84, Canadian author.
- Stanley Reynolds, 82, American journalist.
- Wayne Smith, 66, Canadian football player (Ottawa Rough Riders, Toronto Argonauts).
- Brian Spalding, 93, British scientist.
- William Lay Thompson, 86, American ornithologist.
- Anand Yadav, 80, Indian Marathi writer.

=== 28 ===
- Dalva Allen, 81, American football player (Oakland Raiders, Houston Oilers, Toronto Argonauts).
- Bill Bell, 87–88, Canadian Olympic basketball player.
- William Christenberry, 80, American artist, Alzheimer's disease.
- Jim Delligatti, 98, American entrepreneur, creator of the Big Mac.
- Haruka Eigen, 70, Japanese professional wrestler (AJPW, NJPW) and executive (Pro Wrestling Noah), heart attack.
- Hezi Eshel, 85, Israeli military officer.
- Angus Fletcher, 86, American literary critic and scholar.
- John C. Harkness, 99, American architect.
- Adolfo Horta, 59, Cuban featherweight boxer, Olympic silver medalist (1980).
- Carlton Kitto, 74, Indian jazz guitarist.
- Georg Lhotsky, 79, Austrian actor and director (Moss on the Stones).
- Mai Yinghao, 87, Chinese archaeologist (Mausoleum of the Nanyue King), cancer.
- Ng Bi-chu, 88, Taiwanese activist, complications of diabetes.
- Lolita Rodriguez, 81, Philippine actress, heart attack.
- Bob Sayers, 99, Australian rules footballer (Fitzroy).
- Udiramala Subramaniam, 69, Indian cricketer.
- Sir John Swire, 89, British businessman (Swire Group).
- Mark Taimanov, 90, Russian Soviet-era chess grandmaster and concert pianist, USSR chess champion (1956).
- Ivar Thomassen, 62, Norwegian folk singer-songwriter.
- Grant Tinker, 90, American television executive, CEO of NBC (1981–1986).
- André Tranchemontagne, 77, Canadian politician, Member of the Quebec National Assembly for Mont-Royal (1998-2003).
- Burghild Wieczorek, 73, German Olympic athlete.
- Van Williams, 82, American actor (The Green Hornet), renal failure.
- Keo Woolford, 49, American filmmaker and actor (Hawaii Five-0, Godzilla, Act of Valor), complications from a stroke.
- Lyudmila Yurlova, 44, Russian ice hockey player, smoke inhalation.
- Notable Brazilian people killed in the crash of LaMia Flight 2933:
  - Ananias, 27, football player (Chapecoense, Portuguesa).
  - Ailton Canela, 22, football player (Chapecoense).
  - Matheus Biteco, 21, football player (Chapecoense, Grêmio).
  - Mateus Caramelo, 22, football player (Chapecoense).
  - Victorino Chermont, 43, reporter (Fox Sports).
  - Paulo Julio Clement, 51, commentator (Fox Sports).
  - José Gildeixon Clemente de Paiva, 29, football player (Chapecoense, Coritiba).
  - Marcos Danilo Padilha, 31, football player (Chapecoense).
  - Dener, 25, football player (Chapecoense).
  - Guilherme Gimenez de Souza, 21, football player (Chapecoense).
  - Lucas Gomes da Silva, 26, football player (Chapecoense).
  - Josimar, 30, football player (Chapecoense).
  - Caio Júnior, 51, football player and manager (Chapecoense, Vitória de Guimarães).
  - Everton Kempes dos Santos Gonçalves, 34, football player (Chapecoense, JEF United Chiba).
  - Filipe Machado, 32, football player (Chapecoense, CSKA Sofia).
  - Arthur Maia, 24, football player (Chapecoense, Vitória).
  - Sérgio Manoel, 27, football player (Chapecoense).
  - Marcelo Augusto Mathias da Silva, 25, football player (Chapecoense, Flamengo).
  - Delfim Peixoto, 75, politician and football executive, vice-president of CBF, president of Federação Catarinense de Futebol and congressman.
  - Mário Sérgio, 66, football player, manager, and commentator (Fox Sports).
  - Bruno Rangel, 34, football player (Chapecoense).
  - Cléber Santana, 35, football player (Chapecoense, Atlético Madrid).
  - Tiaguinho, 22, football player (Chapecoense).
  - Thiego, 30, football player (Chapecoense, Grêmio).

=== 29 ===
- Bill Barrot, 72, Australian football player (Richmond).
- Bill Bartmann, 68, American businessman, complications from heart surgery.
- Margaret Belcher, 80, New Zealand literary scholar.
- Ray Columbus, 74, New Zealand rock singer (Ray Columbus & the Invaders).
- James Danieley, 92, American educator, President of Elon University (1957–1973).
- Joe Dever, 60, British author (Lone Wolf), complications from bile duct surgery.
- Melvin Duncan, 87, American baseball player (Kansas City Monarchs, Detroit Stars).
- Duncan B. Forrester, 83, Scottish theologian.
- Max Lennon, 76, American academic administrator.
- David Loeb, 92, Canadian businessman, bladder cancer.
- Luis Alberto Monge, 90, Costa Rican politician, President (1982–1986), cardiac arrest.
- Hardy Myers, 77, American politician, Attorney General for Oregon (1997–2009), complications from pneumonia.
- Norman Oakley, 77, English footballer (Hartlepool United, Doncaster Rovers, Grimsby Town).
- Roger Parent, 63, Canadian politician, cancer.
- Claudio Pavone, 95, Italian historian.
- Börje Rendin, 95, Swedish Olympic sprinter.
- Andrew Rippin, 66, British-born Canadian Islamic historian.
- Ruta Šaca-Marjaša, 89, Latvian lawyer, writer and politician, MP (1990–1998).
- Bert Salzman, 85, American film director (Angel and Big Joe), Oscar winner (1976).
- Lana Spreeman, 61, Canadian alpine skier, Paralympic gold medalist (1980), brain cancer.
- Richard B. Teitelman, 69, American judge (Supreme Court of Missouri).
- Alexander Thieme, 62, German sprinter, Olympic silver medalist (1976).
- Allan Zavod, 71, Australian pianist, brain cancer.

=== 30 ===
- Alice Drummond, 88, American actress (Ghostbusters, Awakenings, Doubt), complications from a fall.
- Amar Ezzahi, 75, Algerian Chaabi singer.
- Michel Houel, 74, French politician, mayor of Crécy-la-Chapelle (2001–2015) and member of the Senate (since 2004).
- Kamilló Lendvay, 87, Hungarian composer and conductor.
- Leonard of Mayfair, 78, British celebrity hairdresser.
- Aleksei Maslennikov, 87, Russian tenor.
- Sigrid McCausland, 63, Australian archivist and educator, abdominal cancer.
- Peng Chang-kuei, 97, Taiwanese chef, inventor of General Tso's Chicken, pneumonia.
- Robert Thomas Seeley, 84, American mathematician.
- Sinclair Stevens, 89, Canadian politician, Leader of the Progressive Canadian Party (since 2007), heart attack.
- Lionel Stoléru, 79, French politician and conductor.
- Erdal Tosun, 53, Turkish actor (G.O.R.A., Vizontele), traffic collision.
- Royce Womble, 85, American football player (Baltimore Colts).
