= Angus Fletcher =

Angus Fletcher may refer to:

- Angus Fletcher (businessman), British businessman and Hong Kong politician
- Angus Fletcher (critic), American critic and literary scholar
