= Revich =

Revich is a surname, that may refer to

- Yury Revich, a classical violinist from Russia
- Elena Revich, a classical violinist from Russia
- S. J. Revich, an author from Canada
