= Laurent Pardo =

Background information
- Born: 16 August 1961; Rouen, Normandy, France
- Died: 5 November 2016 (aged 55)
- Genres: Rock, contemporary music
- Instrument(s): Bass, violoncello, tambourine, background vocals
- Years active: 1977-2016

Laurent Pardo (16 August 1961 – 5 November 2016) was a French bass guitarist, violoncellist, and background singer. He was best known for playing in the rock band of American singer Elliott Murphy.

== Career ==
After learning the trade and refining his technique with regional bands, Pardo joined the Paris-based US-American singer-songwriter Elliott Murphy in late 2005. As the bass player of Murphy's backing group The Normandy All Stars(the other two members being guitarist Olivier Durand and Alan Fatras on drums) he has toured large parts of Europe and, repeatedly since 2009, the east coast of the United States. He is featured on four of Murphy's studio albums and can be heard and seen on the CD/DVD-set Alive In Paris. Occasionally, Pardo reunited with former Mister Moonlight members and affiliates for concerts and recordings.

== LP- and CD-Discography ==
- 1985 "Alan Woody" with Alan Woody
- 1988 Precious Time with Mister Moonlight
- 1988 Hands (2LP) with Kid Pharaon
- 1988 Circles On Me (EP/MCD) with Kid Pharaon
- 1989 Lullaby with Mister Moonlight
- 1991 Deep Sleep with Kid Pharaon Merry Go Round
- 1994 Live June 16 with Mister Moonlight
- 1999 Prenez place dans mon bain with Gul de Boa
- 1993 Le petit monde with Fata Morgana
- 2004 The Crossing with The Jury
- 2007 Coming Home Again with Elliott Murphy
- 2008 Notes From The Underground with Elliott Murphy
- 2009 Alive In Paris (CD/DVD-set) with Elliott Murphy
- 2010 High Lonesomes with Johan Asherton
- 2010 God save the Sex Pistols (compilation) with Mister Moonlight
- 2010 Elliott Murphy with Elliott Murphy
- 2011 Just For One Day - KinkFM 2 Meter Sessie (7 track mini album) with Elliott Murphy
- 2011 Just A Story From New York with Elliott Murphy (a limited 2CD edition of this live album contains 4 bonus tracks)
- 2012 The House Of Many Doors with Johan Asherton
- 2013 It Takes A Worried Man with Elliott Murphy
- 2013 Forty Five with The Normandy All Stars
- 2014 Songs from the Kitchen, Vol. 1 (Intime) (EP = 5 track CD) with Elliott Murphy
