= Zdzisław Konieczny =

Polish historian (1930–2016)

Zdzisław Konieczny (1930 - 25 November 2016) was a Polish historian specializing in the issue of Polish-Ukrainian relations. He was a member of the Polish Historical Society. He was the director of the Municipal archive in Przemyśl from 1976 to 1996.

== Selected publications ==
- An Outline of History of Przemyśl Archive and its Resources (1874-1987), Przemyśl 1988
- Documents About Polish-Ukrainian Relationship in Resources of the State Archive in Przemyśl
- Office Apartments and Buildings of Przemyśl Archive, Przemyśl 1996
- The Diploma of Emperor Joseph II from 1789 Restoring the Local Power to Przemyśl, Przemyśl 1990
- Ukrainian Organisations in the Light of Report of the Starosts from 1939
- Resources for the History of the Peasant Movement in the State Archive in Przemyśl
- "Był taki czas. U źródeł akcji odwetowej w Pawłokomie". Przemyśl 2000. wyd. Archiwum Państwowego w Przemyślu
- Kazimierz Karol Arłamowski, Przemyśl 1982
- Influence of October Revolution over an Increase of Revolutionary Movements in Przemyśl (Lecture), Przemyśl 1977
- Tadeusz Troskolański, Przemyśl 1981
- "Walki polsko-ukraińskie w Przemyślu i okolicy listopad-grudzień 1918" - Przemyśl 1993
- "Rozwój i działalność PPR na terenie miasta i powiatu przemyskiego w latach 1944-1948" - (w:) Przemyskie Zapiski Historyczne z 1974
- Źródła do dziejów ziem województwa tarnobrzeskiego w zasobie Archiwum Państwowego w Przemyślu
- Sprawozdanie Archiwum Państwowego w Przemyślu za lata 1993–1995; Recenzje i omówienia
- Żydzi w świetle sprawozdań starostów z lat 1938–1939: [źródła]
- Zmiany demograficzne w południowo - wschodniej Polsce w latach 1939 - 1950, Przemyśl 2002
- Przywilej lokacyjny miasta Przeworska z 1393 roku, Przemyśl 1992
- Akta dotyczące stosunków polsko-ukraińskich w zasobie Archiwum Państwowego w Przemyślu;
- Zdzisław Konieczny. Okupacyjny spis ludności z 1 marca 1943 roku w 11 powiatach południowo-wschodnich dystryktów lubelskiego i krakowskiego Generalnego Gubernatorstwa
- Materiały źródłowe do dziejów ruchu ludowego w zasobie Archiwum Państwowego w Przemyślu;
- Gimnazjum i Liceum w Przeworsku w latach 1911–1991. Zarys dziejów, Przeworsk 1992
- Walki polsko - ukrainskie w Przemyślu i okolicy - listopad, grudzień 1918 r.,
