= Bob Sayers =

Australian rules footballer, born 1917

- Sayers in September 2016

Personal information
- Born: 26 October 1917; Fitzroy, Victoria, Australia
- Died: 28 November 2016 (aged 99); Blackburn, Victoria, Australia
- Original team: Fitzroy Sub Districts
- Height: 180 cm (5 ft 11 in)
- Weight: 70 kg (154 lb)

Playing career^{1}
Years	Club	Games (Goals)
1938–39	Fitzroy	4 (0)
- ^{1} Playing statistics correct to the end of 1939.

Robert Walter Henry Sayers (26 October 1917 – 28 November 2016) was an Australian rules footballer who played with Fitzroy in the Victorian Football League (VFL).

== Family ==
The son of Henry William Arthur Sayers (1888-1934), and Ruby May Sayers (1889-1971), née Rice, Robert Walter Henry Sayers was born at Fitzroy, Victoria on 26 October 1917.

He married Doreen Sarah McClure (1920–2009) on 16 March 1940. They had three children.

== Football ==
In 22 April 1938, Sayers was granted a clearance to Fitzroy from Fitzroy Sub-District.

With his First XVIII debut delayed by an injury, he played his first match for the senior side, on the wing, against Richmond at the Brunswick Street Oval on 4 June 1938. He was injured during the third quarter of the match, and was not selected on the following Saturday.

In his last First XVIII match for Fitzroy, he was 19th man, and replaced Len Smith (footballer, born 1912), who had broken his hand, at half time of the match against Hawthorn, at the Brunswick Street Oval, on 13 May 1939.

On 21 July 1939, he was cleared from Fitzroy to East Brunswick in the Sub-District Football League.

== Death ==
He died at Regis Aged Care, Blackburn, Victoria, on 28 November 2016.
