= Maria Glazovskaya =

Russian geochemist

- Мария Глазовская
- Born: 26 January 1912; Saint Petersburg, Russian Empire
- Died: 20 November 2016 (aged 104); Moscow, Russia
- Education: Saint Petersburg State University
- Scientific career
- Fields: Geography; geochemistry; landscape ecology

Maria Alfredovna Glazovskaya (Russian: Мария Альфредовна Глазовская; 26 January 1912 – 20 November 2016) was a soil scientist and agrochemist. Honorary Professor of Moscow State University, an honorary member of the Russian Geographical Society and the Dokuchaev Society of Soil Science, Professor Emeritus of the University of Warsaw, and an honorary doctor of the University of Sofia. She was vice president of the All-Union Society of Soil Scientists, a correspondent member of the International Commission for the Use of Land, and a member of the Advisory Committee of the FAO-UNESCO. M.A. Glazovskaya was one of the top Soviet experts in the FAO/UNESCO Soil Map of the World project.

== Biography ==
She was born in Saint Petersburg, the daughter of high-ranked Imperial official Alfred Graf von Keyserlingk (1861-1939) and Maria Fyedorovna Glazovskaya (1881-1963), she had younger full-sister Margarita Alfredovna (1916-1998) and three half-siblings from her father's marriage. She was of Baltic German descent.

In 1929, she graduated from high school in Kolpino at Leningrad and entered the Leningrad Agricultural Institute. A year later, she moved into the geological and soil-geographical faculty of Leningrad State University. She graduated from the university in 1934 with a specialty in soil science and left for PhD study at the Geographic and Economic Research Institute.

In 1937 she defended her thesis for the degree of candidate of geographical sciences. After the defense, she was an assistant at the Department of Soil Geography Geography Faculty of Leningrad State University. She actively participated in the expeditions of the Soil Institute Dokuchaev USSR.

From 1939 to 1952, she lived in Alma-Ata, was in charge of the sector of soil genesis of the Institute of Soil Science of Kazakhstan, and taught soil science and soil geography at the Kazakh Pedagogical Institute. In 1952, she moved to Moscow, where she defended her doctoral thesis on Inner Tien-Shan as a mountainous country in Central Asia in the same year. Since 1952, Associate Professor; since 1954 - professor, 1956-to 1959 - Head of the Department of Physical Geography of the USSR; from 1959 to 1987 - Head; and from 1987 to the present time, Assistant Professor of the Department of Geochemistry Landscape and Geography Soil Geography Faculty of Moscow State University.

At Moscow University, in the Faculty of Geography, she lectured on the following: Fundamentals of Soil Science and Soil Geography, Soils of the World, Geochemistry of Landscapes of the USSR, The Geochemical Features of Micro-organisms, Geochemistry of Natural and Man-made Landscapes of the USSR.

In December 2014, she was granted the status of Legend by the Russian Geographical Society for outstanding achievements in the field of geographical sciences, education, and the upbringing of young people.

== Awards ==
- Medal For Valiant Labour in the Great Patriotic War 1941–1945 (1945)
- Order of the Badge of Honour (1961)
- Order of the Red Banner of Labour (1971)
- Honored Scientist of the RSFSR (1978)
- Medal Veteran of Labour (1984)
- USSR State Prize (1987)
- Honorary Professor of Moscow State University (1994)

== Literature ==
- Основы почвоведения и география почв. Географгиз, М., 1960 (в соавт. с И. П. Герасимовым)
- Геохимические основы типологии и методики исследования природных ландшафтов. М., 1964
- Почвы мира, т.1. М, 1972; т.2, 1973
- Общее почвоведение и география почв. М., 1983
- Геохимия природных и техногенных ландшафтов СССР. М., 1988
- Методологические основы оценки эколого-геохимической устойчивости почв к техногенным воздействиям. М., 1997
- География почв с основами почвоведения. М., 1995; 2005 (в соавт. с А. Н. Геннадиевым)
- Педолитогенез и континентальные циклы углерода. М., 2009
- События моей жизни на фоне войн и революций ХХ века. М., 2013
