= Bill Dimock =

Canadian ice hockey player

- Born: April 7, 1923 Trail, British Columbia, Canada
- Died: November 22, 2016 (aged 93) New Glasgow, Nova Scotia, Canada
- Position: Center
- Shot: Left
- Played for: Sudbury Wolves; Verdun Rams; Alberta Golden Bears
- National team: Canada
- Playing career: 1945–1952
Medal record
Men's ice hockey
Silver medal – second place	1949 Stockholm	Ice hockey

William Richmond Dimock (April 7, 1923 – November 22, 2016) was a Canadian ice hockey player with the Sudbury Wolves. He captained the team which won the silver medal at the 1949 World Ice Hockey Championships in Stockholm, Sweden.

He also played with the Verdun Rams and Alberta Golden Bears.

He lived in Pictou County, Nova Scotia, where he was honoured by the Pictou County Sports Heritage Hall of Fame in 2014. He died in 2016.
