= You Xiaozeng =

Chinese inorganic chemist (1934–2016)

- 游效曾
- Born: January 1934; Ji'an, Jiangxi, China
- Died: 19 November 2016 (aged 82); Nanjing, Jiangsu, China
- Education: National Central University; Wuhan University
- Scientific career
- Fields: Inorganic chemistry
- Workplaces: Nanjing University

You Xiaozeng (Chinese: 游效曾; pinyin: Yóu Xiàozēng; January 1934 – 19 November 2016) was a Chinese inorganic chemist. He was an educator and an academician of the Chinese Academy of Sciences (CAS). You died on 19 November 2016 at the age of 83 in Nanjing.
