= John Ebersole (educator) =

American educator, writer, and academic administrator

John Frederick Ebersole (April 4, 1944 – November 23, 2016) was an American educator, author, columnist, and president of Excelsior College. He served as president from 2006 to 2016, succeeding C. Wayne Williams, the founding president of the college.

== Experience and education ==
Ebersole's career as an educator began at John F. Kennedy University. He eventually held positions at the University of California, Berkeley, Colorado State University, and Boston University, where he developed "BU Global". He also held a Sandler Fellowship at Harvard University's Kennedy School of Government.

Ebersole chaired the American Association of Community Colleges' Corporate Council and served on the board of directors of the Presidents' Forum. He holds a Doctor of Law and Policy degree from Northeastern University.

== Military career ==
Ebersole, a Vietnam War veteran, served in the U.S. Coast Guard from 1962 to 1983, achieving the rank of Commander (O-5) and receiving numerous military decorations, including two Bronze Stars. He held three commanding officer positions, including USCGC Cape Morgan (Charleston, South Carolina, 1968-1969), USCGC Point Grace (Cat Lo, Republic of Vietnam, 1969-1970), and, Pacific Area Training Team (Alameda, California, 1979-1981).

== Awards and recognitions ==
In 2009, Ebersole was awarded the Secretary of the Army Public Service Award. On May 6, 2014, Ebersole was inducted into the United States Distance Learning Association Hall of Fame.
