= Antonio Preto =

Italian academic and politician (1965–2016)

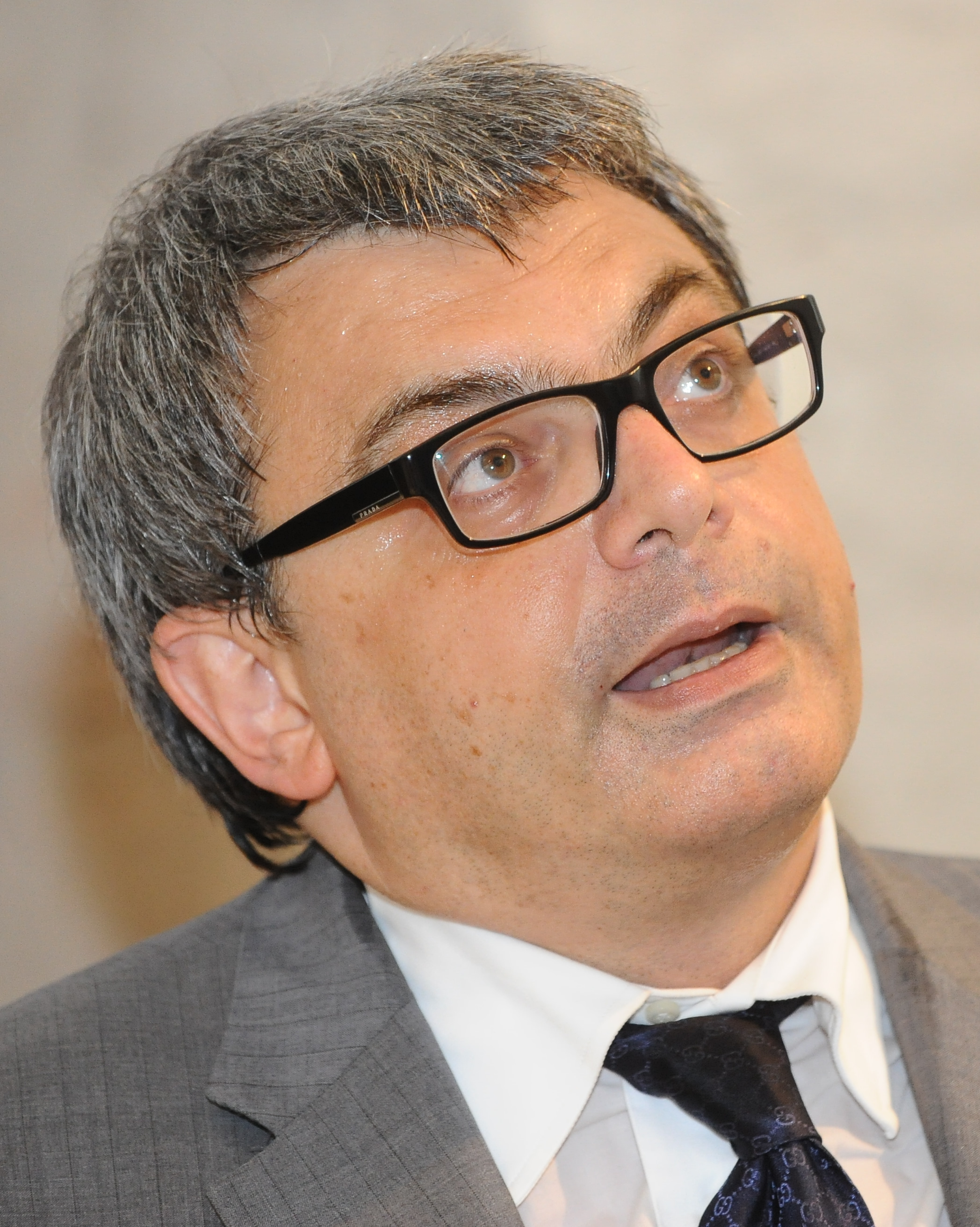

Antonio Preto (30 April 1965 – 3 November 2016) was an Italian lawyer who was a civil servant of the European Parliament and from 2012 a member of the Italian regulator for Communications and the Audiovisual sector, Commissioner for Infrastructure and Networks. During his career in Brussels he dealt in particular with regulation issues and European policies concerning the right of establishment and the freedom to provide services, competition, e-commerce, copyright in the information society, consumer protection, industry and technological innovation. He also followed privatization and takeover beats of European important firms and EU controversy. Europe has been the common thread of his career. He participated in all the major debates on European integration and the future of the European Union. He closely followed the developments of the European Convention for a Constitutional Treaty, the enlargement process, the single market, the liberalization of the professions in Italy and Europe, the debate on the economical governance and the evolution of the professions' liberalization in Italy and Europe. Moreover, he also followed the interaction between the free market and the European construction.

He frequently lectures and attends conferences in various universities in Italy and abroad i.e. Università Bocconi, Università statale di Milano and Università di Padova. He has been also temporary teacher of European Commercial Law at Università di Roma Tor Vergata and visiting professor in 2000 of EU and International Economic Law at Malaya University of Kuala Lumpur. Currently he teaches State aid and industrial policy and from 2015 he is temporary Professor of International Commercial Law at School of Economics, Management and Statistics, Università di Bologna.

Antonio Preto authored a number of books on the European Union as well as articles and lectures published on a number of journals such as Rivista Italiana di Diritto Pubblico Comunitario, Diritto Pubblico Comparato ed Europeo, Contratto e Impresa/Europa, Il Sole 24 Ore e Il Riformista.

In 2000 he received two prestigious literary prizes for the publication "Il Nord-Est in Europa. Le nuove sfide di un successo storico" (Marsilio, 2009).

== Studies and legal career ==
Preto was born in Valdagno attended the local "Liceo Classico Giangiorgio di Trissino" and graduated in Law from the University of Bologna in 1988.

He was called to the Italian bar in 1992 and from 2002 to 2003 he acted as a consultant to the Italian ministry of justice on the question of reforming the liberal professions.

== Political activism ==
Politics has always been a part of Antonio Preto's life, starting in High School when he was returned as student representative for 5 consecutive years. In 1983 he joins the Democrazia Cristiana and in those first years he is appointed Regional Vice-Delegate for the DC youth of the Veneto region.

In 1990, he is elected to the Valdagno city council where he heads the Democrazia Cristiana group. During this experience he has also served on Valdagno's executive charged with developing culture and school in the city.

== Career in the European Institutions ==
Antonio Preto starts his career in the European institutions in 1992 when he relocates to Brussels. From 1992 through to 2007 he works in the European Parliament for the EPP group. From 1992 to 1994 he is the EPP official charged with following the Agriculture Committee. From 1994 to 2007 he is the EPP official in charge of the Legal Affairs and Internal Market Committee. Throughout this time he was also advising the presidents of the Committee Carlo Casini, Ana Palacio and Giuseppe Gargani.

Following this experience – and before his arrival at the European Commission – he served in the cabinet of the President of the European Parliament Hans Gert Pöttering as Team Leader charged with internal matters of the Union and adviser to the President for legislative and legal affairs.

From 2008 to 2009 he is the Head of Cabinet to Antonio Tajani, Vice-President of the European Commission charged with the transport portfolio within the Barroso I Commission. In this role he helped develop the strategic vision for a European Transport policy as well as organizing and managing the cabinet, relations with the relevant Directorates-general and the spokespeople.

From February 2010 to February 2012 he is the Head of Cabinet to Antonio Tajani, Vice-President of the European Commission charged with the industry and entrepreneurship portfolio in the Barroso II Commission. He manages the cabinet and is responsible for institutional affairs.

From March to July 2012 he is the Adviser to the Secretary General of the European Parliament Klaus Welle.

During his career he cooperated with the former Minister for Public Administration and Innovation Renato Brunetta, with whom he wrote several publications.

On 6 June 2012 he has been elected Commissioner of Agcom by the Italian Senate (94 votes).

== Writings ==
- Antonio Preto, In principio è la rete, Marsilio, 2014.
- Antonio Preto, L'Europa che vorrei, Rubbettino, 2006.
- Antonio Preto, Renato Brunetta, Quindici più dieci. Il difficile cammino dell'integrazione europea, Marsilio 2004.
- Antonio Preto, Le libere professioni in Europa. Regole e concorrenza per il mercato globale, EGEA 2001.
- Antonio Preto, Il Nordest in Europa. Le nuove sfide di un successo storico, Marsilio 1999.
