= William Lay Thompson =

American ornithologist, naturalist and educator (1930–2016)

- Born: William Lay Thompson; February 16, 1930; Austin, Texas, U.S.
- Died: November 27, 2016 (aged 86); Livonia, Michigan, U.S.
- Education: University of Texas at Austin; University of California, Berkeley
- Scientific career
- Fields: Biology
- Workplaces: Wayne State University

William Lay Thompson (1930-2016) was an American ornithologist, naturalist and educator. He was Professor Emeritus of Biological Sciences at Wayne State University, an expert on bird vocalizations, past President of the Michigan Audubon Society, and past editor of the Jack Pine Warbler.

== Early life and education ==
Thompson was born on February 16, 1930, in Austin, Texas. He was the son of Dora (née Lay) Thompson of Lockhart, Texas and William Henry Thompson of Brownwood, Texas. He attended the Austin public schools. After graduating from Austin High School he went to the University of Texas at Austin where he received his bachelor's degree with a major in zoology and a minor in botany. He continued at the University of Texas for a master's degree in zoology. This was followed by a doctorate in zoology at the University of California, Berkeley.

== Career ==
From 1955 to 1957, Thompson served in the United States Army Chemical Corps, stationed in Washington D.C.

In 1959, Thompson was engaged to teach at Wayne State University, in Detroit, Michigan, in the Department of Biology. He also taught in the university's adult education program and at the Detroit Zoo.

As of 1962, Thompson was researching the behavior of the indigo bunting in Michigan as part of a three-year study funded by the National Science Foundation. His research focused on differences between the indigo bunting and two related species, the lazuli bunting and the painted bunting.

He was elected as a member of the American Ornithologists' Union and as a Fellow of the American Association for the Advancement of Science. He retired from Wayne State in 1993 as professor emeritus.

Thompson established Museum of Natural History in the Biology Department at Wayne State University circa 1972-1976 was used by area schools in "Tandem Teaching" program.

Thompson was a member of the Detroit Audubon Society, in which he served a term as vice president and also the Michigan Audubon Society, in which he served as president for several years.

== Personal life ==
In 1958 Thompson married Retta Catherine Maninger in Berkeley, California. They had three children.

== Death ==
Thompson died on November 27, 2016, in Livonia, Michigan.

== Selected publications ==
- Thompson, William L. (July 1960). "Agonistic Behavior in the House Finch. Part I: Annual Cycle and Display Patterns". The Condor. 62 (4): 245–271. doi:10.2307/1365516.
- ——— (September 1960). "Agonistic Behavior in the House Finch. Part II: Factors in Aggressiveness and Sociality". The Condor. 62 (5): 378–402. doi:10.2307/1365167.
- Rice, John O'Hara; ——— (November 1968). "Song development in the indigo bunting". Animal Behaviour. 16 (4): 462–469. doi:10.1016/0003-3472(68)90041-9.
- ——— (November 1969). "Song recognition by territorial male buntings (Passerin A)". Animal Behaviour. 17 (4): 658–663. doi:10.1016/s0003-3472(69)80008-4.
- ———; Rice, John O'Hara (January 12, 1970). "Calls of the Indigo Bunting, Passerina cyanea 1". Zeitschrift für Tierpsychologie. 27 (1): 35–46. doi:10.1111/j.1439-0310.1970.tb01859.x.
- ——— (January 1970). "Song Variation in a Population of Indigo Buntings". The Auk. 87 (1): 58–71. doi:10.2307/4083658.
- ———, ed. (1973). Enjoying birds in Michigan : a guide and resource book for finding, attracting and studying birds in Michigan (3rd ed.). Kalamazoo: Michigan Audubon Society.
- Payne, Robert B.; ———; Fiala, Kent L.; Sweany, Laura L. (1981). "Local Song Traditions in Indigo Buntings: Cultural Transmission of Behavior Patterns Across Generations". Behaviour. 77 (4): 199–221. doi:10.1163/156853981X00383.
