= Nijolė Ambrazaitytė =

Lithuanian politician

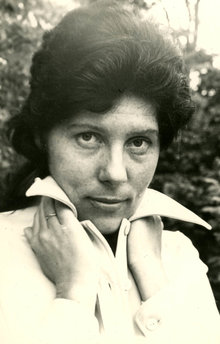
- Ambrazaitytė in 1970

Background information
- Born: February 21, 1939; Burokai, Kalvarija Municipality, Lithuania
- Died: November 27, 2016 (aged 77) Vilnius, Lithuania
- Occupations: Opera singer, politician

Nijolė Ambrazaitytė (21 February 1939 – 27 November 2016) was an opera singer, politician, and signatory of the 1990 Act of the Re-Establishment of the State of Lithuania.

== Biography ==
Ambrazaitytė was born in Burokai, Kalvarija Municipality, Lithuania. Ambrazaitytė's parents moved to Germany during World War II and later to Canada. She was brought up by her grandparents in a village in the Raseiniai district. She was deported to Siberia in 1948, returning in 1956 to study at the Lithuanian State Conservatoire. Her career as a singer began in 1966. She has released about 30 recordings and has performed in various international opera houses. Ambrazaitytė, elected to the Supreme Council of Lithuania in 1990, the Seimas in 1992 and the Seventh Seimas in 1996 has also served as a member of the Commission on State Pensions.

In 1996, she received the Order of the Lithuanian Grand Duke Gediminas, third class.

Ambrazaitytė died on 27 November 2016.
