= Richard Gigger Jr. =

American band director (1929–2016)

- Born: July 6, 1929; East St. Louis, Illinois, U.S.
- Died: November 13, 2016 (aged 87); Los Angeles, California, U.S.
- Occupation: Band director

Richard Gigger Jr. (July 6, 1929 – November 13, 2016) was an American band director, musician, educator and United States Army senior non-commissioned officer whose band and drill teams hold the record for the most victories—thirteen, eleven of which were consecutive—in the Los Angeles Unified School District Annual Band and Drill Team Championships from 1987 to 1999. Gigger was renowned for his devotion to all aspects of his students' lives, including that they continue on to college. Many have gone on to positions of prominence in education and civic leadership and credit him with inspiring them to achieve and excel.

== Biography ==
Richard Gigger Jr. was born on July 6, 1929, in East St. Louis, Illinois. In 1946 at the age of 16 he enlisted in the United States Army and was sent overseas to Europe. Though without musical background, he started to learn the saxophone and became so interested in music that a few months later, when the Army announced a need for bandsmen, he requested transfer and was sent to the U.S. Army Band School in Munich. There he was taught clarinet and saxophone. Subsequently, he was sent for further musical study to Dachau, the site of a former concentration camp, where he was given courses in clarinet and as bandsmen and bandmaster.

In 1953 Sgt. Gigger was stationed at Fort Irwin National Training Center in California as bandleader of the 433rd Army Band. While there he participated in several U.S. Army above-ground nuclear tests, including Desert Rock Exercises held at the Nevada Test Site in 1955. These tests were “designed to familiarize military personnel with the effects of atomic weapons". Soldiers were placed in various locations during the explosions, and bands were there to play music. Soldiers witnessing the explosion were not provided with protective equipment. “After [the band] finished playing, they were told to get into a trench behind them, bend down and cover their eyes.” Only posthumously, more than a half-century later, was his widow awarded compensation for fatal radiation injuries he suffered as an Atomic veteran.

In 1955 Gigger served at Fort Dix where he was a member of the Fort Dix TV Band, which had been formed for weekly TV performances. The band appeared on WFIL-TV Philadelphia, the Army's weekly "GET SET GO" show and on The Ed Sullivan Show. Gigger then returned to Germany in 1957 and toured with the 84th Army band in their public relations jazz tour program.

In 1962 Gigger assumed duties as bandleader of the 389th Army Band at Fort Monmouth as a Sergeant First Class. From 1962 to 1965 he served with Army bands in Korea, Japan, and on Governors Island, New York These bands performed at official functions including for the Emperor of Japan, ticker-tape parades in Manhattan, New York, and returning astronauts. In 1968 he retired from the Army as a Master sergeant. Gigger received undergraduate and master's degrees in music focusing on education. When he arrived at San Fernando High School in 1982 there were only six students in the band. Gigger built up the program to include three band classes and led the marching band and drill team to 11 consecutive city championships, a record 13 championships overall. Gigger and his wife Ellen, who led the Drill Team, were known for taking care of student needs, from providing meals to counseling on academic and personal issues to ensuring members of the band went on to college. Gigger and his wife were known to "hand out their phone number at the beginning of the term so that students can get in touch with them any time, day or night."

Many of Gigger's students followed in their teacher's footsteps and went on to careers in education. Others became band directors and school principals. Others are civic leaders including members of the Los Angeles City Council and California state government. Many credit Gigger for setting them on the right course and inspiring them to succeed.

Gigger retired from teaching in 1999, having affected the lives of hundreds of students and their families, including 10 of the 11 children of one Los Angeles family, the Perez's. Despite Gigger having retired years earlier, his lasting influence was such that former students arranged for the San Fernando High School music building to be named in his honor as well as a nearby intersection to be known as "Gigger Square". On the wall of the music building a 55-foot-long mural was painted depicts a banner for each of his 13 championships, along with band members, a roaring tiger and "Gig", as Gigger was known to his students, in his tiger robe.

In her 2017 motion designating the intersection of Laurel Canyon Boulevard and Chamberlain Street as Gigger Square, Los Angeles Councilwoman Monica Rodriguez, a 1992 San Fernando graduate, wrote that the Giggers “wholeheartedly devoted themselves to their students, holding them high expectations and encouraging them to strive for greatness."

At the dedication ceremony for the music building to be named in his honor, former students noted that the "tribute was greatly deserved. Mr. and Mrs. Gigger were a true inspiration for all the Tigers," "To many students they were mentors and sometimes even parental figures. They devoted themselves to their students wholeheartedly and made their students strive for greatness.”

Richard Gigger died on November 13, 2016, from complications of intentional exposure to radiation while serving in the United States Army.

== Recognition ==
Richard Gigger Jr. was accorded many honors during his life including:

- The music building at San Fernando High School where Gigger taught was named the Gigger Building in his honor.
- An intersection in Pacoima, CA adjacent to San Fernando High School was designated Gigger Square to honor Richard Gigger and his widow Ellen.
- He is the recipient of:
  - Certificate of Special Congressional Recognition from the U.S. House of Representatives
  - Two Citations in Celebration of Richard Gigger and his wife Ellen by the Los Angeles Unified School District
  - Certification of Appreciation for Dedicated Service to the Los Angeles Unified School District
  - Certificate of Commendation from the County Of Los Angeles
  - Certificate of Commendation from the City of Los Angeles
  - Certificate of Honor from the City of San Fernando
  - Certificate of Appreciation from United Teachers Los Angeles
  - Certificate of Recognition from the California State Assembly
  - Certificate of Recognition from the California State Senate
  - U.S. Army Commendation Medal, thrice awarded
  - U.S. Army Good Conduct Medal, twice awarded
  - U.S. Army Meritorious Unit Commendation
