= Sigrid McCausland =

Archivist, active in Australia, lived 1953–2016

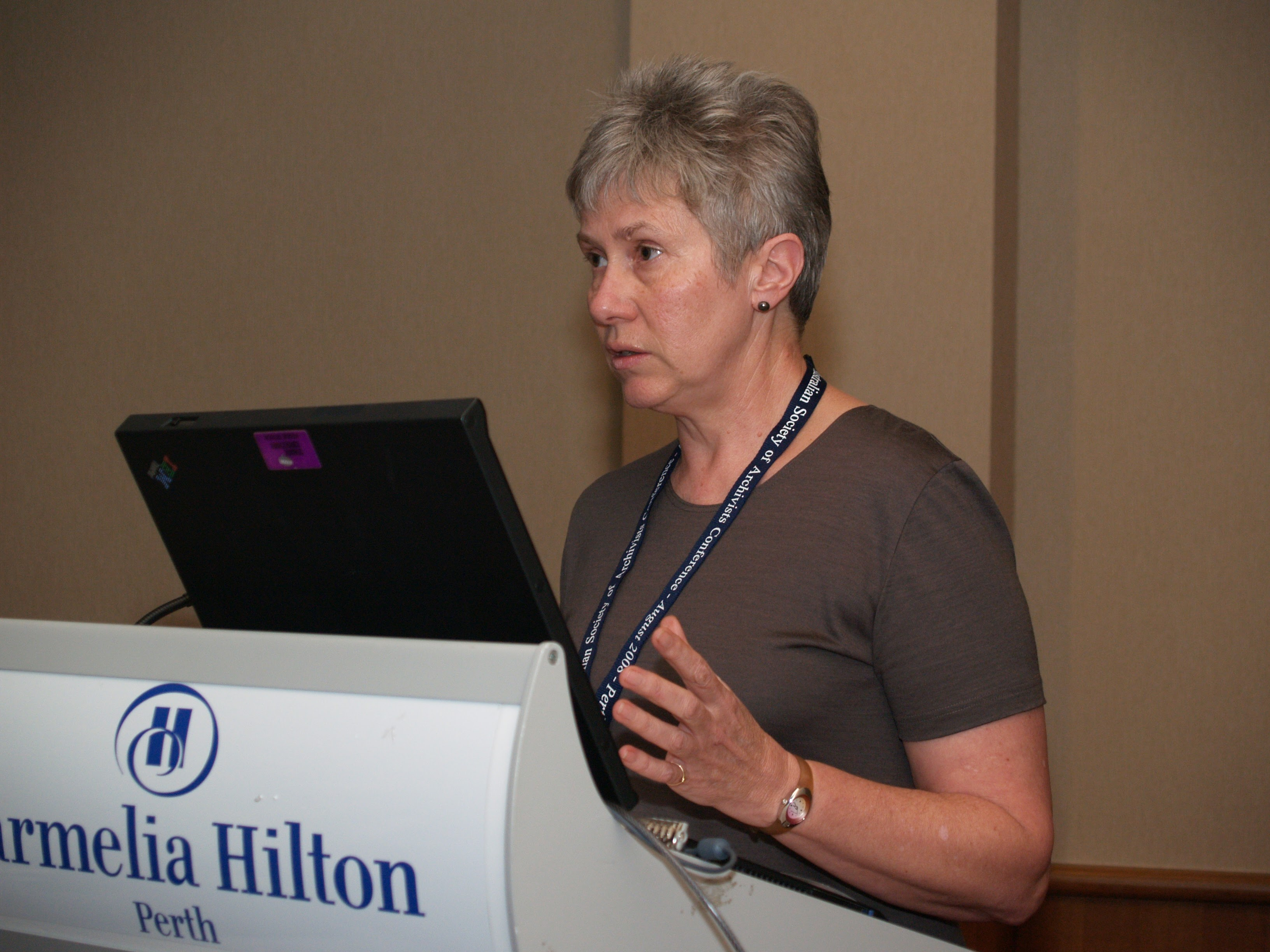
- Born: 1953; United Kingdom
- Died: November 30, 2016 (aged 63)
- Citizenship: Australian
- Occupation(s): Archivist, educator

Sigrid Kristina McCausland (1953 – 30 November 2016) was an Australian archivist and educator. Her career encompassed a variety of roles in archival practice, education, and leadership.

== Early life and education ==
Sigrid McCausland was born in England in 1953 and grew up in Bathurst, New South Wales. She completed an Honours degree at the Australian National University (ANU) from 1971 to 1974. Her thesis focused on the history of modern painting in Sydney between 1935 and 1945. During her time at ANU, she worked as a research assistant for historian Manning Clark.

McCausland traveled overseas before returning to Canberra and securing work as a public servant. In May 1978 she was recruited by Australian Archives, where she had previously worked on two occasions during her student years. She gained experience in reference services and arrangement and description.

== Career ==
From 1984 to 1986, McCausland worked in the Manuscripts Section of the Mitchell Library at the State Library of New South Wales. In 1988, she became city archivist for the City of Sydney, a role she held for four years. She served as University Archivist at the University of Technology Sydney (1991–1997) and later at ANU (1998–2005). At ANU, she played a pivotal role in the ultimately successful effort to prevent the closure of the Noel Butlin Archives Centre.

From 2009 until her death, McCausland was senior lecturer in archival science at Charles Sturt University (CSU), where she developed master’s and bachelor’s programs in archives and records management. She also served as the Australian Society of Archivists (ASA) education officer and was chair of the ASA's Accreditation/Course Recognition Committee.

From 2012 to 2016, she served as secretary general of the International Council on Archives Section on Archival Education (ICA SAE) and was active in the Archival Education and Research Initiative (AERI). Additionally, McCausland worked part-time with the Queensland Department of Aboriginal, Torres Strait Islander and Multicultural Affairs, helping members of the Stolen Generations reconnect with their families through archival records.

== Death and legacy ==
McCausland died on 30 November 2016 from a form of abdominal cancer. She was survived by her partner, historian Phil Griffiths. The Sigrid McCausland Emerging Writers Award was established by the Australian Society of Archivists to honour emerging writers in archival literature. Her final publication, on archival public programming, appeared posthumously in the second edition of Currents of Archival Thinking, which was dedicated to her memory.
