= Konrad Glas =

German sailor

Konrad Glas (21 January 1940 – 20 November 2016) was a German sailor who competed in the 1972 Summer Olympics.
