= Sutan Bhatoegana =

Indonesian politician

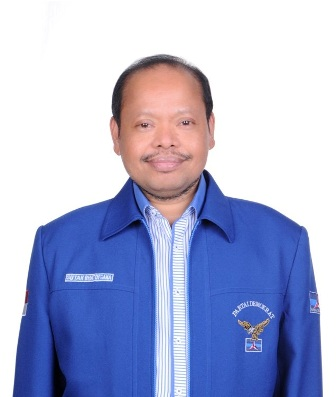
Sutan Bhatoegana

Sutan Bhatoegana Siregar (13 September 1957 – 19 November 2016) was an Indonesian politician of the Democratic Party. Sutan was a member of the People's Representative Council Commission VII of the Republic of Indonesia (DPR-RI) for the period 2009-2014 were selected from the 2009 legislative elections from the first North Sumatra constituency (electoral district) that includes Medan, Deli Serdang, Serdang Badagai, and Tebing Tinggi by the Democratic Party. Sutan was one of the founders of the Democratic Party, he was recorded as a founder and secretary of the Communication Forum Deklarator (FKPD) Democratic Party, although it is considered the unofficial forum by internal Democratic Party.
