= Jerzy Cynk =

Polish-british historian

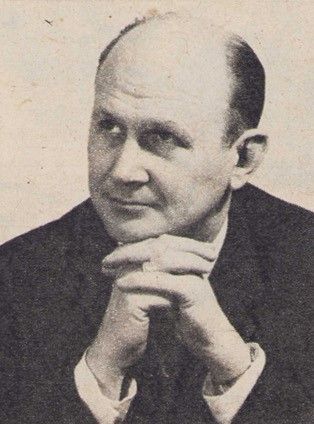

Jerzy Bogdan Cynk (11 May 1925 – 18 November 2016) was a Polish-British historian, journalist and writer, author of numerous English and Polish language publications on aviation of Poland.

During World War II he was a soldier of the Szare Szeregi and the Home Army. Arrested by the Gestapo in 1943, he was imprisoned in the infamous Pawiak prison and then sent to Auschwitz concentration camp. Transferred to Sachsenhausen-Oranienburg he was liberated by American forces on 3 May 1945. In September of that year he joined the Polish II Corps and briefly served in counter-intelligence in Northern Italy. In 1947 he moved to Bodney in the United Kingdom and then settled in London. Working for various BOC branches, he devoted most of his spare time to studies on Polish aviation history, notably the history of Polish armed forces during World War II.

Since 1953 he started publishing articles in Flight and numerous other journals, including L'Fanatique de l'Aviation, Aerospace Historian, Air Power, Skrzydła and Air Progress. He also authored Poland-related chapters of Jane's All the World's Aircraft (1953/54 and 1963/64 editions). After 1956 his articles started to be published also in Poland, notably in Skrzydlata Polska. He also collaborated regularly with the Polish Section of BBC and the Radio Free Europe.

Apart from being a co-author of several aviation encyclopaedias (including Combat Aircraft of the World and The Lore of Flight), he authored and published numerous books on Polish civil and military aviation, as well as Polish aeroplanes.
