= Steve Wing =

American university professor and activist

Steve Wing (1952–2016) was an American university professor and activist.

Wing was born in New Orleans, Louisiana. His family moved to North Carolina when he was a child and he spent most of his life there.

Wing completed his undergraduate studies at Vassar College in New York. He earned a master's degree from Duke University and then a doctorate in epidemiology from the University of North Carolina at Chapel Hill. He joined the faculty of UNC-Chapel Hill in 1985. He was an associate professor in the university's department of epidemiology.

Wing authored a seminal paper on radiation exposure and cancer among workers at Oak Ridge National Laboratory. Researching the health effects of the nuclear industry became a defining feature of his career thereafter. Wing carried out research at several United States Department of Energy facilities. He was also commissioned to conduct a critical review of prior research on the famous accident at Three Mile Island. Wing's research was an important impetus for establishing compensation programs for workers injured in the production of nuclear weapons.

With his coauthors David B. Richardson and Wolfgang Hoffmann, Wing showed that a number of cancer studies carried out around nuclear facilities had been conducted under the assumption that exposure is too low to cause an effect.

Wing was also an activist. He became involved with Concerned Citizens of Tillery in the 1990s. This in turn drew him into the North Carolina Environmental Justice Network and the Environmental Justice Summit.

Wing died from cancer in November 2016.
