= Leon C. Standifer =

American novelist

- Born: Leon Midas Calmet Standifer, Jr. April 24, 1925; Gulfport, Mississippi, U.S.
- Died: November 8, 2016 (aged 91)
- Education: Mississippi State University (BS, MS); University of Wisconsin (PhD)
- Occupations: Novelist; soldier; professor
- Spouse: Marie Scott (d. 2006)
- Children: W. Scott; Elizabeth Moore

Leon Midas Calmet Standifer Jr. (April 24, 1925 - November 8, 2016) was an American soldier, novelist, and professor. He was the son of Leonidas Calmet and Emma (Moore) Standifer. He served in the U.S. Army in World War II as a scout in the infantry from 1943 to 1946 and he received Combat Infantryman Badge and the Purple Heart. On August 17, 1957, he married Marie Scott, who is an archeobotanist. He received his education at Mississippi State University, (B.S. and M.S.) and the University of Wisconsin (now University of Wisconsin–Madison), where he received a Ph.D. in 1959. He taught at Louisiana State University as a professor of horticulture from 1961 to 1990 (professor emeritus, 1990).

== Works ==
- Not in Vain: A Rifleman Remembers World War II (1992), memoir
- Binding up the Wounds: An American Soldier in Occupied Germany, 1945-1946 (1997), memoir
- Gardening in the Humid South (2002), with Edmund N. O'Rourke
