= W. Eugene Hansen =

American religious leader

First Quorum of the Seventy
- April 1, 1989 – October 3, 1998
- Called by: Ezra Taft Benson
- End reason: Granted general authority emeritus status

Presidency of the Seventy
- August 15, 1993 – August 15, 1998
- Called by: Ezra Taft Benson
- End reason: Honorably released

Emeritus General Authority
- October 3, 1998 – November 5, 2016
- Called by: Gordon B. Hinckley

Personal details
- Born: Warren Eugene Hansen; August 23, 1928; Tremonton, Utah, United States
- Died: November 5, 2016 (aged 88); Salt Lake City, Utah

Warren Eugene Hansen (August 23, 1928 – November 5, 2016) was a general authority of the Church of Jesus Christ of Latter-day Saints (LDS Church) from 1989 until his death. He became a member of the First Quorum of the Seventy in 1989 and was a member of the Presidency of the Seventy from 1993 to 1998.

Born in Tremonton, Utah, Hansen grew up on a family farm in the vicinity of East Garland, Utah. After graduating from Utah State University, he studied law at the University of Utah and later was called into active military service. He was sent to Fort Lee, Virginia, and served a year on active duty in South Korea from 1954 to 1955. He completed his study of law at the University of Utah in 1958 and entered private law practice. From 1979 to 1980 Hansen was president of the Utah Bar Association. Other achievements include reaching the rank of colonel in the military reserve.

Among his assignments as a general authority, Hansen served in the presidency of the Asia Area during the time the building of the Hong Kong China Temple began. As a member of the Presidency of the Seventy, he served as executive director of the church's Temple Department. Prior to becoming a general authority, Hansen served as president of the Salt Lake Bonneville Stake. He died on November 5, 2016, in Salt Lake City at the age of 88.
