= Francesco Parisi (politician) =

Italian politician (1930–2016)

Francesco "Ciccio" Parisi (6 September 1930 – 18 November 2016) was an Italian Christian Democracy politician.

Born in Caltagirone, graduated in business economics, between 1987 and 1996 Parisi served two terms as a senator and one term in the Chamber of Deputies. He also served as a regional and municipal councilor.
