= John T. Skelly =

Journalist on Latin American affairs (1927–2016)

John T. “Jack” Skelly (June 1, 1927 – November 8, 2016) was a journalist who wrote for a number of news organizations, focusing primarily on Latin America. He served for a brief period in 1959 as Fidel Castro’s international press coordinator.

== Early life ==
Jack Skelly was born to American parents of Irish descent in the Dominican Republic. The family moved to Cuba a year later where his father, George Martin Skelly, was head of the railroad department for the United Fruit Company. He spent his formative years in the town of Banes, where Castro’s first wife, Mirta Díaz-Balart, was a neighbor, close childhood friend, and later a mutual teenage crush.

Skelly attended high school at Mount Saint Joseph High School in Baltimore, Maryland, followed by a two-year stint the United States Army in which he was stationed in Austria and Germany. He then attended George Washington University, where he obtained a degree in journalism.

== Journalistic career ==
Skelly was in Cuba on assignment for United Press when the Batista regime collapsed and Fidel Castro came to power in January, 1959. He was at the home of the Castro's then ex-wife watching on television as Castro rode into Havana on a Sherman tank. He recalled Díaz-Balart telling him, “If he’s as good a leader as he was a father and husband, poor Cuba.”

Castro was unprepared to handle the glare of the international media spotlight. He noticed Skelly, whom he had met ten years earlier through Díaz-Balart, in the incomprehensible scrum of English-speaking reporters and requested his help. Skelly assisted with translations and subsequently resigned his position at United Press to handle international press relations for Castro. He was at Castro's side for his January 11, 1959, appearance on Face the Nation from Havana, quietly translating some of the questions and answers, which Castro provided in struggling English. Skelly, initially hopeful that the new government would usher in an era of democratic reforms, quickly grew disillusioned with course the revolution had taken and left the island permanently, becoming a harsh critic of the Castro regime.

== Later life ==
Skelly served as an advisor and speech writer for 13 U.S. Republican and Democrat presidents.

At various times during his career, Skelly was a correspondent for the now defunct Washington Star, a publicist for the Pan-American Coffee Bureau, and a special assistant to two Secretaries General of the Organization of American States. He was also Washington Bureau Chief for Puerto Rico’s largest newspaper, El Nuevo Dia. He died on November 8, 2016 in Fort Lauderdale, Florida, just seventeen days before Castro would die himself.

== Personal life ==
He married Lucy Alexander Freeman in 1953, with whom he was to father seven children: Annee Hayden Skelly Reed Rhodes Martin, John Thomas Skelly Jr, Elizabeth "Beth" Skelly Borgman, Patricia "Patti" Mary Skelly Grove, Christopher Martin Skelly, Lucy "Rita" Alexander Skelly Maranda Brown, and Louis Joseph Skelly (Feb 16, 1961 – June 10, 1991).

He was also the grandfather of Andrew Howard Weilgus, Thor Daniel Grove, Patrick Ransom Borgman, Jessee Maranda, Benjamin Reed, Eric Steven Grove, Douglas James "Jamee" Borgman, Marguerite Colleen Borgman Allen, Louie Jackson Maranda Brown, and the great grandfather of Lilly Reed, Hayden Reed, Liam Maranda, Trevor Maranda, Ava Rose Weilgus, Connor James Borgman, Mason Alexander Borgman, and Dagne Grove.

He referred to himself as an “American Cuban,” or one of the more generic “bamboo Americans”, children born of American parents who grew up in Latin America.
