= Murray Jack =

New Zealand cricketer

Personal information
- Full name: Murray William Jack
- Born: 21 July 1932; Timaru, New Zealand
- Died: 26 November 2016 (aged 84); Timaru, New Zealand
- Batting: Left-handed
- Bowling: Slow left-arm orthodox
- Role: Bowler
- Source: Cricinfo, 17 October 2020

Murray William Jack (21 July 1932 – 26 November 2016) was a New Zealand cricketer. He played in four first-class matches for Canterbury from 1955 to 1958.
