= MaDonna Grimes =

American choreographer

- Born: 21 August 1962; Knoxville, Tennessee, U.S.
- Died: 4 November 2016 (aged 54); Hollywood, California, U.S.

MaDonna Grimes was an American choreographer and personal trainer who became well known for her workout videos in the late 1990s and early 2000s. In the mid-1980s Grimes began teaching a class called "Cardio Hip Hop" in New York City. Although hip hop dance dates back to the 1970s, Grimes has been celebrated as a pioneer for her work presenting hip hop dance in a fitness context as opposed to a performance context.

== History ==
MaDonna Grimes worked as a fitness instructor in Manhattan in the 1980s. Grimes' life and career has been discussed in the sociology of health by scholars such as Eric J. Bailey who published the following in 2008:

MaDonna Grimes offers African American women a different ideal to work toward—one suited for their unique physiques. Drawing from her experience as a professional dancer, choreographer, fitness competitor, and winner of Miss Fitness America and Miss Fitness International competitions, Grimes has fashioned a fitness program specifically for African American women, to help them attain their fitness goals and build self-esteem.

— Eric J. Bailey

Bailey argued further that Grimes' publication "Work It Out is one of the first health and fitness books designed specifically for African American women by an African American woman fitness expert."

Grimes died on 4 November 2016.

== See also ==
- History of hip hop dance
