= Tayssir Akla =

- Born: c. 1939; Syria
- Died: November 22, 2016 (aged 76–77); Brussels, Belgium
- Occupation: Composer
- Spouse: Nadia Kerbache

Tayssir Akla (c. 1939 – 2016) was a Syrian-born, Algerian-based composer.

== Early life ==
Tayssir Akla was born in Syria circa 1939. He emigrated to Algeria in 1962.

== Career ==
Akla conducted the orchestra of the Algerian Radio in 1970. He composed songs about the Algerian War, including Ana el Djazair and Thawrat al ahrar, performed by Saliha Essaghira.

== Personal life and death ==
Akla married Nadia Kerbache, an Algerian singer of Syrian descent. He became a widow when she died in 2010. Akla died six years later, on November 22, 2016, in Brussels, Belgium. Upon his death, Azzedine Mihoubi, the Algerian Minister of Culture, called him a "big composer adopted by Algeria".
