= Kaylin Andres =

American writer, artist, and fashion designer (1985–2016)

- Born: Kaylin Marie Andres; May 28, 1985; Sacramento, California
- Died: November 21, 2016 (aged 31); Manhattan, New York City

Kaylin Marie Andres (May 28, 1985 – November 21, 2016) was an American writer, artist, and fashion designer.

== Biography ==
She was born on May 28, 1985, in Sacramento, California. She graduated from El Camino Fundamental High School in 2003. When Andres was 23 years old, in 2008, she was diagnosed with Ewing's sarcoma. She was in her senior year at the California College of the Arts where she was studying fashion.

While she was in treatment, she wrote about her experience in a blog called Cancer Is Not Funny. For Andres, writing about what she was going through and using humor helped her cope with the experience. Her experiences as a young adult with cancer were chronicled in season two of the MTV series, World of Jenks, and in the comic book, Terminally Illin, published by Last Gasp.

As a fashion designer in New York City, Andres worked with Betsey Johnson and Rachel Antonoff. She lived with Melissa Carroll, a painter who also had Ewing's sarcoma. The pair met during cancer treatment. On March 31, 2014, Carroll died after a three-year battle with the disease.

In 2014, Andres exhibited art at Jenn Singer Gallery in Manhattan, New York City, that related to her fight with cancer. "Chemosynthesis" (2014) dealt with the grief of losing her health and accepting her cancer. Two years later, "Viaticum" (2016) also dealt with this acceptance. The work was inspired by a spiritual pilgrimage, in which Andres met Joao de Deus, a faith healer, in Brazil. Through the exhibition, Andres explored the connection between art and birth, as well as the physical and spiritual realms. The works in "Viaticum" are self-portrait photographs printed on silk.

Andres died on November 21, 2016, in Manhattan, New York City, after an eight-year battle with cancer. She was thirty-one years old. Andres is buried in Sacramento, California.
