= Pascal Posado =

French politician

- Born: 14 May 1925; Marseille, France
- Died: 11 November 2016 (aged 91); Marseille, France
- Occupation: Politician
- Political party: French Communist Party

Pascal Posado (14 May 1925 – 11 November 2016) was a French politician. He served as a Communist member of the National Assembly in 1978, representing Bouches-du-Rhône.

== Early life ==
Pascal Posado was born on 14 May 1925 in Marseille, France. His parents were immigrants from Spain.

== Career ==
Posado started his career as an apprentice for the SNCASE at the age of 15. Meanwhile, he joined the General Confederation of Labour and destroyed Messerschmitt aircraft made by the SNCASE.

Posado joined the French Communist Party in 1944. He served as a Communist member of the National Assembly from 15 January 1978 to 2 April 1978, representing Bouches-du-Rhône. He also served on the city council of Marseille from 1965 to 1983, and as the mayor of the 15th and 16th arrondissements of Marseille from 1983 to 1989. He then served on the city council of Marseille again from 1989 to 1995.

== Death ==
Posado died on 11 November 2016 in Marseille.

== Works ==
- Lorenzi, Léo; Posado, Pascal (1995). 1938-1945, les communistes face à la tourmente dans les Bouches-du-Rhône. Marseille: Fédération des Bouches-du-Rhône du P.C.F. OCLC 41922391.
