= Likhit Dhiravegin =

Thai political scientist and politician

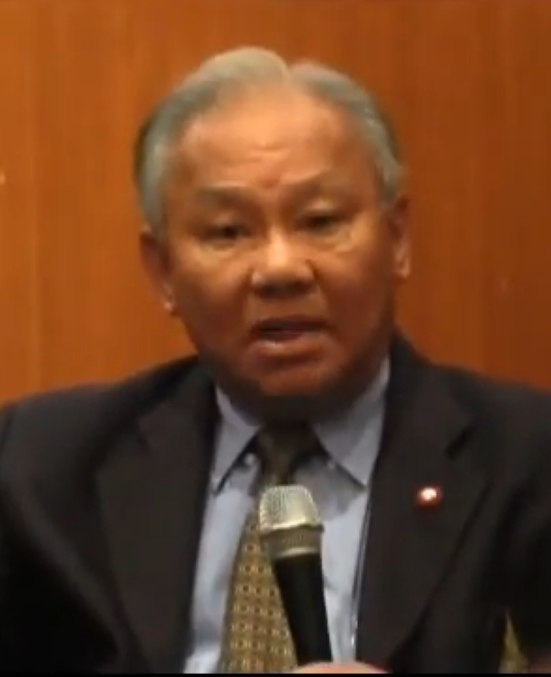

Likhit Dhiravegin (Thai: ลิขิต ธีรเวคิน, RTGS: Likhit Thirawekhin; 11 May 1941 – 20 November 2016) was a Thai political scientist and politician.
