= Graham Lay =

British antiques expert (1960-2016)

Graham Charles Lay
- Born: Graham Charles Lay; 19 January 1960; Willesden, Greater London, UK
- Died: 27 November 2016 (aged 56)
- Occupation: Military antiques expert
- Years active: 1988–2016
- Television: Antiques Roadshow

Graham Charles Lay (Willesden, Greater London, UK, 19 January 1960 – 27 November 2016) was a British antiques expert specialising in arms, armour, militaria and military history. He was probably best known for his many appearances on BBC TVs Antiques Roadshow, on which he was one of the team of experts from 1988. He was always seen wearing a "Blue Peter" badge.

He appeared as an expert on other BBC TV antiques programmes, such as 20th Century Roadshow, Priceless Antiques Roadshow and Bargain Hunt. In Series 1, episode 6 of 20th Century Roadshow, recorded at Imperial War Museum Duxford, he valued a World War II Spitfire MkIX aircraft at between £1,000,000 and £1,500,000: the highest price for anything ever valued on the show.

== Books ==
He contributed to several books such as Antiques Roadshow Collectables, and wrote auction reviews and articles for newspapers and periodicals, including writing for Black Powder, the magazine of the Muzzle Loaders Association of Great Britain.

== Personal life ==
=== Death ===
He died at the end of 2016, having suffered from cystic fibrosis since birth, and he was remembered in the Antiques Roadshow highlights special on 28 December 2016, shown on BBC1.

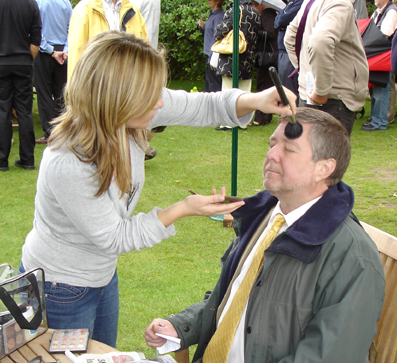
Being made-up before a recording, 2008

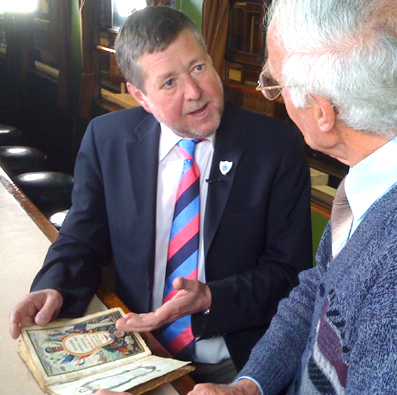
At a typical Antiques Roadshow recording, 2010

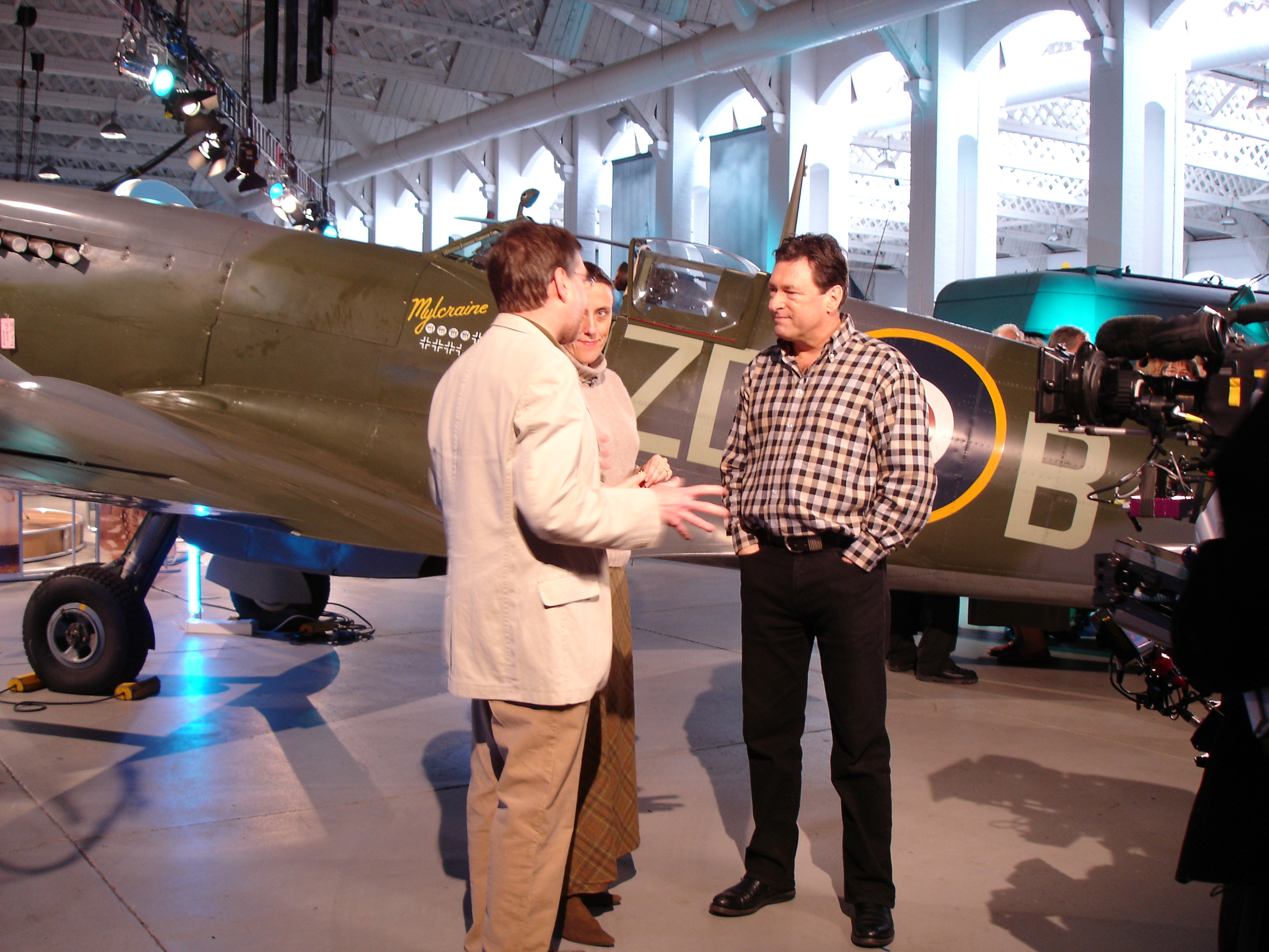
Discussing the value of the famous MH434 Spitfire MkIX B with the owner and Alan Titchmarsh, 2005
