= Hassan Sadpara =

Pakistani mountaineer, adventurer

Hassan Sadpara PP
- ﺣﺴﻦ ﺳﺪﭘﺎرہ
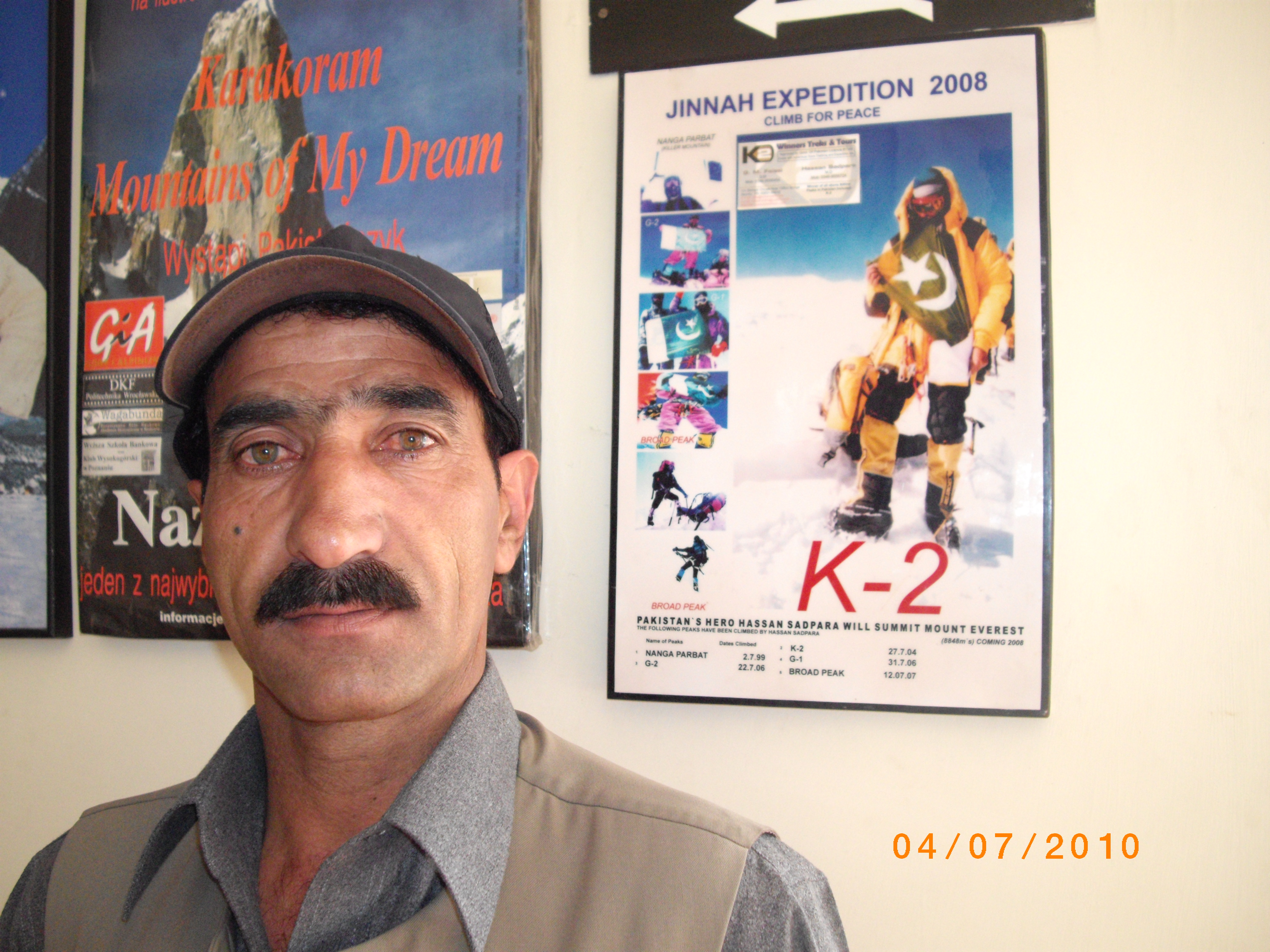
- Sadpara standing in front of his own poster in PTDC Skardu
- Born: Hassan Asad; 3 April 1964; Sadpara Village, Skardu
- Died: 21 November 2016 (aged 53)
- Occupations: Adventurer, Mountaineer, High Altitude Porter
- Website: www.hassansadparatreksandtours.com

Hassan Sadpara PP (born Hassan Asad; April 1963 – 21 November 2016) was a Pakistani mountaineer and adventurer from Skardu in Gilgit-Baltistan, Pakistan. He is the first Pakistani to have climbed six eight-thousanders including Mount Everest (8848m), K2 (8611m), Gasherbrum I (8080m), Gasherbrum II (8034m), Nanga Parbat (8126 m) and Kangchenjunga (8586m). Although, he is credited for summiting five of the eight-thousanders without supplemental oxygen but, contrary to initial reports, Hassan Sadpara clarified that he used supplemental oxygen during his Everest ascent due to bad weather.

== Background ==
Hassan Sadpara was born into a poor family in "Sadpara", a small village in a remote area of Baltistan, some 7 miles away from Skardu. There was no school during his childhood, so Hassan helped his family as a farmer and a shepherd. His biggest regret in life was that he never went to school; he was proud of providing education to his children. He had four children (3 sons and a daughter). His eldest son Arif is studying for a degree in Master of Business Administration

He began his mountaineering career as a high altitude porter in 1993 and became a celebrated climber after conquering Mount Everest. He owned a small shop of used mountaineering equipment in Skardu. It was his dedication and self-confidence that led him to the summits of the world's highest peaks.

== Career ==
He was the second Baltistani to have summited all five of the 8000m peaks of Pakistan, after Nisar Hussain (also of Sadpara village). Unlike most climbers from the West, who are equipped with state-of-the-art climbing gear (and often sponsored by multinational corporations), Hassan Sadpara began his career from scratch, with very few resources, and climbed with whatever gear he could manage to afford. He had worked as a porter for expeditions, including ones led by Koreans and Poles. He ran a shop for used and new mountaineering equipment in the Skardu bazaar.

After his successful summit of Mount Everest, he said in an interview that he could summit all the 14 eight-thousanders if he was sponsored and had requested the Pakistan government or international corporations in his regard. His other dream was to open a mountaineering school in his city so that he and others like him can transfer their knowledge to youth from around the world.

=== Award ===
In 2008, Government of Pakistan awarded him the President's Pride of Performance.

On 14 August 2019, Government of Pakistan posthumously awarded him the President's Pride of Performance for his numerous notable feats that include him being the first Pakistani to have scaled six eight-thousanders which also include the highest peak in the world, Mount Everest. The awards ceremony was held on 23 March 2020.

== Significant climbs ==
Unlike other well-equipped climbers sometimes sponsored by multinational companies, especially those from Western countries, Hassan was the only Pakistani who had climbed:

- K2 (8611m) on 27 July 2004
- Nanga Parbat (8126m) on 2 July 1999
- Gasherbrum I (G-1) (8080m) in 2006
- Kangchenjunga (8586m) in 2007
- Gasherbrum II (G-2) (8034m) in 2006
- Mount Everest (8848m) on 11 May 2011

== Death ==
On 8 October 2016, he was diagnosed with blood cancer. After a short stay at a private hospital in Rawalpindi, he was admitted to Combined Military Hospital. Hassan Sadpara died on 21 November 2016, at Combined Military Hospital, Rawalpindi, where he was being treated for multiple diseases including blood cancer. He was buried at his ancestral graveyard in Hargisa Shqthang Skardu.
