= Pit Kroke =

German artist and architect

PIT KROKE
- Rolf Peter Kroke
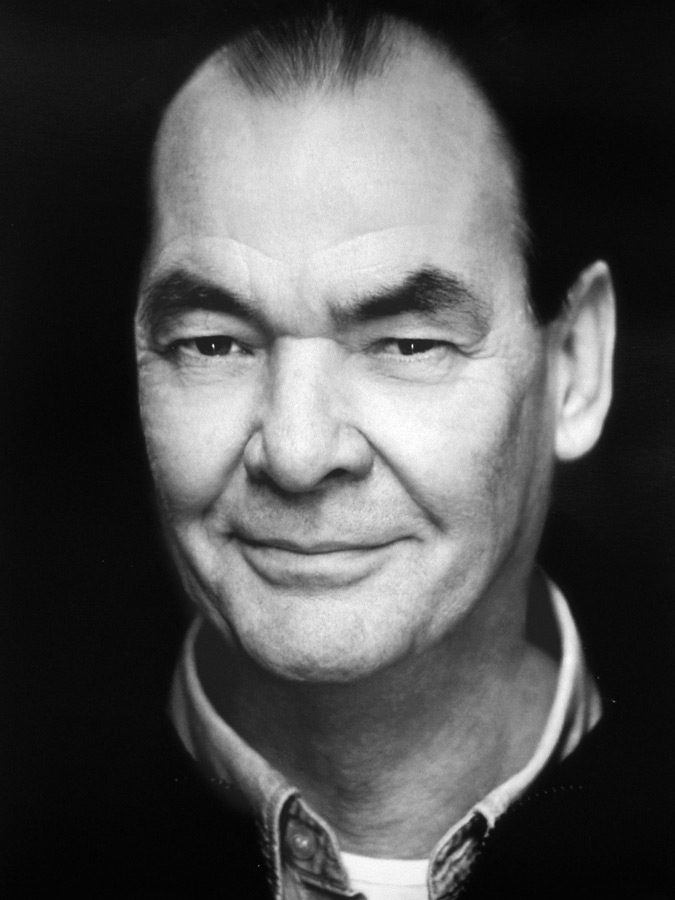
- Born: Rolf Peter Kroke; March 1, 1936; Fürstenwalde/Spree, Germany
- Died: November 1, 2016 (aged 80); Berlin, Germany
- Education: Academy of Fine Arts in Berlin
- Known for: Sculpture, Architectural
- Notable work: PROJEKT ZUR URBANEN KUNST / URBAN ART PROJECT STADTZEICHEN
- Website: https://pitkroke.com

Pit Kroke (born Rolf Peter Kroke: March 1, 1936 Fürstenwalde/Spree, Germany - November 1, 2016 Berlin, Germany) was a German artist and architect.

He studied sculpture under Hans Uhlmann at the Academy of Fine Arts in Berlin. There he also worked on experimental photography and abstract film, as well as working on architectural studies. In 1964, he went to Sardinia, where he initially worked as an architect. In 1981, he approached the free artistic activity again, which he devoted himself exclusively to since then. Since 1993, he has lived and worked in Berlin and Sardinia. He died 2016 in Berlin.

== Solo exhibitions ==
1986

- Galleria “Nuova 2000”, Bologna
- 5 Large sculptures in the historic Old town of Bologna

1987

- Galleria “Arte Duchamp”, Cagliari
- Erection of the sculpture Bos in Piazza della Costituzione, Bologna

1989

- Galleria “Il Millennio”, Rome
- Museo “Galleria d’arte Moderna, Villa delle Rose”, Bologna

1990

- Sculpture mile, Inner city of Munich
- 18 large sculptures in public space
- Wilhelm Lehmbruck Museum, Duisburg

1991

- Installation of the sculpture KEANAA in Essen
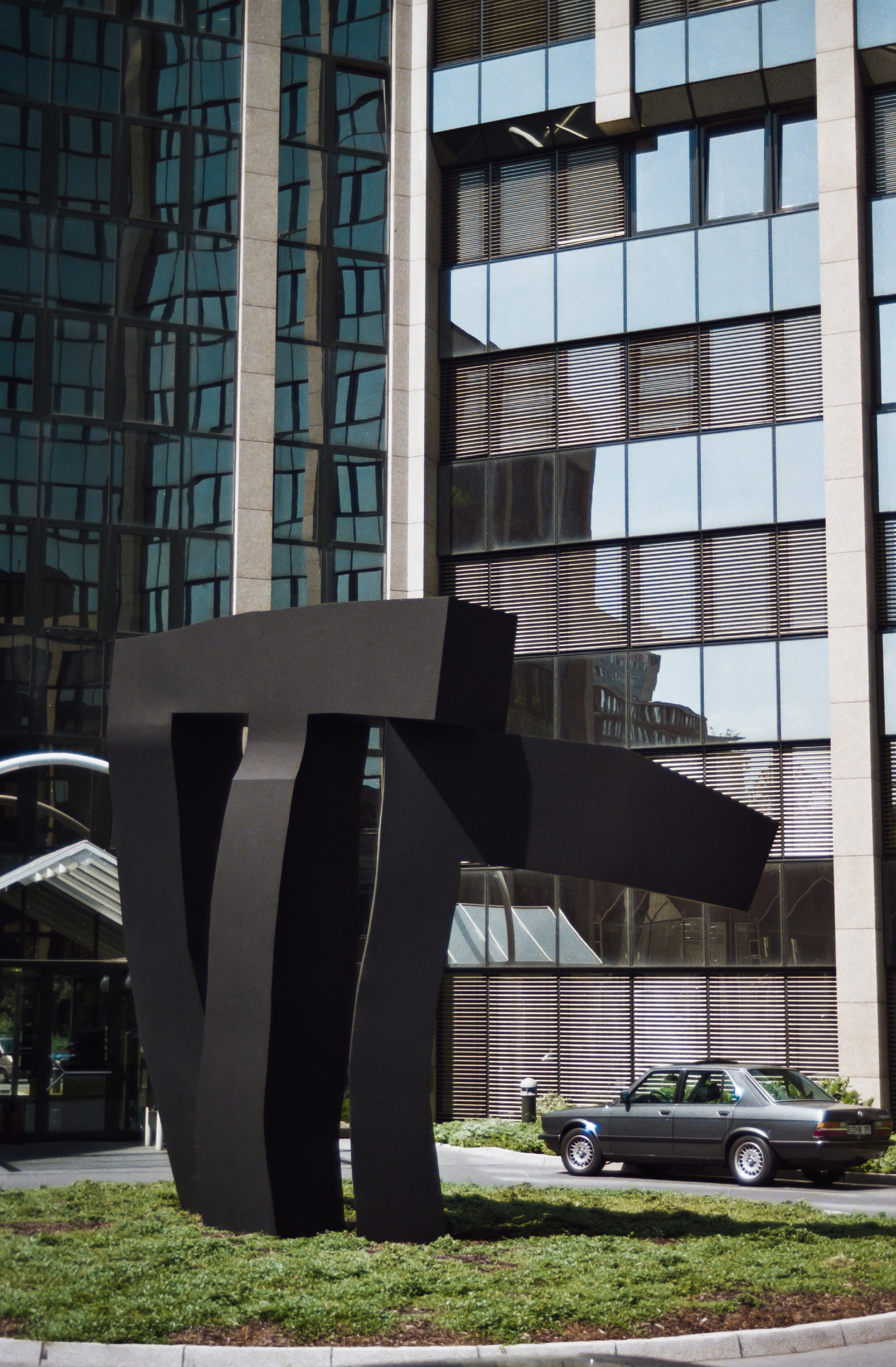
  Kaneaa 1989 sculpture by Pit Kroke
- Galleria “Il Millennio”, Rome
- Opening exhibition Goethe-House, New York City
- Temporary installation of the sculpture TIKO Central Park South, New York City
- District Museum, Hanover

1992

- Erection of the sculpture Tiko in front of the Queens Museum, New York C.
- Erection of the sculpture got in Hanover

1993

- Galerie Pabst, Frankfurt/Main
- Galerie Tammen & Busch, Berlin

1994

- Sculpture project “City Signs” in the Old Museum, Berlin
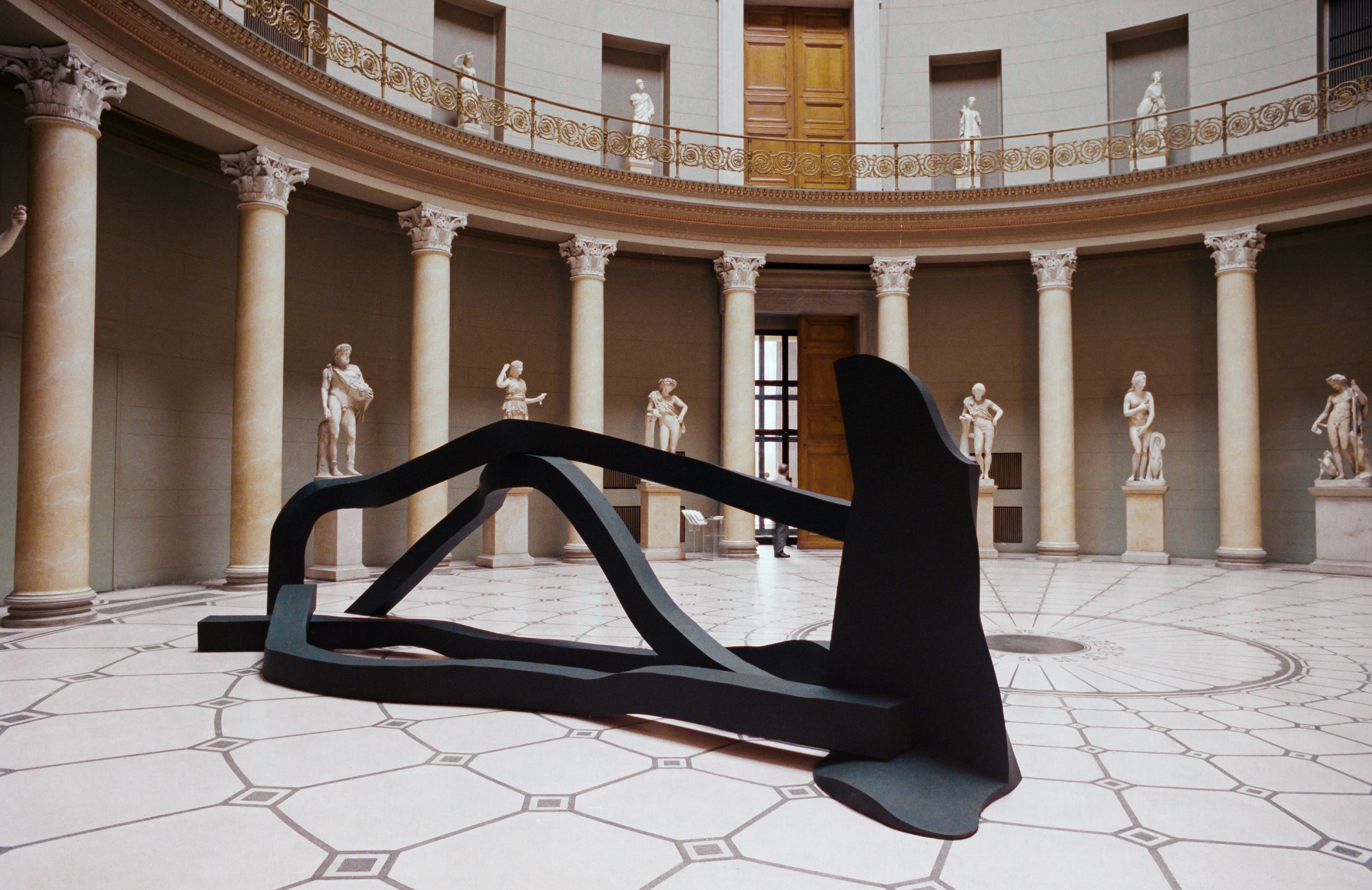
- Saxon Kunstverein, Dresden
- Town House Münster Platz, Ulm

1995

- Galerie Utermann and GalerieTammen & Busch, 7 large sculptures in the sculpture Park Harenberg City center, Dortmund
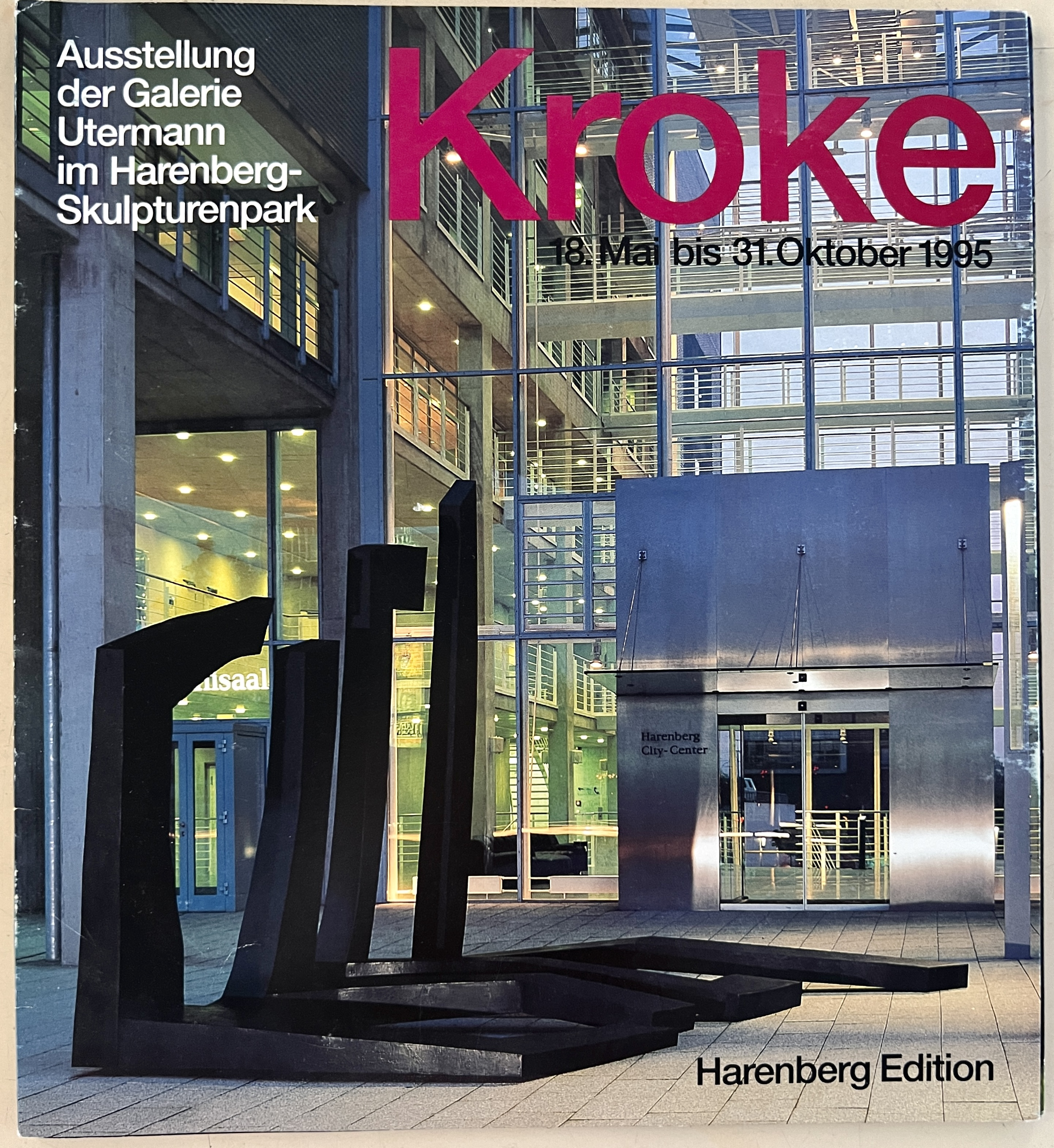
- Formation of the sculpture Gran Golar in the sculpture Garden of the Teutloff Collection at Brock University, Toronto

1996

- Municipal Cultural centre EXMÀ, Cagliari
- Temporary installation of the sculpture Lenz in Hackische Höfe, Berlin
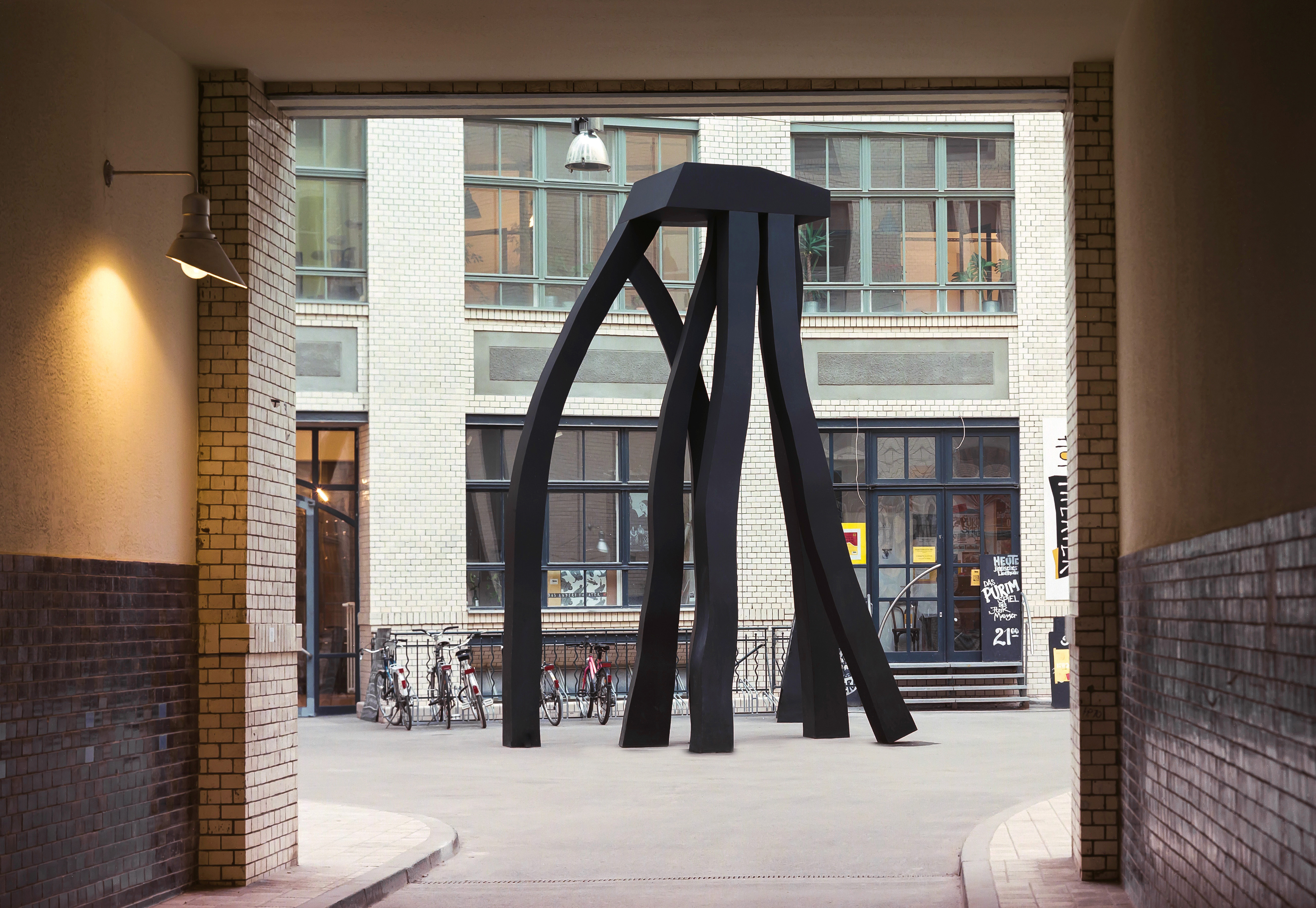

1997

- “Turnaround Time” at the Harenberg city center, Dortmund
- Architecture Gallery Aedes East, Berlin
- Galerie Tammen & Busch, Berlin

1998

- Installation of the sculpture Lenz at Olivaer Platz, Berlin
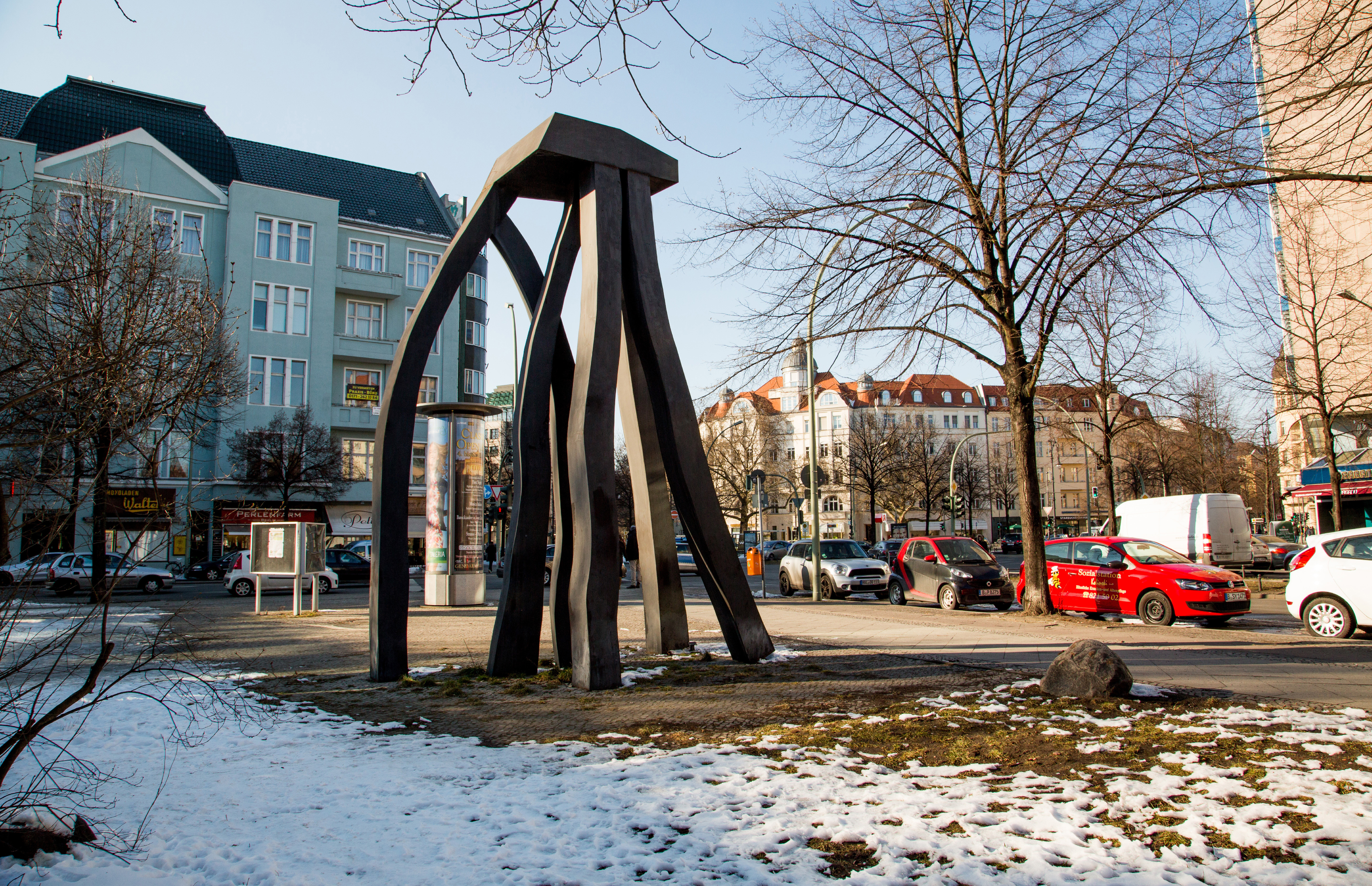

2003

- “Seeing and thinking” 19 in the Academy of Arts, Berlin
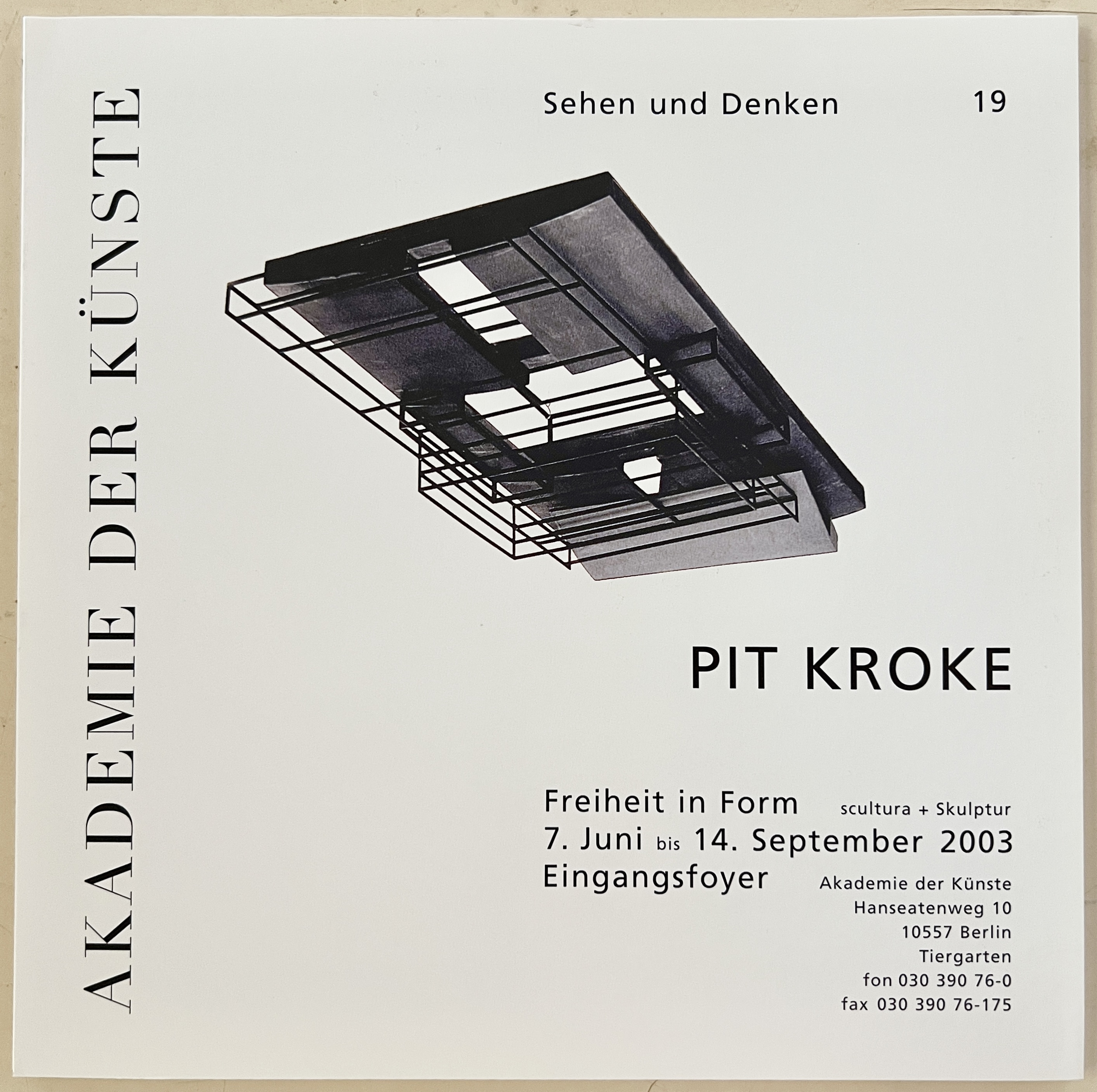

2008

- “Sculptural architecture – architectural sculptures” at the gallery Aedes am Pfeffer Mountain, Berlin

2010

- Establishment of TIKO Gerisch Foundation, Neumünster LINK

2013

- Installation DANOA Sculpture Park Queen Elisabeth Bergen Clinics, Berlin

2016

- Exhibition Comune San Teodoro, Italy
- Exhibition and installation Sculpture “Porta/Porta” San Teodoro, Italy

2018

- Ausstellung im Kabinett Pit Kroke: Zeichen • Skulptur • Grafik • Schmuck. Kunsthandel Dr. Wilfred Karger Berlin

2019

- “Photographie concrete” PhotoSanitGermain – Galerie Gimpel & Müller Paris https://pitkroke.com/concrete-photography-1958-1960/
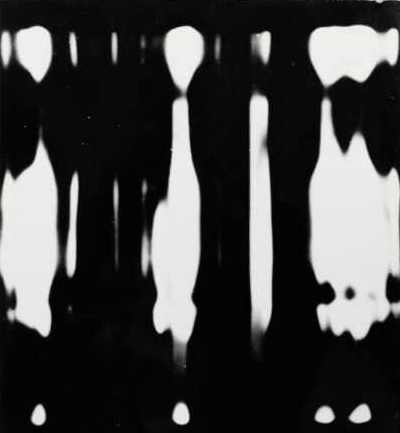

== Group exhibitions ==
1995 -

- Galerie L. Teutloff, Sculpture Park, Bielefeld

1997

- Willy Brandt Haus, Berlin, exhibition “Pictures of Germany”
- Galerie Pels-Leusden, “sculptures” Berlin/Kampen

1996

- Substation Berlin Kreuzberg, exhibition “Aggregate State” video sculpture Zippo
- State Chancellery in Brandenburg, Potsdam “graphic works”

1999

- Wilhelm Lehmbruck Museum, Duisburg – “Projects for Bunker Gallery” in Emscherpark

2000

- Wilhelm Lehmbruck Museum, Duisburg, “Global Art Rheinland 2000 – Cultural Spaces” sculpture since 1970

2009/10

- Wilhelm Lehmbruck Museum, Duisburg, “from Picasso to Warhol. Avant-garde sculpture jewellery “
- Herbert Gerisch Stiftung, Neumünster “seduction and Order” with Heike Weber,

2012/14

- Kings Elisabeth Bergen Klinik Park, Berlin “sculptures”

2013/14

- Kurhaus Ahrenshoop, “Berlin am Meer”, art trade Brusberg, sculpture 2TTRO
- Kunstverein Wilhelmshöhe, Ettlingen “Stahlkplastik in Germany yesterday and today”

2015

- Museum in the culture store, Würzburg “photograph and data image – traces of concrete photography”

2021

- “Photographie concrete” PhotoSanitGermain – Galerie Gimpel & Müller Paris
