= Angus Fletcher (critic) =

American critic

- Born: June 3, 1930
- Died: November 28, 2016 (aged 86); Albuquerque, New Mexico
- Education: B.A. and M.A. at Yale (1950, 1952); PhD at Harvard (1958)

Angus Fletcher (June 3, 1930 – November 28, 2016) was an American critic and literary scholar.

== Biography ==
Angus Fletcher was born on June 23, 1930 to Scottish parents. He grew up mainly in East Hampton, Long Island and New York City. His father, Sir Angus Somerville Fletcher, was a former director of the British Library of Information in New York, and his mother, Helen Stewart Fletcher, was a painter.

He earned a B.A. and M.A. from Yale University and a PhD in English Literature from Harvard University. Over the course of his career, he taught at Columbia, UCLA, Buffalo, Cornell and Lehman College at CUNY Graduate Center.

== Books ==
- Allegory: The Theory of a Symbolic Mode. Cornell: Cornell University Press, 1964.
- The prophetic moment; an essay on Spencer. Chicago: University of Chicago Press, 1971. ISBN 0226253325
- The Transcendental Masque; an Essay on Milton's Comus. Ithaca-London: Cornell University Press, 1971. ISBN 080140620X
- Colors of the Mind: Conjectures on Thinking in Literature. Cambridge, Mass. : Harvard University Press, 1991. ISBN 0-6741-4312-4
- A New Theory for American Poetry: Democracy, the Environment, and the Future of the Imagination. Cambridge, Mass. : Harvard University Press, 2004. ISBN 0-674-01988-1, 9780674019881
- Time, Space, and Motion in the Age of Shakespeare. Cambridge, Mass. : Harvard University Press, 2007. ISBN 9780674023086
- The Topological Imagination. Cambridge, Mass. : Harvard University Press, 2016. ISBN 9780674504561
