= S. J. Revich =

Canadian author (born 1932)

Stanley Joseph Revich (January 19, 1932 – November 27, 2016) was a Canadian author. He wrote under the name, S. J. Revich.

Revich was born in Toronto, Ontario to immigrants to Canada from Eastern Europe. He attended Harbord Collegiate Institute, and studied medicine at the University of Toronto where he graduated in 1956 with an M.D. degree.

After practicing medicine for thirty years, Revich began work on a series of novels with historical stories about the adventures of Jewish young people in Europe and the Middle East. He authored six books in the series, collectively titled "Tales from the East". The Tales from the East series was published by Bristol, Rhein, and Englander, and each volume sold several thousand copies worldwide.

S. J. Revich died in Toronto on November 27, 2016. His most recent work departed from the Jewish themed work of his earlier novels to explore the more universal theme of humanity's encounters with nature.

== Bibliography ==
- Ibrahim the Magician (Princeton, New Jersey, USA: Bristol, Rhein, and Englander, June 1987)
- The Camel Boy (Princeton, New Jersey, USA: Bristol, Rhein, and Englander, June 1987)
- Ezra the Physician (Princeton, New Jersey, USA: Bristol, Rhein, and Englander, July 1988)
- The Poet and the Thief (Princeton, New Jersey, USA: Bristol, Rhein, and Englander, June 1989)
- The Lion Tamer (Princeton, New Jersey, USA: Bristol, Rhein, and Englander, June 1990)
- The Prince and the Scholar (Princeton, New Jersey, USA: Bristol, Rhein, and Englander, June 1992)
- Bobcat Baillie and Other Tales (Revstan Publications, Toronto, September 2006)
