= Bruno Rangel =

Brazilian footballer (1981–2016)

Personal information
- Full name: Bruno Rangel Domingues
- Date of birth: 11 December 1981
- Place of birth: Campos dos Goytacazes, Brazil
- Date of death: 28 November 2016 (aged 34)
- Place of death: La Unión, Colombia
- Height: 1.81 m (5 ft 11 in)
- Position: Striker

Youth career
- 1997–2002: Abadia

Senior career*
Years	Team	Apps	(Gls)
2002–2004	Goytacaz		
2005–2006	Americano	12	(1)
2006–2007	Ananindeua	39	(15)
2007	Angra dos Reis		
2007	Macaé		
2008	Bonsucesso	4	(0)
2009	Baraúnas	20	(1)
2009	Águia de Marabá	7	(6)
2010	Paysandu	23	(16)
2011	Guarani	13	(1)
2011–2012	Joinville	33	(13)
2012	Metropolitano	7	(2)
2013	Chapecoense	48	(34)
2014	Al-Arabi	7	(2)
2014–2016	Chapecoense	96	(35)
Total		309	(126)
- * Club domestic league appearances and goals

Bruno Rangel Domingues (11 December 1981 – 28 November 2016) was a Brazilian professional footballer who played as a striker.

Rangel was one of the victims when LaMia Airlines Flight 2933 crashed on 28 November 2016.

== Career ==
Born in Campos dos Goytacazes, Rio de Janeiro, Rangel started playing as a senior for hometown club Goytacaz in 2002. In 2004, he moved to cross-town rivals Americano, but was rarely used at the club. After leaving the club in 2006, he worked as a general assistant for Caixa Econômica Federal before joining Ananindeua.

On 16 December 2006 Rangel renewed with the club, and subsequently represented Angra dos Reis, Macaé, Bonsucesso and Baraúnas before returning to Pará in 2009, with Águia de Marabá. After being the latter's top goalscorer in 2009 Série C with six goals in only seven matches, he signed for Paysandu on 1 December 2009.

On 23 December 2010, Rangel moved to Guarani also in the third division. He rescinded with the club the following 26 July, and agreed to a contract with Joinville just hours later. Released in June 2011, he subsequently joined Metropolitano.

In 2013, Rangel signed for Chapecoense. He also became a prolific striker during his first season at the club, scoring a career-best 31 goals in only 34 league matches; his side also achieved promotion to Série A. On 9 January of the following year he moved abroad for the first time in his career, joining Qatar Stars League side Al-Arabi SC.

After appearing rarely, Rangel returned to Chape on 1 June 2014. He made his return to the field on 19 July, in a 1–0 away win against São Paulo, and scored his first goal on 30 August in a 2–4 loss at Cruzeiro.

On 26 July 2015, Rangel scored all his team's goals in a 2–1 home win against Fluminense. He repeated the feat on 28 October, in a Copa Sudamericana home success over River Plate, but it was not enough to ensure qualification to the following round. On 12 December 2015, he renewed his contract for a further year.

Rangel finished the 2016 Campeonato Catarinense as both champion and top goalscorer, with ten goals under his name; during the tournament he became Chape's biggest goalscorer, surpassing Índio. On 1 June 2016 he scored a hat-trick in a 4–3 away win against Coritiba, and reached his 80th goal for the club on 7 September in a 2–2 draw against Santa Cruz, through a penalty kick.

On 29 October 2016, again from the spot, Rangel scored his last goal as a footballer, in a 1–1 away draw against Corinthians.

== Death ==
On 28 November 2016, while in the service of Chapecoense, Rangel was among the fatalities of the LaMia Airlines Flight 2933 accident in the Colombian village of Cerro Gordo, La Unión, Antioquia.

== Career statistics ==
Appearances and goals by club, season and competition
Club	Season	League			State League		Cup		Continental		Other		Total	
Club	Season	Division	Apps	Goals	Apps	Goals	Apps	Goals	Apps	Goals	Apps	Goals	Apps	Goals
Americano	2005	Série C	—		1	0	—		—		—		1	0
Americano	2006	Série C	0	0	11	1	—		—		—		11	1
Americano	Total		0	0	12	1	—		—		—		12	1
Ananindeua	2006	Série C	18	8	—		—		—		—		18	8
Ananindeua	2007	Série C	0	0	21	7	—		—		—		21	7
Ananindeua	Total		18	8	21	7	—		—		—		39	15
Bonsucesso	2008	Carioca Série B	—		4	0	—		—		—		4	0
Baraúnas	2009	Potiguar	—		20	1	—		—		—		20	1
Águia de Marabá	2009	Série C	7	6	—		—		—		—		7	6
Paysandu	2010	Série C	10	8	13	8	2	1	—		—		25	17
Guarani	2011	Série C	0	0	13	1	4	0	—		—		17	1
Joinville	2011	Série C	13	4	—		—		—		—		13	4
Joinville	2012	Série B	2	0	18	9	—		—		—		20	9
Joinville	Total		15	4	18	9	—		—		—		33	13
Metropolitano	2012	Série D	7	2	—		—		—		6 (Note: Appearance(s) in Copa Santa Catarina)	3	13	5
Chapecoense	2013	Série B	34	31	14	3	—		—		—		48	34
Al-Arabi	2013–14	Qatar Stars League	7	2	—		—		—		—		7	2
Chapecoense	2014	Série A	20	3	—		1	0	—		—		21	3
Chapecoense	2015	Série A	19	9	8	3	3	3	2 (Note: Appearance(s) in Copa Sudamericana)	2	—		32	17
Chapecoense	2016	Série A	31	10	18	10	4	1	8	2	—		61	23
Chapecoense	Total		70	22	26	13	7	4	10	4	—		113	43
Career total			168	83	141	43	14	5	10	4	6	3	339	138

== Honours ==
Paysandu

- Campeonato Paraense: 2010

Joinville

- Campeonato Brasileiro Série C: 2011

Chapecoense

- Campeonato Catarinense: 2016
- Copa Sudamericana: 2016 (posthumously)

Individual

- Campeonato Catarinense top goalscorer: 2016
- Top goalscorer for Chapecoense in official competitions: 77 goals
- Top goalscorer for Chapecoense overall: 81 goals
