= Moisés Ribeiro =

Brazilian footballer

Personal information
- Full name: Moisés Ribeiro Santos
- Date of birth: 3 March 1991 (age 35)
- Place of birth: Salvador, Brazil
- Height: 1.79 m (5 ft 10 1/2 in)
- Position: Midfielder

Team information
- Current team: Gama

Youth career
- 2009–2010: Portuguesa
- 2010–2011: Corinthians

Senior career*
Years	Team	Apps	(Gls)
2011–2014	Corinthians	0	(0)
2012	→ Olaria (loan)	12	(1)
2012–2013	→ Bragantino (loan)	16	(0)
2013–2014	→ Boa Esporte (loan)	35	(0)
2014	→ Mogi Mirim (loan)	7	(0)
2015–2016	Linense	13	(0)
2015	→ Sampaio Corrêa (loan)	11	(0)
2015	→ Avispa Fukuoka (loan)	3	(0)
2016	→ Chapecoense (loan)	10	(0)
2017–2021	Chapecoense	70	(0)
2022	Ponte Preta	15	(0)
2023	Santo André	8	(0)
2023	CSA	16	(0)
2024	Retrô	8	(0)
2024	Tombense	8	(0)
2025–	Gama	33	(0)
2025	→ Sergipe (loan)	4	(0)
- * Club domestic league appearances and goals as of 19 November 2026

Moisés Ribeiro Santos (born 3 March 1991), known as Moisés Ribeiro or simply Moisés, is a Brazilian footballer who plays as a midfielder for Gama.

== Club career ==
Born in Salvador, Bahia, Moisés started playing as a senior with Olaria, on loan from Corinthians. On 1 June 2012, he was presented at Bragantino.

Moisés subsequently represented Boa Esporte, Mogi Mirim, Linense and Sampaio Corrêa before signing with J2 League club Avispa Fukuoka on 21 July 2015. He only appeared in three matches for the club, with his debut being on 1 November in a 4–0 home routing of Yokohama FC.

On 18 December 2015 Moisés joined Série A club Chapecoense. He made his debut in the category on 1 June 2016, coming on as a second half substitute for Josimar in a 4–3 away win against Coritiba.

Moisés did not board LaMia Airlines Flight 2933 for the 2016 Copa Sudamericana Finals, which crashed and killed 19 of his teammates. He subsequently became a starter for the club in the 2017 season, but was suspended for two years in August 2018 after testing positive for the use of steroid hormone corticosteroids in a Copa Libertadores match.

In February 2020, shortly after serving his ban, Moisés suffered a knee injury which sidelined him for most of the 2020 campaign. He only returned to action in February 2021, in a Recopa Catarinense match.

== Career statistics ==
As of 25 October 2021

Club	Season	League			State League		Cup		Continental		Other		Total	
Club	Season	Division	Apps	Goals	Apps	Goals	Apps	Goals	Apps	Goals	Apps	Goals	Apps	Goals
Olaria	2012	Carioca	—		12	1	—		—		—		12	1
Bragantino	2012	Série B	12	0	—		—		—		—		12	0
Bragantino	2013	Série B	0	0	4	0	—		—		—		4	0
Bragantino	Subtotal		12	0	4	0	—		—		—		16	0
Boa Esporte	2013	Série B	14	0	—		—		—		—		14	0
Boa Esporte	2014	Série B	9	0	12	0	—		—		—		21	0
Boa Esporte	Subtotal		23	0	12	0	—		—		—		35	0
Mogi Mirim	2014	Série C	7	0	—		—		—		—		7	0
Linense	2015	Paulista	—		13	0	—		—		—		13	0
Sampaio Corrêa	2015	Série B	11	0	—		2	0	—		—		13	0
Avispa Fukuoka	2015	J2 League	3	0	—		—		—		—		3	0
Chapecoense	2016	Série A	4	0	6	0	3	0	0	0	—		13	0
Chapecoense	2017	Série A	23	0	5	0	0	0	4 (Note: Appearance(s) in Copa Libertadores)	0	2 (Note: Appearance(s) in Recopa Sudamericana)	0	4	0
Chapecoense	2018	Série A	0	0	5	0	0	0	1	0	—		6	0
Chapecoense	2019	Série A	0	0	0	0	0	0	—		—		0	0
Chapecoense	2020	Série B	0	0	0	0	0	0	—		—		0	0
Chapecoense	2021	Série A	18	0	11	0	2	0	—		1 (Note: Appearance(s) in Recopa Catarinense)	0	32	0
Chapecoense	Subtotal		45	0	27	0	5	0	5	0	3	0	85	0
Career total			101	0	68	1	7	0	5	0	3	0	184	1

== Honours ==
Chapecoense

- Campeonato Catarinense: 2016, 2017
