= Danilo (footballer, born 1985) =

Brazilian footballer (1985–2016)

Personal information
- Full name: Marcos Danilo Padilha
- Date of birth: 31 July 1985
- Place of birth: Jussara, Brazil
- Date of death: 28 November 2016 (aged 31)
- Place of death: La Unión, Colombia
- Height: 1.85 m (6 ft 1 in)
- Position: Goalkeeper

Youth career
- 1996–2005: Cianorte

Senior career*
Years	Team	Apps	(Gls)
2004–2007	Cianorte		
2006	→ Engenheiro Beltrão (loan)		
2008	Nacional-PR		
2009	Paranavaí	17	(0)
2009–2010	Operário Ferroviário	24	(0)
2010–2011	Arapongas	22	(0)
2011–2013	Londrina	55	(0)
2013	→ Chapecoense (loan)	1	(0)
2013–2016	Chapecoense	135	(0)
Total		253	(0)
- * Club domestic league appearances and goals

Marcos Danilo Padilha (31 July 1985 – 28 November 2016), simply known as Danilo, was a Brazilian footballer who last played for Chapecoense as a goalkeeper.

Danilo was one of the 71 people who died in the LaMia Airlines Flight 2933 crash on 28 November 2016.

== Club career ==
Born in Jussara, Paraná, Danilo made his senior debut with hometown's Cianorte. After subsequently playing for lower teams in the same state (notably Operário and Arapongas), he joined Londrina in May 2011.

In September 2013 Danilo joined Chapecoense on loan until the end of the year. He made his professional debut on 23 November, starting in a 2–1 away win against Icasa for the Série B championship; it was his maiden appearance in the competition, as his side finished second and was promoted to Série A for the first time ever.

In January 2014 Danilo joined Chape permanently, and made his top level debut on 19 April 2014, starting and keeping a clean sheet in a 0–0 home draw against Coritiba. He was an ever-present figure during the campaign, being an important defensive unit as his side maintained its division status.

== Personal life ==
Danilo lived in Chapecó with his wife Leticia and their son, Lorenzo.

== Death ==
Danilo and his club were aboard LaMia Airlines Flight 2933 when it crashed in Colombia on 28 November 2016. Danilo was initially believed to have survived the crash and to have died the next day at a hospital in La Ceja, but later the hospital stated that he had never been brought in but rather had died at the scene of the accident.

== Career statistics ==
Club	Season	League			State League		Cup		Continental		Other		Total	
Club	Season	Division	Apps	Goals	Apps	Goals	Apps	Goals	Apps	Goals	Apps	Goals	Apps	Goals
Paranavaí	2009	Paranaense	—		17	0	—		—		—		17	0
Operário Ferroviário	2009	Paranaense Série Prata	—		16	0	—		—		—		16	0
Operário Ferroviário	2010	Paranaense	—		8	0	—		—		—		8	0
Operário Ferroviário	Subtotal		—		24	0	—		—		—		24	0
Arapongas	2011	Paranaense	—		22	0	—		—		—		22	0
Londrina	2012	Série D	10	0	21	0	—		—		—		31	0
Londrina	2013	Série D	0	0	24	0	—		—		—		24	0
Londrina	Subtotal		10	0	45	0	—		—		—		55	0
Chapecoense	2013	Série B	1	0	—		—		—		—		1	0
Chapecoense	2014	Série A	37	0	10	0	2	0	—		—		49	0
Chapecoense	2015	Série A	33	0	4	0	2	0	4 (Note: Appearance(s) in Copa Sudamericana)	0	—		43	0
Chapecoense	2016	Série A	31	0	19	0	2	0	7	0	—		59	0
Chapecoense	Subtotal		102	0	33	0	6	0	11	0	—		152	0
Career total			112	0	141	0	6	0	11	0	0	0	270	0

== Honours ==
Chapecoense

- Campeonato Catarinense: 2016
- Copa Sudamericana: 2016 (posthumously)
