= Tiaguinho (footballer, born 1994) =

Brazilian footballer (1994–2016)

Personal information
- Full name: Tiago da Rocha Vieira
- Date of birth: 4 June 1994
- Place of birth: Trajano de Morais, Brazil
- Date of death: 28 November 2016 (aged 22)
- Place of death: La Unión, Colombia
- Height: 1.70 m (5 ft 7 in)
- Position: Forward

Youth career
- São Pedro-RJ
- Corinthians
- XV de Piracicaba

Senior career*
Years	Team	Apps	(Gls)
2014–2015	XV de Piracicaba	8	(1)
2015–2016	Metropolitano	20	(6)
2015	→ Cianorte (loan)	0	(0)
2016	Chapecoense	16	(4)
Total		44	(11)
- * Club domestic league appearances and goals as of 30 November 2016

Tiago da Rocha Vieira (4 June 1994 – 28 November 2016), known as Tiaguinho, was a Brazilian football player who last played for Chapecoense.

Tiaguinho was one of the victims when LaMia Airlines Flight 2933 crashed on 28 November 2016.

== Personal life ==
On 12 December 2015, Tiaguinho married his wife Graziele de Aquino Alves. A week before the accident, Tiaguinho found out he was to be a father. His teammates helped his wife deliver the message that she was pregnant and filmed the moment. His reaction was to yell with happiness, hug his teammates and make cradling motions as if he was holding a baby. According to his cousin Gilmara Marins, he always wanted to be a young father. On 19 July 2017, Tiaguinho's son was born. His wife named his child after him.

== Club career ==
Born in Trajano de Morais, Rio de Janeiro, Tiaguinho finished his formation with XV de Piracicaba. He made his senior debut on 2 August 2014, coming on as a second half substitute in a 2–0 home win against Independente for the Copa Paulista championship.

Tiaguinho joined Metropolitano on 1 July 2015, ahead of the year's Série D. After the club's first-round knockout, he was loaned to Cianorte for three months.

Returning in January 2016, Tiaguinho impressed during the 2016 Campeonato Catarinense for Metrô, but still rescinded his contract – which was due to expire on 30 June – on 31 May. Nine days later, he was presented at Série A club Chapecoense.

Tiaguinho made his top tier debut on 11 June 2016, replacing Lucas Gomes in a 1–2 away loss against Ponte Preta. His first goals in the category came on 18 September, as he scored a double in a 2–2 home draw against the same opponent.

Tiaguinho subsequently became a regular starter at Chape, helping the side to reach the 2016 Copa Sudamericana Finals and scoring the club's last goal before the tragedy, in a 2–0 home win against São Paulo on 20 November.

== Death ==
On 28 November 2016, whilst travelling with Chapecoense to the aforementioned finals, Tiaguinho was among the fatalities of the LaMia Flight 2933 accident in the Colombian village of Cerro Gordo, La Unión, Antioquia.

== Career statistics ==
As of 27 November 2016

Club	Season	League			State League		Cup		Continental		Other		Total	
Club	Season	Division	Apps	Goals	Apps	Goals	Apps	Goals	Apps	Goals	Apps	Goals	Apps	Goals
XV de Piracicaba	2014	Paulista	—		0	0	—		—		13 (Note: Appearance(s) in Copa Paulista)	1	13	1
XV de Piracicaba	2015	Paulista	—		8	1	—		—		—		8	1
XV de Piracicaba	Subtotal		—		8	1	—		—		13	1	21	2
Metropolitano	2015	Série D	7	1	—		—		—		—		7	1
Metropolitano	2016	Série D	0	0	13	5	—		—		—		13	5
Metropolitano	Subtotal		7	1	13	5	—		—		—		20	6
Cianorte (loan)	2015	Paranaense Série Prata	—		0	0	—		—		4 (Note: Appearance(s) in Taça FPF)	2	4	2
Chapecoense	2016	Série A	16	4	—		0	0	7 (Note: Appearance(s) in Copa Sudamericana)	0	—		23	4
Career total			23	5	21	6	0	0	7	0	17	3	68	14

== Honours ==
Chapecoense

- Copa Sudamericana: 2016 (posthumously)
