= Alan Ruschel =

Brazilian footballer (born 1989)

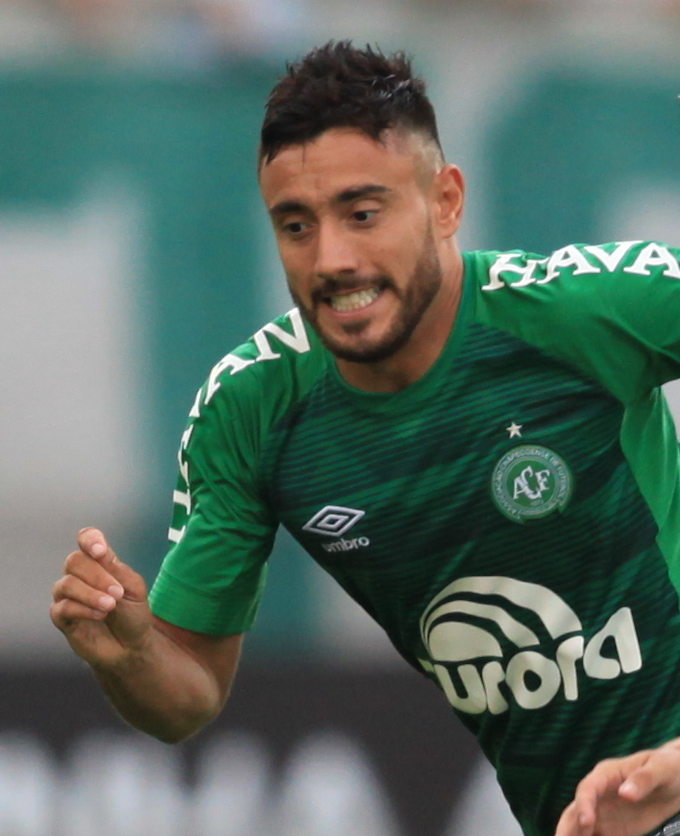
- Ruschel with Chapecoense in 2018

Personal information
- Full name: Alan Luciano Ruschel
- Date of birth: 23 August 1989 (age 37)
- Place of birth: Nova Hartz, Brazil
- Height: 1.74 m (5 ft 8 1/2 in)
- Position: Left back

Youth career
- 2008: Juventude

Senior career*
Years	Team	Apps	(Gls)
2009–2013	Juventude	61	(2)
2010–2011	→ Pelotas (loan)	16	(1)
2011	→ Luverdense (loan)	12	(0)
2013	Chapecoense	6	(1)
2014–2017	Internacional	28	(0)
2015	→ Atlético Paranaense (loan)	1	(0)
2016–2017	→ Chapecoense (loan)	10	(0)
2018–2021	Chapecoense	70	(1)
2019	→ Goiás (loan)	9	(1)
2021	Cruzeiro	5	(0)
2021	→ América Mineiro (loan)	21	(0)
2022	Londrina	27	(1)
2023–2026	Juventude	109	(4)
Total		375	(11)
- * Club domestic league appearances and goals

Alan Luciano Ruschel (Brazilian Portuguese: [ˈalɐ̃ ˈʁuʃew]; born 23 August 1989), known as Alan Ruschel, is a Brazilian former professional football player who played as a left back.

Ruschel was one of just six survivors in the crash of LaMia Airlines Flight 2933, which killed 71 people including 19 Chapecoense players, and the only one of the three footballers who survived to return to professional football.

== Club career ==
Born in Nova Hartz, Rio Grande do Sul, Ruschel started his career at Juventude. He made his senior debut on 20 January 2009, starting in a 1–0 Campeonato Gaúcho home win against Sapucaiense.

Despite appearing regularly in the year's Gauchão, Ruschel never established himself a starter for Juventude, and subsequently served loans at Pelotas and Luverdense. In May 2013, he joined Chapecoense permanently.

On 3 July 2013, Ruschel was caught in a doping exam, and was suspended for six months on 6 August. On 26 December of that year, however, he signed for Série A club Internacional.

A backup to Fabrício, Ruschel made his top tier debut on 14 September 2014 by starting in a 2–0 home win against Botafogo. The following 8 January, he signed a new three-year deal with the club.

On 6 August 2015, Ruschel was loaned to fellow top-tier club Atlético Paranaense, until December. After appearing in just one match, he suffered a knee injury and his loan was cut short.

On 7 June 2016, Ruschel returned to Chape, now in a temporary deal until the end of the campaign. He acted as a second-choice to Dener as his side reached the 2016 Copa Sudamericana finals for the first time ever.

On 14 November 2026, Ruschel retired from playing football.

== LaMia Flight 2933 accident ==
On 28 November 2016, while travelling with Chapecoense to the aforementioned finals, Ruschel was one of only six survivors of the LaMia Flight 2933 accident in the Colombian village of Cerro Gordo, La Unión, Antioquia. The first person to arrive at the hospital, he had a back injury which was later fixed through surgery. A few days later, a video was recorded with Ruschel walking again.

On 7 August 2017, Ruschel played his first match since the incident, playing in the 2017 Joan Gamper Trophy for the first 35 minutes and receiving a standing ovation along with his other two surviving teammates.

== Career statistics ==
As of 22 February 2024

Club	Season	League			State League		Cup		Continental		Other		Total	
Club	Season	Division	Apps	Goals	Apps	Goals	Apps	Goals	Apps	Goals	Apps	Goals	Apps	Goals
Juventude	2009	Série B	6	0	13	0	0	0	—		—		19	0
Juventude	2010	Série C	0	0	1	0	1	0	—		—		2	0
Juventude	2012	Série D	9	0	16	0	3	0	—		10 (Note: Appearance(s) in Copa FGF)	2	38	2
Juventude	2013	Série D	0	0	16	2	1	1	—		—		17	3
Juventude	Total		15	0	46	2	5	1	—		10	2	76	5
Pelotas (loan)	2010	Série D	3	0	—		—		—		—		3	0
Pelotas (loan)	2011	Gaúcho	—		13	1	—		—		—		13	1
Pelotas (loan)	Total		3	0	13	1	—		—		—		16	1
Luverdense (loan)	2011	Série C	12	0	—		—		—		—		12	0
Chapecoense	2013	Série B	6	1	—		—		—		—		6	1
Internacional	2014	Série A	5	0	5	0	1	1	1 (Note: Appearance(s) in Copa Sudamericana)	0	—		12	1
Internacional	2015	Série A	6	0	12	0	0	0	1 (Note: Appearance(s) in Copa Libertadores)	0	—		19	0
Internacional	Total		11	0	17	0	1	1	2	0	—		31	1
Atlético Paranaense (loan)	2015	Série A	1	0	—		0	0	1	0	—		2	0
Chapecoense	2016	Série A	5	0	—		0	0	0	0	—		5	0
Chapecoense	2017	Série A	5	0	—		0	0	2	0	—		7	0
Chapecoense	2018	Série A	6	0	8	0	1	0	1	0	—		16	0
Chapecoense	2019	Série A	6	0	9	1	1	0	1	0	—		17	1
Chapecoense	2020	Série B	27	0	14	0	2	0	—		—		43	0
Chapecoense	Total		49	0	31	1	4	0	4	0	—		88	1
Goiás (loan)	2019	Série A	9	1	—		—		—		3 (Note: Appearance(s) in Copa Verde)	0	12	1
Cruzeiro	2021	Série B	0	0	5	0	1	0	—		—		6	0
América Mineiro (loan)	2021	Série A	21	0	—		—		—		—		21	0
Londrina	2022	Série B	27	1	—		—		—		—		27	1
Juventude	2023	Série B	32	3	8	0	1	0	—		—		41	3
Juventude	2024	Série A	0	0	7	0	0	0	—		—		7	0
Juventude	Total		32	3	15	0	1	0	—		—		48	3
Career total			186	6	149	4	12	2	7	0	13	2	367	15

== Honours ==
Juventude

- Copa FGF: 2012

Internacional

- Campeonato Gaúcho: 2014, 2015

Chapecoense

- Copa Sudamericana: 2016
- Campeonato Brasileiro Série B: 2020
