= Lucas Gomes (footballer, born 1990) =

Brazilian footballer (1990–2016)

Personal information
- Full name: Lucas Gomes da Silva
- Date of birth: 29 May 1990
- Place of birth: Bragança, Brazil
- Date of death: 28 November 2016 (aged 26)
- Place of death: La Unión, Colombia
- Height: 1.77 m (5 ft 9 1/2 in)
- Position: Forward

Youth career
- Bragantino-PA

Senior career*
| Years | Team | Apps | (Gls) |
| 2010 | Bragantino-PA | 14 | (2) |
| 2011 | São Raimundo-PA | 9 | (0) |
| 2011 | Trem | 11 | (1) |
| 2012 | Castanhal | 23 | (10) |
| 2012 | Ananindeua | 8 | (3) |
| 2013 | Tuna Luso | 12 | (5) |
| 2013–2016 | Londrina | 25 | (3) |
| 2013 | → Sampaio Corrêa (loan) | 10 | (3) |
| 2014 | → Icasa (loan) | 22 | (6) |
| 2015 | → Fluminense (loan) | 27 | (2) |
| 2016 | → Chapecoense (loan) | 44 | (6) |
| Total | | 205 | (41) |
- * Club domestic league appearances and goals

Lucas Gomes da Silva (29 May 1990 – 28 November 2016), known as Lucas Gomes, was a Brazilian footballer who played for Chapecoense as a forward.

Lucas Gomes was one of the victims when LaMia Airlines Flight 2933 crashed on 28 November 2016.

== Club career ==
Born in Bragança, Pará, Lucas Gomes made his senior debut with Bragantino Clube do Pará in 2010. After representing clubs mainly in his native state, he signed for Londrina on 4 May 2013.

On 18 September 2013 Lucas Gomes was loaned to Sampaio Corrêa in Série C, achieving promotion with the club. He returned to Londrina in December, appearing with the side in Campeonato Paranaense, and moved to Icasa on 11 July 2014, also in a temporary deal.

Lucas Gomes made his professional debut on 8 August 2014, coming on as a second-half substitute for Vanger in a 2–0 home win against América-MG for the Série B championship. He scored his first goal in the competition on 12 September, netting the first in a 1–1 home draw against Joinville, and finished the year with 22 appearances and six goals.

On 23 December 2014 Lucas Gomes was loaned to Fluminense for a year. He made his Série A debut the following 17 May, replacing Vinícius in a 1–4 away loss against Atlético Mineiro.

Lucas Gomes' first goal in the top tier occurred on 2 July 2015, the winner in a 2–1 home success over Santos. He featured in 15 league matches during the year, but all as a substitute. On 4 January 2016 he moved to fellow league team Chapecoense, after agreeing to a one-year loan deal.

== Death ==
On 28 November 2016, whilst at the service of Chapecoense, Lucas Gomes was among the fatalities of the LaMia Airlines Flight 2933 accident in the Colombian village of Cerro Gordo, La Unión, Antioquia.

== Career statistics ==
As of 27 November 2016

| Club | Season | League | | | State League | | Cup | | Continental | | Other | | Total | |
| Club | Season | Division | Apps | Goals | Apps | Goals | Apps | Goals | Apps | Goals | Apps | Goals | Apps | Goals |
|---|---|---|---|---|---|---|---|---|---|---|---|---|---|---|
| Bragantino-PA | 2010 | Paraense | — | | 14 | 2 | — | | — | | — | | 14 | 2 |
| São Raimundo-PA | 2011 | Paraense | — | | 9 | 0 | — | | — | | — | | 9 | 0 |
| Trem | 2011 | Série D | 11 | 1 | — | | — | | — | | — | | 11 | 1 |
| Castanhal | 2012 | Paraense | — | | 23 | 10 | — | | — | | — | | 23 | 10 |
| Ananindeua | 2012 | Paraense | — | | 8 | 3 | — | | — | | — | | 8 | 3 |
| Tuna Luso | 2013 | Paraense | — | | 12 | 5 | — | | — | | — | | 12 | 5 |
| Londrina | 2013 | Série D | 8 | 3 | — | | — | | — | | — | | 8 | 3 |
| Londrina | 2014 | Série D | 0 | 0 | 17 | 0 | 3 | 0 | — | | — | | 20 | 0 |
| Londrina | Subtotal | | 8 | 3 | 17 | 0 | 3 | 0 | — | | — | | 28 | 3 |
| Sampaio Corrêa (loan) | 2013 | Série C | 10 | 3 | — | | — | | — | | — | | 10 | 3 |
| Icasa (loan) | 2014 | Série B | 22 | 6 | — | | — | | — | | 5 (Note: Appearance(s) in Copa Fares Lopes) | 4 | 29 | 10 |
| Fluminense (loan) | 2015 | Série A | 15 | 1 | 12 | 1 | 1 | 0 | — | | — | | 28 | 2 |
| Chapecoense (loan) | 2016 | Série A | 26 | 3 | 18 | 3 | 5 | 1 | 6 (Note: Appearance(s) in Copa Sudamericana) | 1 | — | | 55 | 8 |
| Career total | | | 92 | 17 | 113 | 24 | 9 | 1 | 6 | 1 | 5 | 4 | 225 | 47 |

== Honours ==
Icasa

- Copa Fares Lopes: 2014

Chapecoense

- Campeonato Catarinense: 2016
- Copa Sudamericana: 2016 (posthumously)
