= Kempes (Brazilian footballer) =

Brazilian footballer (1982–2016)

Everton Kempes

Personal information
- Full name: Everton Kempes dos Santos Gonçalves
- Date of birth: 3 August 1982
- Place of birth: Carpina, Brazil
- Date of death: 28 November 2016 (aged 34)
- Place of death: La Unión, Colombia
- Height: 1.83 m (6 ft 0 in)
- Position: Forward

Youth career
- 1999–2001: Canto do Rio

Senior career*
Years	Team	Apps	(Gls)
2001	Canto do Rio		
2002–2003	Nacional de Muriaé		
2004	Paraná	2	(0)
2005	Estrela do Norte	3	(0)
2006	Vitória-ES	17	(5)
2006	Sertãozinho	19	(4)
2007	15 de Novembro	15	(8)
2007	Ceará	0	(0)
2008	Caxias	13	(5)
2008	→ Ipatinga (loan)	14	(1)
2009	Criciúma	18	(9)
2009–2013	Portuguesa	47	(10)
2010	→ Novo Hamburgo (loan)	9	(1)
2010	→ Ceará (loan)	9	(0)
2011	→ América Mineiro (loan)	32	(13)
2012	→ Cerezo Osaka (loan)	27	(7)
2013–2014	JEF United Chiba	71	(35)
2015	Joinville	39	(9)
2016	Chapecoense	44	(14)
Total		379	(121)
- * Club domestic league appearances and goals

Everton Kempes dos Santos Gonçalves (3 August 1982 – 28 November 2016), commonly known as Kempes, was a Brazilian professional footballer who last played as a forward for Chapecoense. He was named after Argentine player Mario Kempes.

Kempes was one of the victims when LaMia Airlines Flight 2933 crashed on 28 November 2016.

== Career ==
Born in Carpina, Pernambuco, Kempes moved to Rio de Janeiro at early age, and joined Canto do Rio at the age of 17 after impressing on a trial. He was promoted to the first team in 2001, and subsequently represented Nacional de Muriaé before joining Série A club Paraná in 2004.

After being rarely used, Kempes moved to Espírito Santo and played for Estrela do Norte and Vitória, winning the 2006 Campeonato Capixaba with the latter. Spells at Sertãozinho and 15 de Novembro de Campo Bom followed before signing a contract with Ceará on 11 July 2007.

In 2008 Kempes joined Caxias, and after being the club's top goalscorer in the year's Campeonato Gaúcho, signed for Ipatinga on loan; at the latter he scored his first top tier goal, in a 2–1 home win against Fluminense on 10 August. On 11 January 2009, he was presented at Criciúma.

On 4 June 2009, Kempes was transferred to Portuguesa, who bought 70% of his federative rights. He failed to impress during his spell at Lusa, and subsequently served loan spells at Novo Hamburgo, Ceará, América Mineiro and Cerezo Osaka before joining JEF United Chiba permanently on 1 February 2013.

Kempes returned to Brazil on 2 March 2015, signing for Joinville. On 16 December 2015, he joined state rivals Chapecoense.

== Personal life and death ==
Kempes was one of the 71 fatal victims from LaMia Airlines Flight 2933 crash, on 28 November 2016. The aircraft was taking the Chapecoense team to Medellin where they would play the first match of finals of 2016 Copa Sudamericana.

His son, João Gabriel Kempes, also pursued a career as a player, being in the youth ranks of SC Internacional.

== Career statistics ==
As of 27 November 2016

Appearances and goals by club, season and competition
Club	Season	League			State League		Cup		Continental		Other		Total	
Club	Season	Division	Apps	Goals	Apps	Goals	Apps	Goals	Apps	Goals	Apps	Goals	Apps	Goals
Paraná	2004	Série A	2	0	—		—		0	0	—		2	0
Estrela do Norte	2005	Série C	3	0	0	0	0	0	—		12 (Note: Appearance(s) in Copa Espírito Santo)	5	15	5
Vitória-ES	2006	Série C	6	1	11	4	—		—		—		17	5
15 de Novembro	2007	Gaúcho	—		15	8	—		—		—		15	8
Ceará	2007	Série B	0	0	—		—		—		—		0	0
Caxias	2008	Série C	0	0	13	5	—		—		—		13	5
Ipatinga	2008	Série A	14	1	—		—		—		—		14	1
Criciúma	2009	Série C	2	0	16	9	4	5	—		—		22	14
Portuguesa	2009	Série B	20	3	—		—		—		—		20	3
Portuguesa	2010	Série B	13	5	—		—		—		—		13	5
Portuguesa	2011	Série B	0	0	12	2	2	1	—		—		14	3
Portuguesa	2012	Série A	0	0	—		—		—		—		0	0
Portuguesa	2013	Série A	0	0	2	0	0	0	—		—		2	0
Portuguesa	Total		33	8	14	2	2	1	—		—		49	11
Novo Hamburgo (loan)	2010	Gaúcho	—		9	1	—		—		—		9	1
Ceará (loan)	2010	Série A	9	0	—		—		—		—		9	0
América Mineiro (loan)	2011	Série A	32	13	—		—		—		—		32	13
Cerezo Osaka (loan)	2012	J1 League	27	7	—		0	0	—		5 (Note: Appearance(s) in J.League Cup)	1	32	8
JEF United Chiba	2013	J2 League	38	22	—		0	0	—		1 (Note: Appearance(s) in J2 League play-offs)	0	39	22
JEF United Chiba	2014	J2 League	33	13	—		2 (Note: Two appearances in Emperor's Cup)	1	—		1	0	36	14
JEF United Chiba	Total		71	35	—		2	1	—		2	0	75	36
Joinville	2015	Série A	30	6	9	3	2	0	1 (Note: Appearance(s) in Copa Sudamericana)	0	—		42	9
Chapecoense	2016	Série A	26	9	18	5	5	2	4	0	—		53	16
Career total			255	83	105	38	17	9	5	0	19	6	398	136

== Honours ==
Estrela do Norte

- Copa Espírito Santo: 2005

Vitória-ES

- Campeonato Capixaba: 2006

Portuguesa

- Campeonato Brasileiro Série B: 2011

Chapecoense

- Campeonato Catarinense: 2016
- Copa Sudamericana: 2016 (posthumously)

Individual

- J2 League top goalscorer: 2013 (22 goals)
