= Gil (footballer, born September 1987) =

Brazilian footballer (1987–2016)

Personal information
- Full name: José Gildeixon Clemente de Paiva
- Date of birth: 3 September 1987
- Place of birth: Nova Cruz, Brazil
- Date of death: 28 November 2016 (aged 29)
- Place of death: La Unión, Colombia
- Height: 1.68 m (5 ft 6 in)
- Position: Defensive midfielder

Youth career
- 2005: Mogi Mirim

Senior career*
Years	Team	Apps	(Gls)
2005	Santa Cruz-RN	1	(0)
2006–2008	Mogi Mirim	28	(6)
2009	Guaratinguetá	16	(0)
2009	Vitória	7	(0)
2010	Santo André	37	(1)
2011	Ponte Preta	18	(0)
2011–2015	Coritiba	123	(1)
2015	→ Chapecoense (loan)	34	(3)
2016	Chapecoense	43	(1)
Total		307	(12)
- * Club domestic league appearances and goals

José Gildeixon Clemente de Paiva (3 September 1987 – 28 November 2016), commonly known as Gil, was a Brazilian footballer who last played for Chapecoense as a defensive midfielder.

Gil was one of the victims when LaMia Airlines Flight 2933 crashed on 28 November 2016.

== Club career ==
Gil started his career at Santa Cruz-RN. In 2005, he joined Mogi Mirim after impressing on a trial, and subsequently became an undisputed starter for the side. He then had spells at Guaratinguetá and Série A club Vitória in 2009, making his division debut for the latter on 16 July in a 1–1 away draw against Náutico.

Released by Vitória in December 2009, Gil signed for Santo André in Série B. Sparingly used by the club during the season, he moved to fellow second tier club Ponte Preta.

In April 2011, after impressing in the year's Campeonato Paulista, Gil agreed to a contract with Coritiba, but was only registered in June. He made his debut for the club on 1 July, replacing Tcheco in a 3–1 home victory against Ceará.

After several campaigns as a starter, Gil was loaned to fellow top tier side Chapecoense on 3 January 2015. He scored his first goal in the category on 30 May, but in a 1–3 loss at former club Ponte Preta.

Gil rescinded his contract with Coxa in December 2015, and signed for Chape permanently.

== Death ==
On 28 November 2016, whilst at the service of Chapecoense, Gil was among the fatalities of the LaMia Airlines Flight 2933 accident in the Colombian village of Cerro Gordo, La Unión, Antioquia.

== Career statistics ==
As of 27 November 2016

Club	Season	League			State League		Cup		Continental		Other		Total	
Club	Season	Division	Apps	Goals	Apps	Goals	Apps	Goals	Apps	Goals	Apps	Goals	Apps	Goals
Guaratinguetá	2009	Série B	0	0	16	0	—		—		—		16	0
Vitória	2009	Série A	7	0	—		—		—		—		2	0
Santo André	2010	Série B	16	0	21	1	—		—		—		37	1
Ponte Preta	2011	Série B	0	0	18	0	1	0	—		—		19	0
Coritiba	2011	Série A	11	0	—		—		—		—		11	0
Coritiba	2012	Série A	24	0	15	1	9	0	1 (Note: Appearance(s) in Copa Sudamericana)	0	—		49	1
Coritiba	2013	Série A	30	0	18	0	2	0	3	0	—		53	0
Coritiba	2014	Série A	15	0	10	0	5	0	—		—		30	0
Coritiba	Subtotal		80	0	43	1	16	0	4	0	—		143	1
Chapecoense	2015	Série A	23	1	11	2	3	0	4	0	—		41	3
Chapecoense	2016	Série A	26	0	17	1	5	0	7	1	—		55	2
Chapecoense	Subtotal		49	1	28	3	8	0	11	1	—		96	5
Career total			152	1	126	5	25	0	15	1	0	0	318	7

== Honours ==
Coritiba

- Campeonato Paranaense: 2012, 2013

Chapecoense

- Campeonato Catarinense: 2016
- Copa Sudamericana: 2016 (posthumously)
