= Gimenez (footballer) =

Brazilian footballer (1995–2016)

Personal information
- Full name: Guilherme Gimenez de Souza
- Date of birth: 18 June 1995
- Place of birth: Ribeirão Preto, Brazil
- Date of death: 28 November 2016 (aged 21)
- Place of death: La Unión, Colombia
- Height: 1.76 m (5 ft 9 1/2 in)
- Position: Right back

Youth career
- Olé Brasil
- Comercial-SP

Senior career*
| Years | Team | Apps | (Gls) |
| 2014 | Comercial-SP | 0 | (0) |
| 2015 | Botafogo-SP | 13 | (1) |
| 2015–2016 | Cianorte | 0 | (0) |
| 2015 | → Goiás (loan) | 23 | (0) |
| 2016 | → Chapecoense (loan) | 43 | (0) |
| Total | | 79 | (1) |
- * Club domestic league appearances and goals

Guilherme Gimenez de Souza (18 June 1995 – 28 November 2016), simply known as Gimenez, was a Brazilian footballer who last played for Chapecoense. Mainly a right back, he also played as a defensive midfielder.

Gimenez was one of the victims when LaMia Airlines Flight 2933 crashed on 28 November 2016.

== Club career ==
Born in Ribeirão Preto, São Paulo, Gimenez represented Olé Brasil and Comercial-SP as a youth. Promoted to the latter's first team in the middle of 2013, he made his senior debut on 21 July of that year by starting in a 0–0 Copa Paulista away draw against Independente de Limeira.

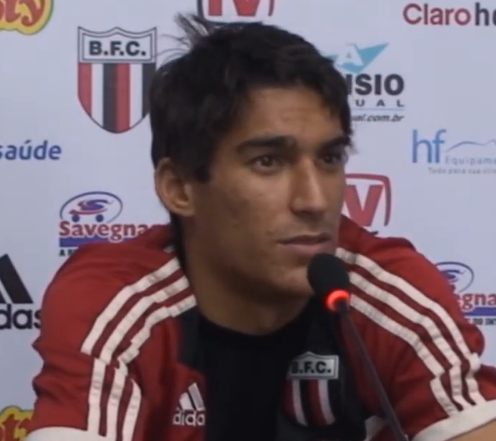
Gimenez as a player of Botafogo-SP in 2014

Gimenez also appeared twice on the bench for two 2014 Campeonato Paulista matches before rescinding his contract on 17 April 2014, due to unpaid wages. Eight days later, he signed a three-year contract with cross-town rivals Botafogo-SP.

Gimenez scored his first senior goal on 5 April 2015, netting the last in a 2–0 home win against São Paulo for the Paulistão championship. In June, he was bought by a group of businessmen and was signed by Série A club Goiás. He made his top tier debut on 18 July, being booked in a 1–2 away loss against Internacional.

Gimenez featured in 23 matches for the Esmeraldino, suffering relegation at the end of the campaign. On 17 December 2015, he signed a one-year contract with fellow top-level club Chapecoense.

== Death ==
On 28 November 2016, whilst at the service of Chapecoense, Gimenez was among the fatalities of the LaMia Airlines Flight 2933 accident in the Colombian village of Cerro Gordo, La Unión, Antioquia.

== Career statistics ==
As of 27 November 2016

| Club | Season | League | | | State League | | Cup | | Continental | | Other | | Total | |
| Club | Season | Division | Apps | Goals | Apps | Goals | Apps | Goals | Apps | Goals | Apps | Goals | Apps | Goals |
|---|---|---|---|---|---|---|---|---|---|---|---|---|---|---|
| Comercial-SP | 2013 | Paulista A2 | — | | 0 | 0 | — | | — | | 10 (Note: Appearance(s) in Copa Paulista) | 0 | 10 | 0 |
| Comercial-SP | 2014 | Paulista | — | | 0 | 0 | — | | — | | — | | 0 | 0 |
| Comercial-SP | Subtotal | | — | | 0 | 0 | — | | — | | 10 | 0 | 10 | 0 |
| Botafogo-SP | 2014 | Paulista | — | | 0 | 0 | — | | — | | 19 | 0 | 19 | 0 |
| Botafogo-SP | 2015 | Série D | 0 | 0 | 13 | 1 | — | | — | | — | | 13 | 1 |
| Botafogo-SP | Subtotal | | 0 | 0 | 13 | 1 | — | | — | | 19 | 0 | 32 | 1 |
| Goiás | 2015 | Série A | 23 | 0 | — | | 0 | 0 | 1 (Note: Appearance(s) in Copa Sudamericana) | 0 | — | | 24 | 0 |
| Chapecoense | 2016 | Série A | 31 | 0 | 12 | 0 | 3 | 0 | 5 | 0 | — | | 51 | 0 |
| Career total | | | 54 | 0 | 25 | 1 | 3 | 0 | 6 | 0 | 29 | 0 | 117 | 1 |

== Honours ==
Chapecoense

- Campeonato Catarinense: 2016
- Copa Sudamericana: 2016 (posthumously)
