= Ananias (footballer) =

Brazilian footballer (1989–2016)

Personal information
- Full name: Ananias Eloi Castro Monteiro
- Date of birth: 20 January 1989
- Place of birth: São Luís, Brazil
- Date of death: 28 November 2016 (aged 27)
- Place of death: La Unión, Colombia
- Height: 1.69 m (5 ft 6 1/2 in)
- Position: Attacking midfielder

Youth career
- 2004–2008: Bahia

Senior career*
Years	Team	Apps	(Gls)
2008–2012	Bahia	87	(8)
2011–2012	→ Portuguesa (loan)	83	(20)
2013–2015	Cruzeiro	3	(0)
2013	→ Palmeiras (loan)	20	(0)
2014	→ Sport Recife (loan)	30	(2)
2015	→ Chapecoense (loan)	48	(10)
2016	Chapecoense	35	(4)
Total		306	(44)
- * Club domestic league appearances and goals

Ananias Eloi Castro Monteiro (20 January 1989 – 28 November 2016), known as Ananias, was a Brazilian footballer who last played as an attacking midfielder for Chapecoense.

Ananias was one of the victims when LaMia Airlines Flight 2933 crashed on 28 November 2016.

== Career ==
Born in São Luís, Maranhão, Ananias graduated from Bahia's youth categories, and made his professional debut in 2008 Série B. In 2011, he was loaned to Portuguesa, in a two-year deal.

After good performances at the club, and with Lusa being compared to Barcelona, Ananias was called Ananiesta (compared to Andrés Iniesta) by the fans. In April 2012, Portuguesa bought half of his rights from Bahia.

On 10 January 2013 Ananias moved to Cruzeiro, with Souza moving in the opposite direction. On 29 May, however, he was loaned to Palmeiras until the end of the year.

After achieving promotion with Verdão, Ananias was subsequently loaned to Sport Recife (also scoring the first official goal of Allianz Parque in a 2–0 away win against former club Palmeiras on 19 November 2014) and Chapecoense.

On 11 December 2015, Ananias signed a permanent contract with Chape. The following 2 November, he scored the equalizer in a 1–1 draw at San Lorenzo for the year's Copa Sudamericana, which would later ensure his team in the finals through the away goals rule.

== Death ==
On 28 November 2016, whilst at the service of Chapecoense, Ananias was among the fatalities of the LaMia Airlines Flight 2933 accident in the Colombian village of Cerro Gordo, La Unión, Antioquia.

== Career statistics ==
As of 27 November 2016

Club	Season	League			State League		Cup		Continental		Other		Total	
Club	Season	Division	Apps	Goals	Apps	Goals	Apps	Goals	Apps	Goals	Apps	Goals	Apps	Goals
Bahia	2008	Série B	6	1	—		0	0	—		—		6	1
Bahia	2009	Série B	19	2	20	2	0	0	—		—		39	4
Bahia	2010	Série B	22	1	17	2	3	0	—		—		42	3
Bahia	2011	Série A	0	0	3	0	1	0	—		—		4	0
Bahia	Subtotal		47	4	40	4	4	0	—		—		91	8
Portuguesa	2011	Série B	30	12	8	1	—		—		—		38	13
Portuguesa	2012	Série A	31	4	14	3	5	1	—		—		50	8
Portuguesa	Subtotal		61	16	22	4	5	1	—		—		88	21
Cruzeiro	2013	Série A	0	0	3	0	0	0	—		—		3	0
Palmeiras (loan)	2013	Série B	20	0	—		1	0	—		—		21	0
Sport (loan)	2014	Série A	23	2	7	0	2	3	1 (Note: Appearance(s) in Copa Sudamericana)	0	9 (Note: Appearance(s) in Copa do Nordeste)	1	42	6
Chapecoense	2015	Série A	30	3	18	7	1	0	2	0	—		51	10
Chapecoense	2016	Série A	17	2	18	2	2	0	4	2	—		41	6
Chapecoense	Subtotal		47	5	36	9	3	0	6	2	—		92	16
Career total			198	27	108	17	15	4	7	2	9	1	337	55

== Honours ==
Portuguesa

- Campeonato Brasileiro Série B: 2011

Palmeiras

- Campeonato Brasileiro Série B: 2013

Sport Recife

- Copa do Nordeste: 2014
- Campeonato Pernambucano: 2014

Chapecoense

- Campeonato Catarinense: 2016
- Copa Sudamericana: 2016 (posthumously)
