= Ailton Canela =

Brazilian footballer (1994–2016)

Personal information
- Full name: Ailton Cesar Junior Alves da Silva
- Date of birth: 18 November 1994
- Place of birth: Matão, Brazil
- Date of death: 28 November 2016 (aged 22)
- Place of death: La Unión, Colombia
- Height: 1.80 m (5 ft 11 in)
- Position: Forward

Youth career
- 2010–2012: Inter de Bebedouro

Senior career*
Years	Team	Apps	(Gls)
2012	Inter de Bebedouro	1	(0)
2013	Vitória-ES	7	(0)
2013–2015	Monte Azul	23	(2)
2014	→ Olímpia (loan)	18	(2)
2015–2016	Botafogo-SP	9	(2)
2016	Cianorte	0	(0)
2016	→ Chapecoense (loan)	4	(0)
Total		62	(6)
- * Club domestic league appearances and goals

Ailton Cesar Junior Alves da Silva (18 November 1994 – 28 November 2016), known as Ailton Canela or simply Canela, was a Brazilian footballer who played for Chapecoense.

Canela was one of the 71 people who died in LaMia Airlines Flight 2933 accident, including 18 of his teammates.

== Club career ==
Canela was born in Matão, São Paulo, and joined Internacional de Bebedouro through a youth programme held in his hometown, in 2010. He made his senior debut on 29 February 2012, coming on as a substitute in a 1–0 Campeonato Paulista Série A2 away win against Osvaldo Cruz.

Canela signed for Vitória-ES ahead of the 2013 season. In the middle of the year, however, he moved to Monte Azul to play in the year's Copa Paulista.

In July 2014, Canela was loaned to Olímpia until the end of the year. Returning in the following January, he became a starter before joining Botafogo-SP on 30 June 2015.

Canela became a starter for Bota during the end of the campaign, scoring two goals as his side achieved promotion as champions. On 12 January 2016, after failing to agree new terms, he signed a pre-contract with Cianorte.

On 9 June 2016, Canela was loaned to Série A club Chapecoense until December. He made his debut in the category on 4 August, replacing Hyoran in a 1–1 home draw against Palmeiras.

== Death ==
On 28 November 2016, when Chapecoense were en route to the first leg of the 2016 Copa Sudamericana Finals to play against Atlético Nacional, Canela was among the fatalities of the LaMia Airlines Flight 2933 accident in the Colombian village of Cerro Gordo, La Unión, Antioquia.

== Club statistics ==
As of 27 November 2016

Club	Season	League			State League		Cup		Continental		Other		Total	
Club	Season	Division	Apps	Goals	Apps	Goals	Apps	Goals	Apps	Goals	Apps	Goals	Apps	Goals
Inter de Bebedouro	2012	Paulista A3	—		1	0	—		—		—		1	0
Vitória-ES	2013	Capixaba	—		7	0	—		—		—		7	0
Monte Azul	2013	Paulista A2	—		—		—		—		9 (Note: Appearance(s) in Copa Paulista)	1	9	1
Monte Azul	2014	Paulista A2	—		6	0	—		—		—		6	0
Monte Azul	2015	Paulista A2	—		17	2	—		—		—		17	2
Monte Azul	Total		—		23	2	—		—		9	1	32	3
Olímpia (loan)	2014	Paulista 2ª Divisão	—		18	2	—		—		—		18	2
Botafogo-SP	2015	Série D	9	2	—		—		—		—		9	2
Chapecoense	2016	Série A	4	0	—		0	0	2 (Note: Appearance(s) in Copa Sudamericana)	0	—		6	0
Career total			13	2	49	4	0	0	2	0	9	1	73	7

== Honours ==
Botafogo-SP

- Campeonato Brasileiro Série D: 2015

Chapecoense

- Copa Sudamericana: 2016 (posthumously)
