= Rafael Henzel =

Brazilian radio broadcaster (1973–2019)

- Born: Rafael Henzel Valmorbida; 25 August 1973; São Leopoldo, Rio Grande do Sul, Brazil
- Died: 26 March 2019 (aged 45); Chapecó, Santa Catarina, Brazil
- Occupation(s): Journalist, announcer

Rafael Henzel Valmorbida (25 August 1973 – 26 March 2019) was a Brazilian radio broadcaster who worked at Radio Oeste Capital FM, in the city of Chapecó, Santa Catarina.

== Biography ==
Born in São Leopoldo, Rio Grande do Sul, Rafael began his career as a radio broadcaster at the age of fifteen at Radio Oeste Capital FM, in the city of Chapecó, Santa Catarina, passing through several radio stations in the city until he made his television debut in 1993 as a reporter for RCE TV, located in Xanxerê.

He was internationally known for being the only journalist who survived the accident of LaMia Flight 2933, which occurred on 28 November 2016. Henzel was one of six survivors of the air tragedy whose plane crashed seventeen kilometers from José María Córdova Airport, near Medellín.

After staying in the ICU for ten days and twenty days in a hospital in the city of Medellin, Rafael returned to Chapecó on December 13, 2016, along with Alan Ruschel, one of the survivors of the accident. Despite the accident, the announcer expressed interest in returning to work to retransmit the historic match between Chapecoense and Zulia, in the 2017 Copa Libertadores in Venezuela.

=== Death ===
He died on 26 March 2019, after suffering a massive heart attack while playing a football match. "Henzel was reunited with friends for a football match when he became ill. He was taken to West Regional Hospital still alive, but he did not resist sudden illness." He was buried in the Garden of Eden cemetery in Chapecó.
