= Josimar (footballer, born 1986) =

Brazilian footballer (1986–2016)

Personal information
- Full name: Josimar Rosado da Silva Tavares
- Date of birth: 18 August 1986
- Place of birth: Pelotas, Brazil
- Date of death: 28 November 2016 (aged 30)
- Place of death: La Unión, Colombia
- Height: 1.81 m (5 ft 11 in)
- Position: Defensive midfielder

Youth career
- 2003–2007: Internacional

Senior career*
Years	Team	Apps	(Gls)
2007–2015	Internacional	48	(2)
2008	→ Brasil de Pelotas (loan)	12	(0)
2008	→ Fortaleza (loan)	5	(1)
2009	→ Al-Watani (loan)	15	(0)
2010–2011	→ Ponte Preta (loan)	78	(3)
2014	→ Palmeiras (loan)	11	(0)
2015	→ Ponte Preta (loan)	31	(1)
2016	Chapecoense	38	(0)
Total		248	(7)
- * Club domestic league appearances and goals

Josimar Rosado da Silva Tavares (18 August 1986 – 28 November 2016), simply known as Josimar, was a Brazilian footballer who last played for Chapecoense as a defensive midfielder.

Josimar was one of the victims when LaMia Airlines Flight 2933 crashed on 28 November 2016.

== Club career ==
Born in Pelotas, Rio Grande do Sul, Josimar joined Internacional's youth setup in 2003 at the age of 16. On 21 January 2007 he made his first team debut, coming on as a late substitute in a 0–0 Campeonato Gaúcho home draw against Novo Hamburgo.

Rarely used by Inter, Josimar spent time on loan at Brasil de Pelotas, Fortaleza, Al-Watani and Ponte Preta, establishing himself as a starter with the latter and contributing with three goals in 24 league appearances during their promotion campaign. He scored his first professional goal on 24 October 2008 while still at Fortaleza, netting his team's first in a 2–2 home draw against CRB.

After returning from his loan at Ponte, Josimar renewed his contract with Colorado in December 2011, until 2015. He scored his first top flight goal on 2 September 2012, netting the second in a 4–1 home routing of Flamengo.

On 5 February 2014 Josimar signed a one-year loan contract with Palmeiras, also in the main category. After failing to impress and being heavily criticized by the supporters, he returned to Ponte on 24 September.

On 17 December 2015, Josimar signed a permanent deal with Chapecoense, after his contract with Inter expired. He immediately became an undisputed starter at the club.

== Death ==
On 28 November 2016, whilst at the service of Chapecoense, Josimar was among the fatalities of the LaMia Airlines Flight 2933 accident in the Colombian village of Cerro Gordo, La Unión, Antioquia.

== Career statistics ==
As of 24 November 2016

Club	Season	League			State League		Cup		Continental		Other		Total	
Club	Season	Division	Apps	Goals	Apps	Goals	Apps	Goals	Apps	Goals	Apps	Goals	Apps	Goals
Internacional	2007	Série A	0	0	2	0	—		—		—		2	0
Internacional	2012	Série A	15	1	5	0	—		0	0	—		20	1
Internacional	2013	Série A	22	0	13	1	5	0	—		—		40	1
Internacional	2014	Série A	0	0	1	0	0	0	—		—		1	0
Internacional	Subtotal		37	1	21	1	5	0	0	0	—		63	2
Brasil de Pelotas (loan)	2008	Série C	0	0	12	0	—		—		—		12	0
Fortaleza (loan)	2008	Série B	5	1	—		—		—		—		5	1
Al-Watani (loan)	2008–09	Saudi Professional League	15	0	—		—		—		—		15	0
Ponte Preta (loan)	2010	Série B	33	0	—		—		—		—		33	0
Ponte Preta (loan)	2011	Série B	24	3	21	0	1	0	—		—		46	3
Ponte Preta (loan)	Subtotal		57	3	21	0	1	0	—		—		79	3
Palmeiras (loan)	2014	Série A	10	0	1	0	3	0	—		—		14	0
Ponte Preta (loan)	2015	Série A	19	0	12	1	3	0	0	0	—		34	1
Chapecoense	2016	Série A	27	0	11	0	5	1	7 (Note: Appearance(s) in Copa Sudamericana)	0	—		50	1
Career total			170	5	78	2	17	1	7	0	0	0	272	8

== Honours ==
Internacional

- Campeonato Gaúcho: 2012, 2013

Chapecoense

- Campeonato Catarinense: 2016
- Copa Sudamericana: 2016 (posthumously)
