= LaMia =

Venezuelan-Bolivian charter airline

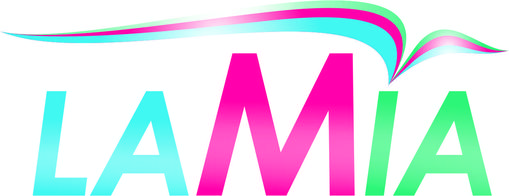
IATA	ICAO	Call sign
-	LMI	LAMIA
- Founded: 2009 (Venezuela); August 2014 (Bolivia)
- Commenced operations: January 2016
- Ceased operations: December 1, 2016 (following LaMia Flight 2933 crash)
- Hubs: Viru Viru International Airport
- Fleet size: 2
- Headquarters: Santa Cruz de la Sierra, Bolivia
- Key people: Gustavo Vargas Gamboa (Owner)
- Employees: 8
- Website: www.lamiacorp.com

LaMia Corporation S.R.L., operating as LaMia (short for Línea Aérea Mérida Internacional de Aviación), was a Bolivian charter airline headquartered in Santa Cruz de la Sierra, as an EcoJet subsidiary. It had its origins from the failed Venezuelan airline of the same name. Founded in 2015, LaMia operated three Avro RJ85 as of November 2016. The airline received international attention when one of its aircraft crashed in November 2016, killing many members of Brazilian football club Chapecoense. In the aftermath, LaMia's air operator's certificate was suspended by the Bolivian civil aviation authority.

== History ==
=== LaMia (Venezuela) ===
Bolivian airline LaMia originated in the failed Venezuelan airline of the same name, which was founded as LAMIA, C.A. in 2009 by Spanish businessman Ricardo Albacete. The name chosen, styled as LaMia, was the acronym of Línea Aérea Mérida Internacional de Aviación and literally means "my airline". It took delivery of an ATR 72-500 wet leased from Swiftair and intended to begin service out of Mérida, Venezuela, its original base. However, the company failed to secure its own air operator's certificate and folded in October 2010 after only operating since August, with Swiftair taking back the aircraft. After its permits expired, LaMia attempted a relaunch in 2011 by taking a single Avro RJ85 and focusing on domestic flights, although none operated from Mérida. Having had its efforts in Mérida thwarted twice, the airline moved to the state of Nueva Esparta: the airline changed the M in its name to mean Margarita and planned to relaunch in early 2014 operating out of Porlamar. A November 2013 demonstration flight featured the state's governor, Carlos Mata Figueroa, and Albacete gave a speech praising Venezuelan president Nicolás Maduro; this incarnation also fell through amidst the country's worsening economic crisis. In 2014, LaMia even placed its planes in Trujillo, Trujillo, apparently with the intent of operating flights from Valera to Caracas, but these efforts never got off the ground; the airline failed to receive certification from the National Institute of Civil Aviation (INAC), and the planes were only in Venezuela for a year.

=== LaMia (Bolivia) ===
With their repeated failures in two Venezuelan states, the Venezuelan owners opted to lease the three RJ85s they had to Bolivian entrepreneurs; in a cost-cutting move, the Bolivian company adopted the name already painted on the aircraft: LaMia. The two aircraft not in service at the time of the crash still bore the Venezuelan airline's website, lamia.com.ve, on their sides. In November 2015, Bolivian airline LaMia—a legally distinct company incorporated as LAMIA Corporation SRL—set up offices in a house in Santa Cruz de la Sierra, and received permission from its national civil aviation authority to begin offering domestic charter flights there; such operations began in January 2016 under the new company's "indefinite" operating certificate. Its fleet included three RJ85 aircraft with capacity for 95 passengers, though two never flew and the airline never offered commercial service. At the time, operations coordinator Mario Pacheco said that resource extraction and mining companies, travel agencies and soccer teams were among their target clients. Indeed, soccer teams were among the most faithful clients, and the airline had flown the Argentina, Bolivia and Venezuela national teams as well as the Colombian Atlético Nacional, the Paraguayan Club Olimpia and local sides Oriente Petrolero, The Strongest and Club Blooming. Additionally, the Bolivian Ministry of Mining and Metallurgy was a client of the airline.

In the aftermath of the crash of Flight 2933, DGAC, Bolivia's aviation authority, suspended LaMia's operating license, and the Bolivian Labor Ministry stated that LaMia was not a registered business with the government. Bolivian law requires all employers to be registered with the Labor Ministry, which maintains the Obligatory Registry of Businesses.

== Corporate affairs ==
LaMia was headquartered in the Bolivian city of Santa Cruz de la Sierra. It was owned by Gustavo Vargas Gamboa; its other owner, Miguel Alejandro Quiroga Murakami, died in the Flight 2933 accident. As of 30 November 2016, the airline had eight employees.

Albacete, the owner of the Venezuelan airline that owns the Bolivian airline's fleet, told press from Spain that while he was emotionally affected by the disaster, he was not involved in the Bolivian airline's operations.

On 6 December, Vargas Gamboa was arrested along with two other LaMia employees by the local branch of the attorney general's office. He claimed that he had presented his resignation from the company three days before the crash, on 25 November. That same day, the civil aviation authority hauled documents and papers from the airline's Santa Cruz headquarters. The other owner, Miguel Quiroga, had an arrest warrant issued by the Bolivian government for leaving the Bolivian Air Force earlier than had been stipulated, breaking the terms of his pilot training. The Air Force found that Quiroga and four other trained pilots had not provided sufficient justification for leaving before they had completed their required years of military service.

In May 2017, a CNN report revealed that LaMia's insurance policy with Bolivian insurer Bisa had lapsed beginning in October 2016 for nonpayment; while said policy did not cover flights to Colombia, which the insurer included as part of a geographical exclusion clause along with several African countries, as well as Peru, Afghanistan, Syria and Iraq, the airline managed to get permission to fly to Colombia on at least eight occasions.

== Fleet ==
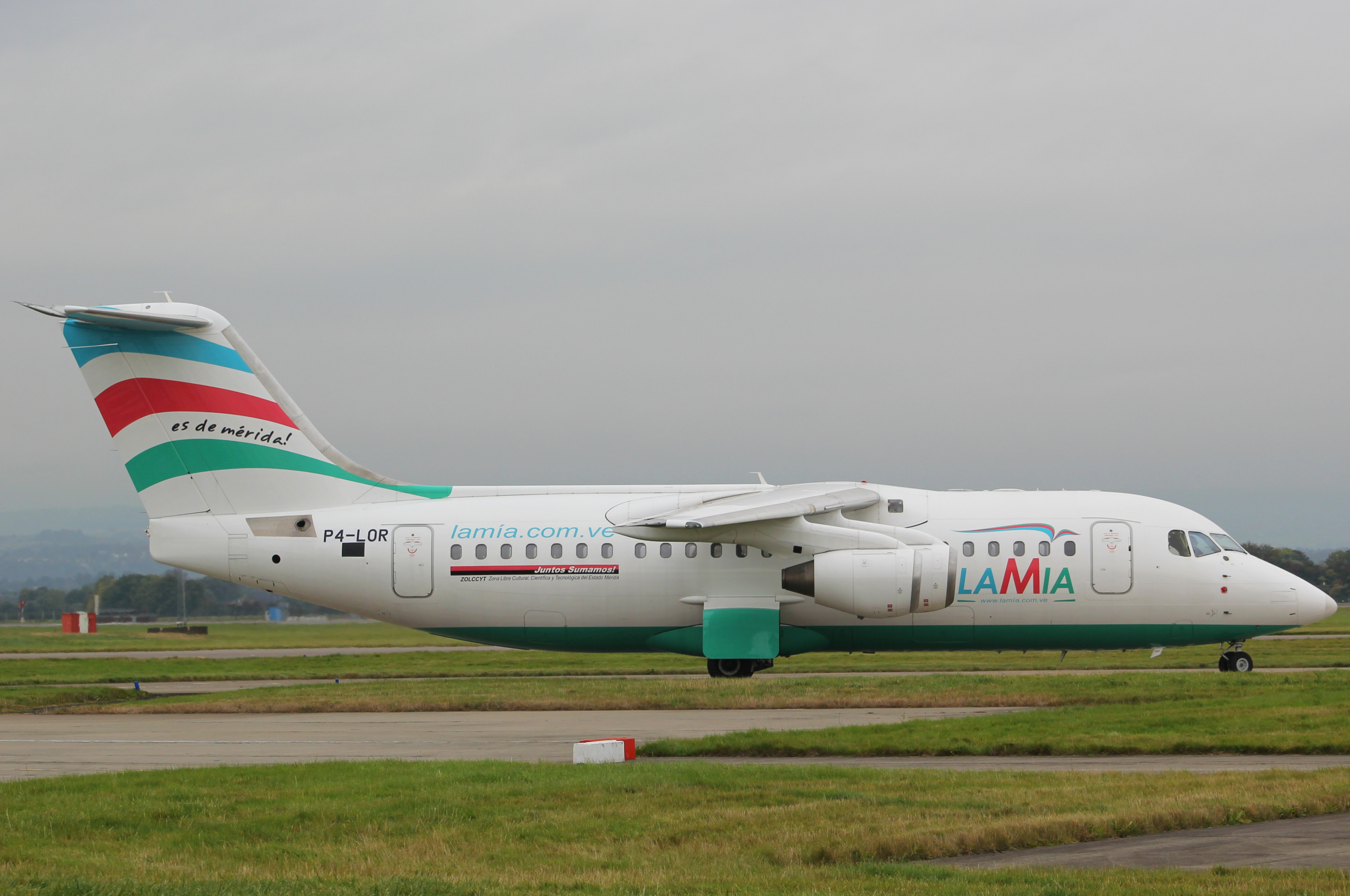
A LaMia Avro RJ85 (registered P4-LOR) at Glasgow Airport in 2013, operating for the Venezuelan LaMia. The aircraft was re-registered as CP-2933 in 2015 and was destroyed in the Flight 2933 accident.

=== Final fleet ===
As of November 30, 2016, after the destruction of CP-2933, the remaining LaMia fleet consisted of the following:

LaMia fleet
Aircraft	In Service	Orders	Passengers	Notes
Avro RJ85	2	—	95	Both stored at Cochabamba and Valera.
Total	2	—		

The multinational investigative commission opted on December 7 to seize the other two aircraft as part of its investigation. The Bolivian Air Force also revealed that it had filed a lawsuit for maintenance on the downed aircraft carried out by the Air Force in 2014, but for which the airline never paid.

=== Retired fleet ===
The airline formerly operated the following for the Venezuelan LaMia:

- 1 further Avro RJ85 stored at Norwich Airport
- 1 ATR 72-500 wet leased from Swiftair

== Accidents and incidents ==
=== Flight 2933 ===
On the night of November 28, 2016 at approximately 10:33 pm (Bogotá time), LaMia Flight 2933, which carried 77 passengers mostly composed of Brazilian football squad Chapecoense, departed Santa Cruz de la Sierra (Bolivia) heading towards Medellín (Colombia) when the aircraft crashed in the countryside just outside La Unión in Antioquía department. Out of the 77 passengers, 71 were officially confirmed dead. Miguel Quiroga, one of the flight crew of the downed aircraft, was also a part owner of the airline. The crash exposed gaps in safety at the airline. LaMia did not meet IATA regulations that would have permitted it to handle the aftermath of the crash; instead, the airline had to borrow 100 coffins, requiring Avianca, the Colombian flag carrier, and the Colombian and Brazilian governments to step in and pick up the slack. The Bolivian government proceeded to suspend LaMia's license on 1 December.

== See also ==
- List of defunct airlines of Bolivia
