= Victorino Chermont =

Brazilian sports journalist (1973–2016)

- Born: 24 April 1973; Rio de Janeiro, Brazil
- Died: 28 November 2016 (aged 43); La Unión, Colombia
- Occupation: Journalist

Victorino Chermont (24 April 1973 in Rio de Janeiro – 28 November 2016 in La Unión) was a Brazilian sports journalist and television presenter.

== Biography ==
Victorino Chermont worked for Rede Bandeirantes in Rádio Globo, SporTV and Fox Sports Brazil. On this channel he presented A Última Palavra (The Final Saying).

He received several awards including the Botequim Prize for best sports journalist in 2012.

Chermont died in the crash of LaMia Airlines Flight 2933 on 28 November 2016 while covering the Associação Chapecoense de Futebol team for Fox Sports.
