= Plus 55 =

Plus 55, active for 18 months starting in 2016, was one of the first publications to translate Brazilian news into English. It was launched by Gustavo Riberio and Marcelo Anache in 2016 with the subcategories Power, Money, Life, Ideas and Opinion. Its name is a reference to the Brazilian country code, which is +55. The website began as a blog written in French, and later changed to English language coverage.

== Notable stories ==
While Plus 55 covered many headlines in Brazilian news, it became internationally recognized for specific coverage.

=== Chapecoense ===
Time magazine interviewed Plus 55 after the Chapecoense accident.
