= Sérgio Manoel (footballer, born 1989) =

Brazilian footballer (1989–2016)

Personal information
- Full name: Sérgio Manoel Barbosa Santos
- Date of birth: 8 September 1989
- Place of birth: Xique-Xique, Brazil
- Date of death: 28 November 2016 (aged 27)
- Place of death: La Unión, Colombia
- Height: 1.77 m (5 ft 10 in)
- Position: Defensive midfielder

Youth career
- 2005–2008: Nacional-SP

Senior career*
Years	Team	Apps	(Gls)
2008–2009	Nacional-SP	6	(0)
2009	Atlético Araçatuba	31	(3)
2010	Batatais	8	(0)
2011	Rio Preto	20	(4)
2011–2016	Mirassol	28	(3)
2012–2014	→ Coritiba (loan)	27	(0)
2015	→ Atlético Goianiense (loan)	16	(0)
2015	→ Paysandu (loan)	4	(0)
2016	→ Água Santa (loan)	14	(0)
2016	→ Chapecoense (loan)	18	(2)
Total		172	(12)
- * Club domestic league appearances and goals

Sérgio Manoel Barbosa Santos (8 September 1989 – 28 November 2016), known as Sérgio Manoel, was a Brazilian footballer who last played as a defensive midfielder for Chapecoense.

Sérgio Manoel was one of the victims when LaMia Airlines Flight 2933 crashed on 28 November 2016.

== Club career ==
Sérgio Manoel was born in Xique-Xique, Bahia, but was raised in São Paulo. Joining Nacional-SP's youth setup in 2005, he made his senior debut in 2008 during the year's Copa Paulista.

On 7 April 2009, Sérgio Manoel joined Atlético Araçatuba, and became an undisputed starter for the side. The following year he moved to Batatais, but his spell was hampered by injuries.

In June 2011, after a period at Rio Preto, Sérgio Manoel signed for Série D side Mirassol. A regular starter for the side, he moved to Coritiba on 20 April 2012.

Sérgio Manoel made his Série A debut on 20 May 2012, coming on as a half-time substitute for Willian Farias in a 0–2 away loss against Internacional. He would struggle severely with injuries in the following campaigns, however.

On 28 January 2015, Sérgio Manoel agreed to a contract with Atlético Goianiense. Released on 30 July, he was announced at Goiás on 5 August, but the deal was declared void the following day after the highly negative response from the supporters.

Sérgio Manoel joined Paysandu on 10 September 2015, remaining at the side until the end of the year. On 11 December he signed for Água Santa, and impressed enough to secure a move to Chapecoense in the top tier on the following 19 May.

Sérgio Manoel scored his first goal in the main category of Brazilian football on 19 June 2016, netting the first in a 2–1 away win against Vitória.

== Death ==
On 28 November 2016, whilst at the service of Chapecoense, Sérgio Manoel was among the fatalities of the LaMia Airlines Flight 2933 accident in the Colombian village of Cerro Gordo, La Unión, Antioquia.

== Club statistics ==
As of 27 November 2016

Club	Season	League			State League		Cup		Continental		Other		Total	
Club	Season	Division	Apps	Goals	Apps	Goals	Apps	Goals	Apps	Goals	Apps	Goals	Apps	Goals
Nacional-SP	2008	Paulista A3	—		0	0	—		—		13 (Note: Appearance(s) in Copa Paulista)	3	13	3
Nacional-SP	2009	Paulista A3	—		6	0	—		—		—		6	0
Nacional-SP	Total		—		6	0	—		—		13	3	19	3
Atlético Araçatuba	2009	Paulista 2ª Divisão	—		31	3	—		—		—		31	3
Batatais	2010	Paulista A3	—		8	0	—		—		—		8	0
Rio Preto	2011	Paulista A2	—		20	4	—		—		—		20	4
Mirassol	2011	Série D	10	1	—		—		—		—		10	1
Mirassol	2012	Série D	—		18	2	—		—		—		18	2
Mirassol	Total		10	1	18	2	—		—		—		28	3
Coritiba	2012	Série A	9	0	—		7	0	0	0	—		16	0
Coritiba	2013	Série A	4	0	4	0	2	0	—		—		10	0
Coritiba	2014	Série A	10	0	0	0	0	0	—		—		10	0
Coritiba	Total		23	0	4	0	9	0	0	0	—		36	0
Atlético Goianiense	2015	Série B	5	0	11	0	2	0	—		—		18	0
Paysandu	2015	Série B	4	0	—		—		—		—		4	0
Água Santa	2016	Paulista	—		14	0	—		—		—		14	0
Chapecoense	2016	Série A	18	2	—		1	0	7 (Note: Appearance(s) in Copa Sudamericana)	0	—		26	2
Career total			60	3	112	9	12	0	7	0	13	3	204	15

== Honours ==
Chapecoense

- Copa Sudamericana: 2016 (posthumously)
