= Paulo Julio Clement =

Brazilian sports journalist (1964–2016)

- Born: Paulo Julio Moraes Clement; 21 December 1964; Rio de Janeiro, Brazil
- Died: 28 November 2016 (aged 51); La Unión, Colombia
- Occupations: Journalist, commentator
- Years active: 1987–2016
- Spouse: Flávia Caldeira (m. 1998)
- Children: 1

Paulo Julio "PJ" Moraes Clement (21 December 1964 – 28 November 2016) was a Brazilian sports commentator and journalist who last worked for Fox Sports Brasil.

== Biography ==
Clement was born in the state of Rio de Janeiro. He began working professionally as a reporter for Jornal do Brasil in 1987. He also worked for O Dia in 1989. From 1991 to 2001, he worked for the Rio newspaper O Globo. He also worked as a radio sports commentator for Rádio Globo in São Paulo. He later worked for Fox Sports Brasil from 2012 to his death in 2016.

Clement married Flávia Caldeira in 1998. Their son, Theo, was born on 24 August 2009.

Clement died on 28 November 2016 onboard LaMia Flight 2933 which crashed in La Unión, Antioquia, Colombia. He was 51.
