= Delfim Peixoto =

Brazilian football administrator & politician (1941–2016)

Vice-president of the Brazilian Football Confederation
- In office 2015–2016

President of the Federação Catarinense de Futebol
- In office 1985–2016

Deputy of the Legislative Assembly of Santa Catarina
- In office 1971–1983

Personal details
- Born: 3 January 1941 Itajaí, Santa Catarina, Brazil
- Died: 28 November 2016 (aged 75) La Unión, Antioquia, Colombia
- Education: University of Santa Catarina (Law)
- Profession: Lawyer

Delfim de Pádua Peixoto Filho (3 January 1941 – 28 November 2016), known as Delfim Peixoto, was a Brazilian politician and football administrator who died as a result of the crash of LaMia Airlines Flight 2933. At the time of his death he was a vice president of the Brazilian Football Confederation (CBF) and president of the Federação Catarinense de Futebol (FCF), a position he had held since 1985.

== Early life and education ==
Delfim Peixoto was born in 1941 in Itajaí in the southern Brazilian state of Santa Catarina. He studied law at the University of Santa Catarina's law school. While a student, Delfim Peixoto was active in student politics, serving as secretary of the Santa Catarina Union of Students and as a member of the National Union of Students.

Delfim Peixoto later lectured in criminal law and legal practice at the Universidade do Vale do Itajaí.

== Public life ==
As a member of the Brazilian Communist Party (PCB), he was elected as a councillor in the Itajaí municipal elections in 1965.

Delfim Peixoto was elected three times – in 1970, 1974 and 1978 – as a deputy to the Legislative Assembly of Santa Catarina, initially representing the Brazilian Democratic Movement (MDB) and later the Brazilian Democratic Movement Party (PMDB).

In 1983, he joined the Federação Catarinense de Futebol (FCF) as vice president. He became FCF president two years later. In 2015, Delfim was elected a vice president of the Brazilian Football Confederation (CBF).

== Death ==
Delfim was flying to the 2016 Copa Sudamericana Finals first leg in Medellín when LaMia Airlines Flight 2933 crashed, killing him and 70 other passengers including most of the Associação Chapecoense de Futebol team.
