= Dener (footballer, born 1991) =

Brazilian footballer (1991–2016)

Personal information
- Full name: Dener Assunção Braz
- Date of birth: 28 June 1991
- Place of birth: Bagé, Brazil
- Date of death: 28 November 2016 (aged 25)
- Place of death: La Unión, Colombia
- Height: 1.75 m (5 ft 9 in)
- Position: Left back

Youth career
- 2009–2011: Grêmio

Senior career*
Years	Team	Apps	(Gls)
2010–2014	Grêmio	4	(0)
2012	→ Veranópolis (loan)	16	(0)
2012	→ Vitória (loan)	2	(0)
2012–2013	→ Caxias (loan)	32	(0)
2014	Ituano	18	(0)
2014–2016	Coritiba	12	(1)
2015	→ Chapecoense (loan)	54	(1)
2016	Chapecoense	38	(3)
Total		186	(5)
- * Club domestic league appearances and goals

Dener Assunção Braz (28 June 1991 – 28 November 2016), simply known as Dener, was a Brazilian footballer who last played as a left back for Chapecoense.

Dener was one of the victims when LaMia Airlines Flight 2933 crashed on 28 November 2016.

== Club career ==
Born in Bagé, Rio Grande do Sul, Dener finished his youth formation with Grêmio. He made his first team debut on 20 January 2011, coming on as a substitute in a 1–1 Campeonato Gaúcho away draw against Ypiranga.

After loan stints at Veranópolis, Vitória and Caxias, Dener signed a permanent one-year deal with Ituano on 13 January 2014. An undisputed starter, he only missed one match in the club's Campeonato Paulista winning campaign.

On 17 April 2014, Dener joined Coritiba. He made his Série A debut on 11 May, replacing Carlinhos in a 0–1 home loss against Sport Club do Recife, and scored his first professional goal late in the month in a 3–0 home win against Goiás.

On 23 December 2014, Dener was loaned to fellow top tier club Chapecoense. An ever-present figure during the season, he signed a permanent three-year contract with the club on 13 January 2016.

== Death ==
On 28 November 2016, whilst at the service of Chapecoense, Dener was among the fatalities of the LaMia Airlines Flight 2933 accident in the Colombian village of Cerro Gordo, La Unión, Antioquia.

== Career statistics ==
As of 27 November 2016

Club	Season	League			State League		Cup		Continental		Other		Total	
Club	Season	Division	Apps	Goals	Apps	Goals	Apps	Goals	Apps	Goals	Apps	Goals	Apps	Goals
Grêmio	2010	Série A	0	0	0	0	0	0	—		—		0	0
Grêmio	2011	Série A	0	0	4	0	0	0	—		—		4	0
Grêmio	2012	Série A	0	0	0	0	1	0	—		—		1	0
Grêmio	Subtotal		0	0	4	0	1	0	—		—		5	0
Veranópolis (loan)	2012	Gaúcho	—		16	0	—		—		—		16	0
Vitória (loan)	2012	Série B	2	0	—		—		—		—		2	0
Caxias (loan)	2012	Série C	3	0	—		—		—		—		3	0
Caxias (loan)	2013	Série C	15	0	14	0	1	0	—		—		30	0
Caxias (loan)	Subtotal		18	0	14	0	1	0	—		—		33	0
Ituano	2014	Série D	0	0	18	0	—		—		—		18	0
Coritiba	2014	Série A	12	1	—		2	0	—		—		14	1
Chapecoense	2015	Série A	35	0	19	1	2	0	5 (Note: Appearance(s) in Copa Sudamericana)	0	—		61	1
Chapecoense	2016	Série A	29	3	19	0	3	0	7	0	—		58	3
Chapecoense	Subtotal		64	3	38	1	5	0	12	0	—		119	4
Career total			96	4	90	1	9	0	12	0	0	0	207	5

== Honours ==
Ituano

- Campeonato Paulista: 2014

Chapecoense

- Campeonato Catarinense: 2016
- Copa Sudamericana: 2016 (posthumously)
