= LaMia Flight 2933 =

2016 aviation accident, in Colombia

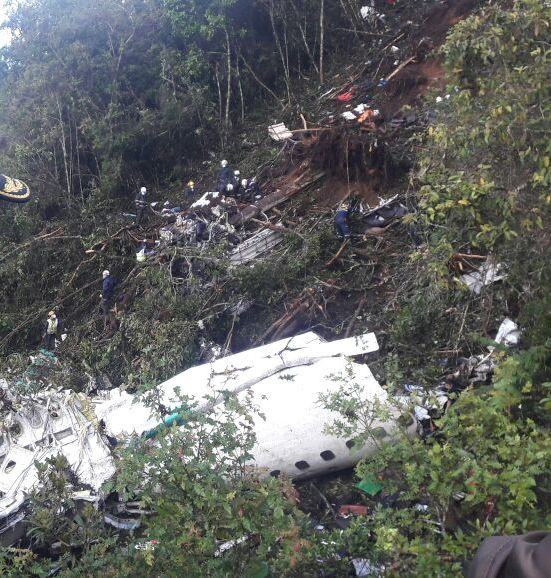
- Wreckage of the aircraft

Accident
- Date: 28 November 2016
- Summary: Controlled flight into terrain caused by fuel exhaustion
- Site: Mt. Cerro Gordo, near La Unión, Antioquia, Colombia; 5°58′43″N 75°25′6″W

Aircraft
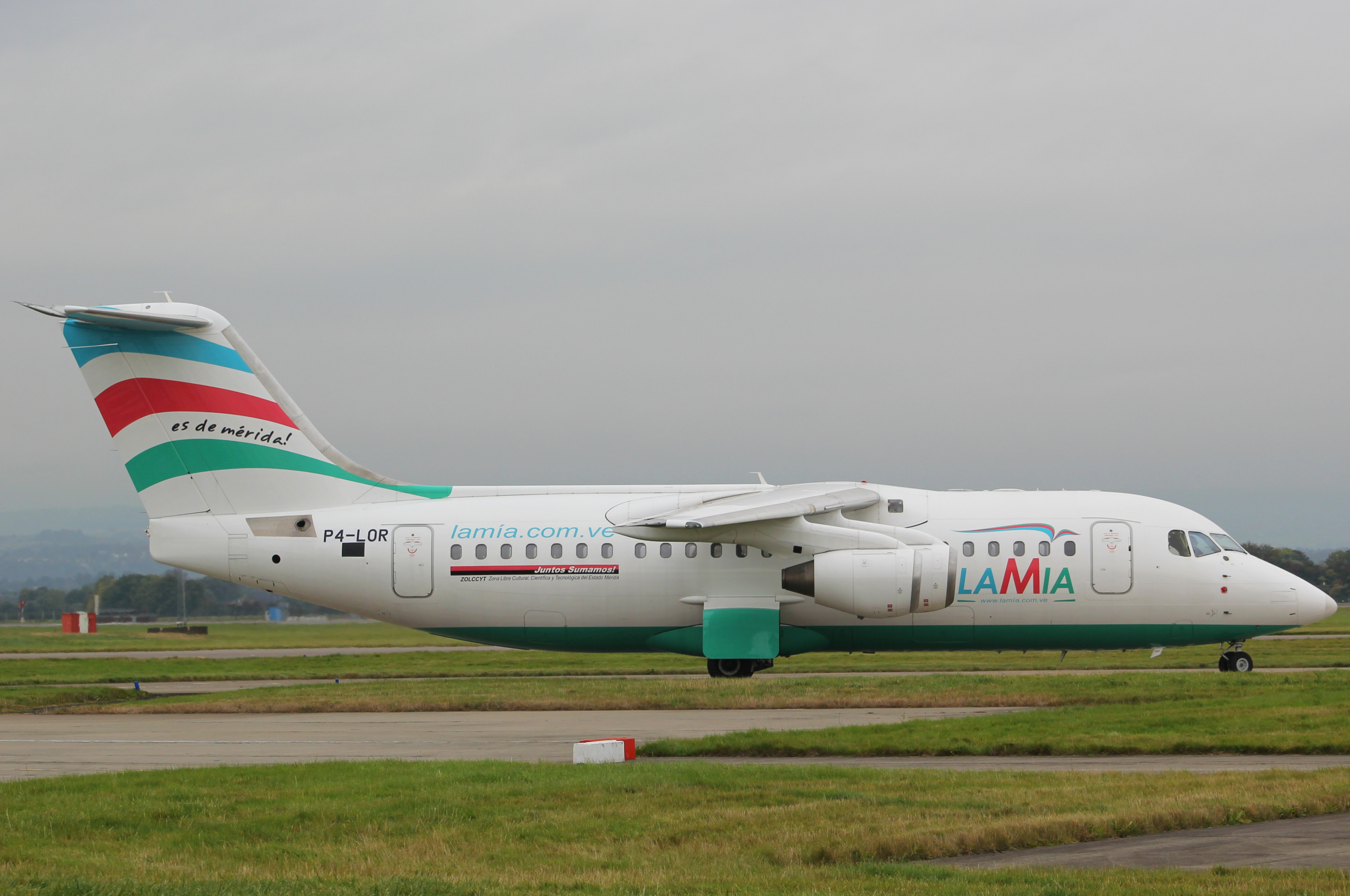
- The aircraft involved in the accident, seen in 2013 with a previous registration
- Aircraft type: Avro RJ85
- Operator: LaMia
- ICAO flight No.: LMI2933
- Call sign: LAMIA 2933
- Registration: CP-2933
- Flight origin: Viru Viru International Airport, Santa Cruz de la Sierra, Bolivia
- Destination: José María Córdova International Airport, Rionegro, Colombia
- Occupants: 77
- Passengers: 73
- Crew: 5
- Fatalities: 71
- Injuries: 6
- Survivors: 6

LaMia Flight 2933 was a regularly scheduled charter flight from Santa Cruz de la Sierra, Bolivia, to Medellín, Colombia. On 28 November 2016, the aircraft operating the flight crashed into Mt. Cerro Gordo near the town of La Unión, Antioquia, Colombia, killing 71 of the 77 people on board. The aircraft was transporting the first-team squad of the Brazilian football club Chapecoense and their entourage to Medellín where the team was scheduled to play at the 2016 Copa Sudamericana Finals. One of the four crew members, three of the players, and two other passengers survived with injuries.

The official report from Colombia's civil aviation agency, Aerocivil, concluded that the cause of the crash was a result of fuel exhaustion due to an inappropriate flight plan by the airline, and pilot error regarding poor decision-making as the situation worsened, including a failure to declare an emergency for 36 minutes after fuel levels became critically low, thus failing to inform air traffic control at Medellín – until just seconds before its fuel-starved engines flamed out, and 18 kilometres (9.7 nmi; 11 mi) from the airport – that an immediate landing was required.

== Aircraft and occupants ==
The aircraft involved was an Avro RJ85, registration CP-2933, serial number E.2348. It was acquired by LaMia in 2013. The captain was 36-year-old Miguel Alejandro Quiroga Murakami, who had joined LaMia in 2013 and was a former Bolivian Air Force (FAB) pilot. The captain also had previously flown for EcoJet and had lots of experience flying the Avro RJ85. At the time of the accident, captain Quiroga was one of the airline's co-owners as well as a flight instructor. Quiroga had logged a total of 6,692 flight hours, including 3,417 hours on the Avro RJ85.

The first officer was 47-year-old Fernando Goytia, who was also a former FAB pilot. He received his type rating on the Avro RJ85 five months before the accident and had 6,923 flight hours, with 1,474 of them on the Avro RJ85.

29-year-old Sisy Arias, a trainee pilot, was an observer in the cockpit. She had been interviewed by TV before the flight.

There were additional crew members travelling in the cabin, flight attendants Ximena Suarez and Romel Vacaflores, flight technician Erwin Tumiri, flight dispatcher Alex Quispe García (who prepared and filed the aircraft's flight path), and LaMia representative Gustavo Encina.

Among the passengers were 22 players of the Brazilian Associação Chapecoense de Futebol club, 23 staff, 21 journalists, and two guests. The team was travelling to play the away leg of the Final playoff in the 2016 Copa Sudamericana against Atlético Nacional.

== Accident ==
The planned (blue) and actual (red) itineraries from São Paulo to Medellín: The party flew with a different airline from São Paulo to Santa Cruz, where it boarded the LaMia aircraft. The refuelling stop at Cobija was cancelled following a late departure from Santa Cruz.

=== Background and transit to Bolivia ===
Chapecoense's initial request to charter LaMia for the whole journey from São Paulo to Medellín was refused by the National Civil Aviation Agency of Brazil because the limited scope of freedom of the air agreements between the two countries, under International Civil Aviation Organization rules, would have required the use of a Brazilian or Colombian airline for such a service. The club opted to retain LaMia and arranged a flight with Boliviana de Aviación from São Paulo to Santa Cruz de la Sierra, Bolivia, where it boarded the LaMia flight. LaMia had previously transported other teams for international competitions, including Chapecoense and the Argentina national team, which had flown on the same aircraft two weeks before. The flight from São Paulo landed at Santa Cruz at 16:50 local time.

=== Flight from Santa Cruz ===
Accident site within Colombia

The RJ85 operating LaMia flight 2933 departed Santa Cruz at 18:18 local time (22:18 UTC) on 28 November 2016. A Chapecoense team member's request to have a video game retrieved from his luggage in the aircraft's cargo delayed departure. The original flight plan included an intermediate refueling stop at the Cobija–Captain Aníbal Arab Airport, near Bolivia's border with Brazil; however, the flight's late departure meant the aircraft would not arrive at Cobija prior to the airport's closing time. An officer of Bolivia's Airports and Air Navigation Services Administration (AASANA – Spanish: Administración de Aeropuertos y Servicios Auxiliares a la Navegación Aérea) at Santa Cruz de la Sierra reportedly rejected the crew's flight plan for a direct flight to Medellín several times despite pressure to approve it, because of the aircraft's range being almost the same as the flight distance. The flight plan was approved by another AASANA officer. (Note: Some newspapers quoted LaMia's general manager as stating that the flight plan had been altered to include a refueling stop in Bogotá; in fact, no such change was made, and the crew continued with their plan to fly directly to Medellín.) The distance between Santa Cruz and Medellín airports is 1,598 nautical miles (2,959 km; 1,839 mi). A fuel stop in Cobija would have broken the flight into two segments, an initial segment of 514 nautical miles (952 km; 592 mi) to Cobija followed by a flight of 1,101 nautical miles (2,039 km; 1,267 mi) to Medellín, a total of 1,615 nautical miles (2,991 km; 1,859 mi).

The flight crew anticipated a fuel consumption of 8,858 kilograms (19,529 lb) for their planned route of 1,611 nautical miles (2,984 km; 1,854 mi) (including 200 kg for taxiing). After refueling at Santa Cruz, CP2933 had 9,073 kilograms (20,003 lb) on board. ICAO regulations would have required them to carry a total fuel load of 12,052 kilograms (26,570 lb), to allow for holding, diversion, and other contingencies. The RJ85's fuel tanks have a capacity of 9,362 kilograms (20,640 lb). Around 21:16 local time (02:16 UTC, 29 November), about 180 nautical miles (330 km; 210 mi) from their destination, the aircraft displayed a low-fuel warning. At this point, they were 77 nmi from Bogotá, but the crew took no steps to divert there, nor to inform ATC of the situation. The RJ85 continued on course and began its descent towards Medellín at 21:30.

Another aircraft had diverted to Medellín from its planned route (from Bogotá to San Andres) because of a suspected fuel leak. Medellín air traffic controllers gave that aircraft priority to land and at 21:43 the LaMia RJ85's crew was instructed to enter a holding pattern at the Rionegro VOR beacon and wait with three other aircraft for its turn to land. The crew requested and were given authorisation to hold at an RNAV waypoint named GEMLI, about 5.4 nautical miles (10 km; 6 mi) south of the Rionegro VOR. While waiting for the other aircraft to land, during the last 15 minutes of its flight, the RJ85 completed two laps of the holding pattern. This added approximately 54 nautical miles (100 km; 62 mi) to its flight path.

At 21:49, the crew requested priority for landing because of unspecified "problems with fuel", and were told to expect an approach clearance in "approximately seven minutes". At 21:52, a full 36 minutes after the onboard low-fuel warning had notified the crew of its situation, the crew finally declared a fuel emergency and requested immediate descent clearance and "vectors" for approach. At 21:53, with the aircraft nearing the end of its second lap of the holding pattern, engines 3 and 4 (the two engines on the right wing) flamed out due to fuel exhaustion; engines 1 and 2 flamed out two minutes later, at which point the flight data recorder (FDR) stopped operating. Shortly before 22:00, while flying in Colombian airspace between the municipalities of La Ceja and La Unión, the pilot reported an electrical failure and fuel exhaustion. An air traffic controller radioed that the aircraft was 0.1 nautical miles (190 m; 200 yd; 610 ft) from the Rionegro VOR, but its altitude data were no longer being received. The crew replied that the aircraft was at an altitude of 9,000 feet (2,700 m); the procedure for an aircraft approaching to land at José María Córdova International Airport states it must be at an altitude of at least 10,000 feet (3,000 m) when passing over the Rionegro VOR. Air traffic control radar stopped detecting the aircraft at 21:55 local time as it descended among the mountains south of the airport.

At 21:59, the aircraft hit the crest of a ridge on a mountain known as Cerro Gordo at an altitude of 2,600 metres (8,500 ft) while flying in a northwesterly direction, with the wreckage of the rear of the aircraft on the southern side of the crest and other wreckage coming to rest on the northern side of the crest adjacent to the Rionegro VOR transmitter facility, which is in line with runway 01 at José María Córdova International Airport and about 18 kilometres (9.7 nmi; 11 mi) from the southern end.

Profile of the flight's last 15 minutes

Aircraft's flight path in the last 15 minutes of the flight. Green line indicates the period during which the aircraft was in a holding pattern at Flight level 210 (approximately 21,000 feet altitude) (2:46:08–2:53:09 UTC). Orange star indicates the location where ADS-B signals were lost (2:55:48 UTC). The crash site is indicated in red.

Graphs of the aircraft's altitude and speed in the last 15 minutes before the FDR stopped recording

== Rescue ==
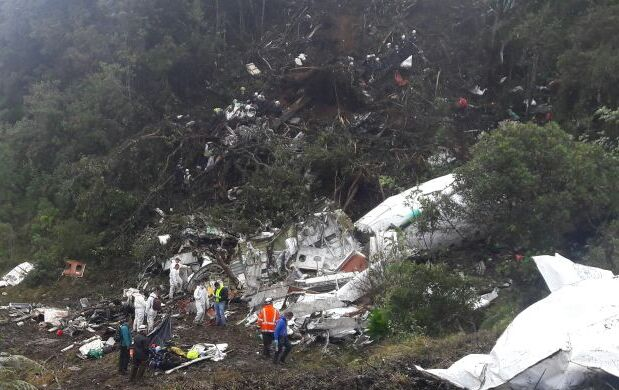

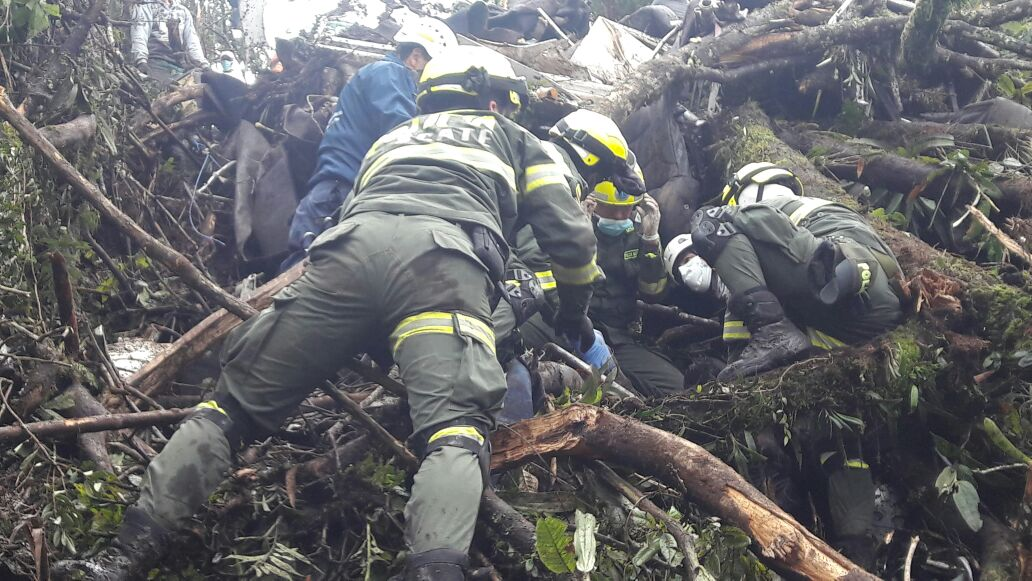
Workers amidst the aircraft's wreckage on a Colombian mountainside

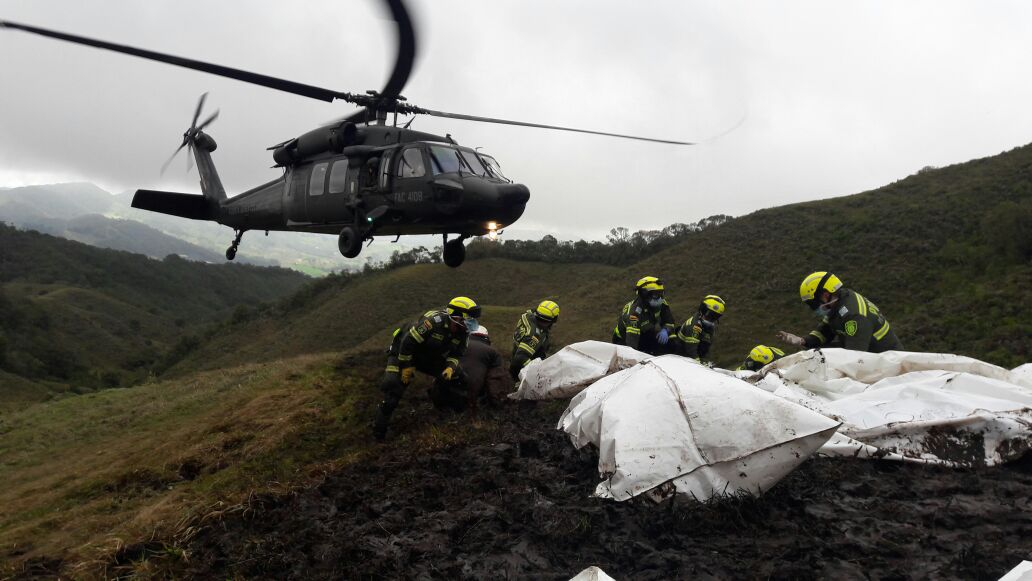
Recovery of bodies

Helicopters from the Colombian Air Force were initially unable to get to the site because of heavy fog in the area, while first aid workers arrived two hours after the crash to find debris strewn across an area about 100 metres (330 ft) in diameter. It was not until 02:00 on 29 November that the first survivor arrived at a hospital: Alan Ruschel, one of the Chapecoense team members. Six people were found alive in the wreckage. The last survivor to be found was footballer Neto who was discovered at 05:40. Chapecoense backup goalkeeper Jakson Follmann underwent a potentially life-saving leg amputation. 71 of the 77 occupants died as a result of the crash. These included captain Quiroga, first officer Goitya, training pilot Sisy Arias, flight attendants Garcia and Vacaflores, and LaMia representative Encina. The only crew members to survive were flight technician Tumiri and flight attendant Suárez. The number of dead was initially thought to be 75, but it was later revealed that four people had not boarded the aircraft. Colombian Air Force personnel extracted the bodies of 71 victims from the wreckage and took them to an air force base. They were then taken to the Instituto de Medicina Legal in Medellín for identification.

== Investigation ==
=== Colombian crash investigation ===
Graphs of flight altitude and airspeed from Santa Cruz until the engine flameouts and consequent loss of electrical power stopped the FDR recording

The Air Accident Investigation Group (GRIAA – Spanish: Grupo de Investigación de Accidentes Aéreos), the investigation group of Colombia's Civil Aviation Authority (UAEAC or Aerocivil – Spanish: Unidad Administrativa Especial de Aeronáutica Civil), investigated the accident, with assistance from BAE Systems (the successor company to British Aerospace, the aircraft's manufacturer) and the British Air Accidents Investigation Branch (AAIB) as the investigative body of the state of the manufacturer. A team of three AAIB accident investigators was deployed. They were joined by investigators from Bolivia's national aviation authority, the General Directorate of Civil Aviation (DGAC – Spanish: Dirección General de Aeronáutica Civil). In all, twenty-three specialists were deployed on the investigation; in addition to ten Colombian investigators and those from Bolivia and the United Kingdom, Brazil and the United States contributed personnel to the investigation. On the afternoon of 29 November the UAEAC reported that both flight recorders – the flight data recorder (FDR) and cockpit voice recorder (CVR) – had been recovered undamaged.

Evidence very quickly emerged to suggest that the aircraft had run out of fuel: the flight attendant who survived the accident reported that the captain's final words were "there is no fuel", and transmissions to that effect from the pilots to ATC were overheard by crews of other aircraft and recorded in the control tower. Shortly after the crash, the lead investigator stated that there was "no evidence of fuel in the aircraft" and the aircraft did not catch fire when it crashed. Analysis of the FDR showed all four engines flamed out a few minutes before the crash.

The investigation found that LaMia had consistently operated its fleet without the legally required endurance fuel load, and had simply been lucky to avoid any of the delays that the mandated fuel load were meant to allow for. An investigative report by Spanish-language American media company Univision, using data from the Flightradar24 website, claimed that the airline had broken the fuel and loading regulations of the International Civil Aviation Organization on 8 of its 23 previous flights since 22 August, three of which came within a month, including two direct flights from Medellín to Santa Cruz: one on 29 October transporting Chapecoense's final opponent, Atlético Nacional to the away leg of their Copa Sudamericana semifinal, and a flight without passengers on 4 November, and flights involving the Argentina national team to a match for the 2018 World Cup Qualifiers a week later. The report claimed the eight flights would have used at least some of the aircraft's mandatory fuel reserves (a variable fuel quantity to allow for an additional 45 minutes of flying time), concluding the company was accustomed to operating flights at the limit of the RJ85's endurance.

=== Findings in the final report ===
On 27 April 2018, the investigators, led by Aerocivil, released the final investigative report for the crash of Flight 2933, listing the following causal factors:

- The airline inappropriately planned the flight without considering the necessary amount of fuel that would be needed to fly to an alternate airport, fuel reserves, contingencies, or the required minimum fuel to land
- The four engines shut down in sequence as a result of fuel exhaustion
- Poor decision making by LaMia employees "as a result of processes that failed to ensure operational security"
- Poor decision making by the flight crew, who continued the flight on extremely limited fuel despite being aware of the low fuel levels aboard the aircraft and who did not take corrective actions to land the aircraft and refuel

Additional contributing factors cited by the investigators were:

- Deploying the landing gear early increasing drag and reducing lift
- "Latent deficiencies" in the planning and execution of non-regular flights related to the insufficient supply of fuel
- Specific deficiencies in the planning of the flight by LaMia
- Lack of supervision and operational control by the airline, which did not supervise the planning of the flight or its execution, nor did it provide advice to the flight crew
- Failure to request priority or declare an emergency by the flight crew, particularly when fuel exhaustion became imminent; these actions would have allowed air traffic services to provide the necessary attention
- Failure by the airline to follow the fuel management rules that the Bolivian DGAC had approved in certifying the company
- CP-2933's late declaration of priority, and further time lost before declaration of fuel emergency, delayed critical time needed to reroute dense traffic already in approach vectors in the Ríonegro VOR area

=== Other findings ===
The CVR had recorded the pilots discussing their fuel state and possible fuel stops en route, but they were so accustomed to operating with minimal fuel that they decided against a fuel stop when ATC happened to assign them an adjustment in their route which saved a few minutes of flight time. For unknown reasons, the CVR stopped recording an hour and forty minutes before the FDR, when the aircraft was still about 550 nautical miles (1,020 km; 630 mi) away from the crash site at the Rionegro VOR. Aviation analyst John Nance and GRIAA investigators Julian Echeverri and Miguel Camacho would later suggest that the most probable explanation is that the flight's captain, who was also a part-owner of LaMia, pulled the circuit breaker on the CVR to prevent a record of the subsequent discussions, knowing that the flight did not have the appropriate fuel load.

The aircraft was estimated to be overloaded by nearly 400 kilograms (880 lb).

Due to restrictions imposed by the aircraft not being compliant with reduced vertical separation minima (RVSM) regulations, the submitted flight plan, with a nominated cruising flight level (FL) higher than 280 (approximately 28,000 feet (8,500 m) in altitude), was in violation of protocols. The flight plan, which was filed with AASANA, included a cruising altitude of FL300 (approximately 30,000 feet (9,100 m)). The flight plan was sent for review to Colombian and Brazilian authorities as well, in accordance with regional regulations.

=== Bolivian criminal investigations ===
A week after the crash, Bolivian police detained the general director of LaMia, Gustavo Vargas Gamboa, on various charges including involuntary manslaughter. A warrant was issued for the arrest on the same charges of another of LaMia's co-owners, Marco Antonio Rocha Benegas, who fled to the United States. In 2017, Vargas Gamboa offered to plead guilty to negligent homicide if other charges were dropped; prosecutors rejected this offer and in 2021 the case was filed in the Tenth Sentencing Court of the city of Santa Cruz, where it apparently continues

An arrest warrant was issued for Celia Castedo Monasterio, the employee of AASANA in Santa Cruz who had approved Flight 2933's flight plan - it was later approved by another official. She fled the country seeking political asylum in Brazil, claiming that after the crash she had been pressured by her superiors to alter a report she had made before the aircraft took off and that she feared that Bolivia would not give her a fair trial; she was placed under arrest in Brazil in 2024 pending extradition to Bolivia.

Gustavo Vargas Villegas, the son of Gustavo Vargas Gamboa, was detained for allegedly using his influence as director of DGAC's aircraft registry to have LaMia's aircraft given an operational clearance. A prosecutor involved with the case told reporters that "the prosecution has collected statements and evidence showing the participation of the accused in the crimes of misusing influence, conduct incompatible with public office and a breach of duties."

== Reactions ==
=== Governmental ===
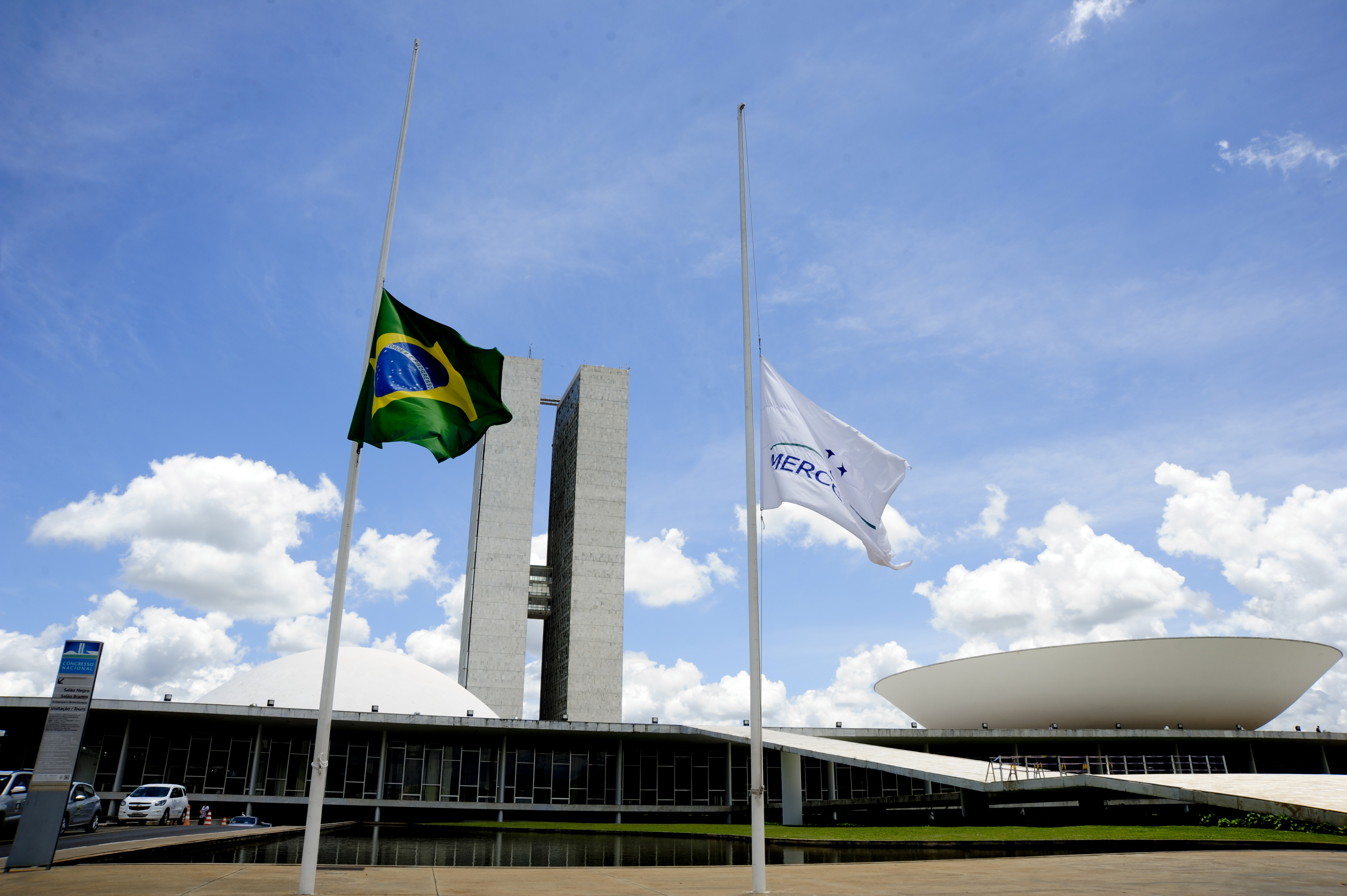
Brazilian and Mercosur flags at half staff at the National Congress Building in Brasília

Bolivia's General Directorate of Civil Aviation (DGAC – Spanish: Dirección General de Aeronáutica Civil) suspended LaMia's air operator's certificate and impounded its remaining two RJ85s. The Bolivian government suspended the director of the DGAC and the chief executive of AASANA as well as the director of the DGAC’s National Aeronautics Registry—the son of one of LaMia's owners. Bolivia's Defense Minister expressed concern over the possibility of aviation sanctions and downgrades by foreign national aviation authorities, for which consequences may include banning Bolivian carriers from foreign airspace.

Brazilian President Michel Temer declared three days of national mourning and requested that personnel from Brazil's embassy to Colombia in Bogotá be moved to Medellín to better assist the survivors and the families of the victims.

=== Sports ===
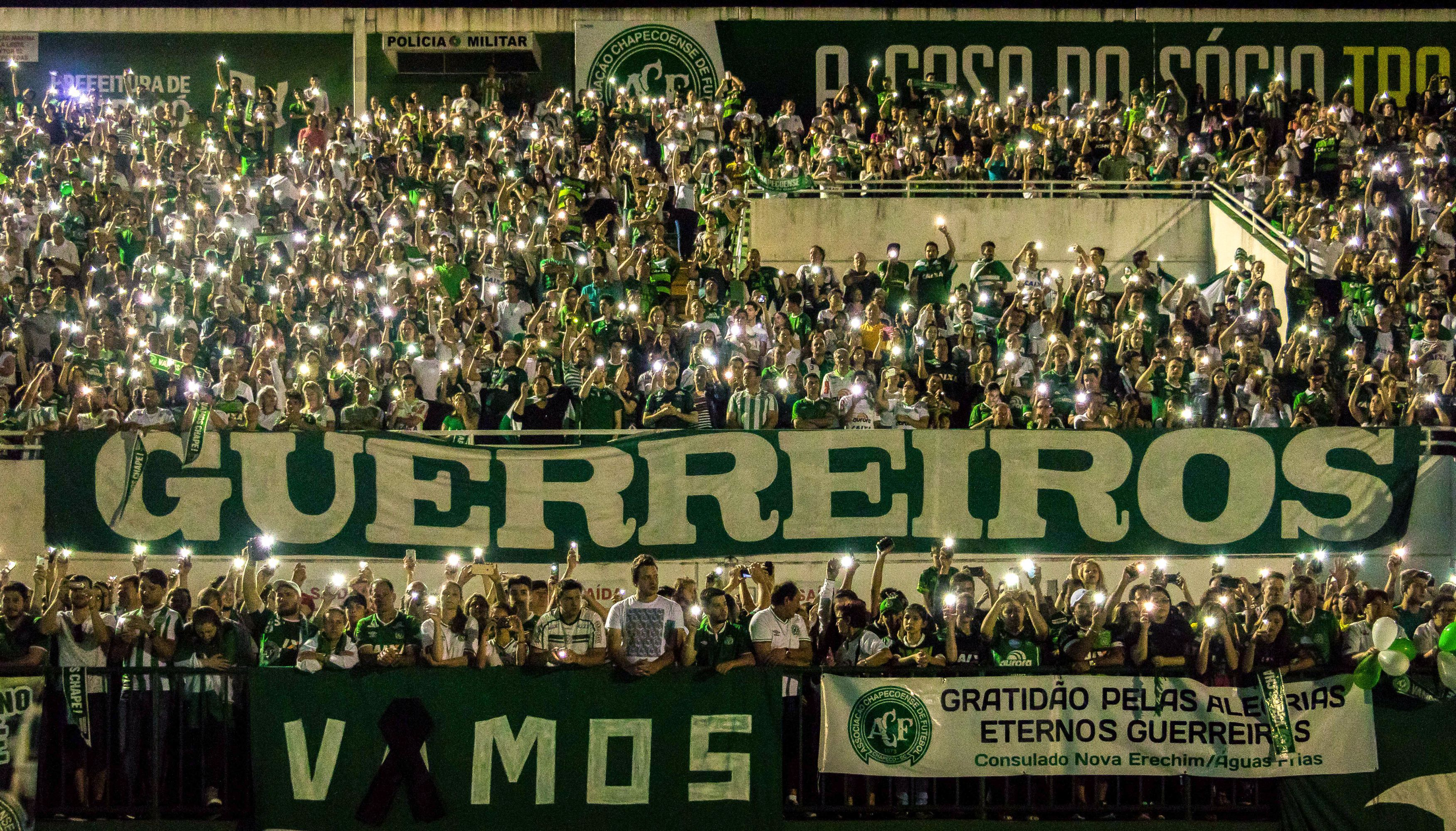
A vigil attended by thousands was held in Chapecó, the hometown of Chapecoense

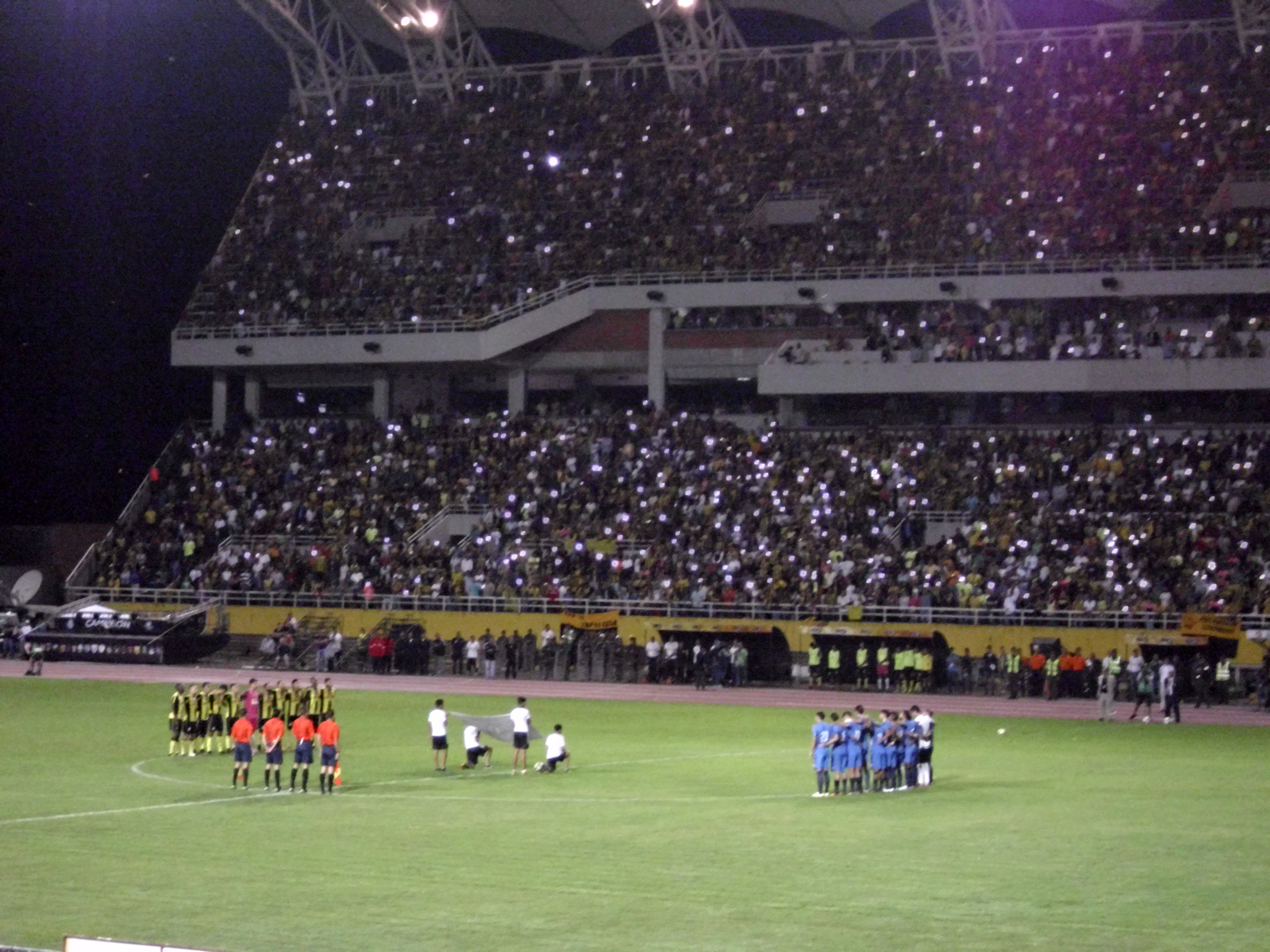
A minute of silence observed before a football match in San Cristóbal, Venezuela

Many South American football teams paid tribute to Chapecoense by changing their playing kits to include Chapecoense's badge or wearing Chapecoense's playing kit or green colours. Matches all over the world also began with a minute of silence.

==== CONMEBOL ====
All activities related to CONMEBOL (the South American Football Confederation) were suspended immediately, including both legs of the Copa Sudamericana final, scheduled for 30 November and 7 December, and the second leg of the Copa do Brasil Final. Atlético Nacional, Chapecoense's opponents-to-be in the final, asked CONMEBOL to honor Chapecoense by awarding them the Copa Sudamericana title, stating that "for our part, and forever, Chapecoense are champions of the 2016 Copa Sudamericana". CONMEBOL officially named Chapecoense the 2016 Copa Sudamericana champions on 5 December. The Brazilian team received the winner's prize money (US $2 million) and was awarded qualification to the 2017 Copa Libertadores, 2017 Recopa Sudamericana against Atlético Nacional and the 2017 Suruga Bank Championship against J1 League champions Urawa Red Diamonds. Atlético Nacional also received the CONMEBOL Centennial Fair Play Award in recognition of its sportsmanship in suggesting that Chapecoense be awarded the title.

==== FIFA ====
FIFA president Gianni Infantino gave a speech at Arena Condá, Chapecoense's stadium, at a public memorial. A committee representing FIFA at the service was composed of former football legends Clarence Seedorf and Carles Puyol; and Real Madrid player Lucas Silva. Infantino gave his speech at the end of the service by saying: "Today we are all Brazilians, we are all Chapecoenses". Nacional were awarded the FIFA Fair Play Award for requesting the Copa Sudamerica title to be awarded to Chapecoense.

==== UEFA ====
UEFA officially asked for a minute's silence at all upcoming Champions League and Europa League matches as a mark of respect. President Aleksander Čeferin said in a statement: "European football is united in expressing its deepest sympathy to Chapecoense, the Brazilian football confederation, CONMEBOL and the families of all the victims following this week's air disaster".

==== National football associations ====
The Argentine Football Association sent a support letter to Chapecoense offering free loans of players from Argentine clubs.

The Brazilian Football Confederation (CBF) encouraged Chapecoense to play its next scheduled Campeonato Brasileiro Série A game against Clube Atlético Mineiro, part of the final round of the tournament, as a tribute to the players. Both Chapecoense and Atlético Mineiro refused to play the match, but they were not fined by the Superior Court of Sports Justice.

Besides changing their profile pictures on social media to a black version of Chapecoense's badge and issuing messages of solidarity, other Brazilian teams offered to loan the club players for the next year and asked the CBF to exempt Chapecoense from relegation for the next three years.

In Colombia, a four-hour tribute took place at Atlético Nacional's stadium at the time Chapecoense's scheduled match would have kicked off. This was attended by 40,000 spectators with live coverage on Fox Sports and a live stream on YouTube.

The Uruguayan Football Association declared two days of mourning. The association's referees wore a Chapecoense badge on their shirts for the 14th matchday of the Uruguayan Primera División.

=== Other ===
Avianca, Colombia's flag carrier and largest airline, provided 44 psychologists to help in the counseling of the families of the victims. The airline, by request of the Colombian and Brazilian governments, also provided logistical support and transportation to Brazilian medical personnel who were involved in the identification of the deceased. On Twitter, Avianca expressed its regrets over the incident and stated that "our prayers are with the families of the victims".

LaMia's insurance policy with Bolivian insurer Bisa had lapsed beginning in October 2016 for nonpayment; while said policy did not cover flights to Colombia, which the insurer included as part of a geographical exclusion clause along with several African countries, as well as Peru, Afghanistan, Syria and Iraq. Nonetheless, the insurers agreed to fund a compensation scheme that would pay US$225,000 to each deceased passenger's family.

During an interview, Roberto Canessa, a member of a Uruguayan rugby team that was travelling to a match in 1972 when their aircraft crashed in what became known as the Andes flight disaster, said that he wanted to help the crash survivors.

Brazilian and Colombian Football Federation arranged a friendly fundraiser game on 25 January 2017 in Estádio Olímpico Nilton Santos, Rio de Janeiro. Brazil beat Colombia 1-0 in a friendly that raised over £300,000 for the families of the Chapecoense players and staff who were killed in the plane crash.

Spanish club FC Barcelona hosted Chapecoense for a friendly fundraiser on 7 August 2017, in order to help rebuild Chapecoense's team. Barcelona won 5–0. Alan Ruschel, one of the three surviving players, played his first game since the tragedy. He started the game as the captain and he played until the 35th minute, when he was substituted.

In all copies of FIFA 17, players were given the Chapecoense emblem for free to wear for their FIFA Ultimate Team Club.

== Survivors ==
The surviving players were Alan Ruschel, Jakson Follmann and Neto. The other survivors were a flight attendant and two other passengers. One of them, Erwin Tumiri, an employee of a Bolivian company contracted by LaMia to provide maintenance technicians to accompany the aircraft, said that there was no announcement by the pilots that there was an emergency and he thought the aircraft was simply descending prior to the crash. Tumiri would later be a survivor of the Colomi bus crash in 2021.

Chapecoense goalkeeper Danilo was initially reported to have survived the crash and to have been taken to a hospital, where he later succumbed to his injuries. However, the San Vicente Fundación hospital from Medellín clarified a few days later that he died in the crash.

Brazilian radio personality Rafael Henzel, who was a passenger on the flight and the only journalist to survive, later died on 26 March 2019 from a heart attack.

== Fatalities of notable persons ==
=== Chapecoense players ===
- Ailton Cesar Junior Alves da Silva (Canela), 22
- Dener Assunção Braz (Dener), 25
- Marcelo Augusto Mathias da Silva (Marcelo), 25
- Matheus Bitencourt da Silva (Matheus Biteco), 21
- Mateus Lucena dos Santos (Caramelo), 22
- Guilherme Gimenez de Souza (Gimenez), 21
- Lucas Gomes da Silva (Lucas Gomes), 26
- Everton Kempes dos Santos Gonçalves (Kempes), 34
- Arthur Brasiliano Maia (Arthur Maia), 24
- Ananias Eloi Castro Monteiro (Ananias), 27
- Marcos Danilo Padilha (Danilo), 31
- Filipe José Machado (Filipe Machado), 32
- Sérgio Manoel Barbosa Santos (Sérgio Manuel), 27
- José Gildeixon Clemente de Paiva (Gil), 29
- Bruno Rangel Domingues (Bruno Rangel), 34
- Cléber Santana Loureiro (Cléber Santana), 35
- Josimar Rosado da Silva Tavares (Josimar), 30
- William Thiego de Jesus (Thiego), 30
- Tiago da Rocha Vieira Alves (Tiaguinho), 22

=== Chapecoense staff ===
- Luiz Carlos Saroli (Caio Júnior), coach, 51

=== Media ===
- Deva Pascovicci, Fox Sports play-by-play announcer, 51
- Mário Sérgio Pontes de Paiva, Fox Sports commentator, former national team player and manager, 66
- Paulo Julio Clement, Fox Sports, 51
- Victorino Chermont, Fox Sports, 43

=== Guests ===
- Delfim de Pádua Peixoto Filho (Delfim Peixoto), Brazilian Football Confederation former vice-president, 75

== In popular culture ==
The United States cable TV network ESPN produced an hour long story about the crash for its E:60 news magazine TV show. The episode focused on how one of the pilots was also a co-owner of the airline company and the effects on the survivors and on family members of the people killed in the accident.

The crash of LaMia Flight 2933 was covered in "Football Tragedy", a Season 19 (2019) episode of the internationally syndicated Canadian TV documentary series Mayday (Air Crash Investigation for outside Canada and the United States).

The Rooster Teeth podcast Black Box Down reviewed this incident in Episode 109.

== See also ==
- List of accidents involving sports teams
- Avianca Flight 052
- Munich air disaster
