= Clube Municipal Ananindeua =

Brazilian association football club based in Ananindeua, Pará, Brazil

Ananindeua
- Full name: Clube Municipal Ananindeua
- Nickname: Tartaruga (Turtle)
- Founded: 3 January 1978
- Dissolved: 2014
Home colors	Away colors

Clube Municipal Ananindeua, commonly referred to as Ananindeua, was a Brazilian professional club based in Ananindeua, Pará. The club was founded on 3 January 1978.

== History ==
The town of Ananindeua is in the metropolitan area of Belém. It has approximately 400,000 inhabitants. Ananindeua is the city's main club. The team receives aid from a councilman of Ananindeua, Helder Barbalho, son of Jáder Barbalho. Helder helped the teams to return to the second state division and to contract experienced players.

== Record ==
- 1996 – won the second state division championship.
- 2001 – runner-up in the second state division championship.
- 2006 – finalist in the state championship, the most important tournament in Pará. They were the runners-up, losing the final to Paysandu Sport Club on penalties.

== Honours ==
- Campeonato Paraense
  - Runners-up (1): 2006
- Campeonato Paraense Second Division
  - Winners (1): 1996
- Taça Estado do Pará
  - Winners (1): 2006
