= Directorate General of Civil Aeronautics (Bolivia) =

Agency of the government of Bolivia

The Directorate General of Civil Aeronautics (Spanish: Dirección General de Aeronáutica Civil, DGAC) is an agency of the government of Bolivia. Its headquarters are on the ninth floor of the Edificio Multicine (Mutliplex Cinema Building) in La Paz. The agency investigates aviation accidents and incidents.
