= 2016 Campeonato Catarinense =

Campeonato Catarinense - Divisão Principal
- Season: 2016

The 2016 Campeonato Catarinense is the 93rd season of Santa Catarina's top professional football league. The competition began in January and will end in May.

== Format ==
First stage

- All ten teams play a round-robin playing once against each other team.
- The best team in this stage qualifies to the Final Stage.

Second stage

- All ten teams play a round-robin playing once against each other team.
- The best team in this stage qualifies to the Final Stage.

Semifinal stage

- The two teams that won the first and the second stage are joined by the two best teams in the overall standings.
- Home-and-away playoffs between the teams.

Finals

- Home-and-away playoffs between the winners of the first and second stages.
- The winner of the Finals is crowned champion.

Relegation

- The two worst teams in the overall standings are relegated to the second division of Campeonato Catarinense.

== Teams ==
Club	Home city
Avaí	Florianópolis
Brusque	Brusque
Camboriú	Camboriú
Chapecoense	Chapecó
Criciúma	Criciúma
Figueirense	Florianópolis
Guarani	Palhoça
Inter de Lages	Lages
Joinville	Joinville
Metropolitano	Blumenau

== First phase ==
=== League table ===
Pos	Team	Pld	W	D	L	GF	GA	GD	Pts	Qualification
1	Chapecoense	7	6	1	0	12	3	+9	19	Final stages
2	Criciúma	7	4	2	1	10	7	+3	14	
3	Internacional de Lages	7	3	3	1	12	8	+4	12	
4	Avaí	7	3	2	2	12	7	+5	11	
5	Brusque	7	2	3	2	8	9	−1	9	
6	Metropolitano	7	2	2	3	7	13	−6	8	
7	Joinville	7	1	4	2	8	10	−2	7	
8	Figueirense	7	1	2	4	6	10	−4	5	
9	Guarani de Palhoça	7	0	4	3	6	9	−3	4	
10	Camboriú	7	0	3	4	8	13	−5	3	

Updated to match(es) played on 26 February 2016. Source: First Phase Standings
Rules for classification: 1) points; 2) goal difference; 3) number of goals scored.
