= La Unión, Antioquia =

- Municipality and town
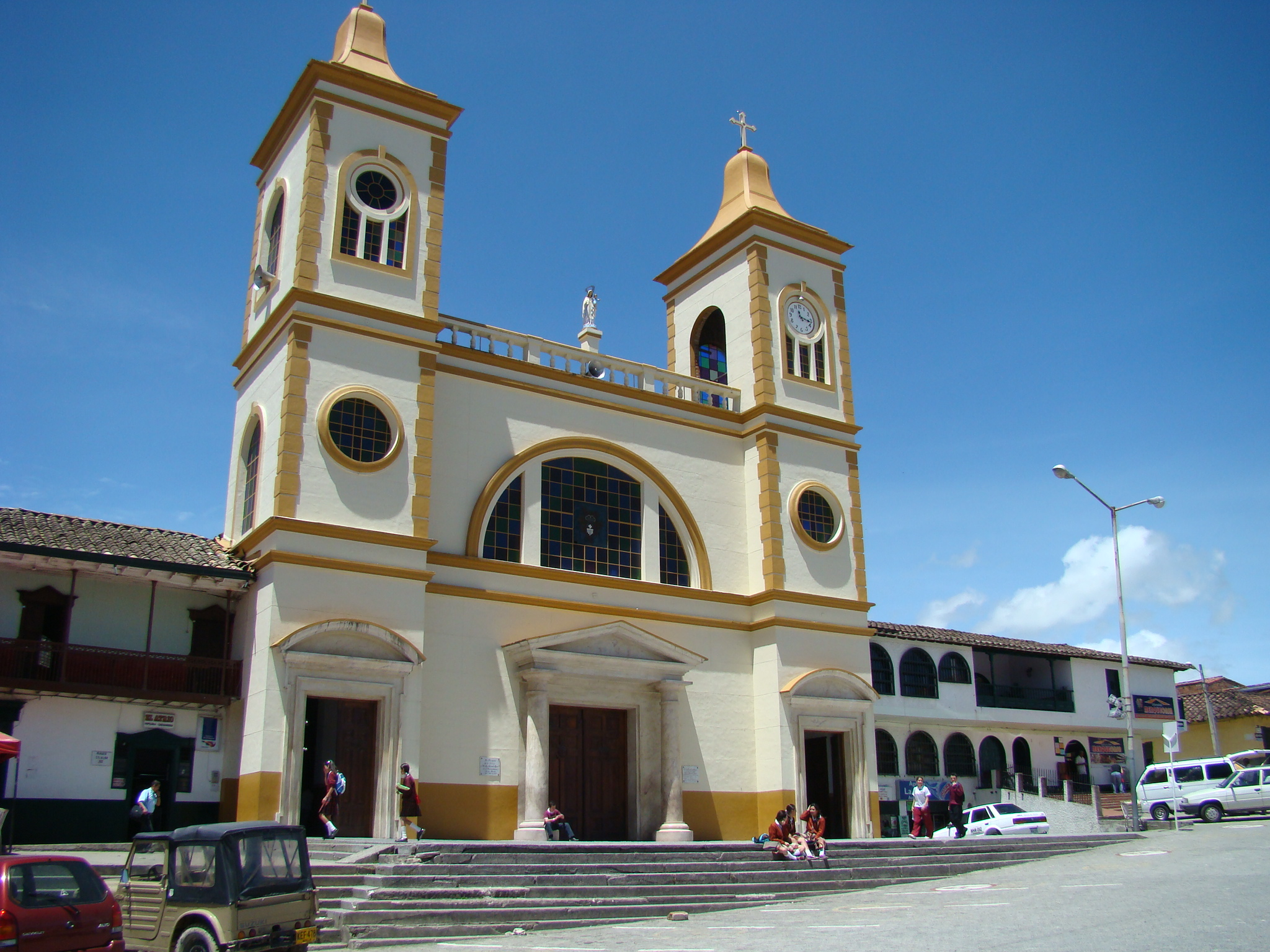

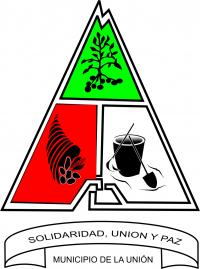
- Flag Seal

- Location of the municipality and town of La Unión, Antioquia in the Antioquia Department of Colombia

- Location in Colombia
- Coordinates: 5°58′22″N 75°21′40″W
- Country: Colombia
- Department: Antioquia Department
- Subregion: Eastern
- Elevation: 2,500 m (8,200 ft)

Population (Census 2018)
  - Total: 20,769
- Time zone: UTC-5 (Colombia Standard Time)

La Unión is a municipality in Colombia, located in the Eastern subregion of the department of Antioquia. It is bordered to the north by the municipalities of La Ceja and El Carmen de Viboral, to the east by El Carmen de Viboral, to the south by the municipality of Abejorral, and to the west by the municipality of La Ceja. Its capital is 57 kilometers away from Medellín, the capital of the department of Antioquia. The municipality covers an area of 198 square kilometers.

== History ==
La Unión emerged as one of the districts in the eastern region of Antioquia as a result of the spontaneous colonization of this central-eastern area of Antioquia. Other districts such as Abejorral, La Ceja, and Sonsón emerged in the same way, all during the 18th century.

The year 1778 is considered the official founding year of this locality, as it was then that the founders established the first hamlet on their own lands. Initially, it was baptized as Vallejuelo.

In 1877, the government of Antioquia created the district of La Unión, comprising fractions of land from the localities of La Ceja and El Carmen de Viboral. It would later lose this category but, in 1886, there was a growing opinion among the inhabitants and several influential figures from the surrounding areas, in favor of the district's existence, especially as it was part of the shortest route to the departments of Tolima and Cundinamarca.

It was not until 1911, along with other jurisdictions, that the municipality of La Unión was created again.

=== LaMia flight 2933 ===
The municipality is sadly known for the air disaster on November 28, 2016, when LaMia flight 2933 crashed in this municipality, resulting in 71 fatalities and 6 injuries. The flight came from Viru Viru International Airport (Santa Cruz de la Sierra) and was heading to José María Córdova International Airport (Rionegro). It was carrying the Brazilian football team Chapecoense, which was on its way to play the first match of the 2016 Copa Sudamericana final against Atlético Nacional. The accident occurred in La Unión, in the Pantalio area, in the northwest of the municipality; the area consists of hills and hillocks, on one of which (named Cerro Gordo), the tragedy occurred. The crash site would later be named Cerro Chapecoense, in honor of the victims, by municipal agreement.

== Climate ==
La Unión has a relatively cold subtropical highland climate (Cfb). It has heavy rainfall year round.

Climate data for La Unión (Mesopotamia), elevation 2,314 m (7,592 ft), (1981–2010)
Month	Jan	Feb	Mar	Apr	May	Jun	Jul	Aug	Sep	Oct	Nov	Dec	Year
Mean daily maximum °C (°F)	20.0 (68.0)	20.3 (68.5)	20.5 (68.9)	20.6 (69.1)	20.8 (69.4)	20.5 (68.9)	20.4 (68.7)	20.6 (69.1)	20.5 (68.9)	20.3 (68.5)	20.2 (68.4)	20.1 (68.2)	20.4 (68.7)
Daily mean °C (°F)	14.5 (58.1)	14.8 (58.6)	14.9 (58.8)	15.2 (59.4)	15.3 (59.5)	15.2 (59.4)	14.9 (58.8)	15.0 (59.0)	14.9 (58.8)	14.7 (58.5)	14.6 (58.3)	14.6 (58.3)	14.9 (58.8)
Mean daily minimum °C (°F)	9.9 (49.8)	10.2 (50.4)	10.4 (50.7)	10.6 (51.1)	10.6 (51.1)	9.9 (49.8)	9.6 (49.3)	9.7 (49.5)	10.1 (50.2)	10.2 (50.4)	10.2 (50.4)	10.1 (50.2)	10.1 (50.2)
Average precipitation mm (inches)	160.3 (6.31)	209.3 (8.24)	258.3 (10.17)	319.3 (12.57)	392.4 (15.45)	356.6 (14.04)	357.2 (14.06)	334.3 (13.16)	394.9 (15.55)	307.0 (12.09)	226.9 (8.93)	189.7 (7.47)	3,506.2 (138.04)
Average precipitation days (≥ 1.0 mm)	21	20	23	25	26	22	20	21	25	26	25	22	271
Average relative humidity (%)	87	87	87	88	87	85	84	83	86	87	88	88	86
Mean monthly sunshine hours	170.5	144.0	136.4	117.0	145.7	171.0	217.0	207.7	165.0	124.0	123.0	148.8	1,870.1
Mean daily sunshine hours	5.5	5.1	4.4	3.9	4.7	5.7	7.0	6.7	5.5	4.0	4.1	4.8	5.1
Source: Instituto de Hidrologia Meteorologia y Estudios Ambientales

== Geography ==
The locality is part of the Altiplano zone and is located in the highest part of the south of the San Nicolás Valley. The municipality has a complex mountain system, allowing it to have several thermal floors: of its total extension of 198 km², 136 km² comprise a cold climate (including the north, east, and south zones of the locality), and the remaining 62 km² (western area -El Guarango-) to a temperate climate. This allows for the cultivation of high Andean crops such as potatoes, uchuva, and lulo, to other temperate ones like coffee (to a lesser extent) and plantains. Another important geographic-geological feature is the maximum heights of 3050 m.a.s.l. at Cerro San Miguel (San Miguel Santa Cruz area) and 2737 m.a.s.l. at Morro Peñas (a prominence of the Antioquian batholith) located in the Vallejuelito-Peñas area (which is visible from much of the territory). The northern area is situated on a sedimentary plateau, rich in kaolin deposits; in contrast, the south is characterized by its rugged topography with volcanic soils, marking the beginning of the Sonsón Páramo system.

Regarding hydrography, the municipality is irrigated by numerous waterfalls and streams that are part of the Buey river basin, with its main tributaries, the Piedras river (crossing the locality from north to south, eastward forming a canyon, and born in the vicinity of the urban area), and the San Miguel river (originating near Mesopotamia); the Buey river, in turn, is a tributary of the Arma river, which finally flows into the Cauca river from its eastern slope.

It is connected by paved road to the city of Medellín and the municipality of La Ceja, through the Chuscalito area, thus being 57 km away from the departmental capital (approximately 1 hour and 30 minutes by car). It is also connected by paved road to the municipality of Sonsón, and through it to Argelia and Nariño. It has unpaved roads to El Carmen de Viboral and Abejorral. With Mesopotamia, it is connected by two roads, one paved (road to Sonsón) and the other unpaved (Chalarca road).

== Economy ==
The economy of La Unión has traditionally revolved around potato cultivation and dairy farming. Currently, it has a production level of 360 tons of tuber per week and an area planted of approximately 14 square kilometers.

Main economic sectors:

- Agriculture: potatoes, corn, beans, vegetables, floriculture, strawberries, uchuva, Andean blackberry, avocado
- Livestock: dairy and meat
- Mining (non-metallic): talc, kaolin, and clay
- Fish farming
- Dairy products

== Notable people ==
Among the most recognized personalities of the municipality is Felix María Restrepo Londoño (known as "El Tuso"), a thinker and philosopher who embodied the liberal and intellectual thought of the 20th century within this territory. During his youth (during his formative stay in Bogotá), he was in contact with important liberal leaders such as Rafael Uribe Uribe, who greatly influenced his thinking and leadership within the locality. Since 2003, what was once the Francisco de Paula Santander boys' school became, along with the Marie Poussepin girls' school, the current Félix María Restrepo Londoño Educational Institution, named in honor of this character.

The political life of the municipality has revolved around liberalism and the figure of Rafael Uribe Uribe, who, despite not being native to the locality, during his command of the liberal armies in the Thousand Days' War, had in his ranks the participation of inhabitants of La Unión; such is the importance of this leader (in shaping the liberal identity of La Unión), that a bronze bust was erected in his honor in the main park.

== Demography ==
Total Population: 21,475 inhabitants (2018)

- Urban Population: 12,724
- Rural Population: 8,751
- Literacy: 91.2% (2005)
  - Urban area: 93.6%
  - Rural area: 88.4%

== Ethnography ==
According to figures presented by DANE from the 2005 census, the ethnic composition of the municipality is:

- Mestizos and Caucasians (99.6%)
- Afro-descendants (0.4%)

== Festivities ==
- Popular and Folkloric Potato Festivals (last weekend of June, every year)
- Patron Saint Festivities of Our Lady of Mercedes (in September)

== Places of interest ==
- Church in the main park, Our Lady of Mercedes.
- Church in the Mesopotamia district (30 minutes from the municipal head).
- The chapel in the main park (the first Catholic temple in the locality).
- "Los fundadores" consistorial house (colonial architecture from the early 20th century -rebuilt-; main park).
- Tablas Bridge (Las Brisas area).
- Iron Bridge (El Cardal area).
- Piedras River (Piedras Teherán and San Francisco areas)
- Monument and Cave of "El Tuso" (El Guarango area).
- Presidio Waterfall (El Guarango area), canyoning.
- Natural baths (El Cardal and El Buey areas).
- Morro Peñas (Vallejuelito-Peñas area); rappelling and hiking can be practiced here.
- Dairy farms (Mesopotamia district, eastern and southern areas of the municipality).
- Cerro Gordo or Cerro Chapecoense (Pantalio area).

== General information ==
- Foundation: July 1, 1778
- Municipality erection, ordinance 18 of 1911
- Founders: José María Londoño and Vicente Toro
- Nicknames: Potato Emporium

Climate data for La Unión
Month	Jan	Feb	Mar	Apr	May	Jun	Jul	Aug	Sep	Oct	Nov	Dec	Year
Mean daily maximum °C (°F)	19.1 (66.4)	19.3 (66.7)	19.5 (67.1)	19.1 (66.4)	19.1 (66.4)	19.4 (66.9)	19.1 (66.4)	19.2 (66.6)	19.2 (66.6)	18.7 (65.7)	18.9 (66.0)	18.7 (65.7)	19.1 (66.4)
Daily mean °C (°F)	14.8 (58.6)	15.0 (59.0)	15.3 (59.5)	15.1 (59.2)	15.2 (59.4)	15.3 (59.5)	14.8 (58.6)	14.9 (58.8)	14.8 (58.6)	14.7 (58.5)	14.9 (58.8)	14.7 (58.5)	15.0 (58.9)
Mean daily minimum °C (°F)	10.5 (50.9)	10.7 (51.3)	11.1 (52.0)	11.1 (52.0)	11.3 (52.3)	11.2 (52.2)	10.6 (51.1)	10.6 (51.1)	10.5 (50.9)	10.7 (51.3)	10.9 (51.6)	10.7 (51.3)	10.8 (51.5)
Average rainfall mm (inches)	81.7 (3.22)	118.0 (4.65)	136.1 (5.36)	221.6 (8.72)	288.5 (11.36)	209.2 (8.24)	209.5 (8.25)	207.4 (8.17)	248.5 (9.78)	245.9 (9.68)	191.7 (7.55)	122.8 (4.83)	2,280.9 (89.81)
Average rainy days	12	13	15	20	23	18	17	17	20	22	18	13	208
Source 1:
Source 2:
