= 2026 Associação Chapecoense de Futebol season =

Associação Chapecoense de Futebol
2026 season
- Manager: Gilmar Dal Pozzo (until 3 April); Fábio Matias (6 April – 25 May); Rafael Lacerda (30 May–9 November); Vinícius Bergantin (from 15 November)
- Stadium: Arena Condá
- Campeonato Brasileiro Série A: 20th (relegated)
- Campeonato Catarinense: Runners-up
- Copa do Brasil: Round of 16
- Copa Sul-Sudeste: Runners-up
- Top goalscorer: League: Marcinho (5); All: Marcinho (5)
- Biggest win: Chapecoense 6–0 Joinville
- Biggest defeat: Chapecoense 0–4 Atlético Mineiro; Chapecoense 0–4 Flamengo
Home colours	Away colours

The 2026 season is the 54th season in the history of Associação Chapecoense de Futebol and its first season in the Brazilian Série A since 2021. The club also competed in the Campeonato Catarinense, Copa do Brasil, and Copa Sul-Sudeste.

== Transfers ==
=== In ===
Pos.	Player	Transferred from	Fee	Date	Source
DF	(Brazil) Rafael Thyere	(Brazil) Sport Recife	Undisclosed	12 December 2025	
MF	(Brazil) Jean Carlos	(Brazil) Criciúma	Undisclosed	1 January 2026	
DF	(Brazil) João Paulo	(Brazil) Associação Ferroviária de Esportes	Free	1 January 2026	
MF	(Brazil) João Vitor	(Brazil) Centro Sportivo Paraibano	Loan	1 January 2026	
DF	(Brazil) Kauan Faria	(Brazil) Goiânia	Undisclosed	1 January 2026	
MF	(Brazil) Higor Meritão	(Brazil) CRB	Free	1 January 2026	
GK	(Brazil) Anderson	(Brazil) Atlético Goianiense	Undisclosed	3 January 2026	
MF	(Brazil) Camilo	(Brazil) Grêmio	Loan	9 January 2026	
MF	(Brazil) Ênio	(Brazil) Juventude	Loan	9 January 2026	
FW	(Democratic Republic of the Congo) Yannick Bolasie	(Brazil) Cruzeiro	Free	11 January 2026	
DF	(Brazil) Bruno Pacheco	(Brazil) Fortaleza	Free	13 January 2026	
FW	(Brazil) João Bom	(Brazil) Volta Redonda U20	Undisclosed	17 January 2026	
MF	(Brazil) Maurício Garcez	(Brazil) Avaí	Undisclosed	2 February 2026	
GK	(Brazil) Matheus Aurélio	(Brazil) Tombense	Loan	26 March 2026	
MF	(Uruguay) Kevin Ramírez	(Brazil) Atlético Goianiense	Loan	26 March 2026	
MF	(Brazil) Max	(Brazil) Cuiabá	Loan	1 July 2026	
FW	(Brazil) Túlio Eduardo	(Brazil) Decisão Goiana	Undisclosed	13 July 2026	
DF	(Brazil) Bruno Tubarão	(Indonesia) Persija Jakarta	Free	23 July 2026	
DF	(Brazil) Fernando	(Brazil) Ceará	Undisclosed	24 July 2026	
FW	(Uruguay) Franco Rossi	(Mexico) Toluca	Loan	29 July 2026	
DF	(Brazil) Heitor	(Portugal) Portimonense	Undisclosed	11 August 2026	
MF	(Brazil) Yago Felipe	(Brazil) Sport Recife	Undisclosed	14 August 2026	
MF	(Colombia) Dylan Borrero	(Colombia) América de Cali	Free	18 August 2026	
MF	(Spain) Miguel Carvalho	(Saudi Arabia) Al Qadsiah	Undisclosed	20 August 2026	
MF	(Brazil) Rosivan	(Brazil) Maranhão	Undisclosed	9 September 2026	
DF	(Brazil) Dudu	(Brazil) Guarani	Loan	16 September 2026	

=== Out ===
Pos.	Player	Transferred to	Fee	Date	Source
DF	(Brazil) Felipe Vieira	(Brazil) Vitória	Loan return	31 December 2025	
DF	(Brazil) Gabriel Inocêncio	(Brazil) Botafogo-SP	Free	1 January 2026	
MF	(Brazil) Robert Santos	(Brazil) Atlético Mineiro	Loan	1 January 2026	
MF	(Brazil) Vinicius Balieiro	(Brazil) Santos	Free	1 January 2026	
MF	(Brazil) Thomás		Retired	1 January 2026	
GK	(Brazil) Deivity	(Brazil) Volta Redonda	Free	4 January 2026	
MF	(Paraguay) Jorge Roa Jiménez	(Brazil) Amazonas	Free	22 January 2026	
DF	(Brazil) Bressan	(Brazil) CRB	Undisclosed	5 February 2026	
FW	(Brazil) Mailson	(Brazil) Figueirense	Loan	11 March 2026	
GK	(Brazil) Léo Vieira	(Brazil) Bahia	Undisclosed	27 March 2026	
FW	(Brazil) Perotti	(Brazil) Sport Recife	Loan	27 March 2026	
MF	(Brazil) Jean Carlos	(Brazil) Náutico	Undisclosed	1 July 2026	
MF	(Brazil) Higor Meritão	(Brazil) Vila Nova	Undisclosed	4 July 2026	
MF	(Brazil) João Vitor	(Brazil) Centro Sportivo Paraibano	Loan return	9 July 2026	
MF	(Paraguay) Walter Clar	(Mexico) Atlante	Free	11 July 2026	
DF	(Brazil) Bruno Leonardo	(United Arab Emirates) Hatta	Undisclosed	29 July 2026	
FW	(Brazil) Italo	(South Korea) Jeonbuk Hyundai Motors	Loan	29 July 2026	
FW	(Brazil) João Bom	(Portugal) Felgueiras	Undisclosed	1 August 2026	

== Friendlies ==
5 July 2026	Grêmio (Rio Grande do Sul)	1–2	(Santa Catarina (state)) Chapecoense

26 September 2026	Atlético Nacional (Colombia)	1–1	(Brazil) Chapecoense

== Competitions ==
=== Campeonato Catarinense ===
6 January 2026 1	Chapecoense	1–1	Brusque
19:00 UTC−3

11 January 2026 2	Camboriú	2–0	Chapecoense
16:00 UTC−3

14 January 2026 3	Concórdia	1–2	Chapecoense
18:30 UTC−3

18 January 2026 4	Chapecoense	1–0	Marcílio Dias
19:30 UTC−3

21 January 2026 5	Avaí	1–1	Chapecoense
21:30 UTC−3

25 January 2026 6	Chapecoense	6–0	Joinville
18:00 UTC−3

==== Quarter-finals ====
1 February 2026 First leg	Criciúma	1–2	Chapecoense
18:00 UTC−3

8 February 2026 Second leg	Chapecoense	0–0 (2–1 agg.)	Criciúma
19:00 UTC−3

==== Semi-finals ====
14 February 2026 First leg	Brusque	1–0	Chapecoense
16:30 UTC−3

22 February 2026 Second leg	Chapecoense	3–0 (3–1 agg.)	Brusque
18:00 UTC−3

==== Finals ====
1 March 2026 First leg	Barra	3–1	Chapecoense
18:00 UTC−3

8 March 2026 Second leg	Chapecoense	1–0 (2–3 agg.)	Barra
18:00 UTC−3

=== Campeonato Brasileiro Série A ===
Pos	Team	Pld	W	D	L	GF	GA	GD	Pts	Qualification or relegation
16	Vitória	34	10	8	16	35	51	−16	38	
17	Internacional	34	9	11	14	38	42	−4	38	Relegation to Campeonato Brasileiro Série B
18	Grêmio (Note: Grêmio qualified for the Copa Libertadores group stage as 2026 Copa do Brasil champions or runners-up. If they are relegated, their berth will be passed to the Série A's highest-placed team not already qualified.)	35	9	11	15	38	47	−9	38	Relegation to Campeonato Brasileiro Série B
19	Remo	35	7	11	17	39	57	−18	32	Relegation to Campeonato Brasileiro Série B
20	Chapecoense (R)	35	4	9	22	33	72	−39	21	Relegation to Campeonato Brasileiro Série B

Updated to match(es) played on 18 November 2026. Source: CBF
Rules for classification: 1) points; 2) wins; 3) goal difference; 4) goals scored; 5) head-to-head results (only between two teams); 6) fewest red cards; 7) fewest yellow cards; 8) drawing of lots.
(R) Relegated

==== Results summary ====
Overall								Home						Away					
Pld	W	D	L	GF	GA	GD	Pts	W	D	L	GF	GA	GD	W	D	L	GF	GA	GD
35	4	9	22	33	72	−39	21	3	5	9	22	38	−16	1	4	13	11	34	−23

Last updated: 18 November 2026.

==== Results by round ====
Round	1	2	3	4	5	6	7	8	9	10	11	12	13	14	15	16	17	18	19	20	21	22	23	24	25	26	27	28	29	30	31	32	33	34	35
Ground	H	A	H	A	A	H	H	A	H	H	A	H	A	H	A	H	A	A	H	A	H	A	H	H	A	A	H	A	A	H	A	H	A	H	A
Result	W	D	D	L	L	D	D	L	L	D	L	L	L	L	D	L	L	L	L	D	L	L	D	W	L	W	L	D	L	L	L	W	L	L	L
Position	2	3	8	10	13	12	14	17	18	17	19	20	20	20	20	20	20	20	20	20	20	20	20	20	20	20	20	20	20	20	20	20	20	20	20
Points	3	4	5	5	5	6	7	7	7	8	8	8	8	8	9	9	9	9	9	10	10	10	11	14	14	17	17	18	18	18	18	21	21	21	21

Updated to match(es) played on 18 November 2026. Source:
A = Away; H = Home; W = Win; D = Draw; L = Loss

==== Matches ====
28 January 2026 1	Chapecoense	4–2	Santos
20:00 UTC−3

5 February 2026 2	Vasco da Gama	1–1	Chapecoense
20:00 UTC−3

11 February 2026 3	Chapecoense	3–3	Coritiba
19:00 UTC−3

12 March 2026 5	São Paulo	2–0	Chapecoense
20:00 UTC−3

16 March 2026 6	Chapecoense	1–1	Grêmio
20:00 UTC−3

19 March 2026 7	Chapecoense	0–0	Corinthians
21:30 UTC−3

22 March 2026 8	Internacional	2–0	Chapecoense
18:30 UTC−3

2 April 2026 9	Chapecoense	0–4	Atlético Mineiro
19:00 UTC−3

5 April 2026 10	Chapecoense	1–1	Vitória
16:00 UTC−3

12 April 2026 11	Athletico Paranaense	2–0	Chapecoense
11:00 UTC−3

18 April 2026 12	Chapecoense	1–4	Botafogo
18:30 UTC−3

26 April 2026 13	Fluminense	2–1	Chapecoense
20:30 UTC−3

3 May 2026 14	Chapecoense	1–2	Red Bull Bragantino
18:30 UTC−3

10 May 2026 15	Mirassol	1–1	Chapecoense
18:30 UTC−3

17 May 2026 16	Chapecoense	2–3	Remo
18:30 UTC−3

24 May 2026 17	Cruzeiro	2–1	Chapecoense
16:00 UTC−3

31 May 2026 18	Palmeiras	1–0	Chapecoense
16:00 UTC−3

17 July 2026 4	Bahia	2–0	Chapecoense
19:30 UTC−3

22 July 2026 19	Chapecoense	0–4	Flamengo
21:30 UTC−3

25 July 2026 20	Santos	2–2	Chapecoense
18:30 UTC−3

8 August 2026 22	Coritiba	2–1	Chapecoense
20:30 UTC−3

16 August 2026 23	Chapecoense	3–3	Bahia	Chapecó
11:00 UTC−3	Giovanni Augusto 19'; Marcinho 48'; Túlio 71'; Camilo (yellow card) 89'		Véliz 13' (pen.); Kauan 42' (o.g.); Acevedo 65'; Sanabria (yellow card) 84'; Pulga (yellow card) 90+2'	Stadium: Arena Condá; Referee: Daiane Muniz

23 August 2026 24	Chapecoense	1–0	São Paulo	Chapecó
18:30	Bruno Pacheco 26'			Stadium: Arena Condá

30 August 2026 25	Grêmio	3–1	Chapecoense	Porto Alegre
18:30				Stadium: Arena do Grêmio; Referee: Rodrigo José Pereira de Lima

6 September 2026 26	Corinthians	1–2	Chapecoense	São Paulo
19:30				Stadium: Arena Corinthians

12 September 2026 27	Chapecoense	1–2	Internacional	Chapecó
17:00

19 September 2026 28	Atlético Mineiro	1–1	Chapecoense	Belo Horizonte
16:00

7 October 2026 29	Vitória	4–0	Chapecoense	Salvador
20:00

12 October 2026 30	Chapecoense	1–4	Athletico Paranaense	Chapecó
19:30

17 October 2026 31	Botafogo	1–0	Chapecoense	Rio de Janeiro
18:00

24 October 2026 32	Chapecoense	2–1	Fluminense
19:30

28 October 2026 33	Red Bull Bragantino	3–0	Chapecoense
19:30

3 November 2026 34	Chapecoense	1–2	Mirassol
19:30

14 November 2026 21	Chapecoense	0–2	Vasco da Gama
20:30

18 November 2026 35	Remo	2–0	Chapecoense	Belém
20:00 UTC−3	Jajá Silva 3'; Patrick 20' (pen.); Picco (yellow card) 45'; Galeano (yellow card) 68'; Gabriel Taliari (yellow card) 78'		Giovanni Augusto (yellow card) 44'; David Antunes (yellow card) 47'; Eduardo Doma (yellow card) 68'	Stadium: Mangueirão; Referee: Alex Gomes Stefano

=== Copa Sul-Sudeste ===
25 March 2026 1	Chapecoense (Santa Catarina (state))	2–1	(São Paulo (state)) São Bernardo
21:45 UTC−3

28 March 2026 2	Volta Redonda (Rio de Janeiro (state))	1–0	(Santa Catarina (state)) Chapecoense
19:00 UTC−3

8 April 2026 3	Chapecoense (Santa Catarina (state))	2–1	(Santa Catarina (state)) Avaí
19:00 UTC−3

15 April 2026 4	Juventude (Rio Grande do Sul)	0–0	(Santa Catarina (state)) Chapecoense
21:15 UTC−3

29 April 2026 5	Chapecoense (Santa Catarina (state))	2–1	(Minas Gerais) América Mineiro
19:30 UTC−3

6 May 2026 6	Operário Ferroviário (Paraná (state))	1–2	(Santa Catarina (state)) Chapecoense
21:30 UTC−3

==== Semi-finals ====
20 May 2026 First leg	Novorizontino (São Paulo (state))	0–2	(Santa Catarina (state)) Chapecoense
19:00 UTC−3

27 May 2026 Second leg	Chapecoense (Santa Catarina (state))	2–2 (4–2 agg.)	(São Paulo (state)) Novorizontino
19:00 UTC−3

==== Finals ====
3 June 2026 First leg	Avaí (Santa Catarina (state))	3–0	(Santa Catarina (state)) Chapecoense
20:00 UTC−3

7 June 2026 Second leg	Chapecoense (Santa Catarina (state))	3–0 (3–3 agg.) (4–5 p)	(Santa Catarina (state)) Avaí
11:00 UTC−3

=== Copa do Brasil ===
==== Fifth round ====
21 April 2026 First leg	Botafogo (Rio de Janeiro (state))	1–0	(Santa Catarina (state)) Chapecoense
17:00 UTC−3

14 May 2026 Second leg	Chapecoense (Santa Catarina (state))	2–0 (2–1 agg.)	(Rio de Janeiro (state)) Botafogo
18:00 UTC−3

==== Round of 16 ====
2 August 2026 First leg	Chapecoense (Santa Catarina (state))	0–0	(Minas Gerais) Cruzeiro
18:30 UTC−3

5 August 2026 Second leg	Cruzeiro (Minas Gerais)	2–0 (2–0 agg.)	(Santa Catarina (state)) Chapecoense
19:00 UTC−3
