= Vinicius Eduardo =

Brazilian footballer

Personal information
- Full name: Vinicius Eduardo de Almeida Gomes da Silva
- Date of birth: 18 February 2005 (age 21)
- Place of birth: Brazil
- Position: Centre-back

Team information
- Current team: Chapecoense
- Number: 35

Youth career
- Flamengo-SP
- 2022–2026: Chapecoense

Senior career*
Years	Team	Apps	(Gls)
2026–	Chapecoense	2	(0)
- * Club domestic league appearances and goals as of 14:12, 1 June 2026 (UTC)

Vinicius Eduardo de Almeida Gomes da Silva (born 18 February 2005), known as Vinicius Eduardo or just Vinicius, is a Brazilian footballer who plays as a centre-back for Chapecoense.

== Career ==
Vinicius joined the youth categories of Chapecoense in 2021, from Flamengo-SP. After making his senior debut in the 2023 Copa Santa Catarina, he was mainly used in the under-20 team before being promoted to the main squad on 25 January 2026.

After being mainly used with a reserve squad in the Copa Sul-Sudeste, Vinicius made his Série A debut on 24 May 2026, coming on as a first-half substitute for injured Eduardo Doma in a 2–1 away loss to Cruzeiro, but suffered an injury and was himself subbed off by Jean Carlos late in the match.

== Career statistics ==
As of 1 June 2026

Club	Season	League			State League		Cup		Continental		Other		Total	
Club	Season	Division	Apps	Goals	Apps	Goals	Apps	Goals	Apps	Goals	Apps	Goals	Apps	Goals
Chapecoense	2023	Série B	—		—		—		—		1 (Note: Appearance(s) in Copa Santa Catarina)	0	1	0
Chapecoense	2024	Série B	—		—		—		—		4	0	4	0
Chapecoense	2025	Série B	—		—		—		—		6	0	6	0
Chapecoense	2026	Série A	2	0	0	0	0	0	—		6 (Note: Appearance(s) in Copa Sul-Sudeste)	0	8	0
Career total			2	0	0	0	0	0	0	0	17	0	19	0
