= Rodrigo Endrio =

Brazilian footballer

Personal information
- Full name: Rodrigo Endrio Azevedo Tiago
- Date of birth: 3 July 2007 (age 19)
- Place of birth: Curitiba, Brazil
- Position: Forward

Team information
- Current team: Chapecoense
- Number: 39

Youth career
- 2022–: Chapecoense
- 2025–2026: → Red Bull Bragantino (loan)

Senior career*
Years	Team	Apps	(Gls)
2023–	Chapecoense	5	(0)
- * Club domestic league appearances and goals as of 02:52, 16 October 2026 (UTC)

Rodrigo Endrio Azevedo Tiago (born 3 July 2007), known as Rodrigo Endrio or just Rodrigo, is a Brazilian footballer who plays as a forward for Chapecoense.

== Career ==
Born in Curitiba, Paraná, Rodrigo joined Chapecoense's youth sides in August 2022. He signed a professional contract with the club in the following year, and made his senior debut on 8 October 2023, in a 2–0 Copa Santa Catarina home win over Hercílio Luz; aged 16 years and 97 days, he became the youngest debutant in the club's history.

After featuring for the under-17 and under-20 squads, Rodrigo made his professional debut on 17 June 2024, playing the last 11 minutes of a 1–0 Série B home loss to Operário Ferroviário. On 31 March of the following year, he was loaned to Red Bull Bragantino and returned to the youth setup.

Back to Chape in February 2026, Rodrigo renewed his link until 2028 on 4 March. He made his Série A debut on 13 October, coming on as a second-half substitute for Giovanni Augusto in a 4–1 home loss to Athletico Paranaense.

== Career statistics ==
As of 15 October 2026

Club	Season	League			State League		Cup		Continental		Other		Total	
Club	Season	Division	Apps	Goals	Apps	Goals	Apps	Goals	Apps	Goals	Apps	Goals	Apps	Goals
Chapecoense	2023	Série B	0	0	—		—		—		3 (Note: Appearance(s) in Copa Santa Catarina)	0	3	0
Chapecoense	2024	Série B	2	0	0	0	—		—		3	0	5	0
Chapecoense	2025	Série B	—		2	0	—		—		—		2	0
Chapecoense	2026	Série A	1	0	—		1	0	—		5 (Note: Appearance(s) in Copa Sul-Sudeste)	0	7	0
Career total			3	0	2	0	1	0	0	0	11	0	17	0
