= Federal University of Fronteira Sul =

University in Chapecó, Brazil

Coordinates: 27°06′22″S 52°36′58″W

- Universidade Federal da Fronteira Sul
- Other names: UFFS
- Established: 2009
- Rector: João Braida
- Students: 7,792 (2019)
- Location: Chapecó, Santa Catarina, Brazil
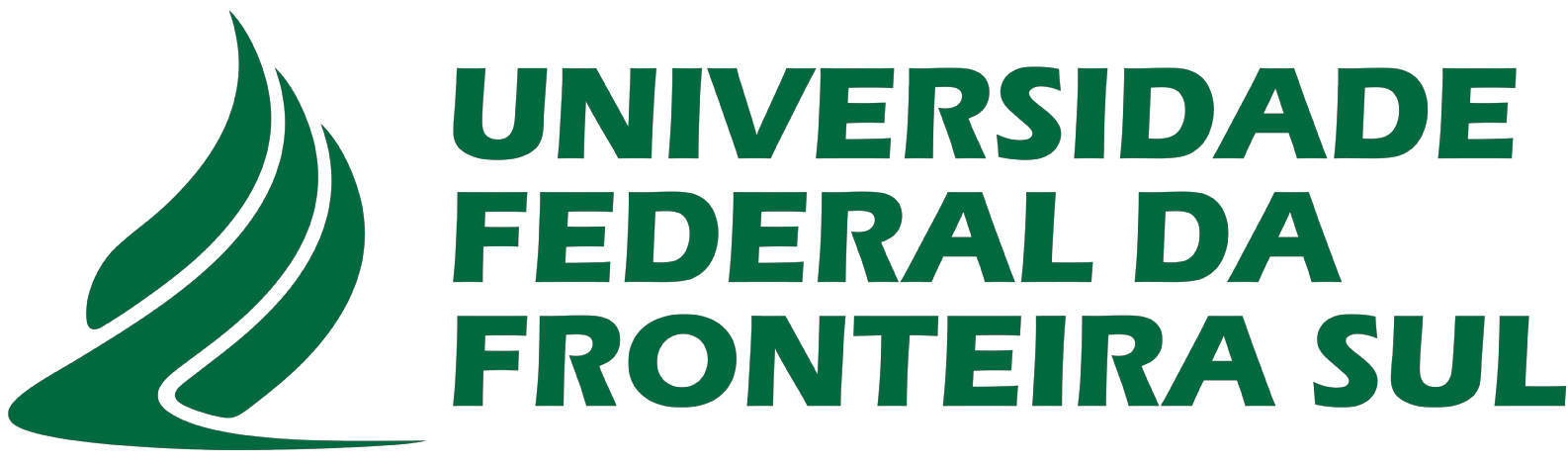

The Federal University of Fronteira Sul (Portuguese: Universidade Federal da Fronteira Sul, UFFS) is a public, federally-funded Brazilian university serving the interior of Southern Brazil. It was formally founded by act of legislature in September 2009, and planned to graduate 10,000 students within its first five years.

Its headquarters and main campus are in Chapecó, Santa Catarina, and smaller campuses are located in Laranjeiras do Sul and Realeza in Paraná, and Cerro Largo, Erechim, and Passo Fundo in Rio Grande do Sul. Its current rector is Marcelo Rectenvald, appointed in 2019 for a four-year term.

In 2019, the university enrolled 7,792 students in 42 programs, and was ranked by Folha de S.Paulo 114th nationally.

== See also ==
- List of federal universities of Brazil
