= Jhonnathan =

Brazilian footballer

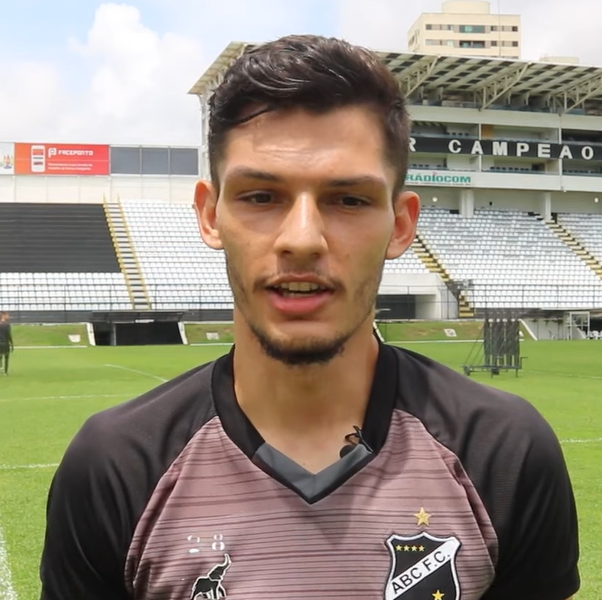
- Jhonnathan with ABC in 2023

Personal information
- Full name: Jhonnathan Espedito Coco Wagner
- Date of birth: 4 March 2001 (age 25)
- Place of birth: Foz do Iguaçu, Brazil
- Height: 1.85 m (6 ft 1 in)
- Position: Centre back

Team information
- Current team: Figueirense
- Number: 25

Youth career
- 2012–2015: Independente de Limeira
- 2014: → Corinthians (loan)
- 2016: Ponte Preta
- 2017: Inter de Limeira
- 2018–2022: Santos

Senior career*
Years	Team	Apps	(Gls)
2021–2024	Santos	4	(0)
2022	→ Brasil de Pelotas (loan)	3	(0)
2023	→ ABC (loan)	22	(2)
2024	→ Água Santa (loan)	7	(0)
2024	→ Chapecoense (loan)	9	(1)
2025	Chapecoense	11	(0)
2026–	Figueirense	14	(1)
- * Club domestic league appearances and goals as of 19 November 2026

Jhonnathan Espedito Coco Wagner (born 4 March 2001), simply known as Jhonnathan, is a Brazilian footballer who plays for Figueirense. Mainly a central defender, he can also play as a defensive midfielder.

== Career ==
Born in Foz do Iguaçu, Paraná, Jhonnathan joined Santos' youth setup in March 2018, from Inter de Limeira. On 14 May 2018, he signed a youth contract with Santos.

In October 2019, Jhonnathan signed his first professional contract with the club, until September 2021. He made his first team debut for Peixe on 3 March 2021, coming on as a second-half substitute for Wagner Leonardo in a 1–1 Campeonato Paulista home draw against Ferroviária.

On 19 May 2021, Jhonnathan renewed his contract until April 2026. After failing to appear in any further match for the first team, he was loaned to Série C side Brasil de Pelotas on 20 June 2022.

On 28 November 2022, Santos agreed to loan Jhonnathan to ABC for the 2023 season. He scored his first professional goal the following 8 February, netting the winner in a 1–0 Campeonato Potiguar away success over Força e Luz.

On 21 December 2023, Jhnnathan was loaned to Água Santa for the 2024 Campeonato Paulista. The following 15 April, he moved to Chapecoense also in a temporary deal until the end of the year.

On 13 December 2024, Jhonnathan signed a permanent two-year deal with Chape.

== Career statistics ==
As of 3 February 2026

Club	Season	League			State League		Cup		Continental		Other		Total	
Club	Season	Division	Apps	Goals	Apps	Goals	Apps	Goals	Apps	Goals	Apps	Goals	Apps	Goals
Santos	2021	Série A	0	0	4	0	0	0	0	0	4 (Note: Appearance(s) in Copa Paulista)	0	8	0
Brasil de Pelotas (loan)	2022	Série C	3	0	—		—		—		—		3	0
ABC (loan)	2023	Série B	15	0	7	2	2	0	—		3 (Note: Appearance(s) in Copa do Nordeste)	0	27	2
Água Santa (loan)	2024	Série D	0	0	7	0	1	0	—		—		8	0
Chapecoense	2024	Série B	9	1	—		—		—		—		9	1
Chapecoense	2025	Série B	3	0	8	0	—		—		1 (Note: Appearance(s) in Copa Santa Catarina)	0	12	0
Chapecoense	Total		12	1	8	0	—		—		1	0	21	1
Figueirense	2026	Série C	0	0	0	0	0	0	—		—		0	0
Career total			29	1	26	2	3	0	0	0	8	0	66	3
