= Rafael Carvalheira =

Brazilian footballer

Personal information
- Full name: Rafael dos Santos Carvalheira Natividade
- Date of birth: 26 May 1999 (age 27)
- Place of birth: Rio de Janeiro, Brazil
- Height: 1.76 m (5 ft 9 in)
- Position: Attacking midfielder

Team information
- Current team: Chapecoense
- Number: 99

Youth career
- 2011–2018: Flamengo

Senior career*
Years	Team	Apps	(Gls)
2019	Flamengo	0	(0)
2019	→ Globo (loan)	7	(1)
2019	→ Ceará (loan)	0	(0)
2020–2021	Ceará	0	(0)
2020	→ Guarany (loan)	3	(1)
2021	Cianorte	13	(2)
2022	Passo Fundo	8	(5)
2022	Brasil de Pelotas	9	(2)
2022	→ Passo Fundo (loan)	0	(0)
2023	Ituano	35	(2)
2024–	Chapecoense	119	(18)
- * Club domestic league appearances and goals as of 14:22, 1 June 2026 (UTC)

Rafael dos Santos Carvalheira Natividade (born 26 May 1999) is a Brazilian footballer who plays as an attacking midfielder for Chapecoense.

== Career ==
Born in Rio de Janeiro, Carvalheira was a Flamengo youth graduate. On 26 December 2018, he was loaned to Globo for the 2019 Campeonato Potiguar.

After making his senior debut with Globo, Carvalheira spent the rest of the 2019 campaign on loan at Ceará, but with their under-23 team. On 19 December 2019, he signed a permanent contract with Vozão.

In July 2020, Carvalheira was loaned to Guarany de Sobral for the remainder of the 2020 Cearense. On 29 December, he renewed his contract with Ceará until the end of the 2021 Cearense, but did not feature for the first team until leaving for Cianorte on 30 April 2021.

In 2022, after four months unemployed, Carvalheira joined Passo Fundo. After being the club's top scorer in the Campeonato Gaúcho Série A2, he moved to Brasil de Pelotas on 20 May, but returned to Passo Fundo on loan in September for the Copa FGF.

On 13 December 2022, Carvalheira was announced at Ituano. After being a backup option in the 2023 Campeonato Paulista, he started to feature regularly in the 2023 Série B.

On 5 December 2023, Carvalheira agreed to a one-year contract with Chapecoense.

== Career statistics ==
As of 1 June 2026

Club	Season	League			State League		Cup		Continental		Other		Total	
Club	Season	Division	Apps	Goals	Apps	Goals	Apps	Goals	Apps	Goals	Apps	Goals	Apps	Goals
Globo (loan)	2019	Potiguar	—		7	1	—		—		—		7	1
Ceará	2019	Série A	0	0	—		0	0	—		4 (Note: Appearance(s) in Copa Fares Lopes)	0	4	0
Ceará	2020	Série A	0	0	—		0	0	—		—		0	0
Ceará	2021	Série A	0	0	0	0	0	0	—		—		0	0
Ceará	Total		0	0	0	0	0	0	—		4	0	4	0
Guarany de Sobral (loan)	2020	Cearense	—		3	1	—		—		—		3	1
Cianorte	2021	Série D	12	2	1	0	2	0	—		—		15	2
Passo Fundo	2022	Gaúcho Série A2	—		8	5	—		—		11 (Note: Appearance(s) in Copa FGF)	3	19	8
Brasil de Pelotas	2022	Série C	9	2	—		—		—		—		9	2
Ituano	2023	Série B	29	2	6	0	2	0	—		—		37	2
Chapecoense	2024	Série B	33	4	9	0	—		—		—		42	4
Chapecoense	2025	Série B	38	7	13	1	—		—		—		51	8
Chapecoense	2026	Série A	14	2	12	4	1	0	—		2 (Note: Appearance(s) in Copa Sul-Sudeste)	1	29	7
Chapecoense	Total		85	13	34	5	1	0	—		2	1	122	19
Career total			135	19	59	12	5	0	0	0	17	4	216	35
