= Kauan Faria =

Brazilian footballer

Personal information
- Full name: Kauan Faria Gomes
- Date of birth: 7 April 2003 (age 23)
- Place of birth: São José, Brazil
- Height: 1.91 m (6 ft 3 in)
- Position: Centre-back

Team information
- Current team: Chapecoense
- Number: 21

Youth career
- Internacional
- 2021–2024: Chapecoense

Senior career*
Years	Team	Apps	(Gls)
2023–	Chapecoense	15	(1)
2024	→ Galo Maringá (loan)	2	(1)
2024	→ Paraná (loan)	8	(0)
2025	→ Goiânia (loan)	13	(1)
- * Club domestic league appearances and goals as of 21:09, 17 November 2026 (UTC)

Kauan Faria Gomes (born 7 April 2003), known as Kauan Faria or just Kauan, is a Brazilian footballer who plays as a centre-back for Chapecoense.

== Career ==
Born in São José, Santa Catarina, Kauan joined Chapecoense's youth sides in 2021, from Internacional. He made his senior debut in the 2023 Copa Santa Catarina with the club, before moving out on loan to Galo Maringá on 7 February 2024.

On 3 April 2024, Kauan was announced at Paraná also on loan. Back to Chape in August after helping Paraná to achieve promotion, he only appeared with the under-23 team in the remainder of the year.

On 10 January 2025, Kauan moved to Goiânia also in a temporary deal. He returned to his parent club in July, being again a backup option.

Kauan made his Série A debut on 8 August 2026, starting in a 2–1 away loss to Coritiba. He subsequently established himself as a first-choice, and scored his first goal in the category on 3 November, but in a home defeat to Mirassol for the same scoreline.

== Career statistics ==
As of 17 November 2026

Club	Season	League			State League		Cup		Continental		Other		Total	
Club	Season	Division	Apps	Goals	Apps	Goals	Apps	Goals	Apps	Goals	Apps	Goals	Apps	Goals
Chapecoense	2023	Série B	—		—		—		—		5 (Note: Appearance(s) in Copa Santa Catarina)	0	5	0
Chapecoense	2024	Série B	0	0	—		—		—		9	0	9	0
Chapecoense	2025	Série B	0	0	—		—		—		5	0	5	0
Chapecoense	2026	Série A	13	1	2	0	0	0	—		4 (Note: Appearance(s) in Copa Sul-Sudeste)	0	19	1
Chapecoense	Total		13	1	2	0	0	0	—		23	0	38	1
Galo Maringá (loan)	2024	Paranaense	—		2	1	—		—		—		2	1
Paraná (loan)	2024	Paranaense Série Prata	—		8	0	—		—		—		8	0
Goiânia (loan)	2025	Série D	5	1	8	0	—		—		—		13	1
Career total			18	2	20	1	0	0	0	0	23	0	61	3
