= Nivaldo =

Nivaldo may refer to:

- Nivaldo (name)
- Nivaldo (footballer, born 1968), born Nivaldo Soares de Oliveira Filho, Brazilian football striker
- Nivaldo (footballer, born 1974), born José Nivaldo Martins Constante, Brazilian football goalkeeper
- Nivaldo (footballer, born 1975), born Nivaldo Lourenço da Silva, Brazilian football midfielder
- Nivaldo (footballer, born 1977), born Nivaldo Vieira Lima, Brazilian football defensive midfielder
- Nivaldo (footballer, born 1980), born Nivaldo Batista Santana, Brazilian football centre-back
- Nivaldo (footballer, born June 1988), born Nivaldo Rodrigues Ferreira, Brazilian football striker
- Nivaldo (footballer, born July 1988), born Nivaldo Alves Freitas Santos, Cape Verdean football left midfielder
