= Kássio (footballer, born 2006) =

Brazilian footballer

Personal information
- Full name: Kássio da Silva de Jesus
- Date of birth: 17 March 2006 (age 20)
- Place of birth: Rio de Janeiro, Brazil
- Height: 1.60 m (5 ft 3 in)
- Position: Winger

Team information
- Current team: Chapecoense
- Number: 50

Youth career
- 2021–: Chapecoense

Senior career*
| Years | Team | Apps | (Gls) |
| 2026– | Chapecoense | 1 | (0) |
| 2026 | → Nacional-PR (loan) | 7 | (2) |
- * Club domestic league appearances and goals as of 15:57, 24 July 2026 (UTC)

Kássio da Silva de Jesus (born 17 March 2006), simply known as Kássio, is a Brazilian footballer who plays as a winger for Chapecoense.

== Career ==
Born in Rio de Janeiro, Kássio joined Chapecoense's youth sides in 2021, aged 15, from a local school named Escola de Futebol Conexão. On 19 November 2025, he signed his first professional contract with the club, until December 2027.

In March 2026, Kássio was loaned to Nacional-PR for the year's Campeonato Paranaense Second Division. Upon returning in May, he was initially assigned back to the under-20 team before extending his link until 2028 on 10 July.

Kássio made his professional – and Série A – debut on 22 July 2026, coming on as a second-half substitute for Giovanni Augusto in a 4–0 home loss to Flamengo.

== Career statistics ==
As of 24 July 2026

| Club | Season | League | | | State League | | Cup | | Continental | | Other | | Total | |
| Club | Season | Division | Apps | Goals | Apps | Goals | Apps | Goals | Apps | Goals | Apps | Goals | Apps | Goals |
|---|---|---|---|---|---|---|---|---|---|---|---|---|---|---|
| Chapecoense | 2026 | Série A | 1 | 0 | — | | — | | — | | — | | 1 | 0 |
| Nacional-PR (loan) | 2026 | Paranaense 2ª Divisão | — | | 7 | 2 | — | | — | | — | | 7 | 2 |
| Career total | | | 1 | 0 | 7 | 2 | 0 | 0 | 0 | 0 | 0 | 0 | 8 | 2 |
