= Gabriel Inocêncio =

Brazilian footballer (born 1994)

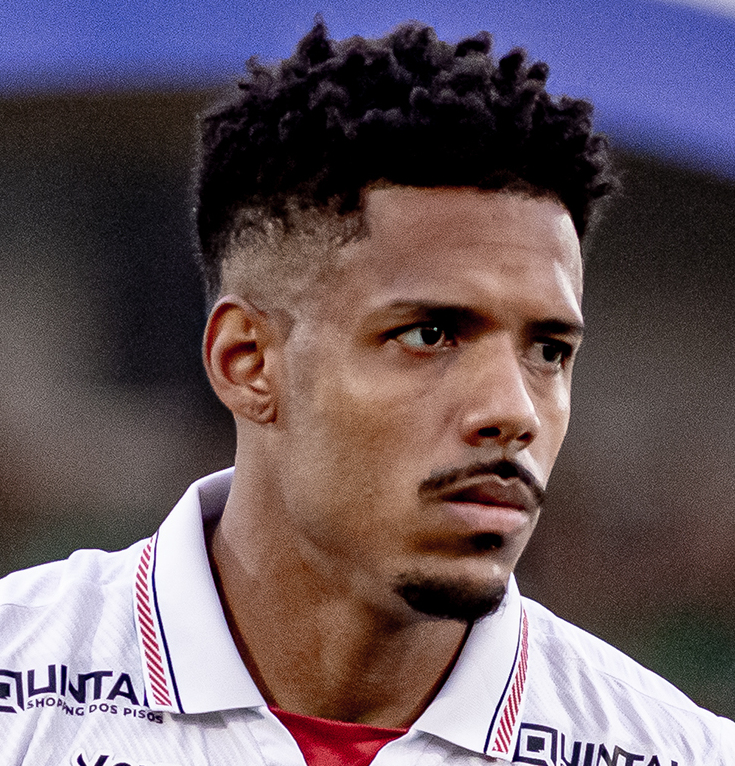
- Inocêncio with Botafogo-SP in 2026

Personal information
- Full name: Gabriel de Souza Inocêncio
- Date of birth: 20 August 1994 (age 32)
- Place of birth: Presidente Prudente, Brazil
- Height: 1.75 m (5 ft 9 in)
- Position: Full-back

Team information
- Current team: Botafogo-SP
- Number: 22

Youth career
- Toledo
- América-SP
- 2011: Grêmio Osasco
- 2011: Red Bull Brasil
- 2011: Grêmio Barueri
- 2012–2013: Grêmio

Senior career*
Years	Team	Apps	(Gls)
2013–2015	Monte Azul	20	(1)
2014	→ Olímpia (loan)	25	(7)
2015	→ Fernandópolis (loan)	10	(2)
2016	Inter de Lages	19	(1)
2016–2017	Mirassol	0	(0)
2017	→ Taubaté (loan)	10	(0)
2017	→ Maringá (loan)	0	(0)
2018	Barretos	19	(0)
2018	Noroeste	0	(0)
2019–2022	Monte Azul	31	(4)
2019	→ EC São Bernardo (loan)	0	(0)
2020	→ Boa Esporte (loan)	18	(1)
2021	→ São Bento (loan)	10	(1)
2021	→ Vitória (loan)	2	(0)
2022	→ São Bernardo FC (loan)	3	(0)
2022–2024	Água Santa	23	(0)
2023	→ Santos (loan)	22	(0)
2024	Juventude	17	(0)
2025	Chapecoense	22	(1)
2026–	Botafogo-SP	35	(1)
- * Club domestic league appearances and goals as of 18 November 2026

Gabriel de Souza Inocêncio (born 20 August 1994), known as Gabriel Inocêncio, is a Brazilian footballer who plays for Botafogo-SP. A full-back capable of playing in both flanks, he has also featured as a midfielder or a forward throughout his career.

== Club career ==
=== Early career ===
Born in Presidente Prudente, São Paulo, Inocêncio's first club was Toledo in the Paraná state, after playing for a hometown side named Centro de Treinamento Revelação (CTR). He later represented América-SP, Grêmio Osasco, Red Bull Brasil, Grêmio Barueri and Grêmio as a youth.

=== Monte Azul ===
In 2013, after finishing his formation, Inocêncio signed for Monte Azul, and made his senior debut on 8 September of that year by starting in a 3–1 home win over Mirassol, for the year's Copa Paulista. He scored his first senior goal on 5 October 2013, netting the opener in a 5–1 home routing of São Caetano.

==== Olímpia (loan) ====
After featuring rarely during the 2014 Campeonato Paulista Série A2, Inocêncio was loaned to Olímpia. With the club, he was mainly used as a forward or a midfielder, and scored seven times as they narrowly missed out on promotion from the Campeonato Paulista Segunda Divisão.

==== Fernandópolis (loan) ====
In August 2015, after being regularly used for Monte Azul in the year's Paulista Série A2, Inocêncio moved to Fernandópolis on loan until the end of the year's Paulista Segunda Divisão. He helped the side to achieve promotion to the Campeonato Paulista Série A3, but as a backup option.

=== Inter de Lages ===
On 17 December 2015, Inocêncio signed for Inter de Lages. A regular starter in the 2016 Campeonato Catarinense as the club finished sixth, he lost his starting spot during the 2016 Série D.

=== Mirassol ===
Inocêncio returned to his home state on 28 July 2016, and joined Mirassol. He played for the side during the year's Copa Paulista, scoring once in eight appearances as the club were knocked out in the second stage.

==== Taubaté (loan) ====
In December 2016, Inocêncio was loaned to Taubaté for the upcoming season. After spending his first two months as a backup, he became a starter in March, and was kept in the squad for the Copa Paulista.

==== Maringá (loan) ====
In September 2017, after Taubaté's elimination from the Copa Paulista, Inocêncio joined Maringá on loan. He won the Taça FPF with the club, featuring in four matches.

=== Barretos ===
On 1 November 2017, Inocêncio signed for Barretos for the ensuing Campeonato Paulista Série A3. At the club, he was converted into a right-back, playing more often than his midfield position, mainly due to the injury of starter Crystian.

=== Noroeste ===
On 12 July 2018, Inocêncio agreed to a deal with Noroeste. However, he would only feature in two matches for the club, both as a substitute, with the club being knocked out in the first round of the competition, and was released on 9 October.

Inocêncio was presented at Rio Preto on 23 November, but the move never materialized.

=== Monte Azul return ===
Inocêncio was registered back at his first club Monte Azul on 17 January 2019, where he would return to play mainly as a midfielder. He was a regular starter as the club achieved promotion to the Paulista Série A2.

==== EC São Bernardo (loan) ====
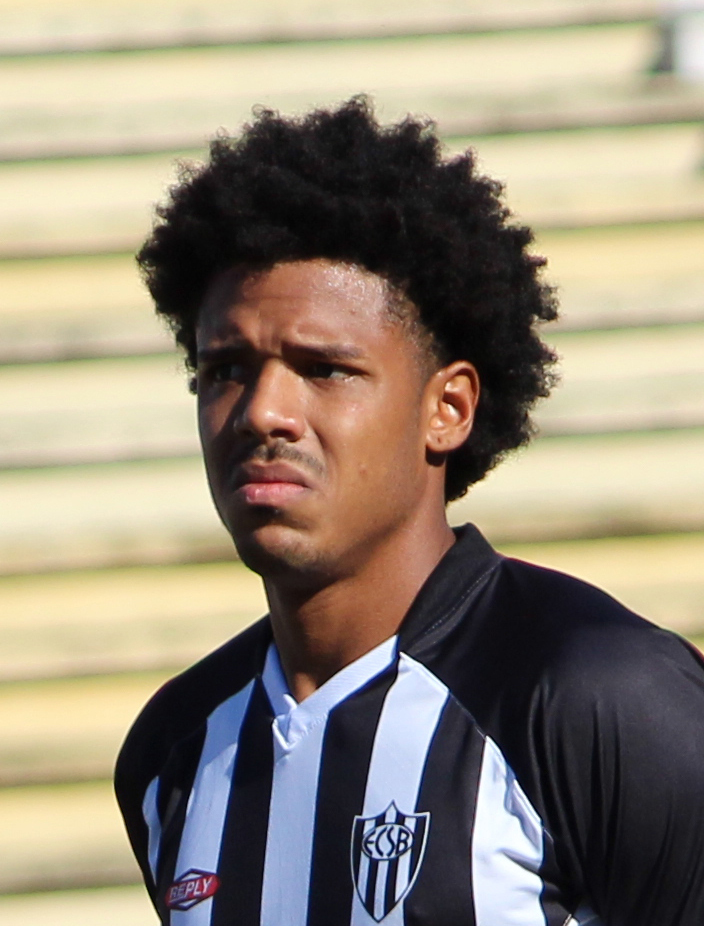
Inocêncio with EC São Bernardo in 2019

On 6 June 2019, Inocêncio was loaned to EC São Bernardo for the year's Copa Paulista. An undisputed starter, he contributed with two goals as the club reached the semifinals of the competition.

==== Boa Esporte (loan) ====
Inocêncio returned to AMA for the 2020 season, but was announced at Série C side Boa Esporte on 22 June 2020, also on loan. He was regularly used as the club suffered relegation.

==== São Bento (loan) ====
On 5 January 2021, still owned by Monte Azul, Inocêncio was confirmed as one of São Bento's eight additions. He received national attention after scoring a goal in a 1–1 draw against Corinthians at the Arena Corinthians and paying homage to his late father during the post-match interview.

==== Vitória (loan) ====
In May 2021, Inocêncio moved to Vitória, but was only registered on 15 June after fully recovering from a knee injury. However, in October, after just three matches, he was deemed surplus to requirements; the club eventually suffered relegation at the end of the season.

==== São Bernardo (loan) ====
On 19 January 2022, Inocêncio was announced at São Bernardo FC for the 2022 Campeonato Paulista. After missing out on several matches due to a broken hand, he was released on 6 April, after just three appearances.

=== Água Santa ===
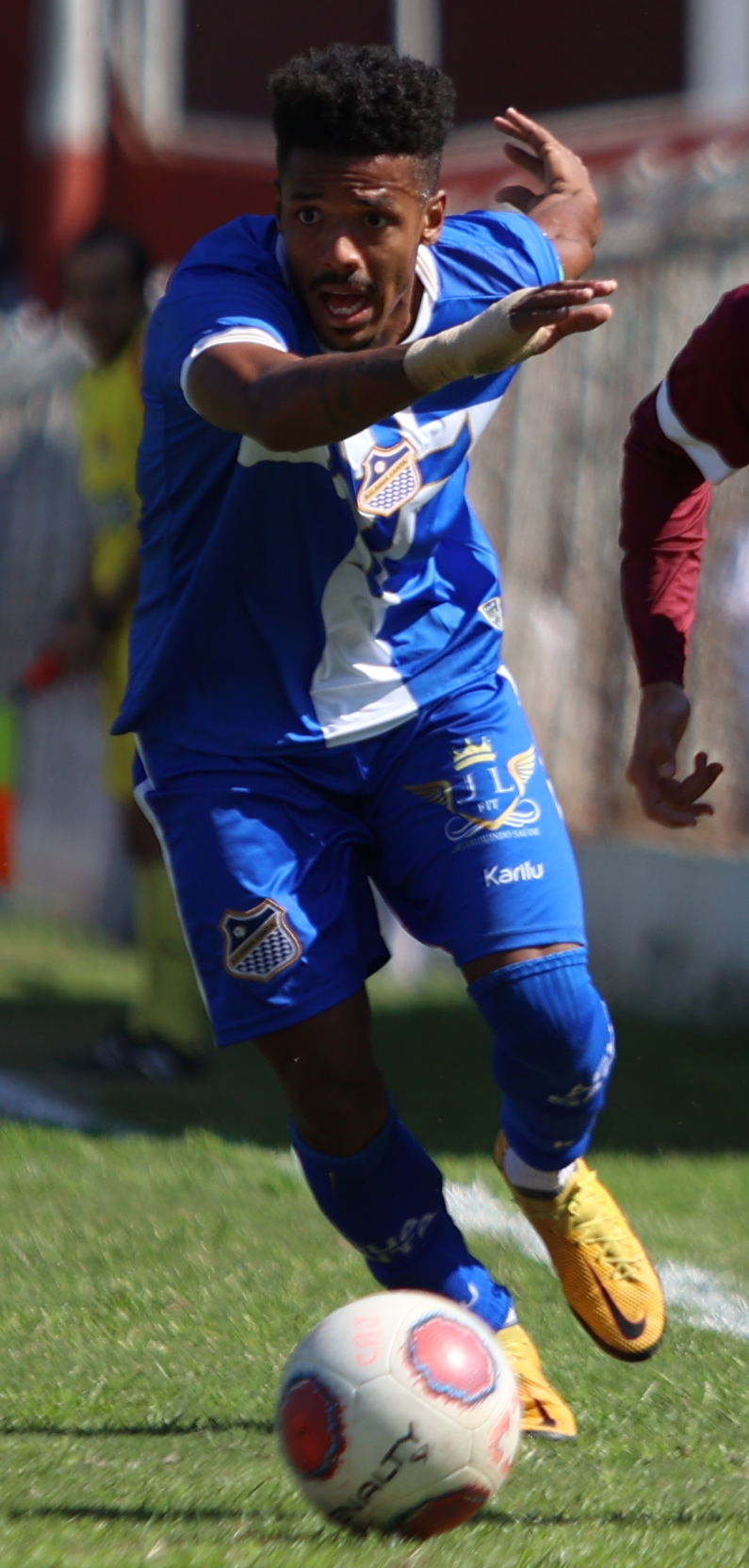
Inocêncio with Água Santa in 2022

On 7 June 2022, Inocêncio signed a contract with Água Santa. A regular starter during the Copa Paulista, he retained his starting spot during the 2023 Campeonato Paulista, but as a left back, as the club reached the finals of the competition for the first time ever.

==== Santos (loan) ====
On 12 April 2023, Série A side Santos announced Inocêncio on loan until the end of the year, with a buyout clause. He made his club – and top tier – debut eleven days later, replacing Nathan Santos late into a 0–0 home draw against Atlético Mineiro.

Despite facing competition with João Lucas and Nathan Santos, Inocêncio became a starter under head coach Odair Hellmann, being also an option for the left flank as Felipe Jonatan was sidelined. He would, however, lose his starting spot under subsequent head coaches Paulo Turra and Diego Aguirre.

=== Juventude ===
After playing the 2024 Campeonato Paulista back at Água Santa, Inocêncio was announced at Juventude in the top tier on 9 April 2024, signing a one-year deal. A backup to João Lucas, he featured in 17 league matches as the club avoided relegation.

=== Chapecoense ===
On 9 December 2024, Chapecoense announced the signing of Inocêncio on a one-year contract. Regularly used, he lost his starting spot to new signing Everton, only playing in 14 league matches as the club achieved promotion to the top tier.

=== Botafogo-SP ===
On 18 December 2025, Inocêncio moved to fellow second division side Botafogo-SP. A starter in the 2026 Campeonato Paulista, he was mainly used as a left-back.

== Career statistics ==
As of 10 February 2026

Club	Season	League			State League		Cup		Continental		Other		Total	
Club	Season	Division	Apps	Goals	Apps	Goals	Apps	Goals	Apps	Goals	Apps	Goals	Apps	Goals
Monte Azul	2013	Paulista A2	—		0	0	—		—		8 (Note: Appearance(s) in Copa Paulista)	1	8	1
Monte Azul	2014	Paulista A2	—		1	0	—		—		—		1	0
Monte Azul	2015	Paulista A2	—		19	1	—		—		—		19	1
Monte Azul	Total		—		20	1	—		—		8	1	28	2
Olímpia (loan)	2014	Paulista 2ª Divisão	—		25	7	—		—		—		25	7
Fernandópolis (loan)	2015	Paulista 2ª Divisão	—		10	2	—		—		—		10	2
Inter de Lages	2016	Série D	2	0	19	1	2	0	—		—		23	1
Mirassol	2016	Paulista A2	—		0	0	—		—		12	2	12	2
Taubaté	2017	Paulista A2	—		10	0	—		—		11	0	21	0
Maringá	2017	Paranaense Série Prata	—		0	0	—		—		4 (Note: Appearance(s) in Taça FPF)	0	4	0
Barretos	2018	Paulista A3	—		19	0	—		—		—		19	0
Noroeste	2018	Paulista A3	—		0	0	—		—		2	0	2	0
Monte Azul	2019	Paulista A3	—		20	2	—		—		—		20	2
Monte Azul	2020	Paulista A2	—		11	2	—		—		—		11	2
Monte Azul	Total		—		31	4	—		—		—		31	4
EC São Bernardo (loan)	2019	Paulista A3	—		0	0	—		—		23	2	23	2
Boa Esporte (loan)	2020	Série C	16	0	2	0	—		—		—		18	0
São Bento (loan)	2021	Série C	0	0	10	1	—		—		—		10	1
Vitória (loan)	2021	Série B	2	0	—		1	0	—		—		3	0
São Bernardo FC (loan)	2022	Série D	0	0	3	0	—		—		—		3	0
Água Santa	2022	Paulista	—		0	0	—		—		11	3	11	3
Água Santa	2023	Paulista	—		13	0	—		—		—		13	0
Água Santa	2024	Série D	0	0	10	0	1	0	—		—		11	0
Água Santa	Total		—		23	0	1	0	—		11	3	35	3
Santos (loan)	2023	Série A	22	0	—		3	0	—		—		25	0
Juventude	2024	Série A	17	0	—		—		—		2 (Note: Appearance(s) in Copa FGF)	0	19	0
Chapecoense	2025	Série B	14	1	8	0	—		—		2 (Note: Appearance(s) in Copa Santa Catarina)	0	24	1
Botafogo-SP	2026	Série B	0	0	6	0	—		—		—		6	0
Career total			73	1	185	17	7	0	0	0	75	8	341	25

== Honours ==
Maringá

- Taça FPF: 2017
