= Bruno Leonardo =

Brazilian footballer (born 1996)

Personal information
- Full name: Bruno Leonardo dos Santos Covas
- Date of birth: 2 June 1996 (age 30)
- Place of birth: Ribeirão Preto, Brazil
- Height: 1.87 m (6 ft 1 1/2 in)
- Position: Centre back

Team information
- Current team: Chapecoense
- Number: 33

Youth career
- Comercial-SP
- 2011: Olé Brasil
- 2012: Velo Clube
- 2012: Bahia
- 2013–2016: Santos

Senior career*
Years	Team	Apps	(Gls)
2017	Santos	0	(0)
2018–2019	Portuguesa Santista	4	(0)
2019	→ VOCEM (loan)	12	(0)
2020	Patrocinense	0	(0)
2020–2021	São Bento	29	(0)
2021–2022	Ferroviária	28	(3)
2022	Paysandu	14	(0)
2022–2023	Portuguesa	11	(2)
2023	→ Chapecoense (loan)	24	(2)
2024–	Chapecoense	97	(6)
- * Club domestic league appearances and goals as of 14:38, 1 June 2026 (UTC)

Bruno Leonardo dos Santos Covas (born 2 June 1996), known as Bruno Leonardo, is a Brazilian footballer who plays as a central defender for Chapecoense.

== Club career ==
Born in Ribeirão Preto, São Paulo, Bruno Leonardo started his career at Comercial-SP's youth categories. He subsequently represented Olé Brasil, Velo Clube and Bahia before joining Santos in 2013.

On 12 February 2016, Bruno Leonardo renewed his contract with Peixe until the end of the year. He left the club in March 2018, and signed for Portuguesa Santista.

Bruno Leonardo also spent a period on loan at VOCEM in the 2019 season before being named in the squad of Patrocinense for the 2020 Campeonato Mineiro in December of that year. On 4 March 2020, however, after being only an unused substitute, he returned to his native state after signing for São Bento.

On 1 June 2021, Bruno Leonardo was announced as the new addition of Ferroviária. He moved to Paysandu on 8 April 2022, and despite featuring regularly, he terminated his contract on a mutual agreement on 10 August.

On 12 August 2022, Bruno Leonardo signed for Portuguesa. On 28 March 2023, he was announced at Chapecoense on loan for the year's Série B.

On 20 December 2023, Chape announced Bruno Leonardo's contract renewal, with the player signing a one-year deal.

== Career statistics ==
As of 1 June 2026

Club	Season	League			State League		Cup		Continental		Other		Total	
Club	Season	Division	Apps	Goals	Apps	Goals	Apps	Goals	Apps	Goals	Apps	Goals	Apps	Goals
Santos	2017	Série A	0	0	—		0	0	—		4 (Note: Appearance(s) in Copa Paulista)	0	4	0
Portuguesa Santista	2018	Paulista A3	—		0	0	—		—		—		0	0
Portuguesa Santista	2019	Paulista A2	—		4	0	—		—		—		4	0
Portuguesa Santista	Total		—		4	0	—		—		—		4	0
VOCEM	2019	Paulista 2ª Divisão	—		12	0	—		—		—		12	0
Patrocinense	2020	Mineiro	—		0	0	—		—		—		0	0
São Bento	2020	Série C	9	0	9	0	—		—		—		18	0
São Bento	2021	Série D	0	0	11	0	—		—		—		11	0
São Bento	Total		9	0	20	0	—		—		—		29	0
Ferroviária	2021	Série D	19	2	—		—		—		—		19	2
Ferroviária	2022	Série D	0	0	9	1	1	0	—		—		10	1
Ferroviária	Total		19	2	9	1	1	0	—		—		29	3
Paysandu	2022	Série C	14	0	—		—		—		—		14	0
Portuguesa	2022	Paulista A2	—		—		—		—		5	0	5	0
Portuguesa	2023	Paulista	—		11	2	—		—		—		11	2
Portuguesa	Total		—		11	2	—		—		5	0	16	2
Chapecoense	2023	Série B	24	2	—		—		—		—		24	2
Chapecoense	2024	Série B	30	4	6	1	—		—		1 (Note: Appearance(s) in Copa Santa Catarina)	0	37	5
Chapecoense	2025	Série B	28	0	14	1	—		—		—		42	1
Chapecoense	2026	Série A	14	0	5	0	2	0	—		1 (Note: Appearance(s) in Copa Sul-Sudeste)	0	22	0
Chapecoense	Total		96	6	25	2	2	0	—		2	0	125	8
Total			138	8	81	5	3	0	0	0	11	0	233	13
