= Rosivan =

Brazilian footballer

Personal information
- Full name: Rosivan Macedo Soares
- Date of birth: 20 March 2000 (age 26)
- Place of birth: São Caetano de Odivelas, Brazil
- Height: 1.75 m (5 ft 9 in)
- Position: Midfielder

Team information
- Current team: Chapecoense
- Number: 55

Youth career
- Tuna Luso

Senior career*
Years	Team	Apps	(Gls)
2020	Tuna Luso	6	(0)
2021	Tapajós	7	(0)
2021	Paragominas	9	(0)
2021–2022	Amazônia Independente	18	(1)
2022–2023	Cordino	9	(0)
2022	→ Porto Velho (loan)	9	(2)
2022	→ Capitão Poço (loan)	9	(0)
2024	Capitão Poço	9	(1)
2025	União Suzano	14	(0)
2025	Canaã	8	(3)
2025–2026	Maranhão	33	(3)
2026–	Chapecoense	0	(0)
- * Club domestic league appearances and goals as of 17:28, 23 September 2026 (UTC)

Rosivan Macedo Soares (born 20 March 2000), simply known as Rosivan, is a Brazilian footballer who plays as a midfielder for Chapecoense.

== Career ==
Born in São Caetano de Odivelas, Pará, Rosivan began his career with local side Tuna Luso, signing a professional contract on 6 October 2020. The following 15 January, however, he moved to Tapajós.

Rosivan continued to play in his native state in the following years, representing Paragominas, Amazônia Independente and Capitão Poço, aside from spells at Cordino and Porto Velho. Ahead of the 2025 season, he joined União Suzano.

On 31 July 2025, after a short period at Canaã, Rosivan was announced at Maranhão. After quickly becoming a starter and helping in the club's promotion to the Série D, he renewed his contract on 9 October.

On 2 September 2026, Rosivan signed a two-year deal with Série A side Chapecoense.

== Career statistics ==
As of 23 September 2026

Club	Season	League			State League		Cup		Continental		Other		Total	
Club	Season	Division	Apps	Goals	Apps	Goals	Apps	Goals	Apps	Goals	Apps	Goals	Apps	Goals
Tuna Luso	2020	Paraense Série A2	—		6	0	—		—		—		6	0
Tapajós	2021	Paraense	—		7	0	—		—		—		7	0
Paragominas	2021	Série D	9	0	—		—		—		—		9	0
Amazônia Independente	2021	Paraense Série A2	—		10	1	—		—		—		10	1
Amazônia Independente	2022	Paraense	—		8	0	—		—		—		8	0
Amazônia Independente	Total		—		18	1	—		—		—		18	1
Cordino	2022	Maranhense	—		7	0	—		—		—		7	0
Cordino	2023	Série D	0	0	2	0	0	0	—		0	0	2	0
Cordino	Total		0	0	9	0	0	0	—		0	0	9	0
Porto Velho (loan)	2022	Série D	9	2	—		—		—		—		9	2
Capitão Poço (loan)	2022	Paraense Série A2	—		9	0	—		—		—		9	0
Capitão Poço	2024	Paraense Série A2	—		9	1	—		—		—		9	1
União Suzano	2025	Paulista A3	—		14	0	—		—		—		14	0
Canaã	2025	Paraense Série A2	—		8	3	—		—		—		8	3
Maranhão	2025	Série D	7	0	—		—		—		—		7	0
Maranhão	2026	Série C	17	3	9	0	2	0	—		5 (Note: Appearance(s) in Copa do Nordeste)	0	33	3
Maranhão	Total		24	3	9	0	2	0	—		5	0	40	3
Chapecoense	2026	Série A	0	0	—		—		—		—		0	0
Career total			42	5	89	5	2	0	0	0	5	0	138	10
