= 2025 Associação Chapecoense de Futebol season =

Associação Chapecoense de Futebol
2025 season
- Manager: Gilmar Dal Pozzo
- Stadium: Arena Condá
- Série B: 3rd
- Campeonato Catarinense: Runner-up
- Average home league attendance: 8,609

The 2025 season is the 52nd year in the history of Associação Chapecoense de Futebol. The team participated in the Campeonato Brasileiro Série B for the third consecutive season and the Campeonato Catarinense.

== Squad ==
=== Transfers Out ===
Pos.	Player	Transferred to	Fee	Date	Source
FW	(Brazil) Perotti	(Poland) Radomiak Radom	Free	9 January 2025	

== Exhibition matches ==
10 January 2025	Chapecoense	0–1	Concórdia
16:00 UTC−3			Thiago Cristian 75'

== Competitions ==
=== Overall record ===
Competition	First match	Last match	Starting round	Record							
Competition	First match	Last match	Starting round	Pld	W	D	L	GF	GA	GD	Win %
Série B	5 April 2025	22 November 2025	Matchday 1	18	9	2	7	25	18	+7	50.00
Campeonato Catarinense	15 January 2025			15	4	10	1	19	15	+4	26.67
Total				33	13	12	8	44	33	+11	39.39

Last updated: 19 January 2025
Source: Competitions

=== Série B ===
==== League table ====
Pos	Team	Pld	W	D	L	GF	GA	GD	Pts	Promotion or relegation
1	Coritiba (C, P)	38	19	11	8	39	23	+16	68	Promotion to 2026 Campeonato Brasileiro Série A
2	Athletico Paranaense (P)	38	19	8	11	53	43	+10	65	Promotion to 2026 Campeonato Brasileiro Série A
3	Chapecoense (P)	38	18	8	12	52	35	+17	62	Promotion to 2026 Campeonato Brasileiro Série A
4	Remo (P)	38	16	14	8	51	39	+12	62	Promotion to 2026 Campeonato Brasileiro Série A
5	Criciúma	38	17	10	11	47	33	+14	61	

Source: CBF
Rules for classification: 1) points; 2) wins; 3) goal difference; 4) goals scored; 5) head-to-head results (only between 2 teams); 6) fewest red cards; 7) fewest yellow cards; 8) drawing of lots.
(C) Champions; (P) Promoted

==== Matches ====
5 April 2025 1	CRB	1–0	Chapecoense	Maceió
16:00 (UTC-3)	David 9'			Stadium: Estádio Rei Pelé

12 April 2025 2	Chapecoense	1–2	Coritiba	Chapecó
17:00 (UTC-3)	Jorge Jiménez (yellow card) 54'; Bruno Matias (yellow card) 55'; Mário Sérgio (yellow card) 71' (goal) 78'	Report	Nicolas Careca 48' (yellow card) 66'; Alex Silva 60' (yellow card) 90+5' (yellow-red card) 90+7'; Júnior Brumado (yellow card) 90+3'; Ruan Assis (yellow card) 90+5'; Carlos de Pena (yellow card) 90+13'	Stadium: Arena Condá; Attendance: 6,866; Referee: (Brazil) Bruno Pereira

16 April 2025 3	Paysandu	0–2	Chapecoense	Belém
21:00 (UTC-3)	Matheus Vargas (yellow card) 18'; André (yellow card) 45+4'	Report	João Paulo (yellow card) 8' (goal) 36'; Rafael Carvalheira (yellow card) 16'; Maílton 26'	Stadium: Mangueirão; Attendance: 11,792; Referee: (Brazil) Wagner do Nascimento Magalhães

20 April 2025 4	Chapecoense	1–0	Athletic	Chapecó
19:00 (UTC-3)	Eduardo Person (yellow card) 23'; David Braga 56' (o.g.)	Report	Gabriel Ferreira Dias (yellow card) 2'; Diego Fumaça (yellow card) 67'	Stadium: Arena Condá; Attendance: 5,431; Referee: (Brazil) Maguielson Lima Barbosa

25 April 2025 5	Vila Nova	1–0	Chapecoense	Goiânia
22:00 (UTC-3)	Facundo Labandeira 48'; Halls (yellow card) 77'	Report	Everton (yellow card) 90+7'	Stadium: Estádio Onésio Brasileiro Alvarenga; Attendance: 6,203; Referee: (Brazil) João Vitor Gobi

27 July 2025 19	Atlético Goianiense	0–0	Chapecoense

3 August 2025 20	Chapecoense	3–2	CRB

8 August 2025 21	Coritiba	0–0	Chapecoense

17 August 2025 22	Chapecoense	2–0	Paysandu

=== Campeonato Catarinense ===
==== Results by round ====
Round	1	2
Ground	A	H
Result	D	W
Position		

Updated to match(es) played on 19 January 2025. Source:
A = Away; H = Home; W = Win; D = Draw; L = Loss

15 January 2025 1	Caravaggio	1–1	Chapecoense	Nova Veneza
19:30 UTC−3	51'		58'	Stadium: Estádio da Montanha

19 January 2025 2	Chapecoense	1–0	Marcílio Dias
16:00 UTC−3	Mário Sérgio (penalty missed) 45+2', 58'

22 January 2025 3	Brusque	1–2	Chapecoense	Brusque
19:30 UTC−3	Diego Mathias (yellow card) 5' (goal) 60'; Ianson (yellow card) 42'	Report	Mário Bahia 25'; Bruno Matias (yellow card) 44'; Maílton (yellow card) 48'; Marcinho (yellow card) 63'; Rafael Carvalheira 74'; Léo (yellow card) 81'	Stadium: Estádio Augusto Bauer; Attendance: 2,125; Referee: (Brazil) Igor da Silva Albuquerque

26 January 2025 4	Concórdia	2–1	Chapecoense	Concórdia
18:00	Foguinho (yellow card) 23'; Pericles 60' (yellow card) 90+3'; Matheus Galdezani (yellow card) 67'; Wesley Pinheiro 70'	Report	Vinicius Balieiro (yellow card) 25'; Rafael Carvalheira (yellow card) 32'; Ítalo (yellow card) 50'; Mário Bahia 89'	Stadium: Estádio Domingos Machado de Lima; Attendance: 939; Referee: (Brazil) Braulio da Silva Machado

29 January 2025 5	Chapecoense	0–0	Avaí	Chapecó
20:30	Maílton (yellow card) 90'	Report	Pedrão (yellow card) 43'; Jamerson (yellow card) 90'	Stadium: Arena Condá; Attendance: 1,465; Referee: (Brazil) Cinesio Mendes Junior

1 February 2025 6	Chapecoense	0–0	Criciúma	Chapecó
16:00		Report		Stadium: Arena Condá; Attendance: 1,356; Referee: (Brazil) Rafael Traci

5 February 2025 7	Barra	1–1	Chapecoense	Itajaí
19:30	Juliano 31'; Natanael (yellow card) 89'	Report	Gabriel Inocêncio (yellow card) 45'; Eduardo Doma 61'; Bruno Leonardo (yellow card) 63'	Stadium: Arena Barra FC; Attendance: 1,252; Referee: (Brazil) Luiz Silveira Tisne

9 February 2025 8	Chapecoense	1–1	Santa Catarina	Chapecó
17:00	Walter Clar 59'; Matheus Belém (yellow card) 65'; Giovanni Augusto (yellow card) 73'; Jhonnathan (yellow card) 83'; Rubens Tadeu (yellow card) 88'; Pedro Victor (yellow card) 90+2'	Report	Zé Leandro (yellow card) 45'; Alex Gonçalves 50' (yellow card) 65'	Stadium: Arena Condá; Attendance: 934; Referee: (Brazil) Franciel Dos Santos

13 February 2025 9	Figueirense	2–4	Chapecoense	Florianópolis
20:30	João Lucas (yellow card) 21' (goal) 54'; Nicolas 38'; Matheus Mascarenhas (yellow card) 77'; Leonardo Maia (yellow card) 90+1'	Report	Jorge Roa (yellow card) 15'; Marcinho 18' 45' (yellow card) 79'; Giovanni Augusto 31' (yellow card) 45'; Pedro Victor (yellow card) 56'; Bruno Leonardo 74'	Stadium: Estádio Orlando Scarpelli; Attendance: 7,531; Referee: (Brazil) Braulio da Silva Machado

16 February 2025 10	Hercílio Luz	2–2	Chapecoense	Tubarão
17:00	Gabriel Silva 1'; Alex Henrique 78'	Report	Dentinho 28' (yellow card) 83'; Giovanni Augusto (yellow card) 55'; Mário Bahia 64' (yellow card) 70'; Bruno Leonardo (yellow card) 76'; Pedro Victor (yellow card) 90'; Maílton (yellow card) 90+2'	Stadium: Estádio Aníbal Torres Costa; Attendance: 661; Referee: (Brazil) Gustavo Ervino Bauermann

22 February 2025 11	Chapecoense	1–1	Joinville	Chapecó
16:30	Maílton 45'	Report	Cristian Renato 61'; Danilo Belão (yellow card) 90+4'	Stadium: Arena Condá; Attendance: 998; Referee: (Brazil) William Machado Steffen
