= Mancha (footballer) =

Brazilian footballer

Personal information
- Full name: Gianluca Piola Minozzo
- Date of birth: 13 February 2001 (age 25)
- Place of birth: Concórdia, Brazil
- Height: 1.78 m (5 ft 10 in)
- Position: Left back

Team information
- Current team: Chapecoense
- Number: 6

Youth career
- 2013–2021: Chapecoense

Senior career*
Years	Team	Apps	(Gls)
2021–	Chapecoense	74	(3)
2022	→ Portimonense (loan)	0	(0)
- * Club domestic league appearances and goals as of 11 August 2025

Gianluca Piola Minozzo (born 13 February 2001), commonly known as Mancha, is a Brazilian footballer who plays as a left back for Chapecoense.

== Club career ==
Mancha was born in Concórdia, Santa Catarina, and joined Chapecoense's youth setup at the age of 12. On 22 February 2021, shortly after being promoted to the first team, he renewed his contract until December 2023.

Mancha made his senior debut on 11 March 2021, starting in a 2–1 Campeonato Catarinense home win against Avaí. His Série A debut occurred on 17 June, as he started in a 1–1 away draw against São Paulo.

On 12 January 2022, Mancha moved to Portimonense, but was assigned to the under-23 team. He returned to Chape in June, but started to feature regularly in the 2023 season.

== Career statistics ==
As of 11 January 2024

Club	Season	League			State League		Cup		Continental		Other		Total	
Club	Season	Division	Apps	Goals	Apps	Goals	Apps	Goals	Apps	Goals	Apps	Goals	Apps	Goals
Chapecoense	2021	Série A	8	0	3	0	0	0	—		—		11	0
Chapecoense	2023	Série B	19	2	4	0	0	0	—		—		23	2
Chapecoense	2024	Série B	0	0	0	0	0	0	—		—		0	0
Career total			27	2	7	0	0	0	0	0	0	0	34	2
