= Matheus Aurélio =

Brazilian footballer

Personal information
- Full name: Matheus Aurélio Palhares Guimarães
- Date of birth: 23 June 1999 (age 27)
- Place of birth: São José do Rio Preto, Brazil
- Height: 1.84 m (6 ft 1/2 in)
- Position: Goalkeeper

Team information
- Current team: Chapecoense (on loan from Tombense)

Youth career
- 2013–2015: Tanabi
- 2015–2017: Mirassol

Senior career*
Years	Team	Apps	(Gls)
2017–2021	Mirassol	19	(0)
2019	→ Náutico (loan)	0	(0)
2021–2024	Hercílio Luz	31	(0)
2022	→ Caxias do Sul (loan)	1	(0)
2025–	Tombense	37	(0)
2026–	→ Chapecoense (loan)	0	(0)
- * Club domestic league appearances and goals as of 9 April 2026

Matheus Aurélio Palhares Guimarães (born 23 June 1999), known as Matheus Aurélio is a Brazilian footballer who plays for Tombense as a goalkeeper for Chapecoense, on loan from Tombense.

== Career statistics ==
As of 16 July 2021

Club	Season	League			State League		Cup		Conmebol		Other		Total	
Club	Season	Division	Apps	Goals	Apps	Goals	Apps	Goals	Apps	Goals	Apps	Goals	Apps	Goals
Mirassol	2017	Paulista	—		—		—		—		16 (Note: Appearance(s) in Copa Paulista)	0	16	0
Mirassol	2018	Série D	0	0	0	0	—		—		18	0	18	0
Mirassol	2019	Paulista	—		12	0	—		—		2	0	15	0
Total			0	0	12	0	—		—		36	0	48	0
Náutico (loan)	2019	Série C	0	0	—		—		—		—		0	0
Mirassol	2019	Paulista	—		—		—		—		3	0	3	0
Mirassol	2020	Série D	0	0	0	0	—		—		—		0	0
Mirassol	2021	Série C	7	0	0	0	0	0	—		—		7	0
Career total			7	0	12	0	0	0	0	0	39	0	58	0

== Honours ==
Náutico

- Campeonato Brasileiro Série C: 2019

Mirassol

- Campeonato Brasileiro Série D: 2020
