= Túlio Eduardo =

Brazilian footballer

Personal information
- Full name: Túlio Eduardo Silva de Oliveira
- Date of birth: 27 October 2004 (age 22)
- Place of birth: Recife, Brazil
- Height: 1.87 m (6 ft 2 in)
- Position: Forward

Team information
- Current team: Chapecoense
- Number: 9

Youth career
- 2021–2022: Retrô
- 2023–2024: Santa Cruz

Senior career*
Years	Team	Apps	(Gls)
2023	Íbis	7	(0)
2024–2025	Santa Cruz	3	(0)
2024	→ Rio Grande SAF (loan)	7	(5)
2025	Nação	7	(2)
2025	Baraúnas	4	(1)
2026	Bandeirante	11	(3)
2026	Decisão	9	(8)
2026–	Chapecoense	1	(1)
- * Club domestic league appearances and goals as of 13:31, 10 August 2026 (UTC)

Túlio Eduardo Silva de Oliveira (born 27 October 2004), known as Túlio Eduardo or just Túlio, is a Brazilian footballer who plays as a forward for Chapecoense.

== Career ==
Born in Recife, Pernambuco, Túlio began his career with Retrô, but made his senior debut with Íbis in the 2023 Campeonato Pernambucano. He subsequently moved to Santa Cruz, initially for the under-20 team, before being loaned out to Rio Grande SAF in August 2024.

Back to Santa for the 2025 season, Túlio only featured in four matches for the first team before being released on 14 April of that year. He subsequently represented Nação and Baraúnas for the remainder of the year, before being announced at Campeonato Paulista Série A3 side Bandeirante on 8 December.

In March 2026, Túlio signed for Série D club Decisão, and scored eight goals in just nine matches for the club (including a hat-trick against former side Retrô). On 13 July, he moved straight to the Série A, signing a contract with Chapecoense until the end of the year.

Túlio made his debut in the top tier of Brazilian football on 8 August 2026, coming on as a first-half substitute for injured Max Alves and scored his team's only in a 2–1 away loss to Coritiba.

== Career statistics ==
As of 10 August 2026

Club	Season	League			State League		Cup		Continental		Other		Total	
Club	Season	Division	Apps	Goals	Apps	Goals	Apps	Goals	Apps	Goals	Apps	Goals	Apps	Goals
Íbis	2023	Pernambucano	—		7	0	—		—		—		7	0
Rio Grande SAF	2024	Potiguar 2ª Divisão	—		7	5	—		—		—		7	5
Santa Cruz	2025	Série D	—		3	0	—		—		1 (Note: Appearance(s) in Copa do Nordeste)	0	4	0
Nação	2025	Catarinense Série B	—		7	2	—		—		6 (Note: Appearance(s) in Copa Santa Catarina)	0	13	2
Baraúnas	2025	Potiguar 2ª Divisão	—		4	1	—		—		—		4	1
Bandeirante	2026	Paulista A3	—		11	3	—		—		—		11	3
Decisão	2026	Série D	9	8	—		—		—		—		9	8
Chapecoense	2026	Série A	1	1	—		1	0	—		—		2	1
Career total			10	9	39	11	1	0	0	0	7	0	57	20
