= Mailson =

Mailson is a given name. It may refer to:

- Maílson da Nóbrega (born 1942), Brazilian economist
- Maílson Alves (born 1988), Brazilian football defender
- Mailson (footballer, born 1990), Mailson Francisco de Farías, Brazilian football winger
- Mailson Lima (born 1994), Cape Verdean football winger
- Mailson (footballer, born 1996), Mailson Tenório dos Santos, Brazilian football goalkeeper
