= Eduardo Doma =

Brazilian footballer

Personal information
- Full name: Eduardo Vinicius Domachowski
- Date of birth: 29 August 1998 (age 28)
- Place of birth: Curitiba, Brazil
- Height: 1.87 m (6 ft 2 in)
- Position: Centre-back

Team information
- Current team: Chapecoense
- Number: 3

Youth career
- Criciúma
- 2017–2018: Brasil de Pelotas

Senior career*
Years	Team	Apps	(Gls)
2018	Brasil de Pelotas	0	(0)
2018	→ Esportivo (loan)	9	(1)
2018	→ Farroupilha (loan)	0	(0)
2019–2022	Cianorte	49	(2)
2019	→ São Borja (loan)	0	(0)
2020	→ Cascavel (loan)	6	(0)
2022–2023	Vila Nova	46	(3)
2024	Hope Internacional	0	(0)
2024	→ Chapecoense (loan)	8	(1)
2024–	Chapecoense	94	(5)
- * Club domestic league appearances and goals as of 14:44, 1 June 2026 (UTC)

Eduardo Vinicius Domachowski (born 29 August 1998), known as Eduardo Doma, is a Brazilian footballer who plays as a centre-back for Chapecoense.

== Career ==
Born in Curitiba, Paraná, Doma represented Criciúma and Brasil de Pelotas as a youth. He made his senior debut in the 2018 Campeonato Gaúcho Série A2 while on loan at Esportivo, and also played for Farroupilha in that year.

On 20 December 2018, Doma was announced at Cianorte. He failed to make an appearance for the club during his first year, also serving a loan stint at São Borja, but became a regular starter in the 2020 Campeonato Paranaense.

On 28 August 2020, Doma was presented at FC Cascavel on loan for the 2020 Série D. Back to Cianorte for the 2021 campaign, he was an undisputed starter for the side.

On 24 March 2022, Doma agreed to a contract with Série B side Vila Nova. A backup option in his first year, he became a regular starter in his second.

On 21 December 2023, Doma was announced at Chapecoense on a one-year loan deal from Hope Internacional. In May, the club exercised his buyout clause, paying R$ 350,000 for 50% of his economic rights.

== Career statistics ==
As of 1 June 2026

Club	Season	League			State League		Cup		Continental		Other		Total	
Club	Season	Division	Apps	Goals	Apps	Goals	Apps	Goals	Apps	Goals	Apps	Goals	Apps	Goals
Brasil de Pelotas	2018	Série B	0	0	—		—		—		—		0	0
Esportivo (loan)	2018	Gaúcho Série A2	—		9	1	—		—		—		9	1
Farroupilha (loan)	2018	Gaúcho Série B	—		—		—		—		5 (Note: Appearance(s) in Copa FGF)	0	5	0
Cianorte	2019	Série D	0	0	0	0	—		—		—		0	0
Cianorte	2020	Paranaense	—		12	0	—		—		—		12	0
Cianorte	2021	Série D	13	1	11	0	3	0	—		—		27	1
Cianorte	2022	Série D	0	0	13	1	—		—		—		13	1
Cianorte	Total		13	1	36	1	3	0	—		—		52	2
São Borja (loan)	2019	Gaúcho Série A2	—		—		—		—		10	0	10	0
Cascavel (loan)	2020	Série D	6	0	—		—		—		—		6	0
Vila Nova	2022	Série B	2	0	—		0	0	—		0	0	2	0
Vila Nova	2023	Série B	35	2	9	1	2	0	—		2 (Note: Appearance(s) in Copa Verde)	1	48	4
Vila Nova	Total		37	2	9	1	2	0	—		2	1	50	4
Chapecoense	2024	Série B	23	0	6	1	0	0	—		1 (Note: Appearance(s) in Copa Santa Catarina)	0	30	1
Chapecoense	2025	Série B	32	3	14	1	—		—		—		46	4
Chapecoense	2026	Série A	15	1	12	0	2	0	—		1 (Note: Appearance(s) in Copa Sul-Sudeste)	0	30	1
Chapecoense	Total		70	4	32	2	2	0	—		2	0	106	6
Career total			126	7	86	5	7	0	0	0	19	1	238	13
