= Nivaldo (footballer, born 1974) =

Brazilian footballer

Personal information
- Full name: Nivaldo Francisco Dos Santos
- Date of birth: 14 March 1974 (age 52)
- Place of birth: Torres, Brazil
- Height: 1.86 m (6 ft 1 in)
- Position: Goalkeeper

Senior career*
Years	Team	Apps	(Gls)
1995–1997	Araranguá		
1998–2000	Guarani-VA	13	(0)
2001–2006	Esportivo	83	(0)
2006–2016	Chapecoense	83	(0)
Total		179	(0)
- * Club domestic league appearances and goals

José Nivaldo Martins Constante (born 14 March 1974), better known as Nivaldo, is a Brazilian retired footballer who played as a goalkeeper.

== Club career ==
Born in Torres, Rio Grande do Sul, Nivaldo made his senior debuts with Araranguá Esporte Clube in 1995. He was released in the end of the year, and subsequently played for Campeonato Gaúcho third level sides, also appearing for some clubs in Nordeste.

Nivaldo joined Guarani de Venâncio Aires in 1998, being a regular starter for the side. In December 2000 he moved to Esportivo Bento Gonçalves, being an ever-present figure for the club during his six-year spell.

On 11 April 2006 Nivaldo joined Chapecoense, with the club in a financial crisis. With the side he was a starter during the Série D, Série C and Série B promotion campaigns, making his debut in the latter division on 25 May 2013, in a 4–1 away win against Boa Esporte.

Nivaldo remained at Chape during the 2014 season, but as a backup to Danilo. He made his Série A debut on 30 November 2014, aged already 40, coming on as a second-half substitute for the former in a 1–1 home draw against Cruzeiro. He was also the first goalkeeper ever to play in all Brazilian four divisions, and the third player of his club.

Nivaldo did not board LaMia Airlines Flight 2933 for the 2016 Copa Sudamericana Finals, which crashed and killed 19 of his teammates. After the tragedy, he announced his retirement from football. With the Brazilian Football Confederation announcing that Chapecoense must fulfill their final fixture of the 2016 Série A, Nivaldo announced his intention to compete in a final game in tribute to his teammates; as the last match against Atlético Mineiro was not disputed, he retired after the tournament's end.

== Career statistics ==
As of 4 December 2016

Club	Season	League			State League		Cup		Continental		Other		Total	
Club	Season	Division	Apps	Goals	Apps	Goals	Apps	Goals	Apps	Goals	Apps	Goals	Apps	Goals
Chapecoense	2006	Catarinense	—		23	0	—		—		8 (Note: Appearance(s) in Copa Santa Catarina)	0	31	0
Chapecoense	2007	Série C	6	0	24	0	—		—		8	0	38	0
Chapecoense	2008	Catarinense	—		24	0	3	0	—		4	0	31	0
Chapecoense	2009	Série D	14	0	26	0	—		—		—		40	0
Chapecoense	2010	Série C	10	0	18	0	3	0	—		10	0	41	0
Chapecoense	2011	Série C	0	0	1	0	—		—		—		1	0
Chapecoense	2012	Série C	16	0	16	0	2	0	—		—		34	0
Chapecoense	2013	Série B	30	0	22	0	—		—		—		52	0
Chapecoense	2014	Série A	2	0	9	0	0	0	—		—		11	0
Chapecoense	2015	Série A	5	0	14	0	1	0	1 (Note: Appearance(s) in Copa Sudamericana)	0	—		21	0
Chapecoense	2016	Série A	0	0	0	0	0	0	0	0	—		0	0
Chapecoense	Subtotal		83	0	176	0	9	0	1	0	30	0	299	0
Career total			83	0	176	0	9	0	1	0	30	0	299	0

== Honours ==
Chapecoense

- Copa Santa Catarina: 2006
- Campeonato Catarinense: 2007, 2011, 2016
- Copa Sudamericana: 2016
