= Laranjeiras do Sul =

Coordinates: 25°25′S 52°25′W

- Municipality
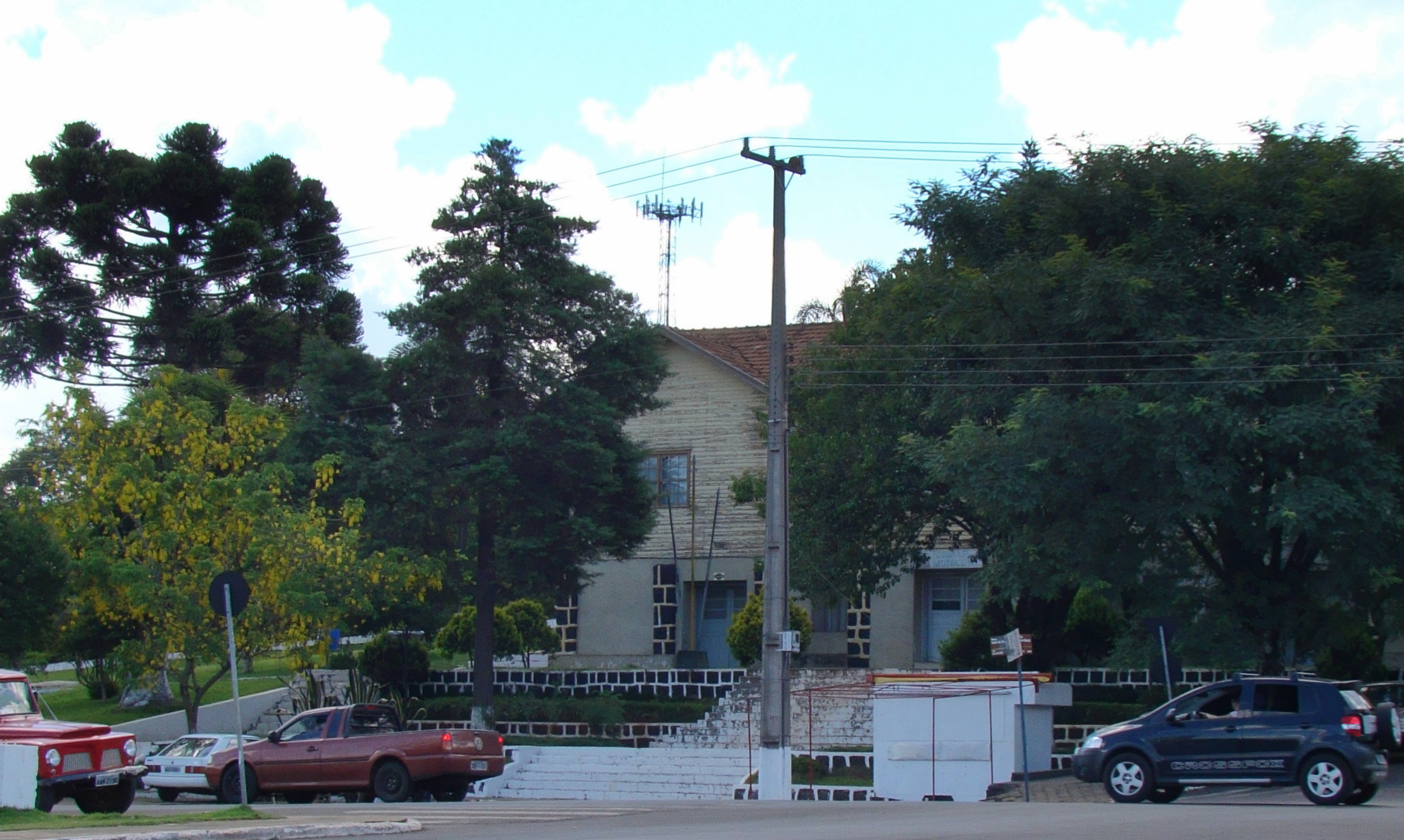

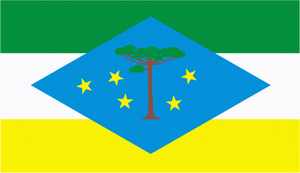
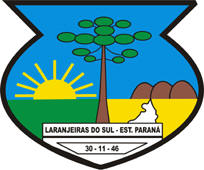
- Flag Coat of arms
- Interactive map of Laranjeiras do Sul
- Country: Brazil
- Region: Southern
- State: Paraná
- Mesoregion: Centro-Sul Paranaense

Population (2020)
  - Total: 32,139
- Time zone: UTC−3 (BRT)

Laranjeiras do Sul is a municipality in the state of Paraná in the Southern Region of Brazil.

It was once the territorial capital of Iguaçu.

== Climate ==
Climate data for Laranjeiras do Sul, elevation 880 m (2,890 ft), (1974–2007)
Month	Jan	Feb	Mar	Apr	May	Jun	Jul	Aug	Sep	Oct	Nov	Dec	Year
Record high °C (°F)	33.8 (92.8)	33.6 (92.5)	35.4 (95.7)	31.0 (87.8)	29.9 (85.8)	27.6 (81.7)	29.8 (85.6)	31.8 (89.2)	34.0 (93.2)	33.0 (91.4)	37.5 (99.5)	35.9 (96.6)	37.5 (99.5)
Mean daily maximum °C (°F)	28.2 (82.8)	27.9 (82.2)	27.5 (81.5)	25.1 (77.2)	21.7 (71.1)	20.6 (69.1)	20.9 (69.6)	23.1 (73.6)	23.7 (74.7)	25.6 (78.1)	26.8 (80.2)	27.7 (81.9)	24.9 (76.8)
Daily mean °C (°F)	22.5 (72.5)	22.0 (71.6)	21.4 (70.5)	19.0 (66.2)	15.9 (60.6)	14.8 (58.6)	14.7 (58.5)	16.5 (61.7)	17.4 (63.3)	19.5 (67.1)	20.8 (69.4)	21.9 (71.4)	18.9 (66.0)
Mean daily minimum °C (°F)	18.0 (64.4)	17.8 (64.0)	16.9 (62.4)	14.6 (58.3)	11.6 (52.9)	10.7 (51.3)	10.3 (50.5)	11.5 (52.7)	12.5 (54.5)	14.5 (58.1)	15.7 (60.3)	17.2 (63.0)	14.3 (57.7)
Record low °C (°F)	10.3 (50.5)	8.2 (46.8)	5.8 (42.4)	2.0 (35.6)	−1.3 (29.7)	−2.0 (28.4)	−5.4 (22.3)	−2.2 (28.0)	−0.5 (31.1)	3.4 (38.1)	6.0 (42.8)	8.4 (47.1)	−5.4 (22.3)
Average precipitation mm (inches)	189.7 (7.47)	189.0 (7.44)	127.0 (5.00)	155.1 (6.11)	179.0 (7.05)	152.6 (6.01)	131.6 (5.18)	103.2 (4.06)	166.3 (6.55)	237.3 (9.34)	169.0 (6.65)	194.1 (7.64)	1,993.9 (78.5)
Average precipitation days (≥ 1.0 mm)	14	14	12	9	9	9	9	8	11	13	11	13	132
Average relative humidity (%)	75	77	76	76	76	75	71	66	68	71	69	72	73
Mean monthly sunshine hours	211.6	188.4	212.3	204.5	196.0	179.9	204.7	211.2	181.9	200.1	216.1	217.3	2,424
Source: IDR-Paraná

== See also ==
- List of municipalities in Paraná
