= Arena Condá =

Stadium in Chapecó, Brazil

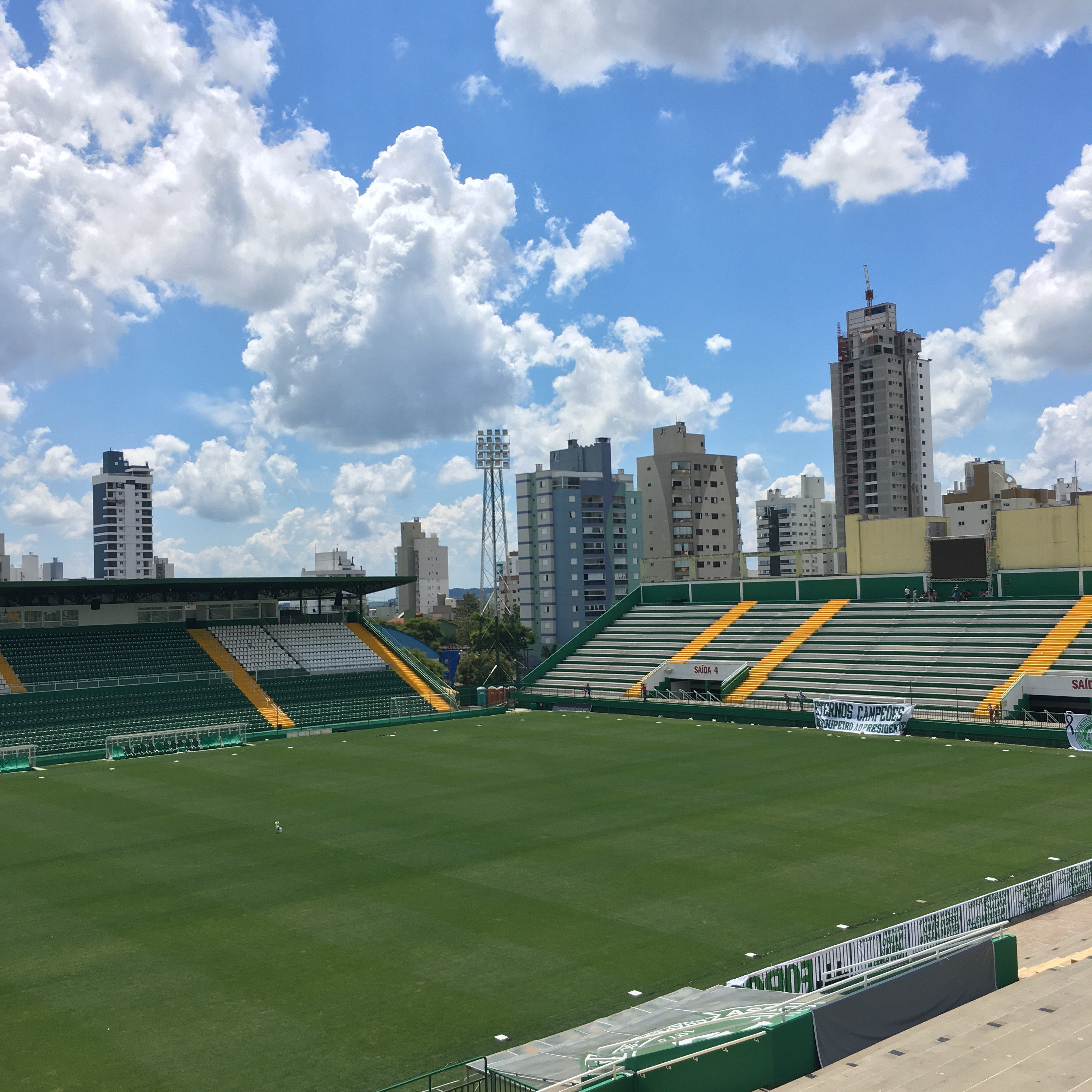
- Sisbrace
- Interactive map of Arena Condá
- Former names: Estádio Índio Condá
- Location: Chapecó, Santa Catarina, Brazil
- Coordinates: 27°06′15″S 52°36′25″W
- Owner: Chapecó City Hall
- Operator: Chapecoense
- Capacity: 20,089
- Surface: Grass
- Record attendance: 19,175 (vs Grêmio, 11 May 2014)
- Field size: 105 by 68 metres (114.8 yd × 74.4 yd)

Construction
- Opened: 1976
- Renovated: 2008
- Expanded: 2008
- Cost: R$ 25m (2008 renovation)

Tenant
- Chapecoense (1976–Present)

Arena Condá is a stadium in Chapecó, Brazil. It has a capacity of 20,089 spectators. It is the home of Brazilian Série A club Associação Chapecoense de Futebol.

The Arena Condá was inaugurated on 1 February 2009. The inaugural match occurred in the 2009 Campeonato Catarinense, against Brusque, which ended in a 4–1 victory. Nenén was responsible for scoring the first goal at the Arena and the highest attendance until now was in the match against the Grêmio, in 2014, with a crowd of 19,175 people.

== Layout ==
Number of seats: 1,560
Social grandstand capacity: 4,099
East grandstand capacity: 6,718
South grandstand capacity: 3,650
North grandstand capacity: 4,062
