= Realeza =

Coordinates: 25°46′01″S 53°31′37″W

- Municipality
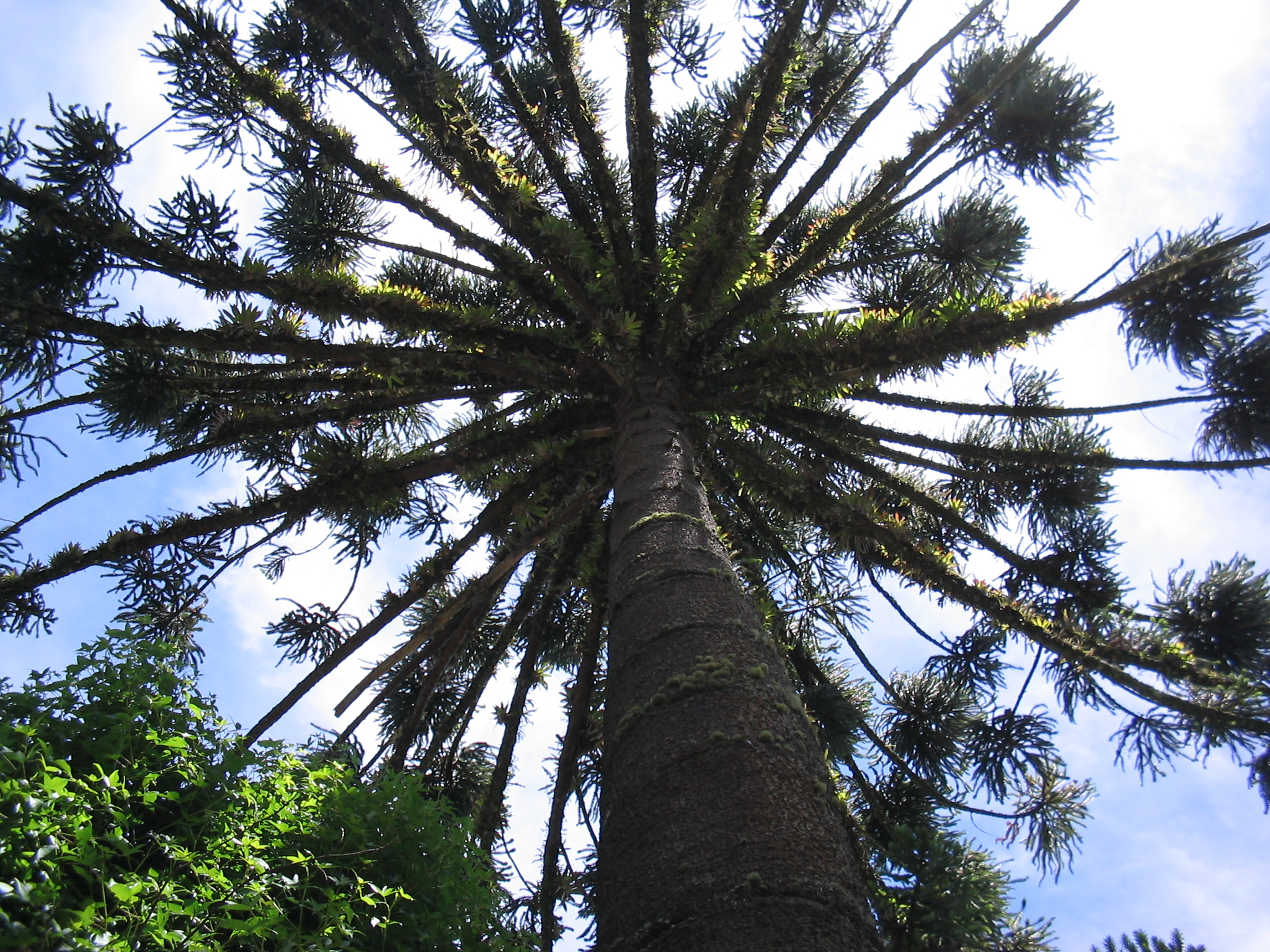

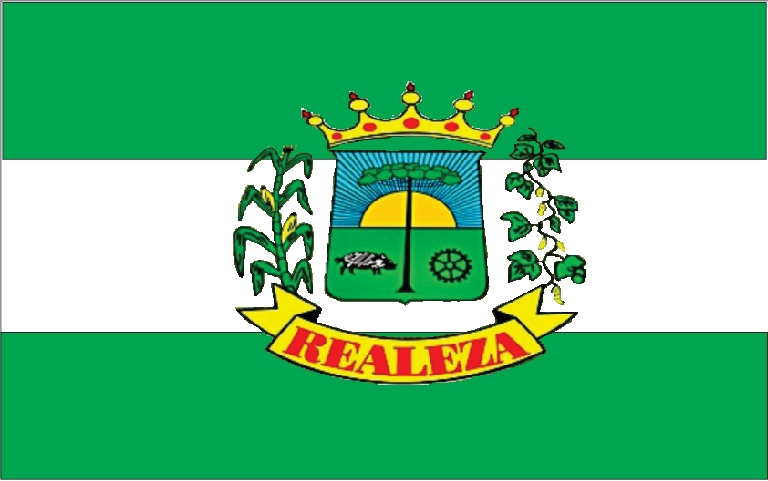
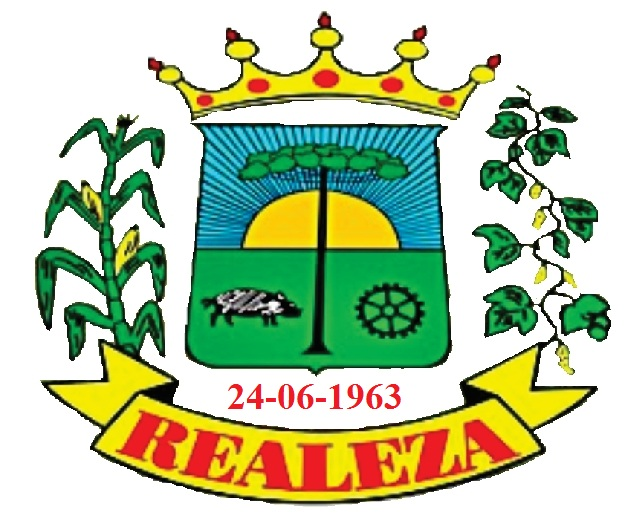
- Flag Coat of arms
- Interactive map of Realeza
- Country: Brazil
- Region: Southern
- State: Paraná
- Mesoregion: Sudoeste Paranaense

Population (2020)
  - Total: 16,950
- Time zone: UTC−3 (BRT)

Realeza is a municipality in the state of Paraná in the Southern Region of Brazil.

== See also ==
- List of municipalities in Paraná
