= Chapecó =

Municipality in Santa Catarina, Brazil

Coordinates: 27°05′45″S 52°37′04″W

- City
- City of Chapecó
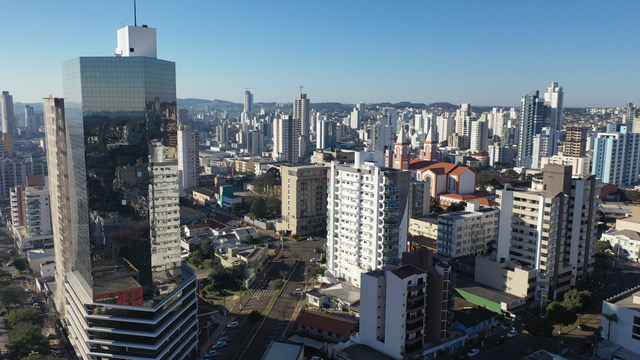
- Downtown Chapecó

- Flag Coat of arms
- Nicknames: Capital of the West, Chape, City of Chapecó
- Location of Chapecó
- Country: Brazil
- Region: South
- State: (Santa Catarina (state)) Santa Catarina
- Founded: August 25, 1917

Government
  - Mayor: João Rodrigues (PSD)

Area
  - City: 624.673 km^{2} (241.188 sq mi)
  - Urban: 66 km^{2} (25 sq mi)
  - Metro: 4,938.15 km^{2} (1,906.63 sq mi)
- Elevation: 674 m (2,211 ft)

Population (2025)
  - City: 282,648
  - Density: 407.76/km^{2} (1,056.1/sq mi)
  - Urban: 242,335
  - Metro: 545,283
  - Metro density: 110.17/km^{2} (285.3/sq mi)
- IBGE
- Demonym: Chapecoense
- Time zone: UTC-3 (UTC-3)
  - Summer (DST): UTC-2 (UTC-2)
- Postal code: 89800-000 to 89816-999
- HDI (2010): 0.790
- Website: www.chapeco.sc.gov.br

Chapecó (Portuguese pronunciation: [ʃapeˈkɔ]) is a municipality in the state of Santa Catarina, in the Southern Region of Brazil. Being a major industrial, financial and educational center, it is a major producer of industrialized food products. Considered a medium city, with a population estimated at 282,648 inhabitants, it is among the four most important cities in the state. It belongs to the Meso-region of Western Santa Catarina and to the Microregion of Chapecó.

Distant 550 km from the state capital, Florianópolis, it is Headquarters of the Metropolitan Region of Chapecó, and exerts significant influence not only in the Catarinense West but also in the Northwest Rio Grande do Sul and Southwest of Paraná, from an economic, cultural, or political point of view.

Chapecó became known worldwide through its association football club Chapecoense and the aftermath of LaMia Flight 2933 which killed 71, including most of the team's roster and staff.

With the titles of "Brazil's agribusiness capital" and "Brazil's business tourism capital", the planned town constructed in the form of a chess grid also has universities attracting students from all over Brazil. The main educational institutions are UFFS, UDESC, UNOCHAPECÓ, UNOESC and UCEFF.

== History ==
Until the 19th century, the area around Chapecó land was under indigenous (mainly Kaingang) and Spanish control, mostly unoccupied by European people and subject to border issues and armed conflicts. Brazilian control was in fact established as a military colony in 1882. Its official status as a municipality was established by state government decree after the Contestado War on August 25, 1917. Its area was then given to a private colonization company which began selling land to people coming mainly from the neighboring state of Rio Grande do Sul. Most of its inhabitants are descended from Italian, German and Polish immigrants.

== Demography ==
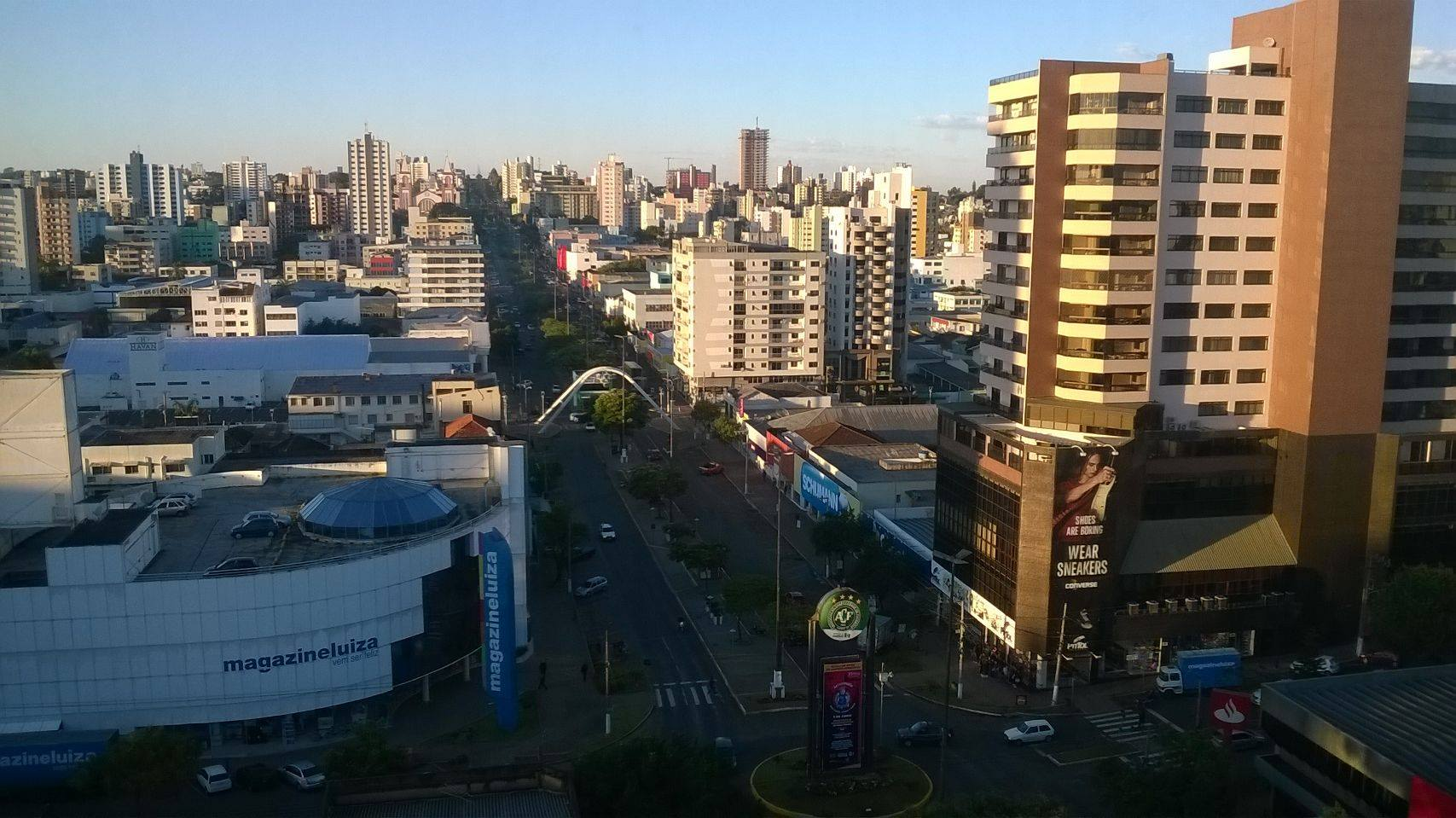
Buildings in the central part of the city in 2017

The region has always been the subject of disputes because of its strategic importance as a border region. During the Contestado War, airplanes were used for the first time in the history of America for the purpose of recognition and support for war operations. Colonized by Italian and German immigrants, mainly from Rio Grande do Sul, Paraná, São Paulo and the coast of Santa Catarina, the city today attracts several inhabitants thanks to its development.

It is one of the cities with the highest number (in percentage) of buildings in Santa Catarina. According to the IBGE, Chapecó has almost 16% of its population living in apartments, gaining in percentage of cities such as Joinville, Itajaí and Blumenau.

== Economy ==
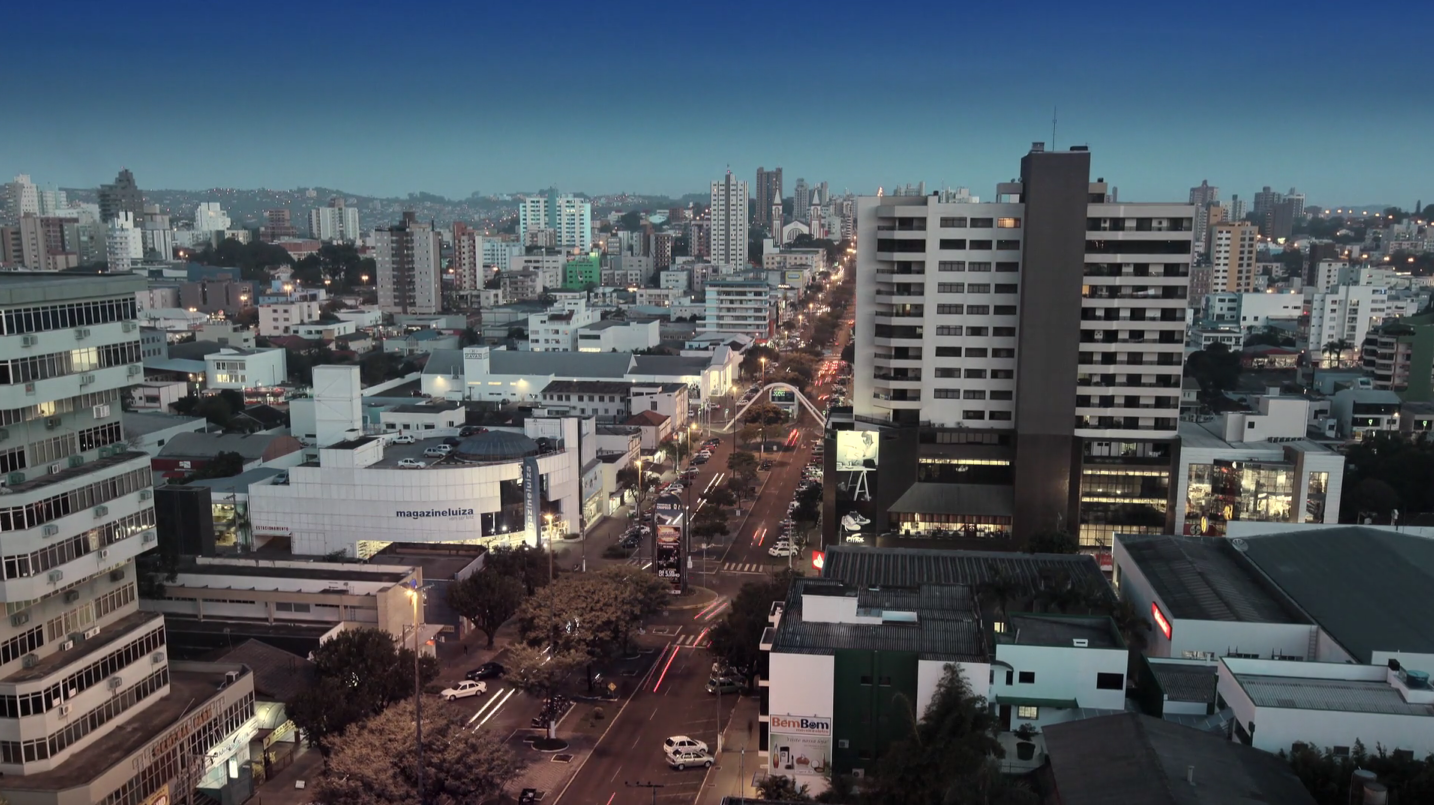

This region of the state is home of some of the largest meat processing and exporting industrial enterprises such as Sadia and Seara Foods; the farmers are organized in agricultural cooperatives. Chapecó is known as a Brazilian agro-industrial capital, specialized in pork, poultry and technology involved. The city is headquarters of Aurora Central Cooperative and has a plant of BRF S.A. since 1973.

Other major economic sectors are metal mechanics specialized in equipment for slaughterhouses and transportation, plastics and packaging, furniture, beverages, software development and biotechnology. Civil construction and trade are also important source of income.

Chapecó is served by Serafin Enoss Bertaso Airport.

== Culture ==
=== Sports ===
Football is the great passion of the Chapecoenses. The Chapecoense Football Association, known among its fans as a "Hurricane from the west", Chape and verdão, a team from Santa Catarina, has as its last title the Campeonato Catarinense de Futebol de 2020 - Série A. Its headquarters is in Arena Condá, with a capacity of over 22,000 people and located in the East Zone of the city. The team had spent three consecutive years in the C Series of the Brazilian Championship (2010, 2011 and 2012), before beginning a rapid rise through the Brazilian football pyramid by reaching the second division in 2013 and entering the Serie A Brasileirão in 2014, where it currently resides. The team was among the best teams in South America, reaching the quarterfinals of the 2015 Copa Sudamericana and reaching the final of the 2016 Copa Sudamericana.

On November 29, 2016, Chapecoense team members and staff boarded LaMia Flight 2933 to play the first leg of the 2016 Copa Sudamericana Finals against Atlético Nacional in Medellín, Colombia. The plane crashed in the mountains a few miles south of the city. Seventy-one of the seventy-seven people on board died, including all of the club's coaching staff and all but three of the players. A wave of commotion abated in the football world in the days and weeks after, playing tribute to the club; Atlético Nacional requested that CONMEBOL, the governing football association for South America, award the 2016 title to Chapecoense, which was granted.

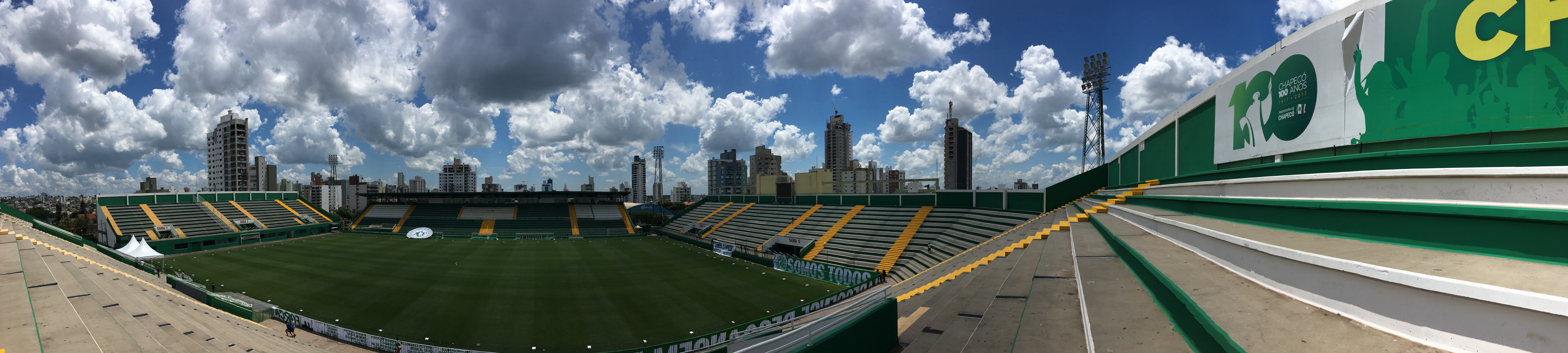
Arena condá, stadium of Chapecoense.

== Education ==
Founded in 2009, the headquarters and main campus of the Federal University of Fronteira Sul (Portuguese: Universidade Federal da Fronteira Sul, UFFS) are in Chapecó, while its smaller campuses are located in Laranjeiras do Sul and Realeza in Paraná, and Cerro Largo, Erechim, and Passo Fundo in Rio Grande do Sul. One of the campuses of Universidade do Oeste de Santa Catarina (Unoesc) as well as campuses of other educational institutions such as UCEFF, UNOCHAPECÓ, and UDESC are also located in Chapecó.

== Other ==
The city is the seat of the Roman Catholic Diocese of Chapecó.

== Climate ==
Climate data for Chapecó (1991–2020, extremes 1976–2005)
Month	Jan	Feb	Mar	Apr	May	Jun	Jul	Aug	Sep	Oct	Nov	Dec	Year
Record high °C (°F)	35.5 (95.9)	35.4 (95.7)	34.4 (93.9)	32.0 (89.6)	30.8 (87.4)	28.0 (82.4)	28.9 (84.0)	33.0 (91.4)	33.5 (92.3)	34.1 (93.4)	37.2 (99.0)	37.0 (98.6)	37.2 (99.0)
Mean daily maximum °C (°F)	29.3 (84.7)	28.8 (83.8)	28.0 (82.4)	25.4 (77.7)	21.5 (70.7)	20.0 (68.0)	20.1 (68.2)	22.7 (72.9)	23.2 (73.8)	25.6 (78.1)	27.5 (81.5)	28.9 (84.0)	25.1 (77.2)
Daily mean °C (°F)	23.6 (74.5)	23.1 (73.6)	22.0 (71.6)	19.5 (67.1)	15.8 (60.4)	14.7 (58.5)	14.4 (57.9)	16.6 (61.9)	17.4 (63.3)	19.8 (67.6)	21.5 (70.7)	23.1 (73.6)	19.3 (66.7)
Mean daily minimum °C (°F)	19.0 (66.2)	18.9 (66.0)	17.7 (63.9)	15.4 (59.7)	12.1 (53.8)	11.1 (52.0)	10.5 (50.9)	12.2 (54.0)	12.9 (55.2)	15.3 (59.5)	16.4 (61.5)	18.3 (64.9)	15.0 (59.0)
Record low °C (°F)	9.8 (49.6)	8.8 (47.8)	6.2 (43.2)	2.0 (35.6)	−0.6 (30.9)	−2.8 (27.0)	−4.5 (23.9)	−4.0 (24.8)	3.0 (37.4)	3.2 (37.8)	6.0 (42.8)	9.0 (48.2)	−4.5 (23.9)
Average precipitation mm (inches)	187.0 (7.36)	205.5 (8.09)	151.5 (5.96)	170.3 (6.70)	157.0 (6.18)	182.3 (7.18)	173.8 (6.84)	130.5 (5.14)	199.6 (7.86)	254.0 (10.00)	163.3 (6.43)	188.2 (7.41)	2,163 (85.16)
Average relative humidity (%)	72.7	75.4	74.6	75.9	78.4	78.8	74.6	68.2	70.7	72.7	68.2	70.0	73.4
Mean monthly sunshine hours	226.6	195.1	213.3	194.1	176.1	149.9	173.6	191.4	172.3	187.1	225.9	220.1	2,325.5
Source 1: Instituto Nacional de Meteorologia
Source 2: Empresa Brasileira de Pesquisa Agropecuária (EMBRAPA)

== Twin towns – sister cities ==
Chapecó is twinned with:

- Asunción, Paraguay
- La Unión, Colombia
- Medellín, Colombia
- Ninghai, China
- Pergamino, Argentina

== See also ==
- Federal University of Fronteira Sul
