= 2024 Associação Chapecoense de Futebol season =

Associação Chapecoense de Futebol
- Manager: Claudinei Oliveira (until 11 February); Umberto Louzer (from 16 February)
- Stadium: Arena Condá
- Série B: 16th
- Campeonato Catarinense: Regular season
- Top goalscorer: League: Bruno Leonardo; Mário Sérgio (3 each); All: Bruno Leonardo; Marcinho; Mário Sérgio (3 each)
Home colours	Away colours

During the 2024 season, Chapecoense will participate in the Série B and Campeonato Catarinense. The team did not qualify for the Copa do Brasil.

== Competitions ==
=== Overall record ===
Competition	First match	Last match	Starting round	Final position	Record							
Competition	First match	Last match	Starting round	Final position	Pld	W	D	L	GF	GA	GD	Win %
Série B	20 April 2024	26 November 2024	Matchday 1		37	11	11	15	34	44	−10	29.73
Campeonato Catarinense	20 January 2024	2 March 2024	Regular Season	Regular Season	11	3	2	6	13	16	−3	27.27
Total					48	14	13	21	47	60	−13	29.17

Last updated: 23 June 2024
Source: Soccerway

=== Campeonato Brasileiro Série B ===
==== League table ====
Pos	Team	Pld	W	D	L	GF	GA	GD	Pts	Promotion or relegation
13	Paysandu	38	12	14	12	41	43	−2	50	
14	Botafogo-SP	38	11	12	15	36	51	−15	45	
15	Chapecoense	38	11	11	16	34	45	−11	44	
16	CRB	38	11	10	17	38	45	−7	43	
17	Ponte Preta (R)	38	10	8	20	37	55	−18	38	Relegation to 2025 Campeonato Brasileiro Série C

Source: CBF
Rules for classification: 1) points; 2) wins; 3) goal difference; 4) goals scored; 5) head-to-head results (only between 2 teams); 6) fewest red cards; 7) fewest yellow cards; 8) drawing of lots.
(R) Relegated

==== Results summary ====
Overall								Home						Away					
Pld	W	D	L	GF	GA	GD	Pts	W	D	L	GF	GA	GD	W	D	L	GF	GA	GD
12	3	5	4	10	11	−1	14	1	3	2	7	7	0	2	2	2	3	4	−1

Last updated: 23 June 2024.

==== Results by round ====
Round	1	2	3	4	5	6
Ground	H	A	H	A	A	H
Result	W	W	D	L	D	D
Position	1	3	4	6	8	10

Updated to match(es) played on 23 June 2024. Source:
A = Away; H = Home; W = Win; D = Draw; L = Loss

==== Matches ====
13 June 2024 10	Amazonas	0–1	Chapecoense	Manaus
20:00 UTC−4				Stadium: Estádio Municipal Carlos Zamith

17 June 2024 11	Chapecoense	0–1	Operário Ferroviário	Chapecó
21:00 UTC−3				Stadium: Arena Condá

23 June 2024 12	Chapecoense	1–2	Paysandu	Chapecó
16:00 UTC−3				Stadium: Arena Condá

1 July 2024 13	Santos	v	Chapecoense	Santos
19:00 UTC−3				Stadium: Estádio Urbano Caldeira; Referee: Jefferson Ferreira de Moraes

=== Campeonato Catarinense ===
==== Results summary ====
Overall								Home						Away					
Pld	W	D	L	GF	GA	GD	Pts	W	D	L	GF	GA	GD	W	D	L	GF	GA	GD
11	3	2	6	13	16	−3	11	2	1	3	7	8	−1	1	1	3	6	8	−2

Last updated: 23 June 2024.

==== Results by round ====
Round	1	2	3	4	5	6	7	8	9	10	11
Ground	H	A	A	H	H	A	H	H	A	H	A
Result	W	D	L	D	L	L	L	W	W	L	L
Position	5	4	8	7	9	11	11	11	8	9	9

A = Away; H = Home; W = Win; D = Draw; L = Loss

==== Matches ====
20 January 2024 1	Chapecoense	1–0	Hercílio Luz	Chapeco
				Stadium: Arena Condá

24 January 2024 2	Brusque	0–0	Chapecoense

28 January 2024 3	Avaí	3–2	Chapecoense

31 January 2024 4	Chapecoense	2–2	Barra	Chapeco
				Stadium: Arena Condá

4 February 2024 5	Chapecoense	0–1	Concórdia	Chapeco
				Stadium: Arena Condá

7 February 2024 6	Marcílio Dias	2–1	Chapecoense

10 February 2024 7	Chapecoense	2–3	Joinville	Chapeco
				Stadium: Arena Condá

14 February 2024 8	Chapecoense	2–1	Internacional de Lages	Chapeco
				Stadium: Arena Condá

19 February 2024 9	Nação	1–3	Chapecoense

24 February 2024 10	Chapecoense	0–1	Figueirense	Chapeco
				Stadium: Arena Condá

2 March 2024 11	Criciúma	2–0	Chapecoense	Criciúma
