= Associação Chapecoense de Futebol =

Brazilian football club based in Chapecó

Chapecoense
- Full name: Associação Chapecoense de Futebol
- Nicknames: Verdão (Big Green); Furacão do Oeste (Western Hurricane); Chape (Chape); Chape terror (Chape Terror); Eternos Campeões (Eternal Champions)
- Founded: 10 May 1973; 53 years ago
- Ground: Arena Condá
- Capacity: 20,089
- President: Alex Passos
- Head coach: Vinícius Bergantin
- League: Campeonato Brasileiro Série A Campeonato Catarinense
- 2025 2025: Série B, 3rd of 20 (promoted); Catarinense, 2nd of 12
- Website: chapecoense.com
Home colours	Away colours	Third colours

Associação Chapecoense de Futebol, commonly known as Chapecoense, is a Brazilian football club, based in the city of Chapecó in the state of Santa Catarina.

The club was founded in 1973 with the goal of restoring football in the city, and won the state championship, the Campeonato Catarinense, for the first time in 1977. The club has won seven state titles to date, most recently in 2020. A relatively small club, it entered Brazil's top division, Série A, for the first time in 1978, returning to the top flight only in 2014. The club also has activities in futsal, in which it has been state champion twice. The club's home matches are played at Arena Condá.

On 28 November 2016, a charter flight carrying the first team crashed as it approached José María Córdova International Airport near Medellín, Colombia, where the team was travelling to play the first leg of the 2016 Copa Sudamericana final against Atlético Nacional, a match that was seen as the biggest in the history of the club. All but six of the 77 passengers died; only three Chapecoense players survived their injuries. On Atlético Nacional’s request Chapecoense were awarded the trophy.

== History ==
The club was founded as Associação Chapecoense de Futebol on 10 May 1973, after the merger of Atlético Chapecoense and Independente.

In 1977, Chapecoense won its first title, which was the Campeonato Catarinense, beating Avaí 1–0 in the final.

In 1978, the club competed for the first time in the Campeonato Brasileiro, finishing in the 51st position, and in following year, finished in the 93rd position.

In 2002, due to a partnership, Chapecoense was renamed to Associação Chapecoense Kindermann/Mastervet. In 2006, the club went back to its original name, Associação Chapecoense de Futebol, and also won the Copa Santa Catarina. In 2007, the club won the state championship for the third time, and also competed in the Brazilian Championship Third Level, but was eliminated in the first stage of the competition. They won the Campeonato Catarinense again in 2011 and 2016.

Chapecoense competed in the Série A for the first time since 1979 in 2014, as the club was promoted after they and Bragantino drew 1–1, in Chapecó, for the 2013 Série B. Winning important points during its first season in the top flight, Chape cemented a place in the 2015 Série A, its second season in a row in the first division.

In 2016, Chapecoense made history when they reached the finals of the Copa Sudamericana, South America's secondary club football tournament, after defeating San Lorenzo de Almagro using the away goals rule. They were awarded the title following LaMia Flight 2933, a disastrous plane crash which killed the majority of their squad on the way to the final.

=== 2016 plane crash ===
On the evening of 28 November 2016, LaMia Flight 2933, carrying 77 people, including the staff and players from the club, crashed as it approached Medellín, Colombia; 71 people died (including 21 journalists and almost the entire first team and managerial staff) and 6 survived, according to the BBC. The surviving players were left-back Alan Ruschel, backup goalkeeper Jakson Follmann (who had one of his legs amputated due to his injuries and was forced to retire from professional football), and center-back Neto. Goalkeeper Danilo initially survived the crash, but later died before arriving to the hospital. Chapecoense goalkeeper Nivaldo, who did not board the flight, soon after announced his immediate retirement from football. It emerged that the crash had resulted from fuel starvation; the pilot had requested to land due to fuel problems, but was instructed to wait, as another aircraft was having fuel leakage problems and had already requested priority landing. The government of Bolivia suspended LaMia Airlines's flying license after it surfaced that the pilot skipped a crucial refueling stop.

Due to the crash, the 2016 Copa Sudamericana Finals in which the team were due to play was suspended indefinitely. Their opponents, Atlético Nacional, offered to concede the tie to allow Chapecoense to be awarded the championship. On 4 December 2016, Chapecoense's interim president announced that CONMEBOL would be granting the club the tournament title and prize money. While initially other Brazilian clubs offered to loan out players to them for free and sent a request to the Brazilian FA stating that the club should be immune from relegation for three years, Chapecoense rejected this assistance, stating that they wanted to rebuild properly.

Chapecoense were asked to fulfill their next league fixture in tribute to the players and staff who died in a plane crash. Chapecoense President Ivan Tozzo revealed that the Brazilian FA had asked for the club to play their final league game of the 2016 campaign in part by drawing on their Under-20s side to fill out the roster. However, both Chapecoense and their opponents Atlético Mineiro refused to play. Both teams were awarded a 3–0 loss for the game.

==== Deceased Chapecoense players ====
- Ailton Cesar Junior Alves da Silva (Canela), 22
- Dener Assunção Braz (Dener), 25
- Marcelo Augusto Mathias da Silva (Marcelo), 25
- Matheus Bitencourt da Silva (Matheus Biteco), 21
- Mateus Lucena dos Santos (Caramelo), 22
- Guilherme Gimenez de Souza (Gimenez), 21
- Lucas Gomes da Silva (Lucas Gomes), 26
- Everton Kempes dos Santos Gonçalves (Kempes), 34
- Arthur Brasiliano Maia (Arthur Maia), 24
- Ananias Eloi Castro Monteiro (Ananias), 27
- Marcos Danilo Padilha (Danilo), 31
- Filipe José Machado (Filipe Machado), 32
- Sérgio Manoel Barbosa Santos (Sérgio Manoel), 27
- José Gildeixon Clemente de Paiva (Gil), 29
- Bruno Rangel Domingues (Bruno Rangel), 34
- Cléber Santana Loureiro (Cléber Santana), 35
- Josimar Rosado da Silva Tavares (Josimar), 30
- Willian Thiego de Jesus (Thiego), 30
- Tiago da Rocha Vieira Alves (Tiaguinho), 22

==== Deceased Chapecoense staff ====
- Luiz Carlos Saroli (Caio Júnior), coach, 51
- Gilberto Pace Thomaz (Giba), press officer, 29

=== Later years ===
As Copa Sudamericana champions, Chapecoense qualified for the 2017 Copa Libertadores, their first appearance in that tournament. With a squad built up from loan players, free signings and promoted youth players, as well as two survivors of the crash, they won their first match in an away game at Zulia of Venezuela.

On 27 November 2019, almost three years to the day from the devastating plane crash, the club suffered relegation from the Série A following a 0–1 loss to Botafogo.

On 12 January 2021, a year after being relegated, they were promoted back to the Série A following a 2–1 victory against state rivals Figueirense.

== Current squad ==
As of 12 November 2026

Note: Flags indicate national team as defined under FIFA eligibility rules; some limited exceptions apply. Players may hold more than one non-FIFA nationality.

No.	Pos.	Nation	Player
3	DF	BRA	Eduardo Doma (captain)
4	DF	BRA	João Paulo
5	DF	BRA	Heitor
6	DF	BRA	Mancha
7	FW	BRA	Marcinho
8	MF	BRA	Robert Santos (on loan from Atlético Mineiro)
9	FW	BRA	Túlio Eduardo
10	MF	BRA	Giovanni Augusto
12	DF	BRA	Fernando
14	GK	BRA	Gabriel Werner
15	DF	BRA	Rafael Thyere
16	MF	BRA	Bruno Matias
17	MF	BRA	Vinicius Balieiro
19	MF	BRA	David Antunes
20	DF	BRA	Bruno Tubarão
21	DF	BRA	Kauan Faria
22	MF	BRA	Max Alves (on loan from Cuiabá)

No.	Pos.	Nation	Player
25	DF	BRA	Victor Caetano
26	DF	BRA	Everton
27	MF	BRA	Camilo (on loan from Grêmio)
29	FW	URU	Franco Rossi (on loan from Toluca)
30	GK	BRA	Matheus Aurélio (on loan from Tombense)
31	FW	BRA	Maurício Garcez
34	GK	BRA	Kainã
35	DF	BRA	Vinicius Eduardo
55	MF	BRA	Rosivan
70	FW	BRA	Rubens Ricoldi
77	FW	COL	Dylan Borrero
80	MF	ESP	Miguel Carvalho
88	MF	BRA	Yago Felipe
91	DF	BRA	Bruno Pacheco
94	FW	URU	Kevin Ramírez (on loan from Atlético Goianiense)
98	GK	BRA	Anderson
99	MF	BRA	Rafael Carvalheira

=== Youth team ===
Note: Flags indicate national team as defined under FIFA eligibility rules; some limited exceptions apply. Players may hold more than one non-FIFA nationality.

No.	Pos.	Nation	Player
32	GK	BRA	Wellington
39	FW	BRA	Rodrigo Endrio
50	FW	BRA	Kássio

No.	Pos.	Nation	Player
51	FW	BRA	Gleidson
66	DF	BRA	Juan Ferreira

=== Other players under contract ===
Note: Flags indicate national team as defined under FIFA eligibility rules; some limited exceptions apply. Players may hold more than one non-FIFA nationality.

No.	Pos.	Nation	Player
—	DF	BRA	Gustavo Talles
—	MF	BRA	Da Silva

=== Out on loan ===
Note: Flags indicate national team as defined under FIFA eligibility rules; some limited exceptions apply. Players may hold more than one non-FIFA nationality.

No.	Pos.	Nation	Player
—	DF	BRA	Cadu (at Banga Gargždai until 30 November 2026)
—	FW	BRA	Mailson (at Figueirense until 30 November 2026)
—	FW	BRA	Ítalo (at Jeonbuk Hyundai Motors until 30 June 2027)

No.	Pos.	Nation	Player
—	FW	COL	Jonathan Palacios (at Cascavel until 30 November 2026)
—	FW	BRA	Pedro Perotti (at Sport Recife until 30 November 2026)

== Sponsors ==
As of 2016, the sponsors are English company Umbro, the kit supplier; Caixa Econômica Federal, a state-owned Brazilian bank; Unimed, a Brazilian health insurance company; and Aurora Alimentos, a food processing company from Chapecó.

== Honours ==
=== Official tournaments ===
Continental
Competitions	Titles	Seasons
Copa Sudamericana	1	2016
National
Competitions	Titles	Seasons
Campeonato Brasileiro Série B	1	2020
State
Competitions	Titles	Seasons
Campeonato Catarinense	7	1977, 1996, 2007, 2011, 2016, 2017, 2020
Copa Santa Catarina	1	2006

=== Others tournaments ===
==== National and Inter-state ====
- Copa da Paz Internacional (1): 2005
- Torneio da Cidade de São Gabriel (1): 2005
- Troféu João Saldanha (1): 2017

==== State ====
- Taça Santa Catarina (2): 1979, 2014

=== Runners-up ===
- Recopa Sudamericana (1): 2017
- Suruga Bank Championship (1): 2017
- Campeonato Brasileiro Série B (1): 2013
- Copa Sul-Sudeste (1): 2026
- Campeonato Catarinense (10): 1978, 1991, 1995, 2009, 2013, 2018, 2019, 2021, 2025, 2026
- Copa Santa Catarina (1): 1996
- Recopa Catarinense (1): 2021

== Season records ==
As of 2025 season

Season	Div.	Pos.	Pl.	W	D	L	GS	GA	Pts.	Copa do Brasil	CONMEBOL	
1978	Série A	51	18	5	5	8	13	22	15	–	DNP	
1979	Série A	93	9	0	3	6	6	16	3	–	DNP	
1980	Série B	64	7	0	1	6	2	13	1	–	DNP	
1987	Série C	9	8	2	5	1	8	7	9	–	DNP	
1992	Série C	13	6	3	1	2	9	8	7	DNP	DNP	
1995	Série C	27	8	3	3	2	9	8	12	DNP	DNP	
1996	Série C	39	6	3	0	3	6	9	9	DNP	DNP	
1997	Série C	40	6	2	1	3	3	4	7	DNP	DNP	
1998	Série C	58	10	1	3	6	11	26	6	DNP	DNP	
2007	Série C	54	6	1	1	4	5	10	4	DNP	DNP	
2008	DNP									Second round	DNP	
2009	Série D	3	14	8	3	3	24	13	27	DNP	DNP	
2010	Série C	7	10	3	4	3	10	10	16	Second round	DNP	
2011	Série C	6	14	6	3	5	25	19	21	DNP	DNP	
2012	Série C	3	22	9	6	7	27	14	33	Second round	DNP	
2013	Série B	2	38	20	12	6	60	31	72	DNP	DNP	
2014	Série A	15	38	11	10	17	39	44	43	Second round	DNP	
2015	Série A	14	38	12	11	15	34	44	47	Second round	CS	Quarterfinals
2016	Série A	11	38	13	13	12	49	53	52	Round of 32	CS	Champions (Note: Final tournament cancelled due to LaMia Flight 2933 plane crash before the start of the first leg)
2017	Série A	8	38	15	9	14	47	49	54	Round of 16	CL	Group stage
2017	Série A	8	38	15	9	14	47	49	54	Round of 16	CS	Round of 16
2018	Série A	14	38	11	11	16	34	50	44	Quarterfinals	CL	Second stage
2019	Série A	19	38	7	11	20	31	52	32	Fourth round	CS	First stage
2020	Série B	1	38	20	13	5	42	21	73	Second round	DNP	
2021	Série A	20	38	1	12	25	27	67	15	Third round	DNP	
2022	Série B	14	38	11	12	15	37	39	45	First round	DNP	
2023	Série B	16	38	9	13	16	38	43	40	First round	DNP	
2024	Série B	15	38	11	11	16	34	45	44	DNP	DNP	
2025	Série B	3	38	18	8	12	52	35	62	DNP	DNP	
