= China University of Geosciences (Beijing) =

Public university in Beijing, China

- 中国地质大学（北京）
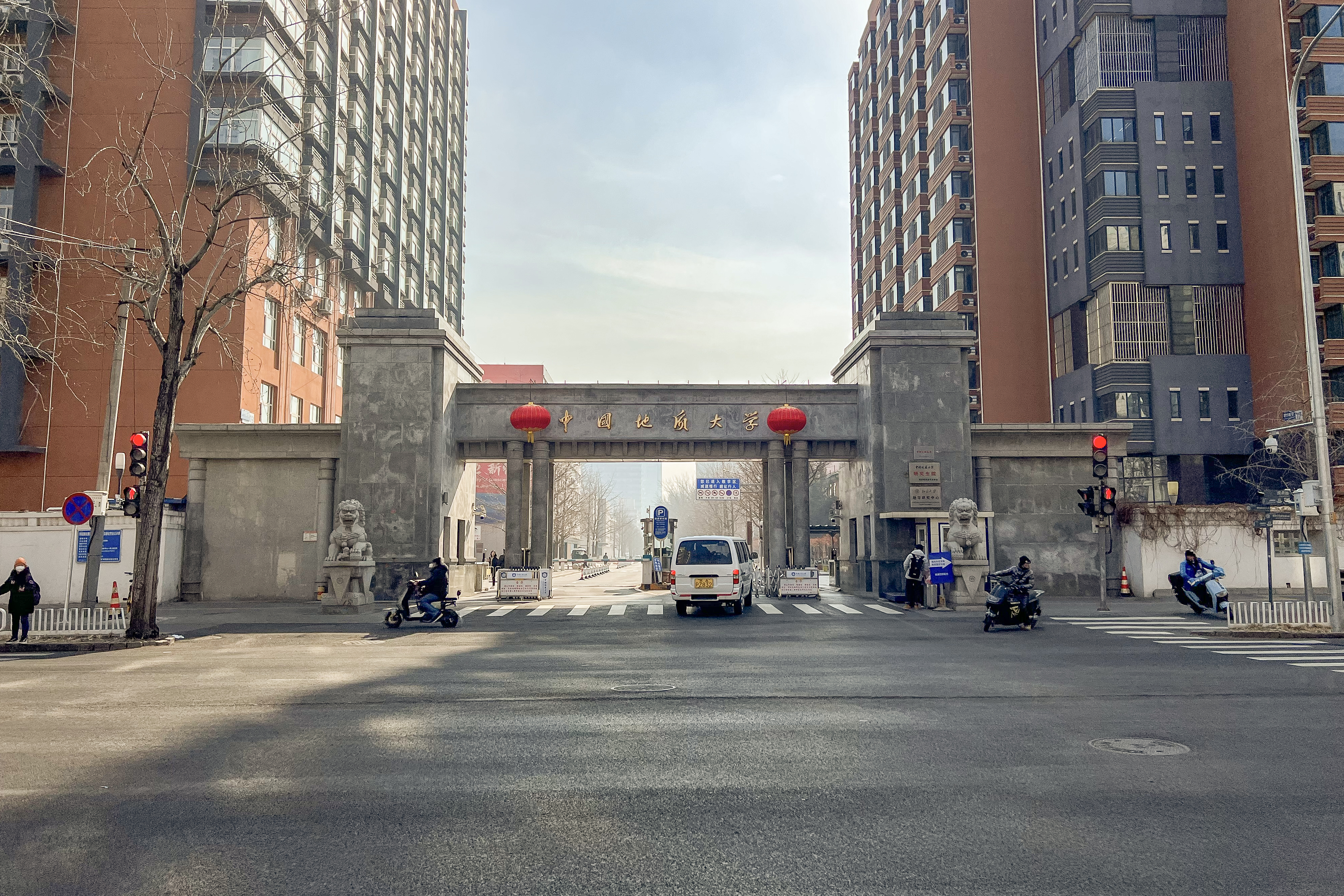
- Northern gate
- Former names: Beijing Institute of Geology, Beijing Graduate School of Wuhan College of Geology
- Motto: 艰苦朴素 求真务实
- Motto in English: Work hard, keep modest, and pursue truth and pragmatism
- Type: National Public
- Established: November 1952; 74 years ago
- Chairman: Lei Yaling
- President: Sun Youhong
- Location: Beijing, China; 39°58′48″N 116°20′27″E
- Campus: 130 acres (53 ha); Urban
- Website: cugb.edu.cn

Chinese name
- Simplified Chinese: 中国地质大学(北京)
- Traditional Chinese: 中國地質大學(北京)
Transcriptions
Standard Mandarin
- Hanyu Pinyin: Zhōngguó Dìzhì Dàxué (Běijīng)

The China University of Geosciences (Beijing) is a public university located in Beijing, China. It is affiliated with the Ministry of Education, and co-funded by the Ministry of Education and the Ministry of Natural Resources. The university is part of the Double First-Class Construction and Project 211.

In administrative and legal terms, the China University of Geosciences (Beijing) and the China University of Geosciences (Wuhan) are considered separate entities. CUG Beijing and CUG Wuhan have different constitutions, presidents, and governing boards, as well as separate legal entity registration, admission procedures, financial systems, Internet domains, and logos.

== Academics ==
As of 2023, CUGB consists of 16 schools, offering 56 undergraduate programs, 34 master's programs (18 research-based and 15 course-based), 16 doctoral programs, and 14 professional degree programs. As of 2021, the university has approximately 17,000 full-time students, including 8,000 undergraduates, 6,500 master's students, and 2,000 doctoral students (including international students). CUGB has about 1,700 faculty and staff members, including approximately 300 professors, 400 associate professors, and 800 lecturers (or assistant professors). Among the faculty, there are 11 academicians of the Chinese Academy of Sciences and 1 academician of the Chinese Academy of Engineering. The university boasts notable alumni such as Wen Jiabao (former Premier of China) and 44 Chinese academicians. CUGB has established long-term cooperation agreements with overseas institutions including Colorado School of Mines, University of California Los Angeles, University of Waterloo, University of Edinburgh, University of Birmingham, Moscow State University, University of Southern Queensland, University of Freiburg, University of Hanover, Helmholtz Potsdam Center, University of Sydney, and the University of Namibia.

=== Schools and Departments ===
CUGB has the following schools and departments:

- School of Earth Sciences and Resources
- School of Engineering and Technology
- School of Materials Science and Technology
- School of Artificial Intelligence
- School of Water Resources and Environment
- School of Energy Resources
- School of Economics and Management
- School of Foreign Languages
- School of Gemology
- School of Geophysics and Information Technology
- School of Ocean Sciences
- School of Land Science and Technology
- School of Marxism
- School of Science
- School of Physical Education
- School of Continuing Education

=== Ranking ===
University rankings

Global – Overall
- ARWU World: 301-400
- CWUR World: 662
- THE World: 1000–1200

Regional – Overall
- THE Asia: 301-350

CUGB is a research-oriented university primarily focused on the fields of geology, natural resources, and environmental studies. Its programs cover various disciplines such as science, engineering, humanities, management, economics, and law. Among them, geology and geological engineering have been listed as "Double First-Class Construction" disciplines in China, and these two disciplines received A+ ratings in the fourth round of discipline assessment conducted by the Chinese Ministry of Education.

Six of the university's disciplines, including geology, engineering science, environment and ecology, materials science, chemistry, and computer science are ranked within the top 1% in the Essential Science Indicators (ESI), with geology specifically ranking in the top 1‰.

=== Key disciplines ===
==== National key disciplines ====
The university has 2 primary disciplines and 8 secondary disciplines recognized as national key disciplines:

- Geology
  - Geochemistry
  - Paleobiology and stratigraphy
  - Mineralogy, petrology and ore deposit
  - Structural geology and tectonics
  - Quaternary geology
- Geological Resources and Engineering
  - Mineral exploration and prospecting
  - Geological engineering
  - Earth exploration and information technology

==== Ministry-level key disciplines ====
The university has 14 research directions that have been designated as key disciplines either by the Beijing Municipality or by China's ministry-level departments. They include:

- Geophysics
- Environmental science and engineering
- Safety science and engineering
- Management science
- Demography, resource and environmental economics
- Computer science
- Ideological and political education
- Materials science
- Geotechnical engineering
- Marine geology
- Land resources management
- Oil and gas field development engineering
- Hydrology and water resources
- Offshore resources and environment

=== Laboratories and research platforms ===
==== National level ====
The CUGB is home to 1 State Key Laboratory of China and 1 national platform:

- State Key Laboratory of Geological Processes and Mineral Resources
- National platform of rock, mineral and fossil specimen resource collaboration

==== Ministry level ====
The university is home to 15 key laboratories or research centers at ministry or province (Beijing municipality) level:

- Laboratory of Groundwater Cycle and Environmental Evolution (Key Laboratory listed by the Ministry of Education)
- Laboratory of Marine Reservoir Evolution and Oil and Gas Enrichment Mechanism (Key Laboratory listed by the Ministry of Education)
- Laboratory of Underground Information Detection Technology and Instruments (Key Laboratory listed by the Ministry of Education)
- Laboratory of Deep Geological Drilling Technology (Key Laboratory listed by the Ministry of Natural Resources)
- Laboratory of Strategic Evaluation of Shale Gas Resources (Key Laboratory listed by the Ministry of Natural Resources)
- Laboratory of Resource and Environmental Carrying Capacity Evaluation (Key Laboratory listed by the Ministry of Natural Resources)
- Laboratory of Land Reclamation (Key Laboratory listed by the Ministry of Natural Resources)
- Laboratory for Geological Evaluation and Development of Unconventional Natural Gas Energy (Key Laboratory of Beijing Municipality)
- Laboratory of Water Resources and Environmental Engineering (Key Laboratory of Beijing Municipality)
- Laboratory of Land Resources Information Research and Development (Key Laboratory of Beijing Municipality)
- Laboratory of Non-metallic Minerals and Solid Waste Resources (Key Laboratory of Beijing Municipality)
- Cooperation Base for Deep Drilling Equipment and Machinery (Key Platform listed by the Ministry of Science and Technology)
- Metal Mineral Exploration and Evaluation Research Center (Key Research Center listed by the Ministry of Education)
- Research Center for Ecological Restoration of Mining Areas (Innovation Center listed by the Ministry of Natural Resources)
- Research Center for Natural Resources Big Data (Innovation Center listed by the Ministry of Natural Resources)

==== Other notable research centers ====
- Research Center for Geological Heritage
- Research Center for Geological Microbiology and Biogeochemistry
- Research Center for Environmental Science and Engineering

=== Academic journals ===
CUGB organizes several peer-reviewed journals, including the English journal Geoscience Frontiers (open access journal published by Elsevier) and Chinese journals of GEOSCIENCE (现代地质), Resources & Industries (资源与产业), and Chinese Geological Education (中国地质教育).

=== Degree programs ===
==== Undergraduate major programs ====
Geology (honors program), geology, digital earth and big data, geochemistry, geology and geophysics dual program, tourism geology, solid mineral resources exploration, civil engineering, geological engineering (honors program), geological engineering, urban underground space engineering, safety engineering, mechanical engineering and automation, new energy materials, materials chemistry, materials physics, materials engineering, artificial intelligence, geographic information systems, data science, information engineering, electrical engineering, computer science, software engineering, groundwater science, hydrology and water resources, environmental engineering, ecological engineering, new energy science, petroleum engineering, carbon storage, new energy geology, energy engineering, accounting, information management and systems, business administration, law, economics, foreign language translation, English studies, product design, gemology, arts and technology, exploration engineering, geophysics, intelligent earth exploration, measurement and control technology, marine science, marine resources, land reclamation engineering, land management, surveying, natural resources management, remote sensing, mathematics, and applied mathematics.

==== Research-based master's programs ====
1. Mineralogy, Petrology and Ore Deposits
2. Geochemistry
3. Paleobiology and Stratigraphy
4. Tectonics
5. Quaternary Geology
6. Geological Engineering
7. Law
8. Education
9. Psychology
10. Kinesiology
11. Foreign Languages and Literature
12. Journalism and Communication
13. Mathematics
14. Physics
15. Chemistry
16. Geography
17. Atmospheric Sciences
18. Biology
19. Mechanical Engineering
20. Information and Communication Engineering
21. Computer Science and Technology
22. Software Engineering
23. Business Administration
24. Arts

==== Course-based master's programs ====
1. Electronic Information (options: electronics and communication engineering, control engineering, computer science, and software engineering)
2. Mechanical Engineering
3. Materials and Chemical Engineering (options: material sciences, and chemical engineering)
4. Resources and Environment (options: geological engineering, environmental engineering, safety engineering, surveying, and petroleum engineering)
5. Civil Engineering and Water Resources (options: architecture, civil engineering, and hydraulic engineering)
6. Property Evaluation
7. Law
8. Science History
9. Physical Education
10. Foreign Language Translation
11. Business Administration
12. Public Administration
13. Accounting
14. Design
15. Applied Statistics
16. Finance
17. Geographic Information Systems

==== Doctoral programs ====
1. Applied Economics
2. Marxist Theory
3. Marine Science
4. Geophysics
5. Geology
6. Materials Science and Engineering
7. Control Engineering
8. Civil Engineering
9. Water Resources Engineering
10. Surveying and Mapping
11. Geological Resources and Geological Engineering
12. Petroleum and Natural Gas Engineering
13. Environmental Science and Engineering
14. Safety Engineering
15. Management Science and Engineering
16. Public Administration

== Campus ==
The campus of CUGB is located on the Xueyuan Road (literally: college road), a hub for higher education institutions in Haidian District of Beijing, housing a total of eight universities. The campus covers an area of approximately 130 acres, with the main road being a 2-kilometer-long tree-lined boulevard. On the north side of the boulevard, there are instructional and office buildings, the library, and the residential halls. On the south side of this boulevard, there is a cluster of sports facilities, including two standard-sized football fields, a rock climbing wall, nine basketball courts, and several badminton and tennis courts. Near the eastern gate of the university, there is the Geology Museum of CUGB. Additionally, there is an international conference center within the campus.

The campus of CUGB is near several other notable universities. To the north are Beijing Language and Culture University, Beijing Forestry University, and China University of Mining and Technology; to the south is Beijing University of Aeronautics and Astronautics; to the east is University of Science and Technology Beijing; and to the west are Tsinghua University and Peking University.

A new CUGB campus of about 263 acres is under construction in Xiong'an and is expected to complete in late 2025.

The university operates field camp stations in Zhoukoudian, Beidaihe, and Pingquan.

== History ==
=== 1952–1970: Beijing Institute of Geology ===
During the 1952 reorganisation of Chinese higher education, Beijing Institute of Geology was founded as a result of the merger of several geology-related departments from Peking University, Tsinghua University, Tianjin University, and Tangshan Railway College. It was among China's first 16 key universities back in the 1950s.

=== 1970–1978: Relocating to Wuhan ===
The university suspended operations from 1966 to 1970 due to the Cultural Revolution, and reopened in Jiangling County, Hubei Province, in 1970 as Hubei College of Geology. In 1975, the campus was moved to Wuhan, and the school was renamed Wuhan College of Geology.

=== 1978–1987: Beijing graduate school ===
In 1978, the graduate school relocated back to Beijing under the support of Mr. Deng Xiaoping, the leader of the People’s Republic of China. In 1986, the Beijing Graduate School of Wuhan College of Geology was formally founded at the original campus of the former Beijing Institute of Geology on the Xueyuan Road.

=== 1987–2005: Two campuses of CUG ===
In 1987, Wuhan College of Geology was renamed China University of Geosciences. The university kept two campuses, namely the Wuhan main campus and the Beijing graduate school campus, respectively. These two campuses hosted independent legal status. In 1997, the university was approved as one of key universities construction of the 211 project. In February 2000, the university was put under the administration of the Ministry of Education.

=== 2005–present: Independent CUGB ===
In March 2005, the university's two campuses split into two separate entities, with the main campus in Wuhan inheriting the name of China University of Geosciences (abbr. CUG) and the graduate campus in Beijing becoming CUGB. In September 2006, CUGB was officially established under joint leadership of the Ministry of Education and the Ministry of Land and Resources. Since then it is no longer a graduate-only school but also operates undergraduate programs. At the same year, CUGB was listed as the 985 Project Innovation Platform. Together with the CUG in Wuhan, CUGB is also listed as a Double First-Class Construction university of China.

== Culture ==
The overall design of CUGB's emblem is in the shape of the letter "U," resembling a bud about to blossom, symbolizing a promising future. The emblem is in a specific deep blue color (#004e97, named "geology blue") and features the Chinese and English names of the university, the founding year "1952," as well as several core elements, including a geological hammer, a compass, a hand lens, and lines representing the Earth's latitude and longitude. Although CUGB and China University of Geosciences (CUG) in Wuhan split into separate entities in 2005, the original name "China University of Geosciences" still appears on CUGB's emblem.

The anthem of CUGB is the theme song "Song of the Exploration Team" from the old movie "The Young Generation," with lyrics by Tong Zhixian and music composed by Xiao He. This song has been popular among students since the time of Beijing Institute of Geology. On June 19, 1990, during the 9th School Affairs Council meeting, "Song of the Exploration Team" was officially designated as the university anthem.

== Image gallery ==
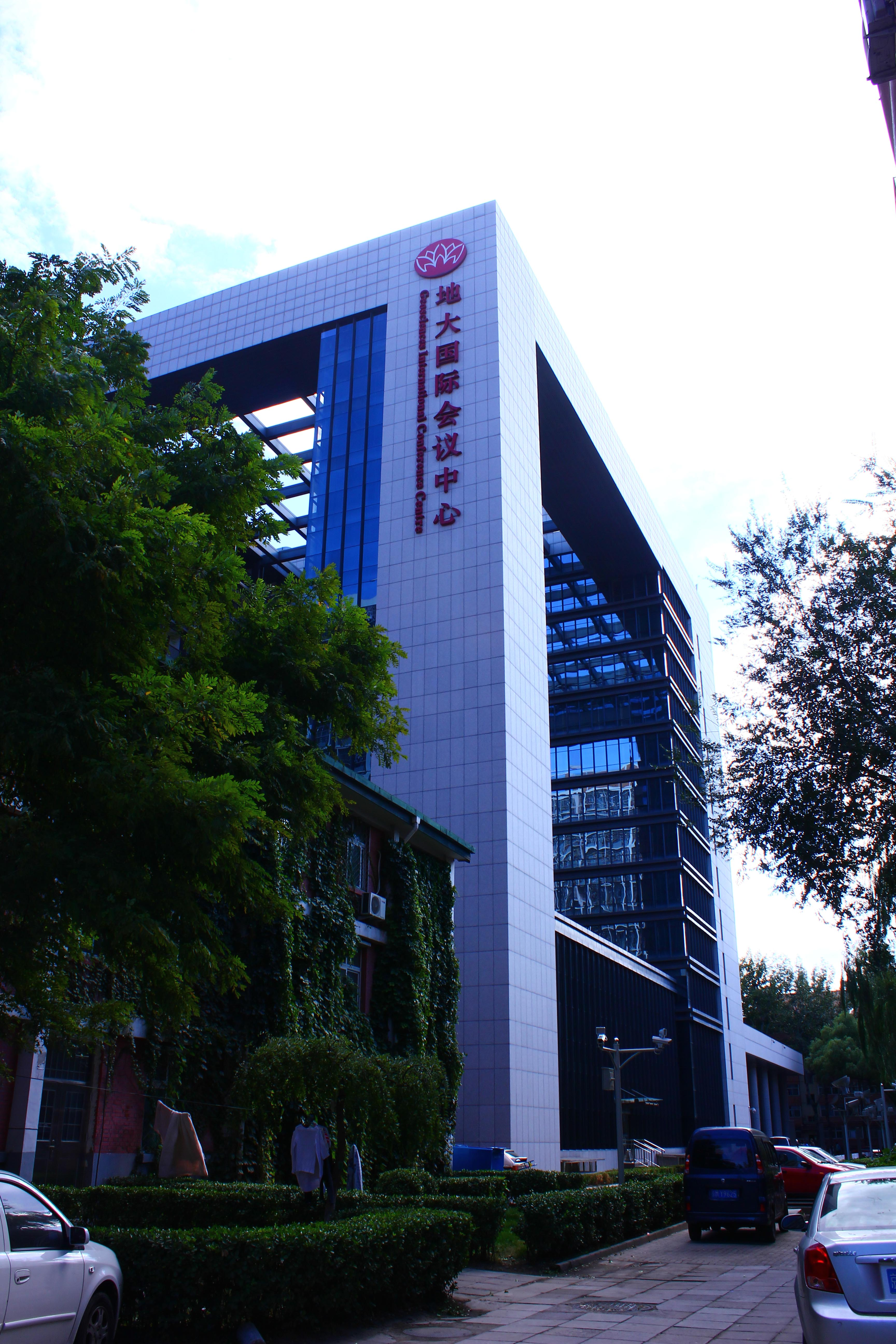

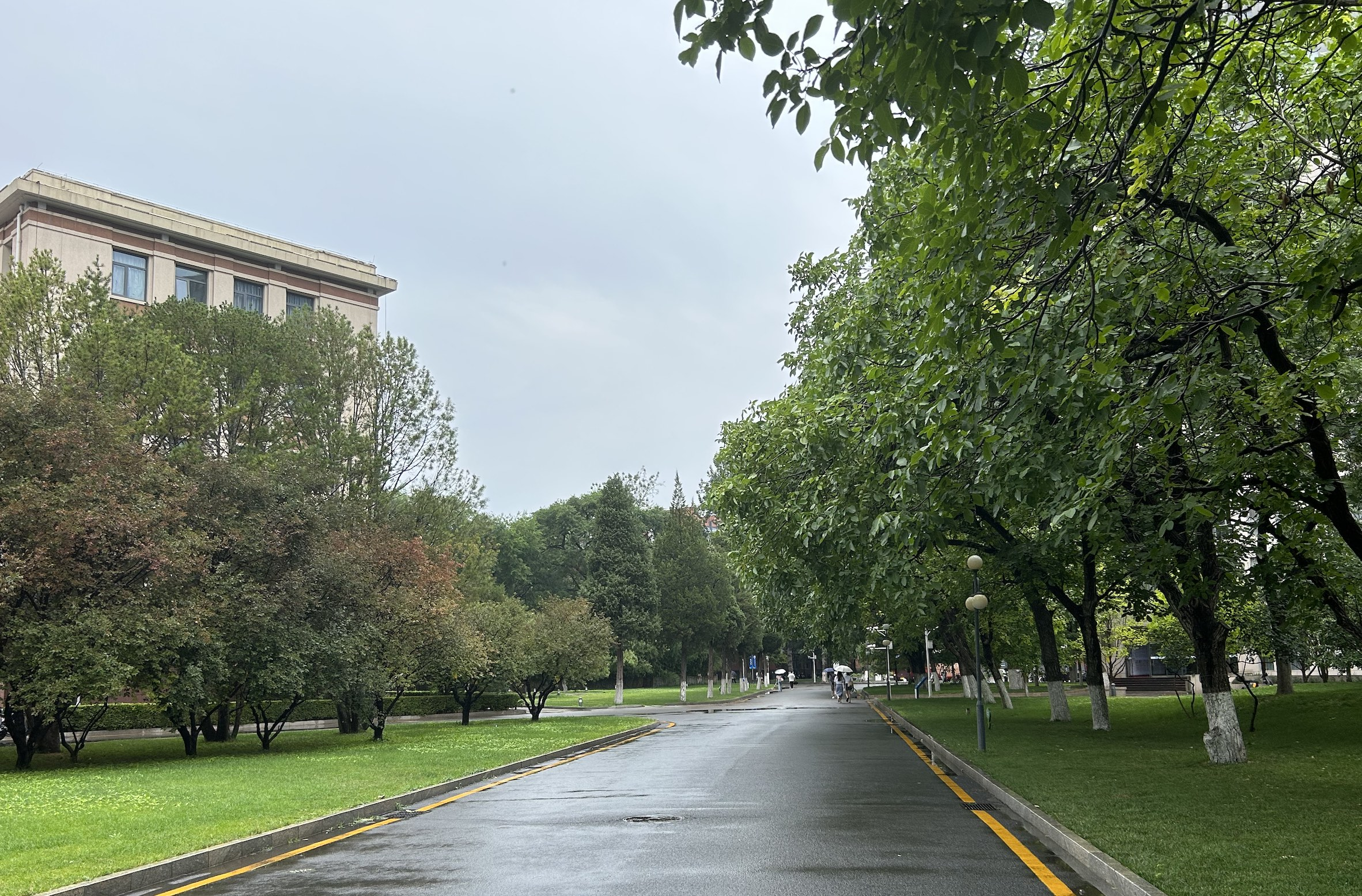

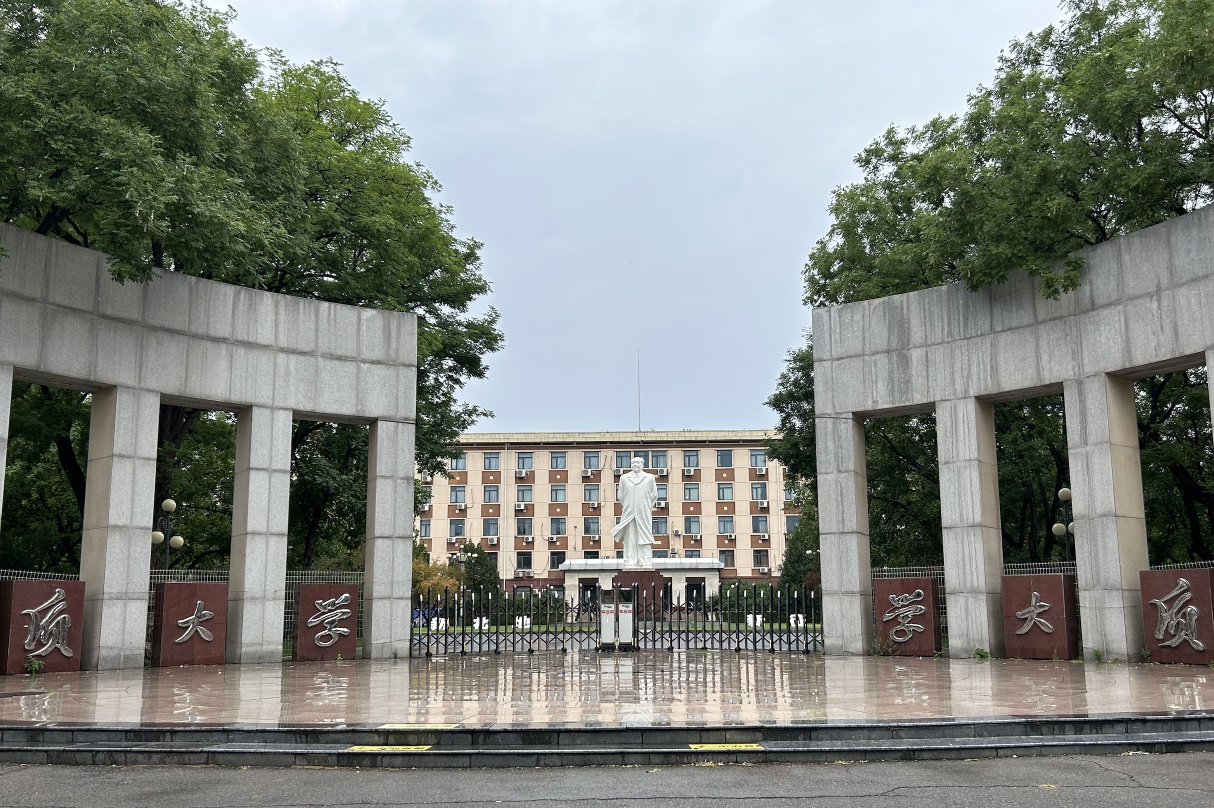

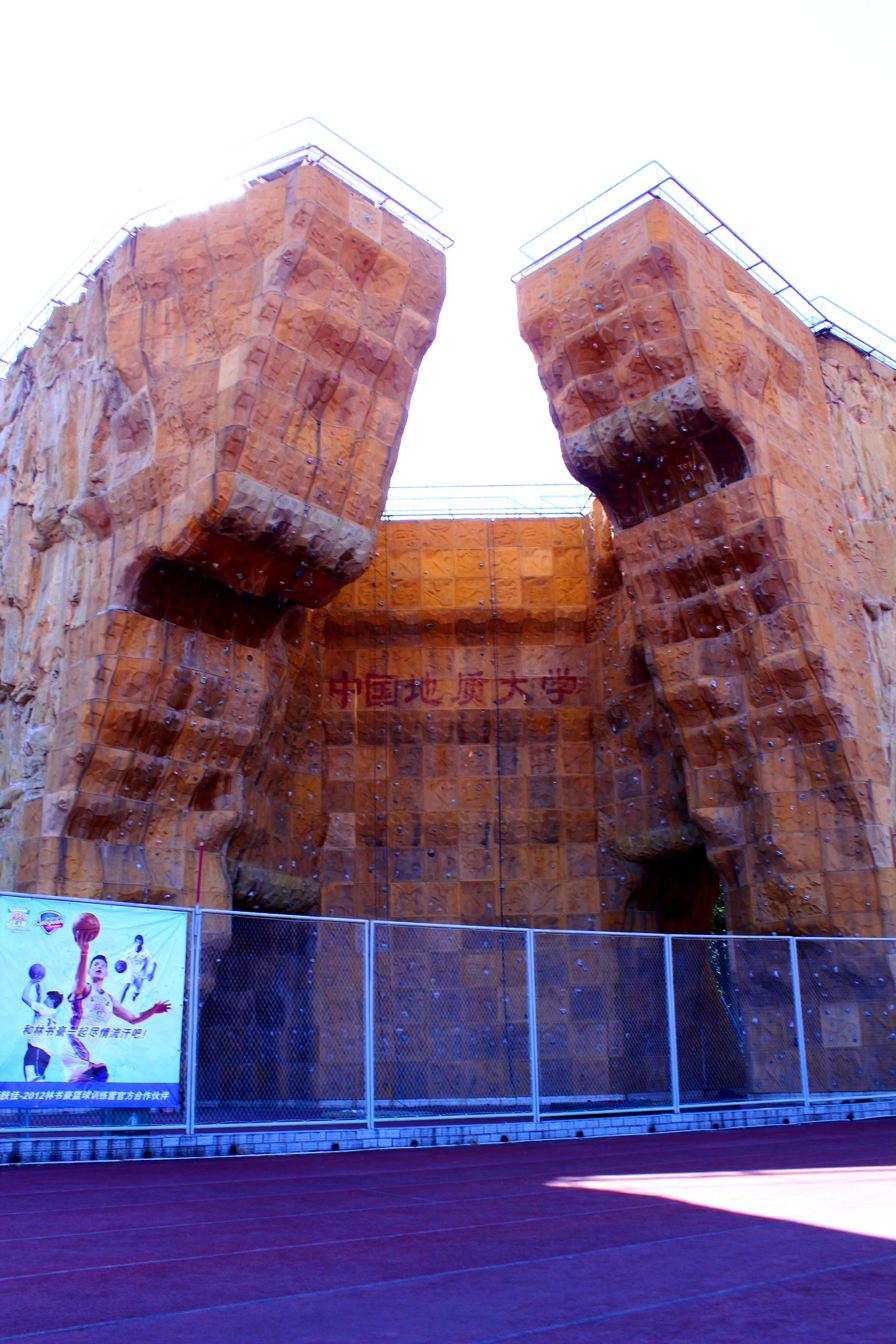

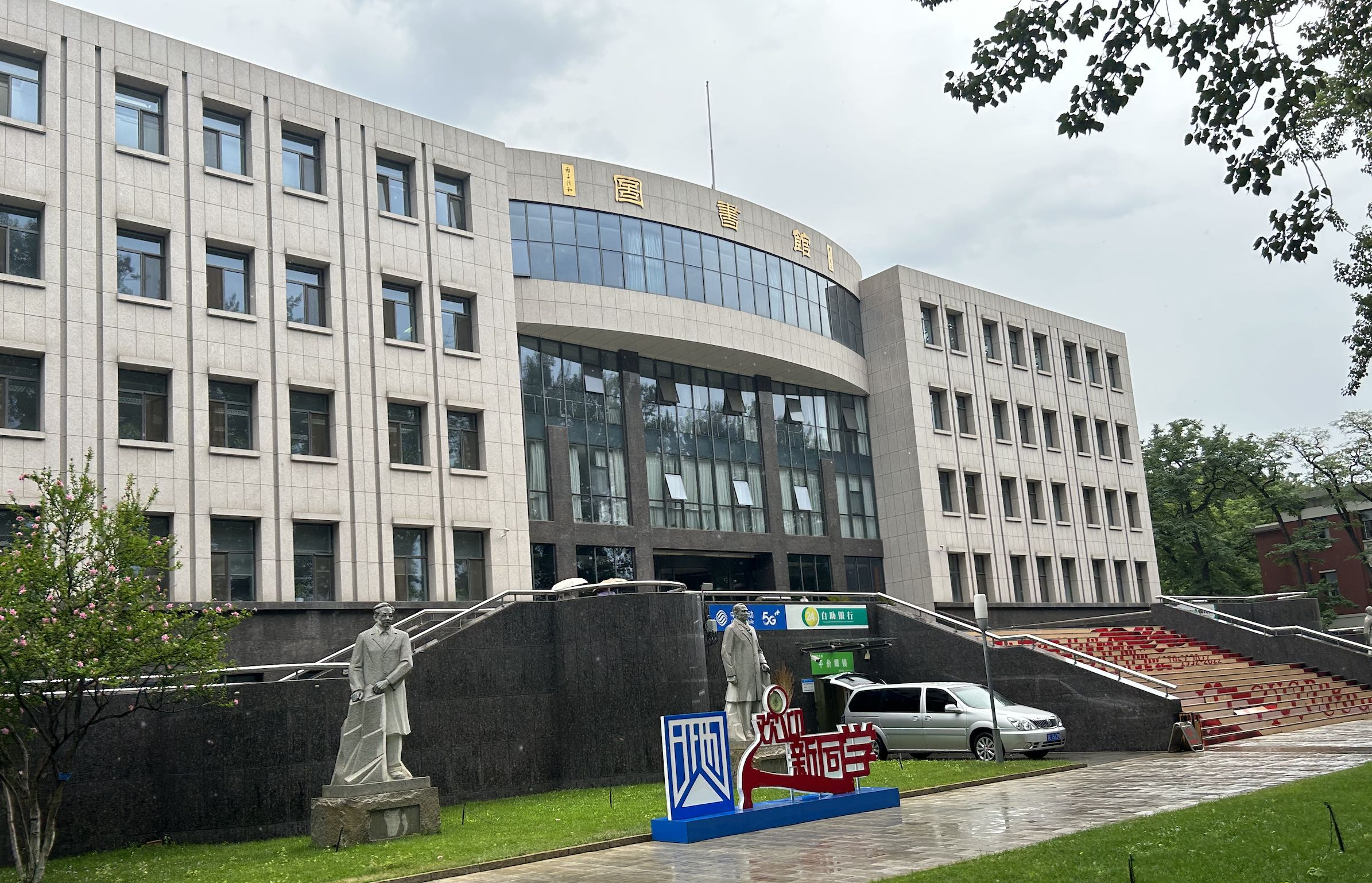

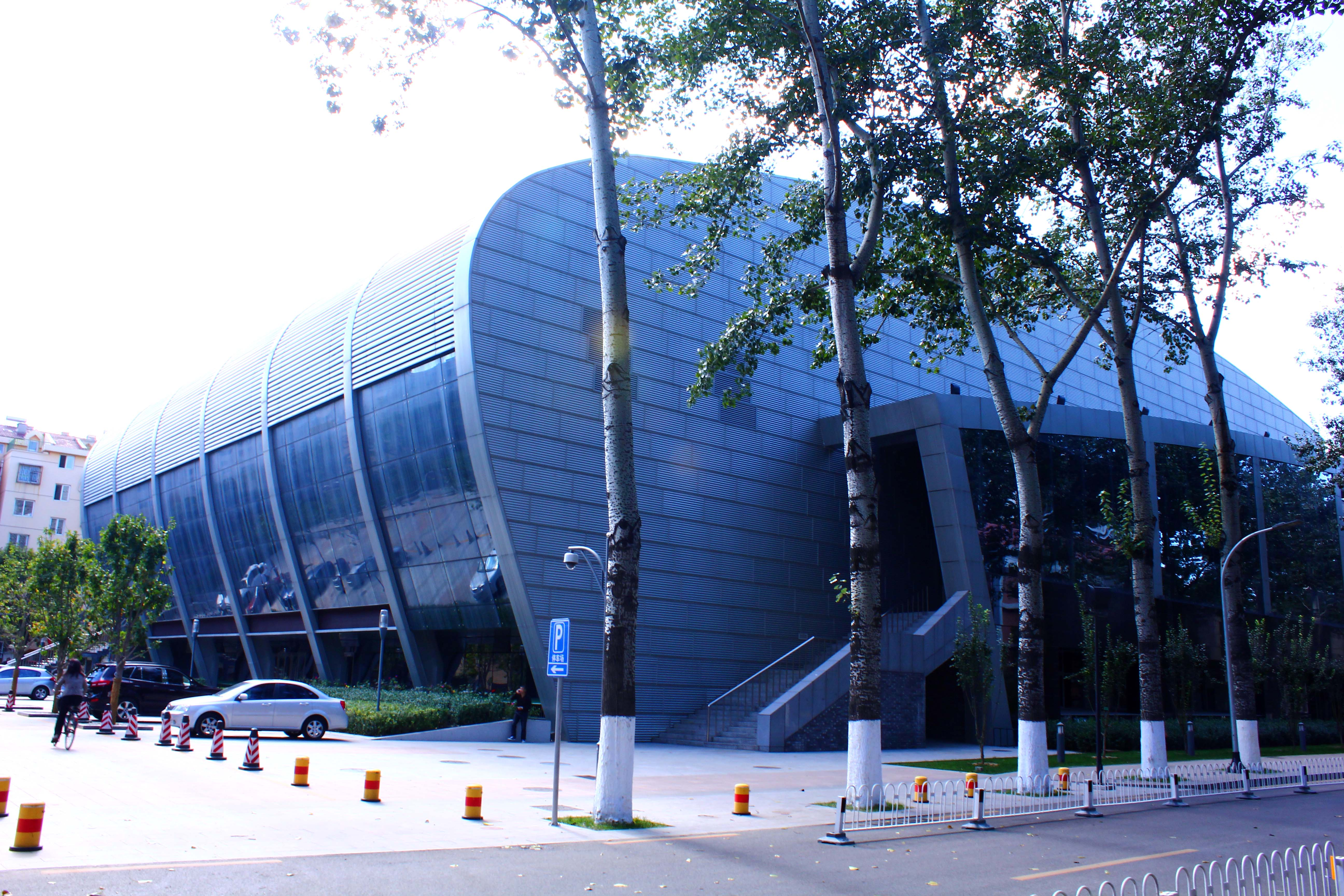

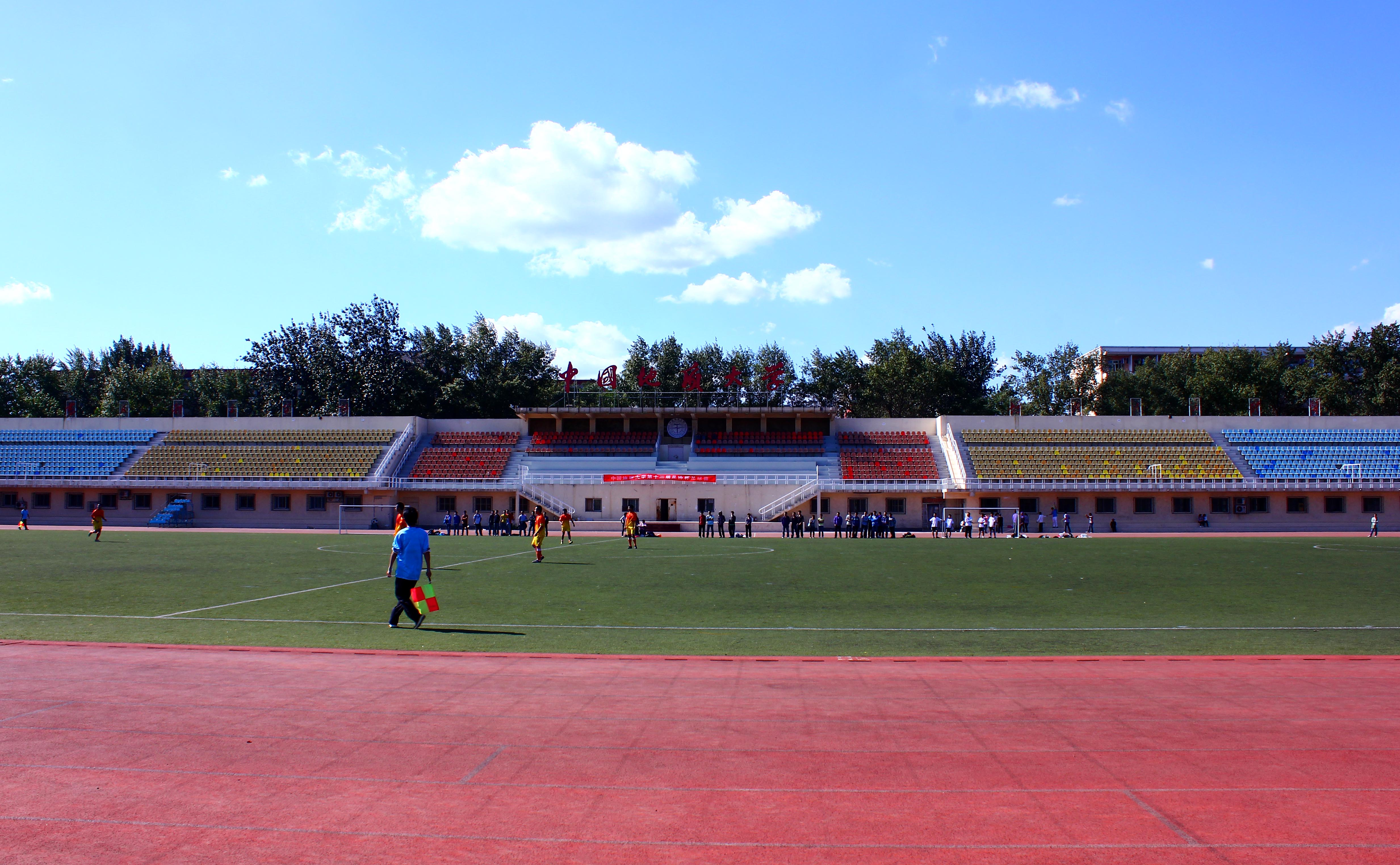

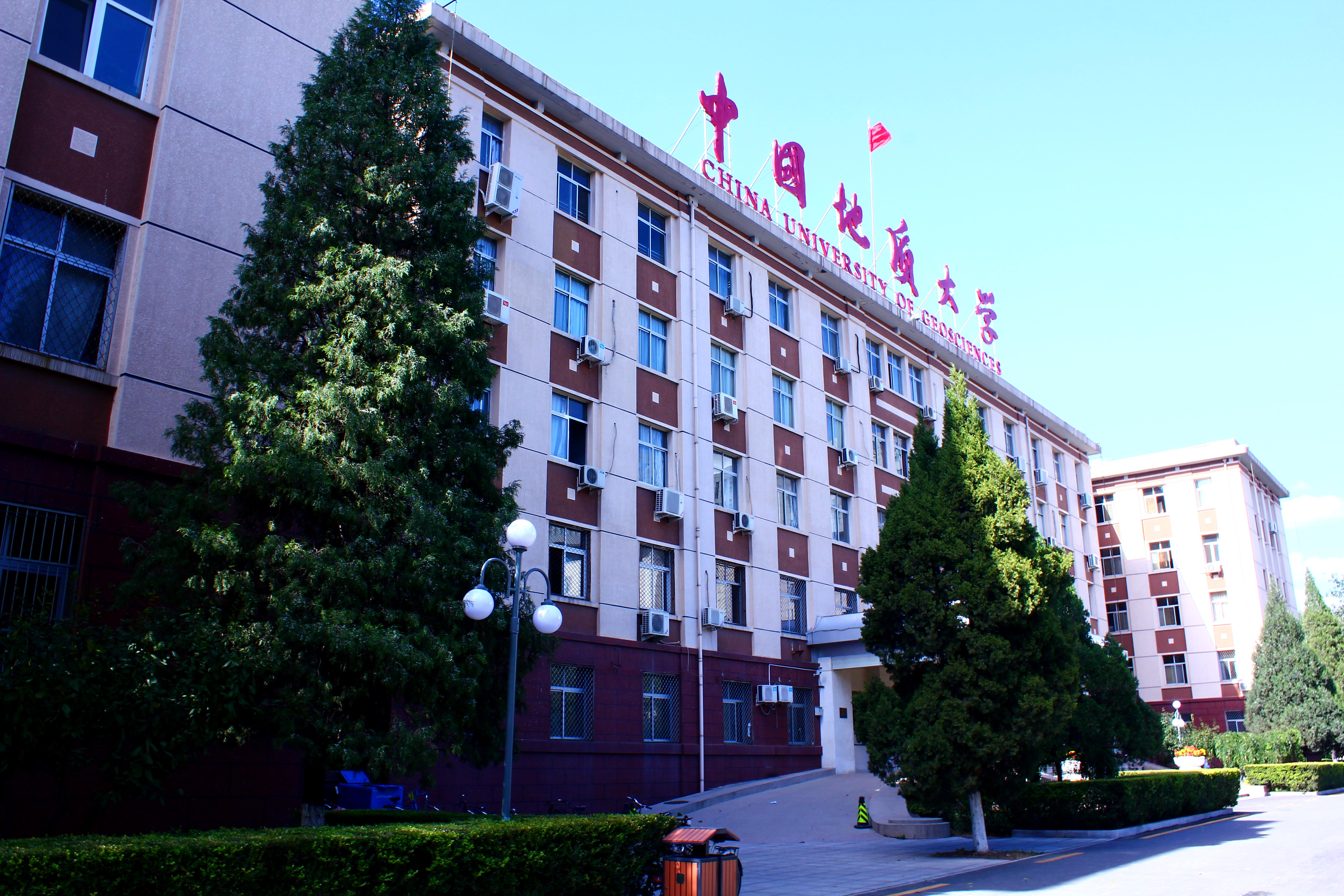

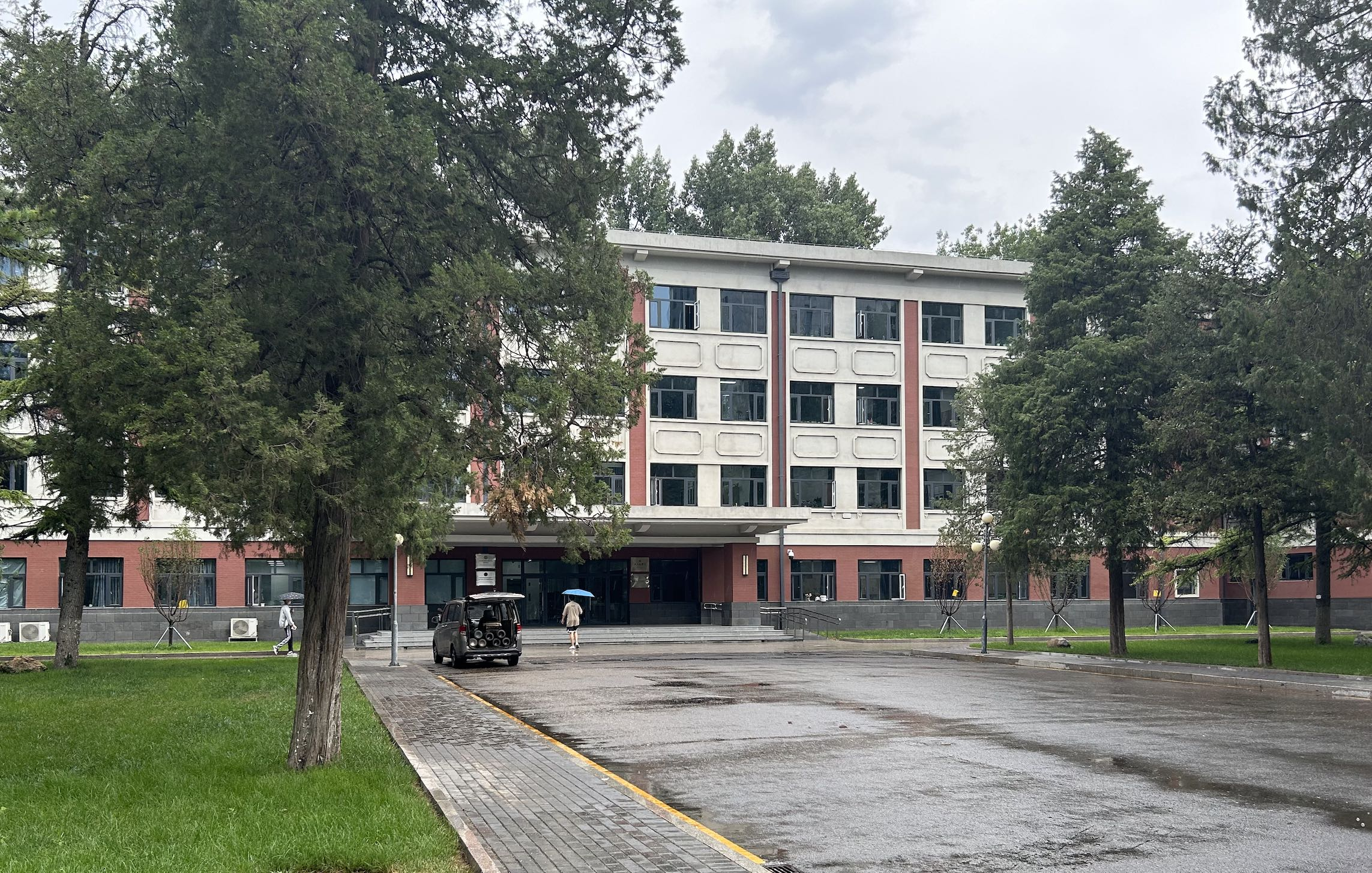

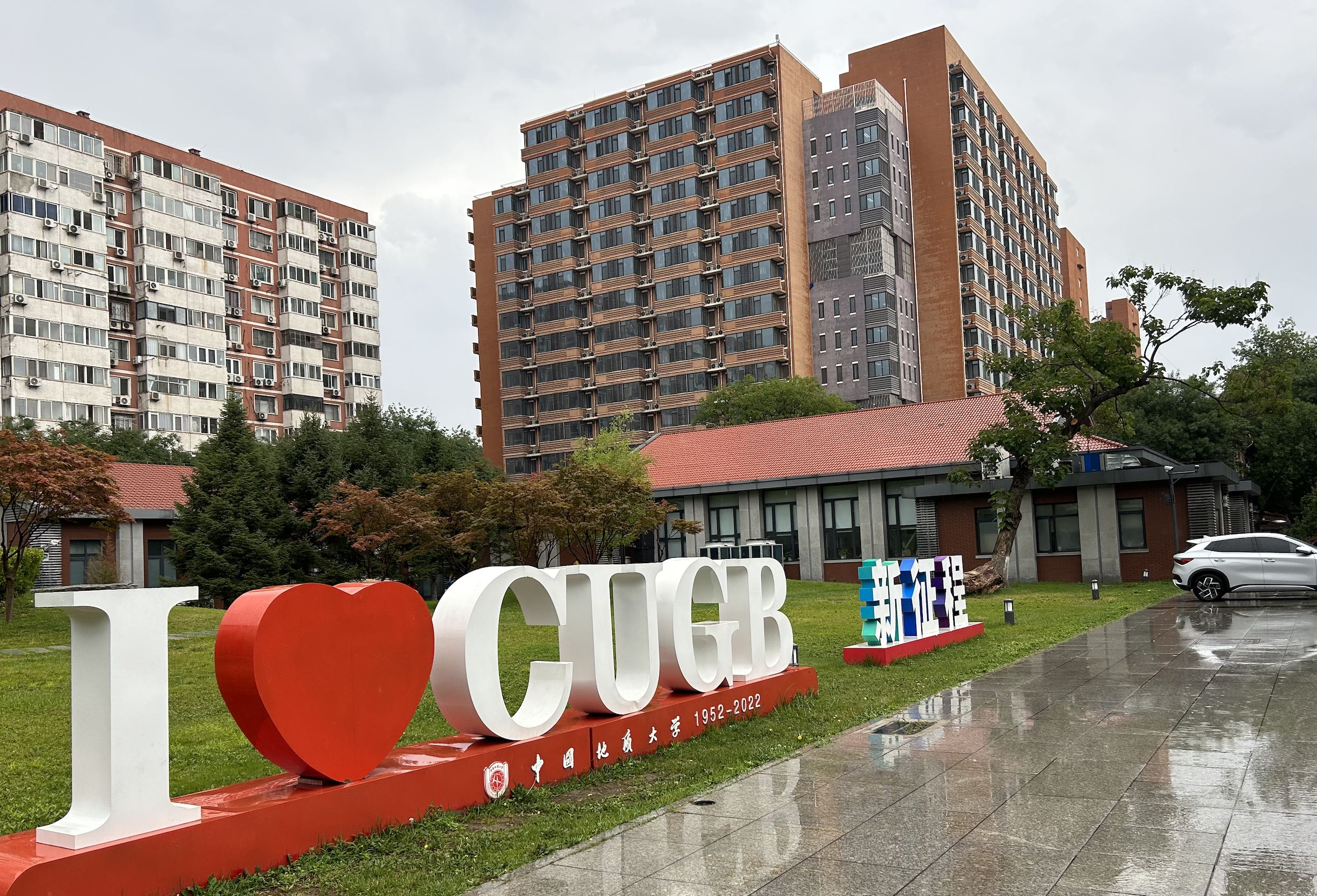

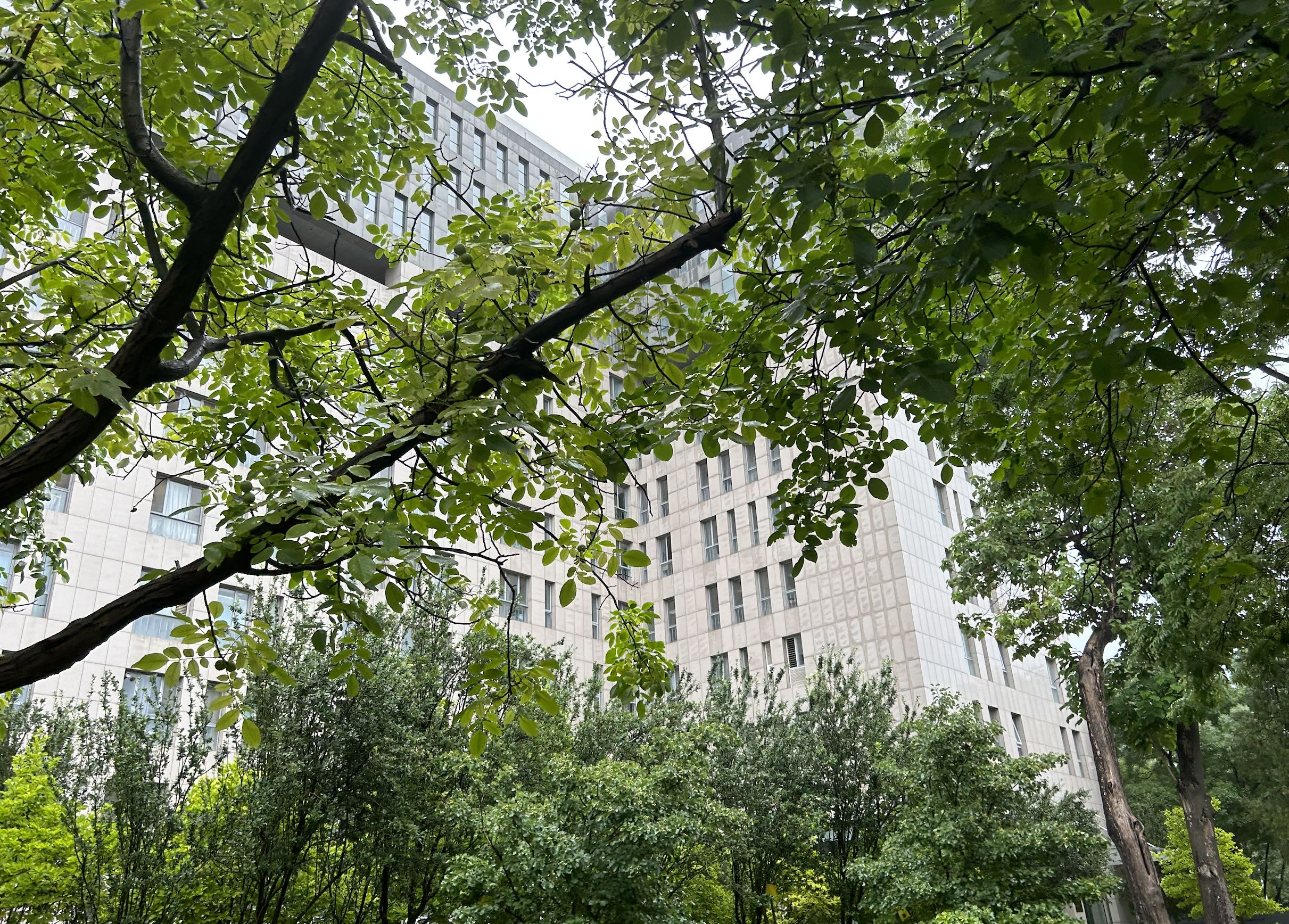

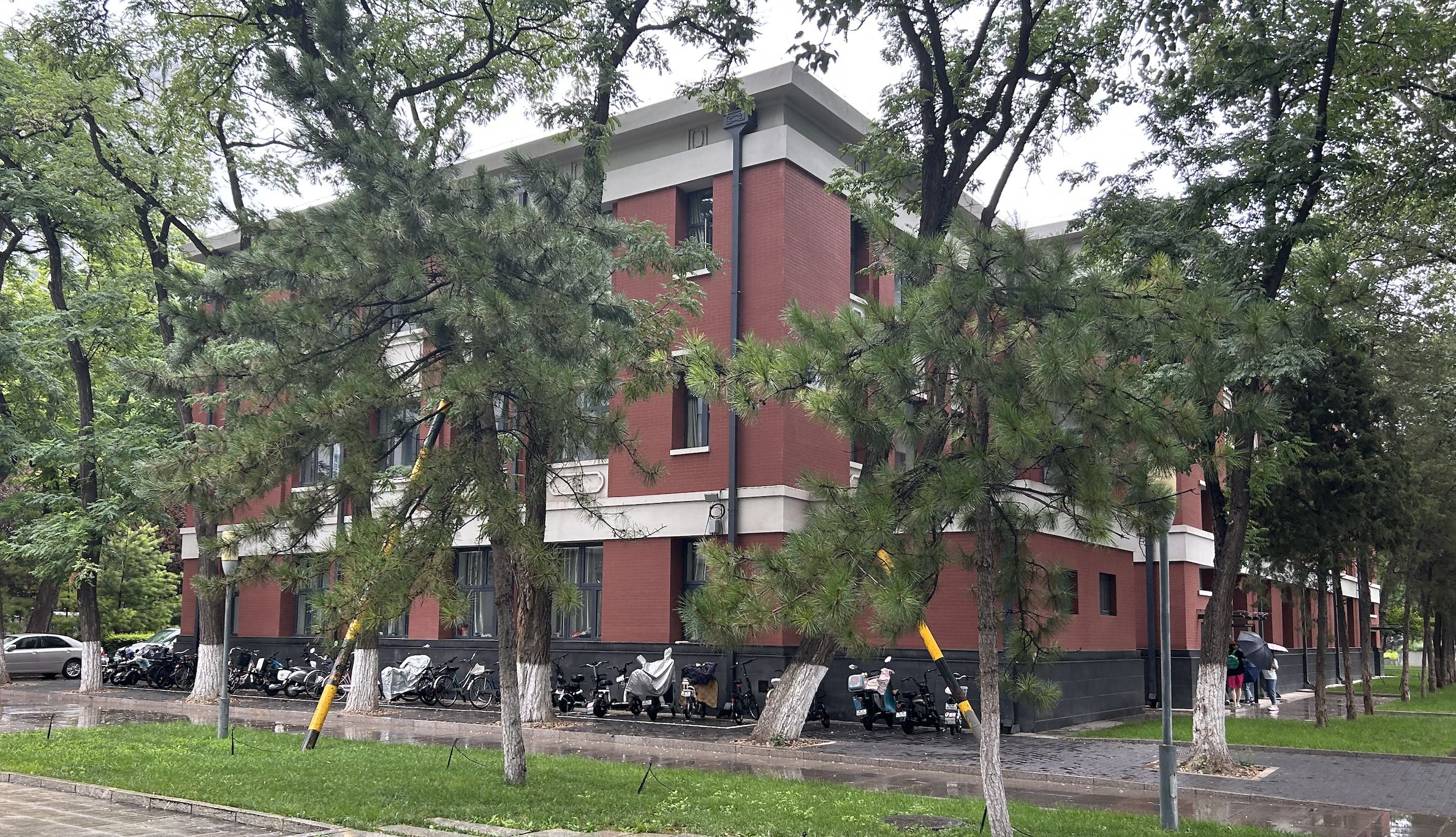

== Notable alumni ==
In accordance with local Chinese custom, the surname is written in front of the first name.

- Li Zhixin, Chinese mountaineer
- Zhang Wenyue, former provincial governor of Liaoning Province
- Ouyang Ziyuan, chief scientist of Chinese Lunar Project
- Wen Jiabao, former Premier of the State Council of the People's Republic of China
- Jin Yuzhang, head of the House of Aisin-Gioro
- Wang Anshun, mayor of Beijing
- Zhao Pengda, mathematical geologist
- Zhang Yiwei, geologist, former president of China University of Petroleum
- Liu Baojun, sedimentary geologist
- Fu Jiamo, environmental geochemist
- Meemann Chang, paleobiologist and recipient of L'Oréal-UNESCO For Women in Science Awards
- Wang Shuangming, coal prospecting engineer
- Gao Shan, geologist
- Zhang Benren, geochemist
- Wang Fuzhou, Chinese mountaineer
- Peng Jianbing, engineering geologist
- Wang Yongfeng, Chinese mountaineer
- Sun Jinlong, Chinese politician of the Ministry of Ecology and Environment

== See also ==
- China University of Geosciences (Wuhan)
- Geology of China
- Wen Jiabao
- Double First-Class Construction
- Project 211
- List of colleges and universities
