= Wang Shuangming =

Chinese engineer

- 王双明
- Born: 21 May 1955 (age 71); Qishan County, Shaanxi, China
- Education: Xi'an University of Science and Technology; China University of Geosciences (Beijing)
- Scientific career
- Fields: Coal resources and geological exploration
- Workplaces: Xi'an University of Science and Technology

Chinese name
- Simplified Chinese: 王双明
- Traditional Chinese: 王雙明
Transcriptions
Standard Mandarin
- Hanyu Pinyin: Wáng Shuāngmíng

Wang Shuangming (born 21 May 1955) is a Chinese engineer who is a professor at Xi'an University of Science and Technology, and an academician of the Chinese Academy of Engineering.

== Biography ==
Wang was born in Qishan County, Shaanxi, on 21 May 1955. In 1977, he graduated from Xi'an Institute of Mining (now Xi'an University of Science and Technology), where he majored in coalfield geology. He went on to receive his master's degree in coal geology and exploration from Beijing Graduate Department of Wuhan University of Geosciences (now China University of Geosciences (Beijing)) in 1983.

Beginning in 1983, he served in several posts in Shaanxi Coalfield Geology Bureau, including technician, engineer, chief engineer (1992–1996), deputy director (1996–2000), and director (2000–2010). In August 2010, he became a party member in the Shaanxi Provincial Department of Land and Resources, concurrently serving as president and deputy party chief of Shaanxi Geological Survey. He is now a professor at Xi'an University of Science and Technology.

== Honours and awards ==
- 1997 State Science and Technology Progress Award (Second Class)
- 2010 State Science and Technology Progress Award (Second Class)
- 2011 State Science and Technology Progress Award (Second Class)
- 27 November 2017 Member of the Chinese Academy of Engineering (CAE))
