= Peng Jianbing =

Chinese geologist

- 彭建兵
- Born: April 1953 (age 73); Macheng, Hubei, China
- Education: China University of Geosciences (Wuhan); Chang'an University
- Scientific career
- Fields: Engineering geology and disaster geology
- Workplaces: Chang'an University
- Doctoral advisor: Hu Guangtao (胡广韬)

Peng Jianbing (Chinese: 彭建兵; pinyin: Péng Jiànbīng; born April 1953) is a Chinese geologist currently serving as doctoral supervisor and dean of the School of Geology Engineering and Geomatics, Chang'an University.

== Education ==
Peng was born in Macheng, Hubei in April 1953. In 1978 he graduated from China University of Geosciences (Wuhan). He earned his Ph.D. degree in engineering from Xi'an Institute of Engineering (now Chang'an University) in June 1999.

== Career ==
From 1978 to 1997 he assumed various posts in Xi'an Institute of Geology. He taught at Xi'an Institute of Engineering between 1997 and 2000. He was dean of the College of Geological Engineering and Geomatics, Chang’an University in 2000, and held that office until 2011. He has been dean of the School of Geology Engineering and Geomatics, Chang'an University since 2011.

== Honours and awards ==
- 2015 14th Li Siguang Geological Science Award
- November 22, 2019 Member of the Chinese Academy of Sciences (CAS)
