= Gao Shan =

Gao Shan 高山
- Born: June 30, 1962; Xining, Qinghai, China
- Died: May 3, 2016 (aged 53); Wuhan, Hubei, China
- Education: Northwest University (BA); China University of Geosciences (MA, PhD)
- Scientific career
- Fields: Geochemistry
- Workplaces: University of Göttingen; China University of Geosciences

Gao Shan (Chinese: 高山; pinyin: Gāo Shān; June 30, 1962 – May 3, 2016) was a Chinese geochemist and academician of the Chinese Academy of Sciences (CAS). He was a professor of geochemistry at the China University of Geosciences (Wuhan).

== Biography ==
Gao obtained a bachelor's degree of geology from Northwest University (China) in 1982. He was enrolled to China University of Geosciences (Wuhan) in 1985 when he obtained a master's degree. He received his PhD from China University of Geosciences in 1989. Following this, he was an Alexander von Humboldt Foundation post-doctoral scientist at the Geochemisches institute, University of Göttingen, before he returned to China to take up a faculty position at China University of Geosciences. His interests included chemical composition of the continental crust, chemical exchange between the crust and the mantle, and laser ablation ICP-MS and its applications to in-situ elemental and isotopic analysis of minerals. He published authoritative articles on the chemical composition of the continental crust and contributed to unravelling the history of decratonization in the North China Craton.

Gao was elected as a member of the Chinese Academy of Sciences in December 2011. He was also a fellow of the Royal Society of Chemistry (2009), Geochemical Society (2014) and European Association of Geochemistry (2014).

Gao died in Wuhan on May 3, 2016.
