= Zhang Benren =

Chinese geochemist

Zhang Benren (Chinese: 张本仁; 28 May 1929 – 1 November 2016) was a Chinese geochemist.

Born on 28 May 1929 in Huaiyuan County, Anhui, Zhang studied geology at Nanjing University, graduating in 1952. He then earned a degree from the Beijing Institute of Geology in 1956 and later became a faculty member. Zhang was elected an academician of the Chinese Academy of Sciences in 1999 and received the State Natural Science Award.

Zhang died at the age of 87 in 2016.
