= Sha Aimin =

President of Chang'an University
- Incumbent
- Assumed office 2019

Personal details
- Born: 1964 (age 61–62) Xuancheng, Anhui, China
- Education: Kharkiv National Highway Automotive Technology University, Ukraine
- Profession: University President
- Scientific career
- Fields: Highway transportation
- Workplaces: Chang'an University

Sha Aimin is currently the President of Chang'an University, China and a professor of highway engineering.

== Early life ==
Sha was born in Xuancheng, Anhui, China in 1964. He completed his Ph.D. in transportation engineering from Kharkiv National Highway Automotive Technology University, Ukraine.

== Career ==
From 2006-2017, Sha was a deputy president of Chang'an University. In 2019, he was appointed president. His research is related to highway engineering and he has published several papers on this subject. He is Vice Chairman of Road Engineering Branch of China Highway Society and a Director of the Academic Committee of the World Transport Congress (WTC).
