= Hua-Wei Zhou =

American geophysicist

Hua-wei Zhou (周华伟; born 1957) is an American geophysicist, focusing in earthquake seismology, exploration geophysics, digital data processing, geodynamics and seismic tomography, currently the Margaret S. Sheriff College Professorship in Geophysics at University of Houston and formerly the Joe Pevehouse Endowed Chair at Texas Tech University.

== Early life ==
Zhou was born in Beijing in 1957. After his high school graduation in 1974, he worked at the Jiangsu Geological Survey Office before gaining admission to the Wuhan College of Geology (now the China University of Geosciences) in the 1977 examinations. He completed a B.S. in mathematics there in 1980 before going on the California State University, Long Beach for his M.S. in geology (1984) and the California Institute of Technology for his Ph.D. (1989).
