= List of schools of journalism and communication in China =

The following list is the list of the ranking of the universities in the People's Republic of China in the specialized subject of Journalism and Communication taught in ENGLISH. The ranking is made by China Academic Degrees & Graduate Education Development Center (an administrative department directly under the Ministry of Education, P.R.C) in 2009.

Ranking	University	School / Faculty	Notes
1-5	Renmin University of China	School of Journalism and Communication	China's 1st ranked in Media Economics and Journalism field.
1-5	Communication University of China	School of Journalism, Faculty of Journalism & Communication	China's 1st ranked in International Communication field.
1-5	Fudan University	Fudan Journalism School	China's 1st ranked in the field of Global Media in master's degree Program.
1-5	Tsinghua University	Tsinghua School of Journalism and Communication	China's 1st ranked in Ph.D. Program in Communication, China's 1st ranked in H-Index and 2nd Ranked by QS World University Ranking by communication subject in 2012.
1-5	Wuhan University	School of Journalism and Communication	
6	Zhejiang University	School of Journalism and Communication	
7	Peking University	School of Journalism and Communication	China's 1st ranked by QS World University Ranking by communication subject 2012
7	Nanjing University	School of Journalism and Communication	
7	Huazhong University of Science and Technology	Journalism and Information Communication School	
10	Xiamen University	School of Journalism and Communication	
11	University of Shanghai for Science and Technology	Faculty of Journalism	
11	Jinan University	School of Journalism and Communication	
13	Shanghai Jiao Tong University	School of Media and Design	
13	Sichuan University	College of Literature and Journalism	
15	Tianjin Normal University	School of Journalism and Communication	
15	East China Normal University	School of Communication	
15	Hunan University	School of Journalism and Communication	
18	China University of Political Science and Law	School of Journalism and Communication	
18	Suzhou University	School of Journalism and Communication	
18	Zhengzhou University	School of Journalism and Communication	
18	Wuhan University of Technology	Faculty of Journalism	
18	Southwest University of Political Science and Law	School of Journalism and Communication	
23	Tongji University	Faculty of Journalism	
23	China University of Geosciences	School of Arts and Communication	
23	Guangxi University	School of Journalism and Communication	
23	Chongqing University	College of Literature and Journalism	
23	Yunnan Normal University	Communication School	
23	Shaanxi Normal University	School of Journalism and Communication	
23	Lanzhou University	School of Journalism and Communication	
30	Liaoning University	Faculty of Journalism	
30	Northeast Normal University	Faculty of Journalism	
