= Li Zhixin =

Chinese mountaineer

Li Zhixin (Chinese: 李致新; pinyin: Lǐ Zhìxīn; born 1962) is a leading Chinese mountaineer and director of the Mountaineering Sports Administrative Center (MSAC) of the State General Administration of Sports. He is also the executive vice-president of the Chinese Mountaineering Association (CMA). Li Zhixin and his partner, Wang Yongfeng (王勇峰), became the first Chinese couple to climb the "Seven Summits" on June 23, 1999.

== Biography ==
Li Zhixin was born in Dalian, Liaoning Province. He graduated from the Wuhan Institute of Geology in 1985. Li and Wang Yongfeng became friends in this Institute. They were elected to the Wuhan Institute of Geology Mountaineering Team together in 1984. He started his mountaineering career from then on.
