= Ouyang Ziyuan =

Chinese cosmochemist and geochemist (born 1935)

- 歐陽自遠
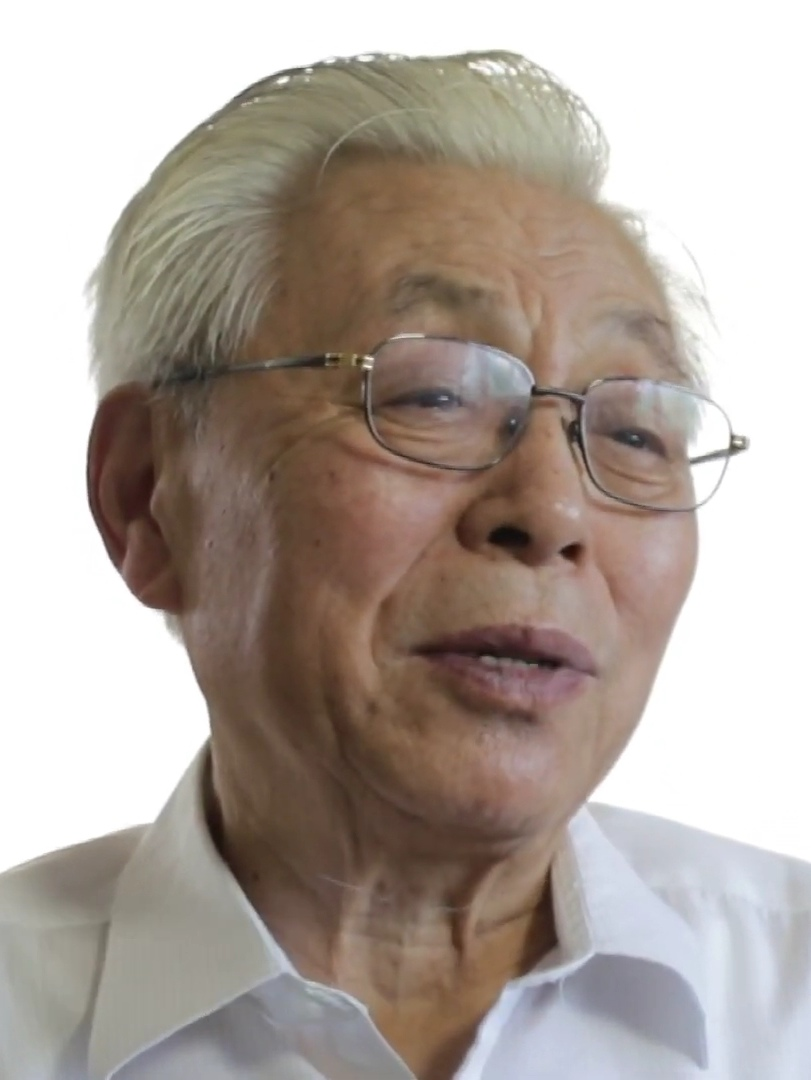
- Born: October 9, 1935 (age 90); Ji'an, Jiangxi, China
- Education: Beijing College of Geology; Beijing Institute of Geology
- Occupations: Cosmochemist, geochemist
- Known for: Spaceflight advocacy and research

Ouyang Ziyuan (simplified Chinese: 欧阳自远; traditional Chinese: 歐陽自遠; pinyin: Ōuyáng Zìyuǎn, born October 9, 1935) is a Chinese cosmochemist, geochemist and space advocate. He is a research professor at the Institute of Geochemistry of the Chinese Academy of Sciences. Asteroid 8919 Ouyangziyuan, discovered in 1996, was named in his honor.

== Career ==
Ouyang was born in 1935 in Ji'an, Jiangxi. He obtained a degree in geology at the Beijing College of Geology and a doctorate in mineral deposits and geochemistry at the Beijing Institute of Geology. Thereafter, Ouyang spent many years conducting studies in deep mines. He later studied nuclear physics and worked in a particle accelerator laboratory. He later put forward a hypothesis on the formation of iron meteorites, an evolutionary model of the formation of the meteorites which fell at Jilin in 1976, and a theory of multi-stage cosmic ray radiation history. His works include Celestial Chemistry, and he has published more than 160 scientific treatises. He was elected a Member of the Chinese Academy of Sciences in 1991.

== Space advocacy ==
As an expert in geological research on underground nuclear tests and extraterrestrial materials, Ouyang was among the first to advocate not only the exploitation of lunar reserves of metals such as iron, but also the mining of lunar helium-3, an ideal fuel for nuclear fusion power plants. Ouyang is now the chief scientist of the Chinese Lunar Exploration Program (CLEP), also known as the Chang'e program. He is the most prominent supporter of the Chinese crewed lunar exploration program, and also lobbies for the Chinese exploration of Mars.

On November 12, 2008, upon China's publication of a comprehensive lunar surface map, Ouyang encouraged all three Asian nations then involved in lunar exploration (China, India and Japan) to increase co-operation in furthering humanity's understanding of the Moon.

== See also ==
- Chinese space program
