= China University of Geosciences (Wuhan) =

Public university in Wuhan, Hubei, China

- 中国地质大学（武汉）
- Former names: Beijing Institute of Geology; Hubei College of Geology; Wuhan College of Geology
- Motto: 艰苦朴素 求真务实
- Motto in English: Being austere and simple, keeping on practice and acting for truth
- Type: National public
- Established: 1952; 74 years ago
- Academic affiliations: Double First-Class Construction
- Chairman: He Guangcai (何光彩)
- President: Wang Yanxin (王焰新)
- Location: Wuhan, Hubei, China; 30°31′18″N 114°24′00″E
- Campus: Urban
- Website: www.cug.edu.cn

The China University of Geosciences (Wuhan) is a public university in Wuhan, Hubei, China. It is affiliated with the Ministry of Education, and co-funded by the Ministry of Education and the Hubei Provincial People's Government. The university is part of the Double First-Class Construction and Project 211.

The China University of Geosciences (Wuhan) and the China University of Geosciences (Beijing) are considered separate entities, although these two universities shared common history until 2005. CUG Wuhan and CUG Beijing have different constitutions, presidents, and governing boards, as well as separate legal entity registration, admission procedures, financial systems, Internet domains, and logos.

== Campuses ==
The Main Campus of CUG is referred to as Nanwangshan Mountain Campus, because the campus was located at the foot of Nanwangshan mountain and it also has a tunnel which connect west campus and north campus running through the mountain. It has a large annual enrollment and has a wide range of courses other than geosciences. Its Yifu Museum (donated by Sir Run Run Shaw) is known for housing China's top ranked displays of dinosaur fossils, mineral and rock specimens.

The New Campus of CUG was built in the future technology city of Wuhan. It opened in September 2019.

== History ==
The history of China University of Geosciences dates back to Beijing Institute of Geology (BIG; Chinese: 北京地质学院; pinyin: Běijīng Dìzhì Xuéyuàn) which was a merger of the geology departments of Tsinghua University, Peking University, Tianjin University and Tangshan Railway College in 1952. It was among China's first 16 key universities back in the 1950s. The university suspended operations from 1966 to 1970 due to the Cultural Revolution.

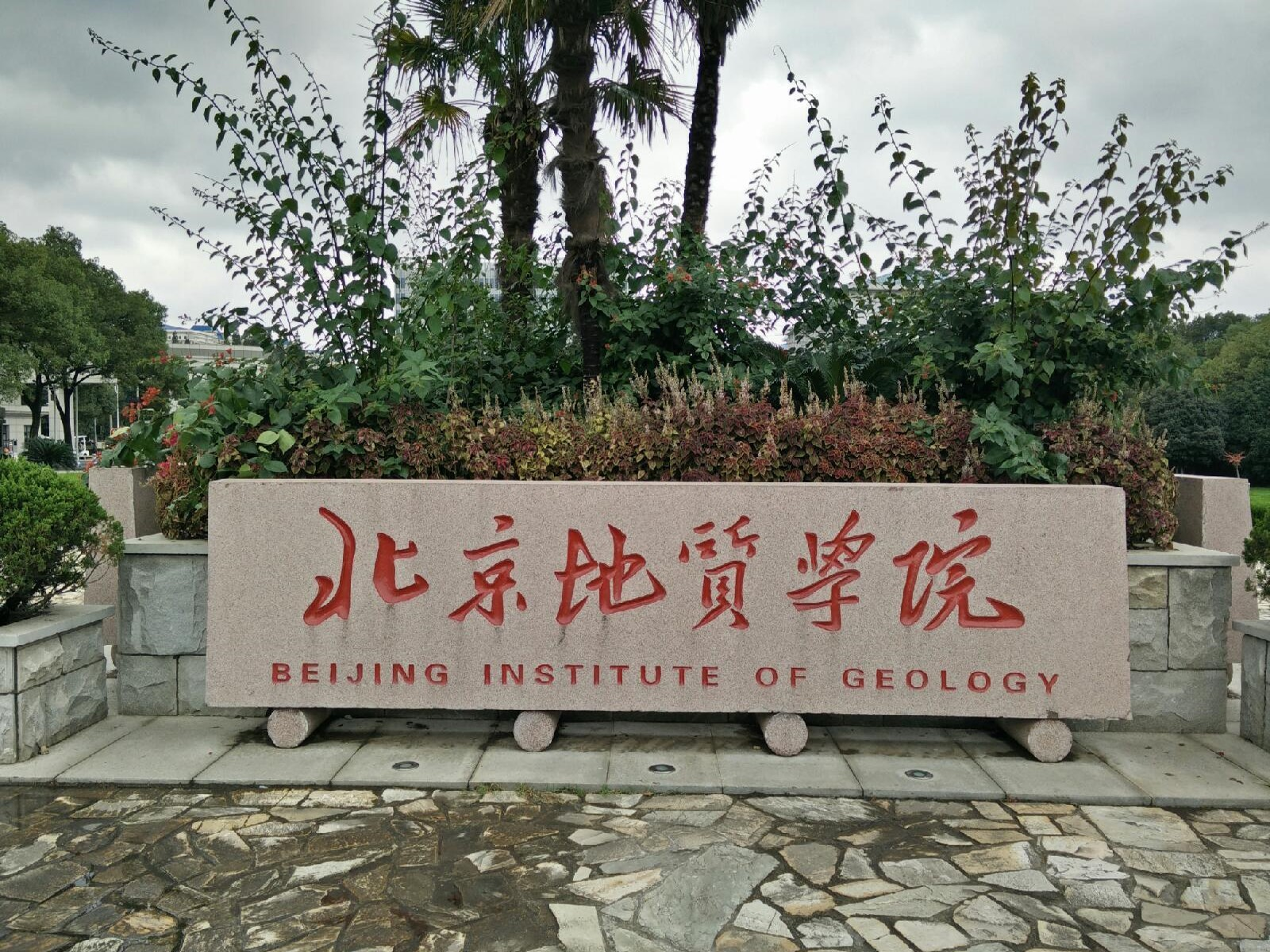

In 1970, the school reopened in Jiangling County, Hubei Province as Hubei College of Geology (湖北地质学院; 湖北地質學院; Húběi Dìzhì Xuéyuàn).

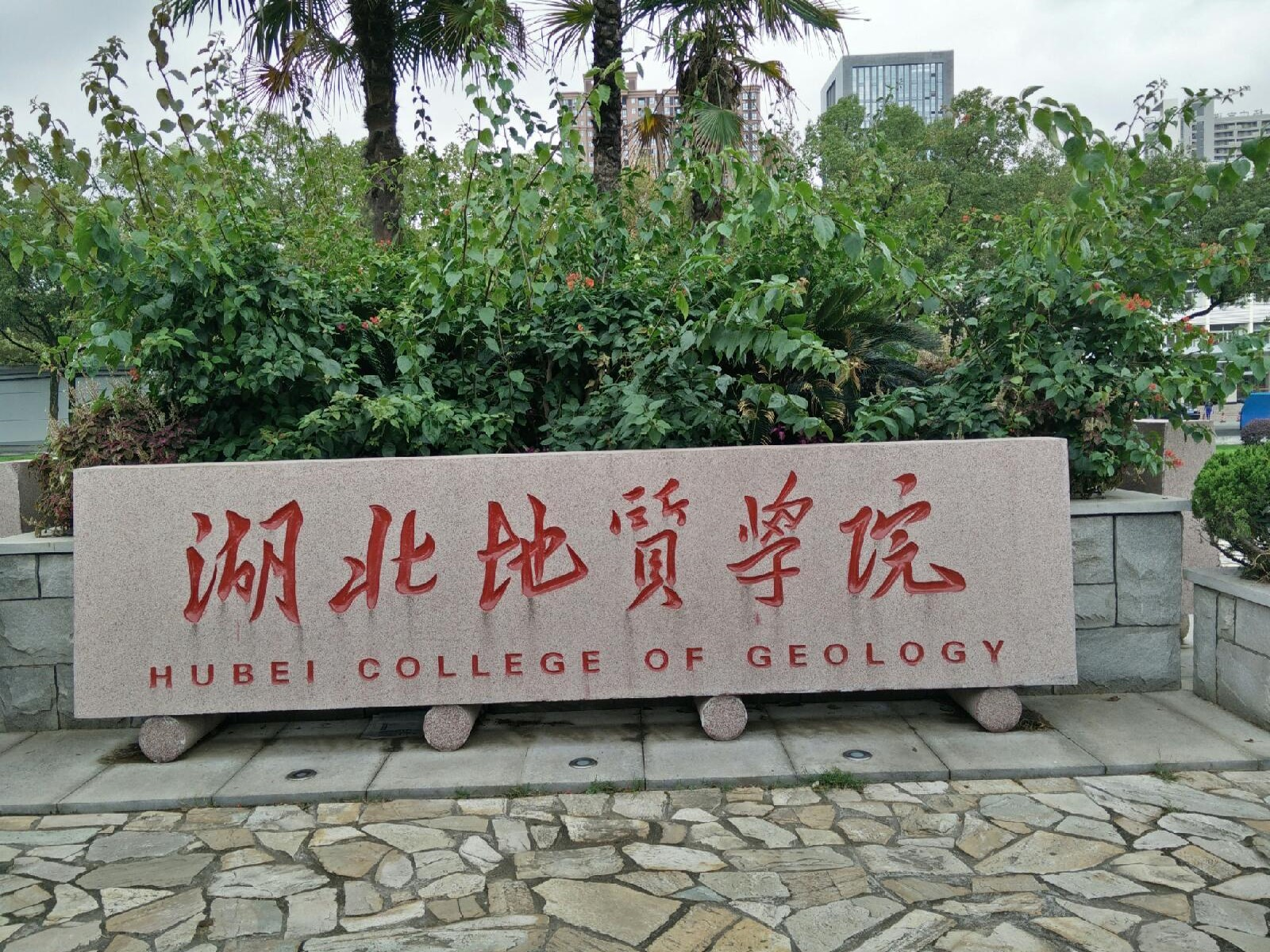

In 1975 the campus was moved to Wuhan, and the school was renamed Wuhan College of Geology (WCG; 武汉地质学院; 武漢地質學院; Wǔhàn Dìzhì Xuéyuàn). In 1978 BIG reopened in Beijing with the help of Deng Xiaoping. In 1986 the Chinese Government ratified the foundation of the Beijing Graduate School of WCG. It was ranked as one of the first 33 Graduate Schools nationwide.

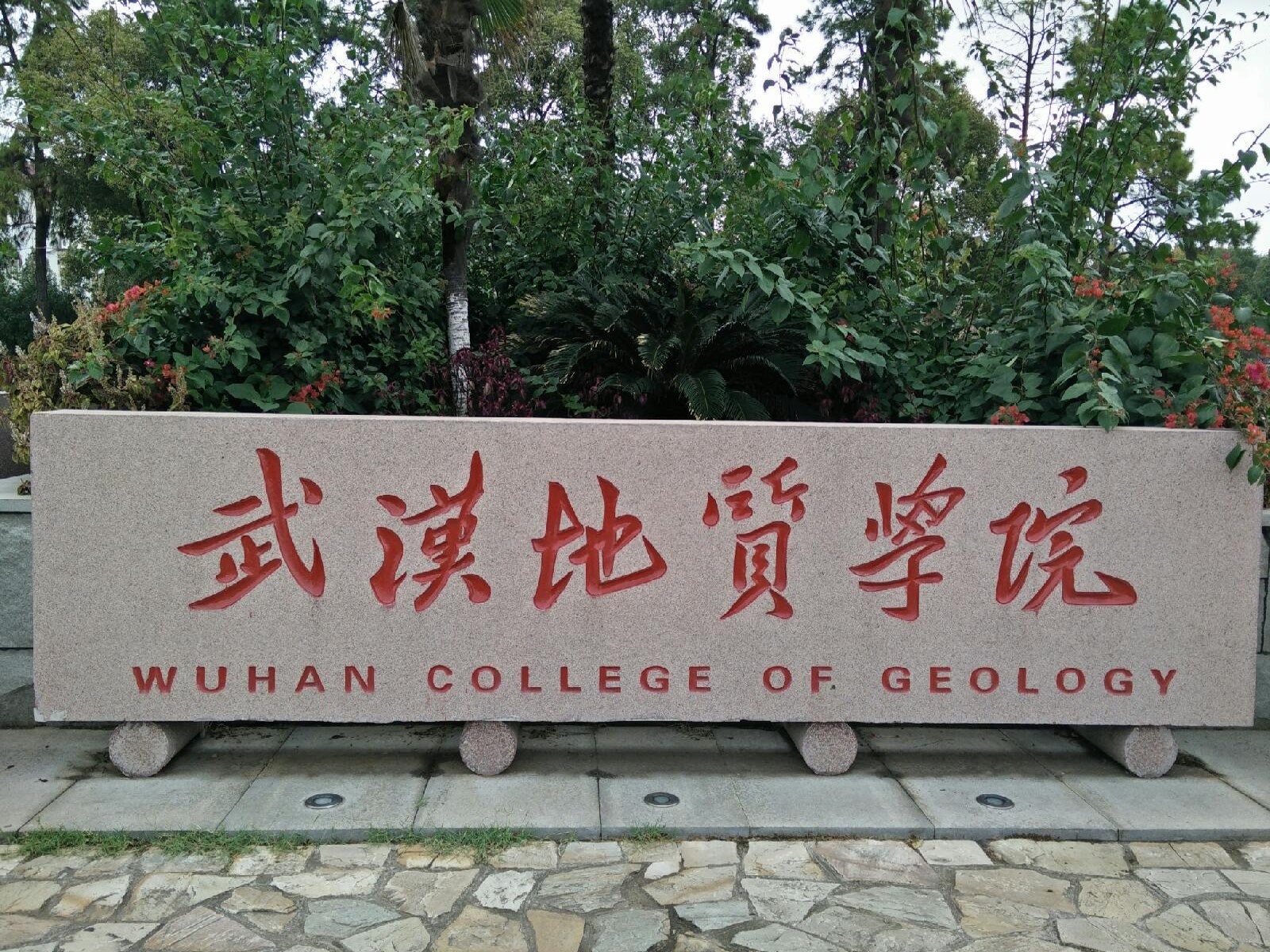

Later in 1987, WCG was renamed China University of Geosciences, and its branch campus in Beijing was renamed the Beijing Graduate School of China University of Geosciences. In 2005, the two campuses in Wuhan and Beijing were separated into two individual entities and renamed China University of Geosciences (CUG) and China University of Geosciences (Beijing) (CUGB), respectively. CUG is included in the Chinese state Double First Class University Plan.

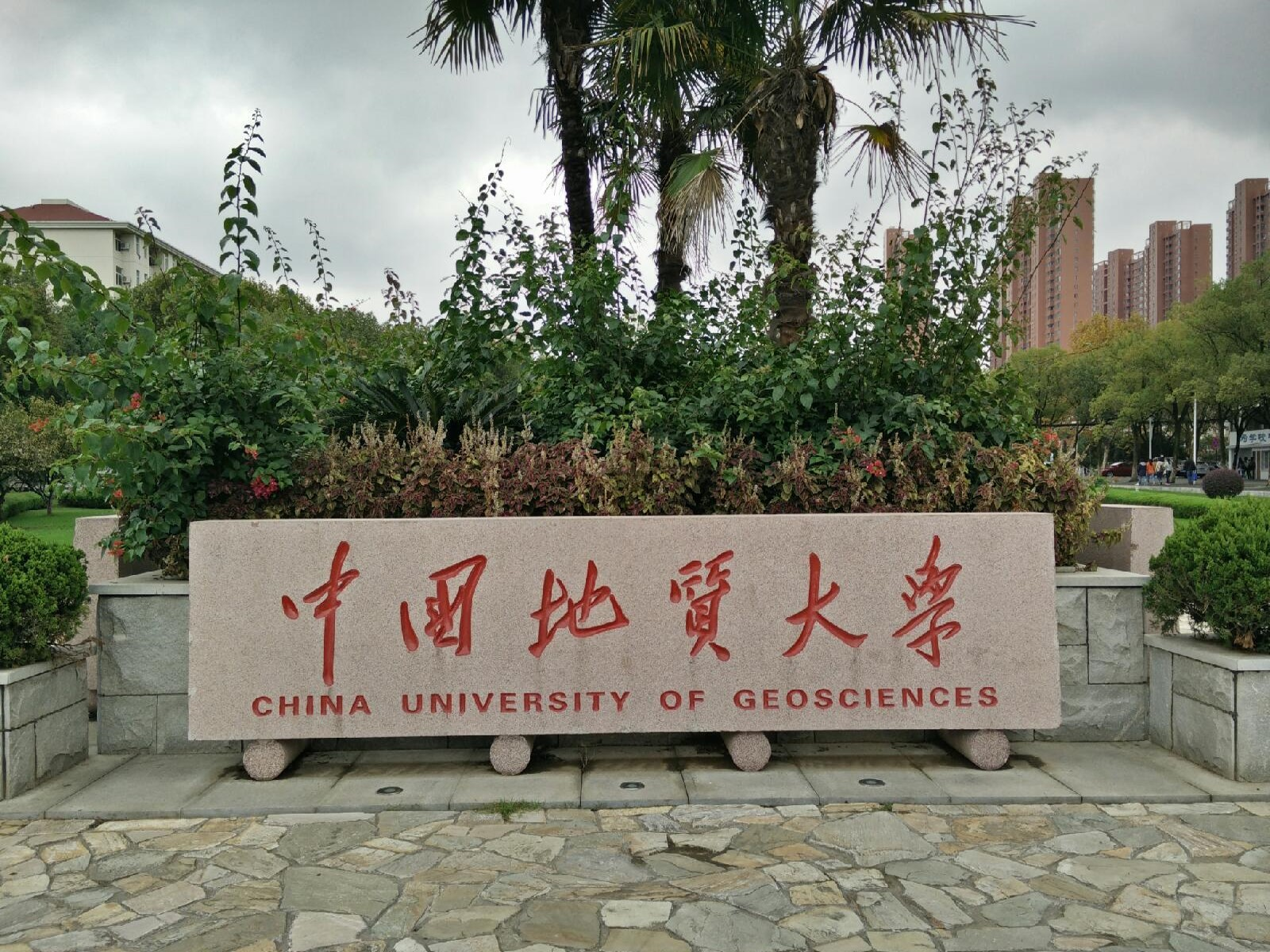

== Facilities ==
- National-level laboratories
  - State Key Laboratory of geological processes and mineral resources (GPMR)
  - State key Laboratory of Biogeology and Environmental Geology (BGEG)
  - National Engineering Research Center for Geographic Information System
- Provincial or ministerial-level laboratories
  - Key Laboratory of Tectonics and Petroleum Resources, Ministry of Education
  - Three Gorges Research Center for Geohazards, Ministry of Education
  - Key Laboratory of legal evaluation engineering of Ministry of land and resources
  - Engineering Research Center for nano mineral materials and applications, Ministry of Educatio

University rankings

Global – Overall
- QS World: 851-900 (2026)

- Field Training Centers
  - Zhoukoudian Field Training Center, located in Zhoukoudian, Beijing.
  - Beidaihe Field Training Center, located in Qinhuangdao, Hebei.
  - Zigui Field Training Center, located in Zigui County, Hubei.

== Journals ==
- Earth Science (in Chinese, ISSN 1000-2383; Ei Compendex)
- Journal of Earth Science (in English, ISSN 1674-487X; SCIE)

== Image gallery ==
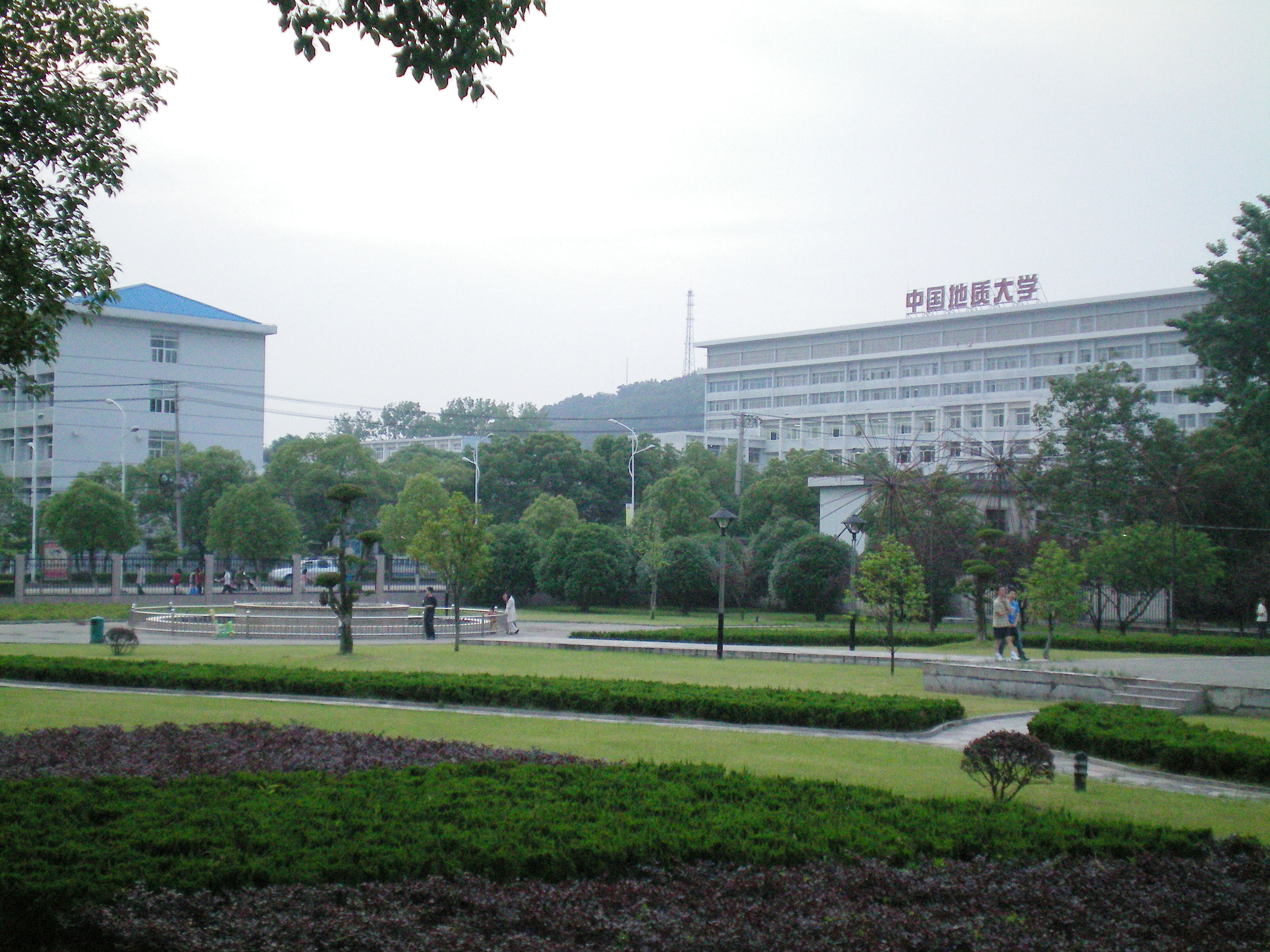

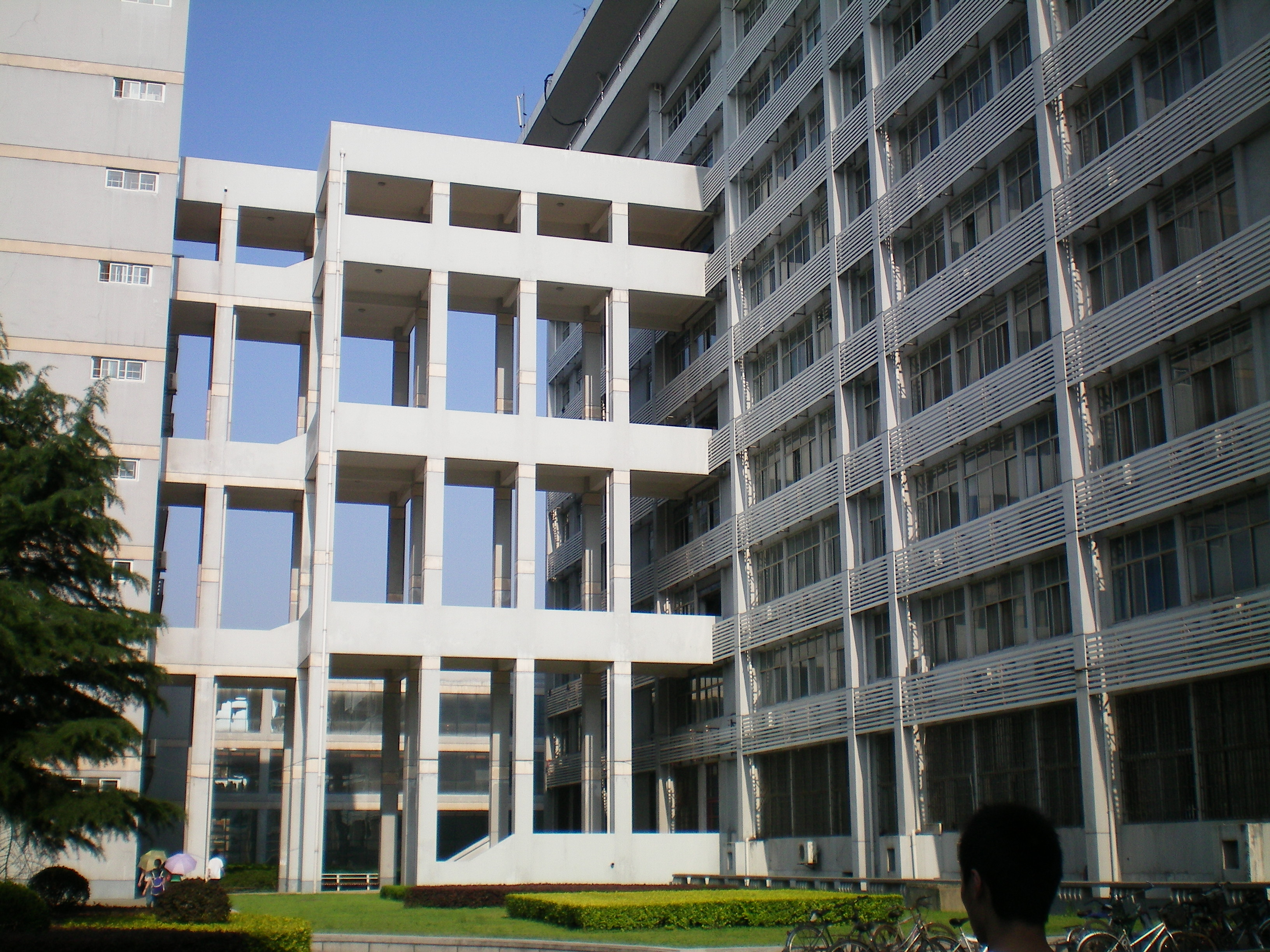

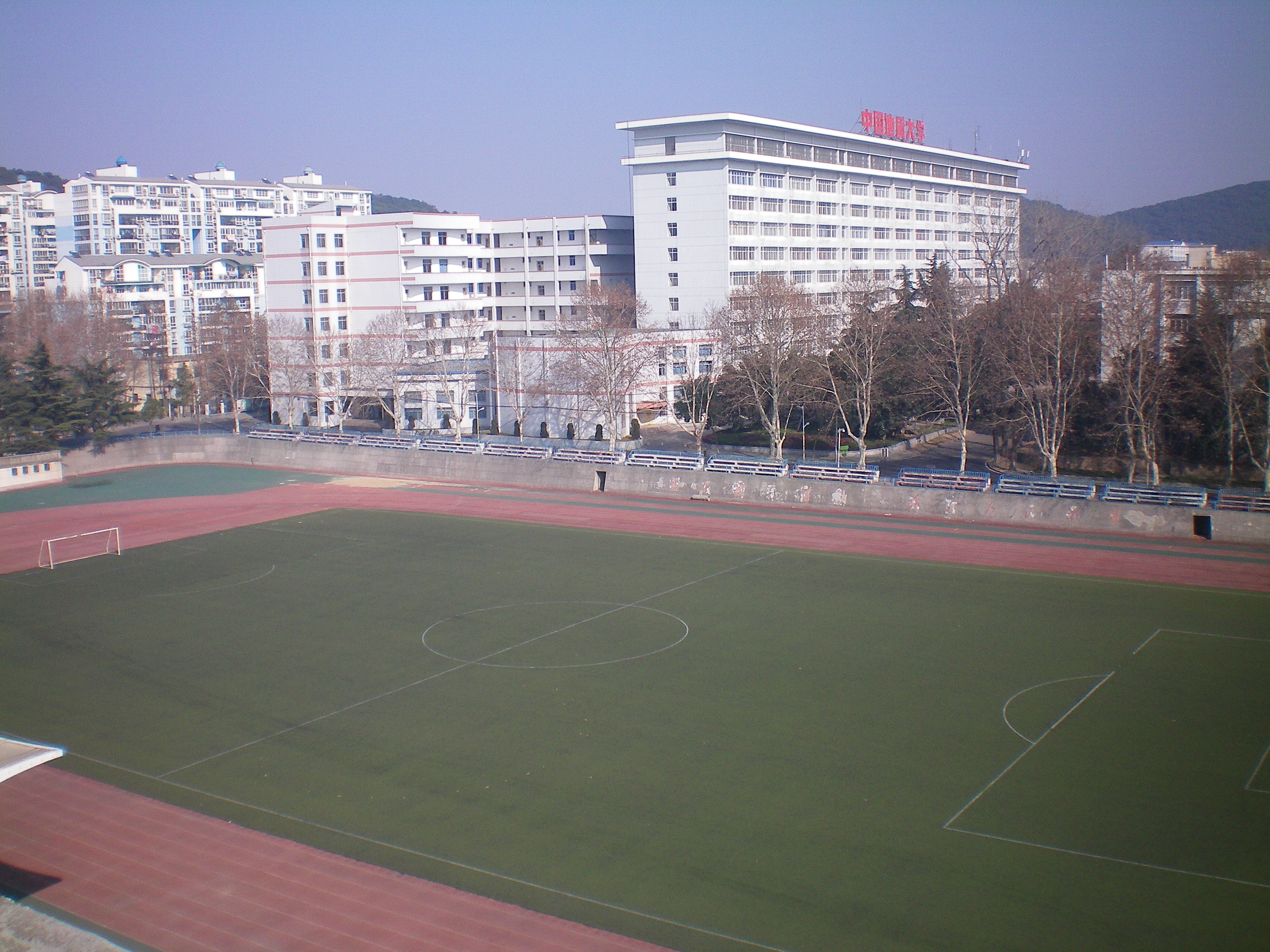

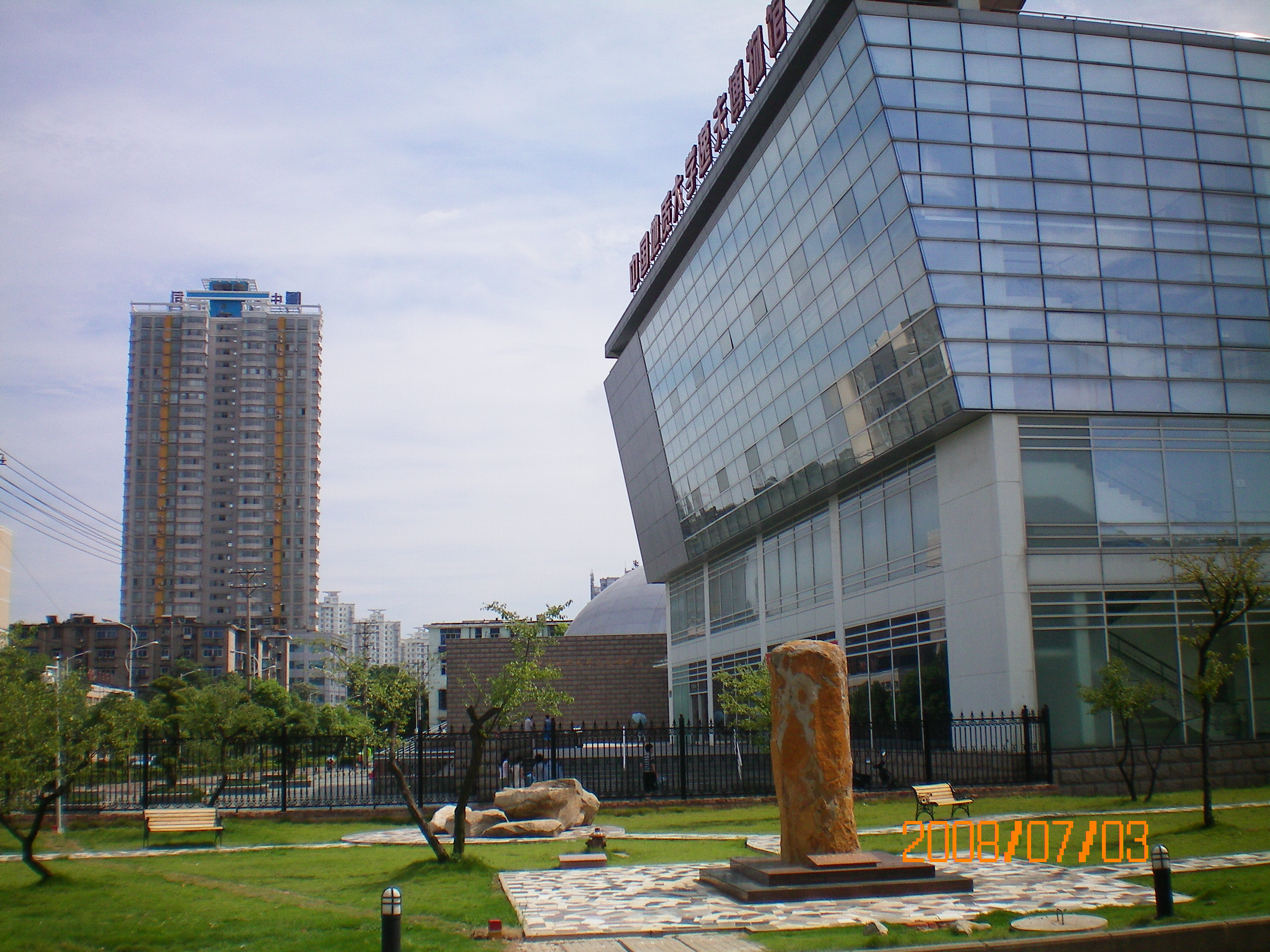

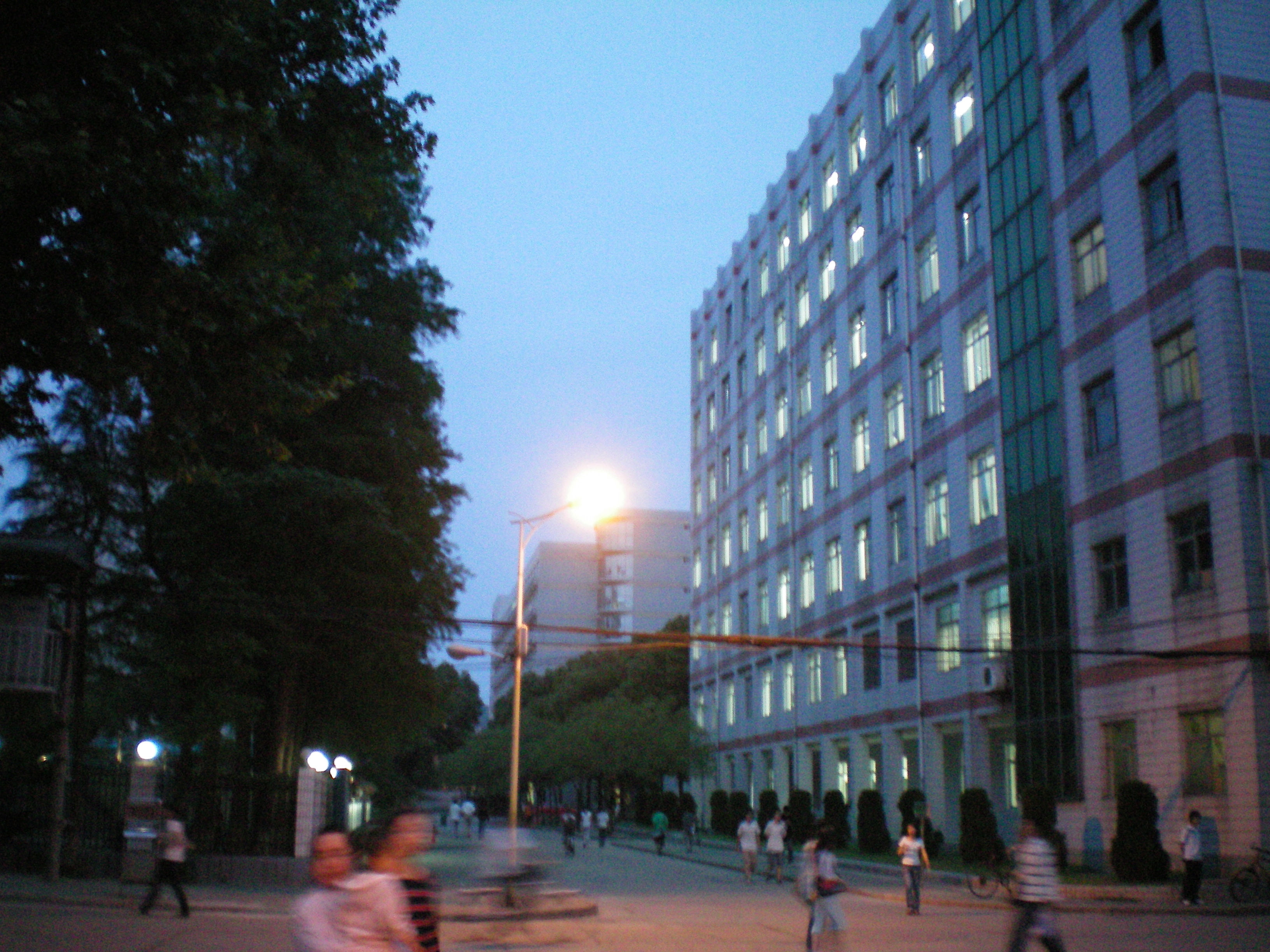

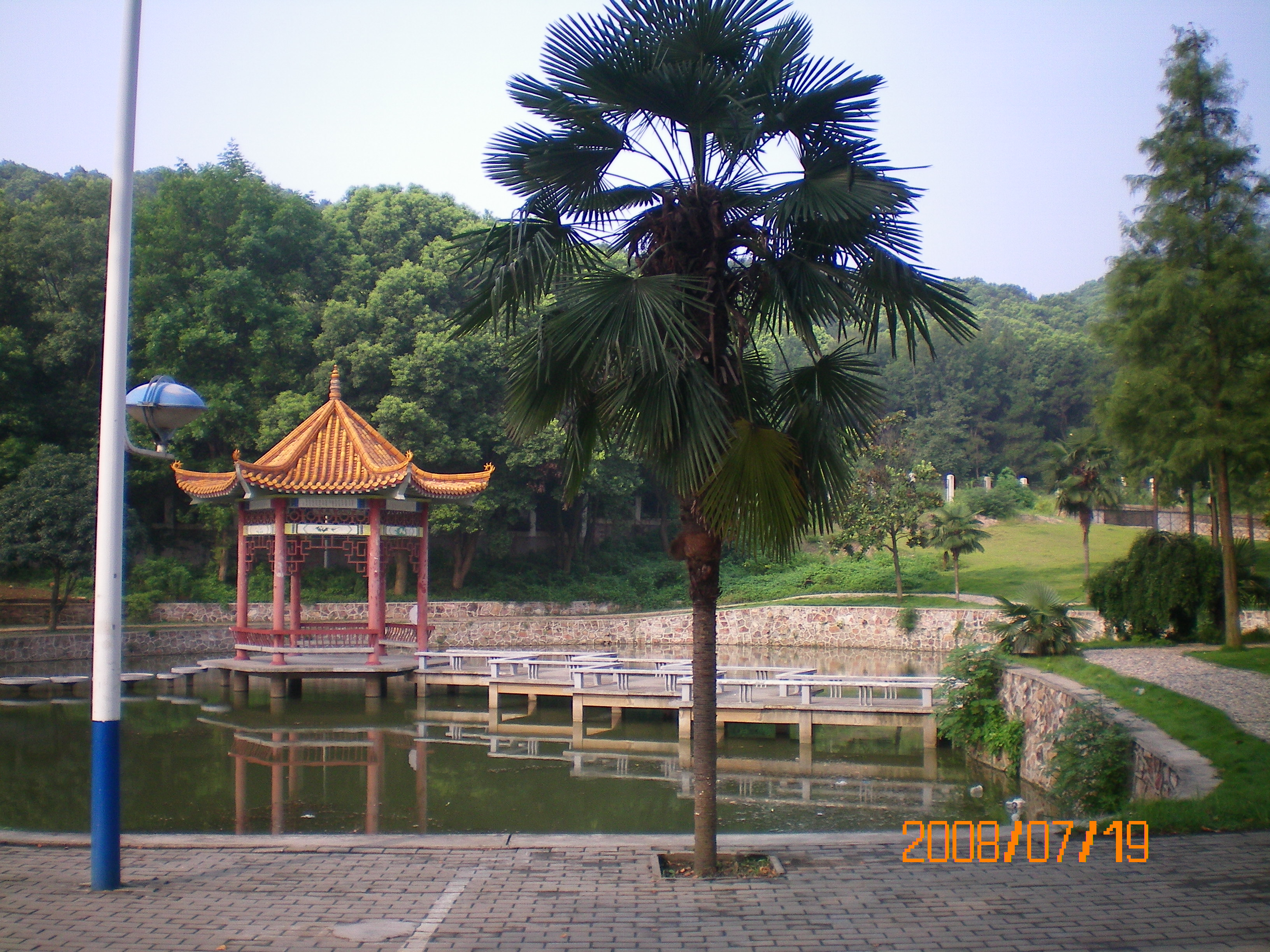

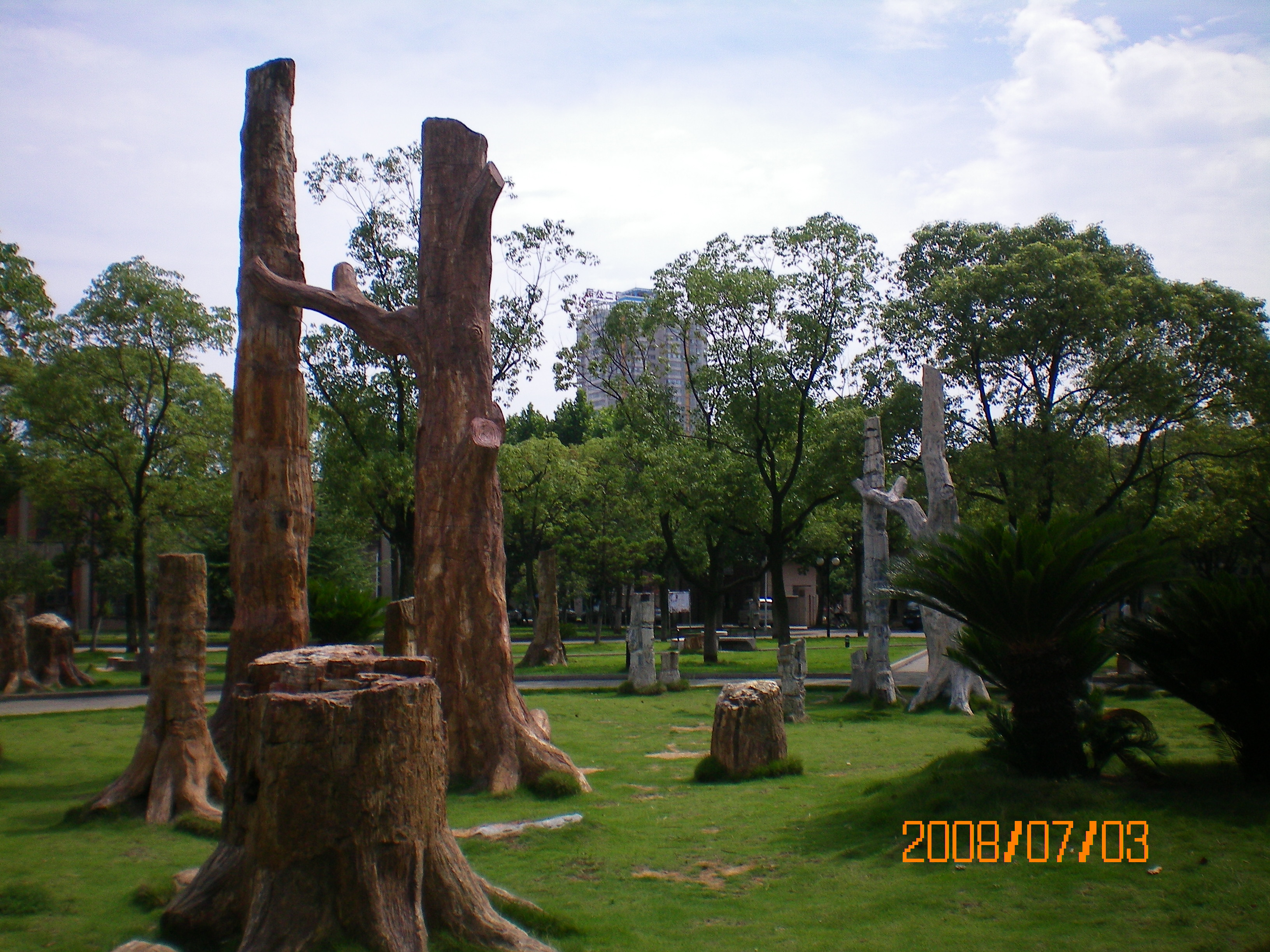

== Notable alumni ==
- Wen Jiabao (graduated 1965, 1968), former premier of China
- Ouyang Ziyuan (graduated 1956), chief scientist of Chinese Lunar Exploration Program
- Zhang Hongren (graduated 1954), former president of International Union of Geological Sciences (IUGS)
- Wang Anshun (graduated 1983), mayor of Beijing (2012–2016)
- Wang Fuzhou (graduated 1958), Chinese mountain climber
- Wang Yongfeng (graduated 1984), Chinese mountain climber
- Li Zhixin (graduated 1985), Chinese mountaineer
- Zhang Wenyue (graduated 1967), governor of Liaoning Province
- Sun Jinlong (graduated 1982, 1986), governor of Anhui Province
- Hua-Wei Zhou (graduated 1980), American geophysicist
- Gao Ling (graduated 2004), badminton player

== See also ==
- Geology of China
- China Geological Survey
- Geological Museum of China
- Project 985
- C9 League
- China Open Resources for Education
- Education in the People's Republic of China
- OpenCourseWare in China
- Worldwide Universities Network
- List of colleges and universities
- List of schools of Journalism and Communication in China
- National Higher Education Entrance Examination
- International Alliance of Research Universities
- Universitas 21
- Workshop on building top-class universities
- Worldwide Universities Network
