= Chang'an University =

Public university in Xi'an, Shaanxi, China

- 长安大学
- Former name: Xi'an Highway University
- Motto: 弘毅明德 笃学创新
- Type: Public
- Established: 1951; 75 years ago
- President: Sha Aimin
- Students: 34,000
- Postgraduates: 10,000
- Location: Xi'an, Shaanxi, China
- Campus: The Main, Yanta, Xiaozhai, Weishui and Taibai
- Website: chd.edu.cn en.chd.edu.cn

Chang'an University (CHD; Chinese: 长安大学; pinyin: Cháng'ān Dàxué) is a public university located in Xi'an, Shaanxi, China. It is affiliated with the Ministry of Education, and co-funded with the Ministry of Transport, the Ministry of Natural Resources, the Ministry of Housing and Urban-Rural Development, and the Shaanxi Provincial People's Government. The university is part of the Double First-Class Construction and Project 211.

On April 18, 2000, Xi'an Highway and Transportation University (西安公路交通大学), Xi'an Engineering College (西安工程学院), and Northwest Architectural Engineering College (西北建筑工程学院) merged to form Chang'an University.

== Overview ==
Chang'an University, directly subordinate to the Ministry of Education, jointly run by the Ministry of Education and the Ministry of Transport, is one of national Double First Class University Plan and former 211 project universities in China. It was established in April 2000 by merging three former universities founded in the 1950s, namely, Xi'an Highway University, Xi'an Engineering Institute and Northwest Institute of Construction Engineering.

The university, covering an area of 199 hectares (490 acres), is located in Xi’an, well known for its cultural history. The university has five campuses (The Main, Yanta, Xiaozhai, Weishui and Taibai) located in Xi'an. The campuses play different roles in fostering students' educational experiences. The Weishui Campus is for undergraduates and the other ones are mainly for postgraduates and social practices. Moreover, Weishui Campus has the only comprehensive automobile proving ground within universities in China.

Chang’an University has three key laboratories of Ministry of Education, 10 Key Laboratories of the Ministry of Transport, Ministry of Land Recourse, Ministry Housing and Urban-Rural Construction and the Key Laboratory of Shaanxi Provincial. C.U also has 6 experimental teaching demonstration centers in Shaanxi Province, two approved Research Centers of the building the Ministry of Education Engineering project, in addition to the only university automobile proving ground.
