= Xi'an University of Science and Technology =

Provincial public university in Xi'an, Shaanxi, China

Coordinates: 34.2345°N 108.96199°E

The Xi'an University of Science and Technology (西安科技大学) is a provincial public university in Xi'an, Shaanxi, China. It is affiliated with the Province of Shaanxi, and co-funded by the Shaanxi Provincial People's Government and the Ministry of Emergency Management.

The earliest predecessor of the school was the Mining and Metallurgy Department of the School of Engineering of Peiyang University (北洋大学工学院采矿冶金科) established in 1895. In 1938, the department became the Department of Mining and Metallurgy of Northwest Polytechnic College (西北工学院矿冶系), and in 1957 it was merged into Xi'an Jiaotong University. In 1958, the Mining Department of Xi'an Jiaotong University was separated and established as an independent Xi'an Mining College (西安矿业学院). In 1998, the school implemented "co-construction by the central and local governments, with local management as the mainstay" and was transferred to Shaanxi Province. The school was renamed Xi'an Science and Technology College (西安科技学院) in 1999 and the Xi'an University of Science and Technology in 2003.

The school has two campuses: one in Beilin and one in Lintong.

== Current status of the Campus ==
At present, Xi'an University of Science and Technology has two campuses. One of them is the old campus, which is located at No. 58, North Section of Yanta Road, Xi'an. The other campus is the newly-built Lintong Campus, which is divided into two campuses, Lishan and Qinhan. The university is now gradually focusing its attention on the new campus. The previous policy was that undergraduate and first-year graduate students attended classes on the new campus. The remaining grades attended the main campus in Xi'an. Starting with the class of 2012, undergraduates will be on the Lintong Campus and graduate students will be on the Yanta Campus. The university covers an area of 1,125,200 square meters and is divided into two campuses, Yanta and Lintong. There are 19 faculties (departments). There are more than 23,000 full-time students enrolled in doctoral and master's degree programs and undergraduate programs. Currently, graduate students attend classes at Yanta Campus and undergraduates at Lintong Campus.
