= Wang Yongfeng =

Chinese mountaineer

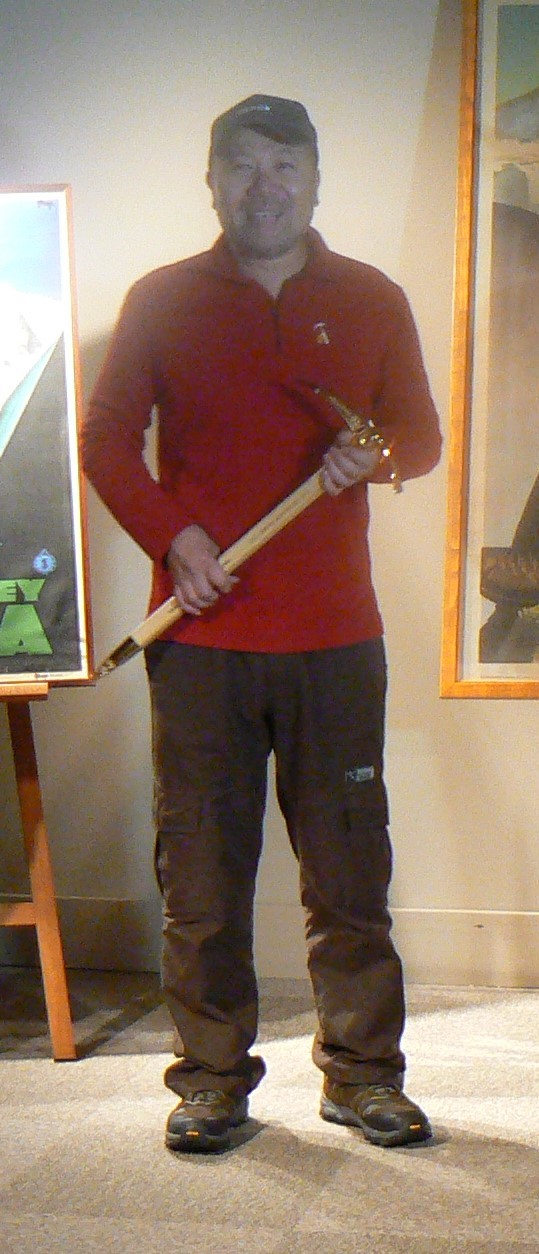
Wang Yongfeng.

Wang Yongfeng (simplified Chinese: 王勇峰, pinyin: Wáng Yŏngfēng) (born 1963) is a Chinese mountaineer and the assistant secretary-general of China mountain climbing association. He is also the captain of the Chinese Mountaineering Team. Wang and his partner, Li Zhixin (李致新), became the first Chinese couple to climb the "Seven Summits" on 23 June 1999.

== Biography ==
Wang Yongfeng was born in Jining District, Inner Mongolia. He entered the Wuhan College of Geology in 1980. Wang and Li Zhixin became friends in this Institute and they were elected to the Wuhan Institute of Geology Mountaineering Team together in 1984. He started his mountaineering career from then on. In 2008, the Beijing Olympic flame was brought to the top of Mt. Qomolangma, and Wang Yongfeng was the head of that mountaineering team as well as the second torchbearer on the peak. In 2013, he led a delegation of Chinese mountaineers on Mount Blanc.
