= 2019 Copa do Brasil Second Stage =

The 2019 Copa do Brasil second stage was the second stage of the 2019 Copa do Brasil football competition. It was played from 19 February to 10 April 2019. A total of 40 teams competed in the second stage to decide 20 places in the third stage of the 2019 Copa do Brasil.

== Format ==
In the second stage, each tie was played on a single match basis. If tied, extra time would not be played and the penalty shoot-out would be used to determine the winner. Host teams were settled in the first-stage draw.

== Matches ==
All times are Brasília time, BRT (UTC−3)

Team 1	Score	Team 2
Corinthians (São Paulo (state))	4–2	(Rio Grande do Sul) Avenida
Foz do Iguaçu (Paraná (state))	0–0 (2–4 p)	Ceará
Bragantino (Pará)	3–2	(Goiás) Aparecidense
URT (Minas Gerais)	2–2 (4–5 p)	(Goiás) Vila Nova
Botafogo (Rio de Janeiro (state))	3–0	(Mato Grosso) Cuiabá
Juventude (Rio Grande do Sul)	2–1	(Minas Gerais) América Mineiro
ABC (Rio Grande do Norte)	2–2 (5–3 p)	(Maranhão) Moto Club
Santa Cruz (Pernambuco)	1–1 (4–2 p)	(Pernambuco) Náutico
Fluminense (Rio de Janeiro (state))	3–0	(Rio Grande do Sul) Ypiranga
Luverdense (Mato Grosso)	1–0	(Santa Catarina (state)) Figueirense
Santa Cruz de Natal (Rio Grande do Norte)	0–1	Bahia
Goiás	1–1 (2–3 p)	(Alagoas) CRB
Santos (São Paulo (state))	4–0	(Rio Grande do Norte) América de Natal
Atlético Cearense (Ceará)	0–4	(Goiás) Atlético Goianiense
Mixto (Mato Grosso)	1–2	(Santa Catarina (state)) Chapecoense
Criciúma (Santa Catarina (state))	0–0 (7–6 p)	(São Paulo (state)) Oeste
Tombense (Minas Gerais)	2–2 (6–7 p)	(Paraíba) Botafogo
Londrina (Paraná (state))	1–1 (5–4 p)	(Paraná (state)) Paraná
Serra (Espírito Santo)	0–2	(Rio de Janeiro (state)) Vasco da Gama
Avaí (Santa Catarina (state))	2–0	(Rio Grande do Sul) Brasil de Pelotas

=== Match 41 ===
20 February 2019
21:30

Corinthians (São Paulo (state))	4–2	(Rio Grande do Sul) Avenida
Henrique 45+1'; Danilo Avelar 76'; Júnior Urso 88'; Gustavo 90+2'	Report	Flávio Torres 4'; Tito 9'

Arena Corinthians, São Paulo
Attendance: 21,120
Referee: Caio Max Augusto Vieira (Rio Grande do Norte)

=== Match 42 ===
27 February 2019
19:15

Foz do Iguaçu (Paraná (state))	0–0	Ceará
	Report
Penalties
Bruno Nascimento (penalty missed); Vinícius Martins (penalty scored); Luiz Matheus (penalty missed); Thomas (penalty scored)	2–4	(penalty scored) Juninho; (penalty missed) Felipe Baxola; (penalty scored) Ricardinho; (penalty scored) Roger; (penalty scored) Samuel Xavier

Estádio do ABC, Foz do Iguaçu
Attendance: 1,833
Referee: Bruno Arleu de Araújo (Rio de Janeiro)

=== Match 43 ===
10 April 2019
19:15

Bragantino (Pará)	3–2	(Goiás) Aparecidense
Luquinha 37'; Marco Goiano 60' (pen.), 85'	Report	Rayro 46', 65'

Estádio Olímpico do Pará, Belém
Attendance: 5,408
Referee: Adriano Milczvski (Paraná)

=== Match 44 ===
27 February 2019
21:30

URT (Minas Gerais)	2–2	(Goiás) Vila Nova
Juninho Potiguar 55'; Cascata 87'	Report	Michel Douglas 20'; Danilo 83'
Penalties
Cascata (penalty scored); Rafael Oller (penalty missed); Djalma Silva (penalty scored); Marcos Vinícius (penalty missed); Reis (penalty missed); Rodney (penalty scored); Gladstone (penalty scored); Derli (penalty missed)	4–5	(penalty scored) Alan Mineiro; (penalty missed) Danilo; (penalty missed) Denner; (penalty missed) Filgueira; (penalty scored) Keké; (penalty scored) Rafael Santos; (penalty scored) Wellington Reis; (penalty scored) Patrick

Estádio Zama Maciel, Patos de Minas
Attendance: 3,623
Referee: Dyorgines José Padovani de Andrade (Espírito Santo)

=== Match 45 ===
27 February 2019
21:30

Botafogo (Rio de Janeiro (state))	3–0	(Mato Grosso) Cuiabá
Erik 45', 81' (pen.); Rodrigo Pimpão 71'	Report

Estádio Olímpico Nilton Santos, Rio de Janeiro
Attendance: 7,218
Referee: André Luiz de Freitas Castro (Goiás)

=== Match 46 ===
28 February 2019
21:30

Juventude (Rio Grande do Sul)	2–1	(Minas Gerais) América Mineiro
Genílson 45+3' (pen.); Breno 46'	Report	Jonatas Belusso 88' (pen.)

Estádio Alfredo Jaconi, Caxias do Sul
Attendance: 3,533
Referee: José Cláudio Rocha Filho (São Paulo)

=== Match 47 ===
7 March 2019
20:30

ABC (Rio Grande do Norte)	2–2	(Maranhão) Moto Club
Maurício 60'; Rodrigo Rodrigues 87'	Report	Márcio Diogo 38', 57'
Penalties
Ivan (penalty scored); Eder (penalty scored); Anderson (penalty scored); Maurício (penalty scored); Rodrigo Rodrigues (penalty scored)	5–3	(penalty missed) Márcio Diogo; (penalty scored) Alisson; (penalty scored) Mateus Mendes; (penalty scored) Juninho Arcanjo

Frasqueirão, Natal
Attendance: 6,141
Referee: Graziani Maciel Rocha (Rio de Janeiro)

=== Match 48 ===
20 February 2019
21:30

Santa Cruz (Pernambuco)	1–1	(Pernambuco) Náutico
Pipico 28'	Report	Jorge Henrique 34'
Penalties
Pipico (penalty scored); Guilherme Queiróz (penalty scored); Luiz Felipe (penalty scored); Marcos Martins (penalty scored)	4–2	(penalty missed) Tharcysio; (penalty scored) Thiago; (penalty scored) Robinho; (penalty missed) Luiz Henrique

Estádio do Arruda, Recife
Attendance: 15,288
Referee: Flávio Rodrigues de Souza (São Paulo)

=== Match 49 ===
6 March 2019
21:30

Fluminense (Rio de Janeiro (state))	3–0	(Rio Grande do Sul) Ypiranga
Everaldo 5'; Luciano 36'; Ganso 56'	Report

Maracanã, Rio de Janeiro
Attendance: 6,051
Referee: Leandro Bizzio Marinho (São Paulo)

=== Match 50 ===
20 February 2019
19:15

Luverdense (Mato Grosso)	1–0	(Santa Catarina (state)) Figueirense
Wilson Júnior 3'	Report

Estádio Passo das Emas, Lucas do Rio Verde
Attendance: 1,565
Referee: Thiago Duarte Peixoto (São Paulo)

=== Match 51 ===
6 March 2019
19:15

Santa Cruz de Natal (Rio Grande do Norte)	0–1	Bahia
	Report	Gilberto 28' (pen.)

Arena das Dunas, Natal
Attendance: 989
Referee: Rodrigo Guarizo Ferreira do Amaral (São Paulo)

=== Match 52 ===
21 February 2019
21:30

Goiás	1–1	(Alagoas) CRB
Renatinho 61' (pen.)	Report	Wellington Carvalho 46'
Penalties
Brenner (penalty scored); Geovane (penalty scored); Marlone (penalty missed); Rafael Vaz (penalty missed); Renatinho (penalty missed)	2–3	(penalty scored) Lucas; (penalty scored) Hugo Sanches; (penalty missed) Mailson; (penalty missed) Wellington Carvalho; (penalty scored) Felipe Menezes

Estádio da Serrinha, Goiânia
Attendance: 7,641
Referee: Vinícius Furlan (São Paulo)

=== Match 53 ===
7 March 2019
21:30

Santos (São Paulo (state))	4–0	(Rio Grande do Norte) América de Natal
González 34'; Jean Mota 60'; Rodrygo 69'; Aguilar 83'	Report

Pacaembu, São Paulo
Attendance: 8,295
Referee: Daniel Nobre Bins (Rio Grande do Sul)

=== Match 54 ===
26 February 2019
21:30

Atlético Cearense (Ceará)	0–4	(Goiás) Atlético Goianiense
	Report	Pedro Raúl 9', 61'; Matheus 30'; Mike 69'

Estádio Presidente Vargas, Fortaleza
Attendance: 232
Referee: Ronei Cândido Alves (Minas Gerais)

=== Match 55 ===
6 March 2019
21:30

Mixto (Mato Grosso)	1–2	(Santa Catarina (state)) Chapecoense
William Amendoim 75'	Report	Perotti 89'; Everaldo 90+1'

Arena Pantanal, Cuiabá
Attendance: 5,051
Referee: Marcelo de Lima Henrique (Rio de Janeiro)

=== Match 56 ===
21 February 2019
19:15

Criciúma (Santa Catarina (state))	0–0	(São Paulo (state)) Oeste
	Report
Penalties
Daniel Costa (penalty scored); Marlon (penalty scored); Sandro (penalty scored); Carlos Eduardo (penalty missed); Reis (penalty scored); Pedro Bortoluzo (penalty scored); Platero (penalty scored); Reinaldo (penalty scored)	7–6	(penalty scored) Jheimy; (penalty scored) Alyson; (penalty scored) Tony; (penalty scored) Mazinho; (penalty missed) Élvis; (penalty scored) Marciel; (penalty scored) Bruno Xavier; (penalty missed) Maracás

Estádio Heriberto Hülse, Criciúma
Attendance: 3,624
Referee: Adriano Milczvski (Paraná)

=== Match 57 ===
28 February 2019
19:15

Tombense (Minas Gerais)	2–2	(Paraíba) Botafogo
Juan 27' (pen.); Edson 68'	Report	Clayton 28', 64'
Penalties
Edson (penalty missed); Juan (penalty scored); Vander (penalty scored); Éverton (penalty scored); Lucas de Sá (penalty scored); Bruno Ferreira (penalty scored); Lincoln Silva (penalty scored); Cássio Ortega (penalty missed)	6–7	(penalty scored) Marcos Aurélio; (penalty scored) Adalgiso Pitbull; (penalty scored) Fábio Alves; (penalty scored) Lula; (penalty missed) Paulo Renê; (penalty scored) Rogério; (penalty scored) Fagner; (penalty scored) Saulo

Estádio Antônio Guimarães de Almeida, Tombos
Attendance: 1,266
Referee: Elmo Alves Resende Cunha (Goiás)

=== Match 58 ===
19 February 2019
19:15

Londrina (Paraná (state))	1–1	(Paraná (state)) Paraná
Luquinha 90+2'	Report	Jenison 32'
Penalties
Germano (penalty scored); Marcelinho (penalty scored); Silvio (penalty missed); Luquinha (penalty scored); Anderson Oliveira (penalty scored); Rômulo (penalty missed); Augusto (penalty scored)	5–4	(penalty scored) Sueliton; (penalty scored) Jenison; (penalty scored) Fernando Neto; (penalty missed) Guilherme Santos; (penalty scored) Éder Sciola; (penalty missed) Jhemerson; (penalty missed) Luiz Otávio

Estádio do Café, Londrina
Attendance: 1,488
Referee: Leandro Vuaden (Rio Grande do Sul)

=== Match 59 ===
20 February 2019
21:30

Serra (Espírito Santo)	0–2	(Rio de Janeiro (state)) Vasco da Gama
	Report	Lucas Mineiro 26'; Ribamar 90+2'

Estádio Kléber Andrade, Cariacica
Attendance: 16,736
Referee: Vinícius Gonçalves Dias Araújo (São Paulo)

=== Match 60 ===
7 March 2019
19:15

Avaí (Santa Catarina (state))	2–0	(Rio Grande do Sul) Brasil de Pelotas
Daniel Amorim 47', 57'	Report

Estádio da Ressacada, Florianópolis
Attendance: 6,281
Referee: Marcelo Aparecido Ribeiro de Souza (Paraíba)
