= 2019 Copa do Brasil First Stage =

The 2019 Copa do Brasil first stage was the first stage of the 2019 Copa do Brasil football competition. It was played from 5 February to 3 April 2019. A total of 80 teams competed in the first stage to decide 40 places in the second stage of the 2019 Copa do Brasil.

== Draw ==
The draw for the first and second stage was held on 13 December 2018, 20:00 at CBF headquarters in Rio de Janeiro. Teams were seeded by their CBF ranking (shown in parentheses). The 80 qualified teams were divided in eight groups (A-H) with 10 teams each. The matches were drawn from the respective confronts: A vs. E; B vs. F; C vs. G; D vs. H. The lower ranked teams hosted the first stage match.

Group A	Group B	Group C	Group D
(São Paulo (state)) Santos (4); (São Paulo (state)) Corinthians (5); (Santa Catarina (state)) Chapecoense (10); (Rio de Janeiro (state)) Botafogo (11); (Rio de Janeiro (state)) Fluminense (13); (Rio de Janeiro (state)) Vasco da Gama (14); Bahia (15); (Pernambuco) Sport (16); (Bahia) Vitória (17); (São Paulo (state)) Ponte Preta (18)	(Minas Gerais) América Mineiro (19); (Paraná (state)) Coritiba (20); (Santa Catarina (state)) Avaí (21); (Santa Catarina (state)) Figueirense (22); Ceará (23); Goiás (24); (Goiás) Atlético Goianiense (25); (Paraná (state)) Paraná (26); (Pernambuco) Santa Cruz (28); (Santa Catarina (state)) Criciúma (29)	(Mato Grosso) Luverdense (30); (Rio Grande do Sul) Juventude (31); (Alagoas) CRB (32); (Goiás) Vila Nova (34); (Paraná (state)) Londrina (35); (Pernambuco) Náutico (36); (São Paulo (state)) Oeste (37); (Santa Catarina (state)) Joinville (39); (Minas Gerais) Boa Esporte (40); (Rio Grande do Sul) Brasil de Pelotas (41)	(Rio Grande do Norte) ABC (43); (São Paulo (state)) Guarani (44); (Alagoas) CSA (45); (Paraíba) Botafogo (46); (Mato Grosso) Cuiabá (47); (Minas Gerais) Tupi (48); (Rio Grande do Norte) América de Natal (49); (Alagoas) ASA (52); (Pará) Remo (54); (Rio Grande do Sul) Ypiranga (55)
Group E	Group F	Group G	Group H
(Minas Gerais) Tombense (56); (Maranhão) Moto Club (65); (Acre (state)) Rio Branco (66); (Bahia) Juazeirense (67); (Paraíba) Campinense (69); (Goiás) Aparecidense (71); (Piauí) River (72); (Ceará) Ferroviário (73); (Piauí) Altos (76); (Rio Grande do Sul) São José (79)	(Minas Gerais) URT (81); (Santa Catarina (state)) Brusque (86); (Sergipe) Itabaiana (87); (Pernambuco) Central (88); (Mato Grosso) Sinop (89); (Rio de Janeiro (state)) Boavista (91); (Pará) São Raimundo (93); Sergipe (94); (Roraima) São Raimundo (96); (Rondônia) Real Ariquemes (107)	(Maranhão) Imperatriz (111); (Federal District (Brazil)) Brasiliense (118); (Santa Catarina (state)) Tubarão (127); (Amazonas (Brazilian state)) Manaus (134); (Mato Grosso do Sul) Corumbaense (140); (Paraná (state)) Foz do Iguaçu (152); (Tocantins) Palmas (158); (Amazonas (Brazilian state)) Fast Clube (159); (Rio de Janeiro (state)) Americano (160); (Ceará) Atlético Cearense (175)	(Acre (state)) Galvez (189); (Mato Grosso) Mixto (218); (São Paulo (state)) Votuporanguense (no rank); (Rio Grande do Sul) Avenida (no rank); (Pará) Bragantino (no rank); (Rio Grande do Norte) Santa Cruz de Natal (no rank); (Federal District (Brazil)) Sobradinho (no rank); (Mato Grosso do Sul) Operário (no rank); (Espírito Santo) Serra (no rank); (Amapá) Ypiranga (no rank)

== Format ==
In the first stage, each tie was played on a single match basis. The lower CBF ranked team hosted the match. If tied, the higher CBF ranked team would advance to second stage.

== Matches ==
All times are Brasília summer time, BRST (UTC−2), except the Aparecidense v Ponte Preta replay, BRT (UTC−3).

Team 1	Score	Team 2
Ferroviário (Ceará)	2–2	(São Paulo (state)) Corinthians
Avenida (Rio Grande do Sul)	1–0	(São Paulo (state)) Guarani
Central (Pernambuco)	1–1	Ceará
Foz do Iguaçu (Paraná (state))	1–0	(Minas Gerais) Boa Esporte
Aparecidense (Goiás)	2–0	(São Paulo (state)) Ponte Preta
Bragantino (Pará)	1–0	(Alagoas) ASA
URT (Minas Gerais)	3–2	(Paraná (state)) Coritiba
Manaus (Amazonas (Brazilian state))	1–1	(Goiás) Vila Nova
Campinense (Paraíba)	0–2	(Rio de Janeiro (state)) Botafogo
Ypiranga (Amapá)	0–1	(Mato Grosso) Cuiabá
São Raimundo (Roraima)	0–0	(Minas Gerais) América Mineiro
Palmas (Tocantins)	0–1	(Rio Grande do Sul) Juventude
Moto Club (Maranhão)	2–0	(Bahia) Vitória
Galvez (Acre (state))	0–1	(Rio Grande do Norte) ABC
Sinop (Mato Grosso)	1–2	(Pernambuco) Santa Cruz
Imperatriz (Maranhão)	1–1	(Pernambuco) Náutico
River (Piauí)	0–5	(Rio de Janeiro (state)) Fluminense
Votuporanguense (São Paulo (state))	0–1	(Rio Grande do Sul) Ypiranga
Boavista (Rio de Janeiro (state))	1–2	(Santa Catarina (state)) Figueirense
Corumbaense (Mato Grosso do Sul)	0–0	(Mato Grosso) Luverdense
Rio Branco (Acre (state))	2–2	Bahia
Santa Cruz de Natal (Rio Grande do Norte)	1–0	(Minas Gerais) Tupi
Sergipe	0–2	Goiás
Brasiliense (Federal District (Brazil))	0–0	(Alagoas) CRB
Altos (Piauí)	1–7	(São Paulo (state)) Santos
Sobradinho (Federal District (Brazil))	0–0	(Rio Grande do Norte) América de Natal
Brusque (Santa Catarina (state))	1–1	(Goiás) Atlético Goianiense
Atlético Cearense (Ceará)	2–0	(Santa Catarina (state)) Joinville
São José (Rio Grande do Sul)	0–0	(Santa Catarina (state)) Chapecoense
Mixto (Mato Grosso)	1–0	(Alagoas) CSA
São Raimundo (Pará)	0–2	(Santa Catarina (state)) Criciúma
Fast Clube (Amazonas (Brazilian state))	1–6	(São Paulo (state)) Oeste
Tombense (Minas Gerais)	3–0	(Pernambuco) Sport
Operário (Mato Grosso do Sul)	1–4	(Paraíba) Botafogo
Itabaiana (Sergipe)	2–5	(Paraná (state)) Paraná
Americano (Rio de Janeiro (state))	1–2	(Paraná (state)) Londrina
Juazeirense (Bahia)	2–2	(Rio de Janeiro (state)) Vasco da Gama
Serra (Espírito Santo)	1–0	(Pará) Remo
Real Ariquemes (Rondônia)	1–4	(Santa Catarina (state)) Avaí
Tubarão (Santa Catarina (state))	0–0	(Rio Grande do Sul) Brasil de Pelotas

Notes

1. On 22 February 2019, the Superior Tribunal de Justiça Desportiva (STJD) annulled the result of the Aparecidense v Ponte Preta match on 12 February 2019 and ordered that it be replayed. STJD determined that match referee Léo Simão Holanda annulled a Ponte Preta's goal with the help of "external interference". Originally Aparecidense had defeated Ponte Preta 1–0.

=== Match 1 ===
7 February 2019
21:00

Ferroviário (Ceará)	2–2	(São Paulo (state)) Corinthians
Edson Cariús 15', 54'	Report	Gustavo 19', 56'

Estádio do Café, Londrina
Attendance: 19,316
Referee: Paulo Roberto Alves Júnior (Paraná)

=== Match 2 ===
13 February 2019
20:30

Avenida (Rio Grande do Sul)	1–0	(São Paulo (state)) Guarani
Flávio Torres 90+1'	Report

Estádio dos Eucaliptos, Santa Cruz do Sul
Attendance: 1,276
Referee: André Luiz de Freitas Castro (Goiás)

=== Match 3 ===
6 February 2019
22:15

Central (Pernambuco)	1–1	Ceará
Bruno Oliveira 44'	Report	Felipe Jonatan 28'

Lacerdão, Caruaru
Attendance: 5,964
Referee: Leandro Bizzio Marinho (São Paulo)

=== Match 4 ===
6 February 2019
20:30

Foz do Iguaçu (Paraná (state))	1–0	(Minas Gerais) Boa Esporte
Douglas 65'	Report

Estádio do ABC, Foz do Iguaçu
Attendance: 218
Referee: Andrey da Silva e Silva (Pará)

=== Match 5 ===
12 February 2019
19:15

Aparecidense (Goiás)	Annulled	(São Paulo (state)) Ponte Preta
Uederson 27'	Report

Estádio Annibal Batista de Toledo, Aparecida de Goiânia
Attendance: 1,387
Referee: Léo Simão Holanda (Ceará)

3 April 2019
19:15

Aparecidense (Goiás)	2–0	(São Paulo (state)) Ponte Preta
Alex Henrique 52'; Washington 72'	Report

Estádio Annibal Batista de Toledo, Aparecida de Goiânia
Attendance: 3,973
Referee: Péricles Bassols Pegado Cortez (Pernambuco)

=== Match 6 ===
13 February 2019
16:30

Bragantino (Pará)	1–0	(Alagoas) ASA
Rafinha 55'	Report

Estádio São Benedito, Bragança
Attendance: 3,628
Referee: Ramon Abatti Abel (Santa Catarina)

=== Match 7 ===
14 February 2019
21:15

URT (Minas Gerais)	3–2	(Paraná (state)) Coritiba
Cascata 11'; Reis 43'; Gladstone 67'	Report	Rodrigão 12'; Iago 58'

Estádio Zama Maciel, Patos de Minas
Attendance: 2,960
Referee: Caio Max Augusto Vieira (Rio Grande do Norte)

=== Match 8 ===
13 February 2019
22:30

Manaus (Amazonas (Brazilian state))	1–1	(Goiás) Vila Nova
Hamilton 5'	Report	Alan Mineiro 55'

Estádio Ismael Benigno, Manaus
Attendance: 1,978
Referee: Marielson Alves Silva (Bahia)

=== Match 9 ===
13 February 2019
21:30

Campinense (Paraíba)	0–2	(Rio de Janeiro (state)) Botafogo
	Report	Rodrigo Pimpão 32'; Alex Santana 53'

Amigão, Campina Grande
Attendance: 2,601
Referee: Rodrigo D'Alonso Ferreira (Santa Catarina)

=== Match 10 ===
13 February 2019
21:30

Ypiranga (Amapá)	0–1	(Mato Grosso) Cuiabá
	Report	Eduardo Ramos 44'

Zerão, Macapá
Attendance: 1,604
Referee: Tiago Nascimento dos Santos (Pernambuco)

=== Match 11 ===
13 February 2019
21:30

São Raimundo (Roraima)	0–0	(Minas Gerais) América Mineiro
	Report

Estádio Roberto Marinho, Boa Vista
Attendance: 0
Referee: Diego Pombo Lopez (Bahia)

=== Match 12 ===
6 February 2019
21:30

Palmas (Tocantins)	0–1	(Rio Grande do Sul) Juventude
	Report	Rodríguez 71'

Estádio Nilton Santos, Palmas
Attendance: 3,522
Referee: Pablo Ramon Gonçalves Pinheiro (Rio Grande do Norte)

=== Match 13 ===
13 February 2019
22:15

Moto Club (Maranhão)	2–0	(Bahia) Vitória
Gleisinho 72'; Juninho Arcanjo 90+2' (pen.)	Report

Castelão, São Luís
Attendance: 2,112
Referee: Eduardo Tomaz de Aquino Valadão (Goiás)

=== Match 14 ===
13 February 2019
20:30

Galvez (Acre (state))	0–1	(Rio Grande do Norte) ABC
	Report	Neto Pessoa 75' (pen.)

Arena da Floresta, Rio Branco
Attendance: 1,377
Referee: Rafael Martins Diniz (Distrito Federal)

=== Match 15 ===
14 February 2019
22:30

Sinop (Mato Grosso)	1–2	(Pernambuco) Santa Cruz
Igor Peninha 89'	Report	Elias 5'; Pipico 73' (pen.)

Estádio Municipal Gigante do Norte, Sinop
Attendance: 1,989
Referee: Adriano Milczvski (Paraná)

=== Match 16 ===
12 February 2019
21:30

Imperatriz (Maranhão)	1–1	(Pernambuco) Náutico
Daniel Barros 90+2' (pen.)	Report	André Krobel 45+1'

Estádio Frei Epifânio D'Abadia, Imperatriz
Attendance: 6,522
Referee: Ivan da Silva Guimarães Júnior (Amazonas)

=== Match 17 ===
5 February 2019
21:30

River (Piauí)	0–5	(Rio de Janeiro (state)) Fluminense
	Report	Luciano 15' (pen.), 56'; Everaldo 18'; Bruno Silva 44'; Marlon 90+1'

Albertão, Teresina
Attendance: 4,657
Referee: Emerson de Almeida Ferreira (Minas Gerais)

=== Match 18 ===
6 February 2019
16:00

Votuporanguense (São Paulo (state))	0–1	(Rio Grande do Sul) Ypiranga
	Report	Pedro Pires 58'

Arena Plínio Marin, Votuporanga
Attendance: 1,266
Referee: Alinor Silva da Paixão (Mato Grosso)

=== Match 19 ===
13 February 2019
20:30

Boavista (Rio de Janeiro (state))	1–2	(Santa Catarina (state)) Figueirense
Renan Donizete 67' (pen.)	Report	Kauê 35'; Alípio 63' (pen.)

Estádio Elcyr Resende de Mendonça, Saquarema
Attendance: 430
Referee: Elmo Alves Resende Cunha (Goiás)

=== Match 20 ===
6 February 2019
21:30

Corumbaense (Mato Grosso do Sul)	0–0	(Mato Grosso) Luverdense
	Report

Estádio Arthur Marinho, Corumbá
Attendance: 3,493
Referee: Dyorgines José Padovani de Andrade (Espírito Santo)

=== Match 21 ===
13 February 2019
23:30

Rio Branco (Acre (state))	2–2	Bahia
Laécio 14'; Custódio 90'	Report	Gilberto 9', 70'

Arena da Floresta, Rio Branco
Attendance: 1,377
Referee: Daniel Nobre Bins (Rio Grande do Sul)

=== Match 22 ===
6 February 2019
21:00

Santa Cruz de Natal (Rio Grande do Norte)	1–0	(Minas Gerais) Tupi
Dênis 24'	Report

Arena das Dunas, Natal
Attendance: 286
Referee: Alisson Sidnei Furtado (Tocantins)

=== Match 23 ===
13 February 2019
20:30

Sergipe	0–2	Goiás
	Report	Jefferson 68'; Renatinho 75'

Batistão, Aracaju
Attendance: 2,828
Referee: Leandro Vuaden (Rio Grande do Sul)

=== Match 24 ===
13 February 2019
16:30

Brasiliense (Federal District (Brazil))	0–0	(Alagoas) CRB
	Report

Serejão, Taguatinga
Attendance: 992
Referee: Jean Pierre Gonçalves Lima (Rio Grande do Sul)

=== Match 25 ===
6 February 2019
19:15

Altos (Piauí)	1–7	(São Paulo (state)) Santos
Luizão 6'	Report	Luiz Felipe 10'; González 24'; Alison 26'; Sánchez 29', 40'; Soteldo 73'; Diego Pituca 83'

Albertão, Teresina
Attendance: 4,407
Referee: Jean Pierre Gonçalves Lima (Rio Grande do Sul)

=== Match 26 ===
6 February 2019
20:30

Sobradinho (Federal District (Brazil))	0–0	(Rio Grande do Norte) América de Natal
	Report

Estádio Augustinho Lima, Sobradinho
Attendance: 1,289
Referee: Marcelo Aparecido Ribeiro de Souza (Paraíba)

=== Match 27 ===
13 February 2019
20:30

Brusque (Santa Catarina (state))	1–1	(Goiás) Atlético Goianiense
Hélio Paraíba 45+1'	Report	André Luís 68'

Estádio Augusto Bauer, Brusque
Attendance: 1,872
Referee: José Mendonça da Silva Júnior (Paraná)

=== Match 28 ===
6 February 2019
21:30

Atlético Cearense (Ceará)	2–0	(Santa Catarina (state)) Joinville
Dudu Itapajé 36' (pen.), 68'	Report

Estádio Presidente Vargas, Fortaleza
Attendance: 253
Referee: Marcos Mateus Pereira (Mato Grosso do Sul)

=== Match 29 ===
13 February 2019
19:00

São José (Rio Grande do Sul)	0–0	(Santa Catarina (state)) Chapecoense
	Report

Estádio Passo d'Areia, Porto Alegre
Attendance: 740
Referee: Paulo Roberto Alves Júnior (Paraná)

=== Match 30 ===
6 February 2019
21:30

Mixto (Mato Grosso)	1–0	(Alagoas) CSA
William Amendoim 47'	Report

Arena Pantanal, Cuiabá
Attendance: 1,920
Referee: Rodrigo Carvalhães de Miranda (Rio de Janeiro)

=== Match 31 ===
13 February 2019
20:00

São Raimundo (Pará)	0–2	(Santa Catarina (state)) Criciúma
	Report	Daniel Costa 19' (pen.); Julimar 60'

Estádio Colosso do Tapajós, Santarém
Attendance: 2,447
Referee: Leonardo Ferreira Lima (Paraná)

=== Match 32 ===
14 February 2019
22:30

Fast Clube (Amazonas (Brazilian state))	1–6	(São Paulo (state)) Oeste
Robinho 83'	Report	Alyson 20'; Bruno Lopes 21'; Élvis 48'; Jheimy 81', 88'; Bruno Xavier 87' (pen.)

Estádio Ismael Benigno, Manaus
Attendance: 318
Referee: Christiano Gayo Nascimento (Distrito Federal)

=== Match 33 ===
13 February 2019
21:30

Tombense (Minas Gerais)	3–0	(Pernambuco) Sport
Juan 31'; Denilson 71'; Marquinhos 90+4'	Report

Estádio Antônio Guimarães de Almeida, Tombos
Attendance: 764
Referee: Jefferson Ferreira de Moraes (Goiás)

=== Match 34 ===
13 February 2019
21:30

Operário (Mato Grosso do Sul)	1–4	(Paraíba) Botafogo
Alberto 33' (pen.)	Report	Dico 21'; Nando 64', 75'; Marcos Aurélio 66'

Morenão, Campo Grande
Attendance: 3,145
Referee: Sávio Pereira Sampaio (Distrito Federal)

=== Match 35 ===
6 February 2019
21:30

Itabaiana (Sergipe)	2–5	(Paraná (state)) Paraná
Louback 48' (pen.); Rodolfo 65' (o.g.)	Report	Alesson 8'; Jenison 29', 70'; Higor Leite 32' (pen.); Itaqui 82'

Batistão, Aracaju
Attendance: 740
Referee: Eduardo Tomaz de Aquino Valadão (Goiás)

=== Match 36 ===
7 February 2019
18:30

Americano (Rio de Janeiro (state))	1–2	(Paraná (state)) Londrina
Flamel 11' (pen.)	Report	Marcelinho 3'; Anderson Oliveira 69'

Estádio Elcyr Resende de Mendonça, Saquarema
Attendance: 297
Referee: Sávio Pereira Sampaio (Distrito Federal)

=== Match 37 ===
6 February 2019
21:30

Juazeirense (Bahia)	2–2	(Rio de Janeiro (state)) Vasco da Gama
Gustavo Balotelli 50'; Nino Guerreiro 77' (pen.)	Report	Yan Sasse 12'; López 90' (pen.)

Estádio Adauto Moraes, Juazeiro
Attendance: 3,682
Referee: Rafael Traci (Paraná)

=== Match 38 ===
13 February 2019
20:30

Serra (Espírito Santo)	1–0	(Pará) Remo
Rael 51'	Report

Robertão, Serra
Attendance: 1,484
Referee: André Rodrigo Rocha (Tocantins)

=== Match 39 ===
13 February 2019
20:30

Real Ariquemes (Rondônia)	1–4	(Santa Catarina (state)) Avaí
Leandro Augusto 18'	Report	Daniel Amorim 15' (pen.), 25'; Pedro Castro 57'; Getúlio 79'

Estádio Gentil Valério, Ariquemes
Attendance: 2,015
Referee: Rafael Traci (Paraná)

=== Match 40 ===
14 February 2019
19:00

Tubarão (Santa Catarina (state))	0–0	(Rio Grande do Sul) Brasil de Pelotas
	Report

Estádio Domingos Silveira Gonzales, Tubarão
Attendance: 1,718
Referee: Marcos Mateus Pereira (Mato Grosso do Sul)
