= 2012 Clube Náutico Capibaribe season =

Náutico
2012 season
- Chairman: Paulo Wanderley
- Manager: Waldemar Lemos; Alexandre Gallo
- Stadium: Estádio dos Aflitos
- Série A: 12th
- Pernambucano: Semi-finals
- Copa do Brasil: Second round
- Top goalscorer: League: Kieza (13); All: Souza (14)
Home colours	Away colours	Third colours

The 2012 season was Náutico's 112th season in the club's history. Náutico competed in the Campeonato Pernambucano, Copa do Brasil and Série A.

== Squad ==
Note: Flags indicate national team as defined under FIFA eligibility rules; some limited exceptions apply. Players may hold more than one non-FIFA nationality.

No.	Pos.	Nation	Player
—	GK	BRA	Gideão
—	GK	BRA	Rodrigo Carvalho
—	GK	BRA	Felipe
—	DF	BRA	Alessandro
—	DF	BRA	Marlon
—	DF	BRA	Ronaldo Alves
—	DF	BRA	Jean Rolt
—	DF	BRA	Auremir
—	DF	BRA	Gustavo
—	DF	BRA	Márcio Rozário
—	DF	BRA	João Paulo
—	DF	BRA	João Ananias
—	MF	VEN	Breitner
—	MF	BRA	Souza
—	MF	BRA	Lúcio

No.	Pos.	Nation	Player
—	MF	BRA	Martinez
—	MF	BRA	Glaydson
—	MF	BRA	Elicarlos
—	MF	BRA	Derley
—	MF	BRA	Douglas
—	MF	ARG	Andrés Romero
—	MF	BRA	Cascata
—	MF	BRA	Cleverson
—	FW	BRA	Rogério
—	FW	BRA	Piauí
—	FW	BRA	Rhayner
—	FW	BRA	Kim
—	FW	BRA	Kieza
—	FW	BRA	Araújo

== Statistics ==
=== Overall ===
Games played	65 (24 Pernambucano, 3 Copa do Brasil, 38 Série A)
Games won	27 (11 Pernambucano, 2 Copa do Brasil, 14 Série A)
Games drawn	13 (6 Pernambucano, 0 Copa do Brasil, 7 Série A)
Games lost	25 (7 Pernambucano, 1 Copa do Brasil, 17 Série A)
Goals scored	84
Goals conceded	80
Goal difference	+4
Best results (goal difference)	3–0 (H) v Araripina – Pernambucano – 2012.03.03; 3–0 (H) v Ponte Preta – Série A – 2012.07.18; 3–0 (H) v Santos – Série A – 2012.08.05; 3–0 (H) v São Paulo – Série A – 2012.08.15; 3–0 (H) v Internacional – Série A – 2012.11.04
Worst result (goal difference)	1–5 (A) v Atlético Mineiro – Série A – 2012.06.23
Top scorer	Souza (14)

Source: Náutico official website

=== Goalscorers ===
Place	Position	Nationality	Number	Name	Campeonato Pernambucano	Copa do Brasil	Série A	Total
1	MF	(Brazil)	8	Souza	7	0	7	14
2	FW	(Brazil)	9	Kieza	0	0	13	13
3	FW	(Brazil)	10	Araújo	0	0	8	8
3	FW	(Brazil)		Siloé	8	0	0	8
4	MF	(Brazil)		Derley	3	1	1	5
5	MF	(Brazil)	50	Elicarlos	0	0	3	3
5	DF	(Brazil)		Marlon	2	1	0	3
5	DF	(Brazil)		Ronaldo Alves	2	0	1	3
6	MF	(Brazil)		Cascata	2	0	0	2
6	FW	(Brazil)		Dori	2	0	0	2
6	DF	(Brazil)		Douglas Santos	1	0	1	2
6	FW	(Brazil)	17	Kim	0	0	2	2
6	MF	(Brazil)		Lenon	2	0	0	2
6	MF	(Brazil)	7	Martinez	0	0	2	2
7	DF	(Brazil)		Cesinha	0	1	0	1
7	FW	(Brazil)	16	Dimba	0	0	1	1
7	MF	(Brazil)		Eduardo Ramos	1	0	0	1
7	DF	(Brazil)		Gustavo Henrique	1	0	0	1
7	DF	(Brazil)		Jefferson	1	0	0	1
7	FW	(Brazil)		Léo Santos	0	1	0	1
7	DF	(Brazil)		Lúcio	0	0	1	1
7	MF	(Brazil)		Marcos Vinícius	1	0	0	1
7	DF	(Brazil)		Patric	0	0	1	1
7	FW	(Brazil)		Rico	0	0	1	1
7	FW	(Brazil)		Rodrigo Tiuí	1	0	0	1
7	FW	(Brazil)	21	Rogério	1	0	0	1
				Own goals	0	1	2	3
				Total	35	5	44	84

== Competitions ==
=== Campeonato Pernambucano ===
==== First stage ====
15 January 2012 1	Porto	0–2	Náutico	Caruaru
16:00 (UTC-3)		Report	Ronaldo Alves; Souza	Stadium: Estádio Luiz José de Lacerda (Lacerdão)

18 January 2012 2	Náutico	2–0	Petrolina	Recife
21:00 (UTC-3)	Souza (pen.); Cascata	Report		Stadium: Estádio Eládio de Barros Carvalho (Aflitos); Attendance: 13,452

21 January 2012 3	Araripina	0–1	Náutico	Araripina
18:00 (UTC-3)		Report	Rogério 29'	Stadium: Estádio Gilson Tiburtino de Souza (Chapadão do Araripe)

25 January 2012 4	Náutico	2–0	América–PE	Recife
21:10 (UTC-3)	Marlon; Siloé	Report		Stadium: Estádio Eládio de Barros Carvalho (Aflitos); Attendance: 11,481; Referee: Cláudio Mercante

29 January 2012 5	Sport	4–3	Náutico	Recife
16:00 (UTC-3)	Roberson 6', 13'; Willian Rocha 12'; Tobi 60'	Report	Souza 27'; Jefferson 74'; Lenon 85'	Stadium: Estádio Adelmar da Costa Carvalho (Ilha do Retiro); Attendance: 24,617; Referee: Gleydson Leite

1 February 2012 6	Náutico	3–1	Ypiranga–PE	Recife
21:00 (UTC-3)	Souza 11'; Derley 13', 31'	Report	Ludemar	Stadium: Estádio Eládio de Barros Carvalho (Aflitos)

4 February 2012 7	Náutico	2–2	Santa Cruz	Recife
18:00 (UTC-3)	Cascata 60'; Souza 90+4'		Flávio Caça-Rato 11'; Elicarlos 60' (o.g.)	Stadium: Estádio Eládio de Barros Carvalho (Aflitos); Attendance: 15,075; Referee: Emerson Sobral

8 February 2012 8	Salgueiro	3–2	Náutico	Salgueiro
21:10 (UTC-3)	Fabrício Ceará; Rafael Alemão; Dori (o.g.)	Report	Siloé 20',	Stadium: Estádio Cornélio de Barros

12 February 2012 9	Serra Talhada	0–1	Náutico	Serra Talhada
16:00 (UTC-3)		Report	Marcos Vinícius	Stadium: Estádio Nildo Pereira de Menezes

15 February 2012 10	Náutico	2–0	Central	Recife
21:10 (UTC-3)	Siloé 60', 83'	Report		Stadium: Estádio Eládio de Barros Carvalho (Aflitos)

22 February 2012 11	Belo Jardim	2–0	Náutico	Belo Jardim
21:10 (UTC-3)	Tiago Santos 23'; Alenílson 53'			Stadium: Estádio José Bezerra de Mendonça

26 February 2012 12	Náutico	3–1	Belo Jardim	Recife
16:00 (UTC-3)	Derley; Douglas Santos 34'; Siloé 73'	Report	Fernandinho 40' (pen.)	Stadium: Estádio Eládio de Barros Carvalho (Aflitos)

29 February 2012 13	América–PE	2–2	Náutico	Paulista
20:00 (UTC-3)	Ricardo Mineiro 62'; David Queiroz 71'		Souza 55', 70'	Stadium: Estádio Ademir Cunha; Attendance: 5,253; Referee: Gilberto Freire de Farias

3 March 2012 14	Náutico	3–0	Araripina	Recife
19:00 (UTC-3)	Siloé 7'; Gustavo Henrique 44'; Dori 59'			Stadium: Estádio Eládio de Barros Carvalho (Aflitos); Referee: Neilson Santos

7 March 2012 15	Náutico	2–0	Porto	Recife
20:00 (UTC-3)	Dori 65'; Siloé 66'			Stadium: Estádio Eládio de Barros Carvalho (Aflitos); Attendance: 9,418; Referee: Gleydson Leite

11 March 2012 16	Petrolina	1–1	Náutico	Petrolina
16:00 (UTC-3)	Lau 33'		Eduardo Ramos 64'	Stadium: Estádio Paulo de Souza Coelho

18 March 2012 17	Ypiranga–PE	0–0	Náutico	Santa Cruz do Capibaribe
16:00 (UTC-3)				Stadium: Estádio Otávio Limeira Alves; Referee: Carlos Costa

25 March 2012 18	Náutico	0–0	Sport	Recife
16:00 (UTC-3)		Report		Stadium: Estádio Eládio de Barros Carvalho (Aflitos); Attendance: 17,559; Referee: Sandro Meira Ricci

28 March 2012 19	Náutico	0–1	Salgueiro	Recife
20:00 (UTC-3)			Vítor Caicó 36'	Stadium: Estádio Eládio de Barros Carvalho (Aflitos); Referee: Neilson Santos

1 April 2012 20	Santa Cruz	1–0	Náutico	Recife
16:00 (UTC-3)	Renatinho 64'			Stadium: Estádio José do Rego Maciel (Arruda); Attendance: 27,078; Referee: Sebastião Rufino Filho

7 April 2012 21	Náutico	1–2	Serra Talhada	Recife
19:00 (UTC-3)	Marlon 73'		Stanley 9'; Jessuí 36'	Stadium: Estádio Eládio de Barros Carvalho (Aflitos); Attendance: 6,005; Referee: Sandro Meira Ricci

15 April 2012 22	Central	1–2	Náutico	Caruaru
16:00 (UTC-3)	Thiago Silva 37'		Lenon 6'; Rodrigo Tiuí 7'	Stadium: Estádio Luiz José de Lacerda (Lacerdão); Attendance: 1,349; Referee: Enéias Ferreira Leite de Oliveira

==== Semi-finals ====
22 April 2012	Náutico	1–2	Sport	Recife
16:00 (UTC-3)	Ronaldo Alves 31'	Report	Marcelinho Paraíba 23', 81' (pen.)	Stadium: Estádio Eládio de Barros Carvalho (Aflitos); Attendance: 12,644; Referee: Ricardo Tavares

29 April 2012	Sport	0–0	Náutico	Recife
16:00 (UTC-3)		Report		Stadium: Estádio Adelmar da Costa Carvalho (Ilha do Retiro); Attendance: 19,026; Referee: Sandro Meira Ricci

==== Record ====
Final Position	Points	Matches	Wins	Draws	Losses	Goals For	Goals Away	Avg%
4th	39	24	11	6	7	35	23	54%

=== Copa do Brasil ===
==== First round ====
15 March 2012	Santa Cruz–RN	1–3	Náutico	Santa Cruz
22:00 (UTC-3)	Binho 54'	Report	Cesinha 15'; Danilo 61' (o.g.); Derley 89'	Stadium: Estádio Iberê Ferreira de Souza (Iberêzão); Attendance: 1,045; Referee: João Bosco Satiro da Nóbreg

==== Second round ====
12 April 2012	Fortaleza	4–0	Náutico	Fortaleza
20:30 (UTC-3)	Rafinha 17'; Jaílson 18'; Geraldo 69' (pen.); Cléo 75'	Report		Stadium: Estádio Presidente Vargas; Attendance: 17,887; Referee: Elmo Alves Resende

18 April 2012	Náutico	2–1	Fortaleza	Recife
21:50 (UTC-3)	Marlon 46'; Léo Santos 80'	Report	Jaílson 29'	Stadium: Estádio Eládio de Barros Carvalho (Aflitos); Attendance: 2,308; Referee: Péricles Bassols

==== Record ====
Final Position	Points	Matches	Wins	Draws	Losses	Goals For	Goals Away	Avg%
21st	6	3	2	0	1	5	6	66%

=== Série A ===
19 May 2012 1	Figueirense	2–1	Náutico	Florianópolis
21:00 (UTC-3)	Fernandes 75'; Caio 90+4'	Report	Araújo 79' (pen.)	Stadium: Estádio Orlando Scarpelli; Attendance: 5,185; Referee: Arilson Bispo da Anunciação

26 May 2012 2	Náutico	0–0	Cruzeiro	Recife
21:00 (UTC-3)		Report		Stadium: Estádio Eládio de Barros Carvalho (Aflitos); Attendance: 12,531; Referee: Luiz Flávio de Oliveira

6 June 2012 3	Vasco da Gama	4–2	Náutico	Rio de Janeiro
20:30 (UTC-3)	Alecsandro 23', 69'; Felipe 36'; Juninho 62'	Report	Martinez 67'; Araújo 89'	Stadium: Estádio Vasco da Gama (São Januário); Attendance: 7,541; Referee: Wilson Seneme

10 June 2012 4	Náutico	3–2	Botafogo	Recife
18:30 (UTC-3)	Araújo 16'; Lúcio 32'; Derley 82'	Report	Márcio Azevedo 47'; Fábio Ferreira 59'	Stadium: Estádio Eládio de Barros Carvalho (Aflitos); Attendance: 3,268; Referee: Heber Roberto Lopes

17 June 2012 5	Náutico	1–0	Grêmio	Recife
18:30 (UTC-3)	Ronaldo Alves 90+1'	Report		Stadium: Estádio Eládio de Barros Carvalho (Aflitos); Attendance: 12,767; Referee: Manoel Nunes Garrido

23 June 2012 6	Atlético Mineiro	5–1	Náutico	Belo Horizonte
21:00 (UTC-3)	Bernard 2'; Ronaldinho 35' (pen.); Márcio Rozário 36' (o.g.); Danilinho 61'; Escudero 90+1'	Report	Araújo 12'	Stadium: Estádio Raimundo Sampaio (Independência); Attendance: 16,367; Referee: Raphael Claus

30 June 2012 7	Náutico	0–2	Fluminense	Recife
16:20 (UTC-3)		Report	Samuel 30', 71'	Stadium: Estádio Eládio de Barros Carvalho (Aflitos); Attendance: 12,801; Referee: Evandro Roman

7 July 2012 8	Atlético Goianiense	0–1	Náutico	Goiânia
21:00 (UTC-3)		Report	Araújo 22'	Stadium: Estádio do Governo do Estado de Goiás (Serra Dourada); Attendance: 2,048; Referee: Ricardo Marques Ribeiro

14 July 2012 9	Corinthians	2–1	Náutico	São Paulo
19:30 (UTC-3)	Danilo 22', 50'	Report	Elicarlos 20'	Stadium: Estádio Municipal Paulo Machado de Carvalho (Pacaembu); Attendance: 25,656; Referee: Wagner Reway

18 July 2012 10	Náutico	3–0	Ponte Preta	Recife
20:30 (UTC-3)	Kieza 36', 87'; Souza 60'	Report		Stadium: Estádio Eládio de Barros Carvalho (Aflitos); Attendance: 11,443; Referee: Marcelo de Lima Henrique

22 July 2012 11	Palmeiras	3–0	Náutico	Barueri
16:00 (UTC-3)	Obina 18'; Mazinho 29'; Márcio Araújo 50'	Report		Stadium: Arena Barueri; Attendance: 7,407; Referee: Edivaldo Elias da Silva

25 July 2012 12	Náutico	3–4	Coritiba	Recife
20:30 (UTC-3)	Souza 13'; Kieza 18'; Rico 85'	Report	Robinho 15'; Leonardo 46', 55' (pen.); Pereira 67'	Stadium: Estádio Eládio de Barros Carvalho (Aflitos); Attendance: 11,453; Referee: Cláudio F Lima e Silva

29 July 2012 13	Portuguesa	3–1	Náutico	São Paulo
18:30 (UTC-3)	Moisés 30'; Ananias 57'; Diego Viana 86'	Report	Kieza 8'	Stadium: Estádio Oswaldo Teixeira Duarte (Canindé); Attendance: 1,910; Referee: Marcelo de Lima Henrique

5 August 2012 14	Náutico	3–0	Santos	Recife
18:30 (UTC-3)	Patric 58'; Kieza 90+1'; Kim 80'	Report		Stadium: Estádio Eládio de Barros Carvalho (Aflitos); Attendance: 11,086; Referee: Wilton Pereira Sampaio

8 August 2012 15	Internacional	0–0	Náutico	Porto Alegre
19:30 (UTC-3)		Report		Stadium: Estádio José Pinheiro Borda (Beira-Rio); Attendance: 9,716; Referee: Ricardo Marques Ribeiro

11 August 2012 16	Flamengo	2–0	Náutico	Volta Redonda
21:00 (UTC-3)	Vágner Love 14', 44'	Report		Stadium: Estádio Raulino de Oliveira; Attendance: 7,073; Referee: Jean Pierre Gonçalves Lima

15 August 2012 17	Náutico	3–0	São Paulo	Recife
21:50 (UTC-3)	Kieza 12' (pen.); Araújo 28'; Rogério Ceni 61' (o.g.)	Report		Stadium: Estádio Eládio de Barros Carvalho (Aflitos); Attendance: 14,022; Referee: José de Caldas Souza

18 August 2012 18	Náutico	1–0	Bahia	Recife
18:30 (UTC-3)	Martinez 87'	Report		Stadium: Estádio Eládio de Barros Carvalho (Aflitos); Attendance: 12,558; Referee: Ricardo Marques Ribeiro

26 August 2012 19	Sport	0–0	Náutico	Recife
18:30 (UTC-3)		Report		Stadium: Estádio Adelmar da Costa Carvalho (Ilha do Retiro); Attendance: 17,066; Referee: Sandro Meira Ricci

28 August 2012 20	Náutico	3–2	Figueirense	Recife
20:30 (UTC-3)	Elicarlos 58', 64'; Souza 75'	Report	Caio 10'; Aloísio 19'	Stadium: Estádio Eládio de Barros Carvalho (Aflitos); Attendance: 10,880; Referee: Wagner Reway

2 September 2012 21	Cruzeiro	3–0	Náutico	Belo Horizonte
18:30 (UTC-3)	Borges 74'; Élber 86'; Wellington Paulista 90'	Report		Stadium: Estádio Raimundo Sampaio (Independência); Attendance: 11,673; Referee: Elmo Alves Resende

5 September 2012 22	Náutico	1–1	Vasco da Gama	Recife
19:30 (UTC-3)	Kieza 42'	Report	Fellipe Bastos 53'	Stadium: Estádio Eládio de Barros Carvalho (Aflitos); Attendance: 13,041; Referee: Leandro Vuaden

9 September 2012 23	Botafogo	3–1	Náutico	Rio de Janeiro
16:00 (UTC-3)	Elkeson 1', 33'; Andrezinho 90+1'	Report	Araújo 54' (pen.)	Stadium: Estádio Olímpico João Havelange (Engenhão); Attendance: 14,612; Referee: Jaílson Macedo Freitas

13 September 2012 24	Grêmio	2–0	Náutico	Porto Alegre
21:00 (UTC-3)	Marco Antônio 60'; Kléber 90+2'	Report		Stadium: Estádio Olímpico Monumental; Attendance: 17,932; Referee: Heber Roberto Lopes

16 September 2012 25	Náutico	1–0	Atlético Mineiro	Recife
16:00 (UTC-3)	Souza 48'	Report		Stadium: Estádio Eládio de Barros Carvalho (Aflitos); Attendance: 13,337; Referee: Flávio Rodrigues de Souza

22 September 2012 26	Fluminense	2–1	Náutico	Volta Redonda
18:30 (UTC-3)	Leandro Euzébio 41'; Fred 45'	Report	Kim 81'	Stadium: Estádio Raulino de Oliveira; Attendance: 6,132; Referee: Pablo dos Santos Alves

29 September 2012 27	Náutico	2–0	Atlético Goianiense	Recife
18:30 (UTC-3)	Kieza 18' (pen.), 40'	Report		Stadium: Estádio Eládio de Barros Carvalho (Aflitos); Attendance: 11,884; Referee: Leandro Vuaden

6 October 2012 28	Náutico	2–1	Corinthians	Recife
16:20 (UTC-3)	Kieza 30'; Ralf 84' (o.g.)	Report	Guerrero 44'	Stadium: Estádio Eládio de Barros Carvalho (Aflitos); Attendance: 17,130; Referee: Héber Roberto Lopes

10 October 2012 29	Ponte Preta	2–1	Náutico	Campinas
19:30 (UTC-3)	Rildo 74'; Marcinho 77' (pen.)	Report	Douglas Santos 4'	Stadium: Estádio Moisés Lucarelli; Attendance: 6,856; Referee: Paulo Henrique de Godoy

14 October 2012 30	Náutico	1–0	Palmeiras	Recife
16:00 (UTC-3)	Kieza 13'	Report		Stadium: Estádio Eládio de Barros Carvalho (Aflitos); Attendance: 15,096; Referee: Marcelo de Lima Henrique

17 October 2012 31	Coritiba	2–1	Náutico	Curitiba
19:30 (UTC-3)	Rafael Alemão 1' (o.g.); Deivid 37'	Report	Kieza 88'	Stadium: Estádio Major Antônio *Couto Pereira); Attendance: 12,174; Referee: Ricardo Marques Ribeiro

21 October 2012 32	Náutico	0–0	Portuguesa	Recife
16:00 (UTC-3)		Report		Stadium: Estádio Eládio de Barros Carvalho (Aflitos); Attendance: 13,199; Referee: Elmo Alves Resende

25 October 2012 33	Santos	0–0	Náutico	Santos
21:00 (UTC-3)		Report		Stadium: Estádio Urbano Caldeira (Vila Belmiro); Attendance: 6,256; Referee: Fabrício Neves Corrêa

4 November 2012 34	Náutico	3–0	Internacional	Recife
19:30 (UTC-3)	Souza 22', 32'; Kieza 61'	Report		Stadium: Estádio Eládio de Barros Carvalho (Aflitos); Attendance: 15,439; Referee: Wilton Pereira Sampaio

11 November 2012 35	Náutico	0–1	Flamengo	Recife
19:30 (UTC-3)		Report	Renato 82' (pen.)	Stadium: Estádio Eládio de Barros Carvalho (Aflitos); Attendance: 19,252; Referee: Guilherme Cereta de Lima

18 November 2012 36	São Paulo	2–1	Náutico	São Paulo
17:00 (UTC-3)	Luís Fabiano 54'; Rogério Ceni 70' (pen.)	Report	Souza 48'	Stadium: Estádio Cícero Pompeu de Toledo (Morumbi); Attendance: 62,207; Referee: Wagner Reway

25 November 2012 37	Bahia	1–1	Náutico	Salvador
17:00 (UTC-3)	Gabriel 51' (pen.)	Report	Dimba 78'	Stadium: Estádio Governador Roberto Santos (Pituaçu); Attendance: 32,157; Referee: Péricles Bassols Cortez

2 December 2012 38	Náutico	1–0	Sport	Recife
17:00 (UTC-3)	Araújo 64'	Report		Stadium: Estádio Eládio de Barros Carvalho (Aflitos); Referee: Marcelo de Lima Henrique

==== Record ====
Final Position	Points	Matches	Wins	Draws	Losses	Goals For	Goals Away	Avg%
12th	49	38	14	7	17	44	51	43%
