= 2019 Copa do Brasil Third Stage =

Football competition

The 2019 Copa do Brasil third stage was the third stage of the 2019 Copa do Brasil football competition. It was played from 13 March to 20 April 2019. A total of 20 teams competed in the third stage to decide ten places in the fourth stage of the 2019 Copa do Brasil.

== Format ==
In the third stage, each tie was played on a home-and-away two-legged basis. If tied on aggregate, the away goals rule would not be used, extra time would not be played and the penalty shoot-out would be used to determine the winner. Host teams were settled in a draw held on 8 March 2019, 11:00 at CBF headquarters in Rio de Janeiro.

== Matches ==
All times are Brasília time, BRT (UTC−3)

| Team 1 | Agg. | Team 2 | 1st leg | 2nd leg |
|---|---|---|---|---|
| Ceará | 2–3 | (São Paulo (state)) Corinthians | 1–3 | 1–0 |
| Vila Nova (Goiás) | 3–2 | (Pará) Bragantino | 2–0 | 1–2 |
| Botafogo (Rio de Janeiro (state)) | 2–3 | (Rio Grande do Sul) Juventude | 1–1 | 1–2 |
| ABC (Rio Grande do Norte) | 1–3 | (Pernambuco) Santa Cruz | 1–0 | 0–3 |
| Luverdense (Mato Grosso) | 0–2 | (Rio de Janeiro (state)) Fluminense | 0–0 | 0–2 |
| CRB (Alagoas) | 1–2 | Bahia | 1–1 | 0–1 |
| Atlético Goianiense (Goiás) | 1–3 | (São Paulo (state)) Santos | 1–0 | 0–3 |
| Chapecoense (Santa Catarina (state)) | 5–2 | (Santa Catarina (state)) Criciúma | 3–2 | 2–0 |
| Botafogo (Paraíba) | 3–5 | (Paraná (state)) Londrina | 0–2 | 3–3 |
| Vasco da Gama (Rio de Janeiro (state)) | 4–2 | (Santa Catarina (state)) Avaí | 3–2 | 1–0 |

=== Match 61 ===
13 March 2019
21:30

| Ceará | 1–3 | (São Paulo (state)) Corinthians |
|---|---|---|
| Juninho 22' (pen.) | Report | Júnior Urso 9'; Vágner Love 64'; Jádson 71' |

Castelão, Fortaleza
Attendance: 26,199
Referee: Leandro Vuaden (Rio Grande do Sul)

3 April 2019
21:30

| Corinthians (São Paulo (state)) | 0–1 | Ceará |
|---|---|---|
| | Report | Roger 88' |

Arena Corinthians, São Paulo
Attendance: 34,639
Referee: Rafael Traci (Santa Catarina)

Corinthians won 3–2 on aggregate and advanced to the fourth round.

=== Match 62 ===
16 April 2019
20:00

| Vila Nova (Goiás) | 2–0 | (Pará) Bragantino |
|---|---|---|
| Danilo 7' (pen.); Rafael Silva 70' (pen.) | Report |

Estádio Olímpico Pedro Ludovico, Goiânia
Attendance: 9,231
Referee: Caio Max Augusto Vieira (Rio Grande do Norte)

20 April 2019
16:00

| Bragantino (Pará) | 2–1 | (Goiás) Vila Nova |
|---|---|---|
| Marco Goiano 39'; Paulo de Tárcio 78' | Report | Boné 1' |

Estádio Olímpico do Pará, Belém
Attendance: 6,905
Referee: Marcelo Aparecido Ribeiro de Souza (Paraíba)

Vila Nova won 3–2 on aggregate and advanced to the fourth round.

=== Match 63 ===
4 April 2019
21:30

| Botafogo (Rio de Janeiro (state)) | 1–1 | (Rio Grande do Sul) Juventude |
|---|---|---|
| Erik 50' (pen.) | Report | Paulo Sérgio 19' |

Estádio Olímpico Nilton Santos, Rio de Janeiro
Attendance: 21,839
Referee: Flávio Rodrigues de Souza (São Paulo)

11 April 2019
19:15

| Juventude (Rio Grande do Sul) | 2–1 | (Rio de Janeiro (state)) Botafogo |
|---|---|---|
| Rodríguez 60'; Dalberto 89' | Report | Cícero 33' |

Estádio Alfredo Jaconi, Caxias do Sul
Attendance: 12,479
Referee: Vinícius Furlan (São Paulo)

Juventude won 3–2 on aggregate and advanced to the fourth round.

=== Match 64 ===
3 April 2019
21:30

| ABC (Rio Grande do Norte) | 1–0 | (Pernambuco) Santa Cruz |
|---|---|---|
| Rodrigo Rodrigues 80' | Report |

Frasqueirão, Natal
Attendance: 1,931
Referee: Bruno Arleu de Araújo (Rio de Janeiro)

10 April 2019
21:30

| Santa Cruz (Pernambuco) | 3–0 | (Rio Grande do Norte) ABC |
|---|---|---|
| Pipico 40', 48' (pen.); Charles 45+2' | Report |

Estádio do Arruda, Recife
Attendance: 16,580
Referee: Igor Junio Benevenuto (Minas Gerais)

Santa Cruz won 3–1 on aggregate and advanced to the fourth round.

=== Match 65 ===
3 April 2019
19:15

| Luverdense (Mato Grosso) | 0–0 | (Rio de Janeiro (state)) Fluminense |
|---|---|---|
| | Report |

Estádio Passo das Emas, Lucas do Rio Verde
Attendance: 2,367
Referee: Caio Max Augusto Vieira (Rio Grande do Norte)

10 April 2019
19:15

| Fluminense (Rio de Janeiro (state)) | 2–0 | (Mato Grosso) Luverdense |
|---|---|---|
| González 48'; Luciano 82' | Report |

Maracanã, Rio de Janeiro
Attendance: 6,386
Referee: Rodrigo D'Alonso Ferreira (Santa Catarina)

Fluminense won 2–0 on aggregate and advanced to the fourth round.

=== Match 66 ===
2 April 2019
19:15

| CRB (Alagoas) | 1–1 | Bahia |
|---|---|---|
| Zé Carlos 21' (pen.) | Report | Arthur Caíke 77' |

Estádio Rei Pelé, Maceió
Attendance: 6,026
Referee: Marcelo de Lima Henrique (Rio de Janeiro)

9 April 2019
19:15

| Bahia | 1–0 | (Alagoas) CRB |
|---|---|---|
| Elton 90+8' | Report |

Arena Fonte Nova, Salvador
Attendance: 18,272
Referee: Eduardo Tomaz de Aquino Valadão (Goiás)

Bahia won 2–1 on aggregate and advanced to the fourth round.

=== Match 67 ===
4 April 2019
19:15

| Atlético Goianiense (Goiás) | 1–0 | (São Paulo (state)) Santos |
|---|---|---|
| Jorginho 82' | Report |

Estádio Antônio Accioly, Goiânia
Attendance: 10,525
Referee: Paulo Roberto Alves Júnior (Paraná)

11 April 2019
21:30

| Santos (São Paulo (state)) | 3–0 | (Goiás) Atlético Goianiense |
|---|---|---|
| Sánchez 44', 84'; Rodrygo 46' | Report |

Estádio Urbano Caldeira, Santos
Attendance: 11,623
Referee: Rodrigo Carvalhães de Miranda (Rio de Janeiro)

Santos won 3–1 on aggregate and advanced to the fourth round.

=== Match 68 ===
27 March 2019
19:15

| Chapecoense (Santa Catarina (state)) | 3–2 | (Santa Catarina (state)) Criciúma |
|---|---|---|
| Elicarlos 26'; Gustavo Campanharo 38'; Lourency 89' | Report | Sandro 65'; Bruno Cosendey 68' |

Arena Condá, Chapecó
Attendance: 6,059
Referee: Daniel Nobre Bins (Rio Grande do Sul)

10 April 2019
19:15

| Criciúma (Santa Catarina (state)) | 0–2 | (Santa Catarina (state)) Chapecoense |
|---|---|---|
| | Report | Victor Andrade 45'; Rildo 77' |

Estádio Heriberto Hülse, Criciúma
Attendance: 11,338
Referee: Leandro Vuaden (Rio Grande do Sul)

Chapecoense won 5–2 on aggregate and advanced to the fourth round.

=== Match 69 ===
13 March 2019
19:15

| Botafogo (Paraíba) | 0–2 | (Paraná (state)) Londrina |
|---|---|---|
| | Report | Marcelinho 48'; Felipe 86' |

Almeidão, João Pessoa
Attendance: 12,269
Referee: Igor Junio Benevenuto (Minas Gerais)

3 April 2019
20:30

| Londrina (Paraná (state)) | 3–3 | (Paraíba) Botafogo |
|---|---|---|
| Augusto 26', 54'; Luquinha 80' | Report | Nando 40', 87'; Clayton 70' |

Estádio do Café, Londrina
Attendance: 1,835
Referee: André Luiz de Freitas Castro (Goiás)

Londrina won 5–3 on aggregate and advanced to the fourth round.

=== Match 70 ===
14 March 2019
21:30

| Vasco da Gama (Rio de Janeiro (state)) | 3–2 | (Santa Catarina (state)) Avaí |
|---|---|---|
| Danilo Barcelos 34'; Rossi 57'; Thiago Galhardo 71' | Report | Pedro Castro 11'; André Moritz 84' |

Estádio São Januário, Rio de Janeiro
Attendance: 13,360
Referee: Flávio Rodrigues de Souza (São Paulo)

10 April 2019
21:30

| Avaí (Santa Catarina (state)) | 0–1 | (Rio de Janeiro (state)) Vasco da Gama |
|---|---|---|
| | Report | Yago Pikachu 70' |

Estádio da Ressacada, Florianópolis
Attendance: 15,225
Referee: Jean Pierre Gonçalves Lima (Rio Grande do Sul)

Vasco da Gama won 4–2 on aggregate and advanced to the fourth round.
