= 2019 Copa do Brasil =

Tournament details
- Country: Brazil
- Dates: 5 February – 18 September
- Teams: 91

Final positions
- Champions: Athletico Paranaense (1st title)
- Runners-up: Internacional
- 2020 Copa Libertadores: Athletico Paranaense

Tournament statistics
- Matches played: 120
- Goals scored: 270 (2.25 per match)
- Top goal scorer(s): Paolo Guerrero; Luciano; Pipico (5 goals each)

Awards
- Best player: Paolo Guerrero (Internacional)

The 2019 Copa do Brasil (officially the Copa Continental Pneus do Brasil 2019 for sponsorship reasons) was the 31st edition of the Copa do Brasil football competition. It was held between 5 February and 18 September 2019. The competition was contested by 91 teams, either qualified through participating in their respective state championships (70), by the 2019 CBF ranking (10), by the 2018 Copa do Nordeste (1), by the 2018 Copa Verde (1), by the 2018 Série B (1) or those qualified for 2019 Copa Libertadores (8).

Athletico Paranaense defeated Internacional 3–1 on aggregate in the finals to win their first title. As champions, Athletico Paranaense qualified for the 2020 Supercopa do Brasil, the 2020 Copa Libertadores group stage and the 2020 Copa do Brasil Round of 16.

Cruzeiro were the defending champions, but lost in the semifinals 0–4 on aggregate to Internacional.

Paolo Guerrero (Internacional) and Fábio (Cruzeiro) won best player and best goalkeeper awards, respectively.

== Format ==
The competition was a single elimination knockout tournament, the first two stages featuring a single match and the other stages featuring two-legged ties. Eleven teams qualified for the Round of 16 (Teams qualified for 2019 Copa Libertadores (8), Série B champions, Copa Verde champions and Copa do Nordeste champions). The remaining 80 teams played the first stage. The 40 winners played the second stage, the 20 winners played the third stage, the 10 winners played the fourth stage. Finally, the five fourth-stage winners qualified for the Round of 16.

== Qualified teams ==
Teams in bold are qualified directly for the round of 16.

Association	Team	Qualification method
(Acre (state)) Acre; 2 berths	Rio Branco	2018 Campeonato Acriano champions
(Acre (state)) Acre; 2 berths	Galvez	2018 Campeonato Acriano runners-up
(Alagoas) Alagoas; 3 berths	CSA	2018 Campeonato Alagoano champions
(Alagoas) Alagoas; 3 berths	CRB	2018 Campeonato Alagoano runners-up
(Alagoas) Alagoas; 3 berths	ASA	2018 Campeonato Alagoano 3rd place
(Amapá) Amapá; 1 berth	Ypiranga	2018 Campeonato Amapaense champions
(Amazonas (Brazilian state)) Amazonas; 2 berths	Manaus	2018 Campeonato Amazonense champions
(Amazonas (Brazilian state)) Amazonas; 2 berths	Fast Clube	2018 Campeonato Amazonense runners-up
(Bahia) Bahia; 3 berths	Bahia	2018 Campeonato Baiano champions
(Bahia) Bahia; 3 berths	Vitória	2018 Campeonato Baiano runners-up
(Bahia) Bahia; 3 berths	Juazeirense	2018 Campeonato Baiano 3rd place
(Ceará) Ceará; 3 + 1 berths	**Fortaleza**	**2018 Campeonato Brasileiro Série B champions**
(Ceará) Ceará; 3 + 1 berths	Ceará	2018 Campeonato Cearense champions
(Ceará) Ceará; 3 + 1 berths	Atlético Cearense^{[a]}	2018 Campeonato Cearense 3rd place
(Ceará) Ceará; 3 + 1 berths	Ferroviário	2018 Copa Fares Lopes champions
(Espírito Santo) Espírito Santo; 1 berth	Serra	2018 Campeonato Capixaba champions
(Federal District (Brazil)) Federal District; 2 berths	Sobradinho	2018 Campeonato Brasiliense champions
(Federal District (Brazil)) Federal District; 2 berths	Brasiliense	2018 Campeonato Brasiliense runners-up
(Goiás) Goiás; 3 + 1 berths	Goiás	2018 Campeonato Goiano champions
(Goiás) Goiás; 3 + 1 berths	Aparecidense	2018 Campeonato Goiano runners-up
(Goiás) Goiás; 3 + 1 berths	Vila Nova	2018 Campeonato Goiano 3rd place
(Goiás) Goiás; 3 + 1 berths	Atlético Goianiense	2nd best placed team in the 2018 CBF ranking not already qualified
(Maranhão) Maranhão; 2 + 1 berths	**Sampaio Corrêa**	**2018 Copa do Nordeste champions**
(Maranhão) Maranhão; 2 + 1 berths	Moto Club	2018 Campeonato Maranhense champions
(Maranhão) Maranhão; 2 + 1 berths	Imperatriz	2018 Campeonato Maranhense runners-up
(Mato Grosso) Mato Grosso; 3 + 1 berths	Cuiabá	2018 Campeonato Mato-Grossense champions
(Mato Grosso) Mato Grosso; 3 + 1 berths	Sinop	2018 Campeonato Mato-Grossense runners-up
(Mato Grosso) Mato Grosso; 3 + 1 berths	Mixto	2018 Copa FMF champions
(Mato Grosso) Mato Grosso; 3 + 1 berths	Luverdense	5th best placed team in the 2018 CBF ranking not already qualified
Mato Grosso do Sul 2 berths	Operário	2018 Campeonato Sul-Mato-Grossense champions
Mato Grosso do Sul 2 berths	Corumbaense	2018 Campeonato Sul-Mato-Grossense runners-up
(Minas Gerais) Minas Gerais; 4 + 2 + 1 berths	**Cruzeiro**	**2018 Copa do Brasil champions**
(Minas Gerais) Minas Gerais; 4 + 2 + 1 berths	**Atlético Mineiro**	**2018 Campeonato Brasileiro Série A 6th place**
(Minas Gerais) Minas Gerais; 4 + 2 + 1 berths	América Mineiro	2018 Campeonato Mineiro 3rd place
(Minas Gerais) Minas Gerais; 4 + 2 + 1 berths	Tupi	2018 Campeonato Mineiro 4th place
(Minas Gerais) Minas Gerais; 4 + 2 + 1 berths	Tombense	2018 Campeonato Mineiro 5th place
(Minas Gerais) Minas Gerais; 4 + 2 + 1 berths	URT	2018 Campeonato Mineiro 6th place
(Minas Gerais) Minas Gerais; 4 + 2 + 1 berths	Boa Esporte	10th best placed team in the 2018 CBF ranking not already qualified
(Pará) Pará; 3 + 1 berths	**Paysandu**	**2018 Copa Verde champions**
(Pará) Pará; 3 + 1 berths	Remo	2018 Campeonato Paraense champions
(Pará) Pará; 3 + 1 berths	Bragantino	2018 Campeonato Paraense 3rd place
(Pará) Pará; 3 + 1 berths	São Raimundo	2018 Campeonato Paraense 4th place
(Paraíba) Paraíba; 2 berths	Botafogo	2018 Campeonato Paraibano champions
(Paraíba) Paraíba; 2 berths	Campinense	2018 Campeonato Paraibano runners-up
(Paraná (state)) Paraná; 3 + 1 + 1 berths	**Athletico Paranaense**	**2018 Copa Sudamericana champions**
(Paraná (state)) Paraná; 3 + 1 + 1 berths	Coritiba	2018 Campeonato Paranaense runners-up
(Paraná (state)) Paraná; 3 + 1 + 1 berths	Foz do Iguaçu	2018 Campeonato Paranaense 3rd place
(Paraná (state)) Paraná; 3 + 1 + 1 berths	Paraná	2018 Campeonato Paranaense 4th place
(Paraná (state)) Paraná; 3 + 1 + 1 berths	Londrina	7th best placed team in the 2018 CBF ranking not already qualified
(Pernambuco) Pernambuco; 3 + 1 berths	Náutico	2018 Campeonato Pernambucano champions
(Pernambuco) Pernambuco; 3 + 1 berths	Central	2018 Campeonato Pernambucano runners-up
(Pernambuco) Pernambuco; 3 + 1 berths	Sport	2018 Campeonato Pernambucano 3rd place
(Pernambuco) Pernambuco; 3 + 1 berths	Santa Cruz	3rd best placed team in the 2018 CBF ranking not already qualified
(Piauí) Piauí; 2 berths	Altos	2018 Campeonato Piauiense champions
(Piauí) Piauí; 2 berths	Ríver	2018 Campeonato Piauiense runners-up
(Rio de Janeiro (state)) Rio de Janeiro; 5 + 1 berths	**Flamengo**	**2018 Campeonato Brasileiro Série A runners-up**
(Rio de Janeiro (state)) Rio de Janeiro; 5 + 1 berths	Botafogo	2018 Campeonato Carioca champions
(Rio de Janeiro (state)) Rio de Janeiro; 5 + 1 berths	Vasco da Gama	2018 Campeonato Carioca runners-up
(Rio de Janeiro (state)) Rio de Janeiro; 5 + 1 berths	Fluminense	2018 Campeonato Carioca 4th place
(Rio de Janeiro (state)) Rio de Janeiro; 5 + 1 berths	Boavista	2018 Campeonato Carioca 5th place
(Rio de Janeiro (state)) Rio de Janeiro; 5 + 1 berths	Americano	2018 Copa Rio champions
Rio Grande do Norte 3 berths	ABC	2018 Campeonato Potiguar champions
Rio Grande do Norte 3 berths	América de Natal	2018 Campeonato Potiguar runners-up
Rio Grande do Norte 3 berths	Santa Cruz de Natal	2018 Campeonato Potiguar 3rd place
(Rio Grande do Sul) Rio Grande do Sul; 4 + 2 + 1 berths	**Internacional**	**2018 Campeonato Brasileiro Série A 3rd place**
(Rio Grande do Sul) Rio Grande do Sul; 4 + 2 + 1 berths	**Grêmio**	**2018 Campeonato Brasileiro Série A 4th place**
(Rio Grande do Sul) Rio Grande do Sul; 4 + 2 + 1 berths	Brasil de Pelotas	2018 Campeonato Gaúcho runners-up
(Rio Grande do Sul) Rio Grande do Sul; 4 + 2 + 1 berths	São José	2018 Campeonato Gaúcho 3rd place
(Rio Grande do Sul) Rio Grande do Sul; 4 + 2 + 1 berths	Avenida	2018 Campeonato Gaúcho 4th place
(Rio Grande do Sul) Rio Grande do Sul; 4 + 2 + 1 berths	Ypiranga	2018 Copa FGF 3rd place
(Rio Grande do Sul) Rio Grande do Sul; 4 + 2 + 1 berths	Juventude	6th best placed team in the 2018 CBF ranking not already qualified
(Rondônia) Rondônia; 1 berth	Real Ariquemes	2018 Campeonato Rondoniense champions
(Roraima) Roraima; 1 berth	São Raimundo	2018 Campeonato Roraimense champions
(Santa Catarina (state)) Santa Catarina; 4 + 3 berths	Figueirense	2018 Campeonato Catarinense champions
(Santa Catarina (state)) Santa Catarina; 4 + 3 berths	Chapecoense	2018 Campeonato Catarinense runners-up
(Santa Catarina (state)) Santa Catarina; 4 + 3 berths	Tubarão	2018 Campeonato Catarinense 3rd place
(Santa Catarina (state)) Santa Catarina; 4 + 3 berths	Brusque	2018 Copa Santa Catarina champions
(Santa Catarina (state)) Santa Catarina; 4 + 3 berths	Avaí	best placed team in the 2018 CBF ranking not already qualified
(Santa Catarina (state)) Santa Catarina; 4 + 3 berths	Criciúma	4th best placed team in the 2018 CBF ranking not already qualified
(Santa Catarina (state)) Santa Catarina; 4 + 3 berths	Joinville	9th best placed team in the 2018 CBF ranking not already qualified
(São Paulo (state)) São Paulo; 5 + 2 + 1 berths	**Palmeiras**	**2018 Campeonato Brasileiro Série A champions**
(São Paulo (state)) São Paulo; 5 + 2 + 1 berths	**São Paulo**	**2018 Campeonato Brasileiro Série A 5th place**
(São Paulo (state)) São Paulo; 5 + 2 + 1 berths	Corinthians	2018 Campeonato Paulista champions
(São Paulo (state)) São Paulo; 5 + 2 + 1 berths	Santos	2018 Campeonato Paulista 4th place
(São Paulo (state)) São Paulo; 5 + 2 + 1 berths	Ponte Preta	2018 Campeonato Paulista do Interior champions
(São Paulo (state)) São Paulo; 5 + 2 + 1 berths	Guarani	2018 Campeonato Paulista Série A2 champions
(São Paulo (state)) São Paulo; 5 + 2 + 1 berths	Votuporanguense	2018 Copa Paulista champions
(São Paulo (state)) São Paulo; 5 + 2 + 1 berths	Oeste	8th best placed team in the 2018 CBF ranking not already qualified
(Sergipe) Sergipe; 2 berths	Sergipe	2018 Campeonato Sergipano champions
(Sergipe) Sergipe; 2 berths	Itabaiana	2018 Campeonato Sergipano runners-up
(Tocantins) Tocantins; 1 berth	Palmas	2018 Campeonato Tocantinense champions

^{a} Uniclinic Atlético Clube was renamed to Futebol Clube Atlético Cearense on 21 September 2018.

== Schedule ==
The schedule of the competition was as follows.

Stage	First leg	Second leg
First stage	Week 1: 6 February 2019; Week 2: 13 February 2019; Replay: 3 April 2019	
Second stage	Week 1: 20 February 2019; Week 2: 27 February 2019; Week 3: 6 March 2019; Postponed: 10 April 2019	
Third stage	Week 1: 13 March 2019; Week 2: 27 March 2019; Week 3: 3 April 2019; Week 4: 16 April 2019	Week 1: 3 April 2019; Week 2: 10 April 2019; Week 3: 20 April 2019
Fourth stage	17 April 2019	24 April 2019
Round of 16	15, 22 and 29 May 2019	22 and 29 May and 5 June 2019
Quarterfinals	10 July 2019	17 July 2019
Semifinals	7 and 14 August 2019	4 September 2019
Finals	11 September 2019	18 September 2019

== Draw ==
The draw for the first and second stage was held on 13 December 2018, 20:00 at CBF headquarters in Rio de Janeiro. Teams were seeded by their CBF ranking (shown in parentheses). The 80 qualified teams were divided in eight groups (A-H) with 10 teams each. The matches were drawn from the respective confronts: A vs. E; B vs. F; C vs. G; D vs. H. The lower ranked teams hosted the first stage match.

Group A	Group B	Group C	Group D
(São Paulo (state)) Santos (4); (São Paulo (state)) Corinthians (5); (Santa Catarina (state)) Chapecoense (10); (Rio de Janeiro (state)) Botafogo (11); (Rio de Janeiro (state)) Fluminense (13); (Rio de Janeiro (state)) Vasco da Gama (14); Bahia (15); (Pernambuco) Sport (16); (Bahia) Vitória (17); (São Paulo (state)) Ponte Preta (18)	(Minas Gerais) América Mineiro (19); (Paraná (state)) Coritiba (20); (Santa Catarina (state)) Avaí (21); (Santa Catarina (state)) Figueirense (22); Ceará (23); Goiás (24); (Goiás) Atlético Goianiense (25); (Paraná (state)) Paraná (26); (Pernambuco) Santa Cruz (28); (Santa Catarina (state)) Criciúma (29)	(Mato Grosso) Luverdense (30); (Rio Grande do Sul) Juventude (31); (Alagoas) CRB (32); (Goiás) Vila Nova (34); (Paraná (state)) Londrina (35); (Pernambuco) Náutico (36); (São Paulo (state)) Oeste (37); (Santa Catarina (state)) Joinville (39); (Minas Gerais) Boa Esporte (40); (Rio Grande do Sul) Brasil de Pelotas (41)	(Rio Grande do Norte) ABC (43); (São Paulo (state)) Guarani (44); (Alagoas) CSA (45); (Paraíba) Botafogo (46); (Mato Grosso) Cuiabá (47); (Minas Gerais) Tupi (48); (Rio Grande do Norte) América de Natal (49); (Alagoas) ASA (52); (Pará) Remo (54); (Rio Grande do Sul) Ypiranga (55)
Group E	Group F	Group G	Group H
(Minas Gerais) Tombense (56); (Maranhão) Moto Club (65); (Acre (state)) Rio Branco (66); (Bahia) Juazeirense (67); (Paraíba) Campinense (69); (Goiás) Aparecidense (71); (Piauí) River (72); (Ceará) Ferroviário (73); (Piauí) Altos (76); (Rio Grande do Sul) São José (79)	(Minas Gerais) URT (81); (Santa Catarina (state)) Brusque (86); (Sergipe) Itabaiana (87); (Pernambuco) Central (88); (Mato Grosso) Sinop (89); (Rio de Janeiro (state)) Boavista (91); (Pará) São Raimundo (93); Sergipe (94); (Roraima) São Raimundo (96); (Rondônia) Real Ariquemes (107)	(Maranhão) Imperatriz (111); (Federal District (Brazil)) Brasiliense (118); (Santa Catarina (state)) Tubarão (127); (Amazonas (Brazilian state)) Manaus (134); (Mato Grosso do Sul) Corumbaense (140); (Paraná (state)) Foz do Iguaçu (152); (Tocantins) Palmas (158); (Amazonas (Brazilian state)) Fast Clube (159); (Rio de Janeiro (state)) Americano (160); (Ceará) Atlético Cearense (175)	(Acre (state)) Galvez (189); (Mato Grosso) Mixto (218); (São Paulo (state)) Votuporanguense (no rank); (Rio Grande do Sul) Avenida (no rank); (Pará) Bragantino (no rank); (Rio Grande do Norte) Santa Cruz de Natal (no rank); (Federal District (Brazil)) Sobradinho (no rank); (Mato Grosso do Sul) Operário (no rank); (Espírito Santo) Serra (no rank); (Amapá) Ypiranga (no rank)

== First stage ==
In the first stage, each tie was played on a single match basis. The lower CBF ranked team hosted the match. If tied, the higher CBF ranked team would advance to second stage.

Team 1	Score	Team 2
Ferroviário (Ceará)	2–2	(São Paulo (state)) Corinthians
Avenida (Rio Grande do Sul)	1–0	(São Paulo (state)) Guarani
Central (Pernambuco)	1–1	Ceará
Foz do Iguaçu (Paraná (state))	1–0	(Minas Gerais) Boa Esporte
Aparecidense (Goiás)	2–0	(São Paulo (state)) Ponte Preta
Bragantino (Pará)	1–0	(Alagoas) ASA
URT (Minas Gerais)	3–2	(Paraná (state)) Coritiba
Manaus (Amazonas (Brazilian state))	1–1	(Goiás) Vila Nova
Campinense (Paraíba)	0–2	(Rio de Janeiro (state)) Botafogo
Ypiranga (Amapá)	0–1	(Mato Grosso) Cuiabá
São Raimundo (Roraima)	0–0	(Minas Gerais) América Mineiro
Palmas (Tocantins)	0–1	(Rio Grande do Sul) Juventude
Moto Club (Maranhão)	2–0	(Bahia) Vitória
Galvez (Acre (state))	0–1	(Rio Grande do Norte) ABC
Sinop (Mato Grosso)	1–2	(Pernambuco) Santa Cruz
Imperatriz (Maranhão)	1–1	(Pernambuco) Náutico
River (Piauí)	0–5	(Rio de Janeiro (state)) Fluminense
Votuporanguense (São Paulo (state))	0–1	(Rio Grande do Sul) Ypiranga
Boavista (Rio de Janeiro (state))	1–2	(Santa Catarina (state)) Figueirense
Corumbaense (Mato Grosso do Sul)	0–0	(Mato Grosso) Luverdense
Rio Branco (Acre (state))	2–2	Bahia
Santa Cruz de Natal (Rio Grande do Norte)	1–0	(Minas Gerais) Tupi
Sergipe	0–2	Goiás
Brasiliense (Federal District (Brazil))	0–0	(Alagoas) CRB
Altos (Piauí)	1–7	(São Paulo (state)) Santos
Sobradinho (Federal District (Brazil))	0–0	(Rio Grande do Norte) América de Natal
Brusque (Santa Catarina (state))	1–1	(Goiás) Atlético Goianiense
Atlético Cearense (Ceará)	2–0	(Santa Catarina (state)) Joinville
São José (Rio Grande do Sul)	0–0	(Santa Catarina (state)) Chapecoense
Mixto (Mato Grosso)	1–0	(Alagoas) CSA
São Raimundo (Pará)	0–2	(Santa Catarina (state)) Criciúma
Fast Clube (Amazonas (Brazilian state))	1–6	(São Paulo (state)) Oeste
Tombense (Minas Gerais)	3–0	(Pernambuco) Sport
Operário (Mato Grosso do Sul)	1–4	(Paraíba) Botafogo
Itabaiana (Sergipe)	2–5	(Paraná (state)) Paraná
Americano (Rio de Janeiro (state))	1–2	(Paraná (state)) Londrina
Juazeirense (Bahia)	2–2	(Rio de Janeiro (state)) Vasco da Gama
Serra (Espírito Santo)	1–0	(Pará) Remo
Real Ariquemes (Rondônia)	1–4	(Santa Catarina (state)) Avaí
Tubarão (Santa Catarina (state))	0–0	(Rio Grande do Sul) Brasil de Pelotas

Notes

1. On 22 February 2019, the Superior Tribunal de Justiça Desportiva (STJD) annulled the result of the Aparecidense v Ponte Preta match on 12 February 2019 and ordered that it be replayed. STJD determined that match referee Léo Simão Holanda annulled a Ponte Preta's goal with the help of "external interference". Originally Aparecidense had defeated Ponte Preta 1–0.

== Second stage ==
In the second stage, each tie was played on a single match basis. If tied, extra time would not be played and the penalty shoot-out would be used to determine the winner.

Team 1	Score	Team 2
Corinthians (São Paulo (state))	4–2	(Rio Grande do Sul) Avenida
Foz do Iguaçu (Paraná (state))	0–0 (2–4 p)	Ceará
Bragantino (Pará)	3–2	(Goiás) Aparecidense
URT (Minas Gerais)	2–2 (4–5 p)	(Goiás) Vila Nova
Botafogo (Rio de Janeiro (state))	3–0	(Mato Grosso) Cuiabá
Juventude (Rio Grande do Sul)	2–1	(Minas Gerais) América Mineiro
ABC (Rio Grande do Norte)	2–2 (5–3 p)	(Maranhão) Moto Club
Santa Cruz (Pernambuco)	1–1 (4–2 p)	(Pernambuco) Náutico
Fluminense (Rio de Janeiro (state))	3–0	(Rio Grande do Sul) Ypiranga
Luverdense (Mato Grosso)	1–0	(Santa Catarina (state)) Figueirense
Santa Cruz de Natal (Rio Grande do Norte)	0–1	Bahia
Goiás	1–1 (2–3 p)	(Alagoas) CRB
Santos (São Paulo (state))	4–0	(Rio Grande do Norte) América de Natal
Atlético Cearense (Ceará)	0–4	(Goiás) Atlético Goianiense
Mixto (Mato Grosso)	1–2	(Santa Catarina (state)) Chapecoense
Criciúma (Santa Catarina (state))	0–0 (7–6 p)	(São Paulo (state)) Oeste
Tombense (Minas Gerais)	2–2 (6–7 p)	(Paraíba) Botafogo
Londrina (Paraná (state))	1–1 (5–4 p)	(Paraná (state)) Paraná
Serra (Espírito Santo)	0–2	(Rio de Janeiro (state)) Vasco da Gama
Avaí (Santa Catarina (state))	2–0	(Rio Grande do Sul) Brasil de Pelotas

== Third stage ==
In the third stage, each tie was played on a home-and-away two-legged basis. If tied on aggregate, the away goals rule would not be used, extra time would not be played and the penalty shoot-out would be used to determine the winner.

Team 1	Agg.	Team 2	1st leg	2nd leg
Ceará	2–3	(São Paulo (state)) Corinthians	1–3	1–0
Vila Nova (Goiás)	3–2	(Pará) Bragantino	2–0	1–2
Botafogo (Rio de Janeiro (state))	2–3	(Rio Grande do Sul) Juventude	1–1	1–2
ABC (Rio Grande do Norte)	1–3	(Pernambuco) Santa Cruz	1–0	0–3
Luverdense (Mato Grosso)	0–2	(Rio de Janeiro (state)) Fluminense	0–0	0–2
CRB (Alagoas)	1–2	Bahia	1–1	0–1
Atlético Goianiense (Goiás)	1–3	(São Paulo (state)) Santos	1–0	0–3
Chapecoense (Santa Catarina (state))	5–2	(Santa Catarina (state)) Criciúma	3–2	2–0
Botafogo (Paraíba)	3–5	(Paraná (state)) Londrina	0–2	3–3
Vasco da Gama (Rio de Janeiro (state))	4–2	(Santa Catarina (state)) Avaí	3–2	1–0

== Fourth stage ==
The draw for the fourth stage was held on 12 April 2019, 11:00 at CBF headquarters in Rio de Janeiro. The 10 qualified teams were in a single group (CBF ranking shown in parentheses).

Group
- (São Paulo (state)) Santos (4)
- (São Paulo (state)) Corinthians (5)
- (Santa Catarina (state)) Chapecoense (10)
- (Rio de Janeiro (state)) Fluminense (13)
- (Rio de Janeiro (state)) Vasco da Gama (14)
- Bahia (15)
- (Pernambuco) Santa Cruz (28)
- (Rio Grande do Sul) Juventude (31)
- (Goiás) Vila Nova^{[1]} (34)
- (Paraná (state)) Londrina (35)

^{1} The identity of Winners 62 team was not known at the time of the draw.

In the fourth stage, each tie was played on a home-and-away two-legged basis. If tied on aggregate, the away goals rule would not be used, extra time would not be played and the penalty shoot-out would be used to determine the winner.

Team 1	Agg.	Team 2	1st leg	2nd leg
Juventude (Rio Grande do Sul)	0–0 (4–3 p)	(Goiás) Vila Nova	0–0	0–0
Fluminense (Rio de Janeiro (state))	2–2 (3–2 p)	(Pernambuco) Santa Cruz	2–0	0–2
Chapecoense (Santa Catarina (state))	1–2	(São Paulo (state)) Corinthians	1–0	0–2
Santos (São Paulo (state))	3–2	(Rio de Janeiro (state)) Vasco da Gama	2–0	1–2
Bahia	5–2	(Paraná (state)) Londrina	4–0	1–2

== Final stages ==
In the final stages, each tie was played on a home-and-away two-legged basis. If tied on aggregate, the away goals rule would not be used, extra time would not be played and the penalty shoot-out would be used to determine the winner.

=== Bracket ===
Round of 16
(Rio Grande do Sul) Juventude	0	0	0
(Rio Grande do Sul) Grêmio	0	3	3
(São Paulo (state)) São Paulo	0	0	0
Bahia	1	1	2
(Ceará) Fortaleza	0	0	0
(Paraná (state)) Athletico Paranaense	0	1	1
(São Paulo (state)) Corinthians	0	0	0
(Rio de Janeiro (state)) Flamengo	1	1	2
(Rio de Janeiro (state)) Fluminense	1	2	3 (1)
(Minas Gerais) Cruzeiro (p)	1	2	3 (3)
(Minas Gerais) Atlético Mineiro	0	2	2
(São Paulo (state)) Santos	0	1	1
(Maranhão) Sampaio Corrêa	0	0	0
(São Paulo (state)) Palmeiras	1	2	3
(Rio Grande do Sul) Internacional	3	1	4
(Pará) Paysandu	1	0	1

Quarter-finals
(Rio Grande do Sul) Grêmio	1	1	2
Bahia	1	0	1
(Paraná (state)) Athletico Paranaense (p)	1	1	2 (3)
(Rio de Janeiro (state)) Flamengo	1	1	2 (1)
(Minas Gerais) Cruzeiro	3	0	3
(Minas Gerais) Atlético Mineiro	0	2	2
(São Paulo (state)) Palmeiras	1	0	1 (4)
(Rio Grande do Sul) Internacional (p)	0	1	1 (5)

Semi-finals
(Rio Grande do Sul) Grêmio	2	0	2 (4)
(Paraná (state)) Athletico Paranaense (p)	0	2	2 (5)
(Minas Gerais) Cruzeiro	0	0	0
(Rio Grande do Sul) Internacional	1	3	4

Finals
(Paraná (state)) Athletico Paranaense	1	2	3
(Rio Grande do Sul) Internacional	0	1	1

=== Round of 16 ===
The draw for the round of 16 was held on 2 May 2019, 15:00 at CBF headquarters in Rio de Janeiro. The 16 qualified teams were divided in two pots. Teams from Pot 1 were the ones which competed at the 2019 Copa Libertadores. Pot 2 was composed of the five teams which qualified through the Fourth Stage plus the champions of 2018 Copa Verde, 2018 Copa do Nordeste and 2018 Campeonato Brasileiro Série B.

- CBF ranking shown in brackets.

Pot 1	Pot 2
(São Paulo (state)) Palmeiras (1); (Minas Gerais) Cruzeiro (2); (Rio Grande do Sul) Grêmio (3); (Rio de Janeiro (state)) Flamengo (6); (Minas Gerais) Atlético Mineiro (7); (Paraná (state)) Athletico Paranaense (8); (Rio Grande do Sul) Internacional (9); (São Paulo (state)) São Paulo (12)	(São Paulo (state)) Santos (4); (São Paulo (state)) Corinthians (5); (Rio de Janeiro (state)) Fluminense (13); Bahia (15); (Pará) Paysandu (27); (Rio Grande do Sul) Juventude^{[+]} (31); (Ceará) Fortaleza (33); (Maranhão) Sampaio Corrêa (38)

^{+} The identity of Winners 71 team was not known at the time of the draw.

The first legs were played from 15 to 23 May and the second legs were played from 29 May to 6 June 2019.

Team 1	Agg.	Team 2	1st leg	2nd leg
Internacional (Rio Grande do Sul)	4–1	(Pará) Paysandu	3–1	1–0
Corinthians (São Paulo (state))	0–2	(Rio de Janeiro (state)) Flamengo	0–1	0–1
Atlético Mineiro (Minas Gerais)	2–1	(São Paulo (state)) Santos	0–0	2–1
Juventude (Rio Grande do Sul)	0–3	(Rio Grande do Sul) Grêmio	0–0	0–3
Sampaio Corrêa (Maranhão)	0–3	(São Paulo (state)) Palmeiras	0–1	0–2
Fortaleza (Ceará)	0–1	(Paraná (state)) Athletico Paranaense	0–0	0–1
Fluminense (Rio de Janeiro (state))	3–3 (1–3 p)	(Minas Gerais) Cruzeiro	1–1	2–2
São Paulo (São Paulo (state))	0–2	Bahia	0–1	0–1

=== Quarter-finals ===
The draw for the quarter-finals was held on 10 June 2019, 15:00 at CBF headquarters in Rio de Janeiro. All teams were placed into a single pot.

- CBF ranking shown in brackets.

Pot
- (São Paulo (state)) Palmeiras (1)
- (Minas Gerais) Cruzeiro (2)
- (Rio Grande do Sul) Grêmio (3)
- (Rio de Janeiro (state)) Flamengo (6)
- (Minas Gerais) Atlético Mineiro (7)
- (Paraná (state)) Athletico Paranaense (8)
- (Rio Grande do Sul) Internacional (9)
- Bahia (15)

The first legs were played on 10 and 11 July and the second legs were played on 17 July 2019.

Team 1	Agg.	Team 2	1st leg	2nd leg
Grêmio (Rio Grande do Sul)	2–1	Bahia	1–1	1–0
Athletico Paranaense (Paraná (state))	2–2 (3–1 p)	(Rio de Janeiro (state)) Flamengo	1–1	1–1
Cruzeiro (Minas Gerais)	3–2	(Minas Gerais) Atlético Mineiro	3–0	0–2
Palmeiras (São Paulo (state))	1–1 (4–5 p)	(Rio Grande do Sul) Internacional	1–0	0–1

=== Semi-finals ===
The draw to determine the home-and-away teams for both legs was held on 22 July 2019, 15:00 at CBF headquarters in Rio de Janeiro. The first legs were played on 7 and 14 August and the second legs were played on 4 September 2019.

Team 1	Agg.	Team 2	1st leg	2nd leg
Grêmio (Rio Grande do Sul)	2–2 (4–5 p)	(Paraná (state)) Athletico Paranaense	2–0	0–2
Cruzeiro (Minas Gerais)	0–4	(Rio Grande do Sul) Internacional	0–1	0–3

=== Finals ===
The draw to determine the home-and-away teams for both legs was held on 5 September 2019, 15:00 at CBF headquarters in Rio de Janeiro.

11 September 2019
21:30

Athletico Paranaense (Paraná (state))	1–0	(Rio Grande do Sul) Internacional
Bruno Guimarães 57'	Report

Arena da Baixada, Curitiba
Attendance: 38,490
Referee: Raphael Claus (São Paulo)

18 September 2019
21:30

Internacional (Rio Grande do Sul)	1–2	(Paraná (state)) Athletico Paranaense
López 31'	Report	Léo Cittadini 24'; Rony 90+6'

Estádio Beira-Rio, Porto Alegre
Attendance: 46,747
Referee: Wilton Sampaio (Goiás)

2019 Copa do Brasil Champions
Athletico Paranaense
1st Title

== Top goalscorers ==
Rank	Player	Team	1S	2S	3S1	3S2	4S1	4S2	⅛F1	⅛F2	QF1	QF2	SF1	SF2	F1	F2	Total
1	(Peru) Paolo Guerrero	(Rio Grande do Sul) Internacional							2	1	0	0	0	2	0	0	5
1	(Brazil) Luciano	(Rio de Janeiro (state)) Fluminense	2	1	0	1	1	0	0	0							5
1	(Brazil) Pipico	(Pernambuco) Santa Cruz	1	1	0	2	0	1									5
4	(Brazil) Daniel Amorim	(Santa Catarina (state)) Avaí	2	2	0	0											4
4	(Brazil) Gilberto	Bahia	2	1	0	0	0	0	x	0	1	0					4
4	(Brazil) Nando	(Paraíba) Botafogo	2	0	0	2											4
4	(Uruguay) Carlos Sánchez	(São Paulo (state)) Santos	2	0	x	2	0	0	x	0							4
8	(Brazil) Clayton	(Paraíba) Botafogo	0	2	0	1											3
8	(Brazil) Erik	(Rio de Janeiro (state)) Botafogo	0	2	1	0											3
8	(Brazil) Gustavo	(São Paulo (state)) Corinthians	2	1	x	0	x	x	x	0							3
8	(Brazil) Jenison	(Paraná (state)) Paraná	2	1													3
8	(Brazil) Marco Goiano	(Pará) Bragantino	0	2	0	1											3
8	(Brazil) Rodrygo	(São Paulo (state)) Santos	x	1	0	1	1	0	0	x							3
8	(Brazil) Thiago Neves	(Minas Gerais) Cruzeiro							x	2	1	x	0	0			3

Source:CBF
