= 2019 Copa do Brasil Fourth Stage =

The 2019 Copa do Brasil fourth stage was the fourth stage of the 2019 Copa do Brasil football competition. It was played from 17 April to 7 May 2019. A total of 10 teams competed in the fourth stage to decide five places in the final stages of the 2019 Copa do Brasil.

== Draw ==
The draw for the fourth stage was held on 12 April 2019, 11:00 at CBF headquarters in Rio de Janeiro. The 10 qualified teams were in a single group (CBF ranking shown in parentheses).

Group
- (São Paulo (state)) Santos (4)
- (São Paulo (state)) Corinthians (5)
- (Santa Catarina (state)) Chapecoense (10)
- (Rio de Janeiro (state)) Fluminense (13)
- (Rio de Janeiro (state)) Vasco da Gama (14)
- Bahia (15)
- (Pernambuco) Santa Cruz (28)
- (Rio Grande do Sul) Juventude (31)
- (Goiás) Vila Nova^{[1]} (34)
- (Paraná (state)) Londrina (35)

^{1} The identity of Winners 62 team was not known at the time of the draw.

== Format ==
In the fourth stage, each tie was played on a home-and-away two-legged basis. If tied on aggregate, the away goals rule would not be used, extra time would not be played and the penalty shoot-out would be used to determine the winner.

== Matches ==
All times are Brasília time, BRT (UTC−3)

Team 1	Agg.	Team 2	1st leg	2nd leg
Juventude (Rio Grande do Sul)	0–0 (4–3 p)	(Goiás) Vila Nova	0–0	0–0
Fluminense (Rio de Janeiro (state))	2–2 (3–2 p)	(Pernambuco) Santa Cruz	2–0	0–2
Chapecoense (Santa Catarina (state))	1–2	(São Paulo (state)) Corinthians	1–0	0–2
Santos (São Paulo (state))	3–2	(Rio de Janeiro (state)) Vasco da Gama	2–0	1–2
Bahia	5–2	(Paraná (state)) Londrina	4–0	1–2

=== Match 71 ===
24 April 2019
21:30

Juventude (Rio Grande do Sul)	0–0	(Goiás) Vila Nova
	Report

Estádio Alfredo Jaconi, Caxias do Sul
Attendance: 6,107
Referee: Thiago Duarte Peixoto (São Paulo)

7 May 2019
21:30

Vila Nova (Goiás)	0–0	(Rio Grande do Sul) Juventude
	Report
Penalties
Alan Mineiro (penalty scored); Danilo (penalty missed); Juninho (penalty scored); Patrick (penalty missed); Rafael Santos (penalty scored)	3–4	(penalty missed) Dalberto; (penalty scored) Genílson; (penalty scored) Eltinho; (penalty scored) João Paulo; (penalty scored) Bruno Alves

Estádio Serra Dourada, Goiânia
Attendance: 21,776
Referee: Vinícius Gonçalves Dias Araújo (São Paulo)

Tied 0–0 on aggregate, Juventude won on penalties and advanced to the round of 16.

=== Match 72 ===
17 April 2019
21:30

Fluminense (Rio de Janeiro (state))	2–0	(Pernambuco) Santa Cruz
Gilberto 18'; Luciano 30'	Report

Maracanã, Rio de Janeiro
Attendance: 19,860
Referee: Sávio Pereira Sampaio (Distrito Federal)

25 April 2019
21:30

Santa Cruz (Pernambuco)	2–0	(Rio de Janeiro (state)) Fluminense
Jô 71'; Pipico 75'	Report
Penalties
Pipico (penalty scored); Charles (penalty missed); Marcos Martins (penalty missed); Guilherme Queiróz (penalty scored); William Alves (penalty missed)	2–3	(penalty scored) Luciano; (penalty missed) Gilberto; (penalty scored) Pedro; (penalty scored) Airton

Estádio do Arruda, Recife
Attendance: 25,802
Referee: Flávio Rodrigues de Souza (São Paulo)

Tied 2–2 on aggregate, Fluminense won on penalties and advanced to the round of 16.

=== Match 73 ===
17 April 2019
21:30

Chapecoense (Santa Catarina (state))	1–0	(São Paulo (state)) Corinthians
Aylon 34'	Report

Arena Condá, Chapecó
Attendance: 7,758
Referee: Bruno Arleu de Araújo (Rio de Janeiro)

24 April 2019
21:30

Corinthians (São Paulo (state))	2–0	(Santa Catarina (state)) Chapecoense
Boselli 16'; Mateus Vital 69'	Report

Arena Corinthians, São Paulo
Attendance: 33,582
Referee: Daniel Nobre Bins (Rio Grande do Sul)

Corinthians won 2–1 on aggregate and advanced to the round of 16.

=== Match 74 ===
17 April 2019
19:15

Santos (São Paulo (state))	2–0	(Rio de Janeiro (state)) Vasco da Gama
Rodrygo 47'; Jean Mota 66'	Report

Estádio Urbano Caldeira, Santos
Attendance: 8,659
Referee: Leandro Vuaden (Rio Grande do Sul)

24 April 2019
19:15

Vasco da Gama (Rio de Janeiro (state))	2–1	(São Paulo (state)) Santos
Raul 12'; Ricardo 38'	Report	Jorge 54'

Estádio São Januário, Rio de Janeiro
Attendance: 8,859
Referee: Rafael Traci (Santa Catarina)

Santos won 3–2 on aggregate and advanced to the round of 16.

=== Match 75 ===
18 April 2019
20:00

Bahia	4–0	(Paraná (state)) Londrina
Arthur Caíke 25'; Nino Paraíba 28'; Artur 77'; Fernandão 90+1'	Report

Arena Fonte Nova, Salvador
Attendance: 17,616
Referee: Péricles Bassols Pegado Cortez (Pernambuco)

25 April 2019
19:15

Londrina (Paraná (state))	2–1	Bahia
Anderson Oliveira 1'; Dagoberto 35' (pen.)	Report	Fernandão 22'

Estádio do Café, Londrina
Attendance: 752
Referee: Emerson de Almeida Ferreira (Minas Gerais)

Bahia won 5–2 on aggregate and advanced to the round of 16.
