= Taça Asa Branca =

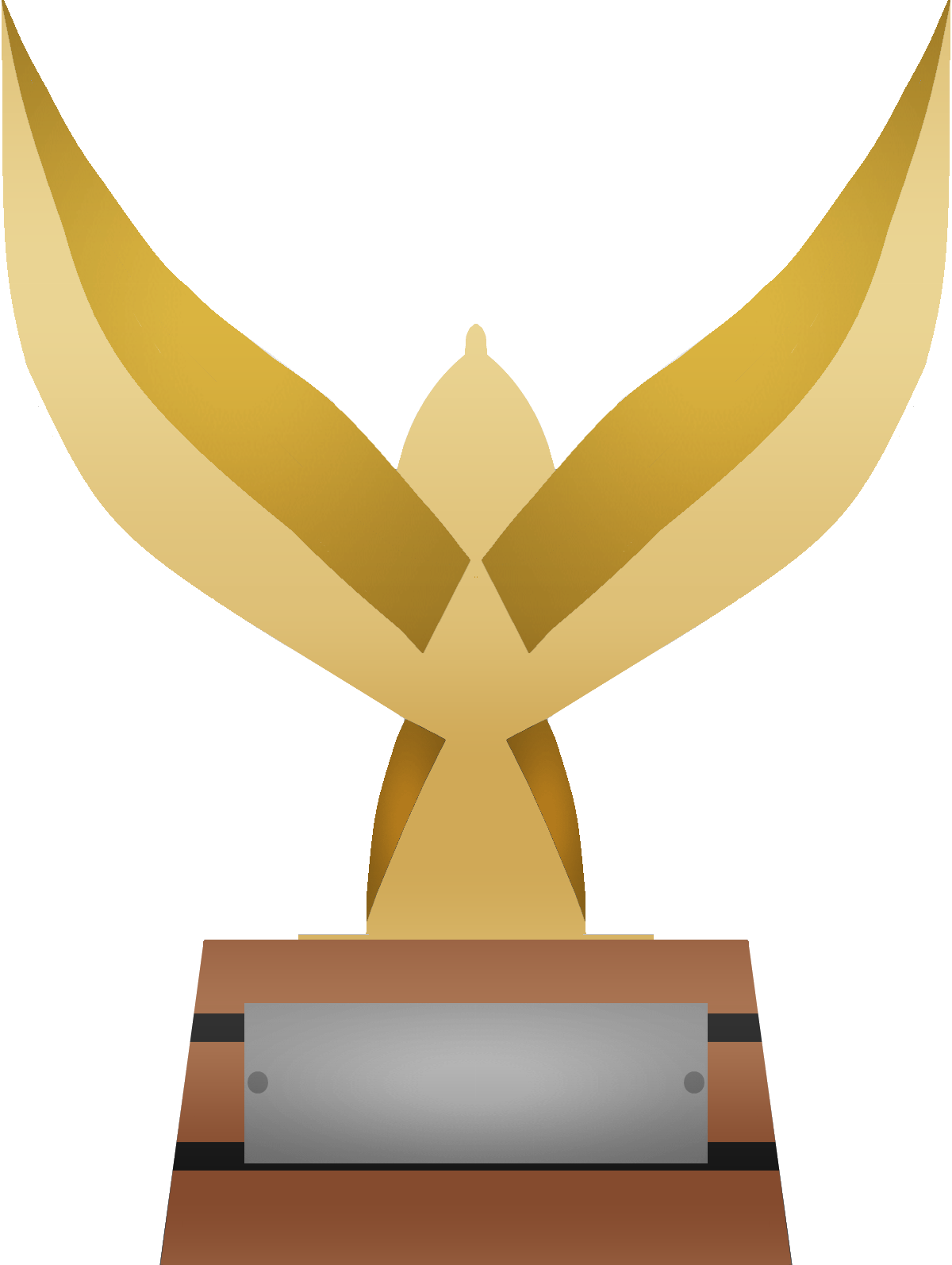
- Organising body: Liga do Nordeste
- Founded: 2016
- Folded: 2017
- Country: Brazil
- Number of clubs: 2
- Last champions: Santa Cruz (1st title)
- Most championships: Ceará and Santa Cruz (1 title)
- Broadcaster(s): Esporte Interativo

The Taça Asa Branca (English: White Wing Cup), was a friendly football super cup tournament, reuniting the winners of Copa do Nordeste and Copa Verde, the two minor (regional) cups of the Brazilian football pyramid. There were only two editions (one of them with an invited team), and it was discontinued due to lack of available dates.

== List of Champions ==
Year	Champion	Score	Runners-up
2016	Ceará; CE; 2015 Copa do Nordeste winners	3–3; 4–3 (pen.)	Flamengo; RJ; Invited
2017	Santa Cruz; PE; 2016 Copa do Nordeste winners	1–0	Paysandu; PA; 2016 Copa Verde winners

== Matches ==
=== 2016 Taça Asa Branca ===
Jan 21
22:30 (UTC−3)

Ceará	3–3	(Rio de Janeiro (state)) Flamengo
Siloé 26'; Bill 49'; Serginho 87'	Report	Emerson Sheik 58'; Salazar 83' (o.g.); Marcelo Cirino 86'
Penalties
Bill (penalty scored); Serginho (penalty scored); Richardson (penalty scored); Roni (penalty scored)	4–3	Emerson Sheik (penalty scored); Alan Patrick (penalty scored); Wallace (penalty missed); Marcelo Cirino (penalty scored); Guerrero (penalty missed)

Castelão, Fortaleza
Attendance: 35.500
Referee: César Magalhães

=== 2017 Taça Asa Branca ===
Jan 21
17:00 (UTC−3)

Santa Cruz (Pernambuco)	1–0	(Pará) Paysandu
Léo Costa 26'	Report

Arruda, Recife
Attendance: 15.000
Referee: Marcelo de Lima Henrique

== See also ==
- Supercopa do Brasil
