= São Bernardo FC =

São Bernardo
- Full name: São Bernardo Futebol Clube Ltda.
- Nicknames: Bernô; Tigre do ABC (Tiger of the ABC Region)
- Founded: 20 December 2004; 21 years ago
- Ground: 1º de Maio
- Capacity: 12,578
- Owner: Roberto Graziano
- President: Antônio Moreno (Tony)
- Head coach: Vinícius Bergantin
- League: Campeonato Brasileiro Série B Campeonato Paulista
- 2025 2025: Série C, 4th of 20 (promoted); Paulista, 5th of 16
Home colors	Away colors	Third colors

São Bernardo Futebol Clube, commonly referred to as São Bernardo, is a professional association football club based in São Bernardo do Campo, São Paulo, Brazil. The team competes in Série B, the second tier of Brazilian football, as well as in the Campeonato Paulista Série A1, the top division of the São Paulo state football league.

The club play their home games at the 12,578 capacity Estádio 1º de Maio. Supporters maintain rivalries with a number of fellow ABC Region clubs, including Santo André, São Caetano, Água Santa and crosstown rivals EC São Bernardo. The club's home colours are yellow and black and the team mascot is a Tiger.

São Bernardo participated six times in the Copa do Brasil, their best result being a fourth stage in 2026. The club also participated twice in Brasileiro Série D, achieving promotion to Brasileiro Série C in 2022. It also competed in Série C three times, being promoted to Brasileiro Série B in 2025. São Bernardo won the Campeonato Paulista Série A2 in 2012 and 2021 and the Copa Paulista in 2013 and 2021. The club's highest ever state league finish came in 2025 when they finished fifth in the Paulistão.

Founded in 2004, the club started in Campeonato Paulista Segunda Divisão in 2005, securing promotion to Série A3 by the end of the first year. In 2008, they were runners-up of Série A3 and were promoted to Campeonato Paulista Série A2. Following a fourth place finish in 2010, São Bernardo played in Série A1 for the first time in 2011, but stayed only one season in the top flight of the São Paulo state football league and were relegated back to Série A2. They returned to the state first division one year later and had a five-year stay in the Série A1 before being relegated at the end of the 2017 season.

== History ==
Despite being the largest city in the ABC region in terms of population and home to some of the most successful volleyball and handball teams in Brazil, São Bernardo do Campo has never had a great football tradition, unlike the neighboring cities of São Caetano do Sul and Santo André, whose clubs had already emerged with great performances on national scale. As a result, representatives of the city's amateur football competition, the São Bernardo do Campo Football League, political authorities and retired local players started thinking about doing something for São Bernardo's football.

In 2004, a group of politicians headed by the city's former Sports Secretary and then federal deputy Edinho Montemor and state deputy Orlando Morando, along with five more people, founded São Bernardo Futebol Clube. on December 20, 2004, with an investment of BR$ 100,000. The team would also receive, on behalf of the city, a subsidy in the amount of BR$ 400,000, but the project was not approved by the City Council of São Bernardo do Campo. The team is, since its foundation, a club-company, having its CNPJ registered on January 5, 2005 under the name of São Bernardo Futebol Clube Ltda. The club was founded with the ambitious goal of reaching the elite of state football in five years.

It achieved its goal in 2010 when it reached the elite of state football, where it remained until 2017 (except for 2012). In 2020, Magnum Group acquired 100% of the club, transforming it into a SAF (football limited company).

Under the management of the Magnum Group, São Bernardo achieved promotion back to the elite of state football in 2021 and reached Brasileiro Série C in 2022, eventually reaching Brasileiro Série B in 2026.

=== Kit ===
From 2020 until mid-2026, the club's uniform was manufactured by the club itself and sponsored by the club's own brand, the watchmaker Magnum..

Period	Kit manufacturer	Main shirt sponsor
2005–06	Reply	Armando Veículos
2007	Reply	SEGASP Sport
2008	Reply	Auto Shopping Cristal
2009	Champs	None
2010	Topper	None
2011–12	Kelme	Banco BMG
2013	Kappa	Seara
2014	Pulse	None
2015–16	Pulse	Crefisa
2017	Karilu	None
2018–19	Reply	None
2020	None	Magnum
2021–26	None	Magnum Bank
2026	Junpe	Magnum Bank

== Current squad ==
As of 11 July 2026

Note: Flags indicate national team as defined under FIFA eligibility rules; some limited exceptions apply. Players may hold more than one non-FIFA nationality.

No.	Pos.	Nation	Player
1	GK	BRA	Alex Alves
2	DF	BRA	Rodrigo Ferreira
3	DF	BRA	Hélder Maciel
5	DF	BRA	Matheus Salustiano
6	DF	BRA	Pará
7	FW	BRA	Lucas Rian
8	MF	BRA	Foguinho (captain)
9	FW	BRA	Felipe Garcia
10	FW	BRA	Fabrício Daniel
11	FW	BRA	Pedro Vitor
12	GK	BRA	Júnior Oliveira
14	MF	BRA	Lucas Lima
16	DF	BRA	Jota
17	MF	BRA	Romisson
20	FW	BRA	Felipe Rodrigues
21	DF	BRA	Hugo Sanches
22	GK	BRA	Léo Lang
25	DF	BRA	Wellington Manzoli

No.	Pos.	Nation	Player
26	MF	BRA	Dudu Miraíma (on loan from Vitória)
27	FW	BRA	Echaporã
29	FW	BRA	Pedrinho
30	MF	BRA	Breno Melo (on loan from Rio Branco AC)
31	MF	BRA	Lucas Fernandes
32	MF	BRA	Rodrigo Andrade
33	DF	BRA	Mário Sérgio
35	DF	BRA	Jemerson
36	MF	BRA	Galdino
37	FW	BRA	Daniel Davi (on loan from Santo André)
42	MF	BRA	Hyoran
70	FW	BRA	Lucas Reis
77	MF	BRA	Marcão
89	FW	BRA	Daniel Amorim
90	DF	BRA	Luizão
97	DF	BRA	Augusto
98	FW	BRA	Léo Jabá

=== Out on loan ===
Note: Flags indicate national team as defined under FIFA eligibility rules; some limited exceptions apply. Players may hold more than one non-FIFA nationality.

No.	Pos.	Nation	Player
—	DF	BRA	Caio Garcez (at Osasco Sporting until 30 May 2026)
—	MF	BRA	Kauã Jesus (at Guarani until 31 December 2026)

No.	Pos.	Nation	Player
—	FW	BRA	Matheus Goiás (at Noroeste until 30 October 2026)
—	FW	BRA	Nycollas Lopo (at América de Natal until 30 November 2026)

== Honours ==
=== Official tournaments ===
State
Competitions	Titles	Seasons
Copa Paulista	2	2013, 2021
Campeonato Paulista Série A2	2	2012, 2021

=== Others tournaments ===
==== State ====
- Taça Independência (1): 2023

=== Runners-up ===
- Campeonato Paulista Série A3 (1): 2008

== Stadium ==
Estádio Primeiro de Maio has been the home of the São Bernardo Futebol Clube professional team since its founding. The stadium has a maximum capacity of 17,000 people and has been the site of three São Bernardo FC title wins. It is owned by the club until 2037 via a public concession.

They also used the Estádio Municipal Giglio Portugal Pichinin (Estádio Baetão), which hosted some Copa Paulista matches for the professional team and was the home of the Tigre's youth teams from 2005 to 2019, where they played in the Campeonato Paulista Sub-15, Sub-17 and Sub-20, in addition to hosting the Copa São Paulo de Futebol Júnior for 13 years.
