= Martinez (Brazilian footballer) =

Brazilian footballer

Personal information
- Full name: Luis Fernando Lojudice Martinez
- Date of birth: 21 April 1980 (age 46)
- Place of birth: Magda, Brazil
- Height: 1.85 m (6 ft 1 in)
- Position: Midfielder

Youth career
- 1998–1999: Guarani

Senior career*
Years	Team	Apps	(Gls)
2000–2001	Guarani	26	(8)
2001	Internacional	13	(0)
2002	Guarani	21	(5)
2003–2006	Cruzeiro	62	(6)
2007–2008	Palmeiras	89	(6)
2009–2011	Cerezo Osaka	89	(10)
2012–2013	Náutico	59	(2)
2014	Criciúma	11	(0)
- * Club domestic league appearances and goals

Luís Fernando Lojudice Martinez (born 21 April 1980), known as just Martinez, is a Brazilian former professional footballer who played as a midfielder. His name is pronounced with stress on the final syllable.

== Honours ==
Cruzeiro

- Campeonato Brasileiro Série A: 2003
- Brazilian Cup: 2003
- Campeonato Mineiro: 2003, 2004, 2006

Palmeiras

- Campeonato Paulista: 2008
