= Marcos Vinícius (footballer, born 27 July 1991) =

Brazilian footballer

Marcos Vinícus
Personal information
- Full name: Marcos Vinícius Gomes Nascimento
- Date of birth: 27 June 1991 (age 35)
- Place of birth: São Paulo, Brazil
- Height: 1.90 m (6 ft 3 in)
- Position: Centre back

Team information
- Current team: Portuguesa

Youth career
- 2008–2010: Corinthians

Senior career*
Years	Team	Apps	(Gls)
2010	Corinthians	0	(0)
2010	→ Nacional-SP (loan)	0	(0)
2011	Ipitanga	1	(0)
2012	Palmeiras B	16	(2)
2013	Palmeiras	1	(0)
2014	→ Rio Claro (loan)	12	(0)
2014–2015	Vitória de Setúbal	4	(0)
2016	Santo André	9	(0)
2016	Red Bull Brasil	0	(0)
2017	XV Piracicaba	0	(0)
2017	Marília	?	(?)
2017	Portuguesa	0	(0)
2018	Linense	0	(0)
2019–	URT	0	(0)
- * Club domestic league appearances and goals as of 22:56, 24 April 2019 (UTC)

Marcos Vinícius Gomes Nascimento (born 27 June 1991), known as Marcos Vinícus, is a Brazilian professional footballer who plays for URT as a central defender.

== Career ==
Born in São Paulo, Marcos Vinícius is a product of Corinthians academy, representing Corinthians U20 in youth competitions. In 2012, he signed with Palmeiras, who immediately loaned with to Rio Claro in the Campeonato Paulista.

In July 2014, Marcos Vinícius made his first move abroad, joining Primeira Liga club, Vitória de Setúbal, on a two-year deal. He debuted on 17 August 2014, in a match against Rio Ave, but only appeared sporadically throughout his first year. He was released by Setúbal after one year and joined Santo André in December 2015. In January 2017, he joined XV de Piracicaba until the end of the 2017 Campeonato Brasileiro Série D.
