= Cleverson (footballer) =

Brazilian footballer (born 1983)

Personal information
- Full name: Cleverson Rosário dos Santos
- Date of birth: December 17, 1983 (age 42)
- Place of birth: Cachoeira do Sul, Rio Grande do Sul, Brazil
- Height: 1.81 m (5 ft 11 1/2 in)
- Position: Midfielder

Team information
- Current team: Cuiabá

Youth career
- 1999–2003: Grêmio São José

Senior career*
Years	Team	Apps	(Gls)
2005–2007	Atlético Paranaense	1	(0)
2007–2008	Fortaleza	7	(1)
2008	Novo Hamburgo	5	(0)
2008	Bahia	1	(0)
2008	Canoas		
2009	Guarani	8	(1)
2009	→ Criciúma (loan)	2	(1)
2009–2010	Grêmio Barueri	5	(1)
2010–2011	Noroeste	12	(2)
2011	→ Chapecoense (loan)	22	(5)
2011–2013	Avaí	45	(7)
2012	→ Náutico (loan)	12	(0)
2013	→ União Barbarense (loan)	10	(1)
2013–2014	Lajeadense	16	(3)
2014–	Cuiabá	-	(-)
- * Club domestic league appearances and goals as of 31 March 2014

Cleverson Rosário dos Santos known simply as Cleverson (born 17 December 1983) is a Brazilian professional footballer who currently plays for Clube Sete de Setembro, de Arroio do Meio. He usually plays in the attacking midfielder position.

== Club career ==
After stand out and win the Championship by Chapecoense Catarinense 2011, [1] was hired by Cleverson Avaí to operate in the Brazilian Championship Serie A. [2] His debut for the team in Florianopolis, occurred on June 26, 2011 in a game valid for the Brazilian Championship in which Avai was defeated by 1–0 to Fluminense in Ressacada. [3] in his ninth game for Avai Cleverson noted his first goal for the club. It was a beautiful shot from outside the area, [4] scoring the third goal in the game where Avai beat Ceara 3-0 by the Presidente Vargas stadium in Fortaleza. [5] On October 22, 2011, Cleverson marks a home run. In the game in which Avai beat Botafogo in Ressacada by 3-2 by the 31st round of the Brazilian Championship, Cleverson marked by bicycle, the second goal of the team. [6] [7] After not much advantage in Avaí in season 2012, Cleverson was negotiated with the Nautical. [8]

On September 23, 2012, its loan agreement with Nautical was terminated and he returned to Avai, to play the last 12 games remaining at Lion Island, in Serie B Brasileirão.

On 28 September 2013, aged almost 28, Cleverson, joined the Iranian Premier League club, Esteghlal with an 18-month contract.

=== Club career statistics ===
Club performance			League		Cup		Continental		Total	
Season	Club	League	Apps	Goals	Apps	Goals	Apps	Goals	Apps	Goals
Iran			League		Hazfi Cup		Asia		Total	
2012-13	Esteghlal	Persian Gulf Cup	-	-	-	-	-	-	-	-
Total	Iran		0	-	-	-	-	-	-	-
Career total			-	-	-	-	-	-	-	-

- Assist Goals

Season	Team	Assists
12–13	Esteghlal	-

== Honours ==
=== Club ===
Atlético Paranaense

- Brazil Campeonato Paranaense - 2005

Fortaleza

- Brazil Campeonato Cearense - 2007

Chapecoense

- Brazil Campeonato Catarinense - 2011

Avaí

- Brazil 2012 Campeonato Catarinense
