= Tanquinho =

Municipality of Bahia State, Brazil

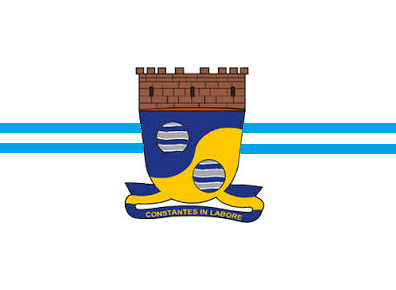
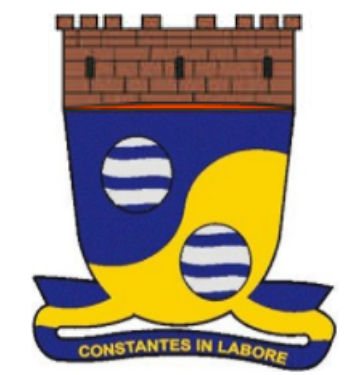
- Flag Coat of arms
- Motto: Trabalho Constante, e amor no coração
- Coordinates: 11°58′44″S 39°06′14″W
- Region: Nordeste
- State: Bahia
- Founded: 14 August 1958
- Elevation: 240 m (790 ft)

Population (2020)
  - Total: 7,928
- Time zone: UTC−3 (BRT)
- Postal code: 2931103

Tanquinho is a municipality in the state of Bahia in the North-East region of Brazil.

== See also ==
- List of municipalities in Bahia
