= Siloé (footballer) =

Brazilian footballer

Personal information
- Full name: Siloé Maciel Pereira
- Date of birth: 15 March 1991 (age 35)
- Place of birth: Juazeiro do Norte, Brazil
- Height: 1.79 m (5 ft 10 in)
- Position: Forward

Youth career
- 2004–2008: Ferroviário

Senior career*
Years	Team	Apps	(Gls)
2007–2008	Ferroviário		
2007	→ Terra e Mar (loan)		
2008	Quixadá		
2008	Alto Santo		
2009	Quixadá		
2009	Guarani de Juazeiro		
2010	Ergotelis		
2010	Ferroviário		
2010	Quixadá		
2011–2012	Horizonte		
2011	→ Internacional (loan)		
2012	→ Náutico (loan)		
2012	Boa Esporte		
2013	Guarani		
2013	São Caetano		
2013	Santa Cruz		
2014	Horizonte		
2014	Sampaio Corrêa		
2015–2017	Horizonte		
2015–2016	→ Ceará (loan)		
2016	→ Brasil de Pelotas (loan)		
2017	→ Santo André (loan)		
2018	Criciúma		
2018–2019	Ferroviário		
2019	Caucaia		
2020	Guarany de Sobral		
2020	Ferroviário		
2021	Caucaia		
2022	Botafogo-PB		
2022	Floresta		
2022	Maracanã		
2023	Tirol		
2023	Atlético Cearense		
2024	Nacional de Patos		
2024	Atlético Cearense		
2024	Atlético Piauiense		
2024	Caucaia		
2025	Tirol		
- * Club domestic league appearances and goals as of 29 August 2025

Siloé Maciel Pereira (born 15 March 1991), simply known as Siloé, is a Brazilian professional footballer who plays as forward.

== Career ==
Discovered by Ferroviário AC, Siloé played his first years in Ceará state clubs. However, he gained national recognition thanks to his dribbling skills in the 2011 Copa do Brasil match against Flamengo. Siloé was even considered for Flamengo after his impressive performance, but ended up being signed by Internacional in a loan period, where he never played a single game. The following year he was loaned out again, to Náutico, where he played during the 2012 Campeonato Brasileiro Série A. After spells at Boa Esporte, Guarani and São Caetano, he arrived at Santa Cruz, where he won the Série C in 2013.

In 2014 he returned to Horizonte and later played for Sampaio Corrêa in Série B. In June 2015 he was loaned to Ceará SC, where he won the Taça Asa Branca scoring a goal against CR Flamengo, a competition organized by the broadcaster Esporte Interativo (now TNT Sports) in celebration of winning the 2015 Copa do Nordeste.

In the following years he played for several teams, especially in the northeast region of Brazil, with emphasis on his return to Ferroviário, where he won the Copa Fares Lopes, Caucaia and Botafogo-PB. In 2023, Siloé played for Tirol in the Ceará second division. In 2024, he played for Nacional de Patos, Atlético Cearense, and Atlético Piauí. His last club was Tirol again in the 2025 Campeonato Cearense campaign.

== Personal life ==
Siloé is the younger brother of the also footballer Silas, who played for Tiradentes and Ferroviário teams in the 1990s.

== Honours ==
Santa Cruz

- Campeonato Brasileiro Série C: 2013

Ceará

- Taça Asa Branca: 2015

Ferroviário

- Copa Fares Lopes: 2018
- Copa dos Campeões Cearenses: 2019

Caucaia

- Copa Fares Lopes: 2019
