= Cascata (footballer) =

Brazilian footballer

Personal information
- Full name: Antônio Givanildo da Silva Santos
- Date of birth: 2 June 1982 (age 44)
- Place of birth: Tanquinho, Brazil
- Height: 1.70 m (5 ft 7 in)
- Position: Attacking midfielder

Senior career*
Years	Team	Apps	(Gls)
2004–2005	Catuense		
2006	ASA		
2007	Ferroviária		
2007	Votoraty		
2008	Mirassol		
2008	América-RN		
2008	Ferroviária		
2009	São Caetano		
2010	Sertãozinho		
2010–2012	ABC		
2011	→ Náutico (loan)		
2013–2016	América-RN		
2014	→ Boavista-RJ (loan)		
2014	→ Al-Faisaly (loan)		
2014	→ Sampaio Corrêa (loan)		
2016	Confiança		
2017	URT		
2017–2018	América-RN		
2018	Juazeirense		
2019	URT		
2020	Lagarto		
2020	Força e Luz		
2020	Próspera		
- * Club domestic league appearances and goals as of 20 March 2024

Antônio Givanildo da Silva Santos (born 2 June 1982), better known as Cascata, is a Brazilian former professional footballer who played as an attacking midfielder.

== Career ==
An attacking midfielder revealed by Catuense, Cascata was notable for his excellent spells at football clubs in Rio Grande do Norte. He was the highlight of the Série C title with ABC in 2010, and was later state champion and made more than 100 appearances for América de Natal. He also had relevant spells at Sampaio Corrêa, where he won the state championship, Boavista-RJ, Confiança and URT.

== Honours ==
ABC

- Campeonato Brasileiro Série C: 2010
- Campeonato Potiguar: 2011
- Copa RN: 2011

Sampaio Corrêa

- Campeonato Maranhense: 2014

América de Natal

- Campeonato Potiguar: 2015
- Copa RN: 2013
- Copa Cidade do Natal: 2015
