= Alyson (footballer, born April 1996) =

Brazilian footballer

Personal information
- Full name: Alyson Vinícius Almeida Neves
- Date of birth: 5 April 1996 (age 30)
- Place of birth: São Paulo, Brazil
- Height: 1.82 m (5 ft 11 1/2 in)
- Position: Left back

Team information
- Current team: Amazonas

Youth career
- 2013: Cotia
- 2014–2015: Tanabi
- 2016: Atibaia

Senior career*
Years	Team	Apps	(Gls)
2017–2018	Atlético Cajazeiras	23	(0)
2017	→ Botafogo-PB (loan)	12	(0)
2018	→ Sampaio Corrêa (loan)	29	(1)
2019–2020	Oeste	46	(0)
2020–2022	Ceará	16	(0)
2021	→ Juventude (loan)	16	(0)
2021	→ Sampaio Corrêa (loan)	7	(0)
2022	EC Água Santa	10	(0)
2022	ABC	11	(1)
2023	Caldense	7	(0)
2023	Sampaio Corrêa	27	(1)
2024	Boavista	12	(0)
2024	Athletic Club	3	(0)
2025	Boavista	6	(0)
2025–	Amazonas	19	(0)
- * Club domestic league appearances and goals as of 10 November 2026

Alyson Vinícius Almeida Neves (born 5 April 1996), simply known as Alyson, is a Brazilian footballer who plays as a left back for Amazonas.

== Career statistics ==
As of 25 October 2021

Club	Season	League			State League		Cup		Continental		Other		Total	
Club	Season	Division	Apps	Goals	Apps	Goals	Apps	Goals	Apps	Goals	Apps	Goals	Apps	Goals
Atlético de Cajazeiras	2017	Paraibano	—		14	0	—		—		—		14	0
Atlético de Cajazeiras	2018	Paraibano	—		9	0	—		—		—		9	0
Atlético de Cajazeiras	Total		—		23	0	—		—		—		23	0
Botafogo-PB (loan)	2017	Série C	12	0	—		—		—		—		12	0
Sampaio Corrêa (loan)	2018	Série B	20	0	—		1	0	—		8 (Note: Appearance(s) in Copa do Nordeste)	1	29	1
Oeste	2019	Série B	23	0	12	0	2	1	—		—		37	1
Oeste	2020	Série B	0	0	7	0	2	1	—		—		9	1
Oeste	Total		23	0	19	0	4	2	—		—		46	2
Ceará	2020	Série A	10	0	4	0	—		—		2	0	16	0
Juventude (loan)	2021	Série A	6	0	10	0	0	0	—		—		16	0
Sampaio Corrêa (loan)	2021	Série B	4	0	—		—		—		—		4	0
Career total			75	0	56	0	5	2	0	0	10	1	146	3
