= Reis (footballer, born 1988) =

Brazilian footballer

Personal information
- Full name: Deivdy Reis Marques do Nascimento
- Date of birth: 4 July 1988 (age 38)
- Place of birth: Juiz de Fora, Brazil
- Height: 1.88 m (6 ft 2 in)
- Position: Forward

Senior career*
Years	Team	Apps	(Gls)
2007–2008	Tupi		
2008	America-MG		
2009	Ferroviária		
2009–2010	Ponte Preta	42	(13)
2011	Cruzeiro	5	(0)
2011	Bahia	0	(0)
2012	Goiás	10	(3)
2012–2013	Náutico	7	(0)
2013	Avaí	27	(5)
2014	Oeste	14	(3)
2015	Marilia		
2015	Qingdao Jonoon	26	(7)
2016	Chainat Hornbill	10	(2)
2018	Tupi	9	(1)
2019	URT	0	(0)
2020	Juventus	0	(0)
- * Club domestic league appearances and goals as of 15 April 2019

Deivdy Reis Marques do Nascimento (born 4 July 1988), commonly known as Reis, is a Brazilian footballer.
