= Augusto (footballer, born 1997) =

Brazilian footballer

Personal information
- Full name: Augusto de Souza Silva
- Date of birth: 16 April 1997 (age 29)
- Place of birth: São Paulo, Brazil
- Height: 1.86 m (6 ft 1 in)
- Position: Centre-back

Team information
- Current team: São Bernardo
- Number: 97

Youth career
- Portuguesa
- 2014–2017: Palmeiras

Senior career*
Years	Team	Apps	(Gls)
2018	Palmeiras	0	(0)
2018	→ Santa Cruz (loan)	25	(2)
2019	→ Londrina (loan)	29	(1)
2020–2022	Londrina	60	(5)
2020	→ Juventude (loan)	20	(0)
2021	→ Coimbra (loan)	9	(1)
2023	Ferroviária	7	(0)
2023–2024	Tombense	23	(0)
2024	→ Volta Redonda (loan)	9	(0)
2024	ABC	3	(0)
2024–	São Bernardo	69	(2)
- * Club domestic league appearances and goals as of 18 November 2026

Augusto de Souza Silva (born 16 April 1997), simply known as Augusto, is a Brazilian footballer who plays as a centre-back for São Bernardo.

== Career ==
Augusto was born in São Paulo, and represented Portuguesa and Palmeiras as a youth. On 21 December 2017, after finishing his formation, he was loaned to Santa Cruz.

On 5 December 2018, Augusto moved to Londrina also in a one-year loan deal. He signed permanently for the club ahead of the 2020 season, but was loaned to Juventude on 21 June of that year.

Augusto spent the 2021 Campeonato Mineiro on loan at Coimbra before returning to LEC in May 2021, and subsequently became a starter. He lost his starting spot in the following year, and moved to Ferroviária on 5 January 2023.

On 11 April 2023, Augusto was announced at Tombense. He was loaned to Volta Redonda on 21 December, before moving to ABC the following 12 March.

On 20 April 2024, Augusto was announced at São Bernardo.

== Career statistics ==
As of 4 February 2025

Club	Season	League			State League		Cup		Continental		Other		Total	
Club	Season	Division	Apps	Goals	Apps	Goals	Apps	Goals	Apps	Goals	Apps	Goals	Apps	Goals
Santa Cruz	2018	Série C	15	0	10	2	0	0	—		7 (Note: Appearance(s) in Copa do Nordeste)	0	32	2
Londrina	2019	Série B	20	1	9	0	6	2	—		—		35	3
Londrina	2020	Série C	0	0	10	1	1	0	—		—		11	1
Londrina	2021	Série B	23	0	3	0	—		—		—		26	0
Londrina	2022	Série B	12	2	12	2	1	0	—		—		25	4
Londrina	Total		55	3	34	3	8	2	—		—		97	8
Juventude (loan)	2020	Série B	17	0	3	0	0	0	—		—		20	0
Coimbra (loan)	2021	Mineiro	—		9	1	—		—		—		9	1
Ferroviária	2023	Série D	0	0	7	0	—		—		—		7	0
Tombense	2023	Série B	23	0	—		1	0	—		—		24	0
Volta Redonda (loan)	2024	Série C	0	0	9	0	0	0	—		—		9	0
ABC	2024	Série C	0	0	3	0	—		—		3	0	6	0
São Bernardo	2024	Série C	20	1	—		—		—		—		20	1
São Bernardo	2025	Série C	0	0	5	1	—		—		—		5	1
São Bernardo	Total		20	1	5	1	—		—		—		25	2
Career total			130	4	80	7	9	2	0	0	10	0	229	11

== Honours ==
Londrina

- Campeonato Paranaense: 2021
