= Daniel Amorim =

Brazilian footballer (born 1989)

Personal information
- Full name: Daniel Amorim Dias da Silva
- Date of birth: 15 September 1989 (age 37)
- Place of birth: Rio de Janeiro, Brazil
- Height: 1.91 m (6 ft 3 in)
- Position: Forward

Team information
- Current team: São Bernardo
- Number: 89

Youth career
- 2010: Santarritense
- 2010: São José-SP

Senior career*
Years	Team	Apps	(Gls)
2011	Aquidauanense	20	(19)
2011	Marília	0	(0)
2012	Brasiliense	4	(1)
2012	Tupi	6	(0)
2013–2023	Tombense	99	(31)
2013	→ Madureira (loan)	16	(6)
2014	→ Duque de Caxias (loan)	9	(0)
2017	→ Paysandu (loan)	8	(0)
2017	→ Cuiabá (loan)	6	(1)
2018	→ Avaí (loan)	11	(3)
2019–2020	Avaí	31	(12)
2020	CRB	10	(0)
2018–2023	Tombense	45	(19)
2021	→ Vasco da Gama (loan)	22	(4)
2022	→ Vila Nova (loan)	31	(2)
2024	Athletic-MG	12	(2)
2024	Londrina	21	(7)
2025–2026	Velo Clube	17	(5)
2025	→ Operário Ferroviário (loan)	26	(6)
2026–	São Bernardo	22	(2)
- * Club domestic league appearances and goals as of 18 November 2026

Daniel Amorim Dias da Silva (born 15 September 1989), known as Daniel Amorim, is a Brazilian footballer who plays as a forward for São Bernardo.

== Club career ==
Born in Rio de Janeiro, Amorim began his career with Aquidauanense in 2011, scoring 19 goals and being the year's Campeonato Sul-Mato-Grossense top goalscorer. In September of that year, after a short spell at Marília, he signed for Brasiliense.

On 4 July 2012, Amorim signed for Tupi in the Série C. He moved to Tombense in the following year, and subsequently served loan stints at Madureira, Duque de Caxias, Paysandu and Cuiabá.

On 22 August 2018, still owned by Tombense, Amorim was loaned to Série B side Avaí until the end of the year. A backup option during his first year as his club achieved promotion to the Série A, he became a first-choice in the early stages of the 2019 season, reaching 13 goals in 19 matches during the first four months of the year.

Amorim made his first division debut on 5 May 2019, aged 29, starting in a 1–0 away loss against Bahia. He scored his first goal in the category on 19 May, netting a last-minute equalizer in a 1–1 draw at Vasco da Gama, but was subsequently rarely used and suffered an injury in September, ruling him out for the remainder of the season.

== Honours ==
Avaí

- Campeonato Catarinense: 2019

Operário Ferroviário

- Campeonato Paranaense: 2025
