= Clayton (footballer, born 1991) =

Brazilian footballer

Personal information
- Full name: Clayton da Rosa Peixoto
- Date of birth: 19 December 1991 (age 34)
- Place of birth: Santo Antônio da Patrulha, Brazil
- Height: 1.76 m (5 ft 9 in)
- Position: Midfielder

Youth career
- 2009–2012: Novo Hamburgo

Senior career*
Years	Team	Apps	(Gls)
2012	Novo Hamburgo	14	(0)
2012–2013	Palmeiras B	8	(1)
2013–2014	Juventude	1	(0)
2014–2015	Caxias	17	(2)
2015–2018	São José-RS	49	(3)
2016	→ Sport Recife (loan)	6	(0)
2016	→ Criciúma (loan)	8	(0)
2018	→ Ypiranga-RS (loan)	4	(0)
2019	Botafogo-PB	42	(14)
2019	São Caetano	11	(1)
2020–2023	Ferroviária	12	(0)
2020	→ Operário Ferroviário (loan)	8	(2)
2021	→ Botafogo-PB (loan)	25	(3)
2022	→ Manaus (loan)	1	(0)
2024	Pelotas	14	(1)
2025	Portuguesa-RJ	2	(0)
2025	Novo Hamburgo	17	(1)
- * Club domestic league appearances and goals as of 13 September 2025

Clayton da Rosa Peixoto (born 19 December 1991), simply known as Clayton, is a Brazilian professional footballer who plays as a midfielder.

== Career ==
Revealed in the youth sectors of Novo Hamburgo, he began his professional career at Palmeiras B in 2012. He played mostly in his home state, Rio Grande do Sul, with emphasis on Juventude, Caxias and São José. In 2016 he was loaned to Sport, after the athlete was involved in a controversy and was removed from the São José squad.

In 2019 Clayton experienced the best year of his career, being state champion with Botafogo-PB and the Copa Paulista with São Caetano. In 2020 he was hired by Ferroviária. For the Araraquara club, he was once again loaned to other teams competing in the Brazilian Championship (Operário-PR, Botafogo-PB and Manaus). After ending his relationship, in 2024 he was announced by EC Pelotas.

In the 2025 season, Clayton played for Portuguesa-RJ and Novo Hamburgo, where he was champion of Série A2.

== Honours ==
São José

- Copa Paulo Sant'Ana: 2017

Botafogo-PB

- Campeonato Paraibano: 2019

São Caetano

- Copa Paulista: 2019

Novo Hamburgo

- Campeonato Gaúcho Série A2: 2025
