= Pipico =

Brazilian footballer (born 1985)

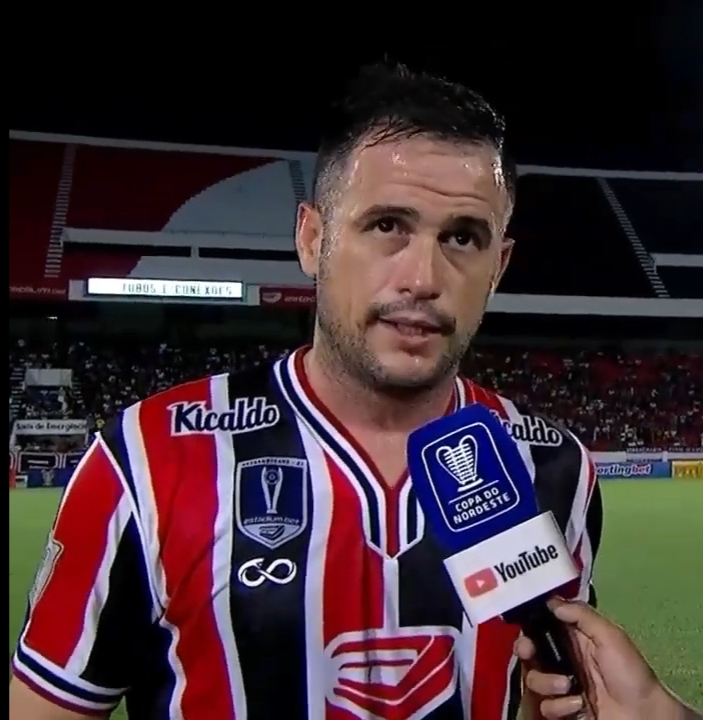
- Pipico playing for Santa Cruz

Personal information
- Full name: Wesley Henrique Lima Silva e Silva
- Date of birth: 7 March 1985 (age 41)
- Place of birth: Itaperuna, Rio de Janeiro, Brazil
- Height: 1.74 m (5 ft 9 in)
- Position: Striker

Team information
- Current team: Botafogo-PB

Youth career
- 2004: Itaperuna
- 2004: Angra dos Reis
- 2005: America (RJ)
- 2005: Bahia

Senior career*
Years	Team	Apps	(Gls)
2005–2006	Bahia		
2007	Floresta	28	(27)
2007	→ Operário de Muriaé		
2008–2009	Cabofriense		
2008	→ CFZ do Rio (loan)		
2009–2011	Bangu	46	(17)
2010	→ Quissamã (loan)		
2011–2012	Macaé	36	(14)
2012	Vasco da Gama	7	(0)
2013	FC Dallas		
2013	Atlético Goianiense	30	(9)
2014	XV de Piracicaba	7	(1)
2014	Red Bull Brasil	8	(1)
2014	Tarxien Rainbows	12	(9)
2015–2016	Macaé	35	(22)
2016	Guarani	22	(5)
2017	Volta Redonda	0	(0)
2017	Tombense	5	(3)
2017–2018	Macaé	3	(5)
2018–2021	Santa Cruz	77	(32)
2022	Madureira	11	(3)
2022	Paysandu	12	(0)
2023	Santa Cruz	21	(8)
2023–	Botafogo-PB	4	(3)
- * Club domestic league appearances and goals as of 7 October 2023

Wesley Henrique Lima Silva e Silva (born 7 March 1985), commonly known as Pipico, is a Brazilian footballer who plays as a striker for Botafogo-PB.

Pipico began his career as a youth player for Itaperuna, where he played for six months, before moving to Angra do Reis, America and Bahia, when Pipico started his professional career. After this, Pipico played for Floresta, Cabofriense, Bangu and Macaé, always having passages of great prominence, especially in Campeonato Carioca. In 2012, after one and a half year of interest and negotiations, Pipico made a move to Vasco da Gama to play Brazilian Série A, but wasn't very successful. He moved for first time to a foreign team, more precisely to play Major League Soccer for FC Dallas, but weeks later he returned to Brazil, signing with melhorAtlético Goianiense.

== Career ==
=== Vasco da Gama ===
For 1 1/2 years, Vasco da Gama showed interest in having Pipico in their squad. However, Vasco da Gama's optimal phase team in 2011 season meant that negotiations were postponed. On 20 April 2012, Pipico rescinded his contract with Macaé, to sign a contract for 8 months with Vasco da Gama. On the next day (Brazilian holiday, Tiradentes Day), Pipico was presented discreetly, but with enough optimism, promising to "take this opportunity in the best way possible and helping Vasco da Gama making goals to win titles."

Pipico made his debut for Vasco da Gama on 8 July in a 1-1 draw against Figueirense, entering in the second half subbed Alecsandro. Their games were against in the days following 21 July against Santos, 19 August against Flamengo (Clássico dos Milhões), and 29 August against Grêmio, as always reserve (entering in place of Carlos Alberto, Éder Luís and Carlos Alberto again, respectively). On 1 September, in a 2-0 win over Portuguesa, Pipico receives his first red card of his career, after applying a possible dangerous sliding tackle in Gustavo.

=== FC Dallas ===
Pipico moved to the United States on 18 December 2012 when he signed for Major League Soccer club FC Dallas. Pipico was released by Dallas just 6-weeks later on 1 February 2013 during their pre-season camp.

== Style of play ==
Pipico excelled at Fluminense football and is considered by the public as a complete forward. He is described as a quick striker with good technique, tactical commitment with good pace, jumping and heading, despite not being all that tall. Two months before signing for Vasco da Gama, players such as Juninho Pernambucano and Fellipe Bastos asked the striker about a transfer, saying that "it was time for (Pipico) goes to a big club." Journalists like Ledio Carmona and Raphael Rezende, from Globo and SporTV, already was describing Pipico as an "extremely interesting and intelligent forward, with amazing speed, extreme pace and handling, can appear either as a second striker, as a centre forward, making him an extremely dangerous player and deserving a special marking to stop him."

== Career statistics ==
(Correct as of April 5, 2013)

Club	Season	State League		League		Cup		Americas		Other^{1}		Total	
Club	Season	Apps	Goals	Apps	Goals	Apps	Goals	Apps	Goals	Apps	Goals	Apps	Goals
Floresta	2007	-	-	-	-	-	-	-	-	28	27	28	27
Floresta	Total	-	-	-	-	-	-	-	-	28	27	28	27
Cabofriense	2008	-	-	-	-	-	-	-	-	-	-	-	-
Cabofriense	2009	-	-	-	-	-	-	-	-	-	-	-	-
Cabofriense	Total	-	-	-	-	-	-	-	-	-	-	-	-
Bangu	2009	-	-	-	-	-	-	-	-	-	-	-	-
Bangu	2010	12	3	-	-	-	-	-	-	16	8	38	11
Bangu	2011	15	5	-	-	3	1	-	-	-	-	18	6
Bangu	Total	27	8	-	-	3	1	-	-	16	8	46	17
Macaé	2011	-	-	-	-	-	-	-	-	21	8	21	8
Macaé	2012	15	6	-	-	-	-	-	-	-	-	15	6
Macaé	Total	15	6	-	-	-	-	-	-	21	8	36	14
Vasco da Gama	2012	0	0	7	0	-	-	0	0	-	-	7	0
Vasco da Gama	Total	0	0	7	0	-	-	0	0	-	-	7	0
Atlético Goianiense	2013	12	7	-	-	-	-	-	-	-	-	12	7
Atlético Goianiense	Total	12	7	-	-	-	-	-	-	-	-	12	7
Career total		54	21	7	0	3	1	0	0	65	43	128	65

^{1}Includes other competitive competitions, including the Campeonato Brasileiro Série C, Copa Rio (state cup) and Campeonato Carioca Série B.

== Honours ==
Bangu

- Copa Rio (runner-up): 2010

=== Individual ===
- Campeonato Carioca Série B Most Valuable Player: 2007
- Campeonato Carioca Série B top scorer: 2007
- Campeonato Carioca Série B Newcomer of the Year: 2007
- Campeonato Carioca Newcomer of the Year: 2008
- Copa Rio Most Valuable Player: 2010
- Copa Rio top scorer: 2010
- Campeonato Carioca Best Supporting Striker: 2011
- Copa do Brasil top scorer:2019
