= 2019 Santos FC season =

Santos
2019 season
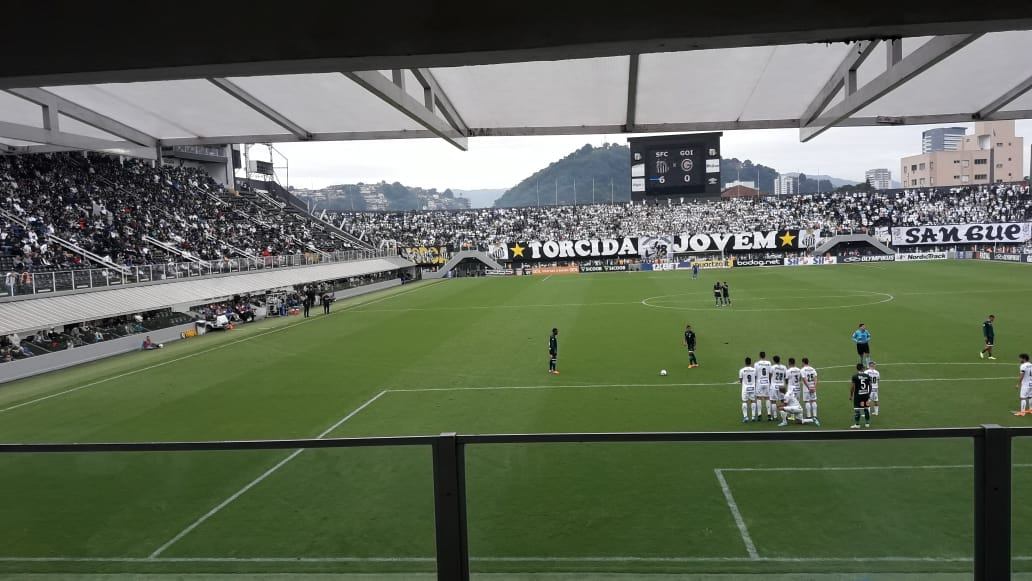
- Santos vs Goiás at the Vila Belmiro on 4 August
- President: José Carlos Peres
- Coach: Jorge Sampaoli
- Stadium: Vila Belmiro
- Campeonato Brasileiro: 2nd
- Campeonato Paulista: Semifinals
- Copa do Brasil: Round of 16
- Copa Sudamericana: First stage
- Top goalscorer: League: Eduardo Sasha (14); All: Sánchez (19)
- Highest home attendance: 38,542 vs Corinthians (8 April)
- Lowest home attendance: 0 vs River Plate (26 February)
Home colours	Away colours

The 2019 season was Santos Futebol Clube's 107th season in existence and the club's sixty consecutive season in the top flight of Brazilian football. As well as the Campeonato Brasileiro, the club competes in the Copa do Brasil, the Campeonato Paulista and also in Copa Sudamericana.

== Players ==
=== Squad information ===
As of 8 December 2019

No.	Name	Pos.	Nat.	Place of Birth	Date of Birth (Age)	Club caps	Club goals	Int. caps	Int. goals	Signed from	Date signed	Fee	Contract End
Goalkeepers
1	Vanderlei	GK	(Brazil)	Porecatu (Paraná (state))	1 February 1984 (aged 35)	258	0	–	–	Coritiba	23 January 2015	Undisc.	31 December 2020
22	Éverson	GK	(Brazil)	Pindamonhangaba (São Paulo (state))	22 July 1990 (aged 29)	41	0	–	–	Ceará	24 January 2019	R$ 4M	31 December 2022
33	John Victor	GK	(Brazil)	Diadema (São Paulo (state))	13 February 1996 (aged 23)	1	0	–	–	Youth System	11 January 2016	Free	12 January 2021
34	João Paulo	GK	(Brazil)	Dourados (Mato Grosso do Sul)	29 June 1995 (aged 24)	3	0	–	–	Youth System	26 February 2014	Free	29 September 2021
Defenders
2	Luiz Felipe	CB	(Brazil)	Tubarão (Santa Catarina (state))	9 October 1993 (aged 26)	90	4	–	–	Paraná	17 February 2016	R$ 1M	30 September 2022
3	Jorge	LB	(Brazil)	Rio de Janeiro (Rio de Janeiro (state))	28 March 1996 (aged 23)	35	2	1	0	Monaco (France)	27 March 2019	Loan	31 December 2019
4	Victor Ferraz (c)	RB	(Brazil)	João Pessoa (Paraíba)	14 January 1988 (aged 31)	265	10	–	–	Coritiba	18 June 2014	Free	29 December 2020
6	Gustavo Henrique	CB	(Brazil)	São Paulo (São Paulo (state))	24 March 1993 (aged 26)	222	13	–	–	Youth System	10 January 2013	Free	31 January 2020
14	Luan Peres	CB/LB	(Brazil)	São Paulo (São Paulo (state))	19 July 1994 (aged 25)	9	0	–	–	Club Brugge (Belgium)	1 August 2019	Loan	31 December 2020
26	Felipe Aguilar	CB	(Colombia)	Medellín	20 January 1993 (aged 26)	39	1	3	0	Atlético Nacional (Colombia)	18 January 2019	R$ 15M	31 December 2022
28	Lucas Veríssimo	CB	(Brazil)	Jundiaí (São Paulo (state))	2 July 1995 (aged 24)	153	5	–	–	Youth System	28 November 2015	Free	30 June 2022
31	Pará	RB	(Brazil)	São João do Araguaia (Pará)	14 February 1986 (aged 33)	199	2	–	–	Flamengo	1 August 2019	Free	31 December 2020
36	Felipe Jonatan	LB	(Brazil)	Fortaleza (Ceará)	15 February 1998 (aged 21)	33	2	–	–	Ceará	1 March 2019	R$ 6M	27 February 2024
42	Wagner Leonardo	CB/DM	(Brazil)	Praia Grande (São Paulo (state))	23 July 1999 (aged 20)	1	0	–	–	Youth System	21 February 2019	Free	30 June 2021
—	Matheus Ribeiro	RB/LB	(Brazil)	Erechim (Rio Grande do Sul)	23 October 1993 (aged 26)	15	0	–	–	Atlético-GO	11 November 2016	Free	31 December 2020
Midfielders
5	Alison	DM	(Brazil)	Cubatão (São Paulo (state))	1 March 1993 (aged 26)	208	4	–	–	Youth System	9 September 2011	Free	4 December 2022
7	Pato Sánchez	CM/AM	(Uruguay)	Montevideo	2 December 1984 (aged 35)	76	23	38	1	Monterrey (Mexico)	23 July 2018	Free	31 December 2021
8	Christian Cueva	AM	(Peru)	Trujillo	23 November 1991 (aged 28)	16	0	66	10	Krasnodar (Russia)	7 February 2019	Loan	30 January 2020
10	Yeferson Soteldo	RW/AM	(Venezuela)	Acarigua	30 June 1997 (aged 22)	51	12	17	1	Huachipato (Chile)	12 January 2019	R$ 13M	31 December 2022
20	Jobson	DM	(Brazil)	São Paulo (São Paulo (state))	13 September 1995 (aged 24)	4	0	–	–	Red Bull Brasil	18 April 2019	R$ 4M	15 April 2024
21	Diego Pituca	CM/DM	(Brazil)	Mogi Guaçu (São Paulo (state))	1 August 1992 (aged 27)	101	5	–	–	Botafogo-SP	29 May 2017	Undisc.	30 April 2023
25	Evandro	AM	(Brazil)	Blumenau (Santa Catarina (state))	23 August 1986 (aged 33)	18	1	–	–	Hull City (England)	1 July 2019	Free	31 July 2020
38	Sandry	CM/DM	(Brazil)	Itabuna (Bahia)	30 August 2002 (aged 17)	3	0	–	–	Youth System	18 January 2019	Trainee	31 July 2022
41	Jean Mota	AM/LB	(Brazil)	São Paulo (São Paulo (state))	15 October 1993 (aged 26)	165	15	–	–	Fortaleza	9 June 2016	Free	30 June 2022
—	Bryan Ruiz	AM/SS	(Costa Rica)	San José	18 August 1985 (aged 34)	14	0	125	26	Sporting (Portugal)	11 July 2018	Free	31 December 2020
—	Lucas Lourenço	AM	(Brazil)	Santos (São Paulo (state))	23 January 2001 (aged 18)	1	0	–	–	Youth System	1 January 2018	Free	27 September 2022
Forwards
9	Fernando Uribe	ST	(Colombia)	Pereira	1 January 1988 (aged 31)	11	0	2	0	Flamengo	30 May 2019	R$ 5M	31 December 2022
11	Marinho	SS	(Brazil)	Penedo (Alagoas)	29 May 1990 (aged 29)	28	8	–	–	Grêmio	24 May 2019	R$ 4M	31 December 2022
17	Derlis González	SS	(Paraguay)	Mariano Roque Alonso	20 March 1994 (aged 25)	55	9	43	7	Dynamo Kyiv (Ukraine)	31 July 2018	Loan	30 June 2020
19	Kaio Jorge	ST	(Brazil)	Olinda (Pernambuco)	24 January 2002 (aged 17)	8	0	–	–	Youth System	21 September 2018	Free	31 December 2021
27	Eduardo Sasha	SS/ST	(Brazil)	Porto Alegre (Rio Grande do Sul)	24 February 1992 (aged 27)	98	21	–	–	Internacional	9 January 2018	R$ 2.4M	31 December 2022
29	Yuri Alberto	ST	(Brazil)	S. J. dos Campos (São Paulo (state))	18 March 2001 (aged 18)	22	2	–	–	Youth System	28 July 2017	Free	31 December 2022
37	Lucas Venuto	SS	(Brazil)	Governador Valadares (Minas Gerais)	14 January 1995 (aged 24)	4	0	–	–	Vancouver Whitecaps (Canada)	2 August 2019	Free	31 December 2022
39	Tailson	SS/AM/RB	(Brazil)	Santo André (São Paulo (state))	5 March 1999 (aged 20)	11	1	–	–	Youth System	18 January 2019	Free	31 July 2024

Source: SantosFC.com.br (for appearances and goals), Wikipedia players' articles (for international appearances and goals), FPF (for contracts).

==== Reserve team ====
Note: Flags indicate national team as defined under FIFA eligibility rules; some limited exceptions apply. Players may hold more than one non-FIFA nationality.

No.	Pos.	Nation	Player
—	DF	BRA	Alan Cardoso
—	DF	BRA	Cadu
—	DF	BRA	Gustavo Cipriano
—	DF	ECU	Jackson Porozo
—	MF	BRA	Alexandre Tam

No.	Pos.	Nation	Player
—	MF	BRA	Anderson Ceará
—	MF	BRA	Sandro Perpétuo
—	MF	BRA	Victor Yan
—	FW	BRA	Bruno Marques (on loan from Lagartense)
—	FW	BRA	Lucas Sena

=== Copa Sudamericana squad ===
Note: Flags indicate national team as defined under FIFA eligibility rules; some limited exceptions apply. Players may hold more than one non-FIFA nationality.

No.	Pos.	Nation	Player
1	GK	BRA	Vanderlei
2	DF	BRA	Luiz Felipe
3	FW	BRA	Tailson
4	DF	BRA	Victor Ferraz
5	MF	BRA	Alison
6	DF	BRA	Gustavo Henrique
7	MF	URU	Carlos Sánchez
8	MF	BRA	Jean Mota
9	MF	BRA	Lucas Lourenço
10	MF	VEN	Yeferson Soteldo
11	FW	BRA	Rodrygo
12	MF	BRA	Sandry
13	DF	BRA	Kaique Rocha
14	DF	BRA	Matheus Ribeiro
15	DF	BRA	Orinho

No.	Pos.	Nation	Player
16	FW	COL	Jonathan Copete
17	FW	PAR	Derlis González
18	MF	BRA	Guilherme Nunes
19	FW	BRA	Kaio Jorge
20	FW	BRA	Felippe Cardoso
21	MF	BRA	Diego Pituca
22	GK	BRA	Éverson
23	FW	BRA	Arthur Gomes
24	GK	BRA	João Paulo
25	MF	BRA	Yuri Lima
26	DF	COL	Felipe Aguilar
27	FW	BRA	Eduardo Sasha
28	DF	BRA	Lucas Veríssimo
29	FW	BRA	Yuri Alberto
30	MF	BRA	Gabriel Calabres

=== Appearances and goals ===
No.	Pos.	Nat	Name	Campeonato Brasileiro		Campeonato Paulista		Copa Sudamericana		Copa do Brasil		Total	
No.	Pos.	Nat	Name	Apps	Goals	Apps	Goals	Apps	Goals	Apps	Goals	Apps	Goals
22	GK	(Brazil)	Éverson	32	0	2	0	0	0	7	0	41	0
1	GK	(Brazil)	Vanderlei	6	0	14	0	2	0	1	0	23	0
36	DF	(Brazil)	Felipe Jonatan	12+14	2	6+1	0	0	0	0	0	33	2
3	DF	(Brazil)	Jorge	28+1	1	0	0	0	0	4+2	1	35	2
14	DF	(Brazil)	Matheus Ribeiro	0	0	3+1	0	0+1	0	0	0	5	0
15	DF	(Brazil)	Orinho	0	0	4+2	0	1	0	0	0	7	0
31	DF	(Brazil)	Pará	8+3	0	0	0	0	0	0	0	11	0
4	DF	(Brazil)	Victor Ferraz	21+4	0	13	1	2	0	8	0	48	1
26	DF	(Colombia)	Felipe Aguilar	17	0	12+1	0	2	0	7	1	39	1
6	DF	(Brazil)	Gustavo Henrique	32	3	13+1	1	2	0	7	1	55	5
14	DF	(Brazil)	Luan Peres	8+1	0	0	0	0	0	0	0	9	0
28	DF	(Brazil)	Lucas Veríssimo	33	2	1+1	0	0	0	4	0	39	2
2	DF	(Brazil)	Luiz Felipe	3+5	0	8+2	1	0	0	1+1	1	19	2
42	DF	(Brazil)	Wagner Leonardo	0	0	0	0	0	0	0+1	0	1	0
5	MF	(Brazil)	Alison	15+8	0	11	0	2	0	5+1	1	42	1
8	MF	(Peru)	Christian Cueva	1+4	0	7+1	0	0	0	1+2	0	16	0
21	MF	(Brazil)	Diego Pituca	31+4	2	14	1	2	0	7	1	58	4
25	MF	(Brazil)	Evandro	14+4	1	0	0	0	0	0	0	18	1
30	MF	(Brazil)	Jean Lucas	8+1	0	4+1	0	0	0	3+3	0	20	0
41	MF	(Brazil)	Jean Mota	13+14	1	14+1	7	2	0	6+1	2	51	10
20	MF	(Brazil)	Jobson	1+3	0	0	0	0	0	0	0	4	0
7	MF	(Uruguay)	Pato Sánchez	27+7	12	12+3	3	2	0	6	4	57	19
31	MF	(Brazil)	Sandry	0+1	0	0+1	0	0	0	0+1	0	3	0
10	MF	(Venezuela)	Yeferson Soteldo	31+1	9	6+3	1	1+1	1	4+4	1	51	12
25	MF	(Brazil)	Yuri	0	0	4+3	0	0+2	0	1+1	0	11	0
23	FW	(Brazil)	Arthur Gomes	0	0	1+2	0	0	0	0	0	3	0
17	FW	(Paraguay)	Derlis González	9+7	1	10+1	5	2	0	6+1	2	36	8
27	FW	(Brazil)	Eduardo Sasha	34+3	14	4+1	0	0	0	1+6	0	48	14
20	FW	(Brazil)	Felippe Cardoso	0	0	3+3	0	0+1	0	0	0	7	0
9	FW	(Colombia)	Fernando Uribe	5+5	0	0	0	0	0	1	0	11	0
16	FW	(Colombia)	Jonathan Copete	1	0	6+5	1	2	0	1	0	15	1
19	FW	(Brazil)	Kaio Jorge	0+3	0	0+4	0	0	0	0	0	7	0
37	FW	(Brazil)	Lucas Venuto	0+4	0	0	0	0	0	0	0	4	0
11	FW	(Brazil)	Marinho	18+9	7	0	0	0	0	1	0	28	7
11	FW	(Brazil)	Rodrygo	4	1	3+7	1	0	0	6	3	20	5
39	FW	(Brazil)	Tailson	6+5	1	0	0	0	0	0	0	11	1
29	FW	(Brazil)	Yuri Alberto	0	0	1+1	0	0	0	0	0	2	0

Last updated: 8 December 2019
Source: Match reports in Competitive matches, Soccerway

=== Goalscorers ===
Ran	No.	Pos	Nat	Name	Brasileirão	Paulistão	Copa Sudamericana	Copa do Brasil	Total
1	7	MF	(Uruguay)	Pato Sánchez	12	3	0	4	19
2	27	FW	(Brazil)	Eduardo Sasha	14	0	0	0	14
3	17	MF	(Venezuela)	Yeferson Soteldo	9	1	1	1	12
4	41	MF	(Brazil)	Jean Mota	1	7	0	2	10
5	17	FW	(Paraguay)	Derlis González	1	5	0	2	8
5	11	FW	(Brazil)	Marinho	8	0	0	0	8
6	6	DF	(Brazil)	Gustavo Henrique	3	1	0	1	5
6	11	FW	(Brazil)	Rodrygo	1	1	0	3	5
7	21	MF	(Brazil)	Diego Pituca	2	1	0	1	4
8	36	DF	(Brazil)	Felipe Jonatan	2	0	0	0	2
8	3	DF	(Brazil)	Jorge	1	0	0	1	2
8	28	DF	(Brazil)	Lucas Veríssimo	2	0	0	0	2
8	2	DF	(Brazil)	Luiz Felipe	0	1	0	1	2
9	5	MF	(Brazil)	Alison	0	0	0	1	1
9	25	MF	(Brazil)	Evandro	1	0	0	0	1
9	26	DF	(Colombia)	Felipe Aguilar	0	0	0	1	1
9	16	FW	(Colombia)	Jonathan Copete	0	1	0	0	1
9	39	FW	(Brazil)	Tailson	1	0	0	0	1
9	4	DF	(Brazil)	Victor Ferraz	0	1	0	0	1
Own goals					2	1	0	0	3
Total					60	23	1	18	102

Last updated: 8 December 2019
Source: Match reports in Competitive matches

=== Disciplinary record ===
N	Nat	Pos	Name	Brasileirão			Paulista			Sudamericana			Copa do Brasil			Total		
N	Nat	Pos	Name	Yellow card	(yellow card) (yellow-red card)	Red card	Yellow card	(yellow card) (yellow-red card)	Red card	Yellow card	(yellow card) (yellow-red card)	Red card	Yellow card	(yellow card) (yellow-red card)	Red card	Yellow card	(yellow card) (yellow-red card)	Red card
6	(Brazil)	DF	Gustavo Henrique	10	0	2	1	0	0	0	0	0	2	1	0	13	1	2
28	(Brazil)	DF	Lucas Veríssimo	8	2	0	0	1	0	0	0	0	1	0	0	9	3	0
17	(Venezuela)	MF	Yeferson Soteldo	10	1	0	0	0	0	0	0	0	3	0	0	13	1	0
5	(Brazil)	MF	Alison	8	0	0	6	0	0	0	0	0	2	0	0	16	0	0
11	(Brazil)	FW	Marinho	11	1	0	0	0	0	0	0	0	0	0	0	11	1	0
21	(Brazil)	MF	Diego Pituca	8	0	0	6	0	0	0	0	0	0	0	0	14	0	0
17	(Paraguay)	FW	Derlis González	5	0	1	3	0	0	1	0	0	1	0	0	10	0	1
7	(Uruguay)	MF	Pato Sánchez	5	0	0	3	0	0	0	0	0	0	0	0	8	0	0
8	(Peru)	MF	Christian Cueva	1	0	0	1	0	0	0	0	0	1	0	1	3	0	1
14	(Brazil)	DF	Luan Peres	3	1	0	0	0	0	0	0	0	0	0	0	3	1	0
26	(Colombia)	DF	Felipe Aguilar	3	0	0	2	0	0	0	0	0	0	0	0	5	0	0
4	(Brazil)	DF	Victor Ferraz	4	0	0	1	0	0	0	0	0	0	0	0	5	0	0
25	(Brazil)	MF	Evandro	1	0	1	0	0	0	0	0	0	0	0	0	1	0	1
31	(Brazil)	DF	Pará	1	1	0	0	0	0	0	0	0	0	0	0	1	1	0
30	(Brazil)	MF	Jean Lucas	2	0	0	1	0	0	0	0	0	1	0	0	4	0	0
3	(Brazil)	DF	Jorge	4	0	0	0	0	0	0	0	0	0	0	0	4	0	0
11	(Brazil)	FW	Rodrygo	1	0	0	1	0	0	0	0	0	2	0	0	4	0	0
15	(Brazil)	DF	Orinho	0	0	0	0	0	0	0	0	1	0	0	0	0	0	1
27	(Brazil)	FW	Eduardo Sasha	2	0	0	1	0	0	0	0	0	0	0	0	3	0	0
20	(Brazil)	FW	Felippe Cardoso	0	0	0	2	0	0	1	0	0	0	0	0	3	0	0
9	(Colombia)	FW	Fernando Uribe	3	0	0	0	0	0	0	0	0	0	0	0	3	0	0
41	(Brazil)	MF	Jean Mota	3	0	0	0	0	0	0	0	0	0	0	0	3	0	0
2	(Brazil)	DF	Luiz Felipe	1	0	0	2	0	0	0	0	0	0	0	0	3	0	0
25	(Brazil)	MF	Yuri	0	0	0	1	0	0	1	0	0	1	0	0	3	0	0
22	(Brazil)	GK	Éverson	1	0	0	0	0	0	0	0	0	1	0	0	2	0	0
20	(Brazil)	MF	Jobson	2	0	0	0	0	0	0	0	0	0	0	0	2	0	0
14	(Brazil)	DF	Matheus Ribeiro	0	0	0	2	0	0	0	0	0	0	0	0	2	0	0
16	(Colombia)	FW	Jonathan Copete	0	0	0	1	0	0	0	0	0	0	0	0	1	0	0
19	(Brazil)	FW	Kaio Jorge	0	0	0	1	0	0	0	0	0	0	0	0	1	0	0
1	(Brazil)	GK	Vanderlei	0	0	0	1	0	0	0	0	0	0	0	0	1	0	0
TOTALS				97	6	4	36	1	0	3	0	1	15	1	1	151	8	6

As of 8 December 2019
Source: Match reports in Competitive matches
(yellow card) = Number of bookings; (yellow card) (yellow-red card) = Number of sending offs after a second yellow card; (red card) = Number of sending offs by a direct red card.

=== Suspensions served ===
Date	Matches Missed	Player	Reason	Opponents Missed	Competition	Source
27 January	1	Diego Pituca	3x (yellow card)	Bragantino (A)	Campeonato Paulista	
12 February	1	Orinho	(red card) vs River Plate (Uruguay)	River Plate (Uruguay) (H)	Copa Sudamericana	
18 February	1	Alison	3x (yellow card)	Palmeiras (A)	Campeonato Paulista	
10 March	1	Derlis González	3x (yellow card)	Novorizontino (H)	Campeonato Paulista	
11 March	1	Gustavo Henrique	Argument with Moisés in the match against Palmeiras	Novorizontino (H)	Campeonato Paulista	
20 March	1	Lucas Veríssimo	(red card) vs Botafogo–SP	Red Bull Brasil (H)	Campeonato Paulista	
4 April	1	Gustavo Henrique	(red card) vs Atlético Goianiense	Atlético Goianiense (H)	Copa do Brasil	
11 April	1	Christian Cueva	(red card) vs Atlético Goianiense	Vasco da Gama (H)	Copa do Brasil	
28 April	1	Derlis González	(red card) vs Grêmio	Fluminense (H)	Campeonato Brasileiro	
18 May	1	Alison	3x (yellow card)	Internacional (H)	Campeonato Brasileiro	
18 May	1	Derlis González	3x (yellow card)	Internacional (H)	Campeonato Brasileiro	
26 May	1	Diego Pituca	3x (yellow card)	Ceará (A)	Campeonato Brasileiro	
26 May	1	Gustavo Henrique	3x (yellow card)	Ceará (A)	Campeonato Brasileiro	
26 May	1	Yeferson Soteldo	3x (yellow card)	Ceará (A)	Campeonato Brasileiro	
9 June	1	Lucas Veríssimo	3x (yellow card)	Corinthians (H)	Campeonato Brasileiro	
21 July	1	Lucas Veríssimo	(red card) vs Botafogo	Avaí (H)	Campeonato Brasileiro	
28 July	1	Jorge Sampaoli	3x (yellow card)	Goiás (H)	Campeonato Brasileiro	
10 August	1	Felipe Aguilar	3x (yellow card)	Cruzeiro (A)	Campeonato Brasileiro	
18 August	1	Gustavo Henrique	(red card) vs Cruzeiro	Fortaleza (H)	Campeonato Brasileiro	
25 August	1	Marinho	3x (yellow card)	Chapecoense (A)	Campeonato Brasileiro	
25 August	1	Jorge	3x (yellow card)	Chapecoense (A)	Campeonato Brasileiro	
31 August	1	Victor Ferraz	3x (yellow card)	Athletico Paranaense (H)	Campeonato Brasileiro	
31 August	1	Yeferson Soteldo	3x (yellow card)	Athletico Paranaense (H)	Campeonato Brasileiro	
8 September	1	Diego Pituca	3x (yellow card)	Flamengo (A)	Campeonato Brasileiro	
14 September	1	Gustavo Henrique	3x (yellow card)	Grêmio (H)	Campeonato Brasileiro	
21 September	1	Jorge Sampaoli	3x (yellow card)	Fluminense (A)	Campeonato Brasileiro	
26 September	1	Marinho	(red card) vs Fluminense	CSA (H)	Campeonato Brasileiro	
29 September	1	Lucas Veríssimo	(red card) vs CSA	Vasco da Gama (A)	Campeonato Brasileiro	
5 October	1	Evandro	(red card) vs Vasco da Gama	Palmeiras (H)	Campeonato Brasileiro	
5 October	1	Yeferson Soteldo	3x (yellow card)	Palmeiras (H)	Campeonato Brasileiro	
9 October	1	Pato Sánchez	3x (yellow card)	Internacional (A)	Campeonato Brasileiro	
13 October	1	Marinho	3x (yellow card)	Ceará (H)	Campeonato Brasileiro	
13 October	1	Fernando Uribe	3x (yellow card)	Ceará (H)	Campeonato Brasileiro	
20 October	1	Lucas Veríssimo	3x (yellow card)	Corinthians (A)	Campeonato Brasileiro	
31 October	1	Alison	3x (yellow card)	Botafogo (H)	Campeonato Brasileiro	
6 November	1	Gustavo Henrique	(red card) vs Avaí	Goiás (A)	Campeonato Brasileiro	
23 November	1	Gustavo Henrique	3x (yellow card)	Fortaleza (A)	Campeonato Brasileiro	
23 November	1	Marinho	3x (yellow card)	Fortaleza (A)	Campeonato Brasileiro	
28 November	1	Luan Peres	3x (yellow card)	Chapecoense (H)	Campeonato Brasileiro	
28 November	1	Jean Mota	3x (yellow card)	Chapecoense (H)	Campeonato Brasileiro	
28 November	1	Yeferson Soteldo	(red card) vs Fortaleza	Chapecoense (H)	Campeonato Brasileiro	
28 November	1	Pará	(red card) vs Fortaleza	Chapecoense (H)	Campeonato Brasileiro	
28 November	1	Jorge Sampaoli	3x (yellow card)	Chapecoense (H)	Campeonato Brasileiro	
4 December	1	Luan Peres	(red card) vs Athletico Paranaense	Flamengo (H)	Campeonato Brasileiro	

== Managers ==
Name	Nat.	Place of Birth	Date of Birth (Age)	Signed from	Date signed	Role	Departure	Manner	Contract End
Jorge Sampaoli	(Argentina)	Casilda (Santa Fe Province)	13 May 1960 (aged 59)	Free agent	17 December 2018	Permanent			31 December 2020

== Transfers ==
=== Transfers in ===
N.	Pos.	Name	Age	Moving from	Type	Fee	Source
10	RW	(Venezuela) Yeferson Soteldo	21	Huachipato (Chile)	Transfer	R$ 13M	
26	DF	(Colombia) Felipe Aguilar	25	Atlético Nacional (Colombia)	Transfer	R$ 15M	
22	GK	(Brazil) Éverson	28	Ceará	Transfer	R$ 4M	
36	LB	(Brazil) Felipe Jonatan	21	Ceará	Transfer	R$ 6M	
–	AM	(Brazil) Vitor Bueno	24	Dynamo Kyiv (Ukraine)	Loan return	Free	
40	DM	(Brazil) Jobson	23	Red Bull Brasil	Transfer	R$ 4M	
11	SS	(Brazil) Marinho	28	Grêmio	Transfer	R$ 4M	
9	ST	(Colombia) Fernando Uribe	31	Flamengo	Transfer	R$ 5M	
–	LB	(Brazil) Caju	23	APOEL (Cyprus)	Loan return	Free	
–	AM	(Argentina) Emiliano Vecchio	30	Shabab Al-Ahli (United Arab Emirates)	Loan return	Free	
–	DF	(Argentina) Fabián Noguera	26	Gimnàstic (Spain)	Loan return	Free	
25	AM	(Brazil) Evandro	32	Hull City (England)	Transfer	Free	
31	RB	(Brazil) Pará	33	Flamengo	Transfer	Free	
37	SS	(Brazil) Lucas Venuto	24	Vancouver Whitecaps (Canada)	Transfer	Free	

=== Loans in ===
N.	Pos.	Name	Age	Loaned from	Loan expires	Fee	Source
8	AM	(Peru) Christian Cueva	27	Krasnodar (Russia)	December 2019	Free (Note: In the agreement, Santos is obligated to pay the transfer fee in 2020)	
30	DM	(Brazil) Jean Lucas	20	Flamengo	December 2019	Free (Note: Included in Bruno Henrique transfer.)	
3	LB	(Brazil) Jorge	23	Monaco (France)	December 2019	Free	
14	CB	(Brazil) Luan Peres	25	Club Brugge (Belgium)	December 2020	Free	

=== Transfers out ===
N.	Pos.	Name	Age	Moving to	Type	Fee	Source
35	CB	(Brazil) Robson Bambu	21	Athletico	End of contract	Free	
8	DM	(Brazil) Renato	39	—	Retired	—	
19	CM	(Brazil) Léo Cittadini	24	Athletico	End of contract	Free	
16	LB	(Brazil) Dodô	26	Sampdoria (Italy)	Loan return	Free	
10	FW	(Brazil) Gabriel	22	Internazionale (Italy)	Loan return	Free	
11	FW	(Brazil) Bruno Henrique	28	Flamengo	Transfer	R$ 23M	
32	MF	(Brazil) Gabriel Calabres	21	Cianorte	Contract terminated	Free	
–	AM	(Brazil) Matheus Oliveira	21	Ponte Preta	End of contract	Free	
–	DF	(Brazil) David Braz	31	Grêmio	Contract terminated	Free	
15	LB	(Brazil) Orinho	24	Free agent	End of contract	Free	
11	FW	(Brazil) Rodrygo	18	Real Madrid (Spain)	Transfer	R$ 193M	
30	DM	(Brazil) Jean Lucas	21	Flamengo	Loan terminated	Free	
–	AM	(Argentina) Emiliano Vecchio	30	Al-Ittihad (Saudi Arabia)	Transfer	R$ 2.5M	
–	LB	(Brazil) Caju	23	Braga (Portugal)	Transfer	R$ 1.5M	
13	CB	(Brazil) Kaique Rocha	18	Sampdoria (Italy)	Transfer	R$ 5.7M	

=== Loans out ===
N.	P	Name	Age	Loaned to	Loan expires	Source
–	LB	(Brazil) Romário	26	Red Bull Brasil	April 2019	
–	FW	(Brazil) Diego Cardoso	24	Guarani	December 2019	
–	AM	(Brazil) Matheus Oliveira	21	Ponte Preta	April 2019	
–	DF	(Argentina) Fabián Noguera	25	Gimnàstic (Spain)	July 2019	
30	DM	(Brazil) Juliano	24	Ponte Preta	December 2019	
12	GK	(Brazil) Vladimir	29	Avaí	December 2019	
35	AM	(Brazil) Rafael Longuine	28	Ponte Preta	December 2019	
–	FW	(Brazil) Rodrigão	25	Coritiba	December 2019	
38	RB	(Brazil) Daniel Guedes	24	Goiás	December 2019	
–	AM	(Brazil) Vitor Bueno	24	São Paulo	December 2020	
23	FW	(Brazil) Arthur Gomes	20	Chapecoense	December 2019	
–	LB	(Brazil) Romário	27	Bragantino	December 2019	
25	DM	(Brazil) Yuri	24	Fluminense	December 2019	
16	FW	(Colombia) Copete	31	Pachuca (Mexico)	June 2020	
–	DF	(Brazil) Cléber Reis	28	Oeste	December 2019	
20	FW	(Brazil) Felippe Cardoso	20	Ceará	December 2019	
–	DF	(Argentina) Fabián Noguera	26	Ponferradina (Spain)	July 2020	
18	DM	(Brazil) Guilherme Nunes	21	Paraná	December 2019	

=== Contracts ===
No.	Pos.	Nat.	Name	Age	Status	Contract length	Expiry date	Source
19	ST	(Brazil)	Kaio Jorge	16	Signed	3 years	December 2021	Santos FC
21	DM	(Brazil)	Diego Pituca	26	Signed	4 years	April 2023	Gazeta Esportiva
–	DM	(Brazil)	Sandry	16	Signed	3 years	July 2022	A Tribuna
35	FW	(Brazil)	Tailson	20	Signed	5 years	July 2024	A Tribuna

Last updated: 16 August 2019

== Pre-season and friendlies ==
13 January Pre-season friendly	Corinthians	1–1	Santos	São Paulo
17:00 UTC-02:00	Gustavo 4'; Ramiro (yellow card) 30'; Thiaguinho (yellow card) 71'; Araos (yellow card) 76'	Report	(yellow card) 8' Victor Ferraz; 24' (o.g.) Pedro Henrique; (yellow card) 77' Guilherme Nunes; (yellow card) 79' Daniel Guedes; (yellow card) 90' Yuri Alberto	Stadium: Arena Corinthians; Attendance: 32,954; Referee: Vinicius Furlan

== Competitions ==
=== Overview ===
Competition	First match	Last match	Starting round	Final position	Record							
Competition	First match	Last match	Starting round	Final position	Pld	W	D	L	GF	GA	GD	Win %
Série A	28 April 2019	8 December 2019	Matchday 1	Runners-up	38	22	8	8	60	33	+27	57.89
Copa do Brasil	6 February 2019	6 June 2019	First round	Round of 16	8	4	1	3	18	6	+12	50.00
Campeonato Paulista	19 January 2019	8 April 2019	Matchday 1	Semifinal	16	9	3	4	23	15	+8	56.25
Copa Sudamericana	12 February 2019	26 February 2019	First round	First round	2	0	2	0	1	1	+0	0.00
Total					64	35	14	15	102	55	+47	54.69

Source: Competitions

=== Campeonato Brasileiro ===
==== Results summary ====
Overall								Home						Away					
Pld	W	D	L	GF	GA	GD	Pts	W	D	L	GF	GA	GD	W	D	L	GF	GA	GD
38	22	8	8	60	33	+27	74	14	4	1	44	15	+29	8	4	7	16	18	−2

Last updated: 8 December 2019.
Source: Soccerway

==== Results by round ====
Round	1	2	3	4	5	6	7	8	9	10	11	12	13	14	15	16	17	18	19	20	21	22	23	24	25	26	27	28	29	30	31	32	33	34	35	36	37	38
Ground	A	H	A	H	A	H	A	H	H	A	A	H	H	A	A	H	A	H	A	H	A	H	A	H	A	H	A	A	H	H	A	A	H	H	A	H	A	H
Result	W	W	D	W	L	D	W	W	W	W	W	W	W	L	L	D	W	D	L	L	D	W	W	W	D	W	L	D	W	W	W	W	D	W	L	W	L	W
Position	9	3	4	2	4	5	3	2	2	2	2	1	1	1	1	2	2	2	3	3	3	3	3	2	3	3	3	3	3	3	3	3	3	2	2	2	2	2

Updated to match(es) played on 8 December 2019. Source: Globo Esporte
W = Win; D = Draw; L = Loss

==== League table ====
Pos	Team	Pld	W	D	L	GF	GA	GD	Pts	Qualification or relegation
1	Flamengo (C)	38	28	6	4	86	37	+49	90	Qualification for Copa Libertadores group stage (Note: Flamengo qualified for the Copa Libertadores group stage by winning the 2019 Copa Libertadores. Athletico Paranaense qualified for the Copa Libertadores group stage by winning the 2019 Copa do Brasil.)
2	Santos	38	22	8	8	60	33	+27	74	Qualification for Copa Libertadores group stage
3	Palmeiras	38	21	11	6	61	32	+29	74	Qualification for Copa Libertadores group stage
4	Grêmio	38	19	8	11	64	39	+25	65	Qualification for Copa Libertadores group stage
5	Athletico Paranaense	38	18	10	10	51	32	+19	64	Qualification for Copa Libertadores group stage

Source: CBF
Rules for classification: 1) points; 2) wins; 3) goal difference; 4) goals scored; 5) head-to-head results; 6) least red cards received; 7) least yellow cards received; 8) draw.
(C) Champions

==== Matches ====
28 April 1	Grêmio	1–2	Santos	Porto Alegre
11:00 UTC-03:00	Maicon (yellow card) 33'; Kannemann (yellow card) 39'; Matheus Henrique (yellow card) 53'; Everton 90+3'	Report	6' Eduardo Sasha; 35' Felipe Jonatan; (yellow card) 56' Alison; (yellow card) 69' Diego Pituca; (yellow card) 85' Lucas Veríssimo; (yellow card) 90+4' (red card) 90+5' González	Stadium: Arena do Grêmio; Attendance: 34,291; Referee: Bruno Arleu de Araújo

2 May 2	Santos	2–1	Fluminense	Santos
19:15 UTC-03:00	Rodrygo (yellow card) 36'; Soteldo (yellow card) 42'; Eduardo Sasha 65'; Sánchez 73'; Diego Pituca (yellow card) 90'	Report	(yellow card) 26' Airton; (yellow card) 53' Allan; 85' Pedro	Stadium: Vila Belmiro; Attendance: 10,564; Referee: Wilton Pereira Sampaio

5 May 3	CSA	0–0	Santos	Maceió
16:00 UTC-03:00	Bruno Ramires (yellow card) 3'	Report	(yellow card) 17' Jorge; (yellow card) 71' Gustavo Henrique; (yellow card) 85' Soteldo; (yellow card) 90+3' González	Stadium: Rei Pelé; Attendance: 10,313; Referee: Rodolpho Toski Marques

12 May 4	Santos	3–0	Vasco da Gama	São Paulo
16:00 UTC-03:00	Diego Pituca 19'; Rodrygo 33'; Jean Lucas (yellow card) 56'; Soteldo 73'; Alison (yellow card) 90+3'	Report	(yellow card) 28' Maxi López; (yellow card) 30' Rossi; (yellow card) 82' (yellow-red card) 86' Danilo Barcelos; (yellow card) 90' Ricardo Graça	Stadium: Pacaembu; Attendance: 12,952; Referee: Paulo Roberto Alves Júnior

18 May 5	Palmeiras	4–0	Santos	São Paulo
19:00 UTC-03:00	Gómez 6'; Deyverson 19'; Dudu (yellow card) 38'; Raphael Veiga 52'; Felipe Melo (yellow card) 84'; Hyoran 88'	Report	(yellow card) 37' González; (yellow card) 40' Gustavo Henrique; (yellow card) 70' Alison; (yellow card) 78' Victor Ferraz	Stadium: Pacaembu; Attendance: 32,501; Referee: Rafael Traci

26 May 6	Santos	0–0	Internacional	Santos
16:00 UTC-03:00	Jean Lucas (yellow card) 35'; Sampaoli (yellow card) 35'; Diego Pituca (yellow card) 54'; Soteldo (yellow card) 57'; Lucas Veríssimo (yellow card) 65'; Gustavo Henrique (yellow card) 90+6'	Report	(yellow card) 26' Bruno; (yellow card) 34' Nico López; (yellow card) 43' Rafael Sóbis; (yellow card) 45+1' Emerson Santos; (yellow card) 80' Iago	Stadium: Vila Belmiro; Attendance: 12,756; Referee: Rodolpho Toski Marques

2 June 7	Ceará	0–1	Santos	Fortaleza
16:00 UTC-03:00	Luiz Otávio (yellow card) 72'; Fernando Sobral (yellow card) 90+5'	Report	(yellow card) 45+1' Sánchez; 52' Eduardo Sasha	Stadium: Castelão; Attendance: 50,809; Referee: Ricardo Marques Ribeiro

9 June 8	Santos	3–1	Atlético Mineiro	Santos
16:00 UTC-03:00	Sampaoli (yellow card) 12'; Eduardo Sasha 39'; Jean Mota 45+5' (pen.); Sánchez 81'; Lucas Veríssimo (yellow card) 90+1'	Report	(yellow card) 45+3' Fábio Santos; 71' Alerrandro; (yellow card) 80' José Welison	Stadium: Vila Belmiro; Attendance: 5,794; Referee: Dewson Fernando Freitas da Silva

12 June 9	Santos	1–0	Corinthians	Santos
21:30 UTC-03:00	Aguilar (yellow card) 53'; Eduardo Sasha 59' (yellow card) 60'; Gustavo Henrique (yellow card) 81'; Victor Ferraz (yellow card) 85'	Report	(yellow card) 47' Danilo Avelar; (yellow card) 61' Vágner Love; (yellow card) 67' Méndez; (yellow card) 89' Clayson	Stadium: Vila Belmiro; Attendance: 11,831; Referee: Wagner do Nascimento Magalhães

13 July 10	Bahia	0–1	Santos	Salvador
19:00 UTC-03:00	Elton (yellow card) 41'; Moisés (yellow card) 90+2'	Report	(yellow card) 57' Aguilar; (yellow card) 58' Soteldo; (yellow card) 80' Diego Pituca; 87' Sánchez	Stadium: Pituaçu; Attendance: 18,853; Referee: Jean Pierre Gonçalves Lima

21 July 11	Botafogo	0–1	Santos	Rio de Janeiro
11:00 UTC-03:00	Gilson (yellow card) 10' (yellow-red card) 69'; Carli (yellow card) 51'	Report	(yellow card) 12' Gustavo Henrique; (yellow card) 18' (yellow-red card) 49' Lucas Veríssimo; 75' (yellow card) 77' Marinho	Stadium: Engenhão; Attendance: 16,248; Referee: Héber Lopes

28 July 12	Santos	3–1	Avaí	Santos
16:00 UTC-03:00	González 9'; Alison (yellow card) 15'; Sampaoli (yellow card) 15'; Sánchez 33'; Felipe Jonatan 78'; Uribe (yellow card) 78'	Report	28' João Paulo; (yellow card) 51' Marquinhos Silva; (yellow card) 54' Léo	Stadium: Vila Belmiro; Attendance: 12,787; Referee: Wagner Reway

4 August 13	Santos	6–1	Goiás	Santos
11:00 UTC-03:00	Sánchez 9'; Lucas Veríssimo 15'; Jorge (yellow card) 30'; Gustavo Henrique 37'; Eduardo Sasha 52'; Soteldo 68', 81' (yellow card) 69'; Uribe (yellow card) 89'	Report	(yellow card) 13' Kevin; (yellow card) 13' Yago; (yellow card) 38' Marlone; (yellow card) 57' (goal) 90+1' Kayke	Stadium: Vila Belmiro; Attendance: 13,462; Referee: Rafael Traci

10 August 14	São Paulo	3–2	Santos	São Paulo
17:00 UTC-03:00	Raniel (yellow card) 10'; Éverton (yellow card) 35'; Bruno Alves (yellow card) 37'; Alexandre Pato 49', 72'; Reinaldo 57' (pen.) (yellow card) 90+2'; Tchê Tchê (yellow card) 62'; Arboleda (yellow card) 85'	Report	(yellow card) 29' Aguilar; 44' Eduardo Sasha; 86' (o.g.) Raniel	Stadium: Morumbi; Attendance: 47,277; Referee: Raphael Claus

18 August 15	Cruzeiro	2–0	Santos	Belo Horizonte
16:00 UTC-03:00	Fred (yellow card) 31' (goal) 44'; Thiago Neves (yellow card) 45+5' (goal) 47'	Report	(red card) 4' Gustavo Henrique; (yellow card) 45+3' Sampaoli	Stadium: Mineirão; Attendance: 43,604; Referee: Anderson Daronco

25 August 16	Santos	3–3	Fortaleza	Santos
16:00 UTC-03:00	Marinho 2' (yellow card) 89'; Jorge 10' (yellow card) 90'; Eduardo Sasha 32'; Sánchez (yellow card) 76'	Report	(yellow card) 35' Juninho; 60' (pen.), 68' Wellington Paulista; (yellow card) 65' Carlinhos; (yellow card) 84' Felipe; 90+5' Tinga	Stadium: Vila Belmiro; Attendance: 12,515; Referee: Rodrigo D'Alonso Ferreira

31 August 17	Chapecoense	0–1	Santos	Chapecó
19:00 UTC-03:00	Arthur Gomes (yellow card) 29'; Eduardo (yellow card) 90+1'	Report	39' (o.g.) Gum; (yellow card) 50' Diego Pituca; (yellow card) 68' Éverson; (yellow card) 86' Victor Ferraz; (yellow card) 90+1' Soteldo	Stadium: Arena Condá; Attendance: 9,053; Referee: Bruno Arleu de Araújo

8 September 18	Santos	1–1	Athletico Paranaense	Santos
16:00 UTC-03:00	Diego Pituca (yellow card) 16'; Marinho (yellow card) 34'; Sánchez 90+1' (pen.); Lucas Veríssimo (yellow card) 90+10'	Report	(yellow card) 30' Lucho González; (yellow card) 34' Adriano; 42' Romero; (yellow card) 45+5' Matheus Rossetto; (yellow card) 64' Léo; (yellow card) 74' Thonny Anderson; (yellow card) 90+1' Mádson	Stadium: Vila Belmiro; Attendance: 12,589; Referee: Rodrigo Carvalhaes de Miranda

14 September 19	Flamengo	1–0	Santos	Rio de Janeiro
17:00 UTC-03:00	Gabriel (yellow card) 25' (goal) 44'; Bruno Henrique (yellow card) 34'	Report	(yellow card) 12' Gustavo Henrique; (yellow card) 24' Lucas Veríssimo; (yellow card) 27' Marinho; (yellow card) 70' Sampaoli; (yellow card) 74' Cueva; (yellow card) 89' Soteldo	Stadium: Maracanã; Attendance: 68,243; Referee: Braulio da Silva Machado

21 September 20	Santos	0–3	Grêmio	Santos
21:00 UTC-03:00	Sampaoli (yellow card) 32'; Soteldo (yellow card) 56'	Report	(yellow card) 20' Diego Tardelli; 55' Luan; (yellow card) 71' Michel; (yellow card) 78' Paulo Victor; (yellow card) 81' (goal) 90+3' Everton; 87' Pepê	Stadium: Vila Belmiro; Attendance: 10,898; Referee: Paulo Roberto Alves Júnior

26 September 21	Fluminense	1–1	Santos	Rio de Janeiro
20:00 UTC-03:00	Yuri (yellow card) 23'; Allan (yellow card) 38'; Lucas Veríssimo 45+3' (o.g.); Digão (red card) 72'; Frazan (red card) 90+3'	Report	40' Soteldo; (yellow card) 51' Alison; (yellow card) 74' Diego Pituca; (yellow card) 90+6' (yellow-red card) 90+9' Marinho	Stadium: Maracanã; Attendance: 11,032; Referee: Wilton Pereira Sampaio

29 September 22	Santos	2–0	CSA	Santos
16:00 UTC-03:00	Sánchez 35' (pen.); Lucas Veríssimo (yellow card) 38' (yellow-red card) 77'; Eduardo Sasha 57'	Report	(yellow card) 34' Naldo; (yellow card) 90+4' Ronaldo Alves	Stadium: Vila Belmiro; Attendance: 6,615; Referee: Wagner do Nascimento Magalhães

5 October 23	Vasco da Gama	0–1	Santos	Rio de Janeiro
17:00 UTC-03:00	Andrey (yellow card) 62'; Marrony (yellow card) 88'; Leandro Castán (yellow card) 90+4'; Ricardo Graça (yellow card) 90+5'	Report	50' Tailson; (yellow card) 64' Luan Peres; (red card) 79' Evandro; (yellow card) 82' Soteldo	Stadium: São Januário; Attendance: 17,083; Referee: Savio Pereira

9 October 24	Santos	2–0	Palmeiras	Santos
21:30 UTC-03:00	Gustavo Henrique 14'; Marinho 17'; Sánchez (yellow card) 76'	Report	(yellow card) 64' Felipe Melo; (yellow card) 70' Carlos Eduardo; (red card) 73' Willian	Stadium: Vila Belmiro; Attendance: 11,408; Referee: Flavio Rodrigues de Souza

13 October 25	Internacional	0–0	Santos	Porto Alegre
16:00 UTC-03:00	Cuesta (yellow card) 48'; D'Alessandro (yellow card) 72'	Report	(yellow card) 45+1' Marinho; (yellow card) 58' Sampaoli; (yellow card) 81' Jean Mota; (yellow card) 86' Uribe	Stadium: Beira-Rio; Attendance: 13,572; Referee: Bruno Arleu de Araújo

17 October 26	Santos	2–1	Ceará	Santos
19:15 UTC-03:00	Jobson (yellow card) 20'; Sánchez (yellow card) 45+3'; Eduardo Sasha 56'; Gustavo Henrique (yellow card) 82' (goal) 84'	Report	18' Lima; (yellow card) 51' Willian Oliveira; (yellow card) 59' Thiago Galhardo; (yellow card) 59' Fabinho; (yellow card) 90+4' Samuel Xavier	Stadium: Vila Belmiro; Attendance: 7,804; Referee: Rafael Traci

20 October 27	Atlético Mineiro	2–0	Santos	Belo Horizonte
16:00 UTC-03:00	Luan 2' (yellow card) 39'; Leonardo Silva 22'; Elias (yellow card) 32'; Otero (yellow card) 72'	Report	(yellow card) 27' Soteldo; (yellow card) 32' Lucas Veríssimo; (yellow card) 37' González; (yellow card) 90+1' Luan Peres; (yellow card) 90+2' Sampaoli	Stadium: Independência; Attendance: 21,771; Referee: Caio Max Augusto Vieira

26 October 28	Corinthians	0–0	Santos	São Paulo
17:00 UTC-03:00	Boselli (yellow card) 76'; Danilo Avelar (yellow card) 90+1'; Gil (yellow card) 90+4'	Report	(yellow card) 77' Jobson	Stadium: Arena Corinthians; Attendance: 32,416; Referee: Luiz Flavio de Oliveira

31 October 29	Santos	1–0	Bahia	Santos
19:15 UTC-03:00	Pará (yellow card) 27'; Marinho (yellow card) 32'; Alison (yellow card) 45+1'; Sánchez 54' (pen.); Jean Mota (yellow card) 82'; Lucas Veríssimo (yellow card) 86'	Report	(yellow card) 30' Gregore; (yellow card) 46' João Pedro; (yellow card) 66' Ronaldo	Stadium: Vila Belmiro; Attendance: 5,634; Referee: Wagner do Nascimento Magalhães

3 November 30	Santos	4–1	Botafogo	Santos
19:00 UTC-03:00	Eduardo Sasha 3'; Marinho 13' (yellow card) 85'; Soteldo 68', 69'	Report	34' Igor Cássio	Stadium: Vila Belmiro; Attendance: 7,524; Referee: Rodrigo D'Alonso Ferreira

6 November 31	Avaí	1–2	Santos	Florianópolis
21:00 UTC-03:00	João Paulo 35'; Luanderson (yellow card) 37'; Léo (yellow card) 52' (yellow-red card) 85'; Franco (yellow card) 73'; Igor (yellow card) 82'; Gegê (yellow card) 90+3'	Report	9' Eduardo Sasha; 24' Marinho; (yellow card) 45+1' (red card) 62' Gustavo Henrique; (yellow card) 75' Luiz Felipe	Stadium: Ressacada; Attendance: 4820; Referee: Marcelo de Lima Henrique

9 November 32	Goiás	0–3	Santos	Goiânia
17:00 UTC-03:00	Rafael Vaz (yellow card) 43'; Michael (yellow card) 45+1'; Alan Ruschel (yellow card) 56'; Gilberto (yellow card) 90+5'	Report	25', 73' Soteldo; 60' Marinho; (yellow card) 65' Alison; (yellow card) 66' Jorge	Stadium: Serra Dourada; Attendance: 13,226; Referee: Bruno Arleu de Araújo

16 November 33	Santos	1–1	São Paulo	Santos
17:00 UTC-03:00	Sánchez 8' (pen.)	Report	(yellow card) 26' Bruno Alves; (yellow card) 33' Vitor Bueno; 55' Dani Alves; (yellow card) 85' Pablo	Stadium: Vila Belmiro; Attendance: 14,062; Referee: Flávio Rodrigues de Souza

23 November 34	Santos	4–1	Cruzeiro	Santos
21:00 UTC-03:00	Eduardo Sasha 23'; Gustavo Henrique (yellow card) 48'; Marinho 60' (yellow card) 79'; Soteldo 65'; Diego Pituca 90'	Report	14' Orejuela; (yellow card) 63' Egídio; (yellow card) 66' Robinho	Stadium: Vila Belmiro; Attendance: 7,905; Referee: Leandro Vuaden

28 November 35	Fortaleza	2–1	Santos	Fortaleza
20:30 UTC-03:00	Felipe (yellow card) 27'; Edinho 50'; Osvaldo 65'; Juninho (yellow card) 75'	Report	(yellow card) 8' Eduardo Sasha; (yellow card) 31' (yellow-red card) 90+9' Pará; (yellow card) 35' González; (yellow card) 36' Luan Peres; (yellow card) 47' Lucas Veríssimo; (yellow card) 50' Sampaoli; (yellow card) 60' Evandro; (yellow card) 63' (yellow-red card) 90+8' Soteldo; 69' Sánchez; (yellow card) 90+1' Jean Mota	Stadium: Castelão; Attendance: 33,925; Referee: Diego Pombo Lopez

1 December 36	Santos	2–0	Chapecoense	Santos
19:00 UTC-03:00	Lucas Veríssimo 8'; Marinho (yellow card) 37'; Evandro 49' (yellow card) 53'; Alison (yellow card) 73'	Report	(yellow card) 38' Dalberto; (yellow card) 80' Caíque Sá; (yellow card) 83' Douglas; (yellow card) 89' Amaral	Stadium: Vila Belmiro; Attendance: 6,961; Referee: Marielson Alves Silva

4 December 37	Athletico Paranaense	1–0	Santos	Curitiba
19:00 UTC-03:00	Ruben 47'; Léo Pereira (yellow card) 73'; Márcio Azevedo (yellow card) 90+1'	Report	(yellow card) 34' (yellow-red card) 68' Luan Peres; (yellow card) 88' Gustavo Henrique; (yellow card) 88' Diego Pituca; (yellow card) 90+1' Marinho; (yellow card) 90+2' Sampaoli	Stadium: Arena da Baixada; Attendance: 29,746; Referee: Anderson Daronco

8 December 38	Santos	4–0	Flamengo	Santos
16:00 UTC-03:00	Sampaoli (yellow card) 14'; Marinho 15' (yellow card) 16'; Sánchez 23', 85' (yellow card) 86'; Eduardo Sasha 63'	Report	(yellow card) 20' Filipe Luís; (yellow card) 42' Gabriel; (yellow card) 90' Rodinei	Stadium: Vila Belmiro; Attendance: 13,310; Referee: Paulo Roberto Alves Júnior

=== Copa do Brasil ===
==== First stage ====
6 February Single match	Altos	1–7	Santos	Teresina
18:15 UTC-03:00	Luizão 6'; Renato Santos (yellow card) 57'	Report	12' Luiz Felipe; 25' González; 26' Alison; 29', 41' Sánchez; 73' Soteldo; 83' Diego Pituca	Stadium: Albertão; Attendance: 4,407; Referee: Jean Pierre Gonçalves Lima

==== Second stage ====
7 March Single match	Santos	4–0	América de Natal	São Paulo
21:30 UTC-03:00	Alison (yellow card) 2'; Gustavo Henrique (yellow card) 29'; González 35' (yellow card) 43'; Jean Mota 61'; Rodrygo 70'; Aguilar 84'	Report	(yellow card) 17' Adenilson; (yellow card) 28' (yellow-red card) 76' Alison; (yellow card) 38' Hiltinho	Stadium: Pacaembu; Attendance: 8,295; Referee: Daniel Nobre Bins

==== Third stage ====
4 April 1st leg	Atlético Goianiense	1–0	Santos	Goiânia
19:15 UTC-03:00	Moraes (yellow card) 62'; Lucas Rocha (yellow card) 69'; Jorginho 82'; Gilvan (yellow card) 82'	Report	(yellow card) 39' (yellow-red card) 52' Gustavo Henrique; (yellow card) 41' Cueva; (yellow card) 64' Soteldo	Stadium: Antônio Accioly; Attendance: 10,525; Referee: Paulo Roberto Alves Júnior

11 April 2nd leg	Santos	3–0 (3–1 agg.)	Atlético Goianiense	Santos
21:30 UTC-03:00	Sánchez 45', 85'; Rodrygo 47'; Cueva (red card) 90+3'	Report	(yellow card) 23' Gilvan; (yellow card) 36' Nicolas; (yellow card) 52' Jonathan; (yellow card) 70' Washington; (yellow card) 80' Jorginho; (yellow card) 90+2' Reginaldo	Stadium: Vila Belmiro; Attendance: 11,623; Referee: Rodrigo Carvalhaes de Miranda

==== Fourth stage ====
17 April 1st leg	Santos	2–0	Vasco da Gama	Santos
19:15 UTC-03:00	Rodrygo (yellow card) 39' (goal) 48'; Jean Mota 66'; Gustavo Henrique (yellow card) 81'	Report	(yellow card) 18' Willian Maranhão	Stadium: Vila Belmiro; Attendance: 8,659; Referee: Leandro Pedro Vuaden

24 April 2nd leg	Vasco da Gama	2–1 (2–3 agg.)	Santos	Rio de Janeiro
19:15 UTC-03:00	Raul 13'; Lucas Mineiro (yellow card) 22'; Ricardo Graça 39'; Cáceres (yellow card) 45+2'; Maxi López (yellow card) 90+9'	Report	(yellow card) 31' Alison; (yellow card) 40' Rodrygo; 54' Jorge; (yellow card) 90+2' Soteldo; (yellow card) 90+7' Éverson; (yellow card) 90+8' Yuri	Stadium: São Januário; Attendance: 8,859; Referee: Rafael Traci

==== Round of 16 ====
15 May 1st leg	Atlético Mineiro	0–0	Santos	Belo Horizonte
19:15 UTC-03:00	José Welison (yellow card) 30'; Elias (yellow card) 60'	Report		Stadium: Independência; Attendance: 11,176; Referee: Rodrigo D'Alonso Ferreira

6 June 2nd leg	Santos	1–2 (1–2 agg.)	Atlético Mineiro	São Paulo
20:00 UTC-03:00	Gustavo Henrique 6'; Lucas Veríssimo (yellow card) 70'; Jean Lucas (yellow card) 88'; Soteldo (yellow card) 90+4'	Report	37', 85' Chará; (yellow card) 48' José Welison; (yellow card) 66' Adílson; (yellow card) 72' Fábio Santos	Stadium: Pacaembu; Attendance: 16,857; Referee: Bruno Arleu de Araujo

=== Campeonato Paulista ===
==== Results summary ====
Overall								Home						Away					
Pld	W	D	L	GF	GA	GD	Pts	W	D	L	GF	GA	GD	W	D	L	GF	GA	GD
16	9	3	4	23	15	+8	30	7	0	1	13	3	+10	2	3	3	10	12	−2

Last updated: 9 April 2019.
Source: Globo Esporte

==== Group stage ====
Pos	Team	Pld	W	D	L	GF	GA	GD	Pts	Qualification or relegation
1	Red Bull Brasil	12	8	3	1	19	10	+9	27	Knockout stage
2	Santos	12	7	2	3	19	13	+6	23	Knockout stage
3	Ponte Preta	12	5	4	3	13	7	+6	19	
4	São Caetano (R)	12	1	5	6	12	21	−9	8	Relegation to Série A2

Source: Soccerway
(R) Relegated

==== Matches ====
19 January 1	Santos	1–0	Ferroviária	Santos
17:00 UTC-02:00	Diego Pituca (yellow card) 24'; Alison (yellow card) 65'; Jean Mota 78'; Felippe Cardoso (yellow card) 90+5'	Report	(yellow card) 45+2' Élton; (yellow card) 90' Rodrigão	Stadium: Vila Belmiro; Attendance: 8,616; Referee: Vinícius Gonçalves Dias Araújo

24 January 2	São Bento	0–4	Santos	Sorocaba
19:15 UTC-02:00		Report	1' Jean Mota; 19' González; (yellow card) 60' Diego Pituca; 70' Soteldo; 77' Copete	Stadium: Walter Ribeiro; Attendance: 8,619; Referee: Thiago Duarte Peixoto

27 January 3	Santos	2–0	São Paulo	São Paulo
17:00 UTC-02:00	González (yellow card) 41' (goal) 67'; Luiz Felipe 45' (yellow card) 54'; Diego Pituca (yellow card) 66'; Copete (yellow card) 85'; Sánchez (yellow card) 86'; Felippe Cardoso (yellow card) 90+3'	Report	(yellow card) 39' Hudson; (yellow card) 41' Reinaldo; (yellow card) 73' Arboleda; (yellow card) 90+2' Bruno Alves	Stadium: Pacaembu; Attendance: 20,239; Referee: Vinícius Furlan

31 January 4	Bragantino	1–4	Santos	Bragança Paulista
19:15 UTC-02:00	Léo (yellow card) 23'; Wesley 63'; Matheus Peixoto (yellow card) 74'	Report	37', 55' (pen.) Sánchez; 45' González; 45+3' Jean Mota; (yellow card) 50' Gustavo Henrique	Stadium: Nabi Abi Chedid; Attendance: 5,862; Referee: Lucas Canetto Bellote

3 February 5	Ituano	5–1	Santos	Itu
19:00 UTC-02:00	Morato 8', 45+2'; Marcos Serrato 9'; Jonas 20'; Martinelli (yellow card) 22'; Léo 64'; Paulinho Dias (yellow card) 80'	Report	(yellow card) 19' González; (yellow card) 34' Alison; 42' Jean Mota; (yellow card) 74' Luiz Felipe	Stadium: Novelli Júnior; Attendance: 5,673; Referee: Raphael Claus

9 February 6	Santos	1–0	Mirassol	São Paulo
17:00 UTC-02:00	Aguilar (yellow card) 73'; Jean Mota 90+5'	Report	(yellow card) 46' Lelê; (yellow card) 70' Riccieli	Stadium: Pacaembu; Attendance: 19,261; Referee: Douglas Marques das Flores

18 February 7	Santos	3–0	Guarani	São Paulo
20:00 UTC-03:00	Alison (yellow card) 23'; Jean Mota 38', 81'; Rodrygo 90'	Report	(yellow card) 80' Victor Ramos; (yellow card) 90+2' Carlinhos	Stadium: Pacaembu; Attendance: 14,708; Referee: Rodrigo Guarizo do Amaral

23 February 8	Palmeiras	0–0	Santos	São Paulo
19:00 UTC-03:00	Weverton (yellow card) 32'; Antônio Carlos (yellow card) 39'	Report	(yellow card) 36' Jean Lucas; (yellow card) 45' Yuri; (yellow card) 63' Cueva	Stadium: Allianz Parque; Attendance: 33,980; Referee: Flavio Rodrigues de Souza

2 March 9	Santos	3–2	Oeste	São Paulo
19:00 UTC-03:00	Betinho 42' (o.g.); González 62'; Aguilar (yellow card) 88'; Rodrygo (yellow card) 89'; Victor Ferraz 90+6'	Report	15' (yellow card) 40' Bruno Lopes; 43' (yellow card) 70' Matheus Jesus; (yellow card) 79' Kanu; (yellow card) 90+2' Alyson; (yellow card) 90+4' Roberto	Stadium: Pacaembu; Attendance: 9,486; Referee: Thiago Duarte Peixoto

10 March 10	Corinthians	0–0	Santos	São Paulo
16:00 UTC-03:00	Fagner (yellow card) 33'	Report	(yellow card) 5' Alison; (yellow card) 90' Matheus Ribeiro; (yellow card) 90+2' González	Stadium: Arena Corinthians; Attendance: 41,737; Referee: Douglas Marques das Flores

15 March 11	Santos	0–1	Novorizontino	São Paulo
20:30 UTC-03:00	Diego Pituca (yellow card) 88'	Report	(yellow card) 30' Adilson Goiano; 31' Murilo; (yellow card) 45+1' Jean Patrick; (yellow card) 83' Matheus Sales	Stadium: Pacaembu; Attendance: 10,079; Referee: Salim Fende Chavez

20 March 12	Botafogo–SP	4–0	Santos	Ribeirão Preto
21:30 UTC-03:00	Rafael Costa 1', 49', 87'; Plínio 19'; Pará (yellow card) 57'	Report	(yellow card) 41' Matheus Ribeiro; (yellow card) 52' (yellow-red card) 77' Lucas Veríssimo	Stadium: Santa Cruz; Attendance: 6,029; Referee: Raphael Claus

==== Knockout stage ====
===== Quarter-final =====
23 March 1st Leg	Santos	2–0	Red Bull Brasil	São Paulo
19:30 UTC-03:00	Sánchez 11' (yellow card) 48'; Diego Pituca 79' (yellow card) 80'; Victor Ferraz (yellow card) 86'	Report	(yellow card) 45' Rafael Carioca; (yellow card) 45+2' Ligger; (yellow card) 47' Osman; (yellow card) 60' Jobson	Stadium: Pacaembu; Attendance: 20,615; Referee: Douglas Marques das Flores

26 March 2nd Leg	Red Bull Brasil	0–0 (0–2 agg.)	Santos	Campinas
20:00 UTC-03:00	Jobson (yellow card) 12'; Osman (yellow card) 30'; Ytalo (yellow card) 65'; Ligger (yellow card) 87'	Report	(yellow card) 36' Eduardo Sasha	Stadium: Estádio Moisés Lucarelli; Attendance: 9,396; Referee: Leandro Bizzio Marinho

===== Semi-final =====
31 March 1st Leg	Corinthians	2–1	Santos	São Paulo
16:00 UTC-03:00	Manoel 4'; Clayson 32'; Sornoza (yellow card) 45'	Report	8' Derlis González; (yellow card) 13' Vanderlei; (yellow card) 68' Alison	Stadium: Arena Corinthians; Attendance: 39,919; Referee: Vinícius Gonçalves Dias Araújo

8 April 2nd Leg	Santos	1–0 (2–2 agg.) (6–7 p)	Corinthians	São Paulo
20:00 UTC-03:00	Alison (yellow card) 1'; Diego Pituca (yellow card) 32'; Sánchez (yellow card) 64'; Gustavo Henrique 86'; Kaio Jorge (yellow card) 90+6'	Report	(yellow card) 44' Clayson; (yellow card) 80' Cássio	Stadium: Pacaembu; Attendance: 38,542; Referee: Raphael Claus
	Penalties
	Rodrygo (penalty scored); Kaio Jorge (penalty missed); Soteldo (penalty scored); Sánchez (penalty scored); González (penalty scored); Diego Pituca (penalty scored); Alison (penalty scored); Victor Ferraz (penalty missed)		(penalty missed) Boselli; (penalty scored) Vágner Love; (penalty scored) Ramiro; (penalty scored) Júnior Urso; (penalty scored) Fagner; (penalty scored) Sornoza; (penalty scored) Danilo Avelar; (penalty scored) Henrique

=== Copa Sudamericana ===
==== First stage ====
12 February 1st Leg	River Plate (Uruguay)	0–0	(Brazil) Santos	Montevideo, Uruguay
18:15 UTC-03:00	Leyes (yellow card) 78'	Report	(red card) 66' Orinho; (yellow card) 90+3' González	Stadium: Luis Franzini; Referee: (Argentina) Germán Delfino

26 February 2nd Leg	Santos (Brazil)	1–1 (1–1 agg.)	(Uruguay) River Plate	São Paulo
19:15 UTC-03:00	Felippe Cardoso (yellow card) 78'; Yuri (yellow card) 80'; Soteldo 87'	Report	(yellow card) 54' Calzada; 55' Da Luz; (yellow card) 81' Silva; (yellow card) 88' Olivera	Stadium: Pacaembu; Attendance: 0 Referee: (Argentina) Mauro Vigliano
