= Luiz Felipe (footballer, born 1993) =

Brazilian footballer

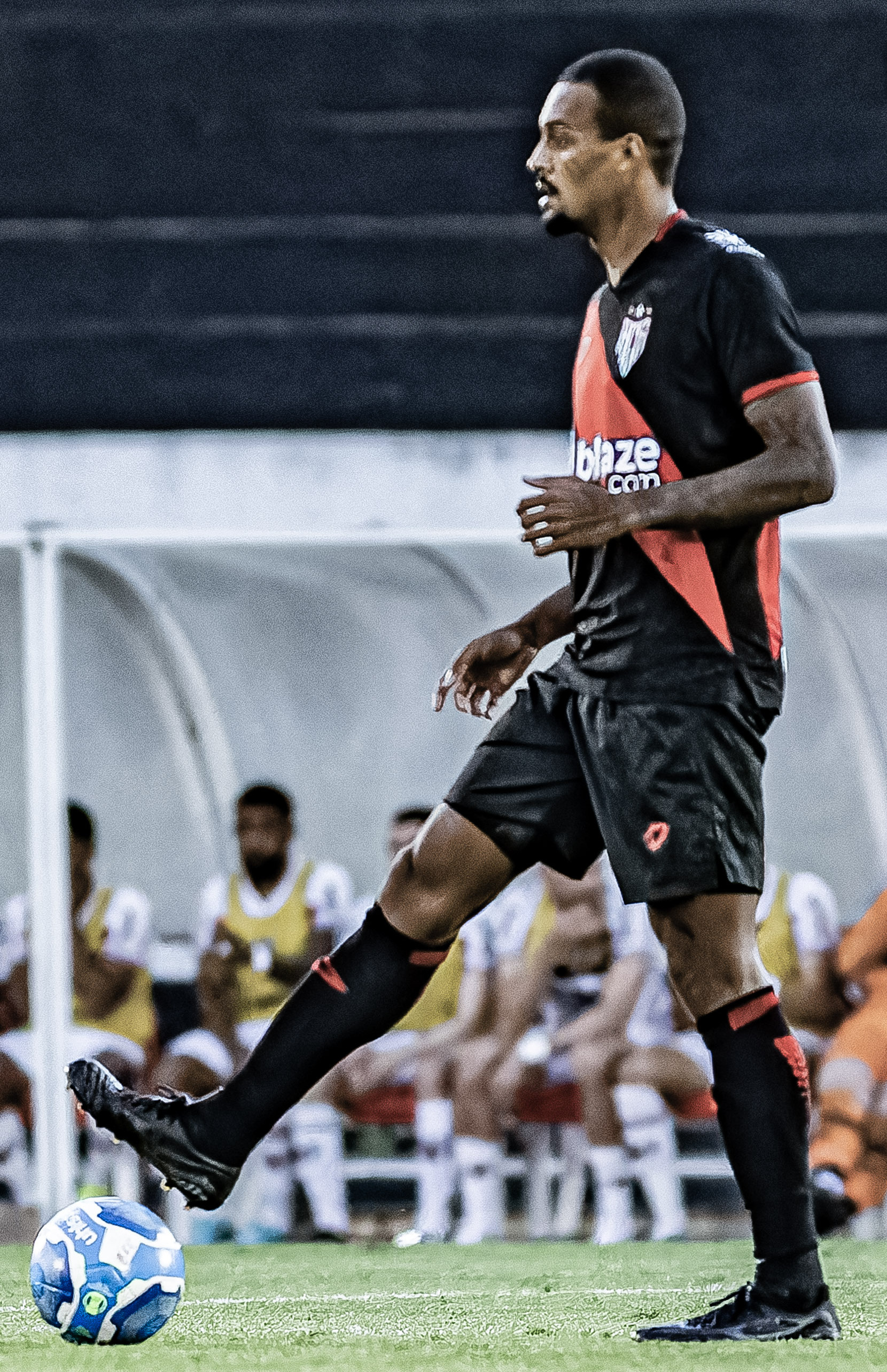
- Luiz Felipe playing for Atlético Goianiense in 2023

Personal information
- Full name: Luiz Felipe do Nascimento dos Santos
- Date of birth: 9 October 1993 (age 33)
- Place of birth: Tubarão, Brazil
- Height: 1.87 m (6 ft 2 in)
- Position: Centre back

Team information
- Current team: Goiás
- Number: 3

Youth career
- Joinville
- 2011–2012: Caxias

Senior career*
Years	Team	Apps	(Gls)
2012–2014	Caxias	17	(0)
2014	→ Duque de Caxias (loan)	5	(0)
2014	→ FC Cascavel (loan)	7	(0)
2015–2016	Paraná	41	(2)
2016–2025	Santos	136	(3)
2023–2024	→ Atlético Goianiense (loan)	34	(2)
2025	→ Goiás (loan)	18	(2)
2026–	Goiás	36	(1)
- * Club domestic league appearances and goals as of 17 November 2026

Luiz Felipe do Nascimento dos Santos (born 9 September 1993), known as simply Luiz Felipe (Brazilian Portuguese pronunciation: [luˈis feˈlipi, - fiˈ-]), is a Brazilian footballer who plays as a central defender for Goiás.

== Career ==
=== Early career ===
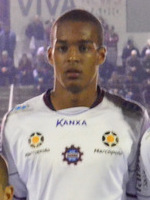
Luiz Felipe with Caxias in 2013

Luiz Felipe was born in Tubarão, Santa Catarina. A Joinville youth graduate, he joined Caxias in 2011, and made his first team debut on 5 October 2012 by starting in a 1–0 Série C away win against Vila Nova.

On 14 January 2014 Luiz Felipe was loaned to Duque de Caxias, for five months. After serving another subsequent loan at FC Cascavel, he was released.

=== Paraná ===
On 3 February 2015 Luiz Felipe signed for Paraná, in Série B. He made his professional debut on 8 May, coming on as a late substitute in a 1–0 home win against Ceará.

On 27 January 2016, after appearing in 28 matches, Luis Felipe renewed his contract until the end of 2017. Two days later he scored his first senior goals, netting a brace in a 4–1 Campeonato Paranaense home routing of J. Malucelli.

=== Santos ===
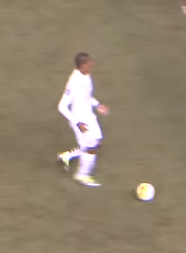
Luiz Felipe playing for Santos in 2016

On 17 February 2016, Santos reached an agreement with Paraná for the transfer of Luiz Felipe, with Peixe paying R$ 1 million for 55% of his federative rights. Two days later, he signed a four-year contract with his new club.

Luiz Felipe made his debut for Peixe on 5 March 2016, coming on as a second-half substitute for injured Lucas Veríssimo in a 2–0 home win against rivals Corinthians. He scored his first goal for the club on 28 April, netting the first in a 3–0 Copa do Brasil success against Santos-AP also at the Vila Belmiro.

Luiz Felipe made his Série A debut on 25 May 2016, replacing Joel in a 2–2 away draw against Figueirense as Gustavo Henrique was sent off. He subsequently established himself as a starter, overtaking David Braz and partnering Gustavo, as his club went on to achieve one of the best defensive records during the first half of the campaign.

On 29 October 2016, Luiz Felipe suffered a knee injury in a 1–0 home win against Palmeiras, being sidelined for seven months. He returned to action on 10 September of the following year, replacing injured Gustavo in a 2–0 home win against rivals Corinthians.

On 10 October 2017, Luiz Felipe extended his contract until 2022. A backup to Braz and Veríssimo, he made his Copa Libertadores debut on 1 May of the following year, playing the full 90 minutes in a 1–0 away loss against Nacional as the latter was suspended.

Luiz Felipe spent the 2019 season as a backup to Gustavo and Veríssimo, facing fierce competition from new signings Felipe Aguilar and Luan Peres. On 10 January 2020, he renewed his contract with the club until December 2024.

==== Loan to Atlético Goianiense ====
On 1 August 2023, Luiz Felipe was loaned to Atlético Goianiense in the second division until the end of the year. On 18 January of the following year, Atlético's president announced his return to the club on a one-year loan deal.

=== Goiás ===
On 30 December 2024, after Atlético's relegation, Luiz Felipe moved to cross-town rivals Goiás also in a temporary deal.

== Career statistics ==
As of 16 December 2025

Club	Season	League			State League		Cup		Continental		Other		Total	
Club	Season	Division	Apps	Goals	Apps	Goals	Apps	Goals	Apps	Goals	Apps	Goals	Apps	Goals
Caxias	2012	Série C	1	0	0	0	—		—		8 (Note: Appearance(s) in Copa FGF)	0	9	0
Caxias	2013	Série C	4	0	12	0	2	0	—		—		18	0
Caxias	Total		5	0	12	0	2	0	—		8	0	27	0
Duque de Caxias (loan)	2014	Série C	0	0	5	0	1	0	—		—		6	0
FC Cascavel (loan)	2014	Paranaense Série Prata	—		7	0	—		—		—		7	0
Paraná	2015	Série B	28	0	10	0	1	0	—		—		39	0
Paraná	2016	Série B	0	0	3	2	0	0	—		—		3	2
Paraná	Total		28	0	13	2	1	0	—		—		42	2
Santos	2016	Série A	26	1	2	0	9	1	—		—		37	2
Santos	2017	Série A	8	0	—		—		—		—		8	0
Santos	2018	Série A	13	0	6	0	2	0	1 (Note: Appearance(s) in Copa Libertadores)	0	—		22	0
Santos	2019	Série A	8	0	10	1	2	1	0	0	—		20	2
Santos	2020	Série A	13	0	7	0	1	0	3	0	—		24	0
Santos	2021	Série A	23	0	4	0	3	0	5 (Note: One appearance in Copa Libertadores, four appearances in Copa Sudamericana)	0	—		35	0
Santos	2022	Série A	13	1	2	0	1	0	2 (Note: Appearance(s) in Copa Sudamericana)	0	—		18	1
Santos	2023	Série A	1	0	0	0	0	0	2	0	—		3	0
Santos	Total		105	2	31	1	18	2	13	0	—		167	5
Atlético Goianiense (loan)	2023	Série B	16	1	—		—		—		—		16	1
Atlético Goianiense (loan)	2024	Série A	16	1	2	0	1	0	—		—		19	1
Atlético Goianiense (loan)	Total		32	2	2	0	1	0	—		—		35	2
Goiás (loan)	2025	Série B	11	0	7	2	0	0	—		1 (Note: Appearance(s) in Copa Verde)	0	19	2
Career total			181	4	78	5	23	2	13	0	9	0	303	11

== Honours ==
FC Cascavel

- Campeonato Paranaense Série Prata: 2014

Santos

- Campeonato Paulista: 2016

Atlético Goianiense

- Campeonato Goiano: 2024
