= Felipe Aguilar (footballer) =

Colombian footballer (born 1993)

Personal information
- Full name: Felipe Aguilar Mendoza
- Date of birth: 20 January 1993 (age 33)
- Place of birth: Medellín, Colombia
- Height: 1.91 m (6 ft 3 in)
- Position: Centre-back

Team information
- Current team: Central Córdoba SdE
- Number: 21

Youth career
- 2000–2005: Alianza Bernal
- 2005–2013: Atlético Nacional

Senior career*
Years	Team	Apps	(Gls)
2011–2018	Atlético Nacional	67	(0)
2013–2015	→ Alianza Petrolera (loan)	66	(0)
2019–2020	Santos	30	(0)
2020–2024	Athletico Paranaense	18	(1)
2021–2022	→ Atlético Nacional (loan)	23	(0)
2022–2023	→ Lanús (loan)	20	(0)
2023–2024	→ Independiente (loan)	18	(0)
2025	Águilas Doradas	6	(0)
2025–2026	Deportivo Cali	27	(2)
2026–	Central Córdoba SdE	2	(0)

International career^{‡}
2013	Colombia U20	11	(1)
2015–2016	Colombia Olympic	3	(0)
2016–	Colombia	3	(0)
Medal record
Colombia
Copa América Centenario
Bronze medal – third place	2016 United States
- * Club domestic league appearances and goals as of 17:23, 12 November 2026 (UTC) ‡ National team caps and goals as of 25 January 2017

Felipe Aguilar Mendoza (born 20 January 1993) is a Colombian professional footballer who plays as a centre-back for Central Córdoba SdE.

== Club career ==
=== Atlético Nacional ===
Aguilar was born in Medellín, and joined Atlético Nacional's youth setup at the age of 12. On 23 March 2011, while still a youth, he made his first team debut by starting in a 2–0 away loss against Deportivo Rionegro, for the year's Copa Colombia.

In January 2013, after finishing his formation, Aguilar moved to fellow Categoría Primera A side Alianza Petrolera on loan. He made his professional debut on 16 February, starting in a 4–0 away loss against his parent club.

Aguilar scored his first professional goal on 10 April 2013, his team's third in a 4–0 away rout of Cúcuta Deportivo, for the national cup. He then became a regular starter at Alianza before returning to Nacional in January 2016. Initially a backup to Alexis Henríquez and Davinson Sánchez, he became a regular starter after Sánchez's departure to Ajax.

=== Santos ===
On 15 January 2019, Atlético Nacional announced that they had accepted an offer from Santos for Aguilar. Three days later, he was officially announced as the club's second signing of the season, after agreeing to a four-year contract.

Aguilar made his debut for the club on 27 January 2019, replacing Jean Mota in a 2–0 Campeonato Paulista home win against São Paulo. His first goal abroad came on 7 March, as he scored the last in a 4–0 home win over América-RN, for the year's Copa do Brasil.

Initially a first-choice, Aguilar was demoted to fourth-choice in September 2019 (behind Gustavo Henrique, Lucas Veríssimo and new signing Luan Peres), mainly due to individual errors.

=== Athletico Paranaense ===
On 18 March 2020, Aguilar agreed to a four-year contract with fellow top-tier side Athletico Paranaense, for a rumoured fee of R$ 10 million for 50% of his federative rights.

In June 2021, Aguilar returned to Colombia to join Atlético Nacional on a one-year loan, with an option to join them permanently.

On 1 July 2022, Aguilar joined Argentine Primera División club Lanús on a one-year loan. In August 2023, he switched sides and joined Independiente on a 1.5 year loan, after his parent club indicated that he was not part of their plans for the current season.

== International career ==
Aguilar represented Colombia at under-20 level in the 2013 South American Youth Football Championship and the 2013 FIFA U-20 World Cup. On 23 May 2016, he was included in José Pékerman's 23-man list for the Copa América Centenario.

Aguilar made his full international debut on 11 June 2016, starting in a 3–2 loss against Costa Rica at the NRG Stadium in Houston. In that year, he also represented the under-23s, being initially named for the 2016 Summer Olympics but being cut from the final squad due to injury.

== Career statistics ==
=== Club ===
As of 15 March 2024

Club	Season	League			Cup		Continental		State League		Other		Total	
Club	Season	Division	Apps	Goals	Apps	Goals	Apps	Goals	Apps	Goals	Apps	Goals	Apps	Goals
Atlético Nacional	2011	Categoría Primera A	0	0	2	0	—		—		—		2	0
Atlético Nacional	2016	Categoría Primera A	15	0	2	0	12 (Note: Six appearances in Copa Libertadores, six appearances in Copa Sudamericana)	0	—		2 (Note: Appearance(s) in FIFA Club World Cup)	0	31	0
Atlético Nacional	2017	Categoría Primera A	23	0	2	0	0	0	—		1 (Note: Appearance(s) in Recopa Sudamericana)	0	26	0
Atlético Nacional	2018	Categoría Primera A	29	0	6	0	6 (Note: Appearance(s) in Copa Libertadores)	0	—		0	0	41	0
Atlético Nacional	Total		67	0	12	0	18	0	—		3	0	100	0
Alianza Petrolera (loan)	2013	Categoría Primera A	13	0	7	3	—		—		—		20	3
Alianza Petrolera (loan)	2014	Categoría Primera A	28	0	4	1	—		—		—		32	1
Alianza Petrolera (loan)	2015	Categoría Primera A	25	0	0	0	—		—		—		25	0
Alianza Petrolera (loan)	Total		66	0	11	4	—		—		—		77	4
Santos	2019	Série A	17	0	7	1	2 (Note: Appearance(s) in Copa Sudamericana)	0	13 (Note: Appearance(s) in Campeonato Paulista)	0	—		39	1
Santos	2020	Série A	0	0	0	0	0	0	0	0	—		0	0
Santos	Total		17	0	7	1	2	0	13	0	—		39	1
Athletico Paranaense	2020	Série A	11	0	1	0	3	0	0	0	—		15	0
Athletico Paranaense	2021	Série A	0	0	0	0	0	0	7	1	—		7	1
Athletico Paranaense	Total		11	0	1	0	3	0	7	1	—		22	1
Atlético Nacional (loan)	2021	Categoría Primera A	13	0	3	0	—		—		—		16	0
Atlético Nacional (loan)	2022	Categoría Primera A	10	0	0	0	2	0	—		—		12	0
Atlético Nacional (loan)	Total		23	0	3	0	2	0	—		—		28	0
Lanús (loan)	2022	Argentine Primera División	5	0	0	0	0	0	—		—		5	0
Lanús (loan)	2023	Argentine Primera División	15	0	0	0	0	0	—		—		15	0
Lanús (loan)	Total		20	0	0	0	0	0	—		—		20	0
Independiente (loan)	2023	Argentine Primera División	9	0	0	0	0	0	—		—		9	0
Independiente (loan)	2024	Argentine Primera División	8	0	0	0	—		—		—		8	0
Independiente (loan)	Total		17	0	0	0	0	0	0	0	0	0	17	0
Career total			230	1	34	5	29	0	20	1	3	0	310	7

=== International ===
As of 15 January 2019.

Colombia
Year	Apps	Goals
2016	2	0
2017	1	0
Total	3	0

== Honours ==
=== Club ===
Atlético Nacional

- Superliga Colombiana: 2016
- Copa Libertadores: 2016
- Recopa Sudamericana: 2017

=== International ===
Colombia U20

- South American Youth Football Championship: 2013

Colombia

- Copa América: Third place 2016
