= Tailson (footballer, born 1999) =

Brazilian footballer

Personal information
- Full name: Tailson Pinto Gonçalves
- Date of birth: 5 March 1999 (age 27)
- Place of birth: Santo André, Brazil
- Height: 1.77 m (5 ft 10 in)
- Position: Forward

Team information
- Current team: PT Prachuap
- Number: 21

Youth career
- 2008–2013: Santos
- 2014: Mauaense
- 2015–2019: Santos

Senior career*
Years	Team	Apps	(Gls)
2019–2024	Santos	36	(1)
2021	→ Coritiba (loan)	8	(0)
2021	→ Náutico (loan)	7	(0)
2023	→ Ferroviária (loan)	2	(0)
2023–2024	→ Retrô (loan)	13	(1)
2024–2025	Politehnica Iași	36	(3)
2025–2026	Botev Plovdiv	12	(0)
2026	→ Spartak Varna (loan)	14	(0)
2026–	PT Prachuap	2	(0)
- * Club domestic league appearances and goals as of 13 October 2026

Tailson Pinto Gonçalves (born 5 March 1999), simply known as Tailson (Brazilian Portuguese: [tɐˈiwsun]), is a Brazilian professional footballer who plays as a forward or an attacking midfielder for Thai League 1 club PT Prachuap.

== Club career ==
=== Santos ===
Born in Santo André, São Paulo, Tailson joined Santos' youth setup at the age of nine; in 2014 he left to join Mauaense, but returned to the club in 2015. After appearing in the 2019 Copa São Paulo de Futebol Júnior, he was called up to the first team by manager Jorge Sampaoli.

On 19 April 2019, Tailson left the club after his contract expired. On 5 August, however, after being linked to FC Barcelona, he signed a professional deal with the club.

Tailson made his first team – and Série A – debut on 5 October 2019, starting and scoring the winner in a 1–0 away defeat of Vasco da Gama.

==== Loans ====
On 12 March 2021, Tailson joined recently relegated side Coritiba on loan for the 2021 campaign. He struggled to make an impact during his spell at the club, and was sent back to his parent club in July.

On 9 August 2021, Tailson moved to Náutico also in the second division, on loan until December. He returned to Santos for the 2022 season, but featured rarely.

On 1 February 2023, Tailson was loaned to Ferroviária until July. On 9 June, he moved to fellow Série D team Retrô also in a temporary deal. His loan was renewed for the Campeonato Pernambucano on 10 January 2024.

On 7 June 2024, Tailson rescinded his contract with Santos one month before its expiration.

=== Politehnica Iași ===
In July 2024, Tailson signed a contract with Romanian club Politehnica Iași.

== Career statistics ==
As of 1 June 2025

Appearances and goals by club, season and competition
Club	Season	League			State league (Note: Includes Campeonato Paulista, Campeonato Paranaense, Campeonato Pernambucano)		National cup (Note: Includes Copa do Brasil, Cupa României)		Continental		Other		Total	
Club	Season	Division	Apps	Goals	Apps	Goals	Apps	Goals	Apps	Goals	Apps	Goals	Apps	Goals
Santos	2019	Série A	11	1	—		0	0	—		—		11	1
Santos	2020	Série A	13	0	5	0	1	0	0	0	—		19	0
Santos	2021	Série A	0	0	2	0	0	0	0	0	—		2	0
Santos	2022	Série A	3	0	2	0	0	0	—		—		5	0
Santos	Total		27	1	9	0	1	0	0	0	—		37	1
Coritiba (loan)	2021	Série B	2	0	6	0	2	0	—		—		10	0
Náutico (loan)	2021	Série B	7	0	—		—		—		—		7	0
Ferroviária (loan)	2023	Série D	0	0	2	0	—		—		—		2	0
Retrô (loan)	2023	Série D	10	1	—		—		—		—		10	1
Retrô (loan)	2024	Série D	0	0	3	0	0	0	—		1 (Note: Appearance in Copa do Nordeste)	0	4	0
Retrô (loan)	Total		10	1	3	0	0	0	—		1	0	14	1
Politehnica Iași	2024–25	Liga I	34	3	—		3	0	—		2 (Note: Appearances in Liga I promotion/relegation play-offs)	0	39	3
Career total			80	5	20	0	6	0	0	0	3	0	109	5

== Honours ==
Santos

- Copa Libertadores runner-up: 2020
