= Diego Pituca =

Brazilian footballer (born 1992)

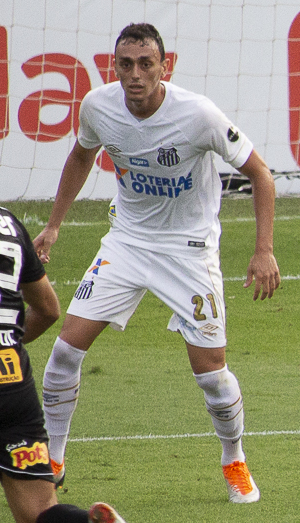
- Diego Pituca playing for Santos in 2018

Personal information
- Full name: Diego Cristiano Evaristo
- Date of birth: 1 August 1992 (age 34)
- Place of birth: Mogi Guaçu, Brazil
- Height: 1.78 m (5 ft 10 in)
- Position: Defensive midfielder

Team information
- Current team: V-Varen Nagasaki
- Number: 21

Youth career
- 2002–2009: Guaçuano
- 2009–2010: Itapirense

Senior career*
Years	Team	Apps	(Gls)
2011	Mineiros	0	(0)
2011	Brasilis	15	(0)
2012–2013	Guaçuano	39	(6)
2013–2015	Matonense	65	(6)
2014	→ União São João (loan)	13	(3)
2015	→ Botafogo-SP (loan)	12	(0)
2016–2017	Botafogo-SP	48	(3)
2017–2021	Santos	123	(6)
2021–2023	Kashima Antlers	85	(6)
2024–2025	Santos	73	(6)
2025–	V-Varen Nagasaki	31	(0)
- * Club domestic league appearances and goals as of 11 August 2026

Diego Cristiano Evaristo (born 1 August 1992), known as Diego Pituca or simply Pituca, is a Brazilian footballer who plays for J1 League club V-Varen Nagasaki. Mainly a defensive midfielder, he can also play as a left-back.

== Club career ==
=== Early career ===
Pituca was born in Mogi Guaçu, São Paulo, and mainly represented Guaçuano and Itapirense as a youth. In 2011 he joined Mineiros, but failed to appear for the side during his spell.

In 2011 Pituca returned to his native state, after agreeing to a contract with Brasilis. He made his debut for the club on 7 May of that year by starting in a 1–0 Campeonato Paulista Segunda Divisão away loss against his first club Guaçuano, and played his first campaign as a left back.

On 11 January 2012, after being a regular starter for Brasilis, Pituca moved back to Mandi. He only scored his first senior goal on 3 March of the following year, in a 2–2 home draw against Sertãozinho; thirteen days later, however, he netted a brace in a 4–1 home routing of Marília.

After two seasons as a starter, Pituca joined Matonense in April 2013. On 28 May 2014, he was loaned to União São João until the end of the year's Paulistão Segunda Divisão.

=== Botafogo-SP ===
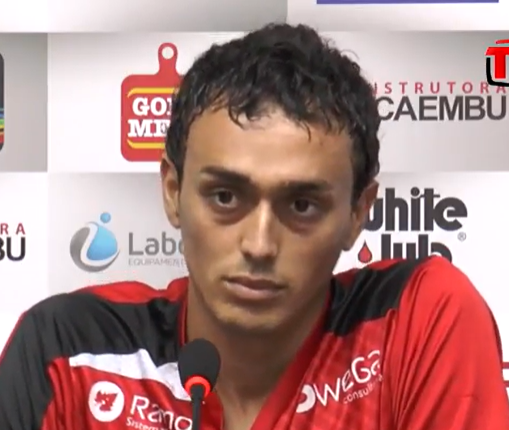
Pituca during an interview with Botafogo-SP in 2017

Upon returning to Matonense, Pituca impressed enough for the side to secure a loan deal to Botafogo-SP on 19 May 2015, despite being relegated with his previous club. He immediately became a starter at the side, helping in their Campeonato Brasileiro Série D winning campaign.

Pituca signed a permanent deal with Bota for the 2016 season, and remained a mainstay afterwards. On 17 November of that year, he renewed his contract until the end of 2018.

=== Santos ===
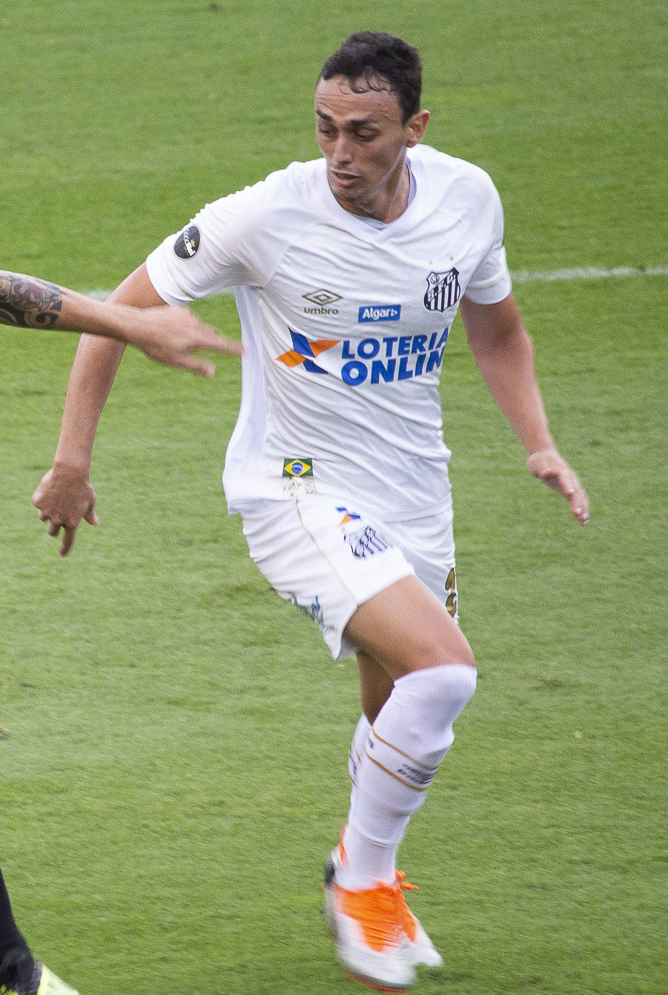
Pituca representing Santos in 2018

On 29 May 2017 Pituca joined Santos, being initially assigned to the B-team. The following 24 January, he was promoted to the first team by new manager Jair Ventura.

Pituca made his first team – and Série A – debut on 14 April 2018, replacing Jean Mota in a 2–0 home win against Ceará. He made his Copa Libertadores debut on 24 May, starting in a 0–0 home draw against Real Garcilaso.

Pituca scored his first senior goal for Peixe on 23 September 2018, netting the opener in a 1–1 home draw against Vasco da Gama. Under new manager Cuca, he became an undisputed starter and finished the campaign with 34 league appearances.

On 3 May 2019, Pituca renewed his contract until April 2023. He remained a regular under subsequent managers Jorge Sampaoli and Jesualdo Ferreira, playing in a more advanced midfield role with the latter.

On 10 November 2020, it was announced that Pituca and a further six first team players tested positive for COVID-19.

=== Kashima Antlers ===
On 15 January 2021, Santos president Andrés Rueda announced the sale of Pituca to Japanese club Kashima Antlers. Antlers confirmed the transfer six days later, with Pituca joining the club after the 2020 Copa Libertadores Final.

Despite the J1 League season beginning in February, due to the COVID-19 pandemic Pituca was only allowed to enter Japan on April 2 and had to isolate for 14 days on arrival. He eventually made his debut in the J.League Cup, coming on as a substitute in a 2–2 draw with Sagan Tosu. He scored his first goal for Kashima in a 4-0 J1 League win over Consadole Sapporo. He went on to make 37 appearances across all competitions in his debut season, scoring 2 goals.

=== Santos return ===
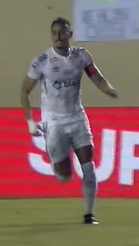
Pituca in action for Santos in 2024

On 20 July 2023, Santos announced an agreement with Pituca for a four-year contract, effective on 1 January 2024, after his contract with Kashima expired. On 31 December, Santos confirmed his return.

Pituca was a regular starter for the club in the 2024 Campeonato Paulista, being named in the best XI of the competition. On 6 August 2025, he rescinded his link with the club.

=== V-Varen Nagasaki ===
On 8 August 2025, Pituca returned to Japan after being announced at V-Varen Nagasaki in the second division.

== Career statistics ==
=== Club ===
As of 25 October 2025.

Club	Season	League			State League		Cup		League Cup		Continental		Other		Total	
Club	Season	Division	Apps	Goals	Apps	Goals	Apps	Goals	Apps	Goals	Apps	Goals	Apps	Goals	Apps	Goals
Mineiros	2011	Goiano 2ª Divisão	—		0	0	—		—		—		—		0	0
Brasilis	2011	Paulista 2ª Divisão	—		15	0	—		—		—		—		15	0
Guaçuano	2012	Paulista A3	—		22	0	—		—		—		11 (Note: Appearance(s) in Copa Paulista)	0	33	0
Guaçuano	2013	Paulista A3	—		17	6	—		—		—		—		17	6
Guaçuano	Total		—		39	6	—		—		—		11	0	50	6
Matonense	2013	Paulista 2ª Divisão	—		26	3	—		—		—		—		26	3
Matonense	2014	Paulista A3	—		22	3	—		—		—		—		22	3
Matonense	2015	Paulista A2	—		17	0	—		—		—		—		17	0
Matonense	Total		—		65	6	—		—		—		—		65	6
União São João (loan)	2014	Paulista 2ª Divisão	—		13	3	—		—		—		—		13	3
Botafogo–SP	2015	Série D	12	0	—		—		—		—		—		12	0
Botafogo–SP	2016	Série C	19	0	14	3	—		—		—		—		33	3
Botafogo–SP	2017	Série C	2	0	13	0	—		—		—		—		15	0
Botafogo–SP	Total		33	0	27	3	—		—		—		—		60	3
Santos	2017	Série A	—		—		—		—		—		17	3	17	3
Santos	2018	Série A	34	1	—		3	0	—		3 (Note: Appearance(s) in Copa Libertadores)	0	—		40	1
Santos	2019	Série A	35	2	14	1	7	1	—		2 (Note: Appearance(s) in Copa Sudamericana)	0	—		58	4
Santos	2020	Série A	27	1	13	1	2	0	—		12	1	—		54	3
Santos	Total		96	4	27	2	12	1	—		17	1	17	3	169	11
Kashima Antlers	2021	J1 League	26	2	—		4	0	7	0	—		—		37	2
Kashima Antlers	2022	J1 League	28	1	—		4	1	3	1	—		—		35	3
Kashima Antlers	2023	J1 League	31	3	—		1	0	5	0	—		—		37	3
Kashima Antlers	Total		85	6	—		9	1	15	1	—		—		109	8
Santos	2024	Série B	36	4	15	1	—		—		—		—		51	5
Santos	2025	Série A	10	1	12	0	1	0	—		—		—		23	1
Santos	Total		46	5	27	1	1	0	—		—		—		74	6
V-Varen Nagasaki	2025	J2 League	9	0	—		—		—		—		—		9	0
Career total			269	15	213	21	22	2	15	1	17	1	28	3	564	43

== Honours ==
=== Club ===
Matonense

- Campeonato Paulista Segunda Divisão: 2013

Botafogo-SP

- Campeonato Brasileiro Série D: 2015

=== Individual ===
- Campeonato Paulista Team of the Year: 2019, 2024
