= Lucas Veríssimo =

Brazilian footballer

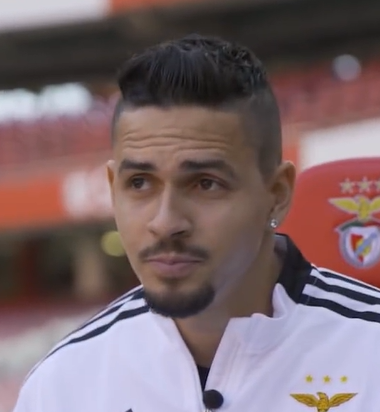
- Veríssimo in 2022

Personal information
- Full name: Lucas Veríssimo da Silva
- Date of birth: 7 July 1995 (age 31)
- Place of birth: Jundiaí, Brazil
- Height: 1.88 m (6 ft 2 in)
- Position: Centre-back

Team information
- Current team: Santos
- Number: 4

Youth career
- 2011: José Bonifácio
- 2012–2013: Linense
- 2013–2015: Santos

Senior career*
Years	Team	Apps	(Gls)
2016–2021	Santos	144	(4)
2021–2024	Benfica	26	(5)
2022	Benfica B	2	(0)
2023–2024	→ Corinthians (loan)	15	(1)
2024–2026	Al-Duhail	31	(3)
2025–2026	→ Al-Wakrah (loan)	14	(0)
2026–	Santos	19	(0)

International career^{‡}
2021	Brazil	2	(0)
- * Club domestic league appearances and goals as of 01:01, 19 October 2026 (UTC) ‡ National team caps and goals as of 20:18, 25 January 2024 (UTC)

Lucas Veríssimo da Silva (born 7 July 1995), known as Lucas Veríssimo, is a Brazilian professional footballer who plays as a centre-back for Santos.

== Club career ==
=== Santos ===
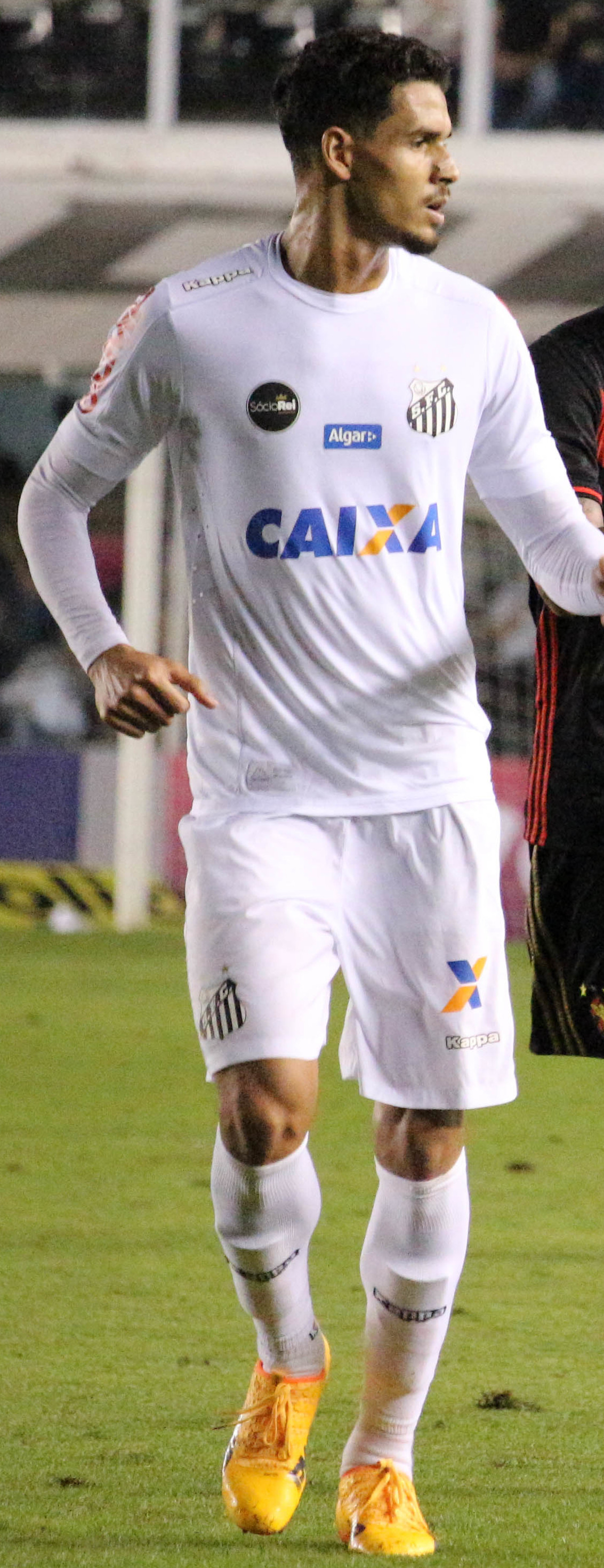
Lucas Veríssimo in action for Santos in 2017

Born in Jundiaí, São Paulo, Veríssimo started his career at José Bonifácio's youth academy. He subsequently moved to Linense, being promoted to the main squad in the latter part of January 2013.

Shortly after being promoted to Linense's first team, Lucas Veríssimo joined Santos. Upon joining Santos FC, he was initially assigned to their youth setup. On 26 March 2015 he renewed his link, signing until April 2017.

On 28 November 2015, profiting from Paulo Ricardo's suspension, Veríssimo was called up by manager Dorival Júnior for a Série A match against Vasco da Gama, but remained an unused substitute in the 0–1 away loss. On 30 December 2015 he was permanently promoted to the first team, due to squad shortage. He made his senior debut on 23 January of the following year, playing the full 90 minutes in a 2–2 friendly draw at Bahia.

Veríssimo made his professional debut on 30 January 2016, starting in a 1–1 Campeonato Paulista home draw against São Bernardo. On 2 March, after being a regular starter, he renewed his contract until December 2019.

After David Braz's return from injury and the signing of Luiz Felipe, Veríssimo was demoted to fourth choice at the club. He only made his Série A debut on 14 September 2016, coming on as a late substitute for Lucas Lima in a 1–0 away win against Botafogo.

Veríssimo made his Copa Libertadores debut on 16 March 2017, starting in a 2–0 home win against The Strongest. He scored his first professional goal on 4 May, netting the winner in a 3–2 success over Independiente Santa Fe at the Pacaembu Stadium for the same competition.

On 18 July 2017, after becoming a regular starter as both starters Gustavo Henrique and Luiz Felipe were injured, Veríssimo renewed his contract until June 2022. He played his 100th match for the club the following 13 May, starting in a 3–1 home defeat of Paraná.

On 8 June 2020, Veríssimo further extended his contract with Santos until December 2024. On 9 November, he and two other teammates tested positive for COVID-19.

=== Benfica ===
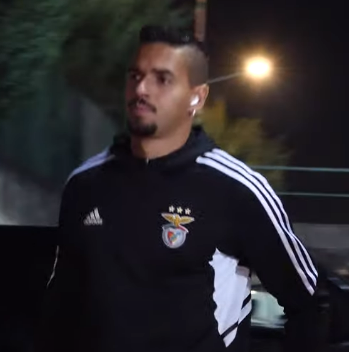
Veríssimo before a match for Benfica in 2023

On 4 January 2021, Veríssimo agreed to a move to Primeira Liga side S.L. Benfica, for a fee of €6.5 million; he remained at Santos until the end of the club's participation in the 2020 Copa Libertadores. Santos officially announced the move eleven days later. On 18 February 2021, Veríssimo made his debut in a 1–1 draw against Arsenal in the UEFA Europa League.

On 7 November 2021, during a home match against Braga, Veríssimo suffered an knee injury that required surgery, ruling him out for the rest of the 2021–22 season. After almost an year in the sidelines, Veríssimo made his return from injury on 22 October 2022, starting for Benfica's B team in a 2–0 away win at B-SAD in the Liga Portugal 2.

After returning from injury, Veríssimo struggled for minutes under new manager Roger Schmidt, who preferred a centre-back partnership of Otamendi and António Silva. In the 2022–23 season, Veríssimo made just 6 appearances in all competitions for Benfica's main team.

==== Loan to Corinthians ====
On 26 July 2023, Veríssimo returned to Brazil, joining Corinthians on a loan deal until 30 June 2024. The São Paulo-based club paid a loan fee of €1 million, which could rise to €2 million with add-ons.

=== Al-Duhail ===
On 25 January 2024, while Veríssimo was still at Corinthians, Benfica cancelled the loan and permanently transferred him to Qatar Stars League club Al-Duhail, for a reported fee of €9 million. He was a regular starter during the 2024–25 season, missing only one league match due to suspension and scoring three goals.

==== Loan to Al-Wakrah ====
On 22 July 2025, amidst rumours of a possible return to Brazil, Veríssimo was loaned to Al-Wakrah also in the Qatari top tier.

=== Santos return ===
On 3 March 2026, Santos announced the return of Veríssimo on a three-year contract. He made his re-debut for the club nineteen days later, captaining the side in a 0–0 away draw against Cruzeiro.

== International career ==
On 14 May 2021, Veríssimo was called up to the Brazil national team for two 2022 FIFA World Cup qualifying matches against Ecuador and Paraguay, but had to withdraw days later due to an injury. Called up again in August, he his full international debut on 9 September, starting in 2–0 win over Peru.

== Career statistics ==
=== Club ===
As of match played 18 October 2026

Appearances and goals by club, season and competition
Club	Season	League			State league (Note: Includes Campeonato Paulista)		National cup (Note: Includes Copa do Brasil, Taça de Portugal, Amir of Qatar Cup)		League cup (Note: Includes Taça da Liga, QSL Cup)		Continental		Other		Total	
Club	Season	Division	Apps	Goals	Apps	Goals	Apps	Goals	Apps	Goals	Apps	Goals	Apps	Goals	Apps	Goals
Santos	2016	Série A	3	0	13	0	3	0	—		—		—		19	0
Santos	2017	Série A	34	0	12	0	4	0	—		9 (Note: Appearance(s) in Copa Libertadores)	1	—		59	1
Santos	2018	Série A	14	0	10	1	2	0	—		7	1	—		33	2
Santos	2019	Série A	33	2	2	0	4	0	—		0	0	—		39	2
Santos	2020	Série A	16	1	7	0	1	0	—		11	1	—		35	2
Santos	Total		100	3	44	1	14	0	—		27	3	—		185	7
Benfica	2020–21	Primeira Liga	14	2	—		1	0	0	0	2 (Note: Appearance(s) in UEFA Europa League)	0	—		17	2
Benfica	2021–22	Primeira Liga	10	3	—		0	0	1	0	7 (Note: Appearance(s) in UEFA Champions League)	0	—		18	3
Benfica	2022–23	Primeira Liga	2	0	—		2	0	0	0	2	0	—		6	0
Benfica	Total		26	5	—		3	0	1	0	11	0	—		41	5
Benfica B	2022–23	Liga Portugal 2	2	0	—		—		—		—		—		2	0
Corinthians (loan)	2023	Série A	15	1	—		0	0	—		3 (Note: Appearance(s) in Copa Sudamericana)	0	—		18	1
Al-Duhail	2023–24	Qatar Stars League	10	0	—		2	0	—		—		—		12	0
Al-Duhail	2024–25	Qatar Stars League	21	3	—		2	0	6	0	—		2 (Note: Appearance(s) in Qatar Cup)	0	31	3
Al-Duhail	Total		31	3	—		4	0	6	0	—		2	0	43	3
Al-Wakrah (loan)	2025–26	Qatar Stars League	14	0	—		0	0	2	0	—		—		16	0
Santos	2026	Série A	19	0	—		5	0	—		7	0	—		31	0
Career total			207	12	44	1	26	0	9	0	48	3	2	0	336	16

=== International ===
As of match played 14 October 2021

National team	Year	Apps	Goals
Brazil	2021	2	0
Total		2	0

== Honours ==
=== Club ===
Santos

- Campeonato Paulista: 2016

Benfica

- Primeira Liga: 2022–23

=== Individual ===
- Bola de Prata: 2019
- Best Centre-back in Brazil: 2019, 2020
- Copa Libertadores Team of the Tournament: 2020
- Primeira Liga Player of the Month: August 2021
- Primeira Liga Defender of the Month: August 2021
- Samba D'or (3rd Place): 2021
