= Osman Júnior =

Brazilian footballer

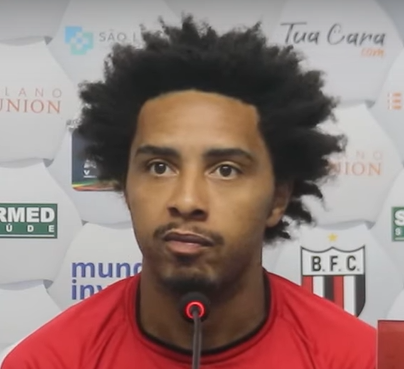
- Osman in 2022

Personal information
- Full name: Osman de Menezes Venâncio Júnior
- Date of birth: 29 October 1992 (age 34)
- Place of birth: São Paulo, Brazil
- Height: 1.79 m (5 ft 10 in)
- Position: Winger

Team information
- Current team: Chapecoense

Youth career
- 2010–2012: Santos

Senior career*
Years	Team	Apps	(Gls)
2012–2013	Oeste	2	(0)
2013	Comercial-SP	0	(0)
2014	Sertãozinho	21	(0)
2014	Juventus-SP	0	(0)
2015–2018	Luverdense	49	(6)
2016	→ América Mineiro (loan)	37	(7)
2017–2018	→ Chapecoense (loan)	19	(1)
2019	Red Bull Brasil	14	(2)
2019	Red Bull Bragantino	2	(0)
2019–2020	Gyeongnam	7	(1)
2020	Ponte Preta	8	(0)
2020–2021	Coritiba	7	(0)
2021	Cuiabá	14	(0)
2022	Inter de Limeira	10	(0)
2022	Mirassol	22	(2)
2023	Botafogo-SP	47	(5)
2024–	Chapecoense	0	(0)
- * Club domestic league appearances and goals as of 11 November 2023

Osman de Menezes Venâncio Júnior (born 29 October 1992), known as Osman Júnior or simply Osman, is a Brazilian footballer who plays for Chapecoense. Mainly a winger, he can also play as an attacking midfielder.

== Club career ==
=== Early career ===
Osman Júnior was born in São Paulo, and was a Santos youth graduate. Released in 2012, he signed for Oeste and made his senior debut on 12 August of that year by coming on as a second-half substitute in a 0–1 Série C away loss against Chapecoense.

After being rarely used, Osman Júnior represented Comercial-SP, Sertãozinho and Juventus in quick succession.

=== Luverdense ===
On 10 January 2015, Osman Júnior joined Luverdense. He scored his first goal for the club on 10 March, netting the opener in a 2–0 home success over Operário Várzea-Grandense.

Osman Júnior scored his first professional goal on 16 May 2015, netting the game's only in a home success over América Mineiro for the Série B championship. He finished the campaign with four goals in 35 appearances, as his side achieved a mid-table position.

==== Loan to América Mineiro ====
On 28 December 2015 Osman Júnior was loaned to América Mineiro, recently promoted to Série A, for one year. He made his debut in the competition on 15 May 2016, playing the full 90 minutes in a 0–1 home loss against Fluminense.

==== Loan to Chapecoense ====
On 9 January 2017, Osman Júnior was presented at Chapecoense also in the top tier, after agreeing to a one-year loan deal. In June, he suffered a serious knee injury, being sidelined for the remainder of the campaign; his loan was renewed for a further year the following 8 January.

=== Red Bull (Brasil & Bragantino) ===
On 7 January 2019, Osman Júnior signed a short-term deal with Red Bull Brasil, for the Campeonato Paulista. He became a Red Bull Bragantino player when Red Bull Brasil merged with Clube Atlético Bragantino in April 2019.

== Career statistics ==
As of 29 October 2021

Club	Season	League			State League		Cup		Continental		Other		Total	
Club	Season	Division	Apps	Goals	Apps	Goals	Apps	Goals	Apps	Goals	Apps	Goals	Apps	Goals
Oeste	2012	Série C	1	0	—		—		—		—		1	0
Oeste	2013	Série B	0	0	1	0	—		—		—		1	0
Oeste	Total		1	0	1	0	—		—		—		2	0
Comercial-SP	2013	Paulista A2	—		0	0	—		—		11 (Note: Appearance(s) in Copa Paulista)	0	11	0
Sertãozinho	2014	Paulista A3	—		21	0	—		—		—		21	0
Juventus-SP	2014	Paulista A3	—		0	0	—		—		13	0	13	0
Luverdense	2015	Série B	35	4	14	2	4	1	—		6 (Note: Appearance(s) in Copa Verde)	0	59	7
América Mineiro (loan)	2016	Série A	26	2	11	5	5	1	—		3 (Note: Appearance(s) in Primeira Liga)	0	45	8
Chapecoense (loan)	2017	Série A	7	1	12	0	1	0	3 (Note: Appearance(s) in Copa Libertadores)	0	2 (Note: One appearance in Primeira Liga, one appearance in Recopa Sudamericana)	0	25	1
Chapecoense (loan)	2018	Série A	13	1	6	0	1	0	—		—		20	1
Chapecoense (loan)	Total		20	2	18	0	2	0	3	0	2	0	45	2
Red Bull Brasil	2019	Paulista	—		14	2	—		—		—		14	2
Red Bull Bragantino	2019	Série B	2	0	—		—		—		—		2	0
Gyeongnam	2019	K League 1	7	1	—		—		—		—		7	1
Ponte Preta	2020	Série B	6	0	2	0	1	0	—		—		9	0
Coritiba	2020	Série A	7	0	—		—		—		—		7	0
Cuiabá	2021	Série A	13	0	4	1	1	0	—		1	0	19	1
Career total			117	9	85	10	12	2	3	0	36	0	254	21

== Honours ==
Oeste

- Campeonato Brasileiro Série C: 2012

América Mineiro

- Campeonato Mineiro: 2016

Chapecoense

- Campeonato Catarinense: 2017
