= Frazan =

Brazilian footballer (born 1996)

Personal information
- Full name: Wesley Frazan Bernardo
- Date of birth: 5 June 1996 (age 30)
- Place of birth: Macaé, Brazil
- Height: 1.88 m (6 ft 2 in)
- Position: Centre back

Team information
- Current team: Ituano

Youth career
- 2013–2016: Fluminense

Senior career*
Years	Team	Apps	(Gls)
2017–2022	Fluminense	40	(1)
2021	→ CRB (loan)	20	(1)
2022	→ Chapecoense (loan)	23	(0)
2023–	Ituano	7	(0)
- * Club domestic league appearances and goals as of 22:39, 10 November 2021 (UTC)

Wesley Frazan Bernardo (born 5 June 1996), simply known as Frazan, is a Brazilian footballer who plays as a central defender for Ituano.

== Career statistics ==
As of 10 November 2021

Club	Season	League			State League		Cup		Continental		Other		Total	
Club	Season	Division	Apps	Goals	Apps	Goals	Apps	Goals	Apps	Goals	Apps	Goals	Apps	Goals
Fluminense	2017	Série A	6	0	2	0	0	0	3 (Note: All appearance(s) in Copa Sudamericana)	0	—		11	0
Fluminense	2018	Série A	5	0	3	0	0	0	1	0	—		9	0
Fluminense	2019	Série A	11	1	0	0	1	0	2	0	—		14	1
Fluminense	2020	Série A	1	0	5	0	0	0	0	0	—		6	0
Fluminense	2021	Série A	0	0	5	0	0	0	0	0	—		5	0
Fluminense	Subtotal		23	1	15	0	1	0	6	0	—		45	1
CRB (loan)	2021	Série B	10	0	5	1	2	0	—		2 (Note: All appearance(s) in Copa do Nordeste qualification)	0	19	1
Career total			33	1	20	1	3	0	6	0	2	0	64	2
