= Léo Rigo =

Brazilian footballer

Personal information
- Full name: Leonardo Rigo da Silva
- Date of birth: 25 April 1995 (age 31)
- Place of birth: Cascavel, Brazil
- Height: 1.88 m (6 ft 2 in)
- Positions: Centre-back; left-back

Team information
- Current team: Tai Po
- Number: 4

Youth career
- 2007–2008: Grêmio
- 2009–2011: Cruzeiro
- 2011–2012: Avaí
- 2012–2013: Internacional
- 2013–2015: Guarani

Senior career*
Years	Team	Apps	(Gls)
2014–2017	Guarani	13	(0)
2018	Água Santa	8	(0)
2018	Marcílio Dias	17	(1)
2019	Bragantino	10	(1)
2019–2020	Ituano	30	(2)
2019	→ Londrina (loan)	9	(0)
2021	Operário Ferroviário	10	(0)
2021–2022	Ferroviária	17	(0)
2022–2023	Marcílio Dias	17	(1)
2023	Aparecidense	15	(0)
2023–2024	Hercílio Luz	14	(0)
2024	Volta Redonda	8	(0)
2025	Joinville	24	(0)
2026	São José-SP	14	(0)
2026	Joinville	3	(0)
2026–	Tai Po	8	(0)
- * Club domestic league appearances and goals as of 14:51, 21 November 2026 (UTC)

Leonardo "Léo" Rigo da Silva (born 25 April 1995) is a Brazilian professional footballer who currently plays as a centre-back for Hong Kong Premier League club Tai Po.

== Club career ==
Born in Cascavel, Paraná, Rigo was a Guarani youth graduate, and made his first team debut on 12 April 2014, starting in a 3–2 Campeonato Paulista Série A2 home loss to Rio Branco-SP.

Rigo would fail to make his breakthrough at Bugre, and moved to Água Santa on 29 December 2017. He later played for Marcílio Dias, before signing for Bragantino on 4 December 2018.

In April 2019, Rigo agreed to a contract with Ituano, where he became a starter. He renewed his contract with the club until 2020 on 16 August, being immediately loaned to Londrina. On 10 February 2021, he terminated his link with the former and moved to Operário Ferroviário.

On 24 June 2021, Ferroviária announced the signing of Rigo on a one-year contract. He returned to Marcílio for the 2022 season, notably scoring a goal in a Copa Santa Catarina win over Carlos Renaux which gained national attention.

On 17 March 2023, Rigo left Marcílio and agreed to a pre-contract with Aparecidense. On 14 September, he was presented at Hercílio Luz.

On 1 July 2024, Rigo moved to Volta Redonda. He won the 2024 Série C with the club before being released on 22 October, and signed for Joinville on 11 November.

On 11 November 2025, Rigo was announced as the new signing of São José-SP. The following 28 April, he returned to his previous club.

On 16 July 2026, Rigo joined Hong Kong Premier League club Tai Po.

== Career statistics ==
As of 4 May 2026

Club	Season	League			State League		Cup		Continental		Other		Total	
Club	Season	Division	Apps	Goals	Apps	Goals	Apps	Goals	Apps	Goals	Apps	Goals	Apps	Goals
Guarani	2014	Série C	—		1	0	—		—		—		1	0
Guarani	2015	Série C	5	0	—		—		—		—		5	0
Guarani	2016	Série C	0	0	4	0	—		—		—		4	0
Guarani	2017	Série B	3	0	0	0	—		—		—		3	0
Guarani	Subtotal		8	0	5	0	—		—		—		13	0
Água Santa	2018	Paulista A2	—		8	0	—		—		—		8	0
Marcílio Dias	2018	Catarinense Série B	—		17	1	—		—		—		17	1
Bragantino	2019	Série B	—		10	1	—		—		—		10	1
Ituano	2019	Série D	14	1	—		—		—		—		14	1
Ituano	2020	Série C	0	0	9	0	—		—		—		9	0
Ituano	Subtotal		14	1	9	0	—		—		—		23	1
Londrina (loan)	2019	Série B	9	0	—		—		—		—		9	0
Operário Ferroviário	2021	Série B	1	0	9	0	2	0	—		—		12	0
Ferroviária	2021	Série D	14	0	—		—		—		—		14	0
Ferroviária	2022	Série D	—		3	0	0	0	—		—		3	0
Ferroviária	Subtotal		14	0	3	0	0	0	—		—		17	0
Marcílio Dias	2022	Série D	8	1	—		—		—		10 (Note: Appearance(s) in Copa Santa Catarina)	0	18	1
Marcílio Dias	2023	Catarinense	—		9	0	1	0	—		1 (Note: Appearance(s) in Recopa Catarinense)	0	11	0
Marcílio Dias	Subtotal		8	1	9	0	1	0	—		11	0	29	1
Aparecidense	2023	Série C	15	0	—		—		—		—		15	0
Hercílio Luz	2023	Série D	—		—		—		—		9	0	9	0
Hercílio Luz	2024	Série D	8	0	6	0	—		—		—		14	0
Hercílio Luz	Subtotal		8	0	6	0	—		—		9	0	23	0
Volta Redonda	2024	Série C	8	0	—		—		—		2 (Note: Appearance(s) in Copa Rio)	0	10	0
Joinville	2025	Série D	13	0	11	0	—		—		—		24	0
São José-SP	2026	Paulista A2	—		14	0	—		—		—		14	0
Joinville	2026	Série D	0	0	—		—		—		—		0	0
Career total			98	2	101	2	3	0	0	0	22	0	224	4

== Honours ==
Volta Redonda

- Campeonato Brasileiro Série C: 2024
