= Jean Mota =

Brazilian footballer (born 1993)

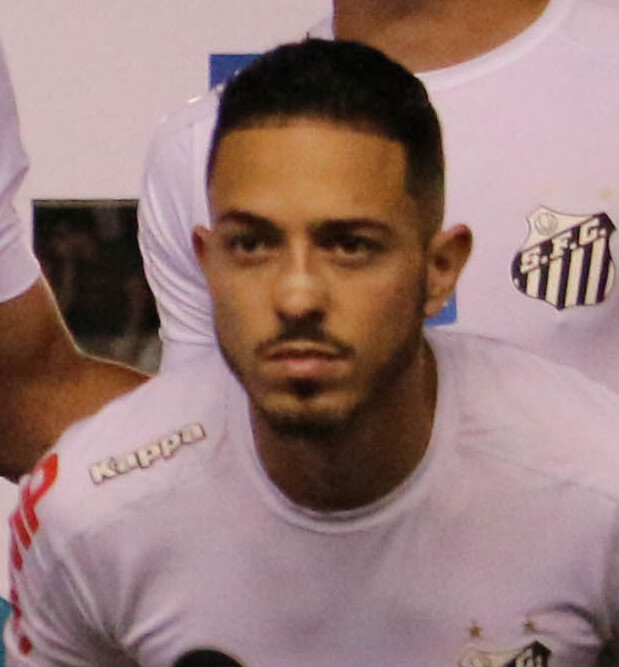
- Jean Mota with Santos in 2017

Personal information
- Full name: Jean Mota Oliveira de Sousa
- Date of birth: 15 October 1993 (age 33)
- Place of birth: São Paulo, Brazil
- Height: 1.72 m (5 ft 8 in)
- Position: Midfielder

Team information
- Current team: Sporting JAX
- Number: 14

Youth career
- 2006–2013: Portuguesa

Senior career*
Years	Team	Apps	(Gls)
2012–2015	Portuguesa	48	(2)
2015–2016	Fortaleza	17	(4)
2016–2021	Santos	198	(17)
2022–2024	Inter Miami	48	(2)
2024–2025	Vitória	16	(1)
2025	→ Vila Nova (loan)	18	(1)
2025–2026	Vila Nova	9	(0)
2026	Persija Jakarta	12	(1)
2026–	Sporting JAX	12	(1)
- * Club domestic league appearances and goals as of 31 October 2026

Jean Mota Oliveira de Sousa (born 15 October 1993), known as Jean Mota (Brazilian Portuguese: [ʒeˈɐ̃n ˈmɔtɐ]), is a Brazilian professional footballer. Mainly an attacking midfielder, he can also play as a left back or a central midfielder.

== Club career ==
=== Portuguesa ===
Born in São Paulo, Jean Mota was a Portuguesa youth graduate. He made his debut on 21 March 2012, coming on as a late substitute for Henrique in a 4–0 home routing of Cuiabá, for the season's Copa do Brasil.

On 28 May 2013, Jean Mota renewed his contract with Lusa, signing until 2015. He made his Série A debut on 8 June, again from the bench in a 0–0 draw against Corinthians.

Jean Mota appeared regularly for the club in the following campaign, being mostly deployed as a left back. He scored his first senior goal on 19 September, netting a last-minute equalizer in a 1–1 away draw against América-RN.

=== Fortaleza ===
On 16 September 2015 Jean Mota moved to Fortaleza, after being released by Portuguesa in May. He subsequently became an undisputed starter for the club in 2016, being an important unit during the Campeonato Cearense winning campaign.

=== Santos ===
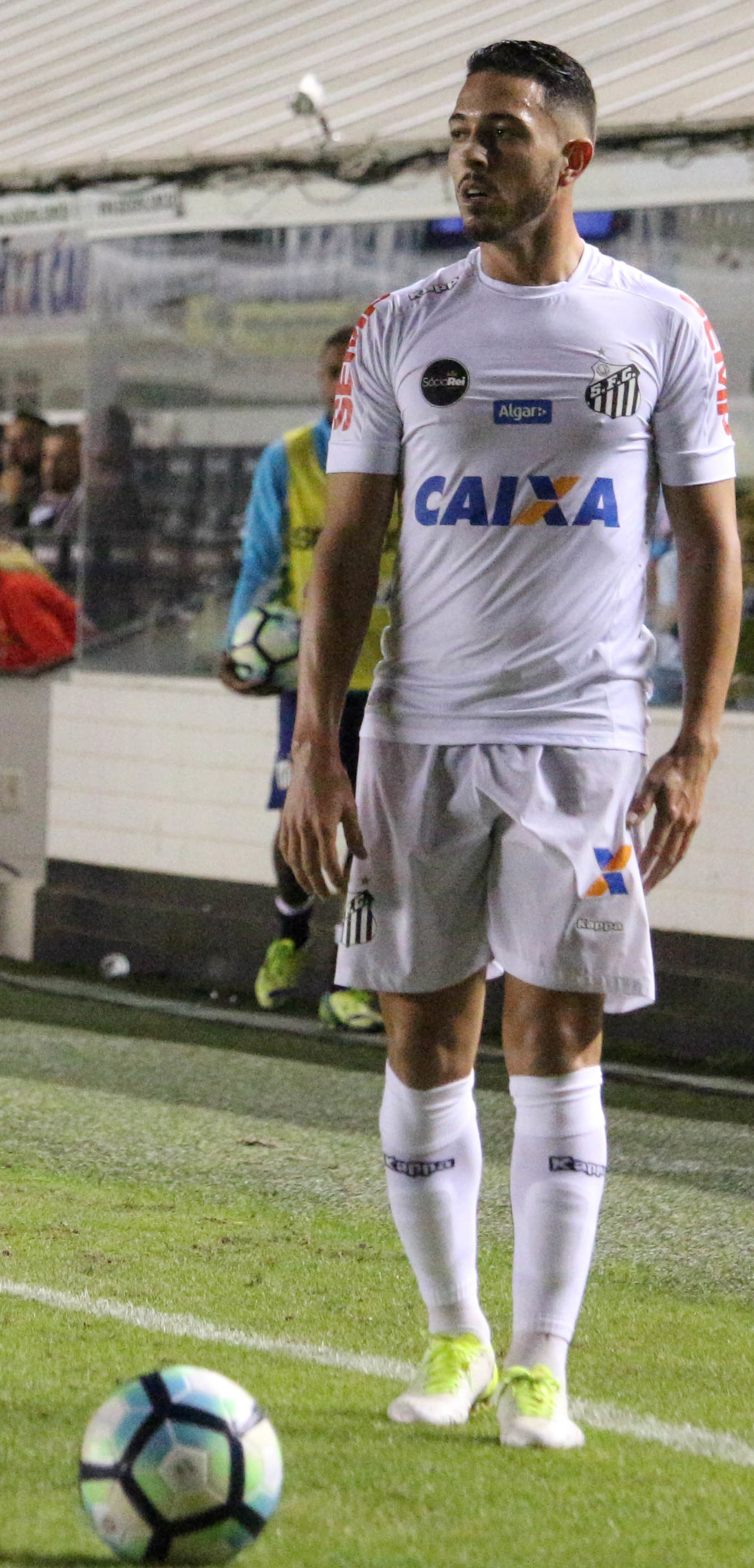
Jean Mota in action for Santos in 2017

On 6 June 2016 Jean Mota signed a four-year deal with Santos. He was officially announced at the club three days later. He made his debut for Peixe on 26 June, coming on as a late substitute for goalscorer Lucas Lima in a 3–0 home win against São Paulo.

Jean Mota scored his first goal in the main category of Brazilian football on 24 July 2016, netting the winner in a 3–2 success at Vitória. He made his Copa Libertadores debut on 19 April of the following year, starting as a left back and being sent off in a 0–0 away draw against Independiente Santa Fe.

After the injuries of Zeca and Caju, Jean Mota established himself as a regular starter in the left back. On 18 July 2017, he renewed his contract until June 2022. He spent the 2018 campaign as a backup to new signing Dodô and behind midfield options Carlos Sánchez, Diego Pituca and Alison.

Jean Mota started the 2019 season as a starter in the midfield under new manager Jorge Sampaoli, scoring eight goals and providing six assists in the first three months of competition. He was named the best player of the 2019 Campeonato Paulista, but subsequently lost his starting spot.

On 10 November 2020, it was announced that Jean Mota and a further six first team players tested positive for COVID-19. He left the club in December 2021, after playing 258 matches and scoring 20 goals.

=== Inter Miami ===
In November 2021, Santos agreed to a transfer of Jean Mota to Major League Soccer side Inter Miami, effective as of the following 15 January. His new side officially announced the transfer on 12 December, with the player signing a contract until 2024.

In May 2023, Mota suffered a right knee injured which sidelined him for almost six months.

=== Vitória ===
Inter Miami CF transferred midfielder Jean Mota to Brazilian top-flight side Vitória on 5 March 2024.

== Career statistics ==
As of 6 March 2024

Club	Season	League			State League		Cup		Continental		Other		Total	
Club	Season	Division	Apps	Goals	Apps	Goals	Apps	Goals	Apps	Goals	Apps	Goals	Apps	Goals
Portuguesa	2012	Série A	0	0	0	0	1	0	—		—		1	0
Portuguesa	2013	Série A	13	0	7	0	1	0	2 (Note: Appearance(s) in Copa Sudamericana)	0	—		23	0
Portuguesa	2014	Série B	18	1	2	0	2	0	—		—		22	1
Portuguesa	2015	Série C	0	0	8	1	1	0	—		—		9	1
Portuguesa	Total		31	1	17	1	5	0	2	0	—		55	2
Fortaleza	2015	Série C	0	0	—		—		—		3 (Note: Appearance(s) in Copa Fares Lopes)	0	3	0
Fortaleza	2016	Série C	2	1	15	3	4	1	—		7 (Note: Appearance(s) in Copa do Nordeste)	1	28	6
Fortaleza	Total		2	1	15	3	4	1	0	0	10	1	31	6
Santos	2016	Série A	23	2	—		—		—		—		23	2
Santos	2017	Série A	30	1	5	0	3	0	6 (Note: Appearance(s) in Copa Libertadores)	0	—		44	1
Santos	2018	Série A	20	2	12	0	3	0	7	0	—		42	2
Santos	2019	Série A	27	1	15	7	7	2	2	0	—		51	10
Santos	2020	Série A	28	1	6	0	2	0	7	1	—		43	2
Santos	2021	Série A	23	2	9	1	6	0	11 (Note: Seven appearances in Copa Libertadores, four appearances in Copa Sudamericana)	0	—		49	3
Santos	Total		151	9	47	8	21	2	33	1	—		252	20
Inter Miami	2022	Major League Soccer	33	2	—		2	1	—		1 (Note: Appearance in MLS Cup Playoffs)	0	36	3
Inter Miami	2023	Major League Soccer	13	0	—		2	0	—		—		15	0
Inter Miami	2024	Major League Soccer	2	0	—		—		—		—		2	0
Inter Miami	Total		48	2	—		4	1	—		1	0	53	3
Career total			232	13	79	12	34	4	35	1	11	1	391	31

== Honours ==
Portuguesa

- Campeonato Paulista Série A2: 2013

Fortaleza

- Campeonato Cearense: 2016

Inter Miami

- Leagues Cup: 2023

Individual

- Campeonato Cearense Best Player: 2016
- Campeonato Paulista Best Player: 2019
- Campeonato Paulista Top Scorer: 2019
- Campeonato Paulista Team of the Year: 2019
