= Igor Cássio =

Brazilian footballer (born 1998)

Personal information
- Full name: Igor Cássio Vieira dos Santos
- Date of birth: 30 June 1998 (age 28)
- Place of birth: Belford Roxo, RJ, Brazil
- Height: 1.84 m (6 ft 1/2 in)
- Position: Forward

Team information
- Current team: Tombense
- Number: 9

Youth career
- 2015–2018: Botafogo

Senior career*
Years	Team	Apps	(Gls)
2019–2020	Botafogo	22	(3)
2020	Porto B	29	(2)
2021–	Tombense	13	(0)
2022	→ Anápolis (loan)	3	(0)
2023–2024	→ Anápolis (loan)	11	(1)
- * Club domestic league appearances and goals as of 20 March 2023

Igor Cássio Vieira dos Santos (born 30 June 1998), known as Igor Cássio, is a Brazilian footballer who plays for Tombense a forward.

== Career statistics ==
As of 27 November 2019

Club	Season	League			State League		Cup		Continental		Other		Total	
Club	Season	Division	Apps	Goals	Apps	Goals	Apps	Goals	Apps	Goals	Apps	Goals	Apps	Goals
Botafogo	2019	Série A	11	2	2	0	1	0	3 (Note: All appearance(s) in Copa Sudamericana)	0	—		17	2
Career total			11	2	2	0	1	0	3	0	0	0	17	2
