= Gustavo Henrique (footballer, born 1993) =

Brazilian footballer

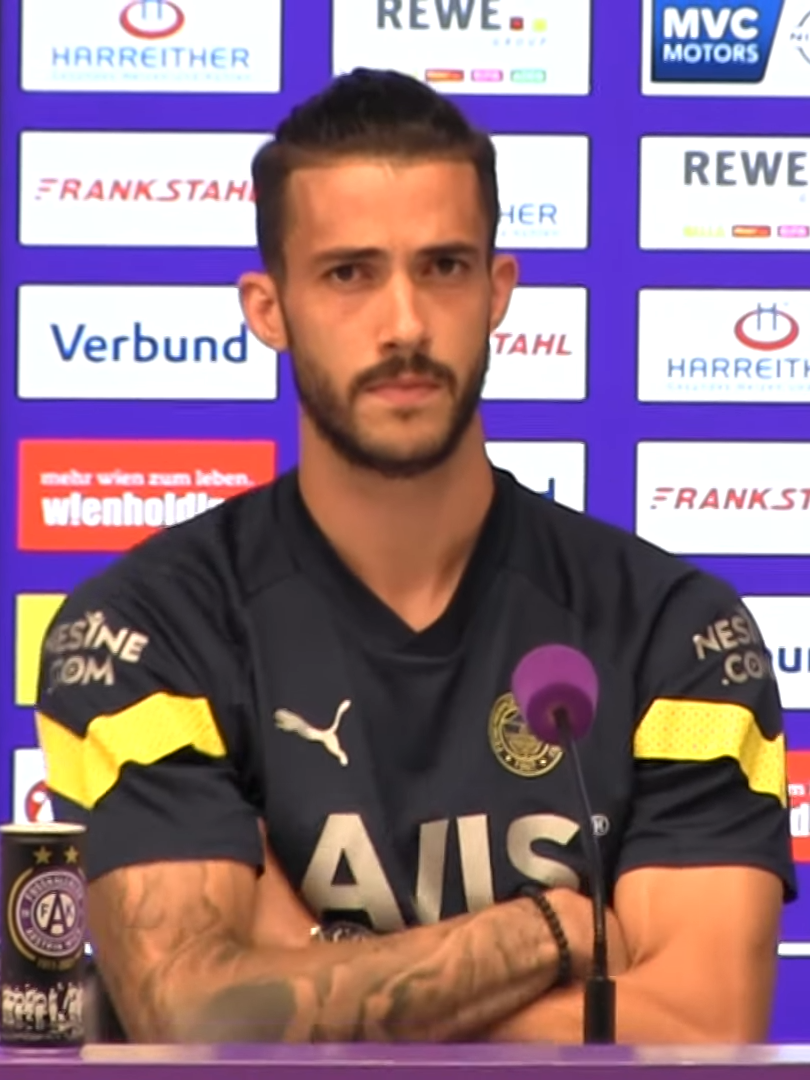
- Gustavo Henrique during a press conference as Fenerbahçe player in 2022

Personal information
- Full name: Gustavo Henrique Vernes
- Date of birth: 24 March 1993 (age 33)
- Place of birth: São Paulo, Brazil
- Height: 1.96 m (6 ft 5 in)
- Position: Centre-back

Team information
- Current team: Corinthians
- Number: 13

Youth career
- Vitória
- 2007–2013: Santos

Senior career*
Years	Team	Apps	(Gls)
2011–2019	Santos	183	(10)
2020–2023	Flamengo	65	(5)
2022–2023	→ Fenerbahçe (loan)	13	(2)
2023	Fenerbahçe	0	(0)
2023–2024	Valladolid	12	(1)
2024–	Corinthians	84	(9)

International career^{‡}
2013	Brazil U20	3	(0)
2015	Brazil U23	2	(0)
Medal record
Representing Brazil
Men's Football
Pan American Games
Bronze medal – third place	2015 Toronto	Team competition
- * Club domestic league appearances and goals as of 18 November 2026 ‡ National team caps and goals as of 25 July 2015

Gustavo Henrique Vernes (born 24 March 1993), better known as Gustavo Henrique, is a Brazilian professional footballer who plays as a centre-back for Campeonato Brasileiro Serie A club Corinthians.

== Club career ==
=== Early career ===
Born in São Paulo, Gustavo Henrique moved to Salvador, Bahia at early age. He started his career at Vitória's youth setup, before moving back to his home state in 2007, after joining Santos.

=== Santos ===
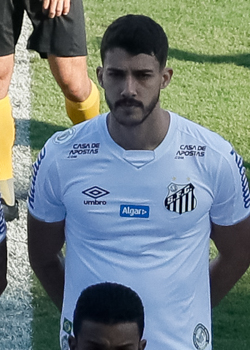
Gustavo Henrique with Santos in 2019

Gustavo Henrique and made his first team – and Série A – debut on 17 June 2012, in a 1–0 away loss against Flamengo. He scored his first goal on 24 July of the following year, in a 2–0 away win against CRAC in the 2013 Copa do Brasil.

In mid-September 2013, Gustavo Henrique replaced Durval in the starting eleven, after the latter was deemed surplus to requirements. He scored his first league goal on 27 October, in a 1–1 away draw against Corinthians. Roughly a month later he scored his second, in a 2–2 away draw against Vasco da Gama.

In late February 2014, Gustavo Henrique suffered a knee injury, being sidelined for six months. He returned to action in October, but was only selected on the bench in the remainder of the season.

Gustavo Henrique played his first match after his injury on 1 February 2015, starting in a 3–0 home win against Ituano. In August, after the arrival of new manager Dorival Júnior, he was again first-choice after overtaking new signing Werley.

On 29 February 2016, Gustavo Henrique renewed his contract until January 2020. He became an undisputed starter during the campaign, and on 12 June completed his 100th game for the club by starting in a 2–0 away win against Santa Cruz. In September, however, he suffered another knee injury, being sidelined for another six months.

Gustavo Henrique returned to action on 14 August 2017, starting in a 0–0 home draw against Fluminense. On 10 September, in a 2–0 home win against Corinthians, he suffered another knee injury and was sidelined for the remainder of the year.

Gustavo Henrique made his Copa Libertadores debut on 5 April 2018, replacing Renato late into a 1–0 away win against Estudiantes.

=== Flamengo ===
In December 2019, Gustavo Henrique agreed to a pre-contract deal with Flamengo, effective as of the following 1 February. On 3 January 2020, however, he was announced by the club after agreeing to a four-year deal.

=== Fenerbahçe ===
On 26 July 2022, Gustavo Henrique signed with Turkish club Fenerbahçe on a season-long loan with option to buy. At the end of the season, he signed a permanent two-year deal with Fenerbahçe.

=== Valladolid ===
On 22 August 2023, Gustavo Henrique moved to Spanish Segunda División side Real Valladolid on a three-year contract.

=== Corinthians ===
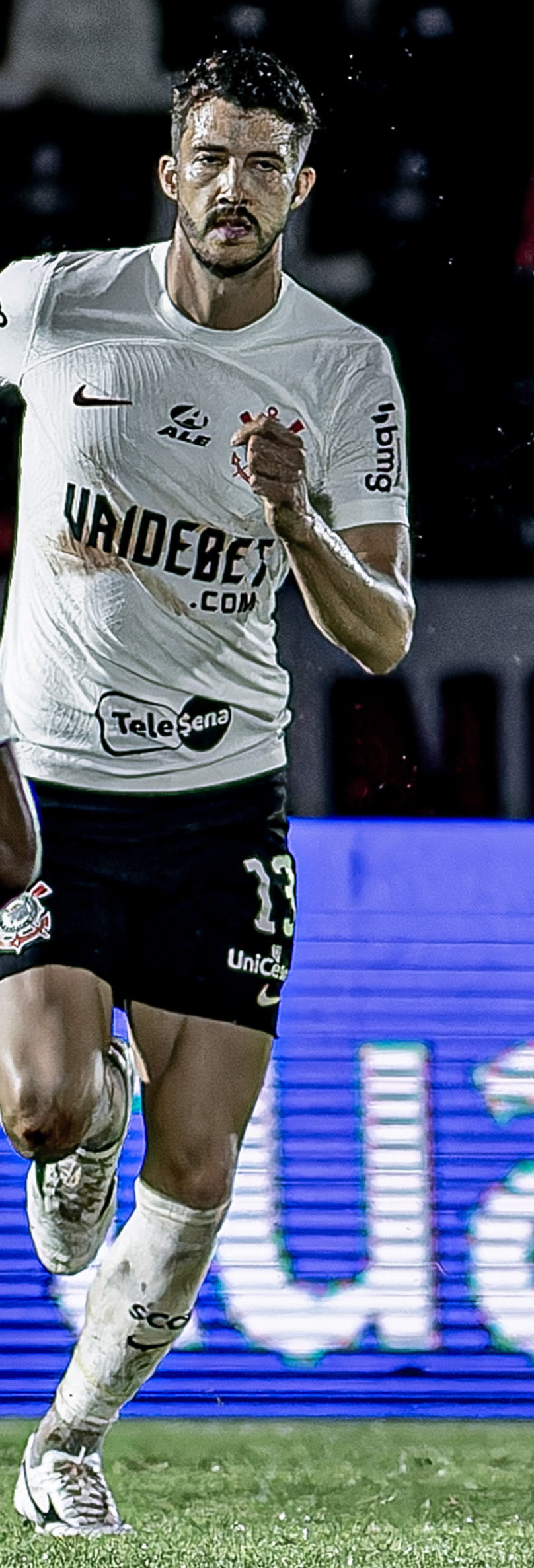
Gustavo Henrique playing for Corinthians in 2024

On 15 January 2024, Gustavo Henrique was announced at Corinthians back in his country's top tier, on a two-year contract.

== Career statistics ==
As of match played 18 November 2026

Appearances and goals by club, season and competition
Club	Season	League			State league (Note: Includes Campeonato Paulista, Campeonato Carioca)		National cup (Note: Includes Copa do Brasil, Turkish Cup, Copa del Rey)		Continental		Other		Total	
Club	Season	Division	Apps	Goals	Apps	Goals	Apps	Goals	Apps	Goals	Apps	Goals	Apps	Goals
Santos	2012	Série A	1	0	—		—		—		—		1	0
Santos	2013	Série A	24	2	—		3	1	—		—		27	3
Santos	2014	Série A	—		8	0	—		—		—		8	0
Santos	2015	Série A	20	0	7	0	10	0	—		—		37	0
Santos	2016	Série A	24	1	18	2	4	0	—		—		46	3
Santos	2017	Série A	2	0	—		—		—		—		2	0
Santos	2018	Série A	29	1	4	0	4	1	2 (Note: Appearances in Copa Libertadores)	0	—		39	2
Santos	2019	Série A	32	3	14	1	7	1	2 (Note: Appearances in Copa Sudamericana)	0	—		55	5
Santos	Total		132	7	51	3	28	3	4	0	—		215	13
Flamengo	2020	Série A	25	2	7	0	2	0	4	1	3 (Note: Two appearances in Recopa Sudamericana, one appearance in Supercopa do Brasil)	0	41	3
Flamengo	2021	Série A	21	2	3	0	3	0	8	1	—		35	3
Flamengo	2022	Série A	5	1	4	1	—		1	0	—		10	2
Flamengo	Total		51	5	14	1	5	0	13	2	3	0	86	8
Fenerbahçe (loan)	2022–23	Süper Lig	13	2	—		1	0	9 (Note: Appearances in UEFA Europa League)	1	—		23	3
Valladolid	2023–24	Segunda División	12	1	—		1	0	—		—		13	1
Corinthians	2024	Série A	18	1	4	0	7	1	6	0	—		35	2
Corinthians	2025	Série A	23	3	4	0	8	1	4 (Note: Two appearances in Copa Libertadores, two appearances in Copa Sudamericana)	0	—		39	4
Corinthians	2026	Série A	30	4	6	1	4	1	10	3	1 (Note: Appearances in Supercopa do Brasil)	0	51	9
Corinthians	Total		71	8	14	1	19	3	20	3	1	0	125	15
Career total			279	23	79	5	54	6	46	6	4	0	462	40

== Honours ==
Santos

- Campeonato Paulista: 2015, 2016

Flamengo

- Série A: 2020
- Copa do Brasil: 2022
- Supercopa do Brasil: 2020, 2021
- Copa Libertadores: 2022
- Recopa Sudamericana: 2020
- Campeonato Carioca: 2020, 2021

Fenerbahçe

- Turkish Cup: 2022–23

Corinthians

- Copa do Brasil: 2025
- Campeonato Paulista: 2025
- Supercopa do Brasil: 2026

Individual

- Campeonato Paulista Team of the Year: 2016, 2019
