= 2018 Santos FC season =

Santos
2018 season
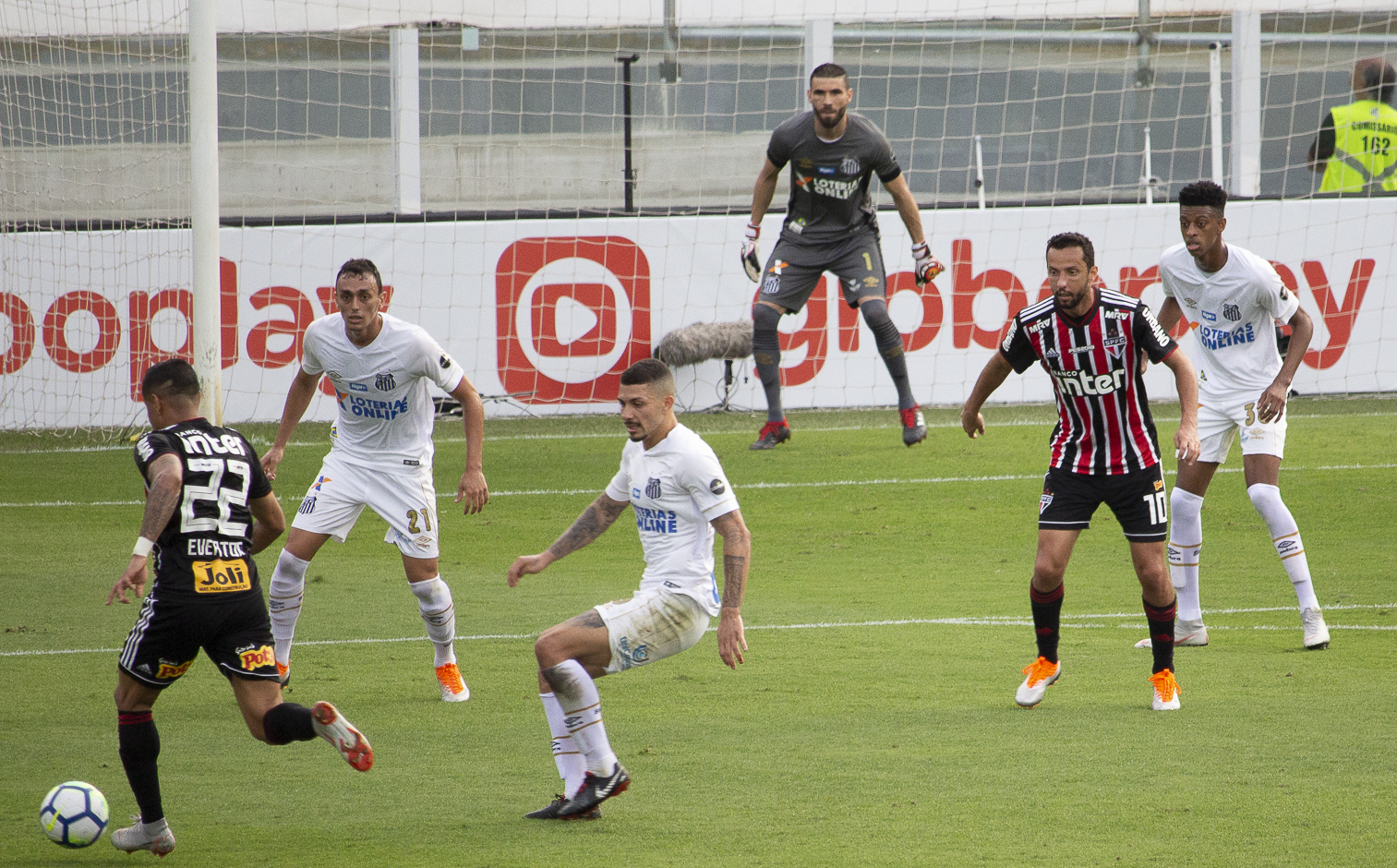
- Santos vs São Paulo at the Vila Belmiro on 16 September
- President: José Carlos Peres
- Coach: Cuca
- Stadium: Vila Belmiro
- Campeonato Brasileiro: 10th
- Campeonato Paulista: Semifinals
- Copa do Brasil: Quarterfinals
- Copa Libertadores: Round of 16
- Top goalscorer: League: Gabriel (18); All: Gabriel (27)
- Highest home attendance: 37,431 vs Corinthians (4 March)
- Lowest home attendance: 3,590 vs Luverdense (10 May)
Home colours	Away colours

The 2018 season is Santos Futebol Clube's 106th season in existence and the club's fifty-ninth consecutive season in the top flight of Brazilian football. As well as the Campeonato Brasileiro, the club competes in the Copa do Brasil, the Campeonato Paulista and also in Copa Libertadores.

== Players ==
=== Squad information ===
As of 4 December 2018

No.	Name	Pos.	Nat.	Place of birth	Date of birth (age)	Club caps	Club goals	Int. caps	Int. goals	Signed from	Date signed	Fee	Contract End
Goalkeepers
1	Vanderlei	GK	(Brazil)	Porecatu (Paraná (state))	1 February 1984 (aged 34)	234	0	–	–	Coritiba	23 January 2015	Undisc.	31 December 2020
12	Vladimir	GK	(Brazil)	Ipiaú (Bahia)	16 July 1989 (aged 29)	61	0	–	–	Youth System	1 January 2009	Free	31 December 2020
33	John Victor	GK	(Brazil)	Diadema (São Paulo (state))	13 February 1996 (aged 22)	1	0	–	–	Youth System	11 January 2016	Free	12 January 2021
34	João Paulo	GK	(Brazil)	Dourados (Mato Grosso do Sul)	29 June 1995 (aged 23)	3	0	–	–	Youth System	26 February 2014	Free	30 September 2021
Defenders
2	Luiz Felipe	CB	(Brazil)	Tubarão (Santa Catarina (state))	9 October 1993 (aged 25)	69	2	–	–	Paraná	17 February 2016	R$ 1M	30 September 2022
4	Victor Ferraz	RB	(Brazil)	João Pessoa (Paraíba)	14 January 1988 (aged 30)	216	9	–	–	Coritiba	18 June 2014	Free	31 December 2019
6	Gustavo Henrique	CB	(Brazil)	São Paulo (São Paulo (state))	24 March 1993 (aged 25)	166	8	–	–	Youth System	10 January 2013	Free	31 January 2020
13	Kaique Rocha	CB	(Brazil)	Taboão da Serra (São Paulo (state))	28 February 2001 (aged 17)	0	0	–	–	Youth System	9 November 2018	Free	29 February 2020
16	Dodô	LB	(Brazil)	Campinas (São Paulo (state))	6 February 1992 (aged 26)	51	1	–	–	Sampdoria (Italy)	22 February 2018	Loan	31 December 2018
28	Lucas Veríssimo	CB	(Brazil)	Jundiaí (São Paulo (state))	2 July 1995 (aged 23)	114	3	–	–	Youth System	28 November 2015	Free	30 June 2022
35	Robson Bambu	CB/RB	(Brazil)	São Vicente (São Paulo (state))	12 November 1997 (aged 21)	13	0	–	–	Youth System	13 January 2018	Free	10 November 2018
38	Daniel Guedes	RB	(Brazil)	João Ramalho (São Paulo (state))	2 April 1994 (aged 24)	74	1	–	–	Youth System	19 February 2014	Free	30 June 2022
Midfielders
3	Jean Mota	AM/LB	(Brazil)	São Paulo (São Paulo (state))	15 October 1993 (aged 25)	113	5	–	–	Fortaleza	9 June 2016	Free	30 June 2022
5	Alison	DM	(Brazil)	Cubatão (São Paulo (state))	1 March 1993 (aged 25)	165	3	–	–	Youth System	9 September 2011	Free	31 December 2022
7	Pato Sánchez	CM/AM	(Uruguay)	Montevideo	2 December 1984 (aged 34)	18	4	38	1	Monterrey (Mexico)	23 July 2018	Free	31 December 2021
8	Renato	DM	(Brazil)	Santa Mercedes (São Paulo (state))	15 May 1979 (aged 39)	424	33	28	0	Botafogo	9 January 2015	Free	31 December 2018
18	Guilherme Nunes	DM	(Brazil)	Novo Hamburgo (Rio Grande do Sul)	12 February 1998 (aged 20)	5	0	–	–	Youth System	5 February 2018	Free	1 May 2023
19	Léo Cittadini	CM/AM	(Brazil)	Rio Claro (São Paulo (state))	27 February 1994 (aged 24)	81	2	–	–	Youth System	3 June 2013	Free	31 December 2018
21	Diego Pituca	CM/DM	(Brazil)	Mogi Guaçu (São Paulo (state))	1 August 1992 (aged 26)	42	1	–	–	Botafogo-SP	29 May 2017	Undisc.	31 May 2021
22	Bryan Ruiz	AM/SS	(Costa Rica)	San José	18 August 1985 (aged 33)	14	0	112	24	Sporting (Portugal)	11 July 2018	Free	31 December 2020
25	Yuri	DM/CB	(Brazil)	São Paulo (São Paulo (state))	5 August 1994 (aged 24)	58	1	–	–	Audax	1 January 2018	R$ 800K	31 December 2020
32	Gabriel Calabres	CM/AM	(Brazil)	Matão (São Paulo (state))	8 March 1998 (aged 20)	4	0	–	–	Youth System	5 February 2018	Free	31 October 2019
Forwards
9	Rodrygo	SS/AM	(Brazil)	Osasco (São Paulo (state))	9 January 2001 (aged 17)	62	12	–	–	Youth System	21 July 2017	Free	31 December 2022
10	Gabriel	SS/ST	(Brazil)	São Bernardo (São Paulo (state))	30 August 1996 (aged 22)	210	84	4	2	Internazionale (Italy)	25 January 2018	Loan	31 December 2018
11	Bruno Henrique	SS	(Brazil)	Belo Horizonte (Minas Gerais)	30 December 1990 (aged 27)	87	20	–	–	VfL Wolfsburg (Germany)	23 January 2017	R$ 13.5M	31 January 2021
17	Derlis González	SS	(Paraguay)	Mariano Roque Alonso	20 March 1994 (aged 24)	18	1	29	4	Dynamo Kyiv (Ukraine)	31 July 2018	Loan	30 June 2020
20	Felippe Cardoso	ST	(Brazil)	São Paulo (São Paulo (state))	4 October 1998 (aged 20)	4	1	–	–	Ponte Preta	4 September 2018	Loan	31 December 2023
23	Arthur Gomes	SS	(Brazil)	Uberlândia (Minas Gerais)	3 July 1998 (aged 20)	57	7	–	–	Youth System	2 September 2016	Free	30 December 2021
27	Eduardo Sasha	SS/ST	(Brazil)	Porto Alegre (Rio Grande do Sul)	24 February 1992 (aged 26)	48	7	–	–	Internacional	9 January 2018	R$ 2.4M	31 December 2022
29	Yuri Alberto	ST	(Brazil)	S. J. dos Campos (São Paulo (state))	18 March 2001 (aged 17)	19	2	–	–	Youth System	28 July 2017	Free	31 December 2022
36	Jonathan Copete	LW/SS	(Colombia)	Cali	23 January 1988 (aged 30)	120	25	2	0	Atlético Nacional (Colombia)	23 June 2016	R$ 5M	30 June 2021
40	Diogo Vitor	SS/AM	(Brazil)	Coqueiral (Minas Gerais)	11 February 1997 (aged 21)	10	1	–	–	Youth System	4 June 2016	Free	31 December 2021

Source: SantosFC.com.br (for appearances and goals), Wikipedia players' articles (for international appearances and goals), FPF (for contracts). Players in italic are not registered for the Campeonato Paulista

=== Reserve players ===
Note: Flags indicate national team as defined under FIFA eligibility rules; some limited exceptions apply. Players may hold more than one non-FIFA nationality.

No.	Pos.	Nation	Player
26	MF	BRA	Victor Yan
37	DF	BRA	Emerson

No.	Pos.	Nation	Player
15	MF	BRA	Lucas Lourenço
—	FW	BRA	Kaio Jorge

=== Copa Libertadores squad ===
Note: Flags indicate national team as defined under FIFA eligibility rules; some limited exceptions apply. Players may hold more than one non-FIFA nationality.

No.	Pos.	Nation	Player
1	GK	BRA	Vanderlei
2	DF	BRA	Luiz Felipe
3	MF	BRA	Jean Mota
4	DF	BRA	Victor Ferraz
5	MF	BRA	Alison
6	DF	BRA	Gustavo Henrique
7	MF	URU	Carlos Sánchez ^{1}
8	MF	BRA	Renato
9	FW	BRA	Rodrygo
10	FW	BRA	Gabriel
11	FW	BRA	Bruno Henrique
12	GK	BRA	Vladimir
13	FW	BRA	Rodrigão
14	DF	BRA	David Braz
15	FW	COL	Jonathan Copete

No.	Pos.	Nation	Player
16	DF	BRA	Dodô
17	DF	BRA	Daniel Guedes
18	MF	BRA	Guilherme Nunes
19	MF	BRA	Léo Cittadini
20	MF	BRA	Gabriel Calabres ^{1}
21	MF	BRA	Diego Pituca
22	MF	CRC	Bryan Ruiz ^{1}
23	FW	BRA	Arthur Gomes
24	GK	BRA	João Paulo
25	MF	BRA	Yuri ^{1}
26	DF	BRA	Robson Bambu
27	FW	BRA	Eduardo Sasha
28	DF	BRA	Lucas Veríssimo
29	FW	BRA	Yuri Alberto
30	FW	PAR	Derlis González ^{1}

- 1: Vitor Bueno, Emiliano Vecchio, Caju, Diogo Vitor and Matheus Jesus were unregistered, with Carlos Sánchez, Gabriel Calabres, Bryan Ruiz, Yuri and Derlis González being registered in their places, respectively.

=== Appearances and goals ===
No.	Pos.	Nat	Name	Campeonato Brasileiro		Campeonato Paulista		Copa Libertadores		Copa do Brasil		Total	
No.	Pos.	Nat	Name	Apps	Goals	Apps	Goals	Apps	Goals	Apps	Goals	Apps	Goals
1	GK	(Brazil)	Vanderlei	37	0	15	0	8	0	4	0	64	0
12	GK	(Brazil)	Vladimir	1	0	1	0	0	0	0	0	2	0
22	DF	(Brazil)	Caju	0	0	5	0	0	0	0	0	5	0
38	DF	(Brazil)	Daniel Guedes	6+2	0	11	0	6	0	1+2	0	28	0
16	DF	(Brazil)	Dodô	36	1	6	0	5+1	0	3	0	51	1
3	DF	(Brazil)	Romário	0	0	2	0	0	0	0	0	2	0
4	DF	(Brazil)	Victor Ferraz	32	3	4	0	2	0	3	0	41	3
14	DF	(Brazil)	David Braz	13	0	12	0	6	0	1	0	32	0
6	DF	(Brazil)	Gustavo Henrique	27+2	1	4	0	2+1	0	3+1	1	40	2
28	DF	(Brazil)	Lucas Veríssimo	14	0	10	1	7	1	2	0	33	2
2	DF	(Brazil)	Luiz Felipe	11+2	0	5+1	0	1	0	2	0	22	0
35	DF	(Brazil)	Robson Bambu	8+1	0	2+1	0	0+1	0	0	0	13	0
5	MF	(Brazil)	Alison	28	0	13	0	7	0	2	0	50	0
26	MF	(Brazil)	Anderson Ceará	0+1	0	0	0	0	0	0	0	1	0
22	MF	(Costa Rica)	Bryan Ruiz	3+9	0	0	0	0+2	0	0	0	14	0
20	MF	(Argentina)	Emiliano Vecchio	0+2	0	11	0	2+1	0	1	0	17	0
21	MF	(Brazil)	Diego Pituca	29+5	1	0	0	3	0	3	0	40	1
32	MF	(Brazil)	Gabriel Calabres	0+1	0	0+1	0	0	0	0+1	0	3	0
18	MF	(Brazil)	Guilherme Nunes	2	0	1+1	0	0+1	0	0	0	5	0
3	MF	(Brazil)	Jean Mota	16+4	2	7+5	0	6+1	0	2+1	0	42	2
30	MF	(Brazil)	Leandro Donizete	0	0	0+1	0	0	0	0	0	1	0
19	MF	(Brazil)	Léo Cittadini	4+8	0	5+2	0	3+1	0	0	0	23	0
15	MF	(Brazil)	Lucas Lourenço	0+1	0	0	0	0	0	0	0	1	0
44	MF	(Brazil)	Matheus Jesus	0	0	2+2	0	0	0	0	0	4	0
7	MF	(Uruguay)	Pato Sánchez	16	4	0	0	2	0	0	0	18	4
8	MF	(Brazil)	Renato	8+9	1	9	1	2+2	0	2	0	32	2
26	MF	(Brazil)	Victor Yan	0	0	0+1	0	0	0	0	0	1	0
7	MF	(Brazil)	Vitor Bueno	2+3	0	1+7	0	1+3	0	1+1	0	19	0
25	MF	(Brazil)	Yuri	4+2	0	0	0	0	0	1+1	0	8	0
23	FW	(Brazil)	Arthur Gomes	4+9	0	10+6	3	1+4	1	2+1	0	36	4
11	FW	(Brazil)	Bruno Henrique	19+9	1	1	0	2	0	2	1	33	2
17	FW	(Paraguay)	Derlis González	8+8	1	0	0	1+1	0	0	0	18	1
40	FW	(Brazil)	Diogo Vitor	0	0	2+5	1	0+1	0	0	0	8	1
27	FW	(Brazil)	Eduardo Sasha	19+6	1	10+4	4	4+1	2	1+1	0	46	7
20	FW	(Brazil)	Felippe Cardoso	3+1	1	0	0	0	0	0	0	4	1
10	FW	(Brazil)	Gabriel	34+1	18	8	4	7	1	3	4	53	27
36	FW	(Colombia)	Jonathan Copete	3+15	1	8+1	0	3+1	0	1+1	0	33	1
15	FW	(Brazil)	Kaio Jorge	0+1	0	0	0	0	0	0	0	1	0
22	FW	(Brazil)	Rodrigão	0	0	4+1	1	0	0	0	0	5	1
9	FW	(Brazil)	Rodrygo	30+5	8	5+7	3	6+1	1	3	0	57	12
29	FW	(Brazil)	Yuri Alberto	1+7	0	2+2	1	0+1	0	1+1	1	15	2

Last updated: 3 December 2018
Source: Match reports in Competitive matches, Soccerway

=== Goalscorers ===
Ran	No.	Pos	Nat	Name	Brasileirão	Paulistão	Copa Libertadores	Copa do Brasil	Total
1	10	FW	(Brazil)	Gabriel	18	4	1	4	27
2	9	FW	(Brazil)	Rodrygo	8	3	1	0	12
3	27	FW	(Brazil)	Eduardo Sasha	1	4	2	0	7
4	23	FW	(Brazil)	Arthur Gomes	0	3	1	0	4
4	7	MF	(Uruguay)	Pato Sánchez	4	0	0	0	4
5	4	DF	(Brazil)	Victor Ferraz	3	0	0	0	3
6	11	FW	(Brazil)	Bruno Henrique	1	0	0	1	2
6	6	DF	(Brazil)	Gustavo Henrique	1	0	0	1	2
6	3	MF	(Brazil)	Jean Mota	2	0	0	0	2
6	28	DF	(Brazil)	Lucas Veríssimo	0	1	1	0	2
6	8	MF	(Brazil)	Renato	1	1	0	0	2
6	29	FW	(Brazil)	Yuri Alberto	0	1	0	1	2
7	17	FW	(Paraguay)	Derlis González	1	0	0	0	1
7	21	MF	(Brazil)	Diego Pituca	1	0	0	0	1
7	40	FW	(Brazil)	Diogo Vitor	0	1	0	0	1
7	16	DF	(Brazil)	Dodô	1	0	0	0	1
7	20	FW	(Brazil)	Felippe Cardoso	1	0	0	0	1
7	36	FW	(Colombia)	Jonathan Copete	1	0	0	0	1
7	13	FW	(Brazil)	Rodrigão	0	1	0	0	1
Own goals					2	0	0	1	3
Total					46	19	6	8	79

Last updated: 3 December 2018
Source: Match reports in Competitive matches

=== Disciplinary record ===
N	Nat	Pos	Name	Brasileirão			Paulista			Libertadores			Copa do Brasil			Total		
N	Nat	Pos	Name	Yellow card	(yellow card) (yellow-red card)	Red card	Yellow card	(yellow card) (yellow-red card)	Red card	Yellow card	(yellow card) (yellow-red card)	Red card	Yellow card	(yellow card) (yellow-red card)	Red card	Yellow card	(yellow card) (yellow-red card)	Red card
5	(Brazil)	MF	Alison	12	0	0	8	0	0	3	0	0	1	0	0	24	0	0
10	(Brazil)	FW	Gabriel	9	0	0	3	0	0	2	1	0	3	0	0	17	1	0
28	(Brazil)	DF	Lucas Veríssimo	2	0	1	1	0	0	5	0	0	0	0	0	8	0	1
16	(Brazil)	DF	Dodô	6	0	0	0	0	0	1	1	0	1	0	0	8	1	0
6	(Brazil)	DF	Gustavo Henrique	7	0	0	2	0	0	1	0	0	1	0	0	11	0	0
21	(Brazil)	MF	Diego Pituca	6	1	0	0	0	0	0	0	0	0	0	0	6	1	0
14	(Brazil)	DF	David Braz	3	0	0	5	0	0	1	0	0	0	0	0	9	0	0
19	(Brazil)	MF	Léo Cittadini	2	0	0	1	0	0	2	1	0	0	0	0	5	1	0
3	(Brazil)	MF	Jean Mota	5	0	0	3	0	0	0	0	0	0	0	0	8	0	0
11	(Brazil)	FW	Bruno Henrique	6	0	0	0	0	0	0	0	0	1	0	0	7	0	0
7	(Uruguay)	MF	Pato Sánchez	2	0	1	0	0	0	1	0	0	0	0	0	3	0	1
38	(Brazil)	DF	Daniel Guedes	1	0	0	3	0	0	1	0	0	1	0	0	6	0	0
17	(Paraguay)	FW	Derlis González	5	0	0	0	0	0	1	0	0	0	0	0	6	0	0
2	(Brazil)	DF	Luiz Felipe	5	0	0	1	0	0	0	0	0	0	0	0	6	0	0
4	(Brazil)	DF	Victor Ferraz	6	0	0	0	0	0	0	0	0	0	0	0	6	0	0
12	(Brazil)	GK	Vladimir	0	0	0	0	0	0	0	0	0	1	1	0	1	1	0
36	(Colombia)	FW	Jonathan Copete	0	0	0	3	0	0	0	0	0	1	0	0	4	0	0
25	(Brazil)	MF	Yuri	4	0	0	0	0	0	0	0	0	0	0	0	4	0	0
23	(Brazil)	FW	Arthur Gomes	1	0	0	2	0	0	0	0	0	0	0	0	3	0	0
20	(Argentina)	MF	Emiliano Vecchio	0	0	0	2	0	0	1	0	0	0	0	0	3	0	0
35	(Brazil)	DF	Robson Bambu	3	0	0	0	0	0	0	0	0	0	0	0	3	0	0
9	(Brazil)	FW	Rodrygo	1	0	0	1	0	0	1	0	0	0	0	0	3	0	0
27	(Brazil)	FW	Eduardo Sasha	1	0	0	1	0	0	0	0	0	0	0	0	2	0	0
8	(Brazil)	MF	Renato	1	0	0	1	0	0	0	0	0	0	0	0	2	0	0
1	(Brazil)	GK	Vanderlei	0	0	0	0	0	0	2	0	0	0	0	0	2	0	0
22	(Brazil)	DF	Caju	0	0	0	1	0	0	0	0	0	0	0	0	1	0	0
40	(Brazil)	FW	Diogo Vitor	0	0	0	1	0	0	0	0	0	0	0	0	1	0	0
44	(Brazil)	MF	Matheus Jesus	0	0	0	1	0	0	0	0	0	0	0	0	1	0	0
3	(Brazil)	DF	Romário	0	0	0	1	0	0	0	0	0	0	0	0	1	0	0
7	(Brazil)	MF	Vitor Bueno	0	0	0	0	0	0	1	0	0	0	0	0	1	0	0
29	(Brazil)	FW	Yuri Alberto	1	0	0	0	0	0	0	0	0	0	0	0	1	0	0
TOTALS				89	1	2	41	0	0	23	3	0	10	1	0	163	5	2

As of 3 December 2018
Source: Campeonato Paulista (yellow card) = Number of bookings; (yellow card) (yellow-red card) = Number of sending offs after a second yellow card; (red card) = Number of sending offs by a direct red card.

=== Suspensions served ===
Date	Matches Missed	Player	Reason	Opponents Missed	Competition	Source
30 December 2017	5	Bruno Henrique	(red card) vs Barcelona (Ecuador)	Real Garcilaso (Peru) (A); Nacional (Uruguay) (H); Estudiantes (Argentina) (A); Estudiantes (Argentina) (H); Nacional (Uruguay) (A)	Copa Libertadores	
4 February	1	Alison	3x (yellow card)	Ferroviária (A)	Campeonato Paulista	
4 February	1	Jonathan Copete	3x (yellow card)	Ferroviária (A)	Campeonato Paulista	
14 February	1	David Braz	3x (yellow card)	São Paulo (A)	Campeonato Paulista	
25 February	1	Gabriel	3x (yellow card)	Corinthians (H)	Campeonato Paulista	
7 March	1	Alison	3x (yellow card)	São Bento (H)	Campeonato Paulista	
15 March	1	Gabriel	(red card) vs Nacional (Uruguay)	Estudiantes (Argentina) (A)	Copa Libertadores	
24 April	1	Lucas Veríssimo	3x (yellow card)	Nacional (Uruguay) (A)	Copa Libertadores	
1 May	1	Léo Cittadini	(red card) vs Nacional (Uruguay)	Real Garcilaso (Peru) (H)	Copa Libertadores	
10 June	1	Lucas Veríssimo	(red card) vs Internacional	Fluminense (A)	Campeonato Brasileiro	
13 June	1	Diego Pituca	3x (yellow card)	Palmeiras (H)	Campeonato Brasileiro	
19 July	1	Alison	3x (yellow card)	Chapecoense (A)	Campeonato Brasileiro	
22 July	1	Jean Mota	3x (yellow card)	Flamengo (H)	Campeonato Brasileiro	
22 July	1	David Braz	3x (yellow card)	Flamengo (H)	Campeonato Brasileiro	
4 August	1	Dodô	3x (yellow card)	Ceará (A)	Campeonato Brasileiro	
18 August	1	Alison	3x (yellow card)	Bahia (H)	Campeonato Brasileiro	
18 August	1	Victor Ferraz	3x (yellow card)	Bahia (H)	Campeonato Brasileiro	
21 August	1	Dodô	(red card) vs Independiente (Argentina)	Independiente (H)	Copa Libertadores	
25 August	1	Bruno Henrique	3x (yellow card)	Vasco da Gama (A)	Campeonato Brasileiro	
16 September	1	Derlis González	3x (yellow card)	Cruzeiro (A)	Campeonato Brasileiro	
16 September	1	Gustavo Henrique	3x (yellow card)	Cruzeiro (A)	Campeonato Brasileiro	
27 September	1	Gabriel	3x (yellow card)	Atlético Paranaense (H)	Campeonato Brasileiro	
5 October	1	Alison	3x (yellow card)	Corinthians (H)	Campeonato Brasileiro	
22 October	1	Gustavo Henrique	3x (yellow card)	Fluminense (H)	Campeonato Brasileiro	
22 October	1	Luiz Felipe	3x (yellow card)	Fluminense (H)	Campeonato Brasileiro	
27 October	1	Robson Bambu	3x (yellow card)	Palmeiras (A)	Campeonato Brasileiro	
3 November	1	Gabriel	3x (yellow card)	Chapecoense (H)	Campeonato Brasileiro	
3 November	1	Victor Ferraz	3x (yellow card)	Chapecoense (H)	Campeonato Brasileiro	
3 November	1	Diego Pituca	(red card) vs Palmeiras	Chapecoense (H)	Campeonato Brasileiro	
15 November	1	Yuri	3x (yellow card)	América Mineiro (A)	Campeonato Brasileiro	
21 November	1	Bruno Henrique	3x (yellow card)	Botafogo (H)	Campeonato Brasileiro	
24 November	1	Gabriel	3x (yellow card)	Sport (A)	Campeonato Brasileiro	
24 November	1	Dodô	3x (yellow card)	Sport (A)	Campeonato Brasileiro	
24 November	1	Alison	3x (yellow card)	Sport (A)	Campeonato Brasileiro	
24 November	1	Pato Sánchez	(red card) vs Atlético Mineiro	Sport (A)	Campeonato Brasileiro	

=== Injuries ===
Date	Pos.	Name	Injury	Note	Recovery time
17 January	FW	(Brazil) Bruno Henrique	Retina injury	Match against Linense	3 months
17 January	DF	(Brazil) Lucas Veríssimo	Thigh injury	Match against Linense	1 month
25 January	MF	(Brazil) Yuri	Toe fractury	During training	11 weeks
28 January	DF	(Brazil) Cléber Reis	Thigh injury	During training	1 month
28 January	DF	(Brazil) Victor Ferraz	Shoulder strain	Match against Ituano	2 months
4 February	DF	(Brazil) Luiz Felipe	Thigh edema	Match against Palmeiras	12 days
4 February	FW	(Brazil) Eduardo Sasha	Concussion	Match against Palmeiras	1 day
24 March	MF	(Brazil) Léo Cittadini	Thigh injury	During training	1 week
21 April	FW	(Brazil) Bruno Henrique	Thigh injury	Match against Bahia	1 month
21 April	FW	(Brazil) Eduardo Sasha	Ankle injury	Match against Bahia	2 weeks
1 May	DF	(Brazil) David Braz	Calf injury	Match against Nacional	2 weeks
6 May	MF	(Argentina) Emiliano Vecchio	Tendinitis	During training	3 days
6 May	MF	(Brazil) Renato	Mialgia	During training	2 weeks
8 May	MF	(Brazil) Guilherme Nunes	Thigh injury	During training	3 weeks
10 May	MF	(Brazil) Léo Cittadini	Ankle injury	During training	2 weeks
17 May	FW	(Brazil) Arthur Gomes	Ankle injury	Match against Luverdense	2 months
20 May	MF	(Brazil) Alison	Knee injury	Match against São Paulo	3 weeks
23 May	DF	(Brazil) Victor Ferraz	Low back pain		1 week
24 May	MF	(Brazil) Vitor Bueno	Ankle sprain	Match against Real Garcilaso	18 days
25 May	MF	(Argentina) Emiliano Vecchio	Knee pain	During training	1 month
25 May	FW	(Colombia) Jonathan Copete	Hip pain	During training	5 days
27 May	DF	(Brazil) Lucas Veríssimo	Muscle discomfort	During training	3 days
27 May	FW	(Brazil) Bruno Henrique	Hip trauma	Match against Cruzeiro	10 days
3 June	FW	(Brazil) Yuri Alberto	Shoulder dislocation	During training	3 weeks
4 June	DF	(Brazil) Daniel Guedes	Conjunctivitis		1 week
10 June	FW	(Brazil) Eduardo Sasha	Sprained ankle	Match against Internacional	2 weeks
3 July	FW	(Brazil) Gabriel	Pubis injury	During training	2 weeks
3 July	DF	(Brazil) Lucas Veríssimo	Myalgia	During training	2 weeks
3 July	MF	(Brazil) Alison	Sprained ankle	During training	2 weeks
16 July	DF	(Brazil) Daniel Guedes	Viral disease		1 week
19 July	FW	(Brazil) Rodrygo	Knee injury	Match against Palmeiras	1 week
25 July	DF	(Brazil) Lucas Veríssimo	Lumbar contracture	Match against Flamengo	2 weeks
29 July	FW	(Brazil) Eduardo Sasha	Ankle injury	Match against América Mineiro	2 weeks
15 August	DF	(Brazil) Luiz Felipe	Thigh injury	Match against Cruzeiro	3 weeks
28 August	DF	(Brazil) Lucas Veríssimo	Thigh injury	Match against Independiente	5 weeks
16 September	FW	(Brazil) Felippe Cardoso	Pubis injury	Match against São Paulo	2 months
30 September	DF	(Brazil) Robson Bambu	Thigh injury	Match against Atlético Paranaense	3 weeks
3 November	DF	(Brazil) Luiz Felipe	Calf injury	Match against Palmeiras	16 days
6 November	DF	(Brazil) Lucas Veríssimo	Knee injury	During training	
18 November	FW	(Brazil) Bruno Henrique	Knee injury	Match against América Mineiro	
27 November	FW	(Paraguay) Derlis González	Thigh injury	During training	
27 November	MF	(Costa Rica) Bryan Ruiz	Viral disease		
30 November	GK	(Brazil) Vladimir	Shoulder injury	During training	

=== Squad number changes ===
Player	Position	Old n.	New n.	Prev. to wear	Notes	Source
(Brazil) Bruno Henrique	FW	27	11	(Brazil) Kayke		
(Brazil) Rodrigão	FW	22	13	(Brazil) Matheus Ribeiro		
(Brazil) Emerson	DF	42	37	(Brazil) Zeca		
(Brazil) Gabriel Calabres	MF	16	32	(Argentina) Fabián Noguera		
(Brazil) Jean Mota	MF	39	3	(Brazil) Romário		
(Brazil) Rodrygo	FW	43	9	(Brazil) Ricardo Oliveira		

== Managers ==
Name	Nat.	Place of birth	Date of birth (age)	Signed from	Date signed	Role	Departure	Manner	Contract End
Jair Ventura	(Brazil)	Rio de Janeiro (Rio de Janeiro (state))	19 March 1979 (age 47)	Botafogo	3 January 2018	Permanent	23 July 2018	Sacked	31 December 2018
Serginho Chulapa	(Brazil)	São Paulo (São Paulo (state))	23 December 1953 (age 72)	Staff	23 July 2018	Interim	30 July 2018	Ended tenure	31 December 2018
Cuca	(Brazil)	Curitiba (Paraná (state))	7 June 1963 (age 63)	Free agent	30 July 2018	Permanent	2 December	Mutual consent	31 December 2019

== Transfers ==
=== Transfers in ===
N.	Pos.	Name	Age	Moving from	Type	Fee	Source
3	LB	(Brazil) Romário	26	Ceará	Transfer	Free	
25	DM	(Brazil) Yuri	23	Audax	Transfer	R$ 800,000	
21	AM	(Brazil) Lucas Lourenço	16	Youth setup (Note: Definitely promoted from the youth setup.)	Transfer	Free	
26	DM	(Brazil) Victor Yan	16	Youth setup	Transfer	Free	
42	CB	(Brazil) Matheus Guedes	18	Youth setup	Transfer	Free	
35	CB	(Brazil) Robson Bambu	20	Youth setup	Transfer	Free	
37	LB	(Brazil) Emerson	19	Youth setup	Transfer	Free	
27	FW	(Brazil) Eduardo Sasha	26	Internacional	Transfer	R$ 2,4M (Note: Initially, this amount was paid to acquire 100% of Zeca's rights and then trade him for Sasha.)	
22	MF	(Costa Rica) Bryan Ruiz	32	Sporting (Portugal)	Transfer	Free	
7	MF	(Uruguay) Pato Sánchez	33	Monterrey (Mexico)	Transfer	Free	

=== Loans in ===
N.	Pos.	Name	Age	Loaned from	Loan expires	Fee	Source
27	FW	(Brazil) Eduardo Sasha	25	Internacional	December 2018	Free	
10	FW	(Brazil) Gabriel	21	Internazionale (Italy)	December 2018	R$6,6M	
16	LB	(Brazil) Dodô	26	Sampdoria (Italy)	December 2018	R$ 1M	
17	FW	(Paraguay) Derlis González	24	Dynamo Kyiv (Ukraine)	June 2020	Free	
20	FW	(Brazil) Felippe Cardoso	19	Ponte Preta	December 2023	Free	

=== Transfers out ===
N.	Pos.	Name	Age	Moving to	Type	Fee	Source
10	AM	(Brazil) Lucas Lima	27	Palmeiras	End of contract	Free	
11	ST	(Brazil) Kayke	29	Yokohama Marinos (Japan)	Loan return	Free	
35	SS	(Brazil) Lucas Crispim	23	São Bento	End of contract	Free	
26	SS	(Brazil) Thiago Ribeiro	31	Free agent	End of contract	Free	
18	ST	(Brazil) Nilmar	33	Free agent	Contract terminated	Free	
9	ST	(Brazil) Ricardo Oliveira	37	Atlético Mineiro	End of contract	Free	
–	GK	(Brazil) Gabriel Gasparotto	24	Arouca (Portugal)	End of contract	Free	
–	AM	(Brazil) Marquinhos	28	São Bento	End of contract	Free	
16	LW	(Colombia) Vladimir Hernández	28	Atlético Nacional (Colombia)	Transfer	R$4,8M	
44	DM	(Brazil) Matheus Jesus	20	Gamba Osaka (Japan)	Loan rescinded	Free	
37	LB	(Brazil) Zeca	23	Internacional	Swapped (Note: Included in Eduardo Sasha transfer.)	Free	
41	AM	(Brazil) Serginho	23	Kashima Antlers (Japan)	Transfer	R$7,7M	

=== Loans out ===
N.	P	Name	Age	Loaned to	Loan expires	Source
21	AM	(Brazil) Matheus Oliveira	20	Red Bull Brasil	April 2018	
13	RB	(Brazil) Matheus Ribeiro	24	Puebla (Mexico)	December 2018	
15	LB	(Brazil) Orinho	22	Ponte Preta	December 2018	
–	DM	(Brazil) Lucas Otávio	23	Ituano	May 2018	
32	CB	(Argentina) Fabián Noguera	24	Estudiantes (Argentina)	December 2018	
41	AM	(Brazil) Serginho	22	América Mineiro	December 2018	
3	LB	(Brazil) Romário	26	Ceará	December 2018	
31	CB	(Brazil) Cléber Reis	27	Paraná	December 2018	
13	ST	(Brazil) Rodrigão	24	Avaí	December 2018	
30	DM	(Brazil) Leandro Donizete	35	América Mineiro	December 2018	
17	AM	(Brazil) Rafael Longuine	27	Guarani	December 2018	
21	AM	(Brazil) Matheus Oliveira	20	Guarani	December 2018	
22	LB	(Brazil) Caju	22	APOEL (Cyprus)	June 2019	
7	AM	(Brazil) Vitor Bueno	23	Dynamo Kyiv (Ukraine)	June 2020	
14	CB	(Brazil) David Braz	31	Sivasspor (Turkey)	May 2019	
20	AM	(Argentina) Emiliano Vecchio	29	Shabab Al-Ahli (United Arab Emirates)	June 2019	

== Pre-season and Friendlies ==
7 July Friendly	Monterrey (Mexico)	1–0	Santos	Guadalupe
20:00 UTC-06:00	Vangioni (yellow card) 5'; Hurtado 12'	Report	(yellow card) 72' Rodrygo	Stadium: BBVA Bancomer; Referee: (Mexico) Alejandro Villafañe

10 July Friendly	Querétaro (Mexico)	0–0	Santos	Querétaro City
20:00 UTC-06:00	Gómez (yellow card) 15'	Report	(yellow card) 86' (yellow-red card) 86' Dodô; (yellow card) 90+1' Victor Ferraz	Stadium: Corregidora

== Competitions ==
=== Overview ===
Competition	First match	Last match	Starting round	Final position	Record							
Competition	First match	Last match	Starting round	Final position	Pld	W	D	L	GF	GA	GD	Win %
Série A	14 April 2018	2 December 2018	Matchday 1	10th	38	13	11	14	46	40	+6	34.21
Copa do Brasil	10 May 2018	15 August 2018	Round of 16	Quarterfinals	4	2	0	2	8	5	+3	50.00
Campeonato Paulista	17 January 2018	27 March 2018	Matchday 1	Semifinals	16	6	5	5	19	15	+4	37.50
Copa Libertadores	1 March 2018	28 August 2018	Group stage	Round of 16	8	3	3	2	6	4	+2	37.50
Total					66	24	19	23	79	64	+15	36.36

Source: Competitions

=== Campeonato Brasileiro ===
==== Results summary ====
Overall								Home						Away					
Pld	W	D	L	GF	GA	GD	Pts	W	D	L	GF	GA	GD	W	D	L	GF	GA	GD
38	13	11	14	46	40	+6	50	9	6	4	28	14	+14	4	5	10	18	26	−8

Last updated: 3 December 2018.
Source: Soccerway

==== Results by round ====
Round	1	2	3	4	5	6	7	8	9	10	11	12	13	14	15	16	17	18	19	20	21	22	23	24	25	26	27	28	29	30	31	32	33	34	35	36	37	38
Ground	H	A	A	H	A	H	A	H	A	H	A	H	A	H	H	A	A	A	H	H	A	H	A	H	A	H	H	A	H	A	H	A	H	A	A	H	H	A
Result	W	L	L	W	L	L	L	W	D	L	W	D	D	D	L	D	D	L	W	W	W	D	W	D	L	D	W	W	W	D	W	L	L	L	L	D	W	L
Position	3	9	16	13	15	16	18	15	15	16	15	15	15	15	17	17	15	17	13	12	10	10	8	9	11	11	8	7	7	7	7	7	8	9	10	10	10	10

Updated to match(es) played on 3 December 2018. Source: Globo Esporte
W = Win; D = Draw; L = Loss

==== League table ====
Pos	Team	Pld	W	D	L	GF	GA	GD	Pts	Qualification or relegation
8	Cruzeiro	38	14	11	13	34	34	0	53	Qualification for Copa Libertadores group stage (Note: Cruzeiro qualified for the Copa Libertadores group stage by winning the 2018 Copa do Brasil.)
9	Botafogo	38	13	12	13	38	46	−8	51	Qualification for Copa Sudamericana first stage
10	Santos	38	13	11	14	46	40	+6	50	Qualification for Copa Sudamericana first stage
11	Bahia	38	12	12	14	39	41	−2	48	Qualification for Copa Sudamericana first stage
12	Fluminense	38	12	9	17	32	46	−14	45	Qualification for Copa Sudamericana first stage

Source: CBF
Rules for classification: 1) points; 2) wins; 3) goal difference; 4) goals scored; 5) head-to-head results; 6) least red cards received; 7) least yellow cards received; 8) draw.

==== Matches ====
14 April 1	Santos	2–0	Ceará	São Paulo
21:00 UTC-03:00	Pio 42' (o.g.); Rodrygo 50'	Report	(yellow card) 2' Rafael Carioca	Stadium: Pacaembu; Attendance: 15,513; Referee: Rodrigo D'Alonso Ferreira

21 April 2	Bahia	1–0	Santos	Salvador
16:00 UTC-03:00	Nino Paraíba (yellow card) 31'; Douglas Friedrich (yellow card) 38'; Régis (yellow card) 90'; Júnior Brumado 90+4'; Marco Antonio (yellow card) 90+4'	Report	(yellow card) 13' Léo Cittadini; (yellow card) 38' David Braz; (yellow card) 71' Dodô	Stadium: Arena Fonte Nova; Attendance: 15,588; Referee: Cláudio Francisco Lima e Silva

6 May 4	Grêmio	5–1	Santos	Porto Alegre
19:00 UTC-03:00	Maicon 31', 55'; Éverton 45+2'; André 70'; Arthur 80'; Ramiro (yellow card) 90+1'	Report	(yellow card) 23' Dodô; 33' Jean Mota; (yellow card) 42' Lucas Veríssimo; (yellow card) 61' Alison	Stadium: Arena do Grêmio; Attendance: 25,779; Referee: Pericles Bassols Pegado Cortez

13 May 5	Santos	3–1	Paraná	Santos
19:00 UTC-03:00	Rodrygo 47'; Gabriel (yellow card) 54' (goal) 59', 76'	Report	(yellow card) 36' González; (yellow card) 87' Vitor Feijão; 90+3' Silvinho	Stadium: Vila Belmiro; Attendance: 3,971; Referee: Wagner Reway

20 May 6	São Paulo	1–0	Santos	São Paulo
16:00 UTC-03:00	Anderson Martins (yellow card) 46' (yellow-red card) 90+2'; Éder Militão (yellow card) 55'; Diego Souza 56'; Reinaldo (yellow card) 71'; Hudson (yellow card) 90+3'	Report	(yellow card) 88' Yuri Alberto; (yellow card) 90+5' David Braz	Stadium: Morumbi; Attendance: 40,465; Referee: Braulio da Silva Machado

27 May 7	Santos	0–1	Cruzeiro	São Paulo
16:00 UTC-03:00	Diego Pituca (yellow card) 60'	Report	(yellow card) 18' Henrique; (yellow card) 55' Egídio; 75' Bruno Silva; (yellow card) 76' Edílson; (yellow card) 78' Robinho	Stadium: Pacaembu; Attendance: 10,670; Referee: Paulo Roberto Alves Júnior
Note: Edílson was booked on the bench, after being replaced

31 May 8	Atlético Paranaense	2–0	Santos	Curitiba
21:00 UTC-03:00	Thiago Heleno 18'; Guilherme 54'; Pablo (yellow card) 55'	Report	(yellow card) 86' Bruno Henrique	Stadium: Arena da Baixada; Attendance: 9,173; Referee: Savio Pereira

3 June 9	Santos	5–2	Vitória	Santos
16:00 UTC-03:00	Rodrygo 22', 26', 31'; Renato 45'; Gabriel 74'	Report	(yellow card) 14' Wallyson; (yellow card) 19' Rodrigo Andrade; (yellow card) 61' Kanu; 63' Neílton; (yellow card) 81' Lucas Marques; 84' Ramon	Stadium: Vila Belmiro; Attendance: 3,887; Referee: Rodrigo D'Alonso Ferreira

6 June 10	Corinthians	1–1	Santos	São Paulo
21:00 UTC-03:00	Roger 52' (yellow card) 52'; Kazim (yellow card) 68'; Romero (yellow card) 90+3'	Report	75' (yellow card) 76' Victor Ferraz; (yellow card) 90+3' Lucas Veríssimo	Stadium: Arena Corinthians; Attendance: 27,586; Referee: Ricardo Marques Ribeiro
Note: Kazim was booked on the bench

10 June 11	Santos	1–2	Internacional	Santos
19:00 UTC-03:00	Jean Mota (yellow card) 28'; Diego Pituca (yellow card) 36'; Gabriel 51' (pen.); Lucas Veríssimo (red card) 54'; Bruno Henrique (yellow card) 75'	Report	33' (pen.) Leandro Damião; (yellow card) 45+4' William Pottker; (yellow card) 47' Edenílson; 53' Cuesta; (yellow card) 90' Rossi; (yellow card) 90+2' Rodrigo Dourado	Stadium: Vila Belmiro; Attendance: 8,124; Referee: Wagner do Nascimento Magalhães

13 June 12	Fluminense	0–1	Santos	Rio de Janeiro
19:00 UTC-03:00	Douglas (yellow card) 17'; Mateus Norton (yellow card) 39'	Report	(yellow card) 42' Diego Pituca; (yellow card) 45+1' Alison; (yellow card) 77' Renato; 86' Bruno Henrique	Stadium: Maracanã; Attendance: 7,438; Referee: Rafael Traci

19 July 13	Santos	1–1	Palmeiras	São Paulo
20:00 UTC-03:00	Alison (yellow card) 24'; Jean Mota (yellow card) 32'; Rodrygo (yellow card) 44'; Gustavo Henrique 75'; Léo Cittadini (yellow card) 87'	Report	6' (yellow card) 7' Lucas Lima; (yellow card) 15' Felipe Melo; (yellow card) 45' Deyverson; (yellow card) 56' Antônio Carlos; (yellow card) 62' Hyoran; (yellow card) 74' Gustavo Scarpa	Stadium: Pacaembu; Attendance: 26,417; Referee: Dewson Fernando Freitas da Silva
Note: Deyverson was booked on the bench

22 July 14	Chapecoense	0–0	Santos	Chapecó
19:00 UTC-03:00	Wellington Paulista (yellow card) 5'	Report	(yellow card) 12' Jean Mota; (yellow card) 54' Eduardo Sasha; (yellow card) 66' David Braz; (yellow card) 86' Arthur Gomes	Stadium: Arena Condá; Attendance: 7,100; Referee: Wagner Reway

25 July 15	Santos	1–1	Flamengo	Santos
21:45 UTC-03:00	Gabriel 33'; Luiz Felipe (yellow card) 55'	Report	2' Éverton Ribeiro; (yellow card) 54' Diego	Stadium: Vila Belmiro; Attendance: 11,843; Referee: Jailson Macêdo Freitas

29 July 16	Santos	0–1	América Mineiro	Santos
19:00 UTC-03:00	Alison (yellow card) 70'; Gustavo Henrique (yellow card) 90+4'	Report	39' (pen.) Ruy; (yellow card) 68' Carlinhos; (yellow card) 82' Juninho	Stadium: Vila Belmiro; Attendance: 8,691; Referee: Rafael Traci

4 August 17	Botafogo	0–0	Santos	Rio de Janeiro
16:00 UTC-03:00	Matheus Fernandes (yellow card) 25'	Report	(yellow card) 15' Alison; (yellow card) 45+1' Luiz Felipe; (yellow card) 65' Dodô; (yellow card) 67' Gustavo Henrique; (yellow card) 90+3' Derlis González	Stadium: Engenhão; Attendance: 6,940; Referee: Paulo Roberto Alves Júnior

8 August 20	Ceará	1–1	Santos	Fortaleza
19:30 UTC-03:00	Edinho (yellow card) 42'; Arthur 78'; Leandro Carvalho (yellow card) 83'; Ricardinho (yellow card) 90+3'	Report	(yellow card) 70' (goal) 87' Jean Mota; (yellow card) 83' Victor Ferraz	Stadium: Presidente Vargas; Attendance: 18,047; Referee: Marcelo de Lima Henrique

12 August 18	Atlético Mineiro	3–1	Santos	Belo Horizonte
11:00 UTC-03:00	Elias 8' (yellow card) 43'; Ricardo Oliveira 71', 90+5'; Iago Maidana (yellow card) 73'	Report	27' Gabriel	Stadium: Independência; Attendance: 22,062; Referee: Rodrigo D'Alonso Ferreira

18 August 19	Santos	3–0	Sport	Santos
16:00 UTC-03:00	Eduardo Sasha 2'; Victor Ferraz (yellow card) 45+1' (goal) 84'; Derlis González (yellow card) 45+2'; Alison (yellow card) 53'; Rodrygo 82'	Report	(yellow card) 28' (yellow-red card) 57' Rogério; (yellow card) 69' Morato; (yellow card) 71' Cláudio Winck	Stadium: Vila Belmiro; Attendance: 10,991; Referee: Dewson Fernando Freitas da Silva

25 August 21	Santos	2–0	Bahia	Santos
16:00 UTC-03:00	Bruno Henrique (yellow card) 14'; Derlis González 57'; Gabriel 75'	Report	(yellow card) 10' Elton; (yellow card) 59' Douglas Grolli	Stadium: Vila Belmiro; Attendance: 11,564; Referee: Héber Roberto Lopes

1 September 22	Vasco da Gama	0–3	Santos	Rio de Janeiro
19:00 UTC-03:00	Maxi López (yellow card) 41'	Report	5', 67', 82' Gabriel; (yellow card) 23' Dodô	Stadium: Maracanã; Attendance: 33,646; Referee: Braulio da Silva Machado

6 September 23	Santos	0–0	Grêmio	São Paulo
19:00 UTC-03:00	Alison (yellow card) 6'; Daniel Guedes (yellow card) 47'	Report	(yellow card) 90+2' Marcelo Grohe	Stadium: Pacaembu; Attendance: 16,083; Referee: Wilton Pereira Sampaio

9 September 24	Paraná	0–2	Santos	Curitiba
19:00 UTC-03:00	Carlos (yellow card) 27'; Renê (yellow card) 32'; Alex Santana (yellow card) 53'; Jhonny Lucas (yellow card) 81'	Report	52', 78' (yellow card) 53' Gabriel; (yellow card) 57' Yuri; (yellow card) 65' Robson Bambu	Stadium: Vila Capanema; Attendance: 5,177; Referee: Dewson Fernando Freitas da Silva

16 September 25	Santos	0–0	São Paulo	Santos
16:00 UTC-03:00	Robson Bambu (yellow card) 46'; Derlis González (yellow card) 67'; Diego Pituca (yellow card) 69'; Alison (yellow card) 77'; Bruno Henrique (yellow card) 86'; Gustavo Henrique (yellow card) 90+5'; Victor Ferraz (yellow card) 90+6'	Report	(yellow card) 5' Bruno Alves; (yellow card) 42' Arboleda; (yellow card) 52' Hudson; (yellow card) 81' Joao Rojas	Stadium: Vila Belmiro; Attendance: 13,488; Referee: Ricardo Marques Ribeiro

23 September 26	Cruzeiro	2–1	Santos	Belo Horizonte
19:00 UTC-03:00	Murilo Cerqueira (yellow card) 34'; Sassá 46'; Raniel 83'; Egídio (yellow card) 90+5'	Report	16' Gabriel; (yellow card) 73' Victor Ferraz; (yellow card) 83' Dodô	Stadium: Mineirão; Attendance: 9,029; Referee: Braulio da Silva Machado

27 September 3	Santos	1–1	Vasco da Gama	São Paulo
20:00 UTC-03:00	Gabriel (yellow card) 1'; Diego Pituca 44'	Report	(yellow card) 18' Fabrício; (yellow card) 22' Bruno Cosendey; (yellow card) 70' (yellow-red card) 87' Andrey; 79' Ríos	Stadium: Pacaembu; Attendance: 12,985; Referee: Wagner Reway

30 September 27	Santos	1–0	Atlético Paranaense	Santos
16:00 UTC-03:00	Gustavo Henrique (yellow card) 53'; Sánchez 90+7' (pen.) (yellow card) 90+7'	Report	(yellow card) 18' Paulo André; (yellow card) 33' Lucho González; (yellow card) 80' Nikão; (yellow card) 90+4' Léo Pereira; (yellow card) 90+5' Márcio Azevedo; (yellow card) 90+9' Marcelo Cirino	Stadium: Vila Belmiro; Attendance: 7,802; Referee: Caio Max Augusto Vieira

5 October 28	Vitória	0–1	Santos	Salvador
21:30 UTC-03:00	Ramon (yellow card) 21'; Fabiano (yellow card) 74'; Rhayner (yellow card) 76'; Maurício (red card) 82'	Report	8' (yellow card) 73' Sánchez; (yellow card) 29' Alison	Stadium: Barradão; Attendance: 7,478; Referee: Daniel Nobre Bins

13 October 29	Santos	1–0	Corinthians	São Paulo
19:00 UTC-03:00	Gabriel (yellow card) 14' (goal) 21'; Gustavo Henrique (yellow card) 39'; Derlis González (yellow card) 80'	Report	(yellow card) 43' Emerson Sheik; (yellow card) 56' Pedro Henrique; (yellow card) 80' Gabriel	Stadium: Pacaembu; Attendance: 26,428; Referee: Pericles Bassols Pegado Cortez

22 October 30	Internacional	2–2	Santos	Porto Alegre
20:00 UTC-03:00	Nico López (yellow card) 20'; Leandro Damião 44'; Patrick 71'	Report	(yellow card) 45+2' Gustavo Henrique; 50' Gabriel; (yellow card) 53' Bruno Henrique; 79' (o.g.) Fabiano; (yellow card) 86' Luiz Felipe	Stadium: Beira-Rio; Attendance: 43,159; Referee: Ricardo Marques Ribeiro

27 October 31	Santos	3–0	Fluminense	Santos
16:30 UTC-03:00	Robson Bambu (yellow card) 24'; Gabriel (yellow card) 73' (goal) 84' (pen.); Victor Ferraz 88'; Sánchez 89'	Report	(yellow card) 5' Airton; (yellow card) 87' Marlon; (yellow card) 90+1' Fernando Neto	Stadium: Vila Belmiro; Attendance: 8,680; Referee: Heber Roberto Lopes

3 November 32	Palmeiras	3–2	Santos	São Paulo
19:00 UTC-03:00	Dudu 14' (yellow card) 90+1'; Edu Dracena (yellow card) 34' (goal) 40'; Lucas Lima (yellow card) 51'; Victor Luis 71'	Report	(yellow card) 7' Luiz Felipe; (yellow card) 22' Derlis González; (yellow card) 23' Gabriel; 55' Copete; (yellow card) 57' Victor Ferraz; 65' Dodô; (yellow card) 70' (yellow-red card) 80' Diego Pituca	Stadium: Allianz Parque; Attendance: 38,938; Referee: Braulio da Silva Machado

12 November 33	Santos	0–1	Chapecoense	São Paulo
20:00 UTC-02:00	Alison (yellow card) 56'; Yuri (yellow card) 77'	Report	29' Leandro Pereira; (yellow card) 89' Márcio Araújo	Stadium: Pacaembu; Attendance: 12,659; Referee: Rafael Traci

15 November 34	Flamengo	1–0	Santos	Rio de Janeiro
17:00 UTC-02:00	Rodinei (yellow card) 52'; Henrique Dourado 73'; Pará (yellow card) 77'; Diego (yellow card) 90+3'	Report	(yellow card) 45+1' Yuri; (yellow card) 77' Gabriel; (yellow card) 78' Alison; (yellow card) 84' Jean Mota; (yellow card) 90+4' Gustavo Henrique	Stadium: Maracanã; Attendance: 46,067; Referee: Paulo Roberto Alves Júnior

18 November 35	América Mineiro	2–1	Santos	Belo Horizonte
17:00 UTC-02:00	Norberto (yellow card) 25'; Rafael Moura 31' (yellow card) 45+2'; Zé Ricardo (yellow card) 42'; Luan (yellow card) 45+2'; Matheusinho 65'; Christian Savio (yellow card) 90'; João Ricardo (yellow card) 90+4'	Report	45+1' Gabriel; (yellow card) 61' Bruno Henrique	Stadium: Independência; Attendance: 4,652; Referee: Dewson Fernando Freitas da Silva

21 November 36	Santos	1–1	Botafogo	Santos
21:00 UTC-02:00	Rodrygo 36'; Gabriel (yellow card) 67'; Luiz Felipe (yellow card) 88'	Report	(yellow card) 25' Marcinho; 59' Brenner Marlos; (yellow card) 89' Matheus Fernandes	Stadium: Vila Belmiro; Attendance: 3,620; Referee: Heber Roberto Lopes

24 November 37	Santos	3–2	Atlético Mineiro	Santos
20:00 UTC-02:00	Sánchez 2' (red card) 77'; Felippe Cardoso 34'; Gabriel 37' (yellow card) 37'; Dodô (yellow card) 58'; Alison (yellow card) 61'; Diego Pituca (yellow card) 64'	Report	17', 53' Ricardo Oliveira; (yellow card) 65' Cazares	Stadium: Vila Belmiro; Attendance: 4,591; Referee: Leandro Vuaden

2 December 38	Sport	2–1	Santos	Recife
17:00 UTC-02:00	Adryelson (yellow card) 65'; Andrigo (yellow card) 79'; Rogério 84' (yellow card) 86'; Hernane 90+2'	Report	(yellow card) 25' Yuri; 90+4' Rodrygo	Stadium: Ilha do Retiro; Attendance: 23,451; Referee: Anderson Daronco

=== Copa do Brasil ===
==== Round of 16 ====
10 May 1st leg	Santos	5–1	Luverdense	Santos
21:45 UTC-03:00	Gabriel 25', 63', 68' (yellow card) 48'; Gustavo Henrique 59'; Alison (yellow card) 62'; Yuri Alberto 86'	Report	11' Itaqui; (yellow card) 31' Rafael Silva; (yellow card) 42' Paulinho; (yellow card) 70' André Ribeiro; (yellow card) 85' Moisés	Stadium: Vila Belmiro; Attendance: 3,590; Referee: Marcelo de Lima Henrique

17 May 2nd leg	Luverdense	2–1 (3–6 agg.)	Santos	Lucas do Rio Verde
19:15 UTC-03:00	Paulo Renê (yellow card) 24' (goal) 32'; Itaqui 47'	Report	16' (o.g.) Paulinho; (yellow card) 71' Copete; (yellow card) 87' Daniel Guedes	Stadium: Passo das Emas; Attendance: 2,313; Referee: Grazziani Maciel Rocha

==== Quarter-final ====
1 August 1st leg	Santos	0–1	Cruzeiro	Santos
19:30 UTC-03:00	Gabriel (yellow card) 79'	Report	(yellow card) 45+2' Henrique; 81' Raniel; (yellow card) 89' Rafael Sóbis; (yellow card) 90+2' Rafinha	Stadium: Vila Belmiro; Attendance: 7,134; Referee: Wilton Pereira Sampaio

15 August 2nd leg	Cruzeiro	1–2 (2–2 agg.) (3–0 p)	Santos	Belo Horizonte
19:30 UTC-03:00	Thiago Neves 12'; Edílson (yellow card) 90+2'	Report	42' (yellow card) 90+2' Gabriel; (yellow card) 79' Gustavo Henrique; 84' (yellow card) 90+2' Bruno Henrique; (yellow card) 85' (yellow-red card) 90+5' Vladimir; (yellow card) 90+5' Dodô	Stadium: Mineirão; Attendance: 59,513; Referee: Rodolpho Toski Marques
	Penalties
	Lucas Silva (penalty scored); Raniel (penalty scored); David (penalty scored)		(penalty missed) Bruno Henrique; (penalty missed) Rodrygo; (penalty missed) Jean Mota
Note: Vladimir was booked on the bench

=== Campeonato Paulista ===
==== Results summary ====
Overall								Home						Away					
Pld	W	D	L	GF	GA	GD	Pts	W	D	L	GF	GA	GD	W	D	L	GF	GA	GD
16	6	5	5	19	15	+4	23	2	3	3	7	7	0	4	2	2	12	8	+4

Last updated: 27 March 2018.
Source: Globo Esporte

==== Group stage ====
Pos	Team	Pld	W	D	L	GF	GA	GD	Pts	Qualification
1	Santos	12	5	3	4	17	13	+4	18	knockout stage
2	Botafogo-SP	12	4	4	4	9	11	−2	16	knockout stage
3	Red Bull Brasil	12	2	7	3	10	11	−1	13	
4	Mirassol	12	2	6	4	9	13	−4	12	

Source: Soccerway

==== Matches ====
17 January 1	Linense	0–3	Santos	Lins
19:30 UTC-02:00	Bileu (yellow card) 20'	Report	21', 56' Arthur Gomes; (yellow card) 24' Renato; (yellow card) 36' Romário; 45+2' Rodrigão; (yellow card) 85' Alison	Stadium: Gilbertão; Attendance: 5,866; Referee: Luiz Flávio de Oliveira

22 January 2	Santos	0–1	Bragantino	Santos
20:00 UTC-02:00	David Braz (yellow card) 78'; Alison (yellow card) 80'; Jean Mota (yellow card) 88'	Report	(yellow card) 73' Fabiano; 82' Guilherme Mattis; (yellow card) 87' Bruno Sávio	Stadium: Vila Belmiro; Attendance: 7,508; Referee: Salim Fende Chavez

25 January 3	Ponte Preta	1–2	Santos	Campinas
19:30 UTC-02:00	Leo Melo 9'; Tiago Real (yellow card) 25'; Marciel (yellow card) 38'; Renan Fonseca (yellow card) 42'; Jeferson (yellow card) 45+2'; Ronaldo (yellow card) 69'; Marquinhos (yellow card) 80'	Report	(yellow card) 10' Copete; (yellow card) 38' Vecchio; (yellow card) 64' David Braz; 74' Eduardo Sasha; 90+1' Rodrygo	Stadium: Moisés Lucarelli; Attendance: 2,032; Referee: Flavio Rodrigues de Souza

28 January 4	Santos	1–1	Ituano	São Paulo
19:30 UTC-02:00	Copete (yellow card) 15'; Matheus Jesus (yellow card) 38'; Rodrygo 90+1'	Report	17' Gabriel Baralhas; (yellow card) 68' Tony; (yellow card) 78' Claudinho; (yellow card) 84' Juninho; (yellow card) 88' Marcos Serrato	Stadium: Pacaembu; Attendance: 13,609; Referee: Vinicius Furlan

4 February 5	Palmeiras	2–1	Santos	São Paulo
17:00 UTC-02:00	Antônio Carlos 2'; Lucas Lima (yellow card) 26'; Tchê Tchê (yellow card) 45+2'; Borja 50'; Felipe Melo (yellow card) 73'; Victor Luis (yellow card) 90'	Report	(yellow card) 6' Caju; (yellow card) 37' Arthur Gomes; 62' Renato; (yellow card) 72' Alison; (yellow card) 80' Copete	Stadium: Allianz Parque; Attendance: 37,867; Referee: Flavio Rodrigues de Souza

10 February 6	Ferroviária	2–2	Santos	Araraquara
16:30 UTC-02:00	Hygor (yellow card) 42'; Léo Castro 64'; Luan 77'; Welinton (yellow card) 80'; Moacir (yellow card) 83'; Marco Damasceno (yellow card) 90+5'	Report	29' Eduardo Sasha; (yellow card) 61' Daniel Guedes; (yellow card) 65' (goal) 66' Gabriel; (yellow card) 85' Jean Mota; (yellow card) 90' Rodrygo	Stadium: Fonte Luminosa; Attendance: 3,861; Referee: Marcelo Aparecido Ribeiro de Souza

14 February 7	Santos	2–0	São Caetano	Santos
19:30 UTC-02:00	Lucas Veríssimo 34'; Gabriel 46'; David Braz (yellow card) 48'	Report	(yellow card) 15' Chiquinho; (yellow card) 55' Alex Reinaldo	Stadium: Vila Belmiro; Attendance: 4,165; Referee: Vinicius Furlan

18 February 8	São Paulo	0–1	Santos	São Paulo
17:00 UTC-03:00	Petros (yellow card) 23'; Reinaldo (yellow card) 86'; Éder Militão (yellow card) 90'	Report	54' (yellow card) 65' Gabriel; (yellow card) 68' Alison; (yellow card) 90+2' Arthur Gomes	Stadium: Morumbi; Attendance: 36,118; Referee: Raphael Claus

25 February 9	Santos	2–0	Santo André	Santos
19:30 UTC-03:00	Léo Cittadini (yellow card) 22'; Gabriel 74' (yellow card) 76'; Eduardo Sasha 88'; Alison (yellow card) 90+3'	Report	(yellow card) 12' Domingos; (yellow card) 83' Flávio Medeiros	Stadium: Vila Belmiro; Attendance: 6,687; Referee: Flávio Rodrigues de Souza

4 March 10	Santos	1–1	Corinthians	São Paulo
17:00 UTC-03:00	David Braz (yellow card) 45+3'; Diogo Vitor 87' (yellow card) 88'; Vecchio (yellow card) 89'	Report	20' Renê Júnior; (yellow card) 45+2' Clayson; (yellow card) 77' Gabriel; (yellow card) 90+1' Balbuena	Stadium: Pacaembu; Attendance: 37,431; Referee: Luiz Flavio de Oliveira

7 March 11	Novorizontino	2–1	Santos	Novo Horizonte
19:30 UTC-03:00	Juninho 20'; Safira (yellow card) 25'; Lucas Veríssimo 60' (o.g.); Jean Patrick (yellow card) 61' (yellow-red card) 67'; Rafael Ratão (yellow card) 65'; Thallyson (yellow card) 79'; Oliveira (yellow card) 86'; Tony (yellow card) 90+4'	Report	(yellow card) 48' Gustavo Henrique; 54' Yuri Alberto; (yellow card) 81' Alison	Stadium: Jorge Ismael de Biasi; Attendance: 5,426; Referee: Leandro Bizzio Marinho

11 March 12	Santos	1–3	São Bento	Santos
17:00 UTC-03:00	Arthur Gomes 45+1' (pen.); Luiz Felipe (yellow card) 72'; Gustavo Henrique (yellow card) 90+5'	Report	44' (pen.) Marcelo Cordeiro; 79' Lúcio Flávio; (yellow card) 90+3' Lucas Farias; 90+5' Fábio Bahia	Stadium: Vila Belmiro; Attendance: 3,816; Referee: Vinicius Furlan

==== Knockout stage ====
===== Quarter-final =====
18 March 1st leg	Botafogo–SP	0–0	Santos	Ribeirão Preto
19:30 UTC-03:00	Dodô (yellow card) 23'; Plínio (yellow card) 65'	Report	(yellow card) 81' Jean Mota	Stadium: Santa Cruz; Attendance: 11,933; Referee: Raphael Claus

21 March 2nd leg	Santos	0–0 (0–0 agg.) (3–1 p)	Botafogo–SP	Santos
19:30 UTC-03:00		Report	(yellow card) 59' Diones; (yellow card) 90+3' Lucas Taylor	Stadium: Vila Belmiro; Attendance: 6,209; Referee: Leandro Bizzio Marinho
	Penalties
	Gabriel (penalty scored); Vitor Bueno (penalty missed); Diogo Vitor (penalty scored); Lucas Veríssimo (penalty missed); Arthur Gomes (penalty scored)		(penalty scored) Jheimy; (penalty missed) Bruno Moraes; (penalty missed) Dodô; (penalty missed) Willian

===== Semi-final =====
24 March 1st leg	Santos	0–1	Palmeiras	São Paulo
19:00 UTC-03:00	Daniel Guedes (yellow card) 32'; Alison (yellow card) 42'	Report	12' Willian; (yellow card) 34' Antônio Carlos; (yellow card) 90+1' Thiago Santos; (yellow card) 90+5' Dudu	Stadium: Pacaembu; Attendance: 19,546; Referee: Flávio Rodrigues de Souza

27 March 2nd leg	Palmeiras	1–2 (2–2 agg.) (5–3 p)	Santos	São Paulo
20:30 UTC-03:00	Bruno Henrique 17'; Willian (yellow card) 38'; Felipe Melo (yellow card) 50'	Report	13' (yellow card) 37' Eduardo Sasha; (yellow card) 15' Alison; 39' Rodrygo; (yellow card) 41' Lucas Veríssimo; (yellow card) 45' David Braz; (yellow card) 84' Daniel Guedes	Stadium: Pacaembu; Attendance: 36,591; Referee: Marcelo Aparecido Ribeiro de Souza
	Penalties
	Dudu (penalty scored); Tchê Tchê (penalty scored); Victor Luis (penalty scored); Moisés (penalty scored); Guerra (penalty scored)		(penalty scored) Gabriel; (penalty scored) Jean Mota; (penalty missed) Diogo Vitor; (penalty scored) Arthur Gomes

=== Copa Libertadores ===
==== Group stage ====
Pos	Team	Pld	W	D	L	GF	GA	GD	Pts	Qualification
1	(Brazil) Santos	6	3	1	2	6	4	+2	10	Round of 16
2	(Argentina) Estudiantes	6	2	2	2	6	4	+2	8	Round of 16
3	(Uruguay) Nacional	6	2	2	2	7	6	+1	8	Copa Sudamericana
4	(Peru) Real Garcilaso	6	1	3	2	2	7	−5	6	

Source: CONMEBOL

1 March 1	Real Garcilaso (Peru)	2–0	(Brazil) Santos	Cusco, Peru
17:15 UTC−05:00	Vidales 8'; Dulanto (yellow card) 39'; Ramúa 89'	Report	(yellow card) 22' Vecchio; (yellow card) 39' Lucas Veríssimo; (yellow card) 90' Vitor Bueno	Stadium: Estadio Garcilaso; Attendance: 35,190; Referee: (Bolivia) Gery Vargas

15 March 2	Santos (Brazil)	3–1	(Uruguay) Nacional	São Paulo
19:15 UTC−03:00	Rodrygo (yellow card) 12' (goal) 48'; Gabriel (yellow card) 13' (yellow-red card) 44'; Léo Cittadini (yellow card) 17'; Eduardo Sasha 20', 83'; Vanderlei (yellow card) 90+1'	Report	(yellow card) 12' (goal) 82' Oliva; (yellow card) 14' Romero; (yellow card) 19' Corujo; (yellow card) 41' Polenta; (yellow card) 90' Peruzzi	Stadium: Pacaembu; Attendance: 20,982; Referee: (Paraguay) Ulises Mereles

5 April 3	Estudiantes (Argentina)	0–1	(Brazil) Santos	Quilmes, Argentina
21:30 UTC−03:00	Campi (yellow card) 83'	Report	19' Arthur Gomes; (yellow card) 32' Lucas Veríssimo; (yellow card) 83' David Braz; (yellow card) 87' Vanderlei	Stadium: Estadio Centenario Ciudad de Quilmes; Attendance: 27,904; Referee: (Ecuador) Roddy Zambrano

24 April 4	Santos (Brazil)	2–0	(Argentina) Estudiantes	Santos
21:30 UTC−03:00	Alison (yellow card) 7'; Gabriel 44'; Lucas Veríssimo 50' (yellow card) 90+2'	Report	(yellow card) 10' Dubarbier; (yellow card) 45+1' Campi; (yellow card) 49' Gómez; (yellow card) 72' (yellow-red card) 90+3' Escobar; (yellow card) 89' Lattanzio	Stadium: Vila Belmiro; Attendance: 10,969; Referee: (Paraguay) Eber Aquino

1 May 5	Nacional (Uruguay)	1–0	(Brazil) Santos	Montevideo, Uruguay
21:30 UTC−03:00	Barcia 58' (yellow card) 90+2'; De Pena (yellow card) 81'; Romero (yellow card) 86'	Report	(yellow card) 78' (yellow-red card) 90+3' Léo Cittadini; (yellow card) 82' Alison	Stadium: Gran Parque Central; Attendance: 26,500; Referee: (Colombia) Wilmar Roldán

24 May 6	Santos (Brazil)	0–0	(Peru) Real Garcilaso	Santos
19:15 UTC−03:00	Daniel Guedes (yellow card) 71'; Lucas Veríssimo (yellow card) 85'	Report	(yellow card) 63' Morales; (yellow card) 71' Cossio; (yellow card) 89' Arismendi	Stadium: Vila Belmiro; Attendance: 5,016; Referee: (Venezuela) Alexis Herrera

==== Knockout stage ====
===== Round of 16 =====
21 August 1st Leg	Independiente (Argentina)	0–0	(Brazil) Santos	Avellaneda, Argentina
21:45 UTC−03:00	Silva (yellow card) 25'; Bustos (yellow card) 27'; Cerutti (yellow card) 48'; Campaña (yellow card) 72'; Gastón Silva (yellow card) 90'	Report	(yellow card) 19' Sánchez; (yellow card) 30' Lucas Veríssimo; (yellow card) 71' (yellow-red card) 82' Dodô; (yellow card) 90+1' Gabriel	Stadium: Estadio Libertadores de América; Referee: (Peru) Diego Haro
Note: The match was awarded 3–0 to Independiente because Santos fielded an ineligible player, Sánchez, as he was suspended but did appear in the match.

28 August 2nd Leg	Santos (Brazil)	0–0 (0–3 agg.)	(Argentina) Independiente	São Paulo
19:30 UTC−03:00	González (yellow card) 40'; Gustavo Henrique (yellow card) 58'; Alison (yellow card) 59'	Report	(yellow card) 19' Bustos; (yellow card) 55' Brítez	Stadium: Pacaembu; Attendance: 33,642; Referee: (Chile) Julio Bascuñán
