= Luan =

Luan may refer to:

== Places ==
- Lu'an, a city in Anhui, China
- Luan County, Hebei, China
- Luan River, Hebei, China

== Other uses ==
- Luan (surname), a Chinese surname
- Luan (mythology), a legendary bird in Chinese mythology
- Trees in the genus Shorea, sometimes known as Philippine mahogany
  - Plywood, made from luan trees and others in the family Dipterocarpaceae

== People with the given name ==
=== Men ===
- Luan Andrade (born 1990), Brazilian footballer
- Luan de Bruin (born 1993), South African rugby union player
- Luan (footballer, born 1987) (Luan Bueno), Brazilian footballer
- Luan Cândido (born 2001), Brazilian footballer
- Luan Capanni (born 2000), Brazilian footballer
- Luan Carlos (born 1992), Brazilian football manager
- Luan Chagas (born 1989), Brazilian mixed martial artist
- Luan Dias (born 1997), Brazilian footballer
- Luan Freitas (born 2001), Brazilian footballer
- Luan Garcia (born 1993), Brazilian footballer
- Luan (footballer, born 1990) (Luan Madson Gedeão de Paiva), Brazilian footballer
- Luan Haradinaj (1973–1997), Kosovo Liberation Army soldier
- Luan Hoxha (born 1960), Albanian military officer, 8th Chief of the General Staff of the Albanian Armed Forces
- Luan Jin, Chinese badminton player
- Luan Kejun (born 1960), Chinese politician
- Luan Krasniqi (born 1971), German-Albanian boxer and actor
- Luan Muller (born 1993), Brazilian futsal player
- Luan Oliveira, Brazilian street skateboarder
- Luan Patrick (born 2002), Brazilian footballer
- Luan Peres (born 1994), Brazilian footballer
- Luan Pinari (born 1977), Albanian footballer
- Luan Polli (born 1993), Brazilian footballer
- Luan Qerimi (1929–2018), Albanian actor
- Luan Rama (diplomat) (born 1952), Albanian diplomat, writer and researcher
- Luan Ribeiro (born 1997), Brazilian footballer
- Luan Rodrigues (born 1996), Brazilian footballer
- Luan Santana (born 1991), Brazilian singer-songwriter
- Luan Santos, multiple people
- Luan Scapolan (born 1988), Portuguese footballer
- Luan Seiti, Albanian footballer
- Luan Sérgio (born 1994), Brazilian footballer
- Luan Silva, multiple people
- Luan Skuqi (born 1951), Albanian politician
- Luan Starova (1941–2022), Albanian writer
- Luan Viana (born 1996), Brazilian footballer
- Luan (footballer, born March 1993) (Luan Vieira), Brazilian footballer
- Luan Vukatana (born 1959), Albanian footballer
- Luan Zhegu (born 1949), Albanian composer and singer
- Luan Zmijani (born 1976), Albanian footballer and manager
- Luan Zylfo (1954–2000), Albanian football referee
- Luan (footballer, born May 1993) (Luan da Conceição Silva), Brazilian footballer
- Luan (footballer, born 1996) (Luan Leite da Silva), Brazilian footballer
- Luan (footballer, born 1999) (Luan Vinícius da Silva Santos), Brazilian footballer

=== Women ===
- Luan Bo (born 1965), Chinese figure skater
- Luan Gabriel (born 1996), Dominican sprinter
- Luan Jujie (born 1958), Chinese-born Canadian fencer
- Luan Parle, Irish musician, songwriter, and producer
- Luan Peters (1946–2017), British actress and singer, born Carol Hirsch
- Luan Zheng (born 1984), Chinese handballer player
- Luan Zhengrong (born 1974), Chinese skier
- Luan Zhili (born 1973), Chinese discusses thrower

=== Characters ===
- Luan Volien Abbott, a character in the soap opera The Young and the Restless
- Luan Loud, a character in the American animated series The Loud House
- Luan, a character in Shovel Knight: Specter of Torment
- Luand'r, a character in the DC Comics universe

== See also ==
- Lauan (disambiguation)
- Luana (disambiguation)
- Luane Dy, Filipino actress and TV host
- "Luanne", a song by Foreigner from the album 4
