= Diogo Vitor =

Brazilian footballer (born 1997)

Personal information
- Full name: Diogo Vitor da Cruz
- Date of birth: 11 February 1997 (age 29)
- Place of birth: Coqueiral, Brazil
- Height: 1.70 m (5 ft 7 in)
- Position: Forward

Team information
- Current team: ASA

Youth career
- 2010–2016: Santos

Senior career*
Years	Team	Apps	(Gls)
2016–2020	Santos	9	(1)
2020–2021	Corinthians	0	(0)
2021	Cruzeiro	0	(0)
2022	Maringá	1	(1)
2022–	ASA	5	(0)
- * Club domestic league appearances and goals as of 16:19, 19 July 2022 (UTC)

Diogo Vitor da Cruz (born 11 February 1997), known as Diogo Vitor, is a Brazilian footballer who plays as a forward for ASA.

== Club career ==
=== Santos ===
Born in Coqueiral, Minas Gerais, Diogo Vitor joined Santos' youth setup in 2010, aged 12; he started his career as a left back, but was later converted to a forward. After progressing through the club's youth setup, he was promoted to the first team by manager Marcelo Fernandes in 2015, but was later demoted back to the under-20s after the arrival of Dorival Júnior.

In January 2016, Diogo Vitor failed to appear in the club's presentation, alleging a toothache. After finally returning to Peixe, he was assigned to the B-side.

On 5 June 2016 Diogo Vitor made his professional debut, coming on as a second-half substitute for Joel in a 3–0 home win against Botafogo for the Série A championship. After more indiscipline problems, he was demoted back to the B-side.

On 15 February 2018, Diogo Vitor renewed his contract until 2021, being definitely promoted to the main squad. On 4 March he scored his first professional goal, netting the equalizer in a 1–1 home draw against Corinthians.

Diogo Vitor made his Copa Libertadores debut on 5 April 2018, replacing Rodrygo in a 1–0 away win against Estudiantes. In March 2020, his contract was rescinded as a just cause, after he failed to appear at the club for the 2020 campaign.

== Doping case ==
On 26 April 2018, Diogo Vitor was caught in a doping exam following a Campeonato Paulista match against Botafogo-SP in March; the prohibited substance was suspected to be cocaine. He returned to training in November 2019, after his 18-month suspension ended.

== Career statistics ==
As of 6 April 2018

Club	Season	League			State League		Cup		Continental		Other		Total	
Club	Season	Division	Apps	Goals	Apps	Goals	Apps	Goals	Apps	Goals	Apps	Goals	Apps	Goals
Santos	2016	Série A	2	0	—		0	0	—		6 (Note: Appearance (s) in Copa Paulista)	1	8	1
Santos	2017	Série A	0	0	—		0	0	—		16	0	16	0
Santos	2018	Série A	0	0	7	1	0	0	1 (Note: Appearance(s) in Copa Libertadores)	0	—		8	1
Santos	Total		2	0	7	1	0	0	1	0	22	1	32	2
Career total			2	0	7	1	0	0	1	0	22	1	32	2
