= Luann =

Luann, or Luanne, usually a feminine name combining the more common Louise and Anne, may refer to:

- Luann (comic strip), a comic strip by Greg Evans centering on teenager Luann DeGroot
- Luanne Platter, a character from King of the Hill TV show
- Luann Van Houten, a character from The Simpsons TV show
- The "Lu Ann Platter", a budget combination platter from the Luby's Texas cafeteria chain

== See also ==
- Lauan (disambiguation), a variant spelling
