= Luana (given name) =

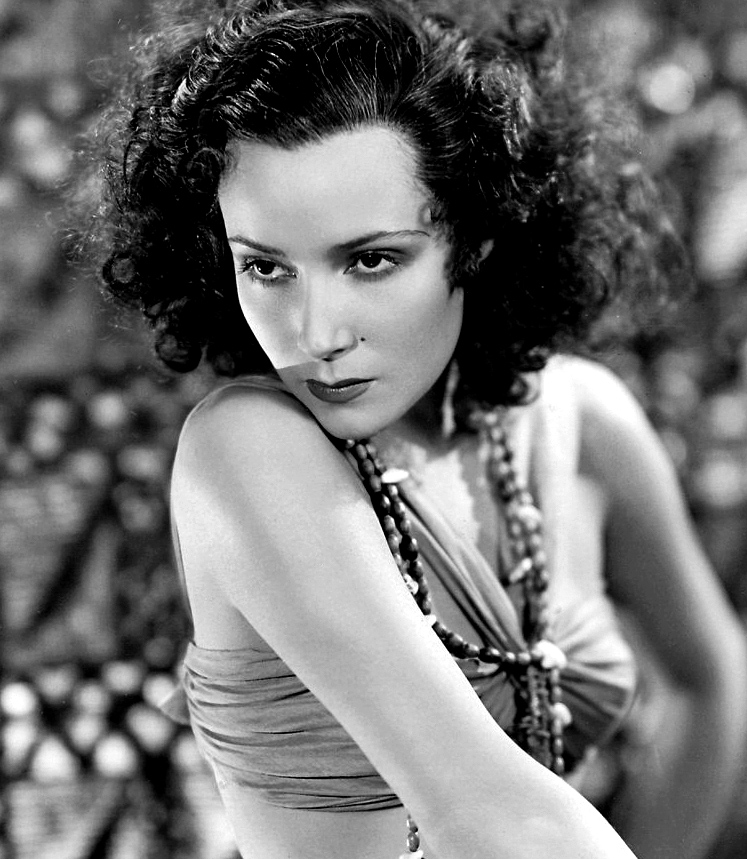
- Dolores del Rio as Luana in Bird of Paradise.
- Gender: Female

Origin
- Meaning: lion in Albanian, combination of Louise or Lucy and Anna or "happiness" in Hawaiian or Spanish "luan" meaning brown tinted with yellow.

Other names
- See also: Anna, Louise, Lua, Luan, Luanus, Lucy.

Luana is a feminine name of undetermined, multiple origins. It was among the top 10 most popular names for baby girls born in Peru in 2020. It is in use in other countries as well. It ranked among the top 50 names used for girls born in Portugal in recent years and was among the top 200 names used for girls born in Italy between 1999 and 2006. It has ranked among the top 500 names given to girls born in France in recent years. There were 95 girls born in the United States in 2020, 110 girls in 2021, 105 girls in 2022, 112 girls in 2023, and 105 girls in 2024 who were given the name. It has also been well used in Switzerland, ranking among the top 30 names for girls in 2020. It also ranked among the top 100 names for girls born in Germany in 2018 and among the top 1,000 names for girls born in the United Kingdom in 2019.

== Origins ==
Usage of the name might have been inspired by characters in theatrical productions and films. It was the name of the Polynesian heroine in the 1932 film Bird of Paradise, which was based on a 1912 play. Luana is also a character in the 1982 Italian film Daughter of the Jungle.

Some sources say the name means "happiness" or having a good time in Hawaiian. It might also be a feminine version of the Albanian name Luàn, meaning "lion". It might also be used as a combination of the names Louise or Lucy and Anna. It might be derived from the Spanish word "luan", meaning a shade between yellow and brown, or as a feminine form of the name Luanus.

== People ==
- Luana Alonso (born 2004), Paraguayan competitive swimmer and Olympian
- Luana Anders (1938–1996), American actress and screenwriter
- Luana Angeloni (born 1952), Italian teacher and politician
- Luàna Bajrami (born 2001), Kosovan-French actress and film maker
- Luana Bertolucci Paixão (born 1993), Brazilian football player
- Luana Carolina (born 1993), Brazilian mixed martial artist
- Luana de Noailles (born 1949), Brazilian model
- Luana Gomes (born 2003), Angolan rhythmic gymnast
- Luana Muñoz (born 1999), Argentine professional footballer
- Countess Luana of Orange-Nassau, Jonkvrouwe van Amsberg (born 2005), member of the Dutch royal family
- Luana Patten (1938–1996) American actress
- Luana Piovani (born 1976), Brazilian actress and former model
- Luana Barbosa dos Reis (1981–2016), victim of police brutality
- Luana Tanaka (born 1989), Brazilian actress
- Luana Walters (1912–1963), American actress
- Luana Volnovich (born 1979), Argentine politician
- Luana Zanella (born 1950), Italian politician

== Places ==
- Luana, Iowa, town in Iowa named in honor of the founder's wife.
