= Gabriel Calabres =

Brazilian footballer (born 1998)

Personal information
- Full name: Gabriel Calabres Nunes
- Date of birth: 8 March 1998 (age 28)
- Place of birth: Matão, Brazil
- Height: 1.84 m (6 ft 0 in)
- Position: Midfielder

Team information
- Current team: Maringá (on loan from Cianorte)
- Number: 32

Youth career
- 2013–2016: São Carlos
- 2016–2018: Santos

Senior career*
Years	Team	Apps	(Gls)
2015–2016	São Carlos	11	(0)
2017–2019	Santos	2	(0)
2019–	Cianorte	32	(2)
2019	→ Chapecoense (loan)	0	(0)
2020	→ Botafogo-SP (loan)	16	(0)
2023–	→ Maringá (loan)	3	(1)
- * Club domestic league appearances and goals as of 21:44, 31 March 2023 (UTC) ‡ National team caps and goals as of 28 October 2017

Gabriel Calabres Nunes (born 8 March 1998) is a Brazilian footballer who plays as a midfielder for Maringá, on loan from Cianorte.

== Club career ==
=== São Carlos ===
Born in Matão, Calabres represented São Carlos as a youth. On 14 June 2015, he made his first team-debut, coming on as a half-time substitute in a 3–1 Campeonato Paulista Segunda Divisão away win against Palmeirinha.

After featuring in eleven matches as his side was crowned champions, Calabres returned to the youth setup for the 2016 Copa São Paulo de Futebol Júnior, only returning to the main squad for the ensuing Copa Paulista.

=== Santos ===
On 12 November 2016, Calabres signed a three-year contract with Santos, returning to youth football. He also featured sparingly for the B team in the following campaign, but returned to the under-20s in 2018 ahead of the year's Copa São Paulo de Juniores.

On 20 January 2018, Calabres was promoted to the first team by new manager Jair Ventura. He made his debut for the main squad on 11 March, replacing Guilherme Nunes in a 3–1 home loss against São Bento.

Calabres made his Série A debut on 8 August 2018, replacing Carlos Sánchez in a 1–1 away draw against Ceará. On 15 April of the following year, after failing to appear under new manager Jorge Sampaoli, he rescinded his contract.

=== Cianorte ===
On 18 April 2019, Calabres was announced at Cianorte for the Série D. On 25 July, after playing eight matches for the side, he moved to top-tier side Chapecoense.

On 27 December 2019, Calabres agreed to a loan deal with Botafogo-SP in the Série B.

== Career statistics ==
As of 31 March 2023

Club	Season	League			State League		Cup		Continental		Other		Total	
Club	Season	Division	Apps	Goals	Apps	Goals	Apps	Goals	Apps	Goals	Apps	Goals	Apps	Goals
São Carlos	2015	Paulista 2ª Divisão	—		11	0	—		—		—		11	0
São Carlos	2016	Paulista A3	—		0	0	—		—		5 (Note: Appearance(s) in Copa Paulista)	0	5	0
São Carlos	Total		—		11	0	—		—		5	0	16	0
Santos	2017	Série A	0	0	—		—		—		8	0	8	0
Santos	2018	Série A	1	0	1	0	1	0	—		3	1	6	1
Santos	2019	Série A	0	0	0	0	0	0	0	0	—		0	0
Santos	Total		1	0	1	0	1	0	0	0	11	1	14	1
Cianorte	2019	Série D	8	0	—		—		—		—		8	0
Cianorte	2021	Série D	4	1	12	0	4	0	—		—		20	1
Cianorte	2022	Série D	8	1	0	0	—		—		—		8	1
Cianorte	Total		20	2	12	0	4	0	—		—		36	2
Chapecoense (loan)	2019	Série A	0	0	—		—		—		—		0	0
Botafogo-SP (loan)	2020	Série B	5	0	11	0	—		—		6	0	22	0
Maringá (loan)	2023	Série D	0	0	3	1	1	0	—		—		4	1
Career total			26	2	38	1	6	0	0	0	22	1	91	4

== Honours ==
São Carlos

- Campeonato Paulista Segunda Divisão: 2015
