= Luana =

Luana may refer to:

- Luana, Iowa, a town in the United States
- Luana, an Italian singer-songwriter, co-founder of Belladonna
- Countess Luana of Orange-Nassau, Jonkvrouwe van Amsberg, member of the Dutch royal family
- Luana the Jungle Girl a.k.a. Luana, the Girl Tarzan (1968), Italian-German film with Mei Chen as Luana, a jungle girl
- Luana/Susan Wilson from Daughter of the Jungle (1982), Italian film with Sabrina Siani as Luana/Susan Wilson
- Luana, by Alan Dean Foster, a 1974 novel based on a film
- Luana, a 1930 Broadway musical by Rudolf Friml
- Luana (footballer), a Brazilian football player
- Luana (given name)
