= Romário (footballer, born March 1992) =

Brazilian footballer (born 1992)

Personal information
- Full name: Romário Guilherme dos Santos
- Date of birth: 13 March 1992 (age 34)
- Place of birth: Diadema, Brazil
- Height: 1.71 m (5 ft 7 1/2 in)
- Position: Left back

Team information
- Current team: ABC

Youth career
- 2009–2011: Audax
- 2010–2011: → Porto (loan)

Senior career*
Years	Team	Apps	(Gls)
2011–2013	Audax	20	(1)
2012	→ Bahia (loan)	3	(0)
2013	→ Audax Rio (loan)	11	(0)
2014–2015	Red Bull Brasil	32	(0)
2015	Avaí	32	(0)
2016	Atlético Goianiense	40	(1)
2017	Ceará	42	(0)
2018–2022	Santos	2	(0)
2018	→ Ceará (loan)	13	(0)
2018	→ Guarani (loan)	6	(0)
2019	→ Red Bull Brasil (loan)	8	(0)
2019	→ Bragantino (loan)	0	(0)
2019	→ Vila Nova (loan)	19	(0)
2020	→ Mirassol (loan)	8	(1)
2020–2021	→ Cuiabá (loan)	31	(0)
2021	→ Coritiba (loan)	21	(0)
2022	→ Operário Ferroviário (loan)	10	(1)
2022	Novorizontino	27	(0)
2023	Santo André	0	(0)
2023	Juventude	5	(0)
2023–	ABC	0	(0)
- * Club domestic league appearances and goals as of 21 May 2023

Romário Guilherme dos Santos (born 13 March 1992), simply known as Romário (Brazilian Portuguese: [ʁoˈmaɾiu]), is a Brazilian footballer who plays as a left back for ABC.

== Club career ==
=== Audax and loans ===
Born in Diadema, São Paulo, Romário began his career at Audax's youth setup. In the 2010 summer he was loaned to F.C. Porto, after a partnership between both clubs was established.

In July 2011 Romário returned to his parent club, and made his debut as a senior in the year's Copa Paulista. On 3 September of the following year he moved to Série A club Bahia, on loan until December.

Romário made his debut in the main category of Brazilian football on 5 September 2012, starting in a 0–0 home draw against Atlético Mineiro. He finished the campaign with three appearances, as his side narrowly avoided relegation.

Romário spent the start of 2013 on loan at Audax Rio.

=== Red Bull Brasil / Avaí ===
On 14 December 2013, after another spell at Audax, Romário signed for Red Bull Brasil. The following 7 May, after impressing with the side in the Campeonato Paulista, he joined Avaí, newly promoted to the main category.

Romário was an undisputed starter for the side, but still suffered relegation.

=== Atlético Goianiense ===
In January 2016, Romário signed for Atlético Goianiense until the end of the year. He featured regularly for Dragão during the year, acting as team captain during the latter stages of the campaign.

Romário scored his first professional goal on 30 August 2016, netting his team's second in a 2–2 home draw against Ceará.

=== Ceará ===
On 7 December 2016, Romário agreed to a one-year deal with Ceará.

=== Santos ===
On 31 October 2017, Santos president Modesto Roma Júnior announced that Romário agreed to a five-year deal with the club, effective as of 1 January. He was officially announced on 4 January 2018.

Romário made his debut for the club on 17 January 2018, starting in a 3–0 home win against Linense. After only two matches for the club, he returned to his previous side Ceará on 10 March, on loan until the end of the year. After being rarely used, he moved to Guarani also in a temporary deal until the end of the year.

On 2 January 2019, Romário was loaned to former club Red Bull until the end of the year's Paulistão. The loan was extended until the end of 2019 with Red Bull Bragantino when that club was formed due to the merger of Red Bull Brasil with Clube Atlético Bragantino.

On 12 July 2019, after failing to appear for RB in the second division, Romário moved to fellow league team Vila Nova also in a temporary deal. On 2 January of the following year, he was loaned to Mirassol for the entire 2020 Campeonato Paulista.

On 25 June 2020, Romário agreed to a loan deal at Cuiabá, until the end of the year's second division. After helping the club in their first-ever promotion, he moved to Coritiba, recently relegated to the second level, on loan until December 2021.

On 8 December 2021, still owned by Santos, Romário moved to fellow second division side Operário Ferroviário for the 2022 season.

=== Novorizontino ===
Romário left Operário on 31 March 2022, and moved to Novorizontino in the same category, after terminating his contract with Santos.

== Career statistics ==
As of 16 September 2022

Club	Season	League			State League		Cup		Continental		Other		Total	
Club	Season	Division	Apps	Goals	Apps	Goals	Apps	Goals	Apps	Goals	Apps	Goals	Apps	Goals
Audax	2011	Paulista A2	—		0	0	—		—		20 (Note: Appearance(s) in Copa Paulista)	0	20	0
Audax	2012	Paulista A2	—		20	1	—		—		—		20	1
Audax	2013	Paulista	—		0	0	—		—		3	0	3	0
Audax	Subtotal		—		20	1	—		—		23	0	43	1
Bahia (loan)	2012	Série A	3	0	—		—		—		—		3	0
Audax Rio (loan)	2013	Carioca	—		11	0	—		—		—		11	0
Red Bull Brasil	2014	Paulista A2	—		18	0	—		—		17	1	35	1
Red Bull Brasil	2015	Paulista	—		14	0	—		—		—		14	0
Red Bull Brasil	Subtotal		—		32	0	—		—		17	1	49	1
Avaí	2015	Série A	32	0	—		0	0	—		—		32	0
Atlético Goianiense	2016	Série B	27	1	13	0	1	0	—		—		41	1
Ceará	2017	Série B	32	0	10	0	1	0	—		2 (Note: Appearance(s) in Primeira Liga)	0	45	0
Santos	2018	Série A	0	0	2	0	0	0	0	0	—		2	0
Ceará (loan)	2018	Série A	8	0	5	0	1	0	—		4 (Note: Appearance(s) in Copa do Nordeste)	0	18	0
Guarani (loan)	2018	Série B	6	0	—		—		—		—		6	0
Red Bull Brasil (loan)	2019	Paulista	—		8	0	—		—		—		8	0
Bragantino (loan)	2019	Série B	0	0	—		—		—		—		0	0
Vila Nova (loan)	2019	Série B	19	0	—		—		—		—		19	0
Mirassol (loan)	2020	Paulista	—		8	1	—		—		—		8	1
Cuiabá (loan)	2020	Série B	27	0	—		3	0	—		1 (Note: Appearance(s) in Copa Verde)	0	31	0
Coritiba (loan)	2021	Série B	12	0	9	0	4	0	—		—		25	0
Operário Ferroviário (loan)	2022	Série B	0	0	10	1	1	0	—		—		11	1
Novorizontino	2022	Série B	22	0	—		—		—		—		22	0
Career total			188	1	128	3	11	0	0	0	47	1	374	5

== Honours ==
Atlético-GO

- Campeonato Brasileiro Série B: 2016

Ceará

- Campeonato Cearense: 2017, 2018

Red Bull Brasil

- Campeonato Paulista do Interior: 2019
