= Guilherme Nunes =

Brazilian footballer (born 1998)

Personal information
- Full name: Guilherme Nunes da Silva
- Date of birth: 12 July 1998 (age 28)
- Place of birth: Novo Hamburgo, Brazil
- Height: 1.79 m (5 ft 10 in)
- Position: Defensive midfielder

Team information
- Current team: Confiança]

Youth career
- 2005–2013: Santa Teresinha
- 2013: Ivoti/Globalfut
- 2014–2018: Santos

Senior career*
Years	Team	Apps	(Gls)
2018–2022	Santos	13	(0)
2019	→ Paraná (loan)	0	(0)
2020	→ Portuguesa (loan)	6	(1)
2021	→ Náutico (loan)	7	(0)
2022	→ Ferroviária (loan)	6	(1)
2022	→ ABC (loan)	10	(0)
2023	Brasil de Pelotas	2	(0)
2023–2024	Aparecidense	41	(0)
2025	Floresta	31	(0)
2026–	Confiança	16	(2)

International career
2015	Brazil U17	5	(0)
2016	Brazil U20	3	(0)
- * Club domestic league appearances and goals as of 11 November 2026

Guilherme Nunes da Silva (born 12 July 1998), known as Guilherme Nunes (Brazilian Portuguese: [ɡiˈʎɛʁmi ˈnunis]) or simply Guilherme, is a Brazilian footballer who plays as a defensive midfielder for Confiança.

== Club career ==
=== Santos ===
Born in Novo Hamburgo, Rio Grande do Sul, Guilherme joined Santos' youth setup in 2014, from lowly locals Ivoti/Globalfut. On 5 November 2015, he signed a professional three-year contract with the club.

On 3 February 2018, Guilherme was promoted to the first team by manager Jair Ventura. He made his senior debut fifteen days later, coming on as a late substitute for Jonathan Copete in a 1–0 Campeonato Paulista away win against São Paulo.

Guilherme made his Copa Libertadores debut on 15 March 2018, replacing fellow youth graduate Léo Cittadini in a 3–1 win against Nacional at the Pacaembu Stadium. On 2 May, he renewed his contract until May 2023.

On 18 November 2018, Guilherme made his Série A debut, starting in a 2–1 loss at América Mineiro, only lasting nine minutes on the field and being replaced by Renato due to an injury. He appeared in one further league match in the season, again being subbed off due to injury.

On 9 September 2019, Guilherme was loaned to Série B side Paraná until the end of the 2020 Campeonato Paranaense. In November, after only two unused substitute appearances, his loan was cut short until the end of the year, and he subsequently returned to Peixe.

On 27 February 2020, Guilherme joined Portuguesa on loan for the remainder of the Campeonato Paulista Série A2. He scored his first senior goal on 7 September, netting his team's second in a 3–2 away loss against XV de Piracicaba.

Upon returning, Guilherme was again only a backup option before moving on loan to Náutico in the second division on 22 June 2021. On 3 February of the following year, he moved to Ferroviária also in a temporary deal until the end of the 2022 Campeonato Paulista.

On 12 April 2022, Guilherme was loaned to Série C side ABC until the end of the season.

=== Brasil de Pelotas ===
On 2 January 2023, Guilherme Nunes moved to Brasil de Pelotas until the end of the 2023 Campeonato Gaúcho.

=== Aparecidense ===
On 16 June 2023, Guilherme moved to Série C side Aparecidense until the end of the season.

== International career ==
On 16 September 2015, Guilherme was called up to Brazil under-17s for the year's FIFA U-17 World Cup. He featured for the under-20s the following year, being also called up to complete trainings during the Summer Olympics.

== Career statistics ==
As of 16 October 2023

Club	Season	League			State League		Cup		Continental		Other		Total	
Club	Season	Division	Apps	Goals	Apps	Goals	Apps	Goals	Apps	Goals	Apps	Goals	Apps	Goals
Santos	2018	Série A	2	0	2	0	0	0	1 (Note: Appearance(s) in Copa Libertadores)	0	—		5	0
Santos	2019	Série A	0	0	0	0	0	0	0	0	—		0	0
Santos	2020	Série A	4	0	0	0	0	0	1	0	—		5	0
Santos	2021	Série A	0	0	3	0	0	0	0	0	—		3	0
Santos	Total		6	0	5	0	0	0	2	0	—		13	0
Paraná (loan)	2019	Série B	0	0	—		—		—		—		0	0
Portuguesa (loan)	2020	Paulista A2	—		6	1	—		—		—		6	1
Náutico (loan)	2021	Série B	7	0	—		—		—		—		7	0
Ferroviária (loan)	2022	Série D	0	0	6	1	1	0	—		—		7	1
ABC (loan)	2022	Série C	10	0	—		—		—		—		10	0
Brasil de Pelotas	2023	Série D	2	0	10	0	4	0	—		—		16	0
Aparecidense	2023	Série C	10	0	—		—		—		—		10	0
Career total			35	0	27	2	5	0	2	0	0	0	69	2
