= Arthur Gomes (footballer) =

Brazilian footballer (born 1998)

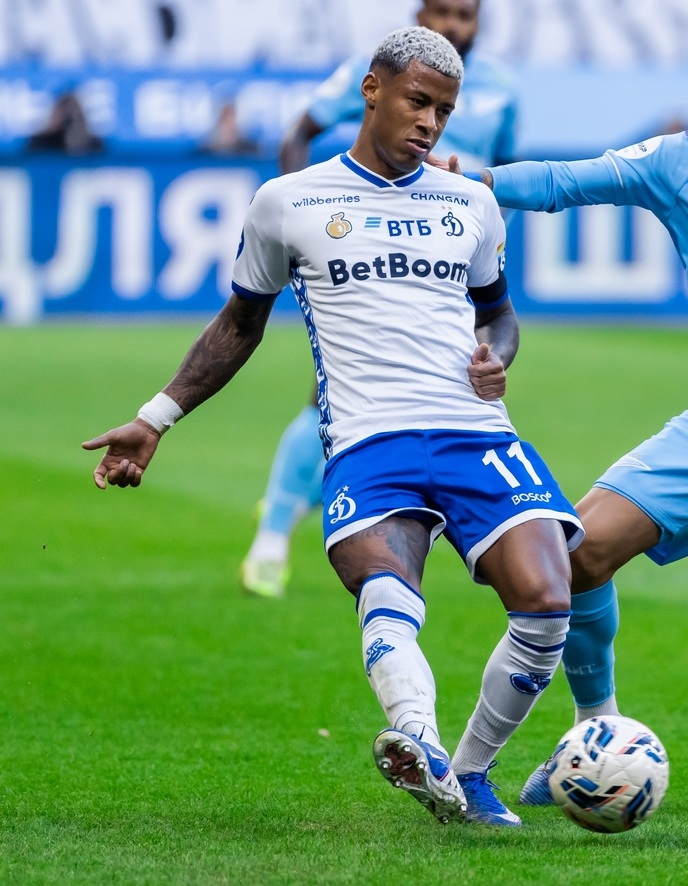
- Arthur Gomes with Dynamo Moscow in 2026

Personal information
- Full name: Arthur Gomes Lourenço
- Date of birth: 3 July 1998 (age 28)
- Place of birth: Uberlândia, Brazil
- Height: 1.74 m (5 ft 9 in)
- Position: Winger

Team information
- Current team: Dynamo Moscow
- Number: 11

Youth career
- 2004–2008: Poliesportivo
- 2008–2009: Uberlândia
- 2009–2011: São Paulo
- 2012–2016: Santos

Senior career*
Years	Team	Apps	(Gls)
2016–2021	Santos	84	(10)
2019	→ Chapecoense (loan)	30	(4)
2021	→ Atlético Goianiense (loan)	21	(4)
2021–2022	Estoril	32	(3)
2022–2023	Sporting	24	(1)
2023–2024	Cruzeiro	53	(7)
2024–	Dynamo Moscow	42	(8)

International career
2015	Brazil U17	5	(1)
- * Club domestic league appearances and goals as of 7 November 2026

Arthur Gomes Lourenço (born 3 July 1998), known as Arthur Gomes (Brazilian Portuguese: [aʁˈtuʁ ˈɡomis]) or simply Arthur, is a Brazilian footballer who plays as a winger for Russian Premier League club Dynamo Moscow.

== Club career ==
=== Santos ===
Arthur Gomes was born in Uberlândia, Minas Gerais, and joined Santos' youth setup in November 2012, after representing São Paulo, Uberlândia and Poliesportivo. In January 2015, he signed a two-year professional deal with the former.

In September 2016, after Gabriel's departure to Internazionale, Arthur Gomes was called up to train with the main squad by manager Dorival Júnior. He was first included in a matchday squad on 19 October, for a Copa do Brasil match against Internacional, but remained an unused substitute in the 0–2 away loss and subsequent elimination.

On 6 November 2016 Arthur Gomes made his first team – and Série A – debut, coming on as a late substitute for Jean Mota in a 2–1 away win against Ponte Preta. The following 4 January, after featuring in one further match with the main squad, he renewed his contract until December 2021.

Arthur Gomes scored his first professional goal on 3 February 2017, netting his team's fourth in a 6–2 Campeonato Paulista home routing of Linense. After only appearing rarely with Dorival and Levir Culpi, he was made a starter by interim manager Elano, and scored his first goal in the top tier on 4 November by netting the first in a 3–1 home win against Atlético Mineiro.

Arthur Gomes made his Copa Libertadores debut on 1 March 2018, replacing Jean Mota in a 2–0 away loss against Real Garcilaso.

==== Chapecoense (loan) ====
On 1 May 2019, Arthur Gomes was loaned to fellow top tier club Chapecoense until the end of the season.

==== Atlético Goianiense (loan) ====
On 23 March 2021, Arthur Gomes was loaned to Atlético Goianiense also in the first division, until the end of the year. After featuring regularly, he left the club on 7 August after accepting an offer from a club from abroad.

=== Estoril ===
On 9 August 2021, Arthur Gomes moved abroad after agreeing to a three-year contract with Portuguese Primeira Liga side Estoril; Santos retained 50% of the player's economic rights.

=== Sporting ===
On 1 September 2022, Gomes signed a five-year contract with Sporting CP of the same league, for a fee of €2.5 million for half of his economic rights, plus €1.5 million in add-ons. On September 13, he scored his first UEFA Champions League goal, sealing Sporting's 2–0 victory against Tottenham Hotspur after replacing Marcus Edwards in 90th minute.

=== Cruzeiro ===
On 15 July 2023, Gomes returned to Brazil, signing a three-year contract with Série A club Cruzeiro, for a fee of €3 million.

=== Dynamo Moscow ===
On 7 September 2024, Gomes signed a five-season contract with Dynamo Moscow in Russia. He scored his first Dynamo goal on 18 September 2024 in a Russian Cup game against Dynamo Makhachkala. On 12 April 2025, Gomes suffered an Achilles tendon rupture in a game against Pari Nizhny Novgorod. He returned to play in March 2026.

== Career statistics ==
As of match played 7 November 2026

Club	Season	League			State league (Note: Includes Campeonato Paulista, Campeonato Goiano, Campeonato Mineiro)		National cup (Note: Includes Copa do Brasil)		League cup (Note: Includes Taça da Liga)		Continental		Total	
Club	Season	Division	Apps	Goals	Apps	Goals	Apps	Goals	Apps	Goals	Apps	Goals	Apps	Goals
Santos	2016	Série A	2	0	—		0	0	—		—		2	0
Santos	2017	Série A	11	2	5	1	1	0	—		0	0	17	3
Santos	2018	Série A	13	0	16	3	3	0	—		5 (Note: Appearances in Copa Libertadores)	1	37	4
Santos	2019	Série A	0	0	3	0	0	0	—		0	0	3	0
Santos	2020	Série A	22	2	10	2	1	0	—		3	0	36	4
Santos	2021	Série A	0	0	2	0	0	0	—		0	0	2	0
Santos	Total		48	4	36	6	5	0	—		8	1	97	11
Chapecoense (loan)	2019	Série A	30	4	—		—		—		—		30	4
Atlético Goianiense (loan)	2021	Série A	12	1	9	3	4	0	—		3 (Note: Appearances in Copa Sudamericana)	0	28	4
Estoril	2021–22	Primeira Liga	28	2	—		0	0	—		—		28	2
Estoril	2022–23	Primeira Liga	4	1	—		0	0	0	0	—		4	1
Estoril	Total		32	3	—		0	0	0	0	—		32	3
Sporting CP	2022–23	Primeira Liga	24	1	—		0	0	6	1	8 (Note: Three appearances and two goals in UEFA Champions League, five appearances in UEFA Europa League)	2	38	4
Cruzeiro	2023	Série A	20	3	—		—		—		—		20	3
Cruzeiro	2024	Série A	21	2	12	2	1	0	—		5	1	39	5
Cruzeiro	Total		41	5	12	2	1	0	—		5	1	59	8
Dynamo Moscow	2024–25	Russian Premier League	16	3	—		5	1	—		—		21	4
Dynamo Moscow	2025–26	Russian Premier League	12	3	—		3	0	—		—		15	3
Dynamo Moscow	2026–27	Russian Premier League	14	2	—		2	0	—		—		16	2
Dynamo Moscow	Total		42	8	0	0	6	0	0	0	0	0	52	9
Career total			229	26	57	11	20	1	6	1	24	4	336	43
