= Diego Morales (footballer, born 1983) =

Argentine footballer

Personal information
- Full name: Diego Hernán Morales
- Date of birth: 16 April 1983 (age 43)
- Place of birth: Buenos Aires, Argentina
- Height: 1.84 m (6 ft 0 in)
- Position: Goalkeeper

Team information
- Current team: Alianza Universidad
- Number: 23

Senior career*
Years	Team	Apps	(Gls)
2002–2010	Argentinos Juniors	1	(0)
2005–2006	→ Estudiantes BA (loan)	34	(0)
2006–2007	→ All Boys (loan)	21	(0)
2010	→ Juan Aurich (loan)	27	(0)
2010–2012	Quilmes	1	(0)
2012	Sport Boys	15	(0)
2012–2013	UCV	6	(0)
2013–2014	Sport Boys	22	(0)
2014–2017	Cienciano	116	(0)
2018	Real Garcilaso	17	(0)
2019–	Alianza Universidad	72	(0)
- * Club domestic league appearances and goals as of 1 August 2021

Diego Hernán Morales (born 16 April 1983) is an Argentine footballer who plays as a goalkeeper for Alianza Universidad in the Peruvian Primera División.

Having been part of the Argentinos Juniors squad since 2004 as a reserve goalkeeper, Morales made his league debut in a 1–1 draw against Godoy Cruz on 8 November 2008, as the team's first choice goalkeeper Sebastián Torrico was unavailable.
