= Luan Kejun =

Chinese politician (born 1960)

- 栾克军

Mayor of Lanzhou
- In office December 2016 – November 2017
- Preceded by: Yuan Zhanting
- Succeeded by: Zhang Weiwen

Communist Party Secretary of Qingyang
- In office October 2014 – September 2016
- Preceded by: Xia Hongmin
- Succeeded by: Yun Jianmin

Mayor of Qingyang
- In office November 2012 – October 2014
- Preceded by: Zhou Qiang
- Succeeded by: Yun Jianmin

Mayor of Zhangye
- In office May 2008 – August 2012
- Preceded by: He Zhenzhong
- Succeeded by: Huang Zeyuan

Personal details
- Born: June 1960 (age 66) Pingliang, Gansu, China
- Party: Chinese Communist Party
- Education: Central Party School of the Chinese Communist Party; Lanzhou University

Luan Kejun (simplified Chinese: 栾克军; traditional Chinese: 欒克軍; pinyin: Luán Kèjūn; born June 1960) is a former Chinese politician who spent his career in his home province Gansu in northwest China. He entered the workforce in December 1978, and joined the Chinese Communist Party in June 1986. He was investigated by the Chinese Communist Party's anti-graft agency in November 2017. At the height of his career, he served as deputy party chief and mayor of Lanzhou, capital of Gansu province.

== Career ==
Luan Kejun was born in June 1960. After the Cultural Revolution, he worked in Huating Mining District. Five months later, he was transferred to the Fourth Engineering Department of Gansu Government. Beginning in 1980, he served in several posts in Huating Mining Bureau and Huating Mining Association, including deputy director, deputy manager, manager, and secretary of party general branch. He was educated in the Central Party School of the Chinese Communist Party from August 1997 to December 1999 as a part-time student. In June 2002 he was transferred to Zhangye, where he served as vice mayor from November 2002 to December 2004. He entered Lanzhou University in September 2001, majoring in regional economies, where he graduated in June 2004. He was executive vice mayor in December 2004, and held that office until March 2008, when he was appointed deputy party chief and acting mayor. In May 2008, he was elevated to mayor. He also served as president of Zhangye Municipal School of Administration between December 2004 to August 2012. In August 2012 he was transferred to Qingyang, he served as deputy party chief and acting mayor from 2012 to 2014, and party chief, the top political position in the city, from 2014 to 2016. Then he was transferred to Lanzhou and appointed deputy party chief and acting mayor. In December 2016, he concurrently served as deputy party chief, mayor and party branch secretary.

Before Kejun Luan was transferred to Lanzhou, the Central Commission for Discipline Inspection (CCDI) was handling the issue of official corruption in Qingyang. Since then, former deputy secretary of Qingyang Municipal Committee Dai Binglong (Chinese: 戴炳隆) and Huachi County Party Secretary Zhang Wanfu (Chinese: 张万福) were sacked for graft.

== Downfall ==
On November 29, 2017, the Central Commission for Discipline Inspection said in a statement on its website that Luan Kejun has come under investigation for "serious legal violations".

On April 12, 2018, he was indicted on suspicion of accepting bribes. On July 19, he stood trial at the Baiyin Intermediate People's Court on charges of taking bribes. He was accused of abusing his powers in former positions he held between 2002 and 2017 in Zhangye and Qingyang to seek benefits for individuals in project construction and project contracting. In return, he accepted money and valuables such as real estate and vehicles. On December 27, Luan was sentenced to 11 years in prison and fined 1 million yuan (145,660 U.S. dollars) by the Intermediate People's Court in Baiyin for accepting cash, housing, and cars with the total value exceeding 10 million yuan (about 1.45 million U.S. dollars), as well as 110,000 dollars and 22,000 euros between 2002 and 2017.

Government offices
Preceded by He Zhenzhong (何振中)	Mayor of Zhangye; 2008–2012	Succeeded by Huang Zeyuan (黄泽元)
Preceded by Zhou Qiang (周强)	Mayor of Qingyang; 2012–2014	Succeeded by Yun Jianmin (贠建民)
Preceded by Yuan Zhanting (袁占亭)	Mayor of Lanzhou; 2016–2017	Succeeded by Zhang Weiwen
Party political offices
Preceded by Xia Hongmin (夏红民)	Communist Party Secretary of Qingyang; 2014–2016	Succeeded by Yun Jianmin (贠建民)
