= Léo Cittadini =

Brazilian footballer

- Léo Cittadini in 2018

Personal information
- Full name: Leonardo Cittadini
- Date of birth: 27 February 1994 (age 32)
- Place of birth: Rio Claro, Brazil
- Height: 1.78 m (5 ft 10 in)
- Position: Midfielder

Team information
- Current team: Ningbo FC

Youth career
- 2011–2012: Guarani
- 2012–2013: Santos

Senior career*
Years	Team	Apps	(Gls)
2011–2012	Guarani	4	(0)
2013–2018	Santos	62	(1)
2014	→ Ponte Preta (loan)	11	(0)
2019–2023	Athletico Paranaense	122	(15)
2023–2025	Bahia	7	(0)
2024	→ Shanghai Port (loan)	28	(4)
2025	Operário Ferroviário	1	(0)
2026–	Ningbo FC	0	(0)
- * Club domestic league appearances and goals as of 16:07, 17 December 2025 (UTC)

Leonardo "Léo" Cittadini (born 27 February 1994) is a Brazilian footballer who plays for China League One club Ningbo FC.

== Club career ==
=== Guarani ===
Born in Rio Claro, São Paulo, Cittadini started his career at Guarani, and was promoted to first team in 2010, under the management of Vágner Mancini. He made his first team debut on 30 March 2011, against Horizonte, in that season's Copa do Brasil. He was handed a starting spot on 1 May, against São José, providing an assist for Léo Paraíba's goal.

However, in December, Cittadini had altercations with his club, claiming late payment of wages. In March 2012, half of the player's rights was sold to an agent, due to problems in the negotiation of a contract renewal.

=== Santos ===
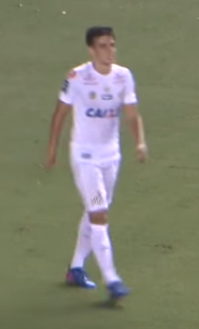
Léo Cittadini with Santos in 2017

On 7 July 2012, he signed a two-year contract with Santos, being assigned to youth team. There, he won the 2012 Campeonato Paulista U-20, beating São Paulo in the finals, and also won the 2013 Copa São Paulo de Futebol Júnior.

On 3 June 2013, he was promoted to Santos' first team alongside Walace. He made his debut on the 12th, replacing Pedro Castro in the 70th minute of a 1-0 home win against Atlético Mineiro.

On 24 July 2013, Cittadini scored his first professional goal, the last of a 2–0 away win against CRAC in the 2013 Copa do Brasil.

==== Ponte Preta (loan) ====
In April 2014 Cittadini joined Guarani's fierce rivals Ponte Preta on loan until the end of the season. He made his debut for the club on the 19th, playing the entire second half in a 1–1 home draw against Icasa.

On 7 October Cittadini's loan was cancelled, and he subsequently returned to Santos.

==== Return from loan ====
After his return from loan, Cittadini was not utilized by managers Enderson Moreira and Marcelo Fernandes. After the arrival of Dorival Júnior he returned to action, being converted to a defensive midfielder in the 2016 season; he also rejected a loan move to Chievo in the process.

On 10 April 2016 Cittadini scored his first goal after his return, netting his team's first in a 2–1 Campeonato Paulista home win against Audax. He was mainly used as a replacement to Lucas Lima afterwards, becoming a starter during the latter's participation in Copa América Centenario. On 6 November, after nearly two months without playing a single minute, he came off the bench to provide two assists in Santos' 2–1 away win against former club Ponte Preta; he ended up crying after the match was over.

Cittadini made his Copa Libertadores debut on 18 May 2017, coming on as a late substitute for Vitor Bueno in a 1–1 away draw against The Strongest. During the 2018 campaign, under new manager Jair Ventura, he overtook veterans Emiliano Vecchio and Renato and became a regular starter for the side. Despite Vecchio left the club, he lost the starting spot to Diego Pituca and new signing Carlos Sánchez, being completely ostracized by new manager Cuca after refusing a contract renewal.

=== Athletico Paranaense ===
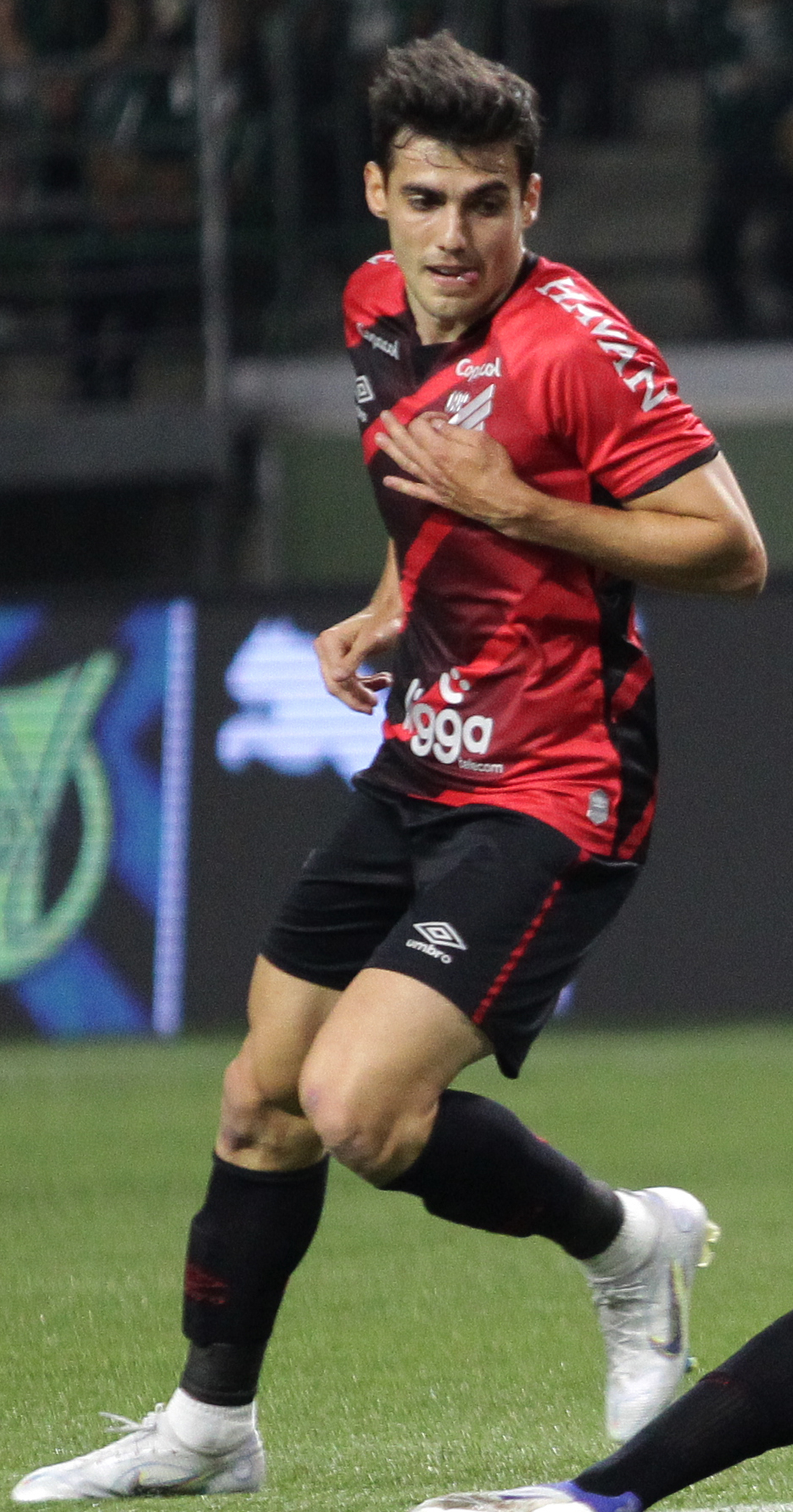
Cittadini playing for Athletico Paranaense in 2022

On 7 December 2018, Cittadini signed a three-year contract with Athletico Paranaense, effective as of the following 1 January. Under manager Tiago Nunes, he became an important unit in the club's midfield, scoring a career-best six goals in the season.

=== Bahia ===
On 28 July 2023, Cittadini signed for Bahia on a two-year contract with the option of a further year.

==== Shanghai Port (loan) ====
On 27 February 2024, Cittadini joined Chinese Super League club Shanghai Port on loan.

=== Ningbo FC ===
On 11 February 2026, Cittadini joined China League One club Ningbo FC.

== Career statistics ==
As of match played 2 November 2024

Appearances and goals by club, season and competition
Club	Season	League			State League		Cup		Continental		Other		Total	
Club	Season	Division	Apps	Goals	Apps	Goals	Apps	Goals	Apps	Goals	Apps	Goals	Apps	Goals
Guarani	2011	Série B	0	0	4	0	1	0	—		—		5	0
Santos	2013	Série A	3	0	—		2	1	—		—		5	1
Santos	2014	Série A	0	0	2	0	—		—		—		2	0
Santos	2015	Série A	6	0	0	0	0	0	—		—		6	0
Santos	2016	Série A	16	0	4	1	4	0	—		—		24	1
Santos	2017	Série A	7	0	5	0	1	0	2 (Note: Appearance(s) in Copa Libertadores)	0	—		15	0
Santos	2018	Série A	12	0	7	0	0	0	4	0	—		23	0
Santos	Total		44	0	18	1	7	1	6	0	—		75	2
Ponte Preta (loan)	2014	Série B	11	0	—		3	0	—		—		14	0
Athletico Paranaense	2019	Série A	21	4	3	1	4	1	3	0	2 (Note: Appearance(s) in Recopa Sudamericana)	0	33	6
Athletico Paranaense	2020	Série A	31	5	7	2	1	0	6	0	1 (Note: Appearance(s) in Supercopa do Brasil)	0	46	7
Athletico Paranaense	2021	Série A	29	0	3	1	9	0	12 (Note: Appearance(s) in Copa Sudamericana)	0	—		53	1
Athletico Paranaense	2022	Série A	20	1	2	1	3	0	2	0	2	0	29	2
Athletico Paranaense	2023	Série A	5	0	8	0	1	0	0	0	—		14	0
Athletico Paranaense	Total		106	10	23	5	18	1	23	0	5	0	175	16
Bahia	2023	Série A	7	0	—		—		—		—		7	0
Shanghai Port (loan)	2024	Chinese Super League	28	4	—		4	3	3	0	—		35	7
Career total			196	14	45	6	33	5	32	0	5	0	311	25

== Honours ==
Santos

- Campeonato Paulista: 2015, 2016

Athletico Paranaense

- Campeonato Paranaense: 2019, 2020, 2023
- J.League Cup / Copa Sudamericana Championship: 2019
- Copa do Brasil: 2019
- Copa Sudamericana: 2021

Shanghai Port

- Chinese Super League: 2024
- Chinese FA Cup: 2024
