= Luana de Noailles =

Brazilian model (born 1949)

Luana de Noailles (born November 23, 1949) is a French-Brazilian former model and dancer, active in the 1960s and 1970s. She was the first Brazilian Black female model to gain international recognition, particularly in Europe.

== Biography ==
Born in Salvador as Raimunda Nonata do Sacramento into a modest family, she was raised in the Liberdade neighbourhood, known as a center of Afro-Brazilian culture, and attended a Catholic school. She began her modelling career walking in Salvador fashion events and was later recruited at the age of sixteen by scouts who were looking for a model who was ''black like Pelé''. She was hired by the Brazilian subsidiary of Rhône-Poulenc, which at the time sponsored fashion events, such as the annual FENIT, and adopted the artistic name Luana. She then traveled through England and moved to São Paulo.

She drew the attention of Paco Rabanne, who invited her to model. She established herself in Italy before moving to Paris, where she built her career working for the fashion houses Dior, Rabanne, Chanel, and Yves Saint Laurent.

She married Gilles de Noailles. Her wedding dress, designed by André Courrèges, is part of the collection of the Museu Afro Brasil.
