= Jesús Arismendi =

Peruvian footballer (born 1987)

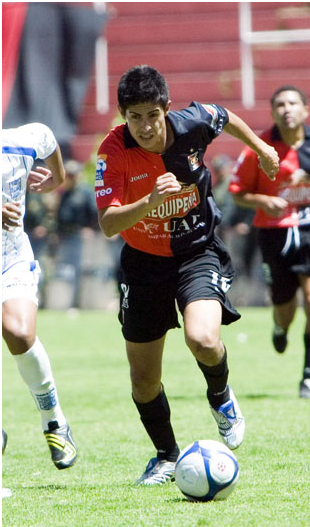
- Arismendi in 2011

Personal information
- Full name: Wadid Jesús Arismendi Lazo
- Date of birth: 25 March 1987 (age 39)
- Place of birth: Arequipa, Peru
- Height: 1.80 m (5 ft 11 in)
- Position: Right-back

Team information
- Current team: Carlos A. Mannucci
- Number: 2

Senior career*
| Years | Team | Apps | (Gls) |
| 2005–2009 | Melgar | | |
| 2010 | César Vallejo | 15 | (0) |
| 2011 | Melgar | 25 | (0) |
| 2012 | Sport Boys | 27 | (1) |
| 2013 | UTC | 33 | (0) |
| 2014–2015 | Ayacucho | 39 | (8) |
| 2016 | Melgar | 24 | (1) |
| 2017 | Ayacucho | 36 | (6) |
| 2018–2019 | Real Garcilaso | 58 | (5) |
| 2020– | Carlos A. Mannucci | 0 | (0) |
- * Club domestic league appearances and goals as of 20:22, 23 April 2020 (UTC)

Wadid Jesús Arismendi (born 25 March 1987) is a Peruvian footballer who plays as a right-back for Carlos A. Mannucci.

== Career statistics ==
As of 29 May 2018

Appearances and goals by club, season and competition
| Club | Season | League | | | Cup | | Continental | | Other | | Total | |
| Club | Season | Division | Apps | Goals | Apps | Goals | Apps | Goals | Apps | Goals | Apps | Goals |
|---|---|---|---|---|---|---|---|---|---|---|---|---|
| Melgar | 2009 | Torneo Descentralizado | 36 | 2 | — | | — | | — | | 36 | 2 |
| César Vallejo | 2010 | Torneo Descentralizado | 15 | 0 | — | | 2 (Note: Appearance(s) in Copa Sudamericana) | 0 | — | | 17 | 0 |
| Melgar | 2011 | Torneo Descentralizado | 25 | 0 | — | | — | | — | | 25 | 0 |
| Sport Boys | 2012 | Torneo Descentralizado | 27 | 1 | — | | — | | — | | 27 | 1 |
| UTC | 2013 | Torneo Descentralizado | 33 | 0 | — | | — | | — | | 33 | 0 |
| Ayacucho | 2014 | Torneo Descentralizado | 21 | 5 | 1 | 0 | 2 | 0 | — | | 24 | 5 |
| Ayacucho | 2015 | Torneo Descentralizado | 18 | 3 | 8 | 0 | — | | — | | 26 | 3 |
| Ayacucho | Total | | 39 | 8 | 9 | 0 | 2 | 0 | — | | 50 | 8 |
| Melgar | 2016 | Torneo Descentralizado | 24 | 1 | — | | 3 (Note: Appearance(s) in Copa Libertadores) | 0 | — | | 27 | 1 |
| Ayacucho | 2017 | Torneo Descentralizado | 36 | 6 | — | | — | | — | | 36 | 6 |
| Real Garcilaso | 2018 | Torneo Descentralizado | 10 | 1 | — | | 5 | 0 | — | | 15 | 1 |
| Career total | | | 245 | 19 | 9 | 0 | 12 | 0 | 0 | 0 | 266 | 19 |
