= Lauan =

Lauan may refer to:

- Lauan (tree), several varieties of tree known as Philippine mahogany in the genus Shorea
- Lauan ground skink, a species of lizard found on the Lau Islands of Fiji
- Lauan language, a language spoken in East Fiji
- Lauan plywood, decorative plywood made with Philippine mahogany

== See also ==
- Luan (disambiguation)
