= Luan Santos =

Luan Santos may refer to:

- Luan Santos (footballer, born 1991) (born 1991), Brazilian footballer playing for C.F. União
- Luan Santos (footballer, born 1999), Brazilian footballer playing for São Paulo FC
