= Luan (footballer, born 1987) =

Brazilian footballer

Personal information
- Full name: Luan Bueno Ferreira de Brito
- Date of birth: 26 June 1987 (age 39)
- Place of birth: Brasília, Brazil
- Height: 1.86 m (6 ft 1 in)
- Position: Centre back

Team information
- Current team: Santa Cruz (on loan from XV de Piracicaba

Senior career*
Years	Team	Apps	(Gls)
2007–2009	Legião		
2008	→ CFZ (loan)		
2008	→ Brasília (loan)		
2009	→ Holanda–AM (loan)		
2009–2010	Botafogo–DF		
2010	Anápolis		
2010	CFZ		
2011	Formosa		
2011	Iporá		
2011	Capital		
2012–2013	Brasiliense	27	(2)
2014	Ponte Preta	5	(0)
2015–2018	Ferroviária	51	(2)
2015	→ Bragantino (loan)	19	(0)
2018	→ Boa Esporte (loan)	16	(0)
2019	Joinville	24	(1)
2019–2022	Confiança	48	(2)
2022-	XV de Piracicaba	14	(1)
2022-	→ Santa Cruz (loan)	0	(0)
- * Club domestic league appearances and goals as of 18:25, 14 April 2022 (UTC)

Luan Bueno Ferreira de Brito (born 26 June 1987), simply known as Luan, is a Brazilian footballer who plays for Santa Cruz, on loan from XV de Piracicaba as a defender.

== Career statistics ==
As of 19 February 2018

Club	Season	League			State League		Cup		Continental		Other		Total	
Club	Season	Division	Apps	Goals	Apps	Goals	Apps	Goals	Apps	Goals	Apps	Goals	Apps	Goals
Brasiliense	2012	Série C	9	0	—		2	1	—		—		11	1
Brasiliense	2013	Série C	18	2	—		—		—		—		18	2
Brasiliense	Subtotal		27	2	—		2	1	—		—		29	3
Ponte Preta	2014	Série B	5	0	0	0	2	0	—		—		7	0
Bragantino	2015	Série B	19	0	—		—		—		—		19	0
Ferroviária	2015	Paulista	—		18	1	—		—		—		18	1
Ferroviária	2016	Paulista	—		3	0	3	1	—		22 (Note: All appearance(s) in Copa Paulista)	3	28	4
Ferroviária	2017	Paulista	—		10	0	—		—		20	0	30	0
Ferroviária	2018	Série D	—		8	1	—		—		—		8	1
Ferroviária	Subtotal		—		39	2	3	1	—		42	3	84	6
Career total			51	2	39	2	7	2	0	0	42	3	139	9
