= Coqueiral =

Municipality in Minas Gerais, Brazil

Coordinates: 21°11′10″S 45°26′38″W

- Municipality
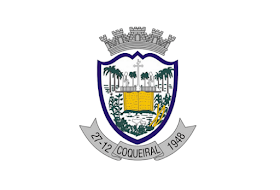
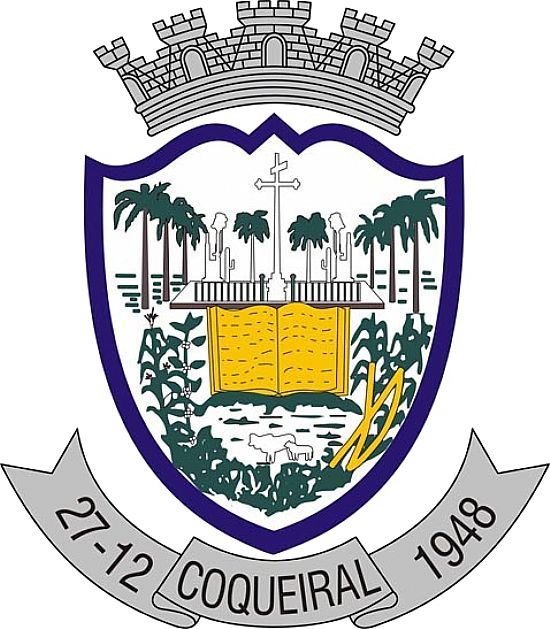
- Flag Coat of arms
- Interactive map of Coqueiral
- Country: Brazil
- State: Minas Gerais
- Region: Southeast
- Time zone: UTC−3 (BRT)

Location of Coqueiral in the state of Minas Gerais

Coqueiral is a municipality in the south of the Brazilian Brazilian state of Minas Gerais. In 2010 the population was 9,289 in a total area of 297 km^{2} (115 sq mi). The municipal seat lies at an elevation of 844 meters. It became a municipality in 1948.

== Geography ==
Coqueiral belongs to the IBGE statistical microregion of Varginha. It is located north of Varginha and Três Pontas, west of Lavras, and northeast of Alfenas. The regional center of Varginha is 57 km. away.

== Economy ==
The main economic activities are milk production, coffee growing (7,200 hectares in 2006), and the cultivation of beans, corn, and sugarcane. In 2006 there were 808 rural producers with total agricultural area of 22,649 hectares. More than 2,000 persons worked in agriculture. In the town itself there was one financial institution.

In the health sector there were 6 public clinics and 1 private clinic. There were no hospitals, the closest hospital being in Três Pontas, 31 km. away. In the educational sector there were 13 primary schools and 1 middle school.

== Municipal Human Development Index ==
- MHDI: .751
- State ranking: 272 out of 853 municipalities
- National ranking: 1,842 out of 5,138 municipalities
- Life expectancy: 72 years at birth
- Literacy rate: 87% (See Frigoletto for the complete list)

== See also ==
- List of municipalities in Minas Gerais
