= 2015 Santa Cruz Futebol Clube season =

Santa Cruz
2015 season
- Chairman: Alírio Moraes
- Manager: Ricardinho; Marcelo Martelotte
- Stadium: Estádio do Arruda
- Série B: Runners-up
- Pernambucano: Champions (28th title)
- Top goalscorer: League: Anderson Aquino (10); All: Anderson Aquino (13)
Home colours	Away colours

The 2015 season was Santa Cruz's 102nd season in the club's history. Santa Cruz competed in the Campeonato Pernambucano and Série B.

== Squad ==
Note: Flags indicate national team as defined under FIFA eligibility rules; some limited exceptions apply. Players may hold more than one non-FIFA nationality.

No.	Pos.	Nation	Player
1	GK	BRA	Tiago Cardoso
2	DF	BRA	Nininho
3	DF	BRA	Danny Morais
4	DF	BRA	Rafael Alemão
5	MF	BRA	Wellington Cézar
6	DF	BRA	Lúcio
7	MF	BRA	Nathan
8	MF	BRA	Bruninho
9	FW	BRA	Anderson Aquino
10	MF	BRA	João Paulo
11	FW	BRA	Raniel
12	GK	BRA	Fred
13	DF	BRA	Diego Sacoman
14	DF	BRA	João Carlos
15	MF	BRA	Renatinho
16	MF	BRA	Moradei
17	MF	BRA	Guilherme Biteco

No.	Pos.	Nation	Player
18	MF	BRA	Daniel Costa
19	FW	BRA	Waldison
20	FW	BRA	Luisinho
21	DF	BRA	Marlon
22	MF	BRA	Lelê
23	FW	BRA	Grafite
24	GK	BRA	Bruno
25	DF	BRA	Neris
26	DF	BRA	Walter Marques
27	MF	BRA	Emerson Santos
28	MF	BRA	Bileu
30	MF	BRA	William da Luz
31	MF	BRA	Pedro Castro
35	MF	BRA	Edson Sitta
36	FW	BRA	Bruno Mineiro
40	GK	BRA	Wadson
99	FW	BRA	Bruno Moraes

== Statistics ==
=== Overall ===
Games played	52 (14 Pernambucano, 38 Série B)
Games won	27 (7 Pernambucano, 20 Série B)
Games drawn	10 (3 Pernambucano, 7 Série B)
Games lost	15 (4 Pernambucano, 11 Série B)
Goals scored	79
Goals conceded	54
Goal difference	+25
Best results (goal difference)	4–0 (H) v Central – Pernambucano – 2015.04.18
Worst result (goal difference)	1–4 (A) v América–MG – Série B – 2015.05.23
Top scorer	Grafite (24)

Source: Santa Cruz official website

=== Goalscorers ===
Place	Position	Nationality	Number	Name	Campeonato Pernambucano	Série B	Total
1	FW	(Brazil)	9	Anderson Aquino	3	10	13
2	FW	(Brazil)	20	Bruno Moraes	0	9	9
3	MF	(Brazil)	10	Daniel Costa	0	7	7
3	FW	(Brazil)	23	Grafite	0	7	7
3	MF	(Brazil)	19	Luisinho	0	7	7
4	FW	(Brazil)	9	Betinho	5	0	5
4	FW	(Brazil)	11	Lelê	0	5	5
5	DF	(Brazil)	3	Rafael Alemão	3	1	4
6	MF	(Brazil)	10	João Paulo	2	1	3
7	DF	(Brazil)	4	Danny Morais	0	2	2
7	MF	(Brazil)	17	Nathan	0	2	2
7	FW	(Brazil)	21	Raniel	1	1	2
7	DF	(Brazil)	8	Renatinho	0	2	2
8	DF	(Brazil)	6	Allan Vieira	0	1	1
8	MF	(Brazil)	7	Bileu	0	1	1
8	MF	(Brazil)	13	Bruninho	0	1	1
8	MF	(Brazil)	18	Emerson Santos	1	0	1
8	MF	(Brazil)	17	Guilherme Biteco	1	0	1
8	MF	(Brazil)	20	Marcílio	0	1	1
8	MF	(Brazil)	5	Moradei	0	1	1
8	MF	(Brazil)	17	Pedro Castro	0	1	1
8	DF	(Brazil)	2	Vítor	0	1	1
8	FW	(Brazil)	21	Waldison	0	1	1
				Own goals	0	1	1
				Total	16	63	79

=== Managers performance ===
Name	Nationality	From	To	P	W	D	L	GF	GA	Avg%	Ref
Ricardinho	Brazil	31 January 2015	12 June 2015	21	8	5	8	24	23	46%	
Marcelo Martelotte	Brazil	20 June 2015	28 November 2015	31	19	5	7	55	31	66%	

== Friendlies ==
=== Taça Chico Science ===
22 January 2015	Santa Cruz (Brazil)	1–1 (10–11 p)	(Lithuania) Žalgiris	Recife
(UTC-3)	Waldison 44'	Report	Adi Rocha 11' (pen.)	Stadium: Estádio José do Rego Maciel (Arruda); Attendance: 5,011; Referee: Anderson Freitas

=== National ===
25 January 2015	Santa Cruz	3–0	Campinense	Recife
(UTC-3)	Edson Sitta 32'; Anderson Aquino 47'; Williams Luz 63'	Report		Stadium: Estádio José do Rego Maciel (Arruda); Attendance: 2,572; Referee: Cláudio Mercante

== Official Competitions ==
=== Campeonato Pernambucano ===
==== First stage ====
31 January 2015 1	Santa Cruz	0–3	Sport	Recife
18:30 (UTC-3)		Report	Danilo Barcelos 62' (pen.); Élber 70', 88'	Stadium: Estádio José do Rego Maciel (Arruda); Attendance: 24,143; Referee: Marcelo de Lima Henrique

8 February 2015 2	Serra Talhada	3–0	Santa Cruz	Serra Talhada
16:00 (UTC-3)	Júnior Juazeiro 22', 37'; Kleitinho 80'	Report		Stadium: Estádio Nildo Pereira de Menezes; Attendance: 4,988; Referee: Niélson Nogueira Dias

18 February 2015 3	Central	1–2	Santa Cruz	Caruaru
21:20 (UTC-3)	Candinho 20'	Report	Guilherme Biteco 17'; João Paulo 61'	Stadium: Estádio Luiz José de Lacerda (Lacerdão); Attendance: 5,039

21 February 2015 4	Santa Cruz	0–1	Salgueiro	Recife
18:30 (UTC-3)		Report	Jefersom Berger 55'	Stadium: Estádio José do Rego Maciel (Arruda); Attendance: 9,992

25 February 2015 5	Náutico	1–2	Santa Cruz	São Lourenço da Mata
22:00 (UTC-3)	Renato Henrique 34'	Report	Rafael Alemão 43'; Betinho 86'	Stadium: Estádio Governador Carlos Wilson Campos (Arena Pernambuco); Attendance: 4,626

1 March 2015 6	Santa Cruz	0–0	Náutico	São Lourenço da Mata
16:00 (UTC-3)		Report		Stadium: Estádio Governador Carlos Wilson Campos (Arena Pernambuco); Attendance: 14,714; Referee: Nielson Nogueira Dias

8 March 2015 7	Salgueiro	1–0	Santa Cruz	Salgueiro
16:00 (UTC-3)	Anderson Lessa 75'	Report		Stadium: Estádio Cornélio de Barros; Attendance: 6,272

15 March 2015 8	Santa Cruz	1–0	Central	Recife
16:00 (UTC-3)	Anderson Aquino 60'	Report		Stadium: Estádio José do Rego Maciel (Arruda); Attendance: 8,540; Referee: Marcelo de Lima Henrique

21 March 2015 9	Santa Cruz	3–0	Serra Talhada	Recife
19:30 (UTC-3)	Raniel 56'; Betinho 63', 90+1'	Report		Stadium: Estádio José do Rego Maciel (Arruda); Attendance: 14,301; Referee: Luiz Sobral

5 April 2015 10	Sport	1–1	Santa Cruz	Recife
16:00 (UTC-3)	Samuel 47' (pen.)	Report	João Paulo 90+2'	Stadium: Estádio Adelmar da Costa Carvalho (Ilha do Retiro); Referee: Luiz Cláudio Sobral

==== Semi-finals ====
18 April 2015	Santa Cruz	4–0	Central	Recife
18:30 (UTC-3)	Betinho 45+2', 90+3'; Rafael Alemão 81', 89'	Report		Stadium: Estádio José do Rego Maciel (Arruda); Referee: Sebastião Rufino Filho

26 April 2015	Central	0–2	Santa Cruz	Caruaru
16:00 (UTC-3)		Report	Emerson Santos 6'; Anderson Aquino 90'	Stadium: Estádio Luiz José de Lacerda (Lacerdão); Attendance: 6,061; Referee: Niélson Nogueira Dias

==== Finals ====
29 April 2015	Salgueiro	0–0	Santa Cruz	Salgueiro
22:00 (UTC-3)		Report		Stadium: Estádio Cornélio de Barros; Referee: Marcelo de Lima Henrique

3 May 2015	Santa Cruz	1–0	Salgueiro	Recife
16:00 (UTC-3)	Anderson Aquino 69'	Report		Stadium: Estádio José do Rego Maciel (Arruda); Attendance: 46,370; Referee: Emerson Sobral

==== Record ====
Final Position	Points	Matches	Wins	Draws	Losses	Goals For	Goals Away	Avg%
1st	24	14	7	3	4	16	11	57%

=== Série B ===
9 May 2015 1	Macaé	2–0	Santa Cruz	Macaé
16:30 (UTC-3)	Fernando 35'; Juninho Valoura 90+3'	Report		Stadium: Estádio Cláudio Moacyr de Azevedo (Moacyrzão); Attendance: 2,520; Referee: Aurélio Santana Martins

15 May 2015 2	Santa Cruz	4–1	Paraná	Recife
19:30 (UTC-3)	Rodrigo 6' (o.g.); Nathan 55'; Anderson Aquino 72', 82'	Report	Rodrigo 40'	Stadium: Estádio José do Rego Maciel (Arruda); Attendance: 8,172; Referee: Italo Medeiros de Azevedo

23 May 2015 3	América–MG	4–1	Santa Cruz	Belo Horizonte
16:30 (UTC-3)	Robertinho 1'; Mancini 9'; Diego Sacoman 15' (o.g.); Marcelo Toscano 43'	Report	Pedro Castro 45'	Stadium: Estádio Raimundo Sampaio (Independência); Attendance: 758; Referee: Rafael Traci

29 May 2015 4	Santa Cruz	0–1	ABC	Recife
19:30 (UTC-3)		Report	Kayke 27'	Stadium: Estádio José do Rego Maciel (Arruda); Attendance: 5,027; Referee: Luiz César de Oliveira Magalhães

2 June 2015 5	Paysandu	2–1	Santa Cruz	Belém
19:30 (UTC-3)	Thiago Martins 33'; Carlinhos 76'	Report	Anderson Aquino 45+1'	Stadium: Estádio Leônidas Sodré de Castro (Curuzu); Attendance: 9,165; Referee: Glauco Nunes Feitosa

6 June 2015 6	Luverdense	2–2	Santa Cruz	Lucas do Rio Verde
16:30 (UTC-3)	Diego Rosa 17'; Osman Júnior 28'	Report	Daniel Costa 3'; Nathan 78'	Stadium: Estádio Municipal Passo das Emas; Attendance: 543; Referee: Rodrigo D Alonso Ferreira

12 June 2015 7	Santa Cruz	0–0	Boa Esporte	Recife
21:50 (UTC-3)		Report		Stadium: Estádio José do Rego Maciel (Arruda); Attendance: 3,985; Referee: Rafael Martins Diniz

20 June 2015 8	Ceará	3–3	Santa Cruz	Fortaleza
16:30 (UTC-3)	Roger Gaúcho 30'; Marinho 75', 90+3'	Report	Anderson Aquino 25', 65'; Waldison 90'	Stadium: Estádio Governador Plácido Castelo (Castelão); Attendance: 6,934; Referee: Wasley do Couto Leão

27 June 2015 9	Santa Cruz	1–0	Sampaio Corrêa	Recife
16:30 (UTC-3)	Renatinho 64'	Report		Stadium: Estádio José do Rego Maciel (Arruda); Attendance: 8,227; Referee: Gleidson Santos Oliveira

4 July 2015 10	Bragantino	1–2	Santa Cruz	Bragança Paulista
16:30 (UTC-3)	Johnathan 90+5'	Report	Anderson Aquino 57'; Renatinho 81'	Stadium: Estádio Nabi Abi Chedid; Attendance: 830; Referee: Edivaldo Elias da Silva

7 July 2015 11	Santa Cruz	2–1	CRB	Recife
21:50 (UTC-3)	João Paulo 48'; Anderson Aquino 80'	Report	Zé Carlos 3'	Stadium: Estádio José do Rego Maciel (Arruda); Attendance: 9,708; Referee: Johnn Herbert Alves Bispo

11 July 2015 12	Náutico	2–1	Santa Cruz	São Lourenço da Mata
16:30 (UTC-3)	Guilherme Lucena 52'; Gil Mineiro 73'	Report	Anderson Aquino 58'	Stadium: Estádio Governador Carlos Wilson Campos (Arena Pernambuco); Attendance: 12,085; Referee: Sebastião Rufino Ribeiro Filho

18 July 2015 13	Santa Cruz	3–0	Atlético Goianiense	Recife
16:30 (UTC-3)	Lelê 14', 90+2'; Daniel Costa 63'	Report		Stadium: Estádio José do Rego Maciel (Arruda); Attendance: 10,220; Referee: Igor Junio Benevenuto

25 July 2015 14	Criciúma	0–0	Santa Cruz	Criciúma
16:30 (UTC-3)		Report		Stadium: Estádio Heriberto Hülse; Attendance: 4,321; Referee: Alinor Silva da Paixão

28 July 2015 15	Santa Cruz	3–1	Bahia	Recife
19:30 (UTC-3)	Anderson Aquino 37'; Luisinho 63', 90+3'	Report	Thales 39'	Stadium: Estádio José do Rego Maciel (Arruda); Attendance: 13,235; Referee: Rafael Traci

1 August 2015 16	Oeste	1–0	Santa Cruz	Osasco
16:30 (UTC-3)	Rafael Martins 81'	Report		Stadium: Estádio Prefeito José Liberatti; Attendance: 1,928; Referee: Jailson Macedo Freitas

8 August 2015 17	Santa Cruz	1–0	Botafogo	Recife
16:30 (UTC-3)	Grafite 50'	Report		Stadium: Estádio José do Rego Maciel (Arruda); Attendance: 44,872; Referee: Flávio Rodrigues Guerra

11 August 2015 18	Santa Cruz	2–1	Mogi Mirim	Recife
19:00 (UTC-3)	Grafite 20'; Anderson Aquino 31'	Report	Geovane 13'	Stadium: Estádio José do Rego Maciel (Arruda); Attendance: 13,660; Referee: Andrey da Silva e Silva

14 August 2015 19	Vitória	2–1	Santa Cruz	Salvador
19:00 (UTC-3)	Escudero 6'; Élton 8'	Report	Luisinho 55'	Stadium: Estádio Manoel Barradas (Barradão); Attendance: 15,203; Referee: Luis Teixeira Rocha

21 August 2015 20	Santa Cruz	1–0	Macaé	Recife
21:30 (UTC-3)	Grafite 59'	Report		Stadium: Estádio José do Rego Maciel (Arruda); Attendance: 10,270; Referee: Marcelo Aparecido R de Souza

29 August 2015 21	Paraná	3–2	Santa Cruz	Curitiba
16:30 (UTC-3)	Henrique 37'; Carlão 46', 54'	Report	Marcílio 6'; Lelê 65'	Stadium: Estádio Durival Britto e Silva (Vila Capanema); Attendance: 4,319; Referee: Wagner Reway

1 September 2015 22	Santa Cruz	2–1	América–MG	Recife
20:30 (UTC-3)	Luisinho 24'; Bruno Moraes 73'	Report	Tony 65'	Stadium: Estádio José do Rego Maciel (Arruda); Attendance: 8,532; Referee: Vinicius Furlan

4 September 2015 23	ABC	1–1	Santa Cruz	Natal
19:00 (UTC-3)	Rafael Oliveira 42'	Report	Moradei 25'	Stadium: Arena das Dunas; Attendance: 6,515; Referee: Bráulio da Silva Machado

8 September 2015 24	Santa Cruz	1–2	Paysandu	Recife
19:00 (UTC-3)	Grafite 61'	Report	Jhonnatan 33'; Betinho 83'	Stadium: Estádio José do Rego Maciel (Arruda); Attendance: 10,552; Referee: Paulo Roberto Alves Junior

12 September 2015 25	Santa Cruz	2–0	Luverdense	Recife
16:30 (UTC-3)	Rafael Alemão 29'; Daniel Costa 64'	Report		Stadium: Estádio José do Rego Maciel (Arruda); Attendance: 7,932; Referee: Charles Hebert Cavalcante Ferreira

15 September 2015 26	Boa Esporte	1–3	Santa Cruz	Varginha
21:30 (UTC-3)	Felipe Alves 69'	Report	Bruno Moraes 13', 52'; Daniel Costa 57'	Stadium: Estádio Municipal Prefeito Dilson Luiz de Melo (Melão); Attendance: 533; Referee: Josá Cláudio Rocha Filho

19 September 2015 27	Santa Cruz	2–1	Ceará	São Lourenço da Mata
16:30 (UTC-3)	Grafite 55'; Vítor 89'	Report	Ricardinho 67'	Stadium: Estádio Governador Carlos Wilson Campos (Arena Pernambuco); Attendance: 14,558; Referee: Antônio Neuriclaudio R. Costa

26 September 2015 28	Sampaio Corrêa	0–0	Santa Cruz	São Luís
16:30 (UTC-3)		Report		Stadium: Estádio Governador João Castelo (Castelão); Attendance: 10,241; Referee: Francisco Carlos do Nascimento

29 September 2015 29	Santa Cruz	3–1	Bragantino	Recife
21:00 (UTC-3)	Lelê 34'; Luisinho 55'; Bruninho 89'	Report	Alan Mineiro 59'	Stadium: Estádio José do Rego Maciel (Arruda); Attendance: 14,615; Referee: Francisco de Paula dos Santos Silva Neto

6 October 2015 30	CRB	3–2	Santa Cruz	Maceió
20:30 (UTC-3)	Diego Jussani 12'; Zé Carlos 70', 74'	Report	Grafite 29'; Luisinho 83'	Stadium: Estádio Rei Pelé; Attendance: 9,054; Referee: Marcos Andre Gomes da Penha

17 October 2015 31	Santa Cruz	1–3	Náutico	Recife
16:30 (UTC-3)	Bruno Moraes 30'	Report	Bergson 38'; Hiltinho 46', 56'	Stadium: Estádio José do Rego Maciel (Arruda); Attendance: 28,279; Referee: Leandro Pedro Vuaden

24 October 2015 32	Atlético Goianiense	0–0	Santa Cruz	Goiânia
17:30 (UTC-3)		Report		Stadium: Estádio do Governo do Estado de Goiás (Serra Dourada); Attendance: 2,606; Referee: Daniel Nobre Bins

27 October 2015 33	Santa Cruz	2–0	Criciúma	Recife
21:30 (UTC-3)	Bruno Moraes 14'; Raniel 74'	Report		Stadium: Estádio José do Rego Maciel (Arruda); Attendance: 6,879; Referee: Leo Simão Holanda

7 November 2015 34	Bahia	1–2	Santa Cruz	Salvador
17:30 (UTC-3)	Kieza 52'	Report	Danny Morais 65'; Bruno Moraes 82'	Stadium: Itaipava Arena Fonte Nova; Attendance: 29,965; Referee: André Luiz de Freitas Castro

10 November 2015 35	Santa Cruz	3–1	Oeste	Recife
21:30 (UTC-3)	Daniel Costa 22'; Danny Morais 44'; Luisinho 75'	Report	Rafael Martins 87'	Stadium: Estádio José do Rego Maciel (Arruda); Attendance: 24,600; Referee: Wagner do Nascimento Magalhães

14 November 2015 36	Botafogo	0–3	Santa Cruz	Rio de Janeiro
17:30 (UTC-3)		Report	Lelê 50'; Grafite 67'; Bruno Moraes 75'	Stadium: Estádio Olímpico Nilton Santos (Engenhão); Attendance: 23,035; Referee: Héber Roberto Lopes

21 November 2015 37	Mogi Mirim	0–3	Santa Cruz	Itu
17:30 (UTC-3)		Report	Daniel Costa 55'; Bruno Moraes 58'; Bileu 77'	Stadium: Estádio Municipal Dr. Novelli Júnior; Attendance: 1,400; Referee: Wilton Pereira Sampaio

28 November 2015 38	Santa Cruz	3–1	Vitória	Recife
17:30 (UTC-3)	Allan Vieira 36'; Daniel Costa 50'; Bruno Moraes 84'	Report	Vander 82'	Stadium: Estádio José do Rego Maciel (Arruda); Attendance: 36,622; Referee: José Cláudio Rocha Filho

==== Record ====
Final Position	Points	Matches	Wins	Draws	Losses	Goals For	Goals Away	Avg%
2nd	67	38	20	7	11	63	43	58%
