= 2016 Santa Cruz Futebol Clube season =

Santa Cruz
2016 season
- Chairman: Alírio Moraes
- Manager: Marcelo Martelotte; Adriano Teixeira (c); Milton Mendes; Ednelson da Conceição (c); Doriva
- Stadium: Estádio do Arruda
- Série A: 19th
- Pernambucano: Champions (29th title)
- Copa Sudamericana: Round of 16
- Copa do Brasil: Third round
- Copa do Nordeste: Champions (1st title)
- Top goalscorer: League: Grafite (13); All: Grafite (24)
Home colours	Away colours	Third colours

The 2016 season was Santa Cruz's 103rd season in the club's history. Santa Cruz competed in the Campeonato Pernambucano, Copa do Brasil, Copa Sudamericana, Copa do Nordeste and Série A.

== Squad ==
Note: Flags indicate national team as defined under FIFA eligibility rules; some limited exceptions apply. Players may hold more than one non-FIFA nationality.

No.	Pos.	Nation	Player
1	GK	BRA	Tiago Cardoso (captain)
2	DF	BRA	Léo Moura
3	DF	BRA	Neris
4	DF	BRA	Danny Morais
5	MF	BRA	Uillian Correia
6	DF	BRA	Tiago Costa
7	FW	BRA	Arthur Caíke
8	MF	BRA	Derley
9	FW	BRA	Bruno Moraes
10	MF	BRA	João Paulo
11	FW	BRA	Keno
12	GK	BRA	Edson Kölln
13	DF	BRA	Mario Sérgio
14	DF	BRA	Vítor
15	MF	BRA	Marcílio
16	MF	BRA	Wellington

No.	Pos.	Nation	Player
17	DF	BRA	Allan Vieira
18	MF	BRA	Danilo Pires
19	FW	BRA	Wallyson
20	DF	BRA	Wellington Silva
21	MF	BRA	Jadson
22	FW	BRA	Marion
23	FW	BRA	Grafite
24	GK	BRA	Luiz Miller
31	MF	BRA	Renatinho
32	FW	ARG	Matías Pisano
33	DF	BRA	Luan Peres
34	DF	BRA	Walter Guimarães
40	DF	BRA	Roberto
80	MF	BRA	Willams
—	FW	BRA	Mazinho

== Statistics ==
=== Overall ===
Games played	73 (14 Pernambucano, 12 Copa do Nordeste, 5 Copa do Brasil, 4 Copa Sudamericana, 38 Série A)
Games won	24 (5 Pernambucano, 7 Copa do Nordeste, 2 Copa do Brasil, 2 Copa Sudamericana, 8 Série A)
Games drawn	19 (6 Pernambucano, 3 Copa do Nordeste, 2 Copa do Brasil, 1 Copa Sudamericana, 7 Série A)
Games lost	30 (3 Pernambucano, 2 Copa do Nordeste, 1 Copa do Brasil, 1 Copa Sudamericana, 23 Série A)
Goals scored	86
Goals conceded	99
Goal difference	–13
Best results (goal difference)	5–1 (H) v Grêmio – Série A – 2016.11.27
Worst result (goal difference)	0–5 (A) v São Paulo – Série A – 2016.12.11
Top scorer	Grafite (24)

Source: Santa Cruz official website

=== Goalscorers ===
Place	Position	Nationality	Number	Name	Campeonato Pernambucano	Copa do Nordeste	Copa do Brasil	Copa Sudamericana	Série A	Total
1	FW	(Brazil)	23	Grafite	3	5	0	3	13	24
2	MF	(Brazil)	11	Keno	2	5	1	0	10	18
3	FW	(Brazil)	9	Bruno Moraes	1	2	4	1	3	11
4	MF	(Brazil)	8	Arthur Caíke	2	1	1	0	6	10
5	DF	(Brazil)	6	Tiago Costa	1	1	0	0	2	4
6	MF	(Brazil)	10	João Paulo	1	0	0	0	2	3
6	FW	(Brazil)	10	Lelê	2	0	0	0	1	3
6	DF	(Brazil)	7	Léo Moura	0	0	0	0	3	3
7	DF	(Brazil)	13	Rafael Alemão	1	1	0	0	0	2
7	FW	(Brazil)	19	Wallyson	1	1	0	0	0	2
8	DF	(Brazil)	15	Allan Vieira	1	0	0	0	0	1
8	MF	(Brazil)	10	Fernando Gabriel	0	0	0	0	1	1
8	MF	(Brazil)	17	Marcílio	0	0	0	0	1	1
8	MF	(Argentina)	32	Matías Pisano	0	0	0	0	1	1
8	DF	(Brazil)	6	Roberto	0	0	0	0	1	1
8	DF	(Brazil)	2	Vítor	0	0	0	0	1	1
				Total	15	16	6	4	45	86

=== Managers performance ===
Name	Nationality	From	To	P	W	D	L	GF	GA	Avg%	Ref
Marcelo Martelotte	Brazil	1 February 2016	23 March 2016	15	6	4	5	16	15	48%	
Adriano Teixeira (c)	Brazil	26 March 2016	11 December 2016	9	3	4	2	14	14	48%	
Milton Mendes	Brazil	3 April 2016	7 August 2016	30	9	9	12	31	35	40%	
Ednelson Conceição (c)	Brazil	27 April 2016	15 May 2016	3	3	0	0	8	2	100%	
Doriva	Brazil	21 August 2016	19 October 2016	16	3	2	11	17	33	23%	

(c) Indicates the caretaker manager

== Friendlies ==
=== Taça Chico Science ===
24 January 2016	Santa Cruz	3–1	Flamengo	Recife
11:00 (UTC-3)	Grafite 43' (pen.); João Paulo 52'; Arthur Caíke 90+1'	Report	Willian Arão 22'	Stadium: Estádio José do Rego Maciel (Arruda); Attendance: 15,858; Referee: Gilberto Castro Junior

=== National ===
27 January 2016	Santa Cruz	3–1	Botafogo–PB	Recife
(UTC-3)	Grafite 7'; Neris 25'; Allan Vieira 37'	Report	Müller 64'	Stadium: Estádio José do Rego Maciel (Arruda); Attendance: 4,268; Referee: Nielson Nogueira Dias

== Official Competitions ==
=== Campeonato Pernambucano ===
==== First stage ====
1 February 2016 1	Náutico	2–0	Santa Cruz	São Lourenço da Mata
21:30 (UTC-3)	Ronaldo Alves 48' (pen.); Bergson 87'	Report		Stadium: Estádio Governador Carlos Wilson Campos (Arena Pernambuco); Attendance: 9,296; Referee: Emerson Sobral

4 February 2016 2	Santa Cruz	1–1	Salgueiro	Recife
21:30 (UTC-3)	Grafite 71'	Report	Cássio Ortega 4'	Stadium: Estádio José do Rego Maciel (Arruda); Attendance: 6,909; Referee: Luiz Cláudio Sobral

11 February 2016 3	Santa Cruz	4–2	América–PE	Recife
21:30 (UTC-3)	Wallyson 19'; Bruno Moraes 38'; João Paulo 52'; Allan Vieira 90+2'	Report	Thiago Laranjeira 42'; Carlinhos Bala 68'	Stadium: Estádio José do Rego Maciel (Arruda); Attendance: 5,511; Referee: Gilberto Castro Júnior

21 February 2016 4	Sport	2–1	Santa Cruz	Recife
17:00 (UTC-3)	Luiz Antônio 51'; Túlio de Melo 80'	Report	Grafite 9'	Stadium: Estádio Adelmar da Costa Carvalho (Ilha do Retiro); Attendance: 14,609; Referee: Sebastião Rufino Filho

28 February 2016 5	Central	0–1	Santa Cruz	Caruaru
17:00 (UTC-3)		Report	Keno 67'	Stadium: Estádio Luiz José de Lacerda (Lacerdão); Referee: Emerson Sobral

5 March 2016 6	Santa Cruz	0–0	Central	Recife
17:00 (UTC-3)		Report		Stadium: Estádio José do Rego Maciel (Arruda); Attendance: 9,116; Referee: Diego Fernando Silva de Lima

13 March 2016 7	Salgueiro	3–0	Santa Cruz	Salgueiro
16:00 (UTC-3)	Rodolfo Potiguar 31' (pen.); Cássio Ortega 47'; Jhon 51'	Report		Stadium: Estádio Cornélio de Barros

20 March 2016 8	Santa Cruz	1–1	Náutico	Recife
16:00 (UTC-3)	Rafael Alemão 45'	Report	Daniel Morais 68'	Stadium: Estádio José do Rego Maciel (Arruda); Attendance: 12,010; Referee: Gilberto Castro Júnior

26 March 2016 9	América–PE	0–0	Santa Cruz	Recife
18:30 (UTC-3)		Report		Stadium: Estádio Adelmar da Costa Carvalho (Ilha do Retiro); Attendance: 1,148; Referee: Emerson Sobral

10 April 2016 10	Santa Cruz	1–1	Sport	Recife
16:00 (UTC-3)	Keno 33'	Report	Grafite 55' (o.g.)	Stadium: Estádio José do Rego Maciel (Arruda); Attendance: 16,377; Referee: Gleydson Leite

==== Semi-finals ====
20 April 2016	Santa Cruz	3–1	Náutico	Recife
21:45 (UTC-3)	Arthur Caíke 9', 53'; Tiago Costa 69'	Report	Joazi 87'	Stadium: Estádio José do Rego Maciel (Arruda); Attendance: 40,140; Referee: Sebastião Rufino Filho

24 April 2016	Náutico	1–2	Santa Cruz	São Lourenço da Mata
16:00 (UTC-3)	Ronaldo Alves 32'	Report	Grafite 52'; Lelê 90+2'	Stadium: Estádio Governador Carlos Wilson Campos (Arena Pernambuco); Attendance: 15,596; Referee: Emerson Luiz Sobral

==== Finals ====
4 May 2016	Santa Cruz	1–0	Sport	Recife
21:45 (UTC-3)	Lelê 31'	Report		Stadium: Estádio José do Rego Maciel (Arruda); Attendance: 30,163; Referee: Emerson Sobral

8 May 2016	Sport	0–0	Santa Cruz	Recife
16:00 (UTC-3)		Report		Stadium: Estádio Adelmar da Costa Carvalho (Ilha do Retiro); Referee: Sebastião Rufino Ribeiro Filho

==== Record ====
Final Position	Points	Matches	Wins	Draws	Losses	Goals For	Goals Away	Avg%
1st	21	14	5	6	3	15	14	50%

=== Copa do Nordeste ===
==== Group stage ====
14 February 2016 1	Santa Cruz	0–1	Bahia	Recife
17:00 (UTC-3)		Report	Juninho Valoura 20'	Stadium: Estádio José do Rego Maciel (Arruda); Attendance: 10,492; Referee: Charles Hebert Cavalcante Ferreira

17 February 2016 2	Confiança	0–2	Santa Cruz	Aracaju
22:30 (UTC-3)		Report	Grafite 54'; Rafael Alemão 60'	Stadium: Estádio Lourival Baptista (Batistão); Attendance: 3,211; Referee: Clizaldo L M Di Pace França

24 February 2016 3	Santa Cruz	1–1	Juazeirense	Recife
21:45 (UTC-3)	Grafite 65'	Report	Ricardo 23'	Stadium: Estádio José do Rego Maciel (Arruda); Attendance: 3,115; Referee: Emanuel Diniz de Araújo

2 March 2016 4	Juazeirense	0–1	Santa Cruz	Senhor do Bonfim
21:45 (UTC-3)		Report	Keno 49'	Stadium: Estádio Municipal Antônio Pedro Amorim Duarte; Attendance: 1,150; Referee: Antonio Dib Moraes de Sousa

8 March 2016 5	Santa Cruz	3–1	Confiança	Recife
21:30 (UTC-3)	Tiago Costa 11'; Keno 70'; Bruno Moraes 73'	Report	Caíque Sá 53'	Stadium: Estádio José do Rego Maciel (Arruda); Attendance: 7,133; Referee: Italo Medeiros de Azevedo

23 March 2016 6	Bahia	1–0	Santa Cruz	Salvador
21:45 (UTC-3)	Zé Roberto 83'	Report		Stadium: Itaipava Arena Fonte Nova; Attendance: 7,927; Referee: Francisco Carlos do Nascimento

==== Quarter-finals ====
30 March 2016	Santa Cruz	2–1	Ceará	Recife
21:45 (UTC-3)	Keno 52', 90'	Report	Rafael Costa 22'	Stadium: Estádio José do Rego Maciel (Arruda); Attendance: 9,563; Referee: Pablo dos Santos Alves

3 April 2016	Ceará	0–1	Santa Cruz	Fortaleza
16:00 (UTC-3)		Report	Wallyson 86'	Stadium: Estádio Governador Plácido Castelo (Castelão); Attendance: 18,568; Referee: José Reinaldo Figueiredo da Silva Filho

==== Semi-finals ====
13 April 2016	Santa Cruz	2–2	Bahia	Recife
21:45 (UTC-3)	Keno 45'; Grafite 57'	Report	Hernane 18'; Luisinho 84'	Stadium: Estádio José do Rego Maciel (Arruda); Attendance: 12,737; Referee: Claudio Francisco Lima e Silva

17 April 2016	Bahia	0–1	Santa Cruz	Salvador
16:00 (UTC-3)		Report	Grafite 13'	Stadium: Itaipava Arena Fonte Nova; Attendance: 22,490; Referee: José Ricardo Vasconcellos Laranjeira

==== Finals ====
27 April 2016	Santa Cruz	2–1	Campinense	Recife
21:45 (UTC-3)	Grafite 29'; Bruno Moraes 90+2'	Report	Tiago Sala 71'	Stadium: Estádio José do Rego Maciel (Arruda); Attendance: 36,106; Referee: Arilson Bispo da Anunciação

1 May 2016	Campinense	1–1	Santa Cruz	Campina Grande
16:00 (UTC-3)	Rodrigão 70'	Report	Arthur Caíke 78'	Stadium: Estádio Governador Ernani Sátyro (Amigão); Attendance: 17,859; Referee: Jailson Macedo Freitas

==== Record ====
Final Position	Points	Matches	Wins	Draws	Losses	Goals For	Goals Away	Avg%
1st	24	12	7	3	2	16	9	66%

=== Copa do Brasil ===
==== First round ====
16 March 2016	Rio Branco	0–1	Santa Cruz	Cariacica
21:45 (UTC-3)		Report	Bruno Moraes 90+4'	Stadium: Estádio Estadual Kléber José de Andrade; Attendance: 1,734; Referee: Leandro Newley Ferreira Belota

6 April 2016	Santa Cruz	0–0	Rio Branco	Recife
21:45 (UTC-3)		Report		Stadium: Estádio José do Rego Maciel (Arruda); Attendance: 2,690; Referee: Eduardo Tomaz de Aquino Valadão

==== Second round ====
11 May 2016	Vitória da Conquista	0–2	Santa Cruz	Vitória da Conquista
21:45 (UTC-3)		Report	Bruno Moraes 62', 86'	Stadium: Estádio Municipal Lomanto Júnior; Attendance: 2,944; Referee: Eduardo de Santana Nunes

==== Third round ====
13 July 2016	Vasco da Gama	1–1	Santa Cruz	Rio de Janeiro
21:45 (UTC-3)	Luan Garcia 89'	Report	Bruno Moraes 2'	Stadium: Estádio Vasco da Gama (São Januário); Attendance: 6,398; Referee: Joelson Nazareno Ferreira Cardozo

20 July 2016	Santa Cruz	2–3	Vasco da Gama	Recife
21:45 (UTC-3)	Keno 69'; Arthur Caíke 90+5'	Report	Andrezinho 51'; Yago Pikachu 64'; Jorge Henrique 90+3'	Stadium: Estádio José do Rego Maciel (Arruda); Attendance: 14,264; Referee: Igor Junio Benevenuto

==== Record ====
Final Position	Points	Matches	Wins	Draws	Losses	Goals For	Goals Away	Avg%
23rd	8	5	2	2	1	6	4	53%

=== Copa Sudamericana ===
==== Second stage ====
24 August 2016	Santa Cruz (Brazil)	0–0	(Brazil) Sport	São Lourenço da Mata
21:45 (UTC-3)		Report		Stadium: Estádio Governador Carlos Wilson Campos (Arena Pernambuco); Attendance: 5,517; Referee: Julio Bascuñan (Chile)

31 August 2016	Sport (Brazil)	0–1	(Brazil) Santa Cruz	São Lourenço da Mata
21:45 (UTC-3)		Report	Bruno Moraes 82'	Stadium: Estádio Governador Carlos Wilson Campos (Arena Pernambuco); Attendance: 6,750; Referee: Diego Haro (Peru)

==== Round of 16 ====
21 September 2016	Independiente Medellín (Colombia)	2–0	(Brazil) Santa Cruz	Medellín
19:45 (UTC-5)	Hechalar 38'; Cortés 87'	Report		Stadium: Estadio Atanasio Girardot; Referee: Raúl Orosco (Bolivia)

28 September 2016	Santa Cruz (Brazil)	3–1 (a)	(Colombia) Independiente Medellín	Recife
21:45 (UTC-3)	Grafite 13', 30', 70'	Report	Ibargüen 76'	Stadium: Estádio José do Rego Maciel (Arruda); Referee: José Argote (Venezuela)

==== Record ====
Final Position	Points	Matches	Wins	Draws	Losses	Goals For	Goals Away	Avg%
12th	7	4	2	1	1	4	3	58%

=== Série A ===
15 May 2016 1	Santa Cruz	4–1	Vitória	Recife
11:00 (UTC-3)	Grafite 28', 44'; Fernando Gabriel 84'; Keno 86'	Report	Kieza 79'	Stadium: Estádio José do Rego Maciel (Arruda); Attendance: 20,038; Referee: Pablo dos Santos Alves

21 May 2016 2	Fluminense	2–2	Santa Cruz	Volta Redonda
18:30 (UTC-3)	Gustavo Scarpa 57'; Gum 59'	Report	Grafite 52', 83'	Stadium: Estádio Municipal General Sylvio (Raulino de Oliveira); Attendance: 3,380; Referee: Jailson Macedo Freitas

25 May 2016 3	Santa Cruz	4–1	Cruzeiro	Recife
21:45 (UTC-3)	Grafite 19' (pen.), 65'; Arthur Caíke 76'; Keno 89'	Report	de Arrascaeta 52'	Stadium: Estádio José do Rego Maciel (Arruda); Attendance: 16,331; Referee: Anderson Daronco

28 May 2016 4	Chapecoense	1–1	Santa Cruz	Chapecó
21:00 (UTC-3)	Tiago Costa 83' (o.g.)	Report	Arthur Caíke 37'	Stadium: Arena Condá; Attendance: 4,734; Referee: Rafael Traci

1 June 2016 5	Santa Cruz	0–1	Sport	Recife
21:00 (UTC-3)		Report	Edmílson 9'	Stadium: Estádio José do Rego Maciel (Arruda); Attendance: 16,951; Referee: Raphael Claus

4 June 2016 6	Atlético Paranaense	1–0	Santa Cruz	Curitiba
16:00 (UTC-3)	Deivid 59'	Report		Stadium: Estádio Joaquim Américo Guimarães (Arena da Baixada); Attendance: 11,863; Referee: Wagner Reway

12 June 2016 7	Santa Cruz	0–2	Santos	Recife
19:00 (UTC-3)		Report	Zeca 45'; Joel Tagueu 65'	Stadium: Estádio José do Rego Maciel (Arruda); Attendance: 16,464; Referee: Elmo Alves Resende Cunha

15 June 2016 8	Santa Cruz	1–0	Figueirense	Recife
21:00 (UTC-3)	Lelê 26'	Report		Stadium: Estádio José do Rego Maciel (Arruda); Attendance: 10,019; Referee: Marcelo Aparecido R de Souza

18 June 2016 9	Palmeiras	3–1	Santa Cruz	São Paulo
16:00 (UTC-3)	Dudu 28', 65'; Jean 45+2'	Report	Grafite 51'	Stadium: Allianz Parque; Attendance: 34,162; Referee: Eduardo Tomaz de Aquino Valadão

22 June 2016 10	Santa Cruz	0–1	Flamengo	Recife
21:00 (UTC-3)		Report	Willian Arão 15'	Stadium: Estádio José do Rego Maciel (Arruda); Attendance: 12,739; Referee: Wagner Reway

25 June 2016 11	Corinthians	2–1	Santa Cruz	São Paulo
21:00 (UTC-3)	Luciano 26'; Romero 36'	Report	Grafite 52'	Stadium: Arena Corinthians; Attendance: 25,760; Referee: Wagner do Nascimento Magalhães

30 June 2016 12	Santa Cruz	0–3	Ponte Preta	Recife
19:30 (UTC-3)		Report	William Pottker 21', 38'; Felipe Azevedo 69'	Stadium: Estádio José do Rego Maciel (Arruda); Attendance: 8,517; Referee: Francisco Carlos do Nascimento

3 July 2016 13	Botafogo	2–1	Santa Cruz	Juiz de Fora
16:00 (UTC-3)	Sassá 1'; Neilton 17'	Report	João Paulo 48'	Stadium: Estádio Municipal Radialista Mário Helênio; Attendance: 5,423; Referee: Bráulio da Silva Machado

10 July 2016 14	Santa Cruz	1–0	Internacional	Recife
16:00 (UTC-3)	Keno 45+2'	Report		Stadium: Estádio José do Rego Maciel (Arruda); Attendance: 8,749; Referee: Sandro Meira Ricci

17 July 2016 15	América–MG	0–3	Santa Cruz	Belo Horizonte
11:00 (UTC-3)		Report	Tiago Costa 8'; Marcílio 16'; Arthur Caíke 55'	Stadium: Estádio Raimundo Sampaio (Independência); Attendance: 2,404; Referee: Grazianni Maciel Rocha

23 July 2016 16	Santa Cruz	0–1	Coritiba	Recife
18:30 (UTC-3)		Report	Kléber 32'	Stadium: Estádio José do Rego Maciel (Arruda); Attendance: 10,021; Referee: Wilton Pereira Sampaio

30 July 2016 17	Atlético Mineiro	3–0	Santa Cruz	Belo Horizonte
21:00 (UTC-3)	Robinho 22' br>Fred 67'; Luan 71'	Report		Stadium: Estádio Raimundo Sampaio (Independência); Attendance: 16,804; Referee: Dewson Fernando Freitas da Silva

4 August 2016 18	Grêmio	0–0	Santa Cruz	Porto Alegre
19:30 (UTC-3)		Report		Stadium: Arena do Grêmio; Attendance: 16,068; Referee: Luiz Flavio de Oliveira

7 August 2016 19	Santa Cruz	1–2	São Paulo	Recife
16:15 (UTC-3)	Keno 84'	Report	Chávez 39', 65'	Stadium: Estádio José do Rego Maciel (Arruda); Attendance: 12,552; Referee: Bruno Arleu de Araujo

14 August 2016 20	Vitória	2–2	Santa Cruz	Salvador
16:00 (UTC-3)	Diego Renan 5'; Willian Farias 47'	Report	Tiago Costa 36'; Pisano 82'	Stadium: Estádio Manoel Barradas (Barradão); Attendance: 6,797; Referee: Emerson de Almeida Ferreira

21 August 2016 21	Santa Cruz	0–1	Fluminense	Recife
16:00 (UTC-3)		Report	Henrique Dourado 30'	Stadium: Estádio José do Rego Maciel (Arruda); Attendance: 8,279; Referee: Luiz Flavio de Oliveira

28 August 2016 22	Cruzeiro	2–0	Santa Cruz	Belo Horizonte
11:00 (UTC-3)	Robinho 49'; Ábila 53'	Report		Stadium: Estádio Governador Magalhães (Mineirão); Attendance: 46,591; Referee: Sandro Meira Ricci

7 September 2016 23	Santa Cruz	2–2	Chapecoense	São Lourenço da Mata
16:00 (UTC-3)	Arthur Caíke 56'; Bruno Moraes 63'	Report	Kempes 27'; Bruno Rangel 86' (pen.)	Stadium: Estádio Governador Carlos Wilson Campos (Arena Pernambuco); Attendance: 12,265; Referee: Sávio Pereira Sampaio

11 September 2016 24	Sport	5–3	Santa Cruz	Recife
16:00 (UTC-3)	Durval 53'; Rodney Wallace 70'; Ruiz 80'; Vinícius Araújo 90'; Everton Felipe 90+2'	Report	Keno 6'; João Paulo 50'; Bruno Moraes 72'	Stadium: Estádio Adelmar da Costa Carvalho (Ilha do Retiro); Attendance: 11,688; Referee: Leandro Pedro Vuaden

14 September 2016 25	Santa Cruz	1–0	Atlético Paranaense	Recife
21:00 (UTC-3)	Bruno Moraes 90'	Report		Stadium: Estádio José do Rego Maciel (Arruda); Attendance: 2,471; Referee: Dewson Fernando Freitas da Silva

18 September 2016 26	Santos	3–2	Santa Cruz	São Paulo
18:30 (UTC-3)	Copete 5'; Jean Mota 72'; Vitor Bueno 86'	Report	Keno 40', 85'	Stadium: Estádio Municipal Paulo Machado de Carvalho (Pacaembu); Attendance: 24,586; Referee: Francisco Carlos do Nascimento

25 September 2016 27	Figueirense	3–1	Santa Cruz	Florianópolis
11:00 (UTC-3)	Ayrton 1'; Lins 37'; Danny Morais 60' (o.g.)	Report	Keno 65'	Stadium: Estádio Orlando Scarpelli; Attendance: 6,860; Referee: Paulo H Schleich Vollkopf

3 October 2016 28	Santa Cruz	2–3	Palmeiras	Recife
20:00 (UTC-3)	Arthur Caíke 55'; Grafite 69' (pen.)	Report	Zé Roberto 32'; Leandro Pereira 65'; Róger Guedes 79'	Stadium: Estádio José do Rego Maciel (Arruda); Attendance: 7,189; Referee: Dewson Fernando Freitas da Silva

9 October 2016 29	Flamengo	3–0	Santa Cruz	São Paulo
17:00 (UTC-3)	Vizeu 6'; Willian Arão 57'; Cirino 87'	Report		Stadium: Estádio Municipal Paulo Machado de Carvalho (Pacaembu); Attendance: 23,427; Referee: Ricardo Marques Ribeiro

12 October 2016 30	Santa Cruz	2–4	Corinthians	Cuiabá
20:45 (UTC-4)	Grafite 29'; Keno 80'	Report	Guilherme 37', 54'; Marlone 47'; Lucca 90+1'	Stadium: Arena Pantanal; Attendance: 7,947; Referee: Grazianni Maciel Rocha

16 October 2016 31	Ponte Preta	3–0	Santa Cruz	Campinas
18:30 (UTC-3)	Roger 51'; Maycon 69'; William Pottker 73'	Report		Stadium: Estádio Moisés Lucarelli; Attendance: 10,912; Referee: Ricardo Marques Ribeiro

19 October 2016 32	Santa Cruz	0–1	Botafogo	Recife
21:45 (UTC-3)		Report	Rodrigo Pimpão 87'	Stadium: Estádio José do Rego Maciel (Arruda); Attendance: 3,480; Referee: Bráulio da Silva Machado

29 October 2016 33	Internacional	1–1	Santa Cruz	Porto Alegre
18:30 (UTC-3)	Vitinho 6'	Report	Léo Moura 32'	Stadium: Estádio José Pinheiro Borda (Beira-Rio); Attendance: 35,376; Referee: Wilton Pereira Sampaio

6 November 2016 34	Santa Cruz	1–0	América–MG	Recife
17:00 (UTC-3)	Léo Moura 33'	Report		Stadium: Estádio José do Rego Maciel (Arruda); Attendance: 7,632; Referee: Luiz Flavio de Oliveira

16 November 2016 35	Coritiba	1–0	Santa Cruz	Curitiba
21:00 (UTC-3)	Leandro 75'	Report		Stadium: Estádio Major Antônio (Couto Pereira); Attendance: 8,055; Referee: Jean Pierre Goncalves Lima

20 November 2016 36	Santa Cruz	3–3	Atlético Mineiro	Recife
19:30 (UTC-3)	Grafite 13'; Keno 30'; Vítor 58'	Report	Fred 6'; Clayton 54'; Hyuri 79'	Stadium: Estádio José do Rego Maciel (Arruda); Attendance: 3,221; Referee: Wagner do Nascimento Magalhães

27 November 2016 37	Santa Cruz	5–1	Grêmio	Recife
19:30 (UTC-3)	Grafite 48', 87'; Léo Moura 60'; Roberto 86'; Arthur Caíke 90'	Report	Bolaños 53'	Stadium: Estádio José do Rego Maciel (Arruda); Attendance: 2,227; Referee: Ricardo Marques Ribeiro

11 December 2016 38	São Paulo	5–0	Santa Cruz	São Paulo
17:00 (UTC-2)	David Neres 1'; Gilberto 29'; Chávez 57', 72'; Luiz Araújo 81'	Report		Stadium: Estádio Municipal Paulo Machado de Carvalho (Pacaembu); Attendance: 16,553; Referee: Paulo Schleich Volkopff

==== Record ====
Final Position	Points	Matches	Wins	Draws	Losses	Goals For	Goals Away	Avg%
19th	31	38	8	7	23	45	69	27%
