= 2019 Campeonato Catarinense =

Campeonato Catarinense
- Season: 2019
- Dates: 16 January - 21 April
- Champions: Avaí (17th title)
- Relegated: Hercílio Luz; Metropolitano
- Copa do Brasil: Avaí; Chapecoense
- Série D: Marcílio Dias; Joinville; Tubarão
- Matches played: 93
- Goals scored: 200 (2.15 per match)
- Top goalscorer: Daniel Amorim (9 goals)

The Campeonato Catarinense de Futebol de 2019 da Série A, known as the 2019 Campeonato Catarinense, was the 94th season of Santa Catarina's top-flight football league. The season began on 16 January and ended on 21 April.

Avaí won on penalties their 17th title after beating Chapecoense in the final.

The defending champions were Figueirense but they were eliminated by Chapecoense in the semi-final.

== Format ==
The tournament was contested between 10 teams, who first played in a double round-robin in which the bottom two teams were relegated to next year's Série B. The final stage was a single-legged bracket contested by the top four teams. Only two places were available in the 2020 Copa do Brasil, while three places were available in the 2020 Série D.

== Participating teams ==
Club	Home city	2018 result	Titles (last)
Avaí	Florianópolis	6th	16 (2012)
Brusque	Brusque	7th	1 (1992)
Chapecoense	Chapecó	2nd	6 (2017)
Criciúma	Criciúma	4th	10 (2013)
Figueirense	Florianópolis	1st	18 (2018)
Hercílio Luz	Tubarão	8th	2 (1958)
Joinville	Joinville	5th	12 (2001)
Marcílio Dias	Itajaí	2nd (Série B)	1 (1963)
Metropolitano	Blumenau	1st (Série B)	0
Tubarão	Tubarão	3rd	0

== First phase ==
=== Table ===
Pos	Team	Pld	W	D	L	GF	GA	GD	Pts	Qualification or relegation
1	Avaí	18	12	3	3	34	7	+27	39	Advance to Final phase
2	Chapecoense	18	9	5	4	25	20	+5	32	Advance to Final phase
3	Figueirense	18	8	8	2	22	13	+9	32	Advance to Final phase
4	Criciúma	18	8	3	7	15	15	0	27	Advance to Final phase
5	Marcílio Dias	18	7	6	5	18	14	+4	27	
6	Brusque	18	5	5	8	17	21	−4	20	
7	Joinville	18	4	8	6	16	20	−4	20	
8	Tubarão	18	4	5	9	16	24	−8	17	
9	Metropolitano	18	4	4	10	13	32	−19	16	Relegation to 2020 Campeonato Catarinense Série B
10	Hercílio Luz	18	2	7	9	19	29	−10	13	Relegation to 2020 Campeonato Catarinense Série B

Rules for classification: 1) Points; 2) Matches won; 3) Goal difference; 4) Goals scored; 5) Head-to-head points; 6) Head-to-head goal difference; 7) Head-to-head away goals scored; 8) Fewest red cards received 9) Fewest yellow cards received 10) Draw.

=== Results ===
Home \ Away	AVA	BRU	CHA	CRI	FIG	HER	JEC	MCD	MET	TUB
Avaí	—	0–0	1–0	3–0	0–0	3–0	3–0	3–1	4–0	2–0
Brusque	0–4	—	2–3	0–0	1–2	1–0	1–1	1–0	6–1	1–0
Chapecoense	1–2	2–0	—	1–0	0–0	2–1	1–2	1–0	2–1	0–0
Criciúma	0–2	0–1	0–1	—	0–1	3–1	1–0	1–1	2–0	1–0
Figueirense	1–0	2–0	3–3	1–1	—	3–1	0–1	0–1	1–1	2–0
Hercílio Luz	1–0	1–1	2–3	0–1	1–1	—	0–0	0–2	4–0	1–1
Joinville	1–1	1–0	1–2	2–1	2–2	1–1	—	0–1	1–1	0–1
Marcílio Dias	1–0	1–1	2–0	1–2	0–0	2–2	1–1	—	0–1	0–0
Metropolitano	0–3	2–1	0–0	0–1	0–1	3–1	0–0	1–2	—	2–1
Tubarão	1–3	1–0	3–3	0–1	1–2	2–2	3–2	0–2	2–0	—

Legend: Blue = home team win; Yellow = draw; Red = away team win.

== Final phase ==
=== Bracket ===
Semifinals
1	Avaí (p)	1 (4)
4	Criciúma	1 (2)
2	Chapecoense	1
3	Figueirense	0

Final
1	Avaí (p)	1 (4)
2	Chapecoense	1 (2)

=== Semifinals ===
14 April 2019
16:00

Avaí	1–1	Criciúma
Daniel Amorim 48'	Report	Léo Gamalho 50'
Penalties
João Paulo (penalty scored); Gegê (penalty scored); Pedro Castro (penalty scored); Igor Fernandes (penalty scored)	4–2	(penalty scored) Daniel Costa; (penalty scored) Vinícius; (penalty missed) Wesley; (penalty missed) Marlon

Estádio da Ressacada, Florianópolis
Attendance: 9,618
Referee: Rafael Traci

14 April 2019
16:00

Chapecoense	1–0	Figueirense
Everaldo 59'	Report

Arena Condá, Chapecó
Attendance: 6,944
Referee: Rodrigo D' Alonso Ferreira

=== Final ===
21 April 2019
16:00

Avaí	1–1	Chapecoense
Alex Silva 75'	Report	Régis 41'
Penalties
João Paulo (penalty scored); Luan Pereira (penalty scored); Pedro Castro (penalty scored); Jones Carioca (penalty scored)	4–2	(penalty scored) Gustavo Campanharo; (penalty scored) Rafael Pereira; (penalty missed) Aylon; (penalty missed) Bruno Pacheco

Estádio da Ressacada, Florianópolis
Attendance: 15,876
Referee: Bráulio da Silva Machado

== General table ==
Pos	Team	Pld	W	D	L	GF	GA	GD	Pts	Qualification or relegation
1	Avaí	20	12	5	3	36	9	+27	41	Champions and 2020 Copa do Brasil
2	Chapecoense	20	10	6	4	27	21	+6	36	Runners-up and 2020 Copa do Brasil
3	Figueirense	19	8	8	3	22	14	+8	32	Eliminated in Semifinals
4	Criciúma	19	8	4	7	16	16	0	28	Eliminated in Semifinals
5	Marcílio Dias	18	7	6	5	18	14	+4	27	2020 Série D
6	Brusque	18	5	5	8	17	21	−4	20	
7	Joinville	18	4	8	6	16	20	−4	20	2020 Série D
8	Tubarão	18	4	5	9	16	24	−8	17	2020 Série D
9	Metropolitano	18	4	4	10	13	32	−19	16	Relegation to 2020 Campeonato Catarinense Série B
10	Hercílio Luz	18	2	7	9	19	29	−10	13	Relegation to 2020 Campeonato Catarinense Série B

Rules for classification: 1) Points; 2) Matches won; 3) Goal difference; 4) Goals scored; 5) Head-to-head points; 6) Head-to-head goal difference; 7) Head-to-head away goals scored; 8) Fewest red cards received 9) Fewest yellow cards received 10) Draw.

== Top goalscorers ==
No.	Player	Club	Goals
1	Daniel Amorim	Avaí	9
2	Nathan	Joinville	7
3	Getúlio	Avaí	6
3	Hélio Paraíba	Brusque	6
3	Júnior Pirambu	Metropolitano	6
6	Daniel Costa	Criciúma	5
6	João Paulo	Avaí	5
6	Matheus Lucas	Figueirense	5
