= Felipe Alves =

Felipe Alves may refer to:

- Felipe Alves (footballer, born 1988), Brazilian footballer, goalkeeper
- Felipe Alves (footballer, born May 1990), Brazilian footballer
- Felipe Alves (footballer, born November 1990), Brazilian footballer
