= Luanzinho =

Emirati footballer (born 2000)

Personal information
- Full name: Luan Martins Pereira
- Date of birth: 21 April 2000 (age 26)
- Place of birth: Ariquemes, Brazil
- Height: 1.73 m (5 ft 8 in)
- Position: Midfielder

Team information
- Current team: Sharjah
- Number: 11

Youth career
- 2014–2017: Avaí

Senior career*
Years	Team	Apps	(Gls)
2017–2020	Avaí	77	(2)
2020–	Sharjah	115	(25)

International career^{‡}
2017	Brazil U17	1	(0)
2025–	United Arab Emirates	16	(3)
- * Club domestic league appearances and goals as of 11 September 2025 ‡ National team caps and goals as of 17 November 2026

Luan Martins Pereira (born 21 April 2000), commonly known as Luanzinho or simply Luan, is a professional footballer who plays as a midfielder for UAE Pro League club Sharjah. Born in Brazil, he represents the United Arab Emirates national team.

== Club career ==
Born in Ariquemes, Rondônia, Luanzinho joined Avaí's youth setup in August 2014. In July 2017, he was promoted to the main squad by manager Claudinei Oliveira.

On 3 August 2017, Luanzinho made his first team – and Série A – debut, coming on as a second-half substitute for Wellington Simião in a 0–5 away loss against Atlético Paranaense. In September, he extended his contract until 2021.

== International career ==
A Brazilian citizen by birth and former player for Brazil at youth international level, Luanzinho was granted an Emirati passport in October 2023, making him eligible to represent the United Arab Emirates (UAE) national team through residency. In March 2025, made his international debut for the UAE against North Korea in a 2026 FIFA World Cup qualification match.

He scored his first international goal on 13 November that year, against Iraq in another 2026 World Cup qualification match.

== Personal life ==
His father Edson Pereira was a Vilhena former footballer, while his brother Renan was also a footballer and a midfielder; the latter was also groomed at Avaí, but died from a brain tumor in 2017.

== Career statistics ==
As of 4 April 2024

Club	Season	League			State League		Cup		Continental		Other		Total	
Club	Season	Division	Apps	Goals	Apps	Goals	Apps	Goals	Apps	Goals	Apps	Goals	Apps	Goals
Avaí	2017	Série A	19	0	0	0	0	0	—		—		19	0
Avaí	2018	Série B	17	1	13	0	5	2	—		—		35	2
Avaí	2019	Série A	17	0	10	1	4	0	—		—		31	1
Avaí	2020	Série B	0	0	1	0	0	0	—		—		1	0
Total			53	1	24	1	9	2	0	0	0	0	86	4
Sharjah	2019–20	UPL	4	1	—				—		—		4	1
Sharjah	2020–21	UPL	20	1	1	0			6	1	—		27	2
Sharjah	2021–22	UPL	22	3	3	1			2	0	—		27	4
Sharjah	2022–23	UPL	25	6	7	3			—		1	0	33	9
Sharjah	2023–24	UPL	19	7	1	0	1	2	4	2	—		19	8
Total			84	15	12	4	1	2	12	3	1	0	110	24
Career total			137	16	36	5	10	4	12	3	1	0	196	28

=== International goals ===
List of international goals scored by Luanzinho
No.	Date	Venue	Opponent	Score	Result	Competition
1	8 September 2025	Zabeel Stadium, Dubai, United Arab Emirates	Bahrain	1–0	1–0	Friendly
2	13 November 2025	Mohammad Bin Zayed Stadium, Abu Dhabi, United Arab Emirates	Iraq	1–1	1–1	2026 FIFA World Cup qualification
3	24 September 2026	King Abdullah Sports City Stadium, Jeddah, Saudi Arabia	Yemen	3–0	4–0	27th Arabian Gulf Cup

== Honours ==
Avaí

- Campeonato Catarinense: 2019

Sharjah

- UAE President's Cup: 2021–22, 2022–23
- UAE League Cup: 2022–23
- UAE Super Cup: 2022
- AFC Champions League Two: 2024–25
