= 2026 FIFA World Cup qualification – AFC fourth round =

International football competition

Tournament details
- Host countries: Qatar; Saudi Arabia
- Dates: 8–14 October 2025
- Teams: 6 (from 1 confederation)

Tournament statistics
- Matches played: 6
- Goals scored: 12 (2 per match)
- Attendance: 150,967 (25,161 per match)
- Top scorer(s): (Indonesia) Kevin Diks (Saudi Arabia) Firas Al-Buraikan (2 goals each)

The fourth round of AFC matches (also known as the Playoffs Group Stage)for the 2026 FIFA World Cup qualification were played in October 2025.

== Format ==
The third-place and fourth-place teams from the third round were divided into two groups of three teams. Each group played a round-robin tournament at a centralized venue. The winners of each group qualified directly for the 2026 FIFA World Cup, while the runners-up advanced to the fifth round.

On 13 June 2025, AFC confirmed Qatar and Saudi Arabia as the host countries. The hosts were originally to be determined based on the results of the third round. However, this was changed in March 2025, and a bidding process involving prospective teams during the third round was held to determine the hosts instead. The decision to hold the centralised playoff format in Qatar and Saudi Arabia was met with criticism from Indonesia, Iraq, Oman, and the United Arab Emirates over concerns of competitive advantage.

== Qualified teams ==
The following teams finished third or fourth in their respective third round groups:

- Indonesia
- Iraq
- Oman
- Qatar (hosts)
- Saudi Arabia (hosts)
- United Arab Emirates

== Draw ==
The fourth round draw took place on 17 July 2025 at the AFC House in Kuala Lumpur, Malaysia.

The seeding for the draw was based on a special release of the FIFA Men's World Rankings for Asian teams on 13 June 2025 (shown in parentheses below).

Pot 1	Pot 2	Pot 3
1. **Qatar** (53); 2. **Saudi Arabia** (58)	3. Iraq (59); 4. United Arab Emirates (66)	5. Oman (79); 6. Indonesia (118)

Note: Bold indicates team qualified for the World Cup. Italics indicates the team advanced to the fifth round.

== Schedule ==
The competition schedule was as follows:

Matchday	Date	Fixtures
Matchday 1	8 October 2025	3 v 1
Matchday 2	11 October 2025	2 v 3
Matchday 3	14 October 2025	1 v 2

== Group A ==
Pos	Team	Pld	W	D	L	GF	GA	GD	Pts	Qualification	(Qatar)	(United Arab Emirates)	(Oman)
1	Qatar (H)	2	1	1	0	2	1	+1	**4**	2026 FIFA World Cup	—	2–1	—
2	United Arab Emirates	2	1	0	1	3	3	0	**3**	Fifth round	—	—	2–1
3	Oman	2	0	1	1	1	2	−1	**1**		0–0	—	—

Source: AFC
Rules for classification: Tiebreakers
(H) Hosts
8 October 2025
18:00 UTC+3

Oman	0–0	Qatar
	Report (FIFA); Report (AFC)

Jassim bin Hamad Stadium, Al Rayyan
Attendance: 12,975
Referee: Yusuke Araki (Japan)

11 October 2025
20:15 UTC+3

United Arab Emirates	2–1	Oman
Meloni 76'; Caio 83'	Report (FIFA); Report (AFC)	Autonne 12' (o.g.)

Jassim bin Hamad Stadium, Al Rayyan
Attendance: 8,817
Referee: Alireza Faghani (Australia)

14 October 2025
20:00 UTC+3

Qatar	2–1	United Arab Emirates
Khoukhi 49'; Pedro 74'	Report (FIFA); Report (AFC)	Adil 90+8'

Jassim bin Hamad Stadium, Al Rayyan
Attendance: 13,038
Referee: Ilgiz Tantashev (Uzbekistan)

== Group B ==
Pos	Team	Pld	W	D	L	GF	GA	GD	Pts	Qualification	(Saudi Arabia)	(Iraq)	(Indonesia)
1	Saudi Arabia (H)	2	1	1	0	3	2	+1	**4**	2026 FIFA World Cup	—	0–0	—
2	Iraq	2	1	1	0	1	0	+1	**4**	Fifth round	—	—	1–0
3	Indonesia	2	0	0	2	2	4	−2	**0**		2–3	—	—

Source: AFC
Rules for classification: Tiebreakers
(H) Hosts
8 October 2025
20:15 UTC+3

Indonesia	2–3	Saudi Arabia
Diks 11' (pen.), 88' (pen.)	Report (FIFA); Report (AFC)	Abu Al-Shamat 17'; Al-Buraikan 36' (pen.), 62'

King Abdullah Sports City Stadium, Jeddah
Attendance: 40,634
Referee: Ahmed Al-Ali (Kuwait)

11 October 2025
22:30 UTC+3

Iraq	1–0	Indonesia
Iqbal 76'	Report (FIFA); Report (AFC)

King Abdullah Sports City Stadium, Jeddah
Attendance: 14,687
Referee: Ma Ning (China)

14 October 2025
21:45 UTC+3

Saudi Arabia	0–0	Iraq
	Report (FIFA); Report (AFC)

King Abdullah Sports City Stadium, Jeddah
Attendance: 60,816
Referee: Adham Makhadmeh (Jordan)

== Goalscorers ==
There were 12 goals scored in 6 matches, for an average of 2 goals per match.

2 goals

- (Indonesia national football team) Kevin Diks
- (Saudi Arabia national football team) Firas Al-Buraikan

1 goal

- (Iraq national football team) Zidane Iqbal
- (Qatar national football team) Boualem Khoukhi
- (Qatar national football team) Pedro Miguel
- (Saudi Arabia national football team) Saleh Abu Al-Shamat
- (United Arab Emirates national football team) Sultan Adil
- (United Arab Emirates national football team) Caio Lucas
- (United Arab Emirates national football team) Marcus Meloni

1 own goal

- (United Arab Emirates national football team) Kouame Autonne (against Oman)

== Discipline ==
A player was automatically suspended for the next match for the following infractions:

- Receiving a red card (red card suspensions may be extended for serious infractions)
- Receiving two yellow cards in two different matches (yellow card suspensions are carried forward to further qualification rounds, but not the finals or any other future international matches)

The following suspensions were served during the fourth round:

Team	Player	Infraction(s)	Suspended for match(es)
Iraq	Ali Al-Hamadi	(red card) vs South Korea (5 June 2025)	vs Indonesia (11 October 2025)
Saudi Arabia	Mohamed Kanno	(yellow card) (yellow-red card) vs Indonesia (8 October 2025)	vs Iraq (14 October 2025)
Iraq	Zaid Tahseen	(yellow card) (yellow-red card) vs Indonesia (11 October 2025)	vs Saudi Arabia (14 October 2025)

== See also ==
- 2026 FIFA World Cup qualification – AFC fifth round
