= Renanzinho (footballer, born 1997) =

Brazilian footballer

Personal information
- Full name: Renan Martins Pereira
- Date of birth: 19 September 1997
- Place of birth: Ariquemes, Brazil
- Date of death: 21 December 2017 (aged 20)
- Place of death: Florianópolis, Brazil
- Height: 1.73 m (5 ft 8 in)
- Position: Defensive midfielder

Youth career
- Laranja Mecânica
- 2011–2015: Avaí

Senior career*
| Years | Team | Apps | (Gls) |
| 2015–2017 | Avaí | 21 | (1) |
| Total | | 21 | (1) |
- * Club domestic league appearances and goals

Renan Martins Pereira (19 September 1997 – 21 December 2017), known as Renanzinho or simply Renan, was a Brazilian footballer who played as a defensive midfielder.

== Club career ==
Born in Ariquemes, Rondônia, Renan graduated with Avaí's youth setup, and made his senior debut on 4 March 2015, coming on as a late substitute for Renan Oliveira in a 0–2 away loss against Internacional de Lages for the Campeonato Catarinense championship. He was subsequently promoted to the main squad, being praised by manager Gilson Kleina.

On 11 May 2015 Renan made his Série A debut, starting in a 1–1 home draw against Santos. He scored his first professional goal on 5 July, netting his team's first in a 2–2 home draw against Sport Recife. After his disease, his contract was suspended, but the club still helped with the costs of his treatment.

== Doping ban ==
Renan tested positive for the prohibited substance octopamine in July 2015, and was subsequently handed a 1-month ban from sports.

== Death ==
In 2016, Renan was diagnosed with a brain tumor. He began treatment in the same year, with Avaí maintaining his contract, until 2018, active. On 21 December 2017, Avaí announced that Renan had died in the morning, as a result of complications from his brain tumour.

== Personal life ==
His father Edson Pereira was a Vilhena footballer, while his brother Luanzinho is also a footballer and a midfielder for the same club.

== Career statistics ==
As of 3 May 2016

| Club | Season | League | | | State League | | Cup | | Continental | | Other | | Total | |
| Club | Season | Division | Apps | Goals | Apps | Goals | Apps | Goals | Apps | Goals | Apps | Goals | Apps | Goals |
|---|---|---|---|---|---|---|---|---|---|---|---|---|---|---|
| Avaí | 2015 | Série A | 21 | 1 | 5 | 0 | 4 | 0 | — | | — | | 30 | 1 |
| Avaí | 2016 | Série B | 0 | 0 | 0 | 0 | 2 | 0 | — | | — | | 2 | 0 |
| Avaí | Total | | 21 | 1 | 5 | 0 | 6 | 0 | — | | — | | 32 | 1 |
| Career total | | | 21 | 1 | 5 | 0 | 6 | 0 | 0 | 0 | 0 | 0 | 32 | 1 |
