= 2026 FIFA World Cup qualification – AFC fifth round =

International football competition

- Event: FIFA World Cup Asian qualifiers
| United Arab Emirates | Iraq |
| (United Arab Emirates) | (Iraq) |
| 2 | 3 |

First leg
| United Arab Emirates | Iraq |
| 1 | 1 |
- Date: 13 November 2025
- Venue: Mohammed bin Zayed Stadium, Abu Dhabi
- Referee: Shaun Evans (Australia)
- Attendance: 32,008

Second leg
| Iraq | United Arab Emirates |
| 2 | 1 |
- Date: 18 November 2025
- Venue: Basra International Stadium, Basra
- Referee: Yusuke Araki (Japan)
- Attendance: 62,444

The AFC fifth round of the 2026 FIFA World Cup qualification (also known as the Playoffs Knockout Stage) were played from 13 to 18 November 2025. The matches were played between the United Arab Emirates and Iraq, to determine which team advanced to the inter-confederation play-offs.

== Format ==
The two second-placed teams in each group from the fourth round are playing against each other over two legs in 13–18 November 2025 to determine which team advances to the inter-confederation play-offs. The order of legs was determined by draw.

== Qualified teams ==
| Group (Fourth round) | Runners-up |
|---|---|
| A | United Arab Emirates |
| B | Iraq |

== Schedule ==
The competition schedule was as follows:

| Matchday | Date |
|---|---|
| First leg | 13 November 2025 |
| Second leg | 18 November 2025 |

== Summary ==
| Team 1 | Agg. | Team 2 | 1st leg | 2nd leg |
|---|---|---|---|---|
| United Arab Emirates | 2–3 | Iraq | 1–1 | 1–2 |

== Matches ==
=== First leg ===
13 November 2025
20:00 UTC+4

| United Arab Emirates | 1–1 | Iraq |
|---|---|---|
| Luanzinho 18' | Report (FIFA); Report (AFC) | Al-Hamadi 10' |

Mohammed bin Zayed Stadium, Abu Dhabi
Attendance: 32,008
Referee: Shaun Evans (Australia)

=== Second leg ===
The winner, Iraq, advanced to the inter-confederation play-offs.

18 November 2025
19:00 UTC+3

| Iraq | 2–1 | United Arab Emirates |
|---|---|---|
| Ali 66'; Al-Ammari 90+17' (pen.) | Report (FIFA); Report (AFC) | Caio 52' |

Basra International Stadium, Basra
Attendance: 62,444
Referee: Yusuke Araki (Japan)

== Goalscorers ==
There were 5 goals scored in 2 matches, for an average of 2.5 goals per match.

1 goal

- (Iraq national football team) Amir Al-Ammari
- (Iraq national football team) Ali Al-Hamadi
- (Iraq national football team) Mohanad Ali
- (United Arab Emirates national football team) Luanzinho
- (United Arab Emirates national football team) Caio Lucas

== See also ==
- 2026 FIFA World Cup qualification (inter-confederation play-offs)
