= Roberto (footballer, born December 1990) =

Brazilian footballer

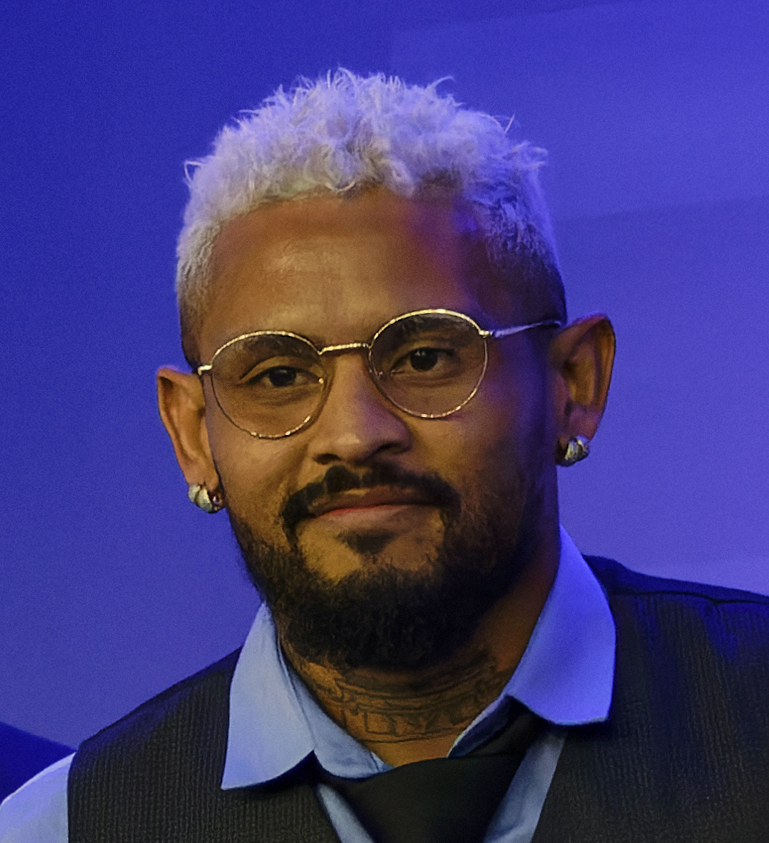

Personal information
- Full name: Roberto Heuchayer Santos de Araújo
- Date of birth: 4 December 1990 (age 35)
- Place of birth: Picos, Brazil
- Height: 1.76 m (5 ft 9 1/2 in)
- Position: Left back

Team information
- Current team: Caxias
- Number: 6

Youth career
- Bahia

Senior career*
Years	Team	Apps	(Gls)
2009–2011	Bahia	8	(2)
2011	Bahia de Feira	7	(1)
2011	Campinense	3	(0)
2012	Fluminense de Feira	5	(2)
2013	Feirense	0	(0)
2013	Icasa	25	(1)
2014–2016	Atlético Paranaense	10	(0)
2014	→ Ferroviária (loan)	14	(1)
2014	→ Náutico (loan)	12	(1)
2015	→ Ferroviária (loan)	13	(1)
2015	→ Bragantino (loan)	17	(1)
2016–2017	Santa Cruz	25	(2)
2017–2021	Chapecoense	54	(1)
2018	→ Londrina (loan)	21	(0)
2019	→ Figueirense (loan)	3	(0)
2021	Vitória	38	(2)
2022	Ituano	38	(1)
2023	Novorizontino	32	(2)
2024	Vila Nova	20	(1)
2024–2025	CSA	23	(1)
2026–	Caxias	25	(0)
- * Club domestic league appearances and goals as of 10 November 2026

Roberto Heuchayer Santos de Araújo (born 4 December 1990), simply known as Roberto, is a Brazilian footballer who plays for Caxias as a left back.

== Club career ==
Roberto was born in Picos, Piauí. A Bahia youth graduate, he made his professional debut on 30 May 2009, coming on as a second-half substitute for Ávine in a 0–0 away draw against Portuguesa.

Roberto scored his first professional goals seven days later, netting a double in a 4–0 home routing of ABC. Released by the club in 2011, he subsequently represented Bahia de Feira, Campinense, Fluminense de Feira, Feirense and Icasa before signing for Atlético Paranaense on 14 December 2013; he was, however, immediately loaned to Ferroviária.

On 21 May 2014 Roberto was loaned to Náutico, until the end of the year. On 15 May 2015, after another spell at Ferroviária, he joined Bragantino, still owned by Atlético.

On 25 August 2015 Roberto returned to Furacão. He made his Série A debut on 17 September, starting in a 1–2 home loss against Grêmio.

== Honours ==
Bahia de Feira

- Campeonato Baiano: 2011

Ferroviária

- Campeonato Paulista Série A2: 2015

Athletico Paranaense

- Campeonato Paranaense: 2016

Santa Cruz

- Taça Asa Branca: 2017

Chapecoense

- Campeonato Catarinense: 2020
- Campeonato Brasileiro Série B: 2020
