= Moradei =

Brazilian footballer

Personal information
- Full name: Daniel Moradei de Almeida
- Date of birth: February 8, 1986 (age 40)
- Place of birth: São Luís do Paraitinga, Brazil
- Height: 1.75 m (5 ft 9 in)
- Position: Defensive midfielder

Team information
- Current team: São Caetano

Youth career
- 2003: Taubaté

Senior career*
Years	Team	Apps	(Gls)
2004–2006	Taubaté		
2006	Ituano		
2007–2009	Bragantino		
2007	→ Corinthians (loan)	19	(0)
2009–2012	Corinthians		
2010	→ São Caetano (loan)	33	(2)
2012	→ São Caetano (loan)	0	(0)
2012–	São Caetano		
- * Club domestic league appearances and goals as of October 16, 2010

Daniel Moradei de Almeida, or simply Moradei (born February 8, 1986), is a Brazilian professional footballer who plays as a defensive midfielder for São Caetano in the Brazilian Série B.

== Career statistics ==
(Correct as of October 16, 2010)

Club	Season	State League		Brazilian Série A		Copa do Brasil		Copa Libertadores		Copa Sudamericana		Total	
Club	Season	Apps	Goals	Apps	Goals	Apps	Goals	Apps	Goals	Apps	Goals	Apps	Goals
Corinthians Paulista	2007	-	-	0	0	-	-	-	-	-	-	18	0
Corinthians Paulista	2009	-	-	0	0	-	-	-	-	-	-	31	1
Total		-	-	0	0	-	-	-	-	-	-	49	1
