= 2026 FIFA World Cup qualification (AFC) =

Tournament details
- Dates: 12 October 2023 – 18 November 2025
- Teams: 46 (from 1 confederation)

Tournament statistics
- Matches played: 225
- Goals scored: 630 (2.8 per match)
- Attendance: 5,057,905 (22,480 per match)
- Top scorer: (Qatar) Almoez Ali (12 goals)

The Asian section of the 2026 FIFA World Cup qualification acted as qualifiers for the 2026 FIFA World Cup for national teams of the Asian Football Confederation (AFC). AFC teams were allocated eight direct qualifying slots and one inter-confederation play-off slot.

The qualification process involved five rounds; the first two also serving as qualification for the 2027 AFC Asian Cup.

== Entrants ==
All FIFA-affiliated nations entered the joint qualification process for both the 2026 FIFA World Cup and 2027 AFC Asian Cup; Northern Mariana Islands, who are not members of FIFA, would have entered through the 2027 AFC Asian Cup qualification play-off round. However, the AFC excluded Northern Mariana Islands from the draw for the play-off round.

== Format ==
The qualification format was announced on 1 August 2022, having been revamped to fit the increased finals allocation of eight direct qualifiers and one play-off qualifier:

- First round: 20 teams (ranked 27–46) played home-and-away over two legs. The ten winners advanced to the second round. The best loser qualified for the 2027 AFC Asian Cup qualification third round, while the remaining teams qualified for the 2027 AFC Asian Cup qualification – play-off round.
- Second round: 36 teams (ranked 1–26 and ten first-round winners) were divided into nine groups of four teams. The teams played against each other on a home-and-away basis. The nine group winners and group runners-up advanced to the third round and automatically qualified for the 2027 AFC Asian Cup. The remaining teams qualified for the 2027 AFC Asian Cup qualification third round.
- Third round: 18 teams which advanced from the second round were divided into three groups of six teams. The teams played against each other on a home-and-away basis. The top two teams of each group qualified directly for the FIFA World Cup, the third- and fourth-placed teams advanced to the fourth round.
- Fourth round: Six third- and fourth-placed teams from the third round were divided into two groups of three teams each. The teams played against each other once in a centralized venue. The winners of each group qualified for the World Cup, and the runners-up of each group advanced to the fifth round.
- Fifth round: The group runners-up in the fourth round competed home-and-away over two legs to determine the Asian representation at the inter-confederation play-offs.

== Draw ==
The draw for the first and second rounds of joint qualification took place in Kuala Lumpur, Malaysia on 27 July 2023. The top 26 ranked teams were given byes to the second round, while the 20 teams entering the first round were seeded into two pots of 10 teams each and drawn alternately from pot 1 then pot 2 to form a pairing. The team from pot 1 hosted the first leg and the team from pot 2 hosted the second leg. Pots 1, 2 and 3 for the second round draw contained the teams ranked 1–9, 10–18, and 19–26, respectively, while pot 4 contained placeholders for the ten winners of the first round ties. Nine teams were drawn from pot 4 first and placed in position 4 of each group. The tenth team from pot 4 was moved to Pot 3, and subsequently drawn at random from Pot 3. Teams were then drawn into each group sequentially from pots 3, 2, and 1.

From the July 2023 FIFA World Rankings
Bye to second round			Competing in first round	
Pot 1	Pot 2	Pot 3	Pot 1	Pot 2
1. Japan (20); 2. Iran (22); 3. Australia (27); 4. South Korea (28); 5. Saudi Arabia (54); 6. Qatar (59); 7. Iraq (70); 8. United Arab Emirates (72); 9. Oman (73)	10. Uzbekistan (74); 11. China (80); 12. Jordan (82); 13. Bahrain (86); 14. Syria (94); 15. Vietnam (95); 16. Palestine (96); 17. Kyrgyzstan (97); 18. India (99)	19. Lebanon (100); 20. Tajikistan (110); 21. Thailand (113); 22. North Korea (115); 23. Philippines (135); 24. Malaysia (136); 25. Kuwait (137); 26. Turkmenistan (138)	27. Hong Kong (149); 28. Indonesia (150); 29. Chinese Taipei (153); 30. Maldives (155); 31. Yemen (156); 32. Afghanistan (157); 33. Singapore (158); 34. Myanmar (160); 35. Nepal (175); 36. Cambodia (176)	37. Macau (182); 38. Mongolia (183); 39. Bhutan (185); 40. Laos (187); 41. Bangladesh (189); 42. Brunei (190); 43. Timor-Leste (192); 44. Pakistan (201); 45. Guam (203); 46. Sri Lanka (204)

== Schedule ==
The competition schedule was as follows:

Round	Matchday	Date
First round	First leg	12 October 2023
First round	Second leg	17 October 2023
Second round	Matchday 1	16 November 2023
Second round	Matchday 2	21 November 2023
Second round	Matchday 3	21 March 2024
Second round	Matchday 4	26 March 2024
Second round	Matchday 5	6 June 2024
Second round	Matchday 6	11 June 2024

Round	Matchday	Date
Third round	Matchday 1	5 September 2024
Third round	Matchday 2	10 September 2024
Third round	Matchday 3	10 October 2024
Third round	Matchday 4	15 October 2024
Third round	Matchday 5	14–15 November 2024
Third round	Matchday 6	19 November 2024
Third round	Matchday 7	20 March 2025
Third round	Matchday 8	25 March 2025
Third round	Matchday 9	5 June 2025
Third round	Matchday 10	10 June 2025

Round	Matchday	Date
Fourth round	Matchday 1	8 October 2025
Fourth round	Matchday 2	11 October 2025
Fourth round	Matchday 3	14 October 2025
Fifth round	First leg	13 November 2025
Fifth round	Second leg	18 November 2025

== First round ==
Note: Bolded teams qualified for the second round of World Cup qualifying.

Team 1	Agg.	Team 2	1st leg	2nd leg
Afghanistan	2–0	Mongolia	1–0	1–0
Maldives	2–3	Bangladesh	1–1	1–2
Singapore	3–1	Guam	2–1	1–0
Yemen	4–1	Sri Lanka	3–0	1–1
Myanmar	5–1	Macau	5–1	0–0
Cambodia	0–1	Pakistan	0–0	0–1
Chinese Taipei	7–0	Timor-Leste	4–0	3–0
Indonesia	12–0	Brunei	6–0	6–0
Hong Kong	4–2	Bhutan	4–0	0–2
Nepal	2–1	Laos	1–1	1–0

== Second round ==
=== Group A ===
Pos	Team	Pld	W	D	L	GF	GA	GD	Pts	Qualification	(Qatar)	(Kuwait)	(India)	(Afghanistan)
1	Qatar	6	5	1	0	18	3	+15	**16**	World Cup qualifying third round and Asian Cup	—	3–0	2–1	8–1
2	Kuwait	6	2	1	3	6	6	0	**7**	World Cup qualifying third round and Asian Cup	1–2	—	0–1	1–0
3	India	6	1	2	3	3	7	−4	**5**	Asian Cup qualifying third round	0–3	0–0	—	1–2
4	Afghanistan	6	1	2	3	3	14	−11	**5**	Asian Cup qualifying third round	0–0	0–4	0–0	—

Source: FIFA, AFC
Rules for classification: Tiebreakers

=== Group B ===
Pos	Team	Pld	W	D	L	GF	GA	GD	Pts	Qualification	(Japan)	(North Korea)	(Syria)	(Myanmar)
1	Japan	6	6	0	0	24	0	+24	**18**	World Cup qualifying third round and Asian Cup	—	1–0	5–0	5–0
2	North Korea	6	3	0	3	11	7	+4	**9**	World Cup qualifying third round and Asian Cup	0–3 (Note: Japan were awarded a 3–0 victory by forfeit, after North Korea refused to host the match citing concerns about a disease spreading in Japan.)	—	1–0	4–1
3	Syria	6	2	1	3	9	12	−3	**7**	Asian Cup qualifying third round	0–5	1–0	—	7–0
4	Myanmar	6	0	1	5	3	28	−25	**1**	Asian Cup qualifying third round	0–5	1–6	1–1	—

Source: FIFA, AFC
Rules for classification: Tiebreakers

=== Group C ===
Pos	Team	Pld	W	D	L	GF	GA	GD	Pts	Qualification	(South Korea)	(China)	(Thailand)	(Singapore)
1	South Korea	6	5	1	0	20	1	+19	**16**	World Cup qualifying third round and Asian Cup	—	1–0	1–1	5–0
2	China	6	2	2	2	9	9	0	**8 (Note: Head-to-head points: China 4, Thailand 1.)**	World Cup qualifying third round and Asian Cup	0–3	—	1–1	4–1
3	Thailand	6	2	2	2	9	9	0	**8**	Asian Cup qualifying third round	0–3	1–2	—	3–1
4	Singapore	6	0	1	5	5	24	−19	**1**	Asian Cup qualifying third round	0–7	2–2	1–3	—

Source: FIFA, AFC
Rules for classification: Tiebreakers

=== Group D ===
Pos	Team	Pld	W	D	L	GF	GA	GD	Pts	Qualification	(Oman)	(Kyrgyzstan)	(Malaysia)	(Chinese Taipei)
1	Oman	6	4	1	1	11	2	+9	**13**	World Cup qualifying third round and Asian Cup	—	1–1	2–0	3–0
2	Kyrgyzstan	6	3	2	1	13	7	+6	**11**	World Cup qualifying third round and Asian Cup	1–0	—	1–1	5–1
3	Malaysia	6	3	1	2	9	9	0	**10**	Asian Cup qualifying third round	0–2	4–3	—	3–1
4	Chinese Taipei	6	0	0	6	2	17	−15	**0**	Asian Cup qualifying third round	0–3	0–2	0–1	—

Source: FIFA, AFC
Rules for classification: Tiebreakers

=== Group E ===
Pos	Team	Pld	W	D	L	GF	GA	GD	Pts	Qualification	(Iran)	(Uzbekistan)	(Turkmenistan)	(Hong Kong)
1	Iran	6	4	2	0	16	4	+12	**14**	World Cup qualifying third round and Asian Cup	—	0–0	5–0	4–0
2	Uzbekistan	6	4	2	0	13	4	+9	**14**	World Cup qualifying third round and Asian Cup	2–2	—	3–1	3–0
3	Turkmenistan	6	0	2	4	4	14	−10	**2**	Asian Cup qualifying third round	0–1	1–3	—	0–0
4	Hong Kong	6	0	2	4	4	15	−11	**2**	Asian Cup qualifying third round	2–4	0–2	2–2	—

Source: FIFA, AFC
Rules for classification: Tiebreakers

=== Group F ===
Pos	Team	Pld	W	D	L	GF	GA	GD	Pts	Qualification	(Iraq)	(Indonesia)	(Vietnam)	(Philippines)
1	Iraq	6	6	0	0	17	2	+15	**18**	World Cup qualifying third round and Asian Cup	—	5–1	3–1	1–0
2	Indonesia	6	3	1	2	8	8	0	**10**	World Cup qualifying third round and Asian Cup	0–2	—	1–0	2–0
3	Vietnam	6	2	0	4	6	10	−4	**6**	Asian Cup qualifying third round	0–1	0–3	—	3–2
4	Philippines	6	0	1	5	3	14	−11	**1**	Asian Cup qualifying third round	0–5	1–1	0–2	—

Source: FIFA, AFC
Rules for classification: Tiebreakers

=== Group G ===
Pos	Team	Pld	W	D	L	GF	GA	GD	Pts	Qualification	(Jordan)	(Saudi Arabia)	(Tajikistan)	(Pakistan)
1	Jordan	6	4	1	1	16	4	+12	**13**	World Cup qualifying third round and Asian Cup	—	0–2	3–0	7–0
2	Saudi Arabia (Note: Saudi Arabia already qualified for the Asian Cup as the host nation and only competed to qualify for the World Cup.)	6	4	1	1	12	3	+9	**13**	World Cup qualifying third round	1–2	—	1–0	4–0
3	Tajikistan	6	2	2	2	11	7	+4	**8**	Asian Cup qualifying third round	1–1	1–1	—	3–0
4	Pakistan	6	0	0	6	1	26	−25	**0**	Asian Cup qualifying third round	0–3	0–3	1–6	—

Source: FIFA, AFC
Rules for classification: Tiebreakers

=== Group H ===
Pos	Team	Pld	W	D	L	GF	GA	GD	Pts	Qualification	(United Arab Emirates)	(Bahrain)	(Yemen)	(Nepal)
1	United Arab Emirates	6	5	1	0	16	2	+14	**16**	World Cup qualifying third round and Asian Cup	—	1–1	2–1	4–0
2	Bahrain	6	3	2	1	11	3	+8	**11**	World Cup qualifying third round and Asian Cup	0–2	—	0–0	3–0
3	Yemen	6	1	2	3	5	9	−4	**5**	Asian Cup qualifying third round	0–3	0–2	—	2–2
4	Nepal	6	0	1	5	2	20	−18	**1**	Asian Cup qualifying third round	0–4	0–5	0–2	—

Source: FIFA, AFC
Rules for classification: Tiebreakers

=== Group I ===
Pos	Team	Pld	W	D	L	GF	GA	GD	Pts	Qualification	(Australia)	(Palestine)	(Lebanon)	(Bangladesh)
1	Australia	6	6	0	0	22	0	+22	**18**	World Cup qualifying third round and Asian Cup	—	5–0	2–0	7–0
2	Palestine	6	2	2	2	6	6	0	**8**	World Cup qualifying third round and Asian Cup	0–1	—	0–0	5–0
3	Lebanon	6	1	3	2	5	8	−3	**6**	Asian Cup qualifying third round	0–5	0–0	—	4–0
4	Bangladesh	6	0	1	5	1	20	−19	**1**	Asian Cup qualifying third round	0–2	0–1	1–1	—

Source: FIFA, AFC
Rules for classification: Tiebreakers

== Third round ==
=== Group A ===
Pos	Team	Pld	W	D	L	GF	GA	GD	Pts	Qualification	(Iran)	(Uzbekistan)	(United Arab Emirates)	(Qatar)	(Kyrgyzstan)	(North Korea)
1	Iran	10	7	2	1	19	8	+11	23	2026 FIFA World Cup	—	2–2	2–0	4–1	1–0	3–0
2	Uzbekistan	10	6	3	1	14	7	+7	21	2026 FIFA World Cup	0–0	—	1–0	3–0	1–0	1–0
3	United Arab Emirates	10	4	3	3	15	8	+7	15	Fourth round	0–1	0–0	—	5–0	3–0	1–1
4	Qatar	10	4	1	5	17	24	−7	13	Fourth round	1–0	3–2	1–3	—	3–1	5–1
5	Kyrgyzstan	10	2	2	6	12	18	−6	8		2–3	2–3	1–1	3–1	—	1–0
6	North Korea	10	0	3	7	9	21	−12	3		2–3	0–1	1–2	2–2	2–2	—

Source: AFC, FIFA
Rules for classification: Tiebreakers

=== Group B ===
Pos	Team	Pld	W	D	L	GF	GA	GD	Pts	Qualification	(South Korea)	(Jordan)	(Iraq)	(Oman)	(Palestine)	(Kuwait)
1	South Korea	10	6	4	0	20	7	+13	22	2026 FIFA World Cup	—	1–1	3–2	1–1	0–0	4–0
2	Jordan	10	4	4	2	16	8	+8	16	2026 FIFA World Cup	0–2	—	0–1	4–0	3–1	1–1
3	Iraq	10	4	3	3	9	9	0	15	Fourth round	0–2	0–0	—	1–0	1–0	2–2
4	Oman	10	3	2	5	9	14	−5	11	Fourth round	1–3	0–3	0–1	—	1–0	4–0
5	Palestine	10	2	4	4	10	13	−3	10		1–1	1–3	2–1	1–1	—	2–2
6	Kuwait	10	0	5	5	7	20	−13	5		1–3	1–1	0–0	0–1	0–2	—

Source: AFC, FIFA
Rules for classification: Tiebreakers

=== Group C ===
Pos	Team	Pld	W	D	L	GF	GA	GD	Pts	Qualification	(Japan)	(Australia)	(Saudi Arabia)	(Indonesia)	(China)	(Bahrain)
1	Japan	10	7	2	1	30	3	+27	23	2026 FIFA World Cup	—	1–1	0–0	6–0	7–0	2–0
2	Australia	10	5	4	1	16	7	+9	19	2026 FIFA World Cup	1–0	—	0–0	5–1	3–1	0–1
3	Saudi Arabia	10	3	4	3	7	8	−1	13	Fourth round	0–2	1–2	—	1–1	1–0	0–0
4	Indonesia	10	3	3	4	9	20	−11	12	Fourth round	0–4	0–0	2–0	—	1–0	1–0
5	China	10	3	0	7	7	20	−13	9		1–3	0–2	1–2	2–1	—	1–0
6	Bahrain	10	1	3	6	5	16	−11	6		0–5	2–2	0–2	2–2	0–1	—

Source: AFC, FIFA
Rules for classification: Tiebreakers

== Fourth round ==
=== Group A ===
Pos	Team	Pld	W	D	L	GF	GA	GD	Pts	Qualification	(Qatar)	(United Arab Emirates)	(Oman)
1	Qatar (H)	2	1	1	0	2	1	+1	**4**	2026 FIFA World Cup	—	2–1	—
2	United Arab Emirates	2	1	0	1	3	3	0	**3**	Fifth round	—	—	2–1
3	Oman	2	0	1	1	1	2	−1	**1**		0–0	—	—

Source: AFC
Rules for classification: Tiebreakers
(H) Hosts

=== Group B ===
Pos	Team	Pld	W	D	L	GF	GA	GD	Pts	Qualification	(Saudi Arabia)	(Iraq)	(Indonesia)
1	Saudi Arabia (H)	2	1	1	0	3	2	+1	**4**	2026 FIFA World Cup	—	0–0	—
2	Iraq	2	1	1	0	1	0	+1	**4**	Fifth round	—	—	1–0
3	Indonesia	2	0	0	2	2	4	−2	**0**		2–3	—	—

Source: AFC
Rules for classification: Tiebreakers
(H) Hosts

== Fifth round ==
The two second-placed teams from the fourth round played against each other over two legs in November 2025 to determine which team advanced to the inter-confederation play-offs.

Team 1	Agg.	Team 2	1st leg	2nd leg
United Arab Emirates	2–3	Iraq	1–1	1–2

== Inter-confederation play-offs ==
The winner of the fifth round, Iraq, joined Bolivia (from CONMEBOL), DR Congo (from CAF), Jamaica and Suriname (both from CONCACAF), and New Caledonia (from OFC) in the inter-confederation play-offs.

The teams were ranked according to the November 2025 FIFA Men's World Ranking, with the four lowest-ranked teams playing in two single-elimination matches. The winners met the two highest-ranked teams in another set of single-elimination matches, with the winners of these matches qualifying for the 2026 FIFA World Cup.

Semi-final
26 March 2026 – Guadalupe
**Bolivia**	**2**
Suriname	1

Final
31 March 2026 – Guadalupe
**Iraq**	**2**
Bolivia	1

== Qualified teams ==
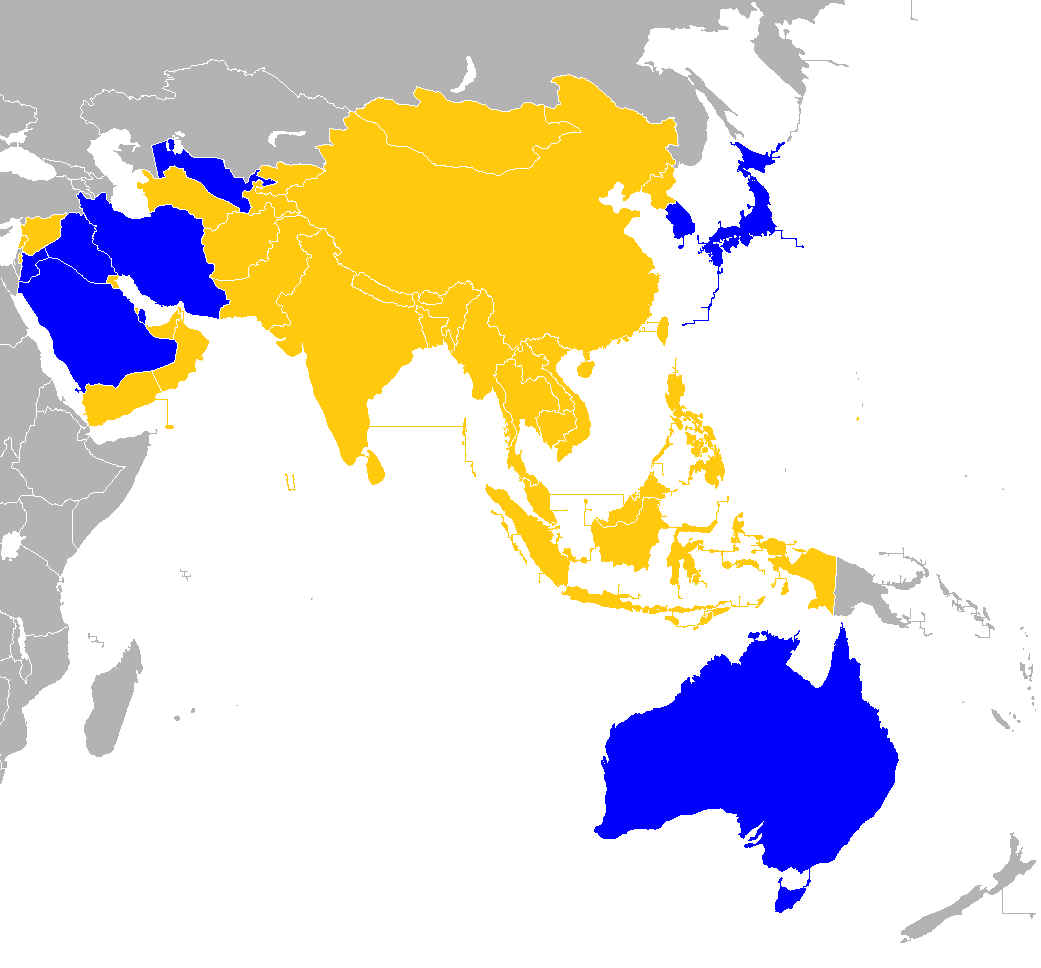
Qualified for the World Cup Failed to qualify Not an AFC member

The following teams from AFC qualified for the final tournament.

Team	Qualified as	Qualified on	Previous appearances in FIFA World Cup (Note: Italics indicates hosts for that year.)
Japan	Third round group C winners	20 March 2025	7 (1998, 2002, 2006, 2010, 2014, 2018, 2022)
Iran	Third round group A winners	25 March 2025	6 (1978, 1998, 2006, 2014, 2018, 2022)
Uzbekistan	Third round group A runners-up	5 June 2025	Debut (Note: Until 1991, Uzbekistan was part of the Soviet Union, which competed at seven World Cup tournaments. FIFA considers Russia to be the successor team of the Soviet Union.)
South Korea	Third round group B winners	5 June 2025	11 (1954, 1986, 1990, 1994, 1998, 2002, 2006, 2010, 2014, 2018, 2022)
Jordan	Third round group B runners-up	5 June 2025	Debut
Australia	Third round group C runners-up	10 June 2025	6 (1974 (Note: Australia qualified as a member of the OFC in 1974 and 2006 (qualifying took place until 2005, and they left the OFC for the AFC in 2006), and qualified as a member of the AFC for first time in 2010.), 2006, 2010, 2014, 2018, 2022)
Qatar	Fourth round group A winners	14 October 2025	1 (2022)
Saudi Arabia	Fourth round group B winners	14 October 2025	6 (1994, 1998, 2002, 2006, 2018, 2022)
Iraq	Inter-confederation play-offs Pathway 2 winners	31 March 2026	1 (1986)

== Top goalscorers ==
There were 630 goals scored in 225 matches, for an average of 2.8 goals per match.

12 goals

- (Qatar national football team) Almoez Ali

10 goals

- (Iran national football team) Mehdi Taremi
- (South Korea national football team) Son Heung-min

9 goals

- (Jordan national football team) Ali Olwan

8 goals

- (Iran national football team) Sardar Azmoun
- (Iraq national football team) Aymen Hussein
- (Japan national football team) Ayase Ueda
- (Jordan national football team) Yazan Al-Naimat
- (United Arab Emirates national football team) Fábio Lima

7 goals

- (Jordan national football team) Musa Al-Taamari

6 goals

- (Australia men's national soccer team) Kusini Yengi
- (Japan national football team) Kōki Ogawa
- (Kyrgyzstan national football team) Joel Kojo
- (United Arab Emirates national football team) Harib Abdalla

5 goals

- (China national football team) Wu Lei
- (Iran national football team) Mohammad Mohebi
- (Japan national football team) Daichi Kamada
- (Kuwait national football team) Yousef Nasser
- (North Korea national football team) Jong Il-gwan
- (Oman national football team) Abdulrahman Al-Mushaifri
- (Saudi Arabia national football team) Firas Al-Buraikan
- (South Korea national football team) Lee Jae-sung
- (South Korea national football team) Lee Kang-in
- (United Arab Emirates national football team) Sultan Adil
- (Uzbekistan national football team) Eldor Shomurodov

Below are full goalscorer lists for each round:

- First round
- Second round
- Third round
- Fourth round
- Fifth round

== See also ==
- 2027 AFC Asian Cup qualification
