= Bileu =

Brazilian footballer (born 1989)

Personal information
- Full name: Josileudo Rodrigues de Araujo
- Date of birth: 28 March 1989 (age 37)
- Place of birth: Aurora, Brazil
- Height: 1.80 m (5 ft 11 in)
- Position: Midfielder

Team information
- Current team: Santa Cruz
- Number: 22

Senior career*
Years	Team	Apps	(Gls)
2006–2007	Fortaleza		
2007–2009	Atlético Paranaense		
2009	→ Sousa (loan)		
2010–2012	ABC	33	(2)
2012–2014	Villa Rio	0	(0)
2012–2013	→ ABC (loan)	62	(3)
2014	→ Sport (loan)	0	(0)
2014–2016	Bangu	0	(0)
2014–2015	→ Santa Cruz (loan)	37	(1)
2016	→ Linense (loan)	0	(0)
2016–2017	Tombense	17	(2)
2017	→ Botafogo–SP (loan)	0	(0)
2017	→ Cuiabá (loan)	13	(1)
2017	→ Santa Cruz (loan)	0	(0)
2018	Linense	0	(0)
2018	Atlético Goianiense	5	(0)
2018–2019	Volta Redonda	28	(0)
2020–	Santa Cruz	33	(0)
- * Club domestic league appearances and goals as of 23:56, 16 August 2020 (UTC)

Josileudo Rodrigues de Araujo (born 28 March 1989), known as Bileu, is a Brazilian footballer who plays for Santa Cruz as a midfielder.

== Career statistics ==
As of 30 January 2018

Club	Season	League			State League		Cup		Continental		Other		Total	
Club	Season	Division	Apps	Goals	Apps	Goals	Apps	Goals	Apps	Goals	Apps	Goals	Apps	Goals
ABC	2010	Série C	7	1	—		—		—		—		7	1
ABC	2011	Série B	26	1	—		3	0	—		—		29	1
ABC	2012	Série B	31	2	—		3	0	—		—		34	2
ABC	2013	Série B	31	1	—		4	0	—		4 (Note: All appearance(s) in Copa do Nordeste)	0	39	1
ABC	Subtotal		95	5	0	0	10	0	—		4	0	109	5
Sport	2014	Série A	0	0	3	0	2	0	—		3	0	8	0
Santa Cruz	2014	Série B	20	0	—		—		—		—		20	0
Santa Cruz	2015	Série B	17	1	12	0	—		—		—		29	1
Santa Cruz	Subtotal		37	1	12	0	—		—		—		49	1
Linense	2016	Série D	—		11	1	0	0	—		—		11	1
Tombense	2016	Série C	17	2	—		—		—		—		17	2
Botafogo–SP	2017	Série C	—		13	0	—		—		—		13	0
Cuiabá	2017	Série C	13	1	—		—		—		—		13	1
Linense	2018	Série D	—		4	0	—		—		—		4	0
Career total			162	9	43	1	12	0	0	0	7	0	224	10
