= Marlon (footballer, born 1993) =

Brazilian footballer

Personal information
- Full name: Marlon Bruno Mariano de Souza
- Date of birth: May 5, 1993 (age 33)
- Place of birth: Rio de Janeiro, Brazil
- Height: 1.89 m (6 ft 2 in)
- Position: Left back

Team information
- Current team: ABC

Youth career
- 2008–2012: Internacional
- 2013: → Cruzeiro (loan)

Senior career*
Years	Team	Apps	(Gls)
2014–2015	Internacional	0	(0)
2014	→ Ferroviária (loan)	13	(0)
2015–2016	Salgueiro	8	(0)
2015	→ Santa Cruz (loan)	21	(0)
2016–2018	Figueirense	1	(0)
2018	→ Atlético Tubarão (loan)	2	(0)
2018	Bragantino	4	(0)
2019	Portuguesa Santista	0	(0)
2020–	ABC	0	(0)
- * Club domestic league appearances and goals as of 00:01, 8 April 2020 (UTC)

Marlon Bruno Mariano de Souza (born May 5, 1993 in Rio de Janeiro), known as just Marlon, is a Brazilian football left-back who currently plays for ABC Futebol Clube.
