= Edson Sitta =

Brazilian footballer (born 1983)

Edson Sitta-
Personal information
- Full name: Edson Feliciano Sitta
- Date of birth: 17 June 1983 (age 43)
- Place of birth: São Bernardo do Campo, Brazil
- Height: 1.80 m (5 ft 11 in)
- Position: Right-back

Youth career
- 2002: Guarani

Senior career*
Years	Team	Apps	(Gls)
2003–2004	Juventus-SP	17	(0)
2004–2007	Corinthians	72	(4)
2008–2009	C.D. Nacional	30	(2)
2010	Ceará		
2010–2012	Vitória de Guimarães	17	(0)
2012	Beira-Mar	2	(0)
2013	Atlético Sorocaba		
2013–2014	Paraná	62	(2)
2015	Santa Cruz	16	(0)
2015–2017	Bragantino	82	(9)
2018	Água Santa	9	(0)
- * Club domestic league appearances and goals

Edson Feliciano Sitta or simply Edson Sitta (born 17 June 1983) is a Brazilian former footballer who played as a right-back

== Honours ==
- Brazilian League: 2005
