= Lelê (footballer, born 1990) =

Brazilian footballer

Personal information
- Full name: Wesley de Jesus Correia
- Date of birth: 9 February 1990 (age 36)
- Place of birth: Diadema, Brazil
- Height: 1.67 m (5 ft 6 in)
- Position: Forward

Team information
- Current team: Jaguar

Youth career
- 2007–2009: São Bernardo
- 2009–2010: Coritiba

Senior career*
Years	Team	Apps	(Gls)
2010–2012	Coritiba	3	(0)
2011	→ Fortaleza (loan)	2	(0)
2012	→ Rio Branco–PR (loan)	10	(0)
2012	→ Oeste (loan)	21	(0)
2013–2015	Oeste	102	(9)
2015–2016	Santa Cruz	45	(8)
2016–2017	Ceará	37	(8)
2018	Botafogo	4	(0)
2018	Náutico	13	(0)
2019	Mirassol	8	(0)
2019	Al-Muharraq	?	(2)
2020	América-RN	8	(3)
2020	ABC	10	(3)
2021–2023	Água Santa	36	(1)
2021	→ Santa Cruz (loan)	4	(0)
2022	→ São Bernardo (loan)	9	(0)
2023	Altos	10	(1)
2024	Portuguesa Santista	14	(0)
2024	Água Santa	5	(0)
2025	Maguary	6	(0)
2026	Jaguar	6	(0)
- * Club domestic league appearances and goals as of 23 July 2023

Wesley de Jesus Correia (born 9 February 1990), known as Lelê, is a Brazilian footballer who plays for Jaguar as forward.

== Career statistics ==
As of 3 March 2017

Club	Season	League			State League		Cup		Conmebol		Other		Total	
Club	Season	Division	Apps	Goals	Apps	Goals	Apps	Goals	Apps	Goals	Apps	Goals	Apps	Goals
Coritiba	2010	Série B	1	0	—		—		—		—		1	0
Coritiba	2011	Série A	—		2	0	1	0	—		—		3	0
Coritiba	Subtotal		1	0	2	0	1	0	—		—		4	0
Fortaleza	2011	Série C	2	0	—		—		—		—		2	0
Rio Branco–PR	2012	Paranaense	—		10	0	—		—		—		10	0
Oeste	2012	Série C	21	0	—		—		—		—		21	0
Oeste	2013	Série B	33	3	15	2	—		—		—		48	5
Oeste	2014	Série B	28	1	13	2	—		—		—		41	3
Oeste	2015	Série B	—		13	1	—		—		—		13	1
Oeste	Subtotal		82	4	41	5	—		—		—		123	9
Santa Cruz	2015	Série B	24	5	—		—		—		—		24	5
Santa Cruz	2016	Série A	10	1	11	2	2	0	—		7 (Note: Appearances in Copa do Nordeste)	0	30	3
Santa Cruz	Subtotal		34	6	11	2	2	0	—		7	0	54	8
Ceará	2016	Série B	11	3	—		—		—		—		11	3
Ceará	2017	Série B	0	0	5	1	—		—		2 (Note: Appearances in Primeira Liga)	0	7	1
Ceará	Subtotal		11	3	5	1	—		—		2	0	18	4
Career total			130	13	69	8	3	0	0	0	9	0	211	21
