= Alemão (footballer, born 1986) =

Brazilian footballer (born 1986)

Personal information
- Full name: Rafael Berger
- Date of birth: 14 July 1986 (age 40)
- Place of birth: Vitória, Brazil
- Height: 1.88 m (6 ft 2 in)
- Position: Centre back

Team information
- Current team: Criciúma

Senior career*
Years	Team	Apps	(Gls)
2006	Tupy		
2007	Guarapari		
2008	Marília	3	(0)
2009	Mineiros		
2010	América-SP	1	(0)
2010	Campinense	8	(1)
2011–2012	Salgueiro	49	(5)
2012–2013	Náutico	24	(0)
2013	Cuiabá	6	(1)
2014	Ituano	17	(2)
2014	Vitória	11	(0)
2014–2016	Santa Cruz	61	(7)
2016–2017	Al-Faisaly	13	(1)
2017	Vila Nova	36	(3)
2018	Pohang Steelers	9	(1)
2019–2020	Figueirense	74	(6)
2021–	Criciúma	12	(0)
- * Club domestic league appearances and goals as of 12:44, 13 December 2018 (UTC)

Rafael Berger (born 14 July 1986), commonly known as Alemão, is a Brazilian footballer who plays as a central defender for Criciúma.

== Club career ==
On 12 December 2018, Alemão joined Série B side Figueirense from South Korean side Pohang Steelers on a contract until the end of 2020.

== Honours ==
Ituano

- Campeonato Paulista: 2014

Santa Cruz

- Copa do Nordeste: 2016
- Campeonato Pernambucano: 2015, 2016

== Personal life ==
Rafael is married with Syusk Amorim Berger and they have an adolescent son, Rafael Júnior.
