= Nathan (footballer, born 1994) =

Brazilian footballer

Personal information
- Full name: Nathan Athaydes Campos Ferreira
- Date of birth: January 18, 1994 (age 32)
- Place of birth: Porto Alegre, Brazil
- Height: 1.76 m (5 ft 9 in)
- Position: Winger

Team information
- Current team: Marcílio Dias

Youth career
- 2002–2012: Internacional

Senior career*
Years	Team	Apps	(Gls)
2013–2015	Internacional	2	(0)
2014	→ Ponte Preta (loan)	2	(0)
2015	→ Santa Cruz (loan)	13	(2)
2016	Operário Ferroviário	1	(0)
2016	Brasil de Pelotas	8	(0)
2017	Ceará	4	(0)
2017	Paraná	6	(0)
2017	Goiás	13	(1)
2017–2018	Caxias do Sul	12	(1)
2019	Joinville	17	(7)
2019	Londrina	4	(0)
2019	→ São José (loan)	6	(0)
2020	Brasil de Pelotas	13	(0)
2021–	Marcílio Dias	6	(0)

International career
2011	Brazil U17	6	(0)
- * Club domestic league appearances and goals as of 23:42, March 2, 2020 (UTC)

Nathan Athaydes Campos Ferreira (born January 18, 1994), known as Nathan, is a Brazilian professional footballer who plays as a winger for Marcílio Dias.

== Career ==
In Inter's youth always stands out, in 2011 turned out to be summoned by the Brazil U17. His professional debut took place on October 17, 2013, in game valid for Série A against the Santos by a score of 0–0.
