= Felipe Alves (footballer, born May 1990) =

Brazilian footballer

Personal information
- Full name: Felipe Alves de Lima
- Date of birth: 6 May 1990 (age 36)
- Place of birth: Martins, Brazil
- Height: 1.83 m (6 ft 0 in)
- Position: Forward

Team information
- Current team: Treze

Youth career
- 2008–2009: Atlético Paranaense

Senior career*
Years	Team	Apps	(Gls)
2010–2014	ABC	8	(0)
2011	→ Santa Cruz-AL (loan)	0	(0)
2013	→ Santa Cruz-RN (loan)	2	(1)
2013	→ Vila Nova (loan)	0	(0)
2013	→ Santa Cruz-AL (loan)	0	(0)
2014	→ São Luiz (loan)	10	(1)
2014	→ Alecrim (loan)	0	(0)
2015	Campinense	20	(11)
2015	Boa Esporte	13	(4)
2016	Joinville	15	(3)
2016	Tombense	11	(3)
2017	Paraná	34	(6)
2018	→ Montedio Yamagata (loan)	22	(7)
2019	Novorizontino	5	(1)
2019	Botafogo-PB	13	(7)
2019	Operário Ferroviário	6	(0)
2020	Cuiabá	5	(3)
2020	ABC	8	(1)
2020–	Treze	3	(1)
- * Club domestic league appearances and goals as of 20:57, 8 December 2020 (UTC)

Felipe Alves de Lima (born 6 May 1990) is a Brazilian footballer who plays as a forward for Treze.
