= Bruno Moraes (footballer, born 1989) =

Brazilian footballer

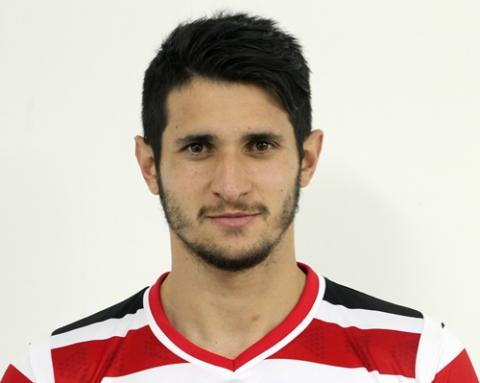

Personal information
- Full name: Bruno Eduardo de Moraes
- Date of birth: 12 January 1989 (age 37)
- Place of birth: Bragança Paulista, Brazil
- Height: 1.84 m (6 ft 1/2 in)
- Position: Forward

Team information
- Current team: Figueirense
- Number: 9

Youth career
- –2009: Santo André

Senior career*
Years	Team	Apps	(Gls)
2009–2011	Santo André	8	(1)
2011	Porto Alegre	11	(1)
2011–2012	Bragantino	0	(0)
2012	→ Ferroviário (CE) (loan)	0	(0)
2013	Taubaté	0	(0)
2013	Portuguesa	7	(2)
2014	Red Bull Brasil	0	(0)
2015	Ferroviária	0	(0)
2015–2017	Santa Cruz	36	(12)
2017	Dibba	12	(6)
2017–2019	Botafogo-SP	35	(9)
2018	→ Coritiba (loan)	20	(2)
2020	São Caetano	5	(4)
2020–2021	Dibba Al Fujairah	12	(6)
2021	Santa Cruz	5	(0)
2022	Pouso Alegre	9	(2)
2022	Rio Claro	4	(1)
2022	Inter de Limeira	8	(2)
2023	Juventus-SP	15	(12)
2023–	Figueirense	10	(1)
- * Club domestic league appearances and goals as of 26 August 2023

Bruno Eduardo de Moraes (born 12 January 1989), also known as Bruno Moraes, is a Brazilian footballer who plays as a forward for Figueirense.

== Career ==
Born in Bragança Paulista, Moraes began his career on Santo André, and after being deemed surplus to requirements, signed with Porto Alegre. Soon after, he returned to his native state, joining Bragantino. However, after failing to appear with Braga, he was loaned to Ferroviário in March 2012.

In 2013 Moraes signed with Taubaté, and after being the club's topscorer, he signed a contract with Série A outfit Portuguesa on 5 July. He made his top flight debut on the 13th, scoring in a 1–4 defeat to Santos.

Moraes was released by Lusa in December, after the club's relegation. He subsequently represented Red Bull Brasil and Ferroviária before joining Santa Cruz.

On 4 December 2017, after a stint at Dibba, Moraes joined Botafogo-SP.

== Honours ==
=== Individual ===
- Campeonato Paulista Countryside player of the year: 2018
