= Daniel Costa (Brazilian footballer) =

Brazilian footballer (born 1988)

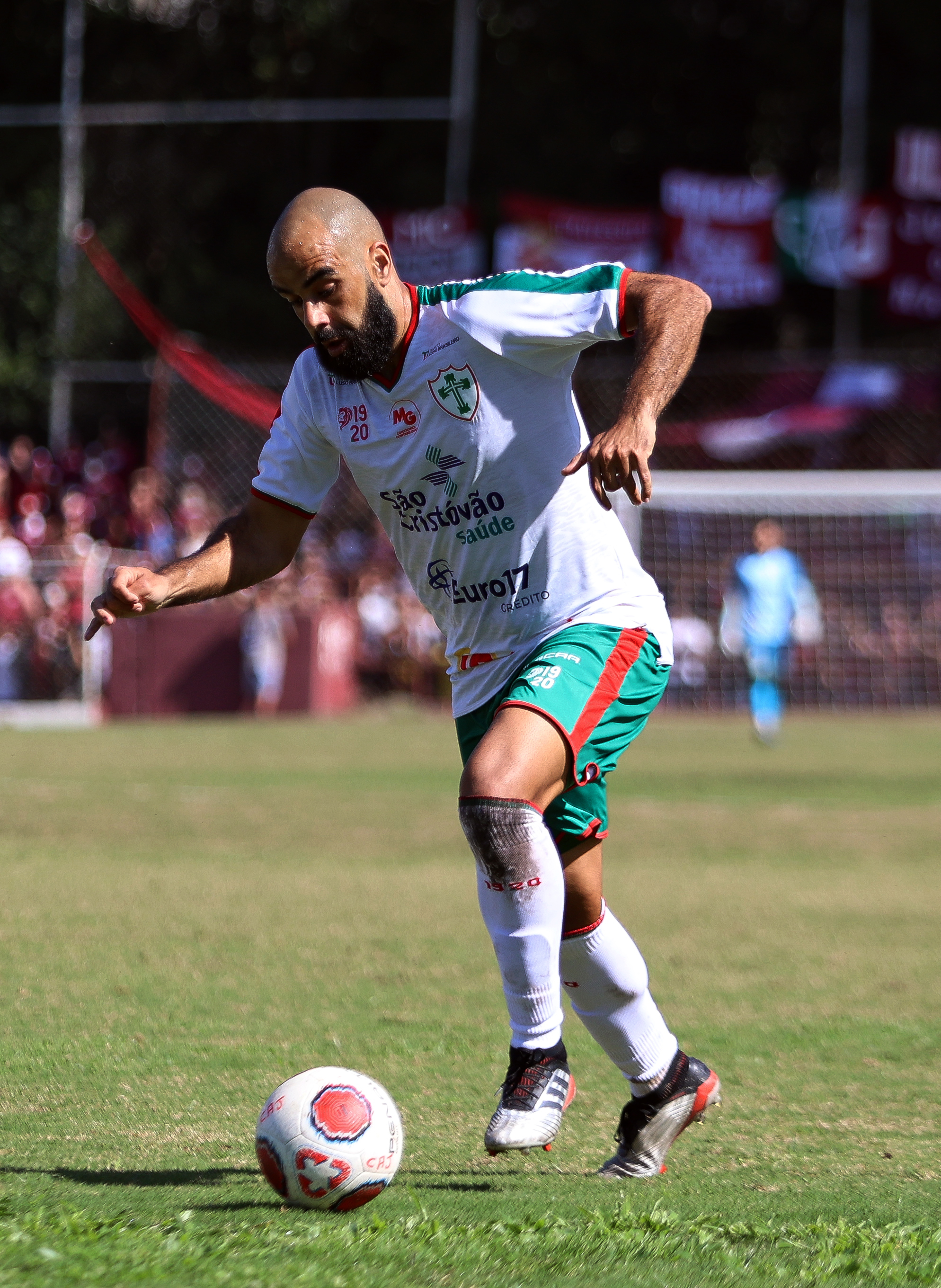
- Daniel Costa with Portuguesa in 2019

Personal information
- Full name: Maikel Daniel Costa
- Date of birth: 5 April 1988 (age 38)
- Place of birth: Piracicaba, Brazil
- Height: 1.83 m (6 ft 0 in)
- Position: Attacking midfielder

Team information
- Current team: Goiatuba

Youth career
- XV de Piracicaba

Senior career*
Years	Team	Apps	(Gls)
2008	Ituano	2	(0)
2008	América-SP	3	(0)
2009	Botafogo-SP	0	(0)
2009	Taquaritinga	10	(0)
2010	Ponte Preta	8	(0)
2010	Botafogo-SP	5	(1)
2011	Catanduvense	20	(4)
2011–2012	Comercial-SP	3	(0)
2012	América-SP	7	(0)
2012	Rio Branco-SP	0	(0)
2013	Treze	33	(10)
2014	CSA	10	(3)
2014–2015	América de Natal	39	(10)
2015–2016	Santa Cruz	29	(7)
2016	Bandırmaspor	14	(3)
2017–2018	CSA	79	(14)
2019	Criciúma	49	(8)
2020	XV de Piracicaba	18	(5)
2020	Manaus	6	(1)
2021	São Bento	12	(0)
2021	Sampaio Corrêa	13	(2)
2021	Manaus	9	(0)
2022–2023	Portuguesa	45	(7)
2023	Betim Futebol	19	(5)
2023	Mixto	7	(4)
2024	Xv de Piracicaba	0	(0)
2025	Gama	10	(0)
2025	Itabirito	3	(0)
2025–	Goiatuba	20	(3)
- * Club domestic league appearances and goals as of 19 November 2026

Maikel Daniel Costa (born 5 April 1988), known as Daniel Costa, is a Brazilian footballer who plays as an attacking midfielder for Goiatuba.

== Career ==
Born in Piracicaba, São Paulo, Daniel Costa was a youth product of hometown side XV de Piracicaba. In 2008, he played for Ituano and América-SP.

After representing Botafogo-SP and Taquaritinga during the 2009, Daniel Costa moved to Ponte Preta ahead of the 2010 campaign. After featuring sparingly, he returned to Botafogo for the Série D.

After playing for Catanduvense, Comercial-SP, América and Rio Branco-SP, all in his native state, Daniel Costa agreed to join Treze in December 2012. He scored ten goals in the 2013 Campeonato Paraibano, but his side finished second.

In November 2013, Daniel Costa moved to CSA. A regular starter, he signed for América de Natal the following 26 March, as a request of manager Oliveira Canindé.

Daniel Costa left América on 20 May 2015, and joined Santa Cruz the following day. On 23 December, after scoring seven goals as the club achieved promotion to the Série A, he renewed his contract.

Daniel Costa made his top tier debut on 13 June 2016, coming on as a second-half substitute for Fernando Gabriel in a 2–0 home loss against Santos. He left Santa in July, and moved to Turkish side Bandırmaspor shortly after.

Daniel Costa returned to his home country and CSA on 7 February 2017, and was a first-choice as the club achieved two consecutive promotions. On 17 December 2018, however, he moved to Criciúma.

On 8 January 2020, Daniel Costa was announced as the new signing of XV de Piracicaba, his first club. He joined Manaus in the third division on 3 October, but returned to his native state the following 4 January, after agreeing to a deal with São Bento.

On 26 May 2021, Daniel Costa joined Sampaio Corrêa in the second level. He returned to Manaus on 8 September, but moved to Portuguesa on 14 December.

== Career statistics ==
As of 17 March 2023

Appearances and goals by club, season and competition
Club	Season	League			State League		Cup		Continental		Other		Total	
Club	Season	Division	Apps	Goals	Apps	Goals	Apps	Goals	Apps	Goals	Apps	Goals	Apps	Goals
Ituano	2008	Paulista	—		2	0	—		—		—		2	0
América-SP	2009	Paulista A2	—		3	0	—		—		—		3	0
Taquaritinga	2009	Paulista A2	—		10	0	—		—		—		10	0
Ponte Preta	2010	Série B	0	0	8	0	1	0	—		—		9	0
Botafogo-SP	2010	Série D	0	0	—		—		—		—		0	0
Catanduvense	2011	Paulista A2	—		20	4	—		—		—		20	4
Comercial-SP	2011	Paulista A2	—		0	0	—		—		18 (Note: Appearance(s) in Copa Paulista)	2	18	2
Comercial-SP	2012	Paulista	—		3	0	—		—		—		3	0
Comercial-SP	Total		—		3	0	—		—		18	2	21	2
América-SP	2012	Paulista A2	—		7	0	—		—		—		7	0
Rio Branco-SP	2012	Paulista A3	—		0	0	—		—		10	2	10	2
Treze	2013	Série C	3	0	30	10	—		—		—		33	10
CSA	2014	Alagoano	—		10	3	2	0	—		8 (Note: Appearance(s) in Copa do Nordeste)	3	20	6
América-RN	2014	Série B	24	5	—		—		—		—		24	5
América-RN	2015	Série B	0	0	15	5	1	0	—		6	1	22	6
América-RN	Total		24	5	15	5	1	0	—		6	1	46	11
Santa Cruz	2015	Série B	19	7	—		—		—		—		19	7
Santa Cruz	2016	Série A	4	0	6	0	3	0	—		4	0	17	0
Santa Cruz	Total		23	7	6	0	3	0	—		4	0	36	7
Bandırmaspor	2016–17	TFF First League	14	3	—		2	1	—		—		16	4
CSA	2017	Série C	21	2	15	3	—		—		4	0	40	5
CSA	2018	Série B	33	5	10	4	2	0	—		5	2	50	11
CSA	Total		54	7	25	7	2	0	—		9	2	90	16
Criciúma	2019	Série B	31	3	18	5	4	1	—		—		53	9
XV de Piracicaba	2020	Paulista A2	—		18	5	2	1	—		—		20	6
Manaus	2020	Série C	6	1	—		—		—		—		6	1
São Bento	2021	Série D	0	0	12	0	—		—		—		12	0
Sampaio Corrêa	2021	Série B	13	2	—		—		—		—		13	2
Manaus	2021	Série C	9	0	—		—		—		3 (Note: Appearance(s) in Copa Verde)	0	12	0
Portuguesa	2022	Paulista A2	—		20	4	—		—		14	2	34	6
Portuguesa	2023	Paulista	—		11	1	—		—		—		11	1
Portuguesa	Total		—		31	5	—		—		14	2	45	7
Career total			177	28	218	44	17	3	0	0	72	12	484	87

== Honours ==
América de Natal

- Campeonato Potiguar: 2015

Santa Cruz

- Campeonato Pernambucano: 2016
- Copa do Nordeste: 2016

CSA

- Campeonato Brasileiro Série C: 2017
- Campeonato Alagoano: 2018

Portuguesa

- Campeonato Paulista Série A2: 2022

Individual

- Campeonato Paulista Série A2 Best XI: 2022
