= List of football clubs in São Paulo (state) =

Article that aims to contemplate active clubs and other great clubs that played in football in the state of São Paulo, the oldest in Brazil, played since 1902.

== Filiated at FPF ==
As of 2025

Source: Federação Paulista de Futebol

Club	Full name	Founded	Location	Stadium	Colors
São Paulo
Corinthians	Sport Club Corinthians Paulista	1 September 1910; 115 years ago	Itaquera, São Paulo	Neo Química Arena	white, black
Palmeiras	Sociedade Esportiva Palmeiras (Note: Due to the World War II and the fact of Brazil integrating the allied forces, Societá Sportiva Palestra Itália changed their name to the currently SE Palmeiras.)	26 August 1914; 111 years ago	Perdizes, São Paulo	Allianz Parque	green, white
Portuguesa	Associação Portuguesa de Desportos	14 August 1920; 105 years ago	Pari, São Paulo	Canindé	green, red
São Paulo	São Paulo Futebol Clube	25 January 1930; 96 years ago (Note: Due to financial problems, São Paulo FC ceased its activities in May 1935, returning on December 16 of the same year.)	Morumbi, São Paulo	Morumbi	red, white, black
Juventus	Clube Atlético Juventus (Note: Founded as Cotonifício Rodolfo Crespi Futebol Clube, a name that remained until 1929. Played in the 1934 FPF championship where it was crowned champion as Clube Atlético Fiorentino.)	20 April 1924; 101 years ago	Mooca, São Paulo	Rua Javari	burgundy, white
Nacional	Nacional Atlético Clube (Note: Founded as São Paulo Railway Athletic Club, a name kept until 1946 when the trains company closed.)	16 February 1919; 107 years ago	Barra Funda, São Paulo	Nicolau Alayon	blue, white, red
Barcelona	Barcelona Esportivo Capela	20 January 2004; 22 years ago	Socorro, São Paulo	None (Note: Their field, the "Socorrão", is not eligible for professional matches.)	blue, red
Coast of São Paulo
Jabaquara	Jabaquara Atlético Clube (Note: Founded as Hespanha Football Club, a name it kept until December 1942.)	15 November 1914; 111 years ago	Santos	Espanha	yellow, red
Portuguesa Santista	Associação Atlética Portuguesa	20 November 1917; 108 years ago	Santos	Ulrico Mursa	green, red
Santos	Santos Futebol Clube	14 April 1912; 113 years ago	Santos	Vila Belmiro	white, black
Guarujá (Note: Inactive since 2019.)	Associação Desportiva Guarujá	2 December 1992; 33 years ago	Guarujá	Antônio Fernandes	light blue, white
São Vicente (Note: Inactive since 2015.)	São Vicente Atlético Clube	21 April 1928; 97 years ago	São Vicente	Mansuelo Pierotti	white, black
Greater São Paulo
AD Guarulhos	Associação Desportiva Guarulhos (Note: Founded as Associação Desportiva Vila das Palmeiras, a name it kept until 1993.)	1 February 1969; 57 years ago	Guarulhos	Antônio Soares	blue, white
Água Santa	Esporte Clube Água Santa	27 October 1981; 44 years ago	Diadema	Distrital do Inamar	white, blue
Atlético Mogi	Clube Atlético Mogi das Cruzes de Futebol Ltda.	19 April 2004; 21 years ago	Mogi das Cruzes	Francisco Nogueira	blue, white
Audax	Grêmio Osasco Audax Esporte Clube (Note: Founded as Pão de Açúcar Esporte Clube in the city of São Paulo, it changed its name to Audax Esporte Clube in 2012 with the sale of the Pão de Açúcar group to Groupe Casino. In 2014 the club was sold again, to the same owner of Grêmio Esportivo Osasco (Mário Teixeira), being relocated to the same city and renamed Grêmio Osasco Audax.)	8 December 1985; 40 years ago	Osasco	José Liberatti	red, white
CAD Ribeirão Pires (Note: Inactive since 2018.)	Clube Atlético Desportivo Ribeirão Pires (Note: Founded as Clube Atlético Diadema in the city of Diadema, changed its name to CAD Ribeirão Pires and moved to Ribeirão Pires in February 2020.)	9 October 2009; 16 years ago	Ribeirão Pires	Valentino Redivo	white, blue
Colorado	Colorado Caieiras Futebol Clube	18 September 2019; 6 years ago	Caieiras	Carlos Ferracini	red, white
EC São Bernardo	Esporte Clube São Bernardo (Note: Incorporated Aliança Clube, also from São Bernardo do Campo, in 1982.)	3 February 1928; 98 years ago	São Bernardo do Campo	Baetão	black, white
ECO (Note: Away from professional football since 2008, the club still competes in youth categories.)	Esporte Clube Osasco	21 December 1984; 41 years ago	Osasco	José Liberatti	blue, white
ECUS	Esporte Clube União Suzano	25 August 1993; 32 years ago	Suzano	Francisco Marques	blue, white, red
Flamengo	Associação Atlética Flamengo	1 June 1954; 71 years ago	Guarulhos	Antônio Soares	red, black
Força (Note: Inactive since 2011.)	Força Esporte Clube	16 May 2001; 24 years ago	Caieiras	Carlos Ferracini	orange, black
Grêmio Barueri (Note: Inactive since 2017.)	Grêmio Recreativo Barueri (Note: Changed its name to Grêmio Prudente and began playing in the city of Presidente Prudente in 2010, however, returned to Barueri at the end of 2011.)	25 March 1989; 36 years ago	Barueri	Arena Barueri	red, yellow, blue
Grêmio Osasco (Note: Away from professional football since 2021, the club still competes in youth categories.)	Grêmio Esportivo Osasco	27 December 2007; 18 years ago	Osasco	José Liberatti	red, white, green
Mauá	Mauá Futebol Clube	23 October 2017; 8 years ago	Mauá	Pedro Benedetti	yellow, black
Mauaense	Grêmio Esportivo Mauaense	15 December 1981; 44 years ago	Mauá	Pedro Benedetti	blue, white
Oeste	Oeste Futebol Clube	25 January 1921; 105 years ago	Barueri (Note: Oeste has moved from Itápolis to Barueri in 2017.)	Arena Barueri	red, black
Palestra (Note: Inactive since 2012.)	Palestra São Bernardo	1 September 1935; 90 years ago	São Bernardo do Campo	Baetão	green, white (Note: Started playing using red and white in the late 2000s, but due to rejection from the fans, returned to green and white.)
Santo André	Esporte Clube Santo André	18 September 1967; 58 years ago	Santo André	Bruno José Daniel	white, blue
São Bernardo FC	São Bernardo Futebol Clube	20 December 2004; 21 years ago	São Bernardo do Campo	1º de Maio	yellow, black
São Caetano	São Caetano Futebol (Note: Changed its name from Associação Desportiva São Caetano to São Caetano Futebol in 2025.)	20 December 1989; 36 years ago	São Caetano do Sul	Anacleto Campanella	blue, white
Sport Barueri (Note: Inactive since 2013.)	Sport Club Barueri (Note: Founded as Campinas Futebol Clube in the city of Campinas, changed its name to Sport Club Barueri and moved to Barueri in 9 October 2009.)	1 January 1998; 28 years ago	Barueri	Arena Barueri	blue, white
Taboão da Serra	Clube Atlético Taboão da Serra	12 December 1985; 40 years ago	Taboão da Serra	José Feres	red, black
União Mogi	União Futebol Clube	7 September 1913; 112 years ago	Mogi das Cruzes	Francisco Nogueira	red, white
União Suzano	União Suzano Atlético Clube (Note: Founded as Clube Atlético Paulista, a name it kept until 1989.)	25 January 1969; 57 years ago	Suzano	Francisco Marques	blue, white, red
Campinas metropolitan area
Guarani	Guarani Futebol Clube	2 April 1911; 114 years ago	Campinas	Brinco de Ouro	green, white
Ponte Preta	Associação Atlética Ponte Preta	11 August 1900; 125 years ago	Campinas	Moisés Lucarelli	white, black
Jaguariúna	Jaguariúna Futebol Clube (Note: Founded as Esporte Clube São Judas Tadeu and merged with the Associação Desportiva Jaguariúna in 2017.)	29 March 2007; 18 years ago	Jaguariúna	Alfredo Chiavegato	navy blue, yellow, white
Nova Odessa (Note: Affiliated since 2013, the club has never competed in professional competitions.)	Nova Odessa Atlético Clube	16 October 1996; 29 years ago	Nova Odessa	Natal Gazzeta	blue, white
Paulínia (Note: Away from professional football since 2015, the club still competes in youth categories.)	Paulínia Futebol Clube	10 June 2004; 21 years ago	Paulínia	Luís Perissinotto	blue, yellow
Primavera	Esporte Clube Primavera	27 January 1927; 99 years ago	Indaiatuba	Ítalo Limongi	red, white, black
Rio Branco	Rio Branco Esporte Clube	4 August 1913; 112 years ago	Americana	Décio Vitta	white, black
SEV (Note: Inactive since 2015.)	Social Esportiva Vitória (Note: Founded as Sociedade Esportiva Votuporanguense in the city of Votuporanga, changed its name to Social Esportiva Vitória and moved to Hortolândia in 2006.)	10 May 2001; 24 years ago	Hortolândia	Tico Breda	yellow, white, blue
Sumaré (Note: Inactive since 2015.)	Sumaré Atlético Clube	9 December 2005; 20 years ago	Sumaré	José Pereira	blue, yellow
União Barbarense	União Agrícola Barbarense Futebol Clube	22 November 1914; 111 years ago	Santa Bárbara d'Oeste	Antônio Ribeiro Guimarães	black, white
Ribeirão Preto area
Barretos	Barretos Esporte Clube	28 October 1960; 65 years ago	Barretos	Fortaleza	red, green
Batatais	Batatais Futebol Clube	18 September 1919; 106 years ago	Batatais	Osvaldo Scatena	red, white
Botafogo	Botafogo Futebol Clube	12 October 1918; 107 years ago	Ribeirão Preto	Santa Cruz	red, white, black
Comercial	Comercial Futebol Clube	10 October 1911; 114 years ago	Ribeirão Preto	Palma Travassos	white, black
Francana	Associação Atlética Francana	12 October 1912; 113 years ago	Franca	José Lancha Filho	green, white
Guariba (Note: Inactive since 2015.)	Guariba Esporte Clube (Note: Founded as Juventus Esporte Clube, a name it kept until 1980.)	1 March 1971; 54 years ago	Guariba	Domingos Baldan	blue, white
Inter de Bebedouro	Associação Atlética Internacional	11 June 1906; 119 years ago	Bebedouro	Sócrates Stamatto	red, white
Jaboticabal	Jaboticabal Atlético	30 April 1911; 114 years ago	Jaboticabal	None (Note: The club had its home stadium, Robert Todd Locke, seized due to debts in 2009, and since then, not competed anymore.)	white, black
Monte Azul	Atlético Monte Azul	28 April 1920; 105 years ago	Monte Azul Paulista	Otacília Arroyo	blue, white
Olé Brasil (Note: Away from professional football since 2016, the club still competes in youth categories.)	Olé Brasil Futebol Clube	21 September 2006; 19 years ago	Ribeirão Preto	None	yellow, black
Sertãozinho	Sertãozinho Futebol Clube	6 August 1944; 81 years ago	Sertãozinho	Frederico Dalmaso	burgundy, white
Taquaritinga	Clube Atlético Taquaritinga	17 March 1942; 83 years ago	Taquaritinga	Taquarão	red, black, green
São José do Rio Preto area
América	América Futebol Clube	28 January 1946; 80 years ago	São José do Rio Preto	Teixeirão	red, white
Catanduva	Catanduva Futebol Clube	14 November 2017; 8 years ago	Catanduva	Silvio Salles	navy blue, yellow, white
Fernandópolis	Fernandópolis Futebol Clube (Note: Founded as Associação Bancária de Esportes, a name it kept until 1966.)	15 November 1961; 64 years ago	Fernandópolis	Cláudio Rodante	blue, yellow, white
Grêmio Catanduvense (Note: Away from professional football since 2020, the club still competes in youth categories.)	Grêmio Catanduvense de Futebol	16 April 2004; 21 years ago	Catanduva	Silvio Salles	light blue, white
José Bonifácio (Note: Away from professional football since 2020, the club still competes in youth categories.)	José Bonifácio Esporte Clube	1 February 1961; 65 years ago	José Bonifácio	Antônio Pereira Braga	red, white, black
Mirassol	Mirassol Futebol Clube	9 November 1925; 100 years ago	Mirassol	José Maria de Campos Maia	yellow, green, white
Novorizontino	Grêmio Novorizontino (Note: Shares the same colors and crest as the Grêmio Esportivo Novorizontino, but by statute it is a separate club.)	1 March 2010; 15 years ago	Novo Horizonte	Jorge Ismael de Biasi	yellow, black
Olímpia	Olímpia Futebol Clube	5 December 1946; 79 years ago	Olímpia	Tereza Breda	blue, white
Rio Preto	Rio Preto Esporte Clube	21 April 1919; 106 years ago	São José do Rio Preto	Anísio Haddad	green, white
Tanabi	Tanabi Esporte Clube	18 December 1942; 83 years ago	Tanabi	Alberto Victolo	green, white
Votuporanguense	Clube Atlético Votuporanguense	11 December 2009; 16 years ago	Votuporanga	Plínio Marin	black, white
Sorocaba area
Atlético Sorocaba (Note: Inactive since 2017.)	Clube Atlético Sorocaba	21 February 1991; 34 years ago	Sorocaba	CIC Walter Ribeiro	yellow, red
Desportivo Brasil	Desportivo Brasil Participações Ltda.	19 November 2005; 20 years ago	Porto Feliz	Ernesto Rocco	red, white
Ituano	Ituano Futebol Clube (Note: Previous named Associação Atlética Sorocabana (1947–1960s) and Ferroviário Atlético Ituano (1960s–1989).)	24 May 1947; 78 years ago	Itu	Novelli Júnior	red, black
Paulista	Paulista Futebol Clube (Note: During a partnership with the food brand Etti, Paulista FC played in some championships under the name "Etti Jundiaí".)	17 May 1909; 116 years ago	Jundiaí	Jayme Cintra	red, white, black
Paulistano (Note: Inactive since 2014.)	Clube Atlético Paulistano	28 November 1950; 75 years ago	São Roque	Quintino de Lima	red, white, black
Saltense (Note: Inactive since 2009.)	Associação Atlética Saltense	29 March 1936; 89 years ago	Salto	Amadeu Mosca	blue, white, red
São Bento	Esporte Clube São Bento	14 September 1913; 112 years ago	Sorocaba	CIC Walter Ribeiro	blue, white
Votoraty	Votoraty Futebol Clube	12 May 2005; 20 years ago	Votorantim	Domênico Mettidieri	blue, burgundy, white
Bauru area
Flamengo (Note: Inactive since 2009.)	Flamengo Futebol Clube	26 April 1972; 53 years ago	Pirajuí	Francisco Nazareth	red, black
Linense	Clube Atlético Linense	12 June 1927; 98 years ago	Lins	Gilberto Siqueira Lopes	red, white
Lençoense	Clube Atlético Lençoense (Note: Changed its name to CAL Bariri and began playing in the city of Bariri in 2009, however, returned to Lençóis Paulista in 2024.)	16 December 1943; 82 years ago	Lençóis Paulista	Archangelo Brega	white, black
Marília	Marília Atlético Clube (Note: Founded as Esporte Clube Comercial, a name it kept until 11 July 1947.)	12 April 1942; 83 years ago	Marília	Bento de Abreu	light blue, white
Noroeste	Esporte Clube Noroeste	1 September 1910; 115 years ago	Bauru	Alfredo de Castilho	red, white
Talentos 10	Talentos 10 Atlético Clube	13 October 2017; 8 years ago	Marília	Bento de Abreu	yellow, blue, white
Tupã	Tupã Futebol Clube	8 February 1936; 90 years ago	Tupã	Alonso Braga	red, white, black
XV de Jaú	Esporte Clube XV de Novembro	15 November 1924; 101 years ago	Jaú	Zezinho Magalhães	green, yellow
Araraquara area
Ferroviária	Associação Ferroviária de Esportes	12 April 1950; 75 years ago	Araraquara	Fonte Luminosa	burgundy, white
Matonense	Sociedade Esportiva Matonense	24 May 1976; 49 years ago	Matão	Hudson Buck Ferreira	blue, white
São Carlos	São Carlos Futebol Clube	25 November 2004; 21 years ago	São Carlos	Luisão	blue, yellow
São-Carlense	Grêmio Desportivo São-Carlense (Note: Direct continuation of the Grêmio Esportivo Sãocarlense.)	20 July 2016; 9 years ago	São Carlos	Luisão	blue, white, red
Piracicaba area
Capivariano	Capivariano Futebol Clube	12 December 1918; 107 years ago	Capivari	Arena Capivari	red, white
Comercial (Note: Away from professional football since 2013, the club still competes in youth categories.)	Comercial Futebol Clube	2 June 1920; 105 years ago	Tietê	Ferreirão	white, black
Independente	Independente Futebol Clube	19 January 1944; 82 years ago	Limeira	Agostinho Prada	white, black
Inter de Limeira	Associação Atlética Internacional	5 October 1913; 112 years ago	Limeira	Major José Levy Sobrinho	white, black
CA Lemense (Note: Inactive since 2017.)	Clube Atlético Lemense	4 October 2005; 20 years ago	Leme	Bruno Lazzarini	blue, white
Lemense FC	Lemense Futebol Clube (Note: Founded as Sport Club Atibaia in the city of Atibaia, changed its name to Lemense FC and moved to Leme in 2022.)	12 December 2005; 20 years ago	Leme	Bruno Lazzarini	blue, white
Rio Claro	Rio Claro Futebol Clube	9 May 1909; 116 years ago	Rio Claro	Augusto Schimidt	blue, white
União São João	União São João Esporte Clube	14 January 1981; 45 years ago	Araras	Hermínio Ometto	white, green
Velo Clube	Associação Esportiva Velo Clube Rioclarense	28 August 1910; 115 years ago	Rio Claro	Benito Agnelo	red, green
XV de Piracicaba	Esporte Clube XV de Novembro	15 November 1913; 112 years ago	Piracicaba	Barão da Serra Negra	black, white
Paraíba Valley
Jacareí (Note: Inactive since 2015.)	Jacareí Atlético Clube	27 October 1980; 45 years ago	Jacareí	Stravos Papadopoulos	red, white, black
Joseense	Clube Atlético Joseense (Note: Changed its name to São José dos Campos Futebol Clube from 2014 to 2017.)	1 October 1998; 27 years ago	São José dos Campos	Martins Pereira	yellow, black
Manthiqueira	Academia Desportiva Manthiqueira Futebol	4 August 2005; 20 years ago	Guaratinguetá	Dario Rodrigues Leite	orange, black
Pirassununguense (Note: Inactive since 2015.)	Clube Atlético Pirassununguense	7 September 1907; 118 years ago	Pirassununga	Belarmino Del Nero	black, white
Primeira Camisa (Note: Inactive since 2012.)	Futebol Clube Primeira Camisa	20 May 2005; 20 years ago	São José dos Campos	ADC Parahyba	white, red, blue
São José	São José Esporte Clube	13 August 1933; 92 years ago	São José dos Campos	Martins Pereira	blue, yellow
Taubaté	Esporte Clube Taubaté	1 November 1914; 111 years ago	Taubaté	Joaquinzão	blue, white
XV de Caraguatatuba (Note: Inactive since 2006.)	Esporte Clube XV de Novembro	18 February 1934; 91 years ago	Caraguatatuba	XV de Novembro	white, green
Mid-west area
Amparo	Amparo Athlético Club	28 April 1919; 106 years ago	Amparo	José de Araújo Cintra	black, white
Brasilis	Brasilis Futebol Clube	1 January 2007; 19 years ago	Águas de Lindoia	Leonardo Barbieri	orange, green
Guaçuano (Note: Away from professional football since 2015, the club still competes in youth categories.)	Clube Atlético Guaçuano	26 February 1929; 96 years ago	Mogi Guaçu	Alexandre Camacho	green, white
Itapirense	Sociedade Esportiva Itapirense	24 March 1947; 78 years ago	Itapira	Chico Vieira	red, white
Mogi Mirim (Note: Inactive since 2024.)	Mogi Mirim Esporte Clube	1 February 1932; 94 years ago	Mogi Mirim	Vail Chaves	red, white
Palmeiras (Note: Inactive since 1999.)	Palmeiras Futebol Clube	12 January 1924; 102 years ago	São João da Boa Vista	Getúlio Vargas Filho	white, black
Pinhalense (Note: Inactive since 2007.)	Ginásio Pinhalense de Esportes Atléticos	17 July 1937; 88 years ago	Espírito Santo do Pinhal	Fernando Costa	red, white
Radium (Note: Inactive since 2014.)	Radium Futebol Clube	1 May 1919; 106 years ago	Mococa	São Sebastião	green, white
Red Bull Bragantino	Red Bull Bragantino (Note: Due to the partnership between Red Bull and Clube Atlético Bragantino firmed in 2019, the club changed their name, crest and colors.)	8 January 1928; 98 years ago	Bragança Paulista	Nabi Abi Chedid	red, white, blue
União Tambaú (Note: Inactive since 1989.)	Esporte Clube União	25 September 1910; 115 years ago	Tambaú	João Meirelles	blue, red
Presidente Prudente area
Grêmio Prudente	Grêmio Desportivo Prudente (Note: Founded as Oeste Paulista Esporte Clube, a name it kept until 2012.)	13 December 2005; 20 years ago	Presidente Prudente	Prudentão	blue, red, white
Osvaldo Cruz	Osvaldo Cruz Futebol Clube	17 February 2004; 21 years ago	Osvaldo Cruz	Breno do Val	blue, white
Presidente Prudente (Note: Inactive since 2017.)	Presidente Prudente Futebol Clube	9 April 1989; 36 years ago	Presidente Prudente	Caetano Peretti	green, black, white
Ranchariense (Note: Inactive since 2009.)	Associação Atlética Ranchariense	20 January 1943; 83 years ago	Rancharia	Francisco Franco	blue, white
Araçatuba area
Andradina	Andradina Esporte Clube (Note: Founded as Atlético Esportivo Araçatuba, a name it kept until 2016. In 2018 the club returns as Andradina Esporte Clube in the city of Andradina.)	5 October 2002; 23 years ago	Andradina	Evandro Brembatti	blue, white
Araçatuba	Associação Esportiva Araçatuba	15 December 1972; 53 years ago	Araçatuba	Adhemar de Barros	yellow, blue
Bandeirante	Bandeirante Esporte Clube	11 March 1923; 102 years ago	Birigui	Pedro Berbel	red, white, black
Ilha Solteira (Note: Inactive since 2014.)	Associação Esportiva Ilha Solteira	1 December 1993; 32 years ago	Ilha Solteira	Frei Arnaldo	blue, white
Penapolense	Clube Atlético Penapolense	16 November 1944; 81 years ago	Penápolis	Tenente Carriço	red, white, blue
South area
Assisense	Clube Atlético Assisense	27 March 1995; 30 years ago	Assis	Antônio Viana	white, blue
Comercial (Note: Inactive since 2009.)	Comercial Esporte Clube	10 March 1978; 47 years ago	Registro	Alberto Bertelli	red, white
Elosport (Note: Away from professional football since 2021, the club still competes in youth categories.)	Elosport Capão Bonito	5 October 1993; 32 years ago	Capão Bonito	José Sidney da Cunha	blue, green
Itapetininga (Note: Inactive since 2004.)	Esporte Clube Itapetininga	25 April 1995; 30 years ago	Itapetininga	Péricles D'Ávila	blue, yellow
Itararé	Associação Atlética Itararé	20 October 1950; 75 years ago	Itararé	Vergínio Holtz	blue, white
Santacruzense	Associação Esportiva Santacruzense	25 January 1931; 95 years ago	Santa Cruz do Rio Pardo	Leônidas Camarinha	red, white, black
VOCEM	Vila Operária Clube Esporte Mariano	21 July 1954; 71 years ago	Assis	Antônio Viana	burgundy, white
Not established
Ska Brasil	Futebol Clube Ska Brasil (Note: Founded as Monte Negro Esporte Clube, a name kept until 1992. In 2020 the club liquidated its structure and sold the FPF membership to FC Ska Brasil.) (Note: After a disagreement with the municipal authorities of Santana de Parnaíba, the club announced the suspension of its activities until it relocates to a new municipality.)	13 June 2019; 6 years ago	—N/a	—N/a	orange, blue

== Filiated at FPF only at the youth level ==
Special license created in 2018 for clubs that will only compete in youth competitions (U20, U17, U15, etc.)

Club	Full name	Founded	Location	Stadium	Colors
Aguaí	Sport Clube Aguaí Entretenimento Ltda.	26 August 2021; 4 years ago	Aguaí	Leonardo Guaranha	green, yellow
Araçatuba FC	Araçatuba Futebol Clube	5 July 2021; 4 years ago	Araçatuba	Adhemar de Barros	orange, white, black
Aster Itaquá	Aster Brasil Itaquaquecetuba Sport Club	27 March 2023; 2 years ago	Itaquaquecetuba	Ildeu do Carmo	blue, black
Atlético Guaratinguetá	Atlético Guaratinguetá SAF	8 November 2021; 4 years ago	Guaratinguetá	Dario Rodrigues Leite	red, white
Bandeirante	Clube Atlético Bandeirante	16 August 1933; 92 years ago	Brodowski	Mário Lima Santos	red, white
Centro Olímpico (Note: Initially a women's football club, it also began competing in the youth men's categories.)	Associação Desportiva Centro Olímpico	3 February 1976; 50 years ago	Moema, São Paulo	Adhemar Ferreira da Silva	red, white, black
Clube Vital	Clube Vital Academia de Futebol SAF	7 June 2022; 3 years ago	Ibiúna	Marcos Eduardo Camargo	purple, black, golden
Cosmopolitano	Cosmopolitano Futebol Clube	15 February 2023; 3 years ago	Cosmópolis	Thelmo de Almeida	green, white
DS Sports	Different System Sports Ltda.	18 October 2022; 3 years ago	Atibaia	Salvador Russani	red, black
El Shaday	El Shaday Futebol Clube Ltda.	27 April 2023; 2 years ago	Aricanduva, São Paulo	CDC União do Morro	red, white, blue
I9	I9 International Academy	9 August 2019; 6 years ago	Ribeirão Preto	Alcans Park	black, yellow
Ibrachina	Ibrachina Futebol Clube	19 September 2020; 5 years ago	Mooca, São Paulo	Arena Ibrachina	red, white
Itaquaquecetuba	Itaquaquecetuba Athletico Club	21 February 2025; 11 months ago	Itaquaquecetuba	Ildeu do Carmo	red, white, black
Meia Noite	Esporte Clube Meia Noite	21 April 1959; 66 years ago	Patrocínio Paulista	Galileu de Andrade	white, black
Metropolitano	Metropolitano SAF	10 January 2018; 8 years ago	Campo Limpo Paulista	Aldévio Barbosa	red, white
Pinda	Pinda Futebol Clube Ltda.	22 February 2022; 3 years ago	Pindamonhangaba	Zito Miranda	green, white, red
Porto	Porto Foot Ball Ltda.	26 April 2022; 3 years ago	Porto Ferreira	Ferreirão	green, white, black
Prata da Casa	Prata da Casa SAF	9 April 2024; 22 months ago	Mooca, São Paulo	Clube Escola da Mooca	light blue, white, dark blue
Real Soccer	Associação Academy Real Soccer Futebol Clube	8 May 2023; 2 years ago	Juquitiba	José Geraldo	violet, white
Referência	Referência Futebol Clube SAF (Note: Founded as Sport Club Brasil in Embu das Artes.)	2 April 2018; 7 years ago	Jaguaré, São Paulo	CT Floresto Bandecchi	orange, white
Salto	Salto Futebol Clube SAF	26 February 2020; 5 years ago	Salto	Amadeu Mosca	blue, red
Santa Fé	Santa Fé Futebol Clube	5 July 2021; 4 years ago	Santa Fé do Sul	Evandro de Paula	blue, white
Sfera	Sfera Futebol Clube SAF	1 April 2022; 3 years ago	Jarinu	CT Sfera	dark blue, light green
Sharjah Brasil (Note: Itapevi FC competed in a single professional edition, the 2012 Campeonato Paulista Segunda Divisão. It is currently a youth football academy, selling its professional license to Sharjah Brasil in 2022.)	Sharjah Brasil Futebol Clube Ltda.	9 April 2004; 21 years ago	Alumínio	José Ermírio de Moraes	blue, red
Terceiro Milênio	Esporte Clube Terceiro Milênio	23 January 2024; 2 years ago	Tatuapé, São Paulo	Clube Recreativo CERET	blue, white, red
União Iacanga	União Iacanga Futebol Clube	2 September 2019; 6 years ago	Iacanga	José Rossi	blue, white

== Participated in official tournaments ==
=== 21st century ===
Below are the clubs that continue in amateur or social activities, disaffiliated from the FPF, and played in the divisions of the Campeonato Paulista after 1 January 2000.

Club	Full name	Founded	Years active	Location	Colors
Cubatense (Note: Is currently a youth football academy.)	Atlético Real Cubatense	10 June 2016; 9 years ago	2016–2017	Cubatão	white, green
Palmeirinha	Sociedade Esportiva Palmeirinha	3 April 1955; 70 years ago	1967–2016	Porto Ferreira	green, white
Itapevi	Itapevi Futebol Clube	9 April 2004; 21 years ago	2012	Itapevi	blue, red
Roma (Note: Founded as Roma Barueri, it was champion of the 2001 edition of the Copa São Paulo de Futebol Júnior. In 2002 it moved to Apucarana, Paraná, returning to the state of São Paulo in 2007 in the city of Itapetininga, and returning again to Apucarana in the sequence. In 2021, the club incorporated Cincão Esporte Clube from Londrina and changed its name to the currently Apucarana Sports.)	Roma Esporte Clube	7 February 2000; 26 years ago	2001; 2007	Barueri; Itapetininga	red, blue
Jalesense	Jalesense Atlético Clube	3 January 1960; 66 years ago	1963–2005	Jales	red, white
Paraguaçuense	Esporte Clube Paraguaçuense	28 November 1965; 60 years ago	1966–2005	Paraguaçu Paulista	blue, white
Águas de Lindoia	Águas de Lindoia Esporte Clube	1 March 1970; 55 years ago	1993–2004	Águas de Lindoia	blue, white
Garça	Garça Futebol Clube	15 February 1965; 61 years ago	1966–2004	Garça	blue, white
Guarani Sumareense	Clube Atlético Guarani Sumareense	20 January 1966; 60 years ago	2003–2004	Sumaré	green, white
Santa Ritense	Associação Atlética Santa Ritense	27 January 1927; 99 years ago	1964–2004	Santa Rita do Passa Quatro	red, white
Gazeta	Esporte Clube Gazeta	7 September 1948; 77 years ago	1979–2002	Ourinhos	white, black
Guapira	Clube de Campo e Associação Atlética Guapira	20 October 1918; 107 years ago	1981–2002	Jaçanã, São Paulo	blue, white
Iracemapolense	Clube Atlético União Iracemapolense	1 May 1946; 79 years ago	1986–2001	Iracemápolis	white, green, red
Guararapes	Guararapes Esporte Clube	2 December 1964; 61 years ago	1965–2000	Guararapes	yellow, blue

=== 20th century ===
Below is a list of institutions that continue to exist and carry out other activities, but no longer have a football team.

Club	Full name	Founded	Years active	Location	Colors
SPAC	São Paulo Athletic Club (Note: Current Clube Atlético São Paulo.)	13 May 1888; 137 years ago	1902–1912	Consolação, São Paulo	blue, white
Paulistano	Club Athletico Paulistano	29 December 1900; 125 years ago	1902–1929	Jardim Paulista, São Paulo	white, red
Mackenzie	Associação Atlética Mackenzie College	18 August 1898; 127 years ago	1902–1938	Consolação, São Paulo	red, white
Germânia	Sport Club Germânia (Note: Current Esporte Clube Pinheiros.)	7 September 1899; 126 years ago	1902–1946	Pinheiros, São Paulo	blue, black
Ypiranga	Clube Atlético Ypiranga	10 July 1906; 119 years ago	1910–1959	Ipiranga, São Paulo	white, black
República	Associação Atlética República	23 January 1914; 112 years ago	1919–1934	República, São Paulo	red, white
Humberto Primo	Esporte Clube Humberto Primo (Note: Current Esporte Clube Vila Mariana.)	1 September 1914; 111 years ago	1919–1936	Vila Mariana, São Paulo	red, white
Scarpa	Associação Atlética Scarpa (Note: Current Clube Atlético Recreativo Maria Zélia.)	17 May 1916; 109 years ago	1924–1945	Belém, São Paulo	red, white
Sírio	Esporte Clube Sírio	14 July 1917; 108 years ago	1918–1945	Saúde, São Paulo	red, white
Parque da Mooca	Clube Atlético Parque da Mooca	26 August 1924; 101 years ago	1928–1980	Mooca, São Paulo	white, black
Primeiro de Maio	Primeiro de Maio Futebol Clube	18 August 1913; 112 years ago	1917–1940	Santo André (Note: Founded in São Bernardo do Campo, before the municipality of Santo André was split.)	white, green
São Caetano EC	São Caetano Esporte Clube	1 August 1914; 111 years ago	1919–1959	São Caetano do Sul	white, black
Votorantim	Clube Atlético Votorantim (Note: Founded as Sport Club Savoia, a name it kept until 1942.)	1 January 1900; 126 years ago	1918–1962	Votorantim	red, white
Ferroviária	Associação Atlética Ferroviária	3 May 1939; 86 years ago	1942–1967	Botucatu	red, white, black
Prudentina	Associação Prudentina de Esportes Atléticos	26 October 1936; 89 years ago	1942–1967	Presidente Prudente	red, white, black
BAC	Bauru Atlético Clube (Note: Founded as Associação Atlética Luzitana, a name it kept until 1946.)	1 May 1919; 106 years ago	1926–1968	Bauru	blue, white
São Carlos Clube	São Carlos Clube	9 January 1944; 82 years ago	1965–1969	São Carlos	blue, white
Corinthians	Corinthians Futebol Clube	15 August 1912; 113 years ago	1923–1970	Santo André	white, black
XI de Agosto	Associação Atlética XI de Agosto	11 August 1929; 96 years ago	1968–1972	Tatuí	red, white, black
Sanjoanense	Sociedade Esportiva Sanjoanense	1 July 1916; 109 years ago	1920–1988	São João da Boa Vista	red, white, black
São Bento	Associação Atlética São Bento	3 April 1928; 97 years ago	1944–1988	Marília	red, white
Nevense	Clube Atlético Nevense	30 November 1957; 68 years ago	1958–1990	Neves Paulista	red, white
DERAC	Departamento de Estradas de Rodagem Atlético Clube	28 December 1950; 75 years ago	1958–1994	Itapetininga	blue, yellow
Orlândia	Associação Atlética Orlândia	3 May 1920; 105 years ago	1949–1994	Orlândia	white, black
Palmital	Palmital Atlético Clube	19 December 1929; 96 years ago	1954–1997	Palmital	white, black
Esportiva	Associação Esportiva Guaratinguetá	3 November 1915; 110 years ago	1918–1998	Guaratinguetá	red, white

== Defunct clubs ==
=== 21st century ===
Below is a list of clubs that competed professionally in the divisions of the Campeonato Paulista from 1 January 2000 onwards and that completely dissolved their assets and/or CNPJ registration. Some clubs cease their activities and sell their licensing with the FPF to a new club.

Club	Full name	Founded	Dissolved	Location	Colors
Red Bull Bragantino II	Red Bull Bragantino II (Note: Founded as Red Bull Brasil in Campinas, a name kept until 2023. On 6 November 2024, the club announced its withdrawal from competitions, citing problems regarding inefficiency in the transfer of athletes between the club and the main team.)	19 November 2007	6 November 2024; 15 months ago	Bragança Paulista	red, blue, white
Paulistinha	Clube Atlético Paulistinha (Note: Inactive from professional football since 2013, the club's assets were liquidated by the Brazilian court on 26 April 2023.)	3 August 1958	23 April 2023; 2 years ago	São Carlos	red, black
Osasco	Osasco Futebol Clube	7 January 1971	28 May 2020; 5 years ago	Osasco	white, black
Boa Vista	Clube de Futebol Boa Vista Ltda.	16 September 2005	3 February 2019; 7 years ago	São João da Boa Vista	white, black
Guaratinguetá	Guaratinguetá Futebol Ltda.	1 October 1998	6 March 2017; 8 years ago	Guaratinguetá	blue, white, red
Cotia	Cotia Futebol Clube	1 January 2010	2017; 9 years ago	Cotia	blue, white
Litoral	Litoral Futebol Clube	1 June 2004	circa 2015; 11 years ago	Santos	green, yellow, blue
Américo	Américo Esporte Clube	25 September 2007	2014; 12 years ago	Américo Brasiliense	blue, orange, white
Brasa	Brasa Futebol Clube Ltda.	13 December 2007	31 January 2014; 12 years ago	Mirassol	white, green, yellow
Palmeiras B	Sociedade Esportiva Palmeiras B	26 August 2000	14 April 2013; 12 years ago	Perdizes, São Paulo	green, white
Saad (Note: The club moved its headquarters to Campo Grande, Mato Grosso do Sul from 2008 to 2011, competing mainly in women's football.)	Saad Esporte Clube	28 April 1961	2013; 13 years ago	São Caetano do Sul	blue, white
Sport Paulista	Sport Club Campo Limpo Paulista	13 April 2000	2009; 17 years ago	Campo Limpo Paulista (Note: The club also played in the cities of Caieiras, Salto and Espírito Santo do Pinhal.)	red, white, black
EC Lemense	Esporte Clube Lemense	17 June 1915	2005; 21 years ago	Leme	blue, white
Prudentino	Prudentino Futebol Clube	29 January 2001	2005; 21 years ago	Presidente Prudente	red, white
Serra Negra FC	Serra Negra Futebol Clube	10 September 1989	2004; 22 years ago	Serra Negra	green, white, red
CA Catanduvense	Clube Atlético Catanduvense	8 March 1999	3 December 2003; 22 years ago	Catanduva	red, white
Ponte Preta Sumaré	Ponte Preta Sumaré Futebol Clube	19 April 2001	2003; 23 years ago	Sumaré	white, black
Andradina	Andradina Futebol Clube	28 May 1963	2002; 24 years ago	Andradina	blue, white
Montenegro	Clube Atlético Montenegro	13 December 1999	2002; 24 years ago	Paranapanema	white, black
Corinthians	Esporte Clube Corinthians	8 February 1946	2001; 25 years ago	Presidente Prudente	white, black
Corinthians	Corinthians do Vale do Paraíba Futebol Clube	10 August 1998	2001; 25 years ago	Taubaté (Note: Founded in Caçapava.)	white, black
Osan	Grêmio Recreativo Osan	20 December 1990	2001; 25 years ago	Indaiatuba	blue, white, red
AA Votuporanguense	Associação Atlética Votuporanguense	23 December 1956	2000; 26 years ago	Votuporanga	white, black
Estrela	Estrela Esporte Clube	10 January 1976	2000; 26 years ago	Porto Feliz (Note: Founded in Itu, the club also played matches in Vinhedo.)	white, green
Itaquaquecetuba	Itaquaquecetuba Atlético Clube	25 November 1980	2000; 26 years ago	Itaquaquecetuba	red, black

=== 20th century ===
Club	Full name	Founded	Dissolved	Location	Colors
CA Internacional	Clube Atlético Internacional	7 November 1902	1910; 116 years ago	Santos	white, black
SC Americano	Sport Club Americano	21 May 1903	1916; 110 years ago	Consolação, São Paulo	green, yellow
Scottish Wanderers	Scottish Wanderers Football Club (Note: Dissent of the São Paulo Athletic Club.)	1914	1916; 110 years ago	Consolação, São Paulo	blue, white
União Lapa	União Lapa Football Club	1 September 1910	1930; 96 years ago	Lapa, São Paulo	white, blue
AA das Palmeiras	Associação Atlética das Palmeiras	9 November 1902	1933; 93 years ago	Bom Retiro, São Paulo	black, white
Antarctica	Antarctica Football Club (Note: Merged with Sport Club Internacional into Clube Atlético Paulista.)	1 July 1914	1933; 93 years ago	Mooca, São Paulo	red, white
SC Internacional	Sport Club Internacional (Note: Merged with Antarctica Football Club into Clube Atlético Paulista.)	19 August 1899	1933; 93 years ago	Bom Retiro, São Paulo	red, black
AA São Bento	Associação Atlética São Bento	1 January 1914	1935; 91 years ago	República, São Paulo	blue, white
Albion	Club Athletico Albion (Note: Founded as Associação Athletica São Paulo Alpargatas, a name kept until 1932. It ceased its activities after abandoning the 1936 Campeonato Paulista.)	24 May 1921	1936; 90 years ago	Cambuci, São Paulo	white, blue, red
Estudante	Clube Atlético Estudante de São Paulo (Note: Dissent of the São Paulo FC, merged with Clube Atlético Paulista into Clube Atlético Estudante Paulista.)	1 June 1935	1937; 89 years ago	Bom Retiro, São Paulo	red, white, black
CA Paulista	Clube Atlético Paulista (Note: Merged with Clube Atlético Estudante into Clube Atlético Estudante Paulista.)	1933	1937; 89 years ago	Mooca, São Paulo	red, white, black
Estudante Paulista	Clube Atlético Estudante Paulista (Note: Incorporated by São Paulo FC in 1938.)	1937	14 July 1938; 87 years ago	Mooca, São Paulo	red, white, black
Luzitano FC	Luzitano Futebol Clube	1 January 1920	1938; 88 years ago	Brás, São Paulo	red, green
CE América	Clube Esportivo América (Note: Founded as Foot-Ball Club Flor do Ypiranga, the club changed its name to Club Athletico Siléx in 1923 and Clube Esportivo América in 1930.)	14 June 1914	1945; 81 years ago	Ipiranga, São Paulo	red, white
Minas Gerais	Minas Gerais Futebol Clube (Note: Founded as Minas Geraes Football Club, the club changed its name to Auto Sport Club in 1917. In 1927 merged with Club Athletico Audax, becoming known as Auto-Audax. In 1932 the club was renamed again to Minas Gerais FC, a name it held until 1947 when it was dissolved definitely.)	21 April 1910	1947; 79 years ago	Brás, São Paulo	red, white
AA São Bento	Associação Atlética São Bento (Note: Merger of São Caetano EC and Comercial FC from São Paulo, unrelated to the first AA São Bento. The merger was undone after the 1957 Campeonato Paulista.)	1954	1958; 68 years ago	São Caetano do Sul	blue, white
Comercial	Comercial Futebol Clube	3 April 1939	1979; 47 years ago	Sé, São Paulo	red, white
GE Catanduvense	Grêmio Esportivo Catanduvense (Note: Founded as Grêmio Esportivo Catanduvense, the club changed its name to Grêmio Esportivo Catanduva and Catanduva Esporte Clube before closing its doors in 1996.)	2 May 1970	1996; 30 years ago	Catanduva	red, white
GE Novorizontino	Grêmio Esportivo Novorizontino	11 March 1973	1999; 27 years ago	Novo Horizonte	yellow, black

== Bibliography ==
- Rodolfo Kussarev, Bernardo Itri (2021). 125 Anos de História - A Enciclopédia do Futebol Paulista (in Portuguese). FPF. ISBN 659960630X.
