= Campeonato Paulista Série A3 =

Football championship in Brazil

Campeonato Paulista - Série A3
- Organising body: FPF
- Founded: 1919–1933 (as a Campeonato Paulista run by different leagues); 1941–1947 (as a Campeonato Paulista run by FPFA); 1954–present (as a Campeonato Paulista under the authority of the FPF)
- Country: Brazil
- State: (São Paulo (state)) São Paulo
- Level on pyramid: 3
- Promotion to: Série A2
- Relegation to: Série A4
- Domestic cup: Copa Paulista
- Current champions: Portuguesa Santista (1st title) (2026)
- Most championships: Sertãozinho (4 titles)
- Website: FPF Official website

Campeonato Paulista Série A3 is the third tier of the professional state football league in the Brazilian state of São Paulo. It is run by the São Paulo State Football Federation (FPF). The tournament has been known as Série A3 since the 1993–94 season.

== Structure ==
The current format of the Paulistão A3 was introduced in 2018, after the number of teams was decreased from 20 to 16. Two teams are promoted to Série A2, and the bottom two teams are relegated to Campeonato Paulista Segunda Divisão.

=== First stage ===
Each of the 16 competitors play each other once in the first stage of the competition, for a total of 15 matches between mid-January and early-April. A win earns three points and a draw earns one point. Teams are ranked by total points, then by total wins and finally by goal difference, number of scored goals, lower number of yellow and red cards taken. If teams are still level, a random draw is made to determine the final order in the standings. The 15th and 16th-placed teams are relegated to the state league fourth division.

=== Knockout phase ===
The top 8 teams from the first stage qualify for the knockout phase. The knock-out ties are played in a two-legged format. The eight teams are seeded 1 to 8 according to their first stage table positions, The top seed team plays the eight-seeded, the second plays the seventh, the third plays the sixth and the fourth plays the fifth. The winning teams are then reseeded, taking into account their quarterfinals results.

In the semifinals, the highest-seeded team plays the lowest, and the other two winners from the previous round play each other. The winners of those contests win promotion to the Campeonato Paulista Série A2 and go on to face one another in the finals, which are also played in a two-legged format.

== Clubs ==
2026 Série A3

Team	City	Ground	2025 result
Bandeirante	Birigui	Pedro Berbel	14th
Catanduva	Catanduva	Sílvio Salles	7th
Desportivo Brasil	Porto Feliz	Ernesto Rocco	5th
EC São Bernardo	São Bernardo do Campo	Primeiro de Maio	13th
Francana	Franca	José Lancha Filho	12th
Itapirense	Itapira	Coronel Francisco Vieira	8th
Marília	Marília	Bento de Abreu	3rd
Paulista	Jundiaí	Jayme Cintra	1st (Série A4)
Portuguesa Santista	Santos	Ulrico Mursa	15th (Série A2)
Rio Branco	Americana	Décio Vitta	4th
Rio Claro	Rio Claro	Augusto Schmidt	16th (Série A2)
Rio Preto	São José do Rio Preto	Anísio Haddad	9th
União Barbarense	Santa Bárbara d'Oeste	Antônio Guimarães	2nd (Série A4)
União São João	Araras	Hermínio Ometto	6th
União Suzano	Suzano	Francisco Marques Figueira	10th
XV de Jaú	Jaú	Zezinho Magalhães	11th

== List of champions ==
There are all the championship editions, officially recognized by Federação Paulista de Futebol.

Year	Edition	Federation	Champion	City	Runners-up	City
1919	1	APEA	Independência	São Paulo	Audax	São Paulo
1920	2	APEA	Estrella de Ouro	São Paulo	Audax	São Paulo
1921	3	APEA	Spartanos	São Paulo	Oriente	São Paulo
1922	4	APEA	São Geraldo	São Paulo	Flor do Belém	São Paulo
1923	5	APEA	Flor do Belém	São Paulo	Roma FC	São Paulo
1924	6	APEA	República	São Paulo	Santo Amaro	São Paulo
1925	7	APEA	Estrella de Ouro	São Paulo	Progresso	São Paulo
1926	8	APEA	Scarpa	São Paulo	Colombo	São Paulo
1926	8	LAF	Touring	São Paulo	Tiradentes	São Paulo
1927	9	LAF (Capital)	Atlético Brasil	São Paulo	Portugueza	São Paulo
1927	9	LAF (Santos)	Botafogo	Santos	Bahia FC	Santos
1928	10	APEA	Estrella de Ouro	São Paulo	Scarpa	São Paulo
1929	11	APEA	Ordem e Progresso	São Paulo	São Caetano EC	São Caetano do Sul
1930	12	APEA	São Caetano EC	São Caetano do Sul	Luso Brasileiro	São Paulo
1931	13	APEA	Luzitano	São Paulo	União dos Operários	São Paulo
1932	14	APEA	Parque da Mooca	São Paulo	São Geraldo	São Paulo
1933	15	APEA	Jardim América	São Paulo	Castellões	São Paulo
1941	16	FPFA	América	São Paulo	Unknown	
1942	17	FPFA	União Vasco da Gama	São Paulo	Sorocabana	São Paulo
1943	18	FPFA	Penhense	São Paulo	Nitro-Química	São Paulo
1944	19	FPFA	São Cristovão	São Paulo	Minas Gerais	São Paulo
1945	20	FPFA	Açucena	São Paulo	Vigor	São Paulo
1946	21	FPFA	Açucena	São Paulo	Silvicultura	São Paulo
1947	22	FPFA (Capital)	União Silva Teles	São Paulo	Açucena	São Paulo
1947	22	FPFA (Countryside)	Rio Pardo	São José do Rio Pardo	Associação Botucatuense	Botucatu
1954	23	FPF	CA Ituano	Itu	Velo Clube	Rio Claro
1955	24	FPF	CA Ituano	Itu	Santacruzense	Santa Cruz do Rio Pardo
1956	25	FPF	Tanabi	Tanabi	Elvira	Jacareí
1957	26	FPF	Expresso São Carlos	São Carlos	Monte Aprazível	Monte Aprazível
1958	27	FPF	Nevense	Neves Paulista	Estrela	Piquete
1959	28	FPF	Irmãos Romano	São Bernardo do Campo	DERAC	Itapetininga
1960	29	FPF	Prudentina	Presidente Prudente	Paulista	Jundiaí
1961	30	FPF	Estrada Sorocabana	Sorocaba	Usina São João	Araras
1962	31	FPF	Santacruzense	Santa Cruz do Rio Pardo	Inter de Limeira	Limeira
1963	32	FPF	Rio Preto	São José do Rio Preto	Usina São João	Araras
1964	33	FPF	Taquaritinga	Taquaritinga	Volkswagen Clube	São Bernardo do Campo
1965	34	FPF	São José	São José dos Campos	Linense	Lins
1966	35	FPF	Inter de Limera	Limeira	Tie for champion	
1966	35	FPF	Ituveravense	Ituverava	Tie for champion	
1967	36	FPF	União Barbarense	Santa Bárbara d'Oeste	São Bento	Sorocaba
1968	37	FPF	Vasco da Gama	Americana	Municipal	Paraguaçu Paulista
1969	38	FPF	Garça	Garça	Rio Branco	Ibitinga
1970	39	FPF	Rio Branco	Ibitinga	Sertãozinho	Sertãozinho
1971	40	FPF	Sertãozinho	Sertãozinho	Rio Claro	Rio Claro
1972	41	FPF	José Bonifácio	José Bonifácio	Pirassununguense	Pirassununga
1973	42	FPF	Independente	Limeira	Cafelandense	Cafelândia
1974	43	FPF	Guarani	Adamantina	Penapolense	Penápolis
1975	44	FPF	Not finished			
1976	45	FPF	Guairense	Guaíra	Capivariano	Capivari
1977	46	FPF	Pinhalense	Espírito Santo do Pinhal	Linense	Lins
1978	47	FPF	AA Votuporanguense	Votuporanga	Radium	Mococa
1979	48	FPF	Palmeiras	São João da Boa Vista	Amparo	Amparo
1980	49	FPF	EC Lemense	Leme	Tanabi	Tanabi
1981	50	FPF	Cruzeiro	Cruzeiro	Novorizontino	Novo Horizonte
1982	51	FPF	Barra Bonita	Barra Bonita	Funilense	Cosmópolis
1983	52	FPF	Lençoense	Lençóis Paulista	Jalesense	Jales
1984	53	FPF	Capivariano	Capivari	Garça	Garça
1985	54	FPF	Mauaense	Mauá	Mirassol	Mirassol
1986	55	FPF	Descalvadense	Descalvado	Santacruzense	Santa Cruz do Rio Pardo
1987	56	FPF	Palmital	Palmital	José Bonifácio	José Bonifácio
1987	56	FPF	Sanjoanense	São João da Boa Vista	Estrela	Itu
1988	57	FPF	Jacareí	Jacareí	Olímpia	Olímpia
1989	58	FPF	Sãocarlense	São Carlos	Sertãozinho	Sertãozinho
1990	59	FPF	Jaboticabal	Jaboticabal	União Barbarense	Santa Bárbara d'Oeste
1991	60	FPF	AD São Caetano	São Caetano do Sul	Velo Clube	Rio Claro
1992	61	FPF	Oeste	Itápolis	Guaçuano	Mogi Guaçu
1993	62	FPF	Jabaquara	Santos	Estrela	Itu
1994	63	FPF	Nacional	São Paulo	Rio Preto	São José do Rio Preto
1995	64	FPF	Noroeste	Bauru	Paulista	Jundiaí
1996	65	FPF	Matonense	Matão	Francana	Franca
1997	66	FPF	Mirassol	Mirassol	União Barbarense	Santa Bárbara d'Oeste
1998	67	FPF	AD São Caetano	São Caetano do Sul	Taubaté	Taubaté
1999	68	FPF	Rio Preto	São José do Rio Preto	Oeste	Itápolis
2000	69	FPF	Nacional	São Paulo	Garça	Garça
2001	70	FPF	São Bento	Sorocaba	Atlético Sorocaba	Sorocaba
2002	71	FPF	Oeste	Itápolis	Taquaritinga	Taquaritinga
2003	72	FPF	Taubaté	Taubaté	AE Araçatuba	Araçatuba
2004	73	FPF	Sertãozinho	Sertãozinho	Mirassol	Mirassol
2005	74	FPF	Grêmio Barueri	Barueri	Palmeiras B	São Paulo
2006	75	FPF	Botafogo	Ribeirão Preto	São José	São José dos Campos
2007	76	FPF	Olímpia	Olímpia	Monte Azul	Monte Azul Paulista
2008	77	FPF	Flamengo	Guarulhos	São Bernardo FC	São Bernardo do Campo
2009	78	FPF	Votoraty	Votorantim	Grêmio Osasco	Osasco
2010	79	FPF	Red Bull Brasil	Campinas	Ferroviária	Araraquara
2011	80	FPF	Penapolense	Penápolis	Santacruzense	Santa Cruz do Rio Pardo
2012	81	FPF	Rio Branco	Americana	Grêmio Osasco	Osasco
2013	82	FPF	São Bento	Sorocaba	Batatais	Batatais
2014	83	FPF	Novorizontino	Novo Horizonte	Independente	Limeira
2015	84	FPF	Taubaté	Taubaté	CA Votuporanguense	Votuporanga
2016	85	FPF	Sertãozinho	Sertãozinho	Rio Preto	São José do Rio Preto
2017	86	FPF	Nacional	São Paulo	Inter de Limeira	Limeira
2018	87	FPF	Atibaia	Atibaia	Portuguesa Santista	Santos
2019	88	FPF	Grêmio Audax	Osasco	Monte Azul	Monte Azul Paulista
2020	89	FPF	Velo Clube	Rio Claro	EC São Bernardo	São Bernardo do Campo
2021	90	FPF	Linense	Lins	Primavera	Indaiatuba
2022	91	FPF	Noroeste	Bauru	Comercial	Ribeirão Preto
2023	92	FPF	Capivariano	Capivari	São José	São José dos Campos
2024	93	FPF	CA Votuporanguense	Votuporanga	Grêmio Prudente	Presidente Prudente
2025	94	FPF	Sertãozinho	Sertãozinho	Monte Azul	Monte Azul Paulista
2026	95	FPF	Portuguesa Santista	Santos	Marília	Marília

Federations

Amateur Era (1919-1947)

- APEA - Associação Paulista de Esportes Atléticos
- LAF - Liga dos Amadores de Football
- FPFA - Federação Paulista de Futebol Amador

Professional Era (1954-)

- FPF - Federação Paulista de Futebol

Names change

- EC Vasco da Gama was changed the name to Americana EC.
- SC Atibaia is the currently Lemense FC.

Cities change

- Oeste FC has moved from Itápolis to Barueri.
- Red Bull Brasil has moved from Campinas to Bragança Paulista, due to the partnership between Red Bull and CA Bragantino (Red Bull Bragantino). Red Bull Brasil became the B team.

== Titles by club ==
Teams in bold stills active.

Rank	Club	Winners	Winning years
1	**Sertãozinho**	4	1971, 2004, 2016, 2025
2	Estrella de Ouro	3	1920, 1925, 1928
2	**Nacional**	3	1994, 2000, 2017
4	Açucena	2	1945 FPFA, 1946 FPFA
4	**Capivariano**	2	1984, 2023
4	CA Ituano	2	1954, 1955
4	**Noroeste**	2	1995, 2022
4	**Oeste**	2	1992, 2012
4	**Rio Preto**	2	1963, 1999
4	**São Bento**	2	2001, 2013
4	**AD São Caetano**	2	1991, 1998
4	**Taubaté**	2	2003, 2015
13	CE América	1	1941 FPFA
13	Atlético Brasil	1	1927 LAF (Capital)
13	Barra Bonita	1	1982
13	**Botafogo (Ribeirão Preto)**	1	2006
13	Botafogo (Santos)	1	1927 LAF (Santos)
13	Cruzeiro	1	1981
13	Descalvadense	1	1986
13	Estrada Sorocabana	1	1961
13	Expresso São Carlos	1	1957
13	**Flamengo**	1	2008
13	Flor do Belém	1	1923
13	Garça	1	1969
13	**Grêmio Audax**	1	2019
13	Grêmio Barueri	1	2005
13	Guairense	1	1976
13	Guarani (Adamantina)	1	1974
13	Independência	1	1919
13	**Independente**	1	1973
13	**Inter de Limeira**	1	1966 (shared)
13	Irmãos Romano	1	1959
13	Ituveravense	1	1966 (shared)
13	**Jabaquara**	1	1993
13	Jaboticabal	1	1990
13	Jacareí	1	1988
13	Jardim América	1	1933
13	José Bonifácio	1	1972
13	EC Lemense	1	1980
13	**Lemense FC**	1	2018
13	Lençoense	1	1983
13	**Linense**	1	2021
13	Luzitano	1	1931
13	**Matonense**	1	1996
13	**Mauaense**	1	1985
13	**Mirassol**	1	1997
13	Nevense	1	1958
13	**Novorizontino**	1	2014
13	**Olímpia**	1	2007
13	Ordem e Progresso	1	1929
13	Palmeiras (SJBV)	1	1979
13	Palmital	1	1986 (shared)
13	Parque da Mooca	1	1932
13	**Penapolense**	1	2011
13	Penhense	1	1943 FPFA
13	Pinhalense	1	1977
13	**Portuguesa Santista**	1	2026
13	Prudentina	1	1960
13	**Red Bull Brasil**	1	2010
13	República	1	1924
13	**Rio Branco (Americana)**	1	2012
13	Rio Branco (Ibitinga)	1	1970
13	Rio Pardo	1	1947 FPFA (Countryside)
13	Sanjoanense	1	1986 (shared)
13	**Santacruzense**	1	1962
13	São Caetano EC	1	1930
13	São Cristovão	1	1944 FPFA
13	São Geraldo	1	1922
13	**São José**	1	1965
13	**Sãocarlense**	1	1989
13	Scarpa	1	1926 APEA
13	Spartanos	1	1921
13	**Tanabi**	1	1956
13	**Taquaritinga**	1	1964
13	Touring	1	1926 LAF
13	**União Barbarense**	1	1967
13	União Silva Teles	1	1947 FPFA (Capital)
13	União Vasco da Gama	1	1942 FPFA
13	Vasco da Gama (Americana)	1	1968
13	**Velo Clube**	1	2020
13	Votoraty	1	2009
13	AA Votuporanguense	1	1978
13	**CA Votuporanguense**	1	2024

=== Titles by city ===
City	Championships	Clubs
São Paulo	25	Estrella de Ouro (3), Nacional (3), Açucena (2), CE América (1), Atlético Brasil (1), Flor do Belém (1), Independência (1), Jardim América (1), Luzitano (1), Ordem e Progresso (1), Parque da Mooca (1), Penhense (1), República, São Cristovão (1), São Geraldo (1), Scarpa (1), Spartanos (1), Touring (1), União Silva Teles (1), União Vasco da Gama (1)
Sertãozinho	4	Sertãozinho (4)
Santos	3	Botafogo (1), Portuguesa Santista (1), Jabaquara (1)
São Caetano do Sul	3	AD São Caetano (2), São Caetano EC (1)
Sorocaba	3	São Bento (2), Estrada Sorocabana (1)
Americana	2	Rio Branco (1), Vasco da Gama (1)
Bauru	2	Noroeste (2)
Capivari	2	Capivariano (2)
Itápolis	2	Oeste (2)
Itu	2	CA Ituano (2)
Limeira	2	Independente (1), Inter de Limeira (1)
São Carlos	2	Expresso São Carlos (1), Sãocarlense (1)
São João da Boa Vista	2	Palmeiras (1), Sanjoanense (1)
São José do Rio Preto	2	Rio Preto (2)
Taubaté	2	Taubaté (2)
Votuporanga	2	AA Votuporanguense (1), CA Votuporanguense (1)
Adamantina	1	Guarani (1)
Atibaia	1	Atibaia (1)
Barra Bonita	1	Barra Bonita (1)
Barueri	1	Grêmio Barueri (1)
Campinas	1	Red Bull Brasil
Cruzeiro	1	Cruzeiro (1)
Descalvado	1	Descalvadense (1)
Espírito Santo do Pinhal	1	Pinhalense (1)
Garça	1	Garça (1)
Guaíra	1	Guairense (1)
Guarulhos	1	Flamengo (1)
Ibitinga	1	Rio Branco (1)
Ituverava	1	Ituveravense (1)
Jaboticabal	1	Jaboticabal (1)
Jacareí	1	Jacareí (1)
José Bonifácio	1	José Bonifácio (1)
Leme	1	EC Lemense (1)
Lençóis Paulista	1	Lençoense (1)
Lins	1	Linense (1)
Matão	1	Matonense (1)
Mauá	1	Mauaense (1)
Mirassol	1	Mirassol (1)
Neves Paulista	1	Nevense (1)
Novo Horizonte	1	Novorizontino (1)
Olímpia	1	Olímpia (1)
Osasco	1	Grêmio Audax (1)
Palmital	1	Palmital (1)
Penápolis	1	Penapolense (1)
Presidente Prudente	1	Prudentina (1)
Ribeirão Preto	1	Botafogo (1)
Rio Claro	1	Velo Clube (1)
Santa Bárbara d'Oeste	1	União Barbarense (1)
Santa Cruz do Rio Pardo	1	Santacruzense (1)
São Bernardo do Campo	1	Irmãos Romano (1)
São José do Rio Pardo	1	Rio Pardo (1)
São José dos Campos	1	São José (1)
Tanabi	1	Tanabi (1)
Taquaritinga	1	Taquaritinga (1)
Votorantim	1	Votoraty (1)

== Teams promoted from Série A3 ==
Season	Winner	Runner-up	Other promoted clubs
1994	Nacional	Rio Preto	Portuguesa Santista
1995	Noroeste	Lousano Paulista	Bandeirante
1996	Matonense	Francana	Corinthians de Presidente Prudente
1997	Mirassol	União Barbarense	—
1998	São Caetano	—	—
1999	Rio Preto	Oeste	—
2000 (Note: Olímpia were first stage champions and played in Série A2 the same year)	Nacional	—	—
2001	São Bento	Atlético Sorocaba	Bandeirante, Flamengo de Guarulhos, Marília (Note: due to the 2002 Torneio Rio-São Paulo five teams were promoted for the 2002 season)
2002	Oeste	Taquaritinga	—
2003	Taubaté	Araçatuba	—
2004	Sertãozinho	Mirassol	Guaratinguetá, Noroeste
2005	Grêmio Barueri	Palmeiras B	Rio Claro, XV de Piracicaba
2006	Botafogo de Ribeirão Preto	São José	Osvaldo Cruz, XV de Jaú
2007	Olímpia	Monte Azul	Catanduvense, Ferroviária
2008	Flamengo de Guarulhos	São Bernardo	Linense, União Barbarense
2009	Votoraty	Grêmio Osasco	Osvaldo Cruz, Pão de Açúcar
2010	Red Bull Brasil	Ferroviária	Palmeiras B, XV de Piracicaba
2011	Penapolense	Santacruzense	São Carlos, Velo Clube
2012	Rio Branco	Grêmio Osasco	Capivariano, Juventus
2013	São Bento	Batatais	Itapirense, Marília
2014	Novorizontino	Independente de Limeira	Água Santa, Matonense
2015	Taubaté	Votuporanguense	Barretos, Juventus
2016	Sertãozinho	Rio Preto	—
2017	Nacional	Inter de Limeira	—
2018	Atibaia	Portuguesa Santista	—
2019	Audax	Monte Azul	—
2020	Velo Clube	EC São Bernardo	—
2021	Linense	Primavera	—
2022	Noroeste	Comercial	—
2023	Capivariano	São José	—
2024	Votuporanguense	Grêmio Prudente	—
2025	Sertãozinho	Monte Azul	—
2026	Portuguesa Santista	Marília	—

== Relegated teams ==
Season	Clubs
1994	Tanabi, Independente, EC São Bernardo
1995	Barretos, Central Brasileira
1996	Monte Azul, Taquaritinga, Marília
1997	Fernandópolis
1998	none ^{[a]}
1999	Taquaritinga, Mauaense
2000	Ferroviária, Corinthians (PP)
2001	none ^{[b]}
2002	Garça, União Mogi
2003	Paraguaçuense, Ferroviária
2004	Sãocarlense, Inter de Bebedouro
2005	Taboão da Serra, ECUS, Jaboticabal
2006	Itararé, São Vicente, Barretos, Matonense
2007	ECO, Primavera, Mauaense, Araçatuba
2008	Taubaté, SEV Hortolândia, Independente, Santacruzense
2009	Oeste Paulista, Inter de Limeira, Nacional, União Mogi
2010	Força, Portuguesa Santista, Olímpia, Bandeirante
2011	Paulínia, SC Barueri, Taquaritinga, CA Lemense
2012	Inter de Bebedouro, XV de Jaú, Osvaldo Cruz, Taboão da Serra
2013	São Vicente, Palmeiras B, Barretos, União São João
2014	São Carlos, América de Rio Preto, Noroeste, Guaçuano
2015	Cotia FC, Tupã, Santacruzense, Francana
2016	São José, Itapirense, Guaratinguetá, Primavera, Fernandópolis, Grêmio Barueri
2017	Comercial, São José dos Campos FC, Paulista, Flamengo, Independente, Catanduvense
2018	Rio Branco, Marília, União Barbarense, Manthiqueira, Matonense, Mogi Mirim
2019	Taboão da Serra, São Carlos
2020	Grêmio Osasco, Paulista
2021	Penapolense, Batatais
2022	Nacional, Olímpia
2023	Barretos, Audax
2024	Matonense, São Caetano
2025	Lemense FC, Comercial
2026	Desportivo Brasil, União Suzano

^{a} São Bento were saved from relegation due to the withdrawal of Novorizontino in the 2nd level.

^{b} No teams were relegated due to the 2002 Torneio Rio-São Paulo.

== Top scorers ==
Season	Top scorer	Club	Goals
2007	Marcelo Nicácio	Votoraty	19
2008	Fausto	Linense	25
2009	Magrão	Penapolense	16
2010	Viola	Penapolense	18
2011	Reginaldo	Velo Clube	16
2012	Silas Brindeiro	Capivariano	15
2012	Billy	Guaçuano	15
2013	Jackson	Flamengo de Guarulhos	20
2014	Dairo	Independente de Limeira	11
2015	Anderson Cavalo	Votuporanguense	16
2016	Ermínio	Rio Preto	14
2017	Léo Castro	Nacional	11
2018	Bill	Capivariano	16
2019	Matheus Marcondele	Audax	11
2019	Lucas Pajeú	Desportivo Brasil	11
2020	Lucas Duni	Velo Clube	9
2021	Éder Paulista	Nacional	13
2022	Yuri	Capivariano	10
2023	Vinícius Popó	Capivariano	18
2024	Guilherme Maranhão	Grêmio Prudente	11
2025	Gui Sales	Monte Azul	11
2026	Lucas Lima	Marília	9

== See also ==
- Campeonato Paulista
- Campeonato Paulista Série A2
- Campeonato Paulista Série A4
- Campeonato Paulista Segunda Divisão
- Campeonato Paulista Série B3
- Federação Paulista de Futebol
