= Vágner Benazzi =

Brazilian footballer (1954–2023)

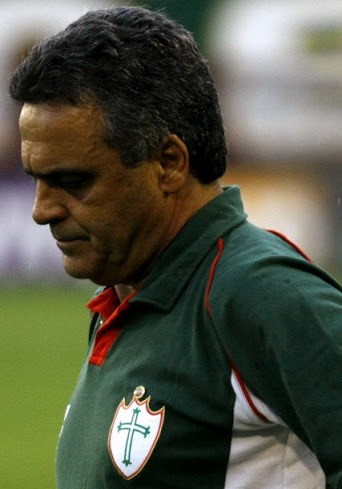
- Benazzi in 2010

Personal information
- Full name: Vágner Benazzi de Andrade
- Date of birth: 17 July 1954
- Place of birth: Osasco, São Paulo, Brazil
- Date of death: 22 May 2023 (aged 68)
- Place of death: Osasco, São Paulo, Brazil
- Height: 1.82 m (6 ft 0 in)
- Position: Right-back

Youth career
- 1967–1969: Nacional (SP)
- 1970–1971: Portuguesa

Senior career*
Years	Team	Apps	(Gls)
1972	Operário (MS)		
1973	Portuguesa		
1974	Sampaio Corrêa		
1975–1977	Juventude		
1978	XV de Jaú		
1979–1980	Comercial		
1981–1982	Palmeiras		
1983	São José		
1984	Paulista		
1985	Botafogo-PB		
1985	Taquaritinga		
1986	Independente de Limeira		
1988	Lençoense		
1989	Sãocarlense		

Managerial career
- 1989–1990: Sãocarlense
- 1990: Lençoense
- 1990: União Barbarense
- 1990: Comercial
- 1991: Sãocarlense
- 1991: Lemense
- 1991: Taquaritinga
- 1992–1993: Sãocarlense
- 1994: Comercial
- 1994: Portuguesa Santista
- 1995: União Barbarense
- 1996: Bragantino
- 1996: Paulista
- 1996: Paraguaçuense
- 1997: União Barbarense
- 1998: Gama
- 1998–1999: Paulista
- 1999–2000: São José (SP)
- 2000: Santo André
- 2001: Atlético Sorocaba
- 2001: Santo André
- 2001: Figueirense
- 2002: Santo André
- 2002: Náutico
- 2003: Figueirense
- 2003: Brasiliense
- 2004: Criciúma
- 2004: Paysandu
- 2005: Fortaleza
- 2005: Joinville
- 2006: Avaí
- 2006–2008: Portuguesa
- 2008: Ponte Preta
- 2009: Vila Nova
- 2009–2010: Portuguesa
- 2010–2011: Avaí
- 2011: Bahia
- 2011: Vitória
- 2012: Botafogo (SP)
- 2013: Bragantino
- 2013: Atlético Sorocaba
- 2013: Bragantino
- 2014: Paysandu
- 2014: Comercial
- 2014: Guarani
- 2014: Portuguesa
- 2015: Bragantino
- 2016: Nacional de Manaus
- * Club domestic league appearances and goals

Vágner Benazzi de Andrade (17 July 1954 – 22 May 2023) was a Brazilian professional football coach and former player who played as a right-back. During his tenure as a coach, he gained recognition as the "Rei do Acesso" (King of Promotions) due to his remarkable achievements in leading lower division clubs to higher tiers. Throughout his career, Benazzi guided a total of six different clubs to promotion, encompassing both the Campeonato Brasileiro and the Campeonato Paulista. He was also known for his ability to successfully steer teams clear of relegation.

As a player, he enjoyed a professional career spanning 16 years, during which he represented teams such as Comercial, Juventude, and Palmeiras.

== Club career ==
Benazzi's early footballing journey involved playing for the youth teams of Nacional-SP and Portuguesa. Subsequently, in 1972, he embarked on his professional career as a right-back with Operário de Campo Grande. In 1973, Benazzi made his return to Lusa, where he joined the squad that went on to clinch the Campeonato Paulista title that year. Following a one-year stint with Sampaio Corrêa, he played for Juventude from 1975 to 1978.

In 1978, Benazzi briefly played for XV de Jaú before making a move to Comercial de Ribeirão Preto the following year. It was during his time at Comercial that he truly made his mark, delivering standout performances in the 1979 and 1980 editions of the Campeonato Paulista. Benazzi's exceptional performances caught the attention of Palmeiras, leading to his signing with the club for a two-season stint. However, his time with Verdão did not yield significant success.

Following his departure from Palmeiras, Benazzi spent a year with São José before joining Paulista, where he was part of the squad that finished second in the 1984 Campeonato Paulista second division. In 1985, he played for Botafogo-PB in the Campeonato Brasileiro Série A and for Taquaritinga in the Paulistão second tier. In the final years of his career, Benazzi went on to represent Independente de Limeira, Lençoense, and Grêmio Sãocarlense, concluding his professional journey with the latter in 1989.

== Coaching career ==
In 1989, Benazzi took up his first major coaching role as he led his former team, Grêmio Sãocarlense, to the Campeonato Paulista Third Division title, beating Sertãozinho in the finals. Benazzi replicated his success the following year by guiding União Barbarense to promotion to the second division. In 1991, he took on his first coaching role in the second tier of state football, where he led Lemense to a second-place finish. The subsequent year, he achieved further triumph by securing the title with Taquaritinga.

Following a second stint with Sãocarlense and a brief spell with Comercial, Benazzi took Portuguesa Santista to the second division in 1994. In the 1990s, he also worked in Bragantino, Paraguaçuense and União Barbarense. He took the latter to their first-ever promotion to the top flight of the Campeonato Paulista, in 1998.

Benazzi joined Avaí in 2006, helping the club to achieve a place in 2007 Copa do Brasil. He subsequently moved to Portuguesa, being promoted with the club and also winning the Campeonato Paulista Série A2.

On 10 October 2010, after managing Ponte Preta, Vila Nova and Portuguesa, Benazzi returned to Avaí, with the club narrowly avoiding relegation in the year's Campeonato Brasileiro Série A. On 14 February of the following year, however, he was relieved of his duties.

Benazzi also managed Bahia, and after being dismissed joined fierce rivals Vitória, leaving the latter in December 2011. He was later in charge of Botafogo-SP, Bragantino (two stints), Atlético Sorocaba, Paysandu, Comercial-SP and Guarani. He rescinded with the latter on 14 September, joining Portuguesa a day after.

== Death ==
Benazzi died in Osasco on 22 May 2023, at the age of 68.

== Honours ==
=== Player ===
Portuguesa

- Campeonato Paulista: 1973

Juventude

- Copa Governador do Estado: 1975, 1976

=== Coach ===
Grêmio Sãocarlense

- Campeonato Paulista Third Division: 1989

Taquaritinga

- Campeonato Paulista Second Division: 1992

União Barbarense

- Campeonato Paulista Série A2: 1998

Gama

- Campeonato Brasiliense: 1998, 2000
- Campeonato Brasileiro Série B: 1998

Figueirense

- Campeonato Catarinense: 2001, 2003

Fortaleza

- Campeonato Cearense: 2005
