= Keigo Numata =

Japanese footballer

Keigo Numata 沼田 圭悟
Personal information
- Full name: Keigo Numata
- Date of birth: July 24, 1990 (age 36)
- Place of birth: Gifu, Japan
- Height: 1.70 m (5 ft 7 in)
- Position: Left back

Team information
- Current team: Renofa Yamaguchi FC
- Number: 14

Youth career
- 2003–2005: Takasaki FC
- 2006–2008: Takasaki City Univ. of Economics HS

Senior career*
Years	Team	Apps	(Gls)
2009	CAL Bariri		
2010–2011	Guaçuano		
2011	Taquaritinga		
2012–2014	Gamba Osaka	0	(0)
2014	→ Kamatamare Sanuki (loan)	27	(5)
2015	Kamatamare Sanuki	36	(5)
2016–2017	Omiya Ardija	18	(1)
2017–2019	Zweigen Kanazawa	83	(1)
2020–2022	FC Ryukyu	100	(4)
2023–2024	Renofa Yamaguchi FC	32	(2)
Medal record
Gamba Osaka
Runner-up	Emperor's Cup	2012
- * Club domestic league appearances and goals as of 14:39, 29 December 2024 (UTC)

Keigo Numata (沼田 圭悟, Numata Keigo; born July 24, 1990) is a Japanese football player.

== Career ==
=== Brazil and Gamba Osaka ===
After graduating from Takasaki City University of Economics High School, Numata moved to Brazil, where he played for CAL Bariri, Guaçuano, and Taquaritinga. He passed the entrance test for Paulista, but was unable to sign for them due to injury, so head coach Wagner Lopes recommended he take the entrance test for Gamba Osaka.

On 8 February 2012, Numata was announced at Gamba Osaka. He made his professional debut in the AFC Champions League on 16 May 2012, in a group stage match against Adelaide United.

=== Omiya Ardija ===
On 22 December 2015, Numata was announced at Omiya Ardija.

=== Zweigen Kanazawa ===
On 12 August 2017, Numata was announced at Zweigen Kanazawa. On 29 December 2018, Numata's contract with the club was extended for the 2019 season.

=== Ryukyu ===
On 23 December 2019, Numata was announced at Ryukyu. On 26 July 2021, it was announced that he had suffered a right distal tibiofibular ligament and an injury to his talar cartilage. During the 2022 season, as the team started to use a three-back formation, Numata was played at wingback instead of fullback. On 6 July 2022, he was injured in a match against Iwate Grulla Morioka. On 27 October 2022, it was announced that the club would not be renewing Numata's contract for the 2023 season.

=== Renofa Yamaguchi ===
On 27 December 2022, Numata was announced at Renofa Yamaguchi. He made his league debut against Omiya Ardija on 18 February 2023. Numata scored his first league goal against V-Varen Nagasaki on 3 June 2023, scoring in the 11th minute. On 5 December 2023, his contract with the club was extended for the 2024 season. On 24 November 2024, it was announced that the club would not be renewing Numata's contract for the 2025 season.

== Club statistics ==
Updated to end of 2018 season.

Club performance			League		Cup		League Cup		Continental		Other		Total	
Season	Club	League	Apps	Goals	Apps	Goals	Apps	Goals	Apps	Goals	Apps	Goals	Apps	Goals
Japan			League		Emperor's Cup		J. League Cup		Asia		Other^{1}		Total	
2012	Gamba Osaka	J1 League	0	0	0	0	0	0	1	0	-		1	0
2013	Gamba Osaka	J2 League	0	0	0	0	-		-		-		0	0
2014	Kamatamare Sanuki	J2 League	27	5	1	0	-		-		2	0	30	5
2015	Kamatamare Sanuki	J2 League	36	5	2	0	-		-		-		38	5
2016	Omiya Ardija	J1 League	17	1	2	0	3	0	-		-		22	1
2017	Omiya Ardija	J1 League	1	0	2	0	1	0	-		-		4	0
2017	Zweigen Kanazawa	J2 League	14	1	-		-		-		-		14	1
2018	Zweigen Kanazawa	J2 League	37	0	1	0	-		-		-		38	0
Total			132	12	8	0	4	0	1	0	2	0	147	12

^{1}Includes Promotion Playoffs to J1.
