= Sanjoanense =

Sanjoanense may refer to:

- A.D. Sanjoanense, Portuguese football club
- CF Sanjoanense (Porto Novo), Capeverdean football club
- Sociedade Esportiva Sanjoanense, Brazilian football club
