= Américo Esporte Clube =

Américo
- Full name: Américo Esporte Clube
- Nickname(s): Águia do Interior
- Founded: September 25, 2007
- Dissolved: 2014
- Ground: Estádio Municipal Joaquim Justo, Américo Brasiliense, São Paulo state, Brazil
- Capacity: 5,000
Home colours	Away colours

Américo Esporte Clube, commonly known as Américo, was a Brazilian football club based in Américo Brasiliense, São Paulo state.

== History ==
The club was founded on September 25, 2007, by the businessman Celso Ferreira de Moura, and professionalized its football department in 2008, competing for the first time in a professional competition in the 2008 Campeonato Paulista Segunda Divisão, when they were eliminated in the Third Stage (Semifinals) of the competition.

== Competition records ==
Year	League	Result	Competition Format
2008	Série B	Eliminated in Semifinals	1st stage: 6 groups of 8; 2nd stage: 4 groups of 6 Semifinals:2 groups of 4 Final: group of 2
2009	Série B	Eliminated in 2nd stage	1st stage: 6 groups of 8; 2nd stage: 6 groups of 4; 3rd stage:3 groups of 4; 4th stage:2 groups of 4; 5th stage: Final
2010	Série B	Eliminated in 2nd stage	1st stage: 6 groups of 8; 2nd stage: 6 groups of 4; 3rd stage:3 groups of 4; 4th stage:2 groups of 4; 5th stage: Final
2011	Série B	Eliminated in 1st stage	1st stage: 6 groups of 8; 2nd stage: 6 groups of 4; 3rd stage:3 groups of 4; 4th stage:2 groups of 4; 5th stage: Final

== Stadium ==
Américo Esporte Clube played their home games at Estádio Municipal Joaquim Justo. The stadium has a maximum capacity of 5,000 people.
