= Éder Paulista =

Brazilian footballer

Personal information
- Full name: Éderson Silva Camillo
- Date of birth: 15 March 1991 (age 35)
- Place of birth: São Paulo, Brazil
- Position: Forward

Youth career
- ECUS

Senior career*
Years	Team	Apps	(Gls)
2008–2011	ECUS		
2011–2012	Velo Clube		
2013	Anapolina		
2014	Velo Clube		
2014	Fernandópolis		
2015	Misto		
2015	Foz do Iguaçu		
2015–2017	Cianorte		
2016	→ CA Itajaí (loan)		
2017	→ Inter de Limeira (loan)		
2018	Inter de Limeira		
2019	Penapolense		
2019	Velo Clube		
2019	Nacional-SP		
2020	Atlético Cajazeirense		
2020	Atibaia		
2021	Nacional-SP		
2021	São Bernardo FC		
2022	Nacional-SP		
2022	Santo André		
2022	São Bento		
2023	ASA		
2023	Taubaté		
2023	São Bento		
- * Club domestic league appearances and goals

Éderson Silva Camillo (born 15 March 1991), better known as Éder Paulista, is a Brazilian former professional footballer who played as a forward.

== Career ==
A center forward, Éder began his career at ECUS in Suzano, in 2008, at the age of 17. He had spells at Velo Clube and Anapolina, where he was part of the second division champion squad in Goiás in 2013. In 2016 he won titles again, with Cianorte in the second division of Paraná, and with CA Itajaí, where he was part of the squad that won the Catarinense Série C.

In football in São Paulo, he had interesting passages in the Campeonato Paulista Série A3, being runner-up with Inter de Limeira in 2017, and top scorer in the competition for Nacional in 2021.

On 26 October 2022 he signed with ASA to compete in the 2023 Campeonato Alagoano. On 14 February 2023, he signed with Taubaté, which competed in the Campeonato Paulista Série A2. In May 2023, he signed another move to São Bento, the last professional team of his career.

== Honours ==
Anapolina

- Campeonato Goiano Second Division: 2013

Cianorte

- Campeonato Paranaense Série Prata: 2016

CA Itajaí

- Campeonato Catarinense Série C: 2016

São Bernardo FC

- Copa Paulista: 2021

Individual

- 2021 Campeonato Paulista Série A3 top scorer: 13 goals
