= Silas Brindeiro =

Brazilian footballer

Personal information
- Full name: Silas dos Santos Brindeiro
- Date of birth: 14 July 1987
- Place of birth: Santarém, Brazil
- Date of death: 25 September 2018 (aged 31)
- Place of death: São Paulo, Brazil
- Height: 1.90 m (6 ft 3 in)
- Position: Forward

Senior career*
Years	Team	Apps	(Gls)
2007	São José-AP		
2007	Mogi Mirim		
2008	Sete de Setembro-PE		
2008	Petrolina		
2008	Afogadense		
2009–2010	Trofense		
2009	→ Ribeirão (loan)		
2009	→ Vera Cruz (loan)		
2011	Grasshoppers		
2011	Náutico		
2011	Campinense		
2012–2015	Capivariano		
2012	→ Brasiliense (loan)		
2013	→ Cuiabá (loan)		
2014	→ Guarani (loan)		
2016	Penapolense		
2017	São Francisco-PA		
- * Club domestic league appearances and goals as of 14 April 2024

Silas dos Santos Brindeiro (14 July 1987 – 25 September 2018), better known as Silas Brindeiro, was a Brazilian professional footballer who played as a forward.

== Career ==
Silas Brindeiro started his career at São José do Amapá, and later played for teams from Pernambuco, Portugal, Grasshoppers from Switzerland and São Paulo. He was part of the state champion squads in 2013 with Cuiabá, and in the Paulista Série A2 with Capivariano.

== Honours ==
Cuiabá

- Campeonato Mato-Grossense: 2013

Capivariano

- Campeonato Paulista Série A2: 2014

Individual

- 2012 Campeonato Paulista Série A3 top scorer: 15 goals

== Death ==
Silas Brindeiro died of Leukemia on 25 September 2018, at the Brazilian Institute for Cancer Control (IBCC), in São Paulo. He was diagnosed with leukemia in 2014 and after treatments, he was cleared to return to playing football professionally. In 2017, it was announced by São Francisco, but tests carried out days before revealed that the leukemia had returned and the player needed to resume treatments in Brasília.
