= Jacareí Atlético Clube =

Jacareí
- Full name: Jacareí Atlético Clube
- Nickname(s): Tricolor do Vale; JAC
- Founded: October 27, 1980
- Ground: Estádio Stravos Papadopoulos
- Capacity: 4,090
Home colours	Away colours

Jacareí Atlético Clube, commonly known as Jacareí, is a currently inactive Brazilian football club based in Jacareí, São Paulo state.

== History ==
The club was founded on October 27, 1980, after a suggestion broadcast by Rádio Clube Jacareí. They won the Campeonato Paulista Série A3 in 1988.

== Achievements ==
- Campeonato Paulista Série A3:
  - Winners (1): 1988

== Stadium ==
Jacareí Atlético Clube play their home games at Estádio Stravos Papadopoulos. The stadium has a maximum capacity of 4,200 people.
