= Sociedade Esportiva Sanjoanense =

Sanjoanense
- Full name: Sociedade Esportiva Sanjoanense
- Nickname(s): Tiger of Mogiana; Tiva
- Founded: 1 July 1916; 109 years ago
- Ground: Oscar de Andrade Nogueira
- Capacity: 2,000
- President: José Carlos Mistura
- Website: https://ses.com.br/
Home colors	Away colors

Sociedade Esportiva Sanjoanense, simply known as Sanjoanense, is a Brazilian inactive professional football club based in São João da Boa Vista, São Paulo.

== History ==
Founded in 1916 by the merge of AA São João and SFC Sanjoanense, SE Sanjoanense competed in the APEA countryside championship on several occasions, during the amateur era of football. As a professional club, it played in the first editions of the second division in the 40s, and later in the third division during the 80s, being champion of the 1987 edition alongside Palmital Atlético Clube. In 1988, made its last appearance as a professional football club, continuing its activities only as a social club, no longer affiliated with FPF.

== Rivalries ==
Sanjoanense has a rival in the city, Palmeiras Futebol Clube, also inactive in professional football. Also rivaled the AA Pinhalense of Espirito Santo do Pinhal, the neighboring city.

== Honours ==
- Campeonato Paulista Série A3
  - Winners: 1987 (shared)
