= Palmital Atlético Clube =

Palmital
- Full name: Palmital Atlético Clube
- Founded: 19 December 1929; 95 years ago
- Ground: Estádio Miguel Assad Taraia
Home colors	Away colors

Palmital Atlético Clube, simply known as Palmital, is a Brazilian football club based in Palmital, São Paulo.

== History ==
Founded on 19 December 1929 as Operário Atlético Clube, Palmital competed in professional competitions in São Paulo from 1960 until the mid-90s, with the highlight being the Série A3 title in 1987. Currently the club is outside professional football, no longer affiliated with the FPF.

== Honours ==
- Campeonato Paulista Série A3
  - Winners: 1987
