= Taquarão =

Multi-use stadium in Taquaritinga, Brazil

Coordinates: 21.3998°S 48.4936°W

Estádio Municipal Adail Nunes da Silva
- Taquarão
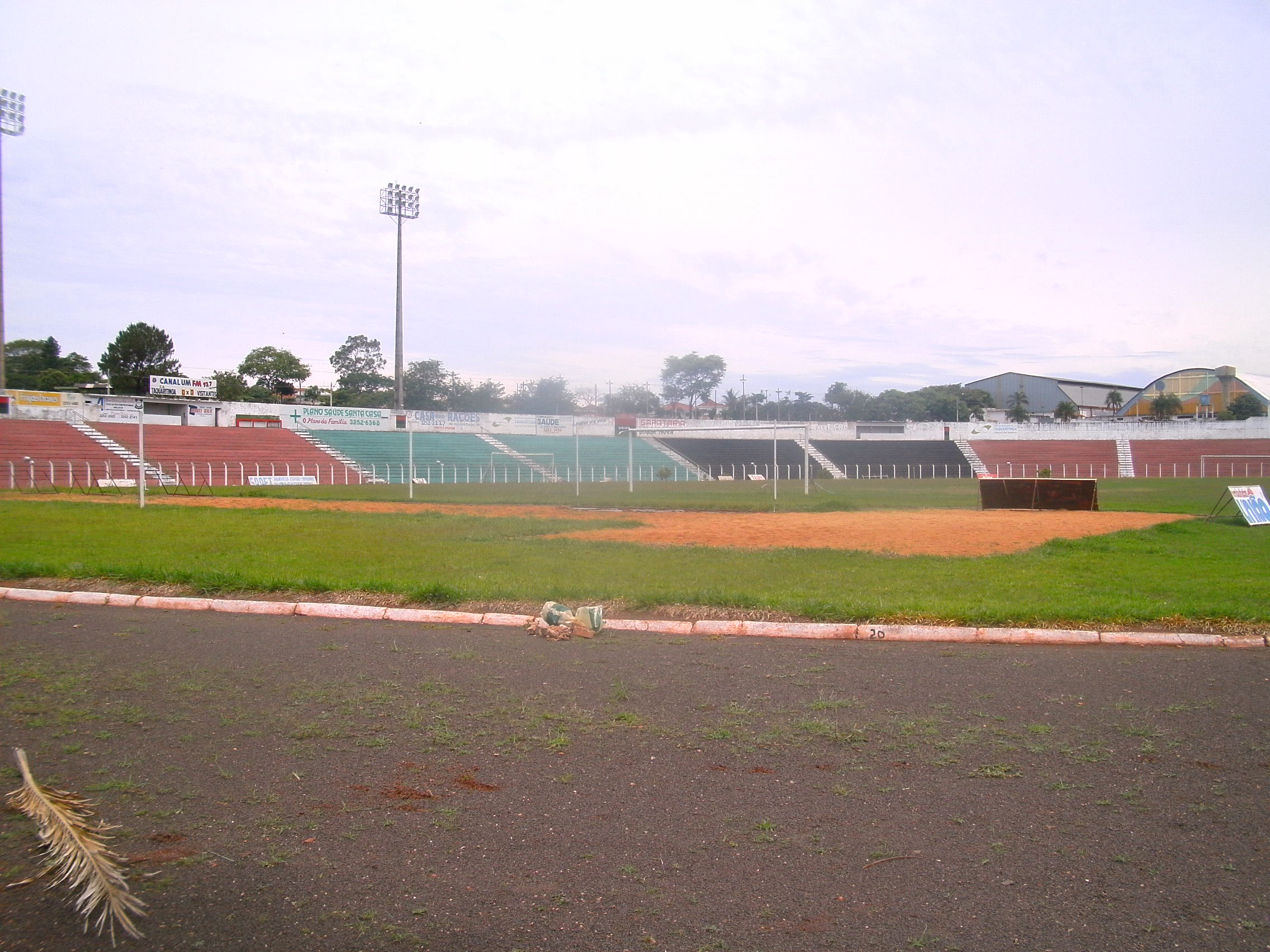
- Interactive map of Estádio Municipal Adail Nunes da Silva
- Location: Taquaritinga, São Paulo state, Brazil
- Owner: Taquaritinga City Hall
- Capacity: 18,805
- Surface: Natural grass
- Field size: 105 by 68 metres (114.8 yd × 74.4 yd)

Construction
- Opened: 1983

Tenant
- Taquaritinga

Estádio Municipal Adail Nunes da Silva, usually known by its nickname Taquarão, is a multi-use stadium in Taquaritinga, Brazil. It is currently used mostly for football matches. The stadium has a capacity of 18,805 people. It was built in 1983.

The Taquarão is owned by the Taquaritinga City Hall. The stadium is named after Adail Nunes da Silva, who was Taquaritinga city's mayor four times.

== History ==
In 1982, Taquaritinga was promoted to the Campeonato Paulista first division, but the club's stadium was not eligible to be used in the competition. So, the club requested to the city hall a new stadium. After just three months, the stadium was built.

In 1983, the works on Taquarão were completed. The inaugural match was played on May 1 of that year, when Taquaritinga beat Cruzeiro 5-2. The first goal of the stadium was scored by Cruzeiro's Douglas Onça.

The stadium's attendance record currently stands at 25,000, set on June 10, 1983 when Taquaritinga beat Corinthians 2-0.
