= Adamantina =

Municipality in Brazil

- Municipality
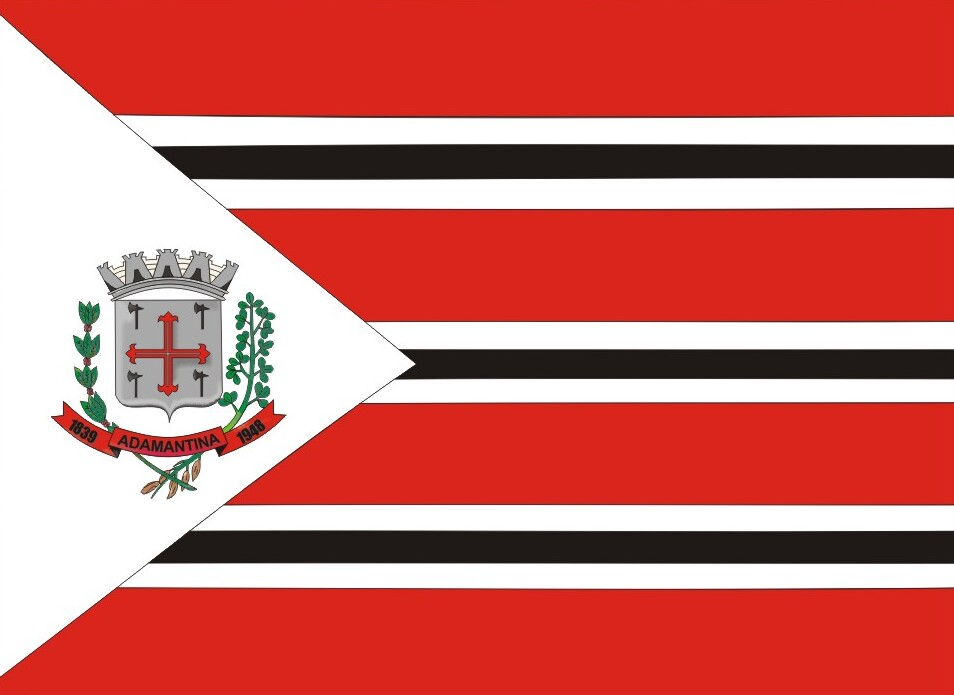
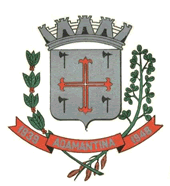
- Flag Coat of arms

- Location in São Paulo state

- Location in Brazil
- Coordinates: 21°41′5″S 51°4′24″W
- Country: Brazil
- Region: Southeast
- State: São Paulo
- Mesoregion: Presidente Prudente
- Microregion: Adamantina

Government
  - Mayor: Ivo Francisco dos Santos Júnior

Area
  - Total: 412.0 km^{2} (159.1 sq mi)
- Elevation: 401 m (1,316 ft)

Population (2020)
  - Total: 35,111
  - Density: 85.22/km^{2} (220.7/sq mi)
- Time zone: UTC-03:00 (BRT)
  - Summer (DST): UTC-02:00 (BRST)
- Postal code: 17800-000
- Area code: 18
- Website: www.adamantina.sp.gov.br

Adamantina is a municipality in the state of São Paulo, Brazil. The population is 35,111 (2020 est.) in an area of 412.0 km^{2}.

== History ==
The municipality was created by state law in 1948.

Map of the state of São Paulo (1948).

== Demographics ==
Historical population (municipality)
Year	Population	%±
1950	35,223	—
1960	34,206	−2.9%
1970	31,798	−7.0%
1980	32,049	0.8%
1991	32,091	0.1%
2000	33,497	4.4%
2010	33,797	0.9%
2022	34,687	2.6%

=== Population ===
Census 2000:

- Total resident : 33,497
- Males: 16,321
- Female: 17,176
- Urban: 30,368 (90.66%)
- Agricultural: 3,129 (9.34%)

Resident population of 10 years or more

- Total: 28.808

== Infrastructure ==
- Hospitals: 2
- Bank agencies: 9
- Industries: 67
- Commercial Establishments: 279
- Services: 161
- Important places: FAI - Faculdades Adamantinenses Integradas, ETEC "Prof. Eudécio Luiz Vicente", EEPSG "Profª Fleurides Cavallini Menechino", EEPSG "Helen Keller", EEPSG "Durvalino Grion", EEPG "Navarro de Andrade", ACE - Associação Empresarial e Comercial de Adamantina, Recinto Poli Esportivo de Adamantina, Parque dos Pioneiros.

== Media ==
In telecommunications, the city was served by Telecomunicações de São Paulo. In July 1998, this company was acquired by Telefónica, which adopted the Vivo brand in 2012.

The company is currently an operator of cell phones, fixed lines, internet (fiber optics/4G) and television (satellite and cable).

== Religion ==
Christianity is present in the city as follows:

=== Catholic Church ===
The Catholic church in the municipality is part of the Roman Catholic Diocese of Marília.

=== Protestant Church ===
The most diverse evangelical beliefs are present in the city, mainly Pentecostal, including the Assemblies of God in Brazil (the largest evangelical church in the country), Christian Congregation in Brazil, among others. These denominations are growing more and more throughout Brazil.

== Climate ==
Climate data for Adamantina, elevation 402 m (1,319 ft), (1993–2020)
Month	Jan	Feb	Mar	Apr	May	Jun	Jul	Aug	Sep	Oct	Nov	Dec	Year
Mean daily maximum °C (°F)	31.5 (88.7)	31.7 (89.1)	31.5 (88.7)	30.6 (87.1)	27.3 (81.1)	26.7 (80.1)	27.4 (81.3)	29.8 (85.6)	30.9 (87.6)	31.7 (89.1)	31.8 (89.2)	32.1 (89.8)	30.3 (86.5)
Daily mean °C (°F)	26.0 (78.8)	26.2 (79.2)	25.7 (78.3)	24.3 (75.7)	20.9 (69.6)	20.2 (68.4)	20.4 (68.7)	22.1 (71.8)	23.6 (74.5)	25.0 (77.0)	25.6 (78.1)	26.2 (79.2)	23.8 (74.9)
Mean daily minimum °C (°F)	20.6 (69.1)	20.7 (69.3)	19.8 (67.6)	18.0 (64.4)	14.6 (58.3)	13.7 (56.7)	13.3 (55.9)	14.5 (58.1)	16.3 (61.3)	18.4 (65.1)	19.4 (66.9)	20.3 (68.5)	17.5 (63.4)
Average precipitation mm (inches)	236.1 (9.30)	167.4 (6.59)	129.9 (5.11)	60.5 (2.38)	68.2 (2.69)	49.9 (1.96)	39.6 (1.56)	34.2 (1.35)	76.6 (3.02)	90.4 (3.56)	119.2 (4.69)	193.3 (7.61)	1,265.3 (49.82)
Average precipitation days (≥ 1.0 mm)	17.1	14.0	12.1	6.5	6.4	5.5	4.0	3.4	6.6	9.1	10.5	14.6	109.8
Source: Centro Integrado de Informações Agrometeorológicas

== See also ==
- List of municipalities in São Paulo
- Interior of São Paulo
