= Tanabi Esporte Clube =

Brazilian football club

Tanabi
- Full name: Tanabi Esporte Clube
- Nicknames: TEC; Tecão; Índio da Noroeste
- Founded: December 18, 1942 (83 years ago)
- Ground: Estádio Pref. Alberto Victolo
- Capacity: 15,200
- League: Campeonato Paulista Série A4
- 2025: Paulista Segunda Divisão, 1st of 15 (champions)
Home colors	Away colors

Tanabi Esporte Clube, or simply Tanabi, is a Brazilian football team based in Tanabi, São Paulo. Founded in 1942, it plays in Campeonato Paulista Segunda Divisão.

The club is nicknamed Índio da Noroeste.

== History ==
Tanabi was founded on December 18, 1942. They won the Campeonato Paulista Série A3 in 1956.

== Honours ==
- Campeonato Paulista Série A3
  - Winners (1): 1956
- Campeonato Paulista Segunda Divisão
  - Winners (1): 2025

== Stadium ==
The club plays its home games at Estádio Alberto Víctolo, usually called Albertão, which has a maximum capacity of 15,200.

== Colors ==
They play in green shirts, white shorts and green socks.

== See also ==
- Federação Paulista de Futebol
- List of football clubs in Brazil
