= Ituverava =

- Municipality
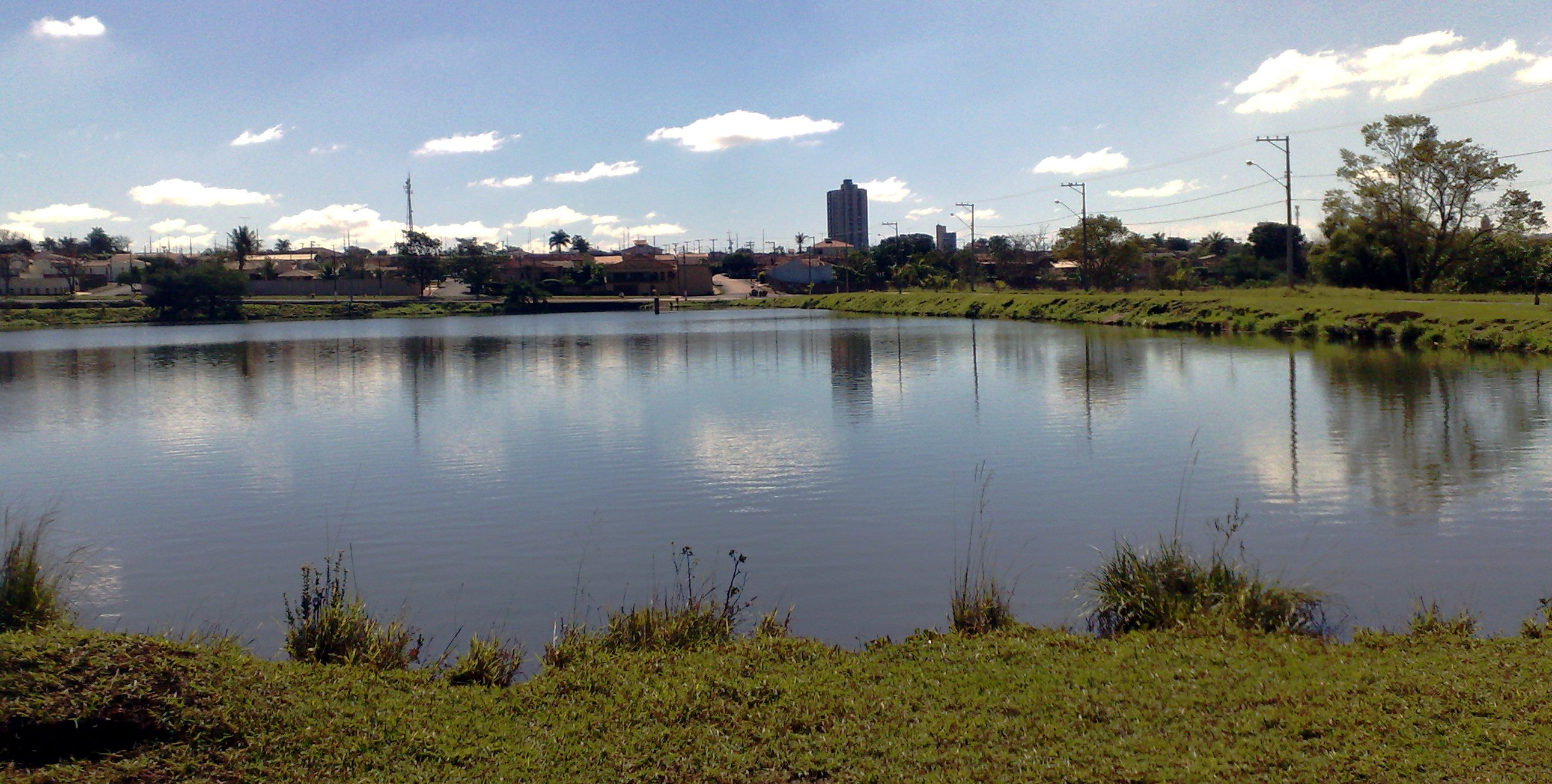

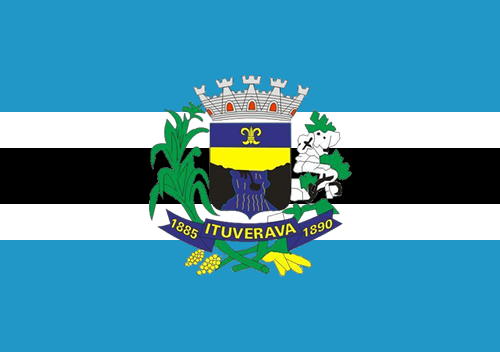
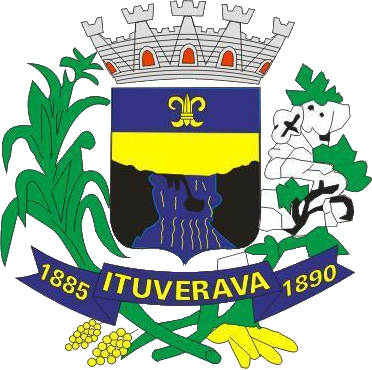
- Flag Coat of arms

- Location in São Paulo state

- Location in Brazil
- Coordinates: 20°30′22″S 47°46′50″W
- Country: Brazil
- Region: Southeast
- State: São Paulo

Area
  - Total: 705 km^{2} (272 sq mi)

Population (2022)
  - Total: 37.571
  - Density: 0.0533/km^{2} (0.138/sq mi)
- Time zone: UTC−3 (BRT)

Ituverava is a city located in the São Paulo state, in Brazil. The population is 37.571 (2022 est.) in an area of 705 km^{2}.

== Geography ==
It is located in the north region of São Paulo state, at a distance of 410 km from the capital of São Paulo State, and with an altitude of 605 meters.

== Economy ==
The economy is predominantly agricultural, based on the cultivation of sugar cane. As a micro region polo, it has a relative strong trade and advanced service sector mainly based on medicine services.

The industrial sector has changed a little during the last decades as the cotton and soybeans crops had gone to agricultural frontiers as Mato Grosso and Goias and the sugarcane reconfigured the north of São Paulo. The agriculture raw material transformation industry that had gone with the soybeans and cotton crops (Maeda) gave place to some consumption and chemicals industries (Santa Maria, of Rubinho, Vittia, of Wilsinho, Vasbrás, of Marquin Jacinto and UPL).

== History ==
The town was founded in the beginning of the 19th century, and grew around a chapel dedicated to Our Lady of Mount Carmel (Nossa Senhora do Carmo). In 1847 it became a district of the municipality Franca, under the name Carmo de Franca. It became an independent municipality in 1885. In 1899 the name was changed to Ituverava, which is Tupi for "shining waterfall".

== See also ==
- List of municipalities in São Paulo
