= Associação Esportiva Santacruzense =

Santacruzense
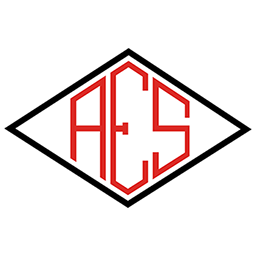
- Full name: Associação Esportiva Santacruzense
- Nickname(s): AES; Tricolor Santacruzense; Esportiva
- Founded: 25 January 1931 (94 years ago)
- Ground: Estádio Deputado Leônidas Camarinha
- Capacity: 15,000
- 2023: Paulista Segunda Divisão, 35th of 36
- Website: www.esportivasantacruz.com.br
Home colors	Away colors

Associação Esportiva Santacruzense, more commonly referred to as Santacruzense, is a Brazilian football club based in Santa Cruz do Rio Pardo, São Paulo.

== History ==
The club was founded on 25 January 1931, by a group of local amateur athletes, professionalizing in 1954. They won the Campeonato Paulista Série A3 in 1962.

== Achievements ==
- Campeonato Paulista Série A3:
  - Winners (1): 1962

== Stadium ==
Associação Esportiva Santacruzense play their home games at Estádio Municipal Leônidas Camarinha. The stadium has a maximum capacity of 15,000 people.
