= Garça =

- Municipality
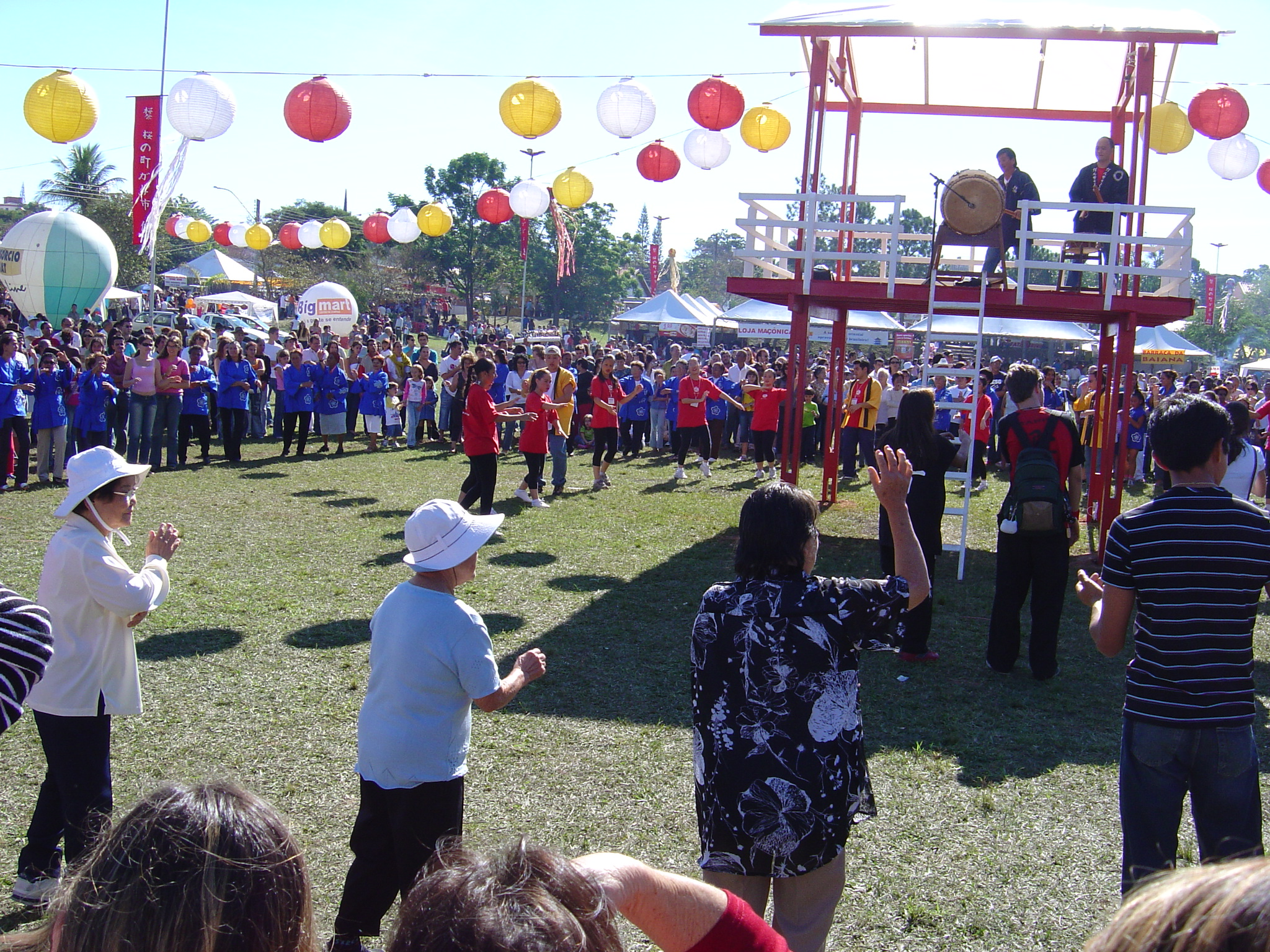
- The Festival das Cerejeiras, a party of Japanese culture with cherry trees flowers, bringing around 120.000 visitors each year.

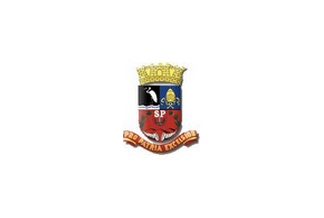
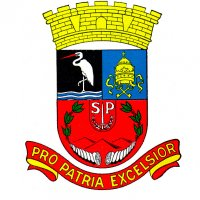
- Flag Coat of arms

- Location in São Paulo state

- Location in Brazil
- Coordinates: 22°12′55″S 49°39′4″W
- Country: Brazil
- Region: Southeast
- State: São Paulo

Area
  - Total: 556 km^{2} (215 sq mi)

Population (2020)
  - Total: 44,409
  - Density: 79.9/km^{2} (207/sq mi)
- Time zone: UTC-03:00 (BRT)
  - Summer (DST): UTC-02:00 (BRST)

Garça is a town located in the west-central part of the state of São Paulo, Brazil. The population is 44,409 (2020 est.) in an area of 556 km^{2}.

Established on October 4, 1924, it was one of the cities that had been part of the coffee circle, in the beginning of the 20th century. Garça is known for its coffee plantations, the iron line city and by the Cerejeiras Festival ("cherry tree festival") that takes place every year. The average altitude is 663 m (2,175 ft) above sea level.

== Geography ==
=== Climate ===
The climate is subtropical with temperatures ranging from 17.8 °C to 28.5 °C. The precipitation is 1.274,4 mm/a. The rainy season occurs in the summer (December until March), with the temperature hovering between 25 and 30 °C. Low temperatures occur in the months of April and July.

=== Topography ===
Garça is situated in a landscape of rolling hills, where many small streams are formed, converging all to the formation of the rivers Rio do Peixe, Tibiriça and Feio.

=== Soil types ===
- Podzol, Marília Variation

=== Vegetation ===
The region is characterized by lush vegetation, predominantly grassy, while the native vegetation was primarily tropical forest.

== Media ==
In telecommunications, the city was served by Companhia Telefônica Brasileira until 1973, when it began to be served by Telecomunicações de São Paulo. In July 1998, this company was acquired by Telefónica, which adopted the Vivo brand in 2012.

The company is currently an operator of cell phones, fixed lines, internet (fiber optics/4G) and television (satellite and cable).

== Religion ==
Christianity is present in the city as follows:

=== Catholic Church ===
The Catholic church in the municipality is part of the Roman Catholic Diocese of Marília.

=== Protestant Church ===
The most diverse evangelical beliefs are present in the city, mainly Pentecostal, including the Assemblies of God in Brazil (the largest evangelical church in the country), Christian Congregation in Brazil, among others. These denominations are growing more and more throughout Brazil.

== Notable people ==
- Roberto Carlos, football player.
- Valdir Peres, football player.

== See also ==
- List of municipalities in São Paulo
