= Clube Atlético Guaçuano =

Guaçuano
- Full name: Clube Atlético Guaçuano
- Nicknames: Mandi; Alvi-verde
- Founded: February 26, 1929
- Ground: Estádio Municipal Alexandre Augusto Camacho, Mogi Guaçu, São Paulo state, Brazil
- Capacity: 5,594
Home colours	Away colours

Clube Atlético Guaçuano, commonly known as Guaçuano, is a Brazilian football club based in Mogi Guaçu, São Paulo state.

== History ==
The club was founded on February 26, 1929. They competed for the first time in a professional competition in 1975, when they participated in the Campeonato Paulista Série A3, replacing Grêmio Guaçuano.

== Stadium ==
Clube Atlético Guaçuano play their home games at Estádio Municipal Alexandre Augusto Camacho. The stadium has a maximum capacity of 5,594 people.
