= Américo Brasiliense =

Municipality in the state of São Paulo in Brazil

- Municipality
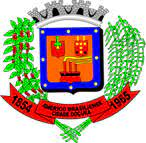
- Flag Coat of arms

- Location in São Paulo state

- Location in Brazil
- Coordinates: 21°44′10″S 48°6′41″W
- Country: Brazil
- Region: Southeast
- State: São Paulo

Area
  - Total: 123 km^{2} (47 sq mi)

Population (2020)
  - Total: 41,032
  - Density: 334/km^{2} (864/sq mi)
- Time zone: UTC−3 (BRT)

Américo Brasiliense is a Brazilian municipality in the state of São Paulo. The population is 41,032 (2020 est.) in an area of 123 km^{2} (47 sq mi).

This city is also known as Cidade Doçura ("sweetness city"), because its perimeter is surrounded by sugar cane plantations that form the basis for its economy. This is supported by cheap labor from emigrants from northeastern states, mainly from Bahia.

== Demographics ==
Historical population (municipality)
Year	Population	%±
1970	5,368	—
1980	11,864	121.0%
1991	20,067	69.1%
2000	28,287	41.0%
2010	34,478	21.9%
2022	33,019	−4.2%
Est. 2024	33,757	2.2%

== Media ==
In telecommunications, the city was served by Companhia Telefônica Brasileira until 1973, when it began to be served by Telecomunicações de São Paulo. In July 1998, this company was acquired by Telefónica, which adopted the Vivo brand in 2012.

The company is currently an operator of cell phones, fixed lines, internet (fiber optics/4G) and television (satellite and cable).

== See also ==
- List of municipalities in the state of São Paulo by population
- Interior of São Paulo
