= Neves Paulista =

- Municipality
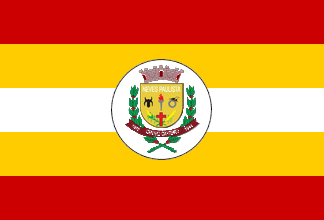
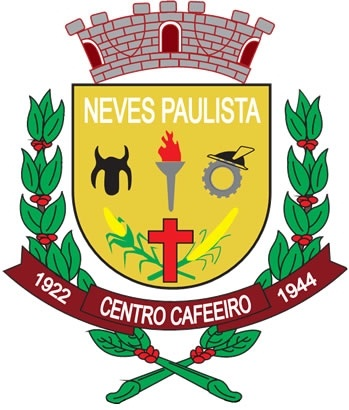
- Flag Coat of arms

- Location of Neves Paulista

- Location within Brazil
- Coordinates: 20°50′45″S 49°37′48″W
- Country: Brazil
- Region: Southeast
- State: São Paulo
- Established: 2009

Area
  - Total: 218.3 km^{2} (84.3 sq mi)
- Elevation: 549 m (1,801 ft)

Population (2020)
  - Total: 8,923
  - Density: 40.2/km^{2} (104/sq mi)
- Time zone: UTC−3 (BRT)
- Postal Code: 15120-000
- Area code: +55 17
- Website: Prefecture of Neves Paulista

Neves Paulista is a municipality in the state of São Paulo, Brazil. The city has a population of 8,923 inhabitants and an area of 218.3 km^{2} (84.3 sq mi).

Neves Paulista belongs to the Mesoregion of São José do Rio Preto.

== History ==
The municipality was created by state law in 1944.

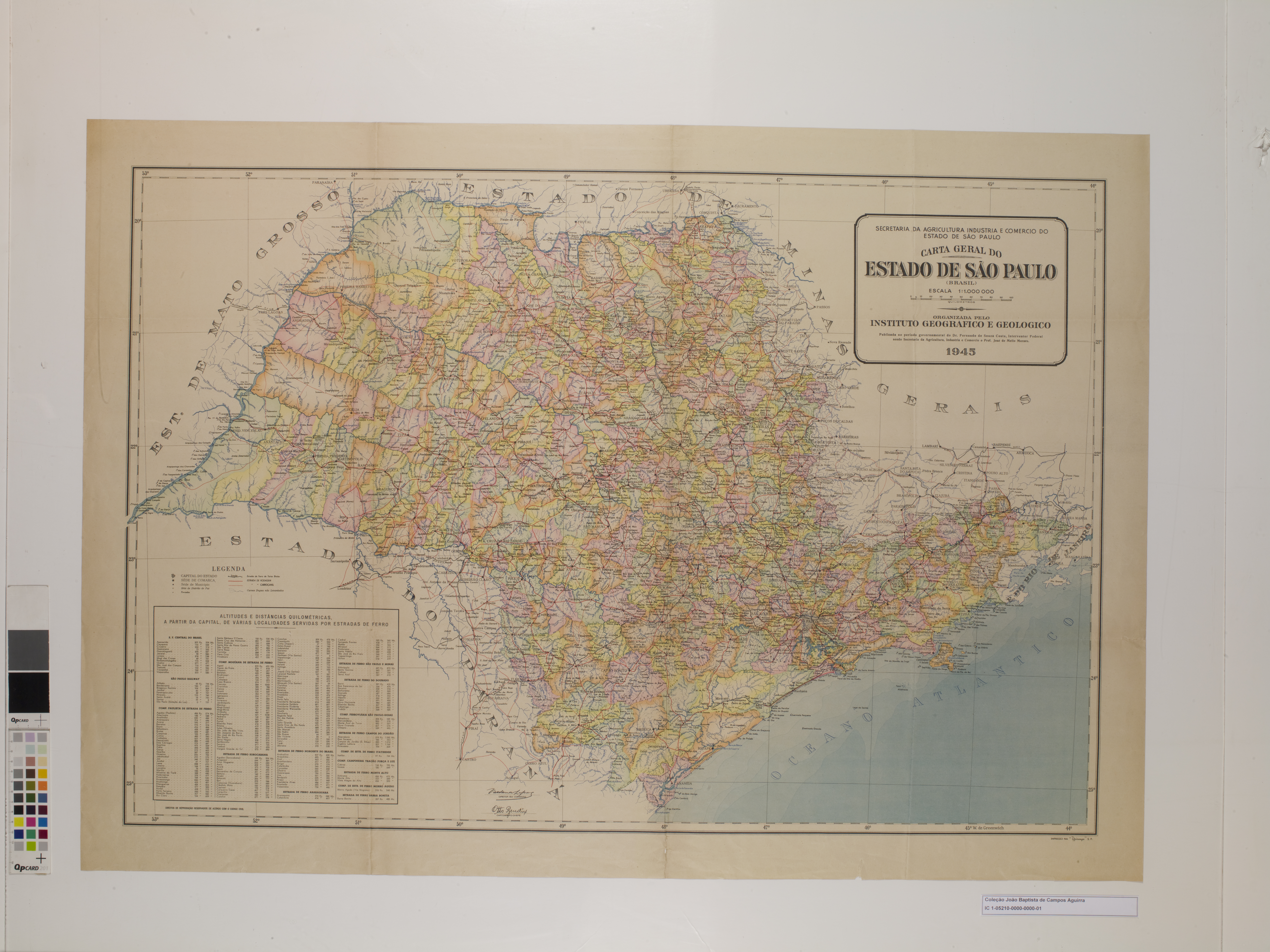
Map of the state of São Paulo (1944).

== Media ==
In telecommunications, the city was served by Telecomunicações de São Paulo. In July 1998, this company was acquired by Telefónica, which adopted the Vivo brand in 2012. The company is currently an operator of cell phones, fixed lines, internet (fiber optics/4G) and television (satellite and cable).

== See also ==
- List of municipalities in São Paulo
- Interior of São Paulo
