= Clube Atlético Lençoense =

Lençoense
- Full name: Clube Atlético Lençoense
- Nickname: CAL
- Founded: December 16, 1943
- Ground: Estádio Municipal Archangelo Brega
- Capacity: 5,242
Home colours	Away colours

Clube Atlético Lençoense, commonly known as Lençoense, is a currently inactive Brazilian football club based in Lençóis Paulista, São Paulo state.

== History ==
The club was founded on December 12, 1943, as Clube Atlético Lençoense, in Lençois Paulista. They won the Campeonato Paulista Série A3 in 1983. It was renamed to Clube Atlético Lençoense/Bariri in 2009, after moving to Bariri due to political problems with the city hall of Lençóis Paulista.

== Achievements ==
- Campeonato Paulista Série A3:
  - Winners (1): 1983

== Stadium ==
Clube Atlético Lençoenseplay their home games at Estádio Municipal Archangelo Brega, which as a maximum capacity of 5,242 people.
