= Espírito Santo do Pinhal =

Municipality in the state of São Paulo in Brazil

- Municipality
- Municipality of Espírito Santo do Pinhal
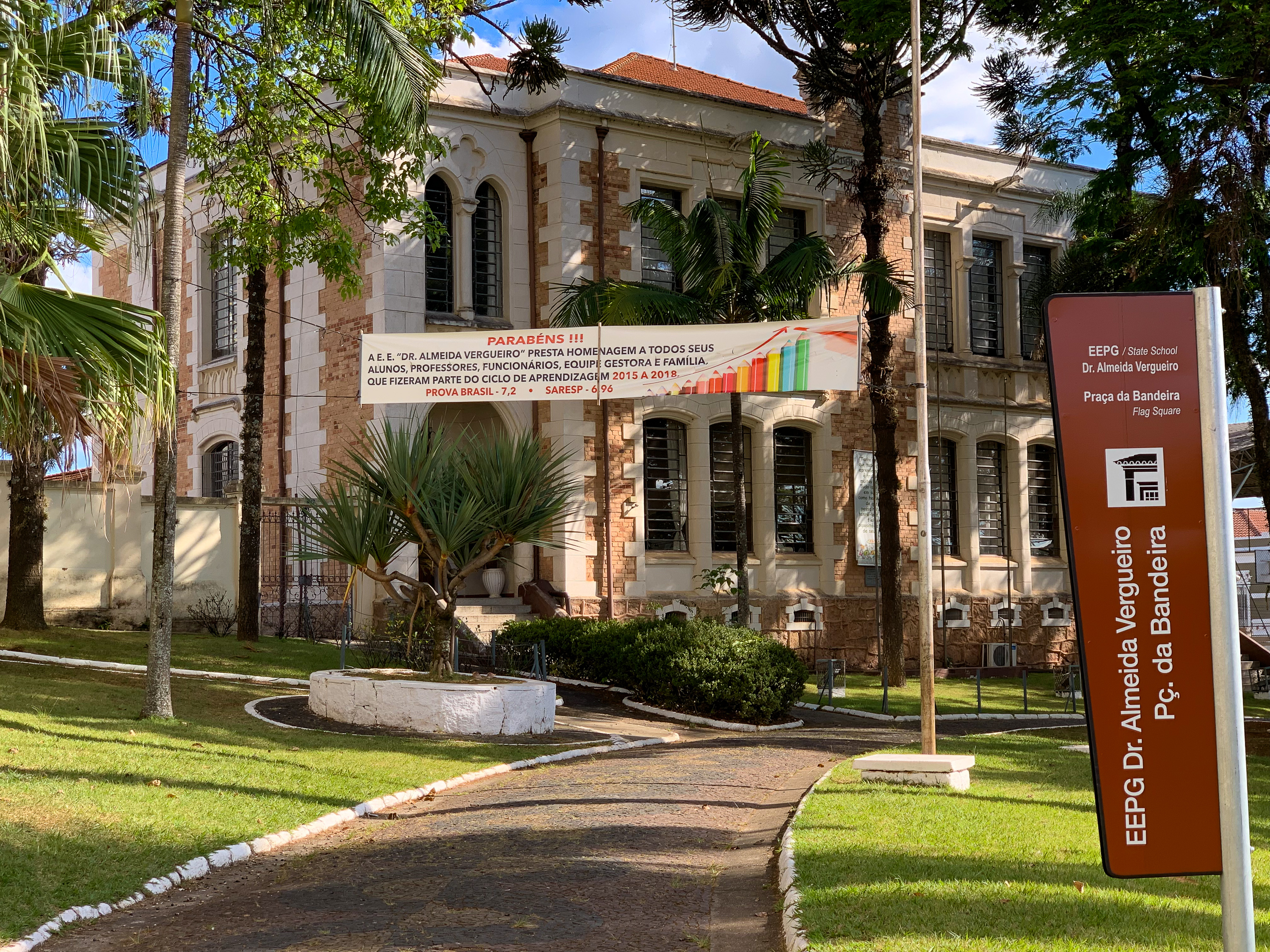
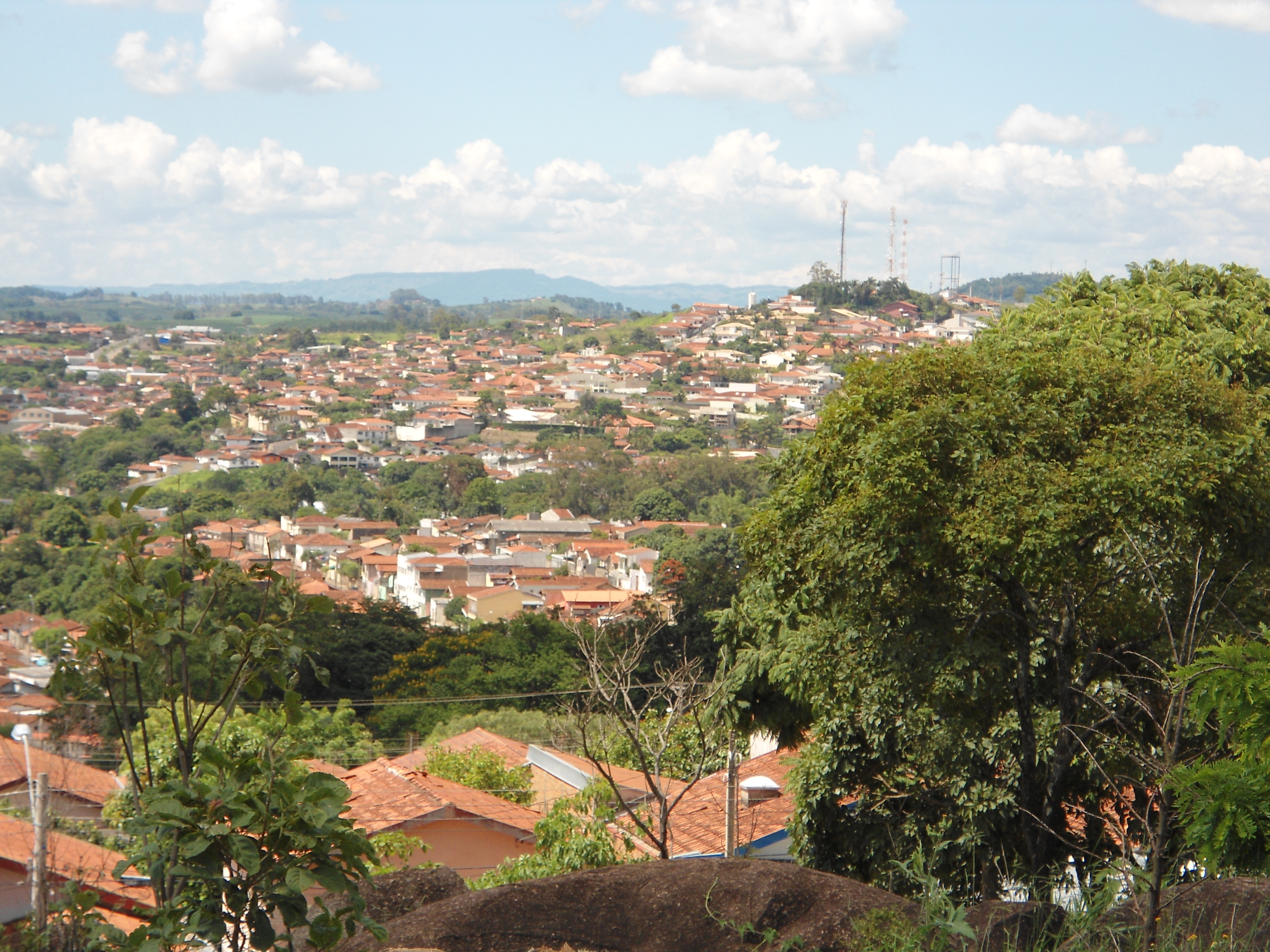
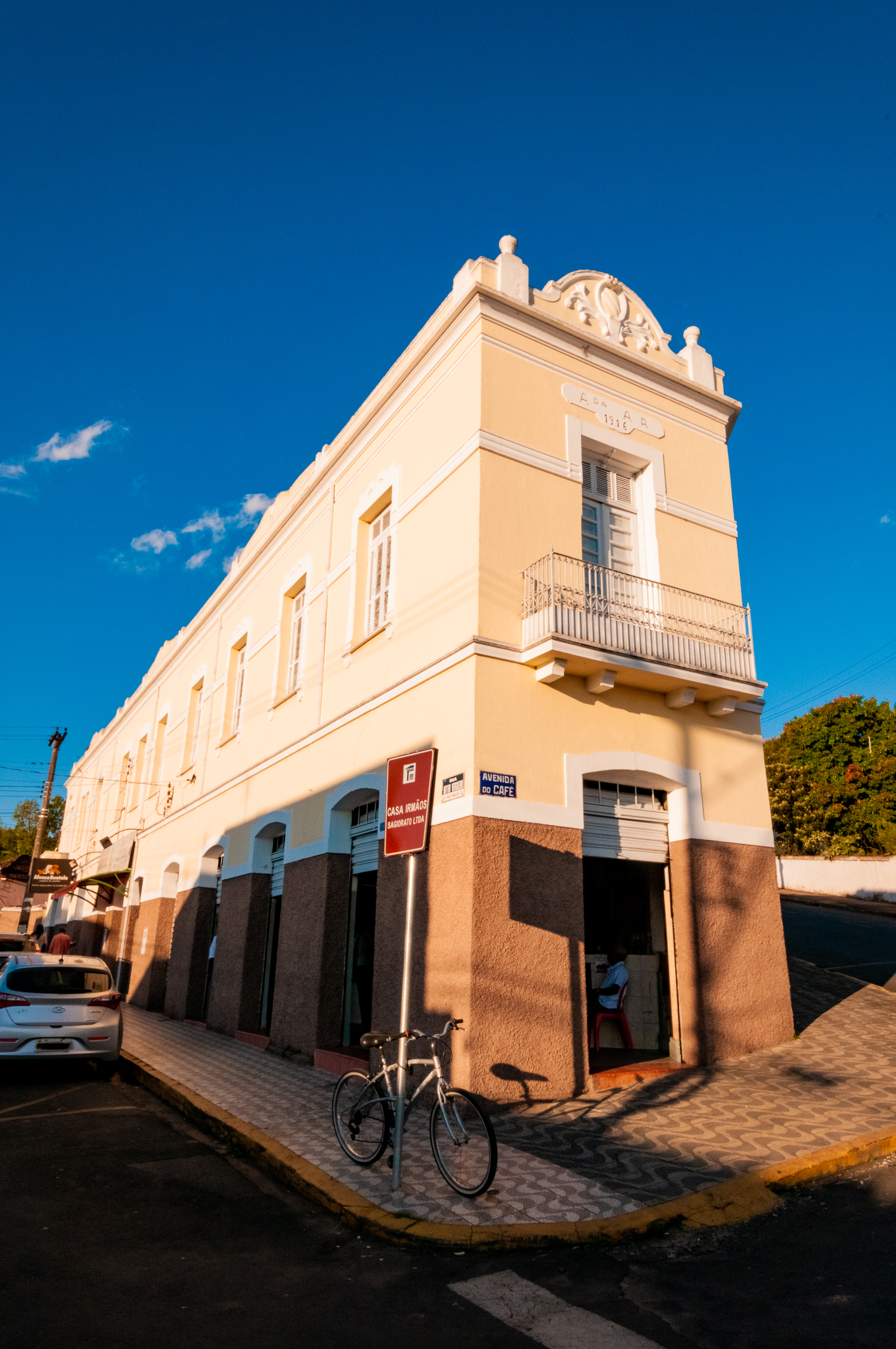
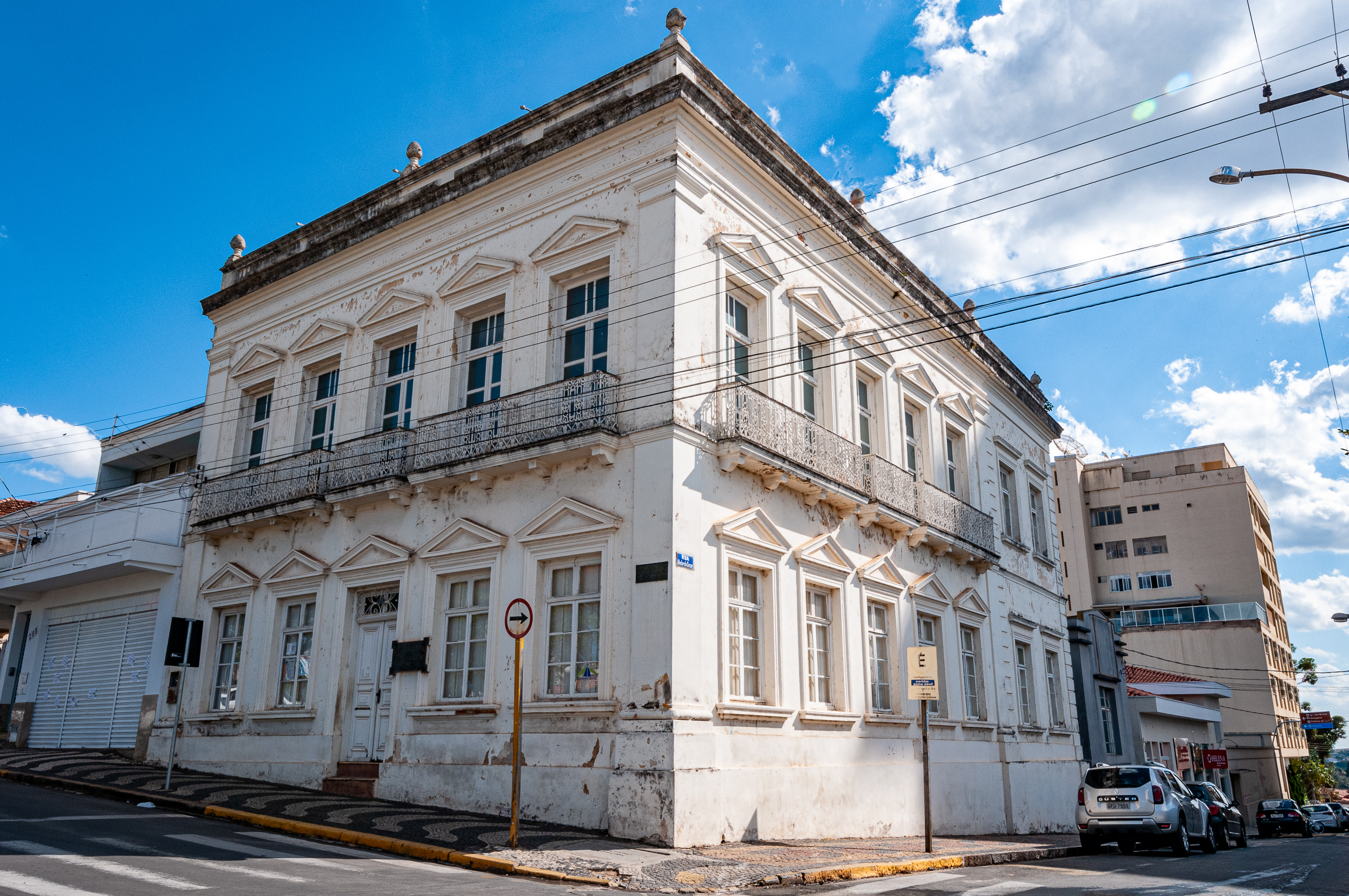
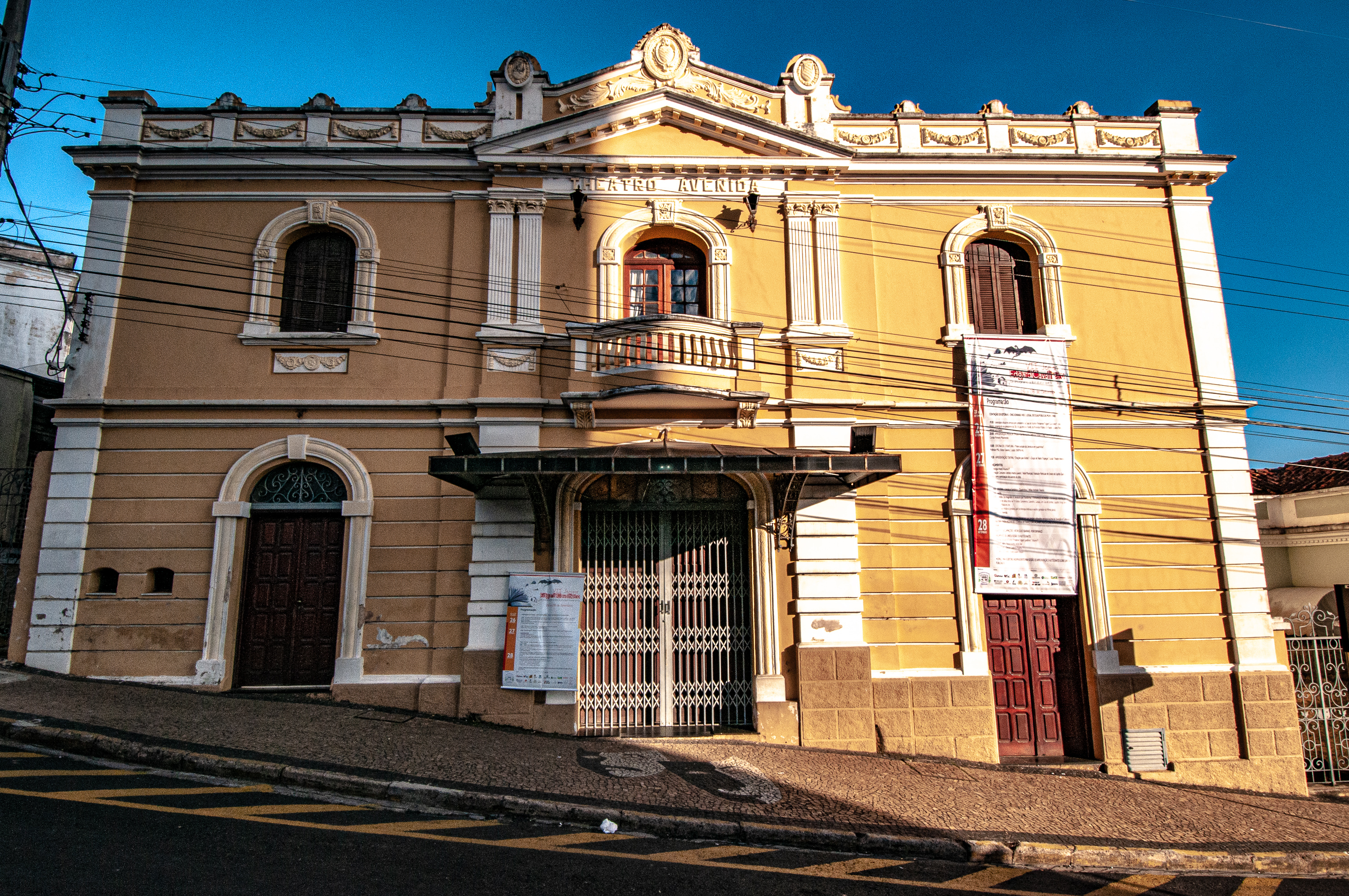
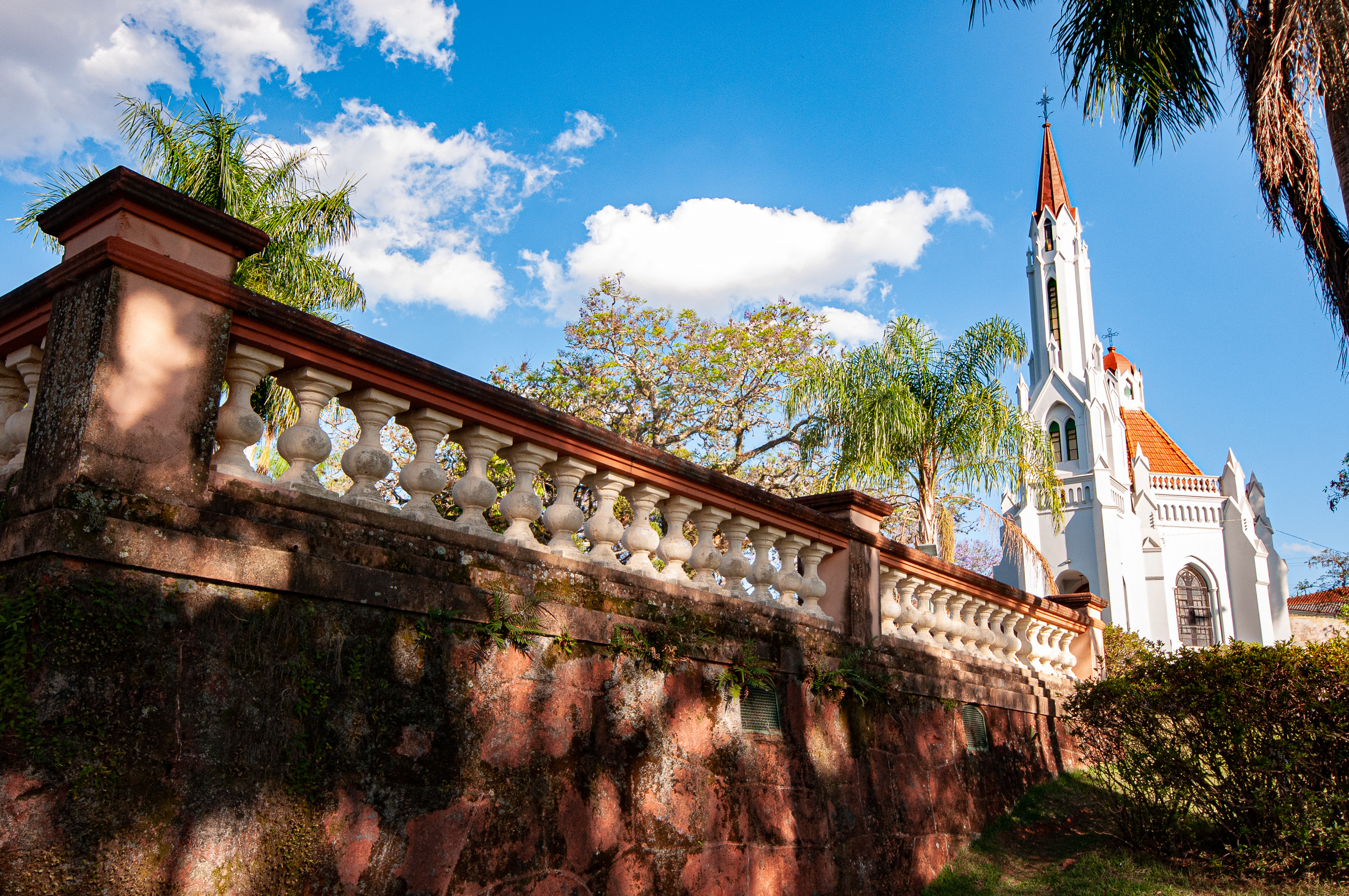

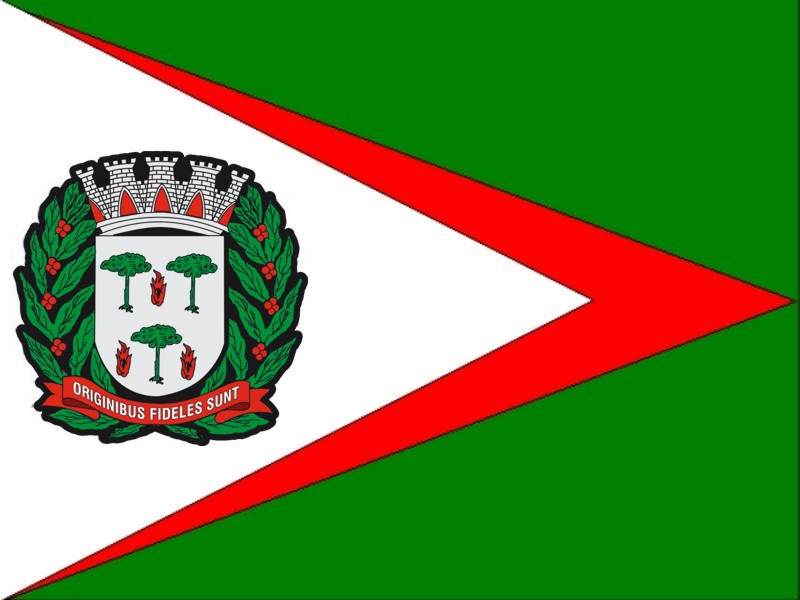
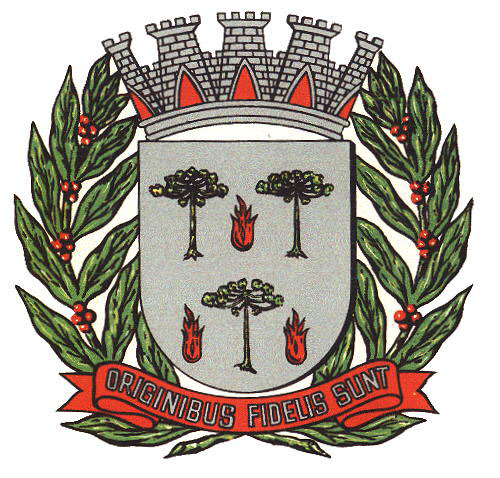
- Flag Coat of arms
- Nickname: Pinhal
- Location in São Paulo
- Coordinates: 22°11′27″S 46°44′27″W
- Country: Brazil
- Region: Southeast
- State: São Paulo
- Founded: December 27, 1849

Government
  - Mayor: Sérgio del Bianchi Junior (2025 - 2028) (PSD)

Area
  - Total: 389 km^{2} (150 sq mi)
- Elevation: 870 m (2,850 ft)

Population (2020)
  - Total: 44,471
  - Density: 114/km^{2} (296/sq mi)
- Time zone: UTC−3 (BRT)
- Postal code: 13990-000
- HDI (2010): 0.787 – high
- Website: www.pinhal.sp.gov.br

Espírito Santo do Pinhal (Portuguese meaning "Holy Spirit of Pinhal") is a municipality in the state of São Paulo in Brazil. The population in 2020 is 44,471 (IBGE 2020) and the area is 389 km^{2}. The elevation is 870 m.

== Demographics ==
Historical population (municipality)
Year	Population	%±
1920	30,659
1940	32,717	6.7%
1950	28,805	−12.0%
1960	25,720	−10.7%
1970	27,299	6.1%
1980	33,359	22.2%
1991	37,178	11.4%
2000	40,480	8.9%
2010	41,907	3.5%
2022	39,816	−5.0%

== Media ==
In telecommunications, the city was served by Telecomunicações de São Paulo. In July 1998, this company was acquired by Telefónica, which adopted the Vivo brand in 2012. The company is currently an operator of cell phones, fixed lines, internet (fiber optics/4G) and television (satellite and cable).

== Notable people ==
- Sebastião da Silveira Cintra

== See also ==
- List of municipalities in São Paulo
- Interior of São Paulo
