= Clube Atlético Taquaritinga =

Taquaritinga
- Full name: Clube Atlético Taquaritinga
- Nickname(s): CAT; Leão da Araraquarense
- Founded: 17 March 1942; 83 years ago
- Ground: Taquarão
- Capacity: 18,805
- League: Campeonato Paulista Série A4
- 2024: Paulista Série A4, 6th of 16
Home colours	Away colours

Clube Atlético Taquaritinga, commonly known as Taquaritinga, is a Brazilian football club based in Taquaritinga, São Paulo state. It competes in the Campeonato Paulista Segunda Divisão, the fourth tier of the São Paulo state football league.

== History ==
The club was founded on March 17, 1942. Taquaritinga was awarded the Troféu dos Invictos in 1957 by A Gazeta Esportiva newspaper after 20 games without losing. They won the Campeonato Paulista Série A3 in 1964, Campeonato Paulista Série A2 in 1982 and in 1992, and the Campeonato Paulista Segunda Divisão in 1997.

== Honours ==
- Campeonato Paulista Série A2
  - Winners (2): 1982, 1992
- Campeonato Paulista Série A3
  - Winners (1): 1964
- Campeonato Paulista Série A4
  - Winners (1): 1997

== Stadium ==
Clube Atlético Taquaritinga play their home games at Estádio Municipal Adail Nunes da Silva, nicknamed Taquarão. The stadium has a maximum capacity of 18,805 people.
