= Renato Peixe =

Brazilian footballer and manager

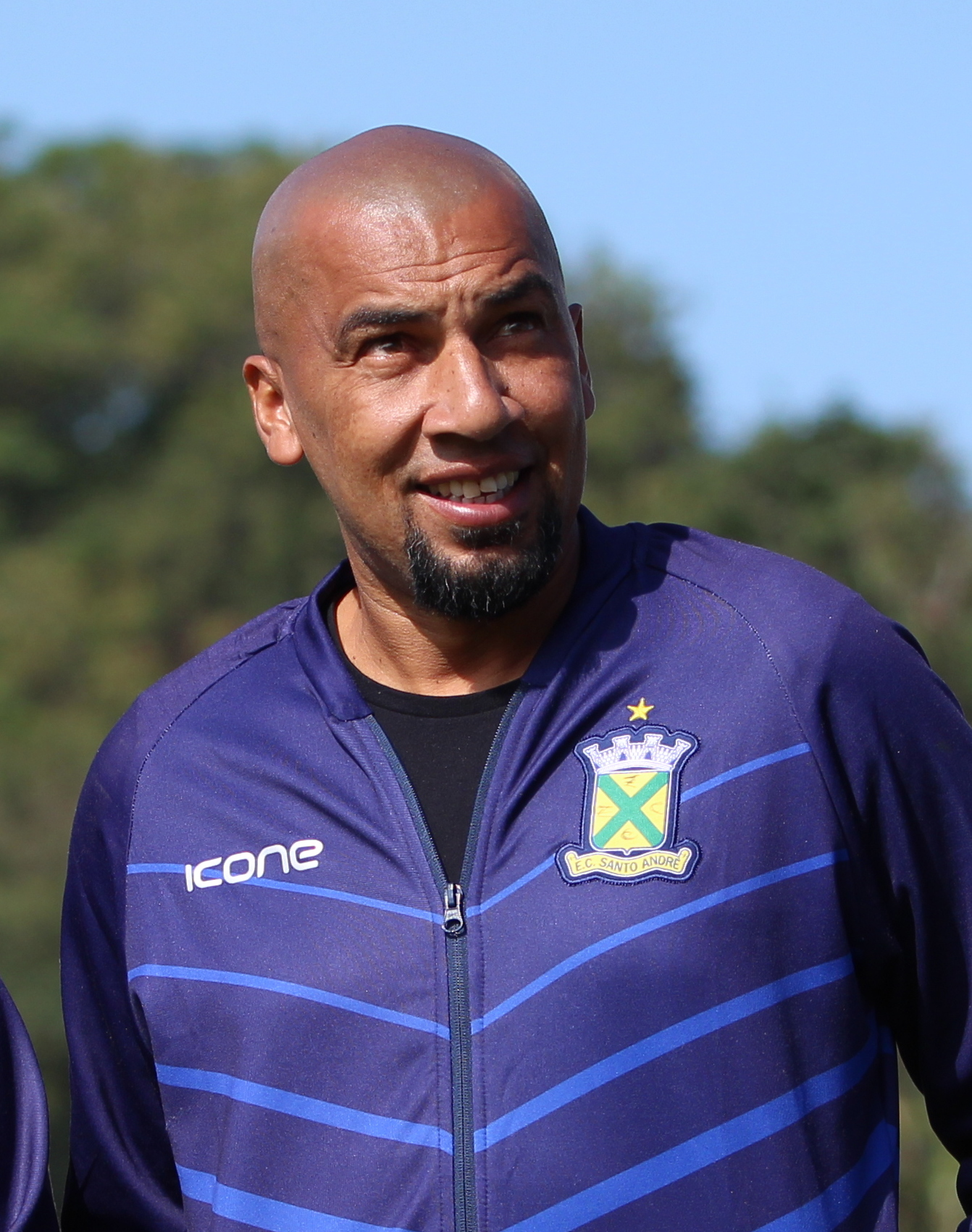
- Renato Peixe with Santo André in 2022

Personal information
- Full name: Renato da Cunha Pereira
- Date of birth: 26 February 1979 (age 47)
- Place of birth: Rio de Janeiro, Brazil
- Height: 1.76 m (5 ft 9 in)
- Position: Left back

Youth career
- 1996: Botafogo

Senior career*
Years	Team	Apps	(Gls)
1997-1999	Bragantino		
2000	São Gonçalo-RN		
2000	América-RN		
2001	São Gonçalo-RN		
2001-2002	Figueirense		
2002	São Gonçalo-RN		
2002	Fortaleza		
2003	ABC		
2003	Coríntians de Caicó		
2004	Campinense		
2004	Treze		
2005	Joinville		
2006	Juventus-SP		
2006	Botafogo-SP		
2007	Ferroviária	13	(0)
2008-2009	São Bernardo	43	(14)
2010	Guaratinguetá	57	(14)
2011	Mirassol	9	(0)
2011-2012	São Bernardo	24	(6)
2012-2013	Guaratinguetá	79	(17)
2014-2015	Santo André	33	(1)
2014	→ São Caetano (loan)	16	(1)
2015	São José-SP	0	
2016	Monte Azul	13	(1)
2017	São José dos Campos	17	(5)

Managerial career
- 2017–2019: São Bernardo (assistant)
- 2019: EC São Bernardo (assistant)
- 2019-2021: EC São Bernardo
- 2021: São José-SP
- 2021-2022: EC São Bernardo
- 2022: Santo André
- 2022: Lemense
- 2023–2024: EC São Bernardo
- 2024: Ipatinga
- 2024–2025: Comercial-SP
- * Club domestic league appearances and goals

Renato da Cunha Pereira (born 26 February 1979), commonly known as Renato Peixe is a Brazilian professional football coach and former player. He was most recently the head coach of Comercial-SP.

He played most of his career as a left back or midfielder, although he was capable of playing as a winger if needed. With over 120 caps, he has achieved cult status at Guaratinguetá. He is also the fifth most capped player in São Bernardo history, featuring in 125 matches and being the team captain in the club's first ever championship win.

== Club career ==
Renato started his career at the youth ranks of Botafogo, playing as a midfielder, but he made his senior debut for Bragantino, playing in the 1999 Campeonato Brasileiro Série B.

After leaving the Bragança Paulista club, he signed for Campeonato Potiguar side São Gonçalo in 2000. Under head coach Paulo Moroni, he ended up scoring three goals during the tournament and helping the club finish second overall. His play caught the attention of América de Natal, which promptly signed Renato Peixe to play in the Copa João Havelange Group Yellow. He returned to São Gonçalo the next year, finishing the 2001 Campeonato Potiguar as the club's top scorer, netting five goals.

Nevertheless, Renato Peixe's offensive style of play got him a move to Figueirense in the Série B. He became a starting midfielder under Gilmar da Costa, but lost his starting spot after suffering a groin injury. He was part of the roster that finished second and achieved promotion back to the first division. On 17 July 2002, he was released by Figueirense.

He then signed for Fortaleza for the remainder of the year. He scored two goals in his Campeonato Cearense debut, leading his new club to a 3–1 win over Boa Viagem on 18 July. He would score again on 29 July, in a 3–1 victory over bitter rivals Ceará. Renato Peixe played in 12 of the 29 games in the Campeonato Brasileiro Série B as the Leão do Pici won promotion to the 2003 Série A.

After brief spells with Coríntians de Caicó, ABC and Campinense, on 29 June 2004 he joined Série C club Treze.

Renato Peixe was signed by Joinville on 8 November 2004, helping the club to a fourth place on the 2005 Campeonato Catarinense. He renewed his contract for the Série A2 later that year, in which Joinville were crowned champions. After a stint with Juventus, he joined Botafogo de Ribeirão Preto in 2006.

=== Ferroviária ===
On 4 January 2007, Renato Peixe was signed by Ferroviária, reuniting him with head coach Edison Só, with whom he had won the Paulista A3 with Botafogo de Ribeirão Preto. The one-year-deal saw him play in the Campeonato Paulista Série A3 and the Copa do Brasil, as well as in the Copa FPF. On 28 January, he made his debut away to Flamengo de Guarulhos as a late game substitute. He made his first start on February 17, playing the full 90 minutes in a 1–0 win at the Fonte Luminosa against Catanduvense. Peixe would be named again in the starting lineup on 4 March in a 1–0 home win over XV de Piracicaba and on April 15 in a 3–3 away draw against Votoraty, as Ferroviária finished the first stage at the top of the table.

On 2 May, he was once again named among the starters for the match against Linense, relegating then first-choice left back Fernando Luís to the bench. He was in the starting lineup in all games for the remainder of the second stage, in which Ferrinha achieved promotion but didn't advance to the finals.

For the 2007 Copa FPF, Renato Peixe was moved to the midfield and given the number 10 shirt. On 1 August, he scored his lone goal for Ferroviária in a 2–2 draw with Botafogo de Ribeirão Preto at Santa Cruz. He was later moved back to defence by coach Edison Só for the remainder of the competition, failing to be constantly figured in the starting XI.

=== São Bernardo ===
Série A3 side São Bernardo FC signed Renato Peixe from Ferroviária for the 2008 season. He scored his first goal for the club on his Serie A3 debut against Independente de Limeira in a 1–1 away tie on 27 January 2008. On 8 March, Renato Peixe scored his first hat-trick for São Bernardo in a 4–1 win against Votoraty. Peixe became a valuable player for the club during the season, being played as a left winger by coach Lelo. He scored eight goals during the first stage and helped the club finish fourth, advancing to the second stage.

On 17 May, Renato Peixe opened the scoring for Bernô in a 3–1 home victory against Linense. Eight days later, he would score again against the same opponent, improving his goal tally to 10 on the year as his team won 4–1 at Gilbertão. São Bernardo took first place in a group that also featured Linense, Votoraty and Oeste Paulista, achieving promotion for the Série A2 for the first time and qualifying for the finals against Flamengo de Guarulhos.

In the first leg of the Série A3 finals, on 8 June, Renato Peixe scored from a free kick in the 39th minute to tie the game 1–1 at 1º de Maio. He would score again in the second leg, opening the scoring in the 24th minute, converting a penalty suffered by Raul. Flamengo would tie the game sixteen minutes later, giving the Guarulhos team the trophy, as they had the better overall record after the two legs ended in a tie. Renato finished the Série A3 as the club's top goalscorer, finding the back of the net 12 times during the tournament.

During the second half of the year, São Bernardo played in the Copa Paulista. The club's performance was not very positive, being eliminated in the first stage, having accumulated seven defeats in 14 games. Renato would go on to score five more goals during the competition, bringing his season totals to 17.

Renato Peixe stayed with the São Bernardo do Campo club for the 2009 Campeonato Paulista Série A2. He was a starter in the first game of the year, a 1–2 home defeat to Rio Branco on 24 January 2009. He had an eventful game a week later against Ferroviária: he netted an own goal in the 28th minute, only to score from the penalty spot seven minutes later to tie the game, which would end 2–1, giving São Bernardo their first ever Série A2 win. He continued to be featured on the left wing after the departure of Lelo, only missing one Série A2 match after picking up three yellow cards. However, his offensive production ended up being considerably smaller than previous season's, as he would only score again on 25 March in a 2–1 come-from-behind victory over Atlético Sorocaba.

Under Luciano Dias, Renato Peixe was given the number 10 shirt and was an undisputed starter for the beginning of the Copa Paulista later that year. But as the year went on, he fell out of favor with the new coach and was deemed surplus by the end of the year, prompting a move out of Tigre. He finished the season with 38 games played and 4 goals scored in all competitions.

=== Guaratinguetá ===
Renato joined newly promoted Série B side Guaratinguetá for the 2010 season. In his new club, he made the switch back to defence under coach Nedo Xavier and later Luís Carlos Martins. On 13 January 2010, he scored his first goal for Guará in his Série A2 debut for the club, in a 1–1 away draw to Votoraty. His display in that game put him in the Team of the Week. On 21 January he had an assist and scored a late game-winning goal to help his team overcome a one-goal deficit and defeat São Bento at Walter Ribeiro, earning him his second appearance in the Team of The Week. On 24 January, he led Guará to a 3–1 home win over Taquaritinga with two assists in the game, but was sent off before the final whistle, making him miss the next match. He made the Team of the Week for the third time on 13 February, following a 1–1 home draw against Linense. On 21 February, he had an assist and scored the third goal as Guaratinguetá beat Noroeste 3–0, winning him a fourth Team of the Week spot.

On 17 April, Peixe scored in the 75th minute to secure an away draw in a derby against São José. He would later acknowledge that as one of the most important matches he scored on. His play helped Guaratinguetá win promotion to the state league first division after just one year in the second tier. Renato's seven goals during the tournament put him as the club's second top goalscorer, and he was voted by journalists as the best left-back of the tournament.

Peixe would be a mainstay for Guará during the 2010 Série B as well. He scored twice in his first national match for the club on 8 May, helping Guaratinguetá to a 3–1 home win against Duque de Caxias, the first three points ever won by the Garça in Série B history. On 29 May he put on a decisive performance against Santo André, netting the first goal of the match and assisting Nenê on the second as his team won 3–1 at Dario Rodrigues Leite. He made 33 appearances for the club during the league, all of them as a starter on the left side of the defense, netting seven goals as Guaratinguetá avoided relegation by just one point.

=== Mirassol ===
In December 2010, it was announced Renato Peixe signed a short deal with Mirassol to play for the club during the Paulistão. On 16 January 2011, he made his debut against Ponte Preta, a game Mirassol went on to win 2–1. He played 74 minutes before being replaced by Diego. Although he was chosen as the starting left back for the first two games, Peixe was subbed out in both matches and was later relegated to the bench in favor of Diego. After 14 games, head coach Ivan Baitello put him in the starting lineup on April 3, as he played 72 minutes before being replaced by Marcelinho in a 0–1 loss to São Paulo at Arena Barueri. On 17 April, he played the full 90 minutes for the only time during his tenure with Mirassol, in a 0–3 away loss to Botafogo de Ribeirão Preto.

=== Return to São Bernardo ===
His return to Tigre was announced on 31 May 2011, as he signed a one-year contract with the club, reuniting him with head coach Luis Carlos Martins. Peixe made his Copa Paulista return for São Bernardo in a 1–2 defeat away to Juventus, playing the full 90 minutes as a left back. He scored his first two goals in his second spell at 1º de Maio on 7 August, leading Bernô to a 2–1 away win against São José. On 9 November 2011, Renato made his 100th São Bernardo appearance in a 0–2 loss to Comercial at Santa Cruz. Renato started in 25 games and scored a total three goals, as São Bernardo was eliminated by Comercial in the Copa Paulista semifinals.

Renato Peixe was São Bernardo's team captain for the 2012 Paulista Série A2. He was a starter in their first game of the season, a 0–1 defeat against São Carlos. His first goal of the year was scored on 4 February, as he converted a penalty kick suffered by Danielzinho in a 1–2 home loss to Atlético Sorocaba. On 11 February, he helped Bernô win their first game of the season after five consecutive losses, scoring the third goal in a 4–2 victory against União São João. A week later, he scored from the penalty spot to secure a 1–0 win over Santacruzense. He scored again the following match, against Penapolense.

On 5 May, after missing a penalty shot earlier in the first leg of the Série A2 finals against União Barbarense, Renato Peixe converted an injury time penalty kick to tie the game at 1–1. After another draw in the second leg, São Bernardo won their first title in club history, as Renato Peixe lifted the Paulista Série A2 trophy as team captain. He finished the tournament with six goals in 24 appearances.

=== Return to Guaratinguetá ===
In June 2012, Renato Peixe left São Bernardo for a second stint with Guaratinguetá in the Brasileirão Série B. He was named team captain on his return. He made his return for Guará on 16 June after coming on as a 67th-minute substitute in a 1–0 away defeat against Bragantino. Under new head coach Pintado, Renato Peixe started for the first time in a 1–1 draw against Avaí, on 23 June. His first goal came on 28 August against Criciúma, opening the scoring in a 2–1 home win. On 17 November, he set up the first goal and scored the second as Guaratinguetá beat Ipatinga 3–2 at Ipatingão. On 24 November, Renato Peixe played a crucial part in helping Guaratinguetá escape relegation, as he scored a header against Barueri, ensuring a 2–1 win in the last matchday, which moved the team out of the relegation zone. He ended his first season back with Guaratinguetá with four goals and one assist in 26 Série B appearances.

He was a regular starter for the 2013 Paulista Série A2. On 23 January, Renato Peixe scored Guaratinguetá's opening goal of the season and assisted Wellington Pimenta as their team started the year with a 3–1 away win against São Carlos. On 31 March 2013, Renato Peixe made his 100th appearance with Guaratinguetá in a 0–0 home draw against Rio Claro, in the final matchday of the Série A2 first stage. He made 24 appearances and scored eight goals in Paulista Série A2, finishing as the club's joint-top goalscorer alongside strikers Jonatas Belusso and Douglas Tanque.

Renato Peixe played 29 matches in the 2013 Brasileirão Série B, having scored five goals and provided a single assist during the league. He was Guaratinguetá's second most capped player in the competition, behind goalkeeper Saulo and was the club's top goalscorer alongside Jonatas Belusso. Unlike in the previous season, Guaratinguetá didn't avoid relegation to Série C, finishing 17th on the table.

=== Santo André ===
On 2 December 2013, Renato Peixe became Santo André's third signing for the 2014 season. He made his first start for Ramalhão on 25 January in a 2–0 home win over his former team Guaratinguetá, being replaced in the 77th minute by Ramalho. On 12 April, Renato Peixe scored for the first time for Santo André in a derby against bitter rivals São Caetano, netting the third goal in a 3–1 win. He was a regular starter for the club in the Série A2, having made 18 appearances and recording two assists as the club finished a respectable 6th place.

==== São Caetano (loan) ====
As his wages were deemed too high for Copa Paulista standards, Renato Peixe was loaned together with three more players to São Caetano for the 2014 Brasileirão Série C. At Anacleto Campanella, he was reunited with former Santo André head coach Vilson Taddei. He made his Azulão debut on 27 April against Guarani. Renato Peixe's only goal for São Caetano came on 24 August, as he scored from the penalty spot in a 2–0 home win over Caxias.

He returned to Santo André at the end of the year. Renato Peixe was a starter in 14 games for Ramalhão's 2015 Série A2 campaign, but failing to score a single goal.

=== São José ===
On 25 June 2015, Renato Peixe signed a six-month deal with São José. He made his Copa Paulista debut for the club on 18 July, playing the full 90 minutes in a goalless draw against Juventus. He made four more appearances as the Águia do Vale lost the following seven games and finished the cup with the worst record overall.

=== Monte Azul ===
Renato Peixe joined Monte Azul for the 2016 Paulista Série A2. He was reunited once again with Edison Só, his former trainer at Botafogo and Ferroviária. On 20 February, Renato Peixe made his debut in a 2–0 away defeat to Atlético Sorocaba. On 9 March, he scored from the penalty spot in a 2–1 win over Batatais, which was his only goal for Monte Azul. He made 13 appearances during the competition as Monte Azul finished 16th and was demoted to Série A3 the next season.

=== São José dos Campos ===
In January 2017, aged 37, he signed for Paulista Série A3 club São José dos Campos, looking to provide veteran leadership to a group of youngsters. Renato Peixe was named the club captain for the competition and was given the number 8 shirt. He made his debut on 29 January, playing the full 90 minutes and appearing as a playmaking midfielder in a 0–1 defeat to his former club Monte Azul. On 8 February Renato Peixe scored his first São José dos Campos goal in a last-minute penalty kick to secure a 1–0 away win over Matonense. He was sent off in a 1–1 draw against Nacional on 20 February for insulting match official José Roberto Marques following a yellow card. After serving a one-game suspension, he was back in the starting lineup for the 5 March clash against Portuguesa Santista, scoring a penalty kick for the team's lone goal in a 1–3 loss.

Renato Peixe netted his third league goal for São José dos Campos on 19 March, scoring a last-minute equalizer from the penalty spot in a 1–1 home draw against Desportivo Brasil, helping his team move up one spot on the standings. He picked up a third yellow card during a 0–1 away defeat to Comercial on 26 March, which got him out of the next match against Inter de Limeira. He would go on to score twice in a 5–0 thrashing of Marília at Martins Pereira, netting the Tigre do Vale's third goal from a Michael pass into the 6-yard box in the 72nd minute, and the closing goal from a penalty kick, eight minutes later.

He left São José dos Campos at the end of the 2017 Paulista Série A3, featuring in 17 league matches and scoring five goals, the second most in the team. The club, however, ended up being relegated, falling victim to the new Série A3 rules which were created to reduce the number of teams in the division. São José dos Campos finished 16th with 24 points in 19 games.

== Style of play ==
Renato Peixe played most of his career as a left–sided full-back or wing-back. He contributed to attacks through forward runs and by cuttign inside.

== Coaching career ==
=== Assistant to Wilson Júnior ===
In May 2017, Renato Peixe became assistant coach of São Bernardo, working alongside his former São Bernardo teammate Wilson Júnior. Wilson and Renato also worked together at Monte Azul, as the former was head coach of the club and the latter was a player. São Bernardo played in the 2017 Brasileirão Série D, achieving a respectable 9th place in the final standings, after being eliminated by São José-RS in a penalty shootout in the third stage of the league. The team also did well the following season, narrowly missing promotion in the 2018 Campeonato Paulista Série A2 but not going past the second stage in the 2018 Copa Paulista.

In October 2018, Wilson, Renato and fitness coach Deivid Marques signed with fellow Série A2 side Nacional, but after two months and no official matches, the trio returned to Tigre. On 10 February 2019, they were fired from São Bernardo, following a six-game winless streak to start the 2019 Paulistão Série A2.

=== EC São Bernardo ===
Shortly after his dismissal from São Bernardo, he was signed by their crosstown rivals, EC São Bernardo. Initially, Renato Peixe served as assistant coach under Oliveira and Régis Angeli. When Angeli resigned on 2 July 2019, Renato Peixe took over as caretaker coach. His first game in charge was a 0–1 defeat against Grêmio Osasco in the Copa Paulista. On 12 July, he was named as the new head coach of Esporte Clube São Bernardo. Under Renato Peixe, the Cachorrão achieved their best ever Copa Paulista finish, reaching the semifinals before being eliminated by fellow ABC Region side and eventual champions São Caetano.

Renato Peixe led EC São Bernardo to the 2020 Campeonato Paulista Série A3 finals, winning promotion to the second division but missing the chance to win the league title. After losing six of the first eight games in the 2021 Campeonato Paulista Série A2, Renato Peixe resigned as head coach, following a 1–0 away defeat to Red Bull Brasil on 26 April.

=== São José ===
On 1 May, Renato Peixe was announced as the new head coach of São José, replacing Ricardo Costa. He left the club at the end of the 2021 Campeonato Paulista Série A3.

=== EC São Bernardo (second stint) ===
On 23 July, Renato Peixe was chosen to coach EC São Bernardo in the 2021 Copa Paulista. The club made it to the quarterfinals, being eliminated by their city rivals (and Renato Peixe's former club), São Bernardo Futebol Clube.

=== EC Santo André ===
On 17 May, Renato Peixe was chosen to coach Santo André in the 2021 Série D.

== Personal life ==
Renato got his nickname Peixe during his years at Bragantino. As the club had another player with the same name as him, he got nicknamed Peixe (Fish, in Portuguese) due to being from Rio de Janeiro, where Peixe is a slang term meaning mate or pal. He was a Flamengo supporter during his childhood, and his footballing idol was Zico.

== Honours and achievements ==
=== Club ===
São Bernardo

- Campeonato Paulista Série A2 (1): 2012

Botafogo-SP

- Campeonato Paulista Série A3 (1): 2006

=== Individual ===
Awards

- Paulista Série A2 Team of the Season: 2010
