= 2020 Campeonato Paulista Série A3 =

Brazilian football season

Campeonato Paulista Série A3
- Season: 2020
- Dates: 25 January 2020 – 16 November 2020
- Champions: Velo Clube
- Promoted: Velo Clube; EC São Bernardo
- Relegated: Grêmio Osasco; Paulista
- Matches: 134
- Goals: 316 (2.36 per match)
- Top goalscorer: Lucas Duni (9 goals)
- Biggest home win: Marília 5–0 Grêmio Osasco (19 September)
- Biggest away win: Barretos 0–4 Linense (18 September)
- Highest scoring: Capivariano 4–2 Velo Clube (22 February)
- Longest winning run: 5 matches Noroeste
- Longest unbeaten run: 6 matches Comercial
- Longest winless run: 5 matches Paulista; Primavera; Nacional
- Longest losing run: 4 matches Paulista
- Highest attendance: 5,847; Noroeste 1–0 Marília (29 January)
- Lowest attendance: 66; Capivariano 2–0 Paulista (4 March)
- Total attendance: 54,520
- Average attendance: 620
- All statistics correct as of 21 September 2020.

The 2020 Campeonato Paulista Série A3 is the 27th season of the third level of the São Paulo state league under its current title and the 67th season overall.

Due to the ongoing COVID-19 pandemic, the season was indefinitely suspended on 16 March. Play was resumed on 19 September. Velo Clube were crowned champions, winning promotion alongside EC São Bernardo.

== Team changes ==
The following teams have changed division since the 2019 season.

=== To Série A3 ===
Promoted from Segunda Divisão

- Paulista
- Marília

Relegated from Série A2

- Nacional
- Linense

=== From Série A3 ===
Promoted to Série A2

- Audax
- Monte Azul

Relegated to Segunda Divisão

- Taboão da Serra
- São Carlos

== Stadiums ==
Locations of the 2020 Paulistão A3 teams

Club	Location	Stadium	Capacity
Barretos	Barretos	Fortaleza	9,710
Batatais	Batatais	Osvaldo Scatena	7,040
Capivariano	Capivari	Toca do Leão (Note: Capivariano played at Santa Bárbara do Oeste, 30 kilometres away from Capivari, as their home stadium Arena Capivari was closed due to safety concerns)	6,424
Comercial	Ribeirão Preto	Palma Travassos	18,277
Desportivo Brasil	Porto Feliz	Ernesto Rocco	6,160
EC São Bernardo	São Bernardo do Campo	1º de Maio	12,578
Grêmio Osasco	Osasco	Prefeito José Liberatti	12,158
Linense	Lins	Gilbertão	7,348
Marília	Marília	Bento de Abreu	15,587
Nacional	São Paulo (Barra Funda)	Comendador Souza	10,117
Noroeste	Bauru	Alfredo de Castilho	15,420
Olímpia	Olímpia	Maria Tereza Breda	6,912
Paulista	Jundiaí	Jayme Cintra	12,690
Primavera	Indaiatuba	Ítalo Limongi	6,914
Rio Preto	São José do Rio Preto	Anísio Haddad	16,145
Velo Clube	Rio Claro	Benitão	10,317

== Personnel and sponsoring ==
Team	Manager^{1}	Kit manufacturer	Sponsor
Barretos	(Brazil) Ricardo Moraes	Esporte Fernando	Festa do Peão de Barretos
Batatais	(Brazil) Nívio	Geração Sport	Refrigerantes Jabotí
Capivariano	(Brazil) Ricardo Costa	Mayor	Microsal
Comercial	(Brazil) Fahel Júnior	Geração Sport	Sicredi
Desportivo Brasil	(Brazil) Élio Sizenando	Nike	—
EC São Bernardo	(Brazil) Renato Peixe	Reply	Lava-Roupas Ares
Grêmio Osasco	(Brazil) Leonardo Vitorino	Ícone Sports	EMS
Linense	(Brazil) Xandão	Karilu	Cristalins
Marília	(Brazil) Guilherme Alves	Kanxa	Construtora Pacaembu
Nacional	(Brazil) Tuca Guimarães	Nakal	—
Noroeste	(Brazil) Luís Carlos Martins	Nakal	Unigrês Cerâmica
Olímpia	(Brazil) Zé Humberto	Duda Sport	Grupo Natos
Paulista	(Brazil) Oliveira	Pratic Sports	—
Primavera	(Brazil) Paulo Pereira	D10 Sports	—
Rio Preto	(Brazil) Carlos Rossi	Nakal	Sicoob
Velo Clube	(Brazil) Cleber Gaúcho	Monely	Esmaltec

== Managerial changes ==
Team	Outgoing manager	Manner of departure	Date of vacancy	Position in table	Incoming manager	Date of appointment
Olímpia	(Brazil) Paulo Mulle	Resigned	17 December 2019	Pre-season	(Brazil) Mário Tilico	17 December 2019
Olímpia	(Brazil) Mário Tilico	Sacked	11 January	Pre-season	(Brazil) Alexandre Ferreira	11 January
Grêmio Osasco	(Brazil) Luis Carlos	Resigned	21 January	Pre-season	(Brazil) Bruno Liu	21 January
Marília	(Brazil) Júlio Sérgio	Sacked	2 February	15th	(Brazil) Guilherme Alves	3 February
Primavera	(Brazil) Daniel Sabino	Resigned	8 February	12th	(Brazil) Paulo Pereira	10 February
Comercial	(Brazil) Roberval Davino	Mutual consent	9 February	14th	(Brazil) Fahel Júnior	10 February
Batatais	(Brazil) Edson Boaro	Resigned	11 February	2nd	(Brazil) Nívio (Note: Nívio was initially appointed as caretaker manager, but the move was made permanent on 20 February 2020.)	11 February
Rio Preto	(Brazil) Régis Angeli	Resigned	13 February	10th	(Brazil) João Santos (Brazil) Ivan Canela (caretakers)	13 February
Paulista	(Brazil) Edson Fio	Sacked	13 February	16th	(Brazil) Oliveira	13 February
Grêmio Osasco	(Brazil) Bruno Liu	Sacked	15 February	12th	(Brazil) Leonardo David (caretaker)	16 February
Linense	(Brazil) João Vallim	Signed by Taubaté	19 February	3rd	(Brazil) Xandão (caretaler)	19 February
Linense	(Brazil) Xandão (caretaler)	End of caretaker spell	24 February	2nd	(Brazil) Márcio Ribeiro	24 February
Olímpia	(Brazil) Alexandre Ferreira	Sacked	1 March	12th	(Brazil) Paulinho Fonseca (caretaker)	1 March
Olímpia	(Brazil) Paulinho Fonseca (caretaker)	End of caretaker spell	3 March	12th	(Brazil) Leandro Chibior	3 March
Rio Preto	(Brazil) João Santos (Brazil) Ivan Canela (caretakers)	End of caretaker spell	5 March (Note: Before the appointment of Rossi, Rio Preto were managed by caretaker João Santos in 4 games and by Ivan Canela in one match.)	12th	(Brazil) Carlos Rossi	5 March
Linense	(Brazil) Márcio Ribeiro	Resigned	9 March	7th	(Brazil) Xandão	10 March
Olímpia	(Brazil) Leandro Chibior	Resigned	10 March	11th	(Brazil) Zé Humberto	10 March
Grêmio Osasco	(Brazil) Leonardo David (caretaker)	End of caretaker spell	11 March	12th	(Brazil) Leonardo Vitorino	11 March

== League table ==
Pos	Team	Pld	W	D	L	GF	GA	GD	Pts	Qualification or relegation
1	Velo Clube (C)	21	11	6	4	27	14	+13	39	Promoted to Campeonato Paulista Série A2
2	EC São Bernardo (P)	21	13	3	5	35	18	+17	42	Promoted to Campeonato Paulista Série A2
3	Noroeste	19	11	5	3	27	12	+15	38	Qualified for the semifinals
4	Comercial	19	10	4	5	31	23	+8	34	Qualified for the semifinals
5	Capivariano	17	7	5	5	21	17	+4	26	Eliminated the quarterfinals
6	Linense	17	6	5	6	22	23	−1	23	Eliminated the quarterfinals
7	Nacional	17	5	8	4	18	17	+1	23	Eliminated the quarterfinals
8	Batatais	17	5	7	5	15	20	−5	22	Eliminated the quarterfinals
9	Desportivo Brasil	15	5	3	7	20	20	0	18	
10	Marília	15	4	6	5	16	15	+1	18	
11	Rio Preto	15	4	4	7	15	19	−4	16	
12	Olímpia	15	4	4	7	17	23	−6	16	
13	Primavera	15	4	3	8	13	20	−7	15	
14	Barretos	15	3	4	8	15	26	−11	13	
15	Grêmio Osasco (R)	15	3	3	9	12	23	−11	12	Relegation to Segunda Divisão
16	Paulista (R)	15	3	2	10	12	26	−14	11	Relegation to Segunda Divisão

Updated to match(es) played on 12 December 2020. Source: Paulista Série A3 (in Portuguese), Soccerway
Rules for classification: 1st points; 2nd wins; 3rd goal difference; 4th goals scored; 5th least yellow cards received; 6th least red cards received; 7th draw.
(C) Champions; (P) Promoted; (R) Relegated

== Knockout stage ==
=== Bracket ===
Quarterfinals
5	Velo Clube	2	0	2
4	Capivariano	0	0	0
8	Nacional	0	1	1 (3)
1	Noroeste (p)	0	1	1 (5)
6	Linense	0	1	1
3	Comercial	1	3	4
7	Batatais	0	2	2
2	EC São Bernardo	3	3	6

Semifinals
4	Velo Clube	0	2	2
1	Noroeste	0	1	1
3	Comercial	1	1	2
2	EC São Bernardo	3	3	6

Finals
2	Velo Clube	2	3	5
1	EC São Bernardo	1	0	1

== Season statistics ==
=== Top scorers ===
As of 16 November 2020

Rank	Player	Club	Goals
1	(Brazil) Lucas Duni	Velo Clube	8
2	(Brazil) Victor Sapo	EC São Bernardo	7
3	(Brazil) Felipe	EC São Bernardo	6
3	(Brazil) Fabrício Daniel	Noroeste	6
3	(Brazil) Gabriel Barcos	Rio Preto	6
