= 2019 Campeonato Paulista Série A3 =

Football contest in Brazil in 2019

Campeonato Paulista Série A3
- Season: 2019
- Dates: 19 January – 5 May
- Champions: Audax (1st title)
- Promoted: Audax; Monte Azul
- Relegated: Taboão da Serra; São Carlos
- Matches: 134
- Goals: 309 (2.31 per match)
- Top goalscorer: Matheus Marcondele; Lucas Pajeú (11 goals)
- Total attendance: 89,797
- Average attendance: 675

The 2019 Campeonato Paulista Série A3 was the 27th season of the third level of the São Paulo state league under its current title and the 66th season overall.

== Team changes ==
The following teams have changed division since the 2018 season.

=== To Série A3 ===
Promoted from Segunda Divisão

- Primavera
- Comercial

Relegated from Série A2

- Audax
- Batatais

=== From Série A3 ===
Promoted to Série A2

- Atibaia
- Portuguesa Santista

Relegated to Segunda Divisão

- Rio Branco
- Marília
- União Barbarense
- Manthiqueira
- Matonense
- Mogi Mirim

== Stadiums ==
Locations of the 2019 Paulistão A3 teams

| Club | Location | Stadium | Capacity |
|---|---|---|---|
| Audax | Osasco | Prefeito José Liberatti | 12,158 |
| Barretos | Barretos | Fortaleza | 9,710 |
| Batatais | Batatais | Osvaldo Scatena | 7,040 |
| Capivariano | Capivari | Arena Capivari | 15,406 |
| Comercial | Ribeirão Preto | Palma Travassos | 18,277 |
| Desportivo Brasil | Porto Feliz | Ernesto Rocco | 6,160 |
| EC São Bernardo | São Bernardo do Campo | 1º de Maio | 12,578 |
| Grêmio Osasco | Osasco | Prefeito José Liberatti | 12,158 |
| Monte Azul | Monte Azul Paulista | Otacília Patrício Arroyo | 8,000 |
| Noroeste | Bauru | Alfredo de Castilho | 15,420 |
| Olímpia | Olímpia | Maria Tereza Breda | 6,912 |
| Primavera | Indaiatuba | Ítalo Limongi | 6,914 |
| Rio Preto | São José do Rio Preto | Anísio Haddad | 16,145 |
| São Carlos | São Carlos | Prof. Luiz Augusto de Oliveira | 8,138 |
| Taboão da Serra | Taboão da Serra | Vereador José Ferez | 6,111 |
| Velo Clube | Rio Claro | Benitão | 10,317 |

== League table ==
| Pos | Team | Pld | W | D | L | GF | GA | GD | Pts | Qualification or relegation |
|---|---|---|---|---|---|---|---|---|---|---|
| 1 | Audax (C, P) | 21 | 8 | 9 | 4 | 34 | 25 | +9 | 33 | Promoted to Série A2 |
| 2 | Monte Azul (P) | 21 | 8 | 6 | 7 | 23 | 22 | +1 | 30 | Promoted to Série A2 |
| 3 | Barretos | 19 | 9 | 6 | 4 | 20 | 15 | +5 | 33 | Eliminated in the semifinals |
| 4 | Desportivo Brasil | 19 | 9 | 4 | 6 | 35 | 22 | +13 | 31 | Eliminated in the semifinals |
| 5 | Velo Clube | 17 | 10 | 6 | 1 | 28 | 11 | +17 | 36 | Eliminated in the quarterfinals |
| 6 | Capivariano | 17 | 9 | 5 | 3 | 26 | 13 | +13 | 32 | Eliminated in the quarterfinals |
| 7 | Comercial | 17 | 7 | 6 | 4 | 16 | 12 | +4 | 27 | Eliminated in the quarterfinals |
| 8 | Noroeste | 17 | 6 | 8 | 3 | 17 | 14 | +3 | 26 | Eliminated in the quarterfinals |
| 9 | Primavera | 15 | 4 | 8 | 3 | 14 | 11 | +3 | 20 | |
| 10 | EC São Bernardo | 15 | 4 | 4 | 7 | 20 | 24 | −4 | 16 | |
| 11 | Rio Preto | 15 | 4 | 3 | 8 | 13 | 21 | −8 | 15 | |
| 12 | Batatais | 15 | 3 | 6 | 6 | 12 | 24 | −12 | 15 | |
| 13 | Grêmio Osasco | 15 | 4 | 2 | 9 | 15 | 21 | −6 | 14 | |
| 14 | Olímpia | 15 | 4 | 1 | 10 | 13 | 27 | −14 | 13 | |
| 15 | Taboão da Serra (R) | 15 | 1 | 7 | 7 | 11 | 22 | −11 | 10 | Relegated to Segunda Divisão |
| 16 | São Carlos (R) | 15 | 1 | 5 | 9 | 10 | 24 | −14 | 8 | Relegated to Segunda Divisão |

Updated to match(es) played on unknown. Source: Paulista Série A3 (in Portuguese), Soccerway
Rules for classification: 1st points; 2nd wins; 3rd goal difference; 4th goals scored; 5th least yellow cards received; 6th least red cards received; 7th draw.
(C) Champions; (P) Promoted; (R) Relegated

== Knockout stage ==
=== Bracket ===
Quarterfinals
3 | Desportivo Brasil | 0 | 3 | 3
6 | Comercial | 1 | 2 | 3
2 | Capivariano | 1 | 0 | 1
7 | Monte Azul | 0 | 2 | 2
4 | Noroeste | 1 | 0 | 1
5 | Barretos | 2 | 1 | 3
1 | Velo Clube | 0 | 0 | 0
8 | Audax | 0 | 2 | 2

Semifinals
1 | Desportivo Brasil | 0 | 1 | 1
4 | Monte Azul | 0 | 2 | 2
2 | Barretos | 1 | 0 | 1
3 | Audax | 0 | 2 | 2

Finals
1 | Monte Azul | 2 | 0 | 2
2 | Audax | 2 | 2 | 4

== Season statistics ==
=== Top scorers ===
| Rank | Player | Club | Goals |
|---|---|---|---|
| 1 | (Brazil) Matheus Marcondele | Audax | 11 |
| 1 | (Brazil) Lucas Pajeú | Desportivo Brasil | 11 |
| 3 | (Brazil) Marreta | Audax | 9 |
| 3 | (Brazil) Caio Vieira | Comercial | 9 |
| 3 | (Brazil) Marcelo Campanholo | Desportivo Brasil | 9 |
| 6 | (Brazil) Thauan | Olímpia | 8 |
