= 2011 Copa Paulista =

Tournament details
- Country: Brazil
- Teams: 36

Final positions
- Champions: Paulista
- Runners-up: Comercial

Tournament statistics
- Top goal scorer: João Paulo (Linense)

The 2011 Copa Paulista was the 13th edition of São Paulo State Cup. 32 teams participated in the tournament. The winner qualified for 2011 Recopa Sul-Brasileira and 2012 Copa do Brasil.

== Format ==
First stage: the 36 clubs were divided into four groups of nine according to their locations. The top four of each group advanced to the second stage.

Second stage: the 16 clubs were divided into four groups of four. The winner and runners-up of each group advanced to the knockout stage.

Each stage was played in a double round-robin format.

== Qualified teams ==
Campeonato Paulista Serie A1 (9 Teams+4 withdrew)
Palmeiras(2nd)	Corinthians (3rd)	Oeste (6th)	Paulista(10th)	Botafogo-SP (13th)	São Bernardo (17th)	
Linense _{(14th)}	Ituano (16th)	Noroeste _{(19th)}				
Campeonato Paulista A2 (12+1 Teams)
São José (1st)	XV de Piracicaba (2nd)	Catanduvense (3rd)	Rio Preto (5th)	Comercial (7th)	Red Bull Brasil (8th)	
Pão de Açúcar (9th)	Monte Azul (10th)	União São João (11th)	Rio Claro (12th)	Ferroviária (13th)	São Bento(18th)	Rio Branco-SP (20th)
Campeonato Paulista A3 (11+3 Teams)
Penapolense(1st)	Santacruzense(2nd)	Velo Clube (3rd)	São Carlos (4th)	Grêmio Osasco (5th)	XV de Jaú (6th)	Taubaté(7th)
Juventus-SP (9th)	Taboão da Serra (13th)	Batatais (11th)	Inter Bebedouro (16th)	Francana	Inter Limeira	Itapirense

(Positions after first stage)

== First stage ==
=== Group 1 ===
Pos	Team	Pld	W	D	L	GF	GA	GD	Pts
1	Inter Bebedouro	4	2	2	0	10	6	+4	8
2	Noroeste	4	2	1	1	4	2	+2	7
3	Linense	5	2	1	2	13	12	+1	7
4	Penapolense	4	2	1	1	6	3	+3	7
5	Rio Preto	4	1	3	0	2	1	+1	6
6	Oeste	4	2	0	2	5	5	0	6
7	Santacruzense	3	1	1	1	4	5	−1	4
8	XV de Jaú	4	0	2	2	1	6	−5	2
9	Catanduvense	4	0	1	3	1	6	−5	1

=== Group 2 ===
Pos	Team	Pld	W	D	L	GF	GA	GD	Pts
1	Velo Clube	4	2	2	0	7	3	+4	8
2	Comercial	5	2	1	2	7	5	+2	7
3	São Carlos	4	2	1	1	5	4	+1	7
4	Francana	4	2	0	2	3	3	0	6
5	União São João	4	1	2	1	4	3	+1	5
6	Ferroviária	4	1	1	2	6	7	−1	4
7	Botafogo-SP	4	1	1	2	3	7	−4	4
8	Batatais	3	1	0	2	6	9	−3	3

=== Group 3 ===
Pos	Team	Pld	W	D	L	GF	GA	GD	Pts
1	Ituano	4	3	1	0	9	3	+6	10
2	Red Bull Brasil	4	3	1	0	5	2	+3	10
3	Palmeiras	4	3	0	1	7	5	+2	9
4	XV de Piracicaba	3	2	1	0	7	1	+6	7
5	União Barbarense	5	1	1	3	4	7	−3	4
6	Itapirense	4	0	2	2	4	6	−2	2
7	Inter de Limeira	4	0	2	2	2	4	−2	2
8	São Bento	4	0	0	4	3	13	−10	0

=== Group 4 ===
Pos	Team	Pld	W	D	L	GF	GA	GD	Pts
1	São Bernardo	4	3	0	1	6	3	+3	9
2	Grêmio Osasco	4	2	1	1	7	4	+3	7
3	Juventus	5	2	1	2	6	5	+1	7
4	Taboão da Serra	5	2	1	2	5	6	−1	7
5	Paulista	4	1	2	1	6	5	+1	5
6	Corinthians	4	1	2	1	3	3	0	5
7	Pão de Açúcar	4	1	2	1	5	6	−1	5
8	Taubaté	5	1	2	2	8	11	−3	5
9	São José	5	1	1	3	3	6	−3	4
