= 2011 Campeonato Paulista knockout stage =

Season of football team

The knockout stage of the 2011 Campeonato Paulista began on 23 April 2011 with the quarter-finals, and concluded on 15 May 2011 with the final at Vila Belmiro in Santos.

== Round and draw dates ==
All draws held at Federação Paulista de Futebol headquarters in São Paulo, Brazil.

Round	Draw date	First leg	Second leg
Quarter-finals	18 April 2011	23–24 April 2011	–
Semi-finals	25 April 2011	30 April–1 May 2011	–
Finals	2 May 2011	8 May 2011	15 May 2011

== Format ==
The quarter-finals are played in one match at stadium of the best teams in the first phase. The 1st placed confronts the 8th, 2nd against the 7th, the 3rd against 6th and 4th against 5th. If no goals are scored during the match, the tie is decided by penalty shootout. The semi-finals are played in the same way of the quarter-finals. The final matches are played over two legs, with the best campaign team in previous stages playing the second match at home.

== Qualified teams ==
Pos	Team	Pld	W	D	L	GF	GA	GD	Pts
1	São Paulo	19	13	2	4	39	19	+20	41
2	Palmeiras	19	12	5	2	28	8	+20	41
3	Corinthians	19	11	5	3	33	12	+21	38
4	Santos	19	11	5	3	40	20	+20	38
5	Ponte Preta	19	9	5	5	22	16	+6	32
6	Oeste	19	9	4	6	25	17	+8	31
7	Mirassol	19	9	3	7	26	26	0	30
8	Portuguesa	19	8	4	7	24	23	+1	28

Updated to match(es) played on 17 April 2011. Source: Soccerway
Rules for classification: 1st points; 2nd wins; 3rd goal difference; 4th goals scored; 5th red cards received; 6th yellow cards received; 7th public draw

== Bracket ==
Quarterfinals
1	São Paulo	2
8	Portuguesa	0
4	Santos	1
5	Ponte Preta	0
2	Palmeiras	2
7	Mirassol	1
3	Corinthians	2
6	Oeste	1

Semifinals
1	São Paulo	0
4	Santos	2
2	Palmeiras	1(5)
3	Corinthians	1(6)

Final
4	Santos	0	2	2
3	Corinthians	0	1	1

== Quarter-finals ==
Team 1	Score	Team 2
São Paulo (Brazil)	2–0	(Brazil) Portuguesa
Santos (Brazil)	1–0	(Brazil) Ponte Preta
Palmeiras (Brazil)	2–1	(Brazil) Mirassol
Corinthians (Brazil)	2–1	(Brazil) Oeste

23 April
16:00 UTC-03:00

Santos	1 – 0	Ponte Preta
Neymar 21'	Report

Vila Belmiro, Santos
Attendance: 11,225
Referee: Rodrigo Braghetto

23 April
18:30 UTC-03:00

Corinthians	2 – 1	Oeste
Liédson 9'; Willian 65'	Report	Fábio Santos 45+1'

Pacaembu, São Paulo
Attendance: 31,192
Referee: Sálvio Spínola Fagundes Filho

24 April
16:00 UTC-03:00

São Paulo	2 – 0	Portuguesa
Ilsinho 40'; Dagoberto 80'	Report

Arena Barueri, Barueri
Attendance: 11,134
Referee: Aurélio Sant'Anna Martins

24 April
18:30 UTC-03:00

Palmeiras	2 – 1	Mirassol
Valdivia 10'; Márcio Araújo 56'	Report	Marcelinho 40'

Pacaembu, São Paulo
Attendance: 16,653
Referee: Guilherme Ceretta de Lima

== Semi-finals ==
Team 1	Score	Team 2
São Paulo (Brazil)	0–2	(Brazil) Santos
Corinthians (Brazil)	1–1 (6–5p)	(Brazil) Palmeiras

30 April
16:00 UTC-03:00

São Paulo	0 – 2	Santos
	Report	Elano 60'; Ganso 72'

Morumbi, São Paulo
Attendance: 44,675
Referee: Raphael Claus

1 May
16:00 UTC-03:00

Corinthians	1 – 1	Palmeiras
Willian 65'	Report	Leandro Amaro 52'
Penalties
Chicão (penalty scored); Willian (penalty scored); Fábio Santos (penalty scored); Leandro Castán (penalty scored); Morais (penalty scored); Ramírez (penalty scored)	6 – 5	(penalty scored) Kléber; (penalty scored) Marcos Assunção; (penalty scored) Márcio Araújo; (penalty scored) Luan; (penalty scored) Thiago Heleno; (penalty missed) João Vitor

Pacaembu, São Paulo
Attendance: 33,861
Referee: Paulo César de Oliveira

== Finals ==
Team 1	Agg.	Team 2	1st leg	2nd leg
Corinthias (Brazil)	1–2	(Brazil) Santos	0–0	1–2

=== First leg ===
8 May
16:00 UTC-03:00

Corinthians	0 – 0	Santos
	Report

Pacaembu, São Paulo
Attendance: 34,547
Referee: Cleber Wellington Abade

=== Second leg ===
15 May
16:00 UTC-03:00

Santos	2 – 1	Corinthias
Arouca 16'; Neymar 83'	Report	Morais 86'

Vila Belmiro, Santos
Attendance: 14,322
Referee: Luiz Flávio de Oliveira
