= List of Associação Portuguesa de Desportos statistics =

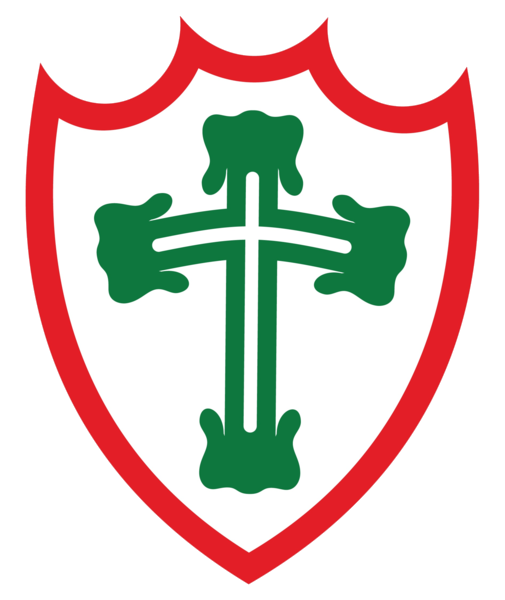
Portuguesa official logo.

Associação Portuguesa de Desportos, simply known as Portuguesa or Lusa, is a football team based in São Paulo, Brazil. It was founded on 14 August 1920, and is one of the five biggest clubs of the São Paulo state.

== Honours ==
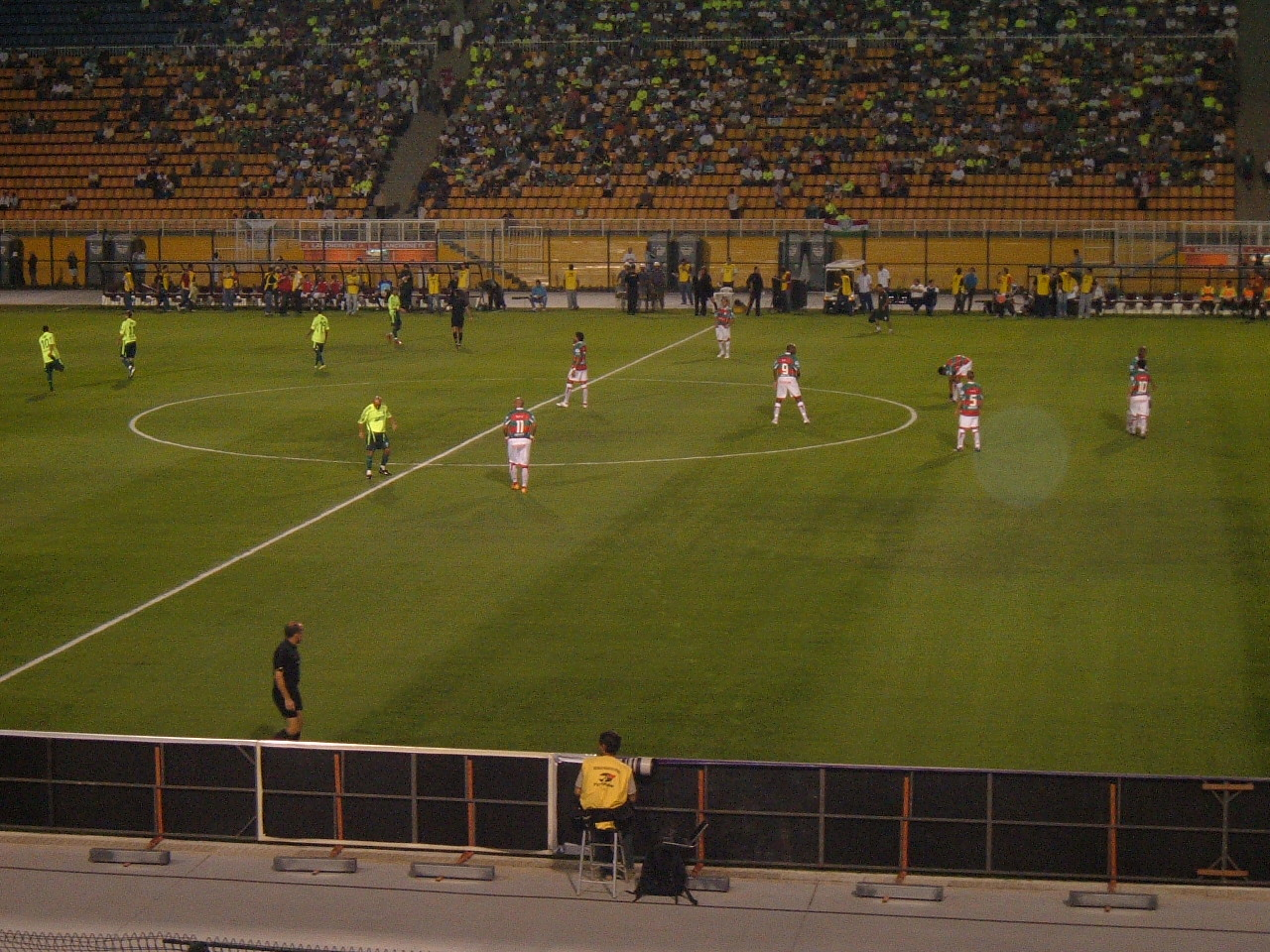
Palmeiras and Portuguesa in action in the Campeonato Brasileiro 2008 at the Estádio do Pacaembu.

=== Major titles ===
- Campeonato Brasileiro Série B: Winners (1)

2011 (Note: It was Portuguesa's first national title in their history.)

- Campeonato Paulista: Winners (3)

1935 (Note: Portuguesa won the tournament organized by Associação Paulista de Esportes Atléticos, while Santos won the other which was organized by Federação Paulista de Futebol.)

1936 (Note: Portuguesa won the tournament organized by Associação Paulista de Esportes Atléticos, while Palestra Itália won the other which was organized by Federação Paulista de Futebol.)

1973 (Note: Split with Santos.)

- Torneio Rio – São Paulo: Winners (2)

1952

1955

- Campeonato Paulista Série A2: Winners (3)

2007

2013

2022

=== Minor titles ===
- Fita Azul: (Note: The Fita Azul was an honour given by Confederação Brasileira de Desportos to the teams who returned to Brazil unbeaten after a period playing friendlies in Europe.) Winners (3)
1951 matches

Portuguesa 3–1 Fenerbahçe
Portuguesa 4–2 Galastasaray
Portuguesa 4–1 Besiktas
Portuguesa 3–1 Seleção de Ankara
Portuguesa 3–1 Galastasary
Portuguesa 4–3 Atlético de Madrid
Portuguesa 1–1 Valencia
Portuguesa 5–3 Helsingborgs
Portuguesa 1–0 Sondra
Portuguesa 2–0 Kanraten
Portuguesa 4–2 Goteborg
Portuguesa 3–2 Norrkoping

1953 matches

Portuguesa 4–0 Alianza Lima
Portuguesa 1–1 Deportivo Municipal
Portuguesa 2–0 Sport Boys del Callao
Portuguesa 3–1 Universitario de Desportes Lima
Portuguesa 3–0 Alianza Lima
Portuguesa 4–2 Independiente de Santa Fé
Portuguesa 1–1 Atlético Nacional
Portuguesa 2–1 Millionarios
Portuguesa 0–0 Independiente de Santa Fé
Portuguesa 2–0 Barcelona de Guayaquil

1954 matches

Portuguesa 5–2 Watford
Portuguesa 2–0 Lufton Town
Portuguesa 0–0 Tilleur
Portuguesa 0–0 Royal Charleroi Sporting Club
Portuguesa 1–0 Angers Sporting Club
Portuguesa 3–1 Stade de Reims
Portuguesa 3–2 Rot-Weiss
Portuguesa 4–1 Borussia Monchengladbach
Portuguesa 4–0 Besiktas
Portuguesa 0–0 Fernebahçe
Portuguesa 1–1 Adalet
Portuguesa 0–0 Vefa
Portuguesa 2–1 Galastasaray
Portuguesa 2–1 Fortuna Dusseldorf
Portuguesa 4–2 Schartz
Portuguesa 2–1 Schalke 04
Portuguesa 1–0 Tenis Borussia Berlin
Portuguesa 2–0 Verein Fur
Portuguesa 6–0 Sheffield Wednesday

- Torneio Sócrates: (Note: Friendly played between Portuguesa and Corinthians in honour of Sócrates.) Winners (1)

1–0 Corinthians (18/01/2012)

Other titles

- (Spain) Taça San Izidro: 1951
- (Turkey) Torneio Quadrangular de Istambul: 1972
- Torneio Internacional do Estádio do Canindé (Torneio dos Refletores): 1981
- (Bahia) Torneio Quadrangular de Salvador: 1951
- (Minas Gerais) Torneio de Belo Horizonte: 1951
- Torneio Oswaldo Teixeira Duarte (Goiás): 1971
- Taça Governador do Estado de São Paulo: 1976
- Taça Estado de São Paulo: 1973
- Torneio Início Paulista: 1935, 1947, 1996
- Taça Mário Soares: 1987
- Taça dos Invictos: 1955, 1974

=== Youth team honours ===
- Copa São Paulo de Futebol Júnior: 1991, 2002
- Campeonato Paulista sub-20: 1990, 2010
- Campeonato Paulista sub-15: 2002, 2004

== Rankings ==
- Campeonato Brasileiro Série A historical ranking:

Pos	Team	Pts	Pld	W	D	L	GF	GA	GD	A
20th	Portuguesa	854	735	246	231	258	887	881	6	31

- Campeonato Brasileiro Série B historical ranking:

Pos	Team	Pts	Pld	W	D	L	GF	GA	GD	A
14th	Portuguesa	452	295	128	79	88	464	372	92	11

Campeonato Paulista Série A1
Campeonato Paulista Série A2

(São Paulo (state)) Campeonato Paulista
Year	1920	1921	1922	1923	1924	1925	1926	1927	1928	1929
Pos.	9th	8th	10th	5th	8th	7th	6th	5th	5th	4th
Year	1930	1931	1932	1933	1934	1935	1936	1937	1938	1939
Pos.	5th	5th	5th	3rd	3rd	1st	1st	—	7th	3rd
Year	1940	1941	1942	1943	1944	1945	1946	1947	1948	1949
Pos.	2nd	4th	8th	7th	9th	4th	3rd	3rd	5th	3rd
Year	1950	1951	1952	1953	1954	1955	1956	1957	1958	1959
Pos.	4th	3rd	3rd	4th	5th	5th	5th	4th	6th	6th
Year	1960	1961	1962	1963	1964	1965	1966	1967	1968	1969
Pos.	2nd	4th	5th	12th	3rd	4th	6th	5th	4th	5th
Year	1970	1971	1972	1973	1974	1975	1976	1977	1978	1979
Pos.	7th	3rd	5th	1st	5th	2nd	8th	8th	10th	8th
Year	1980	1981	1982	1983	1984	1985	1986	1987	1988	1989
Pos.	5th	9th	11th	6th	14th	2nd	5th	6th	9th	5th
Year	1990	1991	1992	1993	1994	1995	1996	1997	1998	1999
Pos.	8th	4th	4th	17th	8th	3rd	3rd	5th	3rd	5th
Year	2000	2001	2002	2003	2004	2005	2006	2007	2008	2009
Pos.	5th	9th	—	12th	17th	10th	18th	1st	11th	5th
Year	2010	2011	2012	2013	2014	2015	2016	2017	2018	2019
Pos.	6th	8th	17th	1st	12th	18th	13th	13th	12th	11th
Year	2020
Pos.

- Campeonato Paulista appearances: 92
- Campeonato Paulista Série A2 appearances: 7
- Copa do Brasil appearances: 15
- Torneio Rio – São Paulo appearances: 19
- Copa CONMEBOL appearances: 1
- Copa Sudamericana appearances: 1

== Landmarks ==
- 1920: Foundation;
- 1935: APEA's Campeonato Paulista winners;
- 1936: APEA's Campeonato Paulista winners;
- 1951: Fita Azul winners;
- 1952: Torneio Rio – São Paulo winners;
- 1953: Fita Azul winners;
- 1954: Fita Azul winners;
- 1955: Torneio Rio – São Paulo winners;
- 1973: Campeonato Paulista winners;
- 1981: Campeonato Brasileiro Série A relegation;
- 1983: Campeonato Brasileiro Série B promotion;
- 2002: Campeonato Brasileiro Série A relegation;
- 2006: Campeonato Paulista relegation;
- 2006: Campeonato Brasileiro Série B promotion;
- 2007: Campeonato Paulista Série A2 winners (promotion);
- 2008: Campeonato Brasileiro Série A relegation;
- 2011: Campeonato Brasileiro Série B winners (promotion);
- 2012: Campeonato Paulista relegation;
- 2013: Campeonato Paulista Série A2 winners (promotion);
- 2013: Campeonato Brasileiro Série A relegation;
- 2014: Campeonato Brasileiro Série B relegation;
- 2015: Campeonato Paulista relegation;
- 2016: Campeonato Brasileiro Série C relegation;
- 2017: Campeonato Brasileiro Série D relegation (no division status for the following year);
- 2020: Copa Paulista winners (Série D 2021);
- 2021: Campeonato Brasileiro Série D relegation (no division status for the following year);
- 2022: Campeonato Paulista Série A2 winners (promotion).
