= Edson Pimenta =

Brazilian association football manager

Personal information
- Full name: Edson Pimenta Bueno Filho
- Date of birth: 1 November 1951 (age 74)

Managerial career
- Years: Team
- 2013: Portuguesa (caretaker)
- 2013: Portuguesa

Edson Pimenta Bueno Filho (born 1 November 1951) is a Brazilian professional football manager and a former Military Police lieutenant colonel. He was most recently the youth coordinator for Santos.

Pimenta graduated from the Barro Branco Military Police Academy in 1974 and subsequently pursued his interest in sports by completing a technical course at the University of São Paulo in 1979. His association with Portuguesa has been significant throughout his football career, having held different positions at the club since 1981. As an interim coach, he took Lusa to the 2013 Campeonato Paulista Série A2 title. However, while serving in the police force, Pimenta encountered controversies related to disciplinary matters.

== Police service ==
Lieutenant Colonel Edson Pimenta served in the 5th Metropolitan Police Battalion of São Paulo and encountered some incidents that generated controversy during his career as a police officer. In 1997, he became the subject of an investigation related to the Favela Naval case. During his time in the 8th Battalion, Pimenta faced accusations of delay in forwarding a complaint filed by police officers involved in the case. However, the complaint was eventually closed without further action.

In 2000, Pimenta faced an indictment by Internal Affairs following the release of recorded conversations in which he made derogatory remarks about then-governor Mário Covas, referring to him as a "puppet." He also made disparaging comments about Marco Vinício Petreluzi, the Secretary of Public Safety, using terms such as "idiot" and "hypocrite." Additionally, Pimenta directed profane language towards Benedito Mariano, the ombudsman for the São Paulo State Military Police.

== Football career ==
Pimenta's involvement in professional football commenced in 1981 when, during a training session with the Military Police Sportive Association for an amateur tournament, he was approached by Luis Iaúca, who was the vice-president of Portuguesa, who extended an invitation to join the club as a physical trainer for the under-20 team.

After spending two years with the youth team, Pimenta transitioned to working with the senior squad, alongside Paulo Autuori. However, he had to relinquish his position due to his responsibilities as a military police officer.

In 1988, Pimenta returned to the club, assuming the role of youth coordinator. In this capacity, he played a crucial role in identifying and nurturing talented players, such as Denner and Sinval, and promoting them to the main squad. However, in 1991, he once again departed from the club to focus on his duties within the police force.

Back at Lusa in 1994, he became an assistant coach under Candinho. In addition to his involvement with Portuguesa, Edson Pimenta also served as an assistant coach alongside Candinho at various clubs, including Corinthians, Bahia, Goiás, Palmeiras, and Al Hilal and Al Ittihad in Saudi Arabia. In December 2011, Pimenta was appointed as an assistant coach for Jamelli at Marcílio Dias.

=== Portuguesa ===
In April 2012, Pimenta made his return to Lusa, having joined the club's permanent staff. On 15 April 2013, Pimenta was appointed caretaker manager of Portuguesa following the dismissal of Péricles Chamusca, sacked after a crushing 7–0 loss to Comercial.

On 16 April 2013, Edson Pimenta took charge of Portuguesa for the first time, in a match against Naviraiense at Canindé, for Copa do Brasil first stage. The game ended in a 1–1 draw, resulting in Portuguesa's elimination based on the away goals rule.

Following this, Pimenta achieved a series of positive results, securing four consecutive victories in the closing stages of the Campeonato Paulista Série A2. This successful run culminated in winning the championship, with Lusa triumphing over Rio Claro in the finals.

Initially, the board had anticipated Pimenta's presence for only the first five rounds of the Campeonato Brasileiro Série A. However, after a win against reigning champions Fluminense on 17 June, Pimenta's contract was extended until the end of the year. Following their debut defeat against Vasco da Gama, Portuguesa managed to maintain an unbeaten streak of four matches.

This victory over Fluminense would be Pimenta's last. After a string of three defeats and with the club languishing at the bottom of the table, he was fired on 28 July 2013, a little over a month after taking charge. Pimenta oversaw 16 games during his tenure at Portuguesa, securing five wins, six draws, and five defeats.

=== Santos ===
In October 2020, Pimenta was appointed as the youth coordinator at Santos, as a component of president Orlando Rollo's restructuring initiative. However, his tenure in this role was short-lived, as he was terminated from the position after three months.

== Honours ==
=== Manager ===
Portuguesa

- Campeonato Paulista Série A2: 2013
