= 2020 Campeonato Paulista Série A2 =

São Paulo state professional football championship

Campeonato Paulista Série A2
- Season: 2020
- Dates: 22 January 2020 – 12 October 2020
- Champions: São Caetano
- Promoted: São Caetano; São Bento
- Relegated: Votuporanguense; Penapolense
- Matches: 134
- Goals: 311 (2.32 per match)
- Top goalscorer: Léo Castro; Bambam (9 goals)
- Biggest home win: Monte Azul 6–0 Atibaia (21 February)
- Biggest away win: Votuporanguense 0–4 Juventus (21 February)
- Highest scoring: São Caetano 4–3 São Bernardo (20 August)
- Longest winning run: 7 matches São Bento
- Longest unbeaten run: 10 matches São Bento
- Longest winless run: 10 matches Sertãozinho
- Longest losing run: 5 matches Portuguesa Santista
- Highest attendance: 3,111; Portuguesa 2–0 XV de Piracicaba (22 January)
- Lowest attendance: 40; Atibaia 0–0 Audax (14 March)
- Total attendance: 92,334
- Average attendance: 982
- All statistics correct as of 30 September 2020.

The 2020 Campeonato Paulista Série A2 was the 27th season of the second level of the São Paulo state league under its current title and the 97th season overall.

Due to the ongoing COVID-19 pandemic, the season was indefinitely suspended on 16 March. Play was resumed on 19 August. São Caetano and São Bento, two sides relegated from the first division in the previous season, won promotion back after one year. São Caetano were crowned champions on 12 October, after defeating the Sorocaba team 4–3 on penalties in the final, following a 3–3 aggregate score. São Caetano had already won the trophy in their last appearance in the second level, in 2017.

== Team changes ==
The following teams have changed division since the 2019 season.

=== To Série A2 ===
Promoted from Série A3

- Audax
- Monte Azul

Relegated from Série A1

- Red Bull Brasil
- São Caetano
- São Bento

=== From Série A2 ===
Promoted to Série A1

- Santo André
- Internacional de Limeira
- Água Santa

Relegated to Série A3

- Nacional
- Linense

== Stadiums ==
Locations of the 2020 Paulistão A2 teams

Club	Location	Stadium	Capacity
Atibaia	Atibaia	Décio Vitta (Note: Atibaia plays at Americana, 90 kilometres away from Atibaia, as their home stadium Estádio Salvador Russani does not meet the minimum criteria for hosting Série A2 matches)	8,712
Audax	Osasco	Prefeito José Liberatti	12,158
Juventus	São Paulo (Mooca)	Rua Javari	5,256
Monte Azul	Monte Azul Paulista	Otacília Patrício Arroyo	8,000
Penapolense	Penápolis	Tenente Carriço	9,998
Portuguesa	São Paulo (Pari)	Canindé	22,375
Portuguesa Santista	Santos	Ulrico Mursa	12,578
Red Bull Brasil	Campinas	Moisés Lucarelli	19,221
Rio Claro	Rio Claro	Augusto Schmidt	5,900
São Bento	Sorocaba	Walter Ribeiro	11,861
São Bernardo	São Bernardo do Campo	1º de Maio	12,578
São Caetano	São Caetano do Sul	Anacleto Campanella	17,530
Sertãozinho	Sertãozinho	Frederico Dalmaso	6,000
Taubaté	Taubaté	Joaquinzão	9,600
Votuporanguense	Votuporanga	Plínio Marin	7,560
XV de Piracicaba	Piracicaba	Barão da Serra Negra	18,000

== League table ==
Pos	Team	Pld	W	D	L	GF	GA	GD	Pts	Qualification or relegation
1	São Caetano (C)	21	11	4	6	33	23	+10	37	Promoted to Campeonato Paulista Série A1
2	São Bento (P)	21	10	5	6	29	24	+5	35	Promoted to Campeonato Paulista Série A1
3	São Bernardo	19	9	6	4	22	16	+6	33	Qualified for the semifinals
4	XV de Piracicaba	19	8	6	5	22	19	+3	30	Qualified for the semifinals
5	Portuguesa	17	8	3	6	16	12	+4	27	Eliminated the quarterfinals
6	Taubaté	17	7	5	5	16	17	−1	26	Eliminated the quarterfinals
7	Monte Azul	17	7	4	6	26	18	+8	25	Eliminated the quarterfinals
8	Juventus	17	6	6	5	21	19	+2	24	Eliminated the quarterfinals
9	Portuguesa Santista	15	6	2	7	18	18	0	20	
10	Rio Claro	15	5	4	6	15	15	0	19	
11	Atibaia	15	4	6	5	18	22	−4	18	
12	Sertãozinho	15	3	8	4	16	18	−2	17	
13	Audax	15	3	6	6	15	22	−7	15	
14	Red Bull Brasil	15	3	4	8	15	24	−9	13	
15	Votuporanguense (R)	15	3	4	8	14	23	−9	13	Relegation to 2021 Campeonato Paulista Série A3
16	Penapolense (R)	15	3	3	9	15	21	−6	12	Relegation to 2021 Campeonato Paulista Série A3

Updated to match(es) played on 29 October 2020. Source: Paulista Série A2 (in Portuguese), Soccerway
Rules for classification: 1st points; 2nd wins; 3rd goal difference; 4th goals scored; 5th least yellow cards received; 6th least red cards received; 7th draw.
(C) Champions; (P) Promoted; (R) Relegated

== Knockout stage ==
=== Bracket ===
Quarterfinals
8	Juventus	1	0	1 (5)
1	São Bernardo (p)	1	0	1 (6)
5	Taubaté	0	1	1 (7)
4	São Bento (p)	0	1	1 (8)
7	Monte Azul	0	1	1 (4)
2	São Caetano (p)	1	0	1 (5)
6	XV de Piracicaba	3	1	4
3	Portuguesa	2	0	2

Semifinals
3	São Bento	3	0	3
2	São Bernardo	0	2	2
4	XV de Piracicaba	0	1	1
1	São Caetano	0	2	2

Finals
2	São Bento	2	1	3 (3)
1	São Caetano (p)	3	0	3 (4)

== Season statistics ==
=== Top scorers ===
As of 29 October 2020

Rank	Player	Club	Goals
1	(Brazil) Léo Castro	Juventus	9
1	(Brazil) Bambam	São Bento	9
3	(Brazil) Marcos Paulo	Monte Azul	8
3	(Brazil) Marlyson	São Bernardo	8
5	(Brazil) Kalil	Portuguesa Santista	6
