= André Cunha (Brazilian footballer) =

Brazilian footballer (born 1979)

Personal information
- Full name: André Gustavo Cunha
- Date of birth: 8 April 1979 (age 47)
- Place of birth: Araçatuba, Brazil
- Height: 1.79 m (5 ft 10 in)
- Position: Right-back

Team information
- Current team: Penapolense

Senior career*
Years	Team	Apps	(Gls)
1999–2001	Penapolense		
2001–2002	Araçatuba		
2002	Bandeirante		
2002–2003	Araçatuba		
2004	Ponte Preta		
2005	Palmeiras		
2006	→ Fortaleza (loan)		
2007	→ Ponte Preta (loan)		
2007	→ Grêmio Barueri (loan)		
2008	Rio Claro		
2008–2009	Libolo		
2010	Monte Azul		
2010	CRB		
2011–2012	XV de Piracicaba		
2013	União Barbarense		
2013	Araçatuba		
2014	São Bento		
2015	Matonense		
2016	Batatais		
2016–2017	Penapolense		
- * Club domestic league appearances and goals as of 7 March 2017

André Gustavo Cunha (born April 8, 1979 in Araçatuba), known as André Cunha, is a Brazilian footballer who plays for Penapolense as right-back.

== Career statistics ==
As of 7 March 2017

Club	Season	League			State League		Cup		Conmebol		Other		Total	
Club	Season	Division	Apps	Goals	Apps	Goals	Apps	Goals	Apps	Goals	Apps	Goals	Apps	Goals
Ponte Preta	2004	Série A	41	3	1	1	—		—		—		42	4
Palmeiras	2005	Série A	14	0	5	0	—		3	0	—		22	0
Fortaleza	2006	Série A	23	5	—		4	0	—		—		27	5
Rio Claro	2008	Paulista	—		10	0	—		—		—		10	0
Monte Azul	2010	Paulista	—		13	0	—		—		—		13	0
CRB	2010	Série C	5	1	—		—		—		—		5	1
XV de Piracicaba	2011	Paulista A2	—		23	6	—		—		19 (Note: All appearance(s) in Copa Paulista)	3	42	9
XV de Piracicaba	2012	Paulista	—		16	3	—		—		19	2	35	5
XV de Piracicaba	Subtotal		—		39	9	—		—		38	5	77	14
União Barbarense	2013	Paulista	—		8	0	—		—		—		8	0
São Bento	2014	Paulista A2	—		11	1	—		—		—		11	1
Matonense	2015	Paulista A2	—		9	0	—		—		—		9	0
Batatais	2016	Paulista A2	—		18	1	—		—		—		18	1
Penapolense	2016	Paulista A2	—		—		—		—		15	6	15	6
Penapolense	2017	Paulista A2	—		7	1	—		—		—		7	1
Penapolense	Subtotal		—		7	1	—		—		15	6	22	7
Career total			83	9	121	13	4	0	3	0	53	11	264	33
