= Marcelo Godri =

Brazilian footballer

Personal information
- Full name: Marcelo Godri
- Date of birth: 20 February 1987 (age 39)
- Place of birth: Blumenau, Brazil
- Height: 1.84 m (6 ft 1/2 in)
- Position: Defender

Team information
- Current team: Votuporanguense

Senior career*
Years	Team	Apps	(Gls)
2007–2008	Corinthians		
2008	→ Bragantino (loan)		
2009–2010	Bragantino		
2010–2011	Santo André		
2011–2012	São Bernardo		
2013	Monte Azul		
2013–2014	Grêmio Osasco		
2013	→ Grêmio Barueri (loan)		
2014	→ Audax (loan)		
2014	Concórdia		
2015	Treze		
2016	Taubaté		
2016–	Votuporanguense		
- * Club domestic league appearances and goals as of 17 March 2017

Marcelo Godri (born February 20, 1987, in Blumenau) is a Brazilian footballer who plays for Votuporanguense as defender.

== Career statistics ==
As of 17 March 2017

Club	Season	League			State League		Cup		Conmebol		Other		Total	
Club	Season	Division	Apps	Goals	Apps	Goals	Apps	Goals	Apps	Goals	Apps	Goals	Apps	Goals
Bragantino	2009	Série B	24	2	14	4	—		—		—		38	6
Bragantino	2010	Série B	—		18	1	—		—		—		18	1
Bragantino	Subtotal		24	2	32	5	—		—		—		56	7
Santo André	2010	Série B	14	1	—		—		—		—		14	1
Santo André	2011	Série C	—		13	1	4	0	—		—		17	1
Santo André	Subtotal		14	1	13	1	4	0	—		—		31	2
São Bernardo	2012	Paulista A2	—		9	0	—		—		—		9	0
Monte Azul	2013	Paulista A2	—		17	0	—		—		—		17	0
Grêmio Barueri	2013	Série C	7	0	—		—		—		—		7	0
Grêmio Osasco	2013	Paulista A2	—		—		—		—		15 (Note: All appearance(s) in Copa Paulista)	1	15	1
Treze	2015	Série D	3	0	—		—		—		—		3	0
Taubaté	2016	Paulista A2	—		16	1	—		—		—		16	1
Votuporanguense	2016	Paulista A2	—		—		—		—		17	0	17	0
Votuporanguense	2017	Paulista A2	—		8	0	—		—		—		8	0
Votuporanguense	Subtotal		—		8	0	—		—		17	0	25	0
Career total			48	3	95	7	4	0	0	0	32	1	179	11
