= Johnny (footballer, born 1987) =

Brazilian footballer

Personal information
- Full name: Johnny da Silva Araújo
- Date of birth: February 19, 1987 (age 39)
- Place of birth: Rio de Janeiro, Brazil
- Height: 1.80 m (5 ft 11 in)
- Position: Forward

Team information
- Current team: Monte Azul
- Number: 20

Youth career
- Corinthians

Senior career*
Years	Team	Apps	(Gls)
2006–2007	America-RJ		
2007	→ Juventus-SP (loan)		
2008	Rio Preto		
2008	Villa Nova		
2009	Bragantino	8	(1)
2010	Maranguape	8	(0)
2010	Canoas	6	(0)
2011–	Monte Azul	4	(0)

International career
2005	Brazil U-23	4	(0)
- * Club domestic league appearances and goals

Johnny da Silva Araújo or simply Johnny (born February 19, 1987), is a Brazilian footballer, who plays as a forward for Atlético Monte Azul.
