= Taça Piratininga =

- Organising body: FPF
- Founded: 1963
- Abolished: 1971
- Region: São Paulo, Brazil
- Number of teams: 4
- Related competitions: Campeonato Paulista
- Most successful club(s): São Paulo (4 titles)

The Taça Piratininga (English: Piratininga Cup) was a tournament organized by Federação Paulista de Futebol (FPF), reuniting the four most important teams from the city of São Paulo (Corinthians, Palmeiras, Portuguesa and São Paulo) to decide the champion of the city based on their performance in the respective editions of the Campeonato Paulista each season.

São Paulo took permanent possession of the trophy after winning it four times.

== List of champions ==
Following is the list with all the champions of the Taça Piratininga:

Season	Champions
1963	Palmeiras (1)
1964	Portuguesa (1)
1965	Palmeiras (2)
1966	Palmeiras (3)
1967	São Paulo (1)
1968	Corinthians (1)
1969	São Paulo (2)
1970	São Paulo (3)
1971	São Paulo (4)

== Titles by team ==
Rank	Club	Winners	Winning years
1	São Paulo	4	1967, 1969, 1970, 1971
2	Palmeiras	3	1963, 1965, 1966
3	Corinthians	1	1968
3	Portuguesa	1	1964
