= 2011 Campeonato Paulista =

Campeonato Paulista - Série A1
- Season: 2011
- Champions: Santos (19th title)
- Relegated: São Bernardo; Prudente; Noroeste; Santo André
- Matches: 202
- Goals: 513 (2.54 per match)
- Top goalscorer: Liédson; Elano (11)
- Biggest home win: São Caetano 6–1 São Bernardo
- Biggest away win: Ituano 1–5 Americana; Santo André 0–4 Paulista; Botafogo–SP 0–4 Linense
- Highest scoring: Americana 3–4 São Paulo (7 goals)
- Longest winning run: 5 games Palmeiras (2nd round - 7th round); Ponte Preta (8th round - 12th round)
- Longest unbeaten run: 11 games Corinthians (1st round - 11th round); Palmeiras (8th round - 18th round); Ponte Preta (3rd round - 13th round)
- Longest winless run: 11 games Santo André (1st round - 11th round)
- Longest losing run: 6 games Americana (10th round - 15th round)

The 2011 Campeonato Paulista de Futebol Profissional da Primeira Divisão - Série A1 (officially the Paulistão Chevrolet 2012 for sponsorship reasons) was the 110th season of São Paulo's top professional football league.

Santos won the championship after beating Corinthians 2–1 on aggregate in the finals, winning their 19th title.

== Format ==
The top eight teams in the First Stage qualifies to the Quarter-Finals. The bottom four teams will be relegated to the Série A2. Quarter and Semi-Finals will be played in one-legged matches. The best-four teams not qualified to the Semi-Finals not from the city of São Paulo or Santos FC, will compete in the Campeonato do Interior.

== Teams ==
| Club | Home city | 2010 result |
|---|---|---|
| Americana | Americana | 3rd (Série A2) |
| Botafogo–SP | Ribeirão Preto | 7th |
| Bragantino | Bragança Paulista | 16th |
| Corinthians | São Paulo (Tatuapé) | 5th |
| Grêmio Prudente | Presidente Prudente | 3rd |
| Ituano | Itu | 13th |
| Linense | Lins | 1st (Série A2) |
| Mirassol | Mirassol | 14th |
| Mogi Mirim | Mogi Mirim | 12th |
| Noroeste | Bauru | 2nd (Série A2) |
| Oeste | Itápolis | 9th |
| Palmeiras | São Paulo (Perdizes) | 11th |
| Paulista | Jundiaí | 15th |
| Ponte Preta | Campinas | 10th |
| Portuguesa | São Paulo (Pari) | 6th |
| Santo André | Santo André | 2nd |
| Santos | Santos | 1st |
| São Bernardo | São Bernardo do Campo | 4th (Série A2) |
| São Caetano | São Caetano do Sul | 8th |
| São Paulo | São Paulo (Morumbi) | 4th |

== First stage ==
=== League table ===
| Pos | Team | Pld | W | D | L | GF | GA | GD | Pts | Qualification or relegation |
|---|---|---|---|---|---|---|---|---|---|---|
| 1 | São Paulo | 19 | 13 | 2 | 4 | 39 | 19 | +20 | 41 | Advanced to the Knockout stage |
| 2 | Palmeiras | 19 | 12 | 5 | 2 | 28 | 8 | +20 | 41 | Advanced to the Knockout stage |
| 3 | Corinthians | 19 | 11 | 5 | 3 | 33 | 12 | +21 | 38 | Advanced to the Knockout stage |
| 4 | Santos | 19 | 11 | 5 | 3 | 40 | 20 | +20 | 38 | Advanced to the Knockout stage |
| 5 | Ponte Preta | 19 | 9 | 5 | 5 | 22 | 16 | +6 | 32 | Advanced to the Knockout stage |
| 6 | Oeste | 19 | 9 | 4 | 6 | 25 | 17 | +8 | 31 | Advanced to the Knockout stage |
| 7 | Mirassol | 19 | 9 | 3 | 7 | 26 | 26 | 0 | 30 | Advanced to the Knockout stage |
| 8 | Portuguesa | 19 | 8 | 4 | 7 | 24 | 23 | +1 | 28 | Advanced to the Knockout stage |
| 9 | São Caetano | 19 | 7 | 5 | 7 | 22 | 22 | 0 | 26 | Advanced to the Campeonato do Interior |
| 10 | Paulista | 19 | 7 | 4 | 8 | 23 | 24 | −1 | 25 | |
| 11 | Mogi Mirim | 19 | 7 | 4 | 8 | 24 | 28 | −4 | 25 | |
| 12 | Americana | 19 | 7 | 2 | 10 | 20 | 19 | +1 | 23 | |
| 13 | Botafogo–SP | 19 | 5 | 7 | 7 | 22 | 27 | −5 | 22 | |
| 14 | Linense | 19 | 6 | 3 | 10 | 23 | 31 | −8 | 21 | |
| 15 | Bragantino | 19 | 5 | 4 | 10 | 21 | 30 | −9 | 19 | |
| 16 | Ituano | 19 | 5 | 3 | 11 | 21 | 33 | −12 | 18 | |
| 17 | São Bernardo | 19 | 5 | 3 | 11 | 21 | 35 | −14 | 18 | Relegation to Campeonato Paulista Série A2 |
| 18 | Grêmio Prudente | 19 | 4 | 5 | 10 | 21 | 35 | −14 | 17 | Relegation to Campeonato Paulista Série A2 |
| 19 | Noroeste | 19 | 3 | 8 | 8 | 21 | 33 | −12 | 17 | Relegation to Campeonato Paulista Série A2 |
| 20 | Santo André | 19 | 2 | 9 | 8 | 14 | 29 | −15 | 15 | Relegation to Campeonato Paulista Série A2 |

Updated to match(es) played on 17 April 2011. Source: UOL Esporte
Rules for classification: 1st points; 2nd wins; 3rd goal difference; 4th goals scored; 5th red cards received; 6th yellow cards received; 7th public draw

=== Results ===
| Home \ Away | AMC | BRP | BRG | COR | ITU | LIN | MIR | MOG | NOR | OES | PAL | PAU | PPR | POR | GPR | SAD | SAN | SBE | SCA | SPL |
|---|---|---|---|---|---|---|---|---|---|---|---|---|---|---|---|---|---|---|---|---|
| Americana | | 2–1 | 1–0 | | 2–0 | | | 0–1 | | 1–1 | | 0–2 | | | | | 0–0 | 3–1 | | 3–4 |
| Botafogo–SP | | | 1–1 | 0–0 | | 0–4 | 3–0 | | 2–2 | | | 2–1 | | 1–4 | | 1–0 | | | 1–1 | 2–1 |
| Bragantino | | | | 1–1 | 2–1 | | 1–2 | 2–3 | | | | 0–1 | 0–1 | | | 2–1 | 2–1 | 3–0 | | |
| Corinthians | 1–0 | | | | 4–0 | | | 2–0 | 1–1 | 3–0 | | | 0–1 | 2–0 | 4–0 | | 3–1 | | 1–2 | |
| Ituano | | 3–1 | | | | 3–3 | | 0–1 | 2–0 | 2–3 | 1–4 | | | 0–0 | | | 2–3 | 2–0 | | |
| Linense | 0–2 | | 2–1 | 0–2 | | | | | 2–0 | | | 3–2 | | 1–3 | 0–1 | | 1–4 | 0–2 | | |
| Mirassol | 2–0 | | | 2–3 | 3–0 | 2–0 | | | 2–2 | | 0–1 | | 2–1 | | | 1–1 | 0–3 | | 3–1 | |
| Mogi Mirim | | 1–1 | | | | 0–1 | 0–1 | | | | 0–0 | | | 1–3 | 3–1 | 1–1 | | | 1–2 | 0–2 |
| Noroeste | 1–5 | | 2–2 | | | | | 4–1 | | | 1–2 | | 1–0 | | 2–2 | 2–2 | | | 0–0 | 1–4 |
| Oeste | | 1–0 | 2–0 | | | 1–0 | 0–1 | 1–1 | 4–0 | | 0–1 | | 2–1 | | | | 0–2 | | 3–0 | |
| Palmeiras | 1–0 | 0–0 | 3–0 | 0–1 | | 3–0 | | | | | | 3–1 | | | 2–0 | 0–0 | | 2–0 | | |
| Paulista | | | | 0–0 | 2–1 | | 0–2 | 2–3 | 0–0 | 1–0 | | | | 0–1 | | | | 1–1 | | 3–2 |
| Ponte Preta | 1–0 | 3–1 | | | 1–2 | 1–1 | | 0–2 | | | 2–1 | 0–0 | | | 1–1 | | 2–2 | | 0–0 | |
| Portuguesa | 1–0 | | 0–0 | | | | 4–1 | | 0–2 | 1–0 | 0–2 | | 1–3 | | | 0–0 | | 1–0 | | 2–3 |
| Prudente | 1–0 | 1–1 | 2–4 | | 1–0 | | 1–1 | | | 0–2 | | 1–2 | | 3–3 | | | 2–4 | | | 0–1 |
| Santo André | 1–0 | | | 0–2 | 1–1 | 1–1 | | | | 2–2 | | 0–4 | 0–2 | | 1–3 | | 1–1 | | 1–0 | |
| Santos | | 2–1 | | | | | 3–0 | 3–1 | 2–0 | | 0–1 | 3–0 | | 3–0 | | | | 1–1 | 3–3 | 2–0 |
| São Bernardo | | 0–2 | | 2–2 | | | 4–1 | 2–4 | 2–0 | 0–2 | | | 0–1 | | 3–1 | 2–1 | | | | |
| São Caetano | 0–1 | | 2–0 | | 0–1 | 0–2 | | | | | 1–1 | 2–1 | | 1–0 | 1–0 | | | 6–1 | | 0–2 |
| São Paulo | | | 4–0 | 2–1 | 2–0 | 3–2 | 1–0 | | | 1–1 | 1–1 | | 0–1 | | | 3–0 | | 3–0 | * | |

Updated to match(es) played on 17 April 2011. Source: Futpédia
Legend: Blue = home team win; Yellow = draw; Red = away team win.

== Knockout stage ==
=== Bracket ===
Quarterfinals
1 | São Paulo | 2
8 | Portuguesa | 0
4 | Santos | 1
5 | Ponte Preta | 0
2 | Palmeiras | 2
7 | Mirassol | 1
3 | Corinthians | 2
6 | Oeste | 1

Semifinals
1 | São Paulo | 0
4 | Santos | 2
2 | Palmeiras | 1(5)
3 | Corinthians | 1(6)

Final
4 | Santos | 0 | 2 | 2
3 | Corinthians | 0 | 1 | 1

=== Quarter-finals ===
| Team 1 | Score | Team 2 |
|---|---|---|
| São Paulo | 2–0 | Portuguesa |
| Santos | 1–0 | Ponte Preta |
| Palmeiras | 2–1 | Mirassol |
| Corinthians | 2–1 | Oeste |

=== Semi-finals ===
| Team 1 | Score | Team 2 |
|---|---|---|
| São Paulo | 0–2 | Santos |
| Corinthians | 1–1 (6–5p) | Palmeiras |

=== Finals ===
| Team 1 | Agg. | Team 2 | 1st leg | 2nd leg |
|---|---|---|---|---|
| Corinthians | 1–2 | Santos | 0–0 | 1–2 |

== Campeonato do Interior ==
=== Semifinals ===
29 April
21:00 UTC-03:00

| Oeste | 1 – 0 | Mirassol |
|---|---|---|
| Anselmo Ramon 43' | Report |

Amaros, Itápolis
Attendance: 1,237
Referee: Marcelo Aparecido Ribeiro de Souza

30 April
18:30 UTC-03:00

| Ponte Preta | 0 – 0 | São Caetano |
|---|---|---|
| | Report |
Penalties
| Leandro Silva (penalty scored); Josimar (penalty scored); Rômulo (penalty scored); Guilherme Andrade (penalty scored) | 4–1 | (penalty scored) Souza |

Moisés Lucarelli, Campinas
Attendance: 2,223
Referee: Magno de Sousa Lima Neto

=== Finals ===
4 May
19:30 UTC-03:00
1st leg

| Ponte Preta | 2 – 1 | Oeste |
|---|---|---|
| Ferron 62'; Guilherme Andrade 90+1' | Report | Mazinho 80' |

Moisés Lucarelli, Campinas
Attendance: 2,841
Referee: Marcelo Rogério

7 May
18:30 UTC-03:00
2nd leg

| Oeste | 3 – 0 | Ponte Preta |
|---|---|---|
| Anselmo Ramon 47', 68'; Fernandinho 90+2' | Report |

Amaros, Itápolis
Attendance: 2,549
Referee: Jose Claudio Rocha Filho

== Statistics ==
=== Top goalscorers ===
| Rank | Name | Club | Goals |
|---|---|---|---|
| 1 | (Brazil) Elano | Santos | 11 |
| 1 | (Portugal) Liédson | Corinthians | 11 |
| 2 | (Brazil) Anselmo Ramon | Oeste | 10 |
| 2 | (Brazil) Fábio Santos | Oeste | 10 |
| 3 | (Brazil) Dagoberto | São Paulo | 9 |
| 4 | (Brazil) Xuxa | Mirassol | 8 |
| 4 | (Brazil) Kléber | Palmeiras | 8 |
| 4 | (Brazil) Eduardo | São Caetano | 8 |
| 5 | (Brazil) Anselmo | Botafogo–SP | 7 |
| 5 | (Brazil) Hernane | Paulista | 7 |
| 5 | (Brazil) Maikon Leite | Santos | 7 |
| 5 | (Brazil) Zé Eduardo | Santos | 7 |
| 6 | (Brazil) Juninho Quixadá | Bragantino | 6 |
| 6 | (Brazil) Patrik | Palmeiras | 6 |
| 6 | (Brazil) Jael | Portuguesa | 6 |
| 6 | (Brazil) Keirrison | Santos | 6 |
| 6 | (Brazil) Rogério Ceni | São Paulo | 6 |

Source: UOL Esporte
Last updated: 15 May 2012

=== Hat-tricks ===
| Player | For | Against | Result | Date |
|---|---|---|---|---|
| (Brazil) Fábio Santos | Oeste | São Caetano | 3–0 | 15 January 2011 |
| (Brazil) Charles | Guaratinguetá | Noroeste | 5–1 | 29 January 2011 |
| (Brazil) Juninho Quixadá | Bragantino | São Bernardo | 3–0 | 3 February 2011 |
| (Brazil) Jael | Portuguesa | Botafogo–SP | 4–1 | 5 March 2011 |
| (Brazil) Eduardo^{1} | São Caetano | São Bernardo | 6–1 | 2 April 2011 |
| (Brazil) Anselmo | Botafogo–SP | Mirassol | 3–0 | 17 April 2011 |

- ^{1} Player scored 5 goals.

== Awards ==
=== Team of the year ===
| Pos. | Player | Club |
|---|---|---|
| GK | (Brazil) Rogério Ceni | São Paulo |
| DF | (Brazil) Cicinho | Palmeiras |
| DF | (Brazil) Edu Dracena | Santos |
| DF | (Brazil) Chicão | Corinthians |
| DF | (Brazil) Léo | Santos |
| MF | (Brazil) Ralf | Corinthians |
| MF | (Brazil) Lucas | São Paulo |
| MF | (Brazil) Elano | Santos |
| FW | (Brazil) Neymar | Santos |
| FW | (Portugal) Liédson | Corinthians |
| FW | (Brazil) Kléber | Palmeiras |

Source Globo Esporte
Last updated: 16 May 2012

=== Player of the Season ===
The Player of the Year was awarded to Neymar.

=== Young Player of the Season ===
The Young Player of the Year was awarded to Lucas.

=== Countryside Best Player of the Season ===
The Countryside Best Player of the Year was awarded to Fábio Santos.

=== Top scorer of the Season ===
The Top scorer award went to Liédson and Elano, who scored 11 goals.

=== Coach of the Season ===
The Coach of the Season award went to Luiz Felipe Scolari.

== Overall table ==
| Pos | Team | Pld | W | D | L | GF | GA | GD | Pts | Qualification or relegation |
|---|---|---|---|---|---|---|---|---|---|---|
| 1 | Santos (C) | 23 | 14 | 6 | 3 | 44 | 21 | +23 | 48 | Finalist and 2012 Copa Libertadores (Note: Santos is qualified for the second stage of the 2012 Copa Libertadores as the 2011 Copa Libertadores champion.) |
| 2 | Corinthians | 23 | 12 | 7 | 4 | 37 | 16 | +21 | 43 | Finalist and 2012 Copa Libertadores (Note: Corinthians is qualified for the second stage of the 2012 Copa Libertadores via 2011 Campeonato Brasileiro Série A) |
| 3 | Palmeiras | 21 | 13 | 6 | 2 | 31 | 10 | +21 | 45 | Eliminated in semifinals and 2012 Copa do Brasil |
| 4 | São Paulo | 21 | 14 | 2 | 5 | 41 | 21 | +20 | 44 | Eliminated in semifinals and 2012 Copa do Brasil |
| 5 | Ponte Preta | 20 | 9 | 5 | 6 | 22 | 17 | +5 | 32 | Eliminated in quarterfinals |
| 6 | Oeste | 20 | 9 | 4 | 7 | 26 | 19 | +7 | 31 | Eliminated in quarterfinals and Série D |
| 7 | Mirassol | 20 | 9 | 3 | 8 | 27 | 28 | −1 | 30 | Eliminated in quarterfinals and Série D |
| 8 | Portuguesa | 20 | 8 | 4 | 8 | 24 | 25 | −1 | 28 | Eliminated in quarterfinals |
| 9 | São Caetano | 19 | 7 | 5 | 7 | 22 | 22 | 0 | 26 | Eliminated in first Stage |
| 10 | Paulista | 19 | 7 | 4 | 8 | 23 | 24 | −1 | 25 | Eliminated in first stage and 2012 Copa do Brasil (Note: Paulista is qualified for 2012 Copa do Brasil as the 2011 Copa Paulista Champions.) |
| 11 | Mogi Mirim | 19 | 7 | 4 | 8 | 24 | 28 | −4 | 25 | Eliminated in first Stage |
| 12 | Americana | 19 | 7 | 2 | 10 | 20 | 19 | +1 | 23 | Eliminated in first Stage |
| 13 | Botafogo–SP | 19 | 5 | 7 | 7 | 22 | 27 | −5 | 22 | Eliminated in first Stage |
| 14 | Linense | 19 | 6 | 3 | 10 | 23 | 31 | −8 | 21 | Eliminated in first Stage |
| 15 | Bragantino | 19 | 5 | 4 | 10 | 21 | 30 | −9 | 19 | Eliminated in first Stage |
| 16 | Ituano | 19 | 5 | 3 | 11 | 21 | 33 | −12 | 18 | Eliminated in first Stage |
| 17 | São Bernardo (R) | 19 | 5 | 3 | 11 | 21 | 35 | −14 | 18 | Relegation to Campeonato Paulista Série A2 |
| 18 | Grêmio Prudente (R) | 19 | 4 | 5 | 10 | 21 | 35 | −14 | 17 | Relegation to Campeonato Paulista Série A2 |
| 19 | Noroeste (R) | 19 | 3 | 8 | 8 | 21 | 33 | −12 | 17 | Relegation to Campeonato Paulista Série A2 |
| 20 | Santo André (R) | 19 | 2 | 9 | 8 | 14 | 29 | −15 | 15 | Relegation to Campeonato Paulista Série A2 |

(C) Champions; (R) Relegated
