= Jean Pablo =

Brazilian footballer

Personal information
- Full name: Jean Pablo Mazaro
- Date of birth: 26 August 1988 (age 38)
- Place of birth: Descalvado, Brazil
- Height: 1.95 m (6 ft 5 in)
- Position: Defender

Team information
- Current team: Grêmio Desportivo Prudente

Youth career
- 2005–2008: Corinthians

Senior career*
Years	Team	Apps	(Gls)
2008–2009	Corinthians		
2008	→ Roma–PR (loan)		
2009	→ Monte Azul (loan)		
2009	→ Ituano (loan)		
2010–2011	Ituano		
2010	→ Joinville (loan)		
2011	Oeste	8	(0)
2012	Bragantino		
2012	Vila Nova	2	(0)
2013	Monte Azul		
2013–2014	Vitória de Guimarães B	7	(1)
2014	Votuporanguense		
2014	Goiânia		
2014	Oeste		
2015	Matonense		
2015	Audax Rio		
2016	Guarani–MG		
2016	Rio Claro		
2017	Toledo		
2017	Olímpia		
2017	Anápolis		
2018–2023	XV de Novembro		
2023	Grêmio Desportivo Prudente		
- * Club domestic league appearances and goals

Jean Pablo Mazaro (born August 26, 1988, in Descalvado), known as Jean Pablo, is a Brazilian footballer who plays for Grêmio Desportivo Prudente as defender.

== Career statistics ==
As of 10 March 2017

Club	Season	League			State League		Cup		Conmebol		Other		Total	
Club	Season	Division	Apps	Goals	Apps	Goals	Apps	Goals	Apps	Goals	Apps	Goals	Apps	Goals
Ituano	2010	Paulista	—		16	0	—		—		—		16	0
Ituano	2011	Paulista	—		2	0	—		—		—		2	0
Ituano	Subtotal		—		18	0	—		—		—		18	0
Oeste	2011	Série D	8	0	—		—		—		—		8	0
Bragantino	2012	Série B	—		4	0	—		—		—		4	0
Vila Nova	2012	Série C	2	0	—		—		—		—		2	0
Monte Azul	2013	Paulista A2	—		16	0	—		—		—		16	0
Vitória de Guimarães B	2013–2014	2ª divisão	7	1	—		—		—		—		7	1
Votuporanguense	2014	Paulista A3	—		7	1	—		—		—		7	1
Matonense	2015	Paulista A2	—		9	1	—		—		—		9	1
Guarani–MG	2016	Mineiro	—		2	0	—		—		—		2	0
Toledo	2017	Paranaense	—		5	0	—		—		—		5	0
Career total			17	1	61	2	0	0	0	0	0	0	78	3
