= Candinho =

Brazilian football manager (born 1945)

Personal information
- Full name: José Cândido Sotto Maior
- Date of birth: 18 January 1945 (age 81)
- Place of birth: São Paulo, Brazil
- Position: Centre back

Senior career*
Years	Team	Apps	(Gls)
1965–1966	Palmeiras	1	(0)
1967–1969	Paulista		
1970	Valencia		
1971	Montreal Olympique	15	(1)

Managerial career
- 1979: Catanduvense
- 1980: XV de Jaú
- 1981: XV de Piracicaba
- 1982: São Bento
- 1983: Juventus-SP
- 1984: América-SP
- 1984–1985: Al-Hilal
- 1986: Grêmio
- 1987: Santos
- 1988: Inter de Limeira
- 1988: Flamengo
- 1988–1990: Fluminense
- 1990–1991: Bahia
- 1992: Bragantino
- 1993–1996: Guarani
- 1997: Vitoria
- 1997: Corinthians
- 1997–1999: Portuguesa
- 1999–2000: Brazil (interim)
- 2000–2001: Corinthians
- 2001–2002: Portuguesa
- 2002–2003: Bahia
- 2003–2003: Goias
- 2004–2005: Al-Ittihad
- 2005–2005: Palmeiras
- 2006–2006: Portuguesa
- 2007: Al-Ittihad
- * Club domestic league appearances and goals

José Cândido Sotto Maior, usually known as Candinho (born January 18, 1945), is a Brazilian football manager.

== Honours ==
Al-Hilal

- Saudi Crown Prince Cup: 1984
- Saudi Professional League: 1984–85

Grêmio

- Campeonato Gaúcho: 1986

Bahia

- Campeonato Baiano: 1991
- Copa do Nordeste: 2002

Al-Ittihad

- AFC Champions League: 2004, 2005
- UAFA Club Championship: 2004–05
- Saudi Professional League: 2006–07

Vitoria

- Campeonato Baiano: 1997
- Copa do Nordeste: 1997

Corinthians

- Campeonato Paulista: 1997, 2001
