= Fábio Santos (footballer, born 1987) =

Brazilian footballer

Personal information
- Full name: José Fábio Santos de Oliveira
- Date of birth: April 21, 1987 (age 39)
- Place of birth: Maceió, Brazil
- Height: 1.84 m (6 ft 0 in)
- Position: Striker

Team information
- Current team: URT

Youth career
- 2002: Real Sport-AL
- 2003–2005: Corinthians-AL

Senior career*
Years	Team	Apps	(Gls)
2005	Mito HollyHock	13	(3)
2006	Shonan Bellmare	15	(3)
2006	Coruripe		
2007	Gama		
2007–2011	Villa Rio	14	(4)
2008	→ Botafogo (loan)	30	(7)
2009	→ Tokushima Vortis (loan)	30	(3)
2010	→ São Caetano (loan)	2	(0)
2011	→ Oeste (loan)		
2011–2012	Avaí	8	(1)
2011	→ Vitória (loan)	17	(7)
2012	→ Red Bull Brasil (loan)		
2013	Daegu FC	2	(0)
2013–2014	Oeste	15	(2)
2015	Ponte Preta	0	(0)
2015	América	0	(0)
2015	Central	0	(0)
2016–	URT	0	(0)
- * Club domestic league appearances and goals as of 2:25, 12 May 2016 (UTC)

José Fábio Santos de Oliveira (born April 21, 1987), commonly known as Fábio or Fábio Santos, is a Brazilian footballer who plays as a striker for URT.

== Career ==
Fábio Santos was born in Maceió. He started his professional career in Japan with J2 League club Mito HollyHock, he made 13 appearances and scored 3 goals during his time in Mito before moving on to join fellow second-tier side Shonan Bellmare. He scored another 3 goals in a total of 15 appearances for Shonan before returning to Brazil in 2006. He firstly joined Coruripe before signing for Gama, his next club was Villa Rio but despite remaining with the club for four seasons he appeared in just 14 matches for them as his spell was littered with loan spells. His first temporary transfer was to Botafogo in 2008, where he scored 7 times in 30 games.

He returned to Villa Rio in 2009 before immediately leaving on loan again, this time he made a return to Japan with Tokushima Vortis. 3 goals in 30 matches followed before departing for his homeland once again to join São Caetano, that was followed by a loan to Oeste in 2011. He returned to Villa Rio soon after before departing permanently as he agreed to sign for Avaí, however, his move to Avaí which lasted from 2011 to 2012 was filled with two loan spells, first to Vitória and then to Red Bull Brasil.

In 2013, Fábio Santos returned to Asia as he completed a transfer to Daegu but made just two appearances before returning to former loan club Oeste on a short-term contract. He made 15 appearances over two seasons for Oeste in Série D before subsequently joining Ponte Preta, América, Central and most recently URT, for whom he made his debut with against Cruzeiro in the 2016 Campeonato Mineiro.

== Career statistics ==
Club performance			League		Cup		Total	
Season	Club	League	Apps	Goals	Apps	Goals	Apps	Goals
Japan			League		Emperor's Cup		Total	
2005	Mito HollyHock	J2 League	13	3	2	3	15	6
2006	Shonan Bellmare	J2 League	15	3	0	0	15	3
2009	Tokushima Vortis	J2 League	30	3	0	0	30	3
Country	Japan		58	9	2	3	60	12
Total			58	9	2	3	60	12

== Honours ==
Coruripe

Campeonato Alagoano: 2006

Botafogo

Taça Rio: 2008

Oeste. craque do interior 2011

Campeonato Paulista do Interior: 2011 e 2015 ponte preta
