= Luiz Carlos Martins =

Brazilian football manager

Personal information
- Date of birth: 22 August 1955 (age 71)
- Place of birth: Cafelândia, Brazil
- Position: Defensive midfielder

Youth career
- 1972: Noroeste

Senior career*
Years	Team	Apps	(Gls)
1972–1974	Noroeste		
1974–1976	Vasco da Gama		
1977–1978	Noroeste		
1979	Novorizontino		
1979	Paulista		
1980–1982	Gama		
1982	Nacional-SP		
1983	Ginásio Pinhalense		
1983	Matsubara		
1984–1987	Guaçuano		

Managerial career
- 1987: Guaçuano
- 1988–1990: Rio Branco de Andradas
- 1991: Mirassol
- 1992: Guaçuano
- 1993: Paraguaçuense
- 1995: Noroeste
- 1995–1996: Matonense
- 1997: União Barbarense
- 1998: Noroeste
- 1999: São Caetano
- 2000–2001: União Barbarense
- 2001: Mirassol
- 2002–2003: Portuguesa
- 2003–2004: Santo André
- 2004: Oeste
- 2004: Mirassol
- 2004–2005: Marília
- 2005–2006: América de Natal
- 2006: Vila Nova
- 2007: Mirassol
- 2007: Remo
- 2008: Mirassol
- 2008: Noroeste
- 2008–2009: Sertãozinho
- 2009: Mirassol
- 2010: Guaratinguetá
- 2010: Pão de Açúcar
- 2011: Oeste
- 2011: São Bernardo
- 2011: Audax
- 2012: Paulista
- 2012: Juventude
- 2012: São Bernardo
- 2012–2013: Oeste
- 2013: Fortaleza
- 2013: Comercial-SP
- 2014: Oeste
- 2014–2018: São Caetano
- 2019: Portuguesa
- 2020–2023: Noroeste
- 2023: Matonense
- 2024: Comercial-SP
- 2024: Grêmio Prudente
- * Club domestic league appearances and goals

Luiz Carlos Martins (born 8 August 1955) is a Brazilian professional football coach and former player who played as a defensive midfielder.

== Career ==
Since 1992 he coached the clubs: Guaçuano, Paraguaçuense, Noroeste, Matonense, União Barbarense, São Caetano, Portuguesa, Santo André, Oeste, Mirassol, Marília, América-RN, Vila Nova, Remo, Sertãozinho, Guaratinguetá, Pão de Açúcar, São Bernardo, Paulista, Juventude and São Caetano

== Honours ==
Rio Branco

- Campeonato Paulista Série A3: 1986

Paraguaçuense

- Campeonato Paulista Série A2: 1993

Matonense

- Campeonato Paulista Série A3: 1996

Oeste

- Campeonato Brasileiro Série C: 2012

São Caetano

- Campeonato Paulista Série A2: 2017

Noroeste

- Campeonato Paulista Série A3: 2022
