= Leonardo Vitorino =

Brazilian footballer

Personal information
- Date of birth: 23 November 1973 (age 52)
- Place of birth: Rio de Janeiro (RJ), Brazil
- Height: 1.82 m (6 ft 0 in)
- Position: Goalkeeper

Senior career*
Years	Team	Apps	(Gls)
1989–1991	Botafogo		
1991	Iris Club Croix		
1992	Madureira		
1993	Americano		
1993	Arraial do Cabo		

Managerial career
- 1994: United States U-17
- 1997: Cianorte
- 1998–2000: Botafogo U-20
- 2001: Trinidad and Tobago (assistant)
- 2002–2005: Santos Angola
- 2005–2006: La Sierra
- 2006: Estrela do Norte
- 2007: America (assistant)
- 2011: Al Gharafa
- 2015–2016: Buriram United B
- 2016: Lanexang United
- 2017: Cambodia
- 2018: Ceará Sporting Club (technical director)
- 2019: Phnom Penh Crown
- 2020: Grêmio Osasco Audax Esporte Clube
- * Club domestic league appearances and goals

Leonardo Vitorino (born 23 November 1973), known is a former Brazilian footballer who played as a goalkeeper, and mostly coached of Laos national football team. Currently he is the head coach of Laos.

== Career ==
The UEFA Pro Coach Leonardo Vitorino became manager of USA National Team U-17 when he is only 20 years old, when the team came to Brazil made a pre-season in the Brazilian Football Academy. After this he moved to Cianorte with the women's team and won the Campeonato Paranaense. In 1998, he arrived in Botafogo where he won the Campeonato Carioca U-20 three times. In short time with success and young, Vitorino moved to Santos Angola where he won all the titles he managed and the team qualified to the Club African Cup.

In 2005 Leonardo arrived in La Sierra and the team was in tenth position and finished in second, qualifying to the National League.

In 2006, in America Football, came to be assistant of Carlos Roberto where after four months he received the invitation to move to Al-Gharafa in Qatar as Technical Director. In five years the team received from the Federation the honour of being the "Best Youth Development Program" in the country. Leonardo Vitorino managed the team between 2011.

From 2012 to 2014 Leonardo worked in El Jaish Sports Club as Technical Director where the club won many titles and arrived in their first AFC Champions League.

In Thailand 2014–2016 Leonardo Vitorino was the manager of Buriram United's B team. The club was champions three times in the league, and won the Kor Royal Cup, Cup of the League, F.A. Cup and 17 titles in youth regional leagues and three international competitions (two times in Malaysia and once in Qatar).

In May 2016 Leonardo received a proposal from Lanexang United in Laos to replace Dave Booth.

The Coach Leonardo Vitorino got Lanexang United to their first ever AFC Cup.

In March 2017 he was nominated as Head Coach of Cambodia national football team.

In November 2017, Leonardo Vitorino left Cambodia National Team and move to be a Technical Director of Ceará Sporting Club in Brazil.

On October 24, 2018, he was appointed as new head coach of Phnom Penh Crown FC in Cambodian League and was fired in May 2019.
