= Grêmio Esportivo Osasco =

Grêmio Osasco
- Full name: Grêmio Esportivo Osasco Ltda.
- Nicknames: Osasco; GEO; Lobos Vermelhos
- Founded: December 17, 2007 (18 years ago)
- Ground: Estádio Pref. José Liberatti
- Capacity: 12,430
- President: Lindenberg Pessoa de Assis
- Head coach: Leonardo Vitorino
- League: Campeonato Paulista Segunda Divisão
- 2020: Paulista A3, 15th (relegated)
- Website: www.gremioosasco.com.br
Home colors	Away colors

Grêmio Esportivo Osasco, commonly referred to as Grêmio Osasco, was a Brazilian professional association football club based in Osasco, São Paulo. The team is last played in the Campeonato Paulista Segunda Divisão, the fourth tier of the São Paulo state football league.

They play in blue and yellow shirts, blue shorts and socks.

== History ==
The club was founded on December 17, 2007, by five Osasco inhabitants and Esporte Clube Osasco supporters, who were unsatisfied that the city did not have an official representative in São Paulo soccer.

== Seasons ==
=== State championships/cups ===
Year	Competition	Position
2008	Segunda Divisão (IV)	Eliminated in Semifinals
2009	Primeira Divisão Série Serie A3 (III)	Runners-up
2009	Copa Paulista	Eliminated in R16
2010	Primeira Divisão Série A2 (II)	20th
2011	Primeira Divisão Série A3 (III)	Eliminated in Semifinals
2011	Copa Paulista	22nd
2012	Primeira Divisão Série A3 (III)	Runners-up
2012	Copa Paulista	Eliminated in Quarterfinals
2013	Primeira Divisão Série A2 (II)	11th
2013	Copa Paulista	Eliminated in Semifinals
2014	Primeira Divisão Série A2 (II)	19th
2014	Copa Paulista	17th
2015	Primeira Divisão Série A3 (III)	8th
2016	Primeira Divisão Série A3 (III)	9th
2017	Primeira Divisão Série A3 (III)	13th
2018	Primeira Divisão Série A3 (III)	13th
2019	Primeira Divisão Série A3 (III)	13th
2019	Copa Paulista	22nd
2020	Primeira Divisão Série A3 (III)	19th

=== Copa São Paulo de Futebol Júnior (U20) ===
Year	Position
2012	34th
2013	Eliminated in Round of 16
2014	Eliminated in Round of 16
2016	57th
2017	43rd

== Stadium ==
Grêmio Esportivo Osasco play their home games at Estádio José Liberatti. The stadium has a maximum capacity of 11,682 people.
