= Associação Portuguesa de Desportos =

Portuguesa
- Full name: Associação Portuguesa de Desportos
- Nicknames: Lusa; Rubro-Verde (The Red & Green)
- Founded: 14 August 1920; 106 years ago
- Ground: Canindé
- Capacity: 22,004
- SAF CEO: Alex Bourgeois
- President: Leandro Teixeira Duarte
- Head coach: Márcio Zanardi
- League: Campeonato Brasileiro Série D Campeonato Paulista
- 2025 2025: Série D, 17th of 64; Paulista, 8th of 16
- Website: www.portuguesa.com.br
Home colors	Away colors	Third colors

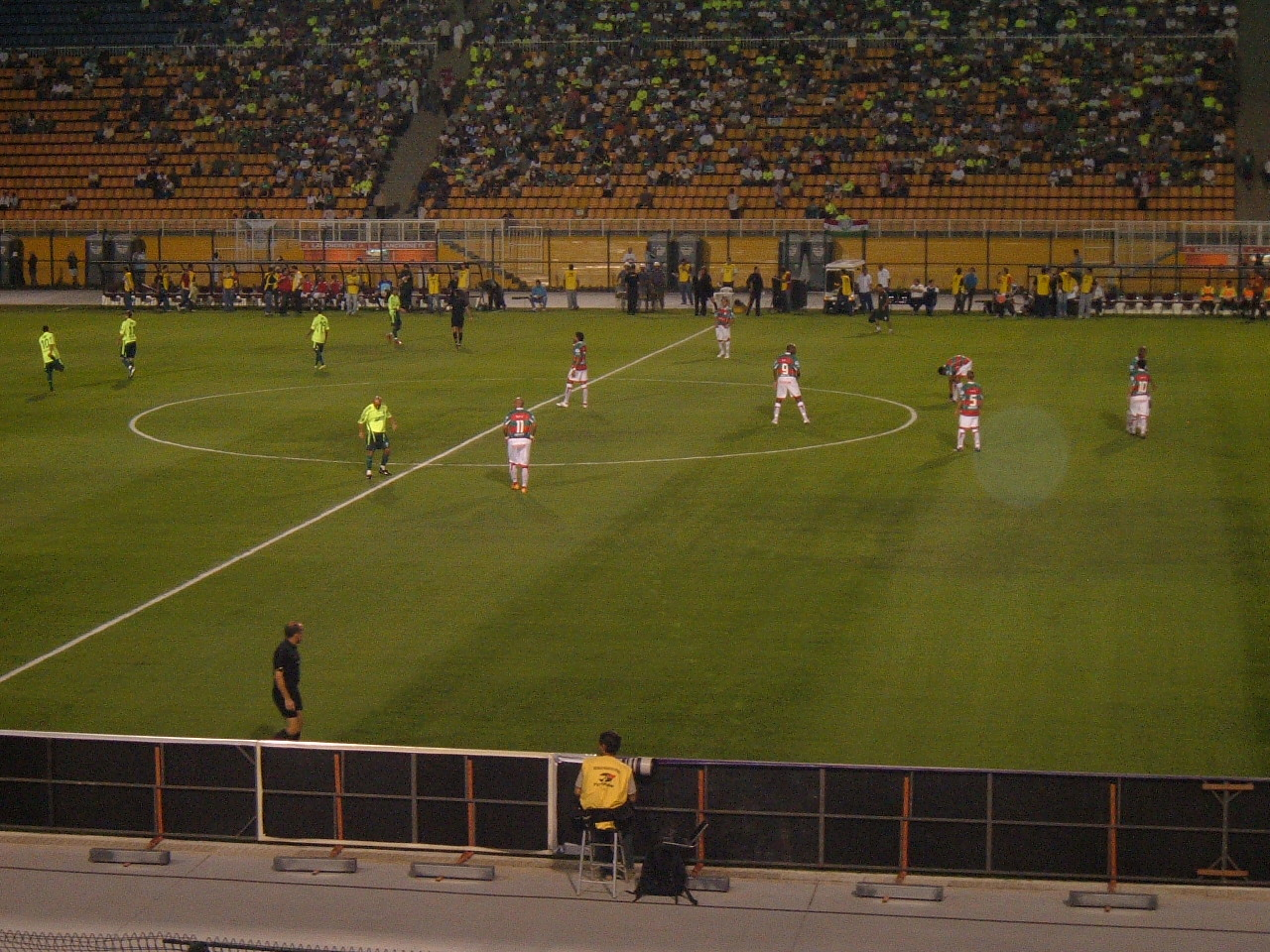
Palmeiras and Portuguesa in action in the Campeonato Brasileiro 2008 at the Estádio do Pacaembu

Associação Portuguesa de Desportos, commonly referred to as Portuguesa or Lusa, is a Brazilian professional football club based in the district of Pari, São Paulo, that competes in the Campeonato Paulista, the top tier of the São Paulo state football league, and the Campeonato Brasileiro Série D. It is part of a sports club, founded on 14 August 1920, by the Portuguese population of the city.

== History ==
=== Foundation ===
On 14 August 1920 (the same day of the 1385 Battle of Aljubarrota), the five Paulista clubs representing the Portuguese community of São Paulo (Lusíadas Futebol Club, Portugal Marinhense, Associação Cinco de Outubro, Associação Atlética Marquês de Pombal and Esporte Club Lusitano) met at Salão da Câmara Portuguesa de Comércio to merge, and founded Associação Portuguesa de Esportes. They chose the colors of Portugal: green and red. The club merged with Mackenzie College in 1920, and was then renamed Mackenzie-Portuguesa.

=== The 1940s and the 1950s ===
In 1940, the club changed its name to Associação Portuguesa de Desportos, its current name. In 1956, Portuguesa bought from São Paulo a big piece of land located in the limits between the northeast and center of the city. In the land, the Canindé stadium was built, as well as the official headquarters, offices and social club.

=== Recent years ===
==== 2011 Série B ====
In the 2011 season Portuguesa participated on the São Paulo State Championship Série A1 (first division) when they were eliminated in the Quarterfinals by São Paulo, in the Campeonato Brasileiro Série B (second division) and in the Copa do Brasil (Brazilian Cup), when they were eliminated in the First Round by Bangu.

After a comeback victory against Americana, on 22 October 2011, the club achieved promotion to Campeonato Brasileiro Série A 2012. On 8 November, after a 2–2 draw against Sport Recife, the club won the 2011 Série B, the first national title won by the club. The title crowned a strong campaign by the Lusa side, with 23 wins, 12 draws and only three defeats. The offensive and fast-paced style of play implemented by the team's coach, Jorginho, and the great number of 82 goals scored led to the nickname of "Barcelusa", referring to FC Barcelona's style of playing. Lusa ended the 2011 Season with a 2–0 win over Icasa, finishing 21 straight games undefeated.

==== 2012: Poor start, relegation and arrival of Dida ====
In 2012, the "Barcelusa" squad struggled in the Campeonato Paulista following the losses of players Marco Antonio and Edno, which led to the relegation to the Campeonato Paulista Série A2 after a 4–2 loss to Mirassol and combined results on other games. The chairman disappointment with the awful campaign in a much considered easy tournament led to the dismissal of the team's coach, Jorginho, after 14 months working for the Lusa side.

The team then turned sights on Geninho, and confirmed the former Brazilian champion as their new head coach. The team mounted a good campaign in the Copa do Brasil, but fell through at the Round of 16 after a 2–0 defeat to Bahia.

Lusa started the Campeonato Brasileiro Série A with their goalkeeper Wéverton negotiating with his departure to play for Atlético Paranaense. Without a good replacement at the youth squad nor the recently added Glédson, Lusa then started negotiating with the two-time UEFA Champions League champion and former Brazil national team goalkeeper Dida, and signed the 38-year-old keeper to wear their colors until the end of the Brasileirão. The keeper started for the first time for Lusa in a match against São Paulo, and had a good showing in a 1–0 win for the Lusa side. Lusa then played against Neymar's Santos, again at home, and with amazing saves by the veteran goalkeeper and losing several clear scoring chances at the first half, the game ended 0–0, with Lusa mounting two wins, three losses and two draws starting the tournament.

Lusa then pulled off a trade with Atlético Paranaense, bringing aboard striker Bruno Mineiro. The negotiation proved to be extremely positive, since the new number 9 started scoring goals at will: in 12 games, he scored 11 times, becoming one of the top scorers in the league, pursuing closely the likes of Vagner Love, Fred and Luís Fabiano.

After twenty-seven games in the Brasileirão, Lusa survived a series of difficult games to maintain its spot out of the relegation zone. Playing against Palmeiras and Coritiba, Lusa won both games by three goals to none at home. Playing Fluminense, São Paulo, Santos and Atlético Mineiro, Lusa lost the first two games, but benefited from the absence of superstar Neymar to beat Santos away by 3–1 and then allowed Atlético Mineiro to escape out of Canindé with a draw. Despite having Brazilian international and former Ballon d'Or winner Ronaldinho, the Atlético side struggled to get out of the strong midfield pressure and ball possession imposed by Lusa, which had played the majority of the second half with a one-man advantage after defender Leonardo Silva was sent off.

Playing against Sport Club do Recife, Bruno Mineiro scored a hat-trick in a turnaround win by 5–1, becoming the new league scoring leader, trespassing Fred. Fred and Mineiro both played for América Mineiro at the youth level.

==== 2013: Promotion back to A1, STJD issues and relegation to Série B ====
In December 2012, Péricles Chamusca was announced as the new head coach, with a one-year contract. He was fired in April 2013. A day after Chamusca's dismissal, the club announced a Colonel, Edson Pimenta, as new coach.

On 16 April 2013, Portuguesa was eliminated by Naviraiense in 2013 Copa do Brasil's first round. Only nine days later, Lusa won promotion to Campeonato Paulista Série A1, after a 2–1 victory against Capivariano.

Although Portuguesa finished the championship just above the relegation positions (precisely in 12th), it was punished by the Superior Court of Sport Justice for irregularly calling in a player during a match against Grêmio – Héverton, who was suspended for a red card received at his previous Copa do Brasil match. With the punishment, the team lost four points – three for the irregular usage of a player and a fourth one which the team won due to the game resulting in a tie – and ended up being relegated in 17th place. This way, Fluminense managed to finish the championship above the relegation positions (15th) and was spared from having to compete in the next year's second division as well as Flamengo, who had also lost four points as punishment for an irregular usage of a player and finished in 16th place.

==== 2014: Late reaction in Paulistão, another relegation ====
On 10 January 2014, a supporter from the club won a lawsuit in São Paulo's courts, which determines the points would be returned to Portuguesa, relegating Flamengo. However, CBF refused to accept the lawsuit, and published the 2014 Série A table without Lusa, placing the club in Série B instead.

In 2014 Campeonato Paulista, Lusa was placed in the Group C, with Santos, Ponte Preta, São Bernardo and Paulista. The club failed to win in their first five games, and saw Guto Ferreira's resignation as head coach. Under Argel Fucks, the club fared better and finished fourth in the group, only four points behind second-placed Ponte.

In April, the club was again knocked out of Copa do Brasil, this time by lowly Potiguar Mossoró; also in the same month, the club left the pitch in the 16th minute of a match against Joinville, and was later punished by STJD due to disbandment.

Argel left Lusa in the following month, and after short-reign terms of Marcelo Veiga and Silas, the club announced the arrival of Vágner Benazzi in mid-September, highly known for his abilities to guide a team out of the relegation places. However, he was also dismissed in the following month, after failing to achieve a single win. During that time, the club also saw a host of players coming and going out, with the squad surpassing the 40 players mark.

Portuguesa was relegated to Série C (for the first time in the club's history) on 28 October, after losing 0–3 to Oeste.

==== 2015–2016: Série C and Série A2 ====
Portuguesa started the 2015 Paulistão with a win, defeating Ponte Preta by 3–2. On 4 March 2015 the club reached the second stage of Copa do Brasil, after a 3–1 away win against Santos-AP.

On 20 March, after being highly pressured, president Ilídio Lico resigned and was replaced by Jorge Manuel Marques Gonçalves. Two weeks later, the club was again relegated to Série A2, after a 0–3 away loss against São Paulo.

During the year's Série C, Portuguesa qualified to the final rounds as second in its group, but missed out promotion after losing to eventual champions Vila Nova. The following year, the club narrowly avoided relegation in Série A2 after finishing 13th.

Portuguesa suffered another relegation in the end of the 2016 season, after a 0–2 away loss against Tombense, being demoted to Série D ahead of the 2017 campaign.

==== 2017–2024: Série D, non-division and Copa Paulista title ====
Ahead of the 2017 season, Portuguesa announced Émerson Leão as their football consultant, with Tuca Guimarães being appointed as head coach. With subsequent head coaches Estevam Soares and Mauro Fernandes, the club was knocked out in the first phase of the year's Série D, and also reached the semifinals of the Copa Paulista, meaning that the club was not included in any national division for the 2018 season.

During the 2018 campaign, Lusa had Guilherme Alves and Allan Aal as their head coaches, finishing in both disappointing mid-table positions in the Série A2 and in the Copa Paulista. In the 2019 season, the first team was managed by Luís Carlos Martins, Vica and former youth graduate Zé Maria, again with little success.

Moacir Júnior started the 2020 campaign as head coach, but was sacked in February. Another youth graduate, Fernando Marchiori, was named in his place, and led the club to the quarterfinals of the Série A2. In the Copa Paulista, the club lifted the trophy for the first time in their history, only losing one match in the entire competition and having the second-best defensive records of the tournament's history; the title also ensured Portuguesa back in a national tournament after three years of absence.

In the 2021 Campeonato Brasileiro Série D, Portuguesa led their group but was knocked out of the tournament on penalties by Caxias. This led to the departure of Marchiori as head coach, and another former player of the club, Alex Alves, took over.

On 9 April 2022, under the guidance of Sérgio Soares, Lusa achieved promotion to the Campeonato Paulista after seven years. The club started the 2023 season with Mazola Júnior as head coach, and narrowly avoided relegation in the 2023 Campeonato Paulista under Gilson Kleina, who opted to leave the club at the end of the competition; in that year, they also introduced a new Rooster of Barcelos-themed third kit, which was inspired on a popular Portuguese folk tale and symbol.

Portuguesa started the 2024 campaign with Dado Cavalcanti as head coach, but he was replaced by Pintado after five matches. The club reached the quarterfinals of the Paulistão after 13 years, but were knocked out by Santos. In the 2024 Copa Paulista, they reached the semifinals.

==== 2025–: SAF project ====
On 7 November 2024, an offer from a group of investors (Tauá Partners, Revee and XP Investimentos) was presented to Portuguesa's Council to purchase 80% of the club's Sociedade Anônima do Futebol project, which included an investment of R$ 1 billion to clear the club's debt and build a new arena in the place of the current Estádio do Canindé. The offer was approved by acclamation seven days later.

In their first year as a SAF, Lusa avoided relegation in the 2025 Campeonato Paulista and had a disappointing finish in the 2025 Série D, being knocked out in the round of 32 by Mixto. As the club opted not to play in the Copa Paulista, their calendar year ended in early August. A better performance occurred in the 2026 Paulistão as the club finished fourth in the first stage but lost to Corinthians on penalties in te quarterfinals, but another disappointment came in the league, as they were knocked out in the round of 16 by Uberlândia.

== Honours ==
=== Official tournaments ===
National
Competitions	Titles	Seasons
Campeonato Brasileiro Série B	1	2011
Inter-state
Competitions	Titles	Seasons
Torneio Rio–São Paulo	2	1952, 1955
State
Competitions	Titles	Seasons
Campeonato Paulista	3	1935, 1936, 1973
Copa Paulista	1	2020
Campeonato Paulista Série A2	3	2007, 2013, 2022

=== Others tournaments ===
==== International ====
- San Izidro Cup (1): 1951
- Bogota Quadrangular Tournament (1): 1953
- Istanbul Quadrangular Tournament (1): 1972
- Torneio Internacional do Estádio do Canindé (1): 1981
- Torneio Madeira Autonomia (1): 1988

==== National ====
- Torneio Quadrangular de Salvador (1): 1951
- Torneio Quadrangular de Belo Horizonte (1): 1951
- Torneio Folha de Londrina (1): 1956
- Torneio Norte do Paraná (1): 1957
- Torneio Oswaldo Teixeira Duarte (1): 1971
- Torneio Vicente Matheus (1): 1990

==== State ====
- Taça Cidade de São Paulo (1): 1973
- Taça Governador do Estado de São Paulo (1): 1976
- Taça Piratininga (1): 1964
- Torneio Início (3): 1935, 1947, 1996

=== Runners-up ===
- Campeonato Brasileiro Série A (1): 1996
- Campeonato Paulista (4): 1940, 1960, 1975, 1985

=== Youth team ===
- Copa São Paulo de Futebol Júnior (2): 1991, 2002

=== Awards ===
- Fita Azul (3): 1951, 1953, 1954

Fita Azul do Futebol Brasileiro (Brazilian Football Blue Ribbon) was an award given for the club which succeeds in an excursion out of the country.

=== Women's Football ===
- Campeonato Brasileiro de Futebol Feminino (1): 1999-2000
- Campeonato Paulista de Futebol Feminino (2): 1998, 2000

== Rivals ==
During its time in the Serie A and state championships, Portuguesa has had run-ins with Corinthians, Palmeiras, São Paulo and Juventus.

== Stadium ==
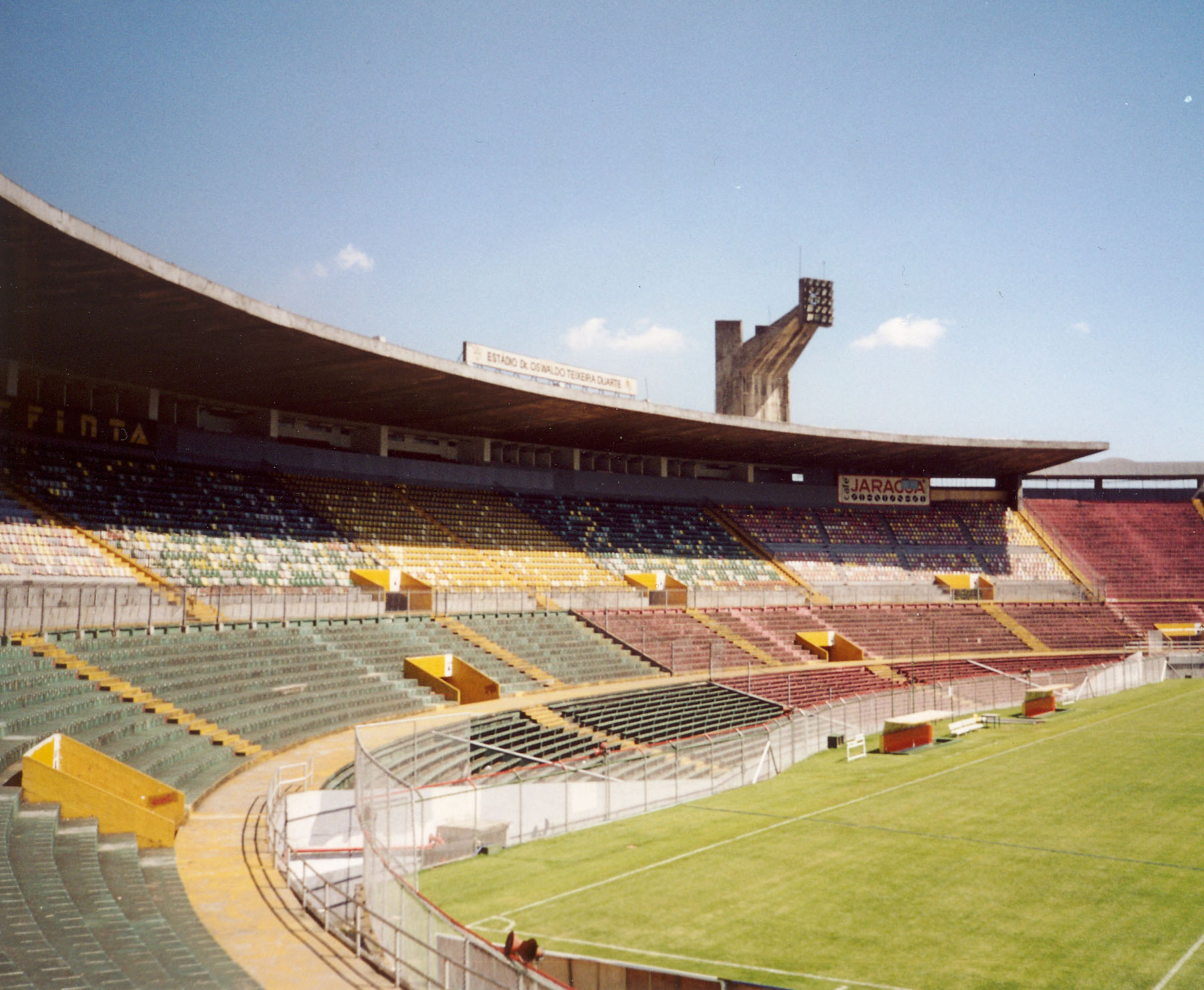
A view of Estádio do Canindé, the home of Portuguesa

Portuguesa's stadium is the Estádio do Canindé, built in 1956, with a maximum capacity of 27,500. Following current FIFA safety rules, the maximum capacity is 25,470 people.

== Logo history ==
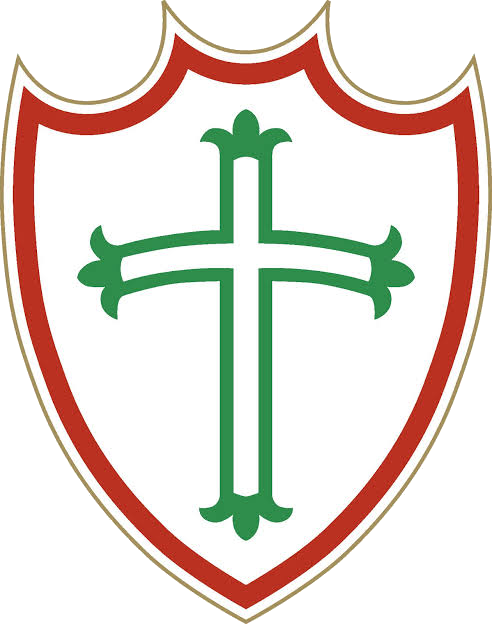
2005–2015 logo

The club's first logo was introduced on 14 August 1920, during the club's foundation, was a Portuguese shield. This logo was chosen to honor Portugal.

The club's second logo, introduced in 1923, had a Cross of Avis bordered by a red outline. The Cross of Avis represents Portuguese independence from the Kingdom of Castille, which happened after the Battle of Aljubarrota on 14 August 1385.

In 2005, the club's logo design was modernized, and golden trim was added around the red outline.

In 2015, Portuguesa returned to the badge used between 1923 and 2005.

== Team colors ==
Portuguesa's first kit, introduced on 20 September 1920, was an all-red shirt, white shorts, and red socks with two horizontal green lines. The goalkeeper kit was completely white.

On 26 March 1923, the club's kit was changed to red and green vertically striped shirts.

The team kit was later changed again, with the red and green stripes changed to horizontal ones, and the away kit became an all-white shirt, red shorts and red socks.

== Mascots ==
Portuguesa's first mascot was a Portuguese girl named Severa. She was named after the 1930s fado singer Dima Tereza who was nicknamed A Severa, after the Portuguese fado singer Maria Severa Onofriana.

In 1994, Portuguesa changed its mascot. The club's unique original mascot was replaced by a lion wearing the club's home kit. The lion is one of the most common Brazilian football club's mascots.

== Anthems ==
There are two club's anthems. The first anthem, called Hino Rubro-verde (Portuguese for Red and Green Anthem) is the old one, and was composed by Archimedes Messina and Carlos Leite Guerra.

The second anthem, called Campeões (Portuguese for Champions) is the current club's anthem, and was composed by Roberto Leal and Márcia Lúcia.

== Current squad ==
=== First-team squad ===
As of 22 November 2026

Note: Flags indicate national team as defined under FIFA eligibility rules; some limited exceptions apply. Players may hold more than one non-FIFA nationality.

No.	Pos.	Nation	Player
1	GK	BRA	Ricardo Friedrich
2	DF	BRA	João Vitor
3	DF	BRA	Gustavo Henrique
6	DF	BRA	Gustavo Salomão
7	FW	BRA	Pedro Felipe (on loan from Noroeste)
8	MF	BRA	Cesinha
14	MF	BRA	Marcelo Freitas

No.	Pos.	Nation	Player
15	DF	BRA	Wellington
17	DF	BRA	Caio Roque
20	MF	BRA	Guilherme Portuga
21	FW	BRA	Romarinho
33	DF	BRA	Eric Botteghin
39	DF	BRA	Carlos Lima (on loan from Tochigi City)
42	DF	BRA	Gustavo Sciencia

=== Youth team ===
Note: Flags indicate national team as defined under FIFA eligibility rules; some limited exceptions apply. Players may hold more than one non-FIFA nationality.

No.	Pos.	Nation	Player
31	DF	BRA	Gabriel
40	FW	BRA	Fellype Gabryel
71	MF	BRA	Luca
—	GK	BRA	Kauã Araújo
—	DF	ESP	Ernest Muñoz
—	DF	BRA	Mateus Luiz

No.	Pos.	Nation	Player
—	DF	BRA	Pedrinho
—	MF	BRA	Breno
—	MF	BRA	Ruan
—	FW	BRA	Guilherme Henrique
—	FW	BRA	Kauã Rodrigo

=== Other players under contract ===
Note: Flags indicate national team as defined under FIFA eligibility rules; some limited exceptions apply. Players may hold more than one non-FIFA nationality.

No.	Pos.	Nation	Player
4	DF	BRA	Eduardo Biazus (captain)
8	MF	BRA	Felipe Tontini
10	FW	BRA	Jonas Toró

No.	Pos.	Nation	Player
13	FW	BRA	Igor Torres
99	FW	BRA	João Diogo
—	FW	BRA	Thiago Rubim (on loan from Atlético Tubarão)

=== Out on loan ===
Note: Flags indicate national team as defined under FIFA eligibility rules; some limited exceptions apply. Players may hold more than one non-FIFA nationality.

No.	Pos.	Nation	Player
—	FW	BRA	Matheus Cadorini (at Santa Cruz until 1 December 2026)
—	FW	BRA	Cauari (at Hercílio Luz until 30 March 2027)
—	FW	BRA	Everton Maceió (at Kyoto Sanga until 30 June 2027)

== Personnel ==
=== Current technical staff ===
Position	Staff
Head coach	(Brazil) Márcio Zanardi
Assistant coach	(Brazil) Caco Espinoza (Brazil) Raphael Laruccia
Fitness coach	Vacant
Goalkeeper coach	(Brazil) Rogério Lima
Technical coordinator	(Brazil) Marco Antônio

Last updated: 15 October 2026

== Managers ==
- (Brazil) Otto Glória (1973–75)
- (Brazil) Candinho (1997–99)
- (Brazil) Mário Zagallo (1999–2000)
- (Brazil) Candinho (2001–02)
- (Brazil) Heriberto da Cunha (2003)
- (Brazil) Paulo Comelli (2004)
- (Brazil) Alexandre Gallo (2005)
- (Brazil) Giba (2005–06)
- (Brazil) Candinho (2006)
- (Brazil) Vágner Benazzi (2006–08)
- (Brazil) Estevam Soares (2008–09)
- (Brazil) Mário Sérgio (2009)
- (Brazil) Paulo Bonamigo (2009)
- (Brazil) Renê Simões (2009)
- (Brazil) Vágner Benazzi (2009–10)
- (Brazil) Vadão (2010)
- (Brazil) Sérgio Guedes (2010–11)
- (Brazil) Jorginho (2011–12)
- (Brazil) Geninho (2012)
- (Brazil) Péricles Chamusca (2012–13)
- (Brazil) Guto Ferreira (2013–14)
- (Brazil) Argel Fucks (2014)
- (Brazil) Marcelo Veiga (2014)
- (Brazil) Paulo Silas (2014)
- (Brazil) Vágner Benazzi (2014)
- (Brazil) Ailton Silva (2014–15)
- (Brazil) Júnior Lopes (2015)
- (Brazil) Estevam Soares (2015)
- (Brazil) Anderson Beraldo (2016)
- (Brazil) Jorginho (2016)
- (Brazil) Márcio Ribeiro (2016)
- (Brazil) Tuca Guimarães (2017)
- (Brazil) Estevam Soares (2017)
- (Brazil) Mauro Fernandes (2017)
- (Brazil) PC Gusmão (2017)
- (Brazil) Guilherme Alves (2018)
- (Brazil) Allan Aal (2018)
- (Brazil) Luís Carlos Martins (2019)
- (Brazil) Vica (2019)
- (Brazil) Zé Maria (2019)
- (Brazil) Moacir Júnior (2020)
- (Brazil) Fernando Marchiori (2020–21)
- (Brazil) Alex Alves (2021)
- (Brazil) Sérgio Soares (2022)
- (Brazil) Mazola Júnior (2023)
- (Brazil) Gilson Kleina (2023)
- (Brazil) Leandro Zago (2023)
- (Brazil) Dado Cavalcanti (2024)
- (Brazil) Pintado (2024)
- (Brazil) Alan Dotti (2024)
- (Brazil) Cauan de Almeida (2025)
- (Brazil) Fábio Matias (2026)
- (Brazil) Ademir Fesan (2026–)

== See also ==
- List of Associação Portuguesa de Desportos statistics
