= Batatais Futebol Clube =

Football club in Batatais, Brazil

Batatais
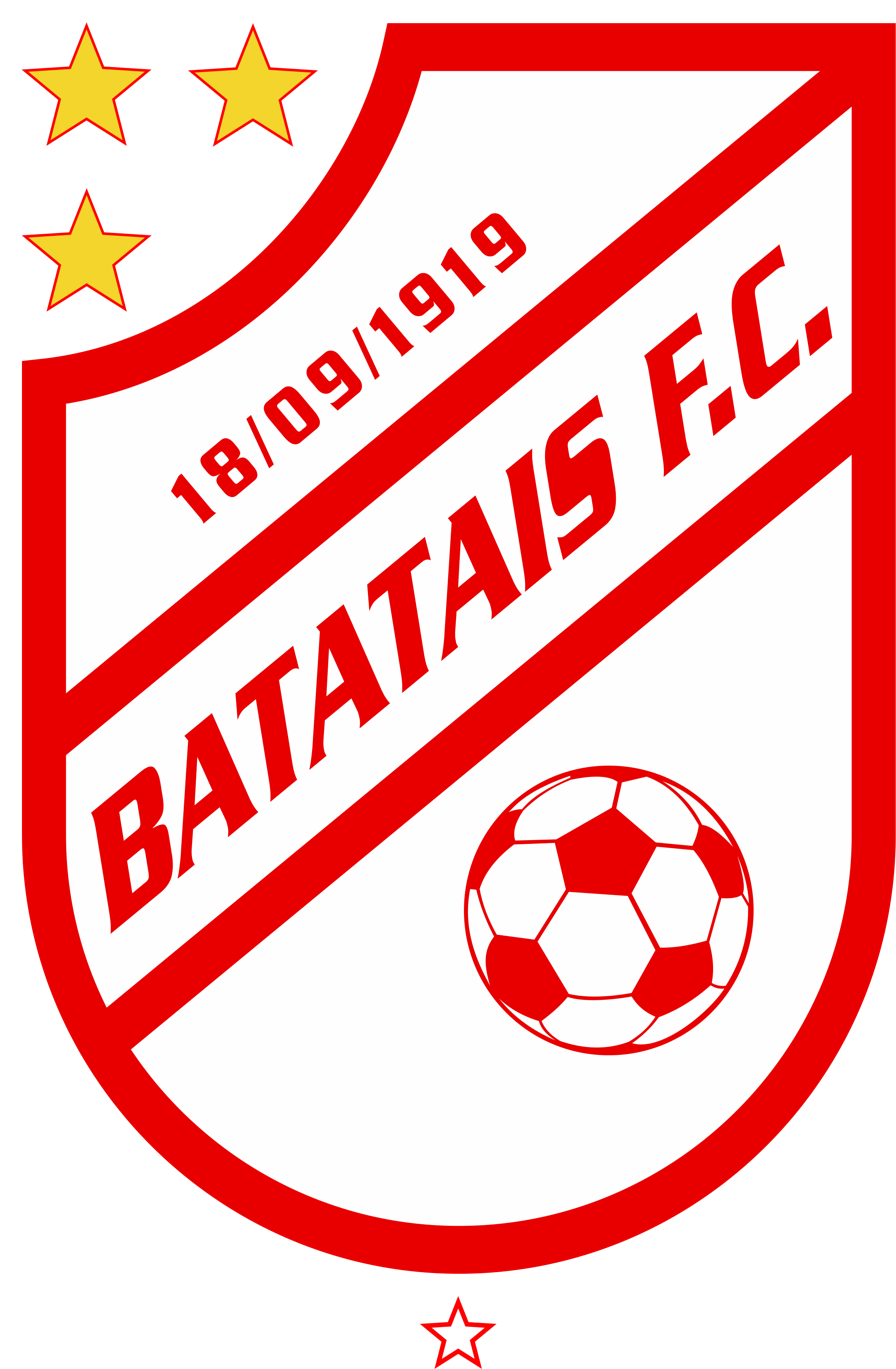
- Full name: Batatais Futebol Clube
- Nickname: Fantasma da Mogiana (Ghost of mogiana)
- Founded: 18 September 1919; 106 years ago
- Ground: Estádio Dr. Osvaldo Scatena
- Capacity: 13,000
- League: Campeonato Paulista Segunda Divisão
- 2025: Paulista Segunda Divisão, 5th of 15
| Home colors | Away colors |

Batatais Futebol Clube, commonly referred to as Batatais, is a Brazilian professional association football club based in Batatais, São Paulo. The team competes in Campeonato Paulista Segunda Divisão, the fourth tier of the São Paulo state football league.

== History ==
The club was founded on 18 September 1919, as Batatais Foot-Ball Club by former members of the local club Riachuelo Futebol Clube.

== Stadium ==
Batatais Futebol Clube play its home games at Estádio Doutor Oswaldo Scatena, which has a maximum capacity of 8,540 people.

== Honours ==
- Campeonato Paulista Série A2
  - Winners (1): 1945
