= Atlético Monte Azul =

Association football club in Brazil

Monte Azul
- Full name: Atlético Monte Azul
- Nickname: Azulão
- Founded: April 28, 1920; 105 years ago
- Ground: Otacília Patrício Arroyo
- Capacity: 13,100
- President: Marcelo Cardoso
- Head coach: Edson Só
- League: Campeonato Paulista Série A2
- 2025 2025: Série D, 49th of 64; Paulista Série A3, 2nd of 16 (promoted)
Home colours	Away colours

Atlético Monte Azul, commonly referred to as Monte Azul, is a professional association football club based in Monte Azul Paulista, São Paulo, Brazil. The team competes in Campeonato Paulista Série A3, the third tier of the São Paulo state football league, and in Campeonato Brasileiro Série D. The stadium, Estádio Otacília Patrício Arroyo, is located at 33, Rua Monteiro Lobato.

== History ==
Atlético Monte Azul were founded on April 28, 1920, by several people, including José Cione, who suggested the name Monte Azul. In the late 1940s, the club professionalized their football department, and joined the Campeonato Paulista in 1950. The club won the Campeonato Paulista Segunda Divisão in 2004. Monte Azul won the Campeonato Paulista Série A2 in 2009, after beating Rio Branco in the final. thus being promoted to compete in the 2010 Campeonato Paulista.

== Stadium ==
Monte Azul play their home games at Estádio do Atlético Monte Azul, commonly known as AMA. The stadium has a maximum capacity of 11,109 people.

== Current squad (selected) ==
Note: Flags indicate national team as defined under FIFA eligibility rules; some limited exceptions apply. Players may hold more than one non-FIFA nationality.

No.	Pos.	Nation	Player
—	GK	BRA	Igor
—	GK	BRA	André Luis
—	DF	BRA	André Cunha ()
—	DF	BRA	Flavio
—	DF	BRA	Fábio Silva
—	DF	BRA	Pitty
—	DF	BRA	Robson
—	DF	BRA	Cris
—	DF	BRA	Carlos Xavier

No.	Pos.	Nation	Player
—	DF	BRA	Jean Pablo
—	DF	BRA	Marcelo Godri
—	DF	BRA	Marcelo Ferreira
—	MF	BRA	Marcelinho
—	MF	BRA	Nerylon
—	FW	BRA	Johnny
—	FW	BRA	Alexsandro

=== Out on loan ===
Note: Flags indicate national team as defined under FIFA eligibility rules; some limited exceptions apply. Players may hold more than one non-FIFA nationality.

No.	Pos.	Nation	Player
—	MF	BRA	Gabriel (on loan to Palmeiras until 31 December 2016)

== Honours ==
- Copa Paulista
  - Winners (1): 2024
- Campeonato Paulista Série A2
  - Winners (1): 2009
- Campeonato Paulista Série A4
  - Winners (2): 1994, 2004
