= 2017 Santa Cruz Futebol Clube season =

Santa Cruz
2017 season
- Chairman: Alírio Moraes
- Manager: Vinícius Eutrópio; Adriano Teixeira (c); Givanildo Oliveira; Marcelo Martelotte
- Stadium: Estádio do Arruda
- Série B: 18th
- Pernambucano: 3rd
- Copa do Brasil: Round of 16
- Copa do Nordeste: Semi-finals
- Top goalscorer: League: João Paulo and Ricardo Bueno (6); All: Anderson Salles (11)
Home colours	Away colours

The 2017 season was Santa Cruz's 104th season in the club's history. Santa Cruz competed in the Campeonato Pernambucano, Copa do Brasil, Copa do Nordeste and Série B.

== Squad ==
Note: Flags indicate national team as defined under FIFA eligibility rules; some limited exceptions apply. Players may hold more than one non-FIFA nationality.

No.	Pos.	Nation	Player
1	GK	BRA	Júlio César
2	DF	BRA	Vítor
3	DF	BRA	Bruno Silva
4	DF	BRA	Anderson Salles
5	DF	BRA	Jaime
6	DF	BRA	Eduardo Brito
7	MF	BRA	João Ananias
8	MF	BRA	Derley
9	FW	BRA	Halef Pitbull
11	FW	BRA	William Barbio
12	GK	BRA	Jacsson
14	MF	BRA	Wellington Cézar
17	DF	BRA	Yuri
18	MF	BRA	Léo Lima
20	MF	BRA	Willams Luz
25	MF	BRA	Marcílio

No.	Pos.	Nation	Player
28	MF	BRA	João Paulo
33	FW	BRA	Júlio César
36	FW	BRA	Bruno Paulo
72	GK	BRA	Lucas Silva
75	DF	BRA	Nininho
77	MF	BRA	Kelvy
83	DF	BRA	Sandro
88	DF	BRA	Tiago Costa
91	FW	BRA	Augusto
93	MF	BRA	Thiago Primão
97	FW	BRA	André Luis
98	DF	BRA	Alex Travassos
99	FW	BRA	Ricardo Bueno
—	MF	BRA	Lucas Gomes
—	FW	BRA	Léo Cotia
—	FW	BRA	Pachu
—	FW	BRA	Grafite

== Statistics ==
=== Overall ===
Games played	64 (10 Copa do Nordeste, 14 Pernambucano, 2 Copa do Brasil, 38 Série B)
Games won	21 (7 Copa do Nordeste, 6 Pernambucano, 0 Copa do Brasil, 8 Série B)
Games drawn	20 (1 Copa do Nordeste, 5 Pernambucano, 1 Copa do Brasil, 13 Série B)
Games lost	23 (2 Copa do Nordeste, 3 Pernambucano, 1 Copa do Brasil, 17 Série B)
Goals scored	79
Goals conceded	75
Goal difference	+4
Best results (goal difference)	5–1 (H) v Central – Pernambucano – 2017.03.18
Worst result (goal difference)	0–4 (A) v Paraná – Série B – 2017.07.29
Top scorer	Anderson Salles (11)

Source: Santa Cruz official website

=== Goalscorers ===
Place	Position	Nationality	Number	Name	Copa do Nordeste	Campeonato Pernambucano	Copa do Brasil	Série B	Total
1	DF	(Brazil)	4	Anderson Salles	3	4	0	4	11
2	FW	(Brazil)	9	Halef Pitbull	4	3	0	2	9
3	MF	(Brazil)	21	Éverton Santos	1	6	0	0	7
4	MF	(Brazil)	28	João Paulo	0	0	0	6	6
4	FW	(Brazil)	99	Ricardo Bueno	0	0	0	6	6
5	FW	(Brazil)	97	André Luis	0	2	0	3	5
6	FW	(Brazil)	11	William Barbio	0	1	0	3	4
7	FW	(Brazil)	91	Augusto	0	0	0	3	3
7	FW	(Brazil)	36	Bruno Paulo	0	0	0	3	3
7	FW	(Brazil)	23	Grafite	0	0	0	3	3
7	MF	(Brazil)	33	Júlio César	1	1	0	1	3
7	MF	(Brazil)	10	Léo Costa	2	1	0	0	3
7	MF	(Brazil)	17	Thomás Bedinelli	2	1	0	0	3
8	MF	(Brazil)	25	Marcílio	0	0	0	2	2
8	DF	(Brazil)	6	Roberto	0	1	0	1	2
9	DF	(Brazil)	3	Bruno Silva	0	0	0	1	1
9	MF	(Brazil)	8	Derley	0	0	0	1	1
9	MF	(Uruguay)	20	Federico Gino	0	1	0	0	1
9	MF	(Brazil)	7	João Ananias	0	0	0	1	1
9	MF	(Brazil)	18	Léo Lima	0	0	0	1	1
9	MF	(Brazil)	21	Pereira	0	1	0	0	1
9	DF	(Brazil)	2	Vítor	0	0	0	1	1
9	MF	(Brazil)	14	Wellington	0	0	0	1	1
				Own goals	0	1	0	0	1
				Total	13	23	0	43	79

=== Managers performance ===
Name	Nationality	From	To	P	W	D	L	GF	GA	Avg%	Ref
Vinícius Eutrópio	Brazil	25 January 2017	9 June 2017	31	16	7	8	43	28	59%	
Adriano Teixeira (c)	Brazil	2 March 2017	21 November 2017	9	2	3	4	13	14	33%	
Givanildo Oliveira	Brazil	7 July 2017	26 August 2017	11	2	3	6	11	17	27%	
Marcelo Martelotte	Brazil	9 September 2017	14 November 2017	13	1	7	5	12	16	25%	

(c) Indicates the caretaker manager

== Friendlies ==
=== Training match ===
14 January 2017	Santa Cruz	3–0	Timbaúba	Olinda
(UTC-3)	Éverton Santos 67'; Williams Luz 90+2'; Anderson Salles 90+16'	Report		Stadium: Estádio Grito da República (do Rio Doce)

=== Taça Asa Branca ===
21 January 2017	Santa Cruz	1–0	Paysandu	Recife
17:00 (UTC-3)	Léo Costa 35'	Report		Stadium: Estádio José do Rego Maciel (Arruda); Attendance: 14,002; Referee: Marcelo de Lima Henrique

== Official Competitions ==
=== Copa do Nordeste ===
==== Group stage ====
25 January 2017 1	Campinense	1–1	Santa Cruz	Campina Grande
19:45 (UTC-3)	Augusto 84'	Report	Léo Costa 88'	Stadium: Estádio Governador Ernani Sátyro (Amigão); Attendance: 7,061; Referee: Mayron Frederico dos Reis Novais

4 February 2017 2	Santa Cruz	1–0	Náutico	Recife
17:00 (UTC-3)	Éverton Santos 52'	Report		Stadium: Estádio José do Rego Maciel (Arruda); Attendance: 5,086; Referee: Denis da Silva Ribeiro Serafim

12 February 2017 3	Santa Cruz	4–0	Uniclinic	Recife
17:00 (UTC-3)	Halef Pitbull 33', 73', 83'; Thomás Bedinelli 61'	Report		Stadium: Estádio José do Rego Maciel (Arruda); Attendance: 5,212; Referee: José Ricardo Vasconcellos Laranjeira

25 February 2017 4	Uniclinic	0–2	Santa Cruz	Horizonte
16:30 (UTC-3)		Report	Thomás Bedinelli 38'; Júlio César 72'	Stadium: Estádio Olímpico Horácio Domingos de Sousa (Domingão); Attendance: 193; Referee: Mayron Frederico dos Reis Novais

12 March 2017 5	Náutico	1–0	Santa Cruz	São Lourenço da Mata
16:00 (UTC-3)	Nirley 17'	Report		Stadium: Estádio Governador Carlos Wilson Campos (Arena Pernambuco); Attendance: 3,851; Referee: Caio Max Augusto Vieira

22 March 2017 6	Santa Cruz	1–0	Campinense	Recife
21:45 (UTC-3)	Anderson Salles 30'	Report		Stadium: Estádio José do Rego Maciel (Arruda); Attendance: 8,003; Referee: Claudio Francisco Lima e Silva

==== Quarter-finals ====
29 March 2017	Itabaiana	0–1	Santa Cruz	Itabaiana
21:45 (UTC-3)		Report	Anderson Salles 20'	Stadium: Estádio Etelvino Mendonça; Attendance: 3,648; Referee: Marielson Alves Silva

1 April 2017	Santa Cruz	1–0	Itabaiana	Recife
18:15 (UTC-3)	Anderson Salles 72'	Report		Stadium: Estádio José do Rego Maciel (Arruda); Attendance: 21,101; Referee: Jailson Macêdo Freitas

==== Semi-finals ====
29 April 2017	Sport	1–2	Santa Cruz	Recife
18:30 (UTC-3)	Diego Souza 39'	Report	Léo Costa 32'; Halef Pitbull 75'	Stadium: Estádio Adelmar da Costa Carvalho (Ilha do Retiro); Attendance: 23,574; Referee: Cláudio Francisco Lima e Silva

3 May 2017	Santa Cruz	0–2	Sport	Recife
21:45 (UTC-3)		Report	Everton Felipe 17'; André 78'	Stadium: Estádio José do Rego Maciel (Arruda); Attendance: 35,231; Referee: Péricles Bassols Pegado Cortez

==== Record ====
Final Position	Points	Matches	Wins	Draws	Losses	Goals For	Goals Away	Avg%
3rd	22	10	7	1	2	13	5	73%

=== Campeonato Pernambucano ===
==== First stage ====
29 January 2017 1	Náutico	1–1	Santa Cruz	São Lourenço da Mata
17:00 (UTC-3)	Anselmo 90'	Report	Léo Costa 90+3'	Stadium: Estádio Governador Carlos Wilson Campos (Arena Pernambuco); Attendance: 4,620; Referee: Péricles Bassols

1 February 2017 2	Santa Cruz	0–0	Belo Jardim	Recife
22:30 (UTC-3)		Report		Stadium: Estádio José do Rego Maciel (Arruda); Attendance: 2,154; Referee: Luiz Cláudio Sobral

9 February 2017 3	Central	2–4	Santa Cruz	São Lourenço da Mata
21:30 (UTC-3)	Anderson Lessa 43'; Altemar 67' (pen.)	Report	Éverton Santos 16', 90'; Anderson Salles 85'; William Barbio 90+2'	Stadium: Estádio Governador Carlos Wilson Campos (Arena Pernambuco)

18 February 2017 4	Santa Cruz	1–1	Sport	Recife
17:30 (UTC-3)	Halef Pitbull 61'	Report	Diego Souza 41'	Stadium: Estádio José do Rego Maciel (Arruda); Attendance: 12,408; Referee: Sebastião Rufino Filho

2 March 2017 5	Santa Cruz	1–2	Salgueiro	Recife
20:30 (UTC-3)	Ranieri 85' (o.g.)	Report	William Lira 37'; Toty 45'	Stadium: Estádio José do Rego Maciel (Arruda); Attendance: 5,015; Referee: Giorgio Wilton Macêdo dos Santos

5 March 2017 6	Salgueiro	0–1	Santa Cruz	Salgueiro
16:00 (UTC-3)		Report	Halef Pitbull 9'	Stadium: Estádio Cornélio de Barros; Referee: Péricles Bassols Pegado Cortez

18 March 2017 7	Santa Cruz	5–1	Central	Recife
16:00 (UTC-3)	Éverton Santos 2', 17'; Halef Pitbull 36'; Anderson Salles 64'; Gino 90'	Report	Thomás Kayck 56'	Stadium: Estádio José do Rego Maciel (Arruda)

26 March 2017 8	Sport	1–1	Santa Cruz	Recife
16:00 (UTC-3)	Rogério 68'	Report	Pereira 83'	Stadium: Estádio Adelmar da Costa Carvalho (Ilha do Retiro); Attendance: 10,221; Referee: Deborah Cecília

5 April 2017 9	Belo Jardim	0–4	Santa Cruz	São Lourenço da Mata
21:45 (UTC-3)		Report	Anderson Salles 38' (pen.); Thomás Bedinelli 76' (pen.); Júlio César 78'; André Luis 83'	Stadium: Estádio Governador Carlos Wilson Campos (Arena Pernambuco); Attendance: 1,370; Referee: Emerson Sobral

10 April 2017 10	Santa Cruz	1–2	Náutico	Recife
20:30 (UTC-3)	Éverton Santos 52'	Report	Erick 19'; Dudu Figueiredo 76'	Stadium: Estádio José do Rego Maciel (Arruda); Attendance: 23,710; Referee: Péricles Bassols

==== Semi-finals ====
15 April 2017	Santa Cruz	1–0	Salgueiro	Recife
18:30 (UTC-3)	Anderson Salles 58' (pen.)	Report		Stadium: Estádio José do Rego Maciel (Arruda); Attendance: 22,056; Referee: Deborah Cecília Cruz Correia

22 April 2017	Salgueiro	2–0	Santa Cruz	Salgueiro
19:00 (UTC-3)	Rodolfo Potiguar 66'; Jean Carlos 70'	Report		Stadium: Estádio Cornélio de Barros; Attendance: 5,184; Referee: José Woshington da Silva

==== Matches for Third Place ====
6 May 2017	Náutico	1–2	Santa Cruz	São Lourenço da Mata
16:00 (UTC-3)	Alison 78'	Report	André Luis 45'; Roberto 61'	Stadium: Estádio Governador Carlos Wilson Campos (Arena Pernambuco); Attendance: 3,267; Referee: Deborah Cecília Cruz Correia

16 May 2017	Santa Cruz	1–1	Náutico	Recife
20:00 (UTC-3)	Éverton Santos 45+2'	Report	Anselmo 84'	Stadium: Estádio José do Rego Maciel (Arruda); Attendance: 3,387; Referee: Luiz Cláudio Sobral

==== Record ====
Final Position	Points	Matches	Wins	Draws	Losses	Goals For	Goals Away	Avg%
3rd	23	14	6	5	3	23	14	54%

=== Copa do Brasil ===
==== Round of 16 ====
10 May 2017	Santa Cruz	0–0	Atlético Paranaense	Recife
21:45 (UTC-3)		Report		Stadium: Estádio José do Rego Maciel (Arruda); Attendance: 4,030; Referee: Grazianni Maciel Rocha

31 May 2017	Atlético Paranaense	2–0	Santa Cruz	Curitiba
19:30 (UTC-3)	Nikão 5'; González 68'	Report+		Stadium: Estádio Joaquim Américo Guimarães (Arena da Baixada); Attendance: 16,683; Referee: Elmo Alves Resende Cunha

==== Record ====
Final Position	Points	Matches	Wins	Draws	Losses	Goals For	Goals Away	Avg%
15th	1	2	0	1	1	0	2	16%

=== Série B ===
13 May 2017 1	Criciúma	1–2	Santa Cruz	Criciúma
16:30 (UTC-3)	Diogo Mateus 45'	Report	Vítor 51'; William Barbio 86'	Stadium: Estádio Heriberto Hülse; Attendance: 3,376; Referee: Roger Goulart

20 May 2017 2	Santa Cruz	2–1	Guarani	Recife
16:30 (UTC-3)	Halef Pitbull 4'; Ricardo Bueno 83'	Report	Eliandro 79'	Stadium: Estádio José do Rego Maciel (Arruda); Attendance: 6,090; Referee: Daniel Nobre Bins

23 May 2017 3	CRB	1–0	Santa Cruz	Maceió
19:15 (UTC-3)	Neto Baiano 74'	Report		Stadium: Estádio Rei Pelé; Attendance: 3,660; Referee: Adriano Milczvski

3 June 2017 4	Santa Cruz	2–1	ABC	Recife
16:30 (UTC-3)	Roberto 36'; André Luis 48'	Report	Adriano Pardal 39'	Stadium: Estádio José do Rego Maciel (Arruda); Attendance: 4,834; Referee: Cleisson Veloso Pereira

6 June 2017 5	Goiás	2–1	Santa Cruz	Goiânia
20:30 (UTC-3)	Carlos Eduardo 12', 72'	Report	Anderson Salles 45'	Stadium: Estádio do Governo do Estado de Goiás (Serra Dourada); Attendance: 3,489; Referee: Rodrigo Guarizo Ferreira do Amaral

9 June 2017 6	Santa Cruz	1–3	Londrina	Recife
20:30 (UTC-3)	João Paulo 84'	Report	Germano 45+1'; Artur 51', 82'	Stadium: Estádio José do Rego Maciel (Arruda); Attendance: 5,045; Referee: Jean Pierre Goncalves Lima

13 June 2017 7	Ceará	1–3	Santa Cruz	Fortaleza
21:30 (UTC-3)	Pedro Ken 25'	Report	Léo Lima 62'; Bruno Paulo 70'; Ricardo Bueno 80'	Stadium: Estádio Governador Plácido Castelo (Castelão); Attendance: 8,839; Referee: Wanderson Alves de Sousa

17 June 2017 8	Santa Cruz	0–0	Internacional	Recife
16:30 (UTC-3)		Report		Stadium: Estádio José do Rego Maciel (Arruda); Attendance: 25,356; Referee: Rodrigo D Alonso Ferreira

20 June 2017 9	América–MG	1–0	Santa Cruz	Belo Horizonte
19:15 (UTC-3)	Matheusinho 78'	Report		Stadium: Estádio Raimundo Sampaio (Independência); Attendance: 2,495; Referee: Dyorgines Jose Padovani de Andrade

24 June 2017 10	Santa Cruz	1–1	Figueirense	São Lourenço da Mata
16:30 (UTC-3)	Augusto 62'	Report	Henan 45+1'	Stadium: Estádio Governador Carlos Wilson Campos (Arena Pernambuco); Attendance: 9,079; Referee: Rodrigo Nunes de Sá

1 July 2017 11	Oeste	2–0	Santa Cruz	Barueri
16:30 (UTC-3)	Velicka 42'; Fernando Aguiar 90+2'	Report		Stadium: Arena Barueri; Attendance: 1,790; Referee: Luiz César de Oliveira Magalhães

7 July 2017 12	Santa Cruz	3–0	Brasil de Pelotas	São Lourenço da Mata
19:15 (UTC-3)	Derley 29'; João Paulo 43'; Ricardo Bueno 72'	Report		Stadium: Estádio Governador Carlos Wilson Campos (Arena Pernambuco); Attendance: 6,009; Referee: Marielson Alves Silva

11 July 2017 13	Luverdense	2–2	Santa Cruz	Lucas do Rio Verde
21:30 (UTC-3)	Sérgio Mota 8', 58'	Report	Augusto 46'; Bruno Silva 88'	Stadium: Estádio Municipal Passo das Emas; Attendance: 1,297; Referee: Savio Pereira Sampaio

15 July 2017 14	Náutico	0–0	Santa Cruz	São Lourenço da Mata
16:30 (UTC-3)		Report		Stadium: Estádio Governador Carlos Wilson Campos (Arena Pernambuco); Attendance: 13,450; Referee: Elmo Alves Resende Cunha

18 July 2017 15	Santa Cruz	1–0	Vila Nova	São Lourenço da Mata
20:30 (UTC-3)	André Luis 54'	Report		Stadium: Estádio Governador Carlos Wilson Campos (Arena Pernambuco); Attendance: 6,731; Referee: Paulo H Schleich Vollkopf

21 July 2017 16	Santa Cruz	1–1	Boa Esporte	São Lourenço da Mata
20:30 (UTC-3)	João Paulo 43'	Report	Thaciano 70'	Stadium: Estádio Governador Carlos Wilson Campos (Arena Pernambuco); Attendance: 6,451; Referee: Antonio Dib Moraes de Sousa

29 July 2017 17	Paraná	4–0	Santa Cruz	Curitiba
16:30 (UTC-3)	Alemão 19'; Minho 27'; Iago Maidana 49'; Renatinho 54'	Report		Stadium: Estádio Durival Britto e Silva (Estádio Vila Capanema); Attendance: 11,566; Referee: Francisco Carlos do Nascimento

1 August 2017 18	Santa Cruz	1–2	Paysandu	São Lourenço da Mata
20:30 (UTC-3)	Ricardo Bueno 37'	Report	Ayrton 47'; Bergson 86'	Stadium: Estádio Governador Carlos Wilson Campos (Arena Pernambuco); Attendance: 3,603; Referee: Pablo dos Santos Alves

5 August 2017 19	Juventude	2–1	Santa Cruz	Caxias do Sul
16:30 (UTC-3)	Tiago Marques 64', 71'	Report	Júlio César 81'	Stadium: Estádio Alfredo Jaconi; Attendance: 4,561; Referee: Salim Fende Chavez

8 August 2017 20	Santa Cruz	1–2	Criciúma	Recife
19:15 (UTC-3)	André Luis 28'	Report	Silvinho 46'; Alex Maranhão 75'	Stadium: Estádio José do Rego Maciel (Arruda); Attendance: 4,308; Referee: Caio Max Augusto Vieira

19 August 2017 21	Guarani	2–0	Santa Cruz	Campinas
16:30 (UTC-3)	Willian Rocha 6'; Ewerton Páscoa 9'	Report		Stadium: Estádio Brinco de Ouro da Princesa; Attendance: 2,563; Referee: Emerson de Almeida Ferreira

26 August 2017 22	Santa Cruz	1–2	CRB	Recife
16:30 (UTC-3)	Grafite 32'	Report	Tony 59'; Chico 88'	Stadium: Estádio José do Rego Maciel (Arruda); Attendance: 8,110; Referee: Alinor Silva da Paixão

9 September 2017 23	ABC	0–0	Santa Cruz	Natal
19:00 (UTC-3)		Report		Stadium: Arena das Dunas; Attendance: 3,395; Referee: Jean Pierre Goncalves Lima

15 September 2017 24	Santa Cruz	3–0	Goiás	Recife
19:15 (UTC-3)	João Paulo 3'; Bruno Paulo 84', 87'	Report		Stadium: Estádio José do Rego Maciel (Arruda); Attendance: 5,206; Referee: Daniel Nobre Bins

22 September 2017 25	Londrina	1–1	Santa Cruz	Londrina
21:30 (UTC-3)	Ricardinho 74'	Report	Wellington 63'	Stadium: Estádio Jacy Scaff (do Café); Attendance: 3,810; Referee: Thiago Duarte Peixoto

26 September 2017 26	Santa Cruz	0–0	Ceará	Recife
19:15 (UTC-3)		Report		Stadium: Estádio José do Rego Maciel (Arruda); Attendance: 9,317; Referee: Leonardo Garcia Cavaleiro

30 September 2017 27	Internacional	2–0	Santa Cruz	Porto Alegre
16:30 (UTC-3)	D'Alessandro 9', 71'	Report		Stadium: Estádio José Pinheiro Borda (Beira-Rio); Attendance: 23,419; Referee: Alisson Sidnei Furtado

7 October 2017 28	Santa Cruz	0–1	América–MG	Recife
19:00 (UTC-3)		Report	Matheusinho 78'	Stadium: Estádio José do Rego Maciel (Arruda); Attendance: 9,083; Referee: Flávio Rodrigues de Souza

14 October 2017 29	Figueirense	2–1	Santa Cruz	Florianópolis
16:30 (UTC-3)	Zé Eduardo 28'; Renan Mota 37'	Report	Anderson Salles 79'	Stadium: Estádio Orlando Scarpelli; Attendance: 3,537; Referee: Sávio Pereira Sampaio

17 October 2017 30	Santa Cruz	2–2	Oeste	Recife
20:30 (UTC-3)	Grafite 55'; João Paulo 79'	Report	Mazinho 30', 61'	Stadium: Estádio José do Rego Maciel (Arruda); Attendance: 7,636; Referee: Elmo Alves Resende Cunha

21 October 2017 31	Brasil de Pelotas	1–1	Santa Cruz	Pelotas
17:30 (UTC-3)	Marlon 73'	Report	João Ananias 29'	Stadium: Estádio Bento Mendes de Freitas; Attendance: 3,023; Referee: Marcos Mateus Pereira

28 October 2017 32	Santa Cruz	0–0	Luverdense	Recife
17:30 (UTC-3)		Report		Stadium: Estádio José do Rego Maciel (Arruda); Attendance: 10,520; Referee: Rodolpho Toski Marques

4 November 2017 33	Santa Cruz	2–3	Náutico	Recife
17:30 (UTC-3)	Anderson Salles 45+1'; João Paulo 48'	Report	William 32', 58', 90+5'	Stadium: Estádio José do Rego Maciel (Arruda); Attendance: 8,564; Referee: Thiago Duarte Peixoto

7 November 2017 34	Vila Nova	1–1	Santa Cruz	Goiânia
19:15 (UTC-3)	Geovane 33'	Report	Ricardo Bueno 58'	Stadium: Estádio do Governo do Estado de Goiás (Serra Dourada); Attendance: 4,496; Referee: Emerson de Almeida Ferreira

11 November 2017 35	Boa Esporte	4–2	Santa Cruz	Varginha
17:30 (UTC-3)	Rodolfo 13', 63', 66'; Wesley 79'	Report	Ricardo Bueno 16'; Grafite 82'	Stadium: Estádio Municipal Prefeito Dilson Luiz de Melo (Melão); Attendance: 760; Referee: Paulo Roberto Alves Junior

14 November 2017 36	Santa Cruz	0–0	Paraná	Recife
21:30 (UTC-3)		Report		Stadium: Estádio José do Rego Maciel (Arruda); Attendance: 2,005; Referee: Ricardo Marques Ribeiro

18 November 2017 37	Paysandu	4–2	Santa Cruz	Belém
17:30 (UTC-3)	Bergson 27', 61', 87'; Fábio Matos 29'	Report	Augusto 57'; Marcílio 75'	Stadium: Estádio Leônidas Sodré de Castro (Curuzu); Attendance: 5,362; Referee: Jean Pierre Gonçalves Lima

21 November 2017 38	Santa Cruz	5–2	Juventude	Recife
20:00 (UTC-3)	Anderson Salles 40'; William Barbio 43', 68'; Marcílio 56'; Halef Pitbull 58'	Report	Mateus Santana 50'; Felipe Lima 88'	Stadium: Estádio José do Rego Maciel (Arruda); Attendance: 1,502; Referee: Paulo Henrique de Melo Salmazio

==== Record ====
Final Position	Points	Matches	Wins	Draws	Losses	Goals For	Goals Away	Avg%
18th	37	38	8	13	17	43	54	32%
