= 1982 São Paulo FC season =

São Paulo
1982 season
- Chairman: Antônio Leme Nunes Galvão
- Manager: Chico Formiga (until June 19); José Poy
- Série A: Quarterfinals
- Torneio dos Campeões: Quarterfinal
- Campeonato Paulista: Runners-up
- Copa Libertadores: Group stage
- Top goalscorer: League: Serginho (20); All: Serginho (34)

The 1982 season was São Paulo's 53rd season since club's existence.

== Statistics ==
=== Scorers ===
Position	Nation	Playing position	Name	Campeonato Brasileiro	Torneio dos Campeões	Campeonato Paulista	Copa Libertadores	Others	Total
1	(Brazil)	FW	Serginho	20	0	10	4	0	34
2	(Brazil)	FW	Renato	12	0	10	0	2	24
3	(Brazil)	MF	Éverton	6	0	9	1	2	18
4	(Uruguay)	DF	Darío Pereyra	2	0	5	0	1	8
=	(Brazil)	FW	Paulo César	0	1	5	0	2	8
5	(Brazil)	FW	Jaiminho	1	1	2	0	1	5
=	(Brazil)	MF	Mário Sérgio	1	0	4	0	0	5
=	(Brazil)	FW	Sávio	0	0	4	1	0	5
6	(Brazil)	DF	Getúlio	1	1	1	1	0	4
7	(Brazil)	MF	Heriberto	0	0	3	0	0	3
=	(Brazil)	DF	Marinho Chagas	0	1	1	0	1	3
=	(Brazil)	DF	Oscar	0	0	3	0	0	3
8	(Brazil)	DF	Edel	0	0	2	0	0	2
=	(Brazil)	MF	Ricardo	0	1	0	0	1	2
=	(Brazil)	FW	Tatu	0	1	1	0	0	2
=	(Brazil)	FW	Zé Sérgio	0	0	2	0	0	2
9	(Brazil)	MF	Almir	0	0	1	0	0	1
=	(Brazil)	FW	Bugre	0	0	0	0	1	1
=	(Brazil)	MF	Carlinhos Maracanã	0	0	1	0	0	1
=	(Brazil)	DF	Nelsinho	0	0	0	0	1	1
			Own goals	0	0	0	0	1	1
			Total	43	6	64	7	13	133

== Overall ==
Games played	83 (18 Campeonato Brasileiro, 9 Torneio dos Campeões, 40 Campeonato Paulista, 6 Copa Libertadores, 10 Friendly match)
Games won	50 (11 Campeonato Brasileiro, 5 Torneio dos Campeões, 23 Campeonato Paulista, 2 Copa Libertadores, 9 Friendly match)
Games drawn	14 (1 Campeonato Brasileiro, 2 Torneio dos Campeões, 9 Campeonato Paulista, 2 Copa Libertadores, 0 Friendly match)
Games lost	19 (6 Campeonato Brasileiro, 2 Torneio dos Campeões, 8 Campeonato Paulista, 2 Copa Libertadores, 1 Friendly match)
Goals scored	135
Goals conceded	74
Goal difference	+61
Best result	6–1 (A) v Guarani - Campeonato Paulista - 1982.10.31
Worst result	1–3 (A) v Anapolina - Campeonato Brasileiro - 1982.2.28; 1–3 (A) v Palmeiras - Campeonato Paulista - 1982.10.17; 1–3 (A) v Corinthians - Campeonato Paulista - 1982.12.12
Top scorer	Serginho (34)

Source: São Paulo FC

== Friendlies ==
January 25 National	São Paulo (São Paulo (state))	0–1	(São Paulo (state)) VIVA São Paulo XI (Note: Formed by players from Corinthians, Palmeiras, Portuguesa and Juventus. Celebration of the São Paulo city anniversary.)	São Paulo
				Stadium: Estádio Cícero Pompeu de Toledo (Morumbi)

March 20 National	São Bento (São Paulo (state))	1–2	(São Paulo (state)) São Paulo	Sorocaba
				Stadium: Estádio Walter Ribeiro

April 17 National	Santos (São Paulo (state))	0–2	(São Paulo (state)) São Paulo	Santos
			Marinho Chagas 44'; Éverton 65'	Stadium: Estádio Urbano Caldeira (Vila Belmiro); Attendance: 6,799; Referee: Márcio Sales

June 12 National	Taubaté (São Paulo (state))	1–2	(São Paulo (state)) São Paulo	Taubaté
	Vilmar 61'		Nelsinho 11'; Bugre 46'	Stadium: Estádio Joquim de Morais Filho; Attendance: 1,719; Referee: Cláudio Galeazzo

June 19 National	Santo André (São Paulo (state))	0–1	(São Paulo (state)) São Paulo	Santo André
			Pereyra 65'	Stadium: Estádio Municipal Bruno José Daniel; Attendance: 1,603; Referee: Edson Maisa

June 27 National	Cruzeiro-SP (São Paulo (state))	0–1	(São Paulo (state)) São Paulo	Cruzeiro
			Ricardo 3'	Stadium: Estádio Doutor Vigílio Antunes de Oliveira; Attendance: 1,914; Referee: Almir Laguna

November 10 Taça Jacy Scanacatta	Cascavel (Paraná (state))	0–1	(São Paulo (state)) São Paulo	Cascavel
			Paulo César 34'	Stadium: Estádio Olímpico Regional Arnaldo Buzzato; Attendance: 27,244; Referee: Alceu Corenado

=== Sunshine International Series ===
July 24 International	Fort Lauderdale Strikers (United States)	1–2	(Brazil) São Paulo	Fort Lauderdale
	Hudson 44'	Report	Renato 27', 68'	Stadium: Lockhart Stadium; Attendance: 5,887; Referee: Manuel Ortiz

July 28 International	Tampa Bay Rowdies (United States)	2–3	(Brazil) São Paulo	Tampa
	Fernando 17'; Kozić 61'	Report	Everton 15'; Paulo César 58'; Van der Beck 81' (o.g.)	Stadium: Tampa Stadium; Attendance: 8,353

July 31 International	Ipswich Town (England)	0–1	(Brazil) São Paulo	Tampa
		Report	Jaiminho 22'	Stadium: Tampa Stadium; Attendance: 21,220; Referee: David Socha

== Official competitions ==
=== Campeonato Brasileiro ===
January 16 Group C round 1	São Paulo	5–0	Treze	São Paulo
	Serginho 22', 57', 75'; Renato 27', 41'			Stadium: Estádio Municipal Paulo Machado de Carvalho (Pacaembu); Attendance: 21,018; Referee: Eraldo Palmerini

January 20 Group C round 2	Flamengo	3–2	São Paulo	Rio de Janeiro
	Zico 58', 81'; Andrade 70'		Serginho 14', 41'	Stadium: Estádio Jornalista Mário Filho (Maracanã); Attendance: 85,236; Referee: Aírton Bernardoni

January 28 Group C round 3	São Paulo	4–0	Ferroviário	São Paulo
	Serginho 32', 42', 74', 76'			Stadium: Estádio Cícero Pompeu de Toledo (Morumbi); Attendance: 5,859; Referee: Roque Gallas

January 31 Group C round 4	Náutico	1–4	São Paulo	Recife
	Brás 83'		Serginho 24', 40'; Renato 42', 75'	Stadium: Estádio José do Rego Maciel (Arruda); Attendance: 17,214; Referee: Maurílio Santiago

February 3 Group C round 5	Treze	0–3	São Paulo	Campina Grande
			Renato 9', 22', 88'	Stadium: Estádio Governador Ernani Sátyro (Amigão); Attendance: 22,062; Referee: Sebastião Rufino

February 7 Group C round 6	Ferroviário	1–2	São Paulo	Fortaleza
	Vicente 44'		Serginho 56'; Getúlio 89'	Stadium: Estádio Plácido Aderaldo Castelo (Castelão); Attendance: 18,126; Referee: Arivaldo Seixas

February 10 Group C round 7	São Paulo	1–1	Náutico	São Paulo
	Éverton 15'		Cláudio 23'	Stadium: Estádio Municipal Paulo Machado de Carvalho (Pacaembu); Attendance: 14,024; Referee: Alvimar Reis

February 16 Group C round 8	São Paulo	3–4	Flamengo	São Paulo
	Renato 8'; Pereyra 58'; Éverton 71'		Nunes 20'; Lico 22'; Tita 49'; Zico 55'	Stadium: Estádio Cícero Pompeu de Toledo (Morumbi); Attendance: 70,857; Referee: Édson Amorim

February 28 Group O round 1	Atlético Paranaense	1–3	São Paulo	Curitiba
	Lino 2'		Serginho 12', 25'; Éverton 76'	Stadium: Estádio Major Antônio Couto Pereira; Attendance: 57,324; Referee: José Roberto Wright

March 7 Group O round 2	São Paulo	2–1	Ponte Preta	São Paulo
	Éverton 38', 79'		Osvaldo 82'	Stadium: Estádio Cícero Pompeu de Toledo (Morumbi); Attendance: 19,955; Referee: Wilson dos Santos

March 11 Group O round 3	São Paulo	5–2	Ceará	São Paulo
	Éverton 12'; Renato 15'; Serginho 26', 36'; Mário Sérgio 42'		Ramon 39', 76'	Stadium: Estádio Cícero Pompeu de Toledo (Morumbi); Attendance: 6,688; Referee: Arnaldo César Coelho

March 14 Group O round 4	Ponte Preta	1–0	São Paulo	Campinas
	Ronaldo 61'			Stadium: Estádio Moisés Lucarelli; Attendance: 8,733; Referee: Luís Carlos Félix

March 17 Group O round 5	Ceará	2–3	São Paulo	Fortaleza
	Ramon 21'; Ademir 79'		Renato 1', 20', 73'	Stadium: Estádio Plácido Aderaldo Castelo (Castelão); Attendance: 24,174; Referee: Valquir Pimentel

March 25 Group O round 6	São Paulo	1–0	Atlético Paranaense	São Paulo
	Serginho 44'			Stadium: Estádio Municipal Paulo Machado de Carvalho (Pacaembu); Attendance: 3,667; Referee: Luís Guaranha

March 28 Round of 16	Anapolina	3–1	São Paulo	Anápolis
	Mateus 15'; Sávio 27', 66'		Jaiminho 45'	Stadium: Estádio Jonas Duarte; Attendance: 17,005; Referee: Wilson dos Santos

March 31 Round of 16	São Paulo	4–0	Anapolina	São Paulo
	Serginho 3', 41', 70'; Pereyra 21'			Stadium: Estádio Cícero Pompeu de Toledo (Morumbi); Attendance: 24,947; Referee: Nei Nunesmaia

April 4 Quarterfinals	São Paulo	0–1	Guarani	São Paulo
			Careca 44'	Stadium: Estádio Cícero Pompeu de Toledo (Morumbi); Attendance: 45,822; Referee: José Roberto Wright

April 7 Quarterfinals	Guarani	2–0	São Paulo	Campinas
	Éderson 58'; Rubens 59'			Stadium: Estádio Brinco de Ouro da Princesa; Attendance: 32,134; Referee: Arnaldo César Coelho

==== Record ====
Final Position	Points	Matches	Wins	Draws	Losses	Goals For	Goals Away	Win%
6th	23	18	11	1	6	43	23	64%

=== Torneio dos Campeões ===
April 25 Round 1	São Paulo	0–0	Vasco da Gama	São Paulo
				Stadium: Estádio Municipal Paulo Machado de Carvalho (Pacaembu); Attendance: 3,786; Referee: José Leandro Serpa

April 27 Round 2	São Paulo	1–0	Guarani	São Paulo
	Jaiminho 90'			Stadium: Estádio Cícero Pompeu de Toledo (Morumbi); Attendance: 835; Referee: Hélio Cosso

May 1 Round 3	Santos	0–1	São Paulo	Santos
			Ricardo 5'	Stadium: Estádio Urbano Caldeira (Vila Belmiro); Attendance: 13,541; Referee: Aristóteles Cantalice

May 6 Round 4	Botafogo	0–1	São Paulo	Rio de Janeiro
			Getúlio 63'	Stadium: Estádio Jornalista Mário Filho (Maracanã); Attendance: 6,616; Referee: Eraldo Palmerin

May 15 Round 5	Guarani	2–1	São Paulo	Campinas
	Jorge Mendonça 2'; Henrique 64'		Marinho 88'	Stadium: Estádio Brinco de Ouro da Princesa; Attendance: 3,474; Referee: Wilson dos Santos

May 18 Round 6	Vasco da Gama	0–0	São Paulo	Rio de Janeiro
				Stadium: Estádio Jornalista Mário Filho (Maracanã); Attendance: 4,818; Referee: Luís Valdir Louruz

May 23 Round 7	São Paulo	1–0	Botafogo	São Paulo
	Tatu 50'			Stadium: Estádio Cícero Pompeu de Toledo (Morumbi); Attendance: 763; Referee: Manuel Serapião

May 25 Round 8	São Paulo	1–0	Santos	São Paulo
	Paulo César 2'			Stadium: Estádio Cícero Pompeu de Toledo (Morumbi); Attendance: 1,159; Referee: José Roberto Wright

June 6 Quarterfinal	São Paulo	0–1	Guarani	São Paulo
			Jorge Mendonça 64'	Stadium: Estádio Cícero Pompeu de Toledo (Morumbi); Attendance: 1,338; Referee: Romualdo Arppi Filho

==== Record ====
Final Position	Points	Matches	Wins	Draws	Losses	Goals For	Goals Away	Win%
5th	12	9	5	2	2	6	3	67%

=== Campeonato Paulista ===
July 3 First stage 1	Comercial	1–0	São Paulo	Ribeirão Preto
	Luís Alberto 3'			Stadium: Estádio Dr. Francisco de Palma Travassos; Attendance: 1,908; Referee: Ulisses Tavares

July 6 First stage 2	São Paulo	1–0	Santo André	São Paulo
	Carlinhos Maracanã 90'			Stadium: Estádio Municipal Paulo Machado de Carvalho (Pacaembu); Attendance: 1,643; Referee: Joel Caires

July 9 First stage 3	São Paulo	2–1	São José	São Paulo
	Sávio 46', 82'		Tião Marinho 3'	Stadium: Estádio Municipal Paulo Machado de Carvalho (Pacaembu); Attendance: 2,021; Referee: Édson Massa

July 12 First stage 4	Taubaté	2–2	São Paulo	Taubaté
	Élvio 50'; Vilmar 85'		Éverton 37', 76'	Stadium: Estádio Joaquim de Morais Filho; Attendance: 7,545; Referee: Luís Carlos Antunes

July 15 First stage 5	São Paulo	1–0	Botafogo	São Paulo
	Paulo César 83'			Stadium: Estádio Municipal Paulo Machado de Carvalho (Pacaembu); Attendance: 12,494; Referee: Romualdo Arppi Filho

July 18 First stage 6	São Paulo	0–1	Juventus	São Paulo
			Ilo 16'	Stadium: Estádio Municipal Paulo Machado de Carvalho (Pacaembu); Attendance: 9,397; Referee: Nílson Bilha

July 21 First stage 7	Ferroviária	1–3	São Paulo	Araraquara
	Marinho 69'		Jaiminho 33'; Oscar 40'; Paulo César 83'	Stadium: Estádio Doutor Adhemar de Barros (Fonte Luminosa); Attendance: 8,002; Referee: João Leopoldo Aieta

August 5 First stage 8	São Paulo	1–0	Marília	São Paulo
	Mário Sérgio 30'			Stadium: Estádio Cícero Pompeu de Toledo (Morumbi); Attendance: 2,501; Referee: José Novais

August 8 First stage 9	Internacional	1–1	São Paulo	Limeira
	Mário 56'		Edel 9'	Stadium: Estádio Major José Levy Sobrinho; Attendance: 18,247; Referee: Ezequiel Pedroso

August 11 First stage 10	São Paulo	2–0	Francana	São Paulo
	Sávio 18'; Éverton 90'			Stadium: Estádio Cícero Pompeu de Toledo (Morumbi); Attendance: 874; Referee: Almir Laguna

August 22 First stage 11	América	1–1	São Paulo	São José do Rio Preto
	Rubão 90'		Sávio 85'	Stadium: Estádio Mário Alves Mendonça; Attendance: 8,944; Referee: Antônio Gomes

August 25 First stage 12	São Bento	0–0	São Paulo	Sorocaba
				Stadium: Estádio Municipal Wálter Ribeiro; Attendance: 14,044; Referee: José de Assis Aragão

August 28 First stage 13	São Paulo	4–1	Portuguesa	São Paulo
	Edel 27'; Serginho 64', 72', 78'		Humberto 40'	Stadium: Estádio Cícero Pompeu de Toledo (Morumbi); Attendance: 10,035; Referee: Mauro Félix

August 31 First stage 14	São Paulo	2–2	Guarani	São Paulo
	Mário Sérgio 19', 87'		Ernani 49'; Careca 51'	Stadium: Estádio Cícero Pompeu de Toledo (Morumbi); Attendance: 4,975; Referee: Dulcídio Wanderley Boschilia

September 5 First stage 15	Palmeiras	2–0	São Paulo	São Paulo
	Baltazar 15'; Aragonés 22'			Stadium: Estádio Cícero Pompeu de Toledo (Morumbi); Attendance: 33,153; Referee: Marcio Sales

September 9 First stage 16	Santos	1–1	São Paulo	São Paulo
	Paulinho 58'		Renato 18'	Stadium: Estádio Cícero Pompeu de Toledo (Morumbi); Attendance: 10,766; Referee: Emídio Marques de Mesquita

September 12 First stage 17	São Paulo	0–2	Corinthians	São Paulo
			Casagrande 27', 36'	Stadium: Estádio Cícero Pompeu de Toledo (Morumbi); Attendance: 61,928; Referee: Romualdo Arppi Filho

September 18 First stage 18	Ponte Preta	1–2	São Paulo	Campinas
	Osvaldo 58'		Mário Sérgio 46'; Éverton 49'	Stadium: Estádio Moisés Lucarelli; Attendance: 2,844; Referee: Emídio Marques de Mesquita

September 23 First stage 19	São Paulo	2–1	XV de Jaú	São Paulo
	Serginho 13'; Éverton 76'		César 67'	Stadium: Estádio Cícero Pompeu de Toledo (Morumbi); Attendance: 4,747; Referee: Romualdo Arppi Filho

September 26 Second stage 1	Marília	2–1	São Paulo	Marília
	Candido 50', 60'		Tatu 75'	Stadium: Estádio Municipal Bento de Abreu Sampaio Vidal; Attendance: 8,399; Referee: Dulcídio Wanderley Boschilia

September 29 Second stage 2	São Paulo	3–0	Taubaté	São Paulo
	Almir 14'; Éverton 35'; Serginho 49'			Stadium: Estádio Cícero Pompeu de Toledo (Morumbi); Attendance: 1,049; Referee: Almir Laguna

October 3 Second stage 3	São Paulo	0–0	Santos	São Paulo
				Stadium: Estádio Cícero Pompeu de Toledo (Morumbi); Attendance: 14,620; Referee: Emídio Marques de Mesquita

October 6 Second stage 4	São Paulo	1–1	América	São Paulo
	Serginho 30'		Rota 29'	Stadium: Estádio Cícero Pompeu de Toledo (Morumbi); Attendance: 1,361; Referee: Ulisses Tavares

October 10 Second stage 5	Francana	0–1	São Paulo	Franca
			Pereyra 22'	Stadium: Estádio Municipal Doutor José Lancha Filho; Attendance: 10,532; Referee: Roberto Nunes Morgado

October 13 Second stage 6	São Paulo	4–1	Ferroviária	São Paulo
	Marinho Chagas 25'; Heriberto 31', 60'; Paulo César 52'		Marcão 86'	Stadium: Estádio Cícero Pompeu de Toledo (Morumbi); Attendance: 1,238; Referee: Dulcídio Wanderley Boschilia

October 17 Second stage 7	Palmeiras	3–1	São Paulo	São Paulo
	Jorginho 44'; Baltazar 53', 89'		Éverton 45'	Stadium: Estádio Cícero Pompeu de Toledo (Morumbi); Attendance: 28,428; Referee: José de Assis Aragão

October 20 Second stage 8	São Paulo	2–0	Internacional	São Paulo
	Renato 2'; Serginho 71'			Stadium: Estádio Cícero Pompeu de Toledo (Morumbi); Attendance: 1,335; Referee: Ezequiel Pedroso

October 24 Second stage 9	Botafogo	1–1	São Paulo	Ribeirão Preto
	Fernando 19'		Renato 85'	Stadium: Estádio Santa Cruz; Attendance: 8,502; Referee: Romualdo Arppi Filho

October 28 Second stage 10	XV de Jaú	0–2	São Paulo	Jaú
			Renato 72'; Éverton 79'	Stadium: Estádio Municipal José Magalhães de Almeida Prado; Attendance: 7,564; Referee: José Guidotti

October 31 Second stage 11	Guarani	1–6	São Paulo	Campinas
	Careca 18'		Heriberto 21'; Renato 28', 42'; Paulo César 63'; Éverton 82'; Oscar 90'	Stadium: Estádio Brinco de Ouro da Princesa; Attendance: 7,895; Referee: Roberto Nunes Morgado

November 3 Second stage 12	São Paulo	2–1	Ponte Preta	São Paulo
	Oscar 40'; Zé Sérgio 50'		Chicão 64'	Stadium: Estádio Cícero Pompeu de Toledo (Morumbi); Attendance: 9,435; Referee: João Leopoldo Aieta

November 7 Second stage 13	Portuguesa	0–2	São Paulo	São Paulo
			Pereyra 7'; Serginho 86'	Stadium: Estádio Doutor Oswaldo Teixeira Duarte (Canindé); Attendance: 19,360; Referee: Romualdo Arppi Filho

November 13 Second stage 14	São José	0–1	São Paulo	São José dos Campos
			Getúlio 51'	Stadium: Estádio Municipal Martins Pereira; Attendance: 11,676; Referee: Romualdo Arppi Filho

November 17 Second stage 15	Juventus	2–3	São Paulo	São Paulo
	Sídnei 43', 70'		Pereyra 37'; Paulo César 74'; Renato 85'	Stadium: Estádio Municipal Paulo Machado de Carvalho (Pacaembu); Attendance: 7,330; Referee: Dulcídio Wanderley Boschilia

November 21 Second stage 16	São Paulo	2–0	Comercial	São Paulo
	Renato 28'; Zé Sérgio 90'			Stadium: Estádio Cícero Pompeu de Toledo (Morumbi); Attendance: 8,280; Referee: Emídio Marques de Mesquita

November 25 Second stage 17	Santo André	0–1	São Paulo	Santo André
			Jaiminho 86'	Stadium: Estádio Municipal Bruno José Daniel; Attendance: 10,439; Referee: Roberto Nunes Morgado

November 28 Second stage 18	São Paulo	2–0	São Bento	São Paulo
	Renato 28'; Serginho 35'			Stadium: Estádio Cícero Pompeu de Toledo (Morumbi); Attendance: 13,550; Referee: José de Assis Aragão

December 5 Second stage 19	Corinthians	2–3	São Paulo	São Paulo
	Wladimir 25'; Ataliba 67'		Pereyra 27'; Serginho 39'; Renato 87'	Stadium: Estádio Cícero Pompeu de Toledo (Morumbi); Attendance: 117,061; Referee: José de Assis Aragão

December 8 Finals	São Paulo	0–1	Corinthians	São Paulo
			Sócrates 59'	Stadium: Estádio Cícero Pompeu de Toledo (Morumbi); Attendance: 23,039; Referee: Romualdo Arppi Filho

December 12 Finals	Corinthians	3–1	São Paulo	São Paulo
	Biro-Biro 71', 82'; Casagrande 86'		Pereyra 77'	Stadium: Estádio Cícero Pompeu de Toledo (Morumbi); Attendance: 66,851; Referee: José de Assis Aragão

==== Record ====
Final Position	Points	Matches	Wins	Draws	Losses	Goals For	Goals Away	Win%
2nd	55	40	23	9	8	64	36	69%

=== Copa Libertadores ===
August 13 Group stage 1	São Paulo (Brazil)	2–2	(Brazil) Grêmio	São Paulo
	Serginho 28', 58'		Edmar 8'; Bonamigo 69'	Stadium: Estádio Cícero Pompeu de Toledo (Morumbi); Attendance: 23,123; Referee: José Roberto Wright (BRA)

August 17 Group stage 2	Defensor (Uruguay)	1–3	(Brazil) São Paulo	Montevideo
	da Silva 50'		Getúlio 20'; Serginho 54', 79'	Stadium: Estadio Centenario; Attendance: 4,000; Referee: César Pagano (PER)

August 20 Group stage 3	Peñarol (Uruguay)	1–0	(Brazil) São Paulo	Montevideo
	Olivera 85'			Stadium: Estadio Centenario; Attendance: 45,000; Referee: Carlos Montalban (PER)

September 3 Group stage 4	Grêmio (Brazil)	0–0	(Brazil) São Paulo	Porto Alegre
				Stadium: Estádio Olímpico Monumental; Attendance: 13,524; Referee: Luís Carlos Félix (BRA)

September 14 Group stage 5	São Paulo (Brazil)	0–1	(Uruguay) Peñarol	São Paulo
			Morena 57'	Stadium: Estádio Cícero Pompeu de Toledo (Morumbi); Referee: Sérgio Vasquez (CHI)

September 21 Group stage 6	São Paulo (Brazil)	2–1	(Uruguay) Defensor	São Paulo
	Sávio 22'; Éverton 80'		Forlán 56'	Stadium: Estádio Cícero Pompeu de Toledo (Morumbi); Referee: Claudio Busca (ARG)

==== Record ====
Final Position	Points	Matches	Wins	Draws	Losses	Goals For	Goals Away	Win%
11th	6	6	2	2	2	7	6	50%
