= 1982 in Brazilian football =

Football in Brazil
- Season: 1982

The following article presents a summary of the 1982 football (soccer) season in Brazil, which was the 81st season of competitive football in the country.

== Campeonato Brasileiro Série A ==
Quarterfinals

Team 1	Agg.	Team 2	1st leg	2nd leg
Flamengo	3-2	Santos	2-1	1-1
Grêmio	3-2	Fluminense	1-1	2-1
São Paulo	0-3	Guarani	0-1	0-2
Bangu	2-2	Corinthians	0-1	2-1

Semifinals

Team 1	Agg.	Team 2	1st leg	2nd leg
Corinthians	3-2	Grêmio	1-2	1-3
Flamengo	5-3	Guarani	2-1	3-2

Final

April 18, 1982

Flamengo	1–1	Grêmio

Maracanã

April 21, 1982

Grêmio	0–0	Flamengo

Olímpico

April 25, 1982

Grêmio	0–1	Flamengo

Olímpico

Flamengo declared as the Campeonato Brasileiro champions by aggregate score of 2-1.

=== Relegation ===
The worst placed team in each one of the eight groups in the first stage plus the four clubs eliminated in the qualification/relegation playoff, which are Nacional, River, Ferroviário-CE, Itabaiana, Mixto, Vitória, Taguatinga, Joinville, América (RN), CSA, Goiás and Desportiva, were relegated to the same year's second level.

== Campeonato Brasileiro Série B ==
Quarterfinals

Team 1	Agg.	Team 2	1st leg	2nd leg
River	2-7	Campo Grande	2-3	0-4
CSA	5-2	Mixto	3-1	2-1
Joinville	3-2	Tiradentes-PI	1-0	2-2
Itabaiana	1-7	Uberaba	1-4	0-3

Semifinals

Team 1	Agg.	Team 2	1st leg	2nd leg
Campo Grande	6-0	Uberaba	4-0	2-0
Joinville	3-3	CSA	2-1	1-2

Final

April 11, 1982

CSA	4–3	Campo Grande

April 18, 1982

Campo Grande	2–1	CSA

Campo Grande	3–0	CSA

Campo Grande declared as the Campeonato Brasileiro Série B champions by aggregate score of 8-5.

=== Promotion ===
The competition champion, which is Campo Grande, was promoted to the following year's first level, and the first placed team in each one of the four groups in the second stage, which were América-RJ, Corinthians, São Paulo-RS and Atlético Paranaense, were promoted to the same season's first level's second stage.

== State championship champions ==
State	Champion	State	Champion
Acre	Rio Branco-AC	Paraíba	Treze
Alagoas	CSA	Paraná	Atlético Paranaense
Amapá	Independente	Pernambuco	Sport Recife
Amazonas	Rio Negro	Piauí	Tiradentes
Bahia	Bahia	Rio de Janeiro	Vasco
Ceará	Fortaleza	Rio Grande do Norte	América-RN
Distrito Federal	Brasília	Rio Grande do Sul	Internacional
Espírito Santo	Rio Branco-ES	Rondônia	Flamengo-RO
Goiás	Vila Nova	Roraima	Baré
Maranhão	Moto Club	Santa Catarina	Joinville
Mato Grosso	Mixto	São Paulo	Corinthians
Mato Grosso do Sul	Comercial	Sergipe	Itabaiana; Sergipe^{(1)}
Minas Gerais	Atlético Mineiro	Tocantins	-
Pará	Paysandu		

^{(1)}Itabaiana and Sergipe shared the Sergipe State Championship title.

== Youth competition champions ==
Competition	Champion
Copa São Paulo de Juniores	Ponte Preta

== Other competition champions ==
Competition	Champion
Taça Minas Gerais	Cruzeiro
Torneio dos Campeões	América
Torneio de Integração da Amazônia	Juventus

== Brazilian clubs in international competitions ==
Team	Copa Libertadores 1982
Flamengo	Semifinals
Grêmio	Group stage
São Paulo	Group stage

== Brazil national team ==
The following table lists all the games played by the Brazil national football team in official competitions and friendly matches during 1982.

Date	Opposition	Result	Score	Brazil scorers	Competition
January 26, 1982	East Germany	W	3-1	Paulo Isidoro, Renato, Serginho Chulapa	International Friendly
March 3, 1982	Czechoslovakia	D	1-1	Zico	International Friendly
March 21, 1982	West Germany	W	1-0	Júnior	International Friendly
May 5, 1982	Portugal	W	3-1	Júnior, Éder, Zico	International Friendly
May 19, 1982	Switzerland	D	1-1	Zico	International Friendly
May 27, 1982	Republic of Ireland	W	7-0	Falcão, Sócrates (2), Serginho Chulapa (2), Luizinho, Zico	International Friendly
June 14, 1982	Soviet Union	W	2-1	Sócrates, Éder	World Cup
June 18, 1982	Scotland	W	4-1	Zico, Oscar, Éder, Falcão	World Cup
June 23, 1982	New Zealand	W	4-0	Zico (2), Falcão, Serginho Chulapa	World Cup
July 2, 1982	Argentina	W	3-1	Zico, Serginho Chulapa, Júnior	World Cup
July 5, 1982	Italy	L	2-3	Sócrates, Falcão	World Cup
