= Raphael Rodrigues =

Raphael Rodrigues may refer to:

- Raphael Rodrigues (footballer, 1894-1981), Brazilian football forward
- Raphael Rodrigues (footballer, born 1999), Brazilian football centre-back for Avaí
- Raphael Borges Rodrigues (born 2003), Australian soccer attacking midfielder for Melbourne City
