= Karl (footballer) =

Brazilian footballer (born 1993)

Personal information
- Full name: Karl Cachoeira Della Vedova Júnior
- Date of birth: 7 April 1993 (age 33)
- Place of birth: Tubarão, Brazil
- Height: 1.82 m (6 ft 0 in)
- Position: Midfielder

Team information
- Current team: Ponte Preta (on loan from Boavista)
- Number: 16

Senior career*
Years	Team	Apps	(Gls)
2014–2015	Caxias	40	(1)
2015–2017	Arouca	4	(0)
2015–2016	→ Tondela (loan)	7	(0)
2017–2018	São Luiz	12	(0)
2019	São José	8	(1)
2019	Aimoré	14	(0)
2019	Brusque	13	(0)
2019	São José	22	(2)
2019	São Caetano	8	(0)
2020	Ferroviária	6	(0)
2020	Paraná	28	(1)
2021	São José	3	(0)
2021	Santa Cruz	9	(0)
2021	Caxias	11	(0)
2022	Brasil de Pelotas	30	(1)
2022	Al-Diwaniya		
2023	São José	31	(0)
2024	Ypiranga	9	(0)
2024	Volta Redonda	9	(0)
2025	Treze	15	(1)
2025–2026	Itabaiana	24	(3)
2026	→ Velo Clube (loan)	6	(0)
2026–	Boavista	0	(0)
2026–	→ Ponte Preta (loan)	6	(0)
- * Club domestic league appearances and goals as of 18 November 2026

Karl Cachoeira Della Vedova Júnior (born 7 April 1993) is a Brazilian professional footballer who plays as a midfielder for Ponte Preta, on loan from Boavista.
