= Estádio Benito Agnelo Castellano =

Soccer stadium in Rio Claro, São Paulo, Brazil

Benito Agnelo Castellano
- Benitão
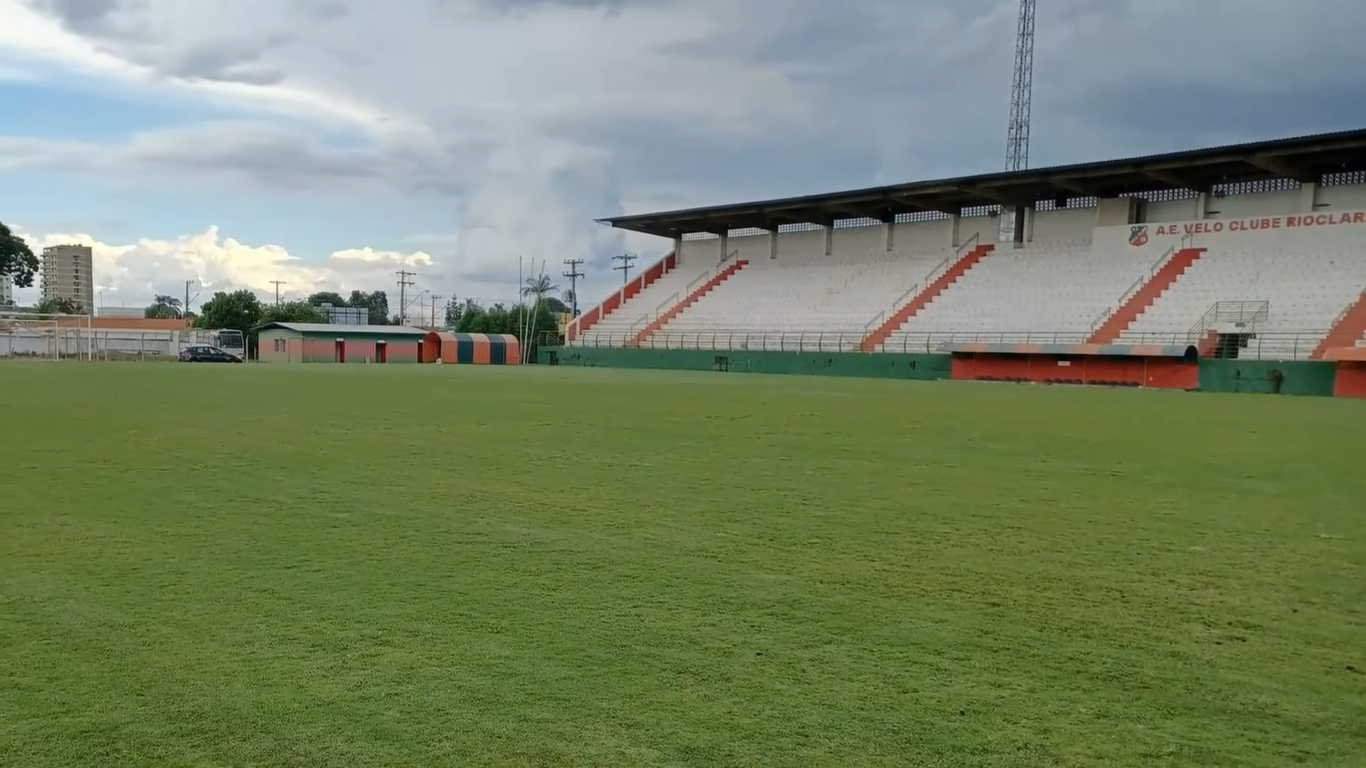
- Interactive map of Benito Agnelo Castellano
- Full name: Estádio Benito Agnelo Castellano
- Former names: Estádio Gigantão do Copacabana (1972–1973)
- Location: Rio Claro, SP, Brazil
- Coordinates: 22.418155938605462°S 47.55651049470814°W
- Owner: City of Rio Claro
- Operator: Velo Clube
- Capacity: 8,136
- Surface: Natural grass
- Record attendance: 15,000+ (Velo Clube 1–0 São José-SP, 17 December 1978)
- Field size: 105 by 66 metres (114.8 yd × 72.2 yd)

Construction
- Built: 1971–1972
- Opened: 7 September 1972
- Renovated: 1978, 2009

Tenant
- Velo Clube

Estádio Benito Agnelo Castellano, sometimes known as Benitão, is a multi-use stadium in Rio Claro, São Paulo, Brazil. It is used mostly for football matches, and has a maximum capacity of 8,136 people.

== History ==
Built in 1972 in the place of a demolished stadium, the new stadium was initially named Gigantão do Copacabana, named after the neighborhood of Copacabana where it was located. The stadium was inaugurated on 7 September 1972, in a match between Velo Clube and Palmeiras, and despite suffering a 4–1 loss, the first goal of the stadium was scored by Velo Clube forward Bertinho Traina.

The stadium was only named Benito Agnelo Castellano in 1973, honouring the man who contributed greatly to Velo Clube during the past decades. Initially a property of Velo, the stadium was sold to the city of Rio Claro in 2008.

In 2024, after Velo Clube's promotion to the 2025 Campeonato Paulista, a project of expansion to a capacity of 10,000 people started. In December of that year, a new lighting system was installed.
