= Luiz Otávio =

Luiz Otávio (or Luís Otávio) may refer to:

- Luis Otávio (footballer, born 2000), born Luis Otávio dos Santos Netto, Brazilian football midfielder
- Luis Otávio (footballer, born 2007), born Luis Otávio Costa de Aquino, Brazilian football midfielder
- Luiz Otávio (footballer, born 1988), born Luiz Otávio Anacleto Leandro, Brazilian football defender
- Luiz Otávio (footballer, born 1992), born Luiz Otávio da Silva Santos, Brazilian football defender
- Luiz Otávio (footballer, born 1997), born Luiz Otávio Alves Marcolino, Brazilian football midfielder

== See also ==
- Tinga (footballer, born 1990), born Luiz Otávio Santos de Araújo, Brazilian football winger
- Nenê Bonilha (born 1992), born Luis Otavio Bonilha de Oliveira, Brazilian football midfielder
