= Caio Felipe (footballer, born February 1999) =

Brazilian footballer (born 1999)

Caio
Personal information
- Full name: Caio Felipe da Silva Rocha
- Date of birth: 2 February 1999 (age 27)
- Place of birth: Rio de Janeiro, Brazil
- Height: 1.78 m (5 ft 10 in)
- Position: Right-back

Team information
- Current team: Itabaiana

Youth career
- –2019: São Paulo

Senior career*
Years	Team	Apps	(Gls)
2019–2022	São Paulo	0	(0)
2020	→ CSA (loan)	5	(0)
2022–2023	Maringá FC	10	(0)
2023	Joinville	6	(0)
2024	Nação	5	(0)
2024	Monte Azul	14	(0)
2025	Taubaté	18	(0)
2025–	Itabaiana	18	(0)
- * Club domestic league appearances and goals as of 11 November 2026

Caio Felipe da Silva Rocha (born 2 February 1999), also known as Caio Felipe or simply Caio, is a Brazilian professional footballer who currently plays as a right-back for Itabaiana.

== Career ==
Caio began his career in São Paulo's youth sectors, being part of the 2019 Copa SP champion squad. He did not play for the main team, but was loaned to CSA in 2020, where he made 5 appearances.

In November 2022, he was definitively negotiated with Maringá FC, where he competed in Campeonato Paranaense and Série D. In September 2023, he was announced by Joinville to compete in the Copa Santa Catarina. In 2024, Caio was one of Monte Azul's highlights in winning the Copa Paulista title.

Caio Felipe played in the 2025 Campeonato Paulista Série A2 for EC Taubaté, reaching the semi-finals. In June, Caio was announced as a reinforcement for Itabaiana.

== Honours ==
Monte Azul

- Copa Paulista: 2024

São Paulo U20

- Copa São Paulo de Futebol Jr.: 2019
- Copa do Brasil Sub-20: 2018
- Supercopa do Brasil Sub-20: 2018
