= Ynaiã =

Brazilian footballer

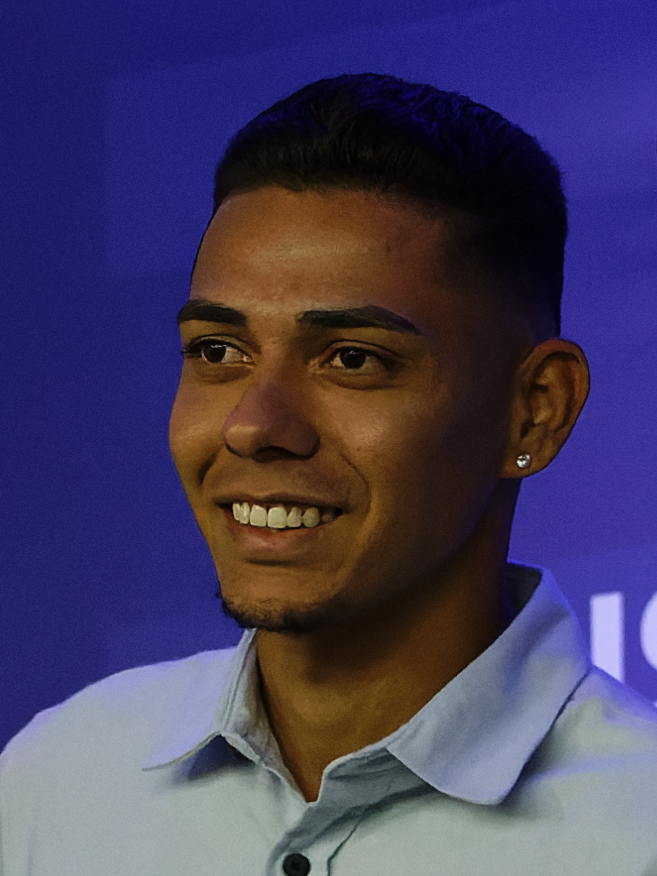
- Ynaiã in 2023

Personal information
- Full name: Ynaiã Kairê Alves Cardoso
- Date of birth: 21 June 1999 (age 27)
- Place of birth: Jales, Brazil
- Height: 1.77 m (5 ft 10 in)
- Position: Right-back

Team information
- Current team: Guarani
- Number: 30

Youth career
- América-SP
- 2014–2016: Santos
- 2017–2018: Coritiba
- 2018–2019: América Mineiro

Senior career*
Years	Team	Apps	(Gls)
2019–2020	América Mineiro	0	(0)
2019–2020	→ Taubaté (loan)	8	(0)
2020	→ Luverdense (loan)	5	(0)
2021	Cianorte	3	(0)
2021	Murici	6	(0)
2021–2022	Velo Clube	8	(0)
2022	Rio Branco-SP	1	(0)
2022	Pérolas Negras	9	(0)
2022	North	6	(0)
2023	Velo Clube	15	(0)
2023–2024	Athletic-MG	58	(0)
2025	Água Santa	8	(0)
2025	→ Volta Redonda (loan)	6	(0)
2025	→ Botafogo-PB (loan)	4	(0)
2026	Velo Clube	7	(0)
2026–	Guarani	13	(1)
- * Club domestic league appearances and goals as of 10 November 2026

Ynaiã Kairê Alves Cardoso (born 21 June 1999), simply known as Ynaiã, is a Brazilian footballer who plays as a right-back for Guarani.

== Career ==
Born in Jales, São Paulo, Ynaiã played for América-SP, Santos, Coritiba and América Mineiro as a youth, before making his senior debut while on loan at Taubaté in 2019. In December 2020, he moved to Luverdense also on loan, before signing a permanent deal with Cianorte on 20 January 2021.

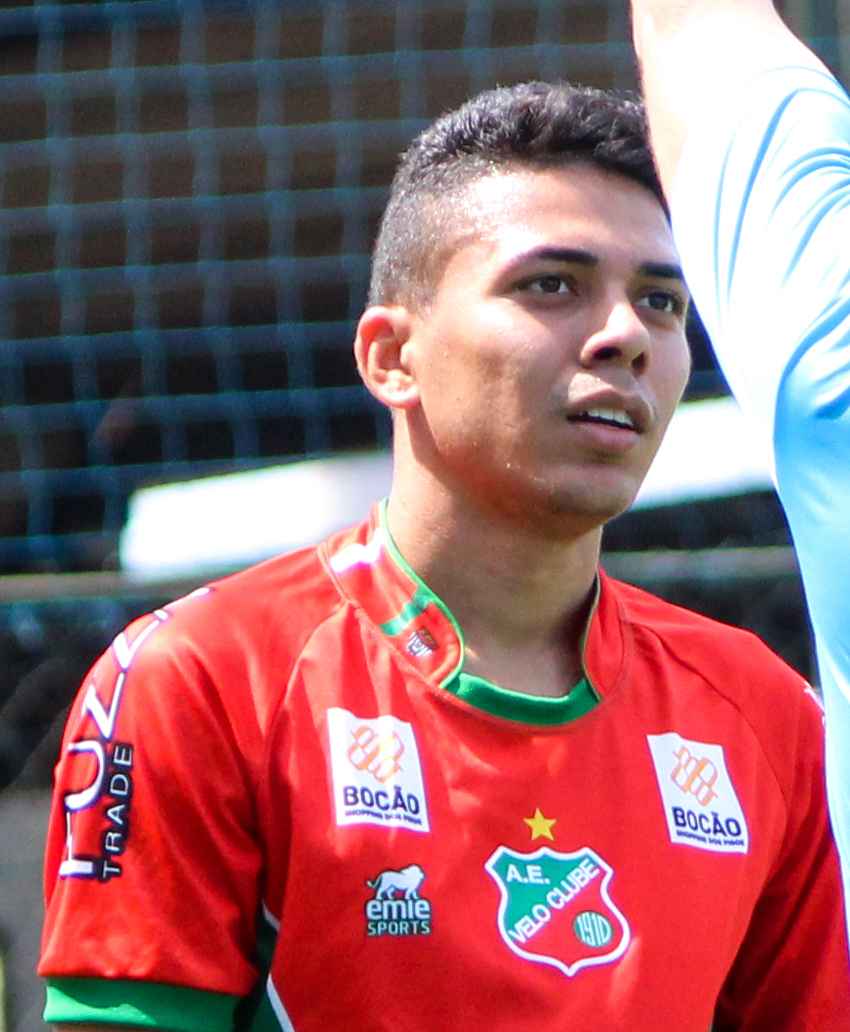
Ynaiã playing for Velo Clube in 2021

Ynaiã subsequently represented Murici, Velo Clube, Rio Branco-SP, Pérolas Negras and North in the following two seasons, before returning to Velo in October 2022. On 26 April 2023, after being chosen the best right-back of the Campeonato Paulista Série A2, he signed for Athletic-MG.

On 17 December 2024, Ynaiã was announced at Água Santa. He then served loan stints at Volta Redonda and Botafogo-PB, before again returning to Velo on 15 December 2025.

== Career statistics ==
As of 20 January 2026

Club	Season	League			State League		Cup		Continental		Other		Total	
Club	Season	Division	Apps	Goals	Apps	Goals	Apps	Goals	Apps	Goals	Apps	Goals	Apps	Goals
Taubaté	2019	Paulista A2	—		—		—		—		13 (Note: Appearance(s) in Copa Paulista)	0	13	0
Taubaté	2020	Paulista A2	—		8	0	—		—		—		8	0
Taubaté	Total		—		8	0	—		—		13	0	21	0
Luverdense	2020	Mato-Grossense	—		5	0	—		—		—		5	0
Cianorte	2021	Série D	—		3	0	0	0	—		—		3	0
Murici	2021	Série D	6	0	—		—		—		—		6	0
Velo Clube	2021	Paulista A2	—		—		—		—		5	0	5	0
Velo Clube	2022	Paulista A2	—		8	0	—		—		—		8	0
Velo Clube	Total		—		8	0	—		—		5	0	13	0
Rio Branco-SP	2022	Paulista 2ª Divisão	—		1	0	—		—		—		1	0
Pérolas Negras	2022	Série D	9	0	—		—		—		—		9	0
North	2022	Mineiro Segunda Divisão	—		6	0	—		—		—		6	0
Velo Clube	2023	Paulista A2	—		15	0	—		—		—		15	0
Athletic-MG	2023	Série D	21	0	—		—		—		—		21	0
Athletic-MG	2024	Série C	26	0	11	0	1	0	—		—		38	0
Athletic-MG	Total		47	0	11	0	1	0	—		—		59	0
Água Santa	2025	Série D	—		8	0	—		—		—		8	0
Volta Redonda	2025	Série B	6	0	—		—		—		—		6	0
Botafogo-PB	2025	Série C	4	0	—		—		—		—		4	0
Velo Clube	2026	Série D	0	0	3	0	—		—		—		3	0
Career total			72	0	68	0	1	0	0	0	18	0	159	0

== Honours ==
North

- Campeonato Mineiro Segunda Divisão: 2022

Individual

- Campeonato Paulista Série A2 Best XI: 2023
