= Associação Esportiva Velo Clube Rioclarense =

Association football club in Brazil

Velo Clube
- Full name: Associação Esportiva Velo Clube Rioclarense
- Nicknames: Rubro Verde; Velão; Galo Vermelho
- Founded: 28 August 1910; 116 years ago
- Ground: Benitão
- Capacity: 8,136
- President: Reginaldo Breda
- Head coach: Guilherme Alves
- League: Campeonato Brasileiro Série D Campeonato Paulista
- 2025: Paulista, 11th of 16
Home colours	Away colours	colours

Associação Esportiva Velo Clube Rioclarense, commonly referred to as Velo Clube, is a Brazilian professional association football club based in Rio Claro, São Paulo. The team competes in the Campeonato Paulista Série A1, the first tier of the São Paulo state football league.

== History ==
The club was founded on 28 August 1910. They won the Campeonato Paulista do Interior in 1925 and the Campeonato Paulista Série A2 in 2024.

== Current squad ==
=== First-team squad ===
As of 11 February 2026

Note: Flags indicate national team as defined under FIFA eligibility rules; some limited exceptions apply. Players may hold more than one non-FIFA nationality.

No.	Pos.	Nation	Player
—	GK	BRA	Léo Steffen
—	GK	BRA	Marcelo Carné
—	GK	BRA	Paulo Vitor
—	GK	BRA	Paulo Oliveira
—	DF	BRA	Betão
—	DF	BRA	Gabriel Mancha
—	DF	BRA	Islan
—	DF	BRA	Lucas Mingoti (on loan from ABECAT)
—	DF	BRA	Marcelo Augusto
—	DF	BRA	Breno Lopes
—	DF	BRA	Caíque
—	DF	BRA	Ruan Souza
—	DF	BRA	Thomas Luciano
—	DF	BRA	Ynaiã

No.	Pos.	Nation	Player
—	DF	BRA	Zé Mário
—	MF	BRA	Adriano Júnior
—	MF	BRA	Karl (on loan from Itabaiana)
—	MF	BRA	Luiz Otávio
—	MF	BRA	Mateus Norton
—	MF	BRA	Matheus Firmino
—	MF	BRA	Rodrigo Oliveira
—	MF	BRA	Sillas
—	FW	BRA	Daniel Amorim
—	FW	BRA	Jhoninha
—	FW	BRA	João Lucas (on loan from Vila Nova)
—	FW	BRA	Lucas Duni
—	FW	BRA	Rodrigo Alves

== Honours ==
- Campeonato Paulista Série A2
  - Winners (1): 2024
- Campeonato Paulista Série A3
  - Winners (1): 2020

== Stadium ==
Associação Esportiva Velo Clube Rioclarense play their home games at Estádio Benito Agnelo Castellano. The stadium has a maximum capacity of 8,198 people.
