= Lucas Rafael =

Brazilian footballer

Personal information
- Full name: Lucas Rafael Gonçalves da Silva
- Date of birth: 25 March 1998 (age 28)
- Place of birth: São Paulo, Brazil
- Height: 1.88 m (6 ft 2 in)
- Position: Centre-back

Team information
- Current team: Itabaiana (loan)

Youth career
- 2017: Artsul
- 2018: CSA

Senior career*
Years	Team	Apps	(Gls)
2019	CSA	0	(0)
2019	→ Flamengo de Arcoverde (loan)	1	(0)
2019	Picos	6	(0)
2020	VOCEM	7	(1)
2021	Amazonas	6	(0)
2021–2022	São Caetano	7	(0)
2022	Boa Esporte	7	(0)
2022–2024	Estrela Amadora	6	(0)
2023	→ Covilhã (loan)	17	(0)
2023	→ Red Bull Bragantino (loan)	3	(0)
2024–2025	Oliveirense	5	(1)
2025–	Guarani	14	(0)
2026–	→ Itabaiana (loan)	16	(1)
- * Club domestic league appearances and goals as of 17 August 2024

Lucas Rafael Gonçalves da Silva (born 25 March 1998), known as Lucas Rafael or Lucão, is a Brazilian footballer who plays as a centre-back for Itabaiana, on loan from Guarani FC.

== Career ==
Born in São Paulo, Lucas Rafael represented Artsul and CSA as a youth, but made his senior debut while on loan at Flamengo de Arcoverde in the 2019 Campeonato Pernambucano. He finished the season winning the Campeonato Piauiense Segunda Divisão with Picos.

In February 2020, Lucas Rafael joined VOCEM for the year's Campeonato Paulista Segunda Divisão. He started the 2021 season at Amazonas, but moved to São Caetano in August of that year.

On 26 April 2022, Lucas Rafael was announced at Boa Esporte. On 20 July, however, he moved abroad after signing for Liga Portugal 2 side Estrela da Amadora.

On 11 January 2023, after being sparingly used at Estrela, Lucas Rafael was loaned to fellow second division side Covilhã for the remainder of the season. On 2 August, he returned to his home country after agreeing to a loan deal with Série A side Red Bull Bragantino until December.

== Career statistics ==
As of 27 September 2023

Appearances and goals by club, season and competition
Club	Season	League			State league		Cup		Continental		Other		Total	
Club	Season	Division	Apps	Goals	Apps	Goals	Apps	Goals	Apps	Goals	Apps	Goals	Apps	Goals
Flamengo de Arcoverde	2019	Pernambucano	—		1	0	—		—		—		1	0
Picos	2019	Piauiense 2ª Divisão	—		6	0	—		—		—		1	0
VOCEM	2020	Paulista 2ª Divisão	—		7	1	—		—		—		7	1
Amazonas	2021	Amazonense	—		6	0	—		—		—		6	0
São Caetano	2021	Paulista	—		0	0	—		—		8 (Note: Appearance(s) in Copa Paulista)	0	8	0
São Caetano	2022	Paulista A2	—		7	0	—		—		—		7	0
São Caetano	Total		—		7	0	—		—		8	0	15	0
Boa Esporte	2022	Mineiro Módulo II	—		7	0	—		—		—		7	0
Estrela Amadora	2022–23	Liga Portugal 2	6	0	—		0	0	—		3 (Note: Appearance(s) in Taça da Liga)	0	9	0
Covilhã	2022–23	Liga Portugal 2	17	0	—		—		—		—		17	0
Red Bull Bragantino	2023	Série A	3	0	—		—		—		—		3	0
Career total			26	0	34	1	0	0	0	0	11	0	71	1

== Honours ==
Picos

- Campeonato Piauiense Segunda Divisão: 2019
