= Gabriel Mancha =

Brazilian footballer

Personal information
- Full name: Gabriel de Jesus Moraes
- Date of birth: 7 September 2002 (age 24)
- Place of birth: Brazil
- Height: 1.93 m (6 ft 4 in)
- Position: Centre-back

Team information
- Current team: Velo Clube

Youth career
- 2019–2020: Rio Claro
- 2021: Taguatinga
- 2022: Riacho City
- 2022: SKA Brasil

Senior career*
| Years | Team | Apps | (Gls) |
| 2023 | União São João | 25 | (1) |
| 2024– | Velo Clube | 13 | (1) |
| 2024 | → União São João (loan) | 0 | (0) |
- * Club domestic league appearances and goals as of 17:50, 26 January 2025 (UTC)

Gabriel de Jesus Moraes (born 7 September 2002), known as Gabriel Mancha or just Mancha, is a Brazilian footballer who plays as a centre-back for Velo Clube.

== Career ==
Mancha represented Rio Claro, Taguatinga, Riacho City and SKA Brasil as a youth. In April 2023, he was announced in the squad of União São João for the year's Campeonato Paulista Segunda Divisão.

On 18 January 2024, after winning the Segundona, Mancha moved to Velo Clube. He featured regularly with the side, winning the 2024 Campeonato Paulista Série A2 and scoring the winner in the first leg of the finals.

On 15 May 2024, Mancha returned to União on loan for the Copa Paulista. In December, he returned to Velo for their 2025 Campeonato Paulista campaign.

== Career statistics ==
As of 26 January 2025

| Club | Season | League | | | State League | | Cup | | Continental | | Other | | Total | |
| Club | Season | Division | Apps | Goals | Apps | Goals | Apps | Goals | Apps | Goals | Apps | Goals | Apps | Goals |
|---|---|---|---|---|---|---|---|---|---|---|---|---|---|---|
| União São João | 2023 | Paulista 2ª Divisão | — | | 25 | 1 | — | | — | | — | | 25 | 1 |
| Velo Clube | 2024 | Paulista A2 | — | | 11 | 1 | — | | — | | — | | 11 | 1 |
| Velo Clube | 2025 | Paulista | — | | 2 | 0 | — | | — | | — | | 2 | 0 |
| Velo Clube | Total | | — | | 13 | 1 | — | | — | | — | | 13 | 1 |
| União São João (loan) | 2024 | Paulista A3 | — | | — | | — | | — | | 14 (Note: Appearance(s) in Copa Paulista) | 1 | 14 | 1 |
| Career total | | | 0 | 0 | 38 | 2 | 0 | 0 | 0 | 0 | 14 | 1 | 52 | 3 |

== Honours ==
União São João

- Campeonato Paulista Segunda Divisão: 2023

Velo Clube

- Campeonato Paulista Série A2: 2024
