= Edel (footballer) =

Brazilian footballer

Personal information
- Full name: Ildefonso Soares de Oliveira
- Date of birth: 17 September 1958 (age 68)
- Place of birth: Santa Cruz de Monte Castelo, Brazil
- Position: Left back

Senior career*
Years	Team	Apps	(Gls)
1978–1979	Londrina		
1980–1981	Marília		
1982–1985	São Paulo	22	(3)
1984	→ Taubaté (loan)		
1984	→ Guarani (loan)		
1985	Caxias		
1986	São Bento		
1986	Sport Recife		
1987	Novorizontino		
1988	São Bento		
1988–1989	Rio Branco-SP		
1990–1991	Grêmio Maringá		
1991	Pelotas		
1991	Arapongas		
- * Club domestic league appearances and goals as of 22 October 2023

Ildefonso Soares de Oliveira (born 17 September 1958), better known as Edel, is a Brazilian former professional footballer who played as a left back.

== Career ==
Left-back, Edel was known for his excellent free-kick ability. He played for several clubs in São Paulo and the south of the country, with emphasis on São Paulo FC, where he was state champion in 1985. He currently lives in Colíder, Mato Grosso.

== Honours ==
São Paulo

- Campeonato Paulista: 1985
