= Pereira (footballer, born 1988) =

Brazilian footballer

Personal information
- Full name: Edson Luiz Martins dos Santos
- Date of birth: 19 August 1988 (age 38)
- Place of birth: São Paulo, Brazil
- Height: 1.83 m (6 ft 0 in)
- Position: Midfielder

Team information
- Current team: Noroeste (interim)

Youth career
- 2008: Vila Nova

Senior career*
Years	Team	Apps	(Gls)
2009–2011	Vila Nova	30	(0)
2009	→ Canedense (loan)	4	(2)
2009–2010	→ Linense (loan)	7	(0)
2010	→ Goianésia (loan)	15	(5)
2011	Fortaleza	5	(0)
2012	Boa Esporte	0	(0)
2012	Aparecidense	8	(0)
2013	Marília	22	(6)
2013	Comercial-SP	0	(0)
2014–2016	Grêmio Novorizontino	49	(18)
2014	→ Juventude (loan)	10	(1)
2015	→ Vitória (loan)	7	(0)
2016	Joinville	18	(1)
2017	Sertãozinho	10	(1)
2017	Santa Cruz	7	(1)
2017	Cuiabá	12	(1)
2017–2018	Portuguesa	12	(2)
2018–2021	Novorizontino	40	(11)
2018–2019	→ Brasil de Pelotas (loan)	24	(1)
2022	Barra-SC	10	(0)
2022–2024	Noroeste	33	(3)
Total		323	(53)

Managerial career
- 2025–: Noroeste (assistant)
- 2025–: Noroeste (interim)
- * Club domestic league appearances and goals

Edson Luiz Martins dos Santos (born 19 August 1988), commonly known as Pereira, is a Brazilian football coach and former player who played as a midfielder. He is the current interim head coach of Noroeste.

Pereira has represented a number of other clubs at Campeonato Brasileiro Série B level, including Vila Nova, Vitória, Joinville and Santa Cruz.
