= André Luis (footballer, born 1997) =

Brazilian footballer

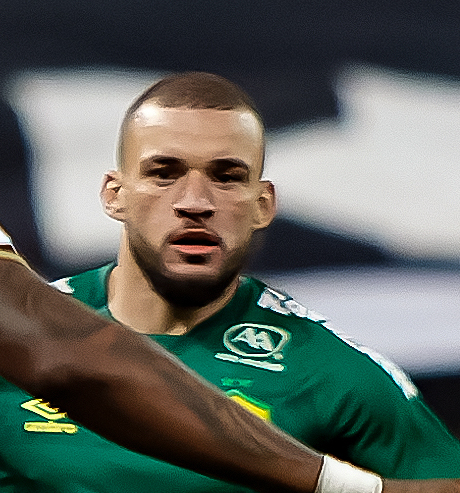
- André Luis with Cuiabá in 2022

Personal information
- Full name: André Luis da Costa Alfredo
- Date of birth: 21 April 1997 (age 29)
- Place of birth: Pouso Alegre, Brazil
- Height: 1.79 m (5 ft 10 in)
- Position: Forward

Team information
- Current team: Vila Nova
- Number: 7

Youth career
- 2007–2012: Santos
- 2012–2014: Portuguesa
- 2014–2016: Atlético Paranaense

Senior career*
Years	Team	Apps	(Gls)
2015–2017	Atlético Paranaense	0	(0)
2015	→ Guaratinguetá (loan)	5	(0)
2016	→ Brasília (loan)	2	(1)
2017	Santa Cruz	55	(5)
2018	Cianorte	10	(3)
2018	→ Ponte Preta (loan)	35	(11)
2019–2020	Corinthians	4	(0)
2019	→ Fortaleza (loan)	24	(2)
2020	→ Daejeon Hana Citizen (loan)	5	(5)
2020	Daejeon Hana Citizen	0	(0)
2020–2021	Shanghai Shenhua	0	(0)
2020	→ Daejeon Hana Citizen (loan)	21	(8)
2021	Corinthians	0	(0)
2021	→ Atlético Goianiense (loan)	38	(2)
2022	Cuiabá	33	(3)
2023	Jeonbuk Hyundai Motors	13	(0)
2024–2025	Cuiabá	36	(2)
2025–	Vila Nova	35	(2)
- * Club domestic league appearances and goals as of 14 April 2026

André Luis da Costa Alfredo (born 21 April 1997), known as André Luis, is a Brazilian professional footballer who plays as a forward for Vila Nova.

== Club career ==
In 2020, André Luis joined Daejeon Hana Citizen FC on loan. In June of that year, both clubs announced the permanent transfer of André Luis to the Korean side, but after failing to pay the transfer fee, he subsequently joined Shanghai Greenland Shenhua and was loaned to Daejeon for the remainder of the season.

In 2021, however, Corinthians announced the return of André Luis after Shenhua also did not pay the transfer fee of the player. On 26 March, he moved to fellow first division side Atlético Goianiense on loan for the remainder of the year.

In 2023, Luis returned to South Korea, joining Jeonbuk Hyundai Motors.

== Honours ==
Corinthians

- Campeonato Paulista: 2019
