= Rio Claro, São Paulo =

Rio Claro
- Municipality
- Municipality of Rio Claro
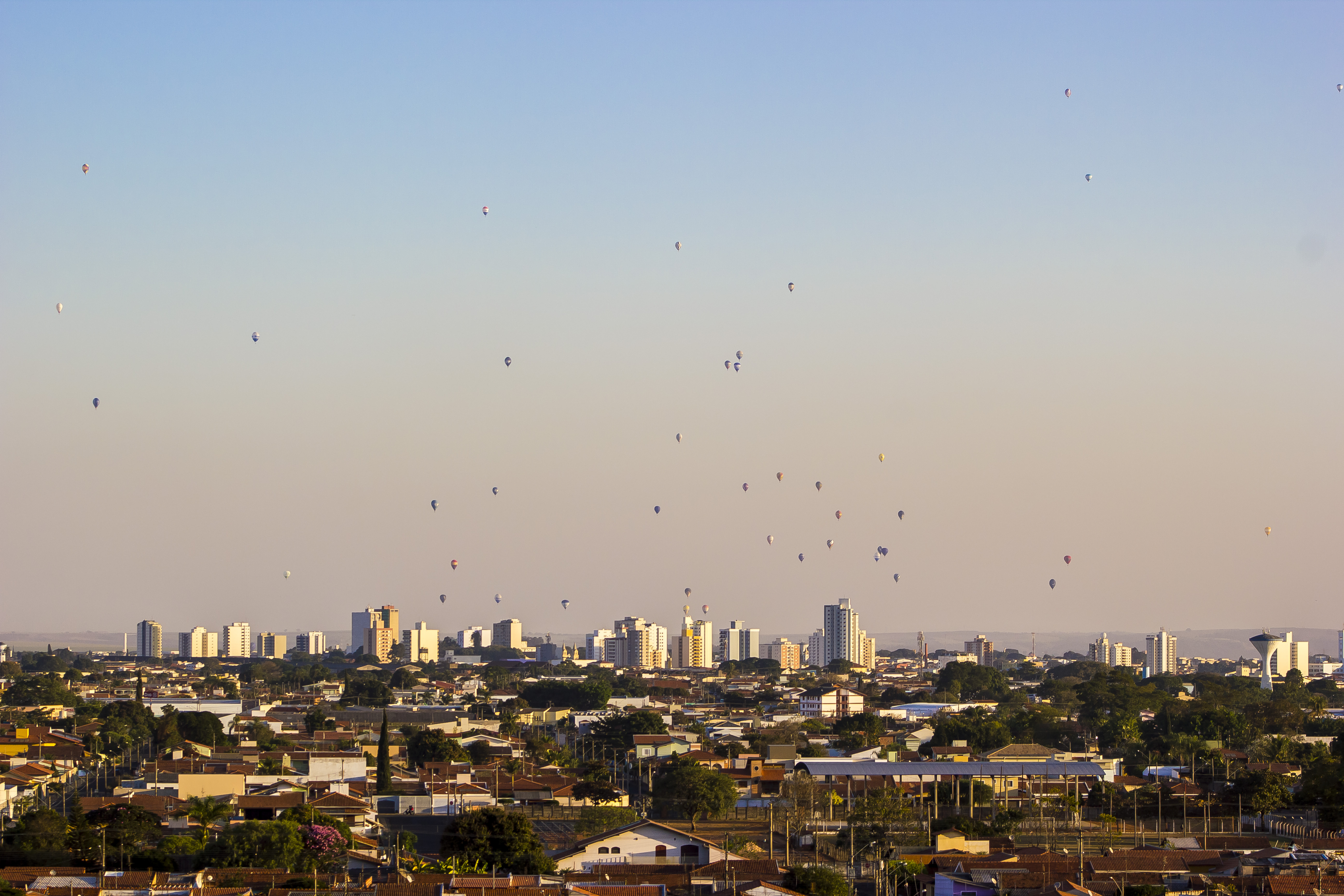

- Flag Coat of arms
- Nickname: Cidade Azul (Blue City)
- Location in the São Paulo state.

- Location within Brazil
- Coordinates: 22°24′39″S 47°33′39″W
- Country: Brazil
- State: São Paulo

Government
  - Mayor: Gustavo Perissinoto (PSD)

Area
  - Total: 498.422 km^{2} (192.442 sq mi)

Population (2022 Brazilian Census)
  - Total: 201,418
  - Estimate (2025): 210,323
  - Density: 37,369/km^{2} (96,790/sq mi)
- HDI (2010): 0.803 – very high

Rio Claro is a city in the state of São Paulo in Brazil. The elevation is 613 m. It was incorporated as the village of São João Batista do Ribeirão Claro in 1827, and this incorporation is celebrated every year on June 24 as a municipal holiday.

The name was changed later to Rio Claro. Starting in the 19th century, Rio Claro attracted large numbers of immigrants from European countries, especially from Germany, Switzerland and Italy, but also from Spain, Portugal, some Eastern European countries, and a substantial community of Christian Arabs from the then Ottoman Empire (mostly Syrian and Lebanese). Japanese immigrants arrived later. There is also a large population of Afro-Brazilians. Rio Claro used to play a very important role in the railway system of São Paulo state.

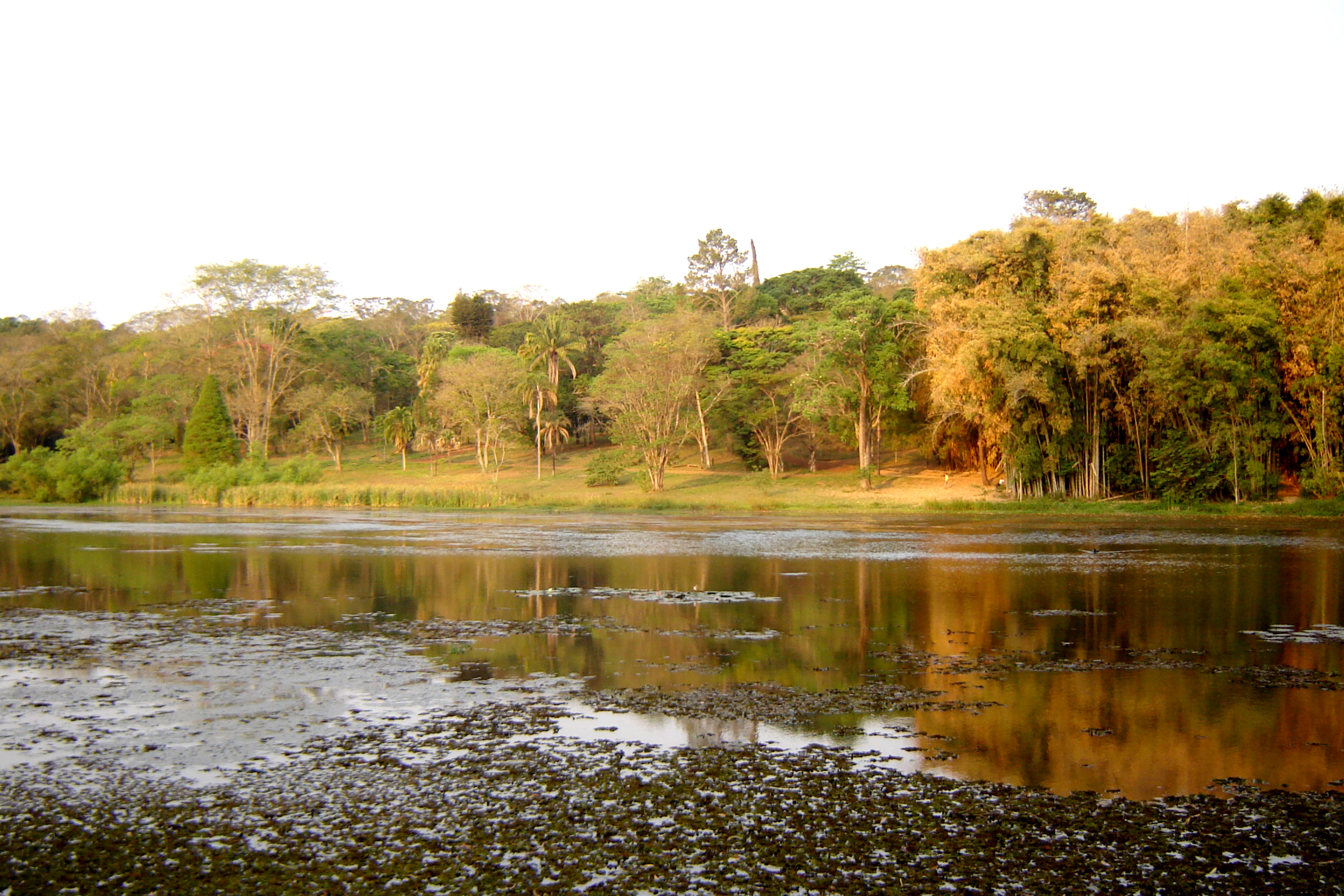
Horto Florestal "Edmundo Navarro de Andrade" en Rio Claro, São Paulo, Brazil

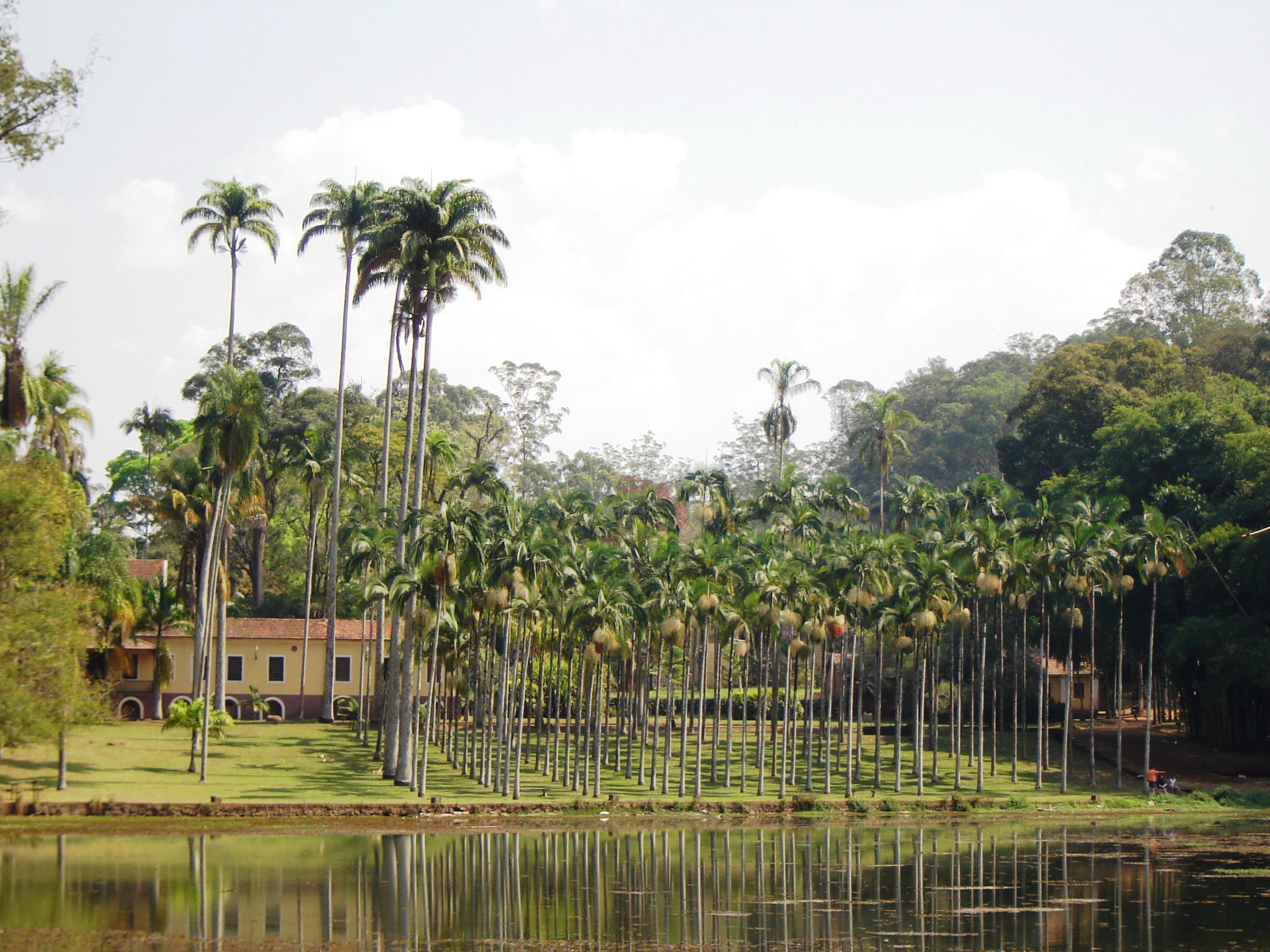
Picture of the forest park of Edmundo Navarro de Andrade.

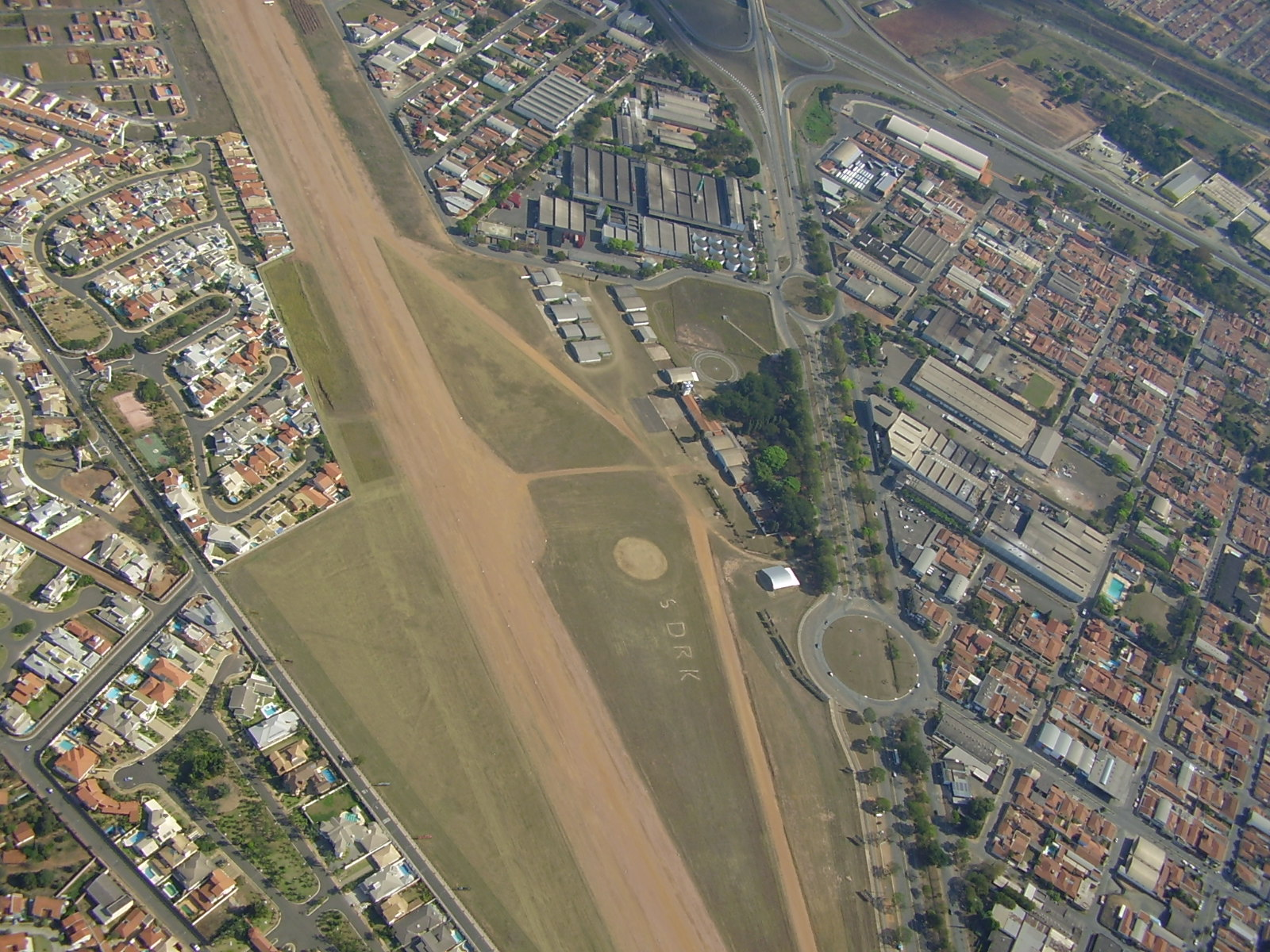
Aerial view of the Aeroclub of Rio Claro.

== Education ==
Rio Claro hosts one public university, UNESP, offering courses in Geology, Geography, Environmental Engineering, Mathematics, Physics, Computer Science, Physical Education, Ecology, Biology and Pedagogy (teacher training).

== History ==
=== Pre-Cabralian history ===
The Rio Claro region was inhabited by humans since at least 11,000 BP. The first inhabitants occupied the regions near the Passa-Cinco, Cabeça and Corumbataí rivers and their tributaries — on river terraces or on elevations. They manufactured stone artifacts for hunting and probably occupied the region intensively.

Around 1,000 BP, the ancient peoples were replaced by the semi-sedentary Tupi-Guarani, whom the Portuguese later found spread out along the coast when they arrived in Brazil at the beginning of the 16th century. In the Rio Claro region, they inhabited areas near the current population centers (towns and cities), coinciding with them in some cases. The Tupi-Guarani of Rio Claro are possibly ethnologically associated with the Guaranis-Kaiowá. It is even possible that they disputed territories in the Rio Claro region with people from other cultures, such as people ethnologically associated with the Jê Meredionais, possibly the Kaingangs.

== Demographics ==
- Budget: R$178,542,000.00 (2005)
- Infant mortality rate: 11.76 deaths/1,000 live births
- Literacy: 94.9% (2000)
- Life expectancy at birth: 71.34 years

== Media ==
In telecommunications, the city was served by Companhia Telefônica Brasileira until 1973, when it began to be served by Telecomunicações de São Paulo. In July 1998, this company was acquired by Telefónica, which adopted the Vivo brand in 2012.

The company is currently an operator of cell phones, fixed lines, internet (fiber optics/4G) and television (satellite and cable).

== Sports ==
The city's two football (soccer) clubs are Rio Claro Futebol Clube, founded in 1909, and Associação Esportiva Velo Clube Rioclarense, founded in 1910.

== Religion ==
Christianity is present in the city as follows:

=== Catholic Church ===
The Catholic church in the municipality is part of the Roman Catholic Diocese of Piracicaba.

=== Protestant Church ===
The most diverse evangelical beliefs are present in the city, mainly Pentecostal, including the Assemblies of God in Brazil (the largest evangelical church in the country), Christian Congregation in Brazil, among others. These denominations are growing more and more throughout Brazil.

== See also ==
- List of municipalities in São Paulo
