= Bugre (footballer) =

Brazilian footballer (born 1959)

Personal information
- Full name: João Carlos Lopes
- Date of birth: 18 March 1959 (age 67)
- Place of birth: Presidente Venceslau, Brazil
- Position: Forward

Senior career*
Years	Team	Apps	(Gls)
1978	Noroeste		
1979–1981	Atlético Goianiense		
1981	Vila Nova		
1981–1982	Comercial-MS		
1982	São Paulo	7	(1)
1982	Vila Nova		
1983	Comercial-MS		
1984–1986	Leones Negros UdeG		
1986–1987	Beira-Mar		
1987–1989	Operário-MS		
1990	União Leiria		
1990	Rio Branco-SP		
1991	Lusitano		
1991–1993	Argus		
- * Club domestic league appearances and goals as of 27 October 2023

João Carlos Lopes (born 18 March 1959), better known as Bugre, is a Brazilian former professional footballer who played as a forward.

== Career ==
Appearing as a revelation at the beginning of the 1980s, Bugre was hired by São Paulo FC in 1982 to replace Serginho Chulapa, who was on the Brazil national team. He was successful in football in the state of Mato Grosso do Sul and Portugal.

== Honours ==
Comercial

- Campeonato Sul-Mato-Grossense: 1982

Operário

- Copa União Módulo Branco: 1987
- Campeonato Sul-Mato-Grossense: 1988, 1989
