= Luis Otávio (footballer, born 2000) =

Brazilian footballer

Personal information
- Full name: Luis Otávio dos Santos Netto
- Date of birth: 1 August 2000 (age 26)
- Place of birth: Cerquilho, Brazil
- Height: 1.85 m (6 ft 1 in)
- Position: Midfielder

Team information
- Current team: Guarani
- Number: 55

Youth career
- 2019–2020: Rio Claro

Senior career*
Years	Team	Apps	(Gls)
2021–2023	Grêmio Prudente	30	(0)
2023	XV de Jaú	16	(0)
2024	Taquaritinga	16	(1)
2025	Sertãozinho	19	(2)
2025	Água Santa	9	(0)
2025–2026	São José-SP	15	(1)
2026	Serra Branca	11	(1)
2026–	Serra Branca	1	(0)
- * Club domestic league appearances and goals as of 27 July 2026

Luis Otávio dos Santos Netto (born 1 August 2000), known as Luis Otávio, is a Brazilian footballer who plays as a midfielder for Guarani.

== Career ==
Luis Otávio was born in Cerquilho, São Paulo, and played for Rio Claro as a youth. On 22 July 2021, he signed for Grêmio Prudente and made his senior debut in the year's Campeonato Paulista 2ª Divisão.

Luis Otávio left Prudente on 5 May 2023, and joined XV de Jaú nine days later. He was announced at Mamoré on 1 September, but the deal later collapsed, and he moved to Taquaritinga on 20 November.

In December 2024, Luis Otávio was included in Sertãozinho's squad for the upcoming season. After winning the 2025 Campeonato Paulista Série A3, he agreed to a deal with Bagé on 11 April of that year, but moved to Água Santa instead eight days later.

On 20 August 2025, São José-SP announced the signing of Luis Otávio.

== Career statistics ==
As of 29 April 2026

Club	Season	League			State League		Cup		Continental		Other		Total	
Club	Season	Division	Apps	Goals	Apps	Goals	Apps	Goals	Apps	Goals	Apps	Goals	Apps	Goals
Grêmio Prudente	2021	Paulista 2ª Divisão	—		6	0	—		—		—		6	0
Grêmio Prudente	2022	Paulista 2ª Divisão	—		17	0	—		—		—		17	0
Grêmio Prudente	2023	Paulista A3	—		7	0	—		—		—		7	0
Grêmio Prudente	Total		—		30	0	—		—		—		30	0
XV de Jaú	2023	Paulista 2ª Divisão	—		16	0	—		—		—		16	0
Taquaritinga	2024	Paulista A4	—		16	1	—		—		9 (Note: Appearance(s) in Copa Paulista)	0	25	1
Sertãozinho	2025	Paulista A3	—		19	2	—		—		—		19	2
Água Santa	2025	Série D	9	0	—		—		—		—		9	0
São José-SP	2025	Paulista A2	—		—		—		—		4	1	4	1
São José-SP	2026	Paulista A2	—		15	1	—		—		—		15	1
São José-SP	Total		—		15	1	—		—		4	1	19	2
Serra Branca	2026	Série D	1	0	—		—		—		—		1	0
Career total			10	0	96	4	0	0	0	0	13	1	119	5

== Honours ==
Sertãozinho

- Campeonato Paulista Série A3: 2025
