= Estádio Etelvino Mendonça =

Football stadium in Itabaiana, Sergipe, Brazil

Etelvino Mendonça
- Mendonção
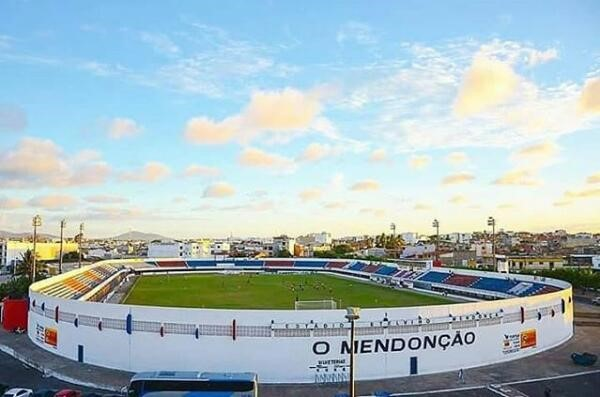
- Sisbrace
- Interactive map of Etelvino Mendonça
- Full name: Estádio Etelvino Mendonça
- Former names: Estádio Presidente Emílio Garrastazu Médici (1971–2016)
- Location: Itabaiana, SE, Brazil
- Coordinates: 10.688526070174099°S 37.43155128467663°W
- Owner: Sergipe state
- Operator: Itabaiana
- Capacity: 10,000
- Surface: Natural grass
- Field size: 105 by 68 metres (114.8 yd × 74.4 yd)

Construction
- Built: 1969–1971
- Opened: 7 March 1971
- Renovated: 1984–1985, 2009–2010

Tenant
- Itabaiana

Estádio Etelvino Mendonça, sometimes known as Mendonção, is a football stadium in Itabaiana, Sergipe, Brazil. It has a maximum capacity of 10,000 people, and hosts the home matches of Associação Olímpica de Itabaiana.

== History ==
Inaugurated on 7 March 1971 under the name of Estádio Presidente Emílio Garrastazu Médici as an honour to then president Emílio Garrastazu Médici, the stadium hosted a match between Itabaiana and Grêmio, which ended 0–0. The stadium's capacity was increased in 1985 and 2010, when new stands were introduced.

In January 2016, Sergipe Governor Jackson Barreto signed a decree to change the name of several buildings in the state, removing its link with the military dictatorship agents. Renamed Estádio Etelvino Mendonça, the stadium was named as an honour to a politician in the city who encouraged sports practice.
