= Raphael Rodrigues (footballer, born 1999) =

Brazilian footballer

Personal information
- Full name: Raphael Rodrigues Borges
- Date of birth: 19 January 1999 (age 27)
- Place of birth: Água Boa, Brazil
- Height: 1.83 m (6 ft 0 in)
- Position: Centre back

Team information
- Current team: Guarani
- Number: 4

Youth career
- 2014: Goiás
- 2015: Brasil Central
- 2016–2019: Luverdense
- 2018–2019: → Cuiabá (loan)

Senior career*
| Years | Team | Apps | (Gls) |
| 2016–2021 | Luverdense | 28 | (0) |
| 2020 | → Barra-SC (loan) | 0 | (0) |
| 2021 | Hercílio Luz | 2 | (0) |
| 2022 | Confiança | 26 | (2) |
| 2022 | → Avaí (loan) | 3 | (0) |
| 2023 | Avaí | 6 | (0) |
| 2023–2024 | Confiança | 22 | (2) |
| 2024 | Botafogo-SP | 11 | (0) |
| 2025– | Guarani | 56 | (5) |
- * Club domestic league appearances and goals as of 26 August 2023

Raphael Rodrigues Borges (born 19 January 1999) is a Brazilian footballer who plays as a central defender for Guarani.

== Club career ==
Born in Água Boa, Mato Grosso, Raphael Rodrigues began his career with Luverdense, making his first team debut in the 2016 Copa FMF. In 2018, he was loaned to Cuiabá and returned to youth football.

Back to Luverdense in 2019, Raphael Rodrigues featured sparingly before moving to Barra-SC on 24 September 2020, on loan. He returned to his parent club ahead of the 2021 season, but left for Hercílio Luz on 18 August of that year.

On 15 December 2021, Raphael Rodrigues agreed to a deal with Comercial-SP, but the move never materialized, and he joined Confiança instead the following 9 January. A regular starter for the latter, he was loaned to Série A side Avaí on 14 August 2022, until December.

Raphael Rodrigues made his top tier debut on 9 October 2022, starting in a 2–0 away loss against Fortaleza.

== Career statistics ==
As of 14 October 2022

| Club | Season | League | | | State League | | Cup | | Continental | | Other | | Total | |
| Club | Season | Division | Apps | Goals | Apps | Goals | Apps | Goals | Apps | Goals | Apps | Goals | Apps | Goals |
|---|---|---|---|---|---|---|---|---|---|---|---|---|---|---|
| Luverdense | 2016 | Série B | 0 | 0 | — | | — | | — | | 4 (Note: Appearance(s) in Copa FMF) | 0 | 4 | 0 |
| Luverdense | 2017 | Série B | 0 | 0 | 0 | 0 | 0 | 0 | — | | 7 (Note: One appearance in Copa Verde, six appearances and one goal in Copa FMF) | 1 | 7 | 1 |
| Luverdense | 2018 | Série C | 0 | 0 | 0 | 0 | 0 | 0 | — | | 0 | 0 | 0 | 0 |
| Luverdense | 2019 | Série C | 6 | 0 | 1 | 0 | 0 | 0 | — | | 13 (Note: Three appearances in Copa Verde, ten appearances in Copa FMF) | 0 | 20 | 0 |
| Luverdense | 2020 | Mato-Grossense | — | | 7 | 0 | 1 | 0 | — | | 0 | 0 | 8 | 0 |
| Luverdense | 2021 | Mato-Grossense | — | | 8 | 0 | 2 | 0 | — | | — | | 10 | 0 |
| Luverdense | Total | | 6 | 0 | 16 | 0 | 3 | 0 | — | | 24 | 1 | 49 | 1 |
| Barra-SC (loan) | 2020 | Catarinense Série B | — | | 0 | 0 | — | | — | | — | | 0 | 0 |
| Hercílio Luz | 2021 | Catarinense | — | | 0 | 0 | — | | — | | 2 (Note: Appearance(s) in Copa Santa Catarina) | 0 | 2 | 0 |
| Confiança | 2022 | Série C | 17 | 1 | 8 | 1 | — | | — | | — | | 25 | 2 |
| Avaí | 2022 | Série A | 1 | 0 | — | | — | | — | | — | | 1 | 0 |
| Career total | | | 24 | 1 | 24 | 1 | 3 | 0 | 0 | 0 | 26 | 1 | 77 | 3 |

== Honours ==
Luverdense

- Copa Verde: 2017
- Copa FMF: 2019
