= Wellington (footballer, born 1993) =

Brazilian footballer

Personal information
- Full name: Wellington Cézar Alves de Lima
- Date of birth: December 21, 1993 (age 32)
- Place of birth: Recife, Brazil
- Height: 1.83 m (6 ft 0 in)
- Position: Defensive midfielder

Team information
- Current team: Botafogo PB

Youth career
- 2010–2013: Santa Cruz

Senior career*
Years	Team	Apps	(Gls)
2011–2017	Santa Cruz	59	(1)
2013	→ Centro Limoeirense (loan)		
2014	→ Belo Jardim (loan)		
2019–	Botafogo PB	0	(0)
- * Club domestic league appearances and goals as of 12:17, 25 April 2019 (UTC)

Wellington Cézar Alves de Lima (born December 21, 1993, in Recife), known as Wellington, is a Brazilian footballer who plays as a midfielder for Botafogo PB.

== Honours ==
Santa Cruz

- Campeonato Pernambucano: 2013, 2015
- Campeonato Brasileiro Série C: 2013
