= Torneio dos Campeões =

Brazilian football competition

Torneio dos Campeões (English: Tournament of the Champions) was an official Brazilian football competition, promoted and organized by CBF in 1982.

A group of 18 Brazilian professional football clubs participated in this tournament, including all the champions and the runners-up of all official national competitions ever played in Brazil up to that year (Campeonato Brasileiro, Torneio Rio-São Paulo, Torneio Roberto Gomes Pedrosa) and America-RJ, 18th ranking in the CBF ranking, and Santa Cruz Futebol Clube, ranked 19th in the same ranking. America-RJ and Santa Cruz replaced Flamengo, who declined the invitation in favor of a world tour.

== Participants ==
- America-RJ
- Atlético Mineiro
- Bahia
- Botafogo
- Corinthians
- Cruzeiro
- Fluminense
- Fortaleza
- Grêmio
- Guarani
- Internacional
- Náutico
- Palmeiras
- Portuguesa
- Santa Cruz
- Santos
- São Paulo
- Vasco da Gama

== The tournament ==
The teams were divided in four groups in the first two rounds, two groups with 5 teams and two groups with four teams in a home-away system. The group champions for each of the two rounds advanced to a quarterfinals bracket.

== Results ==
The following teams advanced to the quarterfinals:

- America-RJ
- Atlético Mineiro
- Bahia
- Fluminense
- Guarani
- Internacional
- Portuguesa
- São Paulo

In the first two rounds America eliminated Atlético Mineiro, Bahia defeated Internacional, Guarani beat São Paulo, and Portuguesa eliminated Fluminense.

In the semifinals, America-RJ eliminated Portuguesa and Guarani defeated Bahia.

In the championship matches, America-RJ tied Guarani at Brinco de Ouro da Princesa Stadium in Campinas, Brazil (with a score of 1-1) and beat Guarani at Maracanã Stadium in Rio de Janeiro, Brazil (with a final score of 2-1, after a 1-1 at regulation and 1-0 in overtime), in a game played under a lot of rain.

== Playoffs ==
Quarter-finals
Atlético Mineiro	0
America-RJ	1
Fluminense-RJ	1
Portuguesa-SP	3
Internacional-RS	2
Bahia-BA	3
São Paulo-SP	0
Guarani-SP	1

Semi-finals
America-RJ	1
Portuguesa-SP	1
Bahia-BA	0
Guarani-SP	1

Final
America-RJ	1-2
Guarani-SP	1-1

== Final ==
July 12, 1982

America-RJ	2 – 1	Guarani
Moreno 13'; Gilson Gênio 25' (OT)		Delém 62'

Maracanã Stadium, Rio de Janeiro (RJ)
Attendance: 11,329 paying
Referee: Carlos Sérgio Rosa Martins
Assistants: Olinto Preussler and Luis Carlos Tybursky
