= Associação Olímpica de Itabaiana =

Brazilian association football club based in Itabaiana, Sergipe, Brazil

Itabaiana
- Full name: Associação Olímpica de Itabaiana
- Nicknames: Tremendão; Tricolor da Serra (Tricolor of the Mountain Range)
- Founded: 10 July 1938; 88 years ago
- Ground: Estádio Etelvino Mendonça
- Capacity: 12,000
- President: Wilson Mendonça
- Head coach: Roberto Cavalo
- League: Campeonato Brasileiro Série C Campeonato Sergipano
- 2025 2025: Série C, 16th of 20; Sergipano, 2nd of 10
- Website: aoitabaiana.com.br
Home colors	Away colors

Associação Olímpica de Itabaiana, commonly referred to as Itabaiana, is a Brazilian professional club based in Itabaiana, Sergipe founded on 10 July 1938. It competes in the Campeonato Brasileiro Série C, the third tier of Brazilian football, as well as in the Campeonato Sergipano, the top flight of the Sergipe state football league.

Itabaiana is the second-best ranked team from Sergipe in CBF's national club ranking, behind Confiança. They are also the best placed team in the state from outside of Greater Aracaju, at 85th overall.

== History ==
Itabaiana were founded on July 10, 1938, after Botafogo Sport Club folded. The club competed in the Série A in 1974, 1979, 1980, 1981 and 1982.

In 2024, Itabaiana have made the semi-finals of the Campeonato Brasileiro Série D, clinching promotion to the Campeonato Brasileiro Série C in 2025.

== Stadium ==
Itabaiana play their home games at Estádio Etelvino Mendonça. The stadium has a maximum capacity of 14,123 people. It was inaugurated on March 5, 1971, in a game against Grêmio.

== Colors ==
- Home: shirt with blue, white and red vertical stripes, blue shorts and blue socks.
- Away: white shirt with horizontal bands in red and blue, white shorts and white socks.

== Honours ==
=== Official tournaments ===
State
Competitions	Titles	Seasons
Campeonato Sergipano	11	1969, 1973, 1978, 1979, 1980, 1981, 1982, 1997, 2005, 2012, 2023
Copa Governo do Estado de Sergipe	3	2006, 2007, 2025
Campeonato Sergipano Série A2	1	2000

=== Others tournaments ===
==== Regional ====
- Torneio do Nordeste (1): 1971*

Secondary award, parts of 1971 Campeonato Brasileiro Série B tournament.

==== State ====
- Taça Cidade de Aracaju (1): 2012
- Taça Estado de Sergipe (1): 2002

=== Runners-up ===
- Torneio Norte-Nordeste (1): 1971
- Campeonato Sergipano (10): 1970, 1971, 1985, 1987, 2002, 2016, 2017, 2018, 2019, 2025
- Copa Governo do Estado de Sergipe (2): 2008, 2014

== Current squad ==
As of 1 September 2026

Note: Flags indicate national team as defined under FIFA eligibility rules; some limited exceptions apply. Players may hold more than one non-FIFA nationality.

No.	Pos.	Nation	Player
—	GK	BRA	Jefferson
—	GK	BRA	Léo Souza
—	GK	BRA	Geaze
—	GK	BRA	William
—	DF	BRA	Ligger
—	DF	BRA	Yann Motta
—	DF	BRA	Lucas Rafael (on loan from Guarani)
—	DF	BRA	Betão
—	DF	BRA	Caio Felipe
—	DF	BRA	Júlio Henrique (on loan from Tombense)
—	DF	BRA	Manoel
—	DF	BRA	Isaque
—	DF	BRA	Gustavo Fagundes
—	DF	BRA	Gustavo Cintra (on loan from Fluminense)
—	DF	BRA	Tito (on loan from Boavista)
—	MF	BRA	Dyego (on loan from Tombense)

No.	Pos.	Nation	Player
—	MF	BRA	Fabrício Moura
—	MF	BRA	Cleiton (on loan from Tombense)
—	MF	BRA	Gustavo Crecci
—	MF	BRA	Ricardo Cerqueira (on loan from Capivariano)
—	MF	BRA	Renatinho
—	MF	BRA	Victor Luis
—	FW	BRA	Everton Kanela
—	FW	BRA	Leilson
—	FW	BRA	Luan Silva
—	FW	BRA	Denílson
—	FW	BRA	Tarcísio
—	FW	CHI	Brandon Mondaca
—	FW	BRA	Elimar
—	FW	BRA	Rodrigo Alves (on loan from Velo Clube)
