= Guarani FC =

Brazilian association football club in São Paulo

Guarani
- Full name: Guarani Futebol Clube
- Nickname: Bugre (Indigenous)
- Founded: April 2, 1911; 115 years ago
- Ground: Brinco de Ouro
- Capacity: 29,130
- President: André Marconatto
- Head coach: Anderson Gomes
- League: Campeonato Brasileiro Série C Campeonato Paulista
- 2025 2025: Série C, 7th of 20; Paulista, 10th of 16
- Website: guaranifc.com.br
Home colors	Away colors

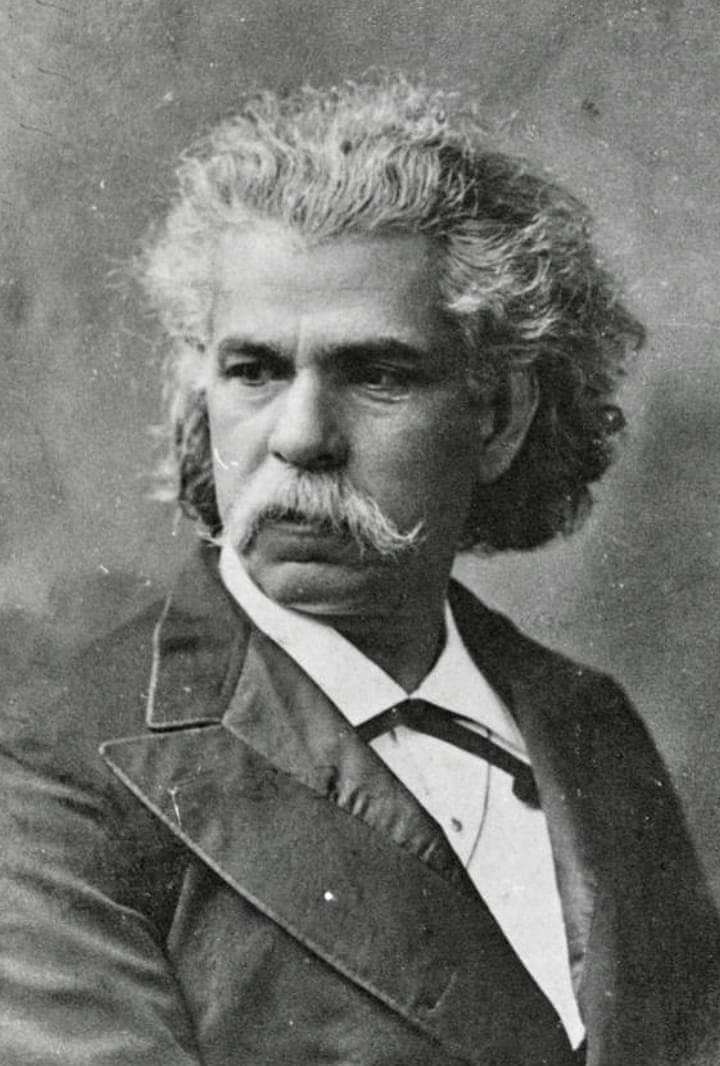
Carlos Gomes

Guarani Futebol Clube, colloquially called Guarani, is a Brazilian association football club in Campinas, São Paulo. Guarani is the only club not based in a state capital or coastal city to have won the top tier of the Brazilian Championship. The team currently play in the Série C, the third tier of Brazilian football, as well as in the Campeonato Paulista Série A1, the top tier of the São Paulo state football league.

It is also known as Bugre, a popular term for an Indigenous Brazilian, and its supporters are known as bugrinos.

== History ==
Guarani Football Club was founded on April 1, 1911, in the city of Campinas, São Paulo, as Guarany Foot-Ball Club, by the initiative of 12 students from the Gymnasio do Estado (now Culto à Ciência). The students, including Pompeo de Vito, Hernani Felippo Matallo and Vicente Matallo, usually played football at Praça Carlos Gomes. Vicente Matallo became Guarani's first president. Guarani was named after maestro Antônio Carlos Gomes' opera "Il Guarany". Antônio Carlos Gomes was born in Campinas, Brazil, and is one of the most distinguished nineteenth century classical composers. Guarani was officially founded on April 1, 1911, but to avoid April Fools' Day jokes by supporters of rival teams, the directors of Guarani changed the official foundation date to April 2, 1911.

In 1949, Guarani won Campeonato Paulista Second tier, earning the right to play in the top tier the following season.

As of 2023, Guarani is one of only two Brazilian clubs not based in a state capital to have won the national championship - the other one being Santos. The club won Campeonato Brasileiro in 1978, after defeating Palmeiras.

In 1979, the club was a semi-finalist in the Copa Libertadores, but was eliminated by the eventual season champions Club Olimpia. This run remains Guarani's best performance in international competitions to date.

In 2016, Guarani qualified for the playoff semifinals of 2016 Campeonato Brasileiro Série C, thus ensuring its return to Serie B after a four-year absence.

== Honours ==
=== Official tournaments ===
National
Competitions	Titles	Seasons
Campeonato Brasileiro Série A	1	1978
Campeonato Brasileiro Série B	1	1981
State
Competitions	Titles	Seasons
Campeonato Paulista Série A2	4	1932, 1944, 1949, 2018

=== Others tournaments ===
==== State ====
- Torneio Início (3): 1953, 1954, 1956

==== City ====
- Campeonato Campineiro (13): 1916, 1919, 1920, 1932, 1938, 1939, 1941, 1942, 1943, 1945, 1946, 1953, 1957
- Taça Cidade de Campinas (2): 1950, 1952
- Torneio Início do Campeonato Campineiro (6): 1936, 1938, 1939, 1942, 1946, 1947

=== Runners-up ===
- Campeonato Brasileiro Série A (2): 1986, 1987
- Campeonato Brasileiro Série B (2): 1991, 2009
- Campeonato Brasileiro Série C (2): 2008, 2016
- Torneio dos Campeões (1): 1982
- Campeonato Paulista (2): 1988, 2012
- Copa Paulista (1): 2004
- Campeonato Paulista Série A2 (1): 2011

=== Youth team ===
- Copa São Paulo de Futebol Júnior (1): 1994

== Titles timeline ==
- 1912 : Runner-up - Liga Operária de Foot-Ball Campineira
- 1916 : Champions - AFC (Associação de Foot-Ball Campineira)
- 1919 : Champions - AFC
- 1920 : Champions - AFC
- 1921 : Runner-up - APEA (Associação Paulista de Esportes Athleticos)
- 1926 : Champions - APEA
- 1928 : Runner-up - APEA
- 1932 : Champions - APEA
- 1938 : Champions - LCF (Liga Campineira de Futebol)
- 1939 : Champions - LCF
- 1941 : Champions - LCF
- 1942 : Champions - LCF
- 1943 : Champions - LCF
- 1943 : Runner-up - Copa do Interior (Amateur) - FPF (Federação Paulista de Futebol)
- 1944 : Champions - Copa do Interior (Amateur) - FPF
- 1944 : Champions - State Amateur Championship - FPF
- 1945 : Champions - LCF
- 1946 : Runner-up - Copa do Interior (Amateur) - FPF
- 1946 : Champions - LCF
- 1949 : Champions - Campeonato Paulista Série A2 - FPF
- 1953 : Champions - Torneio-Início do Campeonato Paulista - FPF
- 1954 : Champions - Torneio-Início do Campeonato Paulista - FPF
- 1956 : Champions - Torneio-Início do Campeonato Paulista - FPF
- 1957 : Runner-up - Torneio-Início do Campeonato Paulista - FPF
- 1969 : Runner-up - Torneio-Início do Campeonato Paulista - FPF
- 1970 : Awarded A Gazeta Esportiva 's "Taça dos Invictos"
- 1970 : Champions - Torneio de Classificação para 1970 (Paulistinha) - FPF
- 1970 : Champions - Torneio de Classificação para 1971 - FPF
- 1974 : Awarded "II Troféu Folha de S.Paulo" (Champions - Countryside 1972/73/74)
- 1976 : Champions - Campeonato Paulista First Stage (Taça Alm. Heleno Nunes)
- 1978 : Champions - Brazilian Championship - CBF
- 1981 : Champions - Taça de Prata - CBF
- 1982 : Runner-up - Torneio dos Campeões - CBF
- 1986 : Runner-up - Brazilian Championship - CBF
- 1987 : Runner-up - Brazilian Championship - CBF
- 1988 : Runner-up - Paulista Championship - FPF
- 1991 : Runner-up - Brazilian Championship Série B - CBF
- 2008 : Runner-up - Brazilian Championship Série C - CBF
- 2009 : Runner-up - Brazilian Championship Série B - CBF
- 2012 : Runner-up - São Paulo State Championship Série A1 - FPF
- 2016 : Runner-up - Brazilian Championship Série C - CBF
- 2018 : Champions - Campeonato Paulista Série A2 - FPF

=== Youth team titles ===
- 1994 : Copa São Paulo de Futebol Júnior
- 1998 : Copa Zico de Futebol Juvenil
- 2001 : Copa Toyota de Futebol Juvenil (disputed in Japan)
- 2002 : Copa Toyota de Futebol Juvenil (disputed in Japan)

== Stadium ==
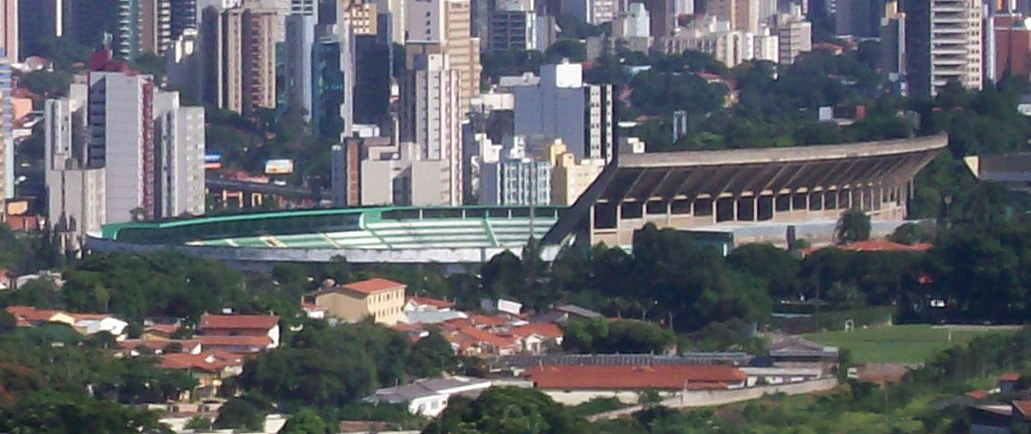
Overview of the Brinco de Ouro stadium.

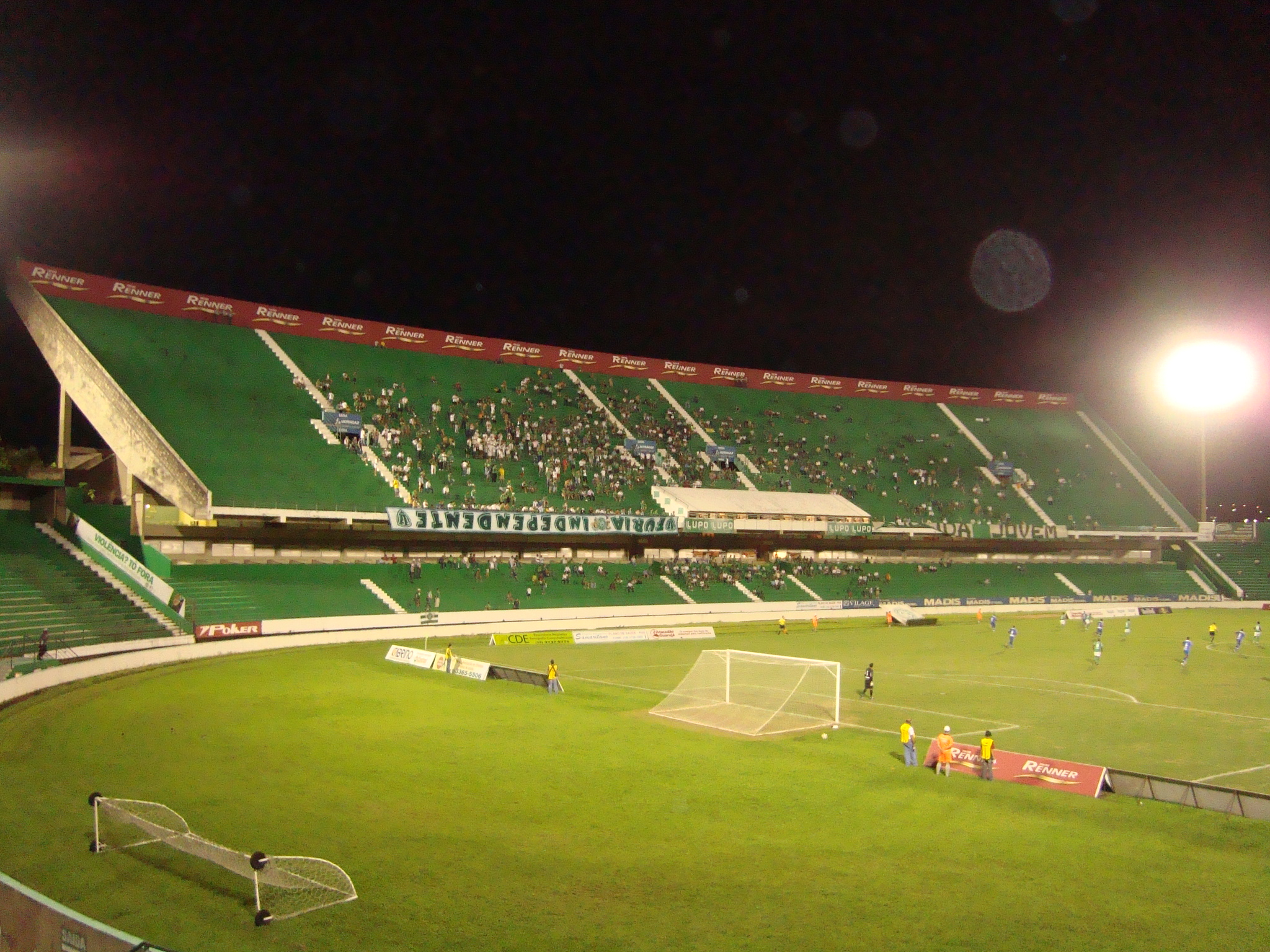
Brinco de Ouro stadium, during a night game.

Guarani's stadium is Estádio Brinco de Ouro da Princesa, built on May 31, 1953, with a maximum capacity of 30,988 people.

== Rival ==
Guarani's biggest rival is Ponte Preta, who also hail from Campinas. The games between Guarani and Ponte Preta are known as Derby Campineiro.

== Performances in the Série A ==
Year	Position	Year	Position	Year	Position	Year	Position	Year	Position	Year	Position
1971	-	1981	-	1991	-	2001	19th	2011	-	2021	-
1972	-	1982	3rd	1992	9th	2002	16th	2012	-	2022	-
1973	15th	1983	16th	1993	6th	2003	13th	2013	-	2023	-
1974	12th	1984	-	1994	3rd	2004	22nd	2014	-	2024	-
1975	12th	1985	15th	1995	19th	2005	-	2015	-		
1976	10th	1986	2nd	1996	6th	2006	-	2016	-		
1977	28th	1987	2nd	1997	21st	2007	-	2017	-		
1978	1st	1988	14th	1998	19th	2008	-	2018	-		
1979	16th	1989	20th	1999	8th	2009	-	2019	-		
1980	16th	1990	-	2000	17th	2010	18th	2020	-		

== Current squad ==
As of 10 September 2026

Note: Flags indicate national team as defined under FIFA eligibility rules; some limited exceptions apply. Players may hold more than one non-FIFA nationality.

No.	Pos.	Nation	Player
—	GK	BRA	Mateus Claus
—	GK	BRA	Andrey Ventura
—	GK	BRA	Fred Conte
—	DF	BRA	Edson Rogério
—	DF	BRA	Maurício Antônio
—	DF	BRA	Rafael Donato (captain)
—	DF	BRA	Raphael Rodrigues
—	DF	BRA	Rian (on loan from Vila Nova)
—	DF	BRA	Yan Henrique
—	DF	BRA	Ynaiã
—	MF	BRA	Carlos Eduardo (on loan from Capivariano)
—	MF	BRA	Igor Pereira

No.	Pos.	Nation	Player
—	MF	BRA	Nathan Melo
—	MF	BRA	Willian Farias
—	MF	ARG	Diego Torres (vice-captain)
—	MF	BRA	Isaque
—	MF	BRA	Kauã Jesus (on loan from São Bernardo)
—	MF	BRA	João Paulo
—	FW	BRA	Kewen
—	FW	BRA	Lucca
—	FW	BRA	Rafael Freitas
—	FW	BRA	Éverton Brito
—	FW	BRA	Matheus Guilherme
—	FW	BRA	Neto Costa (on loan from Capivariano)

=== Youth team ===
Note: Flags indicate national team as defined under FIFA eligibility rules; some limited exceptions apply. Players may hold more than one non-FIFA nationality.

No.	Pos.	Nation	Player
—	DF	BRA	Nickollas
—	DF	BRA	Matheus Póvoa

No.	Pos.	Nation	Player
—	MF	BRA	Kauã Mineiro

=== Out on loan ===
Note: Flags indicate national team as defined under FIFA eligibility rules; some limited exceptions apply. Players may hold more than one non-FIFA nationality.

No.	Pos.	Nation	Player
—	GK	BRA	Caíque França (on loan to Ceará until 30 November 2026)
—	GK	BRA	Dalberson (on loan to Vila Nova until 30 November 2026)
—	DF	BRA	Jonathan Costa (on loan to Vila Nova until 31 December 2026)
—	DF	BRA	Dudu (on loan to Chapecoense until 31 December 2026)
—	DF	BRA	Léo Porfírio (on loan to Santo André until 30 November 2026)
—	DF	BRA	Lucas Rafael (on loan to Itabaiana until 30 November 2026)
—	DF	BRA	Renan Castro (on loan to Paysandu until 30 November 2026)
—	MF	BRA	Luis Otávio (on loan to Joinville until 30 November 2026)

No.	Pos.	Nation	Player
—	MF	BRA	Fabricio Dias (on loan to Inter de Limeira until 30 November 2026)
—	MF	JPN	Ryuta Takahashi (on loan to Frederiquense until 30 November 2026)
—	MF	BRA	Vinicius Yuji (on loan to Frederiquense until 30 November 2026)
—	FW	BRA	João Victor (on loan to Cascavel until 30 November 2026)
—	FW	BRA	Lucas Macedo (on loan to Spartak Pleven until 30 June 2027)
—	FW	BRA	Maranhão (on loan to Ferroviária until 30 November 2026)
—	FW	BRA	Mirandinha (on loan to Jeonnam Dragons until 31 December 2026)
—	FW	BRA	Guilherme Cachoeira (on loan to Londrina until 30 November 2026)

=== First-team staff ===
Position	Name	Nationality
Head coach	Elio Sizenando	Brazilian

== Guarani players in the World Cup ==
The following footballers, who have played for Guarani at some point during their careers, represented Brazil in the FIFA World Cup:

- 1974 FIFA World Cup (West Germany)

Valdir Peres

- 1978 FIFA World Cup (Argentina)

Amaral
Carlos
Jorge Mendonça
Valdir Peres

- 1982 FIFA World Cup (Spain)

Carlos
Paulo Isidoro
Renato
Valdir Peres

- 1986 FIFA World Cup (Mexico)

Careca
Carlos
Edson
Júlio César

- 1990 FIFA World Cup (Italy)

Careca
Ricardo Rocha

- 1994 FIFA World Cup (United States)

Mauro Silva
Ricardo Rocha
Viola
Zetti

- 2002 FIFA World Cup (South Korea/Japan)

Edílson
Luizão

- 2006 FIFA World Cup (Germany)

Mineiro

== Presidents ==
As of 26 August 2022

- Vicente Matallo (1911-12)
- Vicente Matallo - Pompeo de Vito / Mário Branco de Godoy (1913)
- Antonio de Souza Letro / Pompeo de Vito (1914)
- Pompeo de Vito (1915-17)
- Armando Sarnes / Pompeo de Vito (1918)
- Júlio dos Santos Mota / Antonio Alberti / Carmine Alberti (1919)
- Carmine Alberti (1920-21)
- Antonio Albino Júnior (1922-23)
- José de Queiroz Telles (1924)
- Galdino de Moraes Alves / José Ferreira de Godoy (1925)
- Dr. Lucio Pereira Peixoto / Benedicto da Cunha Campos (1926)
- Benedicto da Cunha Campos (1927)
- Wlademir Varanda / Ítalo Franceschini (1928)
- Augusto de Carvalho Asbahr (1929)
- Dr. Romeu Tórtima / Dr. Arnaldo de Campos (1930)
- Alexandre Chiarini (1931)
- Frederico Borghi (1932)
- Dr. Romeu Tórtima (1933)
- Augusto de Carvalho Asbahr (1934)
- João Mezzalira (1935-36)
- Vicente Torregrossa (1937)
- Dr. Januário Pardo Mêo (1938-39)
- Prof. Floriano de Azevedo Marques (1939-40)
- Dr. Sebastião Otranto (1941)
- Jaime Serra / João Mezzalira (1942)
- Alfredo Ribeiro Nogueira (1943)
- Cesar Contessotto (1944)
- Cesar Contessotto / Guilmer Cury Zakia (1945)
- Artemiro Caruzo Andreoli (1946)
- Sebastião Otranto - Emílio Porto (1947)
- Dr. Romeu Tórtima (1948)
- Nilo de Rezende Rubim / Cesar Contessotto (1949)
- Cesar Contessotto / Dr. Romeu Tórtima (1950)
- Isolino Ferramola (1951)
- Dr. Romeu Tórtima (1952)
- Dr. Rui Vicente de Mello / Cesar Contessoto (1953)
- Dolor de Oliveira Barbosa (1954)
- Miguel Moreno (1955)
- Esmeraldino Antunes Barreira (1956)
- Emílio Porto (1957)
- Jaime Silva (1958)
- Mário Brocchi (1959)
- Jaime Silva (1960-62)
- Jamil Gadia (1963)
- Jaime Silva (1964)
- Miguel Moreno (1965)
- Eder Guimarães Leme / João Motta (1966)
- Jaime Silva / Manoel Marques Paiva / Eduardo José Farah (1967)
- Miguel Moreno (1968-69)
- Leonel Almeida Martins de Oliveira (1970), (1977)
- Ricardo Chuffi (1978-79)
- Antonio Tavares Jr. (1980-83)
- Leonel Almeida Martins de Oliveira (1984-87)
- Luiz Roberto Zini (1988-91)
- Luiz Roberto Zini (1992-99)
- José Luiz Lourencetti (1999-06)
- Leonel Almeida Martins de Oliveira (2006-11)
- Marcelo Mingone (2011-2012)
- Alvaro Negrão de Lima (2012-2014)
- Horley Senna (2014-2017)
- Palmeron Mendes Filho (2017-2019)
- Ricardo Miguel Moisés (2019-to-date)

== Records ==
GUARANI´GREATEST SCORERS
Rank	Player's Name	Numbers Of Goals
1º	(Brazil) Zuza	221
2º	(Brazil) Nenê	137
3º	(Brazil) Careca	118
4º	(Brazil) Augusto	104
5º	(Brazil) Zequinha	95
6º	(Brazil) Roberto Caco	93
7º	(Brazil) Fumagalli	89
8º	(Brazil) Jorge Mendonça	88
9º	(Peru) Jesús Villalobos	87
10º	(Brazil) Ambrósio	54

== Ultras ==
- Torcida Fúria Independente
- Guerreiros da Tribo
- Torcida Jovem
- Bugrinos da Capital
