= Campeonato Paulista Série A4 =

Football tournament in Brazil

Campeonato Paulista - Série A4
- Organising body: FPF
- Founded: 1928 (amateur); 1960; 66 years ago (professional)
- Country: Brazil
- State: (São Paulo (state)) São Paulo
- Level on pyramid: 4
- Promotion to: Série A3
- Relegation to: Segunda Divisão
- Domestic cup(s): Copa Paulista; Copa do Brasil
- Current champions: Penapolense (1st title) (2026)
- Most championships: Primavera (3 titles)
- Website: FPF Official website

Campeonato Paulista Série A4 (previous known as Campeonato Paulista Segunda Divisão) is the fourth tier of the professional state football league in the Brazilian state of São Paulo. It is run by the São Paulo State Football Federation (FPF).

== Clubs ==
2026 Série A4

Team	City	Ground	2025 result
Araçatuba	Araçatuba	Adhemar de Barros	3rd
Barretos	Barretos	Fortaleza	13th
Colorado Caieiras	Caieiras	Carlos Ferracini	8th
Comercial	Ribeirão Preto	Palma Travassos	16th (Série A3)
Internacional	Bebedouro	Sócrates Stamatto	9th
Jabaquara	Santos	Espanha	11th
Jacareí	Jacareí	Du Cambusano	6th
Lemense	Leme	Bruno Lazzarini	15th (Série A3)
Nacional	São Paulo (Barra Funda)	Nicolau Alayon	4th
Penapolense	Penápolis	Tenente Carriço	12th
São Caetano	São Caetano do Sul	Anacleto Campanella	7th
São-Carlense	São Carlos	Luisão	14th
Taquaritinga	Taquaritinga	Taquarão	5th
Tanabi	Tanabi	Alberto Victolo	1st (Segunda Divisão)
ECUS	Suzano	Francisco Marques Figueira	2nd (Segunda Divisão)
VOCEM	Assis	Tonicão	10th

Notes

- XV de Jaú, 3rd place in 2024 edition, was promoted due to the withdrawal of Red Bull Bragantino II in Série A3.
- SKA Brasil, 4th place in 2024 edition, withdrew from the dispute due to not having a stadium capable of hosting the club's matches.
- AE Araçatuba and Inter de Bebedouro, 3rd and 4th in the 2024 Segunda Divisão, were also promoted to 2025 Série A4 due to the withdrawals mentioned above.

== List of champions ==
There are all the championship editions, officially recognized by Federação Paulista de Futebol.

Year	Edition	Federation	Champion	City	Runners-up	City
1928	1	APEA	Ordem e Progresso	São Paulo	Oriente	São Paulo
1929	2	APEA	Luzitano FC	São Paulo	Republicano Paulista	São Paulo
1930	3	APEA	São Geraldo	São Paulo	Parque da Mooca	São Paulo
1931	4	APEA	União Vasco da Gama	São Paulo	Castellões	São Paulo
1960	5	FPF	AA Votuporanguense	Votuporanga	Cerâmica	São Caetano do Sul
1961	6	FPF	GREC	Mirassol	Usina Santa Bárbara	Santa Bárbara d'Oeste
1962	7	FPF	Usina Santa Bárbara	Santa Bárbara d'Oeste	Promeca	Várzea Paulista
1963	8	FPF	Bandeirante	Birigui	Monte Alegre	São Caetano do Sul
1964	9	FPF	São José	São José dos Campos	Bancária	Fernandópolis
1965	10	FPF	Andradina	Andradina	Transauto	São Caetano do Sul
1966	11	FPF	Ferroviário	Araçatuba	Palmital	Palmital
1967	12	FPF	Minister Clube	São Paulo	Municipal	Paraguaçu Paulista
1968	13	FPF	Sãomanoelense	São Manuel	Castilho	Castilho
1969	14	FPF	Itapirense	Itapira	União Valinhense	Valinhos
1977	15	FPF	Primavera	Indaiatuba	Beira Rio	Presidente Epitácio
1978	16	FPF	EC Lemense	Leme	SE Ilha Solteira	Ilha Solteira
1979	17	FPF	Fernandópolis	Fernandópolis	Jaboticabal	Jaboticabal
1988	18	FPF	Central Brasileira	Cotia	Iracemapolense	Iracemápolis
1989	19	FPF	Jaboticabal	Jaboticabal	Guapira	São Paulo
1990	20	FPF	Corintians	Presidente Venceslau	Palmeiras	Franca
1991	21	FPF	José Bonifácio	José Bonifácio	Piraju	Piraju
1994	22	FPF (B1-A)	Fernandópolis	Fernandópolis	Inter de Bebedouro	Bebedouro
1994	22	FPF (B1-B)	Monte Azul	Monte Azul Paulista	AD Guarulhos	Guarulhos
1995	23	FPF (B1-A)	Matonense	Matão	Inter de Bebedouro	Bebedouro
1995	23	FPF (B1-B)	Primavera	Indaiatuba	Garça	Garça
1996	24	FPF	Jaboticabal	Jaboticabal	Mauaense	Mauá
1997	25	FPF	Taquaritinga	Taquaritinga	XV de Caraguatatuba	Caraguatatuba
1998	26	FPF	Oeste	Itápolis	Barretos	Barretos
1999	27	FPF	Independente	Limeira	Marília	Marília
2000	28	FPF	Flamengo	Guarulhos	Taquaritinga	Taquaritinga
2001	29	FPF	ECO	Osasco	Sertãozinho	Sertãozinho
2002	30	FPF	Rio Claro	Rio Claro	Guaratinguetá	Guaratinguetá
2003	31	FPF	Mauaense	Mauá	Primavera	Indaiatuba
2004	32	FPF	Monte Azul	Monte Azul Paulista	Ferroviária	Araraquara
2005	33	FPF	São Carlos	São Carlos	Osvaldo Cruz	Osvaldo Cruz
2006	34	FPF	União Mogi	Mogi das Cruzes	Catanduvense	Catanduva
2007	35	FPF	Oeste Paulista	Presidente Prudente	Itapirense	Itapira
2008	36	FPF	Pão de Açúcar	São Paulo	Batatais	Batatais
2009	37	FPF	Red Bull Brasil	Campinas	Atlético Araçatuba	Araçatuba
2010	38	FPF	Taboão da Serra	Taboão da Serra	Velo Clube	Rio Claro
2011	39	FPF	Independente	Limeira	Capivariano	Capivari
2012	40	FPF	CA Votuporanguense	Votuporanga	São Vicente	São Vicente
2013	41	FPF	Matonense	Matão	Água Santa	Diadema
2014	42	FPF	Nacional	São Paulo	Atibaia	Atibaia
2015	43	FPF	São Carlos	São Carlos	Fernandópolis	Fernandópolis
2016	44	FPF	Portuguesa Santista	Santos	Desportivo Brasil	Porto Feliz
2017	45	FPF	Manthiqueira	Guaratinguetá	EC São Bernardo	São Bernardo do Campo
2018	46	FPF	Primavera	Indaiatuba	Comercial	Ribeirão Preto
2019	47	FPF	Paulista	Jundiaí	Marília	Marília
2020	48	FPF	São José	São José dos Campos	Bandeirante	Birigui
2021	49	FPF	União Suzano	Suzano	Matonense	Matão
2022	50	FPF	Grêmio Prudente	Presidente Prudente	Itapirense	Itapira
2023	51	FPF	União São João	Araras	Catanduva FC	Catanduva
2024	52	FPF	Rio Branco	Americana	Francana	Franca
2025	53	FPF	União Barbarense	Santa Bárbara d'Oeste	Paulista	Jundiaí
2026	54	FPF	Penapolense	Penápolis	Inter de Bebedouro	Bebedouro

Federations

Amateur Era (1928-1931)

- APEA - Associação Paulista de Esportes Atléticos

Professional Era (1960-)

- FPF - Federação Paulista de Futebol

League names

- Campeonato Paulista Terceira Divisão (1960–69)
- Campeonato Paulista Segunda Divisão (1977–79)
- Campeonato Paulista Terceira Divisão (1988–90)
- Campeonato Paulista – Torneio Seletivo (1991)
- Campeonato Paulista Série B1 (1994–2004)
- Campeonato Paulista Segunda Divisão (2004–23)
- Campeonato Paulista Série A4 (2024–)

== Titles by club ==
Títles	Club	City
3	Primavera	Indaiatuba
2	Fernandópolis	Fernandópolis
2	Grêmio Prudente	Presidente Prudente
2	Independente	Limeira
2	Jaboticabal	Jaboticabal
2	Matonense	Matão
2	Monte Azul	Monte Azul Paulista
2	São Carlos	São Carlos
2	São José	São José dos Campos
1	Andradina	Andradina
1	Bandeirante	Birigui
1	Central Brasileira	Cotia
1	Corintians	Presidente Venceslau
1	ECO	Osasco
1	Ferroviário	Araçatuba
1	Flamengo	Guarulhos
1	GREC	Mirassol
1	Grêmio Audax	Osasco
1	Itapirense	Itapira
1	José Bonifácio	José Bonifácio
1	EC Lemense	Leme
1	Luzitano	São Paulo
1	Manthiqueira	Guaratinguetá
1	Mauaense	Mauá
1	Minister Clube	São Paulo
1	Nacional	São Paulo
1	Oeste	Itápolis
1	Ordem e Progresso	São Paulo
1	Paulista	Jundiaí
1	Penapolense	Penápolis
1	Portuguesa Santista	Santos
1	Red Bull Brasil	Campinas
1	Rio Branco	Americana
1	Rio Claro	Rio Claro
1	São Geraldo	São Paulo
1	Sãomanoelense	São Manuel
1	Taboão da Serra	Taboão da Serra
1	Taquaritinga	Taquaritinga
1	União Barbarense	Santa Bárbara d'Oeste
1	União Mogi	Mogi das Cruzes
1	União São João	Araras
1	União Suzano	Suzano
1	União Vasco da Gama	São Paulo
1	Usina Santa Bárbara	Santa Bárbara d'Oeste
1	AA Votuporanguense	Votuporanga
1	CA Votuporanguense	Votuporanga

Names change

- Pão de Açúcar EC is the currently Grêmio Audax.
- Oeste Paulista EC is the currently Grêmio Prudente.

Cities change

- Oeste FC has moved from Itápolis to Barueri.
- Grêmio Audax has moved from São Paulo to Osasco.
- Red Bull Brasil has moved from Campinas to Bragança Paulista, due to the partnership between Red Bull and CA Bragantino (Red Bull Bragantino). Red Bull Brasil became the B team.

=== Titles by city ===
City	Championships	Clubs
São Paulo	7	Luzitano (1), Minister Clube (1), Nacional (1), Ordem e Progresso (1), Pão de Açúcar (1), São Geraldo (1), União Vasco da Gama (1)
Indaiatuba	3	Primavera (3)
Fernandópolis	2	Fernandópolis (2)
Jaboticabal	2	Jaboticabal (2)
Limeira	2	Independente (2)
Matão	2	Matonense (2)
Monte Azul Paulista	2	Monte Azul (2)
Presidente Prudente	2	Grêmio Prudente (2)
Santa Bárbara d'Oeste	2	Usina Santa Bárbara (1), União Barbarense (1)
São Carlos	2	São Carlos (2)
São José dos Campos	2	São José (2)
Votuporanga	2	AA Votuporanguense (1), CA Votuporanguense (1)
Americana	1	Rio Branco (1)
Andradina	1	Andradina (1)
Araçatuba	1	Ferroviário (1)
Araras	1	União São João (1)
Birigui	1	Bandeirante (1)
Campinas	1	Red Bull Brasil (1)
Cotia	1	Central Brasileira (1)
Guaratinguetá	1	Manthiqueira (1)
Guarulhos	1	Flamengo (1)
Itapira	1	Itapirense (1)
Itápolis	1	Oeste (1)
José Bonifácio	1	José Bonifácio (1)
Jundiaí	1	Paulista (1)
Leme	1	EC Lemense (1)
Mauá	1	Mauaense (1)
Mirassol	1	GREC (1)
Mogi das Cruzes	1	União Mogi (1)
Osasco	1	ECO (1)
Penápolis	1	Penapolense (1)
Presidente Venceslau	1	Corintians (1)
Rio Claro	1	Rio Claro (1)
Santos	1	Portuguesa Santista (1)
São Manuel	1	Sãomanoelense (1)
Suzano	1	União Suzano (1)
Taboão da Serra	1	Taboão da Serra (1)
Taquaritinga	1	Taquaritinga (1)

== Top scorers ==
Season	Top scorer	Club	Goals
Segunda Divisão
2007	Tarabai	Oeste Paulista	22
2008	Thiago	Atibaia	19
2009	Jackson Borges	Atlético Araçatuba	22
2010	Jaílton	Paulínia	20
2011	Romão	Capivariano	27
2012	Romarinho	CA Votuporanguense	18
2013	Sócrates	União Suzano	17
2014	Sócrates	Nacional	16
2015	Hygor	Noroeste	22
2016	Willian Anicete	Portuguesa Santista	19
2017	Felipe Pereira	EC São Bernardo	14
2018	Gleyson	Comercial	18
2019	Murilo	Fernandópolis	15
2020	Breno	São José	9
2020	Pequeno	Itararé	9
2020	Wendel Rosas	Manthiqueira	9
2021	Daniel Bahia	União Suzano	8
2022	Jeh	Itapirense	12
2023	Marcus Vinícius	Ska Brasil	14
Série A4
2024	Gustavo Brandão	Rio Branco	9
2025	Fábio Azevedo	São Caetano	13
2026	Kadu Barone	Inter de Bebedouro	8
2026	Luan Carioca	Penapolense	8

== See also ==
- Campeonato Paulista
- Campeonato Paulista Série A2
- Campeonato Paulista Série A3
- Campeonato Paulista Segunda Divisão
- Campeonato Paulista Série B3
- Federação Paulista de Futebol
