= Vilson Tadei =

Brazilian footballer

Personal information
- Date of birth: 2 June 1954 (age 72)
- Place of birth: Urupês, Brazil
- Height: 1.72 m (5 ft 8 in)
- Position: Midfielder

Senior career*
Years	Team	Apps	(Gls)
1971–1973	Rio Preto		
1973–1974	América-SP		
1975	Penapolense		
1976–1977	Rio Preto		
1977–1978	Barretos		
1978–1980	São Paulo	57	(2)
1980	Coritiba		
1980–1982	Grêmio	84	(8)
1982	Santa Cruz		
1982–1983	Guarani		
1983–1984	Vasco da Gama		
1984	Internacional		
1984–1986	Monterrey		
1986	Coritiba		
1987	Botafogo-SP		
1988	Figueirense		
1989	Taquaritinga		
1989	Rio Preto		
1990	Jaboticabal		
1991	Jalesense		

Managerial career
- 1991: Rio Preto
- 1992: Sertãozinho
- 1992: José Bonifácio
- 1992: Rio Preto
- 1992: Jalesense
- 1993: Rio Preto
- 1994: Jaboticabal
- 1995–1996: Inter de Bebedouro
- 1996: Londrina
- 1996: Operário Ferroviário
- 1996: Monte Azul
- 1996: Operário-MS
- 1997: Monte Azul
- 1998: Jaboticabal
- 1998–1999: Santo André
- 1999: São Bento
- 2000: Marília
- 2000: URT
- 2001: Olímpia
- 2002: Barretos
- 2002: Sertãozinho
- 2003: Rio Preto
- 2004: Jaboticabal
- 2004: Barretos
- 2004–2005: Monte Azul
- 2005: Rio Preto
- 2005–2006: Grêmio Barueri
- 2006: Guaratinguetá
- 2006–2007: Trindade
- 2007–2008: Linense
- 2007–2008: Rio Preto
- 2009–2010: Linense
- 2011: Guarani
- 2011: Linense
- 2011: América-SP
- 2012: Guarani
- 2012: Guaratinguetá
- 2012: América-SP
- 2013: Ferroviária
- 2013: Nacional-AM
- 2014: Santo André
- 2014: São Caetano
- 2014: Ferroviária
- 2015: URT
- 2015: Santo André
- 2016: Barretos
- 2016–2017: Oeste
- 2017: Linense
- 2018: Anapolina
- 2018: Olímpia
- 2019: Gama
- 2019: Anápolis
- 2020: Gama
- 2020–2021: Brasiliense
- 2021: Anapolina
- 2022: Capital-DF
- 2022: Olímpia
- 2022: Anapolina
- 2023: Gama
- 2023: VOCEM
- 2024: Samambaia
- 2024: Brasiliense
- 2024: VOCEM
- 2025: Barretos
- * Club domestic league appearances and goals

Vilson Tadei (born 2 June 1956) is a Brazilian football coach and former player who played as a midfielder.

== Career ==
Vilson Tadei began his professional career at Rio Preto EC in 1971. In 1973 he was part of the squad that won the "Torneio Seletivo", a competition that allocated places for new teams participating in the 1974 Campeonato Paulista. He also had spells for América de Rio Preto, Penapolense and Barretos, when in 1978 gained the interest of São Paulo FC, team where he made 54 appearances. With refined football, he moved to Grêmio FBPA in 1980, being part of the Gaucho and Brazilian champion squads of 1980 and 1981, playing 84 matches and scoring 8 goals.

In 1983 he started playing for CR Vasco da Gama, and at the club, even without winning titles, he achieved an interesting feat. He scored the first goal in history at the Estádio da Ressacada, from Avaí FC, 15 November 1983, in a Vasco's great 6–1 victory.

He had a quick spell at Internacional and went to Mexican football with Monterrey, where he became champion. Upon returning to Brazil, he played for Botafogo de Ribeirão Preto, Figueirense, Taquaritinga, Jaboticabal, where he won the equivalent of the current Paulita Série A3 in 1990, and ended his playing career at CA Jalesense in 1991.

== Managerial career ==
=== Early years ===
Tadei began his career as a manager immediately after retiring as a player in 1991, again at Rio Preto EC. During the 90s he managed to do little and only coached less prominent teams, especially in football in São Paulo. In 2003, a faker using his name managed to coach some teams in Mato Grosso do Sul and was then hired by Mixto. The fake Vilson Tadei stayed at the Cuiabá club for around 1 month, when the scam finally came to light.

=== First successful spells ===
Tadei's first job that resulted in a title was with Monte Azul in 2004, in the former Série B1. In 2006, he was the coach of Guaratinguetá access to the Campeonato Paulista for the first time, and in 2010, he was champion of the Paulista Série A2 with Linense. In 2012, after successive good spells, he caught the attention of Guarani FC, and commanded a team in the national Série B for the first time. Tadei would also have notable spells at Santo André, São Caetano and URT, a club he had already led in the Copa João Havelange.

In March 2015, he received a good financial offer from Santo André and returned to football in São Paulo. He also had spells at Barretos and Oeste in 2016, when he was given the task of avoiding the team's relegation to Série C, feat achieved by finishing in 16th place. In the 2017 Campeonato Paulista, however, he was unable to resist a last-minute draw against Capivariano and ended up being fired in February. In the second half of 2017, he returned to Linense once again, to compete in the Copa Paulista. In the second half of 2017, he returned to Linense once again, to compete in the Copa Paulista, finishing in the quarterfinals.

=== Federal District and Center-West ===
After serving as coach of Trindade AC in 2006, Vilson Tadei returned to football in Goiás in 2018, at Anapolina, finishing the championship in the semi-finals. After the end of the state championship in Goiás, he agreed with Olimpia to compete in the Copa Paulista, again finishing in the top 8. As the club had no calendar in the second half of the year, it signed a contract with Anápolis, which was in the second division in Goiás. He was runner-up with the team, winning promotion, and returned to Gama in 2020, once again becoming Brasilia champion.

In 2019 Vilson Tadei arrived at Gama, and there he finally achieved his first division title, winning the Campeonato Brasiliense that year. As the club had no calendar in the second half of the year, it signed a contract with Anápolis, which was in the second division in Goiás. He was runner-up with the team, winning promotion, and returned to Gama in 2020, once again becoming Brasilia champion.

On 7 August 2020, Tadei left Gama directly for rival Brasiliense FC, where he would go on to win the 2020 Copa Verde, held in early 2021 due to COVID-19 delays. He also won the Campeonato Brasiliense once again, becoming three consecutive champions. A year later, after Brasiliense failed to have a good campaign in the 2021 Campeonato Brasileiro Série D, he ended up being fired.

For 2022, the modest Capital CF bet on the three-time champion coach from Campeonato Brasiliense dispute. However, Tadei was unable to do a great job and after seven matches without any victories, he left command of the team. A few days later he returned to Olímpia FC, to compete in 2022 Série A3. The club, which faced serious squad building problems, ended up relegated. He still had two more spells in the region, at Anapolina in the second half of 2022, which was looking to return to the first division and Goiás, and at Gama in 2023, but without being able to repeat his previous achievements.

=== VOCEM ===
On 7 August 2023 he was hired by VOCEM, which competed in the Campeonato Paulista Segunda Divisão and for one of the places in access to Série A3. However, 20 days after his arrival, Tadei was unable to prevent the elimination of VOCEM from the competition, which, on the other hand, won a place in the unprecedented Série A4 in 2024.

On 2024 season Tadei coached Samambaia, Brasiliense and VOCEM. On 2025, he assumed the head coach of Barretos once again in Série A4.

== Personal life ==
His son, Mayco Tadei, currently works as his first assistant on his most recent spells.

== Honours ==
=== Player ===
Rio Preto

- Torneio Seletivo: 1973

São Paulo

- Campeonato Paulista: 1980

Grêmio

- Campeonato Gaúcho: 1980
- Campeonato Brasileiro: 1981

Internacional

- Campeonato Gaúcho: 1984

Monterrey

- Mexican Primera División: 1985–86

Jaboticabal

- Campeonato Paulista Série A3: 1990

=== Manager ===
Monte Azul

- Campeonato Paulista Série A4: 2004

Linense

- Campeonato Paulista Série A2: 2010

Gama

- Campeonato Brasiliense: 2019, 2020

Brasiliense

- Copa Verde: 2020
- Campeonato Brasiliense: 2021
