= List of football stadiums in Brazil =

The following is a list of football stadiums in Brazil, ordered by capacity. Current stadiums with a capacity of 5,000 or more are included.

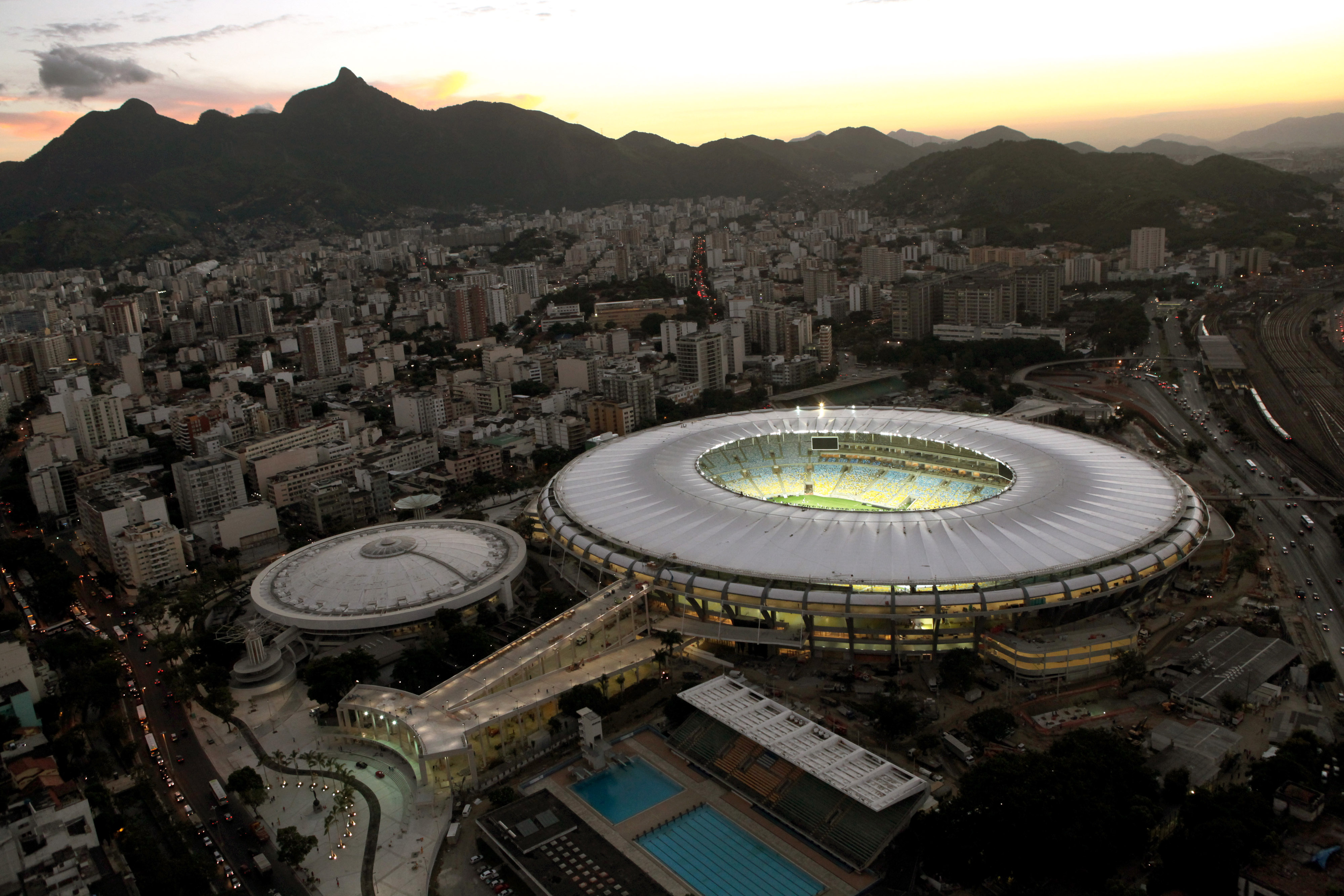
Maracanã Stadium, the largest stadium in Brazilian football.

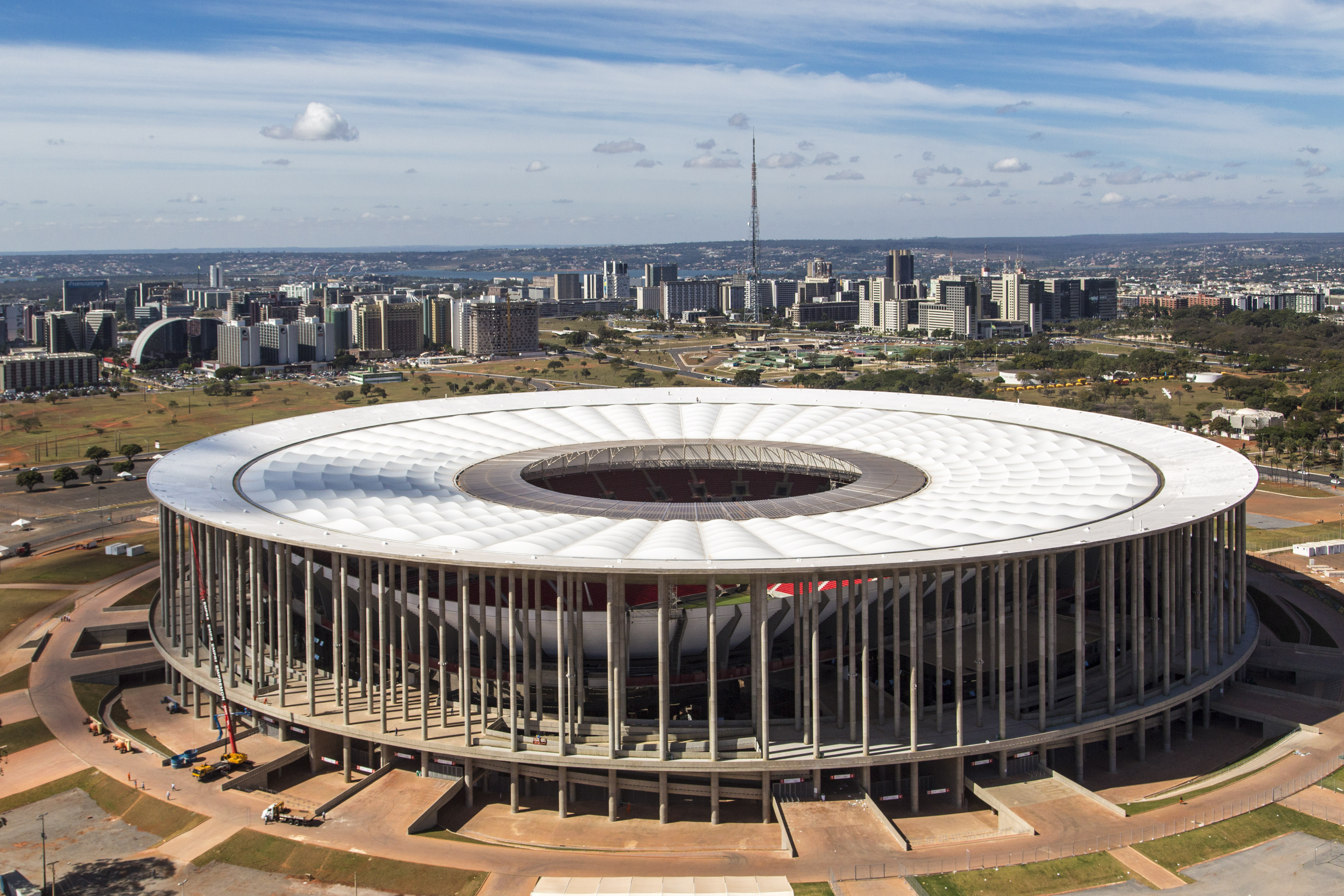
Estádio Nacional Mané Garrincha, the largest stadium in the Central-West Region.

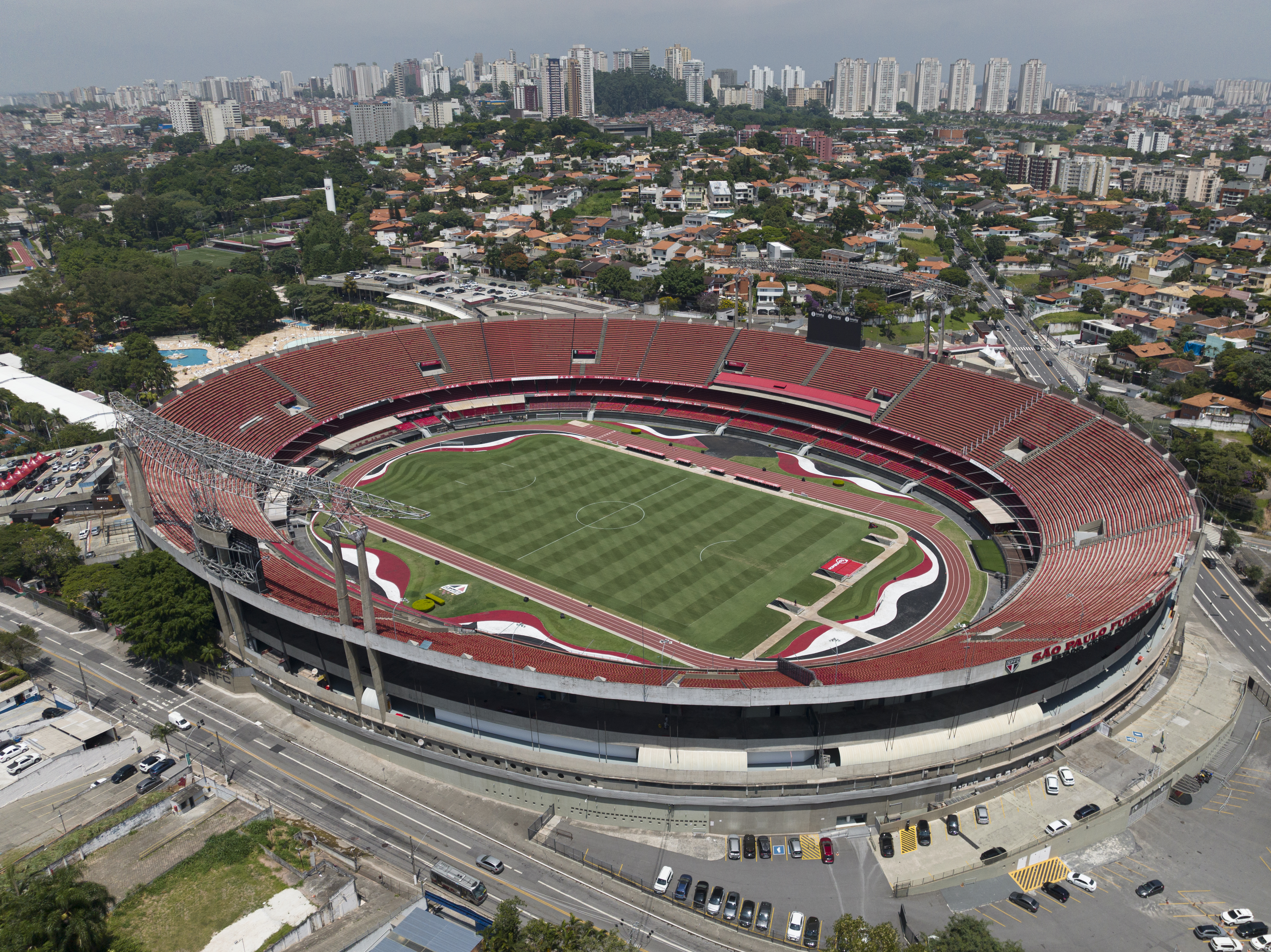
Estádio do Morumbi, the largest privately-owned stadium in Brazilian football.

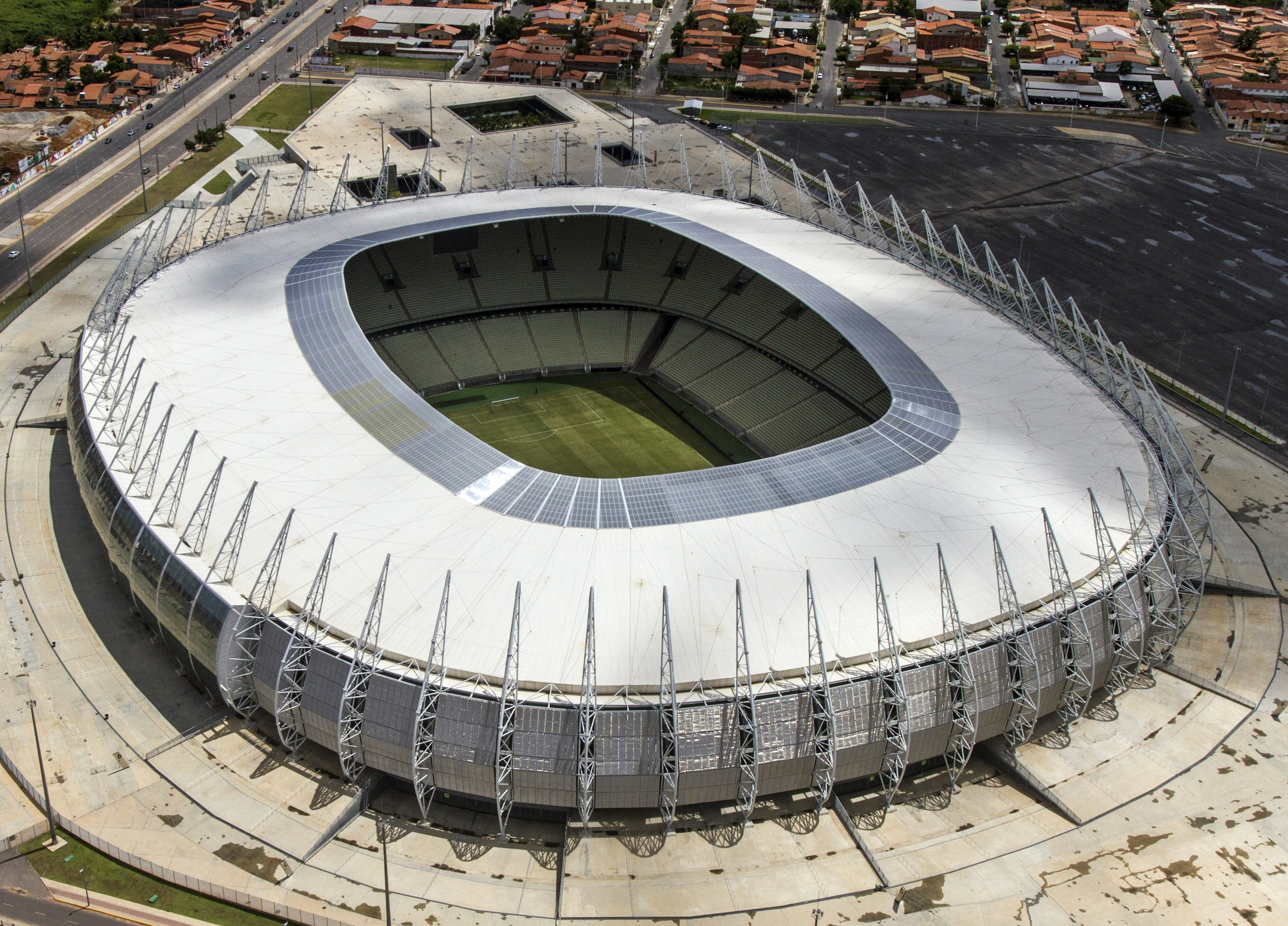
Arena Castelão, the largest stadium in Northeastern Brazil.

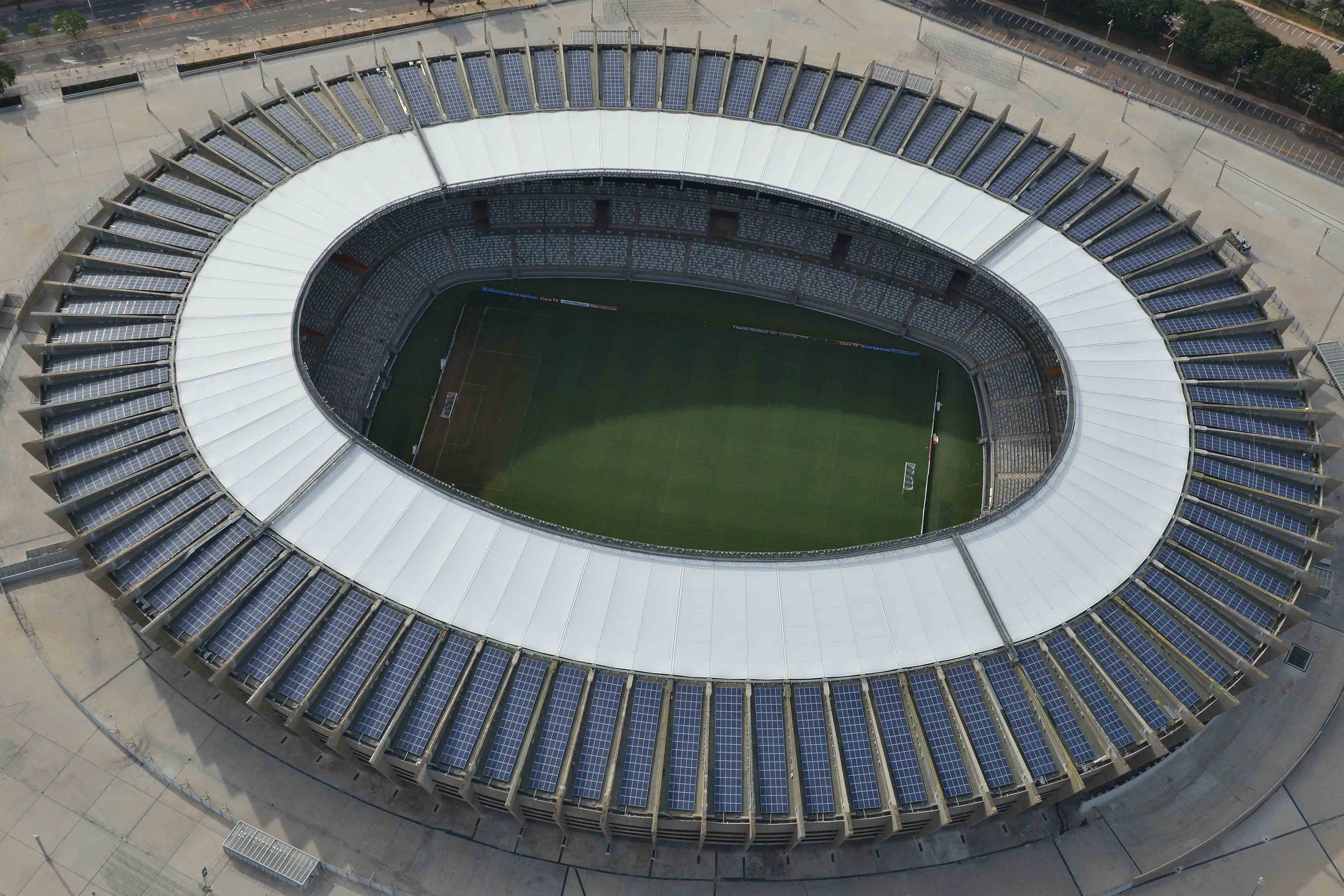
Mineirão, the fifth-largest stadium in Brazilian football.

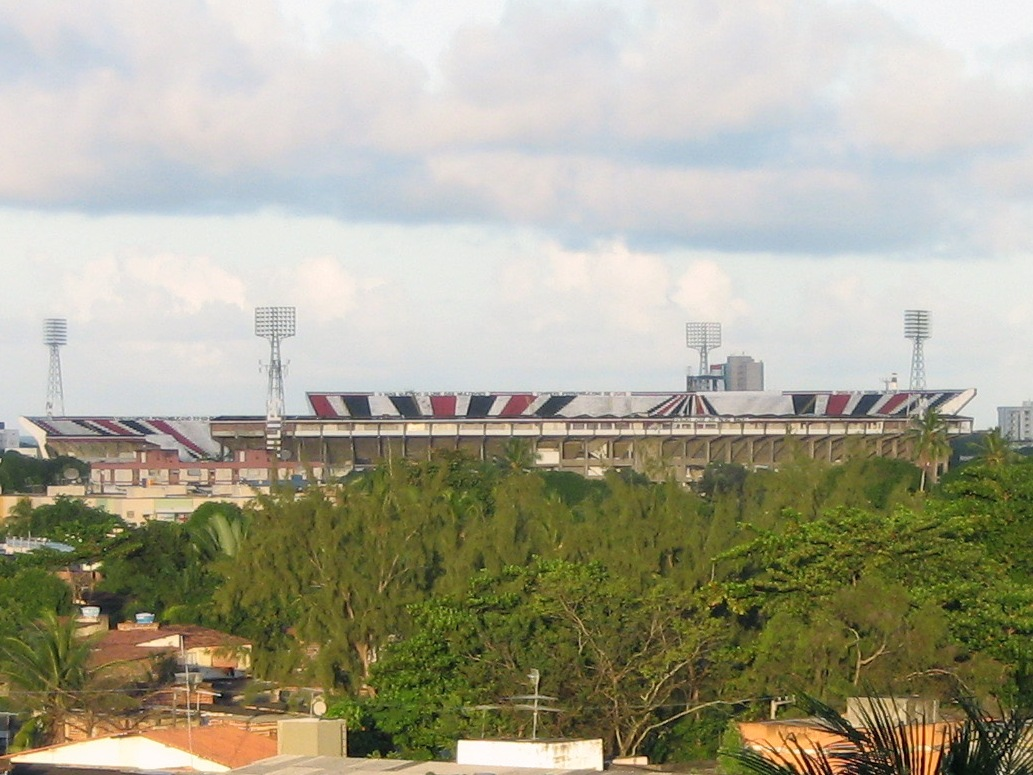
Estádio do Arruda, the largest privately-owned stadium in Northeastern Brazil.

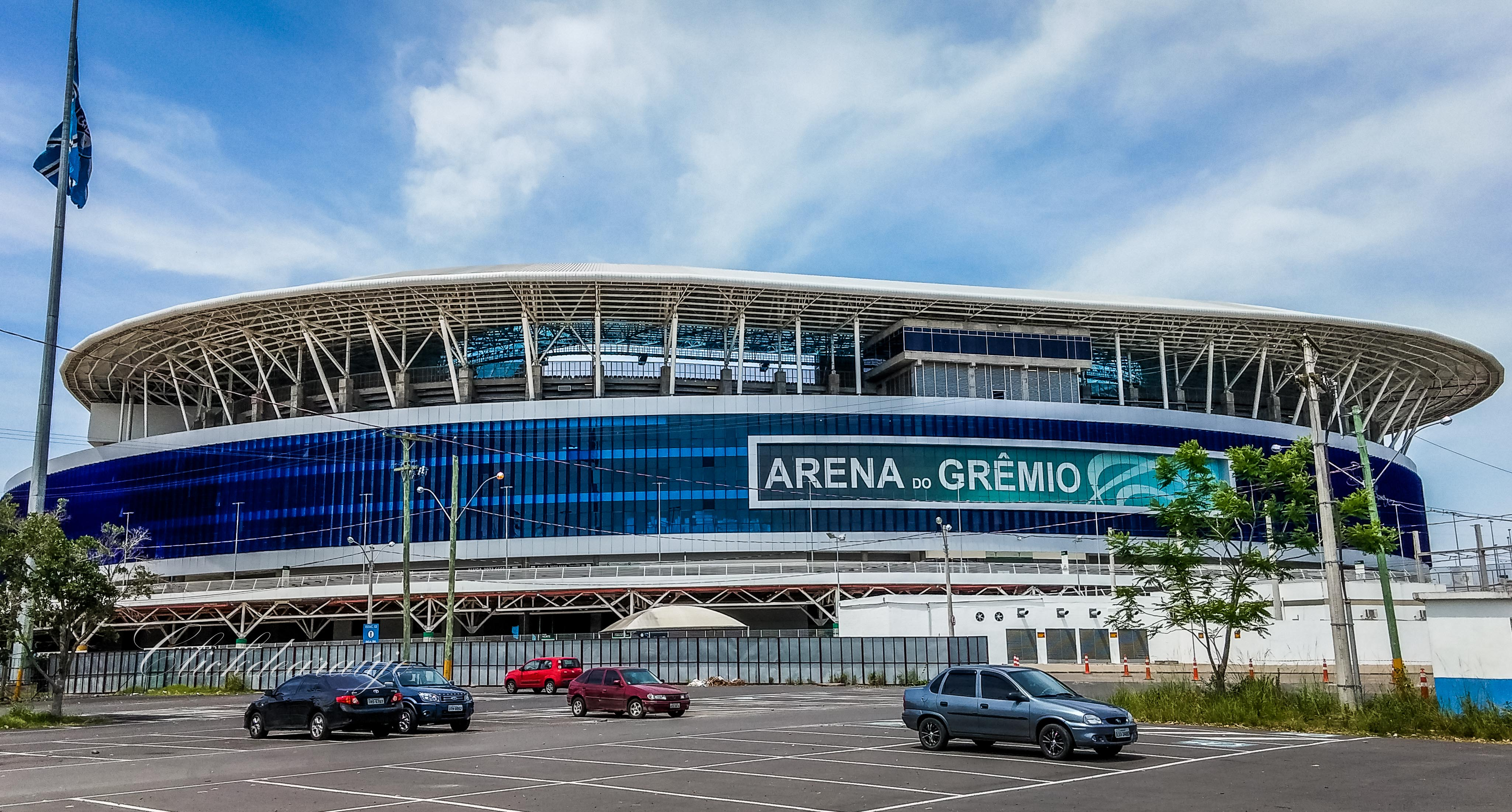
Arena do Grêmio, the largest stadium in Southern Brazil.

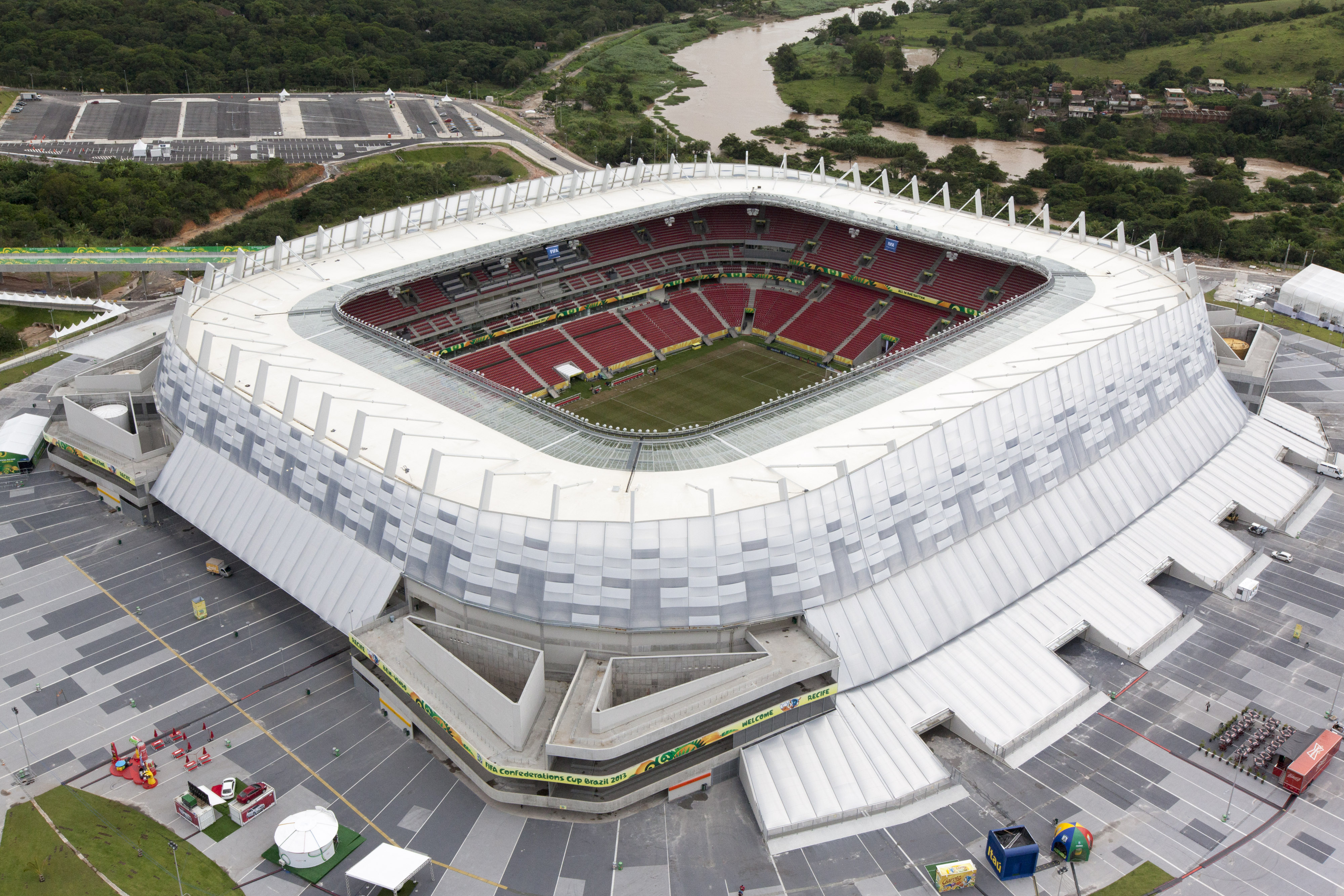
Arena Pernambuco, the largest state-owned stadium in Pernambuco.

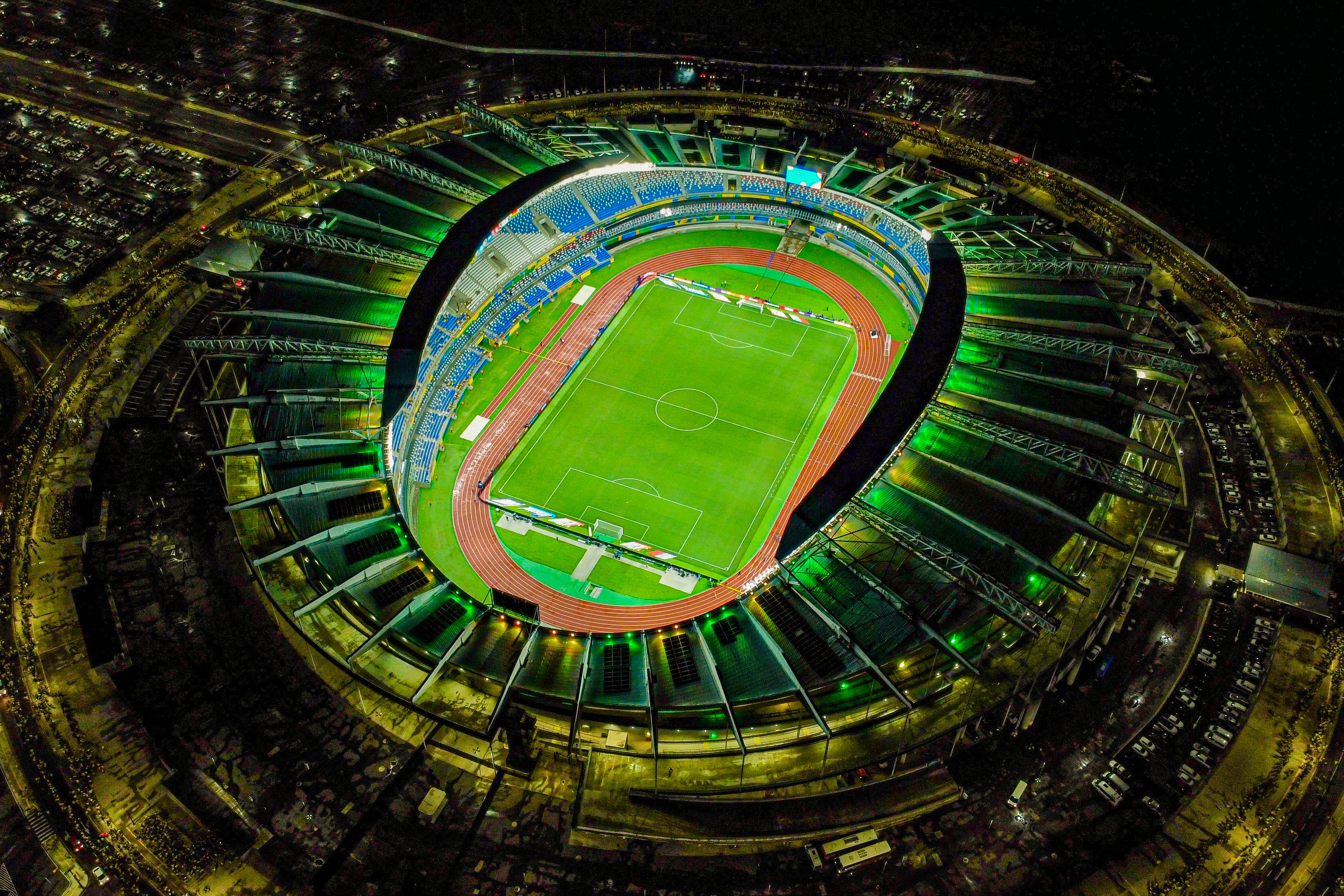
Mangueirão, the largest stadium in Northern Brazil.

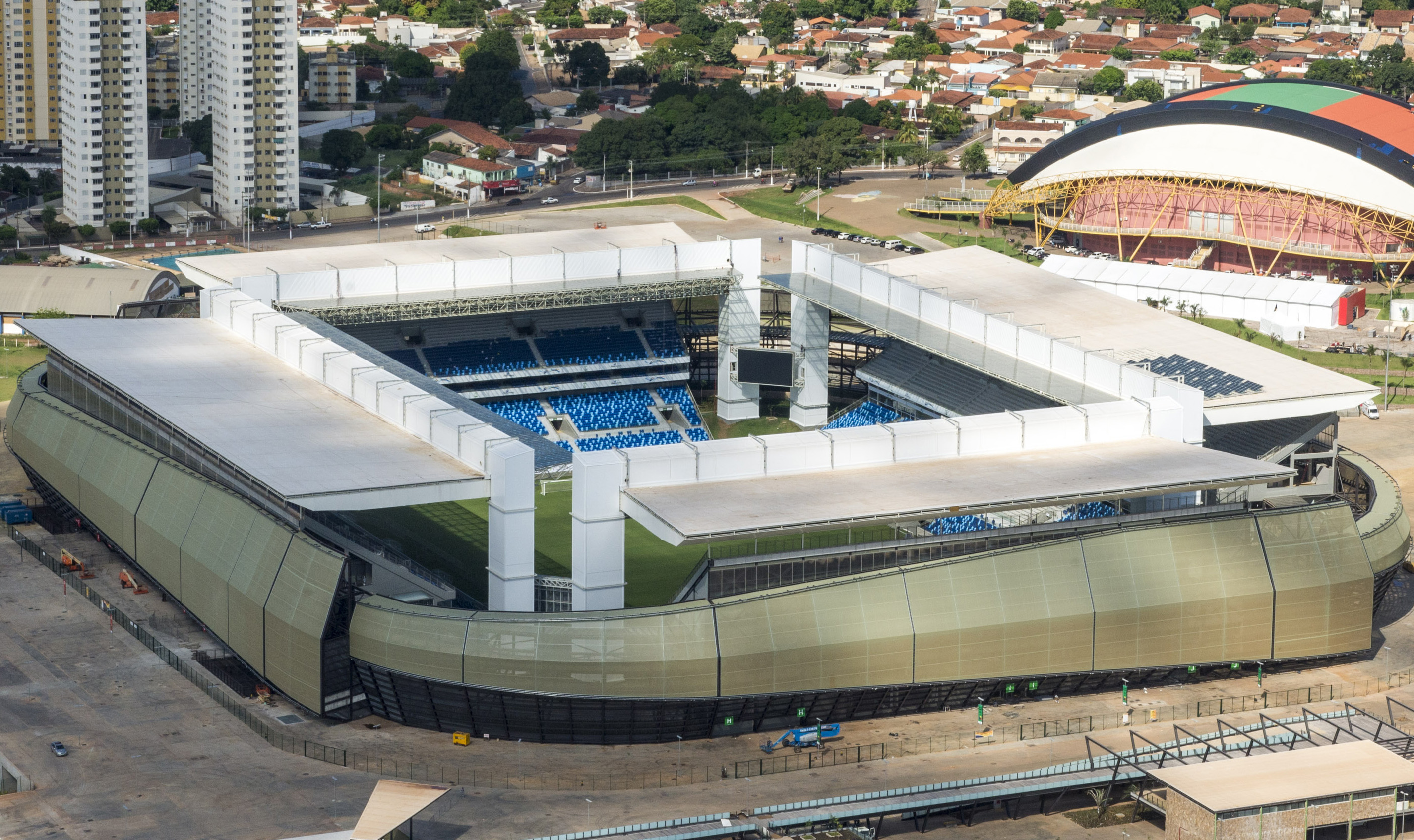
Arena Pantanal, the largest stadium in Mato Grosso.

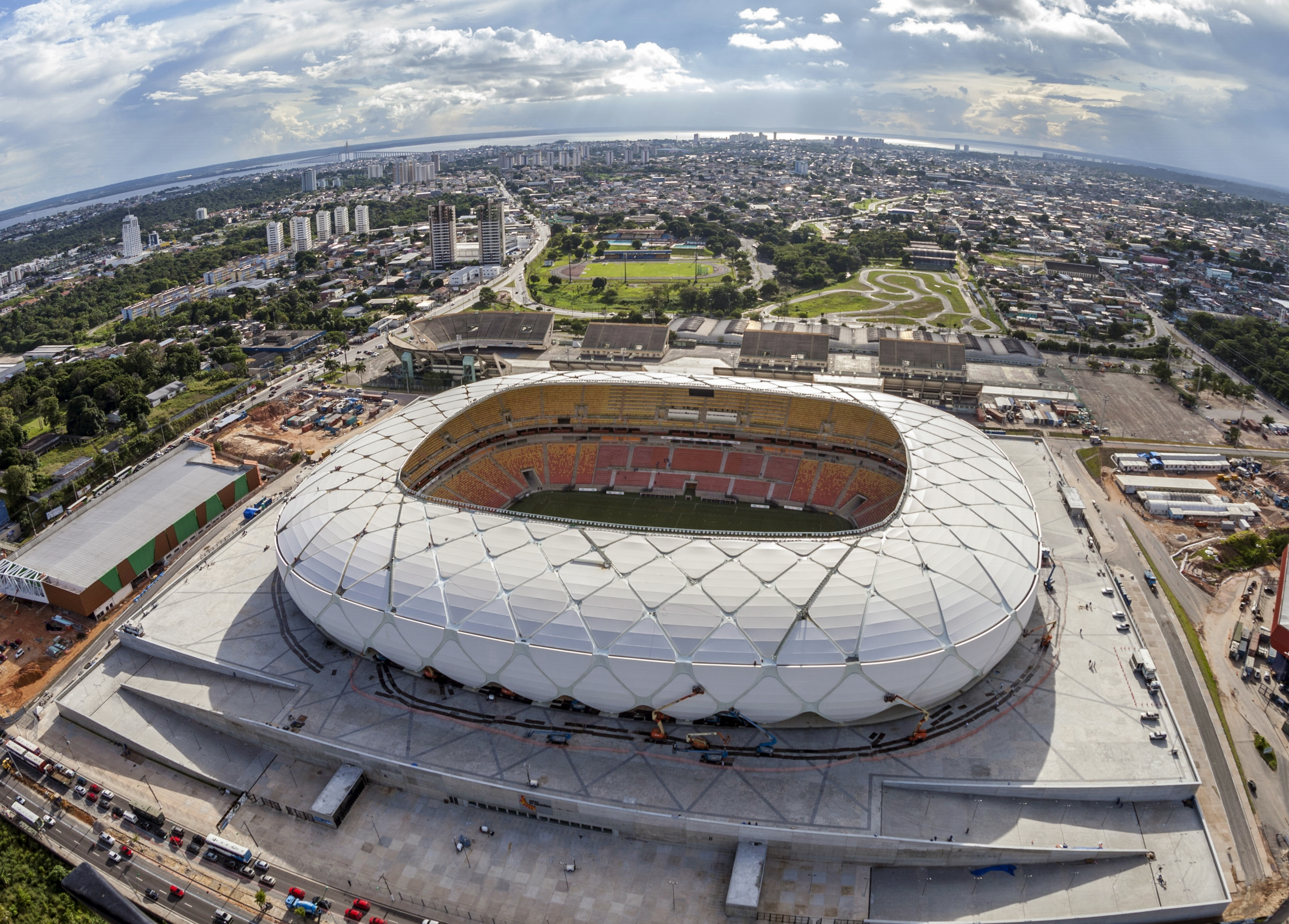
Arena da Amazônia, the second-largest stadium in Northern Brazil.

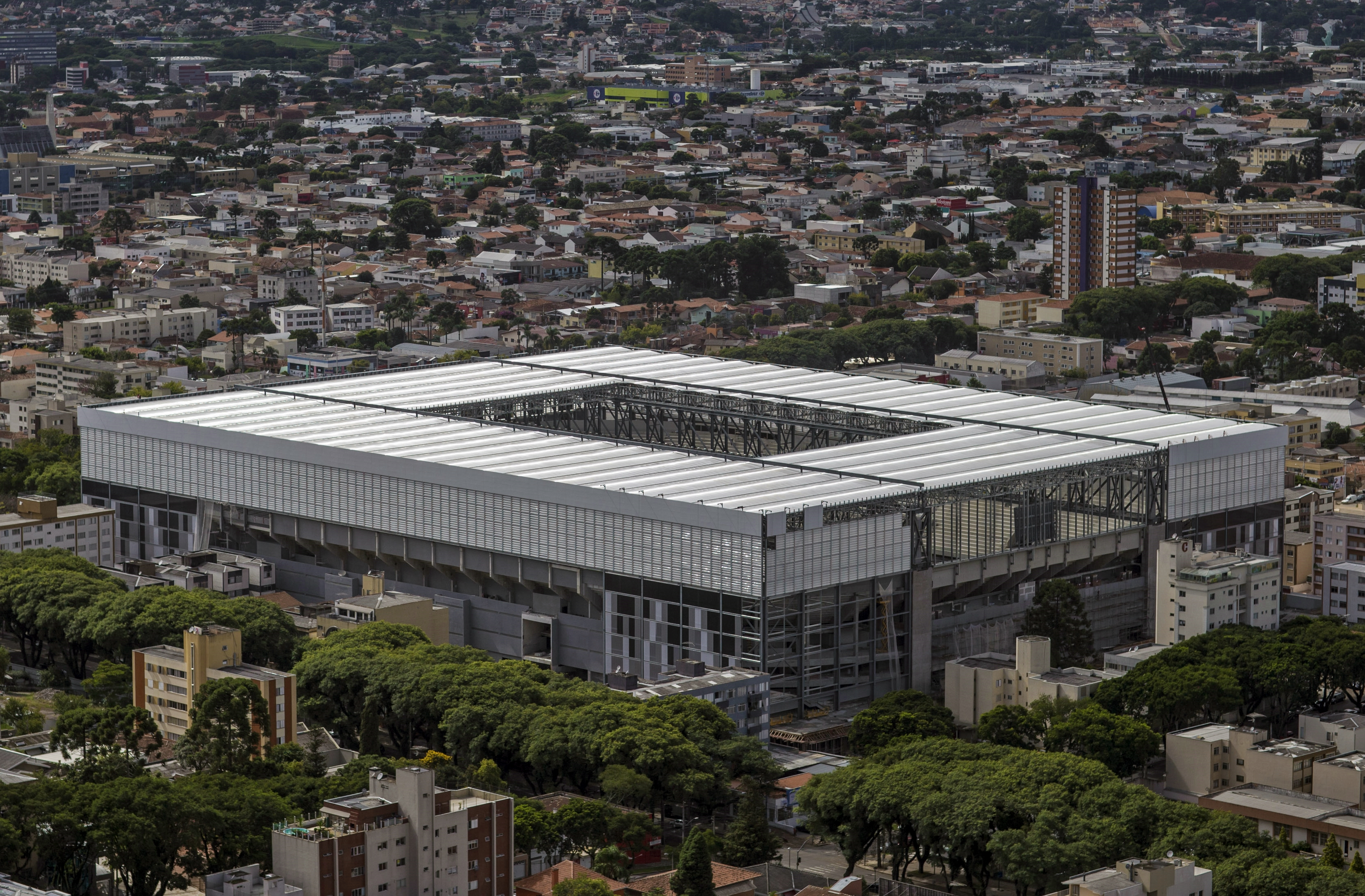
Arena da Baixada, the largest stadium in Paraná.

== Current stadiums ==
#	Image	Stadium	Capacity	City	State	Home team
1		Maracanã	73,193	Rio de Janeiro	Rio de Janeiro	Flamengo, Fluminense
2		Mané Garrincha	69,910	Brasília	Federal District	Brasília FC
3		Mineirão	66,658	Belo Horizonte	Minas Gerais	Cruzeiro
4		Morumbi	66,435	São Paulo	São Paulo	São Paulo FC
5		Arruda	60,044	Recife	Pernambuco	Santa Cruz
6		Arena Castelão	57,876	Fortaleza	Ceará	Ceará, Fortaleza EC
7		Arena do Grêmio	55,662	Porto Alegre	Rio Grande do Sul	Grêmio
8		Mangueirão	53,635	Belém	Pará	Paysandu, Remo
9		Beira-Rio	49,055	Porto Alegre	Rio Grande do Sul	Internacional
10		Casa de Apostas Arena Fonte Nova	47,915	Salvador	Bahia	EC Bahia
11		Arena Corinthians	47,252	São Paulo	São Paulo	Corinthians
12		Prudentão	45,954	Presidente Prudente	São Paulo	Grêmio Prudente
13		Arena Pernambuco	45,440	São Lourenço da Mata	Pernambuco	Retrô
14		Nilton Santos	45,000	Rio de Janeiro	Rio de Janeiro	Botafogo
15		Arena MRV	44,892	Belo Horizonte	Minas Gerais	Atlético Mineiro
16		Albertão	44,200	Teresina	Piauí	Flamengo-PI, River Atlético Clube
17		Nubank Parque	43,713	São Paulo	São Paulo	Palmeiras
18		Arena da Amazônia	42,924	Manaus	Amazonas	Amazonas, Manaus FC, Nacional
19		Arena Pantanal	42,788	Cuiabá	Mato Grosso	Cuiabá EC, Mixto
20		Arena da Baixada	42,372	Curitiba	Paraná	Athletico Paranaense
21		Serra Dourada	42,000	Goiânia	Goiás	
22		Couto Pereira	40,502	Curitiba	Paraná	Coritiba FC
23		Pacaembu	40,199	São Paulo	São Paulo	
24		Castelão	40,149	São Luís	Maranhão	Sampaio Corrêa
25		Parque do Sabiá	39,990	Uberlândia	Minas Gerais	Uberlândia EC
26		Barradão	35,000	Salvador	Bahia	Vitória EC
27		Mário Helênio	33,000	Juiz de Fora	Minas Gerais	Tupi FC
28		Ilha do Retiro	32,983	Recife	Pernambuco	Sport
29		Teixeirão	32,936	São José do Rio Preto	São Paulo	América Futebol Clube
30		Pituaçu	32,157	Salvador	Bahia	Galícia
31		Arena das Dunas	32,050	Natal	Rio Grande do Norte	América Futebol Clube
32		Brinco de Ouro	32,000	Campinas	São Paulo	Guarani
33		Arena Barueri	31,452	Barueri	São Paulo	Oeste
34		Estádio do Café	31,000	Londrina	Paraná	Londrina EC
35		Morenão	29,670	Campo Grande	Mato Grosso do Sul	Comercial-MS, Operário FC
36		Santa Cruz	29,292	Ribeirão Preto	São Paulo	Botafogo FC
37		Boca do Jacaré	28,800	Taguatinga	Federal District	Brasiliense FC
38		Manduzão	26,000	Pouso Alegre	Minas Gerais	Pouso Alegre FC
40		Olímpico Regional	25,000	Cascavel	Paraná	FC Cascavel
41		São Januário	24,584	Rio de Janeiro	Rio de Janeiro	Vasco da Gama
42		Major Levy Sobrinho	23,475	Limeira	São Paulo	AA Internacional
43		Independência	23,018	Belo Horizonte	Minas Gerais	América Futebol Clube
44		Aflitos	22,856	Recife	Pernambuco	Náutico
45		Canindé	22,375	São Paulo	São Paulo	Portuguesa
46		Centenário	22,132	Caxias do Sul	Rio Grande do Sul	Caxias
47		Arena Joinville	22,000	Joinville	Santa Catarina	Joinville EC
48		Colosso da Lagoa	22,000	Erechim	Rio Grande do Sul	Ypiranga FC
49		Fonte Luminosa	21,441	Araraquara	São Paulo	Ferroviária
50		Kleber Andrade	21,000	Cariacica	Espírito Santo	Rio Branco AC
51		Bezerrão	20,310	Gama	Federal District	SE Gama
52		Presidente Vargas	20,262	Fortaleza	Ceará	Ferroviário, Floresta, Tiradentes
53		Raulino de Oliveira	20,255	Volta Redonda	Rio de Janeiro	Volta Redonda FC
54		Vila Capanema	20,083	Curitiba	Paraná	Paraná Clube
55		Arena da Floresta	20,000	Rio Branco	Acre	Atlético Acreano, Galvez, Rio Branco FC
56		Willie Davids	20,000	Maringá	Paraná	Maringá FC
57		Alfredo Jaconi	19,924	Caxias do Sul	Rio Grande do Sul	Juventude
58		Heriberto Hülse	19,900	Criciúma	Santa Catarina	Criciúma EC
59		Vail Chaves	19,900	Mogi Mirim	São Paulo	Mogi Mirim EC
60		Moisés Lucarelli	19,728	Campinas	São Paulo	AA Ponte Preta
61		Orlando Scarpelli	19,584	Florianópolis	Santa Catarina	Figueirense
62		Lacerdão	19,478	Caruaru	Pernambuco	Central SC
63		Arena do Jacaré	19,000	Sete Lagoas	Minas Gerais	Democrata FC
64		Almeidão	19,000	João Pessoa	Paraíba	Auto EC, Botafogo FC, CSP
65		Amigão	19,000	Campina Grande	Paraíba	Campinense
66		Alfredo de Castilho	18,866	Bauru	São Paulo	Noroeste
67		Adail Nunes da Silva	18,805	Taquaritinga	São Paulo	CA Taquaritinga
68		Parque São Jorge	18,500	São Paulo	São Paulo	Corinthians U20s
69		Palma Travassos	18,277	Ribeirão Preto	São Paulo	Comercial FC
70		Novelli Júnior	18,000	itu	São Paulo	Ituano
71		Barão da Serra Negra	18,000	Piracicaba	São Paulo	XV de Piracicaba
72		Bento Freitas	18,000	Pelotas	Rio Grande do Sul	Brasil de Pelotas
73		Ítalo del Cima	18,000	Rio de Janeiro	Rio de Janeiro	Campo Grande AC
74		Luthero Lopes	18,000	Rondonópolis	Mato Grosso	União Rondonópolis
75		Vila Belmiro	17,872	Santos	São Paulo	Santos FC
76		Ressacada	17,826	Florianópolis	Santa Catarina	Avaí FC
77		Nabi Abi Chedid	17,128	Bragança Paulista	São Paulo	Red Bull Bragantino
78		Rei Pelé	17,126	Maceió	Alagoas	CRB, CSA
79		Martins Pereira	17,000	São José dos Campos	São Paulo	Joseense, São José EC
80		Silvio Salles	16,444	Catanduva	São Paulo	Catanduva FC
81		Uberabão	16,384	Uberaba	Minas Gerais	Nacional de Uberaba, Uberaba SC
82		Décio Vitta	16,300	Americana	São Paulo	Rio Branco EC
83		Jóia da Princesa	16,274	Feira de Santana	Bahia	Fluminense de Feira
84		Curuzu	16,200	Belém	Pará	Paysandu
85		Herminio Ometto	16,096	Araras	São Paulo	União São João
86		Dario Rodrigues Leite	16,095	Guaratinguetá	São Paulo	Manthiqueira
87		Ipatingão	16,000	Ipatinga	Minas Gerais	Ipatinga FC
88		Pedro Eymard	16,000	Morada Nova	Ceará	
89		Gilbertão	15,770	Lins	São Paulo	Linense
90		Arena Condá	15,765	Chapecó	Santa Catarina	Chapecoense
91		1º de Maio	15,759	São Bernardo do Campo	São Paulo	São Bernardo, EC São Bernardo
92		Batistão	15,586	Aracaju	Sergipe	Confiança, CS Sergipe
93		Boca do Lobo	15,478	Pelotas	Rio Grande do Sul	EC Pelotas
94		Melão	15,471	Varginha	Minas Gerais	Boa Esporte, Varginha EC
95		Fumeirão	15,332	Arapiraca	Alagoas	ASA
96		Jayme Cintra	15,155	Jundiaí	São Paulo	Paulista
97		Frasqueirão	15,082	Natal	Rio Grande do Norte	ABC
98		Bento de Abreu	15,010	Marília	São Paulo	Marília AC
99		14 de Dezembro	15,000	Toledo	Paraná	Toledo EC
100		Alfredo Chiavegato	15,000	Jaguariúna	São Paulo	Jaguariúna FC
101		Arapucão	15,000	Jataí	Goiás	Jataiense
102		Campo dos Cordeiros	15,000	São Gonçalo	Rio de Janeiro	
103		Carlos Affini	15,000	Paraguaçu Paulista	São Paulo	Paraguaçuense
104		JK	15,000	Itumbiara	Goiás	Itumbiara EC
105		José Maria Campos Maia	15,000	Mirassol	São Paulo	Mirassol FC
106		Maria Teresa Breda	15,000	Olímpia	São Paulo	Olímpia
107		Moacyrzão	15,000	Macaé	Rio de Janeiro	Macaé Esporte
108		Montanha dos Vinhedos	15,000	Bento Gonçalves	Rio Grande do Sul	Esportivo
109		Romeirão	15,000	Juazeiro do Norte	Ceará	Icasa
110		Vermelhão da Serra	15,000	Passo Fundo	Rio Grande do Sul	EC Passo Fundo
111		Antonio Lins Ribeiro Guimarães	14,913	Santa Bárbara D´Oeste	São Paulo	União Barbarense
112		José Lancha Filho	14,686	Franca	São Paulo	Francana
113		Anacleto Campanella	14,600	São Caetano do Sul	São Paulo	AD São Caetano
114		Serrinha	14,525	Goiânia	Goiás	Goiás EC
115		Hudson Buck Ferreira	14,500	Matão	São Paulo	Matonense
116		Francisco Nogueira Filho	14,384	Mogi das Cruzes	São Paulo	Atlético Mogi, União FC
117		Bruno José Daniel	14,185	Santo André	São Paulo	EC Santo André
118		Anísio Haddad	14,126	São José do Rio Preto	São Paulo	Rio Preto EC
119		Jorge Ismael de Biasi	14,096	Novo Horizonte	São Paulo	Grêmio Novorizontino
120		Amaros	14,074	Itápolis	São Paulo	
121		Passo D'Areia	14,000	Porto Alegre	Rio Grande do Sul	EC São José
122		Soares de Azevedo	13,971	Muriaé	Minas Gerais	Nacional AC
123		Walter Ribeiro	13,772	Sorocaba	São Paulo	EC São Bento
124		Zerão	13,680	Macapá	Amapá	Santos-AP, Trem, Ypiranga Clube
125		Giulite Coutinho	13,544	Mesquita	Rio de Janeiro	America Football Club
126		Olímpico de Goiânia	13,500	Goiânia	Goiás	Goiânia
127		Otacília Patrício Arroyo	13,100	Monte Azul Paulista	São Paulo	Monte Azul
128		Fortaleza	13,007	Barretos	São Paulo	Barretos EC
129		Oswaldo Scatena	13,000	Batatais	São Paulo	Batatais FC
130		Gigante do Norte	13,000	Sinop	Mato Grosso	Sinop FC
131		Zezinho Magalhães	12,978	Jaú	São Paulo	XV de Jaú
132		Lomantão	12,934	Vitória da Conquista	Bahia	Vitória da Conquista
133		Joaquinzão	12,896	Taubaté	São Paulo	EC Taubaté
134		José Liberatti	12,430	Osasco	São Paulo	Grêmio Osasco Audax
135		Serra do Lago	12,300	Luziânia	Goiás	AA Luziânia
136		Antônio Accioly	12,089	Goiânia	Goiás	Atlético Goianiense
137		Cornélio de Barros	12,070	Salgueiro	Pernambuco	Salgueiro AC
138		Ademir Cunha	12,000	Paulista	Pernambuco	América-PE, Íbis SC
139		Baenão	12,000	Belém	Pará	Clube do Remo
140		Caio Martins	12,000	Niterói	Rio de Janeiro	
141		Colosso do Tapajós	12,000	Santarém	Pará	São Francisco FC, São Raimundo EC, Tapajós FC
142		Marizão	12,000	Caicó	Rio Grande do Norte	AC Coríntians, Caicó EC
143		Vieirão	12,000	Quiterianópolis	Ceará	
144		Antônio Aquino Lopes	10,000	Rio Branco	Acre	
145		Estádio Nilton Santos	10,000	Palmas	Tocantins	
146		Estádio Municipal Antônio Fernandes	6,800	Guarujá	São Paulo	Associação Desportiva Guarujá
147		Annibal Batista de Toledo	6,645	Aparecida de Goiânia	Goiás	Aparecida EC, Aparecidense
148		Almeidão (MG)	6,555	Tombos	Minas Gerais	Tombense
149		Douradão	5,000	Dourados	Mato Grosso do Sul	Sete de Dourados
150		Augusto Bauer	5,000	Brusque	Santa Catarina	Brusque FC, Carlos Renaux

== See also ==
- List of association football stadiums by country
- List of sports venues by capacity
- Lists of stadiums
- Football in Brazil
