= Thomas Ben-Hur =

Brazilian footballer (born 1996)

Personal information
- Full name: Thomas Ben-Hur Sena Rojo Vega
- Date of birth: 8 May 1996 (age 30)
- Place of birth: Ubatuba, Brazil
- Height: 1.80 m (5 ft 11 in)
- Position: Right-back

Team information
- Current team: Uberlândia
- Number: 8

Youth career
- São José-SP
- Taubaté
- Palmeirinha
- Ferroviária
- 2015–2016: Audax Italiano

Senior career*
Years	Team	Apps	(Gls)
2017	José Bonifácio	0	(0)
2018	Potiguar de Mossoró	4	(0)
2019	Flamengo-SP	25	(3)
2020	Galvez	5	(0)
2020	Nacional-PR	19	(1)
2021	Galvez	0	(0)
2021	Atlético Acreano	23	(3)
2022	Resende	4	(0)
2022	Nacional de Muriaé	4	(0)
2022	Trindade	8	(0)
2023	Sertãozinho	12	(1)
2023	Boa Esporte	16	(2)
2023	→ CEOV (loan)	0	(0)
2024	Jataiense	11	(1)
2024	Santo André	14	(0)
2024	Portuguesa	0	(0)
2025	Boavista	12	(0)
2025–	Uberlândia	21	(0)
- * Club domestic league appearances and goals as of 17 August 2026

Thomas Ben-Hur Sena Rojo Vega (born 8 May 1996), known as Thomas Ben-Hur or just Ben-Hur, is a Brazilian footballer who plays as a right-back for Uberlândia.

== Career ==
Born in Ubatuba, São Paulo to a Chilean father and a Brazilian mother, Ben-Hur played for several clubs in his native state before joining the youth sides of Audax Italiano in 2015. After a period with José Bonifácio back in his home country in 2017, he signed for Potiguar de Mossoró on 5 January 2018.

On 24 March 2019, Ben-Hur joined Flamengo-SP. A regular starter as the club narrowly missed out promotion from the Campeonato Paulista Segunda Divisão, he subsequently played for Galvez and Nacional-PR in the 2020 season.

Ben-Hur returned to Galvez ahead of the 2021 campaign, but signed for Atlético Acreano in June of that year. On 28 December, he was announced at Resende.

In December 2022, after representing Nacional de Muriaé and Trindade, Ben-Hur agreed to a deal with Sertãozinho. He moved to Boa Esporte on 28 April 2023, before being loaned out to CEOV on 26 July.

On 20 December 2023, Ben-Hur was presented in the squad of Jataiense for the upcoming campaign. He joined Santo André the following 5 April, before being announced at Portuguesa on 26 July 2024.

As a player of Uberlândia, Ben-Hur helped them to get promotion to the 2027 Campeonato Brasileiro Série C.

== Career statistics ==
As of 15 November 2024

Club	Season	League			State League		Cup		Continental		Other		Total	
Club	Season	Division	Apps	Goals	Apps	Goals	Apps	Goals	Apps	Goals	Apps	Goals	Apps	Goals
José Bonifácio	2017	Paulista 2ª Divisão	—		0	0	—		—		—		0	0
Potiguar de Mossoró	2018	Potiguar	—		4	0	—		—		—		4	0
Flamengo-SP	2019	Paulista 2ª Divisão	—		25	3	—		—		—		25	3
Galvez	2020	Série D	—		5	0	1	0	—		2 (Note: Appearance(s) in Copa Verde)	0	8	0
Nacional-PR	2020	Paranaense Série Prata	—		8	0	—		—		—		8	0
Galvez	2021	Série D	—		0	0	1	0	—		0	0	1	0
Atlético Acreano	2021	Série D	12	1	11	2	—		—		—		23	3
Resende	2022	Carioca	—		4	0	—		—		—		4	0
Nacional de Muriaé	2022	Mineiro Módulo II	—		4	0	—		—		—		4	0
Trindade	2022	Goiano 3ª Divisão	—		8	0	—		—		—		8	0
Sertãozinho	2023	Paulista A3	—		12	1	—		—		—		12	1
Boa Esporte	2023	Mineiro Módulo II	—		16	2	—		—		—		16	2
CEOV (loan)	2023	Série D	0	0	—		—		—		6 (Note: Appearance(s) in Copa FMF)	0	6	0
Jataiense	2024	Goiano	—		11	1	—		—		—		11	1
Santo André	2024	Série D	14	0	—		—		—		—		14	0
Portuguesa	2024	Paulista	—		—		—		—		10 (Note: Appearance(s) in Copa Paulista)	0	10	0
Career total			26	1	108	9	2	0	0	0	18	0	154	10
