= Atlético Mogi =

- Full name: Clube Atlético Mogi das Cruzes de Futebol Ltda.
- Nickname(s): Maior de Mogi
- Founded: 19 April 2004; 21 years ago
- Ground: Estádio Francisco Nogueira
- Capacity: 14,384
- President: Roberto Costa Pinto
- League: Campeonato Paulista Segunda Divisão
- 2024: Paulista Segunda Divisão, 15th of 17
- Website: https://clubeatleticomogi.com/
Home colours	Away colours

Clube Atlético Mogi das Cruzes de Futebol Ltda., more commonly referred to as Atlético Mogi, is a Brazilian football club based in Mogi das Cruzes, São Paulo. The team compete in Campeonato Paulista Segunda Divisão, the fourth tier of the São Paulo state football league.

The club began to gain national relevance after repeating the feat of the Pernambuco club Ibis Sport Club, by not winning a single match in more than 55 disputed. The 62-matches winless streak was ended on 25 May 2023, when Atlético Mogi defeated Associação Desportiva Guarulhos.

== Stadium ==
Atlético Mogi play their home games at Estádio Municipal Francisco Ribeiro Nogueira, nicknamed Nogueirão. The stadium has a maximum capacity of 14,384 people.

== Rivalry with União Mogi ==
Due to the fact that União Mogi, the oldest and most traditional club in Mogi das Cruzes, also plays in the Campeonato Paulista Segunda Divisão, this then started to make the city's derby with Atlético Mogi.

Overall
As of 3 June 2023

Team	W	D	L	GF	GD
União Mogi	15	6	7	67	+39
Atlético Mogi	7	6	15	28	-39

Biggest União victory

- União Mogi 9–0 Atlético Mogi – Nogueirão, 7 November 2020

Biggest Atlético victory

- Atlético Mogi 3–1 União Mogi – Nogueirão, 31 May 2014

== Participations at Campeonato Paulista ==
Following is the list with all campaigns of Atlético Mogi in the professional level:

As of 2023 season

Season	Division	Pts	M	W	D	L	GF	GA	GD	Final position	N° of participants
2005	Segunda Divisão (4th level)	6	14	1	3	10	14	29	-15	37th (1st stage)	39
2006	Segunda Divisão (4th level)	25	18	7	4	7	32	22	+10	10th (2nd stage)	43
2007	Segunda Divisão (4th level)	22	14	6	4	4	25	16	+9	26th (1st stage)	48
2008	Segunda Divisão (4th level)	Did not play									
2009	Segunda Divisão (4th level)	29	20	7	8	5	32	39	-7	12th (3rd stage)	45
2010	Segunda Divisão (4th level)	22	14	6	4	4	24	17	+7	26th (1st stage)	46
2011	Segunda Divisão (4th level)	Did not play									
2012	Segunda Divisão (4th level)	14	16	4	2	10	17	36	-19	24th (2nd stage)	41
2013	Segunda Divisão (4th level)	5	10	0	5	5	10	22	-12	38th (1st stage)	45
2014	Segunda Divisão (4th level)	5	8	1	2	5	8	17	-9	36th (1st stage)	39
2015	Segunda Divisão (4th level)	Did not play									
2016	Segunda Divisão (4th level)	7	14	2	1	11	6	32	-26	29th (1st stage)	32
2017	Segunda Divisão (4th level)	4	12	1	1	10	6	30	-24	28th (1st stage)	29
2018	Segunda Divisão (4th level)	1	14	0	1	13	3	46	-43	40th (1st stage)	40
2019	Segunda Divisão (4th level)	1	12	0	1	11	8	45	-37	40th (1st stage)	41
2020	Segunda Divisão (4th level)	0	8	0	0	8	2	38	-36	35th (1st stage)	35
2021	Segunda Divisão (4th level)	0	10	0	0	10	6	37	-31	30th (1st stage)	30
2022	Segunda Divisão (4th level)	1	10	0	1	9	5	51	-46	36th (1st stage)	36
2023	Segunda Divisão (4th level)	10	10	3	1	6	8	14	-6	26th (1st stage)	36
16 participations		152	204	38	38	128	206	491	-285	Win% = 18,62%	

=== Series without a victory ===
Last win

- Atlético Mogi 1–0 Real Cubatense – Nogueirão, 17 June 2017

Matches without a victory

- 62 matches, last match Atlético Mogi 1–1 Flamengo – Nogueirão, 20 May 2023

Ibis previous record

- 55 matches without a victory

End of the series

On 27 May 2023, Atlético Mogin won AD Guarulhos by 1–0 and put an end on the series. In the total: 62 matches, 4 draws, 58 losses, 26 goals for, 234 goals against.
