= Kadu Barone =

Brazilian footballer

Personal information
- Full name: Carlos Eduardo Baroni Barboza
- Date of birth: 21 November 1994 (age 31)
- Place of birth: Ribeirão Preto, Brazil
- Height: 1.74 m (5 ft 9 in)
- Position: Left winger

Youth career
- 2009–2014: Botafogo-SP

Senior career*
Years	Team	Apps	(Gls)
2015	Olé Brasil	17	(6)
2016	Inter de Bebedouro	8	(2)
2016	Matonense	18	(7)
2017	Comercial-SP	15	(3)
2017	Cianorte	0	(0)
2017	Taquaritinga	7	(0)
2018	Rio Claro	14	(3)
2018	Mirassol	17	(2)
2019–2020	XV de Piracicaba	35	(3)
2020–2021	Ituano	42	(4)
2022	Botafogo-SP	12	(0)
2023	Comercial-SP	11	(0)
2023	Ferroviário	9	(1)
2024	Capital-DF	10	(4)
2024	North	3	(0)
2024	Itabaiana	10	(2)
2025	Piauí	1	(0)
2025	Hercílio Luz	11	(0)
2025	Brasiliense	3	(0)
2025	Manauara	14	(1)
2026–	Inter de Bebedouro	20	(8)
- * Club domestic league appearances and goals as of 10 May 2026

Carlos Eduardo Baroni Barboza (born 21 November 1994), better known as Cadu Baroni (also spelled as Kadu Barone), is a Brazilian professional footballer who plays as a left winger.

== Career ==
Revealed by the youth sectors of Botafogo-SP, Barone played most of his career in teams in the countryside of São Paulo. The most significant results in his career were the titles of the 2021 Série C with Ituano and the 2023 Série D with Ferroviário. In 2024 with Itabaiana, he achieved his fourth consecutive promotion in the lower divisions of the Brazilian Championship.

On 2025 season, Barone played for Piauí, Hercílio Luz, Brasiliense and Manauara.

== Personal life ==
Kadu is nephew of historic player for Botafogo-SP Zé Mario, who died in 1978 from leukemia.

== Honours ==
Ituano

- Campeonato Brasileiro Série C: 2021

Ferroviário

- Campeonato Brasileiro Série D: 2023

Individual

- 2026 Campeonato Paulista Série A4 top scorer: 8 goals
