= Magrão (footballer, born 1984) =

Brazilian footballer

Personal information
- Full name: Daniel de Jesus dos Santos
- Date of birth: 3 October 1984 (age 42)
- Place of birth: Ribeirão Preto
- Height: 1.91 m (6 ft 3 in)
- Position: Forward

Senior career*
Years	Team	Apps	(Gls)
2003–2004	Jaboticabal		
2005	Barretos		
2007	Caldense		
2008–2009	Penapolense		
2009–2010	Bragantino	13	(3)
2010–2011	Sport Barueri	0	(0)
2011–2012	Grêmio Barueri	26	(5)
2013	Penapolense	0	(0)
2013	Oeste	6	(0)
2013	Cuiabá	9	(6)
2014	Mogi Mirim	0	(0)
2014	CRB	16	(7)
2015	Mogi Mirim	2	(0)
2015–2016	Al-Markhiya		
2016–2017	São Bento	7	(4)
2017	Sertãozinho	0	(0)
2018	Rec do Libolo	16	(14)
2019	São Bernardo	0	(0)
2020	Sertãozinho	0	(0)
- * Club domestic league appearances and goals as of 20:31, 18 May 2019 (UTC)

Daniel de Jesus dos Santos (born 3 October 1984), known as Magrão, is a Brazilian footballer who plays as a forward.

In 2018, he signed in for Recreativo do Libolo in Angola's premier league, the Girabola.

== Career statistics ==
As of 30 January 2017

Club	Season	League			State League		Cup		Continental		Other		Total	
Club	Season	Division	Apps	Goals	Apps	Goals	Apps	Goals	Apps	Goals	Apps	Goals	Apps	Goals
Penapolense	2009	Paulista A3	—		22	16	—		—		—		22	16
Bragantino	2009	Série B	13	3	—		—		—		—		13	3
Bragantino	2010	Série B	—		2	0	—		—		—		2	0
Bragantino	Subtotal		13	3	2	0	—		—		—		15	3
Sport Barueri	2010	Paulista A3	—		—		—		—		13 (Note: All appearance(s) in Copa Paulista)	6	13	6
Sport Barueri	2011	Paulista A3	—		18	14	—		—		—		18	14
Sport Barueri	Subtotal		—		18	14	—		—		13	6	31	20
Grêmio Barueri	2011	Série B	5	0	—		—		—		—		5	0
Grêmio Barueri	2012	Série B	21	5	15	10	—		—		—		36	15
Grêmio Barueri	Subtotal		26	5	15	10	—		—		—		41	15
Penapolense	2013	Série D	—		19	4	—		—		—		19	4
Oeste	2013	Série B	6	0	—		—		—		—		6	0
Cuiabá	2013	Série C	9	6	—		—		—		—		9	6
Mogi Mirim	2014	Série C	—		7	6	—		—		—		7	6
CRB	2014	Série B	16	7	—		—		—		—		16	7
Mogi Mirim	2015	Série B	2	0	14	5	—		—		—		16	5
São Bento	2016	Série D	7	4	—		—		—		—		7	4
Career total			79	25	97	55	0	0	0	0	13	6	189	86
