= Campeonato Paulista Série B3 =

Football championship in Brazil

- Organising body: FPF
- Founded: 2001; 25 years ago
- Folded: 2003; 23 years ago
- Country: Brazil
- State: (São Paulo (state)) São Paulo
- Level on pyramid: 6
- Promotion to: Segunda Divisão
- Domestic cup: Copa Paulista
- Last champions: Força (1st title)
- Most championships: Corinthians B Jabaquara; Força (1 title each)
- Website: FPF Official website

Campeonato Paulista Série B3 was the sixth level of the São Paulo state professional football championship, one of the Brazilian state championships.

== List of champions ==
Year	Edition	Champion	City	Runners-up	City
2001	1	Corinthians B	São Paulo	Ponte Preta Sumaré	Sumaré
2002	2	Jabaquara	Santos	Portuguesa B	São Paulo
2003	3	Força	Caieiras	Tanabi	Tanabi

== Titles by team ==
Teams in bold stills active.

Rank	Club	Winners	Winning years
1	Corinthians B	1	2001
1	**Jabaquara**	1	2002
1	Força	1	2003

=== By city ===
City	Championships	Clubs
São Paulo	1	Corinthians B (1)
Santos	1	Jabaquara (1)
Caieiras	1	Força (1)

== See also ==
- Campeonato Paulista
- Campeonato Paulista Série A2
- Campeonato Paulista Série A3
- Campeonato Paulista Série A4
- Campeonato Paulista Segunda Divisão
- Federação Paulista de Futebol
