= Nívia de Lima =

Brazilian women's football manager

Personal information
- Full name: Nívia Maria Bezerra de Lima
- Date of birth: 3 June 1981 (age 45)
- Place of birth: São Lourenço da Mata, Brazil

Team information
- Current team: Chapecoense

Managerial career
- Years: Team
- 2024–: Chapecoense U20

Nívia Maria Bezerra de Lima (born 3 June 1981), simply known as Nívia de Lima, is a Brazilian football manager.

== Career ==
Before become a coach, Lima played futsal, winning the National League championship with the Chapecó women's futsal team. After retiring, she began working at football schools in the city, arriving at Chapecoense in 2012. In 2024, she was promoted to coach the under-20 team, and in 2025, she was defined to command the B team in the Copa Santa Catarina dispute. Lima is the second woman to manage a men's team in a professional competition in Brazil, after Nilmara Alves at Manthiqueira, between 2012 and 2017.

In 2026, she participated as a coach in Chapecoense campaign in the traditional Copa São Paulo de Futebol Júnior.
