= Fernandópolis Futebol Clube =

Football club in Fernandópolis, São Paulo, Brazil

Fernandópolis
- Full name: Fernandópolis Futebol Clube
- Nicknames: Águia de Sangue Azul (Blue-blooded eagle); Fefecê
- Founded: 15 November 1961; 64 years ago
- Ground: Ninho da Águia
- Capacity: 7,850
- 2024: Paulista Segunda Divisão, 16th of 17
Home colours	Away colours

Fernandópolis Futebol Clube, commonly referred to as Fernandópolis, is a Brazilian professional football club based in Fernandópolis, São Paulo. The club competes in the Campeonato Paulista Segunda Divisão, the fourth division in the São Paulo state football league system.

== History ==
The club was founded on 15 November 1961. They won the Campeonato Paulista Segunda Divisão in 1979 and in 1994.

== Honours ==
- Campeonato Paulista Série A4
  - Winners (2): 1979, 1994

== Stadium ==
Fernandópolis Futebol Clube play their home games at Estádio Municipal Cláudio Rodante, nicknamed Estádio Ninho da Águia. The stadium has a maximum capacity of 7,850 people.
