= Bandeirante Esporte Clube =

Bandeirante de Birigui
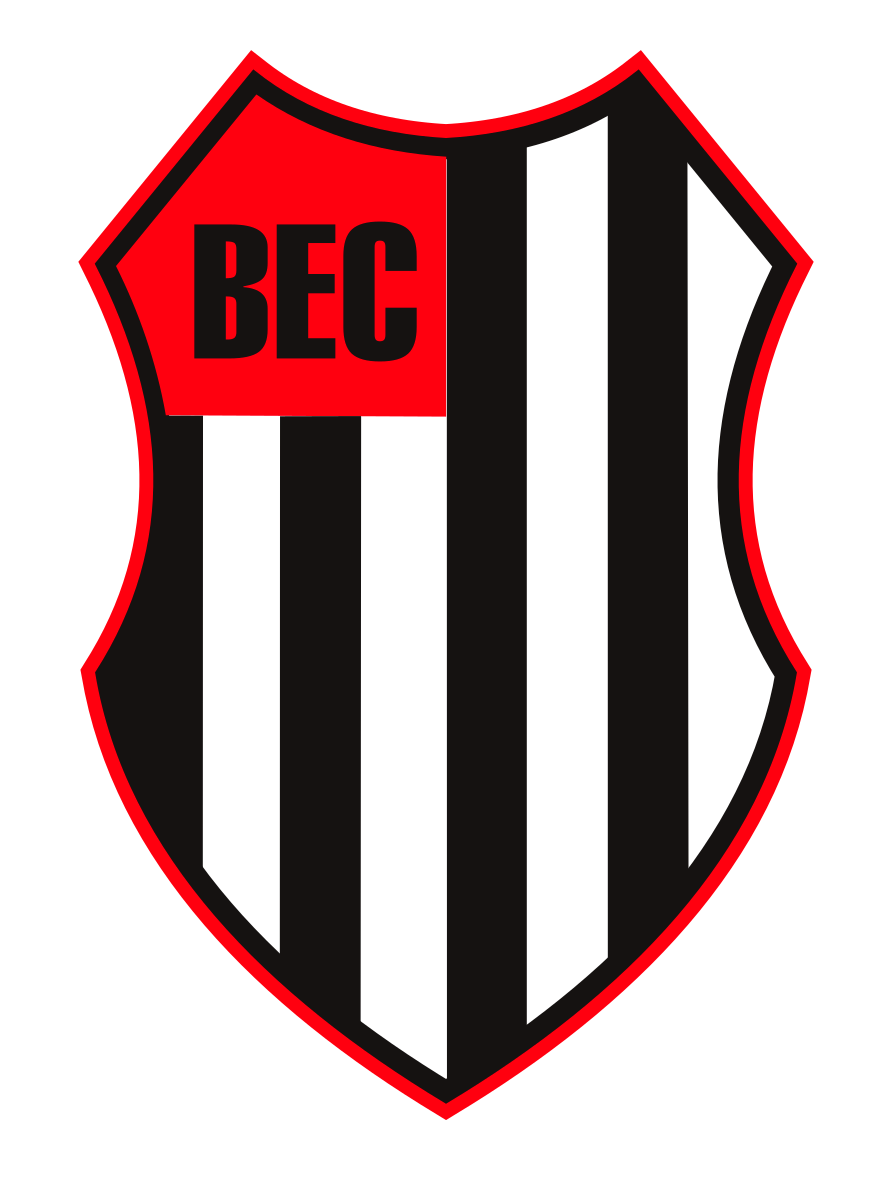
- Full name: Bandeirante Esporte Clube
- Nicknames: BEC; Leão da Noroeste
- Founded: 11 March 1923; 102 years ago
- Ground: Estádio Pedro Marin Berbel
- Capacity: 10,012
- Head coach: André Luís Alves
- League: Campeonato Paulista Série A3
- 2024: Paulista Série A3, 13th of 16
Home colours	Away colours	colours

Bandeirante Esporte Clube, or simply Bandeirante, is a Brazilian football team based in Birigui, São Paulo. Founded in 1965, it plays in Campeonato Paulista Série A3.

== History ==
The club was founded on March 11, 1923. They won the Campeonato Paulista Segunda Divisão in 1963, the Campeonato Paulista Série A2 in 1986 and the Copa Coca-Cola de Futebol in 2001.

== Honours ==
- Copa Paulista
  - Winners (1): 2001
- Campeonato Paulista Série A2
  - Winners (1): 1986
- Campeonato Paulista Série A4
  - Winners (1): 1963

== Stadium ==
Bandeirante Esporte Clube play their home games at Estádio Pedro Marin Berbel. The stadium has a maximum capacity of 10,012 people.
