= Zé Mário =

Zé Mário may refer to:

- Zé Mário (footballer, born 1949), full name José Mário de Almeida Barros, Brazilian football manager
- Zé Mário (footballer, born 1954), full name José Mário Crispim, Brazilian footballer
- Zé Mario (footballer, born 1957), full name José Mario Donizetti Baroni, Brazilian footballer
- Zé Mário (footballer, born 1992), full name José Mário de Bona, Brazilian footballer
