= Esporte Clube XV de Novembro =

Esporte Clube XV de Novembro may refer to:

- Esporte Clube XV de Novembro (Piracicaba), a Brazilian football club from Piracicaba
- Esporte Clube XV de Novembro (Jaú), a Brazilian football club from Jaú
- Esporte Clube XV de Novembro (Caraguatatuba), a Brazilian football club from Caraguatatuba
- Clube 15 de Novembro, a Brazilian football club from Campo Bom
