= Magrão =

Magrão (Portuguese: "skinny") may refer to:

== Association football ==
- Magrão (footballer, born 1974), Giuliano Tadeo Aranda, Brazilian striker
- Magrão (footballer, born 1977), Alessandro Beti Rosa, Brazilian goalkeeper
- Magrão (footballer, born 1978), Márcio Rodrigues, Brazilian defensive midfielder
- Magrão (footballer, born 1984), Daniel de Jesus dos Santos, Brazilian forward
- Magrão (footballer, born 2000), Audenirton Soares da Silva, Brazilian goalkeeper for Rio Ave
- Adriano Magrão (born 1981), Adriano Bizerra Melo, Brazilian striker
- Fábio Magrão (born 1977), Fábio Joaquim Maciel da Silva, Brazilian midfielder
- Gérson Magrão (born 1985), Gérson Alencar de Lima Júnior, Brazilian midfielder
- Willian Magrão (born 1987), Willian Henrique Antunes, Brazilian defensive midfielder

== Others ==
- Marcelo Guimarães (born 1983), nicknamed Magrão, Brazilian mixed martial artist
- MC Lord Magrão (born 1978), Brazilian musician and former member of Guillemots
