= Associação Atlética Internacional (Bebedouro) =

Inter de Bebedouro
- Full name: Associação Atlética Internacional
- Nicknames: Lobo vermelho Veterana
- Founded: 11 June 1906; 119 years ago
- Ground: Estádio Sócrates Stamato
- Capacity: 15,300
- President: Antônio Mignolo
- Head coach: Ney Silva
- League: Campeonato Paulista Série A4
- 2025: Paulista Série A4, 9th of 16
Home colors	Away colors

Associação Atlética Internacional, or simply Inter de Bebedouro, is a Brazilian football team based in Bebedouro, São Paulo. Founded in 1906, the club competes in Campeonato Paulista Segunda Divisão.

== History ==
The club was founded on June 11, 1906. They won the Taça Estado de São Paulo in 1979.

== Honours ==
- Copa Paulista
  - Winners (1): 1979

== Stadium ==
Associação Atlética Internacional play their home games at Estádio Sócrates Stamato. The stadium has a maximum capacity of 15,300 people.
