= Copa Paulista =

- Founded: 1962 (officially 1999)
- Region: (São Paulo (state)) São Paulo
- Teams: 24 (2020)
- Current champions: São José (1st title)
- Most championships: Paulista and XV de Piracicaba (3 titles)
- Broadcaster: Sky Uno

The Copa Paulista de Futebol, formerly known as Copa FPF, also sometimes called Copa Federação Paulista de Futebol or, in English, São Paulo State Cup, is a tournament organized by Federação Paulista de Futebol Company every second half of the season. It is played by São Paulo state teams not playing in the Campeonato Brasileiro Serie A and by reserve teams of Paulista teams playing in the Brazilian League.

The competition has already had several different names. In 2001, it was named Copa Coca-Cola (Coca-Cola Cup), due to the company's sponsorship. In 2002, it was named Copa Futebol Interior (São Paulo Countryside Football Cup). In 2003 it was named Copa Estado de São Paulo (São Paulo State Cup). From 2004 to 2007 it was named Copa FPF. Since 2008 it is named Copa Paulista de Futebol.

Since 2005, the competition winner gained the right to compete in the following year's Copa do Brasil. From 2007 to 2010, the Copa Paulista winner also competed in Recopa Sul-Brasileira.

== List of champions ==
There are all the championship editions, officially recognized by Federação Paulista de Futebol.

| Year | Edition | Name | Champion | City | Runners-up | City |
|---|---|---|---|---|---|---|
| 1962 | 1 | I Taça São Paulo | Corinthians | São Paulo | Santos | Santos |
| 1979 | 2 | Copa São Paulo de Futebol Profissional | Internacional | Bebedouro | Rio Branco | Ibitinga |
| 1980 | 3 | II Copa São Paulo de Futebol Profissional | Parque da Mooca | São Paulo | Sertãozinho | Sertãozinho |
| 1981 | 4 | III Copa São Paulo de Futebol Profissional | Oeste | Itápolis | Batatais | Batatais |
| 1985 | 5 | Copa 50 anos da FPF / 20 Anos da TV Globo | São Bento | Sorocaba | Sertãozinho | Sertãozinho |
| 1999 | 6 | Copa Estado de São Paulo | Etti Jundiaí | Jundiaí | Ituano | Itu |
| 2001 | 7 | Copa Coca-Cola | Bandeirante | Birigui | União Barbarense | Santa Bárbara d'Oeste |
| 2002 | 8 | Copa Estado de São Paulo / Futebol Interior | São Bento | Sorocaba | Jaboticabal | Jaboticabal |
| 2002 | 8 | Copa Mauro Ramos | Ituano | Itu | Santo André | Santo André |
| 2003 | 9 | Copa Estado de São Paulo | Santo André | Santo André | Ituano | Itu |
| 2004 | 10 | Copa FPF | Santos | Santos | Guarani | Campinas |
| 2005 | 11 | Copa FPF | Noroeste | Bauru | Rio Claro | Rio Claro |
| 2006 | 12 | Copa FPF | Ferroviária | Araraquara | Bragantino | Bragança Paulista |
| 2007 | 13 | Copa FPF - Heróis de 32 | Juventus | São Paulo | Linense | Lins |
| 2008 | 14 | Copa Paulista | Atlético Sorocaba | Sorocaba | XV de Piracicaba | Piracicaba |
| 2009 | 15 | Copa Paulista | Votoraty | Votorantim | Paulista | Jundiaí |
| 2010 | 16 | Copa Paulista | Paulista | Jundiaí | Red Bull Brasil | Campinas |
| 2011 | 17 | Copa Paulista | Paulista | Jundiaí | Comercial | Ribeirão Preto |
| 2012 | 18 | Copa Paulista - Heróis de 32 | Noroeste | Bauru | Audax | São Paulo |
| 2013 | 19 | Copa Paulista | São Bernardo FC | São Bernardo do Campo | Audax | São Paulo |
| 2014 | 20 | Copa Paulista | Santo André | Santo André | Botafogo | Ribeirão Preto |
| 2015 | 21 | Copa Paulista | Linense | Lins | Ituano | Itu |
| 2016 | 22 | Copa Paulista | XV de Piracicaba | Piracicaba | Ferroviária | Araraquara |
| 2017 | 23 | Copa Paulista | Ferroviária | Araraquara | Internacional | Limeira |
| 2018 | 24 | Copa Paulista | Votuporanguense | Votuporanga | Ferroviária | Araraquara |
| 2019 | 25 | Copa Paulista | São Caetano | São Caetano do Sul | XV de Piracicaba | Piracicaba |
| 2020 | 26 | Copa Paulista | Portuguesa | São Paulo | Marília | Marília |
| 2021 | 27 | Copa Paulista | São Bernardo FC | São Bernardo do Campo | Botafogo | Ribeirão Preto |
| 2022 | 28 | Copa Paulista | XV de Piracicaba | Piracicaba | Marília | Marília |
| 2023 | 29 | Copa Paulista | Portuguesa Santista | Santos | São José | São José dos Campos |
| 2024 | 30 | Copa Paulista | Monte Azul | Monte Azul Paulista | Votuporanguense | Votuporanga |
| 2025 | 31 | Copa Paulista | XV de Piracicaba | Piracicaba | Primavera | Indaiatuba |
| 2026 | 32 | Copa Paulista | São José | São José dos Campos | União São João | Araras |

== Titles by club ==
| Titles | Club | City |
|---|---|---|
| 3 | Paulista | Jundiaí |
| 3 | XV de Piracicaba | Piracicaba |
| 2 | Ferroviária | Araraquara |
| 2 | Noroeste | Bauru |
| 2 | Santo André | Santo André |
| 2 | São Bento | Sorocaba |
| 2 | São Bernardo FC | São Bernardo do Campo |
| 1 | Atlético Sorocaba | Sorocaba |
| 1 | Bandeirante | Birigui |
| 1 | Corinthians | São Paulo |
| 1 | Internacional | Bebedouro |
| 1 | Ituano | Itu |
| 1 | Juventus | São Paulo |
| 1 | Linense | Lins |
| 1 | Monte Azul | Monte Azul Paulista |
| 1 | Oeste | Itápolis |
| 1 | Parque da Mooca | São Paulo |
| 1 | Portuguesa | São Paulo |
| 1 | Portuguesa Santista | Santos |
| 1 | Santos | Santos |
| 1 | São Caetano | São Caetano do Sul |
| 1 | São José | São José dos Campos |
| 1 | Votoraty | Votorantim |
| 1 | CA Votuporanguense | Votuporanga |

Names change

- During a partnership with the food brand Etti, Paulista FC played in some championships under the name "Etti Jundiaí".

Cities change

- Oeste FC has moved from Itápolis to Barueri.
