= Esporte Clube Osasco =

ECO
- Full name: Esporte Clube Osasco
- Nickname(s): Moleque
- Founded: 21 December 1984; 40 years ago
- Ground: Estádio José Liberatti
- Capacity: 5,600
Home colours	Away colours

Esporte Clube Osasco, commonly known as ECO, or also as Osasco, is a currently inactive Brazilian football club based in Osasco, São Paulo state.

== History ==
The club was founded on February 21, 1984. They won the Campeonato Paulista Série B2 in 2000, and the Campeonato Paulista Segunda Divisão in 2001.

== Honours ==
- Campeonato Paulista Série A4
  - Winners (1): 2001
- Campeonato Paulista Segunda Divisão
  - Winners (1): 2000

== Stadium ==
Esporte Clube Osasco play their home games at Estádio José Liberatti. The stadium has a maximum capacity of 5,600 people.
