= Jaboticabal Atlético =

Brazilian soccer club founded 1911

Jaboticabal
- Full name: Jaboticabal Atlético
- Nickname(s): Esquadrão de Aço; Jotão; Tigre de Atenas; Alvinegro; Time da Marechal
- Founded: 30 April 1911; 113 years ago
- Ground: Robert Todd Locke
- Capacity: 7,512
Home colours	Away colours	colours

Jaboticabal Atlético, commonly known as Jaboticabal, is a currently inactive Brazilian football club based in Jaboticabal, São Paulo state.

== History ==
The club was founded on 30 April 1911. They won the Campeonato Paulista Segunda Divisão in 1989 and in 1996, and the Campeonato Paulista Série A3 in 1990.

== Honours ==
- Campeonato Paulista Série A3
  - Winners (1): 1990
- Campeonato Paulista Série A4
  - Winners (2): 1989, 1996

== Stadium ==
Jaboticabal Atlético play their home games at Estádio Doutor Robert Todd Locke, also known as Estádio Todd Locke. The stadium has a maximum capacity of 10,450 people.
