= Associação Atlética Itararé =

Itararé
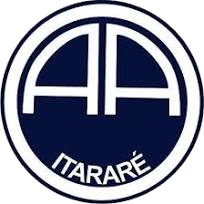
- Full name: Associação Atlética Itararé
- Founded: 20 October 1950; 74 years ago
- Ground: Estádio Vergínio Holtz
- Capacity: 5,500
- President: Artur de Fátima Souza
- 2022: Paulista Segunda Divisão, 8th of 36
Home colors	Away colors

Associação Atlética Itararé, simply known as Itararé, is a Brazilian football club based in Itararé, São Paulo.

== History ==
The club was established on 20 October 1950 after the merge of the clubs EC Bandeirantes and GE Ford. It entered in the professional football for the first time in the year of 1986. The club best result is the runners-up of 2004 Campeonato Paulista Série B2 (fifth level).

== Appearances ==
Following is the summary of Itararé appearances in Campeonato Paulista.

Season	Division	Final position
2017	4th	11th
2018	4th	8th
2019	4th	19th
2020	4th	6th
2021	Did not play	
2022	4th	8th
2023	Did not play	
2024	Did not play	
2025	Did not play	
