= Associação Desportiva Guarulhos =

Guarulhos
- Full name: Associação Desportiva Guarulhos
- Nickname: Índio Guaru
- Founded: 1 February 1969; 57 years ago
- Ground: Antônio Soares de Oliveira
- Capacity: 15,000
- League: Campeonato Paulista Segunda Divisão
- 2025: Paulista Segunda Divisão, 7th of 15
Home colours	Away colours

Associação Desportiva Guarulhos, or simply Guarulhos, is a Brazilian football team based in Guarulhos, São Paulo. Founded in 1964, it plays in Campeonato Paulista Segunda Divisão.

The club was formerly known as Associação Desportiva Vila das Palmeiras.

== History ==
The club was founded on January 1, 1964, as Associação Desportiva Vila das Palmeiras. It professionalized their football department in 1981, and adopted the name Associação Desportiva Guarulhos in 1994.

== Stadium ==
Associação Desportiva Guarulhos plays its home games at Estádio Municipal Antônio Soares de Oliveira. The stadium has a maximum capacity of 15,000 people.
