= União Futebol Clube =

União Mogi
- Full name: União Futebol Clube
- Nickname: Serpente do Tietê
- Founded: 7 September 1913; 113 years ago
- Ground: Francisco Ribeiro Nogueira
- Capacity: 14,384
- President: Osmar Novaes
- Head Coach: Matosinhos
- League: Campeonato Paulista Segunda Divisão
- 2025: Paulista Segunda Divisão, 14th of 15
Home colours	Away colours	colours

União Futebol Clube, more commonly referred to as União Mogi, is a Brazilian football club based in Mogi das Cruzes, São Paulo. The team compete in Campeonato Paulista Segunda Divisão, the fourth tier of the São Paulo state football league.

The club was formerly known as União Mogi das Cruzes Futebol Clube.

== History ==
União Futebol Clube was founded on 7 September 1913, professionalizing its football department in 1951. The club was renamed to União Mogi das Cruzes Futebol Clube in 1998, eventually being renamed back to União Futebol Clube. União Mogi won the Campeonato Paulista Segunda Divisão in 2006.

== Achievements ==
- Campeonato Paulista Série A4:
  - Winners (1): 2006

== Stadium ==
União Futebol Clube play their home games at Estádio Municipal Francisco Ribeiro Nogueira, nicknamed Nogueirão. The stadium has a maximum capacity of 14,384 people.
