= Clube Atlético Jalesense =

Jalesense
- Full name: Clube Atlético Jalesense
- Founded: January 3, 1960
- Ground: Estádio Roberto Valle Rolemberg
- Capacity: 5,000
Home colours	Away colours

Clube Atlético Jalesense, commonly known as Jalesense, is a currently inactive Brazilian football club based in Jales, São Paulo.

== History ==
The club was founded on January 3, 1960. They won the Campeonato Paulista Série B2 in 2003.

== Honours ==
- Campeonato Paulista Segunda Divisão
  - Winners (1): 2003

== Stadium ==
Clube Atlético Jalesense play their home games at Estádio Roberto Valle Rolemberg. The stadium has a maximum capacity of 5,000 people.
