= Estádio Municipal dos Amaros =

Soccer stadium in Itápolis, Brazil

Amaros
- Interactive map of Amaros
- Full name: Estádio Municipal dos Amaros
- Location: Itápolis, São Paulo, Brazil
- Owner: Itapolis Municipality
- Capacity: 6,000
- Surface: Natural grass
- Field size: 105 by 68 metres (114.8 yd × 74.4 yd)

Construction
- Opened: 1928

Tenant
- Oeste (1928–2016)

Estádio Municipal dos Amaros is a stadium in Itápolis, Brazil. It has a capacity of 6,000 spectators. It was the home of Oeste Futebol Clube before they moved to Barueri.
