= José Bonifácio Esporte Clube =

José Bonifácio
- Full name: José Bonifácio Esporte Clube
- Nicknames: Serpente do Vale; Tricolor do Vale
- Founded: February 1, 1961
- Ground: Pereirão, José Bonifácio, São Paulo state, Brazil
- Capacity: 5,662
- President: Valdeci Urbano
- Head coach: Carlinhos
Home colors	Away colors

José Bonifácio Esporte Clube, usually known simply as José Bonifácio, is a currently inactive Brazilian football club from José Bonifácio, São Paulo state.

== History ==
Founded on 1 February 1961, José Bonifácio only disputed their first official tournament in 1972. In their debut year, the club was crowned champions of Campeonato Paulista Série A3 after defeating Pirassununguense in the final.

After only playing in the lower levels of Campeonato Paulista, José Bonifácio until 1998, when the club opted not to play in any official competition. The club only returned in 2005, but was again licensed in 2008.

== Stadium ==
José Bonifácio play their home games at Estádio Municipal Antônio Pereira Braga, nicknamed Pereirão, Zebão or Toca da Serpente (Snake's Lair). The stadium has a maximum capacity of 5,662 people.

== Honours ==
- Campeonato Paulista Série A3
  - Winners: 1972
- Campeonato Paulista Série A4
  - Winners: 1991
