= Academia Desportiva Manthiqueira Futebol =

Manthiqueira
- Full name: Academia Desportiva Manthiqueira Futebol
- Nickname(s): Carrossel do Vale
- Founded: 4 August 2005; 20 years ago
- Ground: Professor Dario Rodrigues Leite
- Capacity: 15,769
- President: Geraldo Margelo Oliveira
- Head Coach: Dado Oliveira
- League: Campeonato Paulista Segunda Divisão
- 2024: Paulista Segunda Divisão, 12th of 17
Home colours	Away colours

Academia Desportiva Manthiqueira Futebol, more commonly referred to as Manthiqueira, is a Brazilian football club based in Guaratinguetá, São Paulo. The team compete in Campeonato Paulista Segunda Divisão, the fourth tier of the São Paulo state football league. The club was formerly known as Associação Desportiva Manthiqueira.

== History ==
The club was founded on August 4, 2005, as Associação Desportiva Manthiqueira, and moved to Guaratinguetá city in late 2010, adopting the name Academia Desportiva Manthiqueira Futebol.

== Players ==
=== First-team squad ===
As of 18 September 2020

Note: Flags indicate national team as defined under FIFA eligibility rules; some limited exceptions apply. Players may hold more than one non-FIFA nationality.

No.	Pos.	Nation	Player
—	GK	BRA	Giovani
—	GK	BRA	Yago
—	GK	BRA	Ricardo
—	GK	BRA	Felipe
—	DF	BRA	Danilo Alemão
—	DF	BRA	Vitão
—	DF	BRA	Guilherme
—	DF	BRA	Edinei
—	DF	BRA	Vinícius Cachorro
—	DF	BRA	João Victor Esquilo
—	DF	BRA	Silas
—	DF	BRA	Ruan
—	DF	BRA	Índio
—	DF	BRA	Matheuzinho
—	DF	BRA	Julio
—	MF	BRA	Douglas Carvalhan

No.	Pos.	Nation	Player
—	MF	BRA	Eduardo
—	MF	BRA	Rodrigo
—	MF	BRA	Lucas Malta
—	MF	BRA	Yamasaki
—	MF	BRA	Mariano
—	MF	BRA	Matheus Piauí
—	MF	BRA	Klebinho
—	MF	BRA	Wendel
—	FW	BRA	Daniel
—	FW	BRA	Rodriguinho
—	FW	BRA	Ivan
—	FW	BRA	Conrado
—	FW	BRA	Jacó
—	FW	BRA	Miquéias
—	FW	BRA	Ronald
—	FW	BRA	Guilherme Piteco

== Stadium ==
Academia Desportiva Manthiqueira Futebol play their home games at Estádio Municipal Professor Dario Rodrigues Leite, commonly known as Ninho da Garça. The stadium has a maximum capacity of 15,769 people.

== Honours ==
- Campeonato Paulista Série A4
  - Winners: 2017
