= José Bonifácio, São Paulo =

José Bonifácio
- Municipality
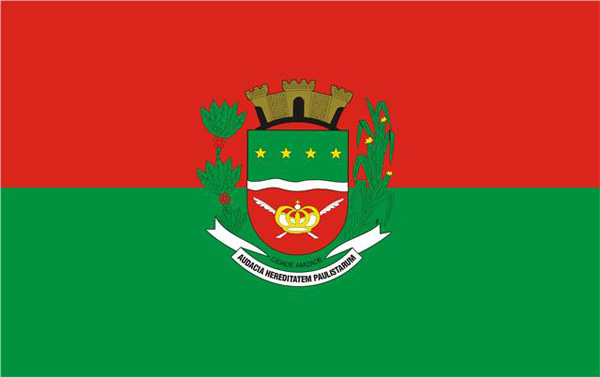
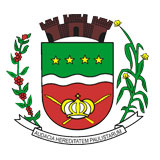
- Flag Coat of arms

- Location in São Paulo state

- Location in Brazil
- Coordinates: 21°03′10″S 49°41′16″W
- Country: Brazil
- Region: Southeast
- State: São Paulo
- Mesoregion: São José do Rio Preto
- Microregion: São José do Rio Preto

Area
  - Total: 859.94 km^{2} (332.02 sq mi)
- Elevation: 458 m (1,503 ft)

Population (2020)
  - Total: 37,366
  - Density: 43.452/km^{2} (112.54/sq mi)
- Time zone: UTC−3 (BRT)
- Postal code: 15200-000
- Area code: +55 17
- Website: www.josebonifacio.sp.gov.br

José Bonifácio is a municipality in the state of São Paulo, Brazil. The population is of 37,366 inhabitants and the area is 859.94 km^{2}. The city belongs to the Microregion of São José do Rio Preto.

== History ==
The history of José Bonifácio begins in 1906. The founder of the city, José Crescencio de Souza, built the first three houses. In 1910, the brothers Manuel, Justino e Carlos Rodrigues de Sant’Anna donated part of their land to the Catholic Church. The first chapel was built in 1913, and the town received the name of Cerradão.

In 1914, the town was elevated to district and on December 23, 1924, became a district of Mirassol, changing its name to the current form. José Bonifácio was officially established as a municipality on December 28, 1926.

== Economy ==
The Tertiary sector is the economic basis of Bonifácio. Commerce, services and administration corresponds to 62.3% of the city GDP. Industry is 29.2% of the GDP, and the Primary sector corresponds to 8.5%.

== Media ==
In telecommunications, the city was served by Telecomunicações de São Paulo. In July 1998, this company was acquired by Telefónica, which adopted the Vivo brand in 2012. The company is currently an operator of cell phones, fixed lines, internet (fiber optics/4G) and television (satellite and cable).

== Transportation ==
- BR-153 - Rodovia Transbrasiliana
- SP-425 - Rodovia Assis Chateaubriand

== See also ==
- List of municipalities in São Paulo
- Interior of São Paulo
