= Barretos Esporte Clube =

Association football club in Brazil

Barretos
- Full name: Barretos Esporte Clube
- Nickname(s): Touro do Vale
- Founded: 28 October 1960; 64 years ago
- Ground: Fortaleza
- Capacity: 13,007
- League: Campeonato Paulista Série A4
- 2024: Paulista Série A4, 7th of 16
Home colours	Away colours

Barretos Esporte Clube, commonly referred to as Barretos, is a Brazilian professional association football club based in Barretos, São Paulo. The team competes in the Campeonato Paulista Série A3, the third tier of the São Paulo state football league.

== History ==
The club was founded on October 28, 1960. In 1998, they finished in the second position in the Campeonato Paulista Segunda Divisão, losing the competition to Oeste.

== Honours ==
- Troféu Menezis Balbo
  - Winners (1): 2003

== Stadium ==
Barretos Esporte Clube play their home games at Estádio Antônio Gomes Martins, nicknamed Estádio Fortaleza. The stadium has a maximum capacity of 14,000 people.
