= Zé Mario (footballer, born 1957) =

Brazilian footballer (1957–1978)

Personal information
- Full name: José Mario Donizetti Baroni
- Date of birth: 1 May 1957
- Place of birth: Ribeirão Preto, Brazil
- Date of death: 7 June 1978 (aged 21)
- Place of death: Ribeirão Preto, Brazil
- Position: Right winger

Youth career
- 1973–1976: Botafogo-SP

Senior career*
Years	Team	Apps	(Gls)
1976–1978	Botafogo-SP		

International career
1977	Brazil	1	(0)
- * Club domestic league appearances and goals

José Mario Donizetti Baroni (1 May 1957 – 7 June 1978), better known as Zé Mario, was a Brazilian professional footballer who played as a right winger for Botafogo-SP.

== Career ==
Zé Mario arrived at Botafogo-SP in 1973, and in 1976 he was promoted to the professional team. He was the club's first player to be called up to the Brazil national team, in addition to being part of the Taça Cidade de São Paulo title campaign, the first round of the 1977 Campeonato Paulista.

== Death ==
Zé Mario, who frequently felt pain and was unable to train, after facing England on 8 June 1977, when taking the mandatory exams with the Brazil national team, he was diagnosed with leukemia. He died on 7 June 1978, at the Beneficiência Portuguesa Hospital in Ribeirão Preto.

== Honours ==
Botafogo-SP

- Taça Cidade de São Paulo: 1977
