= Esporte Clube XV de Novembro (Caraguatatuba) =

- Full name: XV de Caraguatatuba
- Nickname(s): Leão do Litoral
- Founded: February 18, 1934
- Ground: Estádio XV de Novembro, Caraguatatuba, São Paulo state, Brazil
- Capacity: 5,600
| Home colours | Away colours |

Esporte Clube XV de Novembro, commonly known as XV de Caraguatatuba, is a Brazilian football club based in Caraguatatuba, São Paulo state.

== History ==
The club was founded on February 18, 1934. They finished as the Campeonato Paulista Segunda Divisão runners-up in 1997.

== Stadium ==
XV de Caraguatatuba play their home games at Estádio XV de Novembro. The stadium has a maximum capacity of 5,600 people.
