= Bebedouro =

Municipality in the state of São Paulo in Brazil

- Municipality
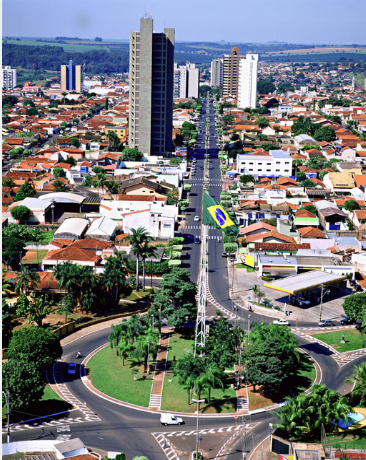
- View of Bebedouro

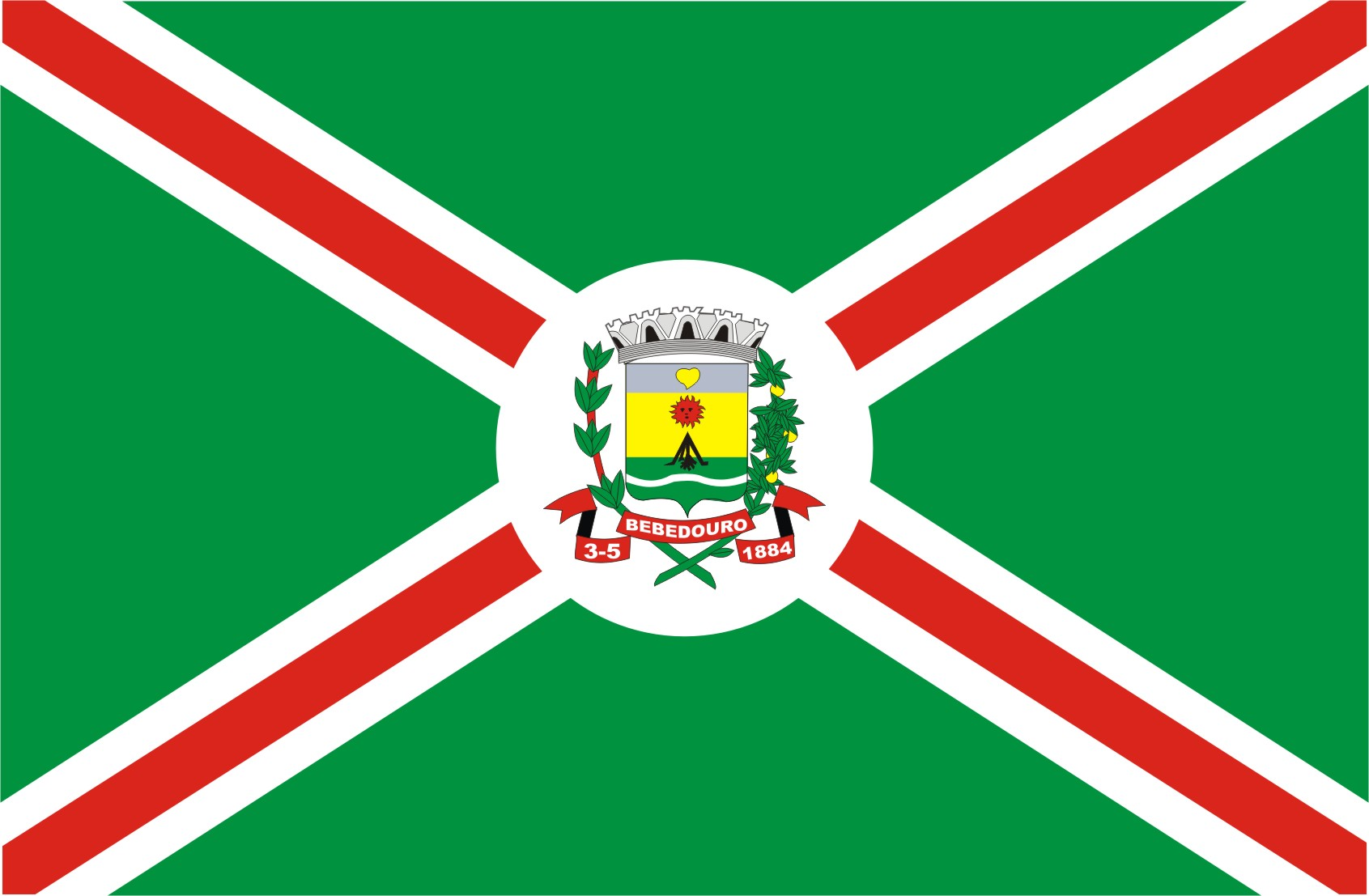
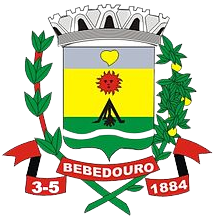
- Flag Coat of arms

- Location in São Paulo state

- Location in Brazil
- Coordinates: 20°56′58″S 48°28′45″W
- Country: Brazil
- Region: Southeast
- State: São Paulo

Area
  - Total: 683.2 km^{2} (263.8 sq mi)

Population (2020)
  - Total: 77,555
  - Density: 113.5/km^{2} (294.0/sq mi)
- Time zone: UTC-03:00 (BRT)
  - Summer (DST): UTC-02:00 (BRST)

Bebedouro is a municipality in the state of São Paulo in Brazil. The population is 77,555 (2020 est.) in an area of 683.2 square kilometres (263.8 mi^{2}). The elevation is 573 metres (1,880 ft). The distance from São Paulo city is about 390 km.

== History ==
The foundation of the city took place on May 3, 1884. The name comes from a stream used by cowboys in the 19th century for stopping and taking water. The city grew because of coffee, and, today, it is famous because of orange cultivation and orange juice factories.

== Geography ==
The municipality contains 3 districts: Bebedouro (the main district), Botafogo (2,000 inhabitants) and Turvínea (1,000 inhabitants). There are two more villages: Andes (500 inhabitants) and Areias (less than 50 inhabitants). Andes is considered as an urban area, although it is not officially a district. There is another locality known historically because in the past it was a train station between Bebedouro and Botafogo: Mirante de São Paulo.

== Demography ==
=== Demographics ===
Historical population (municipality)
Year	Population	%±
1920	28,803
1940	28,194	−2.1%
1950	27,238	−3.4%
1960	31,961	17.3%
1970	37,816	18.3%
1980	46,034	21.7%
1991	67,763	47.2%
2000	74,815	10.4%
2010	75,035	0.3%
2022	76,373	1.8%

== Infrastructure ==
In Bebedouro, there are 3 hospitals, 13 health centers, several shopping stores (including a mall with more than 50 stores), 1 movie theater, 1 theater, three museums (one historical, one at the older train station, and another with old cars, airplanes and guns, known as "Museu Matarazzo"), 1 cultural center, more than 10 supermarkets (including 4 hypermarkets), two colleges, more than 30 schools, and 7 hotels (4 of good quality).

For leisure, there are 4 large parks (Horto, Ecológico, Sinésio Junqueira Franco e Centenário). The most important park is "Parque do Centenário", located in downtown, with a large lake (whose surrounding areas is called "Região do Lago"), squares, sport courts, sport fields, space for walkers, runners, skaters and a "sambódromo" (space for carnival parades). Alongside this park, there are several bars, snack bars, restaurants, dancing clubs and small amusement parks.

There are boulevards linking the downtown to the periphery. These boulevards are interlinked by a system with circular avenues. The public transport has 6 routes with a headway of 30 minutes each. There are not free transfers between the routes. The economy of the municipality is based on orange crops and orange juice industry.

== Media ==
In telecommunications, the city was served by Companhia Telefônica Brasileira until 1973, when it began to be served by Telecomunicações de São Paulo. In July 1998, this company was acquired by Telefónica, which adopted the Vivo brand in 2012.

The company is currently an operator of cell phones, fixed lines, internet (fiber optics/4G) and television (satellite and cable).

== Religion ==
Christianity is present in the city as follows:

=== Protestant Church ===
The most diverse evangelical beliefs are present in the city, mainly Pentecostal, including the Assemblies of God in Brazil (the largest evangelical church in the country), Christian Congregation in Brazil, among others. These denominations are growing more and more throughout Brazil.

== See also ==
- List of municipalities in São Paulo
- Interior of São Paulo
