= Jaboticabal =

- Municipality
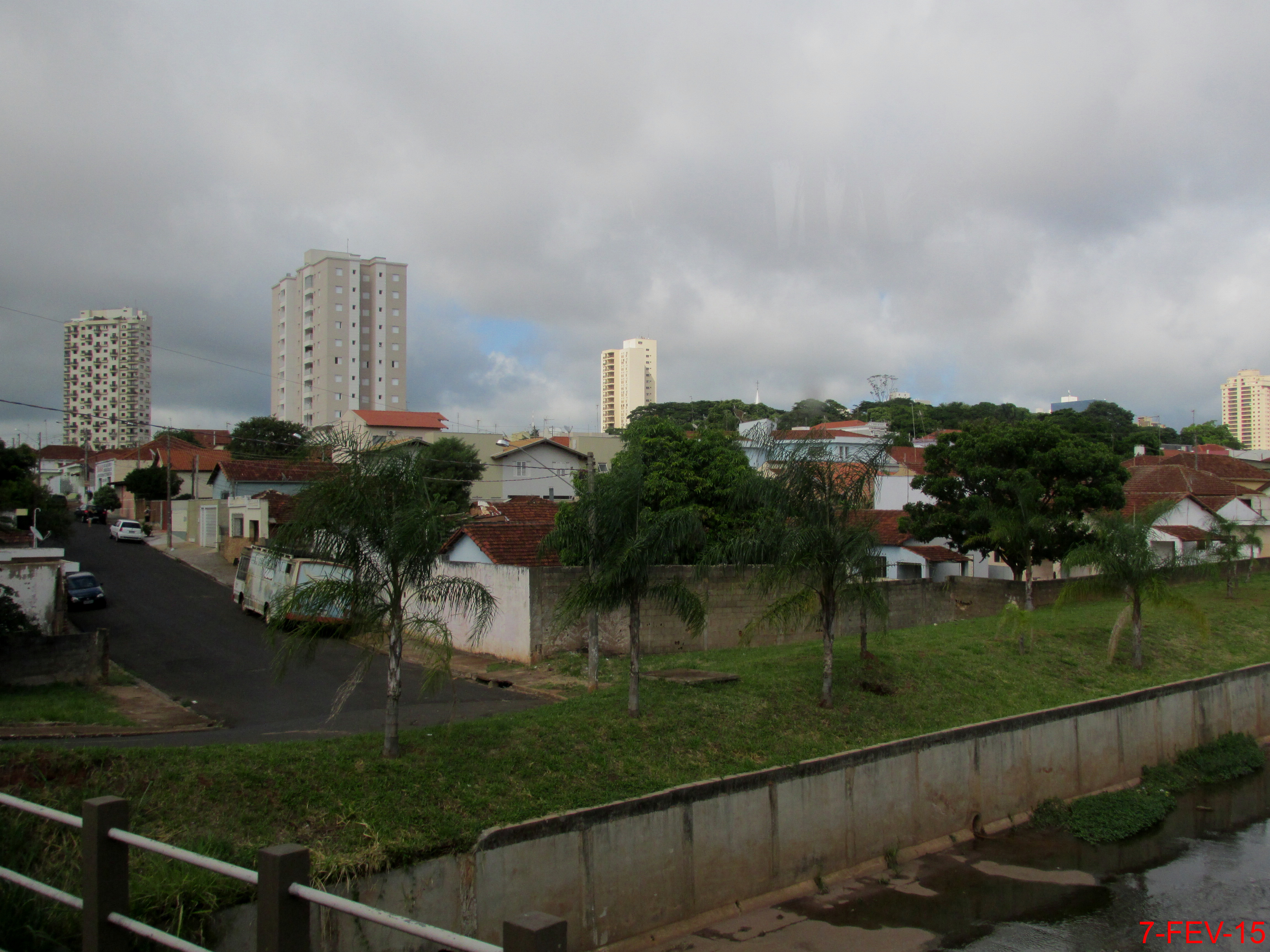

- Flag Coat of arms

- Location in São Paulo state

- Location in Brazil
- Coordinates: 21°15′17″S 48°19′20″W
- Country: Brazil
- Region: Southeast
- State: São Paulo
- Mesoregion: Ribeirão Preto
- Microregion: Jaboticabal

Government
  - Mayor: José Carlos Hori

Area
  - Total: 707 km^{2} (273 sq mi)
- Elevation: 605 m (1,985 ft)

Population (2020)
  - Total: 77,652
  - Density: 110/km^{2} (284/sq mi)
- Time zone: UTC-03:00 (BRT)
  - Summer (DST): UTC-02:00 (BRST)
- Website: Official website

Jaboticabal is a municipality in the state of São Paulo in Brazil. The population is 77,652 (2020 est.) in an area of 707 km^{2}. The town takes its name from the jabuticaba tree. The municipality is formed by the headquarters and the districts of Córrego Rico and Lusitânia.

Jaboticabal is home to the UNESP university campus, and is also the city that produces the most peanuts in Brazil. Around the city are extensive sugar cane plantations and industries making Jaboticabal one of the most important cities in agrobusiness around its region.

== Economy ==
The municipality is located in one of the richest regions in São Paulo State, SE Brasil, responsible for approximately 8.5% of its gross domestic product (GDP).

== Geography ==
=== Climate ===
Climate data for Jaboticabal, elevation 595 m (1,952 ft), (1981–2010 normals, extremes 1980–2000)
Month	Jan	Feb	Mar	Apr	May	Jun	Jul	Aug	Sep	Oct	Nov	Dec	Year
Record high °C (°F)	35.6 (96.1)	35.4 (95.7)	34.9 (94.8)	35.0 (95.0)	31.8 (89.2)	31.0 (87.8)	32.3 (90.1)	35.4 (95.7)	38.5 (101.3)	38.4 (101.1)	38.5 (101.3)	35.9 (96.6)	38.5 (101.3)
Mean daily maximum °C (°F)	30.1 (86.2)	30.7 (87.3)	30.2 (86.4)	29.2 (84.6)	27.0 (80.6)	26.0 (78.8)	26.8 (80.2)	28.8 (83.8)	30.0 (86.0)	30.8 (87.4)	30.8 (87.4)	30.1 (86.2)	29.2 (84.6)
Daily mean °C (°F)	24.3 (75.7)	24.3 (75.7)	23.9 (75.0)	22.6 (72.7)	20.1 (68.2)	18.6 (65.5)	18.8 (65.8)	20.7 (69.3)	22.3 (72.1)	23.8 (74.8)	24.2 (75.6)	24.1 (75.4)	22.3 (72.1)
Mean daily minimum °C (°F)	20.0 (68.0)	19.9 (67.8)	19.3 (66.7)	17.5 (63.5)	14.9 (58.8)	13.0 (55.4)	12.8 (55.0)	14.1 (57.4)	16.2 (61.2)	17.9 (64.2)	18.9 (66.0)	19.6 (67.3)	17.0 (62.6)
Record low °C (°F)	15.2 (59.4)	15.3 (59.5)	11.0 (51.8)	6.2 (43.2)	3.6 (38.5)	2.2 (36.0)	0.1 (32.2)	3.6 (38.5)	6.8 (44.2)	10.0 (50.0)	11.0 (51.8)	14.2 (57.6)	0.1 (32.2)
Average precipitation mm (inches)	262.1 (10.32)	210.1 (8.27)	176.3 (6.94)	79.8 (3.14)	57.8 (2.28)	28.8 (1.13)	16.8 (0.66)	29.2 (1.15)	58.1 (2.29)	133.8 (5.27)	160.7 (6.33)	230.8 (9.09)	1,444.3 (56.86)
Average precipitation days (≥ 1.0 mm)	17	13	12	7	5	3	2	3	6	9	10	15	102
Average relative humidity (%)	79.1	77.3	76.9	73.0	71.7	67.4	59.5	53.8	57.2	63.6	67.0	75.8	68.5
Mean monthly sunshine hours	190.5	183.9	204.1	229.8	224.5	218.8	248.5	242.9	198.3	217.0	220.7	189.9	2,568.9
Source: Instituto Nacional de Meteorologia

== Media ==
In telecommunications, the city was served by Companhia Telefônica Brasileira until 1973, when it began to be served by Telecomunicações de São Paulo. In July 1998, this company was acquired by Telefónica, which adopted the Vivo brand in 2012.

The company is currently an operator of cell phones, fixed lines, internet (fiber optics/4G) and television (satellite and cable).

== Religion ==
Christianity is present in the city as follows:

=== Catholic Church ===
The Catholic church in the municipality is part of the Roman Catholic Diocese of Jaboticabal.

=== Protestant Church ===
The most diverse evangelical beliefs are present in the city, mainly Pentecostal, including the Assemblies of God in Brazil (the largest evangelical church in the country), Christian Congregation in Brazil, among others. These denominations are growing more and more throughout Brazil.

== See also ==
- List of municipalities in São Paulo
- Interior of São Paulo
