= Itápolis =

- Municipality
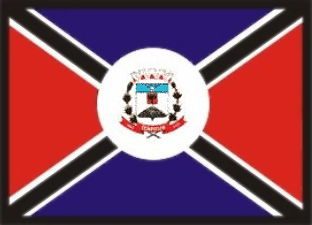
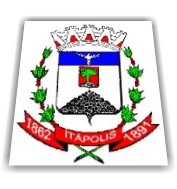
- Flag Coat of arms

- Location in São Paulo state

- Location in Brazil
- Coordinates: 21°35′45″S 48°48′46″W
- Country: Brazil
- Region: Southeast
- State: São Paulo
- Mesoregion: Araraquara
- Microregion: Araraquara

Government
  - Mayor: Edmir Gonçalves

Area
  - Total: 997 km^{2} (385 sq mi)
- Elevation: 481 m (1,578 ft)

Population (2020)
  - Total: 43,331
  - Density: 43.5/km^{2} (113/sq mi)
- Time zone: UTC−3 (BRT)
- Website: Official website

Itápolis is a municipality in the state of São Paulo in Brazil. The population is 43,331 (2020 est.) in an area of 997 km^{2} (385 sq mi).

== Media ==
In telecommunications, the city was served by Companhia Telefônica Brasileira until 1973, when it began to be served by Telecomunicações de São Paulo. In July 1998, this company was acquired by Telefónica, which adopted the Vivo brand in 2012.

The company is currently an operator of cell phones, fixed lines, internet (fiber optics/4G) and television (satellite and cable).

== Sports ==
Oeste was the city's football (soccer) team, until they moved to Barueri in 2017. The club played their home matches at Estádio dos Amaros, which has a maximum capacity of 16,143 people.

== Twin towns ==
- Pomezia, Italy

== See also ==
- List of municipalities in São Paulo
- Interior of São Paulo
