= Campeonato Paulista Segunda Divisão =

Level of Brazilian State football championships

- Organising body: FPF
- Founded: 1978; 48 years ago
- Country: Brazil
- State: (São Paulo (state)) São Paulo
- Level on pyramid: 5
- Promotion to: Série A4
- Current champions: Independente (1st title) (2026)
- Most championships: 16 teams (1 title each)
- Website: FPF Official website

Campeonato Paulista Segunda Divisão is the fifth tier of the professional state football league in the Brazilian state of São Paulo. It is run by the São Paulo State Football Federation (FPF).

== List of champions ==
Year	Edition	Champion	City	Runners-up	City
1978	1	Cruzeiro	Cruzeiro	Saltense	Salto
1979	2	Bragantino	Bragança Paulista	Jalesense	Jales
1994	3	Orlândia	Orlândia	XV de Caraguatatuba	Caraguatatuba
1995	4	São Joaquim	São Joaquim da Barra	Aparecida	Aparecida
1996	5	Valinhos	Valinhos	Aparecida	Aparecida
1997	6	Oeste	Itápolis	Palestra	São Bernardo do Campo
1998	7	Guapira	São Paulo	Osan	Indaiatuba
1999	8	Flamengo	Guarulhos	Lençoense	Lençóis Paulista
2000	9	ECO	Osasco	Palmeiras B	São Paulo
2001	10	Primavera	Indaiatuba	Rio Claro	Rio Claro
2002	11	ECUS	Suzano	Capivariano	Capivari
2003	12	Jalesense	Jales	Grêmio Barueri	Barueri
2004	13	Taboão da Serra	Taboão da Serra	Itararé	Itararé
2024	14	Paulista	Jundiaí	Colorado	Caieiras
2025	15	Tanabi	Tanabi	ECUS	Suzano
2026	16	Independente	Limeira	América	São José do Rio Preto

League names

- Campeonato Paulista Terceira Divisão (1978–79)
- Campeonato Paulista Série B2 (1994–95)
- Campeonato Paulista Série B1-B (1996–99)
- Campeonato Paulista Série B2 (2000–2004)
- Campeonato Paulista Segunda Divisão (2024–)

== Top scorers ==
Season	Top scorer	Club	Goals
2024	Vinicius Tomé	Paulista	9
2025	Maçola	Tanabi	12
2026	Hiago	Independente	11
2026	Kauã Santana	Matonense	11

== See also ==
- Campeonato Paulista
- Campeonato Paulista Série A2
- Campeonato Paulista Série A3
- Campeonato Paulista Série A4
- Campeonato Paulista Série B3
- Federação Paulista de Futebol
