= 2026 CA Juventus season =

Juventus 2026 football season

Juventus-SP
2026 season
- CEO: Claudio Roberto Fiorito Filho
- Manager: Thiago Carvalho (from 11 January 2026)
- Stadium: Rua Javari
- Série A2: Winners
- Copa Paulista: Quarterfinals
- Top goalscorer: League: Paulinho; Elkin Muñoz; Romário; Edinho; All: Paulinho (10)
Home colours	Away colours

The 2026 season is the 96th season in the history of Clube Atlético Juventus. It covers the period from January 2026 to December 2026. The Série A2 campaign began in the first half of January, with matches against Santo André on the 11th.

== Squad ==
As of 23 July 2026

Note: Flags indicate national team as defined under FIFA eligibility rules; some limited exceptions apply. Players may hold more than one non-FIFA nationality.

No.	Pos.	Nation	Player
1	GK	BRA	Gabriel Felix
2	DF	BRA	Daniel Guedes
3	DF	BRA	Vitor Graziani
4	DF	BRA	Fernando Fonseca
5	MF	BRA	Madison
6	DF	BRA	Eduardo Silva
7	FW	BRA	Paulinho
8	MF	BRA	John Egito
10	MF	BRA	Edinho
11	FW	BRA	Joãozinho
11	FW	BRA	Felipe Augusto
13	FW	ECU	Elkin Muñoz
14	MF	CHI	Fabián Espinoza
14	MF	BRA	Rodriguinho
15	DF	BRA	Lucas Justen (on loan from Fluminense)
16	DF	BRA	Matheus Leal
17	DF	BRA	Léo Coelho
18	MF	BRA	Henrique Miranda

No.	Pos.	Nation	Player
19	FW	BRA	Romário
-	FW	BRA	Luan Andrey
21	DF	BRA	Lucas Lopes
22	MF	BRA	Victor Lustosa
23	DF	BRA	Marcelo
25	GK	BRA	Lucas Passarelli
27	DF	BRA	Khendran
28	DF	BRA	Luiz Gustavo
30	FW	BRA	Maycon Douglas
31	MF	BRA	Keven
32	DF	BRA	Thomás Kayck
33	MF	BRA	Ferreira
34	DF	BRA	Felipe Silva
35	MF	BRA	Freitas (on loan from Fluminense)
39	FW	BRA	Gabriel Santiago (on loan from SSA)
77	FW	BRA	Vinicius Spaniol
99	FW	BRA	Andrew
-	FW	BRA	Vitinho

== Transfers ==
=== Transfers in ===
#	Position:	Player	Transferred from	Fee	Date	Team	Source
39	FW	(Brazil) Lucas Lopes	(Brazil) Joinville	Undisclosed	12 March 2026	First team	
11	FW	(Brazil) Joãozinho	(Brazil) Vila Nova	Undisclosed	12 March 2026	First team	
19	FW	(Brazil) Romário	(Brazil) Itabirito	Free transfer	18 February 2026	First team	
99	FW	(Brazil) Andrew	(Brazil) Caxias	Undisclosed	18 February 2026	First team	
77	FW	(Brazil) Vinicius Spaniol	(Brazil) Anápolis	Undisclosed	18 February 2026	First team	
22	MF	(Brazil) Lustosa	(Brazil) Goiás	Undisclosed	1 January 2026	First team	
28	DF	(Brazil) Vitor Graziani	(Brazil) Vila Nova	Undisclosed	6 January 2026	First team	
23	DF	(Brazil) Marcelo	(Brazil) Barra-SC	Free transfer	1 January 2026	First team	
23	MF	(Brazil) Keven	(Brazil) Pouso Alegre	Free agent	5 January 2026	First team	
9	FW	(Brazil) Daniel Cruz	(Brazil) Athletico Paranaense	Free agent	1 January 2026	First team	
7	FW	(Brazil) Paulinho	(Brazil) Barra-SC	Undisclosed	5 January 2026	First team	
28	DF	(Brazil) Luiz Gustavo	(Brazil) CSA	Undisclosed	6 January 2026	First team	
5	MF	(Brazil) Madison	(Brazil) Remo	Free transfer	6 January 2026	First team	
6	DF	(Brazil) Eduardo	(Brazil) Joinville	Undisclosed	5 January 2026	First team	
10	MF	(Brazil) Edinho	(Brazil) Rio Branco-ES	Undisclosed	5 January 2026	First team	
13	FW	(Ecuador) Elkin Muñoz	(Ecuador) Emelec	Free transfer	5 January 2026	First team	
11	FW	(Brazil) Gabriel Canela	(Brazil) Londrina	Free agent	20 February 2026	First team	
14	MF	(Chile) Fabián Espinoza	(Chile) Temuco	Free transfer	1 January 2026	First team	
33	MF	(Brazil) Ferreira	(Brazil) América-RN	Undisclosed	5 January 2026	First team	
8	MF	(Brazil) John Egito	(Brazil) Noroeste	Undisclosed	5 January 2026	First team	
25	GK	(Brazil) Lucas Passarelli	(Brazil) FC Cascavel	Undisclosed	5 January 2026	First team	
4	DF	(Brazil) Fernando	(Brazil) Tombense	Free transfer	5 January 2026	First team	
16	DF	(Brazil) Matheus Leal	(Brazil) Londrina	Free transfer	5 January 2026	First team	
30	FW	(Brazil) Maycon Douglas	(Brazil) Retrô	Undisclosed	5 January 2026	First team	
1	GK	(Brazil) Gabriel Felix	(Brazil) CSA	Undisclosed	5 January 2026	First team	
1	DF	(Brazil) Daniel Guedes	(Brazil) Paraná Clube	Free agent	5 January 2026	First team	
32	DF	(Brazil) Thomás Kayck	(Brazil) Floresta	Undisclosed	5 January 2026	First team	
14	MF	(Brazil) Rodriguinho	(Brazil) Capital CF	Undisclosed	22 July 2026	First team	
11	MF	(Brazil) Felipe Augusto	(Brazil) Operário Ferroviário	Undisclosed	24 July 2026	First team	
17	DF	(Brazil) Léo Coelho	(Brazil) Amazonas	Free Agent	1 August 2026	First team	

=== Transfers out ===
#	Position	Player	Transferred to	Fee	Date	Team	Source
9	FW	(Brazil) Daniel Cruz	(Brazil) Paraná Clube	Free transfer	15 April 2026	First team	
11	FW	(Brazil) Gabriel Canela	(Brazil) Velo Clube	Free transfer	20 February 2026	First team	
10	MF	(Brazil) Rafael Costa	(Brazil) União São João	Free agent	21 March 2026	First team	
8	MF	(Brazil) Marcelinho	(Brazil) Piauí EC	Free transfer	1 January 2026	First team	
19	FW	(Brazil) Luan Andrey	(Moldova) FC Zimbru	Loan cancelled (Note: Luan Andrey da Silva Duarte was on loan since December 2025 until March 2026)	2 March 2026	First team	
14	MF	(Chile) Fabián Espinoza	(Chile) Deportes Puerto Montt	Undisclosed	12 June 2026	First team	
5	MF	(Brazil) Madison	(Brazil) Confiança	Undisclosed	10 July 2026	First team	
11	FW	(Brazil) Joãozinho		Free agent	10 July 2026	First team	
23	DF	(Brazil) Marcelo		Free agent	31 July 2026	First team	
22	MF	(Brazil) Victor Lustosa	(Brazil) Grêmio Anápolis	Free agent	4 August 2026	First team	
28	DF	(Brazil) Luiz Gustavo	(Brazil) Nação Esportes	Free agent	4 August 2026	First team	

=== Loans in ===
#	Position	Player	Loaned from	Date	Loan expires	Team	Source
19	FW	(Brazil) Luan Andrey	(Brazil) Vila Nova	18 December 2025	2 March 2026	First team	
19	FW	(Brazil) Gabriel Santiago	(Brazil) SSA FC	11 March 2026	9 June 2026	First team	
15	DF	(Brazil) Lucas Justen	(Brazil) Fluminense FC	17 July 2026	31 December 2026	First team	
35	MF	(Brazil) Freitas	(Brazil) Fluminense FC	17 July 2026	31 December 2026	First team	

=== Loans out ===
#	Position	Player	Loaned from	Date	Loan expires	Team	Source
24	FW	(Brazil) Gabriel Santiago	(Brazil) SSA FC	10 June 2026	9 June 2026	First team	

== Squad statistics ==
As of 22 September 2026

No.	Pos.	Name	Campeonato Paulista Série A2		Copa Paulista		Total		Discipline	
No.	Pos.	Name	Apps	Goals	Apps	Goals	Apps	Goals	Yellow card	Red card
1	GK	(Brazil) Gabriel Felix	8	0	1	0	9	0	1	0
2	DF	(Brazil) Daniel Guedes	0	0	5	0	5	0	0	0
3	DF	(Brazil) Vitor Graziani	8	0	7	0	15	0	4	0
4	DF	(Brazil) Fernando	23	0	4	0	27	0	6	0
5	MF	(Brazil) Madison	21	1	0	0	21	1	7	0
6	DF	(Brazil) Eduardo	21	0	6	0	27	0	2	1
7	FW	(Brazil) Paulinho	24	5	7	5	31	10	10	0
8	MF	(Brazil) John Egito	22	0	7	0	29	0	4	0
10	MF	(Brazil) Edinho	24	3	7	0	31	3	8	1
11	FW	(Brazil) Felipe Augusto	0	0	6	3	6	3	1	0
13	FW	(Ecuador) Elkin Muñoz	23	8	6	1	29	9	6	0
14	MF	(Brazil) Rodriguinho	0	0	6	0	6	0	1	0
15	DF	(Brazil) Lucas Justen	0	0	3	0	3	0	1	0
16	DF	(Brazil) Matheus Leal	20	0	7	0	27	0	4	0
17	DF	(Brazil) Léo Coelho	0	0	3	0	3	0	1	0
18	MF	(Brazil) Henrique Miranda	4	0	1	0	5	0	1	0
19	MF	(Brazil) Romário	12	4	8	0	20	4	2	1
21	DF	(Brazil) Lucas Lopes	7	0	7	0	14	0	7	2
25	GK	(Brazil) Lucas Passarelli	18	0	7	0	25	0	1	0
27	GK	(Brazil) Khendran	0	0	0	0	0	0	0	0
30	FW	(Brazil) Maycon Douglas	8	3	0	0	8	3	1	0
31	MF	(Brazil) Keven	19	0	5	1	24	1	3	0
32	DF	(Brazil) Thomás Kayck	19	2	6	0	25	2	3	0
33	MF	(Brazil) Ferreira	22	1	2	0	24	1	8	1
34	MF	(Brazil) Felipe Silva	1	0	0	0	1	0	0	0
35	MF	(Brazil) Freitas	0	0	5	0	5	0	0	0
77	FW	(Brazil) Vinicius Spaniol	13	2	4	0	17	2	0	1
99	FW	(Brazil) Andrew	11	0	2	0	13	0	1	1
-	MF	(Brazil) João Emanoel	0	0	0	0	0	0	0	0
-	FW	(Brazil) Vitinho	0	0	1	0	1	0	0	0
Players transferred out during the season
23	DF	(Brazil) Marcelo	19	1	0	0	19	1	3	1
28	DF	(Brazil) Luiz Gustavo	15	0	0	0	15	0	4	0
22	MF	(Brazil) Victor Lustosa	6	0	0	0	6	0	1	0
9	FW	(Brazil) Daniel Cruz	5	0	0	0	5	0	0	0
19	FW	(Brazil) Luan Andrey	5	1	0	0	5	1	0	0
19	FW	(Brazil) Gabriel Canela	8	0	0	0	8	0	1	0
-	DF	(Brazil) Hebert	0	0	0	0	0	0	0	0
-	MF	(Brazil) Marcelinho	0	0	0	0	0	0	0	0
-	FW	(Brazil) Anderson Magrão	0	0	0	0	0	0	0	0
11	FW	(Brazil) Joãozinho	2	0	0	0	2	0	0	0
39	FW	(Brazil) Gabriel Santiago	10	1	0	0	10	1	0	0
14	MF	(Chile) Fabián Espinoza	0	0	0	0	0	0	0	0

=== Goals ===
As of 22 August 2026

Rank	Player	A2	CP	Total
1	(Brazil) Paulinho	5	5	10
2	(Ecuador) Elkin Muñoz	8	1	9
3	(Brazil) Romário	4	0	4
3	(Brazil) Edinho	3	1	4
5	(Brazil) Maycon Douglas	3	0	3
5	(Brazil) Felipe Augusto	0	3	3
6	(Brazil) Vinicius Spaniol	2	0	2
6	(Brazil) Thomás Kayck	2	0	2
9	(Brazil) Luan Andrey	1	0	1
9	(Brazil) Gabriel Santiago	1	0	1
9	(Brazil) Madison	1	0	1
9	(Brazil) Marcelo	1	0	1
9	(Brazil) Ferreira	1	0	1
9	(Brazil) Keven	0	1	1
Own goals		1	1	2
Total		33	12	45

=== Assists ===
As of 22 August 2026

Rank	Player	A2	CP	Total
1	(Brazil) Paulinho	4	1	5
2	(Brazil) Eduardo	3	0	3
2	(Brazil) Edinho	2	1	3
5	(Brazil) Freitas	0	2	2
4	(Ecuador) Elkin Muñoz	1	0	1
4	(Brazil) Luan Andrey	1	0	1
4	(Brazil) Ferreira	1	0	1
4	(Brazil) Henrique Miranda	1	0	1
4	(Brazil) Gabriel Canela	1	0	1
4	(Brazil) John Egito	1	0	1
4	(Brazil) Fernando	1	0	1
4	(Brazil) Passarelli	0	1	1
Total		16	5	21

=== Overall record ===
Competition	First match	Last match	Starting round	Final position	Record							
Competition	First match	Last match	Starting round	Final position	Pld	W	D	L	GF	GA	GD	Win %
Série A2	11 January 2026	13 May 2026	League phase	Winners	25	12	7	6	33	26	+7	48.00
Copa Paulista	19 July 2026	21 September 2026	Matchday 1	Quarterfinals	8	3	2	3	12	7	+5	37.50
Total					33	15	9	9	45	33	+12	45.45

Source: Competitions

=== Campeonato Paulista Série A2 ===
==== Results summary ====
Overall								Home						Away					
Pld	W	D	L	GF	GA	GD	Pts	W	D	L	GF	GA	GD	W	D	L	GF	GA	GD
25	12	7	6	33	26	+7	43	6	5	1	19	12	+7	6	2	5	14	14	0

Last updated: 22 May 2026.
Source: FPF

==== Matches ====
===== League first phase table =====
11 January 2026 1	Juventus-SP	3–3	Santo André	São Paulo
10:00 UTC−3	Luan Andrey 43'; Paulinho 77'; Thomás Kayck 90+2'	Report	Elvis 32'; Rafael Tanque 45+5'; Juan Kelsen 54'	Stadium: Rua Javari; Attendance: 2,953; Referee: Guilherme Nunes

14 January 2026 2	Ferroviária	5–1	Juventus-SP	Araraquara
20:00 UTC−3	Fábio Soares 4'; Thiago Montelo 9'; Lucas Rodrigues 69'; Albano 78'; Eduardo Soares 48' (o.g.)	Report	Maycon Douglas 54'	Stadium: Fonte Luminosa; Attendance: 516; Referee: Caio Carvalho Pereira

17 January 2026 3	São José-SP	0–1	Juventus-SP	São José dos Campos
19:00 UTC−3		Report	Elkin Muñoz 6'	Stadium: Estádio Martins Pereira; Attendance: 2,150; Referee: Salim Fende

21 January 2026 4	Juventus-SP	3–2	Taubaté	São Paulo
15:00 UTC−3	Paulinho 19' 36'; Ferreira 83'	Report	Eduardo Diniz 5'; Macário 46'	Stadium: Rua Javari; Attendance: 775; Referee: Guilherme Francisco

24 January 2026 5	Grêmio Prudente	1–2	Juventus-SP	Presidente Prudente
18:00 UTC−3	Everton Kanela 21'	Report	Maycon Douglas 16'; Madison 52'	Stadium: Prudentão; Attendance: 1,088; Referee: Juliano José

28 January 2026 6	Juventus-SP	1–1	Ituano	São Paulo
15:00 UTC−3	Carlão 90+2' (o.g.)	Report	Carlão 66'	Stadium: Rua Javari; Attendance: 782; Referee: Fagson Junior

1 February 2026 7	Osasco Sporting	0–0	Juventus-SP	Osasco
16:00 UTC−3		Report		Stadium: Pref. José Liberatti; Attendance: 198; Referee: Gustavo Alencar

7 February 2026 8	Água Santa	2–1	Juventus-SP	Diadema
16:00 UTC−3	Alisson 30'; Levi 83'	Report	Maycon Douglas 42'	Stadium: Arena Inamar; Attendance: 3,507; Referee: Salim Fende

11 February 2026 9	Juventus-SP	2–2	Linense	São Paulo
15:00 UTC−3	Elkin Muñoz 1' 45+2'	Report	Deivid 37'; Vinícius Alves 64'	Stadium: Rua Javari; Attendance: 568; Referee: Guilherme Francisco

14 February 2026 10	Juventus-SP	0–1	Votuporanguense	São Paulo
15:00 UTC−3		Report	Fernandinho 45+3'	Stadium: Rua Javari; Attendance: 1,444; Referee: Lucas Canetto

18 February 2026 11	Sertãozinho	1–0	Juventus-SP	Sertãozinho
19:00 UTC−3	Marco Gabriel 60'	Report		Stadium: Frederico Dalmaso; Attendance: 709; Referee: Guilherme Nunes

22 February 2026 12	Juventus-SP	0–0	São Bento	São Paulo
10:00 UTC−3		Report		Stadium: Rua Javari; Attendance: 2,590; Referee: Gustavo Holanda

25 February 2026 13	Monte Azul	1–3	Juventus-SP	Monte Azul Paulista
15:00 UTC−3	Luan Silva 42'	Report	Vinicius Spaniol 1' 58'; Paulinho 45+3'	Stadium: Ninho do Azulão; Attendance: 241; Referee: Marianna Nanni

1 March 2026 14	Juventus-SP	3–0	XV Piracicaba	São Paulo
10:00 UTC−3	Marcelo 49'; Elkin Muñoz 52'; Romário 87'	Report		Stadium: Rua Javari; Attendance: 3,659; Referee: Murilo Tarrega

7 March 2026 15	Inter de Limeira	1–2	Juventus-SP	Limeira
15:00 UTC−3	Zé Eduardo 6'	Report	Romário 64'; Edinho 66'	Stadium: Major José Levy Sobrinho; Attendance: 666; Referee: Fabiano Monteiro

===== League second phase table =====
15 March 2026 16	Juventus-SP	2–1	Ferroviária	São Paulo
10:00 UTC−3	Elkin Muñoz 3'; Gabriel Santiago 46'	Report	Douglas Skilo 6'	Stadium: Rua Javari; Attendance: 2,923; Referee: Douglas Flores

18 March 2026 17	São José-SP	1–0	Juventus-SP	São José dos Campos
20:00 UTC−3	Clessione 2'	Report		Stadium: Estádio Martins Pereira; Attendance: 4,509; Referee: Marcio Mattos

22 March 2026 18	Juventus-SP	2–1	Sertãozinho	São Paulo
10:00 UTC−3	Elkin Muñoz 19' (pen.); Paulinho 80'	Report	Jefinho 44'	Stadium: Rua Javari; Attendance: 2,821; Referee: Murilo Tarrega

28 March 2026 19	Sertãozinho	0–2	Juventus-SP	Sertãozinho
19:30 UTC−3		Report	Edinho 78' 90+8' (pen.)	Stadium: Frederico Dalmaso; Attendance: 1,113; Referee: Guilherme Nunes

11 April 2026 20	Juventus-SP	1–0	São José-SP	São Paulo
15:00 UTC−3	Romário 34'	Report		Stadium: Rua Javari; Attendance: 3,614; Referee: Matheus Candançan

15 April 2026 21	Ferroviária	1–0	Juventus-SP	Araraquara
19:00 UTC−3	Vitor Barreto 82'	Report		Stadium: Fonte Luminosa; Attendance: 1,579; Referee: Daiane Muniz

=== Bracket ===
Semifinals
Juventus-SP	2	0	2
Votuporanguense	1	0	1
Ituano	0	1	1
Ferroviária	1	1	2

Finals
Juventus-SP	0	1	1
Ferroviária	0	2	2

==== Knockout stages ====
21 April 2026 Semifinal	Juventus-SP	2–1	Votuporanguense	São Paulo
10:00 UTC−3	Elkin Muñoz 58'; Romário 81'	Report	Marcos Nunes 47'	Stadium: Rua Javari; Attendance: 3,729; Referee: Douglas Flores

28 April 2026 Semifinal	Votuporanguense	0–0	Juventus-SP	Votuporanga
20:00 UTC−3		Report		Stadium: Plínio Marin; Attendance: 7,323; Referee: Flavio Rodrigues

7 May 2026 Final	Juventus-SP	0–0	Ferroviária	São Paulo
10:00 UTC−3		Report		Stadium: Rua Javari; Attendance: 3,382; Referee: Daiane Muniz

13 May 2026 Final	Ferroviária	1–2	Juventus-SP	Araraquara
19:15 UTC−3	Vitor Barreto 82'	Report	Elkin Muñoz 4'; Thomás Kayck 90+2'	Stadium: Fonte Luminosa; Attendance: 8,622; Referee: Edina Alves Batista

=== Copa Paulista ===
==== Group stage ====
19 July 2026 1	Osasco Sporting	0–1	Juventus-SP	Osasco
11:00 UTC−3		Report	Paulinho 49'	Stadium: Municipal José Liberatti; Attendance: 295; Referee: Henrique Hengstmam

26 July 2026 2	Juventus-SP	3-1	Paulista	São Paulo
10:00 UTC−3	Keven 56'; Matheus 90' (o.g.); Paulinho 90+2'	Report	Luis Gustavo 45+1'	Stadium: Mercado Livre Arena Pacaembu; Attendance: 2,597; Referee: Gabriel Bispo
Note:

2 August 2026 3	Juventus-SP	0-1	Primavera	Barueri
16:00 UTC−3		Report	Kauan 71'	Stadium: Arena Barueri; Attendance: 606; Referee: Danilo Ricardo Salgado

8 August 2026 4	Primavera	2-2	Juventus-SP	Indaiatuba
17:00 UTC−3	Marco Antônio 63' 75'	Report	Felipe Augusto 30'; Elkin Muñoz 37'	Stadium: Ítalo Mário Limongi; Attendance: 2,330; Referee: Gustavo Rodrigues

16 August 2026 5	Paulista	1-0	Juventus-SP	Jundiaí
15:00 UTC−3	Luis 35'	Report		Stadium: Jayme Cintra; Attendance: 1,325; Referee: Lucas Bellote

22 August 2026 6	Juventus-SP	5-0	Osasco Sporting	Barueri
15:00 UTC−3	Felipe Augusto 06'; Edinho 55'; Paulinho 35', 65', 72'	Report		Stadium: Arena Barueri; Attendance: 765; Referee: Salim Fende Chavez

== Group 3 ==
Pos	Team	Pld	W	D	L	GF	GA	GD	Pts
1	Juventus-SP	6	3	1	2	11	5	+6	10
2	Primavera	6	3	1	2	8	6	+2	10
3	Paulista	6	3	1	2	6	7	−1	10
4	Osasco Sporting	6	1	1	4	4	11	−7	4

Updated to match(es) played on 22 August 2026. Source: FPF

=== Knockout stages ===
12 September 2026 Quarterfinals	União São João	1-0	Juventus-SP	Araras
17:00 UTC−3	Alex 81'	Report		Stadium: Estádio Hermínio Ometto; Attendance: 484; Referee: Fabiano Monteiro dos Santos

21 September 2026 Quarterfinals	Juventus-SP	1-1	União São João	São Paulo
20:30 UTC−3	Felipe Augusto 8'	Report	Alex 66'	Stadium: Mercado Livre Arena Pacaembu; Attendance: 2,488; Referee: Edina Alves Batista
