= Khendran =

Brazilian footballer

Personal information
- Full name: Khendran Andryel Tomaz Santos
- Date of birth: 5 May 2005 (age 21)
- Place of birth: Goiatuba, Brazil
- Height: 1.87 m (6 ft 2 in)
- Position: Goalkeeper

Team information
- Current team: Juventus-SP
- Number: 27

Youth career
- 2021–2024: Fortaleza
- 2024–2025: Goiás
- 2025: Brasiliense
- 2025–2026: Juventus-SP

Senior career*
Years	Team	Apps	(Gls)
2026–	Juventus-SP	0	(0)
- * Club domestic league appearances and goals as of 05:16, 22 April 2026 (UTC)

Khendran Andryel Tomaz Santos (born 5 May 2005), simply known as Khendran, is a Brazilian footballer who plays as a goalkeeper for Clube Atlético Juventus.

== Career ==
Born in Goiatuba, Goiás, Khendran joined Fortaleza's youth sides in August 2021. On 30 March 2022, he signed his first professional contract until June 2024, and further extended his link until December 2025 on 13 December of that year.

On 16 February 2024, after losing space in the under-20 team, Khendran moved to Goiás for the same category. In May 2025, he was announced at Brasiliense's under-20 team, before moving to Juventus-SP shortly after.

In January 2026, Khendran was promoted to the first team after the 2026 Copa São Paulo de Futebol Júnior, initially as a third-choice behind Lucas Passarelli and Gabriel Felix.

== Career statistics ==
As of match played 22 April 2026

Appearances and goals by club, season and competition
Club	Season	League			State League		Cup		Continental		Other		Total	
Club	Season	Division	Apps	Goals	Apps	Goals	Apps	Goals	Apps	Goals	Apps	Goals	Apps	Goals
Juventus-SP	2026	Paulista A2	—		0	0	—		—		—		0	0
Career total			0	0	0	0	0	0	0	0	0	0	0	0

== Honours ==
Juventus-SP

- Campeonato Paulista Série A2: 2026
