= Joãozinho (footballer, born 1993) =

Brazilian footballer (born 1993)

Personal information
- Full name: João Victor Amaral dos Santos Silva
- Date of birth: 8 May 1993 (age 33)
- Place of birth: Campinas, Brazil
- Height: 1.60 m (5 ft 3 in)
- Position: Winger

Youth career
- 2010–2011: Paulínia

Senior career*
Years	Team	Apps	(Gls)
2010–2011	Paulínia	11	(3)
2013	Red Bull Brasil	0	(0)
2013	→ Foz do Iguaçu (loan)		
2014	Capivariano	12	(0)
2014	Guarani	6	(0)
2015	Votuporanguense	21	(1)
2015	União Barbarense	0	(0)
2016	Penapolense	10	(2)
2017	Capivariano	9	(0)
2017	XV de Piracicaba	0	(0)
2018–2020	Leones Negros	66	(18)
2020–2021	Tlaxcala	8	(2)
2022	Joinville	3	(0)
2022	Fluminense do Itaum	8	(5)
2023	ASA	22	(5)
2023	Araguaia	22	(5)
2024	Luverdense	15	(10)
2024	Botafogo-PB	22	(7)
2025	Portuguesa-RJ	9	(1)
2025	ABC	17	(3)
2025	Maracanã	0	(0)
2026	Campinense	11	(2)
2026	Juventus-SP	2	(0)
- * Club domestic league appearances and goals as of 12 July 2026

João Victor Amaral dos Santos Silva (born 8 May 1993), commonly known as Joãozinho, is a Brazilian professional footballer who plays as a winger.

== Career ==
Born in Campinas, São Paulo, Joãozinho joined Paulínia's youth setup in 2010, and made his first team debut later in that year. In 2013, he moved to Red Bull Brasil, and served a loan stint at Foz do Iguaçu in September before joining Capivariano.

Joãozinho subsequently continued to appear in his native state, representing Guarani, Votuporanguense, União Barbarense, Penapolense, back at Capivariano and XV de Piracicaba before moving to Mexico in 2018, with Leones Negros. In 2020, he joined Tlaxcala of the Liga de Expansión MX.

On 2 December 2021, Joãozinho was announced at Joinville for the upcoming season. On 2 November of the following year, after a short stint at Fluminense do Itaum, he agreed to a deal with ASA.

On 19 October 2023, after impressing with Araguaia in the Copa FMF, Joãozinho signed for Luverdense. The following 15 April, after scoring ten goals in the Campeonato Mato-Grossense, he moved to Botafogo-PB in the Série C.

Joãozinho began the 2025 campaign at Portuguesa-RJ, before being announced at ABC on 28 February of that year. He later played for Maracanã, before reuniting with head coach Evaristo Piza at Campinense on 17 October.

On 14 March 2026, Joãozinho left Campinense to join Juventus-SP.

== Career statistics ==
As of match played 5 May 2026

Appearances and goals by club, season and competition
Club	Season	League			State League		Cup		Continental		Other		Total	
Club	Season	Division	Apps	Goals	Apps	Goals	Apps	Goals	Apps	Goals	Apps	Goals	Apps	Goals
Paulínia	2010	Paulista 2ª Divisão	—		4	2	—		—		—		4	2
Paulínia	2011	Paulista A3	—		7	1	—		—		—		7	1
Paulínia	Total		—		11	3	—		—		—		11	3
Red Bull Brasil	2013	Paulista A2	—		—		—		—		6 (Note: Appearances in Copa Paulista)	0	6	0
Capivariano	2014	Paulista A2	—		12	0	—		—		—		12	0
Guarani	2014	Série C	6	0	—		—		—		—		6	0
Votuporanguense	2015	Paulista A3	—		21	1	—		—		—		21	1
União Barbarense	2015	Paulista A2	—		—		—		—		9	5	9	5
Penapolense	2016	Paulista A2	—		10	2	—		—		—		10	2
Capivariano	2017	Paulista A2	—		9	0	—		—		—		9	0
XV de Piracicaba	2017	Série D	—		—		—		—		2	0	2	0
Leones Negros	2017–18	Ascenso MX	18	4	—		—		—		—		18	4
Leones Negros	2018–19	Ascenso MX	29	7	—		2	0	—		—		31	7
Leones Negros	2019–20	Ascenso MX	19	7	—		2	0	—		—		21	7
Leones Negros	Total		66	18	—		4	0	—		—		70	18
Tlaxcala	2020–21	Liga de Expansión MX	8	2	—		—		—		—		8	2
Joinville	2022	Catarinense	—		3	0	—		—		—		3	0
Fluminense do Itaum	2022	Catarinense Série C	—		8	5	—		—		—		8	5
ASA	2023	Série D	13	3	9	2	1	0	—		3 (Note: One appearance and one goal in Copa do Nordeste, two appearances and one goal in Copa Alagoas)	2	26	7
Araguaia	2023	Mato-Grossense 2ª Divisão	—		—		—		—		5 (Note: Appearances in Copa FMF)	1	5	1
Luverdense	2024	Mato-Grossense	—		15	10	—		—		—		15	10
Botafogo-PB	2024	Série C	22	7	—		—		—		—		22	7
Portuguesa-RJ	2025	Carioca	—		9	1	—		—		—		9	1
ABC	2025	Série C	13	2	4	0	0	0	—		—		17	2
Maracanã	2025	Série D	—		—		—		—		4 (Note: Appearances in Copa Fares Lopes)	0	4	0
Campinense	2026	Paraibano	—		11	2	—		—		—		11	2
Juventus-SP	2026	Paulista A2	—		2	0	—		—		—		2	0
Career total			128	32	124	26	5	0	0	0	40	8	286	66

== Honours ==
Capivariano

- Campeonato Paulista Série A2: 2014

Maracanã

- Copa Fares Lopes: 2025

Juventus-SP

- Campeonato Paulista Série A2: 2026
