= Luiz Gustavo (footballer, born 2003) =

Brazilian footballer (born 2003)

Personal information
- Full name: Luiz Gustavo da Silva Alves
- Date of birth: 30 May 2003 (age 23)
- Place of birth: São João Nepomuceno, Brazil
- Height: 1.93 m (6 ft 4 in)
- Position: Centre back

Team information
- Current team: Nação

Youth career
- 2018–2022: Avaí

Senior career*
Years	Team	Apps	(Gls)
2021–2022	Avaí	0	(0)
2023–2024	Nação	11	(0)
2024–2025	Atlético Goianiense	2	(0)
2025	→ Paraná (loan)	7	(0)
2025	→ CSA (loan)	6	(0)
2026	Juventus-SP	15	(0)
2026-	Nação	0	(0)
- * Club domestic league appearances and goals as of 02:25, 25 September 2026 (UTC)

Luiz Gustavo da Silva Alves (born 30 May 2003), known as Luiz Gustavo, is a Brazilian professional footballer who plays as a central defender for Nação.

== Career ==
Born in São João Nepomuceno, Minas Gerais, Luiz Gustavo was an Avaí youth graduate. After playing for the youth sides and featuring in two senior matches during the 2021 Copa Santa Catarina, he moved to Nação for the 2023 Campeonato Catarinense Série B.

On 7 May 2024, Luiz Gustavo was announced at Série A side Atlético Goianiense, after the club reached a partnership with Nação. He made his club – and division – debut on 19 June, starting in a 2–1 home loss to Criciúma.

On 3 January 2025, after being rarely used, Luiz Gustavo was loaned to Paraná for the Campeonato Paranaense. He moved to CSA also in a temporary deal on 2 April, before moving to Juventus-SP on 20 December.

== Career statistics ==
As of match played 19 September 2026

Appearances and goals by club, season and competition
Club	Season	League			State League		Cup		Continental		Other		Total	
Club	Season	Division	Apps	Goals	Apps	Goals	Apps	Goals	Apps	Goals	Apps	Goals	Apps	Goals
Avaí	2021	Série B	0	0	—		—		—		2 (Note: Appearance(s) in Copa Santa Catarina)	0	2	0
Nação	2023	Catarinense Série B	—		6	0	—		—		7	0	13	0
Nação	2024	Catarinense	—		5	0	—		—		—		5	0
Nação	Subtotal		—		11	0	—		—		7	0	18	0
Atlético Goianiense	2024	Série A	2	0	—		0	0	—		—		2	0
Paraná (loan)	2025	Paranaense	—		7	0	—		—		—		7	0
CSA (loan)	2025	Série C	6	0	—		1	0	—		1 (Note: Appearance(s) in Copa do Nordeste)	0	8	0
Juventus-SP	2026	Paulista A2	—		15	0	—		—		—		15	0
Nação	2026	Catarinense Série B	—		0	0	—		—		3	0	3	0
Career total			8	0	33	0	1	0	0	0	13	0	55	0

== Honours ==
Juventus-SP

- Campeonato Paulista Série A2: 2026
