= Henrique Miranda =

Henrique Miranda may refer to:

- Henrique Miranda (footballer, born 1993), Brazilian football left-back player
- Henrique Miranda (footballer, born 2006), Brazilian football attacking midfielder for Juventus-SP
