= John Egito =

Brazilian footballer (born 1995)

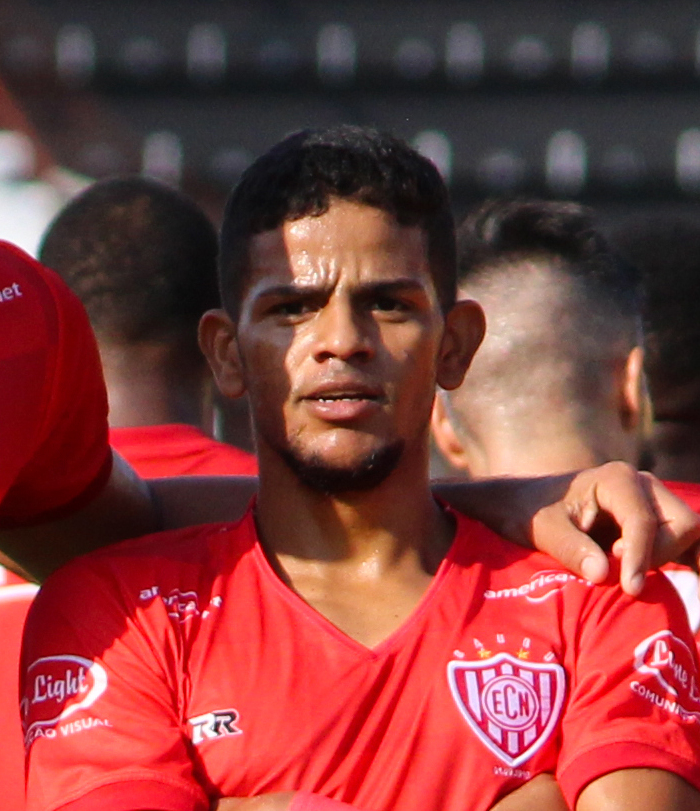
- John Egito playing for Noroeste in 2022

Personal information
- Full name: John Adams Egito da Silva
- Date of birth: 6 May 1995 (age 31)
- Place of birth: Barreiras, Brazil
- Height: 1.69 m (5 ft 7 in)
- Positions: Midfielder; winger

Team information
- Current team: Juventus-SP
- Number: 8

Senior career*
Years	Team	Apps	(Gls)
2015–2018	Osvaldo Cruz	54	(7)
2019–2024	Noroeste	83	(4)
2024–2025	Votuporanguense	13	(0)
2025	Noroeste	0	(0)
2026–	Juventus-SP	22	(0)
- * Club domestic league appearances and goals as of 13 May 2026 ‡ National team caps and goals as of 4 November 2023

John Adams Egito da Silva (born 6 May 1995), known as John Egito, is a Brazilian professional footballer who plays as either a midfielder or a winger for Juventus-SP.

== Career ==
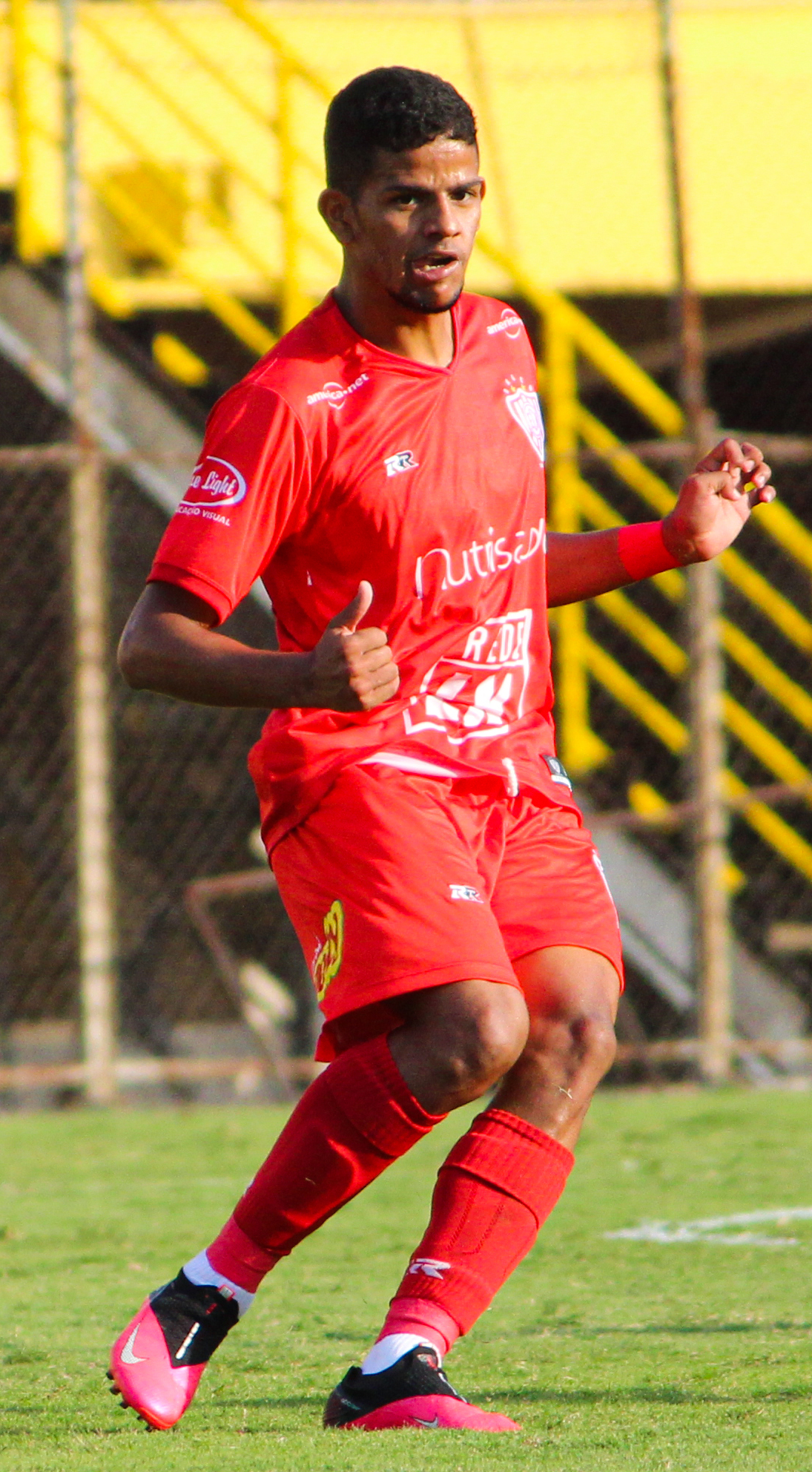
John Egito in action for Noroeste in 2022

Born in Barreiras, Bahia, John Egito joined Osvaldo Cruz in 2015, and played his first years under the nickname of Baiano. On 27 December 2018, he was presented at Noroeste for the upcoming season.

Regularly used in the following seasons, John Egito renewed his contract with Norusca until 2024 on 10 April 2023. On 10 May of the following year, he signed for Votuporanguense for the Copa Paulista.

On 11 May 2025, John Egito returned to Noroeste, also for the state cup. In December, he was announced at Juventus-SP for the upcoming season.

== Career statistics ==
As of match played 12 September 2026

Appearances and goals by club, season and competition
Club	Season	League			State League		Cup		Continental		Other		Total	
Club	Season	Division	Apps	Goals	Apps	Goals	Apps	Goals	Apps	Goals	Apps	Goals	Apps	Goals
Osvaldo Cruz	2015	Paulista 2ª Divisão	—		5	0	—		—		—		5	0
Osvaldo Cruz	2016	Paulista 2ª Divisão	—		12	3	—		—		—		12	3
Osvaldo Cruz	2017	Paulista 2ª Divisão	—		18	1	—		—		—		18	1
Osvaldo Cruz	2018	Paulista 2ª Divisão	—		19	3	—		—		—		19	3
Osvaldo Cruz	Total		—		54	7	—		—		—		54	7
Noroeste	2019	Paulista A3	—		11	0	—		—		9 (Note: Appearance(s) in Copa Paulista)	1	20	1
Noroeste	2020	Paulista A3	—		10	1	—		—		—		10	1
Noroeste	2021	Paulista A3	—		12	0	—		—		8	1	20	1
Noroeste	2022	Paulista A3	—		19	3	—		—		10	2	29	5
Noroeste	2023	Paulista A2	—		17	0	—		—		7	0	24	0
Noroeste	2024	Paulista A2	—		14	0	—		—		—		14	0
Noroeste	Total		—		83	4	—		—		34	4	117	8
Votuporanguense	2024	Paulista A2	—		—		—		—		14	1	14	1
Votuporanguense	2025	Paulista A2	—		13	0	1	0	—		—		14	0
Votuporanguense	Total		—		13	0	1	0	—		14	1	28	1
Noroeste	2025	Paulista A2	—		—		—		—		5	0	5	0
Juventus-SP	2026	Paulista A2	—		22	0	—		—		7	0	29	0
Career total			0	0	172	11	1	0	0	0	60	5	233	16

== Honours ==
Noroeste

- Campeonato Paulista Série A3: 2022

Juventus-SP

- Campeonato Paulista Série A2: 2026
