= Gabriel Felix =

Gabriel Felix may refer to:

- Gabriel Félix (footballer, born 1995), Brazilian football goalkeeper for Votuporanguense
- Gabriel Felix (footballer, born 1997), Brazilian football goalkeeper for Juventus da Mooca
