= Macario =

Macario is a Spanish, Portuguese, Italian, and Filipino name. It may refer to:

== People ==
- Macário (footballer), full name Matheus Moraes Macário de Souza, Brazilian footballer
- Catarina Macario, Brazilian-American footballer
- Erminio Macario, Italian actor and comedian
- Macario Peralta, Jr., Filipino soldier and lawyer
- Macario Sakay, Filipino general
- Mig Macario, Filipino-Canadian actor
- William Macario, Brazilian mixed martial artist

== Other ==
- Macario (film), a 1960 Mexican film

== See also ==
- Macarius, the Latin version of the name
- Makarios, the Greek version of the name
