= Thomás Kayck =

Brazilian footballer (born 1996)

Personal information
- Full name: Thomás Kayck Martins de Lima
- Date of birth: 29 January 1996 (age 30)
- Place of birth: Satuba, Brazil
- Height: 1.92 m (6 ft 4 in)
- Position: Centre-back

Team information
- Current team: Juventus-SP
- Number: 32

Youth career
- ASA
- 2015–2016: Sport Recife

Senior career*
Years	Team	Apps	(Gls)
2017	Central	14	(1)
2017	Sete de Setembro		
2018	Luverdense	1	(0)
2019	Foz do Iguaçu	12	(0)
2020	Brasiliense	0	(0)
2020	Pouso Alegre	0	(0)
2020	Afogados	6	(1)
2020–2021	São Bernardo	1	(0)
2021	Goiânia	2	(0)
2022–2024	Audax Rio	27	(0)
2022	→ Volta Redonda (loan)	36	(1)
2023	→ Ponte Preta (loan)	13	(0)
2024	→ Figueirense (loan)	15	(0)
2025	Portuguesa-RJ	7	(0)
2025	Primavera	0	(0)
2025	Floresta	22	(1)
2026–	Juventus-SP	19	(2)
- * Club domestic league appearances and goals as of 7 May 2026

Thomás Kayck Martins de Lima (born 29 January 1996), known as Thomás Kayck or just Thomás, is a Brazilian footballer who plays as a centre-back for Juventus-SP.

== Career ==
Thomás was born in Primavera, a small village in Satuba, Alagoas, and played for ASA and Sport Recife as a youth. In 2017, he moved to Central and made his senior debut with the club.

In January 2019, after representing Sete de Setembro and Luverdense, Thomás was included in the squad of Foz do Iguaçu for the season. In March 2020, after a short stint at Brasiliense, he signed for Pouso Alegre for the Campeonato Mineiro Módulo II.

In June 2020, Thomás moved to Afogados, but left the club in November after receiving an "irrefusable offer", later revealed to be from São Bernardo. He agreed to a deal with Goiânia in September 2021, before joining Audax Rio ahead of the 2022 season.

On 29 March 2022, Thomás moved to Volta Redonda on loan. Back to Audax in 2023, he joined Ponte Preta also in a temporary deal on 14 April of that year.

On 15 January 2024, Série C side Figueirense announced the signing of Thomás on a one-year loan deal He began the 2025 season at Portuguesa-RJ, and had a short stint at Primavera before signing for Floresta on 13 April.

In December 2025, Thomás was announced at Juventus-SP ahead of the ensuing campaign.

== Career statistics ==
As of match played 22 September 2026

Appearances and goals by club, season and competition
Club	Season	League			State League		Cup		Other		Total	
Club	Season	Division	Apps	Goals	Apps	Goals	Apps	Goals	Apps	Goals	Apps	Goals
Central	2017	Série D	2	0	12	1	—		—		14	1
Luverdense	2018	Série C	1	0	0	0	0	0	0	0	1	0
Foz do Iguaçu	2019	Série D	6	0	6	0	2	0	—		14	0
Brasiliense	2020	Série D	—		0	0	—		0	0	0	0
Pouso Alegre	2020	Mineiro Módulo II	—		0	0	—		—		0	0
Afogados	2020	Série D	6	1	—		—		—		6	1
São Bernardo	2020	Paulista A2	—		—		—		4 (Note: Appearances in Copa Paulista)	0	4	0
São Bernardo	2021	Paulista A2	—		1	0	—		—		1	0
São Bernardo	Total		—		1	0	—		4	0	5	0
Goiânia	2021	Goiano 2ª Divisão	—		2	0	—		—		2	0
Audax Rio	2022	Carioca	—		12	0	—		—		12	0
Audax Rio	2023	Carioca	—		15	0	—		—		15	0
Audax Rio	Total		—		27	0	—		—		27	0
Volta Redonda (loan)	2022	Série C	23	0	13	1	—		6 (Note: Appearances in Copa Rio)	1	42	2
Ponte Preta (loan)	2023	Série B	13	0	—		—		—		13	0
Figueirense (loan)	2024	Série C	8	0	7	0	—		5 (Note: Appearances in Copa Santa Catarina)	0	20	0
Portuguesa-RJ	2025	Carioca	—		7	0	1	0	—		8	0
Primavera	2025	Paulista A2	—		0	0	—		—		0	0
Floresta	2025	Série C	22	1	—		—		—		22	1
Juventus-SP	2026	Paulista A2	—		19	2	—		7	0	26	2
Career total			81	2	94	4	3	0	22	1	200	7

== Honours ==
Pouso Alegre

- Campeonato Mineiro Módulo II: 2020

São Bernardo

- Campeonato Paulista Série A2: 2021

Volta Redonda

- Campeonato Carioca Série A2: 2022
- Copa Rio: 2022

Juventus-SP

- Campeonato Paulista Série A2: 2026
