= Marcelo (footballer, born 1990) =

Brazilian footballer

Personal information
- Full name: Marcelo Henrique Ferreira
- Date of birth: 10 January 1990 (age 36)
- Place of birth: Bebedouro, Brazil
- Height: 1.80 m (5 ft 11 in)
- Position: Right-back

Youth career
- 2009: Rio Preto

Senior career*
Years	Team	Apps	(Gls)
2009–2010	Rio Preto	12	(0)
2010	Inter de Limeira	22	(1)
2011	Rio Preto	24	(2)
2011–2013	Comercial-SP	29	(1)
2013	→ Monte Azul (loan)	11	(0)
2013	→ Anapolina (loan)	18	(1)
2014	Mirassol	12	(1)
2015	Anapolina	15	(1)
2015	Vila Nova	18	(1)
2016–2017	Anápolis	43	(0)
2017	Tombense	12	(0)
2018	Macaé	16	(1)
2018	Sampaio Corrêa	5	(0)
2019	Macaé	4	(0)
2019	ASA	10	(0)
2020	Patrocinense	10	(1)
2020–2021	Pelotas	26	(3)
2021	Paysandu	15	(1)
2022–2024	Caxias	80	(8)
2022	→ Anapolina (loan)	7	(0)
2025	Barra-SC	24	(1)
2026–	Juventus-SP	19	(1)
- * Club domestic league appearances and goals as of 05:16, 7 May 2026 (UTC)

Marcelo Henrique Ferreira (born 10 January 1990), known as Marcelo Ferreira or just Marcelo, is a Brazilian footballer who plays as a right-back for Juventus-SP.

== Career ==
Born in Bebedouro, São Paulo, Marcelo began his career with Rio Preto in 2009, and subsequently played for Inter de Limeira before returning to the club in 2011. Later in that year, he moved to Comercial-SP, where he was separated from the squad in September 2012 after criticizing head coach Paulo Cezar Catanoce and the club via social media.

After serving loans at Monte Azul and Anapolina, Marcelo signed for Mirassol in December 2013. In May 2015, after a short period back at Anapolina, he joined Vila Nova, but was released in November.

Marcelo signed for Anápolis ahead of the 2016 season, and featured regularly before being released in June 2017. He moved to Tombense shortly after, before agreeing to a deal with Macaé on 28 November of that year.

On 10 April 2018, Sampaio Corrêa announced the signing of Marcelo. He returned to Macaé for the 2019 season, but ended the year at ASA.

After playing for Patrocinense and Pelotas in 2020, Marcelo joined Paysandu on 10 May 2021. On 2 December, he moved to Caxias.

Loaned back to Anapolina in September 2022, Marcelo subsequently returned to Caxias and became a regular starter until leaving in October 2024. Ahead of the 2025 campaign, he moved to Barra-SC.

In December 2025, after winning the year's Série D, Marcelo joined Juventus-SP.

== Career statistics ==
As of match played 7 May 2026

Appearances and goals by club, season and competition
Club	Season	League			State League		Cup		Continental		Other		Total	
Club	Season	Division	Apps	Goals	Apps	Goals	Apps	Goals	Apps	Goals	Apps	Goals	Apps	Goals
Rio Preto	2009	Paulista A2	—		0	0	—		—		15 (Note: Appearances in Copa Paulista)	0	15	0
Rio Preto	2010	Paulista A2	—		12	0	—		—		—		12	0
Rio Preto	Total		—		12	0	—		—		15	0	27	0
Inter de Limeira	2010	Paulista 2ª Divisão	—		22	1	—		—		—		22	1
Rio Preto	2011	Paulista A2	—		22	1	—		—		2	1	24	2
Comercial-SP	2011	Paulista A2	—		—		—		—		15	0	15	0
Comercial-SP	2012	Paulista	—		7	1	—		—		7	0	14	1
Comercial-SP	Total		—		7	1	—		—		22	0	29	1
Monte Azul (loan)	2013	Paulista A2	—		11	0	—		—		—		11	0
Anapolina (loan)	2013	Goiano 2ª Divisão	—		18	1	—		—		—		18	1
Mirassol	2014	Paulista A2	—		12	1	—		—		—		12	1
Anapolina	2015	Goiano	—		13	1	2	0	—		—		15	1
Vila Nova	2015	Série C	18	1	—		—		—		—		18	1
Anápolis	2016	Série D	8	0	17	0	—		—		—		25	0
Anápolis	2017	Série D	4	0	13	0	1	0	—		—		18	0
Anápolis	Total		12	0	30	0	1	0	—		—		43	0
Tombense	2017	Série C	12	0	—		—		—		—		12	0
Macaé	2018	Série D	—		16	1	—		—		—		16	1
Sampaio Corrêa	2018	Série B	5	0	—		—		—		—		5	0
Macaé	2019	Carioca	—		4	0	—		—		—		4	0
ASA	2019	Série D	7	0	2	0	1	0	—		—		10	0
Patrocinense	2020	Série D	—		10	1	—		—		—		10	1
Pelotas	2020	Série D	13	1	3	0	—		—		—		16	1
Pelotas	2021	Série D	—		10	2	—		—		—		10	2
Pelotas	Total		13	1	13	2	—		—		—		26	3
Paysandu	2021	Série C	14	1	—		—		—		1 (Note: Appearances in Copa Verde)	0	15	1
Caxias	2022	Série D	18	4	9	0	—		—		—		27	4
Caxias	2023	Série D	15	1	12	0	—		—		—		27	1
Caxias	2024	Série C	13	2	11	1	2	0	—		—		26	3
Caxias	Total		46	7	32	1	2	0	—		—		80	8
Anapolina (loan)	2022	Goiano 2ª Divisão	—		7	0	—		—		—		7	0
Barra-SC	2025	Série D	16	1	8	0	—		—		—		24	1
Juventus-SP	2026	Paulista A2	—		19	1	—		—		—		19	1
Career total			143	11	258	12	6	0	0	0	40	1	447	24

== Honours ==
Juventus-SP

- Campeonato Paulista Série A2: 2026
