= Luan Andrey =

Brazilian footballer (born 2006)

Personal information
- Full name: Luan Andrey da Silva Duarte
- Date of birth: August 4, 2006 (age 20)
- Place of birth: Brazil
- Height: 1.78 m (5 ft 10 in)
- Position: Forward

Team information
- Current team: Zimbru

Youth career
- 2020: Cruzeiro
- 2021-2023: Flamengo
- 2024-2025: América Mineiro
- 2025: Vila Nova

Senior career*
Years	Team	Apps	(Gls)
2025	Vila Nova	3	(0)
2026	→ Juventus-SP (loan)	5	(1)
2026–	→ Zimbru (loan)	3	(0)
- * Club domestic league appearances and goals as of 23 July 2026

Luan Andrey da Silva Duarte (born 4 August 2006), known as Luan Andrey, is a Brazilian professional footballer who plays as a forward for Moldovan club Zimbru.

== Club career ==
Luan Andrey came through the youth academies of Cruzeiro, Flamengo and América Mineiro before joining the youth setup of Vila Nova.

He made his senior debut for Vila Nova during the 2025 Série B season, appearing three times for the first team, including a start in a 2–2 draw against Volta Redonda in the 38th round.

On 17 December 2025, with no space in the first-team squad, Luan Andrey was loaned to Juventus-SP for the 2026 season. He scored his first goal for the club on 11 January 2026, equalising in a 3–3 draw against Santo André on the opening matchday of the Campeonato Paulista A2.

Luan Andrey went on to make five appearances for Juventus, scoring once and providing one assist, before his loan was cut short. On 2 March 2026, Juventus announced his transfer to Moldovan club Zimbru, with parent club Vila Nova set to receive a training-compensation fee from the move abroad.

== Honours ==
Juventus-SP

- Campeonato Paulista Série A2: 2026

== Career statistics ==
As of match played 24 July 2026

Appearances and goals by club, season and competition
Club	Season	League			State league		Cup		Continental		Other		Total	
Club	Season	Division	Apps	Goals	Apps	Goals	Apps	Goals	Apps	Goals	Apps	Goals	Apps	Goals
Vila Nova	2025	Série B	3	0	—		—		—		—		3	0
Juventus-SP (loan)	2026	Paulista A2	—		5	1	—		—		—		5	1
Zimbru (loan)	2025–26	Divizia Națională	3	0	0	0	0	0	0	0	0	0	3	0
Career total			6	0	5	1	0	0	0	0	0	0	11	1
