= Fernando Fonseca (footballer, born 1993) =

Brazilian footballer

Personal information
- Full name: Fernando Fonseca Ferreira
- Date of birth: 29 December 1993 (age 32)
- Place of birth: Roncador, Brazil
- Height: 1.90 m (6 ft 3 in)
- Position: Centre-back

Team information
- Current team: Juventus-SP
- Number: 4

Youth career
- 2011–2012: Grêmio Barueri
- 2013: Criciúma

Senior career*
Years	Team	Apps	(Gls)
2013–2014	Criciúma	0	(0)
2014	→ Moto Club (loan)	19	(1)
2015	Luverdense	0	(0)
2015–2016	Deportivo Tepic	18	(1)
2017	Moto Club	3	(0)
2018	Itumbiara	13	(0)
2019–2020	Boa Esporte	30	(1)
2020–2021	Joinville	37	(2)
2022	Brasil de Pelotas	8	(0)
2022	→ FC Cascavel (loan)	14	(0)
2022	Figueirense	4	(0)
2023	Caxias	29	(0)
2024	Ypiranga-RS	26	(1)
2025	Floresta	8	(0)
2025	Tombense	8	(0)
2026–	Juventus-SP	23	(0)
- * Club domestic league appearances and goals as of 13 May 2026

Fernando Fonseca Ferreira (born 29 December 1993), also known as Fernando Fonseca or simply Fernando, is a Brazilian professional footballer who plays as a centre-back for Juventus-SP.

== Career ==
Born in Roncador, Paraná, Fernando played for the youth sides of Grêmio Barueri before joining Criciúma's under-20 team in 2013. On 17 February 2014, he was loaned to Moto Club for the remainder of the Campeonato Maranhense.

In 2015, Fernando had a brief spell at Luverdense before moving to Deportivo Tepic of the Ascenso MX. He returned to his home country in December 2016, signing a contract with Moto.

On 13 December 2017, Fernando agreed to a deal with Itumbiara. He moved to Boa Esporte for the 2019 season, where he was regularly used.

On 16 September 2020, after losing his starting spot, Fernando was announced at Joinville, helping the club to win the year's Copa Santa Catarina and the 2021 Recopa Catarinense. He moved to Brasil de Pelotas ahead of the 2022 campaign, before being loaned out to FC Cascavel in April of that year.

On 3 August 2022, Figueirense announced the signing of Fernando for the remainder of the year. On 28 November of that year, he was presented at Caxias, where he was a first-choice as the club finished second in the 2023 Campeonato Gaúcho and achieved promotion in the 2023 Série D.

On 30 October 2023, Fernando signed with Ypiranga-RS. On 4 January 2025, after another season as a starter, he was announced by fellow Série C side Floresta, but after featuring sparingly, he moved to fellow league team Tombense in April.

On 2 December 2025, Fernando was announced at Juventus-SP.

== Career statistics ==
As of match played 16 August 2026

Appearances and goals by club, season and competition
Club	Season	League			State League		Cup (Note: Includes Copa do Brasil, Copa MX)		Continental		Other		Total	
Club	Season	Division	Apps	Goals	Apps	Goals	Apps	Goals	Apps	Goals	Apps	Goals	Apps	Goals
Criciúma	2013	Série A	0	0	—		—		—		—		0	0
Moto Club (loan)	2014	Série D	8	1	11	0	—		—		—		19	1
Luverdense	2015	Série B	0	0	0	0	0	0	—		1 (Note: Appearance(s) in Copa Verde)	0	1	0
Deportivo Tepic	2015–16	Ascenso MX	18	0	—		7	1	—		—		25	1
Moto Club	2017	Série C	0	0	3	0	1	0	—		2 (Note: Appearance(s) in Copa do Nordeste)	0	6	0
Itumbiara	2018	Série D	0	0	13	0	—		—		—		13	0
Boa Esporte	2019	Série C	13	0	13	1	1	0	—		—		27	1
Boa Esporte	2020	Série C	—		4	0	0	0	—		—		4	0
Boa Esporte	Total		13	0	17	1	1	0	—		—		31	1
Joinville	2020	Série D	9	0	—		—		—		7 (Note: Appearance(s) in Copa Santa Catarina)	0	16	0
Joinville	2021	Série D	17	2	11	0	2	0	—		5 (Note: One appearance in Recopa Catarinense, four appearances in Copa Santa Catarina)	0	35	2
Joinville	Total		26	2	11	0	2	0	—		12	0	51	2
Brasil de Pelotas	2022	Série C	—		8	0	0	0	—		—		8	0
FC Cascavel (loan)	2022	Série D	14	0	—		—		—		—		14	0
Figueirense	2022	Série C	4	0	—		—		—		2	0	6	0
Caxias	2023	Série D	17	0	12	0	—		—		—		29	0
Ypiranga-RS	2024	Série C	20	1	6	0	4	1	—		2 (Note: Appearance(s) in Copa FGF)	0	32	2
Floresta-CE	2025	Série C	—		8	0	—		—		—		8	0
Tombense	2025	Série C	8	0	—		—		—		—		8	0
Juventus-SP	2026	Paulista A2	—		23	0	—		—		4 (Note: Appearances in Copa Paulista)	0	27	0
Career total			128	4	112	1	15	2	0	0	23	0	278	7

== Honours ==
Joinville

- Copa Santa Catarina: 2020
- Recopa Catarinense: 2021

Juventus-SP

- Campeonato Paulista Série A2: 2026

Individual

- Campeonato Paulista Série A2 Team of the Season: 2026
