= Vinicius Spaniol =

Brazilian footballer (born 2001)

Personal information
- Date of birth: 22 March 2001 (age 25)
- Place of birth: Ivoti, Brazil
- Height: 1.88 m (6 ft 2 in)
- Position: Forward

Team information
- Current team: Juventus-SP
- Number: 77

Youth career
- 2016–2021: Ivoti
- 2018: → Paraná (loan)

Senior career*
Years	Team	Apps	(Gls)
2022	Inter de Santa Maria	11	(2)
2022	→ Pelotas (loan)	0	(0)
2023–2024	Caxias	8	(0)
2023	→ Mineiros (loan)	5	(1)
2024	Aimoré	4	(0)
2025	São Caetano	13	(4)
2025	Passo Fundo	15	(10)
2025–2026	Anápolis	13	(1)
2026–	Juventus-SP	13	(2)
- * Club domestic league appearances and goals as of 7 May 2026

Vinicius Spaniol (born 22 March 2001) is a Brazilian professional footballer who plays as a forward for Juventus-SP.

== Career ==
Born in Ivoti, Rio Grande do Sul, Spaniol represented the youth sides of Associação Sport Club Ivoti and Paraná Clube. He made his senior debut with Internacional de Santa Maria in 2022, and signed for Caxias on 13 December of that year, after a short period at Pelotas.

Rarely used, Spaniol was loaned to Mineiros in September 2023. Back to Caxias for the 2024 season, he was again a backup option, and terminated his contract with the club in June.

On 23 June 2024, Spaniol signed for Aimoré. He began the 2025 season at São Caetano, before returning to his native state with Passo Fundo on 14 April of that year.

On 9 August 2025, after being the top scorer of the Campeonato Gaúcho Série A2 with ten goals, Spaniol was announced at Série C side Anápolis. He left the side the following 18 February, after receiving an offer from Juventus-SP.

== Career statistics ==
As of match played 22 September 2026

Appearances and goals by club, season and competition
Club	Season	League			State League		Cup		Continental		Other		Total	
Club	Season	Division	Apps	Goals	Apps	Goals	Apps	Goals	Apps	Goals	Apps	Goals	Apps	Goals
Inter de Santa Maria	2022	Gaúcho Série A2	—		11	2	—		—		—		11	2
Pelotas (loan)	2022	Gaúcho Série A2	—		—		—		—		7 (Note: Appearances in Copa FGF)	5	7	5
Caxias	2023	Série D	1	0	3	0	—		—		—		4	0
Caxias	2024	Série C	2	0	2	0	0	0	—		—		4	0
Caxias	Total		3	0	5	0	0	0	—		—		8	0
Mineiros (loan)	2023	Goiano 3ª Divisão	—		5	1	—		—		—		5	1
Aimoré	2024	Gaúcho Série A2	—		4	0	—		—		8	2	12	2
São Caetano	2025	Série A4	—		13	4	—		—		—		13	4
Passo Fundo	2025	Gaúcho Série A2	—		15	10	—		—		—		15	10
Anápolis	2025	Série C	4	0	—		—		—		—		4	0
Anápolis	2026	Série C	—		9	1	0	0	—		0	0	9	1
Anápolis	Total		4	0	9	1	0	0	—		0	0	13	1
Juventus-SP	2026	Paulista A2	—		12	2	—		—		4 (Note: Appearances in Copa Paulista)	0	16	2
Career total			7	0	74	20	0	0	0	0	19	7	100	27

== Honours ==
Juventus-SP

- Campeonato Paulista Série A2: 2026
