= Romário (footballer, born 1999) =

Brazilian footballer (born 1999)

Personal information
- Full name: Romário Simões de Oliveira Santos
- Date of birth: 2 June 1999 (age 27)
- Place of birth: Cantagalo, Brazil
- Height: 1.82 m (6 ft 0 in)
- Position: Forward

Team information
- Current team: Juventus-SP
- Number: 19

Youth career
- 2017–2018: Serrano-RJ
- 2018–2019: Volta Redonda

Senior career*
Years	Team	Apps	(Gls)
2018	Serrano-RJ	7	(2)
2019	Serrano-RJ	17	(3)
2020	Boa Esporte	9	(1)
2021	Estrela do Norte	8	(1)
2021–2022	Nova Mutum	17	(4)
2022	Paraná	3	(0)
2022	Penapolense	4	(0)
2022	Nova Mutum	0	(0)
2023	Taubaté	6	(0)
2023	Glória	13	(5)
2023	Nova Mutum	0	(0)
2024	Itabuna	9	(2)
2024	Princesa do Solimões	13	(3)
2025	ABECAT	10	(1)
2025	Veranópolis	17	(5)
2025	Serrano-RJ	10	(1)
2026	Itabirito	8	(4)
2026–	Juventus-SP	12	(4)
- * Club domestic league appearances and goals as of 13 May 2026

Romário Simões de Oliveira Santos (born 2 June 1999), simply known as Romário, is a Brazilian professional footballer who plays as a forward for Juventus-SP.

== Career ==
Born in Cantagalo, Rio de Janeiro, Romário began his career with Serrano-RJ, where he impressed in the 2018 Campeonato Carioca Série B1. On 18 September 2018, he moved to Volta Redonda after the club reached a partnership with Serrano, but returned to his previous club in the following year.

On 3 December 2019, Romário signed for Boa Esporte. In June 2021, after a short period at Estrela do Norte, he moved to Nova Mutum.

On 18 February 2022, Romário joined Paraná, and played for Penapolense before returning to Nova Mutum later in that year. On 2 December 2022, he was announced at Taubaté for the upcoming season.

In August 2023, after a period at Glória, Romário returned to Nova Mutum for a third spell. In the 2024 season, he represented Itabuna and Princesa do Solimões.

In April 2025, after representing ABECAT, Romário agreed to a deal with Veranópolis. He then returned to his first club Serrano, and played in the 2026 Campeonato Mineiro for Itabirito.

On 21 February 2026, Juventus-SP announced the signing of Romário.

== Career statistics ==
As of match played 22 September 2026

Appearances and goals by club, season and competition
Club	Season	League			State League		Cup		Continental		Other		Total	
Club	Season	Division	Apps	Goals	Apps	Goals	Apps	Goals	Apps	Goals	Apps	Goals	Apps	Goals
Serrano-RJ	2018	Carioca Série B1	—		7	2	—		—		—		7	2
Serrano-RJ	2019	Carioca Série B1	—		17	3	—		—		—		17	3
Boa Esporte	2020	Série C	1	0	7	1	1	0	—		—		9	1
Estrela do Norte	2021	Capixaba	—		8	1	—		—		—		8	1
Nova Mutum	2021	Série D	9	2	—		—		—		12 (Note: Six appearances in Copa FMF, six appearances and four goals in Copa Verde)	4	21	6
Nova Mutum	2022	Mato-Grossense	—		8	2	—		—		8 (Note: Appearances in Copa FMF)	1	16	3
Nova Mutum	Total		9	2	8	2	—		—		20	5	37	9
Paraná	2022	Série D	—		3	0	1	0	—		—		4	0
Penapolense	2022	Paulista 2ª Divisão	—		4	0	—		—		—		4	0
Taubaté	2023	Paulista A2	—		6	0	—		—		—		6	0
Glória	2023	Gaúcho Série A2	—		13	5	—		—		—		13	5
Nova Mutum	2023	Mato-Grossense	—		—		—		—		8	3	8	3
Itabuna	2024	Baiano	—		9	2	1	0	—		—		10	2
Princesa do Solimões	2024	Série D	13	3	—		—		—		—		13	3
ABECAT	2025	Goiano	—		10	1	—		—		—		10	1
Veranópolis	2025	Gaúcho Série A2	—		17	5	—		—		—		17	5
Serrano-RJ	2025	Carioca Série B1	—		13	1	—		—		—		13	1
Itabirito	2026	Mineiro	—		8	4	—		—		—		8	4
Juventus-SP	2026	Paulista A2	—		12	4	—		—		8 (Note: Appearance(s) in Copa Paulista)	0	20	4
Career total			23	5	142	31	3	0	0	0	36	8	204	44

== Honours ==
Nova Mutum

- Copa FMF: 2022

Serrano-RJ

- Campeonato Carioca Série B1: 2025

Juventus-SP

- Campeonato Paulista Série A2: 2026
