= Elkin Muñoz =

Ecuadorian footballer (born 2005)

Personal information
- Full name: Elkin Israel Muñoz Calderón
- Date of birth: 29 June 2005 (age 21)
- Place of birth: Guayaquil, Ecuador
- Height: 1.69 m (5 ft 7 in)
- Positions: Attacking midfielder; winger

Team information
- Current team: Juventus-SP
- Number: 13

Youth career
- 2023–2024: Emelec

Senior career*
Years	Team	Apps	(Gls)
2024–2025	Emelec	30	(1)
2026–	Juventus-SP	23	(8)

International career^{‡}
2024–2025	Ecuador U20	3	(0)
- * Club domestic league appearances and goals as of 13 May 2026 ‡ National team caps and goals as of 4 May 2026

Elkin Israel Muñoz Calderón (born 4 May 2005) is an Ecuadorian professional footballer who plays as either an attacking midfielder or a winger for Brazilian club Juventus-SP.

== Club career ==
=== Emelec ===
Born in Guayaquil, Muñoz joined Emelec's youth setup in 2023. Promoted to the first team in the following year, he made his senior – and Ecuadorian Serie A – debut on 4 August 2024, coming on as a late substitute for Ronny Borja in a 1–0 home loss to Deportivo Cuenca.

In October 2025, despite being regularly used in the first team, Muñoz left Emelec amidst the club's financial problems.

=== Juventus-SP ===
On 5 December 2025, Brazilian club Juventus-SP announced the signing of Muñoz for the upcoming Campeonato Paulista Série A2. He scored his first professional goal on his second match for the club, netting the winner in a 1–0 away success over São José-SP.

== International career ==
In January 2025, Muñoz was called up to the Ecuador national under-20 team for the 2025 South American U-20 Championship. He featured in two matches during the competition, as his side was eliminated in the first stage.

== Career statistics ==
As of match played 22 September 2026

Appearances and goals by club, season and competition
Club	Season	League			Cup		Continental		State League		Other		Total	
Club	Season	Division	Apps	Goals	Apps	Goals	Apps	Goals	Apps	Goals	Apps	Goals	Apps	Goals
Emelec	2024	LigaPro Serie A	14	0	1	0	—		—		—		15	0
Emelec	2025	LigaPro Serie A	16	0	1	0	—		—		—		17	0
Emelec	Total		30	0	2	0	—		—		—		32	0
Juventus-SP	2026	Paulista A2	—		—		—		23	8	6 (Note: Appearances in Copa Paulista)	1	29	9
Career total			30	0	2	0	0	0	23	8	6	1	61	9

== Honours ==
Juventus-SP

- Campeonato Paulista Série A2: 2026

Individual

- Campeonato Paulista Série A2 Young Player of the Season: 2026
- Campeonato Paulista Série A2 Team of the Season: 2026
