= Gabriel Santiago =

Brazilian footballer (born 2000)

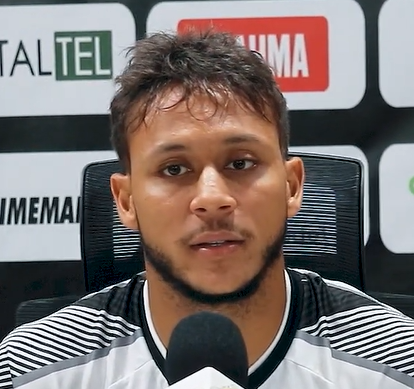
- Santiago in 2024

Personal information
- Full name: Gabriel Santiago Oliveira
- Date of birth: 5 February 2000 (age 26)
- Place of birth: Salvador, Brazil
- Height: 1.70 m (5 ft 7 in)
- Position: Winger

Team information
- Current team: Inter de Limeira
- Number: 27

Youth career
- 2015–2020: Vitória

Senior career*
| Years | Team | Apps | (Gls) |
| 2020–2024 | Vitória | 27 | (1) |
| 2023 | → Náutico (loan) | 20 | (4) |
| 2023–2024 | → Ponte Preta (loan) | 4 | (0) |
| 2024 | → ABC (loan) | 13 | (1) |
| 2025 | Figueirense | 26 | (4) |
| 2026 | North | 7 | (0) |
| 2026 | SSA | 0 | (0) |
| 2026 | → Juventus-SP (loan) | 10 | (1) |
| 2026– | Inter de Limeira | 5 | (0) |
- * Club domestic league appearances and goals as of 9 November 2026

Gabriel Santiago Oliveira (born 5 February 2000), known as Gabriel Santiago, is a Brazilian professional footballer who plays as a winger for Inter de Limeira.

== Career ==
Born in Salvador, Bahia, Santiago joined Vitória's youth setup in 2015, aged 15. He made his first team debut on 22 January 2020, starting in a 1–0 Campeonato Baiano home win over Jacobina.

In March 2021, Santiago suffered a knee injury in a match against rivals Bahia, being sidelined until November. The club still renewed his contract until 2024 shortly after the confirmation of his injury.

Rarely used afterwards, Santiago was loaned to Náutico on 28 November 2022. The following 4 September, he moved to Ponte Preta also in a temporary deal.

Despite being rarely used, Santiago's loan with Ponte was renewed for a further year on 31 December 2023, but he was again a backup option and moved to ABC the following 15 April. He returned to Vitória in September 2024 after his loan ended, but did not make an appearance for the side.

On 13 December 2024, Figueirense announced the signing of Santiago for the upcoming season. Roughly one year later, he moved to North, and played in the 2026 Campeonato Mineiro before signing for Juventus-SP on 13 March of that year.

== Career statistics ==
As of match played 13 May 2026

Appearances and goals by club, season and competition
| Club | Season | League | | | State League | | Cup | | Continental | | Other | | Total | |
| Club | Season | Division | Apps | Goals | Apps | Goals | Apps | Goals | Apps | Goals | Apps | Goals | Apps | Goals |
|---|---|---|---|---|---|---|---|---|---|---|---|---|---|---|
| Vitória | 2020 | Série B | 1 | 0 | 3 | 0 | 0 | 0 | — | | 0 | 0 | 4 | 0 |
| Vitória | 2021 | Série B | 0 | 0 | 2 | 0 | 1 | 0 | — | | 1 (Note: Appearances in Copa do Nordeste) | 0 | 4 | 0 |
| Vitória | 2022 | Série C | 13 | 1 | 8 | 0 | 2 | 0 | — | | 0 | 0 | 23 | 1 |
| Vitória | Total | | 14 | 1 | 13 | 0 | 3 | 0 | — | | 1 | 0 | 31 | 1 |
| Náutico (loan) | 2023 | Série C | 16 | 2 | 4 | 2 | 2 | 1 | — | | 4 | 0 | 26 | 5 |
| Ponte Preta (loan) | 2023 | Série B | 2 | 0 | — | | — | | — | | — | | 2 | 0 |
| Ponte Preta (loan) | 2024 | Série B | 0 | 0 | 2 | 0 | — | | — | | — | | 2 | 0 |
| Ponte Preta (loan) | Total | | 2 | 0 | 2 | 0 | — | | — | | — | | 4 | 0 |
| ABC (loan) | 2024 | Série C | 13 | 1 | — | | — | | — | | — | | 13 | 1 |
| Figueirense | 2025 | Série C | 17 | 1 | 9 | 3 | — | | — | | 2 (Note: Appearances in Copa Santa Catarina) | 0 | 28 | 4 |
| North | 2026 | Mineiro | — | | 7 | 0 | — | | — | | — | | 7 | 0 |
| Juventus-SP | 2026 | Paulista A2 | — | | 10 | 1 | — | | — | | — | | 10 | 1 |
| Career total | | | 62 | 5 | 45 | 6 | 5 | 1 | 0 | 0 | 7 | 0 | 119 | 12 |

== Honours ==
Figueirense

- Copa Santa Catarina: 2025

Juventus-SP

- Campeonato Paulista Série A2: 2026
