= Vitor Graziani =

Brazilian footballer (born 2004)

Personal information
- Full name: Vitor Hugo Santos Graziani
- Date of birth: 17 May 2004 (age 22)
- Place of birth: Goiânia, Brazil
- Height: 1.83 m (6 ft 0 in)
- Position: Centre-back

Team information
- Current team: Juventus-SP
- Number: 28

Youth career
- 2019–2020: Athletico Paranaense
- 2021–2025: Vila Nova
- 2022–2024: → Atlético Mineiro (loan)

Senior career*
Years	Team	Apps	(Gls)
2022–2025	Vila Nova	8	(0)
2025	→ Goiânia (loan)	6	(0)
2026–	Juventus-SP	8	(0)
- * Club domestic league appearances and goals as of 4 May 2026

Vitor Hugo Santos Graziani (born 7 May 2004), known as Vitor Graziani, is a Brazilian professional footballer who plays for Juventus-SP. Mainly a centre-back, he can also play as a defensive midfielder.

== Career ==
Born in Goiânia, Goiás, Graziani joined Athletico Paranaense's youth setup in 2019, before moving to Vila Nova in 2021. In 2022, he stood out for the latter team in the Copa São Paulo de Futebol Júnior, and made his debut with the main squad on 10 February of that year, starting in a 5–0 Campeonato Goiano home routing of Iporá.

In May 2022, Graziani was loaned to Atlético Mineiro and returned to the under-20 team. He renewed his contract with Vila in August 2023, before returning to his parent club in February 2024, after his loan ended.

On 22 January 2025, Graziani was loaned to Goiânia until the end of the Campeonato Goiano. His loan was extended for the 2025 Série D on 12 March.

On 7 January 2026, Graziani was announced at Juventus-SP.

== Career statistics ==
As of match played 12 September 2026

Appearances and goals by club, season and competition
Club	Season	League			State League		Cup		Continental		Other		Total	
Club	Season	Division	Apps	Goals	Apps	Goals	Apps	Goals	Apps	Goals	Apps	Goals	Apps	Goals
Vila Nova	2022	Série B	—		4	0	0	0	—		—		4	0
Vila Nova	2024	Série B	3	0	1	0	—		—		3 (Note: Appearance(s) in Copa Verde)	0	7	0
Vila Nova	Total		3	0	5	0	0	0	—		3	0	11	0
Goiânia (loan)	2025	Série D	5	0	1	0	—		—		—		6	0
Juventus-SP	2026	Paulista A2	—		8	0	—		—		7 (Note: Appearances in Copa Paulista)	0	15	0
Career total			8	0	14	0	0	0	0	0	10	0	32	0

== Honours ==
Juventus-SP

- Campeonato Paulista Série A2: 2026
