= Madison (footballer) =

Brazilian footballer (born 1998)

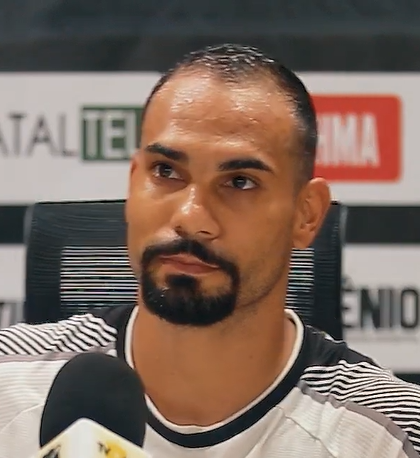
- Madison in 2025

Personal information
- Full name: Madison Araújo Costa
- Date of birth: 8 July 1998 (age 28)
- Place of birth: Caldas Novas, Brazil
- Height: 1.78 m (5 ft 10 in)
- Position: Defensive midfielder

Team information
- Current team: Confiança

Youth career
- 2013: Caldas
- 2014: Ferroviária
- 2015: Caldas
- 2016–2018: Goiás

Senior career*
Years	Team	Apps	(Gls)
2018–2021	Goiás	30	(2)
2019	→ Novorizontino (loan)	1	(0)
2019	→ Senica (loan)	0	(0)
2020–2021	→ Confiança (loan)	28	(1)
2021	Confiança	22	(1)
2022	Guarani	34	(1)
2023	Portuguesa	11	(1)
2023–2024	Brusque	55	(2)
2025	ABC	9	(2)
2025	Remo	2	(0)
2026	Juventus-SP	21	(1)
2026–	Confiança	6	(0)

International career^{‡}
2017	Brazil (University)	5	(0)
- * Club domestic league appearances and goals as of 11 November 2026 ‡ National team caps and goals as of 29 December 2019

Madison Araújo Costa (born 8 July 1998), simply known as Madison, is a Brazilian footballer who plays as a defensive midfielder for Confiança.

== Career ==
Born in Caldas Novas, Goiás, Madison began his career with hometown side Caldas, and finished his formation with Goiás. He made his first team debut with the latter on 28 January 2018, starting in a 3–0 Campeonato Goiano away win over Itumbiara.

In March 2018, after becoming a regular starter, Madison renewed his contract with the Esmeraldino until 2022. He scored his first senior goal on 18 May, in a 1–1 home draw against Guarani, but subsequently lost space after the arrival of new head coach Ney Franco.

On 2 February 2019, Madison joined Novorizontino on loan. After just one match, he moved to Slovak side Senica also in a temporary deal in July, before returning to Brazil with Confiança in March 2020, also on loan.

Back to Goiás for the 2021 season, Madison returned to Confiança on a permanent deal on 20 July of that year. On 23 December, he was announced at Guarani.

On 2 December 2022, Portuguesa announced the signing of Madison for the 2023 Campeonato Paulista. He moved to Brusque the following 20 April, and established himself as a regular starter for the club.

On 24 December 2024, Madison agreed to a one-year deal with ABC. He moved to Remo on 11 April 2025, featuring rarely as the club achieved promotion to the Série A.

On 29 December 2025, Madison joined Juventus-SP for the upcoming season.

== Career statistics ==
As of 13 May 2026.

Club	Season	League			State League		Cup		Continental		Other		Total	
Club	Season	Division	Apps	Goals	Apps	Goals	Apps	Goals	Apps	Goals	Apps	Goals	Apps	Goals
Goiás	2018	Série B	7	1	9	0	5	0	—		—		21	1
Goiás	2019	Série A	0	0	0	0	0	0	—		—		0	0
Goiás	2020	Série B	0	0	1	0	0	0	—		—		1	0
Goiás	2021	Série B	2	0	11	1	1	0	—		—		14	1
Goiás	Total		9	1	21	1	6	0	—		—		36	2
Novorizontino (loan)	2019	Série D	0	0	1	0	0	0	—		—		1	0
Senica (loan)	2019–20	Fortuna liga	0	0	—		1	0	—		—		1	0
Confiança (loan)	2020	Série B	24	1	4	0	0	0	—		1 (Note: Appearance(s) in Copa do Nordeste)	0	29	1
Confiança	2021	Série B	22	1	—		—		—		1	0	23	1
Guarani	2022	Série B	26	1	8	0	2	0	—		—		36	1
Portuguesa	2023	Paulista	—		11	1	—		—		—		11	1
Brusque	2023	Série C	26	2	—		—		—		—		26	2
Brusque	2024	Série B	15	0	14	0	2	0	—		—		31	0
Brusque	Total		41	2	14	0	2	0	—		—		57	2
ABC	2025	Série C	—		9	2	1	0	0	0	1	0	11	2
Remo	2025	Série B	2	0	—		—		—		—		2	0
Juventus-SP	2026	Série A2	—		21	1	—		—		—		21	1
Confiança	2026	Série C	2	0	0	0	0	0	0	0	0	0	2	0
Career total			126	6	89	5	12	0	0	0	3	0	229	10

== Honours ==
Goiás

- Campeonato Goiano: 2018

Confiança

- Campeonato Sergipano: 2020

Juventus-SP

- Campeonato Paulista Série A2: 2026
