= Eduardo Soares (footballer, born 2000) =

Brazilian professional footballer

Personal information
- Full name: Eduardo da Silva Soares
- Date of birth: 16 October 2000 (age 26)
- Place of birth: Naviraí, Brazil
- Height: 1.78 m (5 ft 10 in)
- Position: Left-back

Team information
- Current team: Juventus-SP
- Number: 6

Youth career
- 2017–2020: Guarulhos
- 2018: → Internacional (loan)
- 2020: → Santa Cruz (loan)

Senior career*
Years	Team	Apps	(Gls)
2019–2025	Guarulhos	0	(0)
2021	→ Santa Cruz (loan)	11	(4)
2022	→ FC Cascavel (loan)	8	(4)
2023	→ CRAC (loan)	24	(1)
2024	→ Confiança (loan)	18	(0)
2025	→ CRAC (loan)	8	(0)
2025	→ Central (loan)	17	(0)
2025	Joinville	0	(0)
2026–	Juventus-SP	21	(0)
- * Club domestic league appearances and goals as of 13 May 2026

Eduardo da Silva Soares (born 16 October 2000), known as Eduardo Soares or just Eduardo, is a Brazilian professional footballer who plays as a left-back for Juventus-SP.

== Career ==
Born in Naviraí, Mato Grosso do Sul, Eduardo joined Guarulhos's youth setup in 2017. In 2018, he was loaned to Internacional, playing for their under-20 and under-23 teams before returning to his parent club in 2019, and being again loaned out to Santa Cruz later in that year.

Eduardo subsequently served loans at FC Cascavel, CRAC (two stints), Confiança and Central. On 24 September 2025, he signed a permanent deal with Joinville for the Copa Santa Catarina.

On 12 December 2025, Eduardo was announced at Juventus-SP for the upcoming season.

== Career statistics ==
As of match played 22 September 2026

Appearances and goals by club, season and competition
Club	Season	League			State League		Cup		Continental		Other		Total	
Club	Season	Division	Apps	Goals	Apps	Goals	Apps	Goals	Apps	Goals	Apps	Goals	Apps	Goals
Internacional	2018	Série A	0	0	—		0	0	—		4 (Note: Appearances in Copa FGF)	0	4	0
Santa Cruz	2021	Série C	6	1	7	3	2	0	—		6 (Note: Appearance(s) in Copa do Nordeste)	0	21	4
FC Cascavel	2022	Série D	5	0	3	0	0	0	—		—		8	0
CRAC	2023	Série D	12	0	12	1	—		—		—		24	1
Confiança	2024	Série C	10	0	8	0	0	0	—		0	0	18	0
CRAC	2025	Goiano	—		8	0	—		—		—		8	0
Central	2025	Série D	17	0	—		—		—		—		17	0
Joinville	2025	Série D	—		—		—		—		8 (Note: Appearances in Copa Santa Catarina)	1	8	1
Juventus-SP	2026	Paulista A2	—		21	0	—		—		6 (Note: Appearances in Copa Paulista)	0	27	0
Career total			50	1	59	4	2	0	0	0	24	1	135	6

== Honours ==
Confiança

- Campeonato Sergipano: 2024

Juventus-SP

- Campeonato Paulista Série A2: 2026
