= Canela (footballer) =

Brazilian footballer (born 2000)

Personal information
- Full name: Gabriel Luiz Sandes Gomes
- Date of birth: 22 January 2000 (age 26)
- Place of birth: Duque de Caxias, Brazil
- Height: 1.74 m (5 ft 9 in)
- Position: Winger

Team information
- Current team: Velo Clue

Youth career
- 2018: Boavista-RJ
- 2018: Artsul
- 2019-2020: Nova Iguaçu

Senior career*
Years	Team	Apps	(Gls)
2018	Artsul	2	(0)
2019–2023	Nova Iguaçu	62	(7)
2020	→ Zulte Waregem (loan)	0	(0)
2021	→ Sampaio Corrêa-RJ (loan)	10	(1)
2022	→ Serrano (loan)	11	(2)
2023	→ Artsul (loan)	13	(0)
2023	Serrano	8	(1)
2024	Bangu	8	(1)
2024	Serrano	17	(2)
2025	Linense	11	(1)
2025	Londrina	12	(0)
2026	Juventus-SP	8	(0)
2026-	Velo Clue	0	(0)
- * Club domestic league appearances and goals as of 14:44, 31 July 2026 (UTC)

Gabriel Luiz Sandes Gomes (born 22 January 2000), commonly known as Canela or Gabriel Canela, is a Brazilian professional footballer who plays as a forward for Bangu.

== Early life ==
Canela grew up in the Corte 8 community of Duque de Caxias, Rio de Janeiro, and received his nickname Canela (Cinnamon) from his cousin when he was a child.

== Club career ==
He first took an interest in football at a local football school named Centenário Esporte Clube, run by coach Bárbara Almeida, in Duque de Caxias. He went on to join professional side Artsul in nearby Nova Iguaçu, where he made his debut in the 2018 edition of the Campeonato Carioca Série A2.

The following year, he joined Nova Iguaçu, spending his first season with the club in the youth ranks, before marking his debut for the club with two goals and an assist in a 4–0 Campeonato Carioca win over America-RJ on 11 January 2020. Later in the same year, he trialled with Belgian club Zulte Waregem, and went on to join the Jupiler Pro League side on a six-month loan deal at the end of January 2020.

On his return to Brazil, he featured in twenty games for Nova Iguaçu in the Campeonato Carioca Série A2, scoring twice during the COVID-19 pandemic-struck season in Brazil, helping the team return to the top-flight Campeonato Carioca. The following year, after featuring regularly for Nova Iguaçu in the Campeonato Carioca, he was loaned to Sampaio Corrêa-RJ in May 2021.

After another half-season with Nova Iguaçu, including seven appearances in the Campeonato Brasileiro Série D, Canela was again loaned out, this time to Serrano, in August 2022. The following year, having begun the season with parent side Nova Iguaçu, and spending time on loan with former club Artsul, Canela returned to Serrano on a permanent basis in August 2023, signing a deal until December 2025. He scored his first goal for the club since his return on 8 October, in a 3–0 win against Nova Cidade, thanking coach Jordi Blanco for giving him a chance after what he described as a "difficult and insecure time" for himself.

Despite signing a long-term contract, Canela left Serrano at the end of 2023, and went on to join Bangu in January 2024. He scored his first goal for the club in a 2–2 draw with Vasco da Gama on 28 January 2024.

== Career statistics ==
=== Club ===
As of match played 11 February 2026

Appearances and goals by club, season and competition
Club	Season	League			State League		Cup		Other		Total	
Club	Season	Division	Apps	Goals	Apps	Goals	Apps	Goals	Apps	Goals	Apps	Goals
Artsul	2018	–			2 (Note: Appearances in the Campeonato Carioca Série A2)	0	0	0	0	0	2	0
Nova Iguaçu	2019	–			0	0	0	0	0	0	0	0
Nova Iguaçu	2020	–			23 (Note: Three appearances and two goals in the Campeonato Carioca, twenty appearances and two goals in the Campeonato Carioca Série A2)	4	0	0	0	0	23	4
Nova Iguaçu	2021	–			19 (Note: Appearances in the Campeonato Carioca)	1	0	0	0	0	19	1
Nova Iguaçu	2022	Série D	7	1	7	0	0	0	0	0	14	1
Nova Iguaçu	2023	Série D	0	0	6	1	1 (Note: Appearances in the Copa do Brasil)	0	0	0	7	1
Nova Iguaçu	Total		7	1	55	6	1	0	0	0	63	7
Zulte Waregem (loan)	2019–20	Jupiler Pro League	0	0	–		0	0	0	0	0	0
Sampaio Corrêa-RJ (loan)	2021	–			10	1	0	0	4 (Note: Appearances in the Copa Rio)	0	14	1
Serrano (loan)	2022	–			11 (Note: Appearances in the Campeonato Carioca Série B1)	2	0	0	0	0	11	2
Artsul (loan)	2023	–			13	0	0	0	0	0	13	0
Serrano	2023	–			8	1	0	0	6	0	14	1
Bangu	2024	–			8	1	0	0	0	0	8	1
Serrano	2024	–			17 (Note: Appearances in the Campeonato Carioca Série A2 and Campeonato Carioca Série B1)	2	0	0	6	1	23	3
Linense	2025	Paulista A2	—		11	1	—		—		11	1
Londrina	2025	Série C	12	0	—		—		—		12	0
Juventus-SP	2026	Paulista A2	—		8	0	—		—		8	0
Velo Clube	2026	Série D	—		—		—		—		0	0
Career total			19	1	143	14	1	0	16	1	179	16

== Honours ==
Juventus-SP

- Campeonato Paulista Série A2: 2026

Nova Iguaçu

- Campeonato Carioca Série A2: 2020
