= Fabián Espinoza =

Chilean footballer (born 1998)

Personal information
- Full name: Fabián Ignacio Espinoza Valenzuela
- Date of birth: 1 June 1998 (age 28)
- Place of birth: Concepción, Chile
- Height: 1.70 m (5 ft 7 in)
- Position: Midfielder

Team information
- Current team: Deportes Puerto Montt
- Number: 21

Youth career
- 2017: Universidad de Concepción

Senior career*
Years	Team	Apps	(Gls)
2018–2021	Universidad de Concepción	1	(0)
2018–2019	→ Independiente Cauquenes (loan)	31	(3)
2020–2021	→ Fernández Vial (loan)	19	(1)
2021–2022	Fernández Vial	47	(5)
2023	Deportes La Serena	25	(2)
2024	Deportes Iquique	6	(0)
2024–2025	Deportes Temuco	26	(0)
2026	Juventus-SP	0	(0)
2026–	Deportes Puerto Montt	0	(0)
- * Club domestic league appearances and goals as of 12 June 2026

Fabián Ignacio Espinoza Valenzuela (born 1 June 1998) is a Chilean professional footballer who plays as a midfielder for Deportes Puerto Montt.

== Club career ==
After beginning his career with hometown side Universidad de Concepción, Espinoza played in just one match for the club before being loaned out to Independiente de Cauquenes in the Segunda División Profesional. In 2020, he signed for fellow third division team Fernández Vial, and helped the club to achieve promotion to Primera B in his first season.

On 16 December 2021, Espinoza renewed his contract with Vial for a further year. On 19 January 2023, he moved to fellow second division side Deportes La Serena.

On 6 January 2024, Espinoza joined fellow Deportes Iquique in Primera División, after his link with La Serena expired. Rarely used, he signed for Deportes Temuco in the second division in June.

On 4 December 2025, Espinoza moved abroad for the first time in his career, joining Juventus-SP in the Campeonato Paulista Série A2. After suffering a muscle injury which prevented him from playing as the club won the state league title, he returned to his home country and signed for Deportes Puerto Montt in the second division on 12 June 2026.

== Career statistics ==
As of match played 12 July 2026

Appearances and goals by club, season and competition
Club	Season	League			Cup		Continental		State League		Other		Total	
Club	Season	Division	Apps	Goals	Apps	Goals	Apps	Goals	Apps	Goals	Apps	Goals	Apps	Goals
Universidad de Concepción	2018	Primera División	1	0	—		—		—		—		1	0
Independiente de Cauquenes (loan)	2018	Segunda División Profesional	10	1	—		—		—		—		10	1
Independiente de Cauquenes (loan)	2019	Segunda División Profesional	21	2	1	0	—		—		—		22	2
Independiente de Cauquenes (loan)	Total		31	3	1	0	—		—		—		32	3
Fernández Vial	2020	Segunda División Profesional	19	1	0	0	—		—		—		19	1
Fernández Vial	2021	Primera B	25	3	6	1	—		—		—		31	4
Fernández Vial	2022	Primera B	22	2	2	0	—		—		—		24	2
Fernández Vial	Total		66	6	8	1	—		—		—		74	7
Deportes La Serena	2023	Primera B	25	2	1	0	—		—		—		26	2
Deportes Iquique	2024	Primera División	6	0	0	0	—		—		—		6	0
Deportes Temuco	2024	Primera B	14	0	1	0	—		—		—		15	0
Deportes Temuco	2025	Primera B	13	0	6	0	—		—		—		19	0
Deportes Temuco	Total		27	0	7	0	—		—		—		34	0
Juventus-SP	2026	Série A2	—		—		—		—		—		0	0
Deportes Puerto Montt	2026	Primera B	0	0	1	0	0	0	0	0	0	0	1	0
Career total			156	11	18	1	0	0	0	0	0	0	174	12

== Honours ==
Fernández Vial

- Segunda División Profesional de Chile: 2020

Juventus-SP

- Campeonato Paulista Série A2: 2026
