= Maycon Douglas =

Brazilian footballer

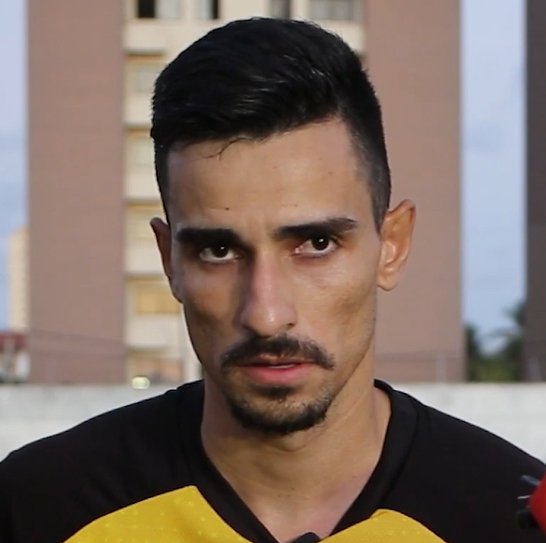
- Maycon Douglas in 2022

Personal information
- Full name: Maycon Douglas Oliveira Silva
- Date of birth: 27 August 1996 (age 30)
- Place of birth: Rio Bonito, Brazil
- Height: 1.80 m (5 ft 11 in)
- Position: Forward

Team information
- Current team: Juventus-SP
- Number: 30

Youth career
- 2015–2016: Friburguense
- 2016: → Cruzeiro (loan)

Senior career*
Years	Team	Apps	(Gls)
2015–2016	Friburguense	4	(0)
2017–2024	Tombense	36	(1)
2018	→ Almirante Barroso (loan)	0	(0)
2019	→ ASA (loan)	3	(0)
2019	→ Friburguense (loan)	14	(3)
2021	→ ABC (loan)	4	(2)
2021	→ Bahia (loan)	25	(1)
2022	→ CRB (loan)	12	(0)
2023	→ ABC (loan)	45	(8)
2024	→ Brusque (loan)	8	(0)
2024	→ São Bernardo (loan)	8	(1)
2025	Retrô	18	(3)
2026–	Juventus-SP	8	(3)
- * Club domestic league appearances and goals as of 6 May 2026

Maycon Douglas Oliveira Silva (born 27 August 1996), known as Maycon Douglas or simply Maycon, is a Brazilian footballer who plays as a forward for Juventus-SP.

== Club career ==
Born in Rio Bonito, Rio de Janeiro, Maycon made his senior debut with Friburguense on 28 October 2015, starting in a 0–1 Copa Rio home loss against Angra dos Reis. The following 1 March, he was loaned to Cruzeiro's under-20 squad for the remainder of the year.

On 18 January 2017, Maycon signed a four-year deal with Tombense. After failing to establish himself as a starter, he served loans at Almirante Barroso and ASA before returning to Friburguense on 21 June 2019, also in a temporary deal.

Maycon featured regularly for Tombense during the 2020 campaign, and joined ABC on loan on 11 February 2021. On 23 April, he moved to Série A side Bahia on loan until December.

Maycon made his top tier debut on 29 May 2021, playing 16 minutes in a 3–0 home win over Santos. He scored his first goal in the category on 27 June, but in a 3–2 away loss to Palmeiras, but was not bought by the club and moved to CRB on 25 December.

In the following two seasons, Maycon served loans at ABC, Brusque and São Bernardo. On 12 November 2024, he was announced at Retrô for the upcoming season.

On 1 December 2025, Juventus-SP announced the signing of Maycon.

== Career statistics ==
As of match played 6 May 2026

Appearances and goals by club, season and competition
Club	Season	League			State League		Cup		Continental		Other		Total	
Club	Season	Division	Apps	Goals	Apps	Goals	Apps	Goals	Apps	Goals	Apps	Goals	Apps	Goals
Friburguense	2015	Carioca	—		0	0	—		—		1 (Note: Appearance(s) in Copa Rio)	0	1	0
Friburguense	2016	Carioca	—		4	0	—		—		—		4	0
Friburguense	Total		—		4	0	—		—		1	0	5	0
Tombense	2017	Série C	3	0	0	0	—		—		—		3	0
Tombense	2018	Série C	1	0	5	0	—		—		—		6	0
Tombense	2020	Série C	14	1	13	0	—		—		—		27	1
Tombense	Total		18	1	18	0	—		—		—		36	1
Almirante Barroso (loan)	2018	Catarinense Série B	—		0	0	—		—		4 (Note: Appearance(s) in Copa Santa Catarina)	0	4	0
ASA (loan)	2019	Série D	0	0	3	0	0	0	—		—		3	0
Friburguense (loan)	2019	Carioca B1	—		14	3	—		—		—		14	3
ABC (loan)	2021	Série D	0	0	4	2	2	1	—		8 (Note: Appearance(s) in Copa do Nordeste)	2	14	5
Bahia (loan)	2021	Série A	21	1	—		—		4 (Note: Appearance(s) in Copa Sudamericana)	0	—		25	1
CRB (loan)	2022	Série B	7	0	1	0	0	0	—		4	0	12	0
ABC (loan)	2023	Série B	22	3	12	4	3	0	—		8	1	45	8
Brusque (loan)	2024	Série B	—		8	0	0	0	—		—		8	0
São Bernardo (loan)	2024	Série C	8	1	—		—		—		—		8	1
Retrô	2025	Série C	11	2	7	1	4	1	—		1	0	23	4
Juventus-SP	2026	Paulista A2	—		8	3	—		—		—		8	3
Career total			87	8	79	13	9	2	4	0	26	3	205	26

== Honours ==
Friburguense

- Campeonato Carioca Série B1: 2019

CRB

- Campeonato Alagoano: 2022

Juventus-SP

- Campeonato Paulista Série A2: 2026
