= Freitas (footballer, born 2003) =

Brazilian footballer

Personal information
- Full name: Francisco José Freire de Freitas
- Date of birth: 4 March 2003 (age 23)
- Place of birth: Aracati, Brazil
- Height: 1.78 m (5 ft 10 in)
- Position: Midfielder

Team information
- Current team: Juventus-SP (on loan from Fluminense)
- Number: 35

Youth career
- 2020: Atlético Cearense
- 2021–2023: → Fluminense (loan)

Senior career*
Years	Team	Apps	(Gls)
2021–2023	Atlético Cearense	0	(0)
2021	→ Tianguá (loan)	6	(0)
2022	→ Fluminense (loan)	1	(0)
2023–	Fluminense	0	(0)
2024	→ Grêmio Prudente (loan)	0	(0)
2025	→ Remo (loan)	0	(0)
2026	→ Juventus-SP (loan)	0	(0)
- * Club domestic league appearances and goals as of 4 March 2023

Francisco José Freire de Freitas (born 4 March 2003), known as Freitas, is a Brazilian footballer who plays as a midfielder for Juventus-SP, on loan from Fluminense.

== Club career ==
Freitas made his professional debut for Fluminense on 22 January 2023. He had been on loan from Série D side Atlético Cearense, and a week later, on 31 January 2023, the move was made permanent.

== Career statistics ==
As of match played 12 September 2026

Appearances and goals by club, season and competition
Club	Season	League			State League		Cup		Continental		Other		Total	
Club	Season	Division	Apps	Goals	Apps	Goals	Apps	Goals	Apps	Goals	Apps	Goals	Apps	Goals
Tianguá	2021	Cearense Série C	–		6 (Note: Appearances in the Campeonato Cearense Série C)	0	—		—		—		6	0
Fluminense	2023	Série A	0	0	1 (Note: Appearances in the Campeonato Carioca)	0	0	0	0	0	—		1	0
Grêmio Prudente (loan)	2024	Série A3	0	0	0	0	0	0	0	0	2 (Note: Appearances in the Copa Paulista)	0	2	0
Remo (loan)	2025	Série B	4	0	0	0	0	0	0	0	0	0	4	0
Remo (loan)	2026	Série A	0	0	5 (Note: Appearances in the Campeonato Paraense)	0	0	0	0	0	0	0	5	0
Remo (loan)	Total		4	0	5	0	0	0	0	0	0	0	9	0
Juventus-SP (loan)	2026	Série A2	0	0	0	0	0	0	0	0	5	0	5	0
Career total			4	0	12	0	0	0	0	0	7	0	23	0
