= Edinho (footballer, born 2001) =

Brazilian footballer (born 2000)

Personal information
- Full name: Eder Maciel Lopes
- Date of birth: 23 August 2001 (age 25)
- Place of birth: Brasília, Brazil
- Height: 1.71 m (5 ft 7 in)
- Position: Midfielder

Team information
- Current team: Juventus-SP
- Number: 10

Youth career
- 2018–2020: Atlético Tubarão
- 2020–2022: Fluminense

Senior career*
Years	Team	Apps	(Gls)
2019–2020	Atlético Tubarão	10	(0)
2022–2024	Fluminense	4	(0)
2023	→ Bangu (loan)	9	(0)
2023	→ Avaí (loan)	4	(0)
2024	→ Azuriz (loan)	5	(1)
2024	→ São José-RS (loan)	13	(0)
2025	Azuriz	21	(1)
2025	Rio Branco-ES	3	(0)
2026–	Juventus-SP	24	(3)
- * Club domestic league appearances and goals as of 14 May 2026

Eder Maciel Lopes (born 16 October 2000), known as Edinho, is a Brazilian professional footballer who plays as a midfielder for Juventus-SP.

== Career ==
Born in Brasília, Federal District, Edinho joined Atlético Tubarão's youth setup in March 2018, and was promoted to the first team for the 2019 Copa Santa Catarina. On 5 November 2020, he moved to Fluminense and returned to youth setup.

Edinho made his first team debut for Flu on 12 March 2022, coming on as a late substiute for Mario Pineida in a 0–0 Campeonato Carioca away draw against Boavista. On 31 December, after being mainly used in the under-23 team, he was loaned to Bangu for the 2023 Campeonato Carioca.

On 18 May 2023, Edinho renewed his contract with Fluminense until December 2024, and was loaned to Série B side Avaí until the end of the year on 13 July. On 5 February 2024, he moved to Azuriz also in a temporary deal.

On 13 June 2024, still owned by Flu, Edinho was announced at São José-RS. He subsequently returned to Azuriz on a permanent deal for the 2025 season, before moving to Rio Branco-ES on 28 July of that year.

In December 2025, Edinho was announced at Juventus-SP for the upcoming season.

== Career statistics ==
As of match played 22 September 2026

Appearances and goals by club, season and competition
Club	Season	League			State League		Cup		Continental		Other		Total	
Club	Season	Division	Apps	Goals	Apps	Goals	Apps	Goals	Apps	Goals	Apps	Goals	Apps	Goals
Atlético Tubarão	2019	Catarinense Série B	—		—		—		—		4 (Note: Appearances in Copa Santa Catarina)	0	4	0
Atlético Tubarão	2020	Catarinense	—		10	0	—		—		—		10	0
Atlético Tubarão	Total		—		10	0	—		—		4	0	14	0
Fluminense	2022	Série A	0	0	1	0	0	0	0	0	0	0	1	0
Fluminense	2024	Série A	0	0	3	0	0	0	0	0	0	0	3	0
Fluminense	Total		0	0	4	0	0	0	0	0	0	0	4	0
Bangu (loan)	2023	Carioca	—		9	0	—		—		—		9	0
Avaí (loan)	2023	Série B	4	0	—		—		—		3	0	7	0
Azuriz (loan)	2024	Paranaense	—		5	1	—		—		—		5	1
São José-RS (loan)	2024	Série C	13	0	—		—		—		11 (Note: Appearances in Copa FGF)	0	24	0
Azuriz	2025	Série D	8	1	13	0	—		—		—		21	1
Rio Branco-ES	2025	Série D	3	0	—		—		—		—		3	0
Juventus-SP	2026	Paulista A2	—		24	3	—		—		7 (Note: Appearances in Copa Paulista)	1	31	4
Career total			28	1	65	4	0	0	0	0	25	1	118	6

== Honours ==
Juventus-SP

- Campeonato Paulista Série A2: 2026
