= Andrew (footballer, born 1996) =

Brazilian footballer

Personal information
- Full name: Andrew Lucas Balbino Drummond
- Date of birth: 15 September 1996 (age 30)
- Place of birth: Rio de Janeiro, Brazil
- Height: 1.72 m (5 ft 8 in)
- Position: Winger

Team information
- Current team: Juventus-SP
- Number: 99

Youth career
- 2011: Nova Iguaçu
- 2012–2015: Criciúma

Senior career*
Years	Team	Apps	(Gls)
2014–2020	Criciúma	107	(12)
2020–2021	Paraná	8	(0)
2021	Brusque	9	(0)
2021–2023	Figueirense	68	(8)
2024	Inter de Limeira	11	(1)
2024–2025	Floresta	20	(0)
2025–2026	Caxias	3	(0)
2026–	Juventus-SP	11	(0)
- * Club domestic league appearances and goals as of 13 May 2026

Andrew Lucas Balbino Drummond (born 15 September 1996 ), simply known as Andrew, is a Brazilian professional footballer who plays as a winger for Juventus-SP.

== Career ==
Born in Rio de Janeiro, Andrew joined Criciúma's youth setup in 2012, from Nova Iguaçu. In November 2014, he began training with the first team, and made his senior – and Série A – debut on the 19th of that month, in a 1–0 home loss to Bahia.

A backup option, Andrew started to feature more regularly in the 2018 season, and renewed his contract until 2020 on 28 March of that year. On 7 December 2020, he moved to Paraná Clube for the remainder of the season.

On 12 February 2021, Andrew agreed to a deal with Brusque. Sparingly used, he moved to Figueirense on 13 June, and became an undisputed starter for the new side.

On 27 September 2023, Andrew signed for Inter de Limeira for the upcoming season. He moved to Floresta the following March, and scored in the first leg of the 2024 Copa Fares Lopes first leg.

On 31 March 2025, Andrew was announced at fellow Série C side Caxias, but was unable to play during the year due to "contractual doubts". Despite featuring for the club in the 2026 season, he left on 17 February of that year, and subsequently joined Juventus-SP.

== Career statistics ==
As of match played 16 August 2026

Appearances and goals by club, season and competition
Club	Season	League			State League		Cup		Continental		Other		Total	
Club	Season	Division	Apps	Goals	Apps	Goals	Apps	Goals	Apps	Goals	Apps	Goals	Apps	Goals
Criciúma	2014	Série A	4	0	—		—		—		—		4	0
Criciúma	2015	Série B	0	0	1	0	0	0	—		—		1	0
Criciúma	2016	Série B	5	0	4	0	2	0	—		1 (Note: Appearances in Primeira Liga)	0	12	0
Criciúma	2017	Série B	4	0	7	1	1	0	—		—		12	1
Criciúma	2018	Série B	23	1	12	3	1	0	—		—		36	4
Criciúma	2019	Série B	18	2	11	4	3	0	—		—		32	6
Criciúma	2020	Série C	15	2	5	1	1	1	—		—		21	4
Criciúma	Total		69	5	40	9	8	1	—		1	0	118	15
Paraná	2020	Série B	8	0	—		—		—		—		8	0
Brusque	2021	Série B	—		9	0	1	0	—		—		10	0
Figueirense	2021	Série C	16	4	—		—		—		8 (Note: Appearances in Copa Santa Catarina)	0	24	4
Figueirense	2022	Série C	20	2	9	1	2	0	—		3 (Note: One appearance in Recopa Catarinense, two appearances and one goal in Copa Santa Catarina)	1	34	4
Figueirense	2023	Série C	14	2	8	1	—		—		8	0	30	3
Figueirense	Total		50	8	17	2	2	0	—		19	1	88	11
Inter de Limeira	2024	Série D	—		11	1	—		—		—		11	1
Floresta	2024	Série C	12	0	—		—		—		8 (Note: Appearances in Copa Fares Lopes)	1	20	1
Floresta	2025	Série C	—		8	0	—		—		—		8	0
Floresta	Total		12	0	8	0	—		—		8	1	28	1
Caxias	2025	Série C	0	0	—		—		—		—		0	0
Caxias	2026	Série C	—		3	0	0	0	—		0	0	3	0
Caxias	Total		0	0	3	0	0	0	—		0	0	3	0
Juventus-SP	2026	Série A2	—		11	0	—		—		2 (Note: Appearances in Copa Paulista)	0	13	0
Career total			139	13	99	12	11	1	0	0	30	2	279	28

== Honours ==
Criciúma

- Copa Santa Catarina: 2021
- Recopa Catarinense: 2022

Juventus-SP

- Campeonato Paulista Série A2: 2026
