= Keven (footballer) =

Brazilian footballer (born 2003)

Personal information
- Full name: Keven Vinícius Duarte Silva
- Date of birth: 15 February 2003 (age 23)
- Place of birth: São Paulo, Brazil
- Height: 1.69 m (5 ft 7 in)
- Position: Attacking midfielder

Team information
- Current team: Juventus-SP
- Number: 31

Youth career
- 2011–2022: Corinthians

Senior career*
Years	Team	Apps	(Gls)
2023–2024	Almería B	20	(4)
2025	Pouso Alegre	0	(0)
2026–	Juventus-SP	19	(0)
- * Club domestic league appearances and goals as of 13 May 2026

Keven Vinícius Duarte Silva (born 15 February 2003), simply known as Keven, is a Brazilian professional footballer who plays as an attacking midfielder for Juventus-SP.

== Club career ==
Born in São Paulo, Keven joined Corinthians for the under-13 team, and spent 11 years in their youth sides. He left after his contract expired in December 2022, and was announced at UD Almería in February 2023, initially for their B-team in Tercera Federación.

On 1 May 2024, Keven scored four goals in a 14–1 home routing of Atlético Melilla CF. He left the club shortly after, and returned to Brazil with Pouso Alegre on 29 December.

Unable to play for Pousão as Corinthians had blocked any contracts within the country, Keven was released in July 2025 after his registration issues were solved. On 6 December, he was announced at Juventus-SP.

== Career statistics ==
As of match played 16 August 2026

Appearances and goals by club, season and competition
Club	Season	League			State League		Cup		Continental		Other		Total	
Club	Season	Division	Apps	Goals	Apps	Goals	Apps	Goals	Apps	Goals	Apps	Goals	Apps	Goals
Almería B	2022–23	Tercera Federación	3	0	—		—		—		—		3	0
Almería B	2023–24	Tercera Federación	17	4	—		—		—		—		17	4
Almería B	Total		20	4	—		—		—		—		20	4
Pouso Alegre	2025	Série D	0	0	0	0	0	0	—		—		0	0
Juventus-SP	2026	Paulista A2	—		19	0	—		—		5 (Note: Appearance(s) in Copa Paulista)	1	24	1
Career total			20	4	19	0	0	0	0	0	5	1	44	5

== Honours ==
Juventus-SP

- Campeonato Paulista Série A2: 2026
