= Henrique Miranda (footballer, born 2006) =

Brazilian footballer (born 2006)

Personal information
- Full name: Henrique Miranda Quixabeira
- Date of birth: 16 February 2006 (age 20)
- Place of birth: Santo André, Brazil
- Position: Attacking midfielder

Team information
- Current team: Juventus-SP
- Number: 18

Youth career
- Juventus-SP
- 2016–2024: Santos
- 2024–2025: Juventus-SP

Senior career*
Years	Team	Apps	(Gls)
2025–	Juventus-SP	10	(0)
- * Club domestic league appearances and goals as of 5 May 2026

Henrique Miranda Quixabeira (born 16 February 2006), known as Henrique Miranda, is a Brazilian professional footballer who plays as an attacking midfielder for Juventus-SP.

== Career ==
After playing for the futsal and under-11 sides of Juventus-SP, Henrique Miranda joined the youth categories of Santos in late 2016. He renewed his contract until 2024 on 11 April 2023, but was released by the club the following February.

Shortly after leaving Peixe, Henrique Miranda returned to Juventus and was a member of their under-20 team. He was promoted to the main squad in January 2025, and made his senior debut on 12 February of that year, coming on as a second-half substitute for Cesinha in a 1–1 Campeonato Paulista Série A2 away draw against Votuporanguense.

== Career statistics ==
As of match played 19 July 2026

Appearances and goals by club, season and competition
Club	Season	League			State League		Cup		Continental		Other		Total	
Club	Season	Division	Apps	Goals	Apps	Goals	Apps	Goals	Apps	Goals	Apps	Goals	Apps	Goals
Juventus-SP	2025	Paulista A2	—		6	0	—		—		—		6	0
Juventus-SP	2026	Paulista A2	—		4	0	—		—		1 (Note: Appearances in Copa Paulista)	0	5	0
Career total			0	0	10	0	0	0	0	0	1	0	11	0

== Honours ==
Juventus-SP

- Campeonato Paulista Série A2: 2026
