= Lucas Justen =

Brazilian footballer (born 2003)

Personal information
- Full name: Lucas da Silva Justen
- Date of birth: 3 July 2003 (age 23)
- Place of birth: Petrópolis, Brazil
- Height: 1.85 m (6 ft 1 in)
- Positions: Right-back; centre-back

Team information
- Current team: Juventus-SP (on loan from Fluminense)
- Number: 15

Youth career
- 2015–2023: Fluminense

Senior career*
Years	Team	Apps	(Gls)
2023–	Fluminense	6	(0)
2025	→ Guarani (loan)	28	(1)
2026	→ Ponte Preta (loan)	5	(0)
2026–	→ Juventus-SP (loan)	0	(0)
- * Club domestic league appearances and goals as of 18 July 2026

Lucas da Silva Justen (born 3 July 2003) is a Brazilian professional footballer who plays as either a right-back or a centre-back for Juventus-SP, on loan from Fluminense.

== Club career ==
=== Fluminense ===
Born in Petrópolis, Rio de Janeiro, Justen joined Fluminense's youth sides at the age of 12. He made his first team – and Série A – debut on 3 December 2023, starting and being sent off in a 1–0 away loss to Palmeiras.

On 19 April 2024, Justen renewed his contract with Flu until 2026.

=== Guarani ===
In 2025, Justen joined Guarani on loan, where he featured in both the Campeonato Paulista and the Série C, making 28 appearances and registering one goal and one assist across the season; the club narrowly missed out on promotion to the Série B.

=== Ponte Preta ===
Justen returned to Fluminense at the end of his loan before being sent to Ponte Preta, rivals of his former loan club Guarani, ahead of their 2026 Série B campaign.

=== Clube Atlético Juventus ===
Justen left Ponte Preta to sign for Clube Atlético Juventus, newly promoted to the Campeonato Paulista top flight, in July 2026. The club's announcement stated that he had completed his entire football formation at Fluminense, including a spell with its professional squad, before his loan spells at Guarani and Ponte Preta. He began training with the squad immediately in preparation for the 2026 Copa Paulista.

== Career statistics ==
As of 12 September 2026

Appearances and goals by club, season and competition
Club	Season	League			State league		National cup		Continental		Other		Total	
Club	Season	Division	Apps	Goals	Apps	Goals	Apps	Goals	Apps	Goals	Apps	Goals	Apps	Goals
Fluminense	2023	Série A	1	0	0	0	0	0	0	0	0	0	1	0
Fluminense	2024	Série A	0	0	5	0	0	0	0	0	0	0	5	0
Fluminense	Total		1	0	5	0	0	0	0	0	0	0	6	0
Guarani (loan)	2025	Série C	19	1	9	0	0	0	0	0	3 (Note: Appearance(s) in Copa Paulista)	0	31	1
Ponte Preta (loan)	2026	Série B	5	0	0	0	0	0	0	0	0	0	5	0
Juventus-SP (loan)	2026	Série A2	0	0	0	0	0	0	0	0	3	0	3	0
Career total			15	1	14	0	0	0	0	0	6	0	45	1

== Honours ==
Fluminense

- Copa Libertadores: 2023
- Recopa Sudamericana: 2024
