= Victor Lustosa =

Brazilian footballer (born 2003)

Personal information
- Full name: Victor Lustosa Rodrigues Silva
- Date of birth: 17 January 2003 (age 23)
- Place of birth: Goiânia, Brazil
- Height: 1.81 m (5 ft 11 1/2 in)
- Position: Midfielder

Team information
- Current team: Grêmio Anápolis

Youth career
- 2017: Desportivo Brasil
- 2018–2022: Grêmio
- 2022–2023: Bahia
- 2023: Goiás

Senior career*
Years	Team	Apps	(Gls)
2022	Grêmio	0	(0)
2022	→ São Luiz (loan)	6	(0)
2023	Bahia	2	(0)
2024–2025	Goiás	0	(0)
2024	→ Concórdia (loan)	5	(0)
2026	Juventus-SP	6	(0)
2026–	Grêmio Anápolis	0	(0)
- * Club domestic league appearances and goals as of 5 May 2026

Victor Lustosa Rodrigues Silva (born 15 February 2003), known as Victor Lustosa or just Lustosa, is a Brazilian professional footballer who plays as a midfielder for Grêmio Anápolis.

== Career ==
Born in Goiânia, Goiás, Lustosa joined Grêmio's youth setup in 2018, from Desportivo Brasil. In May 2022, he was loaned to São Luiz for the 2022 Série D.

Back to his parent club in July 2022, Lustosa signed a permanent deal with Bahia in September, initially for the under-20 team. The following 1 June, he moved to Goiás also for the under-20s, and renewed his contract with the latter for two further years on 27 October 2023.

Promoted to the first team ahead of the 2024 season, Lustosa failed to make an appearance for the Esmeraldino and was loaned to Concórdia on 15 March of that year. He also made no appearances for Goiás in 2025, before joining Juventus-SP on 8 January 2026.

== Career statistics ==
As of match played 5 May 2026

Appearances and goals by club, season and competition
Club	Season	League			State League		Cup		Continental		Other		Total	
Club	Season	Division	Apps	Goals	Apps	Goals	Apps	Goals	Apps	Goals	Apps	Goals	Apps	Goals
São Luiz (loan)	2022	Série D	6	0	—		—		—		—		6	0
Bahia	2023	Série A	0	0	2	0	0	0	—		—		2	0
Goiás	2024	Série B	0	0	0	0	0	0	—		—		0	0
Goiás	2025	Série B	0	0	0	0	0	0	—		—		0	0
Goiás	Total		0	0	0	0	0	0	—		—		0	0
Concórdia (loan)	2024	Série D	5	0	—		—		—		—		5	0
Juventus-SP	2026	Paulista A2	—		6	0	—		—		—		6	0
Career total			11	0	8	0	0	0	0	0	0	0	19	0

== Honours ==
Juventus-SP

- Campeonato Paulista Série A2: 2026
