= Lucas Lopes (footballer) =

Brazilian footballer (born 1998)

Personal information
- Full name: Lucas dos Santos Lopes
- Date of birth: 16 February 1998 (age 28)
- Place of birth: Rio Grande, Brazil
- Height: 1.82 m (6 ft 0 in)
- Position: Right-back

Team information
- Current team: Juventus-SP
- Number: 21

Senior career*
Years	Team	Apps	(Gls)
2017	Rio Grande	15	(0)
2018	União Rondonópolis	9	(0)
2019	São Paulo-RS	11	(0)
2019	São Borja	0	(0)
2020–2022	Grêmio Anápolis	8	(0)
2020–2021	→ Leixões (loan)	20	(0)
2022	→ Luverdense (loan)	11	(0)
2022	→ Avenida (loan)	13	(0)
2022	Aimoré	0	(0)
2023	Avenida	10	(0)
2023	Portuguesa Santista	2	(0)
2023	Maringá	7	(0)
2023–2024	Ypiranga-RS	13	(0)
2024	Sampaio Corrêa	11	(0)
2024–2025	Hercílio Luz	11	(1)
2025	Botafogo-PB	13	(0)
2025–2026	Joinville	11	(0)
2026–	Juventus-SP	7	(0)
- * Club domestic league appearances and goals as of 13 May 2026

Lucas dos Santos Lopes (born 16 February 1998), known as Lucas Lopes or sometimes as Lucas Gaúcho, is a Brazilian footballer who plays as a right-back for Juventus-SP.

== Career statistics ==
As of match played 22 September 2026

Appearances and goals by club, season and competition
Club	Season	League			State League		Cup (Note: Includes Copa do Brasil)		Other		Total	
Club	Season	Division	Apps	Goals	Apps	Goals	Apps	Goals	Apps	Goals	Apps	Goals
Rio Grande	2017	Gaúcho Série B	—		15	0	—		—		15	0
União Rondonópolis	2018	Mato-Grossense	—		9	0	1	0	—		10	0
São Paulo-RS	2019	Gaúcho Série A2	—		11	0	—		—		11	0
São Borja	2019	Gaúcho Série A2	—		—		—		11 (Note: Appearances in the Copa FGF)	1	11	1
Grêmio Anápolis	2020	Goiano	—		7	0	—		—		7	0
Grêmio Anápolis	2022	Série D	1	0	—		—		—		1	0
Grêmio Anápolis	Total		1	0	7	0	—		—		8	0
Leixões (loan)	2020–21	Liga Portugal 2	20	0	—		0	0	0	0	20	0
Avenida (loan)	2021	Gaúcho Série A2	—		13	0	—		—		13	0
Luverdense (loan)	2022	Mato-Grossense	—		11	0	—		—		11	0
Avenida (loan)	2022	Gaúcho Série A2	—		13	0	—		—		13	0
Aimoré	2022	Gaúcho Série A2	—		—		—		1	0	1	0
Avenida	2023	Gaúcho	—		10	0	—		—		10	0
Portuguesa Santista	2023	Paulista A2	—		2	0	—		—		2	0
Maringá	2023	Série D	7	0	—		1	0	—		8	0
Ypiranga-RS	2023	Série C	7	0	—		—		—		7	0
Ypiranga-RS	2024	Série C	—		6	0	2	0	—		8	0
Ypiranga-RS	Total		7	0	6	0	2	0	—		15	0
Sampaio Corrêa	2024	Série C	6	0	5	0	—		—		11	0
Hercílio Luz	2024	Catarinense Série B	—		—		—		8 (Note: Appearances in the Copa Santa Catarina)	0	8	0
Hercílio Luz	2025	Catarinense	—		11	1	—		—		11	1
Hercílio Luz	Total		—		11	1	—		8	0	19	1
Botafogo-PB	2025	Série C	9	0	4	0	—		—		13	0
Joinville	2025	Série D	2	0	—		—		10	0	12	0
Joinville	2026	Série D	—		9	0	0	0	—		9	0
Joinville	Total		2	0	9	0	—		10	0	21	0
Juventus-SP	2026	Paulista A2	—		7	0	—		7 (Note: Appearance(s) in Copa Paulista)	0	14	0
Career total			52	0	133	1	4	0	37	1	226	2

== Honours ==
Sampaio Corrêa

- Campeonato Maranhense: 2024

Juventus-SP

- Campeonato Paulista Série A2: 2026
