= Ferreira (footballer, born 1993) =

Brazilian footballer (born 1993)

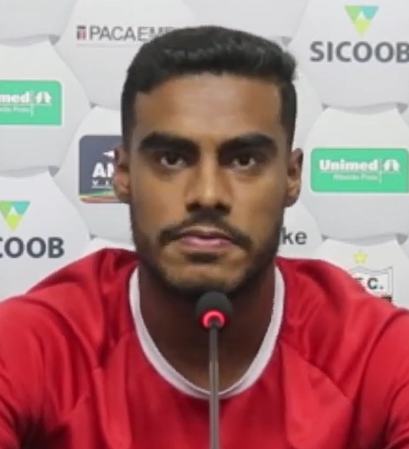
- Ferreira in 2020

Personal information
- Full name: Matheus Ferreira de Sousa
- Date of birth: 19 February 1993 (age 33)
- Place of birth: Divinópolis, Brazil
- Height: 1.90 m (6 ft 3 in)
- Position: Defensive midfielder

Team information
- Current team: Juventus-SP
- Number: 33

Youth career
- 2011–2012: Red Bull Brasil

Senior career*
Years	Team	Apps	(Gls)
2011–2012	Red Bull Brasil	0	(0)
2013–2014	Monte Azul	18	(0)
2014	→ Penapolense (loan)	6	(0)
2015–2019	São Caetano	68	(7)
2018	→ Sport Recife (loan)	7	(0)
2019–2020	Berço	3	(0)
2020	→ Botafogo-SP (loan)	25	(1)
2021	Oeste	6	(0)
2022	XV de Novembro	9	(2)
2022	CSA	8	(0)
2023	Aparecidense	30	(0)
2024–2025	América de Natal	56	(3)
2024	→ Athletic-MG (loan)	4	(0)
2026–	Juventus-SP	22	(1)
- * Club domestic league appearances and goals as of 22:32, 13 May 2026 (UTC) ‡ National team caps and goals as of 29 April 2026

Matheus Ferreira de Sousa (born 19 February 1993), commonly known as Ferreira, is a Brazilian footballer who plays for Juventus-SP. Mainly a defensive midfielder, he can also play as a centre-back.

== Career ==
Born in Divinópolis, Minas Gerais, Ferreira played for Red Bull Brasil as a youth, before making his senior debut in 2011. He moved to Monte Azul in 2013, and served a loan stint at Penapolense in the following year before moving to São Caetano ahead of the 2015 season.

On 4 April 2018, after being a regular starter for Azulão, Ferreira was loaned to Série A side Sport Recife until the end of the year. He made his top tier debut on 15 April, starting in a 3–0 away loss to América Mineiro, but subsequently featured rarely before departing in December and returning to his parent club.

In 2019, Ferreira moved abroad for the first time in his career, joining Campeonato de Portugal side Berço. On 10 January of the following year, he returned to his home country after being announced at Botafogo-SP.

On 16 August 2021, after spending the first half of the season without a club, Ferreira signed for Oeste. He moved to XV de Novembro on 14 December, before joining CSA on 5 July 2022.

On 9 January 2023, Ferreira agreed to a deal with Aparecidense. Regularly used, he moved to América de Natal on 1 December, where he was an undisputed first-choice before being loaned out to Athletic-MG in August 2024.

Back to América for the 2025 season, Ferreira was again a first-choice before departing the club on 31 October. On 4 December, he was announced at Juventus-SP.

== Career statistics ==
As of match played 22 September 2026

Appearances and goals by club, season and competition
Club	Season	League			State League		Cup		Continental		Other		Total	
Club	Season	Division	Apps	Goals	Apps	Goals	Apps	Goals	Apps	Goals	Apps	Goals	Apps	Goals
Red Bull Brasil	2011	Paulista A2	—		—		—		—		1 (Note: Appearances in Copa Paulista)	0	1	0
Red Bull Brasil	2012	Paulista A2	—		0	0	—		—		—		0	0
Red Bull Brasil	Total		—		0	0	—		—		1	0	1	0
Monte Azul	2013	Paulista A2	—		—		—		—		13	0	13	0
Monte Azul	2014	Paulista A2	—		18	0	—		—		—		18	0
Monte Azul	Total		—		18	0	—		—		13	0	31	0
Penapolense (loan)	2014	Série D	6	0	—		—		—		—		6	0
São Caetano	2015	Série D	1	0	9	3	—		—		—		10	3
São Caetano	2016	Série A2	—		20	3	—		—		17	2	37	5
São Caetano	2017	Série A2	—		18	1	—		—		16	2	34	3
São Caetano	2018	Paulista	—		9	0	0	0	—		—		9	0
São Caetano	2019	Série D	3	0	8	0	—		—		10	1	21	1
São Caetano	Total		4	0	64	7	0	0	—		43	5	111	12
Sport Recife (loan)	2018	Série A	7	0	—		—		—		—		7	0
Berço	2019–2020	Campeonato de Portugal	3	0	—		0	0	—		—		3	0
Botafogo-SP (loan)	2020	Série B	17	1	8	0	—		—		—		25	1
Oeste	2021	Série C	6	0	—		—		—		—		6	0
XV de Novembro	2022	Paulista A2	—		9	2	—		—		—		9	2
CSA	2022	Série B	8	0	—		—		—		—		8	0
Aparecidense	2023	Série C	18	0	12	0	—		—		—		30	0
América de Natal	2024	Série D	15	0	12	0	4	0	—		7 (Note: Appearances in Copa do Nordeste)	1	38	1
América de Natal	2025	Série D	18	3	11	0	1	0	—		5	0	35	3
América de Natal	Total		33	3	23	0	5	0	—		12	1	73	4
Athletic-MG (loan)	2024	Série C	4	0	—		—		—		—		4	0
Juventus-SP	2026	Paulista A2	—		22	1	—		—		3	0	25	1
Career total			106	4	156	10	5	0	0	0	72	6	339	20

== Honours ==
São Caetano

- Campeonato Paulista Série A2: 2017
- Copa Paulista: 2019

América de Natal

- Campeonato Potiguar: 2024, 2025

Juventus-SP

- Campeonato Paulista Série A2: 2026

Individual

- Campeonato Paulista Série A2 Team of the Season: 2026
