= Paulinho (footballer, born 2002) =

Brazilian footballer (born 2002)

Personal information
- Full name: Paulo César Fonseca Brandão
- Date of birth: 29 September 2002 (age 24)
- Place of birth: Itu, Brazil
- Height: 1.75 m (5 ft 9 in)
- Position: Winger

Team information
- Current team: Juventus-SP
- Number: 7

Youth career
- 2019: Guarani
- 2020–2022: Sport Recife

Senior career*
Years	Team	Apps	(Gls)
2020	Batatais	6	(1)
2021–2024	Sport Recife	18	(1)
2023	→ América de Natal (loan)	3	(0)
2023	→ Vitória das Tabocas (loan)	10	(7)
2024	→ Botafogo-PB (loan)	8	(0)
2025	Oeste	15	(2)
2025	Barra-SC	12	(1)
2026–	Juventus-SP	24	(5)
- * Club domestic league appearances and goals as of 13 May 2026

Paulo César Fonseca Brandão (born 29 September 2002), commonly known as Paulinho, is a Brazilian professional footballer who plays as a winger for Juventus-SP.

== Club career ==
Born in Itu, São Paulo, Paulinho played for the under-17 squad of Guarani in 2019 before making his senior debut with Batatais in the 2020 Campeonato Paulista Série A3. Late in that year, he was signed by Sport Recife and returned to youth setup.

Paulinho made his first team debut for Sport on 24 February 2021, starting and scoring his team's second in a 3–1 Campeonato Pernambucano away win over Vera Cruz. Unable to establish himself as a first team regular in the following years, he was loaned to América de Natal on 1 June 2023, and to Vitória das Tabocas in September.

After scoring seven goals in just ten matches for Vitória, Paulinho returned to Sport for the 2024 season, but again featured rarely before being again loaned out to Botafogo-PB on 27 February of that year. Upon returning, he played for the under-23 squad before rescinding his link on 23 December, and signed for Oeste for the 2025 campaign.

On 10 April 2025, Paulinho was announced at Série D side Barra-SC. After helping the side to achieve a first-ever promotion to the Série C as champions, he moved to Juventus-SP, also helping the side to achieve promotion in the 2026 Campeonato Paulista Série A2.

== Career statistics ==
As of match played 22 September 2026

Appearances and goals by club, season and competition
Club	Season	League			State League		Cup		Continental		Other		Total	
Club	Season	Division	Apps	Goals	Apps	Goals	Apps	Goals	Apps	Goals	Apps	Goals	Apps	Goals
Batatais	2020	Paulista A3	—		6	1	—		—		—		6	1
Sport Recife	2021	Série A	0	0	3	1	1	0	—		2 (Note: Appearance(s) in Copa do Nordeste)	0	6	1
Sport Recife	2022	Série B	2	0	3	0	0	0	—		3	0	8	0
Sport Recife	2023	Série B	1	0	6	0	1	0	—		3	0	11	0
Sport Recife	2024	Série B	0	0	3	0	0	0	—		0	0	3	0
Sport Recife	Total		3	0	15	1	2	0	—		8	0	28	1
América de Natal (loan)	2023	Série C	3	0	—		—		—		—		3	0
Vitória das Tabocas (loan)	2023	Pernambucano Série A2	—		10	7	—		—		—		10	7
Botafogo-PB (loan)	2024	Série C	2	0	6	0	0	0	—		3	0	11	0
Oeste	2025	Paulista A2	—		15	2	—		—		—		15	2
Barra-SC	2025	Série D	12	1	—		—		—		—		12	1
Juventus-SP	2026	Paulista A2	—		24	5	—		—		7 (Note: Appearances in Copa Paulista)	5	31	10
Career total			20	1	76	16	2	0	0	0	18	5	116	22

== Honours ==
Sport Recife

- Campeonato Pernambucano: 2023, 2024

Barra-SC

- Campeonato Brasileiro Série D: 2025

Juventus-SP

- Campeonato Paulista Série A2: 2026
