= Lucas Passarelli =

Brazilian footballer (born 1996)

Personal information
- Full name: Lucas Passarelli
- Date of birth: 28 June 1996 (age 30)
- Place of birth: Campinas, São Paulo, Brazil
- Height: 1.90 m (6 ft 3 in)
- Position: Goalkeeper

Team information
- Current team: Juventus-SP
- Number: 25

Youth career
- 2011–2015: Guarani

Senior career*
Years	Team	Apps	(Gls)
2015–2019	Guarani	2	(0)
2019	→ Botafogo-PB (loan)	0	(0)
2020	Iporá	9	(0)
2020	ABC	0	(0)
2021	Caldense	4	(0)
2021	Inter de Limeira	0	(0)
2022–2023	Marília	41	(0)
2023–2024	Athletic-MG	4	(0)
2025	Rio Claro	14	(0)
2025	FC Cascavel	13	(0)
2026–	Juventus-SP	18	(0)
- * Club domestic league appearances and goals as of 05:16, 13 May 2026 (UTC)

Lucas Passarelli (born 28 June 1996), is a Brazilian footballer who plays as a goalkeeper for Juventus-SP.

== Career ==
Born in Campinas, São Paulo, Passarelli played for Guarani as a youth, before being promoted to the first team in 2015. He made his senior debut on 17 January 2018, starting in a 1–0 Campeonato Paulista Série A2 away loss to Oeste.

Despite being only a backup option, Passarelli renewed his contract with Bugre until December 2019 on 17 May 2018. Roughly one year later, he was loaned to Botafogo-PB, but returned in September 2019 after failing to make an appearance for the side.

In December 2019, Passarelli signed for Iporá for the upcoming season. On 10 July 2020, he was announced at ABC, but was again a second-choice, and moved to Caldense on 15 December of that year.

On 20 May 2021, Passarelli agreed to a deal with Inter de Limeira. He moved to Marília on 2 November, and was a first-choice during his two-year spell at the club.

On 10 May 2023, Passarelli signed a contract with Athletic-MG of the Série D. On 4 December 2024, after two seasons as a backup, he moved to Rio Claro.

On 10 April 2025, FC Cascavel announced the signing of Passarelli. On 3 December, he joined Juventus-SP for the ensuing campaign.

== Career statistics ==
As of match played 22 September 2026

Appearances and goals by club, season and competition
Club	Season	League			State League		Cup		Continental		Other		Total	
Club	Season	Division	Apps	Goals	Apps	Goals	Apps	Goals	Apps	Goals	Apps	Goals	Apps	Goals
Guarani	2015	Série C	0	0	0	0	—		—		—		0	0
Guarani	2016	Série C	0	0	0	0	—		—		—		0	0
Guarani	2017	Série B	0	0	0	0	—		—		—		0	0
Guarani	2018	Série B	1	0	1	0	—		—		—		2	0
Guarani	Total		1	0	1	0	—		—		—		2	0
Botafogo-PB (loan)	2019	Série C	0	0	—		—		—		—		0	0
Iporá	2020	Goiano	—		9	0	—		—		—		9	0
ABC	2020	Série D	0	0	0	0	—		—		0	0	0	0
Caldense	2021	Série D	—		4	0	1	0	—		—		5	0
Inter de Limeira	2021	Série D	0	0	—		—		—		—		0	0
Marília	2022	Paulista A3	—		21	0	—		—		10 (Note: Appearances in Copa Paulista)	0	31	0
Marília	2023	Paulista A3	—		20	0	1	0	—		—		21	0
Marília	Total		—		41	0	1	0	—		10	0	52	0
Athletic-MG	2023	Série D	3	0	—		—		—		—		3	0
Athletic-MG	2024	Série C	—		1	0	1	0	—		—		2	0
Athletic-MG	Total		3	0	1	0	1	0	—		—		5	0
Rio Claro	2025	Paulista A2	—		14	0	—		—		—		14	0
FC Cascavel	2025	Série D	13	0	—		—		—		3 (Note: Appearances in Taça FPF)	0	16	0
Juventus-SP	2026	Paulista A2	—		18	0	—		—		8	0	26	0
Career total			17	0	88	0	3	0	0	0	21	0	129	0

== Honours ==
Guarani

- Campeonato Paulista Série A2: 2018

ABC

- Campeonato Potiguar: 2020

Juventus-SP

- Campeonato Paulista Série A2: 2026
