= Daniel Cruz (footballer, born 2001) =

Brazilian footballer

Personal information
- Full name: Daniel dos Santos da Cruz
- Date of birth: 1 March 2001 (age 25)
- Place of birth: Salvador, Brazil
- Height: 1.80 m (5 ft 11 in)
- Position: Forward

Team information
- Current team: Athletico Paranaense

Youth career
- 2014–2021: Bahia

Senior career*
Years	Team	Apps	(Gls)
2021	Bahia	1	(0)
2021–	Athletico Paranaense	11	(1)
2022	→ Botafogo (loan)	2	(0)
2023	→ Juventude (loan)	17	(2)
2024	→ ABC (loan)	4	(2)
- * Club domestic league appearances and goals as of 16:46, 15 February 2024 (UTC)

Daniel dos Santos da Cruz (born 1 March 2001), known as Daniel Cruz or Daniel Bahia, is a Brazilian footballer who plays as a forward for Athletico Paranaense.

== Club career ==
Born in Salvador, Bahia, Daniel Cruz began his career at hometown side EC Bahia, initially joining their under-14 side. In April 2021, despite having issues regarding a contract renewal, he received his first call-up to the under-23 team which played in the year's Campeonato Baiano.

Daniel Cruz made his senior debut on 4 April 2021, coming on as a half-time substitute in a 2–1 home win over Atlético de Alagoinhas. It was his only senior appearance for the club, as he was later sent back to the under-20 squad after Bahia could not reach an agreement for his renewal.

On 24 September 2021, Daniel Cruz joined Athletico Paranaense. He made his first team – and Série A – debut on 9 December, replacing Jader late into a 1–1 away draw against Sport Recife.

On 12 April 2022, Daniel Cruz moved on loan to Botafogo, being initially assigned to the B-team.

== Career statistics ==
As of 27 June 2022.

Club	Season	League			State League		Cup		Continental		Other		Total	
Club	Season	Division	Apps	Goals	Apps	Goals	Apps	Goals	Apps	Goals	Apps	Goals	Apps	Goals
Bahia	2021	Série A	0	0	1	0	0	0	—		0	0	1	0
Athletico Paranaense	2021	Série A	1	0	—		—		—		—		1	0
Athletico Paranaense	2022	Série A	0	0	10	1	0	0	0	0	0	0	10	1
Athletico Paranaense	Total		1	0	10	1	0	0	0	0	0	0	11	1
Botafogo (loan)	2022	Série A	1	0	—		0	0	—		—		1	0
Career total			2	0	11	1	0	0	0	0	0	0	13	1
