= Gabriel Felix (footballer, born 1997) =

Brazilian footballer

Personal information
- Full name: Gabriel Luis Gonçalves Felix
- Date of birth: 2 December 1997 (age 28)
- Place of birth: Pedro Leopoldo, Brazil
- Height: 1.89 m (6 ft 2 in)
- Position: Goalkeeper

Team information
- Current team: Juventus-SP
- Number: 1

Youth career
- 2014–2016: Vila Nova

Senior career*
Years	Team	Apps	(Gls)
2014–2018	Vila Nova	3	(0)
2019	Grêmio Anápolis	0	(0)
2019	CEOV	0	(0)
2019–2020	Jaraguá	0	(0)
2020	São José-SP	5	(0)
2020–2021	Jaraguá	11	(0)
2021	Inhumas	10	(0)
2022	CEOV	4	(0)
2022–2023	Aparecidense	33	(0)
2024	Londrina	20	(0)
2025	CSA	21	(0)
2026–	Juventus-SP	8	(0)
- * Club domestic league appearances and goals as of 05:16, 21 April 2026 (UTC)

Gabriel Luis Gonçalves Felix (born 2 December 1997), known as Gabriel Felix or just Gabriel, is a Brazilian footballer who plays as a Goalkeeper for Juventus-SP.

== Career ==
Born in Pedro Leopoldo, Minas Gerais, Gabriel played for local sides before joining Vila Nova's youth sides in 2014. He made his first team debut at the age of 16 on 28 November 2014, starting in a 3–2 Série B away win over Portuguesa.

After being mainly used in the under-20 team, Gabriel was presented in the squad of Grêmio Anápolis in December 2018. He subsequently represented CEOV and Jaraguá, but failed to make an appearance for all three sides.

In October 2020, Gabriel moved to São José-SP, before returning to his previous side Jaraguá in December. He was announced at Inhumas on 2 October 2021, before returning to CEOV for the 2022 campaign.

On 15 February 2022, Gabriel returned to the state of Goiás after signing for Aparecidense. On 17 January 2024, he was announced at Londrina.

On 6 November 2024, Gabriel agreed to a deal with CSA. After managing to establish himself as a first-choice during the season, he moved to Juventus-SP on 1 December 2025.

== Career statistics ==
As of match played 22 August 2026

Appearances and goals by club, season and competition
Club	Season	League			State League		Cup		Continental		Other		Total	
Club	Season	Division	Apps	Goals	Apps	Goals	Apps	Goals	Apps	Goals	Apps	Goals	Apps	Goals
Vila Nova	2014	Série B	1	0	0	0	—		—		0	0	1	0
Vila Nova	2015	Série C	0	0	0	0	—		—		0	0	0	0
Vila Nova	2016	Série B	1	0	0	0	—		—		0	0	1	0
Vila Nova	2017	Série B	0	0	0	0	0	0	—		—		0	0
Vila Nova	2018	Série B	0	0	1	0	0	0	—		—		1	0
Vila Nova	Total		2	0	1	0	0	0	—		0	0	3	0
Grêmio Anápolis	2019	Goiano	—		0	0	—		—		—		0	0
CEOV	2019	Mato-Grossense	—		0	0	—		—		—		0	0
Jaraguá	2019	Goiano 2ª Divisão	—		0	0	—		—		—		0	0
Jaraguá	2020	Goiano	—		0	0	—		—		—		0	0
Jaraguá	2021	Série D	7	0	4	0	0	0	—		—		11	0
Jaraguá	Total		7	0	4	0	0	0	—		—		11	0
São José-SP	2020	Paulista 2ª Divisão	—		5	0	—		—		—		5	0
Inhumas	2021	Goiano 2ª Divisão	—		10	0	—		—		—		10	0
CEOV	2022	Série D	—		4	0	—		—		—		4	0
Aparecidense	2022	Série C	13	0	0	0	—		—		—		13	0
Aparecidense	2023	Série C	5	0	11	0	—		—		—		16	0
Aparecidense	Total		18	0	11	0	—		—		—		29	0
Londrina	2024	Série C	12	0	8	0	—		—		—		20	0
CSA	2025	Série C	19	0	2	0	4	0	—		3 (Note: One appearance in Copa Alagoas, two appearances in Copa do Nordeste)	0	28	0
Juventus-SP	2026	Paulista A2	—		8	0	—		—		1 (Note: Appearance(s) in Copa Paulista)	0	9	0
Career total			58	0	53	0	4	0	0	0	4	0	119	0

== Honours ==
Vila Nova

- Campeonato Brasileiro Série C: 2015

Jaraguá

- Campeonato Goiano Segunda Divisão: 2019

São José-SP

- Campeonato Paulista Segunda Divisão: 2020

Juventus-SP

- Campeonato Paulista Série A2: 2026
