= Nação Esportes =

Nação
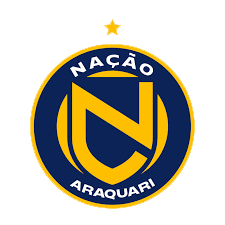
- Full name: Nação Esportes
- Nickname: Lions
- Founded: 1 September 2018; 7 years ago
- Ground: Arena Joinville
- Capacity: 22,400
- President: Tiago Reis
- Head coach: Kokan Gonçalves
- League: Campeonato Catarinense Série B
- 2025: Catarinense Série B, 7th of 9
Home colors	Away colors

Nação Esportes, simply known as Nação, is a Brazilian football club based in Joinville, Santa Catarina.

== History ==
Nação joined professional football since the 2019 season, being promoted to the Campeonato Catarinense Série B in 2020, with the runners-up in Série C. In 2021, the club played in the city of Canoinhas, returning to Joinville later.

== Appearances ==
Following is the summary of Nação appearances in Campeonato Catarinense.

Season	Division	Final position
2019	3rd	3rd
2020	3rd	2nd
2021	2nd	3rd
2022	2nd	3rd
2023	2nd	1st
2024	1st	12th (relegated)
2025	2nd	7th

== Honours ==
=== Official tournaments ===
State
Competitions	Titles	Seasons
Campeonato Catarinense Série B	1	2023

=== Runners-up ===
- Campeonato Catarinense Série C (1): 2020
