= Macário (footballer) =

Brazilian footballer

Personal information
- Full name: Matheus Moraes Macário de Souza
- Date of birth: 17 March 2001 (age 25)
- Place of birth: Rio de Janeiro, Brazil
- Height: 1.83 m (6 ft 0 in)
- Position: Forward

Team information
- Current team: Brusque

Youth career
- 2016–2020: America-RJ
- 2021: Grêmio

Senior career*
Years	Team	Apps	(Gls)
2021–2022	Olaria	17	(8)
2022	Ponte Preta	0	(0)
2023–2024	Volta Redonda	8	(0)
2023	→ Portuguesa-RJ (loan)	8	(3)
2024	Vitória-ES	6	(3)
2024	Olaria	23	(11)
2025	Bangu	8	(0)
2025	Altos	17	(6)
2026	Taubaté	14	(8)
2026–	Brusque	2	(1)
- * Club domestic league appearances and goals as of 22 April 2026

Matheus Moraes Macário de Souza (born 17 March 2001), simply known as Macário, is a Brazilian professional footballer who plays as a forward for Brusque.

== Career ==
Having spent most of his youth career at America-RJ, Macário began his professional career at Olaria. After a spell without games at Ponte Preta, he played for Volta Redonda and Portuguesa-RJ in his home state. In 2026 he stood out playing for Taubaté in the Paulista Série A2, and was subsequently signed with Brusque FC.
