= CA Votuporanguense =

Brazilian professional football club

Votuporanguense
- Full name: Clube Atlético Votuporanguense
- Nickname: CAV
- Founded: 11 December 2009; 16 years ago
- Ground: Arena Plínio Marin
- Capacity: 9,227
- President: Edilberto Santos Fiorentino
- Head coach: Rogério Corrêa
- League: Campeonato Paulista Série A2
- 2025: Paulista Série A2, 13th of 16
Home colors	Away colors

Clube Atlético Votuporanguense, commonly referred to as Votuporanguense, is a professional association football club based in Votuporanga, São Paulo, Brazil. The team competes in Campeonato Paulista Série A2, the second tier of the São Paulo state football league.

== History ==
The club was founded on December 11, 2009, and became a professional football club in 2010, competing, for the first time in a professional competition, in the 2010 Campeonato Paulista Segunda Divisão, eventually being eliminated in the Second Stage of the competition.

== Stadium ==
Clube Atlético Votuporanguense play their home games at Estádio Municipal Plínio Marin. The stadium has a maximum capacity of 9,227.

== Honours ==
- Copa Paulista
  - Winners (1): 2018
- Campeonato Paulista Série A3
  - Winners (1): 2024
- Campeonato Paulista Série A4
  - Winners (1): 2012
