= 2025 CA Juventus season =

Juventus 2025 football season

Juventus-SP
2025 season
- Chairman: Tadeu Deradeli
- Manager: Sérgio Soares (from 3 February 2024 until 8 March 2025)
- Stadium: Rua Javari
- Série A2: 11th
- Top goalscorer: League: Anderson Magrão; Rafael Costa; Rodrigo Carioca; Natan; All: Anderson Magrão (6)
Home colours	Away colours

The 2025 season is the 95th season in the history of Clube Atlético Juventus. It covers the period from January 2025 to May 2025. The Série A2 campaign began in the first half of January, with matches against Linense on the 15th.

== Squad ==
As of 8 May 2025

Note: Flags indicate national team as defined under FIFA eligibility rules; some limited exceptions apply. Players may hold more than one non-FIFA nationality.

No.	Pos.	Nation	Player
1	GK	BRA	André Dias
2	DF	BRA	Arthur Fernandes
3	DF	BRA	Fellipe Ferreira
4	DF	BRA	Guilherme Mattis
5	MF	BRA	Diogo Marzagão
6	DF	BRA	João Victor
7	FW	BRA	Natan
8	MF	BRA	Marcelinho
9	FW	BRA	Léo Castro
10	MF	BRA	Rafael Costa
11	MF	BRA	Cesinha
12	GK	BRA	Caio Alan
13	DF	BRA	Matheus Guedes
14	DF	BRA	Tiago Bahiano
15	DF	BRA	Léo Santos
16	MF	BRA	Pedrinho

No.	Pos.	Nation	Player
17	FW	BRA	Rodrigo Carioca
18	FW	BRA	Anderson Magrão
19	FW	BRA	Adson
20	DF	BRA	Gabriel Carioca
21	MF	BRA	Kauan
23	DF	BRA	Gabriel Vidal
24	MF	BRA	Henrique Miranda
-	MF	BRA	Joao Emanoel
-	FW	BRA	Fabrício
-	FW	BRA	Roger Vital
-	FW	BRA	Guilherme Morais
-	DF	BRA	Thiago Gasparetto
-	FW	BRA	Vinicius Soares
-	DF	BRA	Betinho
-	GK	BRA	Pedro Suzini

== Transfers ==
=== Transfers in ===
#	Position:	Player	Transferred from	Fee	Date	Team	Source
23	DF	(Brazil) Gabriel Vidal	(Brazil) Rio Branco-PR	Undisclosed	24 February 2025	First team	
	FW	(Brazil) Fabrício	(China) Guangxi Pingguo F.C.	Free agent	18 February 2025	First team	
17	FW	(Brazil) Rodrigo Carioca	(Brazil) Tombense	Undisclosed	1 January 2025	First team	
19	FW	(Brazil) Adson	(Brazil) Osasco Sporting	Undisclosed	1 January 2025	First team	
14	DF	(Brazil) Tiago Bahiano	(Brazil) Feirense	Free agent	27 November 2024	First team	
13	DF	(Brazil) Matheus Guedes	(Brazil) Cianorte	Free agent	1 January 2025	First team	
8	MF	(Brazil) Marcelinho	(Brazil) Sampaio Corrêa	Free agent	1 January 2025	First team	
6	DF	(Brazil) João Victor	(Brazil) Nova Iguaçu	Free agent	1 January 2025	First team	
18	FW	(Brazil) Anderson Magrão	(Brazil) Portuguesa	Free agent	27 November 2024	First team	
12	GK	(Brazil) Caio Alan	(Brazil) Ipatinga	Undisclosed	29 April 2025	First team	
20	DF	(Brazil) Gabriel Carioca	(Brazil) North EC	Undisclosed	1 January 2025	First team	
16	MF	(Brazil) Pedrinho	(Brazil) Patriotas-PR	Undisclosed	1 January 2025	First team	
4	DF	(Brazil) Guilherme Mattis	(Brazil) Nova Iguaçu	Undisclosed	1 January 2025	First team	
15	DF	(Brazil) Léo Santos	(Brazil) Brasil de Pelotas	Undisclosed	1 January 2025	First team	
3	DF	(Brazil) Fellipe Ferreira	(Brazil) Real Noroeste	Undisclosed	1 January 2025	First team	
5	MF	(Brazil) Diogo Marzagão	(Brazil) São José-SP	Undisclosed	18 November 2024	First team	
9	FW	(Brazil) Léo Castro	(Brazil) Água Santa	Undisclosed	1 January 2025	First team	
10	MF	(Brazil) Rafael Costa	(Brazil) União São João	Undisclosed	1 January 2025	First team	
	FW	(Brazil) Vinicius Soares	(Brazil) XV de Jaú	Undisclosed	1 January 2025	First team	

=== Transfers out ===
#	Position	Player	Transferred to	Fee	Date	Team	Source
13	DF	(Brazil) Matheus Guedes	(Brazil) Porto Vitória	Undisclosed	9 May 2025	First team	
6	DF	(Brazil) João Victor	(Brazil) XV de Novembro	Undisclosed	9 May 2025	First team	
	GK	(Brazil) Pedro Suzini	(Brazil) Batatais	Undisclosed	9 May 2025	First team	
1	GK	(Brazil) Caio Alan	(Brazil) Ipatinga	Undisclosed	8 March 2025	First team	
3	DF	(Brazil) Fellipe Ferreira	(Brazil) Ipatinga	Undisclosed	8 March 2025	First team	
16	DF	(Brazil) Pedrinho	(Brazil) Ipatinga	Undisclosed	8 March 2025	First team	
14	DF	(Brazil) Tiago Bahiano	(Brazil) Anapolina	Undisclosed	8 March 2025	First team	
5	MF	(Brazil) Diogo Marzagão	(Brazil) URT	Undisclosed	8 March 2025	First team	
	MF	(Brazil) Fabrício	(Brazil) Democrata-SL	Undisclosed	8 March 2025	First team	
2	DF	(Brazil) Arthur Fernandes	(Brazil) Bahia de Feira	Undisclosed	8 March 2025	First team	
20	DF	(Brazil) Gabriel Carioca	(Brazil) Guarani-MG	Undisclosed	8 March 2025	First team	
23	DF	(Brazil) Gabriel Vidal	(Brazil) Água Santa	Undisclosed	8 March 2025	First team	
18	FW	(Brazil) Anderson Magrão	(Brazil) North	Undisclosed	8 March 2025	First team	
17	FW	(Brazil) Rodrigo Carioca	(Brazil) Água Santa	Undisclosed	8 March 2025	First team	
17	FW	(Brazil) Vinicius Soares	(Brazil) America-RJ	Undisclosed	8 March 2025	First team	
19	FW	(Brazil) Adson	(Brazil) Tombense	Undisclosed	8 March 2025	First team	
11	MF	(Brazil) Cesinha	(Brazil) URT	Undisclosed	8 March 2025	First team	
15	DF	(Brazil) Léo Santos	(Brazil) Itabirito	Undisclosed	8 March 2025	First team	
	DF	(Brazil) Gustavo Silveira	(Brazil) VOCEM	Undisclosed	1 January 2025	First team	
	DF	(Brazil) Iago Motta	(Brazil) Mirassol	Undisclosed	1 January 2025	First team	
	MF	(Brazil) Zé Oliveira	(Brazil) São Bernardo	Undisclosed	1 January 2025	First team	
	FW	(Brazil) Thiago Rubim	(Brazil) Atlético Tubarão	Undisclosed	1 January 2025	First team	
	FW	(Brazil) Lissandro	(Brazil) Brasil de Pelotas	Undisclosed	1 January 2025	First team	
	MF	(Brazil) Valderrama	(Brazil) Altos	Undisclosed	8 January 2025	First team	
	MF	(Brazil) Guilherme Borges	(Brazil) ASA	Undisclosed	1 January 2025	First team	
	GK	(Brazil) Caio Alan	(Brazil) Botafogo-PB	Undisclosed	1 January 2024	First team	

=== Loans in ===
#	Position	Player	Loaned from	Date	Loan expires	Team	Source
7	FW	(Brazil) Natan	(Brazil) Petrópolis FC	1 January 2025	26 March 2025	First team	

== Squad statistics ==
As of 8 March 2025

No.	Pos.	Name	Campeonato Paulista Série A2		Copa Paulista		Total		Discipline	
No.	Pos.	Name	Apps	Goals	Apps	Goals	Apps	Goals	Yellow card	Red card
1	GK	(Brazil) André Dias	9	0	0	0	9	0	3	0
2	DF	(Brazil) Arthur Fernandes	4	0	0	0	4	0	0	0
3	DF	(Brazil) Fellipe Ferreira	7	1	0	0	7	1	3	0
4	DF	(Brazil) Guilherme Mattis	4	0	0	0	4	0	0	0
5	MF	(Brazil) Diogo Marzagão	14	0	0	0	14	0	5	0
6	DF	(Brazil) João Victor	14	1	0	0	14	1	2	0
7	FW	(Brazil) Natan	14	3	0	0	14	3	2	0
8	MF	(Brazil) Marcelinho	12	0	0	0	12	0	3	0
9	FW	(Brazil) Léo Castro	1	0	0	0	1	0	0	0
10	MF	(Brazil) Rafael Costa	6	4	0	0	6	4	1	0
11	MF	(Brazil) Cesinha	14	0	0	0	14	0	2	0
12	GK	(Brazil) Caio Alan	6	0	0	0	6	0	1	0
13	DF	(Brazil) Matheus Guedes	14	1	0	0	14	1	2	0
14	DF	(Brazil) Tiago Bahiano	10	0	0	0	10	0	1	0
15	DF	(Brazil) Léo Santos	12	0	0	0	12	0	2	0
16	MF	(Brazil) Pedrinho	9	0	0	0	9	0	2	0
17	FW	(Brazil) Rodrigo Carioca	14	3	0	0	14	3	5	0
18	FW	(Brazil) Anderson Magrão	15	6	0	0	15	6	2	0
19	FW	(Brazil) Adson	10	1	0	0	10	1	2	0
20	DF	(Brazil) Gabriel Carioca	7	0	0	0	7	0	0	0
21	DF	(Brazil) Kauan	0	0	0	0	0	0	0	0
23	DF	(Brazil) Gabriel Vidal	3	0	0	0	3	0	1	0
24	MF	(Brazil) Henrique Miranda	6	0	0	0	6	0	2	0
8	MF	(Brazil) Joao Emanoel	2	0	0	0	2	0	0	0
16	FW	(Brazil) Fabrício	5	0	0	0	5	0	0	0
19	FW	(Brazil) Roger Vital	4	0	0	0	4	0	1	1
-	FW	(Brazil) Guilherme Morais	0	0	0	0	0	0	0	0
-	DF	(Brazil) Thiago Gasparetto	0	0	0	0	0	0	0	0
-	FW	(Brazil) Vinicius Soares	9	0	0	0	9	0	3	0
-	DF	(Brazil) Betinho	10	0	0	0	10	0	1	0
-	GK	(Brazil) Pedro Suzini	0	0	0	0	0	0	0	1

=== Goals ===
As of 8 March 2025

Rank	Player	A2	CP	Total
1	(Brazil) Anderson Magrão	6	0	6
2	(Brazil) Rafael Costa	4	0	4
3	(Brazil) Rodrigo Carioca	3	0	3
3	(Brazil) Natan	3	0	3
4	(Brazil) Adson	1	0	1
4	(Brazil) Fellipe Ferreira	1	0	1
4	(Brazil) Matheus Guedes	1	0	1
4	(Brazil) João Victor	1	0	1
Own goals		1	0	1
Total		21	0	21

=== Assists ===
As of 8 March 2025

Rank	Player	A2	CP	Total
1	(Brazil) Cesinha	2	0	2
1	(Brazil) Natan	2	0	2
2	(Brazil) João Victor	1	0	1
2	(Brazil) Adson	1	0	1
2	(Brazil) Anderson Magrão	1	0	1
Total		7	0	7

=== Overall record ===
Competition	First match	Last match	Starting round	Final position	Record							
Competition	First match	Last match	Starting round	Final position	Pld	W	D	L	GF	GA	GD	Win %
Série A2	15 January 2025	5 April 2025	League phase	11th	15	4	7	4	21	19	+2	26.67
Total					15	4	7	4	21	19	+2	26.67

Source: Competitions

=== Campeonato Paulista Série A2 ===
==== Results summary ====
Overall								Home						Away					
Pld	W	D	L	GF	GA	GD	Pts	W	D	L	GF	GA	GD	W	D	L	GF	GA	GD
15	4	7	4	21	19	+2	19	3	4	1	16	12	+4	1	3	3	5	7	−2

Last updated: 25 May 2026.
Source: FPF

==== Matches ====
===== League first phase table =====
15 January 2025 1	Linense	1–0	Juventus-SP	Lins
19:30 UTC−3	Edson Cariús 3'	Report		Stadium: Gilbertão; Attendance: 1,611; Referee: Vinicius Gonçalves

19 January 2025 2	Juventus-SP	2–2	Rio Claro-SP	São Paulo
10:00 UTC−3	Rafael Costa 12' (pen.) 90+4'	Report	Denilson Silva 36' (pen.); Yamada 45+2'	Stadium: Rua Javari; Attendance: 2,533; Referee: Guilherme Nunes

22 January 2025 3	Juventus-SP	3–1	Portuguesa Santista	São Paulo
15:00 UTC−3	Natan 13'; Matheus Guedes 16'; Rafael Costa 38'	Report	Jonas 70'	Stadium: Rua Javari; Attendance: 670; Referee: Salim Fende

25 January 2025 4	Ituano	1–0	Juventus-SP	Itu
16:00 UTC−3	Matheus Mancini 7'	Report		Stadium: Novelli Júnior; Attendance: 1,031; Referee: Rodrigo Gomes

29 January 2025 5	Juventus-SP	2–3	Oeste	São Paulo
15:00 UTC−3	Rafael Costa 10'; Anderson Magrão 21'	Report	Paulinho 57'; Henry 62' 90+3' (pen.)	Stadium: Rua Javari; Attendance: 292; Referee: Douglas Flores

1 February 2025 6	Juventus-SP	4–3	Ferroviária	São Paulo
15:00 UTC−3	Natan 25'; Anderson Magrão 63' (pen.); Anderson Magrão 21' (o.g.); Rodrigo Carioca 77'	Report	Diego Quirino 6' 20'; Juninho 45'	Stadium: Rua Javari; Attendance: 1,296; Referee: Rodrigo Jr

5 February 2025 7	XV de Piracicaba	0–1	Juventus-SP	Piracicaba
20:00 UTC−3		Report	Anderson Magrão 51'	Stadium: Barão da Serra Negra; Attendance: 2,458; Referee: Juliano Rodrigues

9 February 2025 8	Juventus-SP	2–0	São José-SP	São Paulo
10:00 UTC−3	Anderson Magrão 3' 61'	Report		Stadium: Rua Javari; Attendance: 3,273; Referee: Gustavo Holanda

12 February 2025 9	Votuporanguense	1–1	Juventus-SP	Votuporanga
19:30 UTC−3	Jefinho 45+1'	Report	Anderson Magrão 87'	Stadium: Arena Plínio Marin; Attendance: 1,320; Referee: Fagson Jr

15 February 2025 10	São Bento	3–2	Juventus-SP	Sorocaba
16:00 UTC−3	Anderson Künzel 48' (pen.) 51' (pen.); Jailson 76'	Report	Rodrigo Carioca 74'; João Victor 81'	Stadium: Estádio Walter Ribeiro; Attendance: 1,139; Referee: Gabriel Furlan

19 February 2025 11	Juventus-SP	1–1	Grêmio Prudente	São Paulo
15:00 UTC−3	Adson 51'	Report	Douglas 77'	Stadium: Rua Javari; Attendance: 463; Referee: Caio Carvalho Pereira

22 February 2025 12	Santo André	1–1	Juventus-SP	Santo André
15:00 UTC−3	Juninho 48'	Report	Fellipe Ferreira 87'	Stadium: Estádio Bruno José Daniel; Attendance: 1,196; Referee: Gabriel Bispo

26 February 2025 13	Juventus-SP	2–2	Capivariano	São Paulo
15:00 UTC−3	Rodrigo Carioca 14'; Natan 42'	Report	Vinícius Popó 22'; Passari 57'	Stadium: Rua Javari; Attendance: 459; Referee: Rodrigo Fernandes Junior

2 March 2025 14	Taubaté	0–0	Juventus-SP	Taubaté
15:00 UTC−3		Report		Stadium: Joaquinzão; Attendance: 1,429; Referee: Thiago Mattos

8 March 2025 15	Juventus-SP	0–0	Primavera	São Paulo
15:00 UTC−3		Report		Stadium: Rua Javari; Attendance: 2,452; Referee: Renan Pantoja de Quequi
