= 1997 Campeonato Brasileiro Série C =

Campeonato Brasileiro Série C
- Season: 1997
- Champions: Sampaio Corrêa
- Promoted: Sampaio Corrêa; Juventus
- Matches played: 260
- Goals scored: 632 (2.43 per match)
- Top goalscorer: Marcelo Baron (Sampaio Corrêa) - 9 goals
- Biggest home win: Tupi 8-1 Avaí (October 12, 1997)

The football (soccer) Campeonato Brasileiro Série C 1997, the third level of Brazilian National League, was played from August 30 to November 30, 1997. The competition had 64 clubs and two of them were promoted to Série B.

== Stages of the competition ==
=== First phase ===
==== Group 1 ====
Pos	Team	Pld	W	D	L	GF	GA	GD	Pts	Qualification
1	(Amazonas (Brazilian state)) São Raimundo	6	4	1	1	10	6	+4	13	Qualified for the second phase
2	(Rondônia) Ji-Paraná	6	3	1	2	8	5	+3	10	Qualified for the second phase
3	Atlético Roraima	6	2	1	3	7	8	−1	7	
4	(Roraima) Baré	6	1	1	4	5	11	−6	4	

Source: rsssf.com

==== Group 2 ====
Pos	Team	Pld	W	D	L	GF	GA	GD	Pts	Qualification
1	(Maranhão) Sampaio Corrêa	6	5	1	0	12	3	+9	16	Qualified for the second phase
2	(Pará) Santa Rosa	6	3	1	2	11	10	+1	10	Qualified for the second phase
3	(Piauí) 4 de Julho	6	2	1	3	11	12	−1	7	
4	(Piauí) River	6	0	1	5	7	16	−9	1	

Source: rsssf.com

==== Group 3 ====
Pos	Team	Pld	W	D	L	GF	GA	GD	Pts	Qualification
1	(Ceará) Quixadá	6	3	3	0	8	3	+5	12	Qualified for the second phase
2	(Ceará) Ferroviário	6	3	2	1	8	3	+5	11	Qualified for the second phase
3	(Piauí) Picos	6	1	2	3	3	7	−4	5	
4	(Rio Grande do Norte) Potiguar de Mossoró	6	1	1	4	6	12	−6	4	

Source: rsssf.com

==== Group 4 ====
Pos	Team	Pld	W	D	L	GF	GA	GD	Pts	Qualification
1	(Alagoas) CSA	6	3	2	1	9	4	+5	11	Qualified for the second phase
2	(Pernambuco) Porto	6	1	5	0	8	6	+2	8	Qualified for the second phase
3	(Pernambuco) Vitória-PE	6	1	3	2	5	8	−3	6	
4	(Ceará) Fortaleza	6	1	2	3	4	8	−4	5	

Source: rsssf.com

==== Group 5 ====
Pos	Team	Pld	W	D	L	GF	GA	GD	Pts	Qualification
1	(Alagoas) ASA	6	5	1	0	10	1	+9	16	Qualified for the second phase
2	(Bahia) Juazeiro	6	2	0	4	7	7	0	6	Qualified for the second phase
3	(Pernambuco) Centro Limoeirense	6	1	3	2	2	5	−3	6	
4	(Pernambuco) Flamengo de Arcoverde	6	1	2	3	5	11	−6	5	

Source: rsssf.com

==== Group 6 ====
Pos	Team	Pld	W	D	L	GF	GA	GD	Pts	Qualification
1	(Sergipe) Confiança	6	3	3	0	11	6	+5	12	Qualified for the second phase
2	(Sergipe) Itabaiana	6	3	1	2	12	9	+3	10	Qualified for the second phase
3	(Bahia) Catuense	6	1	4	1	8	8	0	7	
4	(Bahia) Galícia	6	0	2	4	7	15	−8	2	

Source: rsssf.com

==== Group 7 ====
Pos	Team	Pld	W	D	L	GF	GA	GD	Pts	Qualification
1	(Goiás) Goiânia	6	3	2	1	8	5	+3	11	Qualified for the second phase
2	(Mato Grosso do Sul) Operário-MS	6	3	0	3	4	6	−2	9	Qualified for the second phase
3	(Mato Grosso) Operário-MT	6	2	2	2	9	5	+4	8	
4	(Mato Grosso) União Rondonópolis	6	1	2	3	3	8	−5	5	

Source: rsssf.com

==== Group 8 ====
Pos	Team	Pld	W	D	L	GF	GA	GD	Pts	Qualification
1	(Tocantins) Palmas	6	3	0	3	5	6	−1	9	Qualified for the second phase
2	(Federal District (Brazil)) Brasília	6	2	3	1	11	6	+5	9	Qualified for the second phase
3	(Tocantins) Tocantinópolis	6	2	2	2	5	6	−1	8	
4	(Federal District (Brazil)) Ceilandense	6	2	1	3	5	8	−3	7	

Source: rsssf.com

==== Group 9 ====
Pos	Team	Pld	W	D	L	GF	GA	GD	Pts	Qualification
1	(Minas Gerais) Tupi	6	3	2	1	7	4	+3	11	Qualified for the second phase
2	(Espírito Santo) Rio Branco-ES	6	3	1	2	6	5	+1	10	Qualified for the second phase
3	(Rio de Janeiro (state)) América-RJ	6	2	1	3	4	6	−2	7	
4	(Rio de Janeiro (state)) Campo Grande	6	0	4	2	1	3	−2	4	

Source: rsssf.com

==== Group 10 ====
Pos	Team	Pld	W	D	L	GF	GA	GD	Pts	Qualification
1	(São Paulo (state)) Juventus	6	4	2	0	12	6	+6	14	Qualified for the second phase
2	(São Paulo (state)) Atlético Sorocaba	6	4	1	1	10	6	+4	13	Qualified for the second phase
3	(São Paulo (state)) Portuguesa Santista	6	2	0	4	8	12	−4	6	
4	(São Paulo (state)) Rio Branco-SP	6	0	1	5	3	9	−6	1	

Source: rsssf.com

==== Group 11 ====
Pos	Team	Pld	W	D	L	GF	GA	GD	Pts	Qualification
1	(Minas Gerais) Uberlândia	6	5	1	0	16	2	+14	16	Qualified for the second phase
2	(Minas Gerais) Montes Claros	6	3	1	2	5	7	−2	10	Qualified for the second phase
3	(Goiás) Anápolis	6	1	2	3	6	9	−3	5	
4	(Goiás) Itumbiara	6	0	2	4	2	11	−9	2	

Source: rsssf.com

==== Group 12 ====
Pos	Team	Pld	W	D	L	GF	GA	GD	Pts	Qualification
1	(São Paulo (state)) Internacional de Limeira	6	4	0	2	11	10	+1	12	Qualified for the second phase
2	(Minas Gerais) Social	6	3	1	2	10	6	+4	10	Qualified for the second phase
3	(São Paulo (state)) São José-SP	6	3	1	2	11	8	+3	10	
4	(Minas Gerais) Villa Nova	6	1	0	5	5	13	−8	3	

Source: rsssf.com

==== Group 13 ====
Pos	Team	Pld	W	D	L	GF	GA	GD	Pts	Qualification
1	(São Paulo (state)) Francana	6	4	0	2	7	5	+2	12	Qualified for the second phase
2	(Paraná (state)) União Bandeirante	6	3	0	3	7	8	−1	9	Qualified for the second phase
3	(São Paulo (state)) América-SP	6	2	2	2	4	4	0	8	
4	(Paraná (state)) Maringá (Note: No relation to the present-day team of the same name.)	6	1	2	3	3	4	−1	5	

Source: rsssf.com

==== Group 14 ====
Pos	Team	Pld	W	D	L	GF	GA	GD	Pts	Qualification
1	(Paraná (state)) Ponta Grossa	6	4	0	2	5	3	+2	12	Qualified for the second phase
2	(Rio Grande do Sul) Internacional de Santa Maria	6	3	1	2	6	5	+1	10	Qualified for the second phase
3	(Santa Catarina (state)) Chapecoense	6	2	1	3	3	4	−1	7	
4	(Rio Grande do Sul) 15 de Novembro	6	1	2	3	4	6	−2	5	

Source: rsssf.com

==== Group 15 ====
Pos	Team	Pld	W	D	L	GF	GA	GD	Pts	Qualification
1	(Rio Grande do Sul) Caxias	6	3	3	0	10	5	+5	12	Qualified for the second phase
2	(Santa Catarina (state)) Avaí	6	2	1	3	7	7	0	7	Qualified for the second phase
3	(São Paulo (state)) Paulista	6	2	1	3	10	11	−1	7	
4	(Santa Catarina (state)) Blumenau	6	2	1	3	4	8	−4	7	

Source: rsssf.com

==== Group 16 ====
Pos	Team	Pld	W	D	L	GF	GA	GD	Pts	Qualification
1	(Santa Catarina (state)) Figueirense	6	4	1	1	14	11	+3	13	Qualified for the second phase
2	(Rio Grande do Sul) São José-RS	6	3	1	2	11	9	+2	10	Qualified for the second phase
3	(Rio Grande do Sul) Brasil de Pelotas	6	2	1	3	5	7	−2	7	
4	(Santa Catarina (state)) Tubarão	6	1	1	4	10	13	−3	4	

Source: rsssf.com

=== Second phase ===
Team 1	Agg.	Team 2	1st leg	2nd leg
Atlético Sorocaba	1–2	Montes Claros	1–1	0–1
Francana	6–2	Ponta Grossa	3–0	3–2
Internacional de Limeira	3–5	Uberlândia	2–3	1–2
Internacional de Santa Maria	1–2	União Bandeirante	0–0	1–2
Ferroviário	3–1	Porto	2–1	1–0
Rio Branco-ES	0–3	Confiança	0–0	0–3
São Raimundo	0–2	Santa Rosa	0–0	0–2
Sampaio Corrêa	2–1	Quixadá	1–1	1–0
CSA	2–1	Juazeiro	2–1	0–0
Itabaiana	4–1	ASA	2–1	2–0
Tupi	4–1	Brasília	2–1	2–0
São José-RS	1–5	Avaí	0–1	1–4
Figueirense	0–3	Caxias	0–1	0–2
Social	1–5	Juventus	1–2	0–3
Ji-Paraná	1–0	Operário-MS	1–0	0–0
Tocantinópolis	1–4	Goiânia	0–1	1–3

=== Round of 16 ===
Team 1	Agg.	Team 2	1st leg	2nd leg
Montes Claros	2–2(p)	Francana	1–1	1–1
União Bandeirante	2–2(p)	Uberlândia	1–1	1–1
Confiança	4–4(p)	Ferroviário	3–2	1–2
Santa Rosa	2–3	Sampaio Corrêa	0–0	2–3
CSA	5–4	Itabaiana	3–3	2–1
Tupi	8–5	Avaí	8–1	0–4
Juventus	3–0	Caxias	1–0	2–0
Goiânia	0–1	Ji-Paraná	0–0	0–1

=== Quarterfinals ===
Team 1	Agg.	Team 2	1st leg	2nd leg
Francana	4–3	Uberlândia	2–1	2–2
Ferroviário	0–5	Sampaio Corrêa	0–1	0–4
Tupi	2–1	CSA	1–0	1–1
Ji-Paraná	2–7	Juventus	0–3	2–4

=== Final stage ===
Pos	Team	Pld	W	D	L	GF	GA	GD	Pts	SMC	JUV	FRA	TUP
1	Sampaio Corrêa (P)	6	3	3	0	11	5	+6	12		1–1	3–1	3–0
2	Juventus (P)	6	2	2	2	9	8	+1	8	2–2		2–1	3–1
3	Francana	6	2	1	3	6	8	−2	7	1–1	1–0		1–2
4	Tupi	6	2	0	4	5	10	−5	6	0–1	2–1	0–1	

Source: rsssf.com
(P) Promoted to 1998 Série B

== Sources ==
- "Brazil Third Level 1997". rsssfbrasil.com. Archived from the original on 2020-01-04.
