= Clube Atlético Portal =

CAP Uberlândia
- Full name: Clube Atlético Portal
- Founded: 2010
- Ground: Estádio Parque do Sabiá, Uberlândia, Minas Gerais state, Brazil
- Capacity: 50,000
- Head Coach: Gilson Batata
Home colors	Away colors

Clube Atlético Portal, commonly known as CAP Uberlândia, is a Brazilian football club based in Uberlândia, Minas Gerais state.

== History ==
The club was founded in 2010 by Guillherme Ferriera and the former footballer Gilson Batata, who was also the club's first head coach and he also played a friendly game for the club. The club competed in 2011 in the Copa Amvap. The club debuted in professional football competitions on August 6, 2011, in a 2011 Campeonato Mineiro Segunda Divisão game against Araxá, at Estádio Parque do Sabiá. CAP and Araxá drew 1-1. Most of the CAP's players previously defended clubs such as Uberlândia Esporte Clube, Votuporanguense and Plácido de Castro.

== Stadium ==
Clube Atlético Portal play their home games at Estádio Parque do Sabiá. The stadium has a maximum capacity of 50,000 people.
