= Léo Baiano =

Brazilian footballer

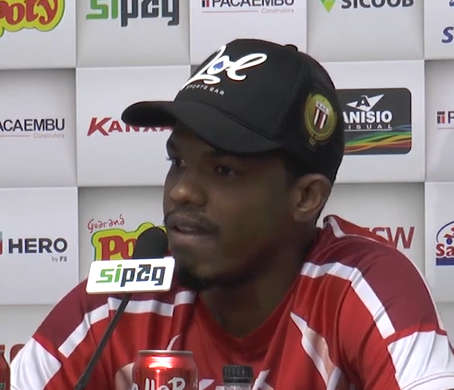
- Léo Baiano in 2018

Personal information
- Full name: Leonardo Lima dos Santos
- Date of birth: 10 February 1992 (age 34)
- Place of birth: Licínio de Almeida, Brazil
- Height: 1.80 m (5 ft 11 in)
- Position: Defensive midfielder

Team information
- Current team: Velo Clube

Youth career
- 2010: Funorte
- 2011: Cruzeiro

Senior career*
Years	Team	Apps	(Gls)
2012	Funorte	7	(0)
2013–2015	Montes Claros	35	(0)
2014	→ Funorte (loan)	11	(1)
2015	→ Boa Esporte (loan)	25	(0)
2016–2017	Boa Esporte	51	(2)
2018–2019	Mirassol	33	(0)
2018	→ Botafogo-SP (loan)	3	(0)
2019–2023	Novorizontino	100	(3)
2019	→ Paysandu (loan)	8	(0)
2023–2024	Figueirense	40	(4)
2025–	Velo Clube	4	(0)
- * Club domestic league appearances and goals as of 06:31, 26 January 2025 (UTC)

Leonardo Lima dos Santos (born 10 February 1992), known as Léo Baiano, is a Brazilian footballer who plays as a defensive midfielder for Velo Clube.

== Career ==
Born in Licínio de Almeida, Bahia, Léo Baiano played for Funorte and Cruzeiro as a youth, before making his senior debut with the former in the 2012 Campeonato Mineiro Segunda Divisão. In December of that year, he moved to Montes Claros, and helped the club to achieve promotion in the 2013 Segundona.

On 2 January 2015, after a short loan stint back at Funorte, Léo Baiano moved to Série B side Boa Esporte also on loan. He subsequently joined Boa permanently, but was unable to establish himself as a starter.

On 1 December 2017, Léo Baiano was presented at Mirassol for the upcoming season. In June of the following year, he was loaned to Botafogo-SP, before returning to his parent club in September.

On 26 April 2019, Léo Baiano moved to Novorizontino in the Série D. On 1 July, however, he was loaned to Paysandu, before returning to his parent club on 15 October.

Back to Novorizontino for the 2020 campaign, Léo Baiano was a regular starter during the club's two consecutive promotions, and signed a new one-year contract on 1 December 2022. The following 10 May, however, he joined Figueirense.

In November 2024, Léo Baiano was presented in the squad of Velo Clube for the 2025 Campeonato Paulista.

== Career statistics ==
As of 27 January 2025

Club	Season	League			State League		Cup		Continental		Other		Total	
Club	Season	Division	Apps	Goals	Apps	Goals	Apps	Goals	Apps	Goals	Apps	Goals	Apps	Goals
Funorte	2012	Mineiro 2ª Divisão	—		7	0	—		—		—		7	0
Montes Claros	2013	Mineiro 2ª Divisão	—		20	0	—		—		—		20	0
Montes Claros	2014	Mineiro Módulo II	—		15	0	—		—		—		15	0
Montes Claros	Total		—		35	0	—		—		—		35	0
Funorte (loan)	2014	Mineiro 2ª Divisão	—		11	1	—		—		—		11	1
Boa Esporte	2015	Série B	18	0	7	0	1	0	—		—		26	0
Boa Esporte	2016	Série C	13	0	10	0	—		—		—		23	0
Boa Esporte	2017	Série B	11	0	17	2	2	0	—		—		30	2
Boa Esporte	Total		42	0	34	2	3	0	—		—		79	2
Mirassol	2018	Série D	6	0	12	0	—		—		11 (Note: Appearance(s) in Copa Paulista)	0	29	0
Mirassol	2019	Paulista	—		15	0	—		—		—		15	0
Mirassol	Total		6	0	27	0	—		—		11	0	44	0
Botafogo-SP (loan)	2018	Série C	3	0	—		—		—		—		3	0
Novorizontino	2019	Série D	7	0	—		—		—		—		7	0
Novorizontino	2020	Série D	20	1	10	0	0	0	—		—		30	1
Novorizontino	2021	Série C	12	0	13	1	—		—		—		25	1
Novorizontino	2022	Série B	18	1	11	0	1	0	—		—		30	1
Novorizontino	2023	Série B	0	0	9	0	—		—		—		9	0
Novorizontino	Total		57	2	43	1	1	0	—		—		101	3
Paysandu (loan)	2019	Série C	8	0	—		—		—		4 (Note: Appearance(s) in Copa Verde)	2	12	2
Figueirense	2023	Série C	9	2	—		—		—		6 (Note: Appearance(s) in Copa Santa Catarina)	1	15	3
Figueirense	2024	Série C	18	1	13	1	—		—		3	0	34	2
Figueirense	Total		27	3	13	1	—		—		9	1	49	5
Velo Clube	2025	Paulista	—		4	0	—		—		—		4	0
Career total			143	5	174	5	4	0	0	0	24	1	345	11
