= Tiago Bahiano =

Brazilian footballer (born 1995)

Personal information
- Full name: Tiago José Santos
- Date of birth: September 18, 1995 (age 31)
- Place of birth: Bahia, Brazil
- Position: Defender

Team information
- Current team: GE Brasil

Senior career*
Years	Team	Apps	(Gls)
2019	Jacuipense	5	(0)
2019–2020	Vitória da Conquista	5	(0)
2021	Bahia de Feira	10	(0)
2021	Fluminense de Feira	8	(1)
2022	Vitória da Conquista	6	(0)
2022	Itabuna	7	(0)
2022	Vitória das Tabocas	9	(0)
2023	Nacional-PB	9	(0)
2023–2024	Uberlândia	28	(0)
2024	Boa Esporte	5	(0)
2024	Feirense	3	(0)
2025	Juventus-SP	10	(0)
2025–2026	Anapolina	21	(0)
2025	Vitória das Tabocas	9	(0)
2026-	GE Brasil	9	(0)
- * Club domestic league appearances and goals as of 22 August 2026

Tiago José Santos (born 18 September 1995), better known as Tiago Bahiano, is a Brazilian professional footballer who plays as a defender, primarily as a right-back.

== Club career ==
Born in Bahia, Tiago Bahiano began his senior career with Jacuipense in 2019, before moving to Vitória da Conquista the same year. He subsequently had spells with Bahia de Feira and Fluminense de Feira in 2021, before returning to Vitória da Conquista in 2022.

Later in 2022, he moved to Itabuna, with whom he won the Campeonato Baiano Second Division, before signing for Vitória das Tabocas in Pernambuco.

In 2023, Tiago Bahiano signed for Nacional-PB, before joining Uberlândia, with whom he remained through the 2023 and 2024 seasons. He also had a brief spell with Boa Esporte and Feirense in 2024.

Tiago Bahiano signed for Juventus-SP in 2025, before moving to Anapolina, with whom he won the Campeonato Goiano Second Division. He also had a loan spell at Vitória das Tabocas in 2025, where he won the Campeonato Pernambucano Second Division.

In March 2026, Tiago Bahiano signed for GE Brasil.

== Honours ==
Itabuna

- Campeonato Baiano Second Division: 2022

Vitória das Tabocas

- Campeonato Pernambucano Série A2: 2025

Anapolina

- Campeonato Goiano Second Division: 2025

== Career statistics ==
As of match played 12 August 2026

Appearances and goals by club, season and competition
Club	Season	League			Cup		State League		Other		Total	
Club	Season	Division	Apps	Goals	Apps	Goals	Apps	Goals	Apps	Goals	Apps	Goals
Jacuipense	2019	Série D	5	0	0	0	0	0	0	0	5	0
Vitória da Conquista	2019	Campeonato Baiano	0	0	0	0	9	0	0	0	9	0
Vitória da Conquista	2020	Série D	1	0	0	0	4	0	0	0	5	0
Vitória da Conquista	Total		1	0	0	0	13	0	0	0	14	0
Fluminense de Feira	2021	Campeonato Baiano	0	0	0	0	8	1	0	0	8	1
Bahia de Feira	2021	Série D	10	0	0	0	0	0	0	0	10	0
Vitória da Conquista	2022	Campeonato Baiano	0	0	0	0	6	0	0	0	6	0
Itabuna	2022	Baiano Second Division	0	0	0	0	7	0	0	0	7	0
Vitória das Tabocas	2022	Pernambucano Série A2	0	0	0	0	9	0	0	0	9	0
Nacional-PB	2023	Campeonato Pernambucano	0	0	0	0	9	0	0	0	9	0
Uberlândia	2023	Mineiro Módulo II	0	0	0	0	20	0	0	0	20	0
Uberlândia	2024	Campeonato Mineiro	8	0	0	0	0	0	0	0	8	0
Uberlândia	Total		8	0	0	0	20	0	0	0	28	0
Boa Esporte	2024	Mineiro Módulo II	0	0	0	0	0	0	5	0	5	0
Feirense	2024	Baiano Second Division	0	0	0	0	3	0	0	0	3	0
Juventus-SP	2025	Série A2	0	0	0	0	10	0	0	0	10	0
Anapolina	2025	Goiano Second Division	0	0	0	0	12	0	0	0	12	0
Anapolina	2026	Campeonato Goiano	0	0	0	0	9	0	0	0	9	0
Anapolina	Total		0	0	0	0	21	0	0	0	21	0
Vitória das Tabocas	2025	Pernambucano Série A2	0	0	0	0	9	0	0	0	9	0
GE Brasil	2026	Série D	9	0	0	0	0	0	4 (Note: Appearances in Copa FGF and Recopa Gaúcha)	0	13	0
Career total			33	0	0	0	115	1	9	0	157	1
