= Gabriel Carioca =

Brazilian footballer (born 1998)

Personal information
- Full name: Gabriel da Silva Flávio
- Date of birth: 12 January 1998 (age 28)
- Place of birth: Rio de Janeiro, Brazil
- Height: 1.87 m (6 ft 2 in)
- Position: Left-back

Team information
- Current team: Fluminense de Feira

Youth career
- 2014–2017: Grêmio

Senior career*
Years	Team	Apps	(Gls)
2018–2020	Atlético Tubarão	9	(0)
2019	→ Sergipe (loan)	5	(0)
2020–2023	Tombense	8	(0)
2021	→ Villa Nova-MG (loan)	12	(2)
2021	→ Juventus Jaraguá (loan)	0	(0)
2022	→ Nacional-MG (loan)	10	(1)
2022	→ Joinville (loan)	1	(0)
2022	→ Villa Nova-MG (loan)	6	(0)
2023	→ Pouso Alegre (loan)	7	(1)
2023	→ Uberlândia (loan)	16	(2)
2024	North	1	(0)
2024	Uberlândia	5	(1)
2025	Juventus-SP	7	(0)
2025	Guarani-MG	7	(0)
2026	Jequié-BA	5	(1)
2026–	Fluminense de Feira	10	(0)
- * Club domestic league appearances and goals as of 2 August 2026

Gabriel da Silva Flávio (born 12 January 1998), commonly known as Gabriel Carioca, is a Brazilian footballer who plays as a left-back for Fluminense de Feira.

Born in Rio de Janeiro, Gabriel came through the youth categories of Grêmio before moving to Santa Catarina, where he joined the academy of Atlético Tubarão. He was promoted to the first team squad at the end of 2018, having been highlighted by the club as a graduate of its base categories focused on gaining senior experience.

In 2019, while still registered with Atlético Tubarão, Gabriel was loaned to Sergipe, making five appearances in the Campeonato Brasileiro Série D.

Gabriel signed for Tombense in 2020, making eight appearances between the Campeonato Brasileiro Série C and the Campeonato Mineiro that year. In September 2020, he tested positive for COVID-19 and was withdrawn from Tombense's squad as a precautionary measure.

Gabriel spent the following three seasons away from Tombense on loan. In 2021, he joined Villa Nova-MG, helping the club win the Campeonato Mineiro Módulo II title with 12 appearances and two goals, before a brief spell with Juventus Jaraguá. In 2022, he was loaned in succession to Nacional-MG, Joinville, and back to Villa Nova-MG. His stint at Joinville ended in October 2022, when the club released him along with fifteen other players after being eliminated from the Copa Santa Catarina. In 2023, he had further loan spells with Pouso Alegre and Uberlândia, both in Minas Gerais.

Gabriel left Tombense at the end of his contract and, in 2024, played for North before returning to Uberlândia on a permanent basis, this time featuring in the top flight of the Campeonato Mineiro. In 2025, he moved to São Paulo state to join Juventus-SP in the Campeonato Paulista Série A2, before returning to Minas Gerais with Guarani-MG. In 2026, he moved to Bahia, representing Jequié-BA in the Campeonato Baiano before signing for Fluminense de Feira, with whom he won the Campeonato Baiano second division title.

== Career statistics ==
As of match played 2 August 2026

Appearances and goals by club, season and competition
Club	Season	League			Cup		Continental		State league		Other		Total	
Club	Season	Division	Apps	Goals	Apps	Goals	Apps	Goals	Apps	Goals	Apps	Goals	Apps	Goals
Atlético Tubarão	2019	Série D	0	0	0	0	—		6	0	3 (Note: Appearances in Copa Santa Catarina)	0	9	0
Sergipe (loan)	2019	Série D	5	0	—		—		—		—		5	0
Tombense	2020	Série C	7	0	—		—		1	0	—		8	0
Villa Nova-MG (loan)	2021	Mineiro Módulo II	0	0	—		—		12	2	—		12	2
Villa Nova-MG (loan)	2022	Mineiro Módulo II	0	0	—		—		6	0	—		6	0
Villa Nova-MG (loan)	Total		0	0	0	0	—		18	2	—		18	2
Nacional-MG (loan)	2022	Mineiro Módulo II	0	0	—		—		10	1	—		10	1
Joinville (loan)	2022	Campeonato Catarinense	0	0	—		—		—		1	0	1	0
Pouso Alegre (loan)	2023	Campeonato Mineiro	0	0	—		—		7	1	—		7	1
Uberlândia (loan)	2023	Mineiro Módulo II	0	0	—		—		16	2	—		16	2
Uberlândia (loan)	2024	Campeonato Mineiro	0	0	—		—		5	1	—		5	1
Uberlândia (loan)	Total		0	0	—		—		21	3	—		21	3
North EC	2024	Mineiro Módulo II	0	0	—		—		1	0	—		1	0
Juventus-SP	2025	Série A2	0	0	—		—		7	0	—		7	0
Guarani-MG	2025	Mineiro Módulo II	0	0	—		—		7	0	—		7	0
Jequié-BA	2026	Campeonato Baiano	0	0	—		—		5	1	—		5	1
Fluminense de Feira	2026	Baiano 2. Div	0	0	—		—		10	0	—		10	0
Career total			12	0	0	0	0	0	93	8	4	0	109	8

== Honours ==
Villa Nova-MG

- Campeonato Mineiro Módulo II: 2021

Fluminense de Feira

- Campeonato Baiano 2ª Divisão: 2026
