= 2026 Mamoré-Uberlândia football match incident =

2026 football match incident

- Event: Campeonato Mineiro Under-20 Second Division
Uberlândia	Mamoré
1	3
- Date: 1 November 2026
- Venue: Estádio Parque do Sabiá, Uberlândia
- Referee: Fernando Patrick Drosghic Modesto

The 2026 Mamoré-Uberlândia football match incident occurred during an association football match played on 1 November 2026 between Uberlândia and Mamoré, as the first leg of the semi-finals of the Campeonato Mineiro Under-20 Second Division. The match was held at the Estádio Parque do Sabiá in Uberlândia, Minas Gerais, Brazil, and ended in a 3–1 victory for Mamoré.

The match was abandoned following a mass brawl that resulted in 53 red-card dismissals, which became the world record for the most red cards given in one match.

== Background ==
The Campeonato Mineiro Under-20 Second Division is an under-20 football competition organised by the Federação Mineira de Futebol (FMF), the governing body for football in Minas Gerais.

== Incident ==
Early in the second half, several Uberlândia officials invaded the field of play after one of their players was sent off. The match was then paused for 40 minutes before restarting.

Mamoré’s Joao Vitor subsequently scored in the ninth minute of stoppage time, giving them a 3-1 lead. During the goal celebrations, Mamoré player Davi Fernandes Bittencourt taunted Uberlândia players. A brawl broke out after Uberlândia goalkeeping coach Paulo Sérgio Dias Dos Santos ran onto the pitch to confront him, and referee Fernando Patrick Drosghic Modesto awarded all 40 remaining players of both teams red cards, after 3 players had been previously sent off. 2 Uberlândia board members and 8 members of coaching staff were also sent off, including two head coaches, an assistant coach, fitness coach, a physio, a masseur and two goalkeeping coaches. In total, 53 people received red cards, exceeding the previous world record of 36, which occurred during an Argentinian fifth division match between Atlético Claypole and Victoriano Arenas in February 2011. According to the referee’s match report, he was unable to show all the red cards due to the commotion and the lack of security. The referee subsequently abandoned the match.

== Aftermath ==
Following the match, Uberlândia officials damaged equipment belonging to Mamoré, and Mamoré team members vandalised the home dressing room. Drosghic Modesto additionally stated that multiple people directed death threats and other threats of violence towards him. Due to extensive damage to the stadium, the military police was called. The police report referenced 14 broken doors, damaged shower facilities, broken windows and that benches, tables and chairs had been destroyed.

Uberlândia announced it would be forfeiting the second leg of the semifinal in a "gesture of fair play," as Mamoré had insufficient eligible players to field a team. As a result, Mamoré progressed to the final.
