= Gilson Batata =

Brazilian footballer (born 1967)

Personal information
- Full name: Gilson Pires da Silva
- Date of birth: 27 September 1967 (age 59)
- Place of birth: Santa Bárbara d'Oeste, Brazil
- Position: Forward

Youth career
- 1982–1985: União Barbarense

Senior career*
Years	Team	Apps	(Gls)
1986–1987	Catanduvense		
1988	Atlético Goianiense		
1989	Goiás		
1989	Atlético Goianiense		
1990	Atlético Madrid B		
1990	Rio Branco-SP		
1990–1992	Atlético Goianiense		
1991	→ São José-SP (loan)		
1992	Rio Branco-SP		
1993	Bahia		
1994	Sãocarlense		
1994	Paraná		
1995	Santo André		
1996	Caldense		
1996	Bragantino		
1997	Rio Branco-SP		
1997	Remo		
1997	São José-SP		
1998	União Barbarense		
1998–1999	Guarani		
1999	Etti Jundiaí		
2000	Matonense		
2000	Atlético Paranaense		
2001	Matonense		
2001	Sport Recife		
2001	Figueirense		
2002	Santo André		
2002	Avaí		
2002	Mogi Mirim		
2003	União Barbarense		
2003	Uberaba		
2003	Brasiliense		
2004	Mogi Mirim		
2004	Ituiutaba		
2005	União Barbarense		
2007	União São João		
2007	Uberlândia		
2008	Uberaba		
2011	CAP Uberlândia		

Managerial career
- 2006: União Barbarense (caretaker)
- 2008: União Barbarense
- 2008: Itapirense
- 2011: CAP Uberlândia
- 2012: Ituiutabana
- 2013: Atlético Tricordiano
- 2013: Uberaba
- 2014: Democrata-SL
- * Club domestic league appearances and goals as of 2 October 2023

Gilson Pires da Silva (born 27 September 1967), better known as Gilson Batata, is a Brazilian former professional footballer and manager, who played as a forward. He is known in Brazilian football as "O Andarilho da Bola" (English: The Football Wanderer), due to the huge number of clubs he played for over the years.

== Career ==
Gilson Batata began his career in the youth sectors of União Barbarense, in 1982. His first professional contract was with GE Catanduvense, a club he played for in 1986 and 1987, and in 1988, at Atlético Goianiense, he was state champion for the first time. He had a brief spell at Goiás and in 1990, he ended up being traded to Atlético Madrid, becoming part of the club's B team. Unsuccessful in Spain, he returned to Atlético Goianiense, where he was again champion, this time of Brasileiro Serie C in 1990.

Gilson passed through Rio Branco, Bahia and Sãocarlense, until arriving in Paraná in 1994, where he was part of the state champion squad that year. He moved to countless other clubs until returning to his formative club, União Barbarense, in 1998, where he was champion and top scorer in the Série A2. In 2000, he was again champion of the Campeoanto Paranaense, this time with Atlético Paranaense, a team for which he also played in the Copa Libertadores that season. In 2001 he competed in the Campeonato Paulista for Matonense, and the Campeonato Brasileiro for Sport Recife. In September of that year, he was signed by Figueirense FC.

Only conquered a cup again in the 2003 season, this time with Uberaba SC, in Módulo II of Minas Gerais, club for which he ended his career for the first time in 2008, when he definitively became a manager. In 2011, he played at the age of 43 for CAP Uberlândia, a club that Gilson helped to establish.

== Managerial career ==
Gilson began his coaching career in 2006 at União Barbarense as a caretaker for one match. He returned to the club in 2008, a season in which he also led SE Itapirense in the Copa Paulista.

Afterwards, he only coached clubs in Minas Gerais, starting with CAP Uberlândia, a team he helped found, and Ituiutabana, Atlético Tricordiano, Uberaba and Democrat-SL. He did not win titles as a coach.

== CAP Uberlândia ==
On 5 April 2010, Gilson Batata was one of the founders of Clube Atlético Portal, which became known as CAP Uberlândia, a team that competed in the minor divisions of Minas Gerais from 2011 to 2020, and was champion of the Campeonato Mineiro Segunda Divisão in 2014. He was the club's first coach, in addition to having played professionally for the last time with the team.

== Personal life ==
Gilson currently lives in Uberlândia, where he has a football school.

== Honours ==
Atlético Goianiense

- Campeonato Goiano: 1988
- Campeonato Brasileiro Série C: 1990

Paraná

- Campeonato Paranaense: 1994

União Barbarense

- Campeonato Paulista Série A2: 1998

Athletico Paranaense

- Campeonato Paranaense: 2000

Uberaba

- Campeonato Mineiro Módulo II: 2003

Individual

- 1998 Campeonato Paulista Série A2 top scorer: 18 goals
- 2003 Campeonato Mineiro Módulo II top scorer: 14 goals
