= Anderson Magrão =

Brazilian footballer (born 1988)

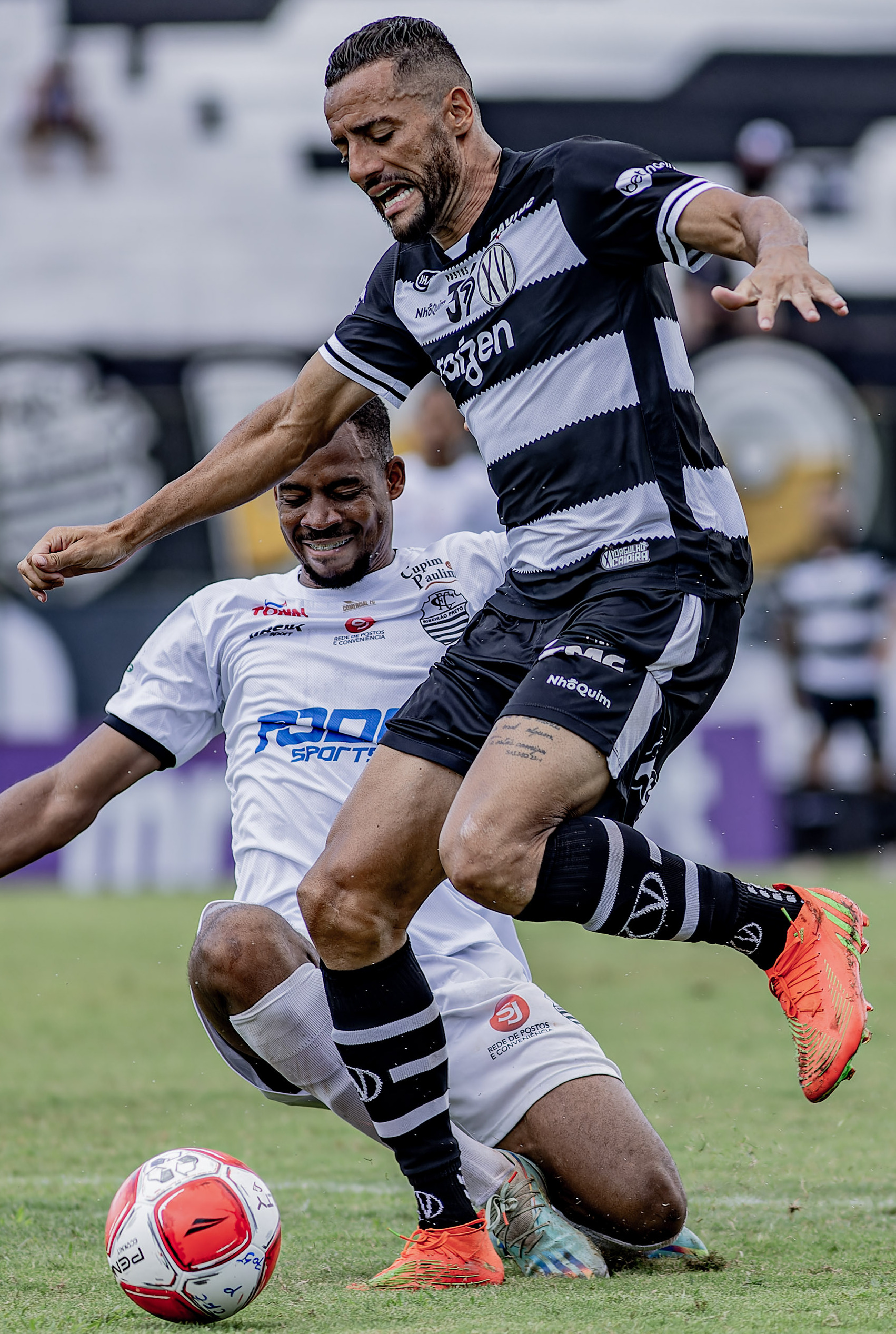
- Magrão playing for XV de Piracicaba in 2024

Personal information
- Full name: Anderson Portela de Araújo
- Date of birth: 31 January 1988 (age 38)
- Place of birth: Resende, Brazil
- Height: 1.90 m (6 ft 3 in)
- Position: Forward

Team information
- Current team: Paulista

Youth career
- São Caetano

Senior career*
Years	Team	Apps	(Gls)
2009	Jaboticabal	1	(0)
2011	EC São Bernardo	13	(0)
2013	River Plate Asunción		
2014	Socorrense		
2015	São Bernardo	6	(0)
2016	Nacional-SP	9	(2)
2017	Votuporanguense	12	(2)
2018	Portuguesa Santista	21	(3)
2018/2019	Ideal	9	(0)
2019	Barretos	13	(5)
2019	Velo Clube	0	(0)
2020	Barretos	11	(5)
2020	Vitória-ES	17	(2)
2021	São José-SP	15	(4)
2021	Taubaté	0	(0)
2022	União Frederiquense	10	(0)
2022	URT	14	(4)
2023	São Caetano	14	(6)
2023	Uberlândia	21	(8)
2023	Portuguesa Santista	0	(0)
2024	XV de Piracicaba	17	(6)
2024	CRAC	14	(1)
2024	Portuguesa	0	(0)
2025	Juventus-SP	15	(6)
2025	North	15	(3)
2025	XV de Piracicaba	0	(0)
2026	Brasiliense	10	(1)
2026–	Paulista	0	(0)
- * Club domestic league appearances and goals as of 14:46, 26 August 2024 (UTC)

Anderson Portela de Araújo (born 31 January 1988), known as Anderson Magrão, is a Brazilian footballer who plays as a forward for Paulista.

== Career ==
Born in Resende, Rio de Janeiro, Magrão was a São Caetano youth graduate. After making his senior debut with Jaboticabal in 2009, he played for other clubs in the São Paulo state before moving to amateur football in 2013.

After playing in Paraguay with River Plate Asunción, Magrão represented São Bernardo in the 2015 Campeonato Paulista, but subsequently moved back to amateur football after being unemployed. After spending the 2016 season at Nacional-SP, he joined Votuporanguense on 23 November of that year.

On 19 December 2017, Magrão was presented at Portuguesa Santista. A regular starter, he moved to Campeonato de Portugal side Sporting Ideal in September 2018.

On 7 February 2019, after agreeing to a deal with Comercial-SP, Magrão joined Barretos. He moved to Velo Clube on 2 August, before returning to Barretos for the upcoming campaign.

On 7 August 2020, Magrão agreed to a deal with Vitória-ES in the Série D. In the 2021 season, he represented São José-SP and Taubaté.

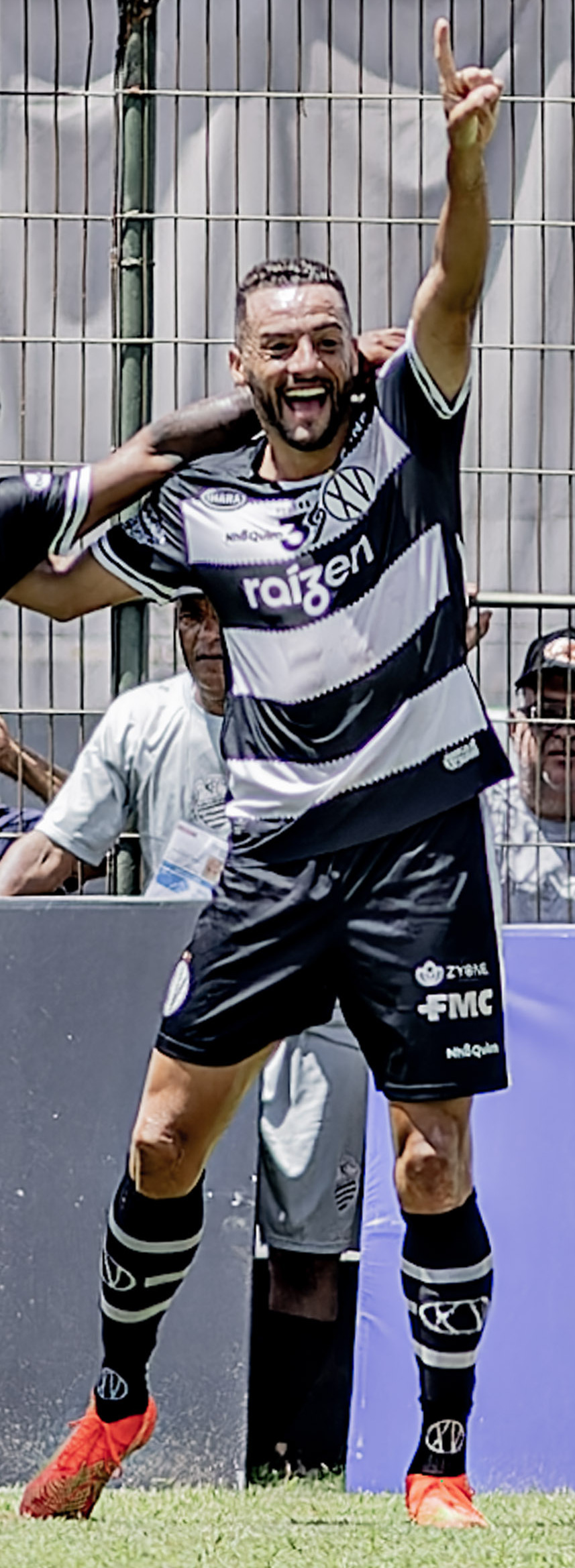
Magrão celebrating a goal with XV de Piracicaba in 2024

In the following two years, Magrão played for União Frederiquense, URT, São Caetano and Uberlândia before returning to Portuguesa Santista in August 2023. After winning the year's Copa Paulista, he joined XV de Piracicaba on 21 November of that year.

On 16 April 2024, Magrão signed for fourth division side CRAC. On 22 August, he was announced at Portuguesa for the state cup.

== Career statistics ==
As of match played 18 July 2026

Appearances and goals by club, season and competition
Club	Season	League			State League		Cup		Continental		Other		Total	
Club	Season	Division	Apps	Goals	Apps	Goals	Apps	Goals	Apps	Goals	Apps	Goals	Apps	Goals
Jaboticabal	2009	Paulista 2ª Divisão	—		1	0	—		—		—		1	0
EC São Bernardo	2010	Paulista 2ª Divisão	—		6	0	—		—		—		6	0
EC São Bernardo	2011	Paulista 2ª Divisão	—		7	0	—		—		—		7	0
EC São Bernardo	Total		0	0	13	0	0	0	0	0	0	0	13	0
São Bernardo	2015	Paulista	—		6	0	—		—		—		6	0
Nacional-SP	2016	Paulista A3	—		9	2	—		—		18 (Note: Appearance(s) in Copa Paulista)	3	27	5
Votuporanguense	2017	Paulista A2	—		12	2	—		—		—		12	2
Portuguesa Santista	2018	Paulista A3	—		21	3	—		—		—		21	3
SC Ideal	2018–19	Campeonato de Portugal	9	0	—		1	0	—		—		10	0
Barretos	2019	Paulista A3	—		13	5	—		—		—		13	5
Velo Clube	2019	Paulista A3	—		—		—		—		4	2	4	2
Barretos	2020	Paulista A3	—		11	5	—		—		—		11	5
Vitória-ES	2020	Série D	14	2	3	0	—		—		—		17	2
São José-SP	2021	Paulista A3	—		15	4	—		—		—		15	4
Taubaté	2021	Paulista A2	—		—		—		—		7	1	7	1
União Frederiquense	2022	Gaúcho	—		10	0	—		—		—		10	0
URT	2022	Série D	14	4	—		—		—		—		14	4
São Caetano	2023	Paulista A2	—		14	6	—		—		—		14	6
Uberlândia	2023	Mineiro Módulo II	—		21	8	—		—		—		21	8
Portuguesa Santista	2023	Paulista A2	—		—		—		—		8	2	8	2
XV de Piracicaba	2024	Paulista A2	—		17	6	—		—		—		17	6
CRAC	2024	Série D	14	1	—		—		—		—		14	1
Portuguesa	2024	Paulista	—		—		—		—		6	1	5	1
Juventus-SP	2025	Paulista A2	—		15	6	—		—		—		15	6
North	2025	Mineiro Módulo II	—		15	3	—		—		—		15	3
XV de Piracicaba	2025	Paulista A2	—		—		—		—		7	0	7	0
Brasiliense	2026	Série D	3	0	7	1	—		—		—		10	1
Paulista	2026	Série A3	—		—		—		—		1	0	1	0
Career total			54	7	203	51	1	0	0	0	51	9	309	67

== Honours ==
Portuguesa Santista

- Copa Paulista: 2023
