= Kléberson =

Brazilian footballer

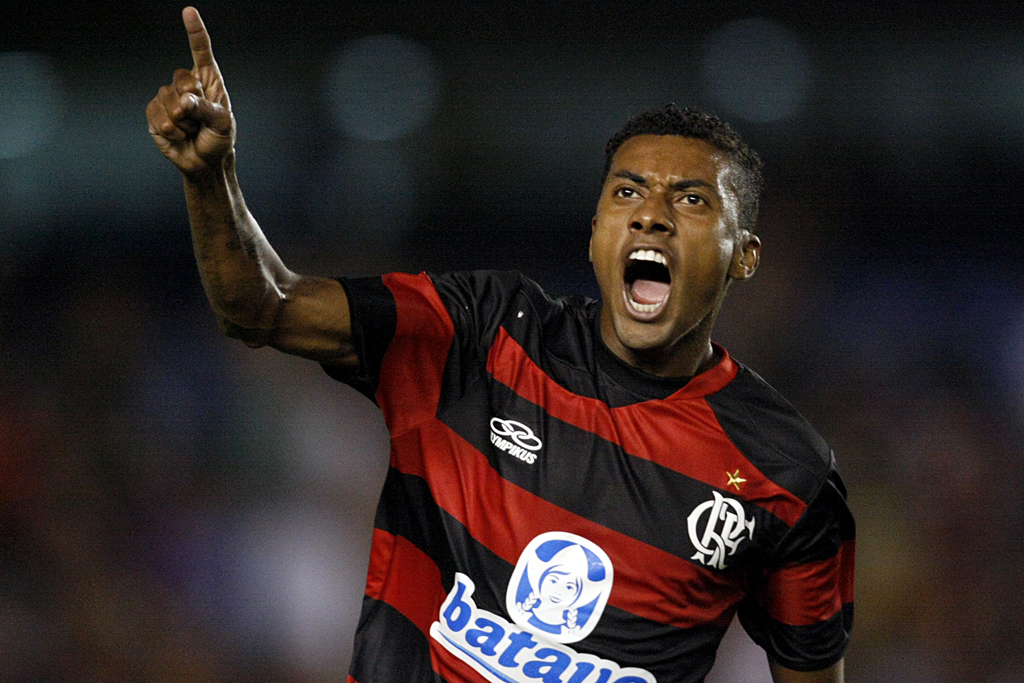
- Kléberson playing for Flamengo in 2010

Personal information
- Full name: José Kléberson Pereira
- Date of birth: 19 June 1979 (age 47)
- Place of birth: Uraí, Brazil
- Height: 5 ft 9 in (1.75 m)
- Position: Midfielder

Team information
- Current team: North (head coach)

Senior career*
Years	Team	Apps	(Gls)
1999–2003	Atlético Paranaense	100	(12)
2003–2005	Manchester United	20	(2)
2005–2007	Beşiktaş	45	(3)
2007–2012	Flamengo	63	(9)
2011	→ Atlético Paranaense (loan)	18	(2)
2012–2013	Bahia	19	(2)
2013	→ Philadelphia Union (loan)	11	(1)
2014–2015	Indy Eleven	21	(8)
2016	Fort Lauderdale Strikers	5	(0)
Total		302	(39)

International career
2002–2010	Brazil	32	(2)

Managerial career
- 2022: Philadelphia Union II (assistant)
- 2022–2023: New York City FC (assistant)
- 2026–: North
Medal record
Men's football
Representing Brazil
FIFA World Cup
Winner	2002 Korea/Japan
Copa América
Winner	2004 Peru
FIFA Confederations Cup
Winner	2009 South Africa
- * Club domestic league appearances and goals

José Kléberson Pereira (born 19 June 1979), commonly known as José Kléberson or simply Kléberson, is a Brazilian football coach and former player who is currently the head coach of North.

A former midfielder, he won the Campeonato Brasileiro Série A with his first club Atlético Paranaense in 2001, as well as the Campeonato Paranaense twice. He spent two years each at Manchester United and Beşiktaş, winning the Turkish Cup twice with the latter. Returning to Brazil, he won another national title with Flamengo in 2009, and ended his career after playing for three clubs in the United States.

Kléberson played for Brazil 32 times between 2002 and 2010, scoring two goals. He was part of the squads that won the 2002 FIFA World Cup, 2004 Copa América and 2009 FIFA Confederations Cup. In the 2002 FIFA World Cup final, Kléberson gave the assist to Ronaldo Nazário's second goal.

== Club career ==
=== Atlético Paranaense ===
Kléberson was born and raised in the provincial town of Uraí in the southern Brazilian state of Paraná. He began his football career with Atlético Paranaense. There, Kléberson won the Paraná State League in 2000 and 2001, and the Brazilian Série A title in 2001. His performances for Atlético Paranaense led to Luiz Felipe Scolari calling him up to the Brazil national team for the 2002 FIFA World Cup in South Korea and Japan.

In January 2003, Leeds United manager Terry Venables wished to use the funds from the £7 million sale of Robbie Fowler to sign Kléberson for £4 million, covering the departures of Lee Bowyer and Olivier Dacourt. Kléberson said he would not leave Brazil until he got married on 14 February, later clarifying that he intended to be presented in England and then return to Brazil for his wedding. Fowler's move to Manchester City was delayed, leaving Leeds with insufficient funds. Newcastle United manager Sir Bobby Robson then intended to sign Kléberson as well as Leeds' Jonathan Woodgate, but negotiations collapsed as Atlético Paranaense president Mário Celso Petraglia considered a bid of US$2 million to be insulting.

=== Manchester United ===
On 12 August 2003, Manchester United signed Kléberson for a fee of £6.5 million on 12 August 2003. He became the first Brazilian to sign for United, and replaced Juan Sebastián Verón, who had signed for Chelsea. He made his debut on 27 August in a 1–0 home win over Wolverhampton Wanderers, in which he and fellow new signing Cristiano Ronaldo were substituted after 67 minutes for the experienced Paul Scholes and Ryan Giggs. Four days later, he was taken off with a dislocated shoulder in a loss by the same score away to Southampton. Kléberson was injured in his second appearance for the club and made only 20 appearances in two seasons. He scored two league goals in his time at Manchester United, both coming in home wins — against Blackburn Rovers and Everton.

In 2019, Kléberson told FourFourTwo that he joined Manchester United as he believed international teammate Ronaldinho would sign alongside him. He also said that he should have gone on loan to another English club instead of leaving for Turkey in 2005.

=== Beşiktaş ===
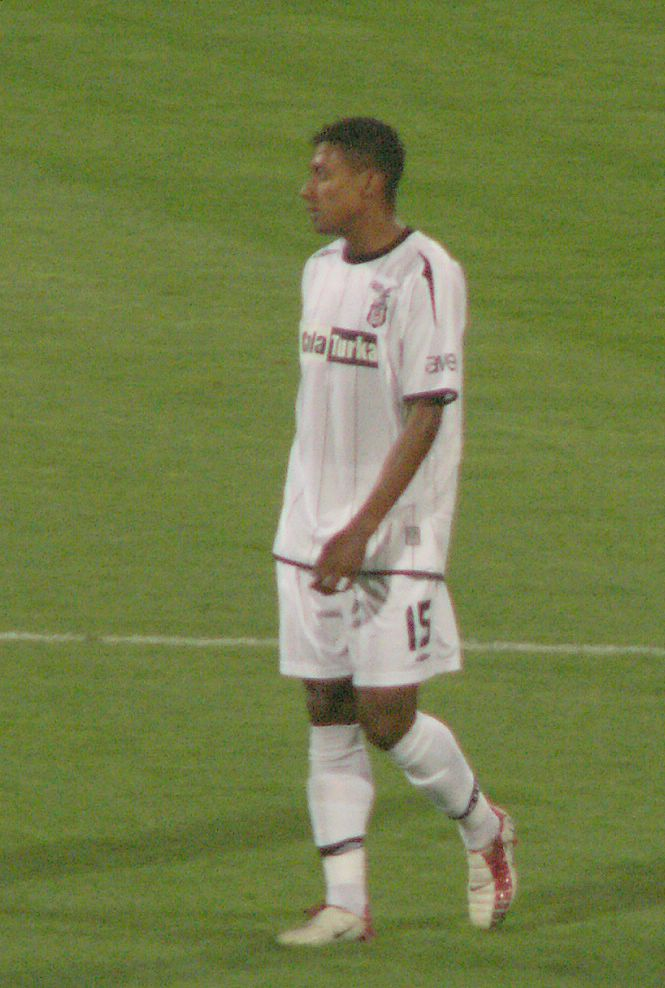
Kléberson playing for Beşiktaş in 2006

On 6 August 2005, Kléberson signed for Turkish club Beşiktaş for €2.95 million. He signed a three-year deal, with the option of a further 12 months, and said that compatriot Aílton had persuaded him to move.

Kléberson unilaterally terminated the contract after claiming the club failed to pay his wages on time.

=== Flamengo ===
Kléberson signed with Flamengo on 27 September 2007 as a free agent, but he was unable to play for the club until February 2008, due to problems related to his resignation from Beşiktaş. On 10 August 2007 (announced on 27 August), the FIFA Dispute Resolution Chamber passed a decision that Kléberson had to pay Beşiktaş €3.18 million as for the compensation of breach of contract. and Besiktas had to pay US$461,112 as outstanding wage. Furthermore, Kléberson was suspended for four months (retroactively from 27 September 2007) Kléberson and the club later agreed to reduce the compensation from €3.18 million to €1 million.

Kléberson's first matches for his new club were on the reserves team in several matches of the Rio State League. His climb to the first team started slowly as he began to play consistently in the Copa Libertadores. Kléberson earned an important spot in the midfield after the transfers of Renato Augusto and Marcinho.

After returning to the first team, Kléberson's good spell in 2009 was interrupted on 12 August, in a friendly match against Estonia, where he suffered a foul and fell, causing him a dislocated shoulder. Kléberson had surgery and was expected to miss the rest of the year. He managed to recover quickly being able to return on 22 November in a 0–0 draw against Goiás and also playing in the 2–1 win over Grêmio and winning the 2009 Brazilian Série A, the second in his career.

In the 2010 pre-season, Palmeiras speculated the possibility of involving Kléberson in a trade for Vágner Love, but Flamengo refused to accept the idea.

=== Bahia ===
After a poor year playing on loan for Atlético Paranaense, when the club was relegated to Série B, Kléberson signed for Bahia on a two-year contract in July 2012. He scored his first goal for Bahia on his debut, against his former club Flamengo.

=== Later career in the U.S. ===
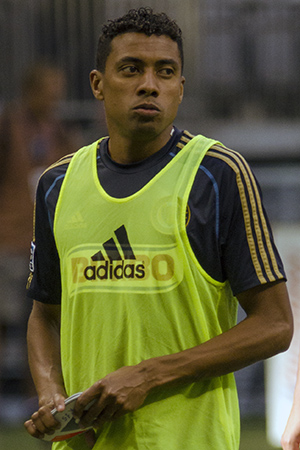
Kléberson in 2013

Kléberson was acquired on loan by the Philadelphia Union of Major League Soccer (MLS) on 25 March 2013. He scored the game-winning goal in the 95th minute from a free kick against Toronto FC on 10 October 2013. On 25 March 2014, Kléberson signed a two-year deal with Indy Eleven of the North American Soccer League (NASL). He was released in December 2015, and signed with Fort Lauderdale Strikers of the same league on 4 January.

== International career ==
Kléberson made his first international appearance for Brazil in a friendly match against Bolivia on 31 January 2002. He also marked his debut by scoring Brazil's fourth goal in a 6–0 win. He also scored against Iceland in March 2002. He was subsequently selected by Luiz Felipe Scolari for Brazil's squad for the 2002 FIFA World Cup. He was initially relegated to the bench for the first four matches in the tournament. He was brought into the starting line-up for Brazil's game against England, with Scolari feeling his tenacity would help counter the high work-rate of the English side. His tackle on his future teammate Paul Scholes led to Brazil's equaliser before Brazil ended up winning 2–1. He then was included in the starting lineup for the rest of the tournament. Brazil defeated Germany in the final, with Kléberson setting up one of the two Brazilian goals, as well as hitting the bar with a shot, as Brazil won the World Cup for a record fifth time.

After the World Cup, Kléberson retained his starting position in Brazil's team under the new coach Carlos Alberto Parreira and was also included in Brazil's squad for 2003 FIFA Confederations Cup, where Brazil were eliminated in the group stage. That summer, Kléberson moved to Europe to join Manchester United. He failed to achieve regular playing time with his club, and as a result he lost his position in the national team. He managed to be included in Brazil's squad for the 2004 Copa América. He made five appearances in the tournament, starting in every match he played as Brazil went on to win the tournament.

After more than four years in the international wilderness, Kléberson was recalled to the national team by Dunga on 28 May 2009. He was recalled to replace Anderson in two matches for 2010 World Cup qualification and the 2009 FIFA Confederations Cup in South Africa. After recovering from his shoulder surgery, once again Kléberson was called up for the national team on 9 February 2010 for a friendly match against the Republic of Ireland on 2 March in London.

Kléberson was then called up to Brazil's 2010 World Cup squad by Dunga on 11 May. The 23-man squad was almost exactly the same as the squad against Ireland but included one additional player, Heurelho Gomes. His only appearance in the 2010 World Cup was in the round of 16 game against Chile.

== Style of play ==
Kléberson was a midfielder who was known for his passing ability with either foot, which allowed him to create chances for his teammates. His playing style was based on speed, getting forward on the counterattack, and distributing the ball to other players. He was also a powerful shooter from outside the box.

== Coaching career ==
In 2017, Kléberson rejoined the Philadelphia Union as a coach in the youth academy. In 2022, he was promoted to assistant coach of Philadelphia Union II for their inaugural season in MLS Next Pro.

On 20 July 2022, Kléberson joined New York City FC as their assistant coach. He departed the club at the end of the 2023 season, and became a technical director at América Mineiro on 15 June 2024.

On 18 December 2024, América announced Kléberson's departure. On 24 August of the following year, he was appointed head coach of Campeonato Mineiro newcomers North for the upcoming season, in what would be his first experience in the role. His debut on 11 January was a goalless draw away to fellow promoted club URT. His side finished their group as runners-up to Cruzeiro and qualified for the Troféu Inconfidência, where they defeated URT 3–1 on aggregate in the final.

== Personal life ==
After Kleberson's starring role at the 2002 World Cup, Europe's top sides competed to sign him, but he chose to stay in Brazil for another year so he could marry his 15-year-old fiancée (Kleberson aged 23 at the time) when she reached the age of consent, having met her when she was 14.

== Career statistics ==
=== Club ===
Appearances and goals by club, season and competition
Club	Season	League			National cup		League cup		Continental		Other		Total	
Club	Season	Division	Apps	Goals	Apps	Goals	Apps	Goals	Apps	Goals	Apps	Goals	Apps	Goals
Atlético Paranaense	1999	Série A	14	1	3	2	0	0	0	0	—		17	3
Atlético Paranaense	2000	Série A	24	4	2	0	0	0	0	0	—		26	4
Atlético Paranaense	2001	Série A	29	3	7	1	0	0	0	0	—		36	4
Atlético Paranaense	2002	Série A	21	4	0	0	0	0	6	1	—		27	5
Atlético Paranaense	2003	Série A	12	0	2	1	0	0	0	0	—		14	1
Atlético Paranaense	Total		100	12	14	4	0	0	6	1	—		120	17
Manchester United	2003–04	Premier League	12	2	1	0	1	0	2	0	0	0	16	2
Manchester United	2004–05	Premier League	8	0	0	0	3	0	3	0	0	0	14	0
Manchester United	Total		20	2	1	0	4	0	5	0	0	0	30	2
Beşiktaş	2005–06	Süper Lig	31	3	9	0	0	0	6	0	—		46	3
Beşiktaş	2006–07	Süper Lig	14	0	2	0	0	0	5	1	—		21	1
Beşiktaş	Total		45	3	11	0	0	0	11	1	—		67	4
Flamengo	2008	Série A	24	5	0	0	13	1	8	0	—		45	6
Flamengo	2009	Série A	15	1	5	2	16	3	0	0	—		36	6
Flamengo	2010	Série A	21	3	0	0	13	3	8	0	—		42	6
Flamengo	Total		60	9	5	2	42	7	16	0	—		123	18
Atlético Paranaense	2011	Série A	18	2	4	0	0	0	0	0	—		22	2
Flamengo	2012	Série A	3	0	0	0	0	0	6	4	—		9	4
Bahia	2012	Série A	19	2	0	0	0	0	0	0	—		19	2
Bahia	2013	Série A	0	0	0	0	4	5	0	0	—		4	5
Bahia	Total		19	2	0	0	4	5	0	0	—		23	7
Philadelphia Union	2013	Major League Soccer	11	1	0	0	0	0	0	0	—		11	1
Indy Eleven	2014	North American Soccer League	20	8	0	0	0	0	0	0	—		20	8
Indy Eleven	2015	North American Soccer League	1	0	0	0	0	0	0	0	—		1	0
Indy Eleven	Total		21	8	0	0	0	0	0	0	—		21	8
Fort Lauderdale Strikers	2016	North American Soccer League	5	0	0	0	0	0	0	0	—		5	0
Career total			302	39	35	6	50	12	44	6	0	0	431	63

=== International ===
Appearances and goals by national team and year
National team	Year	Apps	Goals
Brazil	2002	13	2
Brazil	2003	7	0
Brazil	2004	6	0
Brazil	2005	1	0
Brazil	2006	0	0
Brazil	2007	0	0
Brazil	2008	0	0
Brazil	2009	4	0
Brazil	2010	1	0
Total		32	2

Scores and results list Brazil's goal tally first, score column indicates score after each Kléberson goal.

List of international goals scored by José Kléberson
No.	Date	Venue	Opponent	Score	Result	Competition
1	31 January 2002	Estádio Serra Dourada, Goiânia, Brazil	Bolivia	4–0	6–0	Friendly
2	7 March 2002	Estádio Governador José Fragelli, Cuiabá, Brazil	Iceland	2–0	6–1	Friendly

== Honours ==
=== Player ===
Atlético Paranaense

- Brazilian Série A: 2001
- Paraná State League: 2000, 2001

Manchester United

- FA Cup: 2003–04

Beşiktaş

- Turkish Cup: 2005–06, 2006–07
- Turkish Super Cup: 2006

Flamengo

- Brazilian Série A: 2009

Brazil

- FIFA World Cup: 2002
- Copa América: 2004
- FIFA Confederations Cup: 2009

Individual

- Bola de Prata: 2001

=== Manager ===
North

- Troféu Inconfidência: 2026
