= Marília Atlético Clube =

Marília
- Full name: Marília Atlético Clube
- Nicknames: MAC ("Marília Atlético Club" abbreviated); Tigre (Tiger); Alviceleste (Sky blue and white)
- Founded: 12 April 1942; 84 years ago
- Ground: Estádio Bento de Abreu
- Capacity: 15,010
- Chairman: Antonio Carlos Souza Vieira "Sojinha"
- Head coach: Guilherme Alves
- League: Campeonato Paulista Série A3
- 2025: Paulista Série A3, 3rd of 16
Home colours	Away colours

Marília Atlético Clube, commonly referred to as Marília, is a Brazilian professional association football club based in Marília, São Paulo. The team competes in the Campeonato Paulista Série A3, the third tier of the São Paulo state football league.

Founded on 12 April 1942, their home stadium is the Bento de Abreu, with a capacity of 19,800.

The club's home colours are sky blue and white and the team mascot is a tiger.

== History ==
Marília was founded on 12 April 1942, as Esporte Clube Comercial. The club name was very unpopular, and on 11 July 1947, a General Assembly changed the name of the club to Marília Atlético Clube.

On 19 April 1954, Marília took a leave of its official football activities. On 7 July 1969, Marília returned to its football activities.

== Honours ==
=== Official tournaments ===
State
Competitions	Titles	Seasons
Campeonato Paulista Série A2	2	1971, 2002

=== Others tournaments ===
==== State ====
- Torneio José Ermirio de Moraes Filho (1): 1974

=== Runners-up ===
- Campeonato Brasileiro Série C (1): 2002
- Copa Paulista (2): 2020, 2022
- Campeonato Paulista Série A3 (1): 2026
- Campeonato Paulista Série A4 (2): 1999, 2019

=== Youth team ===
- Copa São Paulo de Futebol Júnior (1): 1979

=== Women's football ===
- Taça Paulistana de Futebol Feminino (1): 2024
- Campeonato Paulista de Futebol Feminino - Divisão Especial (1): 2023

== Stadium ==
Marília's stadium is Estádio Bento de Abreu, inaugurated in 1967, with a maximum capacity of 18,000 people.

== Symbols and colors ==
Marília's mascot is a tiger, and was chosen in 1969, in a popular contest. The original colors of Marília were red and white.

== Ultras ==
- CCC (Comando Caipira da Capital)
- FARC (Força Alvi Real Celeste)
- Mancha Azul

== Current squad ==
As of February 2015

Note: Flags indicate national team as defined under FIFA eligibility rules; some limited exceptions apply. Players may hold more than one non-FIFA nationality.

No.	Pos.	Nation	Player
—	GK	BRA	Rodrigo Calchi
—	GK	BRA	Marcos Galleti
—	DF	BRA	Alex Bruno
—	DF	BRA	Deca
—	DF	BRA	Evandro
—	DF	BRA	Marcus Vinícius
—	DF	BRA	Rafael Mineiro
—	DF	BRA	Robert Gago
—	DF	BRA	Roni
—	DF	BRA	Thiago Gomes
—	MF	BRA	Bruno Farias
—	MF	BRA	Caíque

No.	Pos.	Nation	Player
—	MF	BRA	Daniel Costa
—	MF	BRA	Fabiano Gadelha
—	MF	BRA	Gil Bahia
—	MF	BRA	Gilberto
—	MF	BRA	Juninho Ortega
—	MF	BRA	Leomir
—	MF	BRA	Lucas Surcin
—	MF	BRA	Thiago Elias
—	MF	BRA	Vítor Cruz
—	FW	BRA	Leandro Costa
—	FW	BRA	Netinho
—	FW	BRA	Wellington Amorim
—	FW	BRA	Natan

=== First-team staff ===
Coach	Luís dos Reis	Brazil
