= Rodrigo Carioca =

Brazilian footballer

Personal information
- Full name: Rodrigo Porto Bezerra
- Date of birth: 21 June 1999 (age 27)
- Place of birth: Rio de Janeiro, Brazil
- Height: 1.79 m (5 ft 10 in)
- Position: Forward

Team information
- Current team: Rio Branco-ES

Youth career
- Paraná

Senior career*
Years	Team	Apps	(Gls)
2018–2019	Paraná	7	(0)
2019–2024	Tombense	21	(1)
2019	→ Paraná (loan)	12	(0)
2020	→ Vitória (loan)	8	(1)
2022	→ Ypiranga-RS (loan)	19	(0)
2023	→ Pouso Alegre (loan)	10	(1)
2023	→ Santo André (loan)	9	(1)
2024	→ Rio Branco-ES (loan)	9	(2)
2025	Juventus-SP	14	(3)
2025	Água Santa	12	(0)
2025	XV de Piracicaba	0	(0)
2026	São José-SP	15	(1)
2026–	Rio Branco-ES	1	(1)
- * Club domestic league appearances and goals as of 20:53, 29 April 2026 (UTC)

Rodrigo Porto Bezerra (born 21 June 1999), known as Rodrigo Carioca, is a Brazilian footballer who plays as a forward for Rio Branco-ES.

== Career ==
Born in Rio de Janeiro, Rodrigo Carioca was a youth product of Paraná Clube, and was promoted to the first team in January 2018. He made his first team – and Série A – debut on 10 November of that year, coming on as a second-half substitute for Rafael Grampola and providing the assist to Andrey's winner in a 1–0 away success over América Mineiro, as the club was already relegated.

Rodrigo Carioca struggled to establish himself as a starter at Paraná due to injuries, and was sold to Tombense in April 2019, being immediately loaned back to his former club. On 27 December of that year, he was announced at Vitória.

Rodrigo Carioca played for his parent club Tombense in the 2021 season, before signing for Ypiranga-RS on 28 December of that year. He subsequently served another loan stints at Pouso Alegre, Santo André and Rio Branco-ES, before joining Juventus-SP ahead of the 2025 campaign.

On 8 April 2025, Água Santa announced the signing of Rodrigo Carioca. After the club's elimination from the Série D, he agreed to a deal with XV de Piracicaba on 20 August.

On 4 November 2025, Rodrigo Carioca became São José-SP's first signing for the 2026 season.

== Career statistics ==
As of 16 November 2025

Club	Season	League			State League		Cup		Continental		Other		Total	
Club	Season	Division	Apps	Goals	Apps	Goals	Apps	Goals	Apps	Goals	Apps	Goals	Apps	Goals
Paraná	2018	Série A	2	0	—		—		—		—		2	0
Paraná	2019	Série B	12	0	5	0	—		—		—		17	0
Paraná	Total		14	0	5	0	—		—		—		19	0
Vitória	2020	Série B	6	1	2	0	1	0	—		2 (Note: Appearance(s) in Copa do Nordeste)	0	11	1
Tombense	2021	Série C	13	0	8	1	2	0	—		1 (Note: Appearance(s) in Recopa Mineira)	0	24	1
Ypiranga-RS	2022	Série C	9	0	10	0	—		—		—		19	0
Pouso Alegre	2023	Série C	—		10	1	—		—		—		10	1
Santo André	2023	Série D	9	1	—		—		—		—		9	1
Rio Branco-ES	2024	Capixaba	—		9	2	—		—		3 (Note: One appearance in Copa Verde, two appearances in Copa Espírito Santo)	0	12	2
Juventus-SP	2025	Paulista A2	—		14	3	—		—		—		14	3
Água Santa	2025	Série D	12	0	—		—		—		—		12	0
XV de Piracicaba	2025	Paulista A2	—		—		—		—		3 (Note: Appearance(s) in Copa Paulista)	0	3	0
São José-SP	2026	Paulista A2	—		15	1	—		—		—		15	1
Rio Branco-ES	2026	Série D	1	1	—		—		—		1 (Note: Appearance(s) in Copa Espírito Santo)	0	2	1
Career total			64	3	73	8	3	0	0	0	10	0	150	11

== Honours ==
Tombense

- Recopa Mineira: 2020

Rio Branco-ES

- Campeonato Capixaba: 2024

XV de Piracicaba

- Copa Paulista: 2025
