= Uraí =

Coordinates: 23°12′S 50°49′W

- Municipality
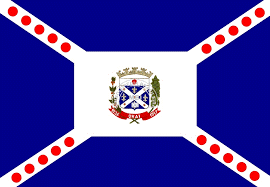
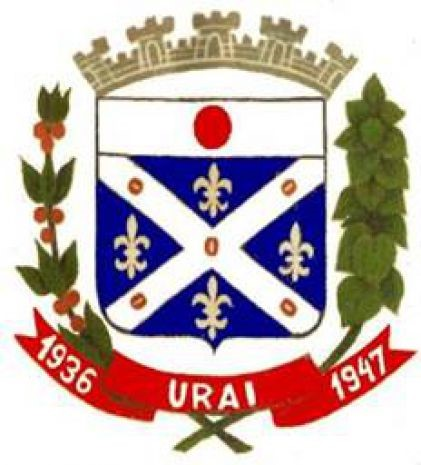
- Flag Coat of arms
- Interactive map of Uraí
- Country: Brazil
- Region: Southern
- State: Paraná
- Mesoregion: Norte Pioneiro Paranaense
- Founded: May 5, 1936; 90 years ago

Government
  - Mayor: Ângelo Tarantini Filho
  - Vice Mayor: William Xavier

Population (2020)
  - Total: 11,273
- Time zone: UTC−3 (BRT)
- Website: www.urai.pr.gov.br

Uraí is a municipality in the state of Paraná in the Southern Region of Brazil.

Brazilian World Cup winning footballer Kleberson was born in Uraí.

== See also ==
- List of municipalities in Paraná
