= Recopa Mineira =

Brazilian football super cup tournament

- Organiser(s): FMF
- Founded: 2021
- Region: Minas Gerais, Brazil
- Teams: 2
- Related competitions: Campeonato Mineiro; Troféu Inconfidência
- Current champions: Athletic (1st title)
- Most championships: Tombense (2 titles)

The Recopa Mineira (English: Minas Gerais Winners Cup), is a super cup tournament organized by the Federação Mineira de Futebol reuniting the winners of Troféu Inconfidência and the best placed team that is not from Belo Horizonte of each season of Campeonato Mineiro.

== List of champions ==
Following is the list with all the champions of the Recopa Mineira.

Year	Venue (date)	Champion	Final score	Runners-up
2020	Independência (20 Feb 2021)	Tombense; 2020 Campeonato Mineiro best countryside team	2–0	Uberlândia; 2020 Troféu Inconfidência winners
2021	Almeidão (26 Jan 2022)	Tombense; 2021 Campeonato Mineiro best countryside team	1–1; 6–5 (pen.)	Pouso Alegre; 2021 Troféu Inconfidência winners
2022	Estádio Joaquim Portugal (14 Jan 2023)	Athletic; 2022 Campeonato Mineiro best countryside team	1–0	Democrata (GV); 2022 Troféu Inconfidência winners

=== Titles by team ===
Rank	Club	Winners	Winning years
1	Tombense	2	2020, 2021
2	Athletic	1	2022
