= Marcelinho (footballer, born September 1998) =

Brazilian footballer (born 1998)

Personal information
- Full name: Marcelo da Silva Ibiapina
- Date of birth: 29 September 1998 (age 28)
- Place of birth: Campo Maior, Piauí, Brazil
- Height: 1.78 m (5 ft 10 in)
- Position: Midfielder

Team information
- Current team: Piauí EC
- Number: 19

Youth career
- 2021: Comercial-PI

Senior career*
| Years | Team | Apps | (Gls) |
| 2021–2022 | Comercial-PI | 17 | (1) |
| 2022–2023 | Campinense | 0 | (0) |
| 2023 | Icasa | 0 | (0) |
| 2023–2024 | Altos | 16 | (1) |
| 2023 | Oeirense | 7 | (1) |
| 2024 | Sampaio Corrêa | 7 | (0) |
| 2024–2025 | Juventus-SP | 12 | (0) |
| 2026– | Piauí | 2 | (0) |
- * Club domestic league appearances and goals as of 13 June 2026

Marcelo da Silva Ibiapina (born 29 September 1998), known as Marcelo Ibiapina or Marcelinho, is a Brazilian professional footballer who plays as a midfielder for Piauí EC.

== Career ==
Born in Campo Maior, in the state of Piauí, Marcelinho began his senior career with Comercial-PI, appearing for the club across the 2021 and 2022 seasons.

At the end of 2022, Marcelinho moved to Campinense, of Paraíba state. During 2023 he went on to feature for Icasa and Oeirense, before joining Altos in August of that year. He remained with Altos into the 2024 season, making 27 appearances and scoring twice for the club across the two campaigns, in addition to providing two assists.

In April 2024, Marcelinho was transferred to Sampaio Corrêa, a Maranhão-based club, going on to make eight appearances during the 2024 season. He signed for Juventus-SP in November 2024, and made 12 appearances for the São Paulo club during the 2025 season.

Marcelinho returned to Piauí EC in April 2026. According to statistics aggregator Tribuna.com, he has been credited with one Campeonato Piauiense title and one Campeonato Maranhense title during his career.

== Career statistics ==
As of 13 June 2026

Appearances and goals by club and season
| Club | Season | League | | | Cup | | Continental | | State League | | Other | | Total | |
| Club | Season | Division | Apps | Goals | Apps | Goals | Apps | Goals | Apps | Goals | Apps | Goals | Apps | Goals |
|---|---|---|---|---|---|---|---|---|---|---|---|---|---|---|
| Comercial-PI | 2021 | Piauiense B | 0 | 0 | 0 | 0 | 0 | 0 | 10 | 1 | 0 | 0 | 10 | 1 |
| Comercial-PI | 2022 | Piauiense B | 0 | 0 | 0 | 0 | 0 | 0 | 7 | 0 | 0 | 0 | 7 | 0 |
| Comercial-PI | Total | | 0 | 0 | 0 | 0 | 0 | 0 | 17 | 1 | 0 | 0 | 17 | 1 |
| Icasa | 2023 | Cearense B | 0 | 0 | 0 | 0 | 0 | 0 | 0 | 0 | 2 (Note: Appearances in Copa Fares Lopes) | 1 | 2 | 1 |
| Oeirense | 2023 | Piauiense B | 0 | 0 | 0 | 0 | 0 | 0 | 7 | 1 | 0 | 0 | 7 | 1 |
| Altos | 2023 | Série C | 4 | 0 | 0 | 0 | 0 | 0 | 0 | 0 | 0 | 0 | 4 | 0 |
| Altos | 2024 | Série C | 0 | 0 | 0 | 0 | 0 | 0 | 12 | 1 | 11 (Note: Appearances in Copa do Nordeste) | 1 | 23 | 2 |
| Altos | Total | | 4 | 0 | 0 | 0 | 0 | 0 | 12 | 1 | 11 | 1 | 27 | 2 |
| Sampaio Corrêa | 2024 | Série C | 7 | 0 | 1 | 0 | 0 | 0 | 0 | 0 | 0 | 0 | 8 | 0 |
| Juventus-SP | 2025 | Paulista A2 | 0 | 0 | 0 | 0 | 0 | 0 | 12 | 0 | 0 | 0 | 12 | 0 |
| Piauí EC | 2026 | Série D | 2 | 0 | 0 | 0 | 0 | 0 | 0 | 0 | 1 | 0 | 3 | 0 |
| Career total | | | 13 | 0 | 1 | 0 | 0 | 0 | 48 | 3 | 14 | 1 | 76 | 5 |

== Honours ==
Altos

- Campeonato Piauiense: 2024

Comercial-PI

- Piauiense B: 2022

Oeirense

- Piauiense B: 2023
