= Fellipe Ferreira =

Brazilian footballer (born 1997)

Personal information
- Full name: Fellipe Ferreira Nascimento
- Date of birth: 25 August 1997 (age 29)
- Place of birth: São Paulo, Brazil
- Height: 1.85 m (6 ft 1 in)
- Position: Defender

Team information
- Current team: Aparecidense

Youth career
- 2013-2016: Ituano

Senior career*
Years	Team	Apps	(Gls)
2016–2021	Ituano	10	(1)
2018	→ Guarani-SC (loan)	14	(1)
2020	→ Cabofriense (loan)	14	(3)
2021	→ Luverdense (loan)	4	(0)
2021–2022	São Bento-SP	12	(1)
2022	Portuguesa-RJ	1	(0)
2023	São José-SP	2	(0)
2023	Cabofriense	9	(0)
2024	Atlético-BA	9	(2)
2024	Real Noroeste	14	(0)
2025	Juventus-SP	7	(1)
2025	Ipatinga	10	(1)
2026-	Aparecidense	6	(1)
- * Club domestic league appearances and goals as of 17 August 2026

Fellipe Ferreira Nascimento (born 25 August 1997), known as Fellipe Ferreira, is a Brazilian professional footballer who plays as a defender, primarily as a centre-back, for Aparecidense.

== Club career ==
Born in São Paulo, Fellipe Ferreira came through the youth academy of Ituano, going on to represent the club's first team between 2016 and 2021, including a loan spell at Guarani-SC in 2018.

He was loaned to Cabofriense in 2020 and to Luverdense in 2021, before joining São Bento later that year. He subsequently had spells with Portuguesa-RJ in 2022, São José-SP and, for a second time, Cabofriense in 2023.

In 2024, Fellipe Ferreira signed for Atlético-BA before moving to Real Noroeste later that year. He joined Juventus-SP in January 2025, before transferring to Ipatinga in April 2025, where he was a regular member of the centre-back pairing during the club's Campeonato Mineiro Módulo II campaign. He moved to Aparecidense in January 2026.

== Career statistics ==
As of match played 12 August 2026

Appearances and goals by club, season and competition
Club	Season	League			Cup		State League		Other		Total	
Club	Season	Division	Apps	Goals	Apps	Goals	Apps	Goals	Apps	Goals	Apps	Goals
Ituano	2016	Série D	1	0	0	0	0	0	2 (Note: Appearances in Copa Paulista)	0	3	0
Ituano	2017	Série D	—		—		—		—		0	0
Ituano	2018	Campeonato Paulista	1	0	0	0	0	0	16	0	17	0
Ituano	2019	Série D	8	1	0	0	0	0	0	0	8	1
Ituano	Total		10	1	0	0	0	0	18	0	28	1
Guarani-SC (loan)	2018	Catarinense B	0	0	0	0	14	1	0	0	14	1
Cabofriense (loan)	2020	Série D	14	3	0	0	0	0	0	0	14	3
Luverdense (loan)	2021	Mato-Grossense	0	0	0	0	4	0	0	0	4	0
São Bento-SP	2021	Série D	11	1	1	0	0	0	2	0	14	1
Portuguesa-RJ	2022	Série D	1	0	0	0	0	0	0	0	1	0
São José-SP	2023	Paulista A3	0	0	0	0	2	0	0	0	2	0
Cabofriense	2023	Carioca A2	0	0	0	0	9	0	0	0	9	0
Atlético-BA	2024	Campeonato Baiano	0	0	0	0	9	2	0	0	9	2
Real Noroeste	2024	Série D	14	0	0	0	0	0	9 (Note: Appearances in Copa Espírito Santo)	0	23	0
Juventus-SP	2025	Paulista A2	0	0	0	0	7	1	0	0	7	1
Ipatinga	2025	Mineiro II	0	0	0	0	10	1	0	0	10	1
Aparecidense	2026	Série D	4	1	0	0	2	0	0	0	6	1
Career total			54	6	1	0	57	5	28	0	140	11
