= Natan (footballer, born 2000) =

Brazilian footballer (born 2000)

Personal information
- Full name: Natan André Costa Ramos
- Date of birth: 12 June 2000 (age 26)
- Place of birth: Rio de Janeiro, Brazil
- Height: 1.83 m (6 ft 0 in)
- Position: Forward

Team information
- Current team: Marília

Youth career
- 2018: Sport
- 2019: Cabofriense

Senior career*
Years	Team	Apps	(Gls)
2019–2021	Cabofriense	27	(3)
2021	→ Madureira (loan)	8	(0)
2021–2022	Volta Redonda	34	(2)
2023	Gonçalense	10	(1)
2023	Joinville	2	(0)
2024	Barcelona de Ilhéus	11	(1)
2024–2025	Petrópolis FC	10	(1)
2025	→ Ferroviário (loan)	9	(0)
2025	→ Retrô (loan)	4	(0)
2025	→ Juventus-SP (loan)	14	(3)
2025	→ XV de Piracicaba (loan)	0	(0)
2026	Piauí	22	(2)
2026-	Marília	0	(0)
- * Club domestic league appearances and goals as of 12 August 2026

Natan André Costa Ramos (born 12 June 2000), simply known as Natan, is a Brazilian professional footballer who plays as a forward for Marília.

== Club career ==
Born in Rio de Janeiro, Natan began his career in the youth categories of Sport Club do Recife before joining Cabofriense, where he made his senior debut in 2019. He spent three seasons with the Rio de Janeiro state club, being loaned to Madureira during the 2021 Campeonato Carioca.

In 2021, Natan joined Volta Redonda, with whom he won the Campeonato Carioca second division and the Copa Rio in 2022.

He subsequently had spells with Gonçalense and Joinville in 2023, before moving to Barcelona de Ilhéus and Petrópolis FC in 2024.

While registered with Petrópolis, Natan spent the 2025 season out on a series of loans, representing Ferroviário, Retrô, Juventus-SP where he recorded his best individual campaign of the year, with 14 appearances, three goals and one assist in the Campeonato Paulista Série A2 and XV de Piracicaba, with whom he won the 2025 Copa Paulista.

In November 2025, Natan was announced as a signing of Piauí for the 2026 season. With the club, he won the 2026 Campeonato Piauiense, as Piauí retained the state title by beating Atlético Piauiense in the final. He later moved to Marília later in the 2026 season.

== Honours ==
Volta Redonda

- Campeonato Carioca Série A2: 2022
- Copa Rio: 2022

XV de Piracicaba

- Copa Paulista: 2025

Piauí

- Campeonato Piauiense: 2026

== Career statistics ==
As of match played 12 August 2026

Appearances and goals by club, season and competition
Club	Season	League			Cup		State League		Other		Total	
Club	Season	Division	Apps	Goals	Apps	Goals	Apps	Goals	Apps	Goals	Apps	Goals
Cabofriense	2019	Campeonato Carioca	0	0	0	0	0	0	1 (Note: Appearance(s) in Copa Rio)	0	1	0
Cabofriense	2020	Série D	14	0	0	0	3	0	0	0	17	0
Cabofriense	2021	Campeonato Carioca	0	0	0	0	10	3	0	0	10	3
Cabofriense	Total		14	0	0	0	13	3	1	0	28	3
Madureira (loan)	2021	Campeonato Carioca	0	0	0	0	8	0	0	0	8	0
Volta Redonda	2021	Série C	14	1	0	0	0	0	2	0	16	1
Volta Redonda	2022	Série C	13	0	0	0	7	1	5	0	25	1
Volta Redonda	Total		27	1	0	0	7	1	7	0	41	2
Joinville	2023	Campeonato Catarinense	0	0	0	0	2	0	0	0	2	0
Gonçalense	2023	Carioca Série A2	0	0	0	0	10	1	6	0	16	1
Barcelona de Ilhéus	2024	Campeonato Baiano	0	0	0	0	11	1	0	0	11	1
Petrópolis FC	2024	Carioca Série A2	0	0	0	0	10	1	3	1	13	2
Juventus-SP (loan)	2025	Paulista A2	0	0	0	0	14	3	0	0	14	3
Retrô (loan)	2025	Série C	4	0	0	0	0	0	0	0	4	0
Ferroviário (loan)	2025	Série D	9	0	0	0	0	0	0	0	9	0
XV de Piracicaba (loan)	2025	Paulista A2	0	0	0	0	0	0	5 (Note: Appearance(s) in Copa Paulista)	0	5	0
Piauí	2026	Série D	11	0	6	0	11	2	0	0	28	2
Marília	2026	Paulista A3	0	0	0	0	0	0	2	1	2	1
Career total			65	1	6	0	86	12	24	2	181	15
