= Matheus Guedes =

Brazilian footballer (born 1999)

Personal information
- Full name: Matheus Gabriel Guedes Caetano
- Date of birth: 3 December 1999 (age 26)
- Place of birth: Rondonópolis, Brazil
- Height: 1.95 m (6 ft 5 in)
- Position: Centre-back

Team information
- Current team: Juventus-SP

Youth career
- 2012–2018: Santos

Senior career*
| Years | Team | Apps | (Gls) |
| 2018–2019 | Santos | 0 | (0) |
| 2019–2022 | Portimonense | 0 | (0) |
| 2023 | Grêmio Anápolis | 9 | (1) |
| 2023 | → Atlético Goianiense (loan) | 2 | (0) |
| 2024 | Cianorte | 10 | (0) |
| 2025– | Juventus-SP | 12 | (1) |
- * Club domestic league appearances and goals as of 18:49, 24 February 2025 (UTC)

Matheus Gabriel Guedes Caetano (born 3 December 1999), known as Matheus Guedes, is a Brazilian footballer who plays as a central defender for Juventus-SP.

== Career ==
=== Santos ===
Born in Rondonópolis, Mato Grosso, Guedes joined Santos' youth setup in 2012 at the age of 13. On 22 March 2016, after being linked to English and Italian clubs, he signed his first professional contract after agreeing to a three-year deal.

On 21 November 2017, Guedes was called up to the first team by manager Elano, mainly due to squad shortage. In January 2018, he was promoted to the main squad by new manager Jair Ventura.

Guedes made his senior debut on 12 September 2018, coming on as a second-half substitute in a 2–1 Copa Paulista away loss against Taubaté. The following 15 March, he refused a contract renewal from the club, after having offers from Europe.

=== Portimonense ===
On 10 June 2019, it was reported that Guedes agreed to a contract with Roma, after his deal with Santos expired. However, the deal never materialized, and he signed a four-year contract with Portuguese Primeira Liga side Portimonense on 24 September.

However, Guedes only featured for Portimonense's under-23 squad during his spell.

=== Grêmio Anápolis ===
On 2 January 2023, Guedes signed for Grêmio Anápolis. A regular starter, he scored his first senior goal on 15 February, netting the opener in a 1–1 away draw against cross-town rivals Anápolis, but could not prevent the club's relegation in the 2023 Campeonato Goiano.

=== Atlético Goianiense ===
On 4 April 2023, Guedes moved to Série B side Atlético Goianiense. He made his debut for the club on 21 April, replacing Shaylon in a 2–1 home win over CRB.

== Career statistics ==
As of 24 February 2025

Appearances and goals by club, season and competition
| Club | Season | League | | | State League | | Cup | | Continental | | Other | | Total | |
| Club | Season | Division | Apps | Goals | Apps | Goals | Apps | Goals | Apps | Goals | Apps | Goals | Apps | Goals |
|---|---|---|---|---|---|---|---|---|---|---|---|---|---|---|
| Santos | 2018 | Série A | 0 | 0 | 0 | 0 | 0 | 0 | — | | 2 (Note: Appearance(s) in Copa Paulista) | 0 | 2 | 0 |
| Portimonense | 2019–20 | Primeira Liga | 0 | 0 | — | | 0 | 0 | — | | 0 | 0 | 0 | 0 |
| Grêmio Anápolis | 2023 | Goiano | — | | 9 | 1 | — | | — | | — | | 9 | 1 |
| Atlético Goianiense | 2023 | Série B | 2 | 0 | — | | — | | — | | — | | 2 | 0 |
| Cianorte | 2024 | Série D | 0 | 0 | 10 | 0 | 1 | 0 | — | | — | | 11 | 0 |
| Juventus-SP | 2025 | Paulista A2 | — | | 12 | 1 | — | | — | | — | | 12 | 1 |
| Career total | | | 2 | 0 | 31 | 2 | 1 | 0 | 0 | 0 | 2 | 0 | 36 | 2 |
