= Adson (footballer, born 2001) =

Brazilian footballer (born 2001)

Personal information
- Full name: Adsonnaldo Ferreira Nascimento
- Date of birth: 29 April 2001 (age 25)
- Place of birth: Petrolina, Brazil
- Height: 1.82 m (5 ft 11 1/2 in)
- Position: Winger

Team information
- Current team: Fluminense-PI

Youth career
- 2018: Atlético Paranaense
- 2019–2020: Sport
- 2021: Red Bull Bragantino

Senior career*
Years	Team	Apps	(Gls)
2022	Grêmio Anápolis	1	(0)
2022	URT	7	(0)
2022	Petrolina	1	(0)
2023	VOCEM	11	(0)
2024	Taquaritinga	14	(4)
2024	Osasco Sporting	0	(0)
2025	Juventus-SP	10	(1)
2025	Tombense	7	(0)
2026	Inter SM	4	(0)
2026	Rio Branco-SP	12	(0)
2026-	Fluminense-PI	12	(1)
- * Club domestic league appearances and goals as of 14 August 2026

Adsonnaldo Ferreira Nascimento (born 29 April 2001), better known as Adson, is a Brazilian professional footballer who plays as a winger for Fluminense-PI.

== Club career ==
Born in Petrolina, Pernambuco, Adson passed through the youth academies of Atlético Paranaense, Sport and Red Bull Bragantino before beginning his senior career in 2022, with brief spells at Grêmio Anápolis, URT and, later that year, at Petrolina, in his home state.

In 2023, Adson joined VOCEM, also spending time on the books of Matonense without making a first-team appearance for the latter. The following year, he moved to Taquaritinga, scoring against his former club VOCEM on the opening day of the 2024 Campeonato Paulista Série A4. He later joined Oeste for the Copa Paulista stage of the season.

Adson signed for Juventus-SP in 2025, before moving on to Tombense to compete in the Campeonato Brasileiro Série C. In 2026, he had a short spell with Inter SM in Rio Grande do Sul, followed by Rio Branco-SP, before joining Fluminense-PI in March 2026 to play in the Campeonato Brasileiro Série D and the Copa do Nordeste.

== Career statistics ==
As of match played 20 June 2026

Appearances and goals by club, season and competition
Club	Season	League			Cup		State League		Other		Total	
Club	Season	Division	Apps	Goals	Apps	Goals	Apps	Goals	Apps	Goals	Apps	Goals
Grêmio Anápolis	2022	Série D	0	0	0	0	1	0	0	0	1	0
URT	2022	Série D	7	0	0	0	0	0	0	0	7	0
Petrolina	2022	Pernambucano Série A2	0	0	0	0	1	0	0	0	1	0
VOCEM	2023	Paulista Segunda Divisão	0	0	0	0	11	0	0	0	11	0
Taquaritinga	2024	Série A4	0	0	0	0	14	4	0	0	14	4
Osasco Sporting	2024	Paulista A2	0	0	0	0	0	0	10 (Note: Appearances in Copa Paulista)	0	10	0
Juventus-SP	2025	Paulista A2	0	0	0	0	10	1	0	0	10	1
Tombense	2025	Série C	7	0	0	0	0	0	0	0	7	0
Inter SM	2026	Campeonato Gaúcho	0	0	0	0	4	0	0	0	4	0
Rio Branco-SP	2026	Paulista A3	0	0	0	0	12	0	0	0	12	0
Fluminense-PI	2026	Série D	10	1	2	0	0	0	0	0	12	1
Career total			17	1	2	0	53	5	10	0	89	6
