= Caio (footballer, born 1997) =

Brazilian footballer

Personal information
- Full name: Caio Alan Tem Catem Gonçalves
- Date of birth: 26 January 1997 (age 29)
- Place of birth: Pato Bragado, Brazil
- Height: 1.94 m (6 ft 4 in)
- Position: Goalkeeper

Team information
- Current team: Nacional

Youth career
- –2015: Villa Nova
- 2015–2018: Atlético Paranaense

Senior career*
Years	Team	Apps	(Gls)
2018–	Athletico Paranaense	14	(0)
2018–2019	→ Louletano (loan)	15	(0)
2020	→ Água Santa (loan)	1	(0)
2021	→ Maringá (loan)	12	(0)
2021	Mirassol	0	(0)
2022	Azuriz	21	(0)
2023	Velo Clube	9	(0)
2023	Sampaio Corrêa		
2024	Botafogo-PB	1	(0)
2025	CA Juventus		
2025	Ipatinga		
2026–	Nacional	7	(0)
- * Club domestic league appearances and goals as of 19 November 2026

Caio Alan Tem Catem Gonçalves (born 26 January 1997), simply known as Caio, is a Brazilian footballer who plays as a goalkeeper for Nacional.

== Career statistics ==
=== Club ===
As of 30 March 2021.

Club	Season	League			State League		Cup		Continental		Other		Total	
Club	Season	Division	Apps	Goals	Apps	Goals	Apps	Goals	Apps	Goals	Apps	Goals	Apps	Goals
Athletico Paranaense	2018	Série A	0	0	10	0	0	0	—		—		10	0
Athletico Paranaense	2019	Série A	3	0	0	0	0	0	0	0	0	0	3	0
Athletico Paranaense	Total		3	0	10	0	0	0	0	0	0	0	13	0
Louletano (loan)	2018–19	Campeonato de Portugal	15	0	—		0	0	—		0	0	15	0
Água Santa (loan)	2020	Paulista	—		0	0	—		—		—		0	0
Maringá (loan)	2021	Paranaense	—		3	0	—		—		—		3	0
Career total			18	0	13	0	0	0	0	0	0	0	31	0

== Honours ==
Athletico Paranaense

- Campeonato Paranaense: 2018
- J.League Cup / Copa Sudamericana Championship: 2019
