= Léo Santos (footballer, born 1998) =

Brazilian footballer (born 1998)

Personal information
- Full name: Leonardo Carneiro Martins dos Santos
- Date of birth: 31 March 1998 (age 28)
- Place of birth: São Paulo, Brazil
- Height: 1.85 m (6 ft 1 in)
- Position: Defender

Team information
- Current team: Veranópolis

Youth career
- 2012–2017: Desportivo Brasil
- 2015: → Shandong Luneng (loan)
- 2016: → Palmeiras (loan)

Senior career*
Years	Team	Apps	(Gls)
2018	Desportivo Brasil	0	(0)
2019	Francana	20	(1)
2020	Inter SM	3	(1)
2020	Independente de Limeira	4	(0)
2021	Inter SM	13	(1)
2021	Aimoré	0	(0)
2022	Luverdense	3	(0)
2022	Avenida	12	(1)
2022	Lajeadense	0	(0)
2023	XV de Piracicaba	0	(0)
2023	Guarany de Bagé	11	(0)
2024	Comercial	8	(0)
2024	Veranópolis	11	(1)
2024	GE Brasil	4	(1)
2025	Juventus-SP	12	(0)
2025	Itabirito FC	4	(0)
2026	URT	10	(1)
2026	Altos	0	(0)
2026-	Veranópolis	0	(0)
- * Club domestic league appearances and goals as of 19 August 2026

Leonardo Carneiro Martins dos Santos (born 31 March 1998), known as Léo Santos, is a Brazilian professional footballer who plays as a defender for Veranópolis.

== Club career ==
Born in São Paulo, Léo Santos came through the youth academy of Desportivo Brasil between 2012 and 2017, including a loan spell in the youth categories of Shandong Luneng, in China. He made his senior debut with Desportivo Brasil in 2018, before moving to Francana in 2019.

He subsequently had loan and transfer spells with Inter SM and Independente de Limeira in 2020, returning to Inter SM in 2021. In 2022, he represented Luverdense, Avenida and Lajeadense over the course of the season.

In 2023, Léo Santos signed for XV de Piracicaba for the Campeonato Paulista Série A2, before moving to Guarany de Bagé later that year. He went on to play for Comercial and Veranópolis in 2024, later joining GE Brasil to compete in the Campeonato Brasileiro Série D.

Léo Santos signed for Juventus-SP in 2025, before moving to Itabirito FC. He joined URT at the start of 2026, before signing for Altos in March 2026 to play in the Série D. He returned to Veranópolis later in 2026.

== Career statistics ==
As of match played 12 August 2026

Appearances and goals by club, season and competition
Club	Season	League			Cup		State League		Other		Total	
Club	Season	Division	Apps	Goals	Apps	Goals	Apps	Goals	Apps	Goals	Apps	Goals
Desportivo Brasil	2018	Série A3	0	0	0	0	0	0	7 (Note: Appearances in Copa Paulista)	0	7	0
Francana	2019	Paulista Segunda Divisão	0	0	0	0	20	1	0	0	20	1
Inter SM	2020	Gaúcho Série A2	0	0	0	0	3	1	0	0	3	1
Independente de Limeira	2020	Paulista Segunda Divisão	0	0	0	0	4	0	0	0	4	0
Inter SM	2021	Gaúcho Série A2	0	0	0	0	13	1	0	0	13	1
Aimoré	2021	Série D	0	0	0	0	0	0	0	0	0	0
Luverdense	2022	Campeonato Mato-Grossense	0	0	0	0	3	0	0	0	3	0
Avenida	2022	Gaúcho Série A2	0	0	0	0	12	1	0	0	12	1
Lajeadense	2022	Gaúcho Série A2	0	0	0	0	0	0	3 (Note: Appearances in Copa FGF)	0	3	0
XV de Piracicaba	2023	Série A2	0	0	0	0	0	0	0	0	0	0
Guarany de Bagé	2023	Gaúcho Série A2	0	0	0	0	11	0	0	0	11	0
Comercial	2024	Série A2	0	0	0	0	8	0	0	0	8	0
Veranópolis	2024	Gaúcho Série A2	0	0	0	0	11	1	0	0	11	1
GE Brasil	2024	Série D	4	1	0	0	0	0	0	0	4	1
Juventus-SP	2025	Série A2	0	0	0	0	12	0	0	0	12	0
Itabirito FC	2025	Série D	4	0	0	0	0	0	0	0	4	0
URT	2026	Campeonato Mineiro	0	0	0	0	10	1	0	0	10	1
Altos	2026	Série D	5	0	0	0	0	0	0	0	5	0
Veranópolis	2026	Gaúcho Série A2	0	0	0	0	0	0	0	0	0	0
Career total			9	1	0	0	107	5	10	0	130	7
