= Ponta Grossa Esporte Clube =

Ponta Grossa
- Full name: Ponta Grossa Esporte Clube
- Founded: June 30, 1994
- Dissolved: 2003 (de facto); April 24, 2020 (officially)
- Ground: Estádio Germano Krüger, Ponta Grossa, Paraná state, Brazil
- Capacity: 8,620
- Owner: Antônio Luiz Mikulis
Home colours	Away colours

Ponta Grossa Esporte Clube, commonly known as Ponta Grossa, was a Brazilian football club based in Ponta Grossa, Paraná state. They competed in the Série C twice.

== History ==
The club was founded on June 30, 1994, by a former president of another Ponta Grossa club, Operário Ferroviário Esporte Clube. They competed in the Série C in 1997, when they were eliminated in the Second Stage, and 2002 in the First Stage of the competition. Due to financial problems, in 2003 the club sold its spot in the Campeonato Paranaense to ADAP, competing in that season's competition as ADAP/Ponta Grossa.

Ponta Grossa EC went inactive in the same year and in April 24, 2020, the club finally went extinct after their owner ended its CNPJ by voluntary liquidation.

== Honours ==
- Campeonato Paranaense Second Division
  - Runners-up (1): 1994

== Stadium ==
Ponta Grossa Esporte Clube played their home games at Estádio Germano Krüger. The stadium has a maximum capacity of 8,620 people.
