= Henry (footballer) =

Brazilian footballer (born 1999)

Personal information
- Full name: Henry Miyamoto Garcia Silva
- Date of birth: 19 March 1999 (age 27)
- Place of birth: São Paulo, Brazil
- Height: 1.78 m (5 ft 10 in)
- Position: Forward

Team information
- Current team: Oeste
- Number: 19

Youth career
- Atlético Mineiro
- Osasco Audax

Senior career*
Years	Team	Apps	(Gls)
2018–2024	Osasco Audax	15	(2)
2018–2019	→ Braga B (loan)	20	(5)
2021	→ Paulista (loan)	10	(3)
2022	Ska Brasil	9	(4)
2024	Maguary	1	(0)
2024–	Oeste	20	(8)
- * Club domestic league appearances and goals as of 14:27, 13 August 2021 (UTC)

Henry Miyamoto Garcia Silva (born 19 March 1999), commonly known as Henry, is a Brazilian footballer who currently plays as a forward for Oeste.

== Career statistics ==
=== Club ===
As of 13 August 2021.

Club	Season	League			State League		Cup		Other		Total	
Club	Season	Division	Apps	Goals	Apps	Goals	Apps	Goals	Apps	Goals	Apps	Goals
Osasco Audax	2018	–			0	0	0	0	0	0	0	0
Osasco Audax	2019	–			0	0	0	0	0	0	0	0
Osasco Audax	2020	–			7 (Note: Appearances in the Campeonato Paulista A2)	1	0	0	8 (Note: Appearances in the Copa Paulista)	1	15	2
Osasco Audax	2021	–			0	0	0	0	0	0	0	0
Osasco Audax	Total		0	0	7	1	0	0	8	1	15	2
Braga B (loan)	2018–19	LigaPro	20	5	–		0	0	0	0	20	5
Career total			20	5	7	1	0	0	8	1	35	7
