= Ferroviário Atlético Clube =

Ferroviário Atlético Clube may refer to the following Brazilian club:

- Ferroviário Atlético Clube (CE), Ceará
- Ferroviário Atlético Clube (RO), Rondônia
- Ferroviário Atlético Clube (AL), Alagoas

== See also ==
- Clube Atlético Ferroviário, Paraná
