= Montes Claros Esporte Clube =

Montes Claros
- Full name: Montes Claros Esporte Clube
- Nickname: Bicho
- Founded: 28 August 1992; 34 years ago
- Ground: Estádio José Maria de Melo
- Capacity: 5,000
- 2018: Campeonato Mineiro Segunda Divisão, 6th

Montes Claros Esporte Clube is a Brazilian football club from Montes Claros in the state of Minas Gerais.

Founded in 1992, the club played in the Campeonato Mineiro, the top division of football in the state, in 1997 and 1998, and also competed in the Campeonato Brasileiro Série C in 1997. It competed intermittently in the 21st century, and after a change of ownership, last competed in the third-tier Campeonato Mineiro Segunda Divisão in 2018. Owner Andrey Souza then established North Esporte Clube in 2022.

== History ==
Founded on 28 August 1992 as Montes Claros Futebol Clube, the club wore a light blue, white and black striped kit similar to Grêmio. It entered the Campeonato Mineiro Segunda Divisão, the third tier of football in Minas Gerais, in 1994. In 1995, it won promotion to the Campeonato Mineiro Módulo II as runners-up, and repeated that position in 1996 to win promotion to the top-flight Campeonato Mineiro; both times it finished only behind Social de Coronel Fabriciano.

In 1997, the club finished 6th in its debut top-flight season, as well as coming 14th in the national third-tier Campeonato Brasileiro Série C. After relegation in 1998, it lay dormant apart from one season in the state's third level (2004), and only competed in youth and amateur football. The team returned to professional football in 2012.

On 7 December 2013, Montes Claros defeated Uberlandense by one goal to win promotion to the second tier as runners-up on goal difference to Nacional de Uberaba. The penalty kick was scored by Leandro Mineiro, who was top scorer for the season with 13 goals.

Logo before the 2018 name change

In February 2014, Montes Claros signed the goalkeeper Bruno while he was serving 22 years in prison for the murder of his girlfriend. Club president Ville Mocelin said "Every human being has the right to a second chance. Montes Claros' thought is to give an opportunity to Bruno to recover for football and society". He never played for the club, as the Court of Justice of the State of Minas Gerais denied him work release.

After two seasons in the second tier ended with relegation in 2015, Montes Claros did not compete in the third level in 2016. In February 2017, when Bruno was released from prison, he was still on a contract for two more years, and the only other player under contract was Léo Baiano. The club was no longer registered with the Federação Mineira de Futebol due to withdrawing even from youth competition due to the end of municipal funding.

In May 2018, the club was reformed as Monte Claros Esporte Clube, a corporation owned by Andrey Souza, owner of the volleyball club MOC Vôlei. After finishing 6th, the club withdrew a year later, due to funding from local government ending. In June 2022, Souza formed a new club, North Esporte Clube.
