= Pato Bragado =

Coordinates: 24°37′S 54°13′W

- Municipality
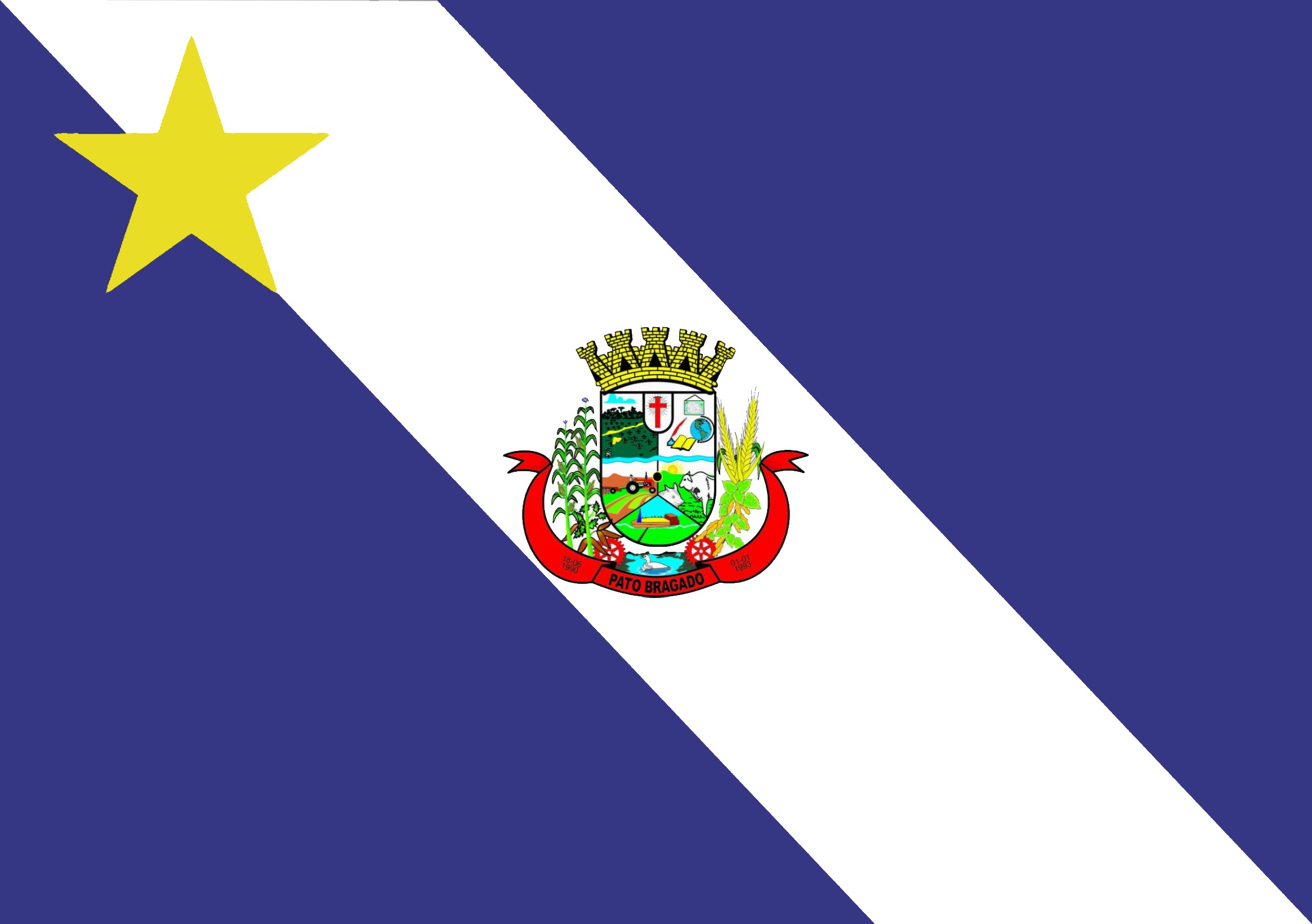
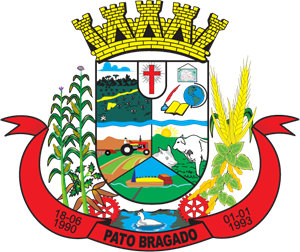
- Flag Coat of arms
- Interactive map of Pato Bragado
- Country: Brazil
- Region: Southern
- State: Paraná
- Mesoregion: Oeste Paranaense

Population (2020)
  - Total: 5,684
- Time zone: UTC−3 (BRT)

Pato Bragado is a municipality in the state of Paraná in the Southern Region of Brazil.

== See also ==
- List of municipalities in Paraná
