= Licínio de Almeida =

Municipality of Bahia, Brazil

Coordinates: 14°41′S 42°30′W

- Municipality
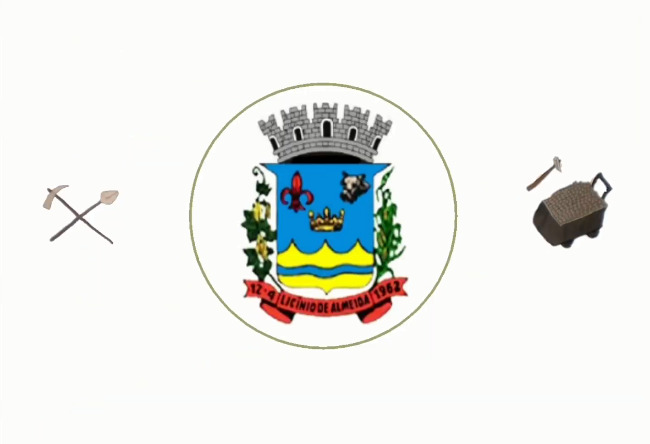
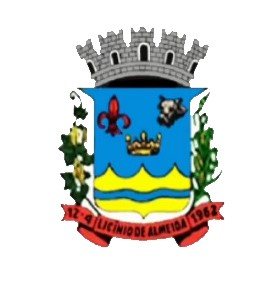
- Flag Coat of arms
- Interactive map of Licínio de Almeida
- Country: Brazil
- Region: Nordeste
- State: Bahia

Population (2020)
  - Total: 12,373
- Time zone: UTC−3 (BRT)

Licínio de Almeida is a municipality in the state of Bahia in the North-East region of Brazil.

== History ==
The first explorers of the territory were the Portuguese bandeirantes in search of gold and precious stones. At the beginning of the 19th century, farmers from other municipalities settled there and developed agriculture. The city originated from the village formed around the Gado Bravo farm, owned by the Soares family. With the arrival of the tracks of the Eastern Brazilian Federal Railway Network in the 1940s, the town of Gado Bravo was formed. This village was elevated to a district in 1953, now named after Licínio de Almeida, an engineer for the Federal Railway Network who lived there and died. It was finally emancipated in 1962.

== See also ==
- List of municipalities in Bahia
