= Rafael Costa (footballer, born 1991) =

Brazilian footballer

Personal information
- Full name: Rafael Eduardo Costa
- Date of birth: 19 January 1991 (age 35)
- Place of birth: Araras, Brazil
- Height: 1.83 m (6 ft 0 in)
- Position: Attacking midfielder

Youth career
- Rio Claro
- Benfica

Senior career*
| Years | Team | Apps | (Gls) |
| 2010–2012 | Benfica | 0 | (0) |
| 2010 | → Fátima (loan) | 3 | (0) |
| 2011 | → Guaratinguetá (loan) | 3 | (0) |
| 2012 | → Rio Claro (loan) | 18 | (8) |
| 2012–2013 | Guarani | 18 | (1) |
| 2013 | Bragantino | 12 | (0) |
| 2014 | Rio Claro | 10 | (3) |
| 2014 | Criciúma | 10 | (0) |
| 2015 | Penapolense | 12 | (1) |
| 2015 | Paraná | 33 | (7) |
| 2016–2017 | Red Bull Brasil | 14 | (1) |
| 2016 | → Paysandu (loan) | 20 | (0) |
| 2017 | → São Bernardo (loan) | 10 | (1) |
| 2017–2018 | Moreirense | 21 | (2) |
| 2018–2020 | Boavista | 46 | (4) |
| 2020 | Damac | 3 | (1) |
| 2021 | São Bernardo | 13 | (2) |
| 2021–2022 | Najran | | |
- * Club domestic league appearances and goals as of 21:17, 1 April 2021 (UTC)

Rafael Eduardo Costa (born 19 January 1991) is a Brazilian professional footballer who plays as an attacking midfielder.

== Career ==
On 8 July 2017 Costa signed a one-year deal with Moreirense F.C. He scored on his debut against C.D. Aves on 30 July 2017. On 30 August 2021, Costa joined Najran.
