= Estádio Parque do Sabiá =

Multi-use stadium in Uberlândia, Brazil

Coordinates: 18°54′50″S 48°13′57″W

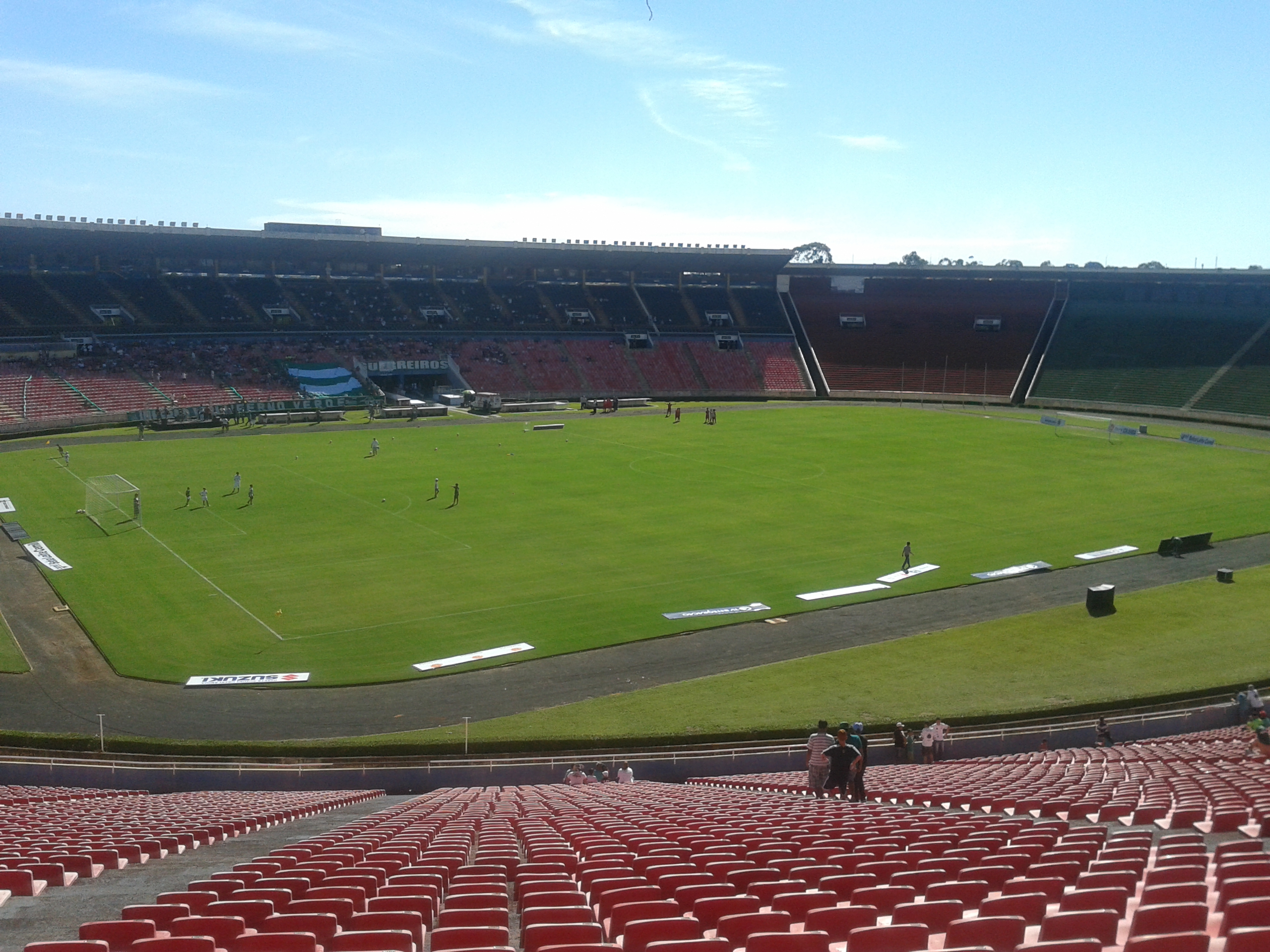
- Sisbrace
- Interactive map of Estádio Parque do Sabiá
- Full name: Estádio Municipal João Havelange
- Location: Uberlândia, Brazil
- Owner: Uberlândia City Hall
- Capacity: 39,990
- Surface: Grass
- Field size: 105m x 68m

Construction
- Opened: May 27, 1982

Tenants
- Uberlândia Esporte Clube; Clube Atlético Portal

The Estádio Municipal Parque do Sabiá, also known as Parque do Sabiá ("Thrush Park"), is a multi-use stadium in Uberlândia, Brazil. It is currently used mostly for football matches. It is the home ground of Uberlândia Esporte Clube and Clube Atlético Portal, and is the biggest stadium in Minas Gerais state countryside. The stadium was built in 1982 and was able to hold 53,350 people. It is owned by the Uberlândia City Hall.

== History ==
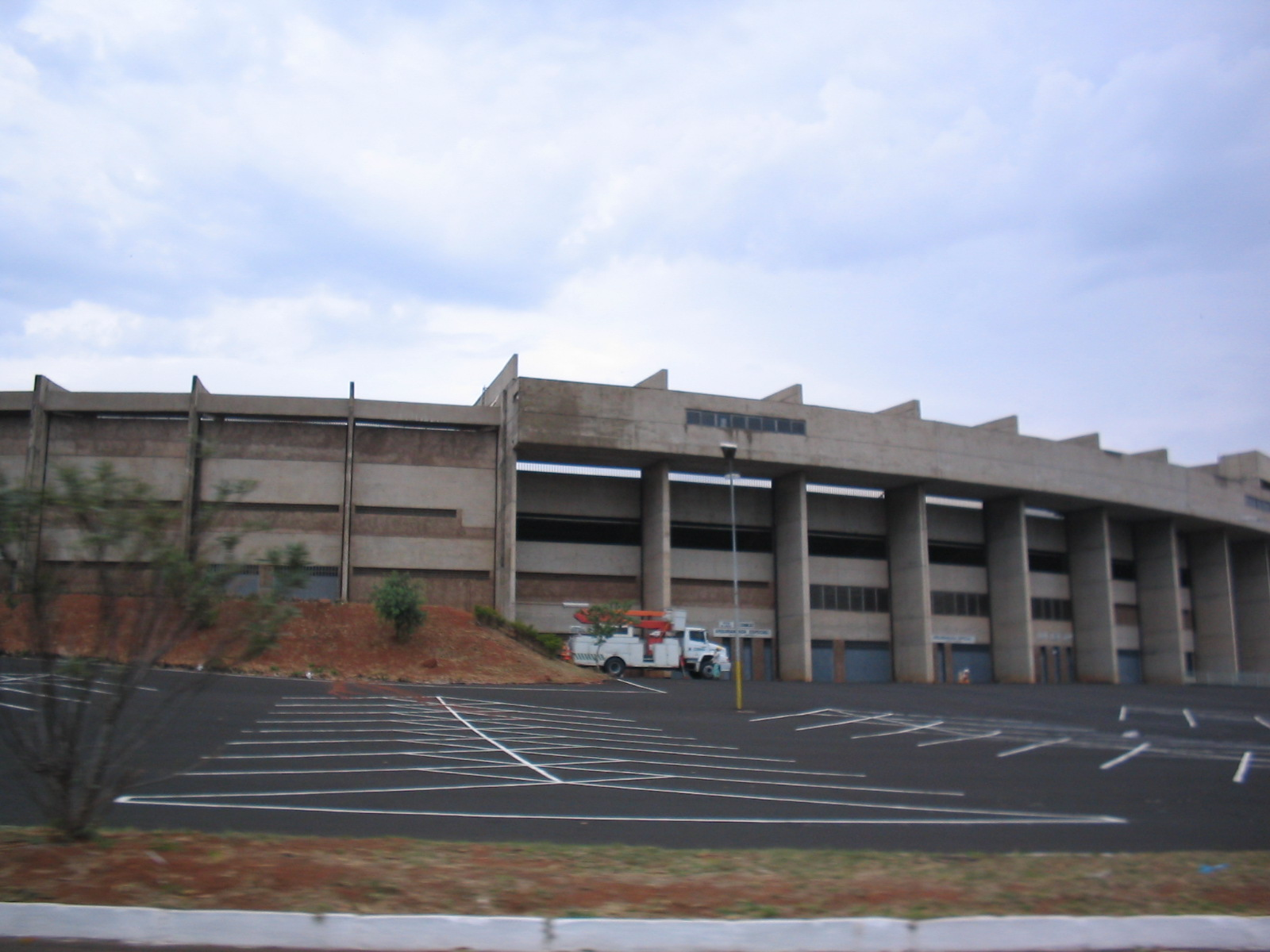
Estádio Parque do Sabiá

The stadium was inaugurated on May 27, 1982, as Parque do Sabiá (meaning Thrush's Park).

In 1995, the stadium was renamed to Estádio Municipal João Havelange (João Havelange Municipal Stadium, after FIFA's then-president João Havelange), at the suggestion of city councillor Leonídio Bouças. However, the name change was not very popular among the city's football fans, and the stadium was still commonly called the Parque do Sabiá.

The inaugural match was played on May 27, 1982, when the Brazil national football team beat the Republic of Ireland national football team 7–0. The first goal of the stadium was scored by Brazil's Falcão.

The stadium's attendance record currently stands at 80,000, set on the inaugural match.

In 2015, the stadium was renamed back to Estádio Municipal Parque do Sabiá, due to FIFA scandals involving Havelange. Its current capacity is 39,990.
