= North Esporte Clube =

Football club in Minas Gerais, Brazil

North
- Full name: North Esporte Clube
- Nicknames: Rei do Norte (King of the North); Gladiador do Norte (Northern Gladiator)
- Founded: 27 June 2022; 4 years ago
- Ground: Estádio Juvêncio Augusto Soares
- Capacity: 4,600
- President: Victor Felipe Oliveira
- Head coach: Kléberson
- League: Campeonato Mineiro
- 2025: Mineiro Módulo II, 1st of 12 (champions)
- Website: northesporteclube.com.br
Home colours	Away colours

North Esporte Clube is a Brazilian football club based in Montes Claros, Minas Gerais. They compete in the Campeonato Mineiro, the first level of Minas Gerais state football.

== History ==
North Esporte Clube was announced in June 2022 as Montes Claros' first professional team since the demise of Montes Claros Esporte Clube. The club began as a partnership between former Athletic Club (MG) owner Victor Felipe Oliveira, and Montes Claros América Vôlei owner Andrey Souza. It entered the Campeonato Mineiro Segunda Divisão, the third tier of the Federação Mineira de Futebol's leagues, and won promotion as champions in its first season; in the final, it defeated Coimbra Sports after an aggregate draw in the final, due to having the better regular season.

In August 2025, North won the Campeonato Mineiro Módulo II with a single goal by Luiz Thiago in the two-legged final against URT. Days after the result, the club appointed 2002 FIFA World Cup-winning former player Kléberson as the new manager.

On 11 January 2026, North made its debut in the top-flight Campeonato Mineiro, in a goalless draw away to URT. After finishing runners-up to Cruzeiro in the group stage, the club qualified for the Troféu Inconfidência, and defeated Uberlândia on penalties in the semi-finals, and URT 3–1 on aggregate in the final, thereby qualifying for the Copa do Brasil.

== Honours ==
- Campeonato Mineiro Módulo II
  - Winners (1): 2025
- Campeonato Mineiro Segunda Divisão
  - Winners (1): 2022
- Troféu Inconfidência
  - Winners (1): 2026

== Appearances ==
The following is a history of North's participation in state championships.

Season	Division	Final position
2022	3rd	1st
2023	2nd	8th
2024	2nd	4th
2025	2nd	1st
2026	1st	5th
