= Vila Operária Clube Esporte Mariano =

VOCEM
- Full name: Vila Operária Clube Esporte Mariano
- Nickname: Esquadrão da Fé (Faith Squad)
- Founded: 21 July 1954; 71 years ago
- Ground: Tonicão
- Capacity: 8,525
- President: Lauro Carlos Valim Silveira
- Head Coach: Carlinhos Alves
- League: Campeonato Paulista Série A4
- 2025: Paulista Série A4, 10th of 16
Home colours	Away colours

Vila Operária Clube Esporte Mariano, commonly referred to as VOCEM, is a Brazilian professional football club based in Assis, São Paulo. They currently compete in the Campeonato Paulista Segunda Divisão, the fourth tier of the São Paulo state football league.
