= Troféu Inconfidência =

- Organiser(s): FMF
- Founded: 2020
- Region: Minas Gerais, Brazil
- Teams: 4
- Related competitions: Campeonato Mineiro
- Current champions: North (1st title)
- Most championships: Athletic (2 titles)

The Troféu Inconfidência is a tournament organized by the Federação Mineira de Futebol. The name of the competition is a tribute to the Inconfidência Mineira movement.

It reunites the Brazilian clubs that qualified between the 5th and 8th position of the first stage of the Campeonato Mineiro - Módulo I. The tournament serves as a qualifier for the Campeonato Brasileiro Série D.

== List of champions ==
Following is the list with all the champions of the Troféu Inconfidência.

Season	Champions	Runners-up
2020	Uberlândia (1)	Cruzeiro
2021	Pouso Alegre (1)	URT
2022	Democrata (GV) (1)	Tombense
2023	Tombense (1)	Villa Nova
2024	Athletic (1)	Pouso Alegre
2025	Athletic (2)	Uberlândia
2026	North (1)	URT

Notes

- In the 2020 edition, Cruzeiro EC refused to play against Uberlândia EC, as its opponent team was suffering with 13 players diagnosed with COVID-19, so they decided to giveaway the title.

=== Titles by team ===
Rank	Club	Winners	Winning years
1	Athletic	2	2024, 2025
2	Democrata (GV)	1	2022
2	North	1	2026
2	Pouso Alegre	1	2021
2	Tombense	1	2023
2	Uberlândia	1	2020
