= Uberlândia Esporte Clube =

Brazilian football team

UberLÂNDIA
- Full name: Uberlândia Esporte Clube
- Nicknames: Verdão; Furacão Verde da Mogiana; Alviverde do Triângulo; Máquina Verde
- Founded: 1 November 1922 (104 years ago)
- Ground: Estádio Parque do Sabiá
- Capacity: 53,350
- Chairman: Renio Carlos Garcia
- Manager: Rogério Henrique
- League: Campeonato Brasileiro Série D Campeonato Mineiro
- 2025 2025: Série D, 44th of 64; Mineiro, 6th of 12
Home colors	Away colors

Uberlândia Esporte Clube (stylized as UberLÂNDIA Esporte Clube), usually known simply as Uberlândia and whose acronym is UEC, is a Brazilian football team from the city of Uberlândia in Minas Gerais State who currently play in Série D, the fourth tier of the Brazilian football league system, as well as in the Campeonato Mineiro, the top tier of the Minas Gerais state football league. Founded in 1922, they play their home games at Estádio Parque do Sabiá. The club colors are green and white and their nicknames include "Verdão" (The Big Green) and "Furacão Verde da Mogiana" (The Green Hurricane from Mogiana).

== History ==
Uberlândia Esporte Clube was founded on 1 November 1922 in Uberlândia, Minas Gerais.

On 2 April 2026, American ridesharing and delivery company Uber reached an agreement with Uberlândia to purchase the club's naming rights. With this, the Brazilian team will now be called UberLÂNDIA, in a move that plays on the similarity between the brand name and the city, and reinforces the company's presence in football.

On 1 November 2026, a mass brawl occurred during a match between Uberlândia and Mamoré for the Campeonato Mineiro Under-20 Second Division. This resulted in the referee abandoning the match and giving a total of 53 red cards, which became the new world record for the most red cards given in one match.

== Honours ==
=== Official tournaments ===
National
Competitions	Titles	Seasons
Campeonato Brasileiro Série B	1	1984
Campeonato Brasileiro Série D	1	2026
State
Competitions	Titles	Seasons
Taça Minas Gerais	1	2003
Campeonato Mineiro Módulo II	3	1962, 1999, 2015

=== Others tournaments ===
==== State ====
- Campeonato Mineiro do Interior (5): 1968, 1970, 1979, 1983, 1986
- Troféu Inconfidência (1): 2020
- Torneio Início do Campeonato Mineiro (1): 1983

==== City ====
- Campeonato Amador de Uberlândia (7): 1943, 1944, 1945, 1951, 1958, 1959, 1964
- Torneio Início de Uberlândia (1): 1944

=== Runners-up ===
- Copa João Havelange Group Green and White (1): 2000
- Taça Minas Gerais (2): 1981, 2010
- Recopa Mineira (1): 2021
- Campeonato Mineiro Módulo II (4): 2005, 2008, 2019, 2023
