= 2024 CA Juventus season =

Juventus 2024 football season

Juventus-SP
2024 season
- Chairman: Antonio Ruiz Gonsalez
- Manager: Jorginho (from 17 January 2024 until 31 January 2024) Sérgio Soares (from 3 February 2024 until 6 April 2024) Marcel Barbosa (from 15 June 2024 until 31 August 2024)
- Stadium: Rua Javari
- Série A2: Semifinals
- Copa Paulista: First round
- Top goalscorer: League: Léo Castro; Thiago Rubim; Pedro Arthur; Guilherme Liberato; All: Léo Castro (7)
Home colours	Away colours	Third colours

The 2024 season is the 94th season in the history of Clube Atlético Juventus. It covers the period from January 2024 to August 2024. The Série A2 campaign began in the first half of January, with matches against São Bento on the 17th. This season Juventus celebrated the centenary.

== Squad ==
As of 31 August 2024

Note: Flags indicate national team as defined under FIFA eligibility rules; some limited exceptions apply. Players may hold more than one non-FIFA nationality.

No.	Pos.	Nation	Player
1	GK	BRA	Caio Alan
2	DF	BRA	Marcel
3	DF	BRA	Guilherme Mattis
4	DF	BRA	Rayne Assis
5	MF	BRA	Guilherme Borges
6	DF	BRA	Cesinha
7	FW	BRA	Cesinha
8	MF	BRA	Guilherme Liberato
9	DF	BRA	Léo Castro
10	MF	BRA	Masson
11	FW	BRA	Gabriel Justino
12	GK	BRA	André Dias
13	DF	BRA	Diego Ferreira
14	DF	BRA	Kesley
15	DF	BRA	Iago Motta
16	DF	BRA	Betinho
17	MF	BRA	Valderrama
18	MF	BRA	Lissandro
19	FW	BRA	Thiago Rubim
20	FW	BRA	Marlon Martins
21	MF	BRA	Guthierres
23	FW	BRA	Andrey Quintino
24	FW	BRA	Jair

No.	Pos.	Nation	Player
2	DF	BRA	Davison Dutra
3	DF	BRA	Lucas Silva
4	DF	BRA	Renan Diniz
5	DF	BRA	Léo Couto
5	DF	BRA	Lucas Lucena
6	DF	BRA	Luan Gama
7	FW	BRA	Maikinho
8	MF	BRA	Luis Fernando
8	MF	BRA	Matheus Neris
9	MF	BRA	Marquinhos Brazion
10	MF	BRA	Nathan Barbosa
11	MF	BRA	Isaías
13	DF	BRA	Júnior Santos
14	DF	BRA	Hebert
14	DF	BRA	Caxambu
16	MF	BRA	Matheus Devellard
—	GK	BRA	Pedro Suzini
16	FW	BRA	Daniel Dias
18	FW	BRA	Guilherme Vieira
19	MF	BRA	João Lucas
19	MF	BRA	Pedro Arthur
20	FW	BRA	Trindade
21	FW	BRA	Carlos Eduardo

== Transfers ==
=== Transfers in ===
#	Position:	Player	Transferred from	Fee	Date	Team	Source
3	DF	(Brazil) Lucas Silva	(Brazil) União Rondonópolis	Free agent	1 January 2024	First team	
9	MF	(Brazil) Marquinhos Brazion	(Brazil) Real Brasília	Undisclosed	19 July 2024	First team	
13	DF	(Brazil) Júnior Santos	(Brazil) Atlético Cearense	Undisclosed	18 July 2024	First team	
5	DF	(Brazil) Lucas Lucena	(Brazil) Avenida	Free Agent	3 July 2024	First team	
2	DF	(Brazil) Davison Dutra	(Brazil) Real Noroeste	Undisclosed	1 January 2024	First team	
4	DF	(Brazil) Renan Diniz	(Brazil) União Suzano	Undisclosed	7 June 2024	First team	
7	FW	(Brazil) Maikinho	(Brazil) XV Piracicaba	Undisclosed	24 May 2024	First team	
7	DF	(Brazil) Pedro Arthur	(Brazil) FK RFS	Free Agent	23 May 2024	First team	
10	MF	(Brazil) Nathan Barbosa	(Brazil) Monte Azul	Undisclosed	1 January 2024	First team	
14	MF	(Brazil) Hebert	(Brazil) Ipatinga	Undisclosed	1 April 2024	First team	
14	MF	(Brazil) Isaías	(Brazil) VOCEM	Undisclosed	15 June 2024	First team	
14	MF	(Brazil) Léo Couto	(Brazil) VOCEM	Undisclosed	15 June 2024	First team	
8	MF	(Brazil) Matheus Neris	(Brazil) Marcílio Dias	Undisclosed	22 August 2024	First team	
8	MF	(Brazil) Luis Fernando	(Brazil) CRAC	Free Agent	16 May 2024	First team	
6	Df	(Brazil) Luan Gama	(Brazil) Sampaio Corrêa-RJ	Free Agent	16 May 2024	First team	
24	FW	(Brazil) Jair	(Brazil) Nacional-PB	Undisclosed	23 March 2024	First team	
20	FW	(Brazil) Trindade	(Brazil) Inter Bebedouro	Free Agent	20 February 2024	First team	
19	MF	(Brazil) João Lucas	(Brazil) Ponte Preta	Undisclosed	10 March 2024	First team	
19	MF	(Brazil) Matheus Devellard	(Brazil) Fluminense	Undisclosed	1 July 2024	First team	
16	MF	(Brazil) Matheus Devellard	(Brazil) Fluminense	Undisclosed	1 July 2024	First team	
16	MF	(Brazil) Guthierres	(Brazil) Monte Azul	Free Agent	2 May 2024	First team	
14	DF	(Brazil) Caxambu	FC West Armenia	Free Agent	19 January 2024	First team	
17	MF	(Brazil) Valderrama	(Brazil) Tupan-MA	Undisclosed	11 January 2024	First team	
5	MF	(Brazil) Guilherme Borges	(Brazil) Uruaçu	Free Agent	4 January 2024	First team	
1	GK	(Brazil) Caio	(Brazil) Uruaçu	Free Agent	3 January 2024	First team	
6	DF	(Brazil) Cesinha	(Brazil) Juventus-SC	Free Agent	11 January 2024	First team	
13	DF	(Brazil) Diego Ferreira	(Brazil) Tombense	Free Agent	16 January 2024	First team	
2	DF	(Brazil) Marcel	(Brazil) Bahia de Feira	Free Agent	11 January 2024	First team	
7	FW	(Brazil) Cesinha	(Brazil) Betim Futebol	Free Agent	9 January 2024	First team	
9	FW	(Brazil) Léo Castro	(Brazil) Marília	Free Agent	1 January 2024	First team	
19	FW	(Brazil) Thiago Rubim	(Brazil) Grêmio Prudente	Free Agent	1 January 2024	First team	
19	FW	(Brazil) Thiago Rubim	(Brazil) Grêmio Prudente	Free Agent	1 January 2024	First team	
18	MF	(Brazil) Lissandro	(Brazil) São José-RS	Free Agent	1 January 2024	First team	
4	DF	(Brazil) Rayne	(Brazil) Inter Limeira	Free Agent	1 January 2024	First team	
3	DF	(Brazil) Guilherme Mattis	(Brazil) Santo André	Free Agent	1 January 2024	First team	

=== Transfers out ===
#	Position	Player	Transferred to	Fee	Date	Team	Source
	MF	(Brazil) Jean Henrique	(Brazil) Itabaiana	Undisclosed	5 July 2024	First team	
19	MF	(Brazil) João Lucas	(Brazil) Ipatinga	Undisclosed	22 July 2024	First team	
20	FW	(Brazil) Trindade	(Brazil) Taquaritinga	Undisclosed	12 June 2024	First team	
6	DF	(Brazil) Cesinha	(Brazil) São Bento	Free Agent	6 June 2024	First team	
3	DF	(Brazil) Guilherme Mattis	(Brazil) Nova Iguaçu	Undisclosed	3 May 2024	First team	
	DF	(Brazil) Alan Uchôa	(Brazil) São Bernardo	Free Agent	3 May 2024	First team	
21	MF	(Brazil) Guthierres	(Brazil) Betim Futebol	Free Agent	7 July 2024	First team	
17		(Brazil) Caxambu	(Brazil) Veranópolis	Free Agent	18 April 2024	First team	
4	DF	(Brazil) Rayne Assis	(Brazil) Floresta-CE	Undisclosed	17 April 2024	First team	
9	FW	(Brazil) Léo Castro	(Brazil) North	Undisclosed	29 April 2024	First team	
16	MF	(Brazil) Matheus Devellard	(Brazil) Artsul	Undisclosed	1 July 2024	First team	
13	DF	(Brazil) Diego Ferreira	(Brazil) Floresta-CE	Free Agent	19 April 2024	First team	
	FW	(Brazil) Ruan Marcos	(Brazil) Itapirense	Undisclosed	18 January 2024	First team	
	DF	(Brazil) Isaque	(Brazil) Galícia EC	Free Agent	18 June 2024	First team	
	MF	(Brazil) João Torres	(Brazil) Primavera	Undisclosed	12 January 2024	First team	
	FW	(Brazil) Rhuan	(Brazil) Andraus Brasil	Undisclosed	15 January 2024	First team	
	FW	(Brazil) Athyrson	(Brazil) Altos	Free Agent	4 January 2024	First team	
	DF	(Brazil) Correia	(Brazil) Galo Maringá	Free Agent	1 January 2024	First team	
	GK	(Brazil) Fábio Szymonek	(Brazil) Sertãozinho	Free Agent	1 January 2024	First team	
3	DF	(Brazil) Lucas Silva	(Brazil) União Rondonópolis	Free Agent	1 January 2024	First team	

=== Loans in ===
#	Position	Player	Loaned from	Date	Loan expires	Team	Source
5	MF	(Brazil) Léo Couto	(Brazil) Catanduva	22 July 2024	1 January 2025	First team	
7	FW	(Brazil) Gabriel Justino	(Brazil) Apucarana Sports	23 July 2024	1 January 2025	First team	
8	MF	(Brazil) Guilherme Liberato	(Brazil) Botafogo-RJ	4 January 2024	16 April 2024	First team	
14	DF	(Brazil) Kesley	(Brazil) Novo Hamburgo	1 January 2024	16 April 2024	First team	
16	FW	(Brazil) Daniel Dias	(Brazil) Catanduva	15 June 2024	1 January 2025	First team	
18	FW	(Brazil) Guilherme Vieira	(Brazil) SKA Brasil	16 May 2024	31 December 2024	First team	
23	FW	(Brazil) Andrey Quintino	(Brazil) Santos	21 March 2024	11 April 2024	First team	

=== Loans out ===
#	Position	Player	Loaned from	Date	Loan expires	Team	Source
24	FW	(Brazil) Jair	(Brazil) Águia	16 June 2024	16 June 2025	First team	

== Squad statistics ==
As of 31 August 2024

No.	Pos.	Name	Campeonato Paulista Série A2		Copa Paulista		Total		Discipline	
No.	Pos.	Name	Apps	Goals	Apps	Goals	Apps	Goals	Yellow card	Red card
1	GK	(Brazil) Caio Alan	18	0	0	0	18	0	3	0
2	DF	(Brazil) Marcel	6	0	4	0	10	0	2	0
3	DF	(Brazil) Guilherme Mattis	13	0	0	0	13	0	4	0
4	DF	(Brazil) Rayne Assis	16	1	0	0	16	1	1	0
5	MF	(Brazil) Guilherme Borges	11	0	0	0	11	0	2	0
6	DF	(Brazil) Cesinha	13	0	0	0	13	0	1	0
7	FW	(Brazil) Cesinha	11	0	10	0	21	0	8	0
8	MF	(Brazil) Guilherme Liberato	15	0	0	0	15	0	8	1
9	FW	(Brazil) Léo Castro	16	7	0	16	7	0	0	0
10	MF	(Brazil) Masson	15	1	12	0	27	1	2	0
11	FW	(Brazil) Gabriel Justino	15	0	2	0	17	0	0	1
12	GK	(Brazil) André Dias	1	0	12	0	12	0	2	0
13	DF	(Brazil) Diego Ferreira	10	0	0	0	10	0	1	0
14	DF	(Brazil) Kesley	11	0	0	0	11	0	4	0
15	DF	(Brazil) Iago Motta	10	0	0	0	10	0	1	0
16	DF	(Brazil) Betinho	14	0	0	0	0	0	3	0
17	MF	(Brazil) Valderrama	4	0	0	0	4	0	0	0
18	MF	(Brazil) Lissandro	12	1	0	0	12	1	2	0
19	FW	(Brazil) Thiago Rubim	19	6	0	0	19	6	1	0
20	FW	(Brazil) Marlon Martins	12	1	4	1	16	2	1	0
21	MF	(Brazil) Guthierres	15	0	0	0	15	0	3	0
23	FW	(Brazil) Andrey Quintino	2	0	0	0	2	0	0	0
24	FW	(Brazil) Jair	4	0	0	0	4	0	0	0
2	DF	(Brazil) Davison Dutra	0	0	12	0	12	0	2	0
3	DF	(Brazil) Lucas Silva	0	0	4	0	4	0	0	0
4	DF	(Brazil) Renan Diniz	0	0	12	2	12	2	1	0
5	DF	(Brazil) Léo Couto	0	0	7	0	7	0	2	0
5	DF	(Brazil) Lucas Lucena	0	0	7	0	7	0	2	0
6	DF	(Brazil) Luan Gama	0	0	10	1	10	1	1	0
7	FW	(Brazil) Maikinho	0	0	10	2	10	2	4	1
8	MF	(Brazil) Luis Fernando	0	0	9	0	9	0	0	0
8	MF	(Brazil) Matheus Neris	0	0	8	1	8	1	1	0
9	MF	(Brazil) Marquinhos Brazion	0	0	7	2	7	2	4	1
10	MF	(Brazil) Nathan Barbosa	0	0	9	0	9	0	1	0
11	MF	(Brazil) Isaías	0	0	12	0	12	0	3	0
13	DF	(Brazil) Júnior Santos	0	0	6	0	6	0	3	0
14	DF	(Brazil) Hebert	0	0	6	0	6	0	1	0
14	DF	(Brazil) Caxambu	16	0	0	0	16	0	1	0
16	MF	(Brazil) Matheus Devellard	6	0	0	0	6	0	3	1
-	GK	(Brazil) Pedro Suzini	0	0	12	0	12	0	2	0
16	FW	(Brazil) Daniel Dias	0	0	9	0	9	0	1	0
18	FW	(Brazil) Guilherme Vieira	0	0	4	0	4	0	0	0
19	MF	(Brazil) João Lucas	1	0	0	0	1	0	0	0
19	MF	(Brazil) Pedro Arthur	0	0	10	2	10	2	3	0
20	FW	(Brazil) Trindade	1	0	0	0	1	0	1	0
21	FW	(Brazil) Carlos Eduardo	1	0	0	0	1	0	0	0

=== Goals ===
As of 31 August 2024

Rank	Player	A2	CP	Total
1	(Brazil) Léo Castro	7	0	7
2	(Brazil) Thiago Rubim	6	0	6
3	(Brazil) Marquinhos Brazion	0	2	2
3	(Brazil) Pedro Arthur	0	2	2
3	(Brazil) Maikinho	0	2	2
3	(Brazil) Marlon Martins	1	1	2
3	(Brazil) Renan Diniz	0	2	2
3	(Brazil) Guilherme Liberato	2	0	2
4	(Brazil) Matheus Neris	1	0	1
4	(Brazil) Iago Motta	1	0	1
4	(Brazil) Lissandro	1	0	1
4	(Brazil) Luan Gama	0	1	1
4	(Brazil) Rayne Assis	1	0	1
4	(Brazil) Masson	1	0	1
Own goals		0	0	0
Total		21	10	31

=== Assists ===
As of 31 August 2024

Rank	Player	A2	CP	Total
1	(Brazil) Guthierres	3	0	3
1	(Brazil) Léo Castro	3	0	3
2	(Brazil) Thiago Rubim	2	0	2
3	(Brazil) Kesley	1	0	1
3	(Brazil) Lissandro	1	0	1
3	(Brazil) Cesinha	1	0	1
3	(Brazil) Caxambu	1	0	1
3	(Brazil) Guilherme Mattis	1	0	1
3	(Brazil) Masson	1	0	1
3	(Brazil) Guilherme Liberato	1	0	1
3	(Brazil) Gabriel Justino	1	0	1
Total		16	0	16

=== Overall record ===
Competition	First match	Last match	Starting round	Final position	Record							
Competition	First match	Last match	Starting round	Final position	Pld	W	D	L	GF	GA	GD	Win %
Série A2	17 January 2024	13 April 2024	League phase	Semifinal	15	6	4	5	19	16	+3	40.00
Copa Paulista	15 June 2024	12 October 2024	Matchday 1	First round	12	3	6	3	11	14	−3	25.00
Total					27	9	10	8	30	30	+0	33.33

Source: Competitions

==== Matches ====
===== League first phase table =====
17 January 2024 1	Juventus-SP	0–1	São Bento	São Paulo
15:00 UTC−3		Report	Vitão 90+1'	Stadium: Rua Javari; Attendance: 944; Referee: Guilherme Nunes

21 January 2024 2	Ferroviária	2–1	Juventus-SP	Araraquara
17:00 UTC−3	Matheus Batista 16'; Lucas Rodrigues 47'	Report	Thiago Rubim 58'	Stadium: Fonte Luminosa; Attendance: 907; Referee: Marcio Mattos

24 January 2024 3	Juventus-SP	1–0	Velo Clube	São Paulo
15:00 UTC−3	Iago Motta 83'	Report		Stadium: Rua Javari; Attendance: 552; Referee: Leandro Carvalho

28 January 2024 4	Portuguesa Santista	2–1	Juventus-SP	Santos
11:00 UTC−3	Franco 88'; Léo Santos 90+4'	Report	Thiago Rubim 57'	Stadium: Estádio Ulrico Mursa; Attendance: 1,560; Referee: Gabriel Furlan

31 January 2024 5	Juventus-SP	1–1	Linense	São Paulo
15:00 UTC−3	Thiago Rubim 69'	Report	Luan Santos 83'	Stadium: Rua Javari; Attendance: 560; Referee: Lucas Bellote

3 February 2024 6	Capivariano	0–1	Juventus-SP	Capivari
15:00 UTC−3		Report	Lissandro 32'	Stadium: Arena Capivari; Attendance: 1,112; Referee: Thiago Mattos

7 February 2024 7	São José-SP	5–0	Juventus-SP	Capivari
20:00 UTC−3	João Gabriel 45+5'; Matheus Serafim 62' 90+1'; Jackson 73'; Luã Lúcio 87'	Report		Stadium: Arena Capivari; Attendance: 4,243; Referee: Paulo Cesar

10 February 2024 8	Juventus-SP	0–1	XV Piracicaba	São Paulo
15:00 UTC−3		Report	Daniel Costa 70' (pen.)	Stadium: Rua Javari; Attendance: 1,851; Referee: Guilherme Francisco

18 February 2024 9	Juventus-SP	3–0	Monte Azul	São Paulo
10:00 UTC−3	Thiago Rubim 23'; Rayne Assis 40'; Guilherme Liberato 71'	Report		Stadium: Rua Javari; Attendance: 2,083; Referee: Marcio Santos

21 February 2024 10	Primavera	1–1	Juventus-SP	Indaiatuba
15:00 UTC−3	Welliton 49'	Report	Marlon Martins 87'	Stadium: Ítalo Mário Limongi; Attendance: 549; Referee: Gabriel Bispo

25 February 2024 11	Juventus-SP	2–0	Taubaté	São Paulo
10:00 UTC−3	Léo Castro 9'; Guilherme Liberato 83'	Report		Stadium: Rua Javari; Attendance: 2,330; Referee: Salim Fende

2 March 2024 12	Rio Claro	1–1	Juventus-SP	Rio Claro
15:00 UTC−3	Cesinha 42'	Report	Masson 56'	Stadium: Dr. Augusto Schimidt Filho; Attendance: 570; Referee: Ilbert Silva

7 March 2024 13	Comercial	1–2	Juventus-SP	Ribeirão Preto
20:00 UTC−3	Diego Andradina 78'	Report	Léo Castro 10' 85' (pen.)	Stadium: Estádio Palma Travassos; Attendance: 239; Referee: Murilo Victor

10 March 2024 14	Juventus-SP	1–1	Noroeste	São Paulo
10:00 UTC−3	Matheus Blade 82'	Report	Léo Castro 90+4'	Stadium: Rua Javari; Attendance: 4,092; Referee: Guilherme Nunes

16 March 2024 15	Oeste	0–4	Juventus-SP	Campinas
15:10 UTC−3		Report	Léo Castro 10' 90'; Thiago Rubim 50' 59'	Stadium: Brinco de Ouro da Princesa; Attendance: 238; Referee: Thiago Scarascati

=== Bracket ===
Quarterfinals
Noroeste	1	2	3
São Bento	1	1	2
Velo Clube	2	2	4
São José-SP	1	1	2
Juventus-SP	1	0	1
Ferroviária	1	0	1
Portuguesa Santista	3	1	4
XV de Piracicaba	2	1	3

Semifinals
Noroeste	0	1	1
Portuguesa Santista	0	1	1
Juventus-SP	0	0	0
Velo Clube	1	0	1

Finals
Noroeste	0	1	1
Velo Clube	1	1	2

=== Quarterfinals Matches ===
24 March 2024 1	Juventus-SP	1–1	Ferroviária	São Paulo
10:00 UTC−3	Léo Castro 9073' (pen.)	Report	Matheus Batista 73'	Stadium: Rua Javari; Attendance: 3,901; Referee: Renan Pantoja

27 March 2024 2	Ferroviária	0–0	Juventus-SP	Araraquara
19:00 UTC−3		Report		Stadium: Fonte Luminosa; Attendance: 1,235; Referee: João Vitor Gobi

=== Semifinals Matches ===
31 March 2024 1	Juventus-SP	0–1	Velo Clube	São Paulo
11:10 UTC−3		Report	Caio Mancha 3'	Stadium: Rua Javari; Attendance: 4,307; Referee: Salim Fende

6 April 2024 2	Velo Clube	0–0	Juventus-SP	Rio Claro
15:10 UTC−3		Report		Stadium: Estádio Benito Agnelo Castellano; Attendance: 5,509; Referee: Vinicius Araujo

=== Copa Paulista ===
==== Group stage ====
15 June 2024 1	Juventus-SP	1-1	Portuguesa	São Paulo
15:00 UTC−3	Marlon Martins 52'	Report	Guilherme Portuga 24'	Stadium: Rua Javari; Attendance: 3,710; Referee: Murilo Victor

22 June 2024 2	São Caetano	2-2	Juventus-SP	São Caetano do Sul
15:00 UTC−3	Flávio Boaventura 5'; Wermeson 47'	Report	Pedro Arthur 11' 67'	Stadium: Estádio Anacleto Campanella; Attendance: 570; Referee: Fagson Jr

1 July 2024 3	Oeste	0-1	Juventus-SP	Santana de Parnaíba
15:00 UTC−3		Report	Renan Diniz 41'	Stadium: Gabriel Marques da Silva; Attendance: 158; Referee: Henrique Hengstmam

7 July 2024 4	Juventus-SP	1-1	São Bernardo	São Paulo
10:00 UTC−3	Matheus Neris 17'	Report	Rayan Corrêa 90'	Stadium: Rua Javari; Attendance: 1,578; Referee: Juliano Rodrigues

13 July 2024 5	União Suzano	2-2	Juventus-SP	Suzano
15:00 UTC−3	Renan Diniz 20'; Maikinho 27'	Report	Leonardo Ribeiro 30'; Matheus Soldado 65'	Stadium: Francisco Marques Figueira; Attendance: 170; Referee: Gabriel Bispo

20 July 2024 6	Portuguesa	1-1	Juventus-SP	São Paulo
15:00 UTC−3	Guilherme Portuga 45+2'	Report	Luan Gama 58'	Stadium: Canindé; Attendance: 2,579; Referee: Thiago Mattos

28 July 2024 7	Juventus-SP	0-1	São Caetano	São Paulo
10:00 UTC−3		Report	Allan 50'	Stadium: Rua Javari; Attendance: 1,946; Referee: Guilherme Francisco

4 August 2024 8	Juventus-SP	1-1	Oeste	São Paulo
10:00 UTC−3	Marquinhos Brazion 68'	Report	Gabryel Freitas 18'	Stadium: Rua Javari; Attendance: 1,062; Referee: Thiago Scarascati

11 August 2024 9	São Bernardo	3-0	Juventus-SP	Santo André
15:00 UTC−3	Gabriel Cunha 39'; Natanael 51'; Ruan Marcos 62'	Report		Stadium: Bruno José Daniel; Attendance: 146; Referee: Marcio Mattos

17 August 2024 10	Juventus-SP	1-0	União Suzano	São Paulo
15:00 UTC−3	Maikinho 60'	Report		Stadium: Rua Javari; Attendance: 929; Referee: Aparecido Bueno

=== Bracket ===
First round
União São João	0	1	1
XV de Jaú	0	0	0
Capivariano	2	1	3
São Caetano	1	0	1
Oeste	0	1	1
XV Piracicaba	1	2	3
VOCEM	0	0	0
Monte Azul	1	1	2
Juventus-SP	1	0	1
Taquaritinga	0	2	2
Francana	1	0	1
Votuporanguense	2	2	4
São Bento	0	0	0
Portuguesa	0	0	0
Comercial	1	1	2
Primavera	1	1	2

Quarterfinals
União São João	0	1	1
Taquaritinga	0	1	1
Portuguesa	1	2	3
XV Piracicaba	0	1	1
Comercial	0	0	0
Monte Azul	0	1	1
Capivariano	0	0	0
Votuporanguense	1	2	3

Semifinals
União São João	0	1	1
Monte Azul	0	2	2
Portuguesa	1	0	1
Votuporanguense	0	2	2

Finals
Votuporanguense	1	0	1
Monte Azul	0	1	1

==== Knockout stages ====
25 August 2024 1st Round	Juventus-SP	1–0	Taquaritinga	São Paulo
10:00 UTC−3	Marquinhos Brazion 7'	Report		Stadium: Rua Javari; Attendance: 965; Referee: Fabiano Santos

31 August 2024 1st Round	Taquaritinga	2–0	Juventus-SP	Taquaritinga
15:00 UTC−3	Luiz Fernando 52'; Israel 89'	Report		Stadium: Taquarão; Attendance: 1,343; Referee: Guilherme Santana
