= Cesinha =

Cesinha may refer to:

- Cesinha (footballer, born 1980), Carlos César dos Santos, Brazilian football winger
- Cesinha (footballer, born 1981), Luiz Cesar Barbieri, Brazilian football striker
- Cesinha (footballer, born 1986), Cesar Augusto Pereira Marques, Brazilian football defender
- Cesinha (footballer, born 1989), César Fernando Silva Melo, Brazilian football forward for Daegu FC
- Cesinha (footballer, born 1992), César Velez da Silva, Brazilian football forward for Phitsanulok
- Cesinha (footballer, born 1996), Mário César Belli, Brazilian football midfielder
- Cesinha (footballer, born 1997), César Rodrigues de Oliveira, Brazilian football winger for Villa Nova-MG
