= Gabriel Masson =

Brazilian footballer

Personal information
- Full name: Gabriel Luan Masson
- Date of birth: 1 July 2002 (age 24)
- Place of birth: Brazil
- Height: 1.68 m (5 ft 6 in)
- Position: Attacking midfielder / winger

Team information
- Current team: Grêmio Esportivo Brasil
- Number: 20

Youth career
- 2019–2023: Juventus-SP

Senior career*
Years	Team	Apps	(Gls)
2020–2024	Juventus-SP	32	(3)
2025	Manaus	19	(2)
2026	Rio Claro	17	(2)
2026–	Grêmio Esportivo Brasil	14	(0)
- * Club domestic league appearances and goals as of 3 September 2026

Gabriel Luan Masson (born 1 July 2002), sometimes known as just Masson, is a Brazilian footballer who plays as an attacking midfielder or winger for Grêmio Esportivo Brasil.

== Club career ==
=== Juventus-SP ===
Masson joined the youth academy of Clube Atlético Juventus in 2018. He represented the club in three editions of the Copa São Paulo de Futebol Júnior, in 2020, 2022 and 2023, and was one of the squad's standout performers in the 2022 edition, scoring four goals in five matches.

On 4 January 2023, in Juventus's opening match of that year's Copinha, Masson scored the winning goal from a penalty kick in second-half stoppage time of a 2–0 win over São Caetano at the Rua Javari stadium in Mooca. In his celebration, he lifted his jersey to reveal a second shirt underneath bearing the face of Pelé and the phrase Pelé Eterno, one week after the Brazilian icon's death, and was booked with a yellow card. The match was played at the same stadium where Pelé, then of Santos, had scored what he considered the most beautiful goal of his career, against Juventus in 1959.

In April 2023, having established himself as a starter for Juventus's first team during that season's Campeonato Paulista Série A2, Masson renewed his contract with the club to remain for the Copa Paulista. He continued with Juventus's first team through the 2024 season, making 27 appearances across the Série A2 and Copa Paulista that year.

=== Manaus ===
On 10 December 2024, Manaus Futebol Clube announced the signing of Masson, then 22 years old, for the 2025 season. He had come through Juventus-SP's youth categories, where he also played as a professional.

=== Rio Claro ===
On 26 November 2025, Rio Claro Futebol Clube announced the signing of Masson as one of six reinforcements for the club's 2026 Campeonato Paulista Série A3 campaign, as it sought an immediate return to the Série A2 following relegation.

=== Grêmio Esportivo Brasil ===
On 1 May 2026, Masson signed with Grêmio Esportivo Brasil (nicknamed Xavante), based in Pelotas, Rio Grande do Sul, to strengthen the club's midfield for the remainder of that year's Campeonato Brasileiro Série D, alongside the Recopa Gaúcha and Copa FGF competitions.

== Career statistics ==
As of match played 3 September 2026

Appearances and goals by club, season and competition
Club	Season	League			Cup		Continental		State League		Other		Total	
Club	Season	Division	Apps	Goals	Apps	Goals	Apps	Goals	Apps	Goals	Apps	Goals	Apps	Goals
Juventus-SP	2020	Paulista A2	0	0	0	0	0	0	0	0	1 (Note: Appearances in Copa Paulista)	0	1	0
Juventus-SP	2021	Paulista A2	0	0	0	0	0	0	1	0	0	0	1	0
Juventus-SP	2022	Paulista A2	0	0	0	0	0	0	7	1	6	0	13	1
Juventus-SP	2023	Paulista A2	0	0	0	0	0	0	9	1	9	1	18	2
Juventus-SP	2024	Paulista A2	0	0	0	0	0	0	15	1	12	0	27	1
Juventus-SP	Total		—		—		—		32	3	28	1	60	4
Manaus	2025	Série D	9	1	2	0	0	0	10	1	2 (Note: Appearances in the Copa Verde)	0	23	2
Rio Claro	2026	Paulista A3	0	0	0	0	0	0	17	2	0	0	17	2
Brasil de Pelotas	2026	Gaúcho Série A2	6	0	0	0	0	0	8	0	8 (Note: One appearance in the Recopa Gaúcha and seven in the Copa FGF, with three goals scores)	3	22	3
Career total			15	1	3	0	0	0	67	6	38	4	122	11
