= Igor Souza (footballer, born 2000) =

Brazilian footballer

Personal information
- Full name: Igor Roberto Oliveira de Souza
- Date of birth: 18 June 2000 (age 26)
- Place of birth: Itaquaquecetuba, Brazil
- Height: 1.85 m (6 ft 1 in)
- Position: Centre back

Youth career
- 2017–2019: Elosport
- 2019–2020: Portuguesa

Senior career*
Years	Team	Apps	(Gls)
2018–2019	Elosport	12	(0)
2021–2023	Portuguesa	2	(0)
- * Club domestic league appearances and goals as of 15:23, 17 March 2023 (UTC)

Igor Roberto Oliveira de Souza (born 18 June 2000), known as Igor Souza or just Igor, is a Brazilian footballer. Mainly a central defender, he can also play as a defensive midfielder.

== Club career ==
Born in Itaquaquecetuba, São Paulo, Igor was an Elosport youth graduate. He made his senior debut with the club during the 2018 Campeonato Paulista Segunda Divisão, and moved to Portuguesa in the following year, initially to the under-20 team.

Promoted to the first team for the 2021 season, Igor made his senior debut on 14 September 2021, coming on as a late substitute for Cesinha in a 2–1 home win over Juventus-SP, for the year's Copa Paulista. The following 4 February, after three more matches, he renewed his contract until May 2023.

Initially out of Lusa's list for the 2023 Campeonato Paulista, Igor was registered by the club in the place of injured Pedro Bortoluzo on 26 February 2023. He made his first match of the season on 5 March, replacing goalscorer João Victor in a 2–1 away win over Mirassol, as the club narrowly avoided relegation.

== Career statistics ==
As of 17 March 2023

Club	Season	League			State League		Cup		Continental		Other		Total	
Club	Season	Division	Apps	Goals	Apps	Goals	Apps	Goals	Apps	Goals	Apps	Goals	Apps	Goals
Elosport	2018	Paulista 2ª Divisão	—		12	0	—		—		—		12	0
Portuguesa	2021	Série D	0	0	—		—		—		4 (Note: Appearance(s) in Copa Paulista)	0	4	0
Portuguesa	2022	Paulista A2	—		0	0	—		—		1	0	1	0
Portuguesa	2023	Paulista	—		2	0	—		—		—		2	0
Portuguesa	Total		0	0	2	0	—		—		5	0	7	0
Career total			0	0	14	0	0	0	0	0	5	0	19	0

== Honours ==
Portuguesa

- Campeonato Paulista Série A2: 2022
