= Zé Vitor (footballer, born 2000) =

Brazilian footballer (born 2000)

Personal information
- Full name: José Vitor Silva Neves
- Date of birth: 2 May 2000 (age 26)
- Place of birth: Goiânia, Brazil
- Height: 1.94 m (6 ft 4 in)
- Position: Midfielder

Team information
- Current team: Vitória (on loan from Maringá)
- Number: 88

Youth career
- Atlético Goianiense
- Iporá
- 2019: Anapolina
- 2019–2020: Goiás

Senior career*
Years	Team	Apps	(Gls)
2020	Fabril Barreiro	0	(0)
2020–2021	Belenenses SAD B	2	(0)
2021–2022	Vila Nova	0	(0)
2021	→ Goianésia (loan)	4	(0)
2021	→ ABD (loan)	4	(0)
2022	→ CEOV (loan)	9	(3)
2022–2024	São-Carlense	41	(7)
2023	→ Operário Ferroviário (loan)	4	(1)
2024	→ Maringá (loan)	16	(1)
2024–	Maringá	20	(3)
2024	→ Athletico Paranaense (loan)	9	(0)
2025	→ Mirassol (loan)	2	(0)
2026	→ Portuguesa (loan)	9	(1)
2026–	→ Vitória (loan)	2	(0)
- * Club domestic league appearances and goals as of 8 April 2026

José Vitor Silva Neves (born 2 May 2000), commonly known as Zé Vitor, is a Brazilian professional footballer who plays as a midfielder for Vitória, on loan from Maringá.

== Career ==
Born in Goiânia, Goiás, Zé Vitor represented the youth sides of Atlético Goianiense, Iporá, Anapolina and Goiás as a youth. In 2020, after finishing his formation, he moved to Portuguese side Fabril Barreiro, but joined Belenenses-SAD shortly after.

After only playing for their B-team, Zé Vitor signed for Vila Nova back in his home country on 5 April 2021, but was loaned to Goianésia on 25 May. Back to Vila on 12 September, he moved to ABD also in a temporary deal on 7 October.

In January 2022, Zé Vitor was loaned to CEOV for the 2022 Campeonato Mato-Grossense, but returned to Vila Nova in March. He moved to São-Carlense in the following month, before being loaned out to Operário Ferroviário on 28 November.

Back to São-Carlense in April 2023, after featuring rarely for Fantasma, Zé Vitor was a regular starter as the club narrowly missed out promotion in the Campeonato Paulista Segunda Divisão, and was announced on loan at Maringá on 30 November 2023. With the latter, he was a regular starter as they reached the 2024 Campeonato Paranaense finals and was subsequently bought outright.

On 13 April 2024, Zé Vitor was announced at Série A side Athletico Paranaense, on a one-year loan deal with a buyout clause. He made his club – and top tier – debut the following day, coming on as a late substitute for Agustín Canobbio in a 4–0 home routing of Cuiabá.

Rarely used at Athletico as the club suffered relegation, Zé Vitor returned to Maringá ahead of the 2025 campaign, helping the side to reach another Paranaense finals. On 17 March of that year, he agreed to join Mirassol in the top tier, also on loan.

On 9 July 2025, Zé Vitor returned to Maringá after just two matches at Mirassol. On 5 November, he was announced at Portuguesa on loan for the 2026 Campeonato Paulista.

== Personal life ==
Zé Vitor's older brother Marcus Vinícius is also a footballer. A forward, both played together at ABD in 2021.

== Career statistics ==
As of 18 March 2026.

Club	Season	League			State League (Note: Includes Campeonato Goiano Segunda Divisão, Campeonato Paulista Segunda Divisão, Campeonato Paranaense.)		Cup (Note: Includes Copa do Brasil.)		Continental		Other		Total	
Club	Season	Division	Apps	Goals	Apps	Goals	Apps	Goals	Apps	Goals	Apps	Goals	Apps	Goals
Belenenses-SAD B	2020–21	Campeonato de Portugal	2	0	—		—		—		—		2	0
Vila Nova	2021	Série B	0	0	0	0	0	0	—		0	0	0	0
Goianésia (loan)	2021	Série D	4	0	—		—		—		—		4	0
ABD (loan)	2021	Goiano 2ª Divisão	—		4	0	—		—		—		4	0
CEOV (loan)	2022	Série D	0	0	9	3	1	0	—		—		10	3
São-Carlense	2022	Paulista 2ª Divisão	—		18	1	—		—		—		18	1
São-Carlense	2023	Paulista 2ª Divisão	—		23	6	—		—		—		23	6
São-Carlense	Total		—		41	7	—		—		—		41	7
Operário Ferroviário (loan)	2023	Série C	0	0	4	1	1	0	—		—		5	1
Maringá	2024	Série D	0	0	16	1	2	0	—		—		18	1
Maringá	2025	Série C	8	1	12	2	1	1	—		—		21	4
Maringá	Total		8	1	28	3	3	1	—		—		39	5
Athletico Paranaense (loan)	2024	Série A	9	0	—		—		0	0	—		9	0
Mirassol (loan)	2025	Série A	2	0	—		—		—		—		2	0
Portuguesa (loan)	2026	Série D	0	0	9	1	2	0	—		—		11	1
Career total			25	1	95	15	7	1	0	0	0	0	139	17
