= Igor Souza =

Igor Souza may refer to:

- Igor Souza (footballer, born 1979), Brazilian football forward
- Igor Souza (footballer, born 2000), Brazilian football defender
