= Renner (footballer) =

Brazilian footballer

Personal information
- Full name: Renner de Souza Silva
- Date of birth: 24 February 2000 (age 26)
- Place of birth: Goiânia, Brazil
- Height: 1.85 m (6 ft 1 in)
- Position: Left-back

Team information
- Current team: Grêmio Prudente

Youth career
- –2017: Fluminense
- 2018–2019: Figueirense

Senior career*
Years	Team	Apps	(Gls)
2019	Figueirense	3	(0)
2019–2022	Al Jazira	2	(0)
2022	Anápolis-GO	3	(0)
2022–	Grêmio Prudente	11	(0)
- * Club domestic league appearances and goals as of 18:58, 26 May 2024 (UTC)

Renner de Souza Silva (born 24 February 2000), commonly known as Renner, is a Brazilian footballer who plays as a left-back for Gremio Prudente.

== Career statistics ==
=== Club ===
As of 26 October 2019.

Club	Season	League			State League		Cup		Continental		Other		Total	
Club	Season	Division	Apps	Goals	Apps	Goals	Apps	Goals	Apps	Goals	Apps	Goals	Apps	Goals
Figueirense	2019	Série B	3	0	0	0	0	0	0	0	1 (Note: Appearances in the Copa Santa Catarina)	1	4	1
Al Jazira	2019–20	UAE Pro League	0	0	–		0	0	0	0	0	0	0	0
Career total			3	0	0	0	0	0	0	0	1	1	4	1
