= Thiago Rubim =

Brazilian footballer

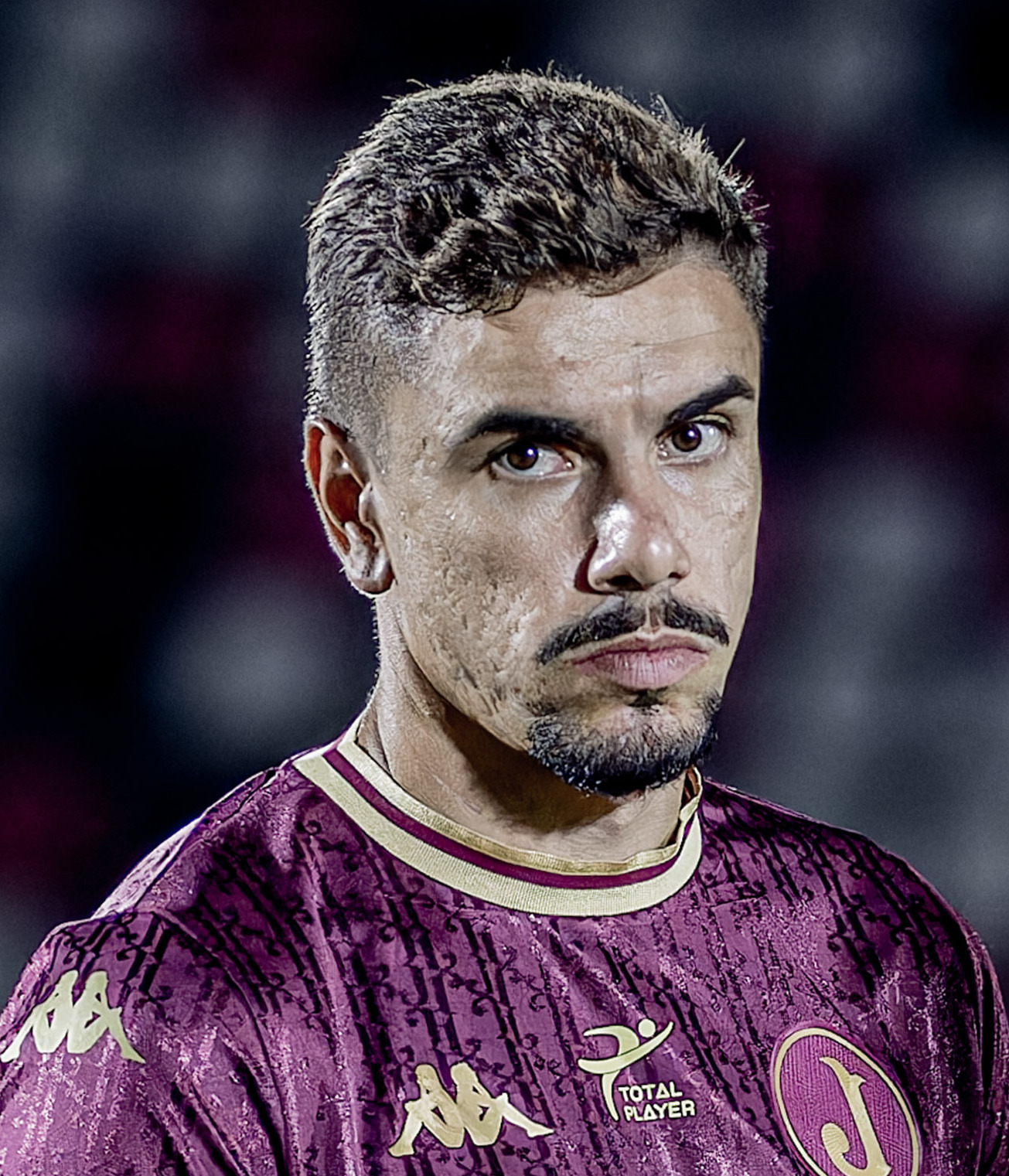
- Rubim as a player of Juventus-SP in 2024

Personal information
- Full name: Thiago Canavez Rubim
- Date of birth: 4 March 1999 (age 27)
- Place of birth: Franca, Brazil
- Height: 1.83 m (6 ft 0 in)
- Position: Winger

Team information
- Current team: Portuguesa (on loan from Atlético Tubarão)
- Number: 21

Youth career
- São Bernardo

Senior career*
Years	Team	Apps	(Gls)
2019–2020	Linense	13	(2)
2020	→ Bandeirante (loan)	14	(1)
2021	Grêmio Anápolis	8	(0)
2021	→ Goianésia (loan)	7	(1)
2021	→ ABD (loan)	10	(4)
2022	Rio Claro	19	(6)
2023	Velo Clube	16	(4)
2023	FC Cascavel	5	(1)
2023	Grêmio Prudente	0	(0)
2024	Juventus-SP	19	(6)
2024	→ Atlético Tubarão (loan)	10	(2)
2024–	Atlético Tubarão	0	(0)
2024	→ Marcílio Dias (loan)	0	(0)
2025	→ São José-SP (loan)	17	(5)
2025–2026	→ Pouso Alegre (loan)	30	(6)
2026–	→ Portuguesa (loan)	3	(0)
- * Club domestic league appearances and goals as of 18:23, 12 July 2026 (UTC)

Thiago Canavez Rubim (born 4 March 1999) is a Brazilian footballer who plays as a winger for Pouso Alegre, on loan from Atlético Tubarão.

== Career ==
Born in Franca, São Paulo, Rubim finished his formation with São Bernardo, before making his senior debut with Linense in the 2019 Copa Paulista.

Rubim served a loan stint at Bandeirante, and signed for Grêmio Anápolis in 2021, winning the Campeonato Goiano with the club. He later had another loan spells at Goianésia and ABD in that year, before returning to his native state with Rio Claro for the 2022 season.

On 19 November 2022, Rubim agreed to a deal with Velo Clube, and was regularly used before moving to FC Cascavel the following 14 April. He left the latter in July, and joined Grêmio Prudente on 7 August.

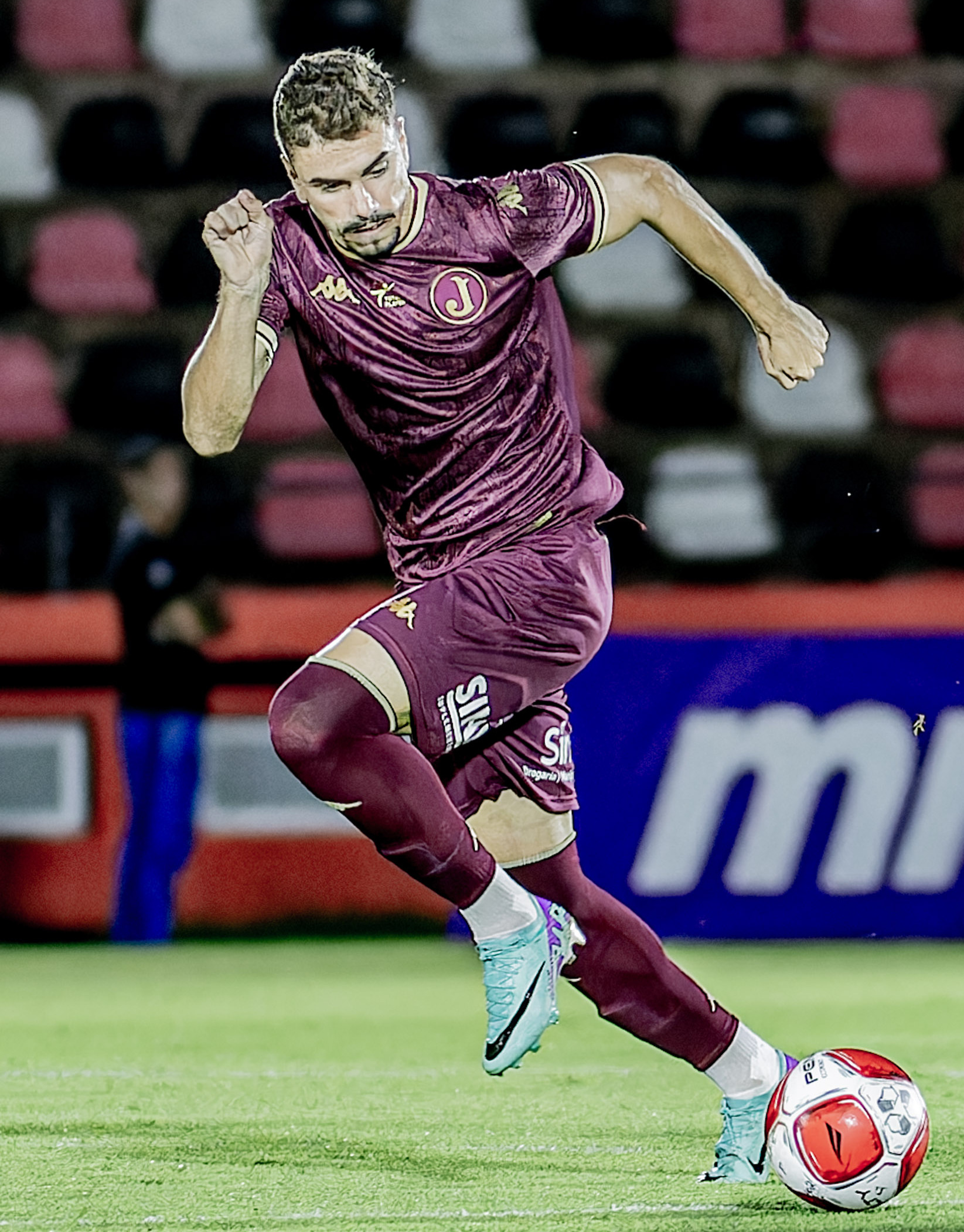
Rubim in action for Juventus-SP in 2024

Rubim terminated his link with Prudente on 6 December 2023, and was announced at Juventus-SP the following day. He was loaned to Atlético Tubarão in April 2024, before signing a permanent deal until 2027 with the club in August; he was then loaned to Marcílio Dias shortly after.

On 26 November 2024, Rubim was announced at São José-SP on loan. He moved to Pouso Alegre also in a temporary deal the following April, and was a regular starter before extending his loan deal in November.

On 18 April 2026, still owned by Tubarão, Rubim was announced at Portuguesa. In July, however, he suffered a knee injury, being sidelined for the remainder of the season.

== Career statistics ==
As of 12 July 2026

Club	Season	League			State League		Cup		Continental		Other		Total	
Club	Season	Division	Apps	Goals	Apps	Goals	Apps	Goals	Apps	Goals	Apps	Goals	Apps	Goals
Linense	2019	Paulista A2	—		—		—		—		17 (Note: Appearance(s) in Copa Paulista)	6	17	6
Linense	2020	Paulista A3	—		13	2	—		—		—		13	2
Linense	Total		—		13	2	—		—		17	6	30	8
Bandeirante (loan)	2020	Paulista 2ª Divisão	—		14	1	—		—		—		14	1
Grêmio Anápolis	2021	Goiano	—		8	0	—		—		—		8	0
Goianésia (loan)	2021	Série D	7	1	—		—		—		—		7	1
ABD (loan)	2021	Goiano 3ª Divisão	—		10	4	—		—		—		10	4
Rio Claro	2022	Paulista A2	—		19	6	—		—		—		19	6
Velo Clube	2023	Paulista A2	—		16	4	—		—		—		16	4
FC Cascavel	2023	Série D	5	1	—		—		—		—		5	1
Grêmio Prudente	2023	Paulista A3	—		—		—		—		6	0	6	0
Juventus-SP	2024	Paulista A2	—		19	6	—		—		—		19	6
Atlético Tubarão	2024	Catarinense Série B	—		10	2	—		—		—		10	2
Marcílio Dias (loan)	2024	Catarinense	—		—		—		—		5 (Note: Appearance(s) in Copa Santa Catarina)	0	5	0
São José-SP (loan)	2025	Paulista A2	—		17	5	—		—		—		17	5
Pouso Alegre (loan)	2025	Série D	13	4	—		—		—		—		13	4
Pouso Alegre (loan)	2026	Série D	9	1	8	1	—		—		—		17	2
Pouso Alegre (loan)	Total		22	5	8	1	—		—		—		30	6
Portuguesa (loan)	2026	Série D	3	0	—		—		—		—		3	0
Career total			37	7	134	31	0	0	0	0	28	6	199	44

== Honours ==
Grêmio Anápolis

- Campeonato Goiano: 2021
