= Grêmio Prudente =

Grêmio Prudente may refer to:

- Grêmio Barueri Futebol, an association football club called Grêmio Prudente from February 2010 to May 2011
- Grêmio Desportivo Prudente, an association football club established in 2005 as Oeste Paulista Esporte Clube
