= Gabriel Justino =

Gabriel Justino may refer to:

- Gabriel Justino (footballer, born 1998), Brazilian football forward
- Gabriel Justino (footballer, born 2006), Brazilian football defender and midfielder
