= Guilherme Borges =

Brazilian footballer (born 1999)

Personal information
- Full name: Guilherme Borges Neves
- Date of birth: 27 November 1999 (age 26)
- Place of birth: Goiânia, Brazil
- Height: 1.82 m (6 ft 0 in)
- Position: Midfielder

Team information
- Current team: Floresta
- Number: 28

Youth career
- –2017: Atlético Goianiense

Senior career*
| Years | Team | Apps | (Gls) |
| 2017–2019 | Atlético Goianiense | 1 | (0) |
| 2017–2018 | → Corinthians (loan) | 0 | (0) |
| 2019 | América-MG | 0 | (0) |
| 2020 | Villa Nova-MG | 0 | (0) |
| 2020 | Nacional de Muriaé | 10 | (1) |
| 2020–2021 | Jaraguá | 13 | (0) |
| 2021–2022 | Caldense | 30 | (0) |
| 2023 | Galo Maringá | 12 | (0) |
| 2023 | EC Santo André | 12 | (0) |
| 2024 | Paraná | 1 | (0) |
| 2025 | ASA | 26 | (0) |
| 2026– | Floresta | 16 | (0) |
- * Club domestic league appearances and goals as of 9 November 2026

Guilherme Borges Neves (born 27 November 1999), commonly known as Guilherme Borges, is a Brazilian footballer who currently plays as a midfielder for Floresta.

== Career statistics ==
=== Club ===
As of 2 February 2022.

| Club | Season | League | | | State League | | Cup | | Continental | | Other | | Total | |
| Club | Season | Division | Apps | Goals | Apps | Goals | Apps | Goals | Apps | Goals | Apps | Goals | Apps | Goals |
|---|---|---|---|---|---|---|---|---|---|---|---|---|---|---|
| Atlético Goianiense | 2017 | Série A | 0 | 0 | 1 (Note: Appearances in the Campeonato Goiano) | 0 | 0 | 0 | – | | 0 | 0 | 1 | 0 |
| Atlético Goianiense | 2018 | Série B | 0 | 0 | 0 | 0 | 0 | 0 | – | | 0 | 0 | 0 | 0 |
| Atlético Goianiense | 2019 | Série B | 0 | 0 | 0 | 0 | 0 | 0 | – | | 0 | 0 | 0 | 0 |
| Atlético Goianiense | Total | | 0 | 0 | 1 | 0 | 0 | 0 | 0 | 0 | 0 | 0 | 1 | 0 |
| América-MG | 2019 | Série B | 0 | 0 | 0 | 0 | 0 | 0 | – | | 0 | 0 | 0 | 0 |
| Villa Nova-MG | 2020 | Série D | 0 | 0 | 0 | 0 | 0 | 0 | – | | 0 | 0 | 0 | 0 |
| Nacional de Muriaé | 2020 | – | | | 10 (Note: Appearances in the Campeonato Mineiro Modulo II) | 1 | 0 | 0 | – | | 0 | 0 | 10 | 1 |
| Jaraguá | 2020 | – | | | 4 | 0 | 0 | 0 | – | | 0 | 0 | 4 | 0 |
| Jaraguá | 2021 | Série D | 0 | 0 | 9 | 0 | 1 (Note: Appearances in the Copa do Brasil) | 0 | – | | 0 | 0 | 10 | 0 |
| Jaraguá | Total | | 0 | 0 | 13 | 0 | 1 | 0 | 0 | 0 | 0 | 0 | 14 | 0 |
| Caldense | 2021 | Série D | 16 | 0 | 0 | 0 | 0 | 0 | – | | 0 | 0 | 16 | 0 |
| Caldense | 2022 | Série D | 0 | 0 | 1 (Note: Appearances in the Campeonato Mineiro) | 0 | 0 | 0 | – | | 0 | 0 | 1 | 0 |
| Caldense | Total | | 16 | 0 | 1 | 0 | 0 | 0 | 0 | 0 | 0 | 0 | 17 | 0 |
| Career total | | | 0 | 0 | 13 | 1 | 0 | 0 | 0 | 0 | 0 | 0 | 13 | 1 |
