= Marquinhos Brazion =

Brazilian footballer (born 2000)

Personal information
- Full name: Marcos Paulo Brazion
- Date of birth: 8 July 2000 (age 26)
- Place of birth: São Paulo, Brazil
- Height: 1.81 m (5 ft 11 1/2 in)
- Position: Right winger

Team information
- Current team: ASA

Youth career
- 2011–2016: Corinthians

Senior career*
Years	Team	Apps	(Gls)
2019	Joinville	0	(0)
2021	Ceará	6	(0)
2022	Monte Azul	13	(0)
2022	→ Grêmio Anápolis (loan)	12	(2)
2022–2023	A.D. Sanjoanense	17	(0)
2023	Comercial-SP	0	(0)
2024	Real Brasília	14	(0)
2024	Juventus-SP	7	(2)
2025	Democrata-GV	2	(0)
2025-2026	Joinville	26	(4)
2026	Inter de Limeira	7	(1)
2026-	ASA	9	(0)
- * Club domestic league appearances and goals as of 19 November 2026

Marcos Paulo Brazion (born 8 July 2000), known as Marquinhos Brazion, is a Brazilian professional footballer who plays as a right winger, and can also operate as an attacking midfielder, for ASA.

Born in São Paulo, Brazion came through the youth categories of Corinthians before moving to Joinville's youth ranks in 2019, where he also made his senior debut that year.

== Club career ==
After his first spell at Joinville in 2019, Brazion joined the youth categories of Ceará in 2020, going on to make his senior debut for the club the following year. He was part of the Ceará squad that won that year's Campeonato Brasileiro de Aspirantes.

In 2022, he signed for Monte Azul in the Campeonato Paulista Série A2, being loaned mid-season to Grêmio Anápolis for a Campeonato Brasileiro Série D campaign. He then moved abroad for the first time, joining Portuguese club A.D. Sanjoanense, where he made 20 appearances across the Liga 3 and the Taça de Portugal during the 2022–23 season.

Back in Brazil, Brazion signed for Comercial-SP in July 2023. The following year, he joined Real Brasília before transferring to Clube Atlético Juventus on 19 July 2024. With Juventus, he scored the only goal in a 1–0 first-leg win over Taquaritinga in the round of 16 of the 2024 Copa Paulista, before being sent off in the second leg, which Juventus lost 2–0, eliminating the club from the competition on aggregate.

In January 2025, Brazion joined Democrata-GV for the Campeonato Mineiro, starting the team's opening two matches of the competition. The following month, he returned to Joinville for a second spell, going on to make 33 appearances and score four goals across the 2025 season, his most prolific campaign to date, before also featuring in the early stages of the 2026 Campeonato Catarinense.

In February 2026, he was transferred to Inter de Limeira. He signed for ASA in April 2026 to reinforce the club's offensive line for its Campeonato Brasileiro Série D and Copa do Nordeste campaigns. He provided the assist for the winning goal in a 1–0 away win over Juazeirense in the Série D on 16 May 2026.

== Career statistics ==
As of 30 August 2026

Appearances and goals by club, season and competition
Club	Season	League			Cup		State League		Other		Total	
Club	Season	Division	Apps	Goals	Apps	Goals	Apps	Goals	Apps	Goals	Apps	Goals
Joinville	2019	Série D	—		—		—		12 (Note: Appearances in Copa Santa Catarina)	2	12	2
Ceará	2021	Cearense	—		—		6	0	3	0	9	0
Monte Azul	2022	Série A2	—		—		13	0	—		13	0
Grêmio Anápolis (loan)	2022	Série D	12	2	—		—		—		12	2
A.D. Sanjoanense	2022–23	Liga 3	17	0	3	0	—		—		20	0
Comercial-SP	2023	Série A2	—		—		—		7 (Note: Appearances in Copa Paulista)	0	7	0
Real Brasília FC	2024	Série D	8	0	1	0	6	0	1 (Note: Appearances in Copa Verde)	0	16	0
Juventus-SP	2024	Série A2	—		—		7	2	—		7	2
Democrata-GV	2025	Mineiro	—		—		2	0	—		2	0
Joinville	2025	Série D	14	2	—		7	2	12	0	33	4
Joinville	2026	Série D	—		—		5	0	—		5	0
Joinville	Total		14	2	—		12	2	12	0	38	4
Inter de Limeira	2026	Série A2	—		—		7	1	—		7	1
ASA	2026	Série D	8	0	—		—		2	0	10	0
Career total			59	4	4	0	53	5	37	2	153	11
