= Hebert (footballer, born 2002) =

Brazilian footballer

Personal information
- Full name: Hebert Pedro de Andrade Neto
- Date of birth: 13 April 2002 (age 24)
- Place of birth: Brazil
- Height: 1.88 m (6 ft 2 in)
- Position: Defender

Team information
- Current team: Nação

Senior career*
Years	Team	Apps	(Gls)
2020–2023	Bahia de Feira	6	(0)
2024	Ipatinga	6	(0)
2024	Juventus-SP	6	(0)
2025	Penapolense	14	(1)
2025	Ypiranga-BA	7	(0)
2025	Nação	5	(0)
2026	Fluminense-PI	8	(0)
2026–	Nação	11	(0)
- * Club domestic league appearances and goals as of 5 August 2026

Hebert Pedro de Andrade Neto (born 13 April 2002), known simply as Hebert, is a Brazilian footballer who plays as a defender for Nação.

== Club career ==
Hebert joined the youth academy of Athletico Paranaense in 2017, at under-15 level. He later moved to Bahia de Feira, in the state of Bahia, where he played for the club's under-20 side during the 2020–21 seasons.

While representing Bahia de Feira in the 2021 Campeonato Baiano, Hebert, then aged 19, was loaned to Atlético Mineiro's under-20 squad for the remainder of that year, with the parent club retaining an option to sign 50 per cent of his economic rights. He had made four appearances in the Bahia state championship for Bahia de Feira before the move.

Hebert remained associated with Bahia de Feira through the 2022 and 2023 seasons before leaving as a free agent for Ipatinga in January 2024. He was transferred to Juventus-SP, of São Paulo, in April 2024, also as a free agent.

In January 2025, Hebert signed for Penapolense. During the remainder of the 2025 season he also had spells with Ypiranga-BA and Nação, a Santa Catarina-based club. He moved to Fluminense-PI at the start of 2026, before returning to Nação later that year.

== Career statistics ==
As of match played 5 August 2026

Appearances and goals by club and season
Club	Season	League			State League		Cup		Continental		Other		Total	
Club	Season	Division	Apps	Goals	Apps	Goals	Apps	Goals	Apps	Goals	Apps	Goals	Apps	Goals
Bahia de Feira	2020	Série D	—		1	0	—		—		—		1	0
Bahia de Feira	2021	Série D	—		4	0	—		—		—		4	0
Bahia de Feira	2022	Série D	—		—		—		—		—		0	0
Bahia de Feira	2023	Série D	1	0	—		—		—		—		1	0
Bahia de Feira	Total		1	0	5	0	0	0	0	0	0	0	6	0
Ipatinga	2024	Série D	—		6	0	—		—		—		6	0
Juventus-SP	2024	Paulista A2	—		—		—		—		6 (Note: Appearance in Copa Paulista)	0	6	0
Penapolense	2025	Paulista Série A4	—		14	1	—		—		—		14	1
Ypiranga-BA	2025	Baiano Second Division	—		7	0	—		—		—		7	0
Nação	2025	Catarinense Série B	—		—		—		—		5 (Note: Appearance in Copa Santa Catarina)	0	5	0
Fluminense-PI	2026	Série D	—		6	0	2	0	—		—		8	0
Nação	2026	Catarinense Série B	—		11	0	—		—		—		11	0
Career total			1	0	49	1	2	0	0	0	11	0	63	1
