= Guilherme Mattis =

Brazilian footballer (born 1990)

Personal information
- Full name: Guilherme Cruz de Mattis
- Date of birth: 12 September 1990 (age 36)
- Place of birth: São Paulo, Brazil
- Height: 1.94 m (6 ft 4 in)
- Position: Centre back

Youth career
- 2010: Guarani

Senior career*
| Years | Team | Apps | (Gls) |
| 2010–2011 | Guarani | 5 | (0) |
| 2011–2018 | Bragantino | 126 | (11) |
| 2012 | → Ferroviário-CE (loan) | 7 | (1) |
| 2012 | → Santacruzense (loan) | 2 | (0) |
| 2014–2015 | → Fluminense (loan) | 11 | (0) |
| 2015–2016 | Vitória | 24 | (3) |
| 2017 | Santa Cruz | 9 | (0) |
| 2019 | CRB | 10 | (1) |
| 2019 | São Bento | 11 | (0) |
| 2020 | São Bernardo | 13 | (0) |
| 2021 | Caxias | 8 | (0) |
| 2021 | Ferroviária-SP | 9 | (0) |
| 2022 | Taubaté | 11 | (0) |
| 2022-2025 | Juventus-SP | 17 | (0) |
| 2023 | Novo Hamburgo | 10 | (1) |
| 2023 | Capital CF | 1 | (0) |
| 2023 | Santo André | 13 | (0) |
| 2024 | Nova Iguaçu | 12 | (1) |
- * Club domestic league appearances and goals as of 23:48, 16 August 2020 (UTC)

Guilherme Cruz de Mattis (born 12 September 1990 in São Paulo), known as Guilherme Mattis, is a Brazilian retired footballer who played as a centre back.

== Career ==
He began his career at Guarani before spells at Bragantino, joining Fluminense in October 2014. After leaving Fluminense following the 2015 Campeonato Carioca, he signed for Vitória, with whom he won the Campeonato Baiano in 2016. He went on to play for numerous clubs, mostly in the state of São Paulo. Mattis announced his retirement from professional football on 4 November 2025, at the age of 35.

=== Career statistics ===
As of match played 26 February 2025

Appearances and goals by club and season
| Club | Season | League | | | State League | | Cup | | Continental | | Other | | Total | |
| Club | Season | Division | Apps | Goals | Apps | Goals | Apps | Goals | Apps | Goals | Apps | Goals | Apps | Goals |
|---|---|---|---|---|---|---|---|---|---|---|---|---|---|---|
| Guarani | 2010 | Série A | 1 | 0 | — | | — | | — | | — | | 1 | 0 |
| Guarani | 2011 | Série B | — | | 4 (Note: Appearance in Paulista A2) | 0 | 1 | 0 | — | | — | | 5 | 0 |
| Guarani | Total | | 1 | 0 | 4 | 0 | 1 | 0 | 0 | 0 | 0 | 0 | 6 | 0 |
| Bragantino | 2011 | Série B | 1 | 0 | 0 | 0 | 0 | 0 | 0 | 0 | 0 | 0 | 1 | 0 |
| Bragantino | 2012 | Série B | 7 | 0 | 1 | 0 | 0 | 0 | 0 | 0 | 0 | 0 | 8 | 0 |
| Bragantino | 2013 | Série B | 10 | 1 | 4 | 0 | 2 | 0 | 0 | 0 | 0 | 0 | 16 | 1 |
| Bragantino | 2014 | Série B | 21 | 3 | 15 | 0 | 7 | 2 | 0 | 0 | 0 | 0 | 43 | 5 |
| Bragantino | 2017 | Série C | 17 | 2 | 19 | 4 | 2 | 0 | 0 | 0 | 0 | 0 | 38 | 6 |
| Bragantino | 2018 | Série C | 17 | 0 | 14 | 1 | 3 | 0 | 0 | 0 | 3 (Note: Appearance in Copa Paulista) | 0 | 37 | 1 |
| Bragantino | Total | | 73 | 6 | 53 | 5 | 14 | 2 | 0 | 0 | 3 | 0 | 143 | 13 |
| Ferroviário-CE | 2012 | Cearense | 0 | 0 | 7 | 1 | 0 | 0 | 0 | 0 | 0 | 0 | 7 | 1 |
| Santacruzense | 2012 | Paulista Série A2 | 0 | 0 | 2 | 0 | 0 | 0 | 0 | 0 | 0 | 0 | 2 | 0 |
| Fluminense | 2014 | Série A | 9 | 0 | 0 | 0 | 0 | 0 | 0 | 0 | 0 | 0 | 9 | 0 |
| Fluminense | 2015 | Série A | 0 | 0 | 2 | 0 | 0 | 0 | 0 | 0 | 0 | 0 | 2 | 0 |
| Fluminense | Total | | 9 | 0 | 2 | 0 | 0 | 0 | 0 | 0 | 0 | 0 | 11 | 0 |
| Vitória | 2015 | Série B | 23 | 3 | 0 | 0 | 0 | 0 | 0 | 0 | 0 | 0 | 23 | 3 |
| Vitória | 2016 | Série A | 0 | 0 | 1 | 0 | 0 | 0 | 0 | 0 | 0 | 0 | 1 | 0 |
| Vitória | Total | | 23 | 3 | 1 | 0 | 0 | 0 | 0 | 0 | 0 | 0 | 24 | 3 |
| Santa Cruz | 2017 | Série B | 9 | 0 | 0 | 0 | 0 | 0 | 0 | 0 | 0 | 0 | 9 | 0 |
| CRB | 2019 | Série B | 3 | 0 | 7 | 1 | 2 | 0 | 0 | 0 | 7 (Note: Appearance in Copa do Nordeste) | 0 | 19 | 1 |
| São Bento | 2019 | Série B | 11 | 0 | 0 | 0 | 0 | 0 | 0 | 0 | 0 | 0 | 11 | 0 |
| São Bernardo | 2020 | Paulista Série A2 | 0 | 0 | 13 | 0 | 0 | 0 | 0 | 0 | 4 | 0 | 17 | 0 |
| Caxias | 2021 | Série D | 0 | 0 | 8 | 0 | 1 | 0 | 0 | 0 | 0 | 0 | 9 | 0 |
| Ferroviária | 2021 | Série D | 9 | 0 | 0 | 0 | 0 | 0 | 0 | 0 | 0 | 0 | 9 | 0 |
| Taubaté | 2022 | Paulista Série A2 | 0 | 0 | 11 | 0 | 0 | 0 | 0 | 0 | 0 | 0 | 11 | 0 |
| Juventus-SP | 2022 | Paulista Série A2 | 0 | 0 | 0 | 0 | 0 | 0 | 0 | 0 | 6 | 0 | 6 | 0 |
| Juventus-SP | 2024 | Paulista Série A2 | 0 | 0 | 13 | 0 | 0 | 0 | 0 | 0 | 0 | 0 | 13 | 0 |
| Juventus-SP | 2025 | Paulista Série A2 | 0 | 0 | 4 | 0 | 0 | 0 | 0 | 0 | 0 | 0 | 4 | 0 |
| Juventus-SP | Total | | 0 | 0 | 17 | 0 | 0 | 0 | 0 | 0 | 6 | 0 | 23 | 0 |
| Novo Hamburgo | 2023 | Série D | 0 | 0 | 10 | 1 | 0 | 0 | 0 | 0 | 0 | 0 | 10 | 1 |
| Capital CF | 2023 | Campeonato Brasiliense | 0 | 0 | 1 | 0 | 0 | 0 | 0 | 0 | 0 | 0 | 1 | 0 |
| Santo André | 2023 | Série D | 13 | 0 | 0 | 0 | 0 | 0 | 0 | 0 | 0 | 0 | 13 | 0 |
| Nova Iguaçu | 2024 | Série D | 12 | 1 | 0 | 0 | 0 | 0 | 0 | 0 | 0 | 0 | 12 | 1 |
| Career total | | | 163 | 10 | 136 | 8 | 18 | 2 | 0 | 0 | 20 | 0 | 337 | 20 |
