= André Dias (footballer, born 1990) =

Brazilian footballer (born 1990)

Personal information
- Full name: André Dias Campos
- Date of birth: 6 January 1990 (age 36)
- Place of birth: São Paulo, Brazil
- Height: 1.87 m (6 ft 2 in)
- Position: Goalkeeper

Youth career
- 2008–2009: Corinthians

Senior career*
Years	Team	Apps	(Gls)
2010–2013	Corinthians	0	(0)
2010	→ Nacional-SP (loan)	25	(0)
2011–2013	→ Flamengo-SP (loan)	38	(0)
2014–2017	Juventus-SP	66	(0)
2017	Oeste	1	(0)
2018	Juventus-SP	14	(0)
2019	São Bernardo	10	(0)
2019–2025	Juventus-SP	64	(0)
- * Club domestic league appearances and goals as of 30 May 2026

André Dias Campos (born 6 January 1990), known as André Dias, is a Brazilian footballer who plays as a goalkeeper.

== Club career ==
André Dias first joined Juventus-SP as a futsal player and traces his ambition to pursue a professional career when he began playing field football at the club. In 2000, at the age of ten, he moved to Corinthians, where he spent a decade in the youth academy, winning the Copa São Paulo de Futebol Júnior in 2009 and earning call-ups to Brazilian youth national teams. He turned professional in 2010 and was loaned to clubs including Esporte Clube Noroeste with whom he gained promotion to the first division, and Flamengo de Guarulhos. After three years as a professional at Corinthians, Dias returned to Juventus in late 2013. He became a key figure during the club's 2014 Série A3 campaign, making several crucial saves and stopping multiple penalties, contributing to Juventus' promotion to the Série A2. As of early 2016, he remained at the club, targeting promotion to the top division.

In 2020, André Dias reached the milestone of 152 games in the match against São Bernardo, Dias defending the garnet and white colors, breaking the record previously held by former Midfielder Ivan (151 games), as the player with the most official games for Clube Atlético Juventus in the 21st century. And 3 years later he reached the 200 games played in Juventus during the Série A2. The club celebrated on the social medias: "A source of pride and celebration for Juventus".

== Career statistics ==
=== Club ===
As of match played 8 March 2025

Appearances and goals by club, season and competition
Club	Season	League			State league		National cup		Continental		Other		Total	
Club	Season	Division	Apps	Goals	Apps	Goals	Apps	Goals	Apps	Goals	Apps	Goals	Apps	Goals
Nacional-SP	2010	Paulista 2ª Divisão	—		25	0	—		—		—		25	0
Flamengo-SP	2011	Paulista A3	—		1	0	—		—		—		1	0
Flamengo-SP	2012	Paulista A3	—		13	0	—		—		—		13	0
Flamengo-SP	2013	Paulista A3	—		24	0	—		—		—		24	0
Flamengo-SP	Total		—		38	0	—		—		—		38	0
Juventus-SP	2014	Paulista A3	—		11	0	—		—		14 (Note: Appearances in Copa Paulista)	0	25	0
Juventus-SP	2015	Paulista A3	—		23	0	—		—		8	0	31	0
Juventus-SP	2016	Paulista A2	—		18	0	—		—		8	0	26	0
Juventus-SP	2017	Paulista A2	—		14	0	—		—		—		14	0
Juventus-SP	Total		—		66	0	—		—		30	0	96	0
Oeste	2017	Série B	1	0	—		—		—		—		1	0
Juventus-SP	2018	Paulista A2	—		14	0	—		—		17	0	31	0
São Bernardo	2019	Paulista A2	—		10	0	—		—		—		10	0
Juventus-SP	2019	Paulista A2	—		—		—		—		1	0	1	0
Juventus-SP	2020	Paulista A2	—		16	0	—		—		6	0	22	0
Juventus-SP	2021	Paulista A2	—		12	0	—		—		8	0	20	0
Juventus-SP	2022	Paulista A2	—		11	0	—		—		10	0	21	0
Juventus-SP	2023	Paulista A2	—		15	0	—		—		12	0	27	0
Juventus-SP	2024	Paulista A2	—		1	0	—		—		12	0	13	0
Juventus-SP	2025	Paulista A2	—		9	0	—		—		—		9	0
Juventus-SP	Total		—		64	0	—		—		49	0	113	0
Career total			1	0	217	0	—		—		96	0	314	0
