= Clube Atlético Bragantino =

Association football team in Brazil

- Full name: Clube Atlético Bragantino
- Nicknames: Leão (Lion); Massa Bruta (Brutal Mass); Braga
- Founded: January 8, 1928; 98 years ago
- Dissolved: 2020 (signed deal with Red Bull Brasil to form Red Bull Bragantino)
- Ground: Estádio Nabi Abi Chedid; Bragança Paulista, São Paulo state, Brazil
- Capacity: 17,724
- 2019: 1st (promoted)
| Home colors | Away colors |

The Clube Atlético Bragantino, or Bragantino as they were usually called, was a Brazilian football team from Bragança Paulista in São Paulo that was founded on 8 January 1928. On 5 April 2019 the team signed a deal with Red Bull Brasil to form Red Bull Bragantino in 2020.

They played in white shirts, shorts and socks. Its home stadium was the Estádio Nabi Abi Chedid.

== History ==
On 8 January 1928 former Bragança Futebol Clube members founded the Clube Atlético Bragantino.

In 1949 the club played in the Campeonato Paulista Second Division for the first time. In 1965 Bragantino was promoted to the Campeonato Paulista First Division for the first time. In 1966, however, the club was relegated to the Campeonato Paulista Second Division.

In 1988 Bragantino was the Campeonato Paulista Second Division champion. In 1989 the club was promoted to the Campeonato Brasileiro Série A for the first time after winning the Campeonato Brasileiro Série B. In 1990 Bragantino defeated the Novorizontino to win the Campeonato Paulista First Division. The final was nicknamed the caipira final (final caipira, in Portuguese language).

In 1991 the club was the Campeonato Brasileiro Série A runner-up. In the final, Bragantino was defeated by São Paulo. In 1992 the club competed in the Copa CONMEBOL, debuting in international competitions. In 1993 Bragantino competed in the Copa CONMEBOL for the second time. In 1995 the club was relegated to the Campeonato Paulista Second Division. In 1996 Bragantino competed in the Copa CONMEBOL for the third time.

In 1998 the club was relegated to the Campeonato Brasileiro Série B. In 2002, after a poor campaign, Bragantino were relegated to the Campeonato Brasileiro Série C. In 2005 the club was promoted to the Campeonato Paulista First Division. In 2007 Bragantino won the Campeonato Brasileiro Série C thus being promoted to the following year's Campeonato Brasileiro Série B.

==== Red Bull agreement ====
On 26 March 2019, Bragantino's president announced a partnership deal with Red Bull Brasil. Red Bull GmbH sought negotiations due to the team's failure to reach the Série A, preferring to partner with a different existing club. In April 2019, Bragantino signed a deal with Red Bull GmbH handling over management of all their football-related assets.

For the 2019 second division season the team was simply called Bragantino with Red Bull appearing only as a sponsor on the shirts. They were promoted to the Série A and qualified for the 2020 Copa do Brasil round of 16.

=== New club ===
From 2020 the name of Red Bull Bragantino was introduced. They changed the crest and its colours from its traditional black and white to red and white, de facto becoming a new club.

On 16 January 2023, Red Bull Brasil changed its name to Red Bull Bragantino II, becoming the B team of Red Bull Bragantino.

== Stadium ==
Bragantino's stadium is the Estádio Nabi Abi Chedid, built in 1949 with a maximum capacity of 21,209 people. The stadium, owned by the Clube Atlético Bragantino, honors Nabi Abi Chedid, a former president of the club and father of present president Marco Antônio Abi Chedid. It had previously been named the Estádio Marcelo Stéfani, in honor of Marcelo Stéfani, a player and former president of the club. As Estádio Marcelo Stéfani, the stadium was also known by the nickname Marcelão. The name change was effected on 6 January 2009 amidd criticism from the Bragança Paulista population.

== Club colors ==
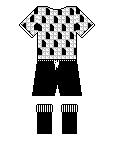
1989–1991 Bragantino's home kit

The uniform on the right was used by Bragantino during the 1989, 1990 and 1991 seasons. It was later replaced by a more traditional uniform, but returned in 2006.

== Ultras ==
- Torcida Uniformizada Guerreiros do Leão.

== Achievements ==
- Campeonato Brasileiro Série A:
  - Runners-up (1): 1991
- Campeonato Brasileiro Série B: 2

1989, 2019

- Campeonato Brasileiro Série C: 1

2007

- Campeonato Paulista: 1

1990

- Campeonato Paulista Série A2: 2

1965, 1988

- Campeonato Paulista Fifth Division: 1

1979

== Season records ==
As of 13 November 2022.

| Season | Div. | Pos. | Pl. | W | D | L | GS | GA | Pts. | Copa do Brasil | CONMEBOL |
|---|---|---|---|---|---|---|---|---|---|---|---|
| 2002 | Série B | 26 | 25 | 4 | 5 | 16 | 23 | 54 | 17 | First round | DNP |
| 2003 | Série C | 6 | 12 | 7 | 2 | 3 | 20 | 15 | 23 | DNP | DNP |
| 2004 | DNP | | | | | | | | | DNP | DNP |
| 2005 | DNP | | | | | | | | | DNP | DNP |
| 2006 | DNP | | | | | | | | | DNP | DNP |
| 2007 | Série C | 1 | 32 | 16 | 7 | 9 | 46 | 32 | 55 | DNP | DNP |
| 2008 | Série B | 7 | 38 | 16 | 9 | 13 | 47 | 41 | 57 | Second round | DNP |
| 2009 | Série B | 9 | 38 | 15 | 8 | 15 | 52 | 51 | 53 | DNP | DNP |
| 2010 | Série B | 8 | 38 | 13 | 14 | 11 | 52 | 37 | 53 | DNP | DNP |
| 2011 | Série B | 6 | 38 | 16 | 10 | 12 | 65 | 53 | 58 | DNP | DNP |
| 2012 | Série B | 14 | 38 | 12 | 8 | 18 | 45 | 53 | 44 | DNP | DNP |
| 2013 | Série B | 16 | 38 | 13 | 8 | 17 | 37 | 43 | 47 | Second round | DNP |
| 2014 | Série B | 16 | 38 | 13 | 7 | 18 | 45 | 55 | 46 | Round of 16 | DNP |
| 2015 | Série B | 6 | 38 | 19 | 3 | 16 | 56 | 66 | 60 | Second round | DNP |
| 2016 | Série B | 19 | 38 | 8 | 8 | 22 | 30 | 54 | 32 | Third round | DNP |
| 2017 | Série C | 7 | 18 | 4 | 9 | 5 | 16 | 19 | 21 | Second round | DNP |
| 2018 | Série C | 4 | 22 | 9 | 8 | 5 | 25 | 18 | 35 | Third round | DNP |
| 2019 | Série B | 1 | 38 | 22 | 9 | 7 | 64 | 27 | 78 | DNP | DNP |

== Notable players ==
- (Brazil) Oswaldo Taurisano
- (Brazil) Mazinho
- (Brazil) Gil Baiano
- (Brazil) Mauro Silva
- (Brazil) Paulinho

== Famous coaches ==
- (Brazil) Vanderlei Luxemburgo (1989–90)
- (Brazil) Carlos Alberto Parreira (1991)
- (Brazil) Marcelo Veiga (2004–05), (2006–07), (2007–12), (2013–14)

== Last squad ==
=== First team ===
As of 30 October 2019

Note: Flags indicate national team as defined under FIFA eligibility rules; some limited exceptions apply. Players may hold more than one non-FIFA nationality.

| No. | Pos. | Nation | Player |
|---|---|---|---|
| 1 | GK | BRA | Júlio César |
| 3 | DF | BRA | Léo Ortiz |
| 4 | DF | BRA | Ligger |
| 5 | MF | BRA | Barreto |
| 8 | MF | BRA | Uillian Correia |
| 9 | FW | BRA | Matheus Peixoto |
| 13 | DF | BRA | Aderlan (on loan from Santa Rita) |
| 15 | FW | BRA | Ytalo |
| 17 | DF | BRA | Rayne (on loan from Red Bull Brasil) |
| 19 | MF | BRA | Pedro Naressi |
| 20 | MF | BRA | Bruno Tubarão |
| 27 | FW | BRA | Wesley |
| 28 | FW | BRA | Robinho |
| 31 | MF | BRA | Vitinho (on loan from Palmeiras) |

| No. | Pos. | Nation | Player |
|---|---|---|---|
| 32 | GK | BRA | Alex Alves |
| 36 | DF | BRA | Edimar |
| 37 | MF | BRA | Ricardo Ryller (on loan from Braga) |
| 38 | FW | BRA | Morato |
| 39 | FW | BRA | Claudinho |
| — | GK | BRA | Jordan (on loan from Red Bull Brasil) |
| — | DF | BRA | Jhonatan (on loan from Red Bull Brasil) |
| — | DF | ECU | Leonardo Realpe |
| — | DF | BRA | Luan Cândido (on loan from RB Leipzig) |
| — | MF | BRA | Cristiano (on loan from Red Bull Brasil) |
| — | MF | BRA | Matheus Jesus (on loan from Corinthians) |
| — | MF | BRA | Thonny Anderson |
| — | FW | BRA | Alerrandro |
| — | FW | BRA | Artur |

== Copa CONMEBOL participations ==
=== 1992 Edition ===
First Round

| Team 1 | Agg. | Team 2 | 1st leg | 2nd leg |
|---|---|---|---|---|
| Bragantino (Brazil) | 3–3 | (Brazil) Grêmio | 2–2 | 1–1 (6–7p) |

=== 1993 edition ===
First Round

| Team 1 | Agg. | Team 2 | 1st leg | 2nd leg |
|---|---|---|---|---|
| Botafogo (Brazil) | 6–3 | (Brazil) Bragantino | 3–1 | 3–2 |

=== 1996 edition ===
First Round

| Team 1 | Agg. | Team 2 | 1st leg | 2nd leg |
|---|---|---|---|---|
| Bragantino (Brazil) | 5–4 | (Brazil) Palmeiras | 5–1 | 0–3 |

Second Round

| Team 1 | Agg. | Team 2 | 1st leg | 2nd leg |
|---|---|---|---|---|
| Independiente Santa Fé (Colombia) | 1–0 | (Brazil) Bragantino | 1–0 | 0–0 |
