= Matheus Neris =

Brazilian footballer

Personal information
- Full name: Matheus Neris Graça
- Date of birth: 12 February 1999 (age 27)
- Place of birth: Osasco, Brazil
- Height: 1.80 m (5 ft 11 in)
- Position: Midfielder

Youth career
- 2015–2016: São Paulo

Senior career*
Years	Team	Apps	(Gls)
2019–2021	Palmeiras	0	(0)
2019	→ Londrina (loan)	12	(0)
2020	→ Inter de Limeira (loan)	10	(0)
2020–2021	→ Figueirense (loan)	26	(2)
2021–2022	Cruzeiro	12	(0)
- * Club domestic league appearances and goals as of 11 August 2021

Matheus Neris Graça (born 12 February 1999) is a Brazilian footballer who currently plays as a midfielder.

== Career statistics ==
=== Club ===
As of 13 May 2020.

Club	Season	League			State League		Cup		Continental		Other		Total	
Club	Season	Division	Apps	Goals	Apps	Goals	Apps	Goals	Apps	Goals	Apps	Goals	Apps	Goals
Palmeiras	2019	Série A	0	0	0	0	0	0	–		0	0	0	0
Palmeiras	2020	Série A	0	0	0	0	0	0	–		0	0	0	0
Palmeiras	Total		0	0	0	0	0	0	0	0	0	0	0	0
Londrina (loan)	2019	Série B	12	0	0	0	0	0	–		0	0	12	0
Inter de Limeira (loan)	2020	–			6 (Note: Appearances in the Campeonato Paulista)	0	0	0	–		0	0	6	0
Career total			12	0	6	0	0	0	0	0	0	0	18	0
