= Rayne (footballer) =

Brazilian footballer (born 1997)

Personal information
- Full name: Rayne Pinto de Assis
- Date of birth: 17 January 1997 (age 29)
- Place of birth: Vitória, Brazil
- Height: 1.98 m (6 ft 6 in)
- Position: Centre back

Team information
- Current team: Inter de Limeira

Youth career
- 2012: Grêmio Prudente
- 2013: Grêmio
- 2014–2016: Red Bull Brasil

Senior career*
Years	Team	Apps	(Gls)
2016–2019	Red Bull Brasil	27	(0)
2016	→ São José dos Campos FC (loan)	8	(1)
2017	→ Grêmio Prudente (loan)	0	(0)
2019–2020	Red Bull Bragantino	3	(0)
2020	→ Red Bull Brasil (loan)	10	(0)
2021	Ferroviária	0	(0)
2021–2023	Figueirense	16	(0)
2022	→ Paraná (loan)	8	(0)
2022	→ Manaus (loan)	16	(0)
2023	→ Resende (loan)	11	(1)
2023–	Inter de Limeira	1	(0)
- * Club domestic league appearances and goals as of 6 August 2023

Rayne Pinto de Assis (born 17 January 1997), known as Rayne, is a Brazilian footballer who plays as a central defender for Inter de Limeira.

== Career statistics ==
As of 6 June 2021

Club	Season	League			State League		Cup		Continental		Other		Total	
Club	Season	Division	Apps	Goals	Apps	Goals	Apps	Goals	Apps	Goals	Apps	Goals	Apps	Goals
São José dos Campos FC (loan)	2016	Paulista A3	—		8	1	—		—		—		8	1
Grêmio Prudente (loan)	2017	Paulista Segunda Divisão	—		0	0	—		—		—		0	0
Red Bull Brasil	2018	Paulista A1	—		5	0	—		—		11 (Note: Appearance(s) in Copa Paulista)	0	16	0
Red Bull Brasil	2019	Paulista A1	—		1	0	—		—		—		1	0
Red Bull Brasil	Total		—		6	0	—		—		—		17	0
Red Bull Bragantino	2019	Série B	3	0	—		—		—		—		3	0
Red Bull Brasil (loan)	2020	Paulista A2	—		10	0	—		—		—		10	0
Ferroviária	2021	Paulista A1	—		0	0	—		—		—		0	0
Figueirense	2021	Série C	1	0	—		—		—		—		1	0
Career total			4	0	24	1	0	0	0	0	11	0	39	1

== Honours ==
Red Bull Bragantino

- Campeonato Brasileiro Série B: 2019

== Notes and references ==
Notes
