= Agremiação Sportiva Arapiraquense =

Association football club in Brazil

ASA de Arapiraca
- Full name: Agremiação Sportiva Arapiraquense
- Nicknames: Fantasma (Ghost); Gigante (Giant); Alvinegro (Black and White)
- Founded: 25 September 1952; 74 years ago
- Ground: Estádio Coaracy da Mata Fonseca
- Capacity: 15,332
- President: Celso Marcos
- Head coach: Léo Goiano
- League: Campeonato Brasileiro Série D Campeonato Alagoano
- 2025 2025: Série D, 5th of 64; Alagoano, 2nd of 8
- Website: www.asa-arapiraca.com.br
Home colours	Away colours

Agremiação Sportiva Arapiraquense, commonly referred to as ASA de Arapiraca or ASA, is a Brazilian professional football club based in Arapiraca, Alagoas. It competes in the Série D, the fourth tier of Brazilian football, as well as in the Campeonato Alagoano, the top flight of the Alagoas state football league.

== History ==
Arapiraca was led by Mayor Dr. Coaracy da Mata Fonseca, and despite its small size, the city was on the cusp of progress. The local fair was already distinguishing itself throughout the Brazilian Northeast. The construction of the railway by the Camilo Colier company required the labor of many workers, who sought leisure activities on their days off. In response to employee requests, the company's management built a soccer field. The team formed took the name Ferroviário, with black and white as its colors. Sundays became busier as residents flocked to the field. However, with the completion of the railway, the team disbanded and the Sunday afternoons lost their recreational outlet.

Businessmen and city officials were not content with the void caused by the lack of football. After several discussions, on 25 September 1952, the Associação Sportiva de Arapiraca, was the ASA that emerged from the entrepreneurial force of Mr. Antônio Pereira Rocha, the first president. In 1977, the club began to be called Agremiação Sportiva Arapiraquense, remaining the same ASA.

The club is the third largest state champion in Alagoas, with 7 titles. In the national scenario, the club was runner-up of Campeonato Brasileiro Série C after losing to América Mineiro in 2009. In 2013, reached the final of the Copa do Nordeste, but was defeated to Campinense.

In 2002, ASA gained prominence by eliminating Palmeiras still in the first round of Copa do Brasil.

== Symbols ==
=== Crest ===
The emblem has as its base structure three concentric circles (representing the union of the crowd), with the motto - Agremiação Sportiva Arapiraquense, in the core of the shield, the sinister, an oval geometric figure representing a leaf of bipartisan (smoke green) and white (mature smoke) and in this, the name ASA. On the right, suggesting a line where the smoke is exposed to the sun for its drying in the field, having in the central part, symbolizing Arapiraca, the "radiant star", an integral part of the hymn of the municipality, by the poet and educator Pedro de França Reis.

=== Nicknames ===
The club finished as runner-up in the Campeonato Alagoano in 1967 and 1970, and began touring the Northeast Region of Brazil. ASA, then little known outside Alagoas, won a number of these matches with Acebílio as its leading player. The nickname "Phantom of Alagoas" (Fantasma das Alagoas) dates from this period.

== Stadium ==
ASA's home matches are usually played at Fumeirão, which has a maximum capacity of 17,000 people.

== Current squad ==
As of 1 October 2026

Note: Flags indicate national team as defined under FIFA eligibility rules; some limited exceptions apply. Players may hold more than one non-FIFA nationality.

No.	Pos.	Nation	Player
—	GK	BRA	Dida
—	GK	BRA	Renato
—	GK	BRA	João Paulo
—	DF	BRA	Fábio Aguiar
—	DF	BRA	Roni Lobo
—	DF	BRA	Mattheus Silva
—	DF	BRA	Ailton
—	DF	BRA	Arthurzinho
—	DF	BRA	Léo Príncipe
—	DF	BRA	Jan Pieter
—	DF	BRA	Paulinho
—	DF	BRA	Jackson
—	MF	BRA	Allef
—	MF	BRA	Natan Nunes
—	MF	BRA	Léo Bahia

No.	Pos.	Nation	Player
—	MF	BRA	Ferreira
—	MF	BRA	Sammuel
—	MF	BRA	Jailson
—	MF	BRA	Higor Leite
—	MF	PAR	Richard Franco
—	MF	BRA	Ytallo Lima
—	MF	BRA	Yohan Miranda
—	MF	BRA	Pedro Colina
—	FW	BRA	Gustavo Ramos
—	FW	BRA	Jonata
—	FW	BRA	Mbappé da Shopee
—	FW	BRA	Marquinhos Brazion
—	FW	BRA	Michel Douglas
—	FW	BRA	Wandson

== Honours ==
=== Official tournaments ===
Inter-state
Competitions	Titles	Seasons
Copa Alagipe	1	2005
State
Competitions	Titles	Seasons
Campeonato Alagoano	7	1953, 2000, 2001, 2003, 2005, 2009, 2011
Copa Alagoas	3	2015, 2020, 2021

- record

=== Others tournaments ===
==== State ====
- Copa Maceió (1): 2005
- Campeonato do Interior (1): 1953

=== Runners-up ===
- Campeonato Brasileiro Série C (1): 2009
- Campeonato Brasileiro Série D (1): 2026
- Copa do Nordeste (1): 2013
- Campeonato Alagoano (13): 1957, 1967, 1970, 1979, 1991, 2008, 2010, 2012, 2022, 2023, 2024, 2025, 2026
- Copa Alagoas (2): 2005, 2023
