= Diego Ferreira (footballer, born 1996) =

Brazilian footballer

Personal information
- Full name: Diego Ferreira Matheus
- Date of birth: 26 February 1996 (age 30)
- Place of birth: Niterói, Brazil
- Height: 1.73 m (5 ft 8 in)
- Position: Right back

Team information
- Current team: Náutico

Youth career
- 2008–2015: Botafogo

Senior career*
Years	Team	Apps	(Gls)
2015–2017	Botafogo	24	(0)
2017	→ Chiapas (loan)	3	(0)
2017–	Tombense	28	(0)
2017–2018	→ Atlético Paranaense (loan)	18	(0)
2019	→ Fortaleza (loan)	2	(0)
2019–2021	→ América Mineiro (loan)	82	(3)
2023–	→ Náutico (loan)	22	(0)
- * Club domestic league appearances and goals as of 26 August 2023

Diego Ferreira Matheus (born 26 February 1996), known as Diego Ferreira, is a Brazilian footballer who plays as a right back for Náutico on loan from Tombense.

== Club career ==
Born in Niterói, Rio de Janeiro, Diego represented Botafogo as a youth. He made his senior debut on 30 April 2015, starting in a 2–1 Copa do Brasil away win against Capivariano; he also provided the assist for Sassá's goal.

On 21 December 2015, after contributing with seven Série B matches, Diego renewed his contract until the end of 2018. He made his Série A debut the following 2 June, starting in a 1–0 home loss against Cruzeiro.

On 18 January 2017, after being rarely used, Diego was loaned to Chiapas. In November, he moved to Atlético Paranaense on loan from Tombense, being initially assigned to the under-23 squad. He was loaned again, to Fortaleza on 21 December 2018, on a one-year contract. After playing just two matches with Fortaleza, his loan contract was cancelled in favour of another loan deal with América Mineiro.

== Honours ==
Botafogo

- Campeonato Brasileiro Série B: 2015

Athletico PR

- Campeonato Paranaense: 2018
- Copa Sul-americana: 2018

Fortaleza

- Copa do Nordeste: 2019
