= Léo Castro =

Brazilian footballer (born 1994)

Personal information
- Full name: Leonardo Luiz e Castro
- Date of birth: 13 July 1994 (age 32)
- Place of birth: São Paulo, Brazil
- Height: 1.78 m (5 ft 10 in)
- Position: Forward

Youth career
- 2011: Portuguesa
- 2011–2014: Coritiba

Senior career*
Years	Team	Apps	(Gls)
2015	Grêmio Barueri	1	(0)
2015	União Barbarense	0	(0)
2016	Santa Rita	1	(0)
2016	Inter de Lages	8	(0)
2017	Nacional–SP	24	(11)
2017–2021	Ferroviária	36	(6)
2017	→ Oeste (loan)	5	(1)
2018–2019	→ Red Bull Brasil (loan)	5	(0)
2020	→ Juventus-SP (loan)	12	(9)
2020	→ Paraná (loan)	16	(1)
2021	→ São Bernardo (loan)	21	(5)
2021	→ Portuguesa (loan)	0	(0)
2022	Portuguesa	12	(2)
2023	Velo Clube	15	(4)
2023	Marília	0	(0)
2024	Juventus-SP	16	(7)
2024	North	7	(1)
2024	Água Santa	2	(0)
2025	Juventus-SP	1	(0)
- * Club domestic league appearances and goals

Leonardo "Léo" Luiz e Castro (born 13 July 1994) is a Brazilian retired footballer who played as a forward.

== Career ==
=== Grêmio Barueri ===
Léo made his debut for Grêmio Barueri against Sertãozinho on 25 February 2015.

=== União Barbarense ===
Léo made his debut in the Copa Paulista for União Barbarense against Rio Branco EC on 18 July 2015. He scored his first goal against XV de Piracicaba on 8 August 2015, scoring in the 73rd minute.

=== Santa Rita ===
Léo made his debut for Santa Rita against Sete de Setembro - AL on 24 January 2016.

=== Inter de Lages ===
Léo made his debut for Inter de Lages against Linense on 12 June 2016.

=== Nacional SP ===
Léo scored on his debut for Nacional SP against Rio Branco EC on 28 January 2017, scoring in the 76th minute.

=== Ferroviária ===
Léo scored on his debut for Ferroviária against Mirassol on 2 July 2017, scoring in the 60th minute.

=== Oeste ===
Léo made his debut for Oeste against CRB on 14 April 2018. He scored his first goal for the club against Atlético Goianiense on 25 May 2018, scoring in the 81st minute.

=== Red Bull Brasil ===
Léo scored on his debut for Red Bull Brasil against XV de Piracicaba on 4 August 2018, scoring in the 59th minute.

=== Juventus-SP ===
Léo scored on his debut for Juventus-SP against Votuporanguense on 22 January 2020, scoring in the 43rd and 90th+3rd minute.

=== Paraná ===
Léo made his debut for Paraná against CRB on 15 September 2020. He scored his first goal for the club against Confiança on 7 November 2020, scoring in the 57th minute.

=== São Bernardo ===
Léo made his debut for São Bernardo against Rio Claro on 28 February 2021. He scored his first goal for the club against Juventus-SP on 23 April 2021, scoring in the 71st minute.

=== Loan to Portuguesa ===
Léo scored on his debut for Portuguesa against Votuporanguense on 23 October 2021, scoring in the 10th and 60th minute.

=== Portuguesa ===
Léo made his league debut for Portuguesa against Primavera SP on 27 January 2022. He scored his first goal for the club against Taubaté on 10 March 2022, scoring in the 76th minute.

=== Velo Clube ===
Léo made his debut for Velo against Ponte Preta on 14 January 2023. He scored his first goal for the club against EC Lemense on 18 January 2023, scoring a penalty in the 36th minute.

=== Marília ===
Léo made his debut for Marília against Comercial on 5 July 2023. He scored his first goal for the club against São José EC on 10 September 2023, scoring in the 73rd minute.

=== Second spell at Juventus-SP ===
Léo made his debut for Juventus-SP against São Bento on 17 January 2024. He scored his first goal for the club against Taubaté on 25 February 2024, scoring in the 8th minute.

== Career statistics ==
As of match played 6 March 2026

Appearances and goals by club, season and competition
Club	Season	League			State League		Cup		Continental		Other		Total	
Club	Season	Division	Apps	Goals	Apps	Goals	Apps	Goals	Apps	Goals	Apps	Goals	Apps	Goals
Grêmio Barueri	2015	Paulista A3	—		1	0	—		—		—		1	0
Grêmio Barueri	Total		—		1	0	—		—		—		1	0
União Barbarense	2015	Paulista A2	—		—		—		—		15 (Note: All appearance(s) in Copa Paulista)	3	15	3
União Barbarense	Total		—		—		—		—		15	3	15	3
Santa Rita	2016	Alagoano	—		1	0	—		—		—		1	0
Santa Rita	Total		—		1	0	—		—		—		1	0
Inter de Lages	2016	Série D	8	0	—		—		—		—		8	0
Inter de Lages	Total		8	0	—		—		—		—		8	0
Nacional–SP	2017	Paulista A3	—		24	11	—		—		—		24	11
Nacional–SP	Total		—		24	11	—		—		—		24	11
Ferroviária (loan)	2017	Paulista	—		—		—		—		24	14	24	14
Ferroviária (loan)	2018	Série D	—		13	3	—		—		—		13	3
Ferroviária (loan)	Total		—		13	3	—		—		24	14	37	17
Osasco Sporting (loan)	2018	Série B	5	1	—		—		—		—		5	1
Osasco Sporting (loan)	Total		5	1	—		—		—		—		5	1
Red Bull Bragantino II (loan)	2018	Copa Paulista	—		—		—		—		20	11	20	11
Red Bull Bragantino II (loan)	2019	Paulista	—		5	0	—		—		—		5	0
Red Bull Bragantino II (loan)	Total		—		5	0	—		—		20	11	25	11
Ferroviária-SP	2019	Série D	8	1	—		—		—		5	0	13	1
Ferroviária-SP	Total		8	1	—		—		—		5	0	13	1
Juventus-SP (loan)	2020	Paulista A2	—		12	9	—		—		—		12	9
Juventus-SP (loan)	Total		—		12	9	—		—		—		12	9
Ferroviária-SP	2020	Paulista	—		—		1	0	—		—		1	0
Ferroviária-SP	Total		—		—		1	0	—		—		1	0
Paraná Clube (loan)	2020	Série B	16	1	—		—		—		—		16	1
Paraná Clube (loan)	Total		16	1	—		—		—		—		16	1
São Bernardo (loan)	2021	Paulista A2	—		21	5	—		—		—		21	5
São Bernardo (loan)	Total		—		21	5	—		—		—		21	5
Ferroviária-SP	2021	Série D	15	2	—		—		—		—		15	2
Ferroviária-SP	Total		15	2	—		—		—		—		15	2
Portuguesa (loan)	2021	Série D	—		—		—		—		4	3	4	3
Portuguesa (loan)	2022	Paulista A2	—		12	2	—		—		6	0	18	2
Portuguesa (loan)	Total		—		12	2	—		—		10	3	22	5
Velo Clube	2023	Paulista A2	—		15	4	—		—		—		15	4
Velo Clube	Total		—		15	4	—		—		—		15	4
Marília	2023	Paulista A3	—		—		—		—		11	1	11	1
Marília	Total		—		—		—		—		11	1	11	1
Juventus-SP	2024	Paulista A2	—		16	7	—		—		—		16	7
Juventus-SP	Total		—		16	7	—		—		—		16	7
North-MG	2024	Paulista A2	—		7	1	—		—		—		7	1
North-MG	Total		—		7	1	—		—		—		7	1
Água Santa	2024	Série D	2	0	—		—		—		—		2	0
Água Santa	Total		2	0	—		—		—		—		2	0
Juventus-SP	2025	Paulista A2	—		1	0	—		—		—		1	0
Juventus-SP	Total		—		1	0	—		—		—		1	0
Career total			54	5	128	42	1	0	0	0	85	32	268	79

== Honours ==
Nacional–SP

- Campeonato Paulista Série A3: 2017

Ferroviária-SP

- Copa Paulista: 2017

São Bernando

- Campeonato Paulista Série A2: 2021

Portuguesa

- Campeonato Paulista Série A2: 2022
