= Cesinha (footballer, born 1996) =

Brazilian footballer

- Cesinha with São Bernardo in 2022

Personal information
- Full name: Mário César Belli
- Date of birth: 20 March 1996 (age 30)
- Place of birth: Pedreira, Brazil
- Height: 1.76 m (5 ft 9 in)
- Position: Defensive midfielder

Team information
- Current team: Portuguesa
- Number: 8

Youth career
- 2011–2012: São Judas Tadeu
- 2013–2015: Inter de Limeira

Senior career*
Years	Team	Apps	(Gls)
2014–2016	Inter de Limeira	9	(0)
2017–2018	Rio Branco-SP	35	(0)
2018–2020	Comercial-SP	61	(5)
2021	Rio Claro	53	(17)
2021–2022	→ São Bernardo (loan)	16	(0)
2023–2024	→ Maringá (loan)	13	(0)
2024	→ Inter de Limeira (loan)	19	(2)
2025–2026	→ Água Santa (loan)	31	(5)
2026	Água Santa	6	(0)
2027–	Portuguesa	0	(0)
- * Club domestic league appearances and goals as of 21:58, 8 November 2026 (UTC)

Mário César Belli (born 20 March 1996), commonly known as Cesinha, is a Brazilian professional footballer who plays as a defensive midfielder for Portuguesa.

== Career ==
Born in Pedreira, São Paulo, Cesinha played for São Judas Tadeu and Inter de Limeira as a youth before making his first team debut with the latter in 2014. Rarely used in the following years, he left for Rio Branco-SP ahead of the 2017 season.

Cesinha playing for São Bernardo in the 2021 Copa Paulista final

In March 2018, Cesinha moved to Comercial-SP, and helped the club to achieve promotion from the Campeonato Paulista Segunda Divisão in that year. In January 2021, he joined Rio Claro. He scored seven goals in the year's Campeonato Paulista Série A2, being the top scorer of the competition, and signed for São Bernardo on loan on 21 July.

Cesinha returned to Rio Claro ahead of the 2023 campaign, before being loaned out to Maringá on 22 April of that year. His loan was cut short the following February, and he gained widespread notoriety on 2 March 2024, by scoring a goal from beyond the midfield line against Juventus, at Rua Javari, being speculated to be in contention for the FIFA Puskas Award.

On 3 April 2024, Cesinha returned to his first club Inter de Limeira for the 2024 Série D, also on loan. He returned to Rio Claro in December, and but was later loaned to Água Santa on 16 April 2025.

In April 2026, Cesinha signed a permanent contract with Água Santa until November 2027. On 7 July, he agreed to a loan deal with Ponte Preta in the Série B until the end of the season, but the deal fell through roughly one month later, due to the club's transfer ban.

On 10 November 2026, Cesinha was announced at Portuguesa on a one-year deal.

== Career statistics ==
As of 8 November 2026

Club	Season	League			State League		Cup		Continental		Other		Total	
Club	Season	Division	Apps	Goals	Apps	Goals	Apps	Goals	Apps	Goals	Apps	Goals	Apps	Goals
Inter de Limeira	2014	Paulista A3	—		2	0	—		—		12 (Note: Appearance(s) in Copa Paulista)	0	14	0
Inter de Limeira	2015	Paulista A3	—		4	0	—		—		—		4	0
Inter de Limeira	2016	Paulista A3	—		3	0	—		—		—		3	0
Inter de Limeira	Total		—		9	0	—		—		12	0	21	0
Rio Branco-SP	2017	Paulista A3	—		20	0	—		—		12	0	32	0
Rio Branco-SP	2018	Paulista A3	—		15	0	—		—		—		15	0
Rio Branco-SP	Total		—		35	0	—		—		12	0	47	0
Comercial-SP	2018	Paulista 2ª Divisão	—		29	3	—		—		—		29	3
Comercial-SP	2019	Paulista A3	—		14	0	—		—		14	0	28	0
Comercial-SP	2020	Paulista A3	—		18	2	—		—		9	0	27	2
Comercial-SP	Total		—		61	5	—		—		23	0	84	5
Rio Claro	2021	Paulista A2	—		19	7	—		—		—		19	7
Rio Claro	2023	Paulista A2	—		15	4	—		—		—		15	4
Rio Claro	2024	Paulista A2	—		6	2	—		—		—		6	2
Rio Claro	2025	Paulista A2	—		13	4	—		—		—		13	4
Rio Claro	Total		—		53	17	—		—		—		53	17
São Bernardo (loan)	2021	Paulista A2	—		—		—		—		11	0	11	0
São Bernardo (loan)	2022	Série D	12	0	4	0	—		—		—		16	0
São Bernardo (loan)	Total		12	0	4	0	—		—		11	0	27	0
Maringá (loan)	2023	Série D	11	0	—		1	0	—		—		12	0
Maringá (loan)	2024	Série D	—		2	0	—		—		—		2	0
Maringá (loan)	Total		11	0	2	0	1	0	—		—		14	0
Inter de Limeira (loan)	2024	Série D	19	2	—		—		—		—		19	2
Água Santa	2025	Série D	14	1	—		—		—		—		14	1
Água Santa	2026	Série D	7	1	16	2	—		—		—		23	3
Água Santa	Total		21	2	16	2	—		—		—		37	4
Portuguesa (loan)	2027	Série D	0	0	0	0	0	0	—		—		0	0
Career total			63	4	180	24	1	0	0	0	58	0	302	28

== Honours ==
São Bernardo

- Copa Paulista: 2021

Individual

- Campeonato Paulista Série A2 top scorer: 2021 (7 goals)
