= Arena Capivari =

Soccer stadium in Capivari, São Paulo, Brazil

- Interactive map of Arena Capivari
- Full name: Estádio Municipal Carlos Colnaghi
- Location: Rua Aracajú, s/n, Capivari, SP, Brazil
- Coordinates: 22.993523357152498°S 47.514410042327306°W
- Owner: City of Capivari
- Operator: Capivariano
- Capacity: 14,651 (official); 7,314 (CBF)
- Surface: Natural grass
- Field size: 105 by 68 metres (114.8 yd × 74.4 yd)

Construction
- Opened: 30 December 1992
- Renovated: 2014–2015, 2025

Tenant
- Capivariano

Estádio Municipal Carlos Colnaghi, sometimes known as Arena Capivari, is a multi-use stadium in Capivari, São Paulo, Brazil. It is used mostly for football matches, and has a capacity of 14,651 people.

== History ==
Capivariano played their home matches at the Estádio Fernando de Marco, until the inauguration of Estádio Carlos Colnaghi in December 1992. In July 2014, after the club achieved a first-ever promotion to the Campeonato Paulista, the stadium was renovated to comply with the requirements of the Federação Paulista de Futebol.

The renovations concluded in January 2015, with the stadium being nicknamed Arena Capivari. In December 2019, the stadium was closed due to the risk of collapse, and was only reopened in January 2023.

In 2025, after another promotion to the top tier of the São Paulo state league, another renovation took place as the Arena Capivari received a new draining system and new grass.
