= Andrey Quintino =

Brazilian footballer (born 2002)

Personal information
- Full name: Andrey Rafael Quintino dos Santos
- Date of birth: 5 August 2002 (age 24)
- Place of birth: Santos, Brazil
- Height: 1.76 m (5 ft 9 in)
- Position: Winger

Team information
- Current team: Confiança (on loan from Santos)

Youth career
- 2013: Sumaré
- 2014–2016: Ponte Preta
- 2017–2022: Santos

Senior career*
Years	Team	Apps	(Gls)
2023–	Santos	0	(0)
2023	→ Ituano (loan)	3	(0)
2023	→ XV de Piracicaba (loan)	13	(0)
2024	→ Juventus-SP (loan)	2	(0)
2024	→ Inter de Limeira (loan)	0	(0)
2026–	→ Confiança (loan)	13	(1)
- * Club domestic league appearances and goals as of 15:36, 19 May 2026 (UTC)

Andrey Rafael Quintino dos Santos (born 5 August 2002), known as Andrey Quintino, is a Brazilian footballer who plays for Confiança, on loan from Santos. Mainly a winger, he can also play as a right back.

== Club career ==
Born in Santos, São Paulo, Quintino joined Santos' youth setup in 2017, after representing Ponte Preta and Sumaré. On 29 August 2019, he signed his first professional contract with the club.

Quintino impressed Santos' first team manager Cuca during an under-20 match in 2020, where he played as a right back, but did not manage to feature in a first-team match due to injuries. He further extended his contract with Peixe on 23 December of that year, and subsequently continued to appear with the under-20s.

On 10 January 2023, Quintino was loaned to Série B side Ituano until 3 July, being presented at his new club the following day. He made his professional debut fifteen days later, coming on as a second-half substitute for Eduardo Person in a 3–1 Campeonato Paulista home loss against Palmeiras.

On 27 March 2023, Quintino returned to Santos after just three matches for Ituano. On 5 May, he was presented at XV de Piracicaba.

On 19 March 2024, Quintino's contract with Santos was extended for a further year, and moved on loan to Juventus-SP for the remainder of the Campeonato Paulista Série A2 two days later. On 23 April, he moved to Inter de Limeira in the fourth division also in a temporary deal.

Back to Santos in September 2024 after making no appearances for Inter, Quintino took part of first team trainings in the following month. Separated from the first team again in the beginning of the 2025 season, he was brought back to trainings by head coach Cleber Xavier, and signed a new deal until December on 10 June 2025.

Despite spending another year without any appearances, Quintino's contract was again renewed for a further year on 28 December 2025, and he was immediately loaned to Confiança. He scored his first professional goal the following 28 February, netting his side's second in a 2–0 Campeonato Sergipano away win over Itabaiana.

== Personal life ==
Quintino is the son of Ademir Quintino, a journalist who covers Santos.

== Career statistics ==
As of 19 May 2026

Club	Season	League			State League		Cup		Continental		Other		Total	
Club	Season	Division	Apps	Goals	Apps	Goals	Apps	Goals	Apps	Goals	Apps	Goals	Apps	Goals
Ituano	2023	Série B	0	0	3	0	0	0	—		—		3	0
XV de Piracicaba	2023	Série D	13	0	—		—		—		9 (Note: Appearance(s) in Copa Paulista)	0	22	0
Juventus-SP	2024	Paulista A2	—		2	0	—		—		—		2	0
Inter de Limeira	2024	Série D	0	0	—		—		—		—		0	0
Confiança	2026	Série C	3	0	10	1	2	1	—		4 (Note: Appearance(s) in Copa do Nordeste)	0	19	2
Career total			16	0	13	1	2	1	0	0	13	0	44	2
