= ABD Futebol Clube =

ABD FC
- Full name: ABD Futebol Clube
- Founded: November 20, 1971
- Ground: Estádio Antônio Genoveva, Santo Antônio de Goiás, Goiás state, Brazil
- President: (Brazil) Jane Vitorino dos Santos Sousa
- Head Coach: (Brazil) Everton Goiano
Home colours	Away colours

ABD Futebol Clube is a Brazilian football club of the city of Santo Antônio de Goiás, in the state of Goiás.

== History ==
Founded on November 20, 1971, The professional championships disputed by ABD were:

- Campeonato Goiano Third Division: 2021.

The team was managed by Everton Goiano.

== Stadium ==
The matches of ABD Futebol Clube are held at the Estádio Antônio Genoveva belonging to the Municipal Government.

== Players ==
=== Squad 2021 ===
As of 24 October 2021. Source: FGF

Note: Flags indicate national team as defined under FIFA eligibility rules; some limited exceptions apply. Players may hold more than one non-FIFA nationality.

No.	Pos.	Nation	Player
1	GK	BRA	Saulo Araujo Fontes
2	RB	BRA	Felipe Tavares Pires
3	DF	BRA	Luiz Henrique Amaral
4	DF	BRA	Marcos Luiz Alves
5	DF	BRA	Reuber Gonçalves
6	LB	BRA	Guilherme Rodrigues
8	MF	BRA	Renato Alves
9	FW	BRA	Marcus Vinicius Silva
10	FW	BRA	Marco Goiano
11	FW	BRA	Thiago Rubim
14	MF	BRA	Jose Vitor Silva Neves

No.	Pos.	Nation	Player
12	GK	BRA	Andre Ferreira Coelho
7	FW	BRA	Taylor Yago Silva
13	RB	BRA	Yago Ramon Souza
15	DF	BRA	Matheus Junio de Brito
16	MF	BRA	Rodrigo Souza Rocha
17	LB	BRA	Leonardo Mayco dos Santos
18	FW	BRA	Jair Filho
