= Cesinha (footballer, born 1981) =

Brazilian footballer

Personal information
- Full name: Luiz Cesar Barbieri
- Date of birth: 11 July 1981 (age 45)
- Place of birth: São Paulo, Brazil
- Height: 1.77 m (5 ft 10 in)
- Position: Forward

Youth career
- 2002–2002: Portuguesa

Senior career*
Years	Team	Apps	(Gls)
2003–2004	Taquaritinga		
2004–2004	Nacional (SP)		
2004–2004	São Paulo [U23]		
2005–2005	Nacional (SP)		
2005–2005	Grêmio Esportivo Juventus		
2006–2007	Nacional (SP)		
2007–2007	Brusque		
2007–2009	G.D. Estoril Praia	33	(4)
2009–2010	Gil Vicente FC	23	(7)
2010–2011	Esposende		
2011–2012	Operário	5	(0)
2012–2014	Windsor Arch Ka I	17	(13)
2012–2012	→ Olympiakos Nicosia (loan)	4	(0)
2014–?	Barreirense		
- * Club domestic league appearances and goals

Luiz Cesar Barbieri (born 11 July 1981 in São Paulo, Brazil), known as Cesinha, is a professional football who played as a forward.

Cesinha became the Macau Footballer of the Year in 2012.
