= Elosport Capão Bonito =

Elosport
- Full name: Elosport Capão Bonito
- Nickname(s): Elo; Galo do Sul
- Founded: 10 May 1993; 31 years ago
- Ground: Estádio Dr. José Sidney da Cunha
- Capacity: 10,022
- 2020: Paulista Série A4, 31st of 35
Home colours	Away colours

Elosport Capão Bonito, or simply Elosport, is a Brazilian football team based in Capão Bonito, São Paulo. Founded in 1993, it played in Campeonato Paulista Segunda Divisão.

== History ==
The club was founded on 10 May 1993, and professionalized its football department in 1997, after joining the Federação Paulista de Futebol.

== Stadium ==
Elosport Capão Bonito play their home games at Estádio Doutor José Sidney Cunha. The stadium has a maximum capacity of 6,740 people.
