= Mooca =

Mooca may refer to:

- Subprefecture of Mooca, São Paulo
- Mooca (district of São Paulo)
- Bresser-Mooca (São Paulo Metro)
