= União Suzano Atlético Clube =

União Suzano
- Full name: União Suzano Atlético Clube
- Nickname(s): Javali das Palmeiras
- Founded: 25 January 1969; 56 years ago
- Ground: Francisco Marques Figueira
- Capacity: 3,445
- League: Campeonato Paulista Série A3
- 2024: Paulista Série A3, 10th of 16
Home colors	Away colors

União Suzano Atlético Clube, commonly referred to as União Suzano or simply Suzano, is a Brazilian football team based in Suzano, São Paulo. Founded in 1969, the team competes in Campeonato Paulista Série A3, the third tier of the São Paulo state football league.

The club was formerly known as Clube Atlético Paulista.

== History ==
The club was founded on 25 January 1969, as Clube Atlético Paulista in Palmeiras neighborhood. The club's football department was professionalized in 1983, and the club was renamed to União Suzano Atlético Clube in 1989. They competed several times in the Campeonato Paulista Segunda Divisão.

== Stadium ==
União Suzano Atlético Clube play their home games at Estádio Francisco Marques Figueira, nicknamed Suzanão. The stadium has a maximum capacity of 3,445 people.

== Rivalries ==
The main rival of União Suzano is ECUS with whom does O Clássico dos Gêmeos (English: The Twins' Classic)

== Honours ==
- Campeonato Paulista Série A4
  - Winners: 2021
