= Cesinha (footballer, born 1997) =

Brazilian footballer (born 1997)

Personal information
- Full name: César Rodrigues de Oliveira
- Date of birth: 28 February 1997 (age 29)
- Place of birth: São Paulo, Brazil
- Height: 1.66 m (5 ft 5 1/2 in)
- Position: Winger

Team information
- Current team: Villa Nova-MG

Youth career
- 2013-2016: União Suzano
- 2016: Juventus-SP

Senior career*
Years	Team	Apps	(Gls)
2016	→ Guaratinguetá (loan)	3	(0)
2017–2019	Juventus-SP	26	(3)
2019	Osasco Sporting	6	(0)
2020	→ Boa Esporte (loan)	14	(1)
2020–2021	→ EC Água Santa (loan)	8	(1)
2021–2022	Portuguesa	25	(2)
2023	Marcílio Dias	3	(0)
2023	Juventus-SP	9	(1)
2023	→ Betim (loan)	17	(1)
2024–2025	Juventus-SP	25	(0)
2025	URT	10	(2)
2025	Primavera	0	(0)
2026	URT	12	(1)
2026	Tombense	11	(3)
2026-	Villa Nova-MG	6	(1)
- * Club domestic league appearances and goals as of 13 August 2026

César Rodrigues de Oliveira (born 28 February 1997), better known as Cesinha, is a Brazilian professional footballer who plays as a Winger for Villa Nova-MG.

== Club career ==
Born in São Paulo, Cesinha came through the youth ranks of União Suzano before joining Juventus-SP's youth categories in 2016, being loaned to Guaratinguetá the same year. He then established himself with Juventus-SP's first team between 2017 and 2019, before moving to Osasco Sporting later in 2019.

While under contract with Oeste, Cesinha spent the 2020 season on loan, representing both Boa Esporte, in Minas Gerais, and EC Água Santa, continuing at the latter into 2021, where he finished as runner-up of the Campeonato Paulista Série A2.

Cesinha subsequently joined Portuguesa, with whom he won the 2022 Campeonato Paulista Série A2. In early 2023, he had a brief spell at Marcílio Dias in Santa Catarina, finishing runner-up in the Recopa Catarinense, before returning to São Paulo to sign for Juventus-SP for a second spell. He was loaned to Betim later that year, before returning to Juventus-SP, where he remained through the 2024 season and part of 2025.

In 2025, Cesinha moved on to spells with URT and Primavera. He began the 2026 season with a second stint at URT, before transferring to Tombense to compete in the Campeonato Brasileiro Série D, scoring twice on his first goalscoring appearance for the club in a 2–2 draw with Rio Branco-ES. He later moved on to Villa Nova-MG later in the 2026 season.

== Honours ==
Portuguesa

- Campeonato Paulista Série A2: 2022

== Career statistics ==
As of match played 12 August 2026

Appearances and goals by club, season and competition
Club	Season	League			Cup		State League		Other		Total	
Club	Season	Division	Apps	Goals	Apps	Goals	Apps	Goals	Apps	Goals	Apps	Goals
Guaratinguetá (loan)	2016	Série C	0	0	0	0	3	0	0	0	3	0
Juventus-SP	2017	Paulista A2	0	0	0	0	0	0	12 (Note: Appearances in Copa Paulista)	2	12	2
Juventus-SP	2018	Paulista A2	0	0	0	0	10	0	17	4	27	4
Juventus-SP	2019	Paulista A2	0	0	0	0	16	3	0	0	16	3
Juventus-SP	Total		0	0	0	0	26	3	29	6	55	9
Osasco Sporting	2019	Série B	6	0	0	0	0	0	0	0	6	0
Boa Esporte (loan)	2020	Série C	5	0	2	0	9	1	0	0	16	1
Água Santa (loan)	2020	Paulista	0	0	0	0	0	0	9	1	9	1
Água Santa (loan)	2021	Paulista A2	0	0	0	0	8	1	0	0	8	1
Água Santa (loan)	Total		0	0	0	0	8	1	9	1	17	2
Portuguesa	2021	Série D	12	0	0	0	0	0	11	2	23	2
Portuguesa	2022	Paulista A2	0	0	0	0	13	2	14	4	27	6
Portuguesa	Total		12	0	0	0	13	2	25	6	50	8
Marcílio Dias	2023	Catarinense	0	0	0	0	3	0	1 (Note: Appearances in Recopa Catarinense)	0	4	0
Juventus-SP	2023	Paulista A2	0	0	0	0	9	1	0	0	9	1
Betim (loan)	2023	Mineiro Módulo II	0	0	0	0	17	1	0	0	17	1
Juventus-SP	2024	Paulista A2	0	0	0	0	11	0	10	0	21	0
Juventus-SP	2025	Paulista A2	0	0	0	0	14	0	0	0	14	0
Juventus-SP	Total		0	0	0	0	25	0	10	0	35	0
URT	2025	Mineiro Módulo II	0	0	0	0	10	2	0	0	10	2
Primavera	2025	Paulista A2	0	0	0	0	0	0	7	0	7	0
URT	2026	Mineiro	0	0	0	0	12	1	0	0	12	1
Tombense	2026	Série D	11	3	2	0	0	0	2 (Note: Appearances in Copa Sul-Sudeste)	0	13	3
Villa Nova-MG	2026	Mineiro Módulo II	0	0	0	0	6	1	0	0	6	1
Career total			34	3	5	0	141	13	80	13	260	29
