= Gabriel Justino (footballer, born 1998) =

Brazilian footballer (born 1998)

Personal information
- Full name: Edson Gabriel Justino
- Date of birth: 17 September 1998 (age 28)
- Place of birth: São Paulo, Brazil
- Height: 1.78 m (5 ft 10 in)
- Position: Forward

Team information
- Current team: Mixto

Youth career
- –2015: Juventus-SP
- 2015: Resende
- 2016–2017: Mirassol

Senior career*
Years	Team	Apps	(Gls)
2016–2017	Mirassol	0	(0)
2017–2019	Vitória Guimarães B	10	(2)
2020	Primavera	10	(2)
2020–2021	Flamengo-SP	20	(4)
2021–2022	Resende	10	(0)
2023	Bandeirante	9	(1)
2023	PSTC	10	(3)
2023–2024	Juventus-SP	24	(0)
2024	→ Apucarana Sports (loan)	6	(0)
2025	Desportivo Brasil	16	(3)
2025–	Mixto	28	(4)
- * Club domestic league appearances and goals as of 27 February 2026

Edson Gabriel Justino (born 17 September 1998), commonly known as Gabriel Justino, is a Brazilian footballer who currently plays as a forward for Mixto.

== Club career ==
Justino began his career in the youth ranks of CA Juventus. He began his professional career playing for Mirassol, where he was the club's top scorer in the 2016 Copa Paulista. Justino also played in Portugal for Vitória de Guimarães B, as well as other Brazilian teams. In 2025, he stood out playing for Mixto EC during the 2025 Campeonato Brasileiro Série D.

== Career statistics ==
=== Club ===
As of 20 June 2019.

Club	Season	League			State League		National Cup		League Cup		Other		Total	
Club	Season	Division	Apps	Goals	Apps	Goals	Apps	Goals	Apps	Goals	Apps	Goals	Apps	Goals
Mirassol	2016	–			0	0	0	0	–		14 (Note: Appearances in the Copa Paulista)	5	14	5
Mirassol	2017	–			0	0	0	0	–		0	0	0	0
Mirassol	Total		0	0	0	0	0	0	0	0	14	5	14	5
Vitória Guimarães B	2017–18	LigaPro	2	0	–		–		–		0	0	2	0
Vitória Guimarães B	2018–19	LigaPro	8	2	–		–		–		0	0	8	2
Vitória Guimarães B	Total		10	2	0	0	0	0	0	0	0	0	10	2
Career total			10	2	0	0	0	0	0	0	14	5	24	7
