= Estádio Conde Rodolfo Crespi =

Football stadium in São Paulo, Brazil

Coordinates: 23°33′12″S 46°36′16″W

- Rua Javari
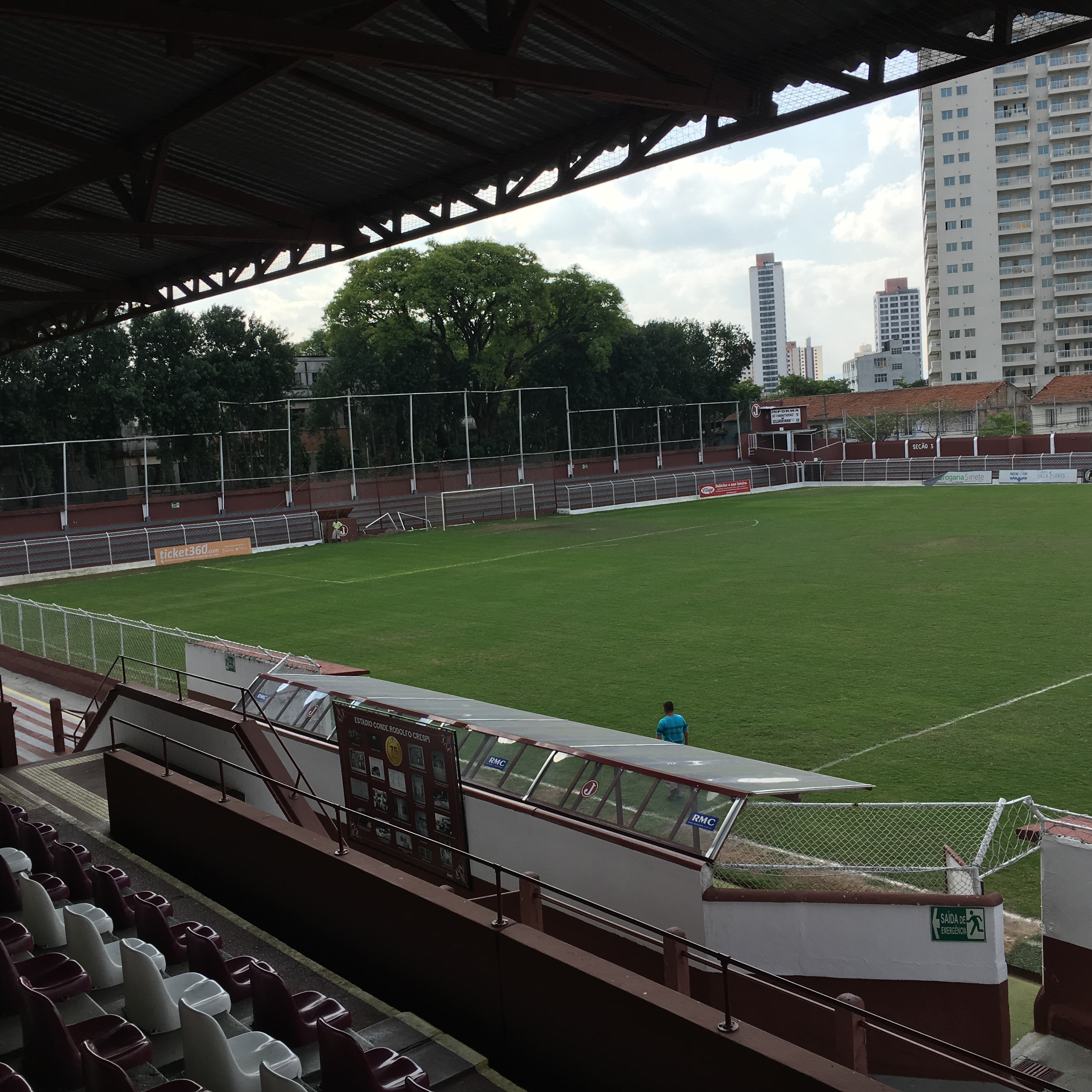
- Interactive map of Estádio Conde Rodolfo Crespi
- Location: São Paulo, São Paulo state Brazil
- Owner: Clube Atlético Juventus
- Capacity: 3,800
- Surface: Natural grass
- Field size: 105 by 68 metres (114.8 yd × 74.4 yd)
- Public transit: Juventus-Mooca

Construction
- Opened: November 11, 1929

Tenants
- Juventus; Barcelona Capela; Palmeiras B (2012); Pão de Açúcar (2004–2011)

Estádio Conde Rodolfo Crespi, usually known as Rua Javari, is a multi-use stadium located in São Paulo's Mooca neighborhood, Brazil. It is used mostly for football matches and hosts the home games of Clube Atlético Juventus, which is also the stadium's owner, and hosted the games of Pão de Açúcar Esporte Clube. The stadium has a maximum capacity of 4,000 people, and was built in 1929. Estádio da Rua Javari is named after Count Rodolfo Crespi, who was Juventus' first president and helped the stadium construction. The stadium's nickname, Rua Javari, is the name of the street where it is located in.

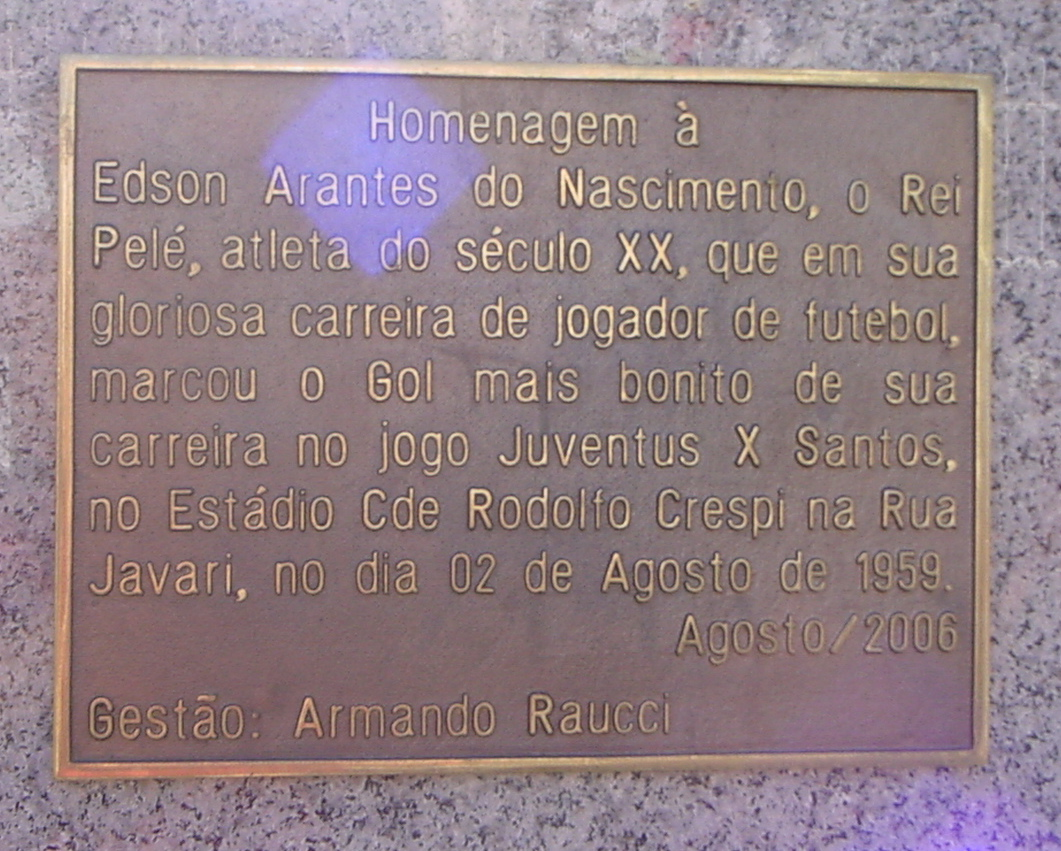
Pelé bust plaque on Rua Javari: "Homage to Edson Arantes do Nascimento, the King Pelé, Athlete of the 20th Century, who in his glorious soccer player career scored his most beautiful goal in a game between Juventus and Santos at Rodolfo Crespi Stadium in Javari Street, on August 2, 1959."

As it has no artificial lighting, matches are not played after dusk. Clube Atlético Juventus usually schedules its home games to start at 3:00PM (4:00PM when DST).

== History ==
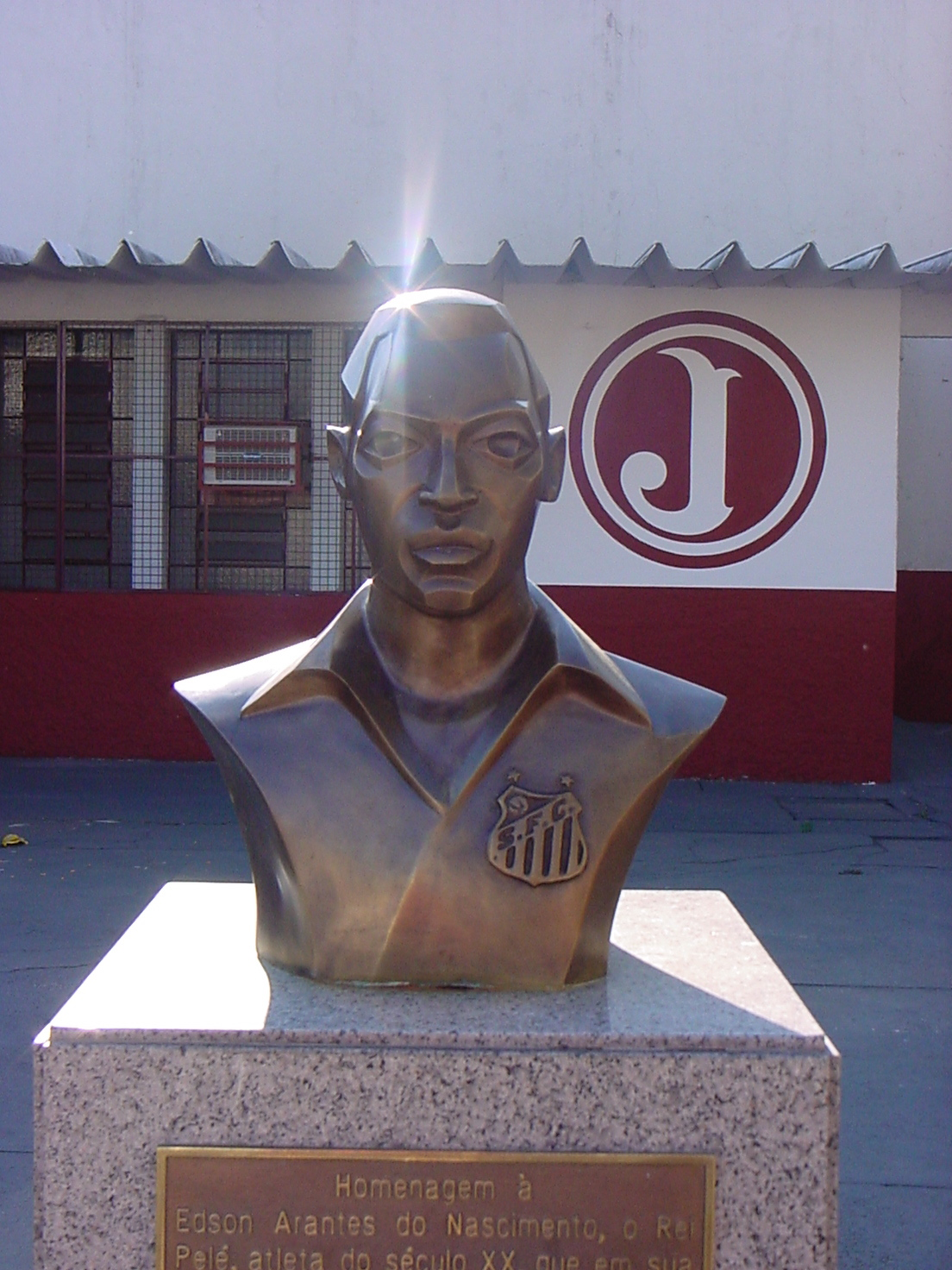
Pelé Bust on Rua Javari.

On November 11, 1929, the stadium was inaugurated.

Until 1967, the stadium was owned by the Crespi family. However, in that year, after signing a deal with the family, Juventus became the stadium's owner.

Pelé states that his most beautiful goal was scored at Rua Javari stadium on a Campeonato Paulista match against São Paulo rivals Juventus on August 2, 1959. As there is no video footage of this match, Pelé asked that a computer animation be made of this specific goal.

The stadium's attendance record currently stands at 9,000, set in 1981.

In May 1997, Ugo Georgetti's movie Boleiros was filmed at Estádio da Rua Javari.
