= Grêmio Desportivo Prudente =

Association football club in Brazil

Grêmio Prudente
- Full name: Grêmio Desportivo Prudente
- Nicknames: Prudente; GDP; Gavião
- Founded: 13 December 2005; 20 years ago
- Ground: Prudentão
- Capacity: 45,954
- President: André Luis Garcia
- Head coach: Luís Carlos Martins
- League: Campeonato Paulista Série A2
- 2025: Paulista Série A2, 9th of 16
- Website: www.gdprudente.com.br
Home colours	Away colours

Grêmio Desportivo Prudente, generally known as Grêmio Prudente is a Brazilian football club from Presidente Prudente, São Paulo. It competes in the Campeonato Paulista Série A2, the second tier of the São Paulo state football league.

The club was formerly known as Oeste Paulista Esporte Clube.

== History ==
Founded on 13 December 2005 by former player Adriano Gerlin da Silva, the club was initially named Oeste Paulista Esporte Clube. They started playing as a senior in the 2006 Campeonato Paulista Segunda Divisão, finishing eight. In their second season, they won the fourth tier of the state league and reached promotion to the Campeonato Paulista Série A3.

After narrowly missing out promotion in 2008, Oeste Paulista suffered relegation back to the fourth division in 2009. Due to financial problems, the club did not play as a senior during the 2010 and 2011 campaigns.

In 2012, the club was bought by a group of businessmen, and was renamed Grêmio Desportivo Prudente, after Grêmio Barueri also moved to the city. After failing to achieve promotion in the Segunda Divisão, the club went back to inactivity until 2018.

In 2019, Grêmio Prudente returned to an active status after being led by businessman André Luis Garcia.

== Rivalries ==
The club's main rivals are Osvaldo Cruz and Presidente Prudente FC.

== Honours ==
- Campeonato Paulista Série A4
  - Winners (2): 2007, 2022
