= 2026 América Futebol Clube (MG) season =

América Mineiro
2026 season
- Chairman: Márcio Vidal Gomes da Gama
- Manager: Alberto Valentim; Roger Silva; Umberto Louzer; Douglas Leite
- Stadium: Arena Independência
- Série B: 19th
- Mineiro: Semi-finals
- Copa do Brasil: Third round
Home colors	Away colors

The 2026 season will be América Mineiro's 115th season in the club's history. América Mineiro will compete in Série B, Copa do Brasil and Campeonato Mineiro.

== Squad ==
As of 11 July 2026

Note: Flags indicate national team as defined under FIFA eligibility rules; some limited exceptions apply. Players may hold more than one non-FIFA nationality.

No.	Pos.	Nation	Player
1	GK	BRA	Gustavo
2	DF	BRA	Emerson Santos
3	DF	BRA	Nathan Pelae
4	DF	BRA	Rafa Barcelos
5	MF	ARG	Fernando Elizari
7	FW	BRA	Guilherme Parede
8	MF	BRA	Felipe Amaral
9	FW	BRA	Willian Bigode
10	MF	BRA	Yago Souza
11	FW	BRA	Gabriel Barros (on loan from Internacional)
12	DF	BRA	Samuel Alves
15	DF	BRA	Alex Silva
16	MF	BRA	Alê
17	FW	URU	Gonzalo Mastriani (on loan from Athletico Paranaense)
19	GK	BRA	William
20	FW	BRA	Paulo Victor (on loan from Chaves)
21	MF	BRA	Eduardo Person
22	DF	BRA	Léo Alaba (on loan from AVS)

No.	Pos.	Nation	Player
27	GK	BRA	Cássio
29	DF	BRA	Dalbert
33	MF	BRA	Yago Santos
42	DF	BRA	Jhonny (on loan from Fluminense)
43	DF	BRA	Wesley (on loan from Tombense)
44	DF	BRA	Thallyson
45	DF	BRA	Ricardo Silva (captain)
52	GK	BRA	Ítalo Brito
55	MF	BRA	Otávio Gonçalves
67	FW	BRA	Yarlen (on loan from Botafogo)
77	FW	PAR	Matías Segovia (on loan from Botafogo)
88	MF	BRA	Jhonatan Lima
96	DF	BRA	Artur
97	MF	BRA	Val Soares
—	DF	BRA	Heitor
—	FW	BRA	Kaique Zizero
—	FW	BRA	Thauan Willians
—	FW	URU	Rodrigo Piñeiro

== Competitions ==
=== Overall record ===
Competition	First match	Last match	Starting round	Record							
Competition	First match	Last match	Starting round	Pld	W	D	L	GF	GA	GD	Win %
Campeonato Mineiro	11 January	1 March	First stage	10	4	5	1	11	7	+4	40.00
Copa do Brasil	4 March	12 March	Second round	2	0	2	0	1	1	+0	0.00
Série B	22 March	14 November	Matchday 1	35	6	5	24	23	54	−31	17.14
Total				47	10	12	25	35	62	−27	21.28

Last updated: 27 October 2026
Source: Competitions

=== Campeonato Mineiro ===
==== First stage ====
11 January 2026 1	América Mineiro	3–0	Athletic	Belo Horizonte
19:30 (UTC-3)	Eduardo Person 2'; Thauan 36'; Éverton Brito 87'	Report		Stadium: Arena Independência; Attendance: 1,784; Referee: André Luiz Skettino Policarpo Bento

14 January 2026 2	Democrata	0–1	América Mineiro	Governador Valadares
15:00 (UTC-3)		Report	Marco Antonio 38' (o.g.)	Stadium: Estádio José Mammoud Abbas; Attendance: 1,644; Referee: Felipe Fernandes de Lima

18 January 2026 3	Itabirito	1–1	América Mineiro	Nova Lima
11:00 (UTC-3)	Givigi 82'	Report	Nathan 90+1'	Stadium: Estádio Castor Cifuentes; Attendance: 1,205; Referee: Antônio Márcio Teixeira da Silva

21 January 2026 4	América Mineiro	1–1	Atlético Mineiro	Belo Horizonte
21:30 (UTC-3)	Gabriel Barros 15'	Report	Reinier 30'	Stadium: Independência; Attendance: 6,213; Referee: Murilo Francisco Misson Júnior

24 January 2026 5	Uberlândia	1–1	América Mineiro	Uberlândia
20:30 (UTC-3)	Léo Reis 50'	Report	Eduardo Person 47'	Stadium: Estádio Parque do Sabiá; Attendance: 6,385; Referee: Hieger Tulio Cardoso

31 January 2026 6	América Mineiro	1–0	URT	Belo Horizonte
18:30 (UTC-3)	Paulo Victor 21'	Report		Stadium: Arena Independência; Attendance: 2,124; Referee: Felipe Fernandes de Lima

8 February 2026 7	Cruzeiro	2–0	América Mineiro	Belo Horizonte
18:00 (UTC-3)	Kaio Jorge 3' (pen.), 37'	Report		Stadium: Mineirão; Attendance: 28,804; Referee: André Luiz Skettino Policarpo Bento

14 February 2026 8	América Mineiro	2–1	North	Belo Horizonte
19:00 (UTC-3)	Val 9' (pen.), 11' (pen.)	Report	Yuri Merlim 50+4'	Stadium: Arena Independência; Attendance: 1,716; Referee: Paulo Cesar Zanovelli da Silva

==== Semi-finals ====
22 February 2026	Atlético Mineiro	1–1	América Mineiro	Belo Horizonte
18:00 (UTC-3)	Dudu 50'	Report	Yarlen 90+2'	Stadium: Arena MRV; Attendance: 31,916; Referee: Matheus Delgado Candançan

1 March 2026	América Mineiro	0–0 (2–4 p)	Atlético Mineiro	Belo Horizonte
18:00 (UTC-3)		Report		Stadium: Arena Independência; Attendance: 5,382; Referee: Flávio Rodrigues de Souza
	Penalties
	Eduardo Person (penalty missed); Gabriel Barros (penalty scored); Felipe Amaral (penalty missed); Paulinho (penalty scored)		(penalty scored) Hulk; (penalty scored) Renan Lodi; (penalty missed) Júnior Alonso; (penalty scored) Maycon; (penalty scored) Everson

=== Copa do Brasil ===
==== Second round ====
4 March 2026	América Mineiro	1–1 (4–3 p)	Tirol	Belo Horizonte
21:30 (UTC-3)	Willian 59'	Report	Welton 63'	Stadium: Arena Independência; Attendance: 1,030; Referee: Kléber Ariel Gonçalves Silva
	Penalties
	Willian (penalty scored); Rafa Barcelos (penalty scored); Paulinho (penalty scored); Emerson Santos (penalty missed); Gabriel Barros (penalty scored)		(penalty scored) Janeudo; (penalty scored) Dieguinho; (penalty scored) Welton; (penalty missed) Zé Augusto; (penalty missed) Ytalo

==== Third round ====
12 March 2026	Barra	0–0 (4–3 p)	América Mineiro	Itajaí
21:30 (UTC-3)		Report		Stadium: Arena Barra FC; Attendance: 2,601; Referee: Edina Alves Batista

=== Série B ===
==== League table ====
Pos	Team	Pld	W	D	L	GF	GA	GD	Pts	Promotion or relegation
16	Ceará	38	11	11	16	39	48	−9	44	
17	Avaí (R)	38	12	7	19	37	47	−10	43	Relegation to 2027 Campeonato Brasileiro Série C
18	Londrina (R)	38	9	8	21	47	59	−12	35	Relegation to 2027 Campeonato Brasileiro Série C
19	América Mineiro (R)	38	8	5	25	27	57	−30	29	Relegation to 2027 Campeonato Brasileiro Série C
20	Ponte Preta (R)	38	3	6	29	21	81	−60	15	Relegation to 2027 Campeonato Brasileiro Série C

Source: CBF
Rules for classification: 1) points; 2) wins; 3) goal difference; 4) goals scored; 5) head-to-head results (only between 2 teams); 6) fewest red cards; 7) fewest yellow cards; 8) drawing of lots.
(R) Relegated

==== Results by round ====
Round	1	2	3	4	5	6	7	8	9	10	11	12	13	14	15	16	17	18	19	20	21	22	23	24	25	26	27	28	29	30	31	32	33	34	35	36	37	38
Ground	A	H	A	H	H	A	H	A	A	H	A	H	A	H	A	A	H	H	A	H	A	H	A	A	H	A	H	H	A	H	A	H	A	H	H	A	A	H
Result	L	L	D	L	D	L	L	L	D	L	L	L	W	L	L	L	D	D	L	W	L	L	L	L	W	L	W	L	L	L	L	L	L	W	W	W	W	L
Position	17	20	18	20	20	20	20	20	20	20	20	20	20	20	20	20	20	20	20	19	19	19	19	19	19	19	19	19	19	19	19	19	19	19	19	19	19	19
Points	0	0	1	1	2	2	2	2	3	3	3	3	6	6	6	6	7	8	8	11	11	11	11	11	14	14	17	17	17	17	17	17	17	20	23	26	29	29

A = Away; H = Home; W = Win; D = Draw; L = Loss

==== Matches ====
22 March 2026 1	Goiás	3–1	América Mineiro	Goiânia
18:00 (UTC-3)	Anselmo Ramon 8'; Tadeu 29' (pen.); Gegê 85'	Report	Mastriani 90'	Stadium: Estádio da Serrinha; Attendance: 6,377; Referee: Marcelo de Lima Henrique

1 April 2026 2	América Mineiro	1–2	Botafogo–SP	Belo Horizonte
19:00 (UTC-3)	Mastriani 7'	Report	Everton Morelli 31'; Zé Hugo 59'	Stadium: Arena MRV; Attendance: 1,148; Referee: Diego da Costa Cidral

5 April 2026 3	Athletic	1–1	América Mineiro	São João del-Rei
20:00 (UTC-3)	Tavares 36'	Report	Mastriani 90'	Stadium: Arena Sicredi; Attendance: 2,708; Referee: Davi De Oliveira Lacerda

12 April 2026 4	América Mineiro	0–3	Novorizontino	Belo Horizonte
18:00 (UTC-3)		Report	Diego Galo 70'; Sander 73'; Tavinho 90+3'	Stadium: Arena Independência; Attendance: 1,332; Referee: Bráulio da Silva Machado

18 April 2026 5	América Mineiro	0–0	Sport	Belo Horizonte
18:00 (UTC-3)		Report		Stadium: Arena Independência; Attendance: 2,351; Referee: Gustavo Ervino Bauermann

24 April 2026 6	Ponte Preta	1–0	América Mineiro	Campinas
20:00 (UTC-3)	William Pottker 43'	Report		Stadium: Estádio Moisés Lucarelli; Attendance: 4,353; Referee: Lucas Casagrande

3 May 2026 7	América Mineiro	1–2	CRB	Belo Horizonte
20:30 (UTC-3)	Emerson Santos 10'	Report	Dadá Belmonte 41'; Guilherme Pato 83'	Stadium: Arena Independência; Attendance: 1,231; Referee: Alisson Sidnei Furtado

10 May 2026 8	Náutico	4–0	América Mineiro	Recife
16:00 (UTC-3)	Vinícius 25', 72'; Wenderson 45+4'; Dodô 51'	Report		Stadium: Estádio dos Aflitos; Attendance: 7,450; Referee: Bruno Pereira Vasconcelos

16 May 2026 9	São Bernardo	1–1	América Mineiro	São Bernardo do Campo
16:00 (UTC-3)	Daniel Davi 85'	Report	Elizari 18'	Stadium: Estádio 1º de Maio; Attendance: 946; Referee: Gustavo Ervino Bauermann

24 May 2026 10	América Mineiro	1–2	Vila Nova	Belo Horizonte
18:30 (UTC-3)	Nathan 21'	Report	Ryan 66'; Janderson 75'	Stadium: Arena Independência; Attendance: 1,602; Referee: Matheus Delgado Candançan

29 May 2026 11	Juventude	3–0	América Mineiro	Caxias do Sul
21:00 (UTC-3)	Raí 7'; Alisson Safira 67'; Wadson 90+1'	Report		Stadium: Estádio Alfredo Jaconi; Attendance: 2,821; Referee: Savio Pereira Sampaio

8 June 2026 12	América Mineiro	1–2	Atlético Goianiense	Belo Horizonte
20:00 (UTC-3)	Felipe Amaral 30'	Report	Marrony 32'; Gustavo Coutinho 71'	Stadium: Arena Independência; Attendance: 1,023; Referee: Lucas Canetto Bellote

16 June 2026 13	Fortaleza	0–3	América Mineiro	Fortaleza
20:00 (UTC-3)		Report	Segovia 27'; Gabriel Barros 43'; Willian 90+9' (pen.)	Stadium: Arena Castelão; Attendance: 12,387; Referee: Alex Gomes Stefano

23 June 2026 14	América Mineiro	0–1	Criciúma	Belo Horizonte
20:00 (UTC-3)		Report	César Martins 30'	Stadium: Arena Independência; Attendance: 1,235; Referee: Edina Alves Batista

27 June 2026 15	Operário Ferroviário	1–0	América Mineiro	Ponta Grossa
11:00 (UTC-3)	Moraes 64'	Report		Stadium: Estádio Germano Krüger; Attendance: 2,513; Referee: Jonathan Benkenstein Pinheiro

2 July 2026 16	Cuiabá	1–0	América Mineiro	Cuiabá
20:00 (UTC-3)	Aiyran 89'	Report		Stadium: Arena Pantanal; Attendance: 1,154; Referee: Flávio Rodrigues de Souza

13 July 2026 17	América Mineiro	1–1	Londrina	Belo Horizonte
19:00 (UTC-3)	Segovia 45+2'	Report	Yago Lincoln 57'	Stadium: Arena Independência; Attendance: 1,466; Referee: Paulo Henrique Schleich Vollkopf

17 July 2026 18	América Mineiro	1–1	Ceará	Belo Horizonte
19:00 (UTC-3)	Segovia 66'	Report	Vina 88'	Stadium: Arena Independência; Attendance: 1,339; Referee: Fernando Antônio Mendes de Salles Nascimento Filho

21 July 2026 19	Avaí	2–1	América Mineiro	Florianópolis
19:30 (UTC-3)	Daniel Penha 86' (pen.); Thayllon 88'	Report	Paulo Victor 38'	Stadium: Estádio da Ressacada; Attendance: 5,652; Referee: Jefferson Ferreira de Moraes

26 July 2026 20	América Mineiro	1–0	Goiás	Belo Horizonte
18:30 (UTC-3)	Paulo Victor 61'	Report		Stadium: Arena Independência; Attendance: 1,053; Referee: Bráulio da Silva Machado

8 August 2026 21	Botafogo–SP	2–1	América Mineiro	Ribeirão Preto
18:30 (UTC-3)	Badaró 62'; Filipe Dahora 70'	Report	Elizari 55'	Stadium: Estádio Santa Cruz; Attendance: 2,938; Referee: Kleber Ariel Goncalves Silva

16 August 2026 22	América Mineiro	1–3	Athletic	Belo Horizonte
18:30 (UTC-3)	Mastriani 86'	Report	Kauan 44'; Sosa 51' (o.g.); Carlinhos 65'	Stadium: Arena Independência; Attendance: 1,569; Referee: Wagner do Nascimento Magalhães

20 August 2026 23	Novorizontino	3–0	América Mineiro	Novo Horizonte
20:30 (UTC-3)	Patrick 22'; Robson 80'; Carlão 90+1'	Report		Stadium: Estádio Jorge Ismael de Biasi; Attendance: 1,287; Referee: Braulio da Silva Machado

24 August 2026 24	Sport	3–0	América Mineiro	Recife
19:30 (UTC-3)	Claudinho 12'; Clayson 45+1'; Pedro Perotti 90+6' (pen.)	Report		Stadium: Estádio Ilha do Retiro; Attendance: 13,188; Referee: Dênis da Silva Ribeiro Serafim

30 August 2026 25	América Mineiro	2–0	Ponte Preta	Belo Horizonte
16:00 (UTC-3)	Willian 46'; Piñeiro 58'	Report		Stadium: Arena Independência; Attendance: 1,093; Referee: Bruno Pereira Vasconcelos

4 September 2026 26	CRB	3–1	América Mineiro	Maceió
21:30 (UTC-3)	Crystopher 18'; Mikael 51'; Kevin 67'	Report	Willian 80'	Stadium: Estádio Rei Pelé; Attendance: 11,476; Referee: Marianna Nanni Batalha

9 September 2026 27	América Mineiro	2–1	Náutico	Belo Horizonte
20:30 (UTC-3)	Willian 15'; Ostchega 25'	Report	Júnior Todinho 88'	Stadium: Arena Independência; Attendance: 1,003; Referee: Kléber Ariel Gonçalves Silva

14 September 2026 28	América Mineiro	0–2	São Bernardo	Belo Horizonte
19:30 (UTC-3)		Report	Fabrício Daniel 79'; Pedro Vitor 87'	Stadium: Arena Independência; Attendance: 1,009; Referee: Jonathan Benkenstein Pinheiro

18 September 2026 29	Vila Nova	1–0	América Mineiro	Goiânia
19:30 (UTC-3)	André Luís 13'	Report		Stadium: Estádio Onésio Brasileiro Alvarenga; Attendance: 10,000; Referee: Fabiano Monteiro dos Santos

28 September 2026 30	América Mineiro	0–1	Juventude	Belo Horizonte
19:30 (UTC-3)		Report	Marcos Paulo 61'	Stadium: Arena Independência; Attendance: 1,009; Referee: Lucas Casagrande

3 October 2026 31	Atlético Goianiense	2–0	América Mineiro	Goiânia
16:00 (UTC-3)	Marrony 4'; Adriano Martins 52'	Report		Stadium: Estádio Antônio Accioly; Attendance: 6,355; Referee: Marianna Nanni Batalha

7 October 2026 32	América Mineiro	0–1	Fortaleza	Belo Horizonte
20:30 (UTC-3)		Report	Lucas Sasha 3'	Stadium: Arena Independência; Attendance: 1,011; Referee: Rafael Rodrigo Klein

12 October 2026 33	Criciúma	1–0	América Mineiro	Criciúma
19:30 (UTC-3)	César Martins 48'	Report		Stadium: Estádio Heriberto Hülse; Attendance: 9,497; Referee: Paulo Henrique Schleich Vollkopf

17 October 2026 34	América Mineiro	1–0	Operário Ferroviário	Belo Horizonte
18:30 (UTC-3)	Guilherme Parede 88'	Report		Stadium: Arena Independência; Attendance: 1,004; Referee: Afro Rocha De Carvalho Filho

26 October 2026 35	América Mineiro	1–0	Cuiabá	Belo Horizonte
19:30 (UTC-3)	Segovia 58'	Report		Stadium: Arena Independência; Attendance: 1,003; Referee: Jodis Nascimento de Souza

31 October 2026 36	Londrina	–	América Mineiro	Londrina
(UTC-3)				Stadium: Estádio do Café

7 November 2026 37	Ceará	–	América Mineiro	Fortaleza
(UTC-3)				Stadium: Arena Castelão

14 November 2026 38	América Mineiro	–	Avaí	Belo Horizonte
(UTC-3)				Stadium: Arena Independência
