= 2024 América Futebol Clube (MG) season =

América Mineiro
2024 season
- Manager: Cauan de Almeida (until 27 August); Lisca (29 August–19 November); Diogo Giacomini (from 20 November)
- Stadium: Arena Independência
- Série B: 8th
- Campeonato Mineiro: Semi-finals
- Copa do Brasil: First round
Home colours	Away colours	Third colours

The 2024 season was América Mineiro's 113th in existence. They played in the Série B and the Campeonato Mineiro and the Copa do Brasil.

== Players ==
=== First-team squad ===
As of 21 August 2024

Note: Flags indicate national team as defined under FIFA eligibility rules; some limited exceptions apply. Players may hold more than one non-FIFA nationality.

No.	Pos.	Nation	Player
1	GK	BRA	Elias (on loan from Itabirito)
3	DF	BRA	Lucão
4	DF	BRA	Pedro Barcelos
5	MF	ARG	Fernando Elizari
6	DF	BRA	Marlon
7	FW	BRA	Vinícius
8	MF	BRA	Juninho (captain)
9	FW	BRA	Brenner
10	MF	ARG	Martín Benítez
11	FW	BRA	Felipe Azevedo
12	GK	BRA	Jori
15	MF	BRA	Moisés
16	MF	BRA	Alê
18	DF	BRA	Júlio
19	MF	BRA	Felipe Amaral
20	DF	BRA	Daniel Borges (on loan from Botafogo)
27	GK	BRA	Cássio
28	FW	BRA	Fabinho
29	FW	BRA	Vítor Jacaré

No.	Pos.	Nation	Player
30	DF	BRA	Nicolas Vichiatto
31	GK	BRA	Dalberson
33	DF	BRA	Éder
36	DF	BRA	Mateus Henrique
37	FW	BRA	Thauan Willians
39	MF	BRA	Flávio
44	FW	BRA	Adyson
45	DF	BRA	Ricardo Silva
68	MF	BRA	Yago Santos
71	DF	BRA	Jhow
73	GK	BRA	Natan
75	MF	BRA	Rodriguinho
77	MF	BRA	Wallisson (on loan from Athletic-MG)
78	FW	BRA	Renato Marques
80	MF	BRA	Daniel Júnior (on loan from Vitória)
88	FW	BRA	Matheus Davó (on loan from Cruzeiro)
97	MF	BRA	Gustavinho
99	FW	BRA	Jonathas

=== Youth team ===
Note: Flags indicate national team as defined under FIFA eligibility rules; some limited exceptions apply. Players may hold more than one non-FIFA nationality.

No.	Pos.	Nation	Player
70	DF	BRA	Rafa Barcelos
72	DF	BRA	Paulinho

=== Out on loan ===
Note: Flags indicate national team as defined under FIFA eligibility rules; some limited exceptions apply. Players may hold more than one non-FIFA nationality.

No.	Pos.	Nation	Player
—	FW	BRA	Ighor Gabryel (at Santo André until 30 September 2024)
—	FW	BRA	Rodrigo Varanda (at Santa Clara until 30 June 2025)

== Competitions ==
=== Overall record ===
Competition	First match	Last match	Starting round	Final position	Record							
Competition	First match	Last match	Starting round	Final position	Pld	W	D	L	GF	GA	GD	Win %
Série B	19 April 2024	December 2024	Matchday 1		34	13	13	8	44	31	+13	38.24
Campeonato Mineiro	25 January 2024	17 March 2024	First stage	Semi-finals	10	5	2	3	16	9	+7	50.00
Copa do Brasil	28 February 2024		First round	First round	1	0	0	1	0	2	−2	0.00
Total					45	18	15	12	60	42	+18	40.00

Last updated: 25 August 2024
Source: [ Soccerway]

=== Série B ===
==== League table ====
Pos	Team	Pld	W	D	L	GF	GA	GD	Pts
6	Goiás	38	18	9	11	56	32	+24	63
7	Operário Ferroviário	38	16	10	12	34	32	+2	58
8	América Mineiro	38	15	13	10	50	35	+15	58
9	Vila Nova	38	16	7	15	42	54	−12	55
10	Avaí	38	14	11	13	34	32	+2	53

Source: CBF
Rules for classification: 1) points; 2) wins; 3) goal difference; 4) goals scored; 5) head-to-head results (only between 2 teams); 6) fewest red cards; 7) fewest yellow cards; 8) drawing of lots.

==== Results by round ====
Round	1	2	3	4	5	6	7	8	9	10	11	12	13	14	15	16	17	18	19	20	21	22	23	24
Ground	A	H	A	H	H	A	H	A	H	H	A	H	A	H	A	H	A	H	A	H	A	H	A	A
Result	D	W	D	W	D	W	W	L	W	W	L	D	L	W	D	D	D	D	D	W	D	D	L	
Position	8	6	8	4	5	4	2	5	1	1	1	1	3	2	3	3	3	5	5	4	4	5	6	

Source: Worldfootball
A = Away; H = Home; W = Win; D = Draw; L = Loss

==== Matches ====
The match schedule was released on 6 March.

=== Copa do Brasil ===
28 February 2024 First round	v	América Mineiro
