= Paquetá (surname) =

Paquetá is a Portuguese surname. Notable people with the surname include:

- Lucas Paquetá (born 1997), Brazilian footballer
- Marcos Paquetá (born 1958), Brazilian footballer
- Matheus Paquetá (born 1995), Brazilian footballer
