= Paulinho (footballer, born 2004) =

Brazilian footballer

Personal information
- Full name: Paulo Ricardo Alves Ibelli
- Date of birth: 29 June 2004 (age 22)
- Place of birth: Ribeirão Preto, Brazil
- Height: 1.83 m (6 ft 0 in)
- Position: Left-back

Team information
- Current team: Vasco da Gama
- Number: 29

Youth career
- 2018–2024: América Mineiro

Senior career*
Years	Team	Apps	(Gls)
2023–2026	América Mineiro	44	(0)
2026–	Vasco da Gama	0	(0)
- * Club domestic league appearances and goals as of 20:44, 1 October 2026 (UTC)

Paulo Ricardo Alves Ibelli (born 29 April 2004), commonly known as Paulinho, is a Brazilian footballer who plays as a left-back for Vasco da Gama.

== Career ==
Born in Ribeirão Preto, São Paulo, Paulinho joined América Mineiro's youth sides in 2018, aged 14. He made his first team debut on 31 August 2023, coming on as a late substitute for Mateus Henrique in a 2–1 away loss to Fortaleza, for the year's Copa Sudamericana. He featured in a further Série A match during the year, as the club suffered relegation.

Paulinho only featured in a further two matches during the 2024 season, before becoming a permanent first-team member in 2025. After establishing himself as a starter, he agreed to a pre-contract with Vasco da Gama in February 2026. He scored his first senior goals on 8 April, netting a brace for América in a 3–3 Copa Sul-Sudeste away draw against Tombense.

On 11 July 2026, Paulinho was announced at Vasco on a three-and-a-half-year contract.

== Career statistics ==
As of 1 October 2026

Club	Season	League			State League		Cup		Continental		Other		Total	
Club	Season	Division	Apps	Goals	Apps	Goals	Apps	Goals	Apps	Goals	Apps	Goals	Apps	Goals
América Mineiro	2023	Série A	1	0	—		0	0	1 (Note: Appearance(s) in Copa Sudamericana)	0	—		2	0
América Mineiro	2024	Série B	2	0	—		—		—		—		2	0
América Mineiro	2025	Série B	22	0	2	0	0	0	—		—		24	0
América Mineiro	2026	Série B	7	0	10	0	2	0	—		3 (Note: Appearance(s) in Copa Sul-Sudeste)	3	22	3
América Mineiro	Total		32	0	12	0	2	0	1	0	3	3	50	3
Vasco da Gama	2026	Série A	0	0	—		—		0	0	—		0	0
Career total			32	0	12	0	2	0	1	0	3	3	50	3
