= Pedro Oliveira (footballer, born 1998) =

Brazilian footballer

Personal information
- Full name: Pedro Henrique Oliveira
- Date of birth: 11 July 1998 (age 28)
- Place of birth: Goiânia, Brazil
- Height: 1.76 m (5 ft 9 in)
- Position: Midfielder

Team information
- Current team: Athletic-MG (on loan from Tombense)

Youth career
- 2013–2018: São Paulo

Senior career*
Years	Team	Apps	(Gls)
2017–2021	São Paulo	8	(0)
2019–2021	→ Louletano (loan)	36	(8)
2021–2024	Grêmio Prudente	0	(0)
2022	→ Rio Branco-PR (loan)	9	(1)
2022–2023	→ Confiança (loan)	22	(0)
2024	Democrata-GV	11	(3)
2024–	Tombense	50	(11)
2026–	→ Athletic-MG (loan)	15	(1)
- * Club domestic league appearances and goals as of 18 November 2026

Pedro Henrique Oliveira (born 11 July 1998), better known as Pedro Oliveira, is a Brazilian professional footballer who plays as a midfielder for Athletic-MG, on loan from Tombense.

== Career ==
Pedro started his career in the youth sectors of São Paulo FC. He played for the club B team in the 2017 Copa Paulista, and in 2019, he was loaned to Louletano DC. In 2021, he was acquired by Grêmio Prudente, being loaned to Rio Branco de Paranaguá in the first half of 2022, and to Confiança to compete in Série C. In 2023, he suffered a serious injury, which caused his loan to be interrupted.

He scored two goals from the midfield, one for São Paulo in 2017, and another for Louletano in 2021, in a match against Amora FC.

On 5 December 2023, signed with EC Democrata. In April 2024, Oliveira signed a contract with Tombense.

In 2026, after scoring a goal for Tombense that sealed Athletic's relegation to the Minas Gerais Módulo II, Oliveira was signed on loan by the São João del-Rei club to bolster their squad for the 2026 Campeonato Brasileiro Série B.

== Honours ==
São Paulo

- Campeonato Brasileiro Sub-23: 2018
