= Matheus Monteiro =

Brazilian footballer

Personal information
- Full name: Matheus Monteiro do Nascimento
- Date of birth: 1 March 2000 (age 26)
- Place of birth: São Paulo, Brazil
- Height: 1.75 m (5 ft 9 in)
- Position: Forward

Youth career
- 2017: Fluminense
- 2018: Boavista
- 2019–2021: Internacional

Senior career*
Years	Team	Apps	(Gls)
2021	Torpedo-BelAZ Zhodino	9	(1)
2022	São José RS	11	(1)
2023	Audax	8	(0)
2023	Primavera		
2024	União São João	12	(0)
- * Club domestic league appearances and goals as of 31 December 2024

Matheus Monteiro do Nascimento (born 1 March 2000) is a Brazilian professional footballer.
