= Paquetá Island =

Island in Rio de Janeiro, Brazil

Coordinates: 22°45′35″S 43°06′32″W

Native name: Ilha de Paquetá
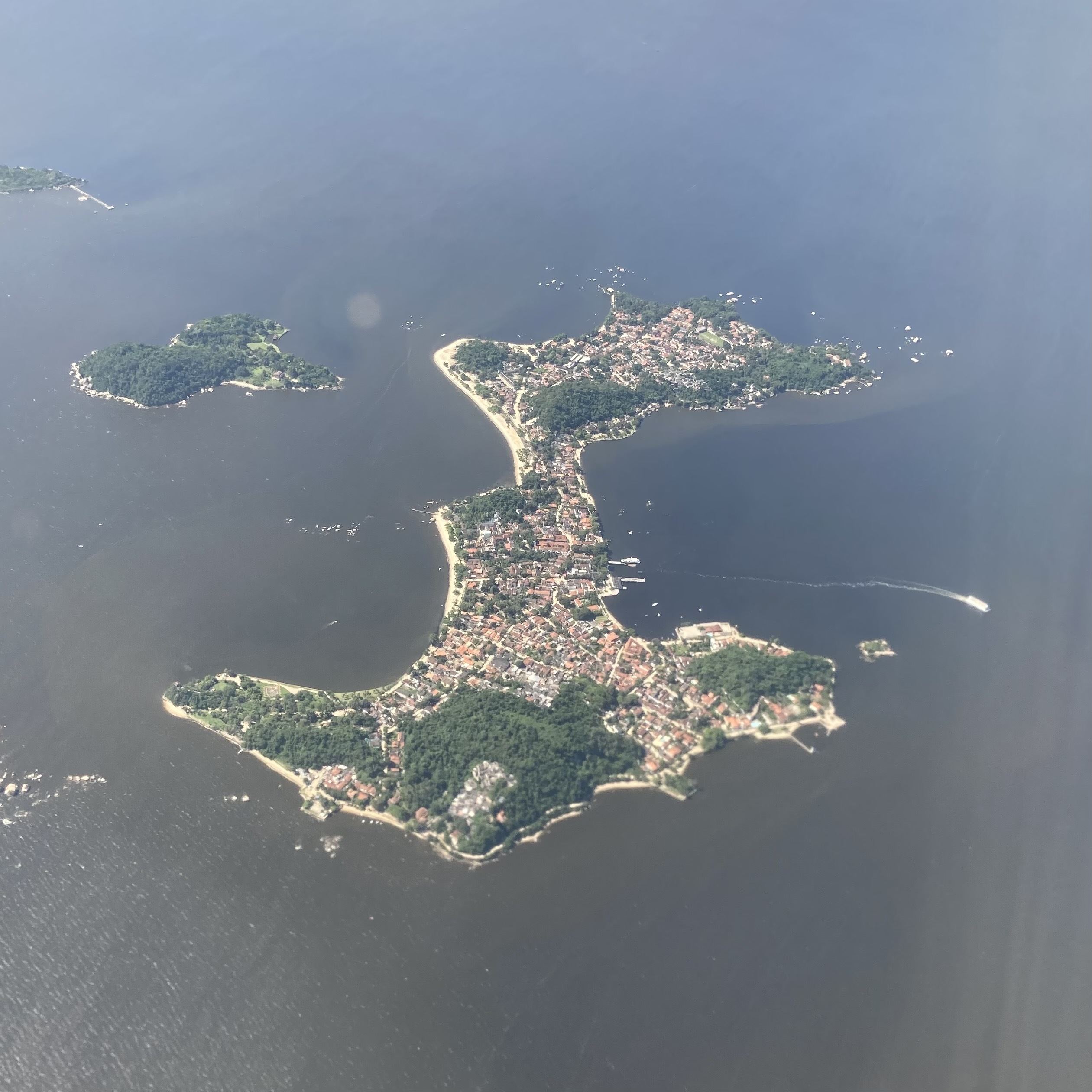
- Aerial view of Paquetá Island, with Brocoió Island to the upper left

- Location of the island in Rio de Janeiro city

Geography
- Location: Guanabara Bay
- Area: 1.2 km^{2} (0.46 sq mi)

Administration
- Brazil
- Municipality: Rio de Janeiro
- Neighborhood: Paquetá

Demographics
- Population: 3,486 (2022)
- Pop. density: 2,900/km^{2} (7500/sq mi)

Paquetá Island (Portuguese: Ilha de Paquetá) is an island in Guanabara Bay, Rio de Janeiro. The name of the island is a Tupi compound meaning "many pacas". The island is an auto-free zone, so travel is limited to bicycles and horse-drawn carriages. Paquetá has twenty baobabs (a type of African tree).

== History ==
André Thevet on the etymology of Paquetá

Up to the end of the 15th century, the Tamoio Indians used Paquetá as hunting and living grounds. It was officially registered by the Frenchman André Thevet in December 1555, and acknowledged by King Henri II as a French discovery in 1556. Together with Paranapuã Island (now called Governador Island), Paquetá was one of the main centers of French resistance to Portuguese occupation. While the French had the Tamoios as their allies, the Temiminós Indians led by Arariboia supported the Portuguese.

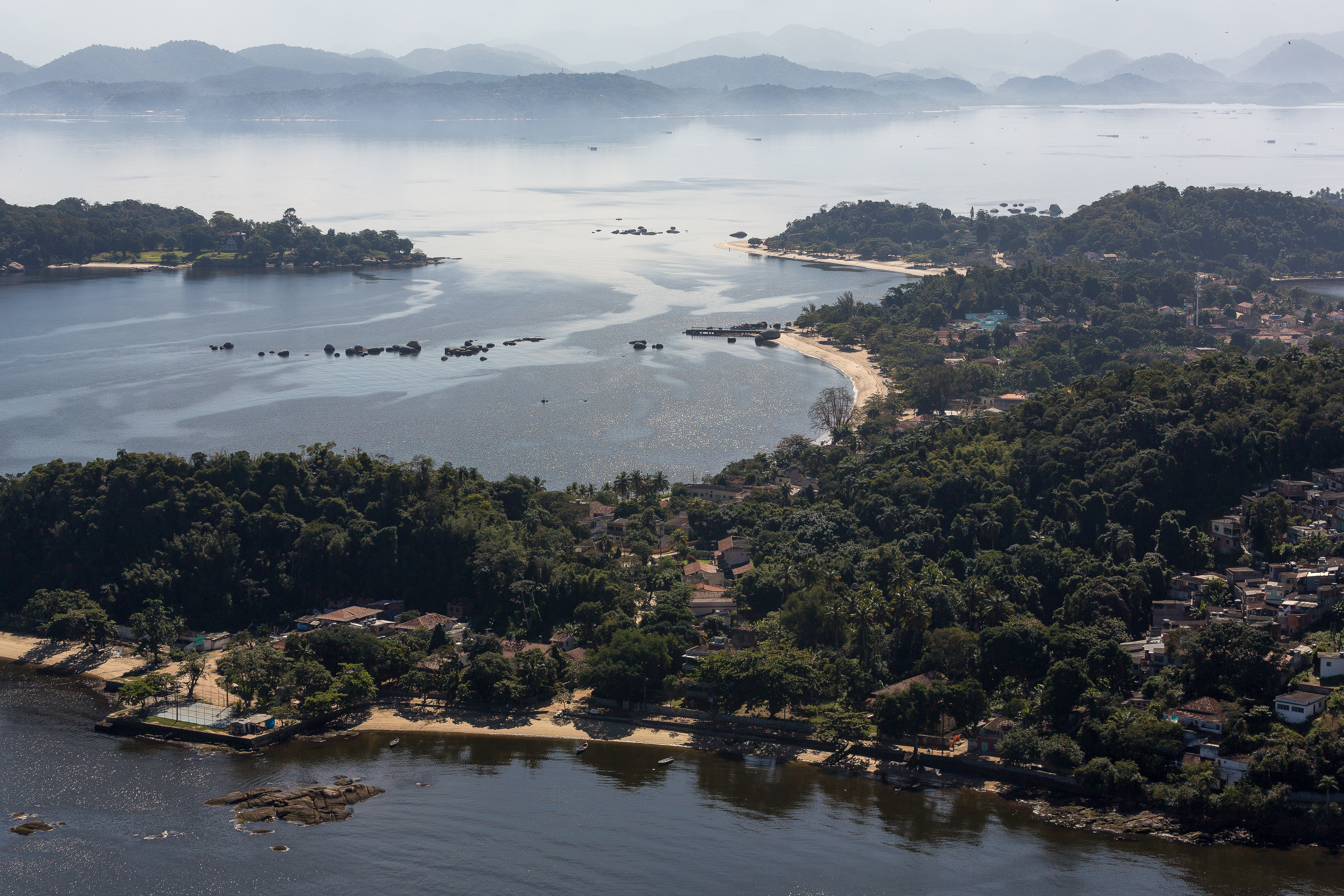
Aerial view of Paquetá Island

The Portuguese victory was consolidated with the expulsion of the French and the defeat of the Tamoios. Paquetá was then divided into two allotments assigned to settlers; the one now called Campo was given to Inácio de Bulhões and the Ponte area to Fernão Valdez. Even today the characteristics of this division between Campo and Ponte are conspicuously present in the Island's festivities, in football matches and in the parade of dancing and singing groups during Carnival.

Under Portuguese rule, Paquetá produced vegetables, fruits, stone and timber for construction. Aristocratic land and slave owners occupied the island. Nowadays Paquetá is primarily a residential and tourism location, the latter due to its cultural roots, its scenery and its location.

== Traditional events ==
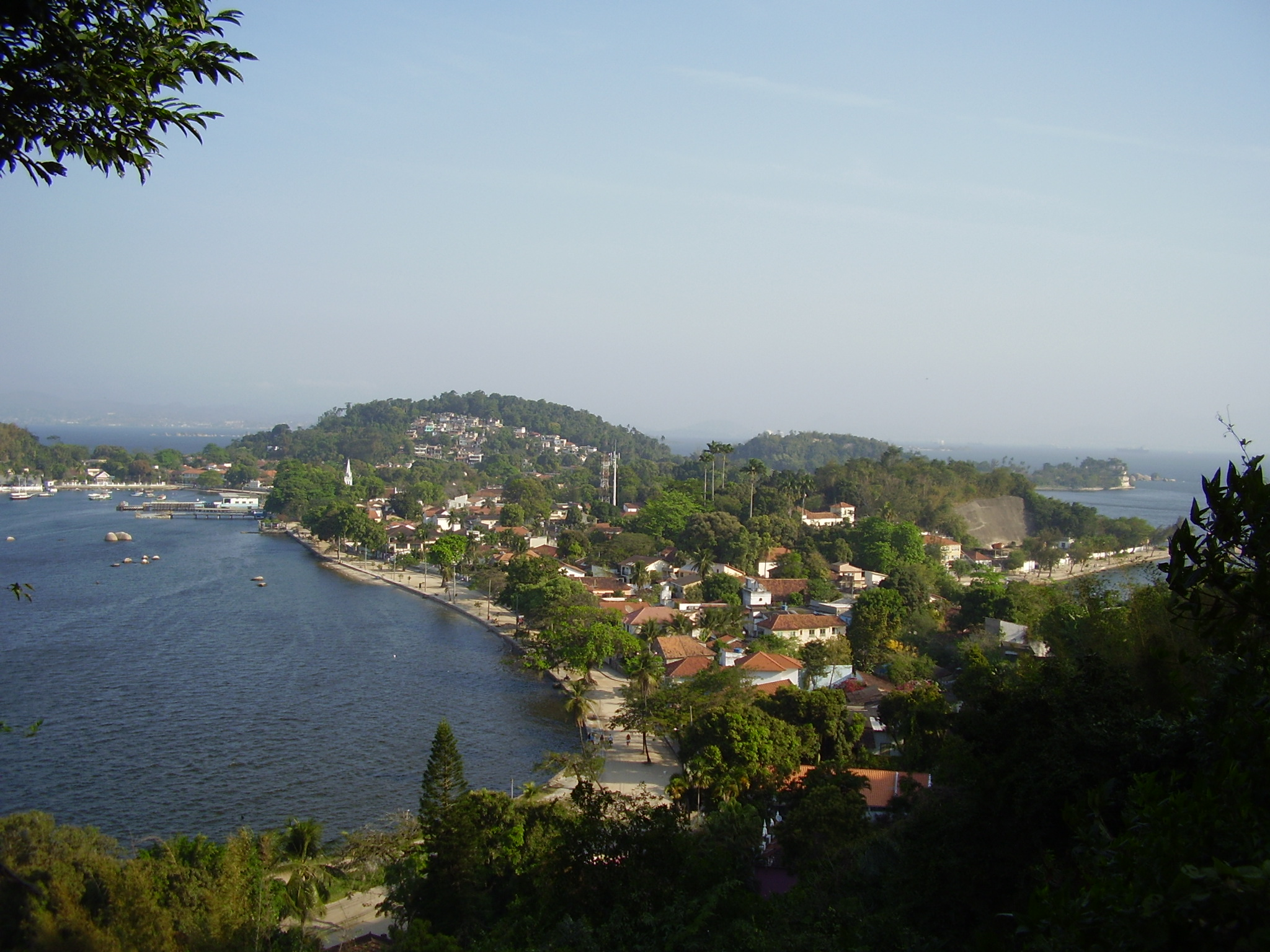
Aerial view of Paquetá Island

- Saint Roch (São Roque) Festival, in honor of the Island's patron saint, is held along the week or on the weekend nearest to August 16 when the mass for Saint Roque is celebrated.
- Saint Peter (São Pedro) Festival, in honor of the patron saint of fishermen who keep the traditional maritime procession on June 29.

== Notable residents ==
- Marcos Paquetá (born 1958) – former Brazilian footballer
- Matheus Paquetá (born 1995) – Brazilian footballer
- Lucas Paquetá (born 1997) – Brazilian footballer
