= Yago Santos =

Yago Santos may refer to:

- Yago dos Santos (born 1999), Brazilian basketball player
- Yago Santos (footballer) (born 2003), Brazilian football midfielder

== See also ==
- Yago (footballer, born 1995), born Yago Henrique Severino dos Santos, Brazilian football defensive midfielder
