= Tavinho =

Tavinho is a masculine name, often a short form of the given names Otávio or Octávio. Notable people with the name include:

- Tavinho (footballer, born 1993), a Portuguese footballer
- Tavinho (footballer, born 2004), a Brazilian footballer
