= Flávio (footballer, born 2000) =

Brazilian footballer

Personal information
- Full name: Luiz Flávio Silverio Silva
- Date of birth: 15 June 2000 (age 26)
- Place of birth: Salinas, Brazil
- Height: 1.80 m (5 ft 11 in)
- Position: Midfielder

Team information
- Current team: Figueirense
- Number: 35

Youth career
- 2017–2019: América Mineiro

Senior career*
| Years | Team | Apps | (Gls) |
| 2019–2024 | América Mineiro | 55 | (2) |
| 2021 | → Cruzeiro (loan) | 23 | (0) |
| 2023 | → Mirassol (loan) | 25 | (0) |
| 2025 | Inter de Limeira | 10 | (0) |
| 2025– | Figueirense | 21 | (0) |
- * Club domestic league appearances and goals as of 10 November 2026

Luiz Flávio Silverio Silva (born 15 June 2000), known as Flávio, is a Brazilian footballer who plays as a midfielder for Figueirense.

== Club career ==
Flávio was born in Salinas, Minas Gerais, and joined América Mineiro's youth setup in 2017. He made his first team debut on 25 August 2019; after coming on as a second-half substitute for Geovane, he scored a last-minute winner in a 3–2 Série B win over Guarani.

On 20 May 2021, Flávio moved to Cruzeiro on loan until the end of the year.

== Personal life ==
Flávio's twin brother Luiz Felipe is also a footballer and a midfielder. He finished his formation with Bahia.

== Career statistics ==
As of 10 February 2025

| Club | Season | League | | | State League | | Cup | | Continental | | Other | | Total | |
| Club | Season | Division | Apps | Goals | Apps | Goals | Apps | Goals | Apps | Goals | Apps | Goals | Apps | Goals |
|---|---|---|---|---|---|---|---|---|---|---|---|---|---|---|
| América Mineiro | 2019 | Série B | 14 | 2 | 0 | 0 | 0 | 0 | — | | — | | 14 | 2 |
| América Mineiro | 2020 | Série B | 14 | 0 | 6 | 0 | 4 | 0 | — | | — | | 24 | 0 |
| América Mineiro | 2021 | Série A | 0 | 0 | 5 | 0 | 2 | 0 | — | | — | | 7 | 0 |
| América Mineiro | 2022 | Série A | 2 | 0 | 4 | 0 | 1 | 0 | 1 (Note: Appearance(s) in Copa Libertadores) | 0 | — | | 8 | 0 |
| América Mineiro | 2024 | Série B | 2 | 0 | 0 | 0 | 0 | 0 | — | | — | | 2 | 0 |
| América Mineiro | Total | | 32 | 2 | 15 | 0 | 7 | 0 | 1 | 0 | — | | 55 | 2 |
| Cruzeiro (loan) | 2021 | Série B | 23 | 0 | — | | — | | — | | — | | 23 | 0 |
| Mirassol (loan) | 2023 | Série B | 11 | 0 | 9 | 0 | 0 | 0 | — | | 5 (Note: Appearance(s) in Copa Paulista) | 0 | 25 | 0 |
| Inter de Limeira | 2025 | Série D | 0 | 0 | 6 | 0 | — | | — | | — | | 6 | 0 |
| Career total | | | 66 | 2 | 30 | 0 | 7 | 0 | 1 | 0 | 5 | 0 | 109 | 2 |
