= Lucas Paquetá =

Brazilian footballer (born 1997)

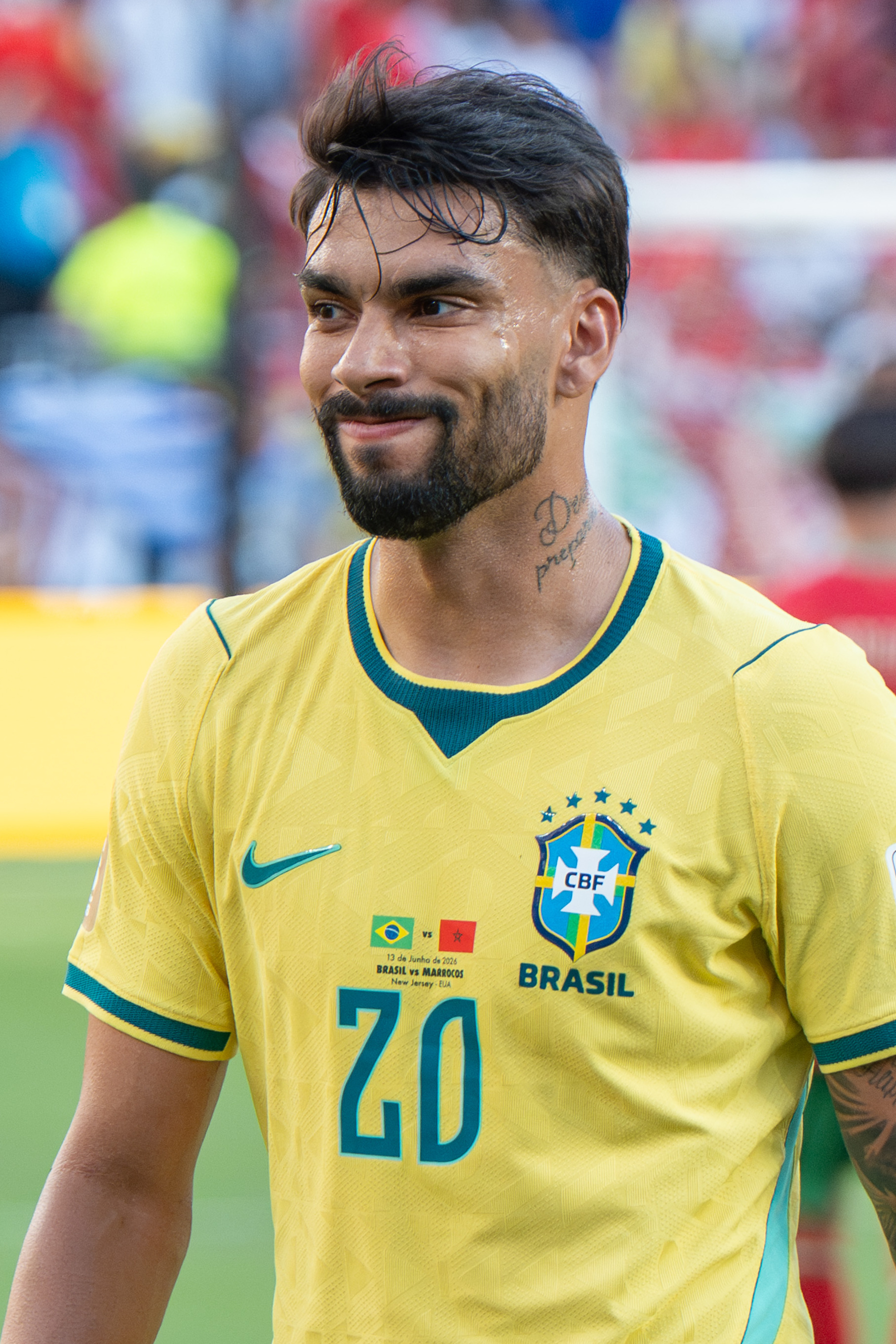
- Paquetá with Brazil in 2026

Personal information
- Full name: Lucas Tolentino Coelho de Lima
- Date of birth: 27 August 1997 (age 29)
- Place of birth: Rio de Janeiro, Brazil
- Height: 1.83 m (6 ft 0 in)
- Position: Attacking midfielder

Team information
- Current team: Flamengo
- Number: 11

Youth career
- 2007–2016: Flamengo

Senior career*
Years	Team	Apps	(Gls)
2016–2019	Flamengo	67	(15)
2019–2020	AC Milan	37	(1)
2020–2022	Lyon	67	(18)
2022–2026	West Ham United	110	(16)
2026–	Flamengo	30	(10)

International career^{‡}
2016–2017	Brazil U20	8	(1)
2018–	Brazil	67	(13)
Medal record
Men's football
Representing Brazil
Copa América
Winner	2019 Brazil
Runner-up	2021 Brazil
- * Club domestic league appearances and goals as of 23:28, 21 November 2026 (UTC) ‡ National team caps and goals as of 15:52, 30 June 2026 (UTC)

Lucas Tolentino Coelho de Lima (born 27 August 1997), better known as Lucas Paquetá (Brazilian Portuguese: [ˈlukas pakɛˈta]), is a Brazilian professional footballer who plays as an attacking midfielder for Campeonato Brasileiro Série A club Flamengo and the Brazil national team.

Paquetá began his career in 2007 with Brazilian side Flamengo, where he won the 2016 Copa São Paulo de Júniores title. After being promoted to the senior team in 2016, he moved to Europe in 2019 to join Italian giants AC Milan, where he played for two seasons. In 2020, he joined French club Lyon, where he was named in the UNFP Ligue 1 Team of the Year for 2020–21 and won the inaugural Best Foreign Player of the Season for 2021–22. In 2022, he signed for English side West Ham United for £50m with additional add-ons. He won the UEFA Europa Conference League in his debut season and was named in the competition's Team of the Season. He re-joined Flamengo in 2026.

Paquetá represented Brazil at the Copa América in 2019, 2021 and 2024, winning the 2019 tournament, and was also a part of their squad for the FIFA World Cup in 2022 and 2026.

== Club career ==
=== Early career ===
Lucas Paquetá arrived at Flamengo in 2007 at the age of 10. By 15, he was very technically skilled but did not have the physicality of other players his age (he was only 5 feet (150 cm) tall). By 18, however, he had grown 27 centimetres (11 in). With the Flamengo youth team he won the 2016 Copa São Paulo de Júniores title, the most important youth tournament in Brazil. Alongside other standout players Léo Duarte, Felipe Vizeu, and Ronaldo, Lucas was promoted to the club's professional team right after the competition.

=== Flamengo ===
In March 2016, Paquetá got promoted to Flamengo's professional team and signed a contract extension until 2020. On 5 March 2016, Lucas debuted as a starter in a 3–1 win over Bangu in a 2016 Rio de Janeiro State League match. Paquetá scored his first professional goal on 19 February 2017 in a 4–0 victory against Madureira at the Estádio Raulino de Oliveira in Volta Redonda.

Paquetá scored in both the 2017 Copa do Brasil final in a 1–1 draw against Cruzeiro at the Maracanã Stadium and in the 2017 Copa Sudamericana final against Independiente, also a 1–1 draw in the Maracanã. In both matches, Flamengo were defeated and were runners-up to their opponents in the competitions. In the Copa Sudamericana final, he was named the best Flamengo player in the match. He finished 2017 considered by fans to be, alongside Juan, the highlight of Flamengo.

In the 2018 Campeonato Carioca, Lucas Paquetá was chosen as the best left-winger of the tournament and was the only Flamengo player selected for the team of the tournament.

=== AC Milan ===
On 10 October 2018, news agencies across Brazil and Italy reported that a €35M deal had been made between AC Milan and Flamengo for the transfer of player, beating stiff competition from French club Paris Saint-Germain.

On 4 January 2019, the transfer was made official, with Milan announcing the player had signed a five-year contract. He chose to wear the shirt number 39. Because of his mother's Portuguese descent, he was eligible for registration as a European player.

Paquetá made his club debut on 12 January 2019, playing 85 minutes before being replaced by Fabio Borini as Milan beat Sampdoria 2–0 in extra time in the Coppa Italia. Four days later, Paquetá played in the 2018 Supercoppa Italiana, held at the King Abdullah Sports City in Jeddah, Saudi Arabia, where Juventus beat Milan 1–0. On 21 January 2019, Paquetá made his Serie A debut in a 2–0 win over Genoa at the Stadio Luigi Ferraris. Paquetá scored his first goal for Milan in 3–0 win against Cagliari, scoring the second goal. He dedicated his goal for the victims of a fire at his old club Flamengo, all members of the under-15 team.

=== Lyon ===
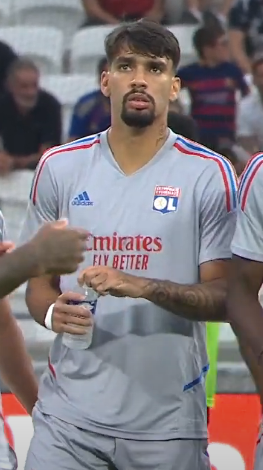
Paquetá with Lyon in 2022

On 30 September 2020, French club Lyon announced the signing of Paquetá, who signed for €20 million on a five-year contract.

In the 2021–22 season, Paquetá was elected the best foreign import of Ligue 1. The election was carried out by popular vote and was supported by more than 20,000 people. Paquetá, 25 years old, competed with the defender of PSG Marquinhos, the Ivorian midfielder of Lens Seko Fofana and the Canadian leader of Lille Jonathan David.

=== West Ham United ===
On 29 August 2022, West Ham announced the signing of Paquetá for a club record fee undisclosed by the club. He signed a five-year contract for a fee estimated by the BBC to be more than £50m with additional add-ons, beating the fee paid for Sebastien Haller in 2019.

Paquetá in 2023

He made his West Ham and Premier League debut on 31 August in a 1–1 home draw against Tottenham Hotspur. On 4 January 2023, Paquetá scored his first Premier League goal and West Ham goal against Leeds United at Elland Road in a 2–2 draw. On 7 June 2023, Paquetá assisted Jarrod Bowen's 90th minute winner in the 2023 UEFA Europa Conference League final in a 2–1 win against Fiorentina in Prague. A day later, Paquetá was named in UEFA's team of the season for the tournament.

=== Return to Flamengo ===
On 28 January 2026, Flamengo and West Ham United reached an agreement for the transfer of Paquetá, for a reported fee of £35.5 million (€41 million), setting a new record as the most expensive incoming signing in South American history. Two days later, Paquetá's transfer to Flamengo was confirmed. Paquetá said he rejected transfer interest from Tottenham Hotspur and Chelsea in order to return to Flamengo.

== International career ==
=== Under-20 ===
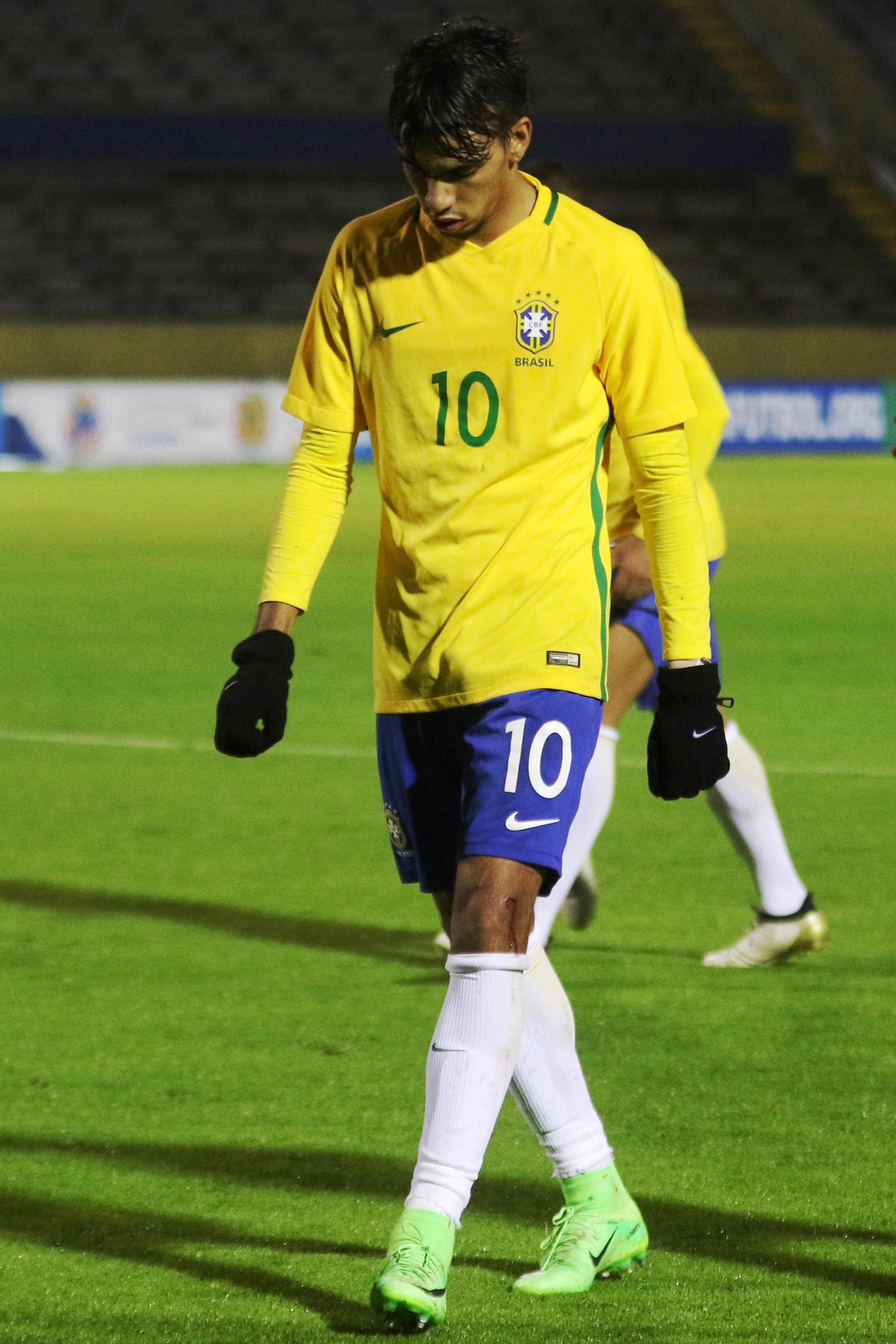
Paquetá playing for Brazil U20 in 2017

On 1 April 2016, Paquetá was called up for the first time to represent Brazil U20 in two friendly matches in Europe. He scored his first goal in his debut in a 2–1 win against England U20 on 4 September.

In October 2016, he was called up for the Quadrangular de Seleções tournament, a friendly round-robin against the U20 squads of Ecuador, Uruguay, and Chile.

=== Under-23 ===
When he was 18, Paquetá was called to practice with the Brazil U23 team in preparation for the 2016 Summer Olympics. Coach Rogério Micale called some younger players born in 1997 and 1998, including Lucas, to participate in group training in hopes of them eventually competing in the 2020 Summer Olympics in Tokyo.

He received his first official call-up to the under-23 team in March 2020.

=== Senior team ===
==== Early senior career ====
In 2018, Paquetá was selected to be one of the twelve alternatives for the Brazil national team by coach Tite for the 2018 FIFA World Cup in Russia. Of the 35 players on the 23-man roster and provisional roster, Paquetá was the youngest.

On 17 August 2018, Paquetá was called for the first time for the Brazil national team by manager Tite to play in friendly matches against United States and El Salvador in September. On 7 September, he debuted as a substitute to replace Philippe Coutinho in the 71st minute during a friendly match against the United States. On 23 March 2019, he scored his first goal in a 1–1 friendly draw against Panama, wearing Brazil's iconic No. 10 shirt. In May 2019, he was included in Brazil's 23-man squad for the 2019 Copa América.

==== 2021–2023 ====
In the 2021 Copa América quarter-final clash against Chile on 2 July 2021, he came on as a substitute at half-time and scored in the 47th minute to give Brazil a 1–0 victory. On 6 July 2021, he once again scored the only goal after an assist from Neymar in the semi-final against Peru. On 7 November 2022, Paquetá was named in the squad for the 2022 FIFA World Cup, where he scored a goal in the round of 16 game against South Korea.

In August 2023, after Paquetá was reported to be under investigation by both the FA and FIFA for breaches of betting rules, he was omitted from the squad for Brazil's 2026 FIFA World Cup qualifying games against Bolivia and Peru in September. Having been omitted from the squad for three international call-ups and missing six of Brazil's 2026 World Cup qualifiers, three of which they lost, Paquetá was recalled to the squad in March 2024 for upcoming friendlies against England and Spain.

== Personal life ==
Lucas has an older brother, Matheus, who also plays football. His nickname, Paquetá, refers to Paquetá Island and the eponymous neighborhood he grew up in; he is a big fan of funk carioca and sometimes imitates funk dance steps during his goal celebrations. He is married to Maria Eduarda Fournier, with whom he has two sons. He is a Christian.

On 18 August 2023, an investigation into potential betting breaches by Paquetá was started. Following this, on 23 May 2024, he was charged with misconduct for alleged breaches of FA Rules E5 and F3. He faced four breaches of FA Rule E5.1 for his conduct during Premier League fixtures against Leicester City on 12 November 2022, Aston Villa on 12 March 2023, Leeds United on 21 May 2023, and Bournemouth on 12 August 2023, where it was alleged that he intentionally sought to receive a card from the referee to influence the betting market for personal profit. Additionally, Paquetá was charged with two breaches of FA Rule F3 related to failures to comply with FA Rule F2. Paquetá denied the charges and said he was "extremely surprised and upset" to be charged. In July 2025, Paquetá was cleared of the charges against him after a regulatory commission found the four charges to be "not proven" following a hearing.

== Career statistics ==
=== Club ===
As of match played 21 November 2026

Appearances and goals by club, season and competition
Club	Season	League			National cup (Note: Includes Copa do Brasil, Copa del Rey, Coupe de France, FA Cup)		League cup (Note: Includes EFL Cup)		Continental		Other		Total	
Club	Season	Division	Apps	Goals	Apps	Goals	Apps	Goals	Apps	Goals	Apps	Goals	Apps	Goals
Flamengo	2016	Série A	0	0	0	0	–		–		2 (Note: One appearance in Campeonato Carioca, one appearance in Primeira Liga)	0	2	0
Flamengo	2017	Série A	17	1	3	1	–		9 (Note: Appearances in Copa Sudamericana)	2	8 (Note: Six appearances and two goals in Campeonato Carioca, two appearances in Primeira Liga)	2	37	6
Flamengo	2018	Série A	32	10	6	0	–		7 (Note: Appearances in Copa Libertadores)	0	11 (Note: Appearances in Campeonato Carioca)	2	56	12
Flamengo	Total		49	11	9	1	–		16	2	21	4	95	18
AC Milan	2018–19	Serie A	13	1	3	0	–		0	0	1 (Note: Appearance in Supercoppa Italiana)	0	17	1
AC Milan	2019–20	Serie A	24	0	3	0	–		–		–		27	0
AC Milan	Total		37	1	6	0	–		0	0	1	0	44	1
Lyon	2020–21	Ligue 1	30	9	4	1	–		–		–		34	10
Lyon	2021–22	Ligue 1	35	9	0	0	–		9 (Note: Appearances in UEFA Europa League)	2	–		44	11
Lyon	2022–23	Ligue 1	2	0	–		–		–		–		2	0
Lyon	Total		67	18	4	1	–		9	2	–		80	21
West Ham United	2022–23	Premier League	28	4	2	0	0	0	11 (Note: Appearances in UEFA Europa Conference League)	1	–		41	5
West Ham United	2023–24	Premier League	31	4	1	0	2	0	9	4	–		43	8
West Ham United	2024–25	Premier League	33	4	1	1	2	0	–		–		36	5
West Ham United	2025–26	Premier League	18	4	0	0	1	1	–		–		19	5
West Ham United	Total		110	16	4	1	5	1	20	5	–		139	23
Flamengo	2026	Série A	25	7	0	0	–		10	3	8 (Note: One appearance in Supercopa do Brasil, five appearances and three goals in Campeonato Carioca, two appearances in Recopa Sudamericana)	3	43	13
Career total			288	53	23	3	5	1	55	12	30	7	401	76

=== International ===
As of match played 29 June 2026

Appearances and goals by national team and year
National team	Year	Apps	Goals
Brazil	2018	2	0
Brazil	2019	9	2
Brazil	2020	2	0
Brazil	2021	15	4
Brazil	2022	11	2
Brazil	2023	3	1
Brazil	2024	13	2
Brazil	2025	6	1
Brazil	2026	6	1
Total		67	13

Scores and results list Brazil's goal tally first, score column indicates score after each Paquetá goal.

List of international goals scored by Lucas Paquetá
No.	Date	Venue	Cap	Opponent	Score	Result	Competition
1	23 March 2019	Estádio do Dragão, Porto, Portugal	3	Panama	1–0	1–1	Friendly
2	19 November 2019	Mohammed bin Zayed Stadium, Abu Dhabi, United Arab Emirates	11	South Korea	1–0	3–0	Friendly
3	8 June 2021	Estadio Defensores del Chaco, Asunción, Paraguay	15	Paraguay	2–0	2–0	2022 FIFA World Cup qualification
4	2 July 2021	Estádio Olímpico Nilton Santos, Rio de Janeiro, Brazil	19	Chile	1–0	1–0	2021 Copa América
5	5 July 2021	Estádio Olímpico Nilton Santos, Rio de Janeiro, Brazil	20	Peru	1–0	1–0	2021 Copa América
6	11 November 2021	Neo Quimica Arena, São Paulo, Brazil	27	Colombia	1–0	1–0	2022 FIFA World Cup qualification
7	29 March 2022	Estadio Hernando Siles, La Paz, Bolivia	31	Bolivia	1–0	4–0	2022 FIFA World Cup qualification
8	5 December 2022	Stadium 974, Doha, Qatar	38	South Korea	4–0	4–1	2022 FIFA World Cup
9	20 June 2023	Estádio José Alvalade, Lisbon, Portugal	42	Senegal	1–0	2–4	Friendly
10	26 March 2024	Santiago Bernabéu, Madrid, Spain	44	Spain	3–3	3–3	Friendly
11	28 June 2024	Allegiant Stadium, Las Vegas, United States	48	Paraguay	4–1	4–1	2024 Copa América
12	4 September 2025	Estádio do Maracanã, Rio de Janeiro, Brazil	56	Chile	2–0	3–0	2026 FIFA World Cup qualification
13	31 May 2026	Estádio do Maracanã, Rio de Janeiro, Brazil	62	Panama	4–1	6–2	Friendly

== Honours ==
Flamengo

- Campeonato Brasileiro Série A: 2026
- Campeonato Carioca: 2017, 2026
- Copa do Brasil runner-up: 2017
- Copa Sudamericana runner-up: 2017

West Ham United

- UEFA Europa Conference League: 2022–23

Brazil

- Copa América: 2019; runner-up: 2021

Individual

- Bola de Prata: 2018
- Best Attacking Midfielder in Brazil: 2018
- Campeonato Brasileiro Série A Team of the Year: 2018
- Campeonato Carioca Team of the Year: 2018
- UNFP Ligue 1 Team of the Year: 2020–21
- UNFP Ligue 1 Player of the Month: October 2021
- UEFA Conference League Team of the Season: 2022–23
