= Douglas Silva (footballer, born 1999) =

Brazilian footballer

Personal information
- Full name: Douglas da Silva Santos
- Date of birth: 25 August 1999 (age 27)
- Place of birth: Arcoverde, Brazil
- Height: 1.71 m (5 ft 7 in)
- Position: Right back

Team information
- Current team: Athletic
- Number: 2

Youth career
- 2018–2019: Flamengo de Arcoverde
- 2018: → Tuna Luso (loan)
- 2019: Sete de Setembro

Senior career*
Years	Team	Apps	(Gls)
2020–2021	Sete de Setembro	20	(0)
2021–2023	Boa Esporte	15	(0)
2021	→ Uberaba (loan)	11	(0)
2022	→ Iporá (loan)	13	(2)
2022	→ Goiás (loan)	2	(0)
2023	→ Athletic (loan)	8	(1)
2023–	Athletic	109	(6)
- * Club domestic league appearances and goals as of 18 November 2026

Douglas da Silva Santos (born 25 August 1999), known as Douglas Silva, Douglas Pelé or just Douglas, is a Brazilian footballer who plays as a right back for Athletic.

== Club career ==
Born in Arcoverde, Pernambuco, Douglas began his career with hometown side Flamengo de Arcoverde. After a stint at Tuna Luso, he moved to Sete de Setembro in 2019, initially for the under-20 squad.

After making his senior debut with Sete in 2020, Douglas joined Boa Esporte on 25 May 2021. On 27 September, he was announced at Uberaba on loan, and helped the side to win the Campeonato Mineiro Segunda Divisão.

After returning to Boa on 22 December 2021, Douglas was loaned to Iporá the following 19 January. On 4 April 2022, he moved to Série A side Goiás on loan until the end of the year.

Douglas made his top tier debut on 23 October 2022, starting in a 2–1 away win over Cuiabá.

== Career statistics ==
As of 24 October 2022

Club	Season	League			State League		Cup		Continental		Other		Total	
Club	Season	Division	Apps	Goals	Apps	Goals	Apps	Goals	Apps	Goals	Apps	Goals	Apps	Goals
Sete de Setembro	2020	Pernambucano Série A2	—		9	0	—		—		—		9	0
Sete de Setembro	2021	Pernambucano	—		11	0	—		—		—		11	0
Sete de Setembro	Total		—		20	0	—		—		—		20	0
Boa Esporte	2021	Série D	15	0	—		—		—		—		15	0
Uberaba	2021	Mineiro 2ª Divisão	—		11	0	—		—		—		11	0
Iporá	2022	Série D	0	0	13	2	—		—		—		13	2
Goiás	2022	Série A	1	0	—		0	0	—		—		1	0
Career total			16	0	44	2	0	0	0	0	0	0	60	2

== Honours ==
Uberaba

- Campeonato Mineiro Segunda Divisão: 2021
