= Gustavão =

Brazilian footballer (born 2005)

Personal information
- Full name: Gustavo Silva Vieira Nascimento
- Date of birth: 4 January 2005 (age 21)
- Place of birth: Pirapora, Brazil
- Height: 1.90 m (6 ft 3 in)
- Position: Forward

Team information
- Current team: Athletic-MG
- Number: 9

Youth career
- América Mineiro
- 2022: Atlético Mineiro
- 2022–2024: Athletic-MG

Senior career*
Years	Team	Apps	(Gls)
2024–	Athletic-MG	17	(4)
2025–2026	→ Oliveirense (loan)	16	(0)
- * Club domestic league appearances and goals as of 18 November 2026

Gustavo Silva Vieira Nascimento (born 4 January 2005), commonly known as Gustavão, is a Brazilian footballer who plays as a forward for Série B club Athletic-MG.

== Career ==
Born in Pirapora, Minas Gerais, Gustavão played for the youth sides of América Mineiro and Atlético Mineiro before joining Athletic-MG in 2022, initially for the under-17 team. He made his first team debut with the latter on 17 August 2024, coming on as a late substitute for goalscorer Denilson in a 3–1 Série C away win over Floresta.

Gustavão began the 2025 season by scoring twice in a 4–1 friendly win over Santos, and scored his first professional goals on 30 January of that year, scoring a brace in a 6–1 Campeonato Mineiro home routing of Villa Nova. He finished the 2025 Campeonato Mineiro as the club's top scorer with three goals, despite not being a starter.

On 21 July 2025, Gustavão and Athletic teammate João Adriano were loaned to Liga Portugal 2 side Oliveirense, for one year.

== Career statistics ==
As of 16 November 2025

Appearances and goals by club, season and competition
Club	Season	League			State League		Cup		Continental		Other		Total	
Club	Season	Division	Apps	Goals	Apps	Goals	Apps	Goals	Apps	Goals	Apps	Goals	Apps	Goals
Athletic-MG	2024	Série C	1	0	—		—		—		—		1	0
Athletic-MG	2025	Série B	5	0	8	3	0	0	—		—		13	3
Athletic-MG	Total		6	0	8	3	0	0	—		—		14	3
Oliveirense (loan)	2025–26	Liga Portugal 2	7	0	—		1	0	—		—		8	0
Career total			13	0	8	3	1	0	0	0	0	0	22	3
