= Estádio Ítalo Mário Limongi =

Soccer stadium in Rio Claro, São Paulo, Brazil

Ítalo Mário Limongi
- Gigante da Vila Industrial
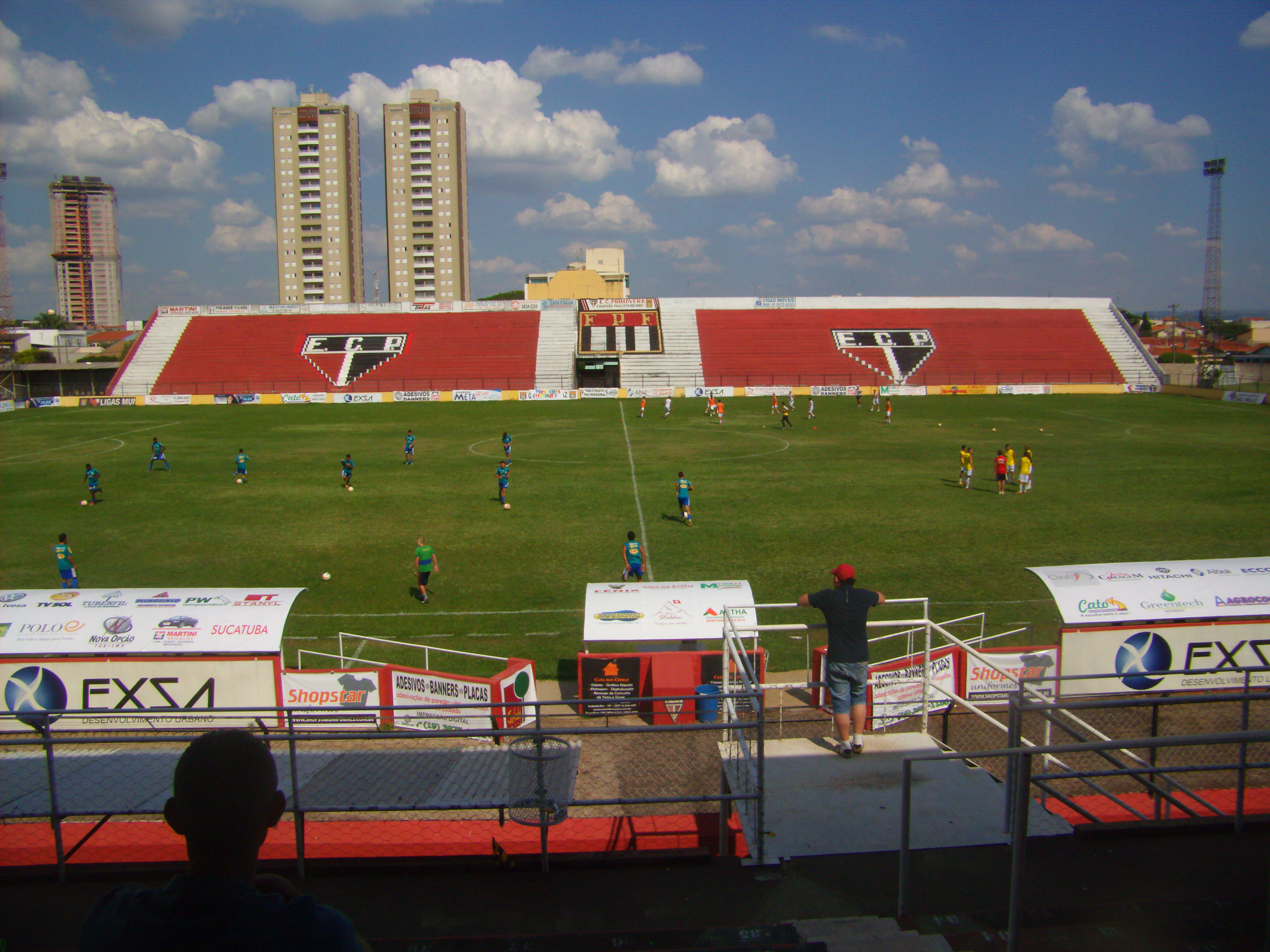
- Interactive map of Ítalo Mário Limongi
- Full name: Estádio Ítalo Mário Limongi
- Former names: Estádio Gigante da Vila Industrial (1961–1990)
- Location: Rua José Escodro, 107, Indaiatuba, SP, Brazil
- Coordinates: 23.088463845644814°S 47.20472212698191°W
- Owner: Primavera
- Operator: Primavera
- Capacity: 7,820
- Surface: Natural grass
- Record attendance: 6,761 (Primavera vs Taubaté, 29 March 2025)
- Field size: 105 by 66 metres (114.8 yd × 72.2 yd)

Construction
- Groundbreaking: 1961
- Opened: 29 June 1961
- Renovated: 2021, 2025

Tenant
- Primavera

Estádio Ítalo Mário Limongi, sometimes known as Gigante da Vila Industrial, is a multi-use stadium in Indaiatuba, São Paulo, Brazil. It is used mostly for football matches, and has a maximum capacity of 7,820 people.

== History ==
Inaugurated on 29 June 1961, the stadium was initially named Estádio Gigante da Vila Industrial and hosted a match between Primavera and Jabaquara, which ended 2–2. In 1990, the stadium was renamed Ítalo Mário Limongi as an honour to the club's late former president.

In 2021, the stadium received improvements in their grass. In 2025, after the club's first-ever promotion to the Campeonato Paulista, renovations began to increase the stadium's capacity to 10,000 people.
