= Pedro Barcelos =

Brazilian footballer

Personal information
- Full name: Pedro Henrique Barcelos Silva
- Date of birth: 19 January 1996 (age 30)
- Place of birth: Galileia, Brazil
- Height: 1.88 m (6 ft 2 in)
- Position: Centre-back

Team information
- Current team: Académico de Viseu
- Number: 5

Youth career
- Vasco da Gama Vidigueira

Senior career*
Years	Team	Apps	(Gls)
2015–2016	Vasco da Gama Vidigueira	15	(1)
2016–2017	Sporting Viana do Alentejo	19	(0)
2017–2019	Cova da Piedade B		
2019–2021	Louletano	25	(1)
2021–2024	Mafra	89	(2)
2024–2025	América Mineiro	8	(0)
2025–	Académico de Viseu	26	(0)
- * Club domestic league appearances and goals as of 19 June 2026

Pedro Henrique Barcelos Silva (born 19 January 1996), known as Pedro Barcelos, is a Brazilian footballer who plays as a centre-back for Primeira Liga club Académico de Viseu.

== Career ==
Born in Galileia, Minas Gerais, Barcelos moved to Portugal at early age, and was a youth product of Vasco da Gama Vidigueira. After making his senior debut in the 2015–16 season, he moved to Sporting de Viana do Alentejo in the Campeonato de Portugal.

In 2017, Barcelos signed for Cova da Piedade, but only featured for their B-team during his two-year spell at the club. On 7 August 2019, he joined Louletano in the third tier.

On 22 January 2021, Barcelos was announced at Liga Portugal 2 side Mafra on an 18-month contract. He made his professional debut on 2 February, starting in a 1–1 home draw against former side Cova da Piedade.

Barcelos immediately became a regular starter, and scored his first professional goal on 22 August 2021, netting the opener in a 3–1 away win over Académico de Viseu. On 29 January 2024, he left the club to return to his home country, after agreeing to a transfer to Série B side América Mineiro.

On 8 July 2025, Barcelos returned to Portugal and signed a two-season contract with Académico de Viseu.

== Career statistics ==
As of 8 February 2024

Appearances and goals by club, season and competition
Club	Season	League			State league		Cup		Continental		Other		Total	
Club	Season	Division	Apps	Goals	Apps	Goals	Apps	Goals	Apps	Goals	Apps	Goals	Apps	Goals
Vasco da Gama Vidigueira	2015–16	AF Beja 1ª Divisão	15	1	—		1	0	—		—		16	1
Sporting de Viana do Alentejo	2016–17	Campeonato de Portugal	19	0	—		0	0	—		—		19	0
Louletano	2019–20	Campeonato de Portugal	17	0	—		1	0	—		—		18	0
Louletano	2020–21	Campeonato de Portugal	8	1	—		1	0	—		—		9	1
Louletano	Total		25	1	—		2	0	—		—		27	1
Mafra	2020–21	Liga Portugal 2	16	0	—		—		—		—		16	0
Mafra	2021–22	Liga Portugal 2	30	2	—		6	1	—		2 (Note: Appearance(s) in Taça da Liga)	0	38	3
Mafra	2022–23	Liga Portugal 2	27	0	—		2	0	—		3	0	32	0
Mafra	2023–24	Liga Portugal 2	16	0	—		2	0	—		1	0	19	0
Mafra	Total		89	2	—		10	1	—		6	0	105	3
América Mineiro	2024	Série B	0	0	0	0	0	0	—		—		0	0
Career total			148	4	0	0	13	1	0	0	6	0	167	5
