= Luiz Fernando (footballer, born 1999) =

Brazilian footballer

Personal information
- Full name: Luiz Fernando Ferreira de Souza
- Date of birth: 11 July 1999 (age 27)
- Place of birth: Florianópolis, Brazil
- Height: 1.74 m (5 ft 9 in)
- Position: Forward

Team information
- Current team: Primavera (on loan from Tombense)

Youth career
- –2018: Figueirense
- 2018: Tombense

Senior career*
Years	Team	Apps	(Gls)
2018–	Tombense	17	(0)
2019–2020	→ Athletico Paranaense (loan)	1	(0)
2021	→ América Mineiro (loan)	0	(0)
2022	→ Ponte Preta (loan)	6	(0)
2023–	→ Primavera (loan)	0	(0)
- * Club domestic league appearances and goals as of 3 September 2023

Luiz Fernando Ferreira de Souza (born 11 July 1999), known as Luiz Fernando, is a Brazilian footballer who plays as a forward for Primavera on loan from Tombense.

He was included in The Guardian's "Next Generation 2016".

== Career statistics ==
As of 3 February 2022.

Club	Season	League			State League		Cup		Continental		Other		Total	
Club	Season	Division	Apps	Goals	Apps	Goals	Apps	Goals	Apps	Goals	Apps	Goals	Apps	Goals
Tombense	2018	Série C	0	0	1 (Note: Appearances in the Campeonato Mineiro)	0	—		—		—		1	0
Athletico Paranaense (loan)	2019	Série A	0	0	1 (Note: Appearances in the Campeonato Paranaense)	0	0	0	—		—		1	0
Athletico Paranaense (loan)	2020	Série A	0	0	0	0	0	0	—		—		0	0
Athletico Paranaense (loan)	Total		0	0	1	0	0	0	—		—		1	0
América Mineiro (loan)	2021	Série A	0	0	0	0	0	0	—		—		0	0
Ponte Preta (loan)	2022	Série B	0	0	3	0	0	0	—		—		3	0
Career total			0	0	5	0	0	0	0	0	0	0	5	0
