= Wesley Augusto Henn Marth =

Brazilian footballer (born 2000)

Wesley
Personal information
- Full name: Wesley Augusto Henn Marth
- Date of birth: 5 March 2000 (age 26)
- Place of birth: Santa Cruz do Sul, Brazil
- Height: 1.90 m (6 ft 3 in)
- Position: Defender

Team information
- Current team: América Mineiro (on loan from Tombense)
- Number: 43

Youth career
- –2019: Figueirense
- 2020: Athletico Paranaense
- 2020: Grêmio

Senior career*
Years	Team	Apps	(Gls)
2019	Figueirense	2	(0)
2021–	Tombense	50	(2)
2021–2022	→ Porto B (loan)	3	(0)
2026–	→ América Mineiro (loan)	0	(0)
- * Club domestic league appearances and goals as of 16 April 2026

Wesley Augusto Henn Marth (born 5 March 2000), commonly known as Wesley, is a Brazilian footballer who plays for América Mineiro, on loan from Tombense.

== Career statistics ==
=== Club ===
As of 10 August 2021.

Club	Season	League			State League		Cup		Other		Total	
Club	Season	Division	Apps	Goals	Apps	Goals	Apps	Goals	Apps	Goals	Apps	Goals
Figueirense	2019	Série B	0	0	2 (Note: Appearances in the Campeonato Catarinense)	0	0	0	0	0	2	0
Tombense	2021	Série C	8	0	11 (Note: Appearances in the Campeonato Mineiro)	0	1 (Note: Appearances in the Copa do Brasil)	0	0	0	20	0
Porto B (loan)	2021–22	Liga Portugal 2	0	0	–		–		0	0	0	0
Career total			8	0	13	0	1	0	0	0	22	0
