= Kevin (footballer, born 1997) =

Brazilian footballer

Personal information
- Full name: Kevin Peterson dos Santos Silva
- Date of birth: 7 September 1997 (age 29)
- Place of birth: Teresina, Brazil
- Height: 1.74 m (5 ft 8 1/2 in)
- Position: Right back

Team information
- Current team: CRB (on loan from Primavera)
- Number: 2

Youth career
- 2014–2015: Mirassol
- 2015: Avaí
- 2015–2017: Tombense
- 2015–2017: → Cruzeiro (loan)

Senior career*
Years	Team	Apps	(Gls)
2014–2015	Mirassol	13	(0)
2015	Avaí	0	(0)
2015–2025	Tombense	30	(0)
2015–2017	→ Cruzeiro (loan)	0	(0)
2017–2018	→ Guarani (loan)	44	(0)
2019	→ Goiás (loan)	15	(0)
2020	→ Grêmio (loan)	0	(0)
2020–2021	→ Botafogo (loan)	34	(0)
2021–2022	→ Ponte Preta (loan)	33	(0)
2022	→ Avaí (loan)	32	(2)
2024	→ Avaí (loan)	14	(0)
2025	→ Ferroviária (loan)	17	(0)
2026–	Primavera	7	(0)
2026–	→ CRB (loan)	22	(1)
- * Club domestic league appearances and goals as of 16 November 2026

Kevin Peterson dos Santos Silva (born 7 September 1997), simply known as Kevin, is a Brazilian footballer who plays as a right back for CRB, on loan from Primavera.

== Playing career ==
After being noticed by a scout, he was brought to a trial at Mirassol, where he was signed and after playing in a U17 tournament with the team was signed to his first professional contract.

In 2015, he joined Avaí, playing in their youth system.

Soon after, he was acquired by Tombense, who sent him on a series of loans over the next years.

First, he was loaned to Cruzeiro, where he stayed for two years, playing in their youth system.

From 2017 to 2018, he was on loan with Guarani. With Guarani, he won the Paulista Serie A2.

In January 2019, he went on loan with Goiás, on the recommendation of coach Maurício Barbieri.

In 2020, he went on loan to Grêmio, on a five month loan with the possibility of an extension for another year. He immediately joined the U23 side. At the end of the five-month loan, the option to extend was not picked up due to the interruption of the season due to the COVID-19 pandemic and the fact that he had aged out of the U23 side.

In July 2020, he joined Botafogo on loan through 2021.

On 31 May 2021, he joined Ponte Preta on loan.

In April 2022, he moved to Avaí on loan. He scored his first professional goal on 13 June 2022, in a 1-0 victory over Botafogo.

== Career statistics ==
As of 23 September 2023

Club	Season	League			State League		Cup		Continental		Other		Total	
Club	Season	Division	Apps	Goals	Apps	Goals	Apps	Goals	Apps	Goals	Apps	Goals	Apps	Goals
Mirassol	2014	Paulista A2	—		—		—		—		11 (Note: All appearance(s) in Copa Paulista)	0	11	0
Mirassol	2015	Paulista A2	—		13	0	—		—		—		13	0
Mirassol	Subtotal		—		13	0	—		—		11	0	24	0
Avaí	2015	Série A	0	0	—		—		—		—		0	0
Tombense	2015	—	—		—		—		—		—		0	0
Tombense	2023	Série B	17	0	4	0	3	0	—		—		24	0
Tombense	Subtotal		17	0	4	0	3	0	—		—		24	0
Cruzeiro (loan)	2016	Série A	0	0	0	0	0	0	—		—		0	0
Guarani (loan)	2017	Série B	11	0	—		—		—		—		11	0
Guarani (loan)	2018	Série B	30	0	3	0	—		—		—		33	0
Guarani (loan)	Subtotal		41	0	3	0	—		—		—		44	0
Grêmio (loan)	2019	Série A	—		—		—		—		—		0	0
Goiás (loan)	2019	Série A	4	0	11	0	2	0	—		4 (Note: All appearance(s) in Copa Verde)	0	21	0
Botafogo (loan)	2020	Série A	33	0	—		5	0	—		—		38	0
Botafogo (loan)	2021	Carioca A	—		1	0	—		—		—		1	0
Botafogo (loan)	Subtotal		33	0	1	0	5	0	—		—		39	0
Ponte Preta (loan)	2021	Série B	24	0	—		—		—		—		24	0
Ponte Preta (loan)	2022	Paulista A1	—		9	0	1	0	—		—		9	0
Ponte Preta (loan)	Subtotal		24	0	9	0	1	0	—		—		33	0
Avaí (loan)	2022	Série A	32	2	—		—		—		—		32	2
Career total			151	2	41	0	11	0	0	0	15	0	218	2
