= Athletic Club (MG) =

Brazilian association football club based in São João del-Rei, Minas Gerais, Brazil

Athletic
- Full name: Athletic Club
- Nickname: Esquadrão de Aço (Steel Squadron)
- Founded: 27 June 1909; 117 years ago
- Ground: Estádio Joaquim Portugal
- Capacity: 4,655
- President: Xandão Soares
- Head coach: Alex
- League: Campeonato Brasileiro Série B Campeonato Mineiro
- 2025 2025: Série B, 15th of 20; Mineiro, 5th of 12
- Website: https://athleticclub.com.br/
Home colors	Away colors	Third colors

Athletic Club, commonly referred to as Athletic, is a Brazilian professional club based in São João del-Rei, Minas Gerais founded on 27 June 1909. It competes in the Campeonato Brasileiro Série B, the second tier of Brazilian football, as well as in the Campeonato Mineiro, the top flight of the Minas Gerais state football league.

Athletic is the only club in the Intermediate Geographic Region of Barbacena competing in the First Division of the Campeonato Mineiro. Since returning to professional football as a SAF, Athletic had a meteoric ascension and currently plays at the Campeonato Brasileiro Série B. Brazilians pronounce it stressing the last syllable: Athletic.

== History ==
The club was founded on 27 June 1909. Its foundation had no relation with the team Atlético Mineiro from Belo Horizonte, which has a similar name and colour.

=== Return to professional football (2018–present) ===
==== 2018 ====
After 50 years out of professional football, the club returned in 2018. It disputed the Campeonato Mineiro Segunda Divisão, equivalent of the third division of the Campeonato Mineiro. The team qualified third in the first round. In the semifinals, it eliminated Valeriodoce, and gained access to the 2019 Campeonato Mineiro Módulo II. Athletic ended in second place, after losing the final on penalties to Coimbra Sports.

==== 2019 ====
In 2019, Athletic participated in the Mineiro Módulo II, finishing in seventh place and remaining in the competition.

==== 2020 ====
In 2020, the team finished the qualifying round of the Módulo II in second place, qualifying for the final quadrangular. In the final stage, it finished again in the vice-leadership, winning the vice-championship of Module II and being promoted to the Campeonato Mineiro.

==== 2021 ====
The club took part in the 2021 Campeonato Mineiro for the first time ever and attracted media attention after signing Uruguayan player Loco Abreu.

It ended up being defeated by URT in Patos de Minas at the semifinals of Troféu Inconfidência.

==== 2022 ====
In 2022 Campeonato Mineiro, the team was the best in the state outside the capital, Belo Horizonte, therefore winning the title Campeão Mineiro do Interior for the first time.

==== 2023 ====
The team won the Recopa Mineira in January by defeating Esporte Clube Democrata. In the 2023 Campeonato Mineiro, the team again was the best in the state outside the capital, Belo Horizonte, therefore winning the title Campeão Mineiro do Interior a second time.

At the semifinal, it was eliminated by Atlético. The team was defeated by Brasiliense at 2023 Copa do Brasil and kicked from the tournament. Athletic also played a friendly match against Vasco da Gama on 31 March, winning 2–0.

Athletic also played in the 2023 Campeonato Brasileiro Série D, achieving promotion to the Série C.

==== 2024 ====
In the 2024 Campeonato Mineiro, the club finished second of their group, and won the Troféu Inconfidência. They were again eliminated in the second phase of the 2024 Copa do Brasil, and achieved a first-ever promotion to the Série B after reaching the final stages of the 2024 Campeonato Brasileiro Série C.

== Players ==
=== Current squad ===
As of 3 September 2026

Note: Flags indicate national team as defined under FIFA eligibility rules; some limited exceptions apply. Players may hold more than one non-FIFA nationality.

No.	Pos.	Nation	Player
—	GK	BRA	Eduardo Freire
—	GK	BRA	Glauco
—	GK	BRA	Luan Polli
—	GK	BRA	Tony Batista
—	DF	BRA	Jhonatan Silva
—	DF	COL	Jhan Pool Torres (on loan from Operário Ferroviário)
—	DF	BRA	Lucas Belezi
—	DF	BRA	Philipe Sampaio
—	DF	BRA	Sidimar
—	DF	BRA	Diogo Batista
—	DF	BRA	Douglas Pelé
—	DF	BRA	Enzo Santos (on loan from CSA)
—	DF	BRA	Felipe Vieira
—	DF	BRA	Marcelo Henrique (on loan from Cuiabá)
—	DF	BRA	Zeca
—	MF	BRA	Alexandre Pena (on loan from Red Bull Bragantino)
—	MF	BRA	Felipe Negrucci (on loan from São Paulo)
—	MF	BRA	Fabrício Isidoro

No.	Pos.	Nation	Player
—	MF	BRA	Yago Santos
—	MF	BRA	Assis (on loan from Atlético Goianiense)
—	MF	COL	Gian Cabezas
—	MF	BRA	Gustavinho
—	MF	BRA	João Miguel (on loan from Barra-SC)
—	MF	BRA	Jota
—	MF	BRA	Kauan Lindes (on loan from Botafogo)
—	MF	BRA	Kauan Rodrigues (on loan from Fortaleza)
—	MF	BRA	Pedro Oliveira (on loan from Tombense)
—	FW	BRA	Bruninho (on loan from Santa Catarina)
—	FW	BRA	Yarlen
—	FW	ECU	Dixon Vera
—	FW	BRA	Carlinhos (on loan from Flamengo)
—	FW	BRA	Max
—	FW	COL	Wilinton Aponzá
—	FW	POR	Ronaldo Tavares
—	FW	BRA	Gustavão

=== Youth team ===
Note: Flags indicate national team as defined under FIFA eligibility rules; some limited exceptions apply. Players may hold more than one non-FIFA nationality.

No.	Pos.	Nation	Player
—	DF	BRA	Samuca
—	MF	BRA	Bruno Xavier
—	MF	BRA	Caick

No.	Pos.	Nation	Player
—	MF	BRA	João Oliveira
—	MF	BRA	Samuel
—	FW	BRA	Gabriel Carioca

=== Out on loan ===
Note: Flags indicate national team as defined under FIFA eligibility rules; some limited exceptions apply. Players may hold more than one non-FIFA nationality.

No.	Pos.	Nation	Player
—	FW	BRA	Cauã (at Democrata until 1 December 2026)

== Honours ==
=== Official tournaments ===
State
Competitions	Titles	Seasons
Recopa Mineira	1	2022

=== Others tournaments ===
==== State ====
- Campeonato Mineiro do Interior (2): 2022, 2023
- Troféu Inconfidência (2): 2024, 2025

==== State Regional ====
- Liga Sportiva Oeste de Minas (3): 1937, 1938, 1939

==== City ====
- Campeonato Citadino de São João del-Rei (26): 1946, 1947, 1949, 1950, 1952, 1954, 1960, 1961, 1962, 1963, 1965, 1968, 1971, 1973, 1974, 1976, 1978, 1981, 1982, 1983, 1984, 1985, 1986, 1993, 1997, 2009

=== Runners-up ===
- Campeonato Brasileiro Série C (1): 2024
- Campeonato Mineiro Módulo II (1): 2020
- Campeonato Mineiro Segunda Divisão (2): 1969, 2018

== Stadium ==
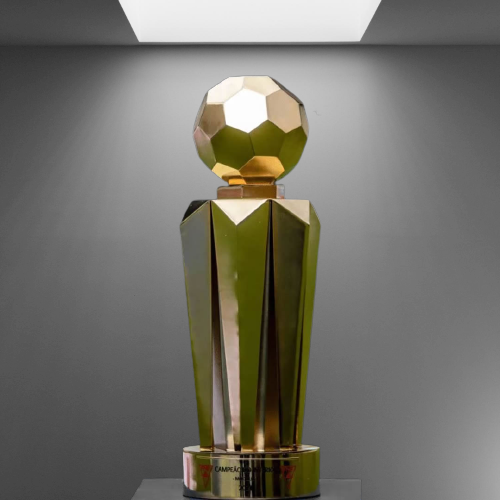
Trophy: Champion of Minas Gerais outside Belo Horizonte in 2022.

The club's football matches take place at Joaquim Portugal Stadium.

In January 2021, the board made the club's stadium available to the city for use as a vaccination point.

== Public relations ==
=== Death of Pelé ===
The team published an official lamentation for the death of the King of Football, Pelé, in December.

=== Charity ===
==== Blood donation ====
The team stimulates the blood donation to the state of Minas Gerais' public foundation for hematology and blood transfusion, Hemominas (Fundação Centro de Hematologia e Hemoterapia do Estado de Minas Gerais).

==== Winter clothes ====
The team stimulates the donation of winter clothes in the city.
