= Eduardo Person =

Brazilian footballer (born 1997)

Personal information
- Full name: Eduardo Luiz Person
- Date of birth: 24 January 1997 (age 29)
- Place of birth: São Paulo, Brazil
- Height: 1.74 m (5 ft 9 in)
- Position: Midfielder

Team information
- Current team: América Mineiro
- Number: 21

Youth career
- Joinville

Senior career*
Years	Team	Apps	(Gls)
2017–2021	Joinville	28	(1)
2017	→ Metropolitano (loan)	4	(0)
2017	→ Juventus Jaraguá (loan)	7	(0)
2019	→ Brasil de Pelotas (loan)	16	(0)
2020–2021	→ Guarani (loan)	25	(1)
2022	Guarani	28	(0)
2023–2024	Ituano	59	(5)
2025–2026	Chapecoense	13	(0)
2026–	América Mineiro	25	(2)
- * Club domestic league appearances and goals as of 18 November 2026

Eduardo Luiz Person (born 24 January 1997) is a Brazilian professional footballer who plays as a midfielder for América Mineiro.

== Club career ==
Born in São Paulo, São Paulo (state), Person was a Joinville youth graduate. He made his first team debut on 9 February 2017, coming on as a late substitute for Jonathan in a 2–0 away loss against Atlético Mineiro, for the year's Primeira Liga.

In April 2017, Person was loaned to Série D side Metropolitano until the end of the tournament. In July, after the club's elimination from the competition, he moved to Juventus de Jaraguá also in a temporary deal.

Person returned to JEC for the 2018 season, and became a regular starter for the side. In July of that year, however, he suffered a knee injury, only returning in the following March.

In July 2019, Person was loaned to Brasil de Pelotas in the Série B. He returned to Joinville in December, but moved on loan to fellow second division side Guarani on 6 January 2020.

In October 2020, Person suffered another knee injury, and his loan was renewed for a further year on 27 January 2021. Back to action in August, he signed a permanent deal with Bugre on 23 December 2021.

On 13 December 2022, Person was announced at Ituano also in the second division.

== Career statistics ==
As of 7 March 2023

Club	Season	League			State League		Cup		Continental		Other		Total	
Club	Season	Division	Apps	Goals	Apps	Goals	Apps	Goals	Apps	Goals	Apps	Goals	Apps	Goals
Joinville	2017	Série C	0	0	0	0	0	0	—		2 (Note: Appearance(s) in Primeira Liga)	0	2	0
Joinville	2018	Série C	8	0	17	1	2	0	—		—		27	1
Joinville	2019	Série D	3	0	0	0	0	0	—		—		3	0
Joinville	Subtotal		11	0	17	1	2	0	—		2	0	32	1
Metropolitano (loan)	2017	Série D	4	0	—		—		—		—		4	0
Juventus Jaraguá (loan)	2017	Catarinense Série B	—		7	0	—		—		—		7	0
Brasil de Pelotas (loan)	2019	Série B	16	0	—		—		—		—		16	0
Guarani	2020	Série B	14	1	9	0	—		—		—		23	1
Guarani	2021	Série B	2	0	0	0	0	0	—		—		2	0
Guarani	2022	Série B	19	0	9	0	0	0	—		—		28	0
Guarani	Subtotal		35	1	18	0	0	0	—		—		53	1
Ituano	2023	Série B	0	0	12	3	1	0	—		—		13	3
Career total			66	1	54	4	3	0	0	0	2	0	125	5
