= Galiléia =

Municipality in Southeast Brazil

Coordinates: 18°59′56″S 41°32′16″W

Galileia
- Municipality
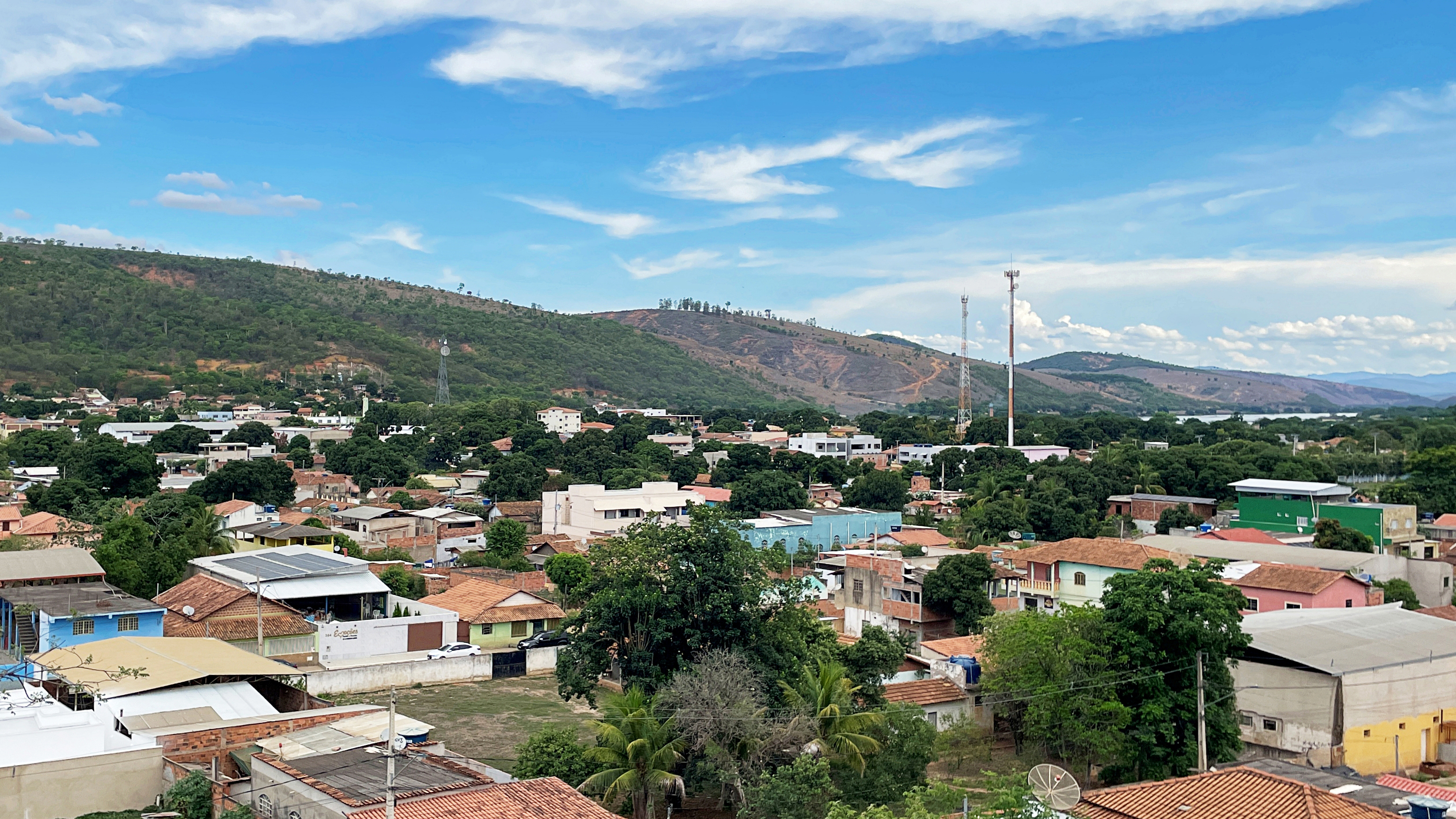
- Partial view of Galileia

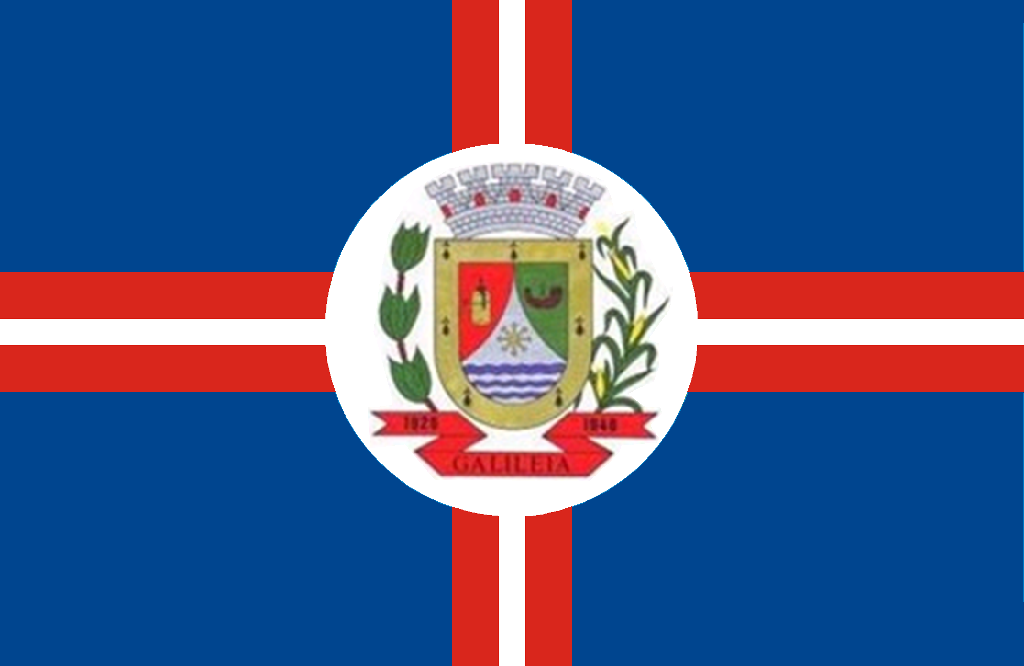
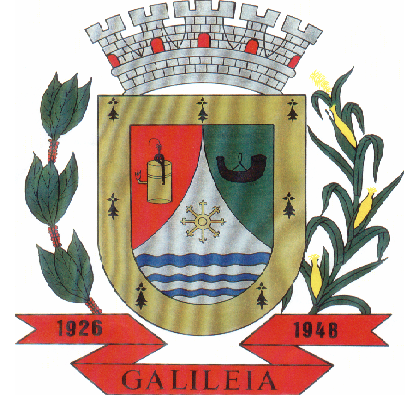
- Flag Coat of arms

- Localization of Galileia
- Country: Brazil
- Region: Southeast
- State: Minas Gerais
- Mesoregion: Vale do Rio Doce
- Microregion: Governador Valadares

Population (2022 Census)
  - Total: 6,222
  - Estimate (2025): 6,244
- Time zone: UTC−3 (BRT)

Galileia is a municipality in the state of Minas Gerais in the Southeast region of Brazil.

== See also ==
- List of municipalities in Minas Gerais
