= Jori (footballer, born 1996) =

Brazilian footballer

Personal information
- Full name: Joriwinnyson Santos dos Anjos Rodrigues
- Date of birth: 15 March 1996 (age 30)
- Place of birth: Governador Valadares, Brazil
- Height: 1.90 m (6 ft 3 in)
- Position: Goalkeeper

Team information
- Current team: América Mineiro
- Number: 12

Youth career
- América Mineiro

Senior career*
Years	Team	Apps	(Gls)
2016–	América Mineiro	53	(0)
2017	→ Guarani-MG (loan)	0	(0)
2021	→ Coimbra (loan)	8	(0)
- * Club domestic league appearances and goals as of 17 December 2025

Joriwinnyson Santos dos Anjos Rodrigues (born 15 March 1996), commonly known as Jori or Jory, is a Brazilian footballer who currently plays as a goalkeeper for América Mineiro.

== Career statistics ==
As of 1 March 2023.

Club	Season	League			State League		Cup		Continental		Other		Total	
Club	Season	Division	Apps	Goals	Apps	Goals	Apps	Goals	Apps	Goals	Apps	Goals	Apps	Goals
América Mineiro	2016	Série A	0	0	0	0	0	0	—		—		0	0
América Mineiro	2017	Série B	0	0	0	0	0	0	—		—		0	0
América Mineiro	2018	Série A	9	0	2	0	0	0	—		—		11	0
América Mineiro	2019	Série B	15	0	0	0	0	0	—		—		15	0
América Mineiro	2020	Série B	1	0	1	0	0	0	—		—		2	0
América Mineiro	2021	Série A	3	0	—		0	0	—		—		3	0
América Mineiro	2022	Série A	0	0	6	0	0	0	0	0	—		6	0
América Mineiro	2023	Série A	0	0	1	0	0	0	0	0	—		1	0
América Mineiro	Total		28	0	10	0	0	0	0	0	—		38	0
Guarani-MG (loan)	2017	Mineiro Módulo II	—		0	0	—		—		—		0	0
Coimbra (loan)	2021	Mineiro	—		8	0	—		—		—		8	0
Career total			28	0	18	0	0	0	0	0	0	0	46	0

== Honours ==
América Mineiro

- Campeonato Brasileiro Série B: 2017
