= Ighor Gabryel =

Brazilian footballer (born 2003)

Personal information
- Full name: Ighor Gabryel Vieira Gonçalves
- Date of birth: 15 January 2003 (age 23)
- Place of birth: Brumadinho, Brazil
- Height: 1.76 m (5 ft 9 in)
- Position: Forward

Team information
- Current team: América Mineiro
- Number: 91

Youth career
- 2019–2023: América Mineiro

Senior career*
Years	Team	Apps	(Gls)
2023–	América Mineiro	1	(0)
- * Club domestic league appearances and goals as of 15:11, 1 December 2023 (UTC)

Ighor Gabryel Vieira Gonçalves (born 15 January 2003), known as Ighor Gabryel, is a Brazilian professional footballer who plays as a forward for América Mineiro.

== Career ==
Born in Brumadinho, Minas Gerais, Ighor Gabryel joined América Mineiro's youth setup in 2019. On 29 September 2020, aged 17, he signed his first professional contract with the club.

On 10 July 2023, after recovering from a serious knee injury, Ighor Gabryel further extended his link until December 2025. He made his first team – and Série A – debut on 26 November, coming on as a second-half substitute for Felipe Azevedo in a 3–0 home loss to Flamengo, as his side were already relegated.

== Career statistics ==
As of 1 December 2023

Club	Season	League			State League		Cup		Continental		Other		Total	
Club	Season	Division	Apps	Goals	Apps	Goals	Apps	Goals	Apps	Goals	Apps	Goals	Apps	Goals
América Mineiro	2023	Série A	1	0	0	0	0	0	0	0	—		1	0
Career total			1	0	0	0	0	0	0	0	0	0	1	0
