= Paquetá, Rio de Janeiro =

Paquetá
- Neighborhood
- Administrative region of Ilha de Paquetá (where is located the neighborhood of Paquetá) within municipality of Rio de Janeiro;inset: within state of Rio de Janeiro
- Interactive map of Paquetá
- Coordinates: 22°45′34″S 43°06′29″W
- Country: Brazil
- State: Rio de Janeiro
- Municipality: Rio de Janeiro
- Neighborhood: Central Zone
- Administrative Region: Ilha de Paquetá

Population
  - Total: near 1,000

Paquetá is a neighborhood located on the island of the same name, Paquetá, in the municipality of Rio de Janeiro, Brazil.
