= Alexandre Silva =

Alexandre Silva (Portuguese spelling) may refer to:

- Alexandre da Silva, known as Guga (born 1964), Brazilian footballer
- Alexandre Alves da Silva (born 1981), Brazilian footballer
- Alexandre Afonso da Silva (born 1983), Brazilian footballer
- Alexandre Jansen Da Silva (born 1987), Belgian footballer
- Alexandre Nascimento Costa Silva (born 1997), Portuguese footballer
- Alexandre Duarte Silva (born 1983), Brazilian footballer
- Alexandre Rodrigues da Silva, known as Alexandre Pato, Brazilian footballer
- Alexandre da Silva Mariano, known as Amaral (born 1973), Brazilian footballer
- Alexandre da Silva, known as Chiquinho (born 1974), Brazilian footballer

Alessandro da Silva (Italian spelling) may refer to:

- Alessandro Alvares da Silva (born 1970), former Brazilian footballer
- Alessandro Viana da Silva (born 1982), Brazilian footballer

Alex da Silva may refer to:

- Alex da Silva (footballer, born 1981), Brazilian footballer
- Alex Da Silva (dancer) (born 1968), Brazilian-born, LA-based salsa dancer
- Alex da Silva Coelho (born 1996), Brazilian mixed martial artist

Alex Silva may refer to:

- Alex Sandro da Silva (born 1985), Brazilian footballer
- Alex William Costa e Silva (born 1988), Brazilian footballer
- Alex Silva (wrestler) (born 1990), Canadian professional wrestler Alexandre Freitas
- Alex Silva (footballer, born 1993), Uruguayan footballer
- Alex Silva (footballer, born 1994), Brazilian footballer
- Alex Silva (footballer, born 1990), Uruguayan footballer
