= Esporte Clube Primavera =

Football club based in São Paulo, Brazil

Primavera
- Full name: Esporte Clube Primavera
- Founded: 27 January 1927; 99 years ago
- Dissolved: Fantasma da Ituana; Tricolor Indaiatubano; Fantasma Tricolor
- Ground: Ítalo Mário Limongi
- Capacity: 7,820
- Head coach: Fernando Marchiori
- League: Campeonato Paulista
- 2025: Paulista Série A2, 2nd of 16 (promoted)
Home colours	Away colours

Esporte Clube Primavera, commonly referred to as Primavera, is a Brazilian professional association football club based in Indaiatuba, São Paulo. The team competes in the Campeonato Paulista Série A1, the first tier of the São Paulo state football league.

In 2022, the former player Deco, together with businessman Nenê Zini, acquired 90% of Esporte Clube Primavera's SAF (Sociedade Anônima do Futebol). The two had already invested in the team since 2020 through the management group formed by their respective companies (BN Zini and D20 Sports).

In 2025, Primavera achieved its greatest campaign in history and achieved unprecedented promotion to the Paulistão. The promotion match took place in Indaiatuba on March 29th, with Primavera winning 2-1 (4-1 on aggregate) against Taubaté.

== History ==
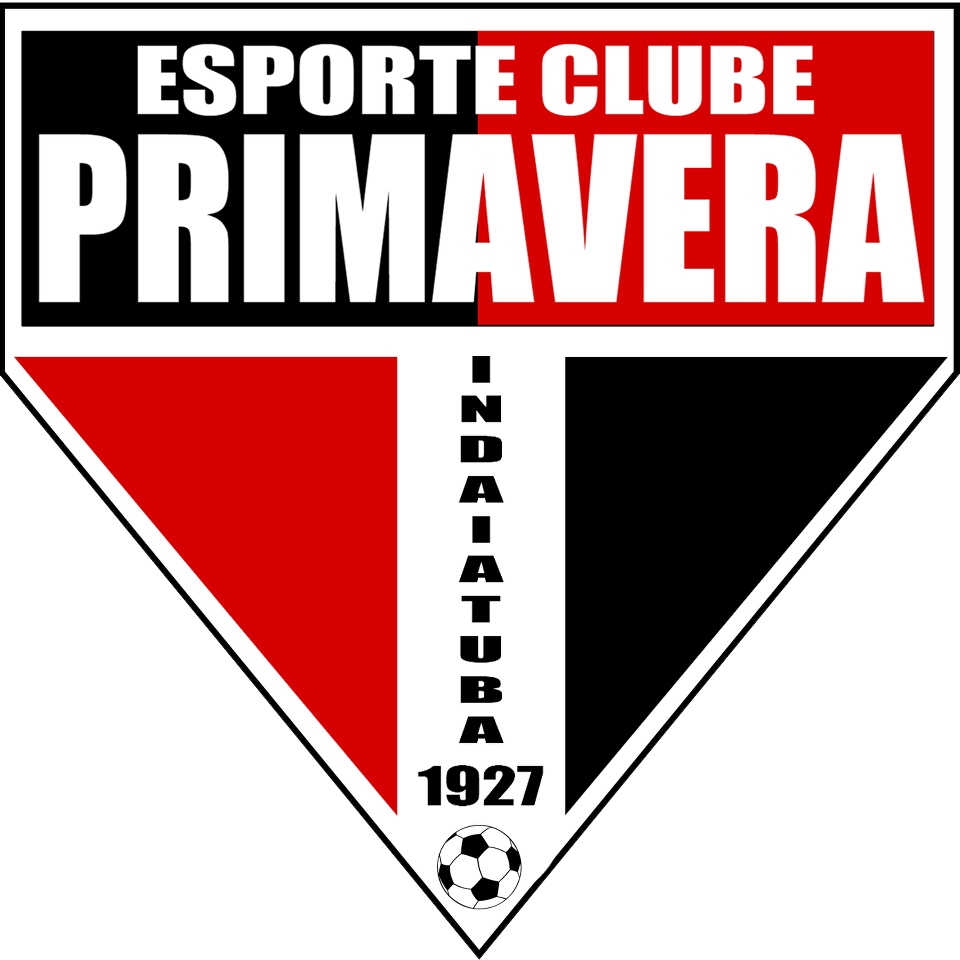
Club crest used until 2023

The club was founded on 27 January 1927, after the merger of local clubs Indaiatubano Futebol Clube and Primavera Futebol Clube. Primavera won the Campeonato Paulista Segunda Divisão in 1977, and the Campeonato Paulista Série B2 in 2001. The club joined a partnership with Spanish club Racing de Santander in 2007, and was renamed to Real Racing Primavera. After the partnership ended, the club was renamed back to Esporte Clube Primavera.

== Honours ==
=== Official tournaments ===
State
Competitions	Titles	Seasons
Campeonato Paulista Série A4	3	1977, 1995, 2018
Campeonato Paulista Segunda Divisão	1^{s}	2001

- record
- ^{s} shared record

=== Runners-up ===
- Copa Paulista (1): 2025
- Campeonato Paulista Série A2 (1): 2025
- Campeonato Paulista Série A3 (1): 2021
- Campeonato Paulista Série A4 (1): 2003

== Stadium ==
Esporte Clube Primavera play their home games at Estádio Ítalo Mário Limongi, nicknamed Estádio Gigante da Vila Industrial. The stadium has a maximum capacity of 8,022 people.

== Current squad ==
As of 10 January 2026

Note: Flags indicate national team as defined under FIFA eligibility rules; some limited exceptions apply. Players may hold more than one non-FIFA nationality.

No.	Pos.	Nation	Player
—	GK	BRA	Dheimison
—	GK	BRA	Levy
—	GK	BRA	Victor Hugo
—	GK	BRA	Vitor Soares
—	DF	BRA	Afonso
—	DF	BRA	Gabriel Tobias
—	DF	BRA	Ligger
—	DF	BRA	Renato Vischi
—	DF	BRA	João Victor
—	DF	BRA	Júnior Caiçara
—	DF	BRA	Kevin
—	DF	BRA	Thales Oleques
—	MF	BRA	Bruno Lima
—	MF	BRA	Luan Martins
—	MF	BRA	Matheus Anjos

No.	Pos.	Nation	Player
—	MF	BRA	Paulinho
—	MF	BRA	Renatinho
—	MF	AZE	Richard Almeida
—	MF	BRA	Yuri Lima
—	FW	BRA	Brunão
—	FW	BRA	Gabriel Poveda
—	FW	BRA	Josiel
—	FW	BRA	Kauan Cunha
—	FW	BRA	Léo Passos
—	FW	BRA	Lucas Douglas
—	FW	BRA	Luiz Fernando
—	FW	BRA	Murilo
—	FW	BRA	Neto
—	FW	BRA	Paulo Baya
—	FW	BRA	Welliton

=== Out on loan ===
Note: Flags indicate national team as defined under FIFA eligibility rules; some limited exceptions apply. Players may hold more than one non-FIFA nationality.

No.	Pos.	Nation	Player
—	DF	BRA	Kauan Martins (at Anápolis until 30 November 2026)
—	FW	BRA	Felipe Cruz (at Marcílio Dias until 30 March 2026)

No.	Pos.	Nation	Player
—	FW	BRA	Hugo (at Palmeiras until 14 August 2026)
