= Mateus Henrique =

Brazilian footballer (born 2002)

Personal information
- Full name: Mateus Henrique Alves Silva
- Date of birth: 2 October 2002 (age 24)
- Place of birth: Salinas, Brazil
- Height: 1.78 m (5 ft 10 in)
- Positions: Midfielder; right-back

Team information
- Current team: Shabab Al Ahli
- Number: 75

Youth career
- América Mineiro

Senior career*
Years	Team	Apps	(Gls)
2022–2025	América Mineiro	29	(0)
2025–	Shabab Al Ahli	9	(0)
- * Club domestic league appearances and goals as of 21:21, 7 June 2023 (UTC)

Mateus Henrique Alves Silva (born 2 October 2002), known as Mateus Henrique, is a Brazilian professional footballer who plays as a midfielder or right back for Shabab Al Ahli.

== Career ==
Born in Salinas, Minas Gerais, Mateus Henrique was an América Mineiro youth graduate. He made his first team debut on 25 January 2022, coming on as a second-half substitute for Yan Sasse in a 2–1 Campeonato Mineiro away loss against Caldense.

Back to the under-20s after three more matches with the main squad, Mateus Henrique renewed his contract with Coelho until 2025 on 16 February 2023. He made his Série A debut on 3 June, starting as a right back in a 2–0 home win over Corinthians.

== Career statistics ==
As of 7 June 2023

Club	Season	League			State League		Cup		Continental		Other		Total	
Club	Season	Division	Apps	Goals	Apps	Goals	Apps	Goals	Apps	Goals	Apps	Goals	Apps	Goals
América Mineiro	2022	Série A	0	0	4	0	0	0	—		—		4	0
América Mineiro	2023	Série A	1	0	0	0	0	0	2 (Note: Appearance(s) in Copa Sudamericana)	0	—		3	0
Career total			1	0	4	0	0	0	2	0	0	0	7	0
