= Tavinho (footballer, born 2004) =

Brazilian footballer

Personal information
- Full name: Luiz Otávio Maria
- Date of birth: 19 July 2004 (age 22)
- Place of birth: Dourado, Brazil
- Height: 1.72 m (5 ft 8 in)
- Position: Attacking midfielder

Team information
- Current team: Novorizontino
- Number: 15

Youth career
- 2018–2025: Novorizontino
- 2021–2025: → Fortaleza (loan)

Senior career*
Years	Team	Apps	(Gls)
2025–	Novorizontino	41	(3)
- * Club domestic league appearances and goals as of 17 November 2026

Luiz Otávio Maria (born 19 July 2004), commonly known as Tavinho, is a Brazilian professional footballer who plays as an attacking midfielder for Novorizontino.

== Career ==
Born in Dourado, São Paulo, Tavinho joined the youth sides of Novorizontino in 2018. On 21 March 2024, he was loaned to Fortaleza until the following January, being initially a member of the under-20 team.

Back to Tigre in May 2025, Tavinho was promoted to the first team, and made his professional debut on 29 June of that year, coming on as a second-half substitute for Pablo Dyego in a 1–1 Série B home draw against Amazonas. He scored his first goal on 24 October, netting the opener in a home draw against Botafogo-SP for the same scoreline.

== Career statistics ==
As of 11 January 2026

Club	Season	League			State League		Cup		Continental		Other		Total	
Club	Season	Division	Apps	Goals	Apps	Goals	Apps	Goals	Apps	Goals	Apps	Goals	Apps	Goals
Novorizontino	2025	Série B	12	1	—		—		—		—		12	1
Novorizontino	2026	Série B	0	0	1	0	0	0	—		—		1	0
Career total			12	1	1	0	0	0	0	0	0	0	13	1
