= Matheus Paquetá =

Brazilian footballer (born 1995)

Personal information
- Full name: Matheus Tolentino Coelho de Lima
- Date of birth: 12 March 1995 (age 31)
- Place of birth: Rio de Janeiro, Brazil
- Position: Attacking midfielder

Senior career*
| Years | Team | Apps | (Gls) |
| 2016 | Ceres | 6 | (0) |
| 2017–2022 | Tombense | 21 | (0) |
| 2017 | → Marcílio Dias (loan) | 2 | (0) |
| 2018 | → Almirante Barroso (loan) | 0 | (0) |
| 2019 | → Monza (loan) | 0 | (0) |
| 2020 | → CRB (loan) | 0 | (0) |
| 2020 | → Joinville (loan) | 0 | (0) |
| 2021 | → Boavista (loan) | 0 | (0) |
| 2021 | → Uberlândia (loan) | 3 | (0) |
| Total | | 32 | (0) |
- * Club domestic league appearances and goals

Matheus Tolentino Coelho de Lima (born 12 March 1995), also known as Matheus Paquetá, is a Brazilian former professional footballer who played as an attacking midfielder. He is the older brother of professional footballer Lucas Paquetá.

== Career ==
=== Tombense ===
==== 2019: Loan to Monza ====
On 23 January 2019, Italian Serie C side Monza announced the signing of Paquetá on a six-month loan from Tombense. He came on as a last-minute substitute in a Coppa Italia Serie C match against Pro Vercelli on 6 February.

==== 2020: Loans to CRB and Joinville ====
Paquetá was sent on a six-month loan to CRB in the Campeonato Brasileiro Série B on 3 June 2020. He left the club without playing a game.

On 18 September, he was sent on loan to Série D club Joinville, once again without featuring in any match.

==== 2020–2021: Return to Tombense ====
Upon his return to Tombense, Paquetá made his Série C debut during the 2020 season, coming on as a substitute in the 87th minute in a 2–0 win over Brusque, on 21 November.

==== 2021: Loans to Boavista and Uberlândia ====
On 25 June 2021, Paquetá joined Boavista in the Série D on loan. Less than one month later, he moved to fellow-Série D side Uberlândia on loan. Paqueta made his league debut on 24 July, as a starter in a 2–0 win against Águia Negra.

== Personal life ==
Paquetá's mother is of Portuguese descent. His younger brother, Lucas, is also a professional footballer.

== Career statistics ==
Appearances and goals by club, season and competition
| Club | Season | League | | | State league | | Copa do Brasil | | Other | | Total | |
| Club | Season | Division | Apps | Goals | Apps | Goals | Apps | Goals | Apps | Goals | Apps | Goals |
|---|---|---|---|---|---|---|---|---|---|---|---|---|
| Ceres | 2016 | — | | | 6 (Note: Appearances in Campeonato Carioca Série B1) | 0 | — | | — | | 6 | 0 |
| Tombense | 2017 | Série C | — | | 0 | 0 | — | | — | | 0 | 0 |
| Tombense | 2018 | Série C | 0 | 0 | 0 | 0 | — | | — | | 0 | 0 |
| Tombense | 2019 | Série C | — | | 0 | 0 | — | | — | | 0 | 0 |
| Tombense | 2020 | Série C | 1 | 0 | — | | — | | — | | 1 | 0 |
| Tombense | 2021 | Série C | — | | 8 (Note: Appearances in Campeonato Mineiro) | 0 | 1 | 0 | 1 (Note: Appearance in Recopa Mineira) | 0 | 10 | 0 |
| Tombense | 2022 | Série B | 6 | 0 | 6 | 0 | 2 | 0 | — | | 14 | 0 |
| Tombense | Total | | 7 | 0 | 14 | 0 | 3 | 0 | 1 | 0 | 25 | 0 |
| Marcílio Dias (loan) | 2017 | — | | | 2 (Note: Appearances in Catarinense Série B) | 0 | — | | — | | 2 | 0 |
| Almirante Barroso (loan) | 2018 | — | | | — | | — | | — | | 0 | 0 |
| Monza (loan) | 2018–19 | Serie C | — | | — | | — | | 1 (Note: Appearance in Coppa Italia Serie C) | 0 | 1 | 0 |
| CRB (loan) | 2020 | Série B | 0 | 0 | — | | 0 | 0 | — | | 0 | 0 |
| Joinville (loan) | 2020 | Série D | 0 | 0 | — | | — | | — | | 0 | 0 |
| Boavista (loan) | 2021 | Série D | 0 | 0 | — | | 0 | 0 | — | | 0 | 0 |
| Uberlândia (loan) | 2021 | Série D | 3 | 0 | — | | — | | — | | 3 | 0 |
| Career total | | | 10 | 0 | 22 | 0 | 3 | 0 | 2 | 0 | 37 | 0 |

== Honours ==
Monza

- Coppa Italia Serie C runner-up: 2018–19
