= Felipe Amaral =

Brazilian footballer

Personal information
- Full name: Felipe Amaral Casarin Damasceno
- Date of birth: 8 July 2003 (age 23)
- Place of birth: Campinas, Brazil
- Height: 1.74 m (5 ft 9 in)
- Position: Defensive midfielder

Team information
- Current team: América Mineiro
- Number: 8

Youth career
- 2013–2022: Ponte Preta

Senior career*
Years	Team	Apps	(Gls)
2022–2024	Ponte Preta	82	(2)
2024–	América Mineiro	97	(3)

International career
2022	Brazil U20	2	(0)
- * Club domestic league appearances and goals as of 18 November 2026

Felipe Amaral Casarin Damasceno (born 8 July 2003), known as Felipe Amaral, is a Brazilian footballer who plays as a defensive midfielder for América Mineiro.

== Club career ==
Born in Campinas, São Paulo, Amaral joined the youth setup of hometown side Ponte Preta in 2013, aged ten. He made his first team debut on 9 April 2022, starting in a 0–0 Série B home draw against Grêmio.

On 16 August 2022, Amaral renewed his contract with the club until December 2024. On 28 September, after already establishing himself as a starter, he scored his first professional goal by netting the opener in a 4–1 home loss to Cruzeiro.

== International career ==
In November 2022, Amaral was called up to the Brazil under-20 team for friendlies against Chile. He featured in both matches, both as a substitute.

== Career statistics ==
As of 14 November 2023

Club	Season	League			State League		Cup		Continental		Other		Total	
Club	Season	Division	Apps	Goals	Apps	Goals	Apps	Goals	Apps	Goals	Apps	Goals	Apps	Goals
Ponte Preta	2020	Série B	0	0	—		—		—		1 (Note: Appearance(s) in Copa Paulista)	0	1	0
Ponte Preta	2022	Série B	32	1	—		—		—		—		32	1
Ponte Preta	2023	Série B	30	1	19	0	2	0	—		—		51	1
Ponte Preta	2024	Série B	0	0	1	0	—		—		—		1	0
Ponte Preta	Total		62	2	20	0	2	0	0	0	1	0	85	1
América Mineiro	2024	Série B	0	0	4	0	—		—		—		4	0
Career total			62	2	24	0	2	0	0	0	1	0	89	1

== Honours ==
Ponte Preta

- Campeonato Paulista Série A2: 2023
