= Tombense Futebol Clube =

Brazilian association football club based in Tombos, Minas Gerais, Brazil

Tombense
- Full name: Tombense Futebol Clube
- Nicknames: Gavião-Carcará (Crested Caracara); Valente de Tombos (Valiant from Tombos)
- Founded: 7 September 1914; 112 years ago
- Ground: Almeidão
- Capacity: 3,050
- President: Lane Gaviolle
- Head coach: Marcelo Chamusca
- League: Campeonato Brasileiro Série D Campeonato Mineiro
- 2025 2025: Série C, 20th of 20 (relegated); Mineiro, 3rd of 12
- Website: tombense.com.br
Home colors	Away colors

Tombense Futebol Clube, commonly referred to as Tombense, is a Brazilian professional club based in Tombos, Minas Gerais founded on 7 September 1914.

== History ==
The club was founded on 7 September 1914. They won the Campeonato Mineiro Segunda Divisão in 2002 and in 2006.

In 2014, the club was promoted to the third division after winning the fourth division. This was the club's first national title.

== Honours ==
=== Official tournaments ===
National
Competitions	Titles	Seasons
Campeonato Brasileiro Série D	1	2014
State
Competitions	Titles	Seasons
Recopa Mineira	2	2020, 2021
Campeonato Mineiro Segunda Divisão	2	2002, 2006

- record

=== Others tournaments ===
==== State ====
- Campeonato Mineiro do Interior (5): 2013, 2020, 2021, 2024, 2025
- Troféu Inconfidência (1): 2023

=== Runners-up ===
- Campeonato Brasileiro Série C (1): 2021
- Campeonato Mineiro (1): 2020
- Campeonato Mineiro Módulo II (1): 2012
- Campeonato Mineiro Segunda Divisão (1): 2009

== Players ==
=== First team squad ===
As of 18 September 2023

Note: Flags indicate national team as defined under FIFA eligibility rules; some limited exceptions apply. Players may hold more than one non-FIFA nationality.

No.	Pos.	Nation	Player
—	GK	BRA	Felipe Garcia
—	GK	BRA	Léo Lang
—	GK	BRA	Paulo Vitor
—	DF	BRA	Augusto
—	DF	BRA	Mateus Buiate
—	DF	BRA	Roger Carvalho
—	DF	BRA	Pedro Costa
—	DF	BRA	Ednei
—	DF	BRA	Egídio
—	DF	BRA	Emerson
—	DF	BRA	Luis Felipe (on loan from Cruzeiro)
—	DF	BRA	Kevin
—	DF	BRA	Lucas Marques (on loan from Grêmio Prudente)
—	DF	BRA	Guilherme Santos
—	DF	BRA	Zé Vitor
—	DF	BRA	Wesley
—	DF	BRA	Wisney
—	MF	BRA	Matheus Claudino
—	MF	BRA	Djalma (on loan from EC São Bernardo)
—	MF	BRA	Matheus Frizzo
—	MF	URU	Patricio Gregorio
—	MF	BRA	Bruno Matias
—	MF	URU	Franco Mederos (on loan from Central Español)

No.	Pos.	Nation	Player
—	MF	BRA	Matheus Paquetá
—	MF	BRA	João Pedro (on loan from Vitória)
—	MF	BRA	Zé Ricardo
—	MF	BRA	Robert (on loan from Aparecidense)
—	MF	BRA	Romarinho
—	MF	BRA	Lucas Santos
—	MF	BRA	Bruno Silva
—	FW	BRA	Amarildo
—	FW	BRA	Daniel Amorim
—	FW	BRA	Rodrigo Carioca
—	FW	BRA	Igor Cássio
—	FW	BRA	Fernandão
—	FW	BRA	Jáderson (on loan from Athletico Paranaense)
—	FW	BRA	Alexandre Jesus (on loan from Fluminense)
—	FW	BRA	Keké
—	FW	BRA	Kleiton (on loan from Athletico Paranaense)
—	FW	BRA	Marcelinho
—	FW	BRA	Ruan Levine
—	FW	BRA	Rafinha (on loan from Capivariano)
—	FW	BRA	Alex Sandro
—	FW	BRA	Vitinho

=== Out on loan ===
Note: Flags indicate national team as defined under FIFA eligibility rules; some limited exceptions apply. Players may hold more than one non-FIFA nationality.

No.	Pos.	Nation	Player
—	DF	BRA	Arthur (at Vitória das Tabocas until 31 December 2023)
—	DF	BRA	Gabriel Carioca (at Uberlândia until 30 November 2023)
—	DF	BRA	David (at Aparecidense until 31 January 2024)
—	DF	BRA	Diego Ferreira (at Náutico until 30 November 2023)
—	DF	BRA	Gabriel Lira (at Figueirense U20 until 31 January 2024)
—	DF	BRA	Manoel (at Mirassol until 30 November 2023)
—	DF	BRA	Ramon Pereira (at Centro Oeste SAF until 31 December 2023)
—	MF	BRA	Gustavo Cazonatti (at Chapecoense until 31 December 2023)
—	MF	BRA	Ítalo Henrique (at Portuguesa until 31 December 2023)
—	MF	BRA	Jhemerson (at Brusque until 30 November 2023)
—	MF	BRA	Gabriel Lima (at Centro Oeste SAF until 30 November 2024)
—	MF	BRA	Jean Lucas (at Avaí until 31 December 2023)
—	MF	BRA	Marquinhos (at Concórdia until 30 November 2023)
—	MF	BRA	Luiz Otávio (at Sampaio Corrêa until 31 December 2023)
—	MF	BRA	Rhayner (at CSA until 30 November 2023)

No.	Pos.	Nation	Player
—	MF	BRA	Rodrigo (at Brusque until 30 November 2023)
—	MF	BRA	Yann Rolim (at Ituano until 30 November 2023)
—	MF	BRA	Vander (at Maranhão until 31 December 2023)
—	MF	BRA	Léo Xavier (at Uberlândia until 30 November 2023)
—	FW	BRA	Caíque (at Aparecidense until 31 January 2024)
—	FW	BRA	Maycon Douglas (at ABC until 31 December 2023)
—	FW	BRA	Everton (at Grêmio until 31 December 2023)
—	FW	BRA	Luiz Fernando (at Primavera until 30 November 2023)
—	FW	BRA	Luiz Fernando (at Juventude until 31 December 2023)
—	FW	BRA	Getúlio (at Ventforet Kofu until 31 December 2023)
—	FW	BRA	Gabriel Henrique (at Uberlândia until 30 November 2023)
—	FW	BRA	Marcelinho (at Caxias until 30 November 2023)
—	FW	BRA	Bruno Rodrigues (at Cruzeiro until 31 December 2023)
—	FW	BRA	Rubens (at Ypiranga until 31 December 2023)
