= Yago Santos (footballer) =

Brazilian footballer

Personal information
- Full name: Yago Santos de Andrade
- Date of birth: 3 April 2003 (age 23)
- Place of birth: Santos, Brazil
- Height: 1.84 m (6 ft 0 in)
- Position: Midfielder

Team information
- Current team: Athletic

Youth career
- Portuguesa Santista
- 2018–2023: Palmeiras
- 2023–2024: América Mineiro

Senior career*
Years	Team	Apps	(Gls)
2021–2023	Palmeiras	1	(0)
2023–	América Mineiro	33	(0)
2026–	Athletic	12	(1)
- * Club domestic league appearances and goals as of 18 November 2026

Yago Santos (born 3 April 2003) is a Brazilian professional footballer who plays as a midfielder for Athletic.

== Club career ==
Yago Santos made his professional debut for Palmeiras on the 10 December 2021, replacing fellow academy graduate Vitor Hugo in a 1–0 home win against Ceará, concluding the Serie A season of the recent Copa Libertadores winners.
