= 1983 São Paulo FC season =

São Paulo
1983 season
- Chairman: José Douglas Dallora
- Manager: José Poy (until May 7); José Carlos Serrão (caretaker, until May 18); Mário Travaglini
- Série A: Quarterfinals
- Campeonato Paulista: Runners-up
- Top goalscorer: League: Careca (17); All: Renato (33)

The 1983 São Paulo F.C. season details the competitions entered, matches played and teams faced by the São Paulo Futebol Clube in the 1983 season, showing the result in each event. Both friendly and official events are included. São Paulo Futebol Clube is a professional football club based in São Paulo, Brazil. They play in the Campeonato Paulista, São Paulo's state league, and the Campeonato Brasileiro Série A or Brasileirão, Brazil's national league.

== Statistics ==
=== Scorers ===
| Position | Nation | Playing position | Name | Campeonato Brasileiro | Campeonato Paulista | Others | Total |
|---|---|---|---|---|---|---|---|
| 1 | (Brazil) | MF | Renato | 14 | 18 | 1 | 33 |
| 2 | (Brazil) | FW | Careca | 17 | 10 | 5 | 32 |
| 3 | (Brazil) | FW | Agnaldo | 2 | 7 | 0 | 9 |
| 4 | (Brazil) | FW | Marcão | 0 | 8 | 0 | 8 |
| = | (Brazil) | FW | Zé Sérgio | 3 | 5 | 0 | 8 |
| 5 | (Uruguay) | DF | Darío Pereyra | 3 | 1 | 1 | 5 |
| 6 | (Brazil) | DF | Getúlio | 0 | 4 | 0 | 4 |
| = | (Brazil) | MF | Humberto | 0 | 3 | 1 | 4 |
| = | (Brazil) | FW | Paulo César | 2 | 2 | 0 | 4 |
| 7 | (Brazil) | MF | Zé Mário | 2 | 1 | 0 | 3 |
| 8 | (Brazil) | MF | Heriberto | 2 | 0 | 0 | 2 |
| = | (Brazil) | FW | Newton | 0 | 2 | 0 | 2 |
| = | (Brazil) | DF | Oscar | 0 | 2 | 0 | 2 |
| = | (Brazil) | DF | Paulo | 1 | 1 | 0 | 2 |
| 9 | (Brazil) | DF | Gassem | 0 | 1 | 0 | 1 |
| = | (Brazil) | DF | Gualberto | 0 | 1 | 0 | 1 |
| = | (Brazil) | MF | Márcio Araújo | 0 | 1 | 0 | 1 |
| = | (Brazil) | DF | Nelsinho | 0 | 1 | 0 | 1 |
| = | (Brazil) | FW | Sídney | 0 | 1 | 0 | 1 |
| | | | Own goals | 2 | 1 | 0 | 3 |
| | | | Total | 47 | 70 | 8 | 125 |

=== Overall ===
| Games played | 73 (22 Campeonato Brasileiro, 48 Campeonato Paulista, 3 Friendly match) |
| Games won | 38 (13 Campeonato Brasileiro, 24 Campeonato Paulista, 1 Friendly match) |
| Games drawn | 23 (5 Campeonato Brasileiro, 18 Campeonato Paulista, 0 Friendly match) |
| Games lost | 12 (4 Campeonato Brasileiro, 6 Campeonato Paulista, 2 Friendly match) |
| Goals scored | 125 |
| Goals conceded | 67 |
| Goal difference | +58 |
| Best result | 5–1 (H) v Uberaba - Campeonato Brasileiro - 1983.4.2 |
| Worst result | 1–5 (A) v Grêmio - Campeonato Brasileiro - 1983.4.17 |
| Top scorer | Renato (33) |

Source: São Paulo FC

== Friendlies ==
=== Trans-Atlantic Challenge Cup ===
| May 30 International | Seattle Sounders (United States) | 4–2 | (Brazil) São Paulo | Seattle |
| | Kemp 7', 78'; Peterson 20', 85' | Report | Renato 11'; Humberto 87' | Stadium: Kingdome; Attendance: 6,792 |

| June 2 International | New York Cosmos (United States) | 2–3 | (Brazil) São Paulo | Meadowlands |
| | Bogićević 33'; Romerito 74' | | Careca 8', 24', 80' | Stadium: Giants Stadium; Attendance: 26,641; Referee: Don Gillies |

| June 5 International | Fiorentina (Italy) | 5–3 | (Brazil) São Paulo | Meadowlands |
| | Pecci 5'; Monelli 22'; Antognoni 31'; Bertoni 57', 85' | | Pereyra 2'; Careca 24', 73' | Stadium: Giants Stadium; Attendance: 51,825 |

== Official competitions ==
=== Campeonato Brasileiro ===
==== First phase ====
===== Group C =====
| Pos | Team | Pld | W | D | L | GF | GA | GD | Pts | Qualification |
|---|---|---|---|---|---|---|---|---|---|---|
| 1 | (São Paulo (state)) São Paulo | 8 | 5 | 3 | 0 | 13 | 1 | +12 | 13 | Second phase |
| 2 | (Rio Grande do Norte) América-RN | 8 | 4 | 1 | 3 | 7 | 9 | −2 | 9 | Second phase |
| 3 | Sergipe | 8 | 3 | 2 | 3 | 9 | 12 | −3 | 8 | Second phase |
| 4 | (Pernambuco) Sport | 8 | 2 | 3 | 3 | 10 | 10 | 0 | 7 | Repechage |
| 5 | (Bahia) Galícia | 8 | 0 | 3 | 5 | 2 | 9 | −7 | 3 | |

===== Matches =====
| 23 January 1983 1 | Sport | 0–0 | São Paulo | Recife |
| | | | | Stadium: Estádio do Rego Maciel (Arruda); Attendance: 25,461; Referee: José Roberto Wright |

| 26 January 1983 2 | Galícia | 0–0 | São Paulo | Salvador |
| | | | | Stadium: Estádio Octavio Mangabeira (Fonte Nova); Attendance: 9,706; Referee: Wilson dos Santos |

| 30 January 1983 3 | São Paulo | 4–0 | América-RN | São Paulo |
| | Renato 44', 55'; Careca 62'; Paulo César 68' | | | Stadium: Estádio Cícero Pompeu de Toledo (Morumbi); Attendance: 15,996; Referee: Pedro Carlos Bregalda |

| 6 February 1983 4 | Sergipe | 0–0 | São Paulo | Aracajú |
| | | | | Stadium: Complexo Esportivo Lourival Baptista; Attendance: 35,273; Referee: Arnaldo César Coelho |

| 10 February 1983 5 | São Paulo | 1–0 | Galícia | São Paulo |
| | Renato 27' | | | Stadium: Estádio Cícero Pompeu de Toledo (Morumbi); Attendance: 6,954; Referee: Júlio César Cosenza |

| 19 February 1983 6 | América-RN | 0–2 | São Paulo | Natal |
| | | | 55' Pereyra; 71' Careca | Stadium: Estádio Municipal Marechal Castelo Branco (Machadão); Attendance: 23,164; Referee: Valquir Pimentel |

| 26 February 1983 7 | São Paulo | 3–0 | Sergipe | São Paulo |
| | Careca 39'; Renato 82'; Zé Sérgio 84' | | | Stadium: Estádio Cícero Pompeu de Toledo (Morumbi); Attendance: 11,187; Referee: José Roberto Wright |

| 6 March 1983 8 | São Paulo | 3–1 | Sport | São Paulo |
| | Renato 13', 44'; Careca 21' | | Joãozinho 33' | Stadium: Estádio Cícero Pompeu de Toledo (Morumbi); Attendance: 5,926; Referee: Pedro Carlos Bregalda |

==== Second phase ====
===== Group K =====
| Pos | Team | Pld | W | D | L | GF | GA | GD | Pts | Qualification |
|---|---|---|---|---|---|---|---|---|---|---|
| 1 | (São Paulo (state)) São Paulo | 6 | 5 | 1 | 0 | 21 | 4 | +17 | 11 | Third phase |
| 2 | (Paraná (state)) Colorado | 6 | 3 | 1 | 2 | 8 | 12 | −4 | 7 | Third phase |
| 3 | (Minas Gerais) Uberaba | 6 | 1 | 1 | 4 | 9 | 14 | −5 | 3 | |
| 4 | (Goiás) Vila Nova | 6 | 1 | 1 | 4 | 5 | 13 | −8 | 3 | |

===== Matches =====
| 13 March 1983 1 | Uberaba | 1–4 | São Paulo | Uberaba |
| | Zé Carlos 33' | | Agnaldo 31', 47'; Careca 79'; Renato 85' | Stadium: Estádio Municipal Engenheiro João Guido (Uberabão); Attendance: 21,674; Referee: Luís Carlos Félix |

| 16 March 1983 2 | São Paulo | 4–0 | Vila Nova | São Paulo |
| | Careca 5', 27', 79'; Zé Mário 75' | | | Stadium: Estádio Cícero Pompeu de Toledo (Morumbi); Attendance: 6,016; Referee: Wilson dos Santos |

| 20 March 1983 3 | São Paulo | 4–0 | Colorado | São Paulo |
| | Renato 23', 53'; Careca 30'; Paulo 39' | | | Stadium: Estádio Cícero Pompeu de Toledo (Morumbi); Attendance: 16,541; Referee: Roque Gallas |

| 26 March 1983 4 | Vila Nova | 0–2 | São Paulo | Goiânia |
| | | | Careca 31', 67' | Stadium: Estádio do Governo do Estado de Goiás (Serra Dourada); Attendance: 16,557; Referee: Pedro Carlos Bregalda |

| 30 March 1983 5 | Colorado | 2–2 | São Paulo | Curitiba |
| | Jones 36', 64' | | Pereyra 69'; Careca 86' | Stadium: Estádio Major Antônio Couto Pereira; Attendance: 30,180; Referee: Sílvio de Oliveira |

| 2 April 1983 6 | São Paulo | 5–1 | Uberaba | São Paulo |
| | Careca 19', 68'; Renato 50', 88'; Zé Sérgio 73' | | Nei 86' | Stadium: Estádio Cícero Pompeu de Toledo (Morumbi); Attendance: 13,103; Referee: Arnaldo César Coelho |

==== Third phase ====
===== Group S =====
| Pos | Team | Pld | W | D | L | GF | GA | GD | Pts | Qualification |
|---|---|---|---|---|---|---|---|---|---|---|
| 1 | (São Paulo (state)) São Paulo | 6 | 3 | 1 | 2 | 12 | 9 | +3 | 7 | Quarterfinals |
| 2 | (Pernambuco) Sport | 6 | 3 | 1 | 2 | 9 | 7 | +2 | 7 | Quarterfinals |
| 3 | (Rio Grande do Sul) Grêmio | 6 | 2 | 3 | 1 | 14 | 11 | +3 | 7 | |
| 4 | (São Paulo (state)) Ferroviária | 6 | 1 | 1 | 4 | 7 | 15 | −8 | 3 | |

===== Matches =====
| 9 April 1983 1 | Sport | 1–0 | São Paulo | Recife |
| | João Carlos 53' | | | Stadium: Estádio do Rego Maciel (Arruda); Attendance: 38,049; Referee: Carlos Rosa Martins |

| 13 April 1983 2 | São Paulo | 3–1 | Ferroviária | São Paulo |
| | Renato 26'; Zé Mário 37'; Careca 46' | | Douglas Onça 78' | Stadium: Estádio Cícero Pompeu de Toledo (Morumbi); Attendance: 21,224; Referee: Valquir Pimentel |

| 17 April 1983 3 | Grêmio | 5–1 | São Paulo | Porto Alegre |
| | Tita 7', 90+1'; Renato 25'; Caio 52'; Tarciso 82' | | de León 50' (o.g.) | Stadium: Estádio Olímpico Monumental; Attendance: 40,820; Referee: Luís Carlos Félix |

| 20 April 1983 4 | Ferroviária | 0–4 | São Paulo | Araraquara |
| | | | Heriberto 14'; Zé Sérgio 80'; Renato 88'; Careca 89' | Stadium: Estádio Doutor Adhemar de Barros (Fonte Luminosa); Attendance: 6,468; Referee: Tito Rodrigues |

| 23 April 1983 5 | São Paulo | 2–2 | Grêmio | São Paulo |
| | Remi 32' (o.g.); Paulo César 61' | | Tita 30'; Tarciso 62' | Stadium: Estádio Cícero Pompeu de Toledo (Morumbi); Attendance: 43,164; Referee: Arnaldo César Coelho |

| 30 April 1983 6 | São Paulo | 2–0 | Sport | São Paulo |
| | Heriberto 27'; Pereyra 83' | | | Stadium: Estádio Cícero Pompeu de Toledo (Morumbi); Attendance: 50,853; Referee: José Roberto Wright |

==== Quarterfinals ====
| 4 May 1983 1 | Atlético Paranaense | 2–1 | São Paulo | Curitiba |
| | Déti 20'; Washington 45' | | Renato 36' | Stadium: Estádio Major Antônio Couto Pereira; Attendance: 38,132; Referee: Arnaldo César Coelho |

| 7 May 1983 2 | São Paulo | 0–1 | Atlético Paranaense | São Paulo |
| | | | Assis 75' | Stadium: Estádio Cícero Pompeu de Toledo (Morumbi); Attendance: 47,000; Referee: José Roberto Wright |

==== Record ====
| Final Position | Points | Matches | Wins | Draws | Losses | Goals For | Goals Away | Win% |
|---|---|---|---|---|---|---|---|---|
| 5th | 31 | 22 | 13 | 5 | 4 | 47 | 17 | 70% |

=== Campeonato Paulista ===
==== First phase ====
===== Group C =====
| Pos | Team | Pld | W | D | L | GF | GA | GD | Pts | Qualification or relegation |
|---|---|---|---|---|---|---|---|---|---|---|
| 1 | São Paulo | 38 | 19 | 14 | 5 | 56 | 30 | +26 | 52 | Qualified |
| 2 | Portuguesa | 38 | 16 | 12 | 10 | 38 | 24 | +14 | 44 | Qualified |
| 3 | Inter de Limeira | 38 | 9 | 16 | 13 | 34 | 40 | −6 | 34 | |
| 4 | XV de Jaú | 38 | 10 | 11 | 17 | 22 | 46 | −24 | 31 | |
| 5 | Taubaté | 38 | 9 | 13 | 16 | 28 | 37 | −9 | 31 | |

Updated to match(es) played on November 6, 1983. Source: RSSSF.com
Rules for classification: 1) points; 2) wins; 3) goal difference; 4) number of goals scored.

===== Matches =====
| 15 May 1983 1 | São Paulo | 2–1 | Taubaté | Morumbi |
| | Agnaldo 47'; Renato 71' | | 40' Eugênio | Stadium: Cícero Pompeu de Toledo; Attendance: 2,251; Referee: João Leopoldo Aieta |

| 18 May 1983 2 | São Paulo | 2–1 | Marília | Morumbi |
| | Careca 1', 27' | | Ademir 24' | Stadium: Cícero Pompeu de Toledo; Attendance: 1,992; Referee: Romualdo Arppi Filho |

| 22 May 1983 3 | São Bento | 1–1 | São Paulo | Sorocaba |
| | Marquinhos 45' | | Renato 8' | Stadium: Estádio Municipal Wálter Ribeiro; Attendance: 6,771; Referee: Dulcídio Wanderley Boschilia |

| 25 May 1983 4 | São Paulo | 2–0 | Santo André | Morumbi |
| | Paulo César 34'; Humberto 47' | | | Stadium: Cícero Pompeu de Toledo; Attendance: 1,530; Referee: Emídio Marques de Mesquita |

| 12 June 1983 5 | São José | 2–2 | São Paulo | São José dos Campos |
| | Tata 16'; Deda 82' | | Márcio Araújo 74'; Beto Fuscão 86' (o.g.) | Stadium: Estádio Municipal Martins Pereira; Attendance: 6,531; Referee: Ulisses Tavares |

| 19 June 1983 6 | São Paulo | 3–0 | Santos | Morumbi |
| | Renato 11', 60'; Zé Sérgio 12' | | | Stadium: Cícero Pompeu de Toledo; Attendance: 3,982; Referee: Dulcídio Wanderley Boschilia |

| 25 June 1983 7 | São Paulo | 2–0 | América | Barra Funda |
| | Renato 43'; Agnaldo 85' | | | Stadium: Estádio Palestra Itália (Parque Antarctica); Attendance: 2,721; Referee: José Fidalgo |

| 30 June 1983 8 | Comercial | 4–1 | São Paulo | Ribeirão Preto |
| | Luís Alberto 6'; Bôni 12' (o.g.); Paulinho 41'; Wilsinho 49' | | 62' Zé Mário | Stadium: Estádio Doutor Francisco de Palma Travassos; Attendance: 5,844; Referee: Almir Laguna |

| 3 July 1983 9 | Portuguesa | 1–1 | São Paulo | Mooca |
| | Mendonça 68' | | 88' Marcão | Stadium: Estádio Doutor Oswaldo Teixeira Duarte (Canindé); Attendance: 17,397; Referee: João Leopoldo Aieta |

| 6 July 1983 10 | São Paulo | 0–0 | Internacional | Barra Funda |
| | | | | Stadium: Estádio Palestra Itália (Parque Antarctica); Attendance: 2,887; Referee: José de Assis Aragão |

| 10 July 1983 11 | XV de Jaú | 0–2 | São Paulo | Jaú |
| | | | 67' Humberto; 81' Agnaldo | Stadium: Estádio Municipal José Magalhães de Almeida Prado; Attendance: 8,198; Referee: Dulcídio Wanderley Boschilia |

| 13 July 1983 12 | Juventus | 1–3 | São Paulo | Mooca |
| | Gatãozinho 69' | | 62' Renato; 81' Getúlio; 82' Marcão | Stadium: Estádio Conde Rodolfo Crespi (Rua Javari); Attendance: 7,411; Referee: João Leopoldo Aieta |

| 17 July 1983 13 | Corinthians | 1–1 | São Paulo | Morumbi |
| | Casagrande 69' | | 49' Renato | Stadium: Cícero Pompeu de Toledo; Attendance: 28,761; Referee: Emídio Marques de Mesquita |

| 24 July 1983 14 | São Paulo | 1–1 | Palmeiras | Morumbi |
| | Renato 42' | | 60' Jorginho | Stadium: Cícero Pompeu de Toledo; Attendance: 28,525; Referee: Dulcídio Wanderley Boschilia |

| 27 July 1983 15 | Taquaritinga | 1–1 | São Paulo | Taquaritinga |
| | Sena 75' | | 21' Agnaldo | Stadium: Estádio Municipal Adail Nunes da Silva; Attendance: 8,752; Referee: José de Assis Aragão |

| 31 July 1983 16 | Ponte Preta | 1–1 | São Paulo | Campinas |
| | Chicão 34' | | 21' Agnaldo | Stadium: Estádio Moisés Lucarelli; Attendance: 3,897; Referee: Romualdo Arppi Filho |

| 4 August 1983 17 | São Paulo | 1–0 | Botafogo | Morumbi |
| | Marcão 88' | | | Stadium: Cícero Pompeu de Toledo; Attendance: 1,557; Referee: Roberto Nunes Morgado |

| 6 August 1983 18 | Ferroviária | 1–1 | São Paulo | Araraquara |
| | Vica 5' | | 54' Agnaldo | Stadium: Estádio Doutor Adhemar de Barros (Fonte Luminosa); Attendance: 2,160; Referee: Romualdo Arppi Filho |

| 11 August 1983 19 | São Paulo | 0–0 | Guarani | Morumbi |
| | | | | Stadium: Cícero Pompeu de Toledo; Attendance: 2,901; Referee: Almir Laguna |

| 14 August 1983 20 | Internacional | 2–3 | São Paulo | Limeira |
| | Nelson 6'; Adílson 51' | | 36' Careca; 59' Renato; 67' Gualberto | Stadium: Estádio Municipal Major José Levy Sobrinho; Attendance: 10,260; Referee: Emídio Marques de Mesquita |

| 21 August 1983 21 | São Paulo | 0–0 | XV de Jaú | Morumbi |
| | | | | Stadium: Cícero Pompeu de Toledo; Attendance: 3,263; Referee: Luís Carlos Antunes |

| 28 August 1983 22 | São Paulo | 2–0 | Taquaritinga | Morumbi |
| | Careca 9', 48' | | | Stadium: Cícero Pompeu de Toledo; Attendance: 4,738; Referee: Antônio de Pádua Sales |

| 31 August 1983 23 | Botafogo | 1–1 | São Paulo | Ribeirão Preto |
| | Marquinhos 55' | | 56' Gassem | Stadium: Estádio Santa Cruz; Attendance: 5,884; Referee: Roberto Nunes Morgado |

| 4 September 1983 24 | São Paulo | 2–1 | Ponte Preta | Morumbi |
| | Nelsinho 65'; Renato 81' | | 54' Chicão | Stadium: Cícero Pompeu de Toledo; Attendance: 5,368; Referee: João Leopoldo Aieta |

| 11 September 1983 25 | Taubaté | 1–1 | São Paulo | Taubaté |
| | Reinaldo 63' | | 60' Marcão | Stadium: Estádio Joaquim de Morais Filho; Attendance: 5,288; Referee: Emídio Marques de Mesquita |

| 21 September 1983 26 | São Paulo | 2–0 | São José | Morumbi |
| | Getúlio 23'; Careca 42' | | | Stadium: Cícero Pompeu de Toledo; Attendance: 1,427; Referee: Ulisses Tavares |

| 27 September 1983 27 | América | 0–3 | São Paulo | São José do Rio Preto |
| | | | 7' Humberto; 35' Careca; 53' Zé Sérgio | Stadium: Estádio Anísio Haddad; Attendance: 10,278; Referee: Dulcídio Wanderley Boschilia |

| 2 October 1983 28 | São Paulo | 0–1 | Corinthians | Morumbi |
| | | | 51' Ataliba | Stadium: Cícero Pompeu de Toledo; Attendance: 27,217; Referee: Emídio Marques de Mesquita |

| 6 October 1983 29 | São Paulo | 3–0 | Comercial | Morumbi |
| | Renato 32', 44'; Agnaldo 76' | | | Stadium: Cícero Pompeu de Toledo; Attendance: 2,342; Referee: Luís Carlos Antunes |

| 9 October 1983 30 | Guarani | 0–1 | São Paulo | Campinas |
| | | | 46' Getúlio | Stadium: Estádio Brinco de Ouro da Princesa; Attendance: 3,663; Referee: Ulisses Tavares |

| 13 October 1983 31 | Santo André | 2–0 | São Paulo | Santo André |
| | Zezinho 42'; Vanderlei 49' | | | Stadium: Estádio Municipal Bruno José Daniel; Attendance: 15,692; Referee: José de Assis Aragão |

| 16 October 1983 32 | São Paulo | 3–0 | Ferroviária | Morumbi |
| | Newton 17'; Renato 36', 81' | | | Stadium: Cícero Pompeu de Toledo; Attendance: 5,240; Referee: Emídio Marques de Mesquita |

| 19 October 1983 33 | São Paulo | 1–0 | Portuguesa | Morumbi |
| | Getúlio 50' | | | Stadium: Cícero Pompeu de Toledo; Attendance: 1,879; Referee: Almir Laguna |

| 22 October 1983 34 | São Paulo | 3–1 | Juventus | Morumbi |
| | Oscar 47'; Newton 79'; Renato 86' | | 88' Claudinho | Stadium: Cícero Pompeu de Toledo; Attendance: 3,555; Referee: Romualdo Arppi Filho |

| 26 October 1983 35 | São Paulo | 0–0 | São Bento | Morumbi |
| | | | | Stadium: Cícero Pompeu de Toledo; Attendance: 2,181; Referee: José Renato de Oliveira |

| 30 October 1983 36 | Palmeiras | 1–2 | São Paulo | Morumbi |
| | Hélio 25' | | Careca 73'; Renato 87' | Stadium: Cícero Pompeu de Toledo; Attendance: 22,163; Referee: Ulisses Tavares |

| 1 November 1983 37 | Santos | 2–1 | São Paulo | Morumbi |
| | Serginho 16', 83' | | Marcão 45' | Stadium: Cícero Pompeu de Toledo; Attendance: 14,859; Referee: Luís Carlos Antunes |

| 6 November 1983 38 | Marília | 2–1 | São Paulo | Marília |
| | Candido 2'; Giba 23' | | Sídnei 50' | Stadium: Estádio Municipal Bento de Abreu Sampaio Vidal; Attendance: 6,837; Referee: Ilton José da Costa |

==== Second phase ====
===== Group F =====
| Pos | Team | Pld | W | D | L | GF | GA | GD | Pts | Qualification or relegation |
|---|---|---|---|---|---|---|---|---|---|---|
| 1 | São Paulo | 6 | 4 | 2 | 0 | 10 | 5 | +5 | 10 | Qualified |
| 2 | Palmeiras | 6 | 2 | 3 | 1 | 8 | 5 | +3 | 7 | Qualified |
| 3 | Portuguesa | 6 | 2 | 2 | 2 | 7 | 10 | −3 | 6 | |
| 4 | Santo André | 6 | 0 | 1 | 5 | 2 | 7 | −5 | 1 | |

Updated to match(es) played on December 6, 1983. Source: RSSSF.com
Rules for classification: 1) points; 2) wins; 3) goal difference; 4) number of goals scored.

===== Matches =====
| 12 November 1983 1 | Santo André | 0–1 | São Paulo | Santo André |
| | | | Oscar 54' | Stadium: Estádio Municipal Bruno José Daniel; Attendance: 5,464; Referee: Almir Laguna |

| 15 November 1983 2 | Portuguesa | 1–3 | São Paulo | São Paulo |
| | Mendonça 82' | | Paulo 48'; Zé Sérgio 51'; Careca 90+3' | Stadium: Estádio Doutor Oswaldo Teixeira Duarte (Canindé); Attendance: 28,204; Referee: Emídio Marques de Mesquita |

| 20 November 1983 3 | Palmeiras | 2–2 | São Paulo | São Paulo |
| | Enéas 51'; Luís Pereira 90+1' | | Zé Sérgio 21'; Marcão 59' | Stadium: Estádio Cícero Pompeu de Toledo (Morumbi); Attendance: 51,575; Referee: Almir Laguna |

| 23 November 1983 4 | São Paulo | 2–2 | Portuguesa | São Paulo |
| | Renato 28'; Careca 30' | | Mendonça 29'; Heriberto 75' | Stadium: Estádio Cícero Pompeu de Toledo (Morumbi); Attendance: 9,390; Referee: Dulcídio Wanderley Boschilia |

| 26 November 1983 5 | São Paulo | 1–0 | Palmeiras | São Paulo |
| | Renato 84' | | | Stadium: Estádio Cícero Pompeu de Toledo (Morumbi); Attendance: 34,849; Referee: Roberto Nunes Morgado |

| 30 November 1983 6 | São Paulo | 1–0 | Santo André | São Paulo |
| | Paulo César 29' | | | Stadium: Estádio Cícero Pompeu de Toledo (Morumbi); Attendance: 2,015; Referee: Ilton José da Costa |

==== Semifinals ====
| 3 December 1983 1 | São Paulo | 2–1 | Santos | São Paulo |
| | Marcão 56'; Pereyra 90+1' | | Serginho 75' | Stadium: Estádio Cícero Pompeu de Toledo (Morumbi); Attendance: 42,287; Referee: Dulcídio Wanderley Boschilia |

| 7 December 1983 2 | Santos | 1–1 | São Paulo | São Paulo |
| | Camargo 33' | | Zé Sérgio 29' | Stadium: Estádio Cícero Pompeu de Toledo (Morumbi); Attendance: 49,319; Referee: Roberto Nunes Morgado |

==== Finals ====
| 11 December 1983 1 | Corinthians | 1–0 | São Paulo | São Paulo |
| | Sócrates 33' | | | Stadium: Estádio Cícero Pompeu de Toledo (Morumbi); Attendance: 79,864; Referee: Dulcídio Wanderley Boschilia |

| 14 December 1983 2 | São Paulo | 1–1 | Corinthians | São Paulo |
| | Marcão 90+3' | | Sócrates 90+1' | Stadium: Estádio Cícero Pompeu de Toledo (Morumbi); Attendance: 88,085; Referee: Dulcídio Wanderley Boschilia |

==== Record ====
| Final Position | Points | Matches | Wins | Draws | Losses | Goals For | Goals Away | Win% |
|---|---|---|---|---|---|---|---|---|
| 2nd | 66 | 48 | 24 | 18 | 6 | 70 | 39 | 68% |
