= 1984 São Paulo FC season =

São Paulo
1984 season
- Chairman: José Douglas Dallora; Carlos Miguel Castex Aidar
- Manager: Mário Travaglini (until April 18); Valdir Joaquim de Moraes (caretaker, until May 29); Cilinho
- Série A: Second stage
- Campeonato Paulista: 3rd
- Top goalscorer: League: Marcão and Pianelli (4); All: Careca (14)

The 1984 season was São Paulo's 55th season since club's existence.

== Scorers ==
Position	Nation	Playing position	Name	Campeonato Brasileiro	Campeonato Paulista	Others	Total
1	(Brazil)	FW	Careca	0	12	2	14
2	(Brazil)	MF	Pita	0	10	1	11
=	(Brazil)	MF	Renato	3	7	1	11
3	(Brazil)	FW	Casagrande	0	10	0	10
4	(Brazil)	FW	Agnaldo	3	0	4	7
5	(Brazil)	MF	Pianelli	4	0	1	5
6	(Uruguay)	DF	Darío Pereyra	0	2	2	4
=	(Brazil)	FW	Geraldo	0	4	0	4
=	(Brazil)	FW	Marcão	4	0	0	4
=	(Brazil)	FW	Sídney	2	2	0	4
7	(Brazil)	FW	Jaiminho	3	0	0	3
=	(Brazil)	FW	Paulo César	0	0	3	3
8	(Brazil)	MF	Márcio Araújo	1	1	0	2
=	(Brazil)	DF	Oscar	2	0	0	2
9	(Brazil)	DF	Gassem	0	1	0	1
=	(Brazil)	DF	Paulo Roberto	1	0	0	1
=	(Brazil)	MF	Zé Mário	0	1	0	1
=	(Brazil)	FW	Zé Sérgio	0	0	1	1
			Own goals	0	2	0	2
			Total	23	52	19	94

=== Overall ===
Games played	68 (14 Campeonato Brasileiro, 38 Campeonato Paulista, 16 Friendly match)
Games won	30 (6 Campeonato Brasileiro, 19 Campeonato Paulista, 5 Friendly match)
Games drawn	25 (6 Campeonato Brasileiro, 13 Campeonato Paulista, 6 Friendly match)
Games lost	13 (2 Campeonato Brasileiro, 6 Campeonato Paulista, 5 Friendly match)
Goals scored	94
Goals conceded	54
Goal difference	+40
Best result	7–1 (A) v Londrina - Friendly match - 1984.05.26
Worst result	1–3 (A) v Marília - Campeonato Paulista - 1984.09.19; 1–3 (A) v Ferroviária - Campeonato Paulista - 1984.10.20
Top scorer	Careca (14)

Source: São Paulo FC

== Friendlies ==
February 3 International	São Paulo (Brazil)	0–0	(Italy) Roma	São Paulo
				Stadium: Estádio Cícero Pompeu de Toledo (Morumbi); Attendance: 24,902; Referee: Luís Carlos Antunes

May 6 National	Itabuna	3–4	São Paulo	Itabuna
	Goal		Goal	Stadium: Estádio Luiz Viana Filho

May 23 Torneio do Café	Palmeiras	2–0	São Paulo	Londrina
	Jorginho 27'; Luís Pereira 56'			Stadium: Estádio Municipal Jacy Scaff (do Café); Referee: Valdir Gato

May 26 Torneio do Café	Café FC	1–7	São Paulo	Londrina
	Helinho 14'		Paulo César 6', 34'; Agnaldo 38', 53', 69'; Pianelli 67'; Pereyra 72'	Stadium: Estádio Municipal Jacy Scaff (do Café); Referee: Newton Martins

June 16 National	Aparecida	0–0	São Paulo	Aparecida
				Stadium: Estádio Vicente Penido; Referee: Edson Massa

December 9 National	Mauaense	1–2	São Paulo	Mauá
	Valtinho 85'		Careca 49'; Pita 75'	Stadium: Estádio Municipal Pedro Benedetti; Referee: Dulcídio Wanderley Boschilia

August 20 International	Roma (Italy)	2–1	(Brazil) São Paulo	Rome
	Graziani 57'; Antonelli 76'		Careca 19'	Stadium: Stadio Flaminio; Referee: Redini

=== Torneio Heleno Nunes ===
April 16 National	Santa Cruz	1–2	São Paulo	Recife
	Valença 53'		Renato 54'; Pereyra 83'	Stadium: Estádio José do Rego Maciel (Arruda); Attendance: 3,339; Referee: Manuel Amaro

April 22 National	Internacional	2–0	São Paulo	Porto Alegre
	Kita 1'; Gualberto 52' (o.g.)			Stadium: Estádio José Pinheiro Borba (Beira-Rio); Attendance: 1,164; Referee: Carlos Rosa Martins

April 28 National	Palmeiras	1–0	São Paulo	São Paulo
	Carlos Alberto Borges 68'			Stadium: Estádio Municipal Paulo Machado de Carvalho (Pacaembu); Attendance: 55,000; Referee: Ulisses Tavares

May 1 National	Cruzeiro	0–0	São Paulo	Belo Horizonte
				Stadium: Estádio Governador Magalhães Pinto (Mineirão); Attendance: 2,311; Referee: Ângelo Ferrari

May 10 National	Bahia	1–1	São Paulo	Jacobina
	Osny 24'		Paulo César 85'	Stadium: Estádio Municipal José Rocha Filho; Referee: Jomar Maia

May 13 National	Sport	0–0	São Paulo	Recife
				Stadium: Estádio Adhemar da Costa Carvalho (Ilha do Retiro); Attendance: 8,071; Referee: Laerte Marquezine

May 15 National	Botafogo	0–0	São Paulo	Rio de Janeiro
				Stadium: Marechal Hermes; Attendance: 1,905; Referee: Valquir Pimentel

May 17 National	São Paulo	0–1	Atlético Mineiro	São Paulo
			Luizinho 82'	Stadium: Estádio Municipal Paulo Machado de Carvalho (Pacaembu); Attendance: 580; Referee: João Leopoldo Aieta

May 20 National	Guarani	0–2	São Paulo	Campinas
			Zé Sérgio 61'; Agnaldo 67'	Stadium: Estádio Brinco de Ouro da Princesa; Attendance: 612; Referee: Almir Peixoto

== Official competitions ==
=== Campeonato Brasileiro ===
January 29 First stage	Vasco da Gama	2–3	São Paulo	Rio de Janeiro
	Roberto Dinamite 44', 85'		Oscar 44'; Agnaldo 48', 66'	Stadium: Estádio Jornalista Mário Filho (Maracanã); Attendance: 45,287; Referee: Gílson Cordeiro

February 5 First stage	São Paulo	5–0	Fortaleza	São Paulo
	Renato 24', 77'; Paulo Roberto 50'; Jaiminho 81'; Pianelli 87'			Stadium: Estádio Cícero Pompeu de Toledo (Morumbi); Attendance: 5,632; Referee: Roque José

February 8 First stage	Nacional-AM	1–1	São Paulo	Manaus
	Bendelack 28'		Agnaldo 14'	Stadium: Estádio Vivaldo Lima (Vivaldão); Attendance: 28,488; Referee: Aristóteles Campos

February 12 First stage	Tuna Luso	0–0	São Paulo	Belém
				Stadium: Estádio Alacid Nunes (Mangueirão); Attendance: 27,037; Referee: Manuael de Lima

February 15 First stage	Fortaleza	1–0	São Paulo	Fortaleza
	Evilásio 6'			Stadium: Estádio Governador Plácido Aderaldo Castelo (Castelão); Attendance: 19,061; Referee: Armindo Tavares

February 18 First stage	São Paulo	1–1	Nacional-AM	São Paulo
	Marcão 82'		Almir 77'	Stadium: Estádio Cícero Pompeu de Toledo (Morumbi); Attendance: 4,045; Referee: Alceu Conerado

February 22 First stage	São Paulo	3–1	Tuna Luso	São Paulo
	Pianelli 56', 82'; Marcão 88'		Jorginho 67'	Stadium: Estádio Cícero Pompeu de Toledo (Morumbi); Attendance: 2,720; Referee: Tito Rodrigues

February 25 First stage	São Paulo	3–2	Vasco da Gama	São Paulo
	Marcão 5'; Márcio Araújo 21'; Jaiminho 77'		Arthurzinho 10'; Geovani 51'	Stadium: Estádio Cícero Pompeu de Toledo (Morumbi); Attendance: 10,346; Referee: Ivo Tadeu

March 11 Second stage	Goiás	2–2	São Paulo	Goiânia
	Washington 44'; Zé Ronaldo 72'		Renato 4'; Marcão 55'	Stadium: Estádio do Governo do Estado de Goiás (Serra Dourada); Attendance: 36,678; Referee: Aírton Bernardoni

March 14 Second stage	Bahia	0–0	São Paulo	Salvador
				Stadium: Estádio Octavio Mangabeira (Fonte Nova); Attendance: 20,759; Referee: Tito Rodrigues

March 18 Second stage	São Paulo	0–2	Fluminense	São Paulo
			Washington 6'; Rogério 82'	Stadium: Estádio Cícero Pompeu de Toledo (Morumbi); Attendance: 18,437; Referee: Edson Alcântara de Amorim

March 22 Second stage	São Paulo	3–2	Goiás	São Paulo
	Sidnei 3', 21'; Pianelli 8'		Cacau 1'; Nei 74'	Stadium: Estádio Cícero Pompeu de Toledo (Morumbi); Attendance: 4,204; Referee: José Roberto Wright

March 25 Second stage	Fluminense	0–0	São Paulo	Rio de Janeiro
				Stadium: Estádio Jornalista Mário Filho (Maracanã); Attendance: 33,367; Referee: Carlos Sérgio Rosa

April 1 Second stage	São Paulo	2–0	Bahia	São Paulo
	Jaiminho 3'; Oscar 5'			Stadium: Estádio Cícero Pompeu de Toledo (Morumbi); Attendance: 12,033; Referee: Arnaldo César Coelho

==== Record ====
Final Position	Points	Matches	Wins	Draws	Losses	Goals For	Goals Away	Win%
17th	18	14	6	6	2	23	14	64%

=== Campeonato Paulista ===
July 1 Round 1	São Paulo	3–0	Ferroviária	São Paulo
	Pita 61', 82', 85'			Stadium: Estádio Cícero Pompeu de Toledo (Morumbi); Attendance: 7,402; Referee: José de Assis Aragão

July 4 Round 2	América	1–0	São Paulo	São José do Rio Preto
	Formiga 25'			Stadium: Estádio Mário Alves de Mendonça; Attendance: 11,058; Referee: Dulcídio Wanderley Boschilia

July 7 Round 3	São Bento	0–2	São Paulo	Sorocaba
			Geraldo 17'; Pereyra 82'	Stadium: Estádio Municipal Wálter Ribeiro; Attendance: 4,995; Referee: Ulisses Tavares

July 11 Round 4	São Paulo	1–1	XV de Jaú	São Paulo
	Careca 81'		Toninho 38'	Stadium: Estádio Municipal Paulo Machado de Carvalho (Pacaembu); Attendance: 12,985; Referee: Roberto Nunes Morgado

July 15 Round 5	Internacional	1–1	São Paulo	Limeira
	Joílson 18'		Joílson 86' (o.g.)	Stadium: Estádio Municipal Major José Levy Sobrinho; Attendance: 11,754; Referee: Romualdo Arppi Filho

July 18 Round 6	São Paulo	2–1	Botafogo	São Paulo
	Pita 32'; Careca 65'		Gilberto Costa 81'	Stadium: Estádio Cícero Pompeu de Toledo (Morumbi); Referee: Almir Laguna

July 22 Round 7	Corinthians	2–2	São Paulo	São Paulo
	Lima 56', 71'		Gassem 16'; Sidnei 60'	Stadium: Estádio Cícero Pompeu de Toledo (Morumbi); Attendance: 31,621; Referee: Luís Carlos Antunes

July 26 Round 8	São Paulo	0–0	Taquaritinga	São Paulo
				Stadium: Estádio Cícero Pompeu de Toledo (Morumbi); Attendance: 2,269; Referee: Márcio Campos Sales

July 29 Round 9	Guarani	0–0	São Paulo	Campinas
				Stadium: Estádio Brinco de Ouro da Princesa; Attendance: 8,612; Referee: Dulcídio Wanderley Boschilia

August 1 Round 10	São Paulo	2–0	Marília	São Paulo
	Pita 59'; Careca 76'			Stadium: Estádio Municipal Paulo Machado de Carvalho (Pacaembu); Attendance: 4,514; Referee: Ilton José da Costa

August 5 Round 11	XV de Piracicaba	0–2	São Paulo	Piracicaba
			Pita 53'; Geraldo 75'	Stadium: Estádio Municipal Barão de Serra Negra; Attendance: 12,342; Referee: José de Assis Aragão

August 8 Round 12	São Paulo	1–0	Ponte Preta	São Paulo
	Careca 54'			Stadium: Estádio Cícero Pompeu de Toledo (Morumbi); Attendance: 2,670; Referee: Almir Laguna

August 12 Round 13	São Paulo	2–0	Portuguesa	São Paulo
	Donizetti 36' (o.g.); Careca 44'			Stadium: Estádio Cícero Pompeu de Toledo (Morumbi); Attendance: 14,128; Referee: Ulisses Tavares

August 25 Round 14	Santo André	0–2	São Paulo	Santo André
			Careca 53'; Márcio Araújo 62'	Stadium: Estádio Municipal Bruno José Daniel; Attendance: 4,708; Referee: Roberto Nunes Morgado

September 2 Round 15	Santos	1–4	São Paulo	São Paulo
	Lino 31'		Pita 16'; Casagrande 20', 39'; Careca 83'	Stadium: Estádio Cícero Pompeu de Toledo (Morumbi); Attendance: 56,839; Referee: João Leopoldo Aieta

September 5 Round 16	São Paulo	1–0	Taubaté	São Paulo
	Geraldo 23'			Stadium: Estádio Cícero Pompeu de Toledo (Morumbi); Attendance: 6,070; Referee: Luís Carlos Antunes

September 9 Round 17	São Paulo	1–2	Palmeiras	São Paulo
	Sidnei 35'		Reinaldo 47'; Diogo 74'	Stadium: Estádio Cícero Pompeu de Toledo (Morumbi); Attendance: 60,538; Referee: Romualdo Arppi Filho

September 12 Round 18	Juventus	1–0	São Paulo	São Paulo
	Gatãozinho 21'			Stadium: Estádio Municipal Paulo Machado de Carvalho (Pacaembu); Attendance: 7,496; Referee: Dulcídio Wanderley Boschilia

September 15 Round 19	Comercial	1–3	São Paulo	Ribeirão Preto
	Henrique 68'		Renato 54'; Careca 67'; Pita 88'	Stadium: Estádio Doutor Francisco de Palma Travassos; Attendance: 7,205; Referee: João Leopoldo Aieta

September 19 Round 20	Marília	3–1	São Paulo	Marília
	Zé Guimarães 6', 50'; Vander 52'		Casagrande 89'	Stadium: Estádio Municipal Bento de Abreu Sampaio Vidal; Attendance: 7,914; Referee: Emídio Marques de Mesquita

September 23 Round 21	São Paulo	1–0	XV de Piracicaba	São Paulo
	Casagrande 49'			Stadium: Estádio Cícero Pompeu de Toledo (Morumbi); Attendance: 5,836; Referee: Roberto Nunes Morgado

September 26 Round 22	São Paulo	1–1	Juventus	São Paulo
	Renato 6'		Cleo 32'	Stadium: Estádio Municipal Paulo Machado de Carvalho (Pacaembu); Attendance: 2,180; Referee: José de Assis Aragão

September 29 Round 23	Taubaté	1–1	São Paulo	Taubaté
	Gil 44'		Geraldo 82'	Stadium: Estádio Joaquim de Morais Filho; Attendance: 7,671; Referee: Almir Laguna

October 3 Round 24	Ponte Preta	0–2	São Paulo	Campinas
			Renato 6'; Careca 19'	Stadium: Estádio Moisés Lucarelli; Attendance: 10,917; Referee: João Leopoldo Aieta

October 7 Round 25	São Paulo	1–0	América	São Paulo
	Renato 66'			Stadium: Estádio Cícero Pompeu de Toledo (Morumbi); Attendance: 9,925; Referee: Antônio de Pádua Sales

October 10 Round 26	São Paulo	1–1	Internacional	São Paulo
	Careca 49'		João Luís 8'	Stadium: Estádio Cícero Pompeu de Toledo (Morumbi); Attendance: 3,921; Referee: Ulisses Tavares

October 14 Round 27	São Paulo	1–0	Corinthians	São Paulo
	Careca 87'			Stadium: Estádio Cícero Pompeu de Toledo (Morumbi); Attendance: 35,276; Referee: José de Assis Aragão

October 20 Round 28	Ferroviária	3–1	São Paulo	Araraquara
	Douglas Onça 35', 39', 90+5'		Pereyra 11'	Stadium: Estádio Doutor Adhemar de Barros (Fonte Luminosa); Attendance: 5,035; Referee: Ilton José da Costa

October 24 Round 29	XV de Jaú	2–1	São Paulo	Jaú
	Toninho 20', 80'		Zé Mário 74'	Stadium: Estádio Municipal José Magalhães de Almeida Prado; Attendance: 5,643; Referee: Roberto Nunes Morgado

October 28 Round 30	Portuguesa	0–0	São Paulo	São Paulo
				Stadium: Estádio Doutor Oswaldo Teixeira Duarte (Canindé); Attendance: 11,051; Referee: Ulisses Tavares

October 31 Round 31	São Paulo	3–0	Santo André	São Paulo
	Casagrande 26'; Pita 29'; Renato 32'			Stadium: Estádio Cícero Pompeu de Toledo (Morumbi); Attendance: 1,225; Referee: Roberto Nunes Morgado

November 4 Round 32	Botafogo	1–1	São Paulo	Ribeirão Preto
	Careca 74'		Marquinhos 51'	Stadium: Estádio Santa Cruz; Attendance: 6,848; Referee: Ulisses Tavares

November 11 Round 33	São Paulo	0–0	Santos	São Paulo
				Stadium: Estádio Cícero Pompeu de Toledo (Morumbi); Attendance: 30,045; Referee: Almir Laguna

November 15 Round 34	Taquaritinga	0–3	São Paulo	Taquaritinga
			Casagrande 26'; Pita 29'; Renato 32'	Stadium: Estádio Municipal Adail Nunes da Silva; Attendance: 9,573; Referee: Ulisses Tavares

November 18 Round 35	São Paulo	1–0	São Bento	São Paulo
	Casagrande 55'			Stadium: Estádio Cícero Pompeu de Toledo (Morumbi); Attendance: 2,738; Referee: Antônio Salles

November 21 Round 36	São Paulo	2–0	Comercial	São Paulo
	Casagrande 54', 78'			Stadium: Estádio Cícero Pompeu de Toledo (Morumbi); Attendance: 866; Referee: João Leopoldo Aieta

November 25 Round 37	Palmeiras	1–1	São Paulo	São Paulo
	Jorginho 62'		Casagrande 43'	Stadium: Estádio Municipal Paulo Machado de Carvalho (Pacaembu); Attendance: 14,287; Referee: Luís Carlos Antunes

December 1 Round 38	São Paulo	1–1	Guarani	São Paulo
	Renato 7'		Nei 33'	Stadium: Estádio Municipal Paulo Machado de Carvalho (Pacaembu); Attendance: 964; Referee: Márcio Campos Sales

==== Record ====
Final Position	Points	Matches	Wins	Draws	Losses	Goals For	Goals Away	Win%
3rd	51	38	19	13	6	52	25	67%
