= 1981 São Paulo FC season =

São Paulo
1981 season
- Chairman: Antônio Leme Nunes Galvão
- Manager: Carlos Alberto Silva (until June 10); João Leal Neto (caretaker, until July 7); Chico Formiga
- Série A: Runners-up
- Campeonato Paulista: Champions (13th title)
- Top goalscorer: League: Serginho (11); All: Serginho (32)

The 1981 season was São Paulo's 52nd season since club's existence.

== Statistics ==
=== Scorers ===
Position	Nation	Playing position	Name	Campeonato Brasileiro	Campeonato Paulista	Others	Total
1	(Brazil)	FW	Serginho	11	20	1	32
2	(Brazil)	MF	Éverton	10	11	0	21
3	(Brazil)	MF	Renato	0	16	4	20
4	(Brazil)	FW	Paulo César	3	5	3	11
5	(Brazil)	FW	Tatu	1	8	1	10
6	(Brazil)	DF	Getúlio	1	6	0	7
7	(Brazil)	FW	Assis	3	0	0	3
=	(Uruguay)	DF	Darío Pereyra	0	2	1	3
=	(Brazil)	MF	Mário Sérgio	0	3	0	3
=	(Brazil)	MF	Valtinho	0	3	0	3
8	(Brazil)	FW	Édson	0	2	0	2
=	(Brazil)	MF	Élvio	0	2	0	2
9	(Brazil)	MF	Almir	1	0	0	1
=	(Brazil)	DF	Chiquito	1	0	0	1
=	(Brazil)	MF	Heriberto	0	1	0	1
=	(Brazil)	DF	Marinho Chagas	0	1	0	1
=	(Brazil)	MF	Marquinhos	1	0	0	1
=	(Brazil)	DF	Oscar	0	1	0	1
			Own goals	0	1	0	1
			Total	32	82	10	124

=== Overall ===
Games played	89 (23 Campeonato Brasileiro, 56 Campeonato Paulista, 10 Friendly match)
Games won	45 (13 Campeonato Brasileiro, 28 Campeonato Paulista, 4 Friendly match)
Games drawn	22 (6 Campeonato Brasileiro, 12 Campeonato Paulista, 4 Friendly match)
Games lost	22 (4 Campeonato Brasileiro, 16 Campeonato Paulista, 2 Friendly match)
Goals scored	124
Goals conceded	71
Goal difference	+53
Best result	6–2 (H) v Palmeiras - Campeonato Paulista - 1981.10.4
Worst result	0–3 (A) v Palmeiras - Campeonato Paulista - 1981.5.17
Top scorer	Serginho (32)

Source: São Paulo FC

== Friendlies ==
January 14 Troféu Anos de Ouro	São Paulo (São Paulo (state))	0–2	(Rio de Janeiro (state)) Flamengo	São Paulo
			Adílio 30'; Nunes 88'	Stadium: Estádio Cícero Pompeu de Toledo (Morumbi); Referee: Roberto Nunes Morgado

February 12 National	Santo André (São Paulo (state))	1–0	(São Paulo (state)) São Paulo	Santo André
	Bona 8'			Stadium: Estádio Municipal Bruno José Daniel; Attendance: 10,385; Referee: Romualdo Arppi Filho

March 5 International	São Paulo (Brazil)	3–1	(United States) New York Cosmos	São Paulo
	Renato 7', 84'; Paulo César 8'		Chinaglia 65'	Stadium: Estádio Cícero Pompeu de Toledo (Morumbi); Attendance: 23,906; Referee: Emídio Marques de Mesquita

May 21 International	Milan (Italy)	1–2	(Brazil) São Paulo	Milan
	Carotti 88'		Paulo César 39'; Renato 81'	Stadium: San Siro

May 26 Trofeo FMF	Mexico	0–3	(Brazil) São Paulo	Mexico City
			Serginho 39'; Renato 61'; Valtinho 82'	Stadium: Estadio Azteca

May 28 International	Tecos UAG (Mexico)	0–0	(Brazil) São Paulo	Los Angeles
				Stadium: Los Angeles Coliseum; Attendance: 10,053

June 2 International	Fort Lauderdale Strikers (United States)	3–3	(Brazil) São Paulo	Fort Lauderdale
	Moráles 39', 80' (pen.); Hölzenbein 62'		Pereyra 23'; Paulo César 90'; Serginho 90+6'	Stadium: Lockhart Stadium

June 4 International	New York Cosmos (United States)	2–2	(Brazil) São Paulo	Meadowlands
	Chinaglia 12'; DiBernardo 17'		Renato 59'; Tatu 90+3'	Stadium: Giants Stadium; Attendance: 53,617; Referee: Ivo Hipólito

September 22 Troféu Nabi Abi Chedid	São Paulo (Brazil)	5–1	Saudi Arabia	São Paulo
	Éverton 10', 12'; Paulo César 15', 84', 86'		Shaiab Al-Nasissa 20'	Stadium: Estádio Cícero Pompeu de Toledo (Morumbi); Referee: José de Assis Aragão

December 6 National	São Paulo FC (São Paulo (state))	3–4	(São Paulo (state)) São Paulo	São Paulo
	Renato 4'; Dario Pereyra 22'; Serginho 34'	Report	Jorge Mendonça 11', 86'; Careca 46'; Lela 79'	Stadium: Estádio Cícero Pompeu de Toledo (Morumbi); Attendance: 7,743; Referee: Dulcidio Vanderlei Boschilia

== Official competitions ==
=== Campeonato Brasileiro ===
January 18 First phase - Group C	Sport	0–0	São Paulo	Recife
				Stadium: Ilha do Retiro; Attendance: 10,375; Referee: José Roberto Wright

January 21 First phase - Group C	América-RN	1–1	São Paulo	Natal
	Marinho 90'		Éverton 62'	Stadium: Estádio Municipal Marechal Castelo Branco; Attendance: 15,248; Referee: Valquir Pimentel

January 24 First phase - Group C	São Paulo	4–0	Mixto	São Paulo
	Éverton 22', 48' (pen.); Paulo César 71'; Assis 72'			Stadium: Estádio Cícero Pompeu de Toledo (Morumbi); Attendance: 8,072; Referee: Maurílio José Santiago

January 28 First phase - Group C	Ríver-PI	0–2	São Paulo	Teresina
			Paulo César 18'; Marquinhos 25'	Stadium: Estádio Governador Alberto Tavares Silva; Attendance: 9,425; Referee: José Leandro de Castro Serpa

February 1 First phase - Group C	CSA	2–2	São Paulo	Maceió
	Luís Paulo 20'; Dentinho 78'		Assis 33'; Chiquito 45'	Stadium: Estádio Rei Pelé; Attendance: 21,503; Referee: Manuel Serapião Filho

February 4 First phase - Group C	São Paulo	0–0	Ferroviário	São Paulo
				Stadium: Estádio Cícero Pompeu de Toledo (Morumbi); Attendance: 7,195; Referee: Luíz Zetterman Torres

February 7 First phase - Group C	Campinense	0–0	São Paulo	Campina Grande
				Stadium: Estádio Governador Ernani Satyro (Amigão); Attendance: 16,710; Referee: Carlos Sérgio Rosa Martins

February 15 First phase - Group C	São Paulo	2–1	Atlético Mineiro	São Paulo
	Éverton 41'; Almir 75'		Carlinhos 84'	Stadium: Estádio Cícero Pompeu de Toledo (Morumbi); Attendance: 18.014; Referee: Arnaldo César Coelho

February 21 First phase - Group C	São Paulo	2–1	Fluminense	São Paulo
	Éverton 26' (pen.); Assis 35'		Mário 66'	Stadium: Estádio Cícero Pompeu de Toledo (Morumbi); Attendance: 16,155; Referee: Carlos Sérgio Rosa Martins

March 8 Second phase - Group I	São Paulo	3–0	Grêmio	São Paulo
	Serginho 16', 60', 80'			Stadium: Estádio Cícero Pompeu de Toledo (Morumbi); Attendance: 34,301; Referee: José Roberto Wright

March 12 Second phase - Group I	Internacional-SP	1–1	São Paulo	Limeira
	Elói 85' (pen.)		Éverton 53'	Stadium: Estádio Major José Levy Sobrinho; Attendance: 12,222; Referee: Arnaldo César Coelho

March 15 Second phase - Group I	São Paulo	1–0	Fortaleza	São Paulo
	Tatu 6'			Stadium: Estádio Cícero Pompeu de Toledo (Morumbi); Attendance: 12,541; Referee: Saul Mendes

March 21 Second phase - Group I	Grêmio	1–0	São Paulo	Porto Alegre
	Baltazar 70'			Stadium: Estádio Olímpico Monumental; Attendance: 27,999; Referee: Bráulio Zanotto

April 1 Second phase - Group I	São Paulo	2–1	Internacional-SP	São Paulo
	Serginho 22'; Getúlio 58' (pen.)		Elói 28'	Stadium: Estádio Cícero Pompeu de Toledo (Morumbi); Attendance: 32,171; Referee: Hélio Cosso

April 4 Second phase - Group I	Fortaleza	0–1	São Paulo	Fortaleza
			Éverton 80'	Stadium: Estádio Governador Plácido Aderaldo Castelo (Castelão); Attendance: 5,638; Referee: Arnaldo César Coelho

April 8 Round of 16	Santos	0–2	São Paulo	São Paulo
			Serginho 40' (pen.), 58'	Stadium: Estádio Municipal Paulo Machado de Carvalho (Pacaembu); Attendance: 45,433; Referee: Wilson Carlos dos Santos

April 12 Round of 16	São Paulo	2–1	Santos	São Paulo
	Paulo César 49'; Serginho 54'		Pita 45+2'	Stadium: Estádio Cícero Pompeu de Toledo (Morumbi); Attendance: 59,766; Referee: José Roberto Wright

April 16 Quarterfinals	Internacional	0–1	São Paulo	Porto Alegre
			Éverton 46'	Stadium: Estádio José Pinheiro Borba (Beira-Rio); Attendance: 54,354; Referee: Wilson Carlos dos Santos

April 19 Quarterfinals	São Paulo	2–0	Internacional	São Paulo
	Serginho 49', 59'			Stadium: Estádio Cícero Pompeu de Toledo (Morumbi); Attendance: 70,993; Referee: Arnaldo César Coelho

April 22 Semifinals	Botafogo	1–0	São Paulo	Rio de Janeiro
	Marcelo 63'			Stadium: Estádio Jornalista Mário Filho (Maracanã); Attendance: 97.473; Referee: Manuel Serapião Filho

April 26 Semifinals	São Paulo	3–2	Botafogo	São Paulo
	Serginho 44' (pen.); Éverton 66', 77'		Jérson 10'; Mendonça 18'	Stadium: Estádio Cícero Pompeu de Toledo (Morumbi); Attendance: 98,650; Referee: Bráulio Zanotto

April 30 Finals	Grêmio	2–1	São Paulo	Porto Alegre
	Paulo Isidoro 55', 69'		Serginho 39'	Stadium: Estádio Olímpico Monumental; Attendance: 53,388; Referee: Arnaldo César Coelho

May 3 Finals	São Paulo	0–1	Grêmio	São Paulo
			Baltazar 64'	Stadium: Estádio Cícero Pompeu de Toledo (Morumbi); Attendance: 95,106; Referee: José Roberto Wright

==== Record ====
Final Position	Points	Matches	Wins	Draws	Losses	Goals For	Goals Away	Win%
2nd	32	23	13	6	4	32	15	69%

=== Campeonato Paulista ===
May 6 First stage 1	Botafogo	1–0	São Paulo	Ribeirão Preto
	Osmarzinho 50'			Stadium: Estádio Santa Cruz; Attendance: 5,566; Referee: Márcio Campos Sales

May 9 First stage 2	São Paulo	0–0	Portuguesa	São Paulo
				Stadium: Estádio Municipal Paulo Machado de Carvalho (Pacaembu); Attendance: 7,017; Referee: Romualdo Arppi Filho

May 12 First stage 3	Francana	0–3	São Paulo	Franca
			Heriberto 3'; Valtinho 30'; Paulo César 64'	Stadium: Estádio Municipal Doutor José Lancha Filho; Attendance: 7,508; Referee: Almir Ricci Peixoto Laguna

May 14 First stage 4	São Paulo	0–0	Noroeste	São Paulo
				Stadium: Estádio Municipal Paulo Machado de Carvalho (Pacaembu); Attendance: 2,246; Referee: Ulisses Tavares da Silva Filho

May 17 First stage 5	Palmeiras	3–0	São Paulo	São Paulo
	Paulinho 43'; Aragonés 73'; Romeu 83'			Stadium: Estádio Municipal Paulo Machado de Carvalho (Pacaembu); Attendance: 22,613; Referee: Oscar Scolfaro

June 7 First stage 6	São José	0–0	São Paulo	São José dos Campos
				Stadium: Estádio Municipal Martins Pereira; Attendance: 16,895; Referee: Ulisses Tavares da Silva Filho

June 9 First stage 7	Juventus	0–0	São Paulo	São Paulo
				Stadium: Estádio Rua Javari; Attendance: 6,591; Referee: Romualdo Arppi Filho

June 11 First stage 8	São Paulo	1–2	Ferroviária	São Paulo
	Renato 86'		Washington 23'; Sílvio 83'	Stadium: Estádio Municipal Paulo Machado de Carvalho (Pacaembu); Attendance: 1,886; Referee: João Leopoldo Ayeta

June 14 First stage 9	São Paulo	3–0	Santos	São Paulo
	Renato 40'; Tatu 50'; Élvio 65'			Stadium: Estádio Cícero Pompeu de Toledo (Morumbi); Attendance: 17,168; Referee: Emídio Marques de Mesquita

June 16 First stage 10	São Paulo	0–1	Comercial	São Paulo
			João Batista 51'	Stadium: Estádio Cícero Pompeu de Toledo (Morumbi); Attendance: 1,252; Referee: Dulcídio Wanderley Boschilia

June 18 First stage 11	XV de Jaú	1–1	São Paulo	Jaú
	Cardim 52'		Renato 27'	Stadium: Estádio Municipal José Magalhães de Almeida Prado; Attendance: 9,064; Referee: Márcio Campos Sales

June 21 First stage 12	Ponte Preta	2–1	São Paulo	Campinas
	Édson 37'; Nenê 48' (pen.)		Tatu 73'	Stadium: Estádio Moisés Lucarelli; Attendance: 12,084; Referee: Almir Ricci Peixoto Laguna

June 23 First stage 13	São Paulo	0–1	América	São Paulo
			Paulinho Cascavel 76'	Stadium: Estádio Cícero Pompeu de Toledo (Morumbi); Attendance: 1,451; Referee: Antônio de Paula e Silva

June 25 First stage 14	Internacional	0–3	São Paulo	Limeira
			Élvio 38'; Renato 46'; Éverton 90+3'	Stadium: Estádio Municipal Major José Levy Sobrinho; Attendance: 17,202; Referee: Dulcídio Wanderley Boschilia

June 28 First stage 15	São Paulo	2–1	Corinthians	São Paulo
	Éverton 85'; Valtinho 88'		Joãozinho 77'	Stadium: Estádio Municipal Paulo Machado de Carvalho (Pacaembu); Attendance: 32,759; Referee: Oscar Scolfaro

June 30 First stage 16	São Paulo	0–1	Taubaté	São Paulo
			Mirandinha 52'	Stadium: Estádio Municipal Paulo Machado de Carvalho (Pacaembu); Attendance: 5,029; Referee: Joel Teixeira Caires

July 2 First stage 17	São Paulo	1–0	São Bento	São Paulo
	Getúlio 69'			Stadium: Estádio Palestra Itália (Parque Antarctica); Attendance: 251; Referee: Luís Carlos Antunes

July 5 First stage 18	Marília	1–4	São Paulo	Marília
	Edel 53'		Édson 12', 77'; Éverton 38', 50'	Stadium: Estádio Municipal Bento de Abreu Sampaio Vidal; Attendance: 5,625; Referee: Osvaldo dos Santos Ramos

July 7 First stage 19	São Paulo	1–0	Guarani	São Paulo
	Serginho 69'			Stadium: Estádio Municipal Paulo Machado de Carvalho (Pacaembu); Attendance: 1,235; Referee: Ezequiel Pedroso

July 12 Group stage 1	Francana	1–4	São Paulo	Franca
	Zé Guimarães 81' (pen.)		Pereyra 39'; Renato 40', 47'; Paulo César 64'	Stadium: Estádio Municipal Doutor José Lancha Filho; Attendance: 5,595; Referee: João Leopoldo Ayeta

July 15 Group stage 2	São Paulo	4–1	Noroeste	São Paulo
	Getúlio 13'; Renato 39', 87'; Tatu 64'		Wallace 81' (pen.)	Stadium: Estádio Municipal Paulo Machado de Carvalho (Pacaembu); Attendance: 7,611; Referee: Romualdo Arppi Filho

July 19 Group stage 3	Taubaté	1–0	São Paulo	Taubaté
	Adílson 73'			Stadium: Estádio Joaquim de Morais Filho; Attendance: 10,317; Referee: José de Assis Aragão

July 22 Group stage 4	São Paulo	0–1	Taubaté	São Paulo
			Mirandinha 65'	Stadium: Estádio Municipal Paulo Machado de Carvalho (Pacaembu); Attendance: 7,292; Referee: Ulisses Tavares da Silva Filho

July 26 Group stage 5	Noroeste	1–2	São Paulo	Bauru
	Jenildo 48'		Serginho 14', 69'	Stadium: Estádio Doutor Alfredo de Castilho; Attendance: 4,221; Referee: José de Assis Aragão

July 29 Group stage 6	São Paulo	2–0	Francana	São Paulo
	Serginho 52'; Tatu 84'			Stadium: Estádio Municipal Paulo Machado de Carvalho (Pacaembu); Attendance: 6,089; Referee: João Leopoldo Ayeta

August 2 Final group stage 1	São Paulo	1–0	Palmeiras	São Paulo
	Tatu 82'			Stadium: Estádio Cícero Pompeu de Toledo (Morumbi); Attendance: 29,366; Referee: Oscar Scolfaro

August 4 Final group stage 2	Corinthians	1–1	São Paulo	São Paulo
	Sócrates 16' (pen.)		Éverton 57' (pen.)	Stadium: Estádio Cícero Pompeu de Toledo (Morumbi); Attendance: 34,852; Referee: Romualdo Arppi Filho

August 9 Second stage 1	São Bento	1–0	São Paulo	Sorocaba
	Nei 86'			Stadium: Estádio Municipal Wálter Ribeiro; Attendance: 8,704; Referee: Emídio Marques de Mesquita

August 12 Second stage 2	São Paulo	3–0	São José	São Paulo
	Serginho 18' (pen.); Renato 50'; Paulo César 72'			Stadium: Estádio Cícero Pompeu de Toledo (Morumbi); Attendance: 2,152; Referee: Osvaldo dos Santos Ramos

August 16 Second stage 3	São Paulo	3–0	Botafogo	São Paulo
	Tatu 2'; Serginho 5'; Renato 19'			Stadium: Estádio Cícero Pompeu de Toledo (Morumbi); Attendance: 15,542; Referee: Emídio Marques de Mesquita

August 19 Second stage 4	Noroeste	0–3	São Paulo	Bauru
			Getúlio 50'; Tatu 78'; Valtinho 85'	Stadium: Estádio Doutor Alfredo de Castilho; Attendance: 6,830; Referee: Romualdo Arppi Filho

August 23 Second stage 5	Ferroviária	1–0	São Paulo	Araraquara
	Sílvio 19'			Stadium: Estádio Doutor Adhemar de Barror (Fonte Luminosa); Attendance: 8,773; Referee: Oscar Scolfaro

August 30 Second stage 6	São Paulo	1–2	Ponte Preta	São Paulo
	Serginho 44'		Dicá 14'; Serginho 63'	Stadium: Estádio Cícero Pompeu de Toledo (Morumbi); Attendance: 34,280; Referee: Márcio Campos Sales

September 3 Second stage 7	Portuguesa	1–1	São Paulo	São Paulo
	Gérson Sodré 45+1'		Paulo César 9'	Stadium: Estádio Cícero Pompeu de Toledo (Morumbi); Attendance: 7,550; Referee: José de Assis Aragão

September 6 Second stage 8	Guarani	3–2	São Paulo	Campinas
	Ernâni Banana 21'; Jorge Mendonça 65', 73'		Serginho 84'; Mário Sérgio 87'	Stadium: Estádio Brinco de Ouro da Princesa; Attendance: 12,880; Referee: Dulcídio Wanderley Boschilia

September 9 Second stage 9	São Paulo	3–0	Francana	São Paulo
	Serginho 47'; Getúlio 55'; Renato 69'			Stadium: Estádio Cícero Pompeu de Toledo (Morumbi); Attendance: 4,384; Referee: Emídio Marques de Mesquita

September 13 Second stage 10	Taubaté	1–2	São Paulo	Taubaté
	Lira 43'		Renato 40'; Serginho 76'	Stadium: Estádio Joaquim de Morais Filho; Attendance: 10,846; Referee: João Leopoldo Ayeta

September 16 Second stage 11	São Paulo	2–0	XV de Jaú	São Paulo
	Oscar 2'; Serginho 74'			Stadium: Estádio Cícero Pompeu de Toledo (Morumbi); Attendance: 5,481; Referee: Ulisses Tavares da Silva Filho

September 20 Second stage 12	São Paulo	1–1	Corinthians	São Paulo
	Getúlio 2'		Biro-Biro 36'	Stadium: Estádio Cícero Pompeu de Toledo (Morumbi); Attendance: 37,509; Referee: Romualdo Arppi Filho

September 26 Second stage 13	Comercial	2–1	São Paulo	Ribeirão Preto
	Mauricinho 12'; Carlos 68'		Estevam 6' (o.g.)	Stadium: Estádio Doutor Francisco de Palma Travassos; Attendance: 6,915; Referee: Ulisses Tavares da Silva Filho

September 30 Second stage 14	São Paulo	2–1	Juventus	São Paulo
	Serginho 11'; Éverton 43'		Trajano 13'	Stadium: Estádio Cícero Pompeu de Toledo (Morumbi); Attendance: 1,229; Referee: Emídio Marques de Mesquita

October 4 Second stage 15	São Paulo	6–2	Palmeiras	São Paulo
	Éverton 26'; Mário Sérgio 58', 69'; Renato 60'; Serginho 65'; Paulo César 67'		Aírton 39' (o.g.); Enéas 77'	Stadium: Estádio Cícero Pompeu de Toledo (Morumbi); Attendance: 31,799; Referee: Oscar Scolfaro

October 7 Second stage 16	São Paulo	2–1	Marília	São Paulo
	Tatu 12'; Éverton 73'		João Carlos 1'	Stadium: Estádio Cícero Pompeu de Toledo (Morumbi); Attendance: 3,812; Referee: José de Assis Aragão

October 11 Second stage 17	América	0–1	São Paulo	São José do Rio Preto
			Renato 59'	Stadium: Estádio Mário Alves de Mendonça; Attendance: 11,896; Referee: João Leopoldo Ayeta

October 14 Second stage 18	São Paulo	0–0	Internacional	São Paulo
				Stadium: Estádio Cícero Pompeu de Toledo (Morumbi); Attendance: 6,143; Referee: Antônio de Pádua Sales

October 18 Second stage 19	Santos	2–3	São Paulo	São Paulo
	Pita 82'; Chicão 87'		Serginho 31' (pen.), 41' (76)	Stadium: Estádio Cícero Pompeu de Toledo (Morumbi); Attendance: 39,619; Referee: João Leopoldo Ayeta

October 25 Group stage 1	Corinthians	0–2	São Paulo	São Paulo
			Serginho 22'; Éverton 25'	Stadium: Estádio Cícero Pompeu de Toledo (Morumbi); Attendance: 71,965; Referee: José de Assis Aragão

October 31 Group stage 2	Guarani	1–1	São Paulo	Campinas
	Jorge Mendonça 26'		Éverton 45'	Stadium: Estádio Brinco de Ouro da Princesa; Attendance: 14,196; Referee: Márcio Campos Sales

November 5 Group stage 3	São Paulo	1–0	XV de Jaú	São Paulo
	Renato 60'			Stadium: Estádio Cícero Pompeu de Toledo (Morumbi); Attendance: 12,611; Referee: João Leopoldo Ayeta

November 8 Group stage 4	São Paulo	1–1	Guarani	São Paulo
	Jorge Mendonça 36'		Serginho 55'	Stadium: Estádio Cícero Pompeu de Toledo (Morumbi); Attendance: 29,835; Referee: Ulisses Tavares da Silva Filho

November 11 Group stage 5	XV de Jaú	0–1	São Paulo	Jaú
			Éverton 39'	Stadium: Estádio Municipal José Magalhães de Almeida Prado; Attendance: 5,607; Referee: Dulcídio Wanderley Boschilia

November 15 Group stage 6	São Paulo	0–1	Corinthians	São Paulo
			Zenon 24'	Stadium: Estádio Cícero Pompeu de Toledo (Morumbi); Attendance: 11,669; Referee: Almir Ricci Peixoto Laguna

November 18 Semifinals	São José	1–0	São Paulo	São José dos Campos
	Ademir Melo 76'			Stadium: Estádio Municipal Martins Pereira; Attendance: 14,737; Referee: Dulcídio Wanderley Boschilia

November 22 Semifinals	São Paulo	3–2	São José	São Paulo
	Marinho Chagas 22'; Pereyra 28'; Getúlio 56' (pen.)		Tata 35'; Esquerdinha 76'	Stadium: Estádio Cícero Pompeu de Toledo (Morumbi); Attendance: 56,623; Referee: José de Assis Aragão

November 25 Final	São Paulo	1–1	Ponte Preta	São Paulo
	Serginho 66'		Toninho Oliveira 25'	Stadium: Estádio Cícero Pompeu de Toledo (Morumbi); Attendance: 38,163; Referee: Dulcídio Wanderley Boschilla

November 29 Final	São Paulo	2–0	Ponte Preta	São Paulo
	Renato 37'; Serginho 86'			Stadium: Estádio Cícero Pompeu de Toledo (Morumbi); Attendance: 63,841; Referee: Dulcídio Wanderley Boschilla

==== Record ====
Final Position	Points	Matches	Wins	Draws	Losses	Goals For	Goals Away	Win%
1st	68	56	28	12	16	82	45	60%
