= Marlon (footballer, born 1990) =

Brazilian footballer

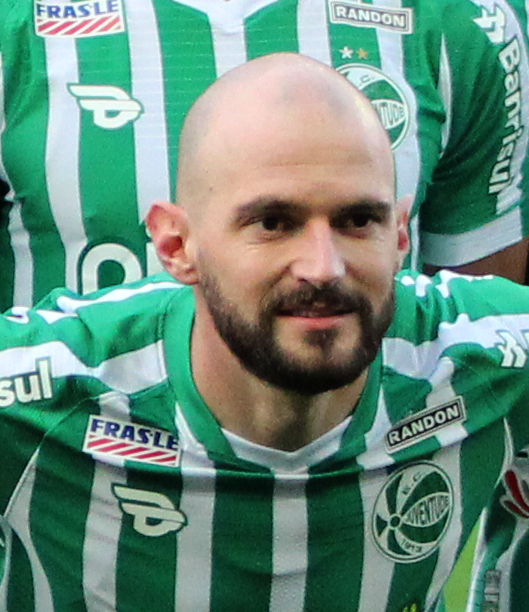
- Marlon with Juventude in 2022

Personal information
- Full name: Marlon Adriano Prezotti
- Date of birth: 26 February 1990 (age 36)
- Place of birth: Curitiba, Brazil
- Height: 1.75 m (5 ft 9 in)
- Position: Midfielder

Team information
- Current team: Novorizontino
- Number: 28

Youth career
- 2006–2008: Villa Nova
- 2008–2009: Cruzeiro

Senior career*
Years	Team	Apps	(Gls)
2009–2011	Cruzeiro	0	(0)
2009–2010	→ Villa Nova (loan)	9	(0)
2011	→ Formiga (loan)	15	(2)
2012	Francana	16	(1)
2012	Esportiva Guaxupé	13	(2)
2013	Mamoré	9	(0)
2013–2014	Sertãozinho	2	(0)
2014	Santa Rita	11	(0)
2014–2016	ASA	27	(2)
2016–2017	Caxias	37	(4)
2017–2018	Sampaio Corrêa	26	(4)
2018–2020	Fortaleza	74	(4)
2021–2022	Ceará	30	(1)
2022	Juventude	10	(0)
2023–	Novorizontino	122	(7)
- * Club domestic league appearances and goals as of 17 November 2026

Marlon Adriano Prezotti (born 26 February 1990), simply known as Marlon, is a Brazilian professional footballer who plays as a midfielder for Novorizontino.

== Club career ==
Born in Curitiba, Paraná, Marlon left his hometown at the age of 16 and subsequently joined Villa Nova's youth setup. In 2008, he moved to Cruzeiro, but returned to his former side Villa Nova on loan in the following year.

Marlon made his professional debut on 2 March 2009, coming on as a second-half substitute for Wander Luiz in a 0–1 Campeonato Mineiro away loss against Uberaba. After featuring rarely, he subsequently served another loan stint at Formiga in 2011 before signing for Francana in 2012.

In June 2013, after representing Esportiva Guaxupé and Mamoré, Marlon moved to Sertãozinho. He then moved to Santa Rita for the 2014 Campeonato Alagoano before signing for ASA in May of that year.

On 13 January 2016, Marlon was presented at Caxias. He won the Campeonato Gaúcho Série A2 in that year with the club, and moved to Série C side Sampaio Corrêa in May 2017.

On 3 May 2018, Marlon agreed to a two-year deal with Fortaleza in the Série B, after the club paid his R$200,000 release clause. He quickly established as a regular starter for the side, helping in their promotion to the Série A and the subsequent two Campeonato Cearense titles, aside from the 2019 Copa do Nordeste winning campaign.

On 17 February 2021, free agent Marlon signed a two-year contract with Fortaleza's rivals Ceará.

== Career statistics ==
As of 25 October 2021

Club	Season	League			State League		Cup		Continental		Other		Total	
Club	Season	Division	Apps	Goals	Apps	Goals	Apps	Goals	Apps	Goals	Apps	Goals	Apps	Goals
Villa Nova	2009	Mineiro	—		4	0	—		—		2 (Note: Appearance(s) in Taça Minas Gerais)	0	6	0
Villa Nova	2010	Mineiro	—		5	0	—		—		—		5	0
Villa Nova	Subtotal		—		9	0	—		—		2	0	11	0
Formiga	2011	Mineiro Módulo II	—		15	2	—		—		—		15	2
Francana	2012	Paulista A3	—		16	2	—		—		—		16	2
Esportiva Guaxupé	2012	Mineiro 2ª Divisão	—		13	2	—		—		—		13	2
Mamoré	2013	Mineiro Módulo II	—		9	0	—		—		—		9	0
Sertãozinho	2013	Paulista A3	—		0	0	—		—		11 (Note: Appearance(s) in Copa Paulista)	0	11	0
Sertãozinho	2014	Paulista A3	—		2	0	—		—		—		2	0
Sertãozinho	Subtotal		—		2	0	—		—		11	0	13	0
Santa Rita	2014	Alagoano	—		11	0	4	1	—		—		15	1
ASA	2014	Série C	6	0	—		—		—		—		6	0
ASA	2015	Série C	12	1	9	1	1	0	—		—		22	2
ASA	Subtotal		18	1	9	1	1	0	—		—		28	2
Caxias	2016	Série D	6	0	19	2	—		—		—		25	2
Caxias	2017	Gaúcho	—		12	2	—		—		—		12	2
Caxias	Subtotal		6	0	31	4	—		—		—		37	4
Sampaio Corrêa	2017	Série C	18	2	—		—		—		—		18	2
Sampaio Corrêa	2018	Série B	3	0	5	1	4	1	—		7 (Note: Appearance(s) in Copa do Nordeste)	1	19	3
Sampaio Corrêa	Subtotal		21	2	5	1	4	1	—		7	1	37	5
Fortaleza	2018	Série B	30	3	—		—		—		—		30	3
Fortaleza	2019	Série A	19	0	4	0	2	0	—		5	0	30	0
Fortaleza	2020	Série A	16	0	5	0	2	0	2 (Note: Appearance(s) in Copa Sudamericana)	1	8	0	33	1
Fortaleza	Subtotal		65	3	9	0	4	0	2	1	13	0	93	4
Ceará	2021	Série A	21	0	2	0	1	0	4	0	9	0	37	0
Career total			131	6	131	12	14	2	6	1	42	1	324	22

== Honours ==
Caxias

- Campeonato Gaúcho Série A2: 2016

Fortaleza

- Campeonato Brasileiro Série B: 2018
- Campeonato Cearense: 2019, 2020
- Copa do Nordeste: 2019

Novorizontino

- Campeonato Brasileiro Série B: 2026
