= Chiquito =

Chiquito is the name of:

- Chiquito (actor) (1932–1997), Filipino comedic film actor
- Chiquito (footballer) Francisco Vieira da Silva, (born 1954), Brazilian footballer
- Érick Sánchez, a Mexican footballer commonly referred to as Chiquito
- Chiquito do Carmo (born 1986), East Timorese footballer
- Chiquito (restaurant), a chain of UK restaurants specialising Mexican foods
- Chiquito (Medal of Honor), Native American enlistee in the United States Army
- Chiquito (Tintin character), a character in The Adventures of Tintin
- Chiquito de la Calzada (1932–2017), Spanish comedian
- Chiquito (restaurant), a restaurant chain in the United Kingdom
- Chiquito, a song by Arca from Kick IIIII

== Other ==
- Chiquito River (disambiguation)

== Chiquitos ==
- Chiquitos, a Spanish name given to the ethnic peoples of part of Bolivia
