= Márcio Araújo (footballer, born 1960) =

Brazilian football manager

Personal information
- Full name: Márcio Longo de Araújo
- Date of birth: 7 May 1960 (age 66)
- Place of birth: São José do Rio Pardo, Brazil
- Height: 1.81 m (5 ft 11 in)
- Positions: Centre back; defensive midfielder

Youth career
- São Paulo

Senior career*
Years	Team	Apps	(Gls)
1978–1986	São Paulo	171	(6)
1982	→ São Bento (loan)		
1987	Noroeste		
1988–1990	Portuguesa		
1991	Coritiba	5	(0)

Managerial career
- 1991: Ponte Preta U23
- 1992–1993: São Paulo U20
- 1993–1994: Corinthians U20
- 1993: Corinthians (interim)
- 1995–1996: Palmeiras (assistant)
- 1997: Palmeiras
- 1998: Inter de Limeira
- 1998: Paraná
- 1999: Paraná
- 1999: Coritiba
- 2000: Atlético Mineiro
- 2000–2001: Rio Claro
- 2001: Palmeiras
- 2002: Rio Claro
- 2003: Guaratinguetá
- 2003: Fortaleza
- 2004: Cruzeiro (assistant)
- 2005: Avaí
- 2005–2006: Coritiba
- 2007: Rio Claro
- 2007: Guaratinguetá
- 2007: Goiás
- 2008: Grêmio Barueri
- 2008: Grêmio Barueri
- 2009: Guaratinguetá
- 2009: Figueirense
- 2010: Sertãozinho
- 2010: Bahia
- 2011–2012: São Caetano
- 2015: Bragantino
- 2019: Fluminense (assistant)
- 2019–2021: São Paulo (assistant)
- 2021: Santos (assistant)
- 2024–: São Paulo (youth)
- * Club domestic league appearances and goals

Márcio Longo de Araújo (born 7 May 1960) is a Brazilian professional football coach and former player who played as either a central defender or a defensive midfielder.

== Playing career ==
Born in São José do Rio Pardo, São Paulo, Márcio Araújo was a São Paulo youth graduate. Despite making his first team debut in 1978, he only started to feature more regularly in 1983, after a loan to São Bento.

Ahead of the 1987 season, Márcio Araújo left the Tricolor and signed for Noroeste, but moved to Portuguesa in the following year. In 1991, he signed for Coritiba, and after five league matches, he retired.

== Coaching career ==
Shortly after retiring, Márcio Araújo began his coaching career at Ponte Preta's Aspirantes (under-23) team. He then returned to São Paulo to manage their under-20 squad, and won the 1993 Copa São Paulo de Futebol Júnior, having Rogério Ceni as his first-choice goalkeeper; in that year, he was also head coach of the main squad on some occasions, as the club opted to rest the first team.

In August 1993, Márcio Araújo was head coach of Corinthians for one match, before the arrival of Mário Sérgio. In 1995, he was named assistant coach at Palmeiras, but was appointed head coach in January 1997 after Vanderlei Luxemburgo moved to Santos.

Márcio Araújo was fired by Verdão on 27 May 1997, after two consecutive defeats to rivals Corinthians and São Paulo. On 1 December, he took over Inter de Limeira for the ensuing Campeonato Paulista, and subsequently moved to Paraná, helping the latter to narrowly avoid relegation.

Márcio Araújo left Paraná in the end of the 1998 campaign, but was appointed head coach of the club again in February 1999. He left the club in July, and replaced Abel Braga at the helm of Coritiba in September.

After leaving Coritiba on 9 December 1999, Márcio Araújo was appointed head coach of Atlético Mineiro the following 12 February. He resigned in July, and subsequently worked at Rio Claro before returning to Palmeiras as a technical coordinator.

In March 2001, Márcio Araújo was named interim head coach of Verdão, after Marco Aurélio resigned. He returned to his previous role after the appointment of Celso Roth, but was again appointed head coach in October after Roth was fired.

Márcio Araújo returned to Rio Claro for the 2002 season, and was in charge of Guaratinguetá before being presented at Fortaleza on 19 August 2003. He was relieved of his duties on 19 December, and spent the 2004 campaign as Marco Aurélio's assistant at Cruzeiro.

Márcio Araújo returned to coaching duties on 25 June 2005, after being named head coach of Avaí. Dismissed on 3 October, he returned to Coritiba late in the month, but was sacked from the latter on 24 February 2006.

On 2 February 2007, Márcio Araújo returned to Rio Claro for a third spell, but left the club to return to Guaratinguetá on 13 March. He won the Campeonato do Interior with the latter side in the 2007 Campeonato Paulista, before being named in charge of Goiás on 20 September.

Dismissed by Goiás on 30 November 2007, Márcio Araújo replaced Gelson Silva at the helm of Grêmio Barueri on 19 February 2008. He opted to leave the club in April, but returned to the club in August. After achieving a first-ever promotion in the 2008 Série B, he left the club again after failing to agree new terms.

Márcio Araújo returned to Guará on 1 March 2009, but suffered relegation in the year's Paulistão. He took over Figueirense on 29 August, and left on 1 December after failing to achieve promotion.

On 22 December 2009, Márcio Araújo was appointed head coach of Sertãozinho for the 2010 Campeonato Paulista, but resigned the following 4 February, after only six matches. On 11 August 2010, he was named at the helm of Bahia, and helped in their return to the top tier after a seven-year absence. Shortly after achieving promotion, he left the club after rejecting a contract renewal.

On 12 September 2011, Márcio Araújo replaced Vadão as head coach of São Caetano. The following 25 May, he was dismissed by the club.

On 23 February 2015, after nearly three years without a club, Márcio Araújo took over Bragantino, but was replaced by Vágner Benazzi on 20 March. In 2019, he became Fernando Diniz's assistant at Fluminense, and also worked with Diniz at São Paulo and Santos. On 6 July 2021, he left the latter club after alleging "personal reasons".

After a few years away from football, Araújo was a announced as new coordinator of the São Paulo youth sector in May 2024.

== Career statistics ==
Club	Season	League			State League		Cup		Continental		Other		Total	
Club	Season	Division	Apps	Goals	Apps	Goals	Apps	Goals	Apps	Goals	Apps	Goals	Apps	Goals
São Paulo	1978	Série A	0	0	1	0	—		—		—		1	0
São Paulo	1981	Série A	0	0	4	0	—		—		—		4	0
São Paulo	1982	Série A	0	0	0	0	—		—		—		0	0
São Paulo	1983	Série A	6	0	24	1	—		—		—		24	1
São Paulo	1984	Série A	12	1	35	1	—		—		9 (Note: Appearance(s) in Torneio Heleno Nunes)	0	56	2
São Paulo	1985	Série A	15	1	40	2	—		—		—		55	3
São Paulo	1986	Série A	7	0	27	0	—		—		2 (Note: Appearance(s) in Torneio Rio – São Paulo)	0	36	0
São Paulo	Total		40	2	131	4	0	0	—		11	0	182	4
Coritiba	1991	Série B	5	0	—		1	0	—		—		6	0
Career total			45	2	131	4	1	0	0	0	11	0	188	4

== Coaching statistics ==
As of 29 May 2021

Coaching record by team and tenure
Team	Nat	From	To	Record								Ref
Team	Nat	From	To	G	W	D	L	GF	GA	GD	Win %	Ref
São Paulo (interim)	(Brazil)	April 1993	June 1993	6	2	2	2	11	10	+1	33.33	
Corinthians (interim)	(Brazil)	August 1993	August 1993	1	0	0	1	0	1	−1	0.00	
Palmeiras	(Brazil)	January 1997	27 May 1997	36	21	8	7	87	45	+42	58.33	
Inter de Limeira	(Brazil)	1 December 1997	February 1998	5	0	4	1	5	6	−1	0.00	
Paraná	(Brazil)	September 1998	December 1998	7	2	1	4	7	12	−5	28.57	
Paraná	(Brazil)	26 February 1999	July 1999	29	17	7	5	54	25	+29	58.62	
Coritiba	(Brazil)	September 1999	9 December 1999	14	7	4	3	27	19	+8	50.00	
Atlético Mineiro	(Brazil)	12 February 2000	July 2000	32	15	9	8	57	45	+12	46.88	
Palmeiras (interim)	(Brazil)	2 March 2001	4 March 2001	1	0	1	0	0	0	+0	0.00	
Palmeiras	(Brazil)	29 October 2001	3 December 2001	7	1	0	6	7	20	−13	14.29	
Rio Claro	(Brazil)	April 2002	December 2002	34	20	8	6	68	33	+35	58.82	
Guaratinguetá	(Brazil)	January 2003	March 2003	14	7	2	5	25	20	+5	50.00	
Fortaleza	(Brazil)	19 August 2003	19 December 2003	20	5	8	7	27	31	−4	25.00	
Avaí	(Brazil)	25 June 2005	3 October 2005	14	6	2	6	19	18	+1	42.86	
Coritiba	(Brazil)	28 October 2005	24 February 2006	20	8	6	6	24	19	+5	40.00	
Rio Claro	(Brazil)	2 February 2007	13 March 2007	8	1	4	3	6	12	−6	12.50	
Guaratinguetá	(Brazil)	13 March 2007	May 2007	10	5	3	2	18	12	+6	50.00	
Goiás	(Brazil)	20 September 2007	30 November 2007	12	2	4	6	15	23	−8	16.67	
Grêmio Barueri	(Brazil)	19 February 2008	7 April 2008	10	6	0	4	20	13	+7	60.00	
Grêmio Barueri	(Brazil)	14 August 2008	3 December 2008	20	12	0	8	31	23	+8	60.00	
Guaratinguetá	(Brazil)	1 March 2009	8 April 2009	8	1	2	5	12	16	−4	12.50	
Figueirense	(Brazil)	29 August 2009	1 December 2009	17	9	0	8	32	24	+8	52.94	
Sertãozinho	(Brazil)	22 December 2009	4 February 2010	6	0	4	2	5	11	−6	0.00	
Bahia	(Brazil)	11 August 2010	2 December 2010	25	12	6	7	41	27	+14	48.00	
São Caetano	(Brazil)	12 September 2011	25 May 2012	35	12	14	9	52	40	+12	34.29	
Bragantino	(Brazil)	23 February 2015	20 March 2015	5	1	0	4	3	6	−3	20.00	
Fluminense (interim)	(Brazil)	2 June 2019	2 June 2019	1	0	0	1	0	3	−3	0.00	
São Paulo (interim)	(Brazil)	4 December 2019	4 December 2019	1	1	0	0	2	1	+1	100.00	
São Paulo (interim)	(Brazil)	5 March 2020	5 March 2020	1	0	0	1	1	2	−1	0.00	
Santos (interim)	(Brazil)	18 May 2021	18 May 2021	1	0	0	1	1	2	−1	0.00	
Santos (interim)	(Brazil)	26 May 2021	26 May 2021	1	0	0	1	1	3	−2	0.00	
Total				401	173	99	129	658	522	+136	43.14	—

== Honours ==
=== Player ===
São Paulo

- Campeonato Paulista: 1981, 1985
- Campeonato Brasileiro Série A: 1986

=== Coach ===
São Paulo U20

- Copa São Paulo de Futebol Júnior: 1993

Atlético Mineiro

- Campeonato Mineiro: 2000
