= Gassem Youssef =

Brazilian footballer

Gassem
Personal information
- Full name: Gassem Salim Youssef
- Date of birth: 18 March 1958 (age 68)
- Place of birth: Pontal do Paraná, Brazil
- Position: Centre-back

Youth career
- Paissandú-PR

Senior career*
| Years | Team | Apps | (Gls) |
| 1976–1979 | Colorado-PR | | |
| 1980–1984 | São Paulo | 201 | (2) |
| 1984–1985 | Colorado-PR | | |
| 1985–1986 | Sport Recife | | |
| 1987 | Novorizontino | | |
| 1988 | Pinheiros-PR | | |
| 1988 | Blumenau | | |
| 1989 | Central Brasileira | | |
| 1990 | Guarany de Cruz Alta | | |
| 1990–1991 | Central Brasileira | | |
| 1992 | Guarany de Cruz Alta | | |
| 1992–1993 | Blumenau | | |

Managerial career
- 1995–1996: Blumenau
- 1997: Juventus-SC
- 1997: Brusque
- 1998: Figueirense
- 1998–1999: Brusque
- 2000: Guarany de Cruz Alta
- 2000–2001: Rio Branco-PR
- 2001: Brusque
- 2003: Metropolitano
- 2003: Operário Ferroviário
- 2004: Rio Branco-PR
- 2013: Rio Branco-PR
- * Club domestic league appearances and goals as of 21 September 2023

Gassem Salim Youssef (born 18 March 1958), simply known as Gassem, is a Brazilian former professional footballer and manager who played as a centre-back.

== Playing career ==
Gassem began his life in sport playing basketball at Paissandú in Curitiba. At the suggestion of his teachers, he tried his luck in football, where he began to fall in love with his game. Soon he went to Colorado EC, at the time coached by Armando Renganeschi. On recommendation from the coach, he was hired by São Paulo, where he played alongside Oscar Bernardi and Dario Pereyra.

== Managerial career ==
Started his career as coach of Blumenau EC, the last team he played for. In 1997 at Brusque he was champion of the second division of Santa Catarina, being hired by Figueirense the following year. He also accumulated passages through the Rio Branco de Paranaguá.

== Personal life ==
Permanently retired from football, today Gassem owns a restaurant.

== Honours ==
=== Player ===
São Paulo

- Campeonato Paulista: 1980, 1981

=== Manager ===
Brusque

- Campeonato Catarinense Série B: 1997
