= 1980 in Brazilian football =

Football in Brazil
- Season: 1980

The following article presents a summary of the 1980 football (soccer) season in Brazil, which was the 79th season of competitive football in the country.

== Campeonato Brasileiro Série A ==
Semifinals

Team 1	Agg.	Team 2	1st leg	2nd leg
Atlético Mineiro	4-1	Internacional	1-1	3-0
Coritiba	3-6	Flamengo	0-2	3-4

Final

May 28, 1980

Atlético Mineiro	1–0	Flamengo

Mineirão

June 1, 1980

Flamengo	3–2	Atlético Mineiro

Maracanã

Flamengo declared as the Campeonato Brasileiro champions by aggregate score of 3-3.

== Campeonato Brasileiro Série B ==
Semifinals

Team 1	Agg.	Team 2	1st leg	2nd leg
Botafogo-SP	1-3	Londrina	1-2	0-1
CSA	2-0	Ferroviária	1-0	1-0

Final

May 11, 1980

CSA	1–1	Londrina

May 18, 1980

Londrina	4–0	CSA

Londrina declared as the Campeonato Brasileiro Série B champions by aggregate score of 5–1.

=== Promotion ===
The champion and the runner-up, which are Londrina and CSA, were promoted to the following year's first level.

== State championship champions ==
State	Champion	State	Champion
Acre	Juventus-AC	Paraíba	Campinense
Alagoas	CSA	Paraná	Cascavel; Colorado^{(1)}
Amapá	Macapá	Pernambuco	Sport Recife
Amazonas	Nacional	Piauí	River
Bahia	Vitória	Rio de Janeiro	Fluminense
Ceará	Ceará	Rio Grande do Norte	América-RN
Distrito Federal	Brasília	Rio Grande do Sul	Grêmio
Espírito Santo	Desporiva	Rondônia	Moto Clube
Goiás	Vila Nova	Roraima	Atlético Roraima
Maranhão	Sampaio Corrêa	Santa Catarina	Joinville
Mato Grosso	Mixto	São Paulo	São Paulo
Mato Grosso do Sul	Operário	Sergipe	Itabaiana
Minas Gerais	Atlético Mineiro	Tocantins	-
Pará	Paysandu		

^{(1)}Cascavel and Colorado shared the Paraná State Championship title.

== Youth competition champions ==
Competition	Champion
Copa São Paulo de Juniores	Internacional

== Other competition champions ==
Competition	Champion
Taça Minas Gerais	Uberaba
Torneio de Integração da Amazônia	Ferroviário

== Brazilian clubs in international competitions ==
Team	Copa Libertadores 1980
Internacional	Runner-up
Vasco	Group stage

== Brazil national team ==
The following table lists all the games played by the Brazil national football team in official competitions and friendly matches during 1980.

Date	Opposition	Result	Score	Brazil scorers	Competition
April 2, 1980	Brazil Youth Team	W	7-1	Falcão, Reinaldo (2), Zico (2), Joãozinho, Baltazar	International Friendly (unofficial match)
May 1, 1980	Minas Gerais State Combined Team	W	4-0	Serginho Chulapa, Renato (2), Sócrates	International Friendly (unofficial match)
June 8, 1980	Mexico	W	2-0	Zé Sérgio, Serginho Chulapa	International Friendly
June 15, 1980	Soviet Union	L	1-2	Nunes	International Friendly
June 24, 1980	Chile	W	2-1	Zico, Toninho Cerezo	International Friendly
June 29, 1980	Poland	D	1-1	Zico	International Friendly
August 27, 1980	Uruguay	W	1-0	Getúlio	International Friendly
September 25, 1980	Paraguay	W	2-1	Reinaldo, Zé Sérgio	International Friendly
October 30, 1980	Paraguay	W	6-0	Zé Sérgio, Tita, Zico (2), Sócrates, Luizinho	International Friendly
December 21, 1980	Switzerland	W	2-0	Sócrates, Zé Sérgio	International Friendly
