= Chiquito River =

Chiquito River may refer to:

- Chiquito River (Guayama, Puerto Rico)
- Chiquito River (Ponce, Puerto Rico)
- Chiquito River (Yauco, Puerto Rico)

== See also ==
- Chiquito (disambiguation)
