= Heriberto da Cunha =

Brazilian footballer (born 1960)

Heriberto
Personal information
- Full name: Heriberto Longuinho da Cunha
- Date of birth: 7 April 1960 (age 66)
- Place of birth: Santa Rita do Sapucaí, Brazil
- Position: Midfielder

Youth career
- –1977: São Paulo

Senior career*
Years	Team	Apps	(Gls)
1977–1983	São Paulo	198	(8)
1983–1984	Portuguesa		
1984–1985	America-RJ		
1985	→ Juventus-SP (loan)		
1986–1989	Cruzeiro	133	(15)
1988	→ Santos (loan)		
1990	Atlético Paranaense		
1990–1991	Sumitomo		
1992	Atlético Paranaense		
1992	Mogi Mirim		
1993	São Caetano		

Managerial career
- 1996–1998: São Paulo (assistant)
- 1999: Atlético Mineiro (assistant)
- 2000: Guarani (assistant)
- 2001: Inter de Limeira
- 2001: Corinthians (assistant)
- 2001–2002: CSA
- 2002: Sport Recife
- 2002–2003: Atlético Paranaense
- 2003: Náutico
- 2003: Portuguesa
- 2004–2005: Sport Recife
- 2005–2006: Gama
- 2006: América-RN
- 2006–2007: Figueirense
- 2007: América-SP
- 2007–2008: Ceará
- 2008: Fortaleza
- 2008: Grêmio Barueri
- 2008–2009: Fortaleza
- 2009: ABC
- 2009: Brasiliense
- 2009–2010: Anapolina
- 2010: Itumbiara
- 2010–2011: Gama
- 2012: ASA
- 2013: CRB
- 2013–2014: Vila Nova
- 2016: Nacional-AM
- 2023: Pouso Alegre
- * Club domestic league appearances and goals

Heriberto Longuinho da Cunha (born 7 April 1960), also known as Heriberto da Cunha or Heriberto, is a Brazilian former professional football player and manager who played as a midfielder.

== Playing career ==
Revealed in São Paulo FC youth sectors, Heriberto was promoted to the professional team in November 1977, and remained at the club until 1983, being part of the state conquests in 1980 and 1981, and making a total of 198 appearances with 8 goals. Central midfielder with great skill, he also made a mark at Cruzeiro EC, where he was Minas Gerais champion in 1987 and made 133 appearances with 15 goals. He also played for Santos, Athletico Paranaense, Sumitomo (currently Kashima Antlers), and ended his career at AD São Caetano in 1993.

== Managerial career ==
Like in his playing career, he began his managerial career in São Paulo FC youth sectors. With the arrival of Darío Pereyra as head coach, a teammate from the club in the past, he became an assistant in professional team. And with Darío he worked at other clubs such as Atlético Mineiro, Guarani and Corinthians. As a head coach, he began his career in 2001 at Inter de Limeira. Heriberto da Cunha accumulated spells at several clubs in Brazil, with emphasis on América de Natal where he gained the promotion to Série A in 2006, and at Fortaleza where he was champion of Ceará state league in 2008.

His last works as manager were at Vila Nova in 2014 and Nacional de Manaus in 2016, when he retired from his management career for the first time.

After retiring became vice-president of Pouso Alegre FC, a club that returned to professional football in 2018, but due to his experience, became the club's caretaker on some occasions, especially in 2023.

== Personal life ==
In 2009, Heriberto was arrested after offending police officers during the ABC vs. Fast Clube match, valid for the 2009 Copa do Brasil. After recording the incident, he was released.

== Honours ==
=== Player ===
São Paulo

- Campeonato Paulista: 1980, 1981

Cruzeiro

- Campeonato Mineiro: 1987

Athletico Paranaense

- Campeonato Paranaense: 1990

=== Manager ===
Fortaleza

- Campeonato Cearense: 2008
