= Marcão (footballer, born 1954) =

Brazilian footballer

Personal information
- Full name: Marco Benedito Marcelo
- Date of birth: 10 May 1954
- Place of birth: Americana, Brazil
- Date of death: 14 June 2019 (aged 65)
- Place of death: Araraquara, Brazil
- Height: 2.00 m (6 ft 7 in)
- Position: Forward

Senior career*
Years	Team	Apps	(Gls)
1972–1973	Ponte Preta		
1973	Figueirense		
1974	Esportiva-MG		
1975–1977	América-MG		
1977	CRB		
1978–1979	XV de Jaú		
1980	Noroeste		
1981	Vitória		
1981–1982	Inter de Limeira		
1982–1983	Ferroviária		
1983–1984	São Paulo	40	(11)
1984	America-RJ		
1985	Araçatuba		
1986–1988	Ferroviária		
1989	Esportiva-MG		
1991	União Suzano		
1992	Ferroviária		
1992	São Caetano		
- * Club domestic league appearances and goals as of 13 April 2024

Marco Benedito Marcelo (10 May 1954 – 14 June 2019), better known as Marcão, was a Brazilian professional footballer who played as a forward.

== Career ==
A striker who attracted attention due to his height, he began his career with Ponte Preta in 1972. He played for several Brazilian football teams, most notably América Mineiro, when he became de top scorer of 1976 Campeonato Mineiro, and Ferroviária, a team for which he scored 59 goals during his various spells. He played for São Paulo in 1983 and 1984, scoring 11 goals in 40 appearances. He played at the end of his career for teams in the lower divisions of São Paulo, such as União Suzano and AD São Caetano.

== Honours ==
Individual

- 1976 Campeonato Mineiro top scorer: 13 goals

== Death ==
Marcão died on 14 June 2019, in Araraquara, victim of a heart attack.
