= Chiquito (footballer) =

Brazilian footballer

Personal information
- Full name: Francisco Vieira da Silva
- Date of birth: 6 December 1954 (age 71)
- Place of birth: Congonhas do Norte, Brazil
- Position: Right back

Youth career
- –1974: Atlético Mineiro

Senior career*
Years	Team	Apps	(Gls)
1974–1977	Atlético Mineiro	27	(1)
1977	CRB		
1978	Atlético Goianiense		
1979	Goiás		
1980	Atlético Goianiense		
1981	Santa Cruz		
1981	São Paulo	33	(1)
1982	Ferroviário		
1982	Cruzeiro	22	(0)
1983	Colorado-PR		
1983–1984	Grêmio Maringá		
1985	America-RJ		
1986	Brasil de Pelotas		
1986	São Paulo-RS		
1987	Marcílio Dias		
- * Club domestic league appearances and goals as of 19 October 2023

Francisco Vieira da Silva (born 6 December 1954), better known as Chiquito, is a Brazilian former professional footballer who played as a right back.

== Career ==
Formed in the youth categories of Atlético Mineiro, he played for several clubs in Brazil, notably São Paulo and Cruzeiro.

== Honours ==
Atlético Mineiro

- Campeonato Mineiro: 1976
- Taça Minas Gerais: 1976

São Paulo

- Campeonato Paulista: 1981
