= Monte Sião =

- Municipality
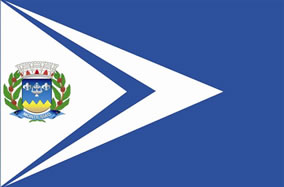
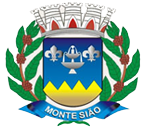
- Flag Coat of arms

- Location in Brazil
- Coordinates: 22°25′58″S 46°34′22″W
- Country: Brazil
- Region: Southeast
- State: Minas Gerais
- Mesoregion: Sul de Minas

Population (2020)
  - Total: 24,029
- Time zone: UTC−3 (BRT)

Monte Sião is a municipality in the state of Minas Gerais in the Southeast region of Brazil.

== See also ==
- List of municipalities in Minas Gerais
