= Congonhas do Norte =

- Municipality
- Location within Minas Gerais

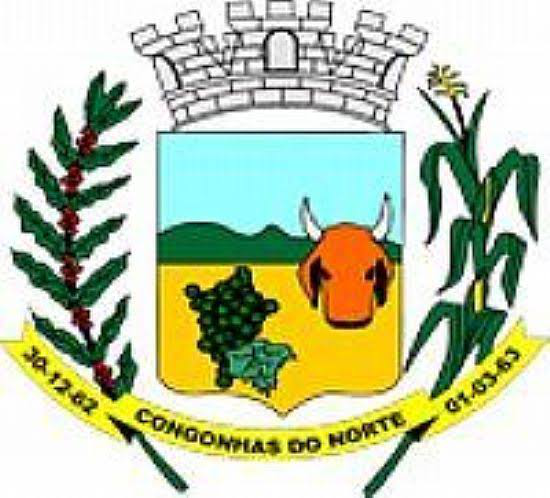
- Flag Coat of arms
- Interactive map of Congonhas do Norte
- Coordinates: 18.806944°S 43.680833°W
- Country: Brazil
- State: Minas Gerais
- Mesoregion: Metropolitana de Belo Horizonte
- Microregion: Conceição do Mato Dentro

Population (2022 Census)
  - Total: 4,831
  - Estimate (2025): 4,924
- Time zone: UTC−3 (BRT)

Congonhas do Norte is a Brazilian municipality located in the state of Minas Gerais. The city belongs to the mesoregion Metropolitana de Belo Horizonte and to the microregion of Conceição do Mato Dentro.

== See also ==
- List of municipalities in Minas Gerais
