= Zé Sérgio =

Brazilian footballer

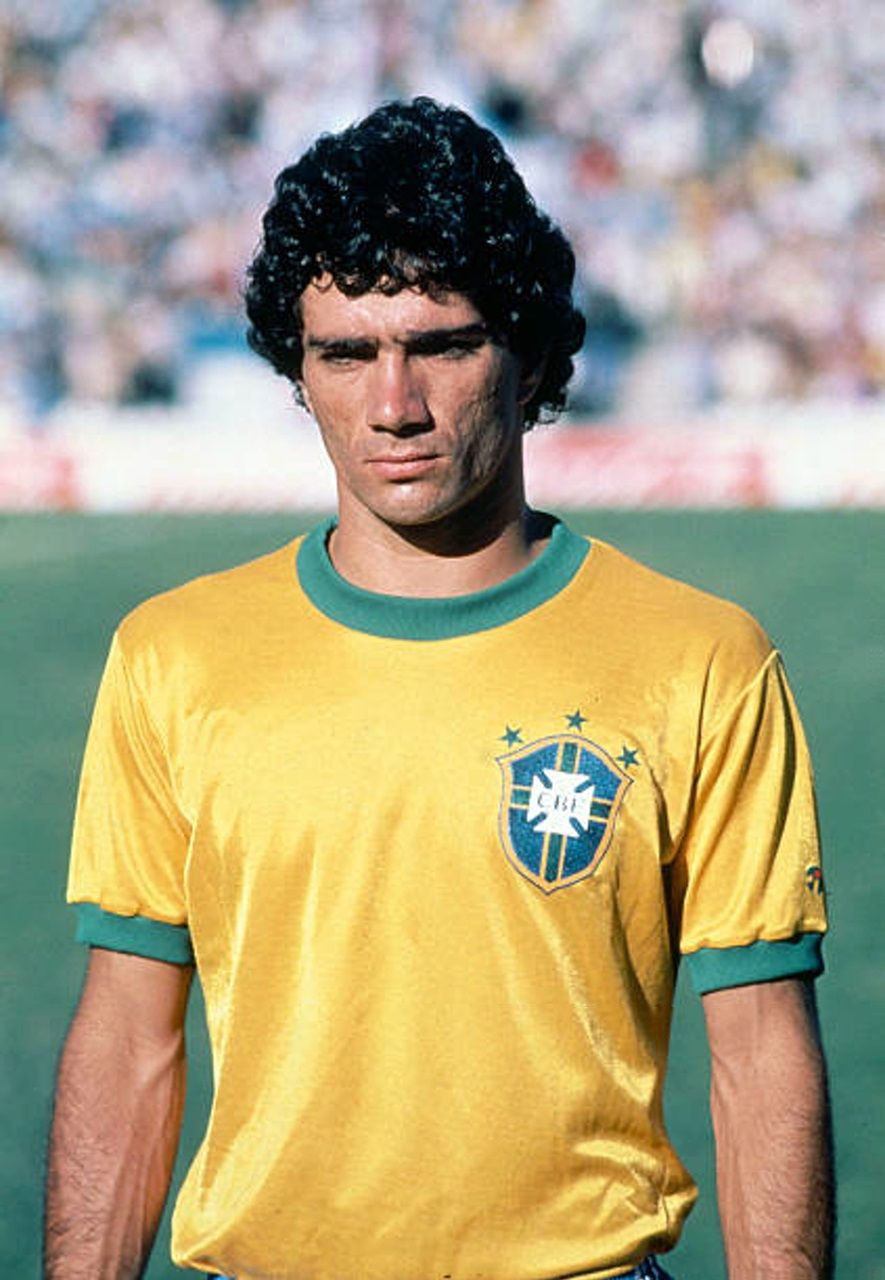

Personal information
- Full name: José Sérgio Presti
- Date of birth: March 8, 1957 (age 69)
- Place of birth: São Paulo, Brazil
- Height: 1.73 m (5 ft 8 in)
- Position: Striker

Senior career*
Years	Team	Apps	(Gls)
1976–1984	São Paulo	353	(48)
1984–1986	Santos	135	(15)
1986–1987	Vasco da Gama		
1988–1991	Hitachi		

International career
1978–1981	Brazil	25	(5)

Managerial career
- 1993–1995: Kashiwa Reysol
- 2005–2011: São Paulo (U17)
- 2012: São Paulo (U20)
- 2012: Ponte Preta (U20)
- 2012: Ponte Preta (interim)
- 2013: Ponte Preta (interim)
- * Club domestic league appearances and goals

José Sérgio Presti (born March 8, 1957, in São Paulo), mainly known as Zé Sérgio, is a Brazilian former football player who played as a striker.

Zé Sérgio was brought to São Paulo's youth academy by his cousin, Rivellino. He won the Campeonato Paulista with Santos in 1984 before going on to play for Vasco da Gama and Japanese club Hitachi, where he retired. He has been described as one of the most talented dribblers in Brazil during the 70s and 80s.

== Career ==
=== São Paulo ===
On 13 June 1976, Zé Sérgio made his debut for São Paulo.

In 1980, he was involved in an alleged doping case, where he stated he had taken flu medicine prescribed by the team doctor. He was described as "fundamental" to winning the 1980 Campeonato Paulista.

During his playing days, he suffered from recurring injuries. He broke his arm in Mexico, and after recovering in Brazil, fractured his arm, before twisting his knee in recovery. He had two knee surgeries before the 1982 FIFA World Cup, but was unable to make the tournament.

He scored his last goal for the club against Guarani on 20 May 1984.

=== Santos ===
In 1984, Zé Sérgio and Humberto Suzigan were swapped to Santos, whilst Pita moved to São Paulo.

In 1985, Santos participated in the Kirin Cup, scoring against West Ham, the Japan national football team and the Uruguay national football team.

=== Hitachi ===
In 1988, he joined Hitachi, where he trained "on a baseball pitch" as the "J-league didn't even exist yet."

== Coaching career ==
Zé Sérgio has set up two soccer schools in Vinhedo and Campinas, which aims to accommodate boys from Japan and Europe.

In 2012, Zé Sérgio was appointed coach of São Paulo's U20 team.

After being fired by São Paulo, he took over as manager of Ponte Preta's U20 team. He was also named as interim coach of Ponte Preta in 2012.

== International career ==
Zé Sérgio was selected in the squads for the 1978 FIFA World Cup and the 1979 Copa América.

== Personal life ==
Zé Sérgio's daughter is Thaissa Presti, who is a sprinter.

== Managerial statistics ==
Team	From	To	Record				
Team	From	To	G	W	D	L	Win %
Kashiwa Reysol	1995	1995	26	7	0	19	26.92
Total			26	7	0	19	26.92

== Honours ==
São Paulo

- Campeonato Brasileiro Série A: 1977
- Campeonato Paulista: 1980, 1981

Santos

- Campeonato Paulista: 1984

Vasco da Gama

- Campeonato Carioca: 1987
