= Humberto Suzigan =

Brazilian footballer

Humberto
Personal information
- Full name: Carlos Humberto Suzigan
- Date of birth: 3 August 1956 (age 70)
- Place of birth: Mogi Guaçu, Brazil
- Position: Midfielder

Youth career
- Ponte Preta

Senior career*
Years	Team	Apps	(Gls)
1974–1981	Ponte Preta		
1976	→ Operário-MS (loan)		
1976	→ Independente-SP (loan)		
1982–1983	Portuguesa		
1983–1984	São Paulo	58	(4)
1984–1985	Santos	96	(11)
1986	Paulista		
1986	Bahia		
1987	Vasco da Gama		
1987–1988	Santo André		
1988	União São João		
1989–1991	Mogi Mirim		
1992	Guaçuano		
- * Club domestic league appearances and goals as of 10 October 2023

Carlos Humberto Suzigan (born 3 August 1968), simply known as Humberto, is a Brazilian former professional footballer who played as a midfielder.

== Career ==
Humberto started at Ponte Preta when he was 14 years old. Four years later, the ball already proved to be the best option and effectively began a career that would include spells at some of the biggest clubs in the country (Ponte Preta, Santos, São Paulo, Portuguesa, Vasco and Bahia) and others with lower investment, such as Operário, Mogi Mirim, União São João, Independente de Limeira, Paulista de Jundiaí, Santo André and Guaçuano, where he retired in 1992.

== Honours ==
Santos

- Campeonato Paulista: 1984
