= Zé Mário (footballer, born 1954) =

Brazilian footballer

Personal information
- Full name: José Mário Crispim
- Date of birth: 16 May 1954 (age 72)
- Place of birth: Sales Oliveira, Brazil
- Position: Midfielder

Youth career
- Botafogo-SP

Senior career*
Years	Team	Apps	(Gls)
1974	Noroeste		
1975–1980	Palmeiras	120	(20)
1976–1977	→ Botafogo-SP (loan)		
1977	→ Santos (loan)		
1980–1982	Ponte Preta		
1982	Francana		
1983	Uberlândia		
1983–1984	São Paulo	94	(4)
1985	Juventus-SP		
1986	Remo		
1987	Ponte Preta		

International career
1974	Brazil U20		

Managerial career
- 1996: Botafogo-SP
- 1997: Botafogo-SP
- 2001: Botafogo-SP
- 2004: Botafogo-SP
- 2012: Botafogo-SP (Director of Football)
- * Club domestic league appearances and goals

José Mário Crispim (born 16 May 1954), simply known as Zé Mário is a Brazilian former professional football player and manager who played as a midfielder.

== Playing career ==
Appointed as the ideal replacement for Ademir da Guia, Zé Mário was hired by Palmeiras with great expectations. However, without finding space at the club at first, he was negotiated with Botafogo-SP and Santos to gain experience. He returned to Palmeiras in the late 70s where he was state champion. In 1981 at Ponte Preta, he had his great year, being nominated for the Bola de Prata.

For the Brazil under-20 team, he was South American champion in 1974.

== Managerial career ==
After helping with the preparations of the youth categories, he was coach of Botafogo-SP in 1996, in the runner-up campaign of Campeonato Brasileiro Série C. Zé Mário had two more spells at Botafogo, in 2001 and 2004. In 2012 he was the club's football director.

== Honours ==
Brazil U20

- South American U-20 Championship: 1974

Palmeiras

- Campeonato Paulista: 1976
