= 1980 Campeonato Paulista =

Campeonato Paulista – Série A1
- Season: 1980
- Champions: São Paulo
- Relegated: XV de Piracicaba
- Taça de Ouro: São Paulo; Santos; Ponte Preta; Corinthians; Portuguesa; Inter de Limeira
- Taça de Prata: Guarani; Botafogo; Juventus; São Bento; Comercial; Ferroviária; América; Palmeiras
- Matches played: 394
- Goals scored: 876 (2.22 per match)
- Top goalscorer: Edmar (Taubaté) – 17 goals
- Biggest home win: Ferroviária 6-0 Noroeste (June 8, 1980); Botafogo 6-0 América (October 26, 1980)
- Biggest away win: Inter de Limeira 1-5 Ponte Preta (June 8, 1980)
- Highest scoring: Guarani 6-3 XV de Jaú (July 13, 1980)

The 1980 Campeonato Paulista da Primeira Divisão de Futebol Profissional was the 79th season of São Paulo's top professional football league. São Paulo won the championship for the 12th time. (Taubaté's Edmar was the top scorer, with 17 goals. XV de Piracicaba was relegated.

== Championship ==
The championship would be divided into two rounds - in each round, the teams played against each other once, and the four best teams qualified to the Semifinals, with their winners qualifying to the Finals. The winners of each round qualified to the Championship Finals.

=== First round ===
Pos	Team	Pld	W	D	L	GF	GA	GD	Pts	Qualification or relegation
1	Portuguesa	19	12	5	2	31	17	+14	29	Qualified
2	Santos	19	10	7	2	29	13	+16	27	Qualified
3	Botafogo	19	9	5	5	27	16	+11	23	Qualified
4	Ponte Preta	19	8	7	4	30	20	+10	23	Qualified
5	Corinthians	19	7	8	4	18	12	+6	22	
6	Taubaté	19	7	7	5	20	23	−3	21	
7	Palmeiras	19	7	6	6	22	19	+3	20	
8	São Paulo	19	7	6	6	21	18	+3	20	
9	São Bento	19	7	6	6	19	19	0	20	
10	Comercial	19	7	5	7	22	25	−3	19	
11	Guarani	19	6	7	6	28	23	+5	19	
12	Inter de Limeira	19	5	9	5	26	24	+2	19	
13	América	19	5	8	6	20	17	+3	18	
14	Juventus	19	6	5	8	17	23	−6	17	
15	Ferroviária	19	4	8	7	21	23	−2	16	
16	XV de Jaú	19	4	7	8	20	29	−9	15	
17	Marília	19	6	2	11	15	29	−14	14	
18	XV de Piracicaba	19	5	3	11	16	26	−10	13	
19	Francana	19	3	7	9	18	27	−9	13	
20	Noroeste	19	4	4	11	14	31	−17	12	

Updated to match(es) played on July 25, 1980. Source: RSSSF.com
Rules for classification: 1) points; 2) wins; 3) goal difference; 4) number of goals scored.

==== First round Semifinals ====
Team 1	Agg.	Team 2	1st leg	2nd leg
Portuguesa	2–0	Ponte Preta	0–0	2–0
Santos	7–1	Botafogo	5–1	2–0

==== First round Finals ====
Team 1	Agg.	Team 2	1st leg	2nd leg
Santos	3–1	Portuguesa	1–0	2–1

=== Second round ===
Pos	Team	Pld	W	D	L	GF	GA	GD	Pts	Qualification or relegation
1	São Paulo	19	11	7	1	26	9	+17	29	Qualified
2	Ponte Preta	19	9	9	1	27	12	+15	27	Qualified
3	Corinthians	19	11	4	4	30	18	+12	26	Qualified
4	Inter de Limeira	19	9	8	2	30	17	+13	26	Qualified
5	Guarani	19	10	5	4	29	19	+10	25	
6	Juventus	19	8	6	5	22	20	+2	22	
7	Santos	19	6	9	4	19	19	0	21	
8	Botafogo	19	7	5	7	28	17	+11	19	
9	Ferroviária	19	6	6	7	24	22	+2	18	
10	XV de Jaú	19	6	6	7	21	25	−4	18	
11	Comercial	19	5	8	6	19	21	−2	18	
12	Portuguesa	19	6	5	8	17	26	−9	17	
13	Noroeste	19	5	7	7	16	15	+1	17	
14	Francana	19	3	10	6	11	15	−4	16	
15	São Bento	19	4	7	8	13	18	−5	15	
16	América	19	4	7	8	20	28	−8	15	
17	Marília	19	3	9	7	16	26	−10	15	
18	Taubaté	19	4	6	9	16	28	−12	14	
19	Palmeiras	19	2	8	9	14	26	−12	12	
20	XV de Piracicaba	19	2	6	11	12	29	−17	10	

Updated to match(es) played on October 26, 1980. Source: RSSSF.com
Rules for classification: 1) points; 2) wins; 3) goal difference; 4) number of goals scored.

==== Second round Semifinals ====
Team 1	Agg.	Team 2	1st leg	2nd leg
São Paulo	4–3	Inter de Limeira	1–2	3–1 (a.e.t)
Corinthians	1–4	Ponte Preta	1–1	0–3

==== Second round Finals ====
Team 1	Agg.	Team 2	1st leg	2nd leg
São Paulo	2–2	Ponte Preta	2–1	0–1

=== Finals ===
Team 1	Agg.	Team 2	1st leg	2nd leg
São Paulo	2–0	Santos	1–0	1–0

=== Aggregate table ===
Pos	Team	Pld	W	D	L	GF	GA	GD	Pts	Qualification or relegation
1	Ponte Preta	38	17	16	5	57	32	+25	50	1981 Taça de Ouro
2	São Paulo	38	18	13	7	47	27	+20	49	1981 Taça de Ouro
3	Corinthians	38	18	12	8	48	30	+18	48	1981 Taça de Ouro
4	Santos	38	16	16	6	48	32	+16	48	1981 Taça de Ouro
5	Portuguesa	38	18	10	10	48	43	+5	46	1981 Taça de Ouro
6	Inter de Limeira	38	14	17	7	56	41	+15	45	1981 Taça de Ouro
7	Guarani	38	16	12	10	57	42	+15	44	1981 Taça de Prata
8	Botafogo	38	16	10	12	55	33	+22	42	1981 Taça de Prata
9	Juventus	38	13	11	14	38	44	−6	37	1981 Taça de Prata
10	São Bento	38	12	13	13	33	36	−3	37	1981 Taça de Prata
11	Comercial	38	12	13	13	41	46	−5	37	1981 Taça de Prata
12	Taubaté	38	11	13	14	36	51	−15	35	
13	Ferroviária	38	10	14	14	45	45	0	34	1981 Taça de Prata
14	XV de Jaú	38	10	13	15	41	54	−13	33	
15	América	38	9	15	14	40	45	−5	33	1981 Taça de Prata
16	Palmeiras	38	9	14	15	36	45	−9	32	1981 Taça de Prata
17	Noroeste	38	9	11	18	30	46	−16	29	
18	Marília	38	9	11	18	31	55	−24	29	
19	Francana	38	6	17	15	29	42	−13	29	Relegation Playoff
20	XV de Piracicaba	38	7	9	22	28	55	−27	23	Relegated

Updated to match(es) played on October 26, 1980. Source: RSSSF.com
Rules for classification: 1) points; 2) wins; 3) goal difference; 4) number of goals scored.

Like in the previous year, the team with the fewest points would be relegated and the team with the second-fewest points would go to a playoff against the runner-up of the Second Level. as such, XV de Piracicaba was relegated and Francana had to dispute a playoff in neutral ground against Catanduvense.

==== Relegation Playoffs ====
Team 1	Series	Team 2	Game 1	Game 2	Game 3
Francana	4–0	Catanduvense	4–1	2–1	–
