= Agnaldo (footballer, born 1958) =

Brazilian footballer

Personal information
- Full name: Agnaldo da Silva Valentim
- Date of birth: 28 September 1958 (age 68)
- Place of birth: Aracaju, Brazil
- Height: 1.77 m (5 ft 10 in)
- Position: Striker

Youth career
- –1976: Cotinguiba

Senior career*
Years	Team	Apps	(Gls)
1977–1978	Cotinguiba		
1979	Confiança		
1979	Fluminense de Feira		
1980	Sergipe		
1981–1982	Santa Cruz		
1983–1985	São Paulo	87	(18)
1985–1986	Atlético Paranaense		
1986–1987	Atlético Mineiro		
1987–1988	Santo André		
1988	Atlético Paranaense		
1989	EC São Bernardo		
1989–1990	CSA		
1991	Mauaense		
- * Club domestic league appearances and goals as of 5 October 2023

Agnaldo da Silva Valentim (born 28 September 1958), simply known as Agnaldo, is a Brazilian former professional footballer who played as a striker.

== Career ==
Originally from football in the northeast, Agnaldo arrived at São Paulo in 1983 as an attempt to replace Serginho Chulapa, who had gone to Santos FC. Was part of the 1985 state championship squad. He graduated in biology after retiring from his career. In 2023 he became coach of the youth categories at Água Santa.

== Honours ==
São Paulo

- Campeonato Paulista: 1985
