= Sociedade Esportiva Guaxupé =

Esportiva
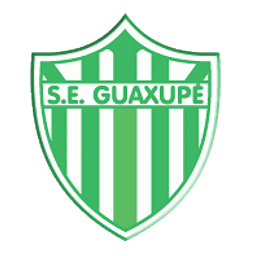
- Full name: Sociedade Esportiva Guaxupé
- Founded: 13 February 1952; 73 years ago
- Ground: Estádio Municipal Dr. Carlos Costa Monteiro
- Capacity: 3,000
- President: Rosemeri Clemente Benício
Home colors	Away colors

Sociedade Esportiva Guaxupé, simply known as Esportiva or Esportiva Guaxupé, is a Brazilian football club based in Guaxupé, Minas Gerais.

== History ==
The club was founded on 13 February 1952 with the merger of EC Mogiana, Palmeirinha FC and Vila Rica FC. The club entered professional football in 1975, directly in the elite of the Campeonato Mineiro, a time when there were no lower levels. Competed in the first division on five occasions (1975, 1976, 1979, 1980, 1981), with the best result as an 8th in 1980, and being relegated in 1981.

Esportiva last participation in professional football was in the 2016 Campeonato Mineiro Segunda Divisão, and in 2021 he signed up again to compete in the championship, but withdrew due to problems with the structure of the stadium.
