= Paulo César (footballer, born 1960) =

Brazilian footballer

Personal information
- Full name: Paulo César Camassutti
- Date of birth: 26 January 1960 (age 66)
- Place of birth: Taquaritinga, Brazil
- Position: Forward

Youth career
- 1976–1978: Botafogo (SP)

Senior career*
Years	Team	Apps	(Gls)
1977–1979	Botafogo (SP)		
1980–1984	São Paulo	261	(37)
1985–1986	Corinthians	123	(21)
1986–1987	Bellinzona		
1987–1991	Grasshopper		
1991	Coritiba		
1994	Taquaritinga		

International career
1981	Brazil	1	(0)
1983	Brazil U23	1	(0)

Managerial career
- 2003: Uberaba
- 2005: Juventude (MT)
Medal record
Men's Football
Representing Brazil
Pan American Games
Silver medal – second place	1983 Caracas
- * Club domestic league appearances and goals as of 25 August 2023

Paulo César Camassutti (born 26 January 1960), better known as Paulo César or Paulo César Capeta, is a Brazilian former professional footballer and manager who played as forward.

== Honours ==
=== São Paulo ===
- Campeonato Paulista: 1980, 1981

=== Botafogo ===
- Taça Cidade de São Paulo: 1977

=== Corinthians ===
- Copa das Nações: 1985

=== Brazil U23 ===
- 1983 Pan American Games: (silver) Silver medal

=== Individual ===
- Bola de Prata: 1981

== International career ==
Paulo César just called up once time, in the friendly match against Chile, 14 March 1981. He is also part of squad who reprensented Brazil at the 1983 Pan American Games and conquered the silver medal.

== See also ==
- List of Pan American medalists for Brazil
- List of Pan American Games medalists in football
