= Estádio Bruno José Daniel =

Soccer stadium in Santo André, Brazil

- Brunão
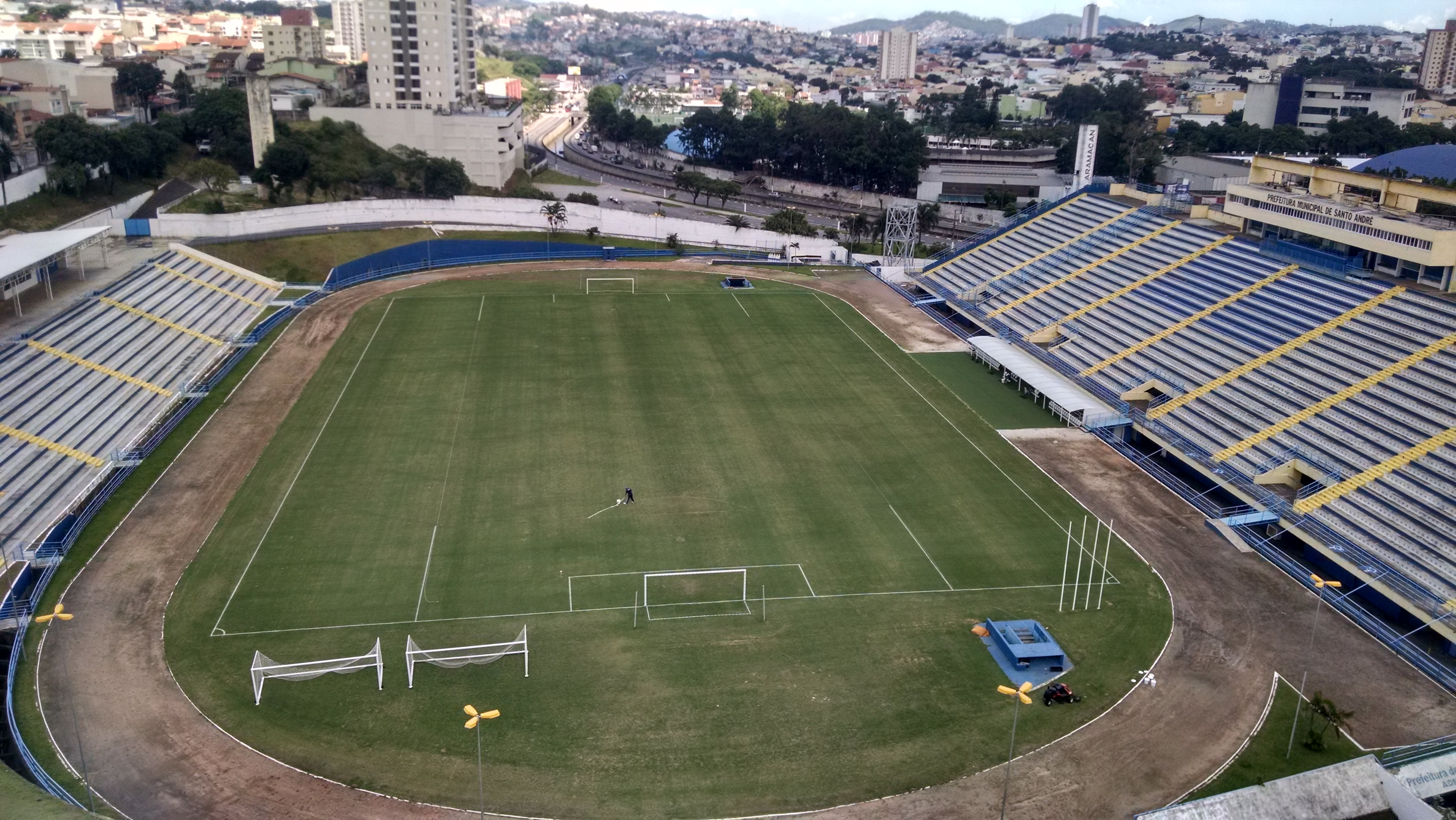
- Interactive map of Estádio Bruno José Daniel
- Full name: Estádio Municipal Bruno José Daniel
- Location: Santo André, São Paulo state
- Coordinates: 23°40′10″S 46°30′33″W
- Owner: Municipality of Santo André
- Capacity: 12,000
- Surface: Synthetic grass
- Field size: 105 by 68 metres (114.8 yd × 74.4 yd)
- Public transit: Prefeito Celso Daniel - Santo André

Construction
- Built: 1969
- Opened: December 14, 1969

Tenant
- Esporte Clube Santo André

The Estádio Bruno José Daniel, sometimes called Brunão or Estádio Municipal Bruno José Daniel, is a football stadium in Santo André, São Paulo state. The stadium, which opened on December 14, 1969, has a maximum capacity of 18,000 people. It is owned by the City Hall of Santo André, and is the home of Santo André. Its formal name honors Bruno José Daniel, who was mayor of Santo André at the time of the stadium's construction.

== History ==
The stadium's inaugural match was played on December 14, 1969, when Sociedade Esportiva Palmeiras beat Santo André 4–0.

The stadium's attendance record currently stands at 19,000, set on June 3, 1979 when Santo André beat Corinthians 2–1.

In 1985, the stadium hosted a Menudos band show. This event damaged the field. The Municipal Prefecture of Santo André only fixed the field a year later, due to lack of funds.

In 2005, Estádio Bruno José Daniel was used for the first time in a Copa Libertadores game. On March 10 of that year, Santo André and Cerro Porteño of Paraguay drew 2-2.
