= Darío Pereyra =

Uruguayan footballer (born 1956)

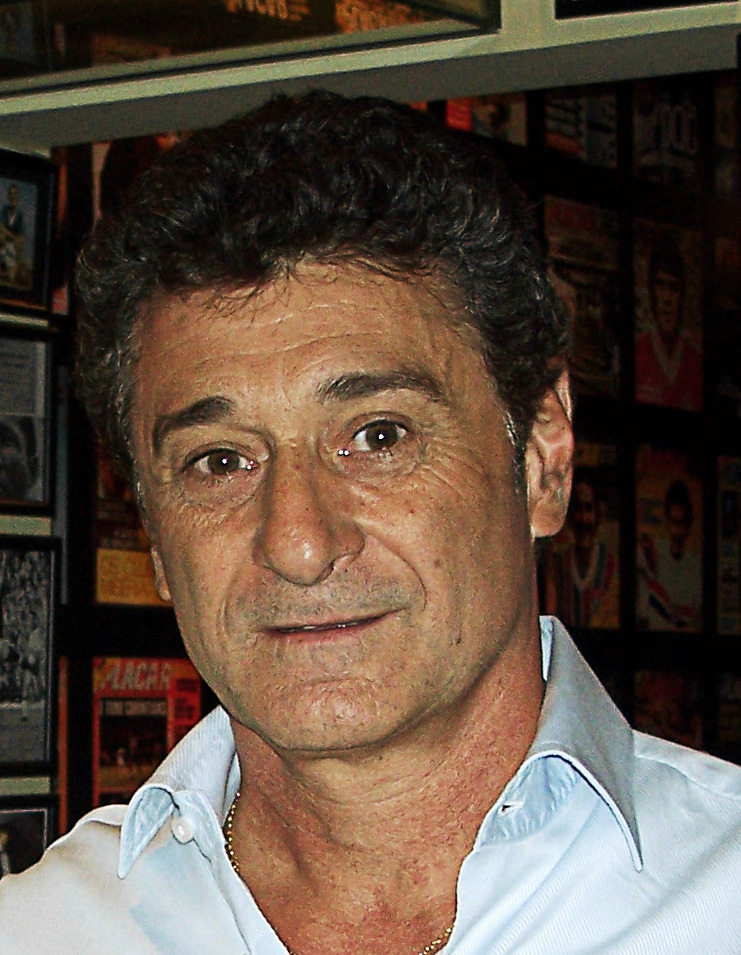

Personal information
- Full name: Alfonso Darío Pereyra Bueno
- Date of birth: 20 October 1956 (age 70)
- Place of birth: Montevideo, Uruguay
- Height: 1.84 m (6 ft 1/2 in)
- Position: Defender

Youth career
- Club Nacional de Football

Senior career*
Years	Team	Apps	(Gls)
1975–1977	Nacional		
1977–1988	São Paulo	130	(11)
1988	Flamengo	11	(0)
1989	Palmeiras	5	(1)
1990–1992	Matsushita Electronic	17	(3)

International career
1975–1986	Uruguay	32	(5)

Managerial career
- 1997–1998: São Paulo
- 1998: Coritiba
- 1999: Atlético Mineiro
- 2000: Guarani
- 2001: Corinthians
- 2003: Paysandu
- 2003: Grêmio
- 2004: Portuguesa
- 2012: Arapongas
- 2013: Vila Nova
- 2014: Águia de Marabá
Medal record
Representing Uruguay
CONMEBOL–UEFA Cup of Champions
Runner-up	1985 France
- * Club domestic league appearances and goals

Alfonso Darío Pereyra Bueno (born 19 October 1956) is a Uruguayan former football player. Having played as a midfielder for Club Nacional de Football in his home country, he reached stardom playing for São Paulo FC as a centre-back along with Oscar. He is still remembered and revered as one of the best centre-backs in the history of Brazilian football.

Legend has it that, whilst returning from a victory in an away match that crowned São Paulo the Brazilian champions, he wouldn't understand what the fuss was all about, but the supporters would not let him sleep. He had won a few times the national championship in Uruguay, so he felt that winning the Brazilian championship was nothing special. He later realized how difficult it is to win a Brazilian National title. It had been the first time São Paulo F.C. won that championship.

== Career ==
=== Playing career ===
Darío Pereyra started his career at the Nacional de Montevideo and debuted at the Uruguay national squad when he was only 18, becoming the captain of the national team at 19. After having scored 14 goals in 34 matches for the Nacional, São Paulo F.C. hired him on 17 October 1977 for 5 million cruzeiros, the second largest sum to be ever paid for a player at the time in Brazil. He arrived at the Congonhas airport wearing a São Paulo jersey, and was received warmly by the supporters of that team. Pereyra was not able to play immediately after his arrival, for he did not have the necessary documentation to do so. In December 1977, Real Madrid CF made an offer that could have cut his São Paulo career short, but the player was not interested in playing in Spain at that particular time.

Throughout his time at São Paulo, he and Oscar, who was also a centre-back, became a line of defence that is frequently remembered as one of the best in that club's history. He played a total of 451 matches in that club, scoring 38 goals. After the 1988 São Paulo state championship, Pereyra has transferred to Flamengo, where he played only 11 matches. After that, he was hired by Palmeiras in early 1989, when he was already 32. In the following year, he played for two years at Gamba Osaka, then called Matsushita Electronic, where he would end his playing career.

Darío Pereyra also made regular appearances in the Uruguay national team, and has played in the 1986 FIFA World Cup.

=== Managerial career ===
Darío was an assistant manager at São Paulo when he took over the interim manager position in 1997, succeeding manager Muricy Ramalho. Under his management, São Paulo shook off a weak campaign in the São Paulo State Championship, but the team only obtained the vice-championship title and a 13th position in the Campeonato Brasileiro. After 1998, Pereyra was replaced by manager Nelsinho Baptista.

On 3 October 1998, Pereyra was the fifth manager to take up Coritiba in that very year. However, he managed to lead the team to six victories and five draws in 13 matches. At the end of the 1998 Brazilian championship, he managed Atlético Mineiro, where he eventually obtained the Minas Gerais State Championship in 1999.

=== Personal life ===
Pereyra is currently employed by football marketing company Traffic in Brazil as a supervisor responsible for discovering talented, young football players.

== Director of Football ==
- 2007: Avaí

== Honours ==
=== Club ===
São Paulo

- Campeonato Paulista: 1980, 1981, 1985, 1987
- Campeonato Brasileiro Série A: 1986

Individual

- Bola de Prata: 1981, 1983, 1986
