= Estádio Municipal Walter Ribeiro =

Football Stadium in Brazil

Coordinates: 23°29′22.40″S 47°26′56.60″W

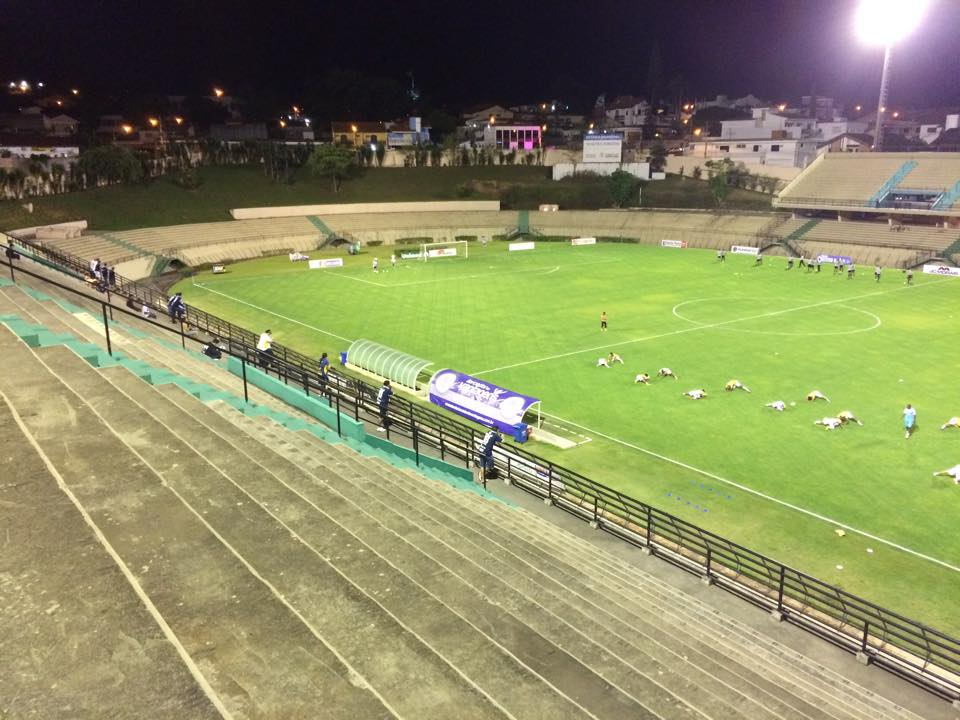
- Interactive map of Estádio Municipal Walter Ribeiro
- Full name: Estádio Municipal Walter Ribeiro
- Location: Sorocaba, São Paulo, Brazil
- Owner: Municipality of Sorocaba
- Capacity: 13,722
- Surface: Natural grass
- Field size: 105 by 68 metres (114.8 yd × 74.4 yd)

Construction
- Opened: October 14, 1978

Tenants
- São Bento (1978-); Atlético Sorocaba (1991-2016)

Estádio Municipal Walter Ribeiro is a stadium in Sorocaba, Brazil. It has a capacity of 13,722 spectators. It is the home of Esporte Clube São Bento and Clube Atlético Sorocaba.
