= Renato (footballer, born 1957) =

Brazilian footballer

Personal information
- Full name: Carlos Renato Frederico
- Date of birth: February 21, 1957 (age 69)
- Place of birth: Morungaba, Brazil
- Height: 1.82 m (6 ft 0 in)
- Position: Midfielder

Senior career*
Years	Team	Apps	(Gls)
1975–1980	Guarani		(70)
1980–1984	São Paulo	298	(100)
1985	Botafogo	17	(2)
1986–1989	Atlético Mineiro	205	(59)
1989–1992	Nissan Motors / Yokohama Marinos	64	(36)
1993	Kashiwa Reysol		
1994–1996	Ponte Preta		
1997	Taubaté		

International career
1979–1987	Brazil	22	(3)
- * Club domestic league appearances and goals

Carlos Renato Frederico (born 21 February 1957), best known as Renato, is a former association footballer who played as an offensive midfielder.

== Club career ==
In his career, Renato played for clubs Guarani (1975–1980), São Paulo (1980–1984), Botafogo (1985), Atlético Mineiro (1986–1989), in Japan with Nissan Motors / Yokohama Marinos (1989–1992), Kashiwa Reysol (1993), Ponte Preta (1994–1996) and Esporte Clube Taubaté (1997).

He won one Campeonato Brasileiro Série A (1978), two São Paulo State Tournament (1980, 1981), two Minas Gerais State Tournament (1986, 1988) and one Japan Soccer League Division 1 (1990). He received the Brazilian Silver Ball Award in 1987.

== International career ==
Renato obtained 22 international caps with the Brazil national football team between July 1979 to October 1983, scoring three goals. He was on the roster for the 1982 FIFA World Cup, and was named on the substitute's bench for several matches, but did not actually play during the tournament.

== Career statistics ==
=== Club ===
Club performance			League		State League		Continental	
Season	Club	League	Apps	Goals	Apps	Goals	Apps	Goals
1975	Guarani	Série A	17	5	-			
1976	Guarani	Série A	13	3		3	-	
1977	Guarani	Série A	14	6		9	-	
1978	Guarani	Série A	32	10		5	-	
1979	Guarani	Série A	-			18	10	1
1980	São Paulo	Série A	17	5	30	5	-	
1981	São Paulo	Série A	11	0	47	16	-	
1982	São Paulo	Série A	18	12	31	10	6	0
1983	São Paulo	Série A	22	13	38	18	-	
1984	São Paulo	Série A	14	3	31	7	-	
1985	Botafogo	Série A	17	2		1	-	
1986	Atlético Mineiro	Série A	27	4	18	4	-	
1987	Atlético Mineiro	Série A	17	8	32	4	-	
1988	Atlético Mineiro	Série A	23	8	24	11	-	
1989	Atlético Mineiro	Série A	0	0	26	10	-	
1989/90	Nissan Motors	JSL Division 1	22	17			-	
1990/91	Nissan Motors	JSL Division 1	22	10				3
1991/92	Nissan Motors	JSL Division 1	14	8				2
1992	Yokohama Marinos	J1 League	6	1	-			1
1994	Ponte Preta	Série A	-		+4	3	-	
1996	Ponte Preta	CPSA2	-			1		
1997	Taubaté	CPSA3	-			1	-	
Country	Brazil		242	79	+281	126	16	1
Country	Japan		64	36	-			6
Total			306	115	+281	126		7

=== International ===
Brazil
Year	Apps	Goals
1979	1	0
1980	6	0
1981	3	0
1982	2	1
1983	8	1
1984	0	0
1985	0	0
1986	0	0
1987	2	1
Total	22	3

== Honours ==
Individual

- Japan Soccer League First Division Top Scorer: 1989–90, 1990–91
