= Oscar (footballer, born 1954) =

Brazilian footballer

Personal information
- Full name: José Oscar Bernardi
- Date of birth: June 20, 1954 (age 72)
- Place of birth: Monte Sião, Brazil
- Height: 1.87 m (6 ft 2 in)
- Position: Centre back

Senior career*
Years	Team	Apps	(Gls)
1972–1979	Ponte Preta	34	(13)
1980	New York Cosmos	3	(0)
1980–1987	São Paulo	294	(6)
1987–1989	Nissan Motors	42	(5)

International career
1978–1986	Brazil	59	(2)

Managerial career
- 1989–1991: Nissan Motors
- 1992: AA Internacional
- 1992: Guarani
- 1993–1995: Al-Hilal
- 1995–1996: Kyoto Purple Sanga
- 1997: Al-Hilal
- 1997: Cruzeiro
- 1998: Al-Shabab
- 1999–2000: Al-Ittihad FC
- 2001–2003: Al-Ittihad FC
- * Club domestic league appearances and goals

José Oscar Bernardi (born 20 June 1954), known as Oscar, is a Brazilian former association footballer who played as a defender.

He notably played for the Brazil national football team at international level, and played as a starter in defence at the 1978 and 1982 FIFA World Cups, while he was a reserve in 1986. He was capped almost 60 times for Brazil between April 1978 and May 1986, and scored two goals. At club level, he played for São Paulo and Ponte Preta in Brazil.

Oscar also played for American side New York Cosmos in 1980 and Japanese team Nissan FC between 1987 and 1989. After his professional retirement, he coached several football clubs in Japan and Brazil. He now runs an athletic training center in Monte Sião, Minas Gerais. Oscar Bernardi founded a football club, named Brasilis Futebol Clube, in 2007.

== Personal life ==
Bernardi is Roman Catholic and has Italian roots due to his family.

== Career statistics ==
=== Club ===
Club performance			League	
Season	Club	League	Apps	Goals
Brazil			League	
1972	Ponte Preta		0	0
1973	Ponte Preta		0	0
1974	Ponte Preta		0	0
1975	Ponte Preta		0	0
1976	Ponte Preta	Série A	12	0
1977	Ponte Preta	Série A	16	1
1978	Ponte Preta	Série A	6	0
1979	Ponte Preta		0	0
United States			League	
1980	New York Cosmos	NASL	3	0
Brazil			League	
1980	São Paulo		0	0
1981	São Paulo	Série A	10	0
1982	São Paulo	Série A	16	0
1983	São Paulo	Série A	11	0
1984	São Paulo	Série A	12	2
1985	São Paulo	Série A	19	3
1986	São Paulo	Série A	9	1
1987	São Paulo		0	0
Japan			League	
1988	Nissan Motors	JSL	22	3
1989	Nissan Motors	JSL	20	2
Country	Brazil		111	7
Country	United States		3	0
Country	Japan		42	5
Total			156	12

=== International ===
Brazil national team
Year	Apps	Goals
1978	11	0
1979	1	0
1980	4	0
1981	13	0
1982	11	1
1983	0	0
1984	2	0
1985	11	0
1986	6	1
Total	59	2

== Managerial statistics ==
Team	From	To	Record				
Team	From	To	G	W	D	L	Win %
Kyoto Purple Sanga	1996	1996	15	0	0	15	0.00
Total			15	0	0	15	0.00

== Honours ==
=== Club ===
São Paulo

- Campeonato Paulista: 1980, 1981, 1985, 1987
- Campeonato Brasileiro Série A: 1986

Nissan Motors

- Japan Soccer League Division 1: 1988–89, 1989–90

=== Individual ===
- Brazilian Silver Ball: 1977
