= Esporte Clube XV de Novembro (Jaú) =

XV de Jaú
- Full name: Esporte Clube XV de Novembro
- Nickname: Galo da Comarca
- Founded: 15 November 1924; 101 years ago
- Ground: Estádio Zezinho Magalhães
- Capacity: 13,040
- President: Laercio Carneiro
- Head coach: Gilmar Rodrigues
- League: Campeonato Paulista Série A3
- 2025: Paulista Série A3, 11th of 16
- Website: www.xvdejau.com.br
| Home colors | Away colors | Third colors |

Esporte Clube XV de Novembro, more commonly referred to as XV de Jaú, is a Brazilian football club based in Jaú, São Paulo. The team compete in Campeonato Paulista A3 the third tier of the São Paulo state football league.

The club is also known as Galo da Comarca, roughly meaning "County's Rooster".

== History ==
On November 15, 1924, the club was founded as Esporte Clube XV de Novembro de Jaú by José Piragine Sobrinho, Hermínio Cappabianca and other sportsmen.

In 1951, XV de Jaú won the Campeonato Paulista Second Level, beating Linense of Lins in the final. The club then played the relegation/promotion play-off against Jabaquara, which was the last placed team of Campeonato Paulista First Level. XV de Jaú won the first leg, but was defeated in the second leg. In the third match against Jabaquara, the club beat its opponent and was promoted to the following year's Campeonato Paulista First Level.

In 1976, for the second time, the Campeonato Paulista Second Level was won by the club.

In 1979, the club competed for the first time in the top level of the Brazilian Championship, finishing in the 56th place.

Three years later, in 1982, XV de Jaú competed again in the Brazilian football's top-level league, finishing this time in the 20th position, ahead of clubs such as Internacional, Cruzeiro and Atlético Paranaense.

In 1988, the club competed in the third level of the Brazilian Championship, but was eliminated in the first stage of the competition, finishing in the last place of its group.

In early 2025, with the club under threat of relegation in the Campeonato Paulista Série A3, Sub-20 coach Isaque David Pereira was promoted as acting head coach for the senior team, as a regulatory workaround allowed him to lead from the sidelines while a new director of football assumed operational oversight.

== Honours ==
- Campeonato Paulista Série A2
  - Winners (2): 1951, 1976

== Stadium ==
XV de Jaú's home stadium is Estádio Zezinho Magalhães, inaugurated in 1973, with a maximum capacity of 13,040 people. The stadium is nicknamed Jauzão, meaning Big Jaú.
