= 1977 São Paulo FC season =

São Paulo
1977 season
- Chairman: Henri Couri Aidar
- Manager: Rubens Minelli
- Série A: Champions (1st title)
- Campeonato Paulista: Third stage
- Top goalscorer: League: Serginho (18); All: Serginho (50)

The 1977 football season was São Paulo's 48th season since club's existence.

== Statistics ==
=== Scorers ===
Position	Nation	Playing position	Name	Campeonato Paulista	Campeonato Brasileiro	Others	Total
1	(Brazil)	FW	Serginho	32	18	0	50
2	(Uruguay)	MF	Pedro Rocha	13	0	0	13
3	(Brazil)	FW	Zé Sérgio	8	3	0	11
4	(Brazil)	MF	Neca	0	7	0	7
5	(Brazil)	MF	Teodoro	4	2	0	6
6	(Brazil)	MF	Muricy	4	0	1	5
7	(Brazil)	DF	Getúlio	0	4	0	4
8	(Brazil)	DF	Bezerra	2	1	0	3
=	(Brazil)	FW	Müller	1	1	1	3
=	(Brazil)	DF	Tecão	0	0	3	3
=	(Brazil)	FW	Terto	3	0	0	3
9	(Brazil)	MF	Chicão	1	1	0	2
=	(Brazil)	FW	Mickey	1	0	1	2
=	(Brazil)	FW	Milton	1	0	1	2
=	(Brazil)	FW	Mirandinha	0	2	0	2
10	(Brazil)	FW	Frazão	1	0	0	1
=	(Brazil)	DF	Gilberto Sorriso	1	0	0	1
			Own goals	0	1	0	1
			Total	73	40	8	121

=== Overall ===
Games played	74 (21 Campeonato Paulista, 46 Campeonato Brasileiro, 9 Friendly match)
Games won	40 (13 Campeonato Paulista, 23 Campeonato Brasileiro, 4 Friendly match)
Games drawn	20 (4 Campeonato Paulista, 13 Campeonato Brasileiro, 3 Friendly match)
Games lost	16 (4 Campeonato Paulista, 10 Campeonato Brasileiro, 2 Friendly match)
Goals scored	121
Goals conceded	58
Goal difference	+59
Best result	6–1 (H) v Marília - Campeonato Paulista - 1977.07.13
Worst result	0–3 (A) v Portuguesa - Campeonato Paulista - 1977.03.27
Most appearances	
Top scorer	Serginho (50)

Source: São Paulo FC

== Friendlies ==
Jan 29 National	São José	0–0	São Paulo	São José dos Campos
				Stadium: Estádio Municipal Martins Pereira; Attendance: 4,074; Referee: José Guidotti

Feb 2 National	Velo Clube	0–1	São Paulo	Rio Claro
			Mickey 44'	Stadium: Estádio Benito Agnelo Castellano (Benitão); Referee: Orêncio Caputo

Feb 6 National	Francana	0–0	São Paulo	Franca
				Stadium: Estádio Municipal Doutor José Lancha Filho; Attendance: 11,904; Referee: Oscar Scolfaro

Feb 9 National	Aliança	0–1	São Paulo	São Bernardo do Campo
			Muricy 65'	Stadium: Estádio Humberto de Alencar Castelo Branco; Referee: José Pereira da Silva

Feb 24 National	Saad	2–2	São Paulo	Santo André
	Serginho 14'; Antoninho 74'		Milton 63'; Tecão 84'	Stadium: Jaçatuba; Referee: João Leopoldo Aieta

Mar 23 National	Goiás	3–1	São Paulo	Goiânia
	Marco Antônio 5', 16'; Piter 54'		Müller 89'	Stadium: Estádio do Governo do Estado de Goiás (Serra Dourada); Attendance: 10,970; Referee: José Vinhas

Oct 8 National	Linense	0–1	São Paulo	Lins
			Goal	Stadium: Estádio Gilberto Siqueira Lopes

=== Torneio Triangular Luiz Lamejo ===
Feb 15 National	Figueirense	1–0	São Paulo	Florianópolis
	Osnir 18'			Stadium: Estádio Orlando Scarpelli; Referee: José Carlos Bezerra

Feb 17 National	Avaí	1–2	São Paulo	Florianópolis
	Júlio César 90'		Tecão 85', 87'	Stadium: Estádio Orlando Scarpelli; Referee: José Carlos Bezerra

== Official competitions ==
=== Campeonato Pauista ===
Feb 12 First stage 1	São Paulo	0–0	Paulista	São Paulo
				Stadium: Estádio Cícero Pompeu de Toledo (Morumbi); Attendance: 6,336; Referee: Orêncio Caputo

Feb 27 First stage 2	Noroeste	2–3	São Paulo	Bauru
	Nélson Borges 19'; Nivaldo 69'		Serginho 13', 89'; Pedro Rocha 53'	Stadium: Estádio Dr. Alfredo de Castilho; Attendance: 7,372; Referee: Oscar Scolfaro

Mar 3 First stage 3	São Paulo	5–1	Portuguesa Santista	São Paulo
	Bezerra 29'; Pedro Rocha 41'; Serginho 48', 68'; Muricy 85'		Zé Luís 66'	Stadium: Estádio Cícero Pompeu de Toledo (Morumbi); Attendance: 3,163; Referee: Roberto Nunes Morgado

Mar 6 First stage 4	Marília	0–3	São Paulo	Marília
			Pedro Rocha 66'; Teodoro 69'; Muricy 84'	Stadium: Estádio Bento de Abreu; Referee: José de Assis Aragão

Mar 13 First stage 5	Palmeiras	3–2	São Paulo	São Paulo
	Toninho 2', 60'; Edu 57'		Serginho 36'; Pedro Rocha 78'	Stadium: Estádio Cícero Pompeu de Toledo (Morumbi); Attendance: 44,717; Referee: Dulcídio Wanderley Boschilia

Mar 16 First stage 6	São Paulo	2–0	XV de Jaú	São Paulo
	Teodoro 25'; Terto 57'			Stadium: Estádio Cícero Pompeu de Toledo (Morumbi); Attendance: 2,713; Referee: Almir Laguna

Mar 19 First stage 7	São Paulo	3–1	São Bento	São Paulo
	Serginho 36'; Terto 70'; Zé Sérgio 87'		Altimar 81'	Stadium: Estádio Cícero Pompeu de Toledo (Morumbi); Attendance: 6,775; Referee: Roberto Nunes Morgado

Mar 27 First stage 8	Portuguesa	3–0	São Paulo	São Paulo
	Enéas 6'; Bueno 64'; Alcino 69'			Stadium: Estádio Municipal Paulo Machado de Carvalho (Pacaembu); Attendance: 22,470; Referee: José de Assis Aragão

Mar 30 First stage 9	Botafogo	0–0	São Paulo	Ribeirão Preto
				Stadium: Estádio Santa Cruz; Referee: Romualdo Arppi Filho

Apr 6 First stage 10	São Paulo	3–1	Comercial	São Paulo
	Gilberto 17'; Zé Sérgio 53'; Teodoro 80'		Bernardo 41'	Stadium: Estádio Cícero Pompeu de Toledo (Morumbi); Attendance: 3,301; Referee: Sílvio Silveira

Apr 10 First stage 11	Guarani	1–2	São Paulo	Campinas
	Ziza 63'		Serginho 25'; Pedro Rocha 51'	Stadium: Estádio Brinco de Ouro da Princesa; Attendance: 15,902; Referee: José Faville Neto

Apr 13 First stage 12	São Paulo	2–0	América	São Paulo
	Zé Sérgio 71'; Muricy 75'			Stadium: Estádio Cícero Pompeu de Toledo (Morumbi); Attendance: 6,151; Referee: Roberto Nunes Morgado

Apr 17 First stage 13	Corinthians	1–0	São Paulo	São Paulo
	Geraldo 23'			Stadium: Estádio Cícero Pompeu de Toledo (Morumbi); Attendance: 40,429; Referee: José de Assis Aragão

Apr 21 First stage 14	Juventus	2–2	São Paulo	São Paulo
	Serginho 15'; Wilsinho 22'		Serginho 56', 59'	Stadium: Estádio Municipal Paulo Machado de Carvalho (Pacaembu); Attendance: 15,866; Referee: Márcio Salles

Apr 24 First stage 15	XV de Piracicaba	0–0	São Paulo	Piracicaba
				Stadium: Estádio Barão da Serra Negra; Attendance: 7,890; Referee: José Faville Neto

Apr 27 First stage 16	São Paulo	0–0	Ponte Preta	São Paulo
				Stadium: Estádio Cícero Pompeu de Toledo (Morumbi); Attendance: 7,486; Referee: Romualdo Arppi Filho

May 1 First stage 17	São Paulo	2–0	Santos	São Paulo
	Muricy 69'; Serginho 83'			Stadium: Estádio Cícero Pompeu de Toledo (Morumbi); Attendance: 34,769; Referee: Roberto Nunes Morgado

May 8 First stage 18	Ferroviária	0–1	São Paulo	Araraquara
			Antenor 70'	Stadium: Estádio Doutor Adhemar de Barros (Fonte Luminosa); Attendance: 8,709; Referee: Alfredo Gomes

May 15 Semifinal	São Paulo	3–1	Palmeiras	São Paulo
	Teodoro 30'; Zé Sérgio 40'; Pedro Rocha 64'		Toninho 70'	Stadium: Estádio Cícero Pompeu de Toledo (Morumbi); Attendance: 85,754; Referee: Oscar Scolfaro

May 18 Final	São Paulo	0–0	Botafogo	São Paulo
				Stadium: Estádio Cícero Pompeu de Toledo (Morumbi); Attendance: 56,187; Referee: Oscar Scolfaro

May 21 Second stage 1	São Paulo	1–3	Juventus	São Paulo
	Frazão 69'		Tadeu 33', 37'; Jaime 67' (o.g.)	Stadium: Estádio Municipal Paulo Machado de Carvalho (Pacaembu); Attendance: 10,677; Referee: José de Assis Aragão

May 29 Second stage 2	São Bento	0–3	São Paulo	Sorocaba
			Mickey 27'; Pedro Rocha 82'; Zé Sérgio 83'	Stadium: Estádio Humberto Reale; Attendance: 8,778; Referee: José Faville Neto

Jun 5 Second stage 3	São Paulo	0–0	Portuguesa	São Paulo
				Stadium: Estádio Cícero Pompeu de Toledo (Morumbi); Attendance: 8,176; Referee: José Faville Neto

Jun 9 Second stage 4	XV de Jaú	1–1	São Paulo	Jaú
	Valdomiro 27'		Bezerra 21'	Stadium: Estádio Zezinho Magalhães; Attendance: 16,918; Referee: José Faville Neto

Jun 12 Second stage 5	América	2–0	São Paulo	São José do Rio Preto
	Sérgio 74'; Baiano 87'			Stadium: Estádio Mário Alves Mendonça; Referee: Márcio Salles

Jun 18 Second stage 6	São Paulo	2–1	Noroeste	São Paulo
	Pedro Rocha 82'; Serginho 88'		Nálson Borges 71'	Stadium: Estádio Cícero Pompeu de Toledo (Morumbi); Attendance: 2,431; Referee: Nilson Bilha

Jun 25 Second stage 7	Paulista	1–5	São Paulo	Jundiaí
	Daércio 77'		Serginho 5', 35'; Zé Sérgio 29'; Pedro Rocha 32', 48'	Stadium: Estádio Dr. Jayme Pinheiro de Ulhoa Cintra; Attendance: 5,020; Referee: Oscar Scolfaro

Jun 29 Second stage 8	São Paulo	0–1	Ferroviária	São Paulo
			Maurício 34'	Stadium: Estádio Cícero Pompeu de Toledo (Morumbi); Attendance: 2,620; Referee: José de Assis Aragão

Jul 3 Second stage 9	Santos	0–3	São Paulo	São Paulo
			Serginho 17', 26', 58'	Stadium: Estádio Municipal Paulo Machado de Carvalho (Pacaembu); Attendance: 29,088; Referee: Oscar Scolfaro

Jul 9 Second stage 10	Comercial	0–0	São Paulo	Ribeirão Preto
				Stadium: Estádio Doutor Francisco de Palma Travassos; Attendance: 9,110; Referee: Roberto Nunes Morgado

Jul 13 Second stage 11	São Paulo	6–1	Marília	São Paulo
	Serginho 2', 34', 45', 51'; Zé Sérgio 3'; Pedro Rocha 73'		Ferreira 31'	Stadium: Estádio Municipal Paulo Machado de Carvalho (Pacaembu); Attendance: 7,814; Referee: Márcio Salles

Jul 17 Second stage 12	Portuguesa Santista	0–2	São Paulo	Santos
			Serginho 1'; Zé Sérgio 30'	Stadium: Estádio Urbano Caldeira (Vila Belmiro); Attendance: 7,827; Referee: Joel Caíres

Jul 23 Second stage 13	São Paulo	4–0	XV de Piracicaba	São Paulo
	Serginho 40', 45', 64'; Milton 52'			Stadium: Estádio Cícero Pompeu de Toledo (Morumbi); Attendance: 8,492; Referee: José de Assis Aragão

Jul 31 Second stage 14	Ponte Preta	0–0	São Paulo	Campinas
				Stadium: Estádio Moisés Lucarelli; Attendance: 21,441; Referee: José Faville Neto

Aug 3 Second stage 15	São Paulo	1–0	Botafogo	São Paulo
	Serginho 39'			Stadium: Estádio Municipal Paulo Machado de Carvalho (Pacaembu); Attendance: 12,585; Referee: Roberto Nunes Morgado

Aug 14 Second stage 16	Palmeiras	1–3	São Paulo	São Paulo
	Jorge Mendonça 60'		Pedro Rocha 25'; Müller 58'; Chicão 75'	Stadium: Estádio Cícero Pompeu de Toledo (Morumbi); Attendance: 26,300; Referee: José Faville Neto

Aug 17 Second stage 17	São Paulo	0–0	Guarani	São Paulo
				Stadium: Estádio Municipal Paulo Machado de Carvalho (Pacaembu); Attendance: 12,334; Referee: José de Assis Aragão

Aug 21 Second stage 18	Corinthians	1–0	São Paulo	São Paulo
	Geraldo 40'			Stadium: Estádio Cícero Pompeu de Toledo (Morumbi); Attendance: 70,094; Referee: Roberto Nunes Morgado

Aug 28 Semifinal	Corinthians	2–1	São Paulo	São Paulo
	Geraldo 9'; Luciano 103'		Serginho 60'	Stadium: Estádio Cícero Pompeu de Toledo (Morumbi); Attendance: 72,347; Referee: José de Assis Aragão

Sep 3 Third stage 1	Palmeiras	0–0	São Paulo	São Paulo
				Stadium: Estádio Cícero Pompeu de Toledo (Morumbi); Attendance: 47,137; Referee: José Faville Neto

Sep 7 Third stage 2	São Paulo	1–1	Portuguesa	São Paulo
	Terto 20'		Marinho 13'	Stadium: Estádio Cícero Pompeu de Toledo (Morumbi); Attendance: 11,530; Referee: José Faville Neto

Sep 14 Third stage 3	Santos	0–2	São Paulo	São Paulo
			Serginho 11', 77'	Stadium: Estádio Municipal Paulo Machado de Carvalho (Pacaembu); Attendance: 45,678; Referee: Dulcídio Wanderley Boschilia

Sep 17 Third stage 4	São Paulo	2–0	Botafogo	São Paulo
	Serginho 88', 92'			Stadium: Estádio Cícero Pompeu de Toledo (Morumbi); Attendance: 27,473; Referee: Romualdo Arppi Filho

Sep 21 Third stage 5	Ponte Preta	3–1	São Paulo	Campinas
	Rui Rei 35'; Dicá 48'; Parraga		Pedro Rocha 60'	Stadium: Estádio Moisés Lucarelli; Attendance: 25,548; Referee: José Faville Neto

Sep 24 Third stage 6	São Paulo	1–0	Guarani	São Paulo
	Serginho 7'			Stadium: Estádio Cícero Pompeu de Toledo (Morumbi); Attendance: 12,652; Referee: Romualdo Arppi Filho

Oct 2 Third stage 7	Corinthians	2–1	São Paulo	São Paulo
	Geraldo 42'; Romeu 55'		Serginho 77'	Stadium: Estádio Cícero Pompeu de Toledo (Morumbi); Attendance: 105,435; Referee: Oscar Scolfaro

==== Record ====
Final Position	Points	Matches	Wins	Draws	Losses	Goals For	Goals Away	Win%
5th	66	46	23	13	10	73	36	52%

=== Campeonato Brasileiro ===
Oct 16 First stage 1	Náutico	0–1	São Paulo	Recife
			Serginho 6'	Stadium: Estádio José do Rego Maciel (Arruda); Attendance: 7,999; Referee: Valquir Pimentel

Oct 19 First stage 2	Botafogo-PB	0–2	São Paulo	João Pessoa
			Getúlio 53'; Serginho 83'	Stadium: Estádio José Américo de Almeida Filho (Almeidão); Referee: José Roberto Wright

Oct 23 First stage 3	CSA	0–0	São Paulo	Maceió
				Stadium: Estádio Rei Pelé; Attendance: 21,059; Referee: Manuel de Lima

Nov 2 First stage 4	XV de Piracicaba	1–1	São Paulo	Piracicaba
	Volmil 62'		Getúlio 60'	Stadium: Estádio Barão da Serra Negra; Attendance: 19,951; Referee: Ulisses Tavares

Nov 6 First stage 5	São Paulo	0–2	Palmeiras	São Paulo
			Jorge Mendonça 50', 73'	Stadium: Estádio Municipal Paulo Machado de Carvalho (Pacaembu); Attendance: 31,027; Referee: Arnaldo César Coelho

Nov 13 First stage 6	São Paulo	1–0	Santa Cruz	São Paulo
	Müller 85'			Stadium: Estádio Municipal Paulo Machado de Carvalho (Pacaembu); Attendance: 31,012; Referee: Aírton de Morais

Nov 16 First stage 7	São Paulo	3–0	Treze	São Paulo
	Serginho 4', 19', 65'			Stadium: Estádio Municipal Paulo Machado de Carvalho (Pacaembu); Referee: José Carlos Bezerra

Nov 23 First stage 8	São Paulo	2–0	Sport	São Paulo
	Getúlio 1'; Neca 30'			Stadium: Estádio Municipal Paulo Machado de Carvalho (Pacaembu); Attendance: 12,938; Referee: José Marçal Filho

Nov 26 First stage 9	São Paulo	4–0	CRB	São Paulo
	Neca 3', 90'; Serginho 6', 56'			Stadium: Estádio Municipal Paulo Machado de Carvalho (Pacaembu); Attendance: 17,058; Referee: Mário de Souza

Dec 4 Second stage 1	Corinthians	2–0	São Paulo	São Paulo
	Geraldo 5'; Romeu 90'			Stadium: Estádio Municipal Paulo Machado de Carvalho (Pacaembu); Attendance: 56,036; Referee: Valquir Pimentel

Dec 7 Second stage 2	São Paulo	5–0	Brasília	São Paulo
	Serginho 7', 25'; Chicão 27'; Teodoro 56'; Neca 74'			Stadium: Estádio Municipal Paulo Machado de Carvalho (Pacaembu); Attendance: 4,267; Referee: Moacir dos Santos

Dec 11 Second stage 3	Internacional	1–4	São Paulo	Porto Alegre
	Escurinho 79'		Teodoro 8'; Serginho 31', 54'; Zé Sérgio 39'	Stadium: Estádio José Pinheiro Borba (Beira-Rio); Attendance: 38,142; Referee: José Roberto Wright

Dec 18 Second stage 4	America-RJ	0–0	São Paulo	Rio de Janeiro
				Stadium: Estádio Jornalista Mário Filho (Maracanã); Attendance: 18,428; Referee: Bráulio Zanotto

Jan 28, 1978 Third stage 1	São Paulo	4–2	XV de Piracicaba	São Paulo
	Serginho 26', 55'; Zé Sérgio 43'; Neca 63'		Roberto 12'; Perrela 61'	Stadium: Estádio Cícero Pompeu de Toledo (Morumbi); Attendance: 22,606; Referee: Almir Laguna

Feb 1, 1978 Third stage 2	Ponte Preta	1–3	São Paulo	Campinas
	Tuta 21'		Neca 6'; Serginho 10', 88'	Stadium: Estádio Moisés Lucarelli; Attendance: 34,985; Referee: Mário de Souza

Feb 12, 1978 Third stage 3	Botafogo-SP	1–0	São Paulo	Ribeirão Preto
	Sócrates 58'			Stadium: Estádio Santa Cruz; Attendance: 30,592; Referee: Oscar Scolfaro

Feb 15, 1978 Third stage 4	São Paulo	4–3	Sport	São Paulo
	Tolar 39' (o.g.); Bezerra 45'; Zé Sérgio 54'; Mirandinha 58'		Miltão 10'; Pita 27'; Darci 80'	Stadium: Estádio Cícero Pompeu de Toledo (Morumbi); Attendance: 13,461; Referee: Luís Carlos Félix

Feb 19, 1978 Third stage 5	São Paulo	3–1	Grêmio	São Paulo
	Getúlio 23'; Serginho 40'; Mirandinha 53'		Éder 79'	Stadium: Estádio Cícero Pompeu de Toledo (Morumbi); Attendance: 73,765; Referee: Arnaldo Cezar Coelho

Feb 26, 1978 Semifinals	São Paulo	3–0	Operário	São Paulo
	Serginho 77', 90+3'; Neca 72'			Stadium: Estádio Cícero Pompeu de Toledo (Morumbi); Attendance: 103,092; Referee: José Roberto Wright

Mar 1, 1978 Semifinals	Operário	1–0	São Paulo	Campo Grande
	Tadeu 79'			Stadium: Estádio Universitário Pedro Pedrossian (Morenão); Attendance: 20,161; Referee: Luís Carlos Félix

Mar 5, 1978 Final	Atlético Mineiro	0–0 (2–3 p)	São Paulo	Belo Horizonte
				Stadium: Estádio Governador Magalhães Pinto (Mineirão); Attendance: 102,974; Referee: Arnaldo Cezar Coelho
	Penalties
	Toninho Cerezo (penalty missed); Ziza (penalty scored); Alves (penalty scored); Joãozinho Paulista (penalty missed); Márcio Gugu (penalty missed)		Getúlio (penalty missed); Chicão (penalty missed); Peres (penalty scored); Antenor (penalty scored); Bezerra (penalty scored)

==== Record ====
Final Position	Points	Matches	Wins	Draws	Losses	Goals For	Goals Away	Win%
1st	40	21	13	4	4	40	15	63%
