= 1978 São Paulo FC season =

São Paulo
1978 season
- Chairman: Henri Couri Aidar; Antônio Leme Nunes Galvão
- Manager: Rubens Minelli
- Campeonato Brasileiro: 19th
- Copa Libertadores: Group stage
- Campeonato Paulista: Runners-up
- Top goalscorer: League: Milton (14); All: Milton (22)

The 1978 season was São Paulo's 49th season since club's existence.

== Statistics ==
=== Scorers ===
Position	Nation	Playing position	Name	Copa Libertadores	Campeonato Brasileiro	Campeonato Paulista	Others	Total
1	(Brazil)	FW	Milton	0	14	7	1	22
2	(Brazil)	FW	Serginho	0	0	14	0	14
3	(Brazil)	MF	Neca	0	6	6	1	13
4	(Brazil)	FW	Edu Bala	1	0	10	0	11
5	(Brazil)	FW	Zé Sérgio	1	3	4	2	10
6	(Brazil)	DF	Bezerra	0	4	2	0	6
=	(Uruguay)	DF	Darío Pereyra	2	4	0	0	6
7	(Brazil)	FW	Mirandinha	1	4	0	0	5
8	(Brazil)	MF	Muricy	0	0	4	0	4
9	(Brazil)	MF	Viana	0	2	1	0	3
10	(Brazil)	MF	Armando	0	0	2	0	2
=	(Brazil)	DF	Getúlio	0	1	1	0	2
=	(Brazil)	MF	Teodoro	0	1	1	0	2
=	(Brazil)	FW	Zequinha	0	2	0	0	2
11	(Brazil)	MF	Chicão	0	0	1	0	1
=	(Brazil)	DF	Marião	0	0	1	0	1
=	(Brazil)	FW	Müller	0	0	1	0	1
=	(Brazil)	MF	Valtinho	0	0	0	1	1
			Own goals	0	1	3	0	4
			Total	6	42	61	17	126

=== Overall ===
Games played	87 (6 Copa Libertadores, 26 Campeonato Brasileiro, 52 Campeonato Paulista, 3 Friendly match)
Games won	36 (1 Copa Libertadores, 10 Campeonato Brasileiro, 24 Campeonato Paulista, 1 Friendly match)
Games drawn	28 (3 Copa Libertadores, 8 Campeonato Brasileiro, 15 Campeonato Paulista, 2 Friendly match)
Games lost	23 (2 Copa Libertadores, 8 Campeonato Brasileiro, 13 Campeonato Paulista, 0 Friendly match)
Goals scored	126
Goals conceded	80
Goal difference	+46
Best result	6–1 (H) v Ríver - Campeonato Brasileiro - 1978.04.06
Worst result	1–4 (A) v Santos - Campeonato Paulista - 1979.01.28
Most appearances	
Top scorer	Milton (22)

Source: São Paulo FC

== Friendlies ==
Feb 11 National	Rhodia	0–1	São Paulo	Santo André
			Goal	Stadium: Estádio Bruno José Daniel

Feb 18 National	Rigesa	1–2	São Paulo	Valinhos
	Goal		Goal	Stadium: Vila Papelão

April 15 National	Guaxupé	2–4	São Paulo	Guaxupé
	Goal		Goal

May 1 National	Usina Santa Elisa	0–2	São Paulo	Sertãozinho
			Goal	Stadium: Estádio Frederico Dalmaso

Jul 27 National	São José	0–0	São Paulo	São José dos Campos
				Stadium: Estádio Municipal Martins Pereira; Referee: Roberto Nunes Morgado

Aug 27 National	Itararé	0–2	São Paulo	Itararé
			Goal	Stadium: Estádio Vergínio Holtz

Sep 7 Taça SBC	Aliança	1–1	São Paulo	São Bernardo do Campo
	Goal		Goal	Stadium: Estádio Humberto de Alencar Castelo Branco

Nov 19 National	Sãocarlense	1–2	São Paulo	São Carlos
	Bráulio 89'		Mílton 65'; Valtinho 74'	Stadium: Estádio Municipal Professor Luís Augusto de Oliveira; Attendance: 4,736; Referee: Roberto Nunes Morgado

March 3, 1979 National	Internacional	1–0	São Paulo	Limeira
	Netinho 31'			Stadium: Estádio Municipal Major José Levy Sobrinho; Attendance: 20,064; Referee: Edmundo Absamra

April 22, 1979 National	Internacional	1–3	São Paulo	Limeira
	Tião 27'		Neca 18'; Zé Sérgio 40', 48'	Stadium: Estádio Municipal Major José Levy Sobrinho; Referee: Emídio Marques de Mesquita

April 26, 1979 Taça Antônio Inácio	Vila Nova	0–0	São Paulo	Goiânia
				Stadium: Estádio do Governo do Estado de Goiás (Serra Dourada); Referee: José Brandão

April 29, 1979 National	São Paulo (Avaré)	1–2	São Paulo	Avaré
	Goal		Goal	Stadium: Estádio Doutor Paulo Araújo de Novaes

May 2, 1979 National	Esportiva	0–0	São Paulo	Guaratinguetá
				Stadium: Ninho da Garça

May 6, 1979 National	Americana	2–2	São Paulo	Americana
	Goal		Goal	Stadium: Estádio Décio Vitta

=== Copa dos Campeões da Copa Brasil ===
Aug 22 National	Atlético Mineiro	0–0 (4–2 p)	São Paulo	São Paulo
				Stadium: Estádio Cícero Pompeu de Toledo (Morumbi); Attendance: 19,535; Referee: José Roberto Wright

== Official competitions ==
=== Copa Libertadores ===
Group 3 standings
Team	Pld	W	D	L	GF	GA	GD	Pts	Qualification
(Brazil) Atlético Mineiro	6	4	2	0	16	8	+8	10	Qualified to the Semi-Finals
(Chile) Unión Española	6	1	4	1	7	10	−3	6	
(Brazil) São Paulo	6	1	3	2	6	7	−1	5	
(Chile) Palestino	6	1	1	4	8	12	−4	3	

Mar 15 Group stage 1	Atlético Mineiro (Brazil)	1–1	(Brazil) São Paulo	Belo Horizonte
	Serginho 40'		Pereyra 15'	Stadium: Estádio Governador Magalhães Pinto (Mineirão); Attendance: 30,000; Referee: Arnaldo César Coelho

Mar 22 Group stage 2	Palestino (Chile)	0–1	(Brazil) São Paulo	Santiago
			Pereyra 44'	Stadium: Estadio Nacional Julio Martínez Prádanos (Nacional); Attendance: 31,766; Referee: César Pagano (Peru)

Mar 26 Group stage 3	Unión Española (Chile)	1–1	(Brazil) São Paulo	Santiago
	Penedo 50'		Edu 49'	Stadium: Estadio Nacional Julio Martínez Prádanos (Nacional); Attendance: 24,724; Referee: Ramón Barreto (Uruguay)

Apr 9 Group stage 4	São Paulo (Brazil)	1–2	(Brazil) Atlético Mineiro	São Paulo
	Mirandinha 28'		Serginho 21'; Paulo Isidoro 76'	Stadium: Estádio Cícero Pompeu de Toledo (Morumbi); Attendance: 76,994; Referee: Romualdo Arppi Filho

Apr 16 Group stage 5	São Paulo (Brazil)	1–2	(Chile) Palestino	São Paulo
	Zé Sérgio 61'		Fabiani 48'; Pinto 69'	Stadium: Estádio Cícero Pompeu de Toledo (Morumbi); Attendance: 14,621; Referee: Miguel Comesanã (Argentina)

Apr 20 Group stage 6	São Paulo (Brazil)	1–1	(Chile) Unión Española	São Paulo
	Milton Cruz 53'		Carvalho 59'	Stadium: Estádio Cícero Pompeu de Toledo (Morumbi); Attendance: 1,782; Referee: Angel Coerezza (Argentina)

==== Record ====
Final Position	Points	Matches	Wins	Draws	Losses	Goals For	Goals Away	Win%
13th	5	6	1	3	2	6	7	41%

=== Campeonato Brasileiro ===
Mar 30 First stage 1	São Paulo	2–0	Fortaleza	São Paulo
	Zé Sérgio 1'; Neca 38'			Stadium: Estádio Cícero Pompeu de Toledo (Morumbi); Attendance: 8,996; Referee: José Aldo Pereira

Apr 2 First stage 2	Comercial	0–1	São Paulo	Ribeirão Preto
			Mirandinha 61'	Stadium: Estádio Doutor Francisco de Palma Travassos; Attendance: 16,596; Referee: José Marçal Filho

Apr 6 First stage 3	São Paulo	6–1	Ríver	São Paulo
	Cláudio 14' (o.g.); Zé Sérgio 18', 80'; Pereyra 45'; Neca 48'; Mirandinha 65'		Sima 76'	Stadium: Estádio Cícero Pompeu de Toledo (Morumbi); Attendance: 7,180; Referee: José Muniz Brandão

Apr 12 First stage 4	América	1–0	São Paulo	São José do Rio Preto
	Pedrinho 2'			Stadium: Estádio Mário Alves de Mendonça; Attendance: 16,763; Referee: José Roberto Wright

Apr 23 First stage 5	São Paulo	0–0	Palmeiras	São Paulo
				Stadium: Estádio Cícero Pompeu de Toledo (Morumbi); Attendance: 31,290; Referee: Wilson dos Santos

Apr 27 First stage 6	Flamengo-PI	0–3	São Paulo	Teresina
			Bezerra 14'; Zequinha 16'; Pereyra 20'	Stadium: Estádio Governador Alberto Tavares Silva; Attendance: 9,548; Referee: Armindo Tavares

Apr 30 First stage 7	Ceará	2–1	São Paulo	Fortaleza
	Ivanir 40'; Tércio 84'		Neca 10'	Stadium: Estádio Governador Plácido Aderaldo Castelo (Castelão); Attendance: 21,102; Referee: Moacir Miguel dos Santos

May 3 First stage 8	Sampaio Corrêa	2–2	São Paulo	São luís
	Cabecinha 19', 30'		Pereyra 15'; Neca 67'	Stadium: Estádio Municipal Nhozinho Santos; Referee: Benedito de Aguiar

May 7 First stage 9	São Paulo	6–2	Botafogo-SP	São Paulo
	Milton 10', 37'; Zequinha 45'; Neca 55'; Mirandinha 77', 85'		Wilson Campos 28'; Arlindo 63'	Stadium: Estádio Cícero Pompeu de Toledo (Morumbi); Attendance: 8,517; Referee: José Carlos Menqden

May 10 First stage 10	Noroeste	1–0	São Paulo	Bauru
	Jairzinho 89'			Stadium: Estádio Dr. Alfredo de Castilho; Attendance: 9,893; Referee: José Valeriano Correia

May 14 First stage 11	São Paulo	2–0	Moto Club	São Paulo
	Milton 41', 46'			Stadium: Estádio Cícero Pompeu de Toledo (Morumbi); Attendance: 5,697; Referee: Giese de Couto

May 21 Second stage 1	Guarani	1–1	São Paulo	Campinas
	Zenon 83'		Getúlio 71'	Stadium: Estádio Brinco de Ouro da Princesa; Attendance: 12,519; Referee: Edmundo Abssanra

May 24 Second stage 2	São Paulo	4–1	Coritiba	São Paulo
	Milton 9', 45', 46', 65'		Almir 85'	Stadium: Estádio Cícero Pompeu de Toledo (Morumbi); Attendance: 2,652; Referee: Luís Carlos Féliz

May 30 Second stage 3	São Paulo	4–1	Villa Nova	São Paulo
	Milton 4', 30'; Bezerra 25', 85'		Estevam 86' (o.g.)	Stadium: Estádio Cícero Pompeu de Toledo (Morumbi); Attendance: 2,104; Referee: Carlos Costa

Jun 4 Second stage 4	Vasco da Gama	1–2	São Paulo	Rio de Janeiro
	Guina 73'		Milton 19'; Neca 36'	Stadium: Estádio Jornalista Mário Filho (Maracanã); Attendance: 24,713; Referee: José Luís Barreto

Jun 7 Second stage 5	São Paulo	0–0	Brasília	São Paulo
				Stadium: Estádio Cícero Pompeu de Toledo (Morumbi); Attendance: 3,736; Referee: José Aldo Pereira

Jun 10 Second stage 6	Portuguesa	2–1	São Paulo	São Paulo
	Enéas 22'; Naldo 61'		Teodoro 5'	Stadium: Estádio Municipal Paulo Machado de Carvalho (Pacaembu); Attendance: 9,245; Referee: Almir Ricci

Jun 17 Second stage 7	Caxias	0–0	São Paulo	Caxias do Sul
				Stadium: Estádio Francisco Stédile (Centenário); Attendance: 3,963; Referee: Afonso de Oliveira

Jun 20 Second stage 8	São Paulo	1–0	Remo	São Paulo
	Viana 12'			Stadium: Estádio Municipal Paulo Machado de Carvalho (Pacaembu); Attendance: 6,711; Referee: Aírton de Morais

Jul 2 Third stage 1	São Paulo	0–1	Grêmio	São Paulo
			André 16'	Stadium: Estádio Cícero Pompeu de Toledo (Morumbi); Attendance: 9,205; Referee: Hélio Cosso

Jul 5 Third stage 2	São Paulo	2–2	Noroeste	São Paulo
	Milton 44'; Viana 65'		Marco Antônio 9'; Baroninho 75'	Stadium: Estádio Cícero Pompeu de Toledo (Morumbi); Attendance: 4,021; Referee: José de Assis Aragão

Jul 9 Third stage 3	São Paulo	1–1	Palmeiras	São Paulo
	Milton 85'		Beto Fuscão 87'	Stadium: Estádio Cícero Pompeu de Toledo (Morumbi); Attendance: 39,737; Referee: Márcio Campos Salles

Jul 12 Third stage 4	São Paulo	0–0	Flamengo	São Paulo
				Stadium: Estádio Cícero Pompeu de Toledo (Morumbi); Attendance: 9,291; Referee: Manuel de Lima

Jul 15 Third stage 5	América-RJ	2–1	São Paulo	Rio de Janeiro
	Aílton 35', 73'		Milton 40'	Stadium: Estádio Jornalista Mário Filho (Maracanã); Attendance: 13,031; Referee: Maurílio Santiago

Jul 19 Third stage 6	Coritiba	2–1	São Paulo	Curitiba
	Deodoro 60'; Bezerra 84' (o.g.)		Pereyra 46'	Stadium: Estádio Major Antônio Couto Pereira; Attendance: 3,651; Referee: Manuel Serapião

Jul 23 Third stage 7	Botafogo	2–1	São Paulo	Rio de Janeiro
	Dé 10'; Ricardo 36'		Bezerra 88'	Stadium: Estádio Jornalista Mário Filho (Maracanã); Attendance: 18,081; Referee: Armindo Tavares

==== Record ====
Final Position	Points	Matches	Wins	Draws	Losses	Goals For	Goals Away	Win%
19th	33	26	10	8	8	42	25	42%

=== Campeonato Paulista ===
Aug 20 First stage 1	Marília	0–1	São Paulo	Marília
			Müller 71'	Stadium: Estádio Municipal Bento de Abreu Sampaio Vidal; Attendance: 18,423; Referee: José de Assis Aragão

Aug 27 First stage 2	Portuguesa	1–1	São Paulo	São Paulo
	Dentinho 49'		Nelsinho 28' (o.g.)	Stadium: Estádio Municipal Paulo Machado de Carvalho (Pacaembu); Attendance: 25,282; Referee: José Favilli Neto

Aug 30 First stage 3	São Paulo	1–0	XV de Piracicaba	São Paulo
	Vadinho 45' (o.g.)			Stadium: Estádio Cícero Pompeu de Toledo (Morumbi); Attendance: 1,586; Referee: Roberto Nunes Morgado

Sep 3 First stage 4	São Paulo	2–1	Botafogo	São Paulo
	Neca 11'; Edu 44'		Paulo César 63'	Stadium: Estádio Cícero Pompeu de Toledo (Morumbi); Attendance: 8,591; Referee: Márcio Campos Sales

Sep 7 First stage 5	Ferroviária	0–1	São Paulo	Araraquara
			Armando 75'	Stadium: Estádio Doutor Adhemar de Barros (Fonte Luminosa); Attendance: 8,225; Referee: Sílvio Acácio Silveira

Sep 10 First stage 6	São Paulo	0–0	Palmeiras	São Paulo
				Stadium: Estádio Cícero Pompeu de Toledo (Morumbi); Attendance: 28,854; Referee: Romualdo Arppi Filho

Sep 17 First stage 7	Noroeste	0–2	São Paulo	Bauru
			Neca 22'; Milton 50'	Stadium: Estádio Dr. Alfredo de Castilho; Attendance: 11,624; Referee: Sílvio Acácio Silveira

Sep 20 First stage 8	São Paulo	1–0	XV de Jaú	São Paulo
	Neca 47'			Stadium: Estádio Municipal Paulo Machado de Carvalho (Pacaembu); Attendance: 14,366; Referee: Roberto Nunes Morgado

Sep 23 First stage 9	São Paulo	1–0	Ponte Preta	São Paulo
	Milton 42'			Stadium: Estádio Cícero Pompeu de Toledo (Morumbi); Attendance: 24,553; Referee: Márcio Campos Sales

Sep 27 First stage 10	Paulista	0–0	São Paulo	Jundiaí
				Stadium: Estádio Doutor Jayme Pinheiro de Ulhôa Cintra; Attendance: 14,799; Referee: Sílvio Acácio Silveira

Oct 1 First stage 11	São Paulo	1–3	Santos	São Paulo
	Neca 47'		Juari 33', 39', 81'	Stadium: Estádio Cícero Pompeu de Toledo (Morumbi); Attendance: 91,962; Referee: Roberto Nunes Morgado

Oct 5 First stage 12	São Paulo	1–0	América	São Paulo
	Milton 53'			Stadium: Estádio Municipal Paulo Machado de Carvalho (Pacaembu); Attendance: 8,335; Referee: Dulcídio Wanderley Boschilia

Oct 8 First stage 13	Guarani	3–0	São Paulo	Campinas
	Osnir 10'; Capitão 61'; Paulo Borges 89'			Stadium: Estádio Brinco de Ouro da Princesa; Attendance: 16,829; Referee: Romualdo Arppi Filho

Oct 11 First stage 14	São Paulo	1–0	Portuguesa Santista	São Paulo
	Milton 82'			Stadium: Estádio Municipal Paulo Machado de Carvalho (Pacaembu); Attendance: 6,147; Referee: Joel Teixeira Caires

Oct 14 First stage 15	São Bento	0–1	São Paulo	Sorocaba
			Edu 37'	Stadium: Centro de Integração Comunitário Walter Ribeiro; Attendance: 20,928; Referee: Márcio Campos Sales

Oct 19 First stage 16	São Paulo	0–2	Francana	São Paulo
			Antenor 55'; Delém 88'	Stadium: Estádio Municipal Paulo Machado de Carvalho (Pacaembu); Attendance: 3,637; Referee: Oscar Scolfaro

Oct 22 First stage 17	Juventus	1–2	São Paulo	São Paulo
	Tião 86'		Edu 7', 13'	Stadium: Estádio Municipal Paulo Machado de Carvalho (Pacaembu); Attendance: 12,043; Referee: José Favilli Neto

Oct 29 First stage 18	Comercial	0–1	São Paulo	Ribeirão Preto
			Bezerra 28'	Stadium: Estádio Doutor Francisco de Palma Travassos; Attendance: 7,232; Referee: Márcio Campos Sales

Nov 5 First stage 19	Corinthians	1–1	São Paulo	São Paulo
	Basílio 12'		Armando 26'	Stadium: Estádio Cícero Pompeu de Toledo (Morumbi); Attendance: 19,059; Referee: Romualdo Arppi Filho

Nov 11 Quarterfinals	São Paulo	0–0	Santos	São Paulo
				Stadium: Estádio Cícero Pompeu de Toledo (Morumbi); Attendance: 21,920; Referee: Oscar Scolfaro

Nov 26 Second stage 1	Botafogo	2–0	São Paulo	Ribeirão Preto
	Zito 54'; Arlindo 64'			Stadium: Estádio Santa Cruz; Attendance: 7,719; Referee: Sílvio Acácio Silveira

Dec 2 Second stage 2	São Paulo	3–1	Marília	São Paulo
	Bezerra 16'; Edu 68'; Muricy 80'		Prado 81'	Stadium: Estádio Cícero Pompeu de Toledo (Morumbi); Attendance: 7,139; Referee: José Favalli Neto

Dec 10 Second stage 3	São Paulo	0–0	Corinthians	São Paulo
				Stadium: Estádio Cícero Pompeu de Toledo (Morumbi); Attendance: 32,132; Referee: José Leopoldo Ayeta

Dec 14 Second stage 4	São Paulo	2–2	Ferroviária	São Paulo
	Edu 9'; Milton 63'		Washington 31'; Bispo 89'	Stadium: Estádio Cícero Pompeu de Toledo (Morumbi); Attendance: 2,409; Referee: Márcio Campos Sales

Dec 17 Second stage 5	Ponte Preta	1–1	São Paulo	Campinas
	Lola 31'		Zé Sérgio 50'	Stadium: Estádio Moisés Lucarelli; Attendance: 20,880; Referee: Roberto Nunes Morgado

Jan 28, 1979 Second stage 6	Santos	4–1	São Paulo	São Paulo
	Juari 12', 28'; Aílton Lira 61', 90'		Serginho 47'	Stadium: Estádio Cícero Pompeu de Toledo (Morumbi); Attendance: 74,356; Referee: Roberto Nunes Morgado

Jan 31, 1979 Second stage 7	São Paulo	3–1	São Bento	São Paulo
	Pereyra 33'; Muricy 43'; Serginho 73'		Bife 57'	Stadium: Estádio Cícero Pompeu de Toledo (Morumbi); Attendance: 8,609; Referee: Dulcídio Wanderley Boschilia

Feb 4, 1979 Second stage 8	São Paulo	1–2	Portuguesa	São Paulo
	Serginho 57'		Enéas 80', 83'	Stadium: Estádio Palestra Itália (Parque Antarctica); Attendance: 25,676; Referee: Dulcídio Wanderley Boschilia

Feb 7, 1979 Second stage 9	XV de Jaú	3–1	São Paulo	Jaú
	Pirulito 2', 77'; Paulo Moisés 41'		Muricy 21'	Stadium: Estádio Zezinho Magalhães; Attendance: 16,015; Referee: Sílvio Acácio Silveira

Feb 11, 1979 Second stage 10	Francana	1–0	São Paulo	Franca
	Assis 18'			Stadium: Estádio Municipal Doutor José Lancha Filho; Attendance: 17,110; Referee: Romualdo Arppi Filho

Feb 15, 1979 Second stage 11	São Paulo	3–0	Paulista	São Paulo
	Marião 21'; Milton 29'; Muricy 35'			Stadium: Estádio Cícero Pompeu de Toledo (Morumbi); Attendance: 5,844; Referee: José Favilli Neto

Feb 18, 1979 Second stage 12	América	1–1	São Paulo	São José do Rio Preto
	Marcelo 5'		Milton 40'	Stadium: Estádio Mário Alves Mendonça; Attendance: 11,262; Referee: Romualdo Arppi Filho

Feb 24, 1979 Second stage 13	São Paulo	0–2	Juventus	São Paulo
			Deodoro 39'; Neda 72'	Stadium: Estádio Cícero Pompeu de Toledo (Morumbi); Attendance: 12,962; Referee: Oscar Scolfaro

Mar 8, 1979 Second stage 14	São Paulo	3–0	Guarani	São Paulo
	Viana 9'; Serginho 30', 36'			Stadium: Estádio Cícero Pompeu de Toledo (Morumbi); Attendance: 11,894; Referee: João Leopoldo Aieta

Mar 11, 1979 Second stage 15	XV de Piracicaba	1–0	São Paulo	Piracicaba
	Lima 71'			Stadium: Estádio Barão da Serra Negra; Attendance: 16,989; Referee: Almir Ricci Peixoto

Mar 14, 1979 Second stage 16	São Paulo	2–1	Noroeste	São Paulo
	Serginho 10'; Teodoro 18'		Lela 31'	Stadium: Estádio Cícero Pompeu de Toledo (Morumbi); Attendance: 4,778; Referee: Romualdo Arppi Filho

Mar 17, 1979 Second stage 17	São Paulo	0–3	Comercial	São Paulo
			Hansen 14'; Anselmo 73'; Ciro 83'	Stadium: Estádio Cícero Pompeu de Toledo (Morumbi); Attendance: 10,404; Referee: José de Assis Aragão

Mar 25, 1979 Second stage 18	Portuguesa Santista	0–3	São Paulo	Santos
			Pereyra 9'; Neca 10'; Serginho 91'	Stadium: Estádio Ulrico Mursa; Attendance: 9,365; Referee: Roberto Nunes Morgado

Apr 1, 1979 Second stage 19	Palmeiras	2–0	São Paulo	São Paulo
	Baroninho 69'; Zé Mário 70'			Stadium: Estádio Cícero Pompeu de Toledo (Morumbi); Attendance: 37,295; Referee: José Favilli Neto

Apr 29, 1979 Third round 1	São Paulo	0–0	Juventus	São Paulo
				Stadium: Estádio Municipal Paulo Machado de Carvalho (Pacaembu); Attendance: 18,079; Referee: Roberto Nunes Morgado

May 5, 1979 Third round 2	São Paulo	2–2	Corinthians	São Paulo
	Edu 6', 10'		Sócrates 41'; Wladimir 45'	Stadium: Estádio Cícero Pompeu de Toledo (Morumbi); Attendance: 47,156; Referee: José de Assis Aragão

May 9, 1979 Third round 3	São Paulo	1–0	Palmeiras	São Paulo
	Pereyra 39'			Stadium: Estádio Cícero Pompeu de Toledo (Morumbi); Attendance: 27,614; Referee: João Leopoldo Aieta

May 12, 1979 Third round 4	São Paulo	2–1	Santos	São Paulo
	Serginho 14'; Getúlio 58'		Claudinho 83'	Stadium: Estádio Cícero Pompeu de Toledo (Morumbi); Attendance: 73,803; Referee: Roberto Nunes Morgado

May 19, 1979 Third round 5	São Paulo	1–1	Ponte Preta	São Paulo
	Humberto 49' (o.g.)		Jorge Campos 34'	Stadium: Estádio Cícero Pompeu de Toledo (Morumbi); Attendance: 29,805; Referee: José Favilli Neto

May 26, 1979 Third round 6	São Paulo	4–0	Portuguesa	São Paulo
	Chicão 27'; Edu 53'; Zé Sérgio 79'; Serginho 86'			Stadium: Estádio Cícero Pompeu de Toledo (Morumbi); Attendance: 23,115; Referee: João Leopoldo Aieta

Jun 2, 1979 Third round 7	São Paulo	1–1	Francana	São Paulo
	Serginho 87'		Delém 21'	Stadium: Estádio Cícero Pompeu de Toledo (Morumbi); Referee: Edmundo Absanra

Jun 9, 1979 Third round 8	São Paulo	1–1	Guarani	São Paulo
	Serginho 76'		Renato 26'	Stadium: Estádio Cícero Pompeu de Toledo (Morumbi); Attendance: 34,486; Referee: João Leopoldo Aieta

Jun 13, 1979 Third round 9	São Paulo	2–0	Botafogo	São Paulo
	Serginho 4'; Edu 83'			Stadium: Estádio Municipal Paulo Machado de Carvalho (Pacaembu); Attendance: 49,258; Referee: Roberto Nunes Morgado

Jun 17, 1979 Semifinal	Palmeiras	0–1 (a.e.t.)	São Paulo	São Paulo
			Serginho 103'	Stadium: Estádio Cícero Pompeu de Toledo (Morumbi); Attendance: 112,016; Referee: João Leopoldo Aieta

Jun 20, 1979 Finals 1	São Paulo	1–2	Santos	São Paulo
	Serginho 18'		Juari 26'; Pita 54'	Stadium: Estádio Cícero Pompeu de Toledo (Morumbi); Attendance: 81,788; Referee: João Leopoldo Aieta

Jun 24, 1979 Finals 2	Santos	1–1	São Paulo	São Paulo
	Célio 42'		Zé Sérgio 88'	Stadium: Estádio Cícero Pompeu de Toledo (Morumbi); Attendance: 107,485; Referee: Márcio Campos Sales

Jun 28, 1979 Finals 3	Santos	0–2	São Paulo	São Paulo
			Zé Sérgio 26'; Neca 50'	Stadium: Estádio Cícero Pompeu de Toledo (Morumbi); Attendance: 74,535; Referee: João Leopoldo Aieta

==== Record ====
Final Position	Points	Matches	Wins	Draws	Losses	Goals For	Goals Away	Win%
2nd	63	52	24	15	13	61	48	60%
