= 1979 São Paulo FC season =

São Paulo
1979 season
- Chairman: Antônio Leme Nunes Galvão
- Manager: Rubens Minelli (until July 23); Mário Juliato
- Top goalscorer: League: Serginho (14); All: Serginho (14)

The 1979 season was São Paulo's 50th season since club's existence.

== Statistics ==
=== Scorers ===
Position	Nation	Playing position	Name	Campeonato Paulista	Others	Total
1	(Brazil)	FW	Serginho	14	0	14
2	(Brazil)	MF	Neca	7	2	9
3	(Brazil)	FW	Zé Sérgio	2	2	4
4	(Brazil)	MF	Mug	3	0	3
5	(Brazil)	FW	Edu Bala	2	0	2
=	(Uruguay)	DF	Darío Pereyra	2	0	2
=	(Brazil)	MF	Vilson Tadei	2	0	2
6	(Brazil)	DF	Antenor	1	0	1
=	(Brazil)	MF	Chicão	1	0	1
=	(Brazil)	DF	Getúlio	0	1	1
=	(Brazil)	DF	Estevam	1	0	1
=	(Brazil)	MF	Fernando	1	0	1
=	(Brazil)	FW	Jaiminho	1	0	1
=	(Brazil)	MF	Leivinha	2	0	2
=	(Brazil)	MF	Luís Müller	1	0	1
=	(Brazil)	MF	Muricy	1	0	1
=	(Brazil)	MF	Teodoro	1	0	1
=	(Brazil)	MF	Viana	1	0	1
			Own goals	3	0	3
			Total	46	5	51

== Overall ==
Games played	45 (43 Campeonato Paulista, 2 Friendly match)
Games won	17 (16 Campeonato Paulista)
Games drawn	18 (15 Campeonato Paulista, 2 Friendly match)
Games lost	13 (12 Campeonato Paulista)
Goals scored	51
Goals conceded	42
Goal difference	+9
Best result	3–0 (H) v Portuguesa - Campeonato Paulista - 1979.07.22; 3–0 (H) v Velo Clube - Campeonato Paulista - 1979.09.26
Worst result	0–3 (H) v Santos - Campeonato Paulista - 1979.10.28
Top scorer	Serginho (14)

Source: São Paulo FC

== Friendlies ==
December 13 International	Saudi Arabia	1–1	(Brazil) São Paulo	Riyadh
	15'		Getúlio 12'	Referee: Mahomed Ber Issa

December 15 International	Saudi Arabia	1–1	(Brazil) São Paulo	Jeddah
	Goal		Neca 25'

== Official competitions ==
=== Campeonato Paulista ===
July 1 First stage 1	São Paulo	3–1	Francana	São Paulo
	Neca 18'; Chicão 21'; Zé Mário 57' (o.g.)		Delem 78'	Stadium: Estádio Cícero Pompeu de Toledo (Morumbi); Referee: Emídio Marques de Mesquita

July 4 First stage 2	São Paulo	0–2	Ferroviária	São Paulo
			Parraga 6', 29'	Stadium: Estádio Cícero Pompeu de Toledo (Morumbi); Attendance: 6,224; Referee: Joel Caires

July 8 First stage 3	Internacional	1–0	São Paulo	Limeira
	Camargo 58'			Stadium: Estádio Municipal Major José Levy Sobrinho; Attendance: 19,270; Referee: Roberto Nunes Morgado

July 11 First stage 4	São Paulo	2–0	XV de Jaú	São Paulo
	Zé Sérgio 8'; Muricy 25'			Stadium: Estádio Municipal Paulo Machado de Carvalho (Pacaembu); Attendance: 3,047; Referee: Romualdo Arppi Filho

July 15 First stage 5	XV de Piracicaba	1–2	São Paulo	Piracicaba
	Pitanga 32'		Estevam 75'; Neca 79'	Stadium: Estádio Barão da Serra Negra; Attendance: 10,909; Referee: Ulisses Tavares da Silva

July 18 First stage 6	São Paulo	1–1	Noroeste	São Paulo
	Neca 25'		Ziquita 20'	Stadium: Estádio Cícero Pompeu de Toledo (Morumbi); Attendance: 2,124; Referee: José Pereira Silva

July 22 First stage 7	São Paulo	3–0	Portuguesa	São Paulo
	Zé Sérgio 30'; Neca 65'; Serginho 79'			Stadium: Estádio Municipal Paulo Machado de Carvalho (Pacaembu); Attendance: 16,192; Referee: Ulisses Tavares da Silva

July 25 First stage 8	São Paulo	0–2	Guarani	São Paulo
			Gomes 10'; Careca 65'	Stadium: Estádio Municipal Paulo Machado de Carvalho (Pacaembu); Attendance: 13,770; Referee: Roberto Nunes Morgado

July 29 First stage 9	São Paulo	1–0	Santos	São Paulo
	Vílson Taddei 12'			Stadium: Estádio Municipal Paulo Machado de Carvalho (Pacaembu); Attendance: 24,100; Referee: Oscar Scolfaro

August 1 First stage 10	Marília	0–0	São Paulo	Marília
				Stadium: Estádio Municipal Bento de Abreu Sampaio Vidal; Attendance: 8,228; Referee: José Favilli Neto

August 5 First stage 11	São Paulo	1–1	Palmeiras	São Paulo
	Jaiminho 10'		Carlos Alberto 73'	Stadium: Estádio Cícero Pompeu de Toledo (Morumbi); Attendance: 26,575; Referee: Romualdo Arppi Filho

August 8 First stage 12	São Paulo	2–1	Comercial	São Paulo
	Edu 55'; Vílson Taddei 92'		Jáder 49'	Stadium: Estádio Municipal Paulo Machado de Carvalho (Pacaembu); Attendance: 8,634; Referee: João Leopoldo Aieta

August 12 First stage 13	Ponte Preta	1–1	São Paulo	Campinas
	Odirlei 59'		Serginho 38'	Stadium: Estádio Moisés Lucarelli; Attendance: 17,531; Referee: Emídio Marques de Mesquita

August 15 First stage 14	São Paulo	0–0	São Bento	São Paulo
				Stadium: Estádio Municipal Paulo Machado de Carvalho (Pacaembu); Attendance: 7,348; Referee: José Pereira da Silva

August 19 First stage 15	Botafogo	0–0	São Paulo	Ribeirão Preto
				Stadium: Estádio Santa Cruz; Attendance: 7,824; Referee: Márcio Campos Sales

August 22 First stage 16	Juventus	0–2	São Paulo	São Paulo
			Pereyra 14'; Luís Müller 17'	Stadium: Estádio Municipal Paulo Machado de Carvalho (Pacaembu); Attendance: 7,505; Referee: Roberto Nunes Morgado

August 26 First stage 17	São Paulo	0–2	Corinthians	São Paulo
			Wilsinho 16'; Vaguinho 44'	Stadium: Estádio Cícero Pompeu de Toledo (Morumbi); Attendance: 33,134; Referee: Romualdo Arppi Filho

August 30 First stage 18	São Paulo	0–0	América	São Paulo
				Stadium: Estádio Municipal Paulo Machado de Carvalho (Pacaembu); Attendance: 6,469; Referee: João Leopoldo Aieta

September 2 First stage 19	Velo Clube	1–3	São Paulo	Rio Claro
	Luís Carlos 8'		Fernando 35'; Ademir 41' (o.g.); Serginho 59'	Stadium: Estádio Benito Agnelo Castellano; Attendance: 9,985; Referee: José Luís Guidotti

September 7 First stage 20	Francana	0–0	São Paulo	Franca
				Stadium: Estádio Municipal Doutor José Lancha Filho; Attendance: 11,623; Referee: Hélio Cosso

September 9 First stage 21	Comercial	1–1	São Paulo	Ribeirão Preto
	Pedro Omar 69'		Serginho 17'	Stadium: Estádio Doutor Francisco de Palma Travassos; Attendance: 9,803; Referee: Romualdo Arppi Filho

September 12 First stage 22	São Paulo	2–1	Maríla	São Paulo
	Pereyra 7'; Neca 43'		Pedro Rodrigues 46'	Stadium: Estádio Municipal Paulo Machado de Carvalho (Pacaembu); Attendance: 3,979; Referee: Ulisses Tavares da Silva

September 16 First stage 23	Corinthians	1–1	São Paulo	São Paulo
	Basílio 55'		Serginho 67'	Stadium: Estádio Cícero Pompeu de Toledo (Morumbi); Attendance: 53,980; Referee: Romualdo Arppi Filho

September 20 First stage 24	América	1–0	São Paulo	São José do Rio Preto
	Arlem 71'			Stadium: Estádio Mário Alves de Mendonça; Attendance: 12,582; Referee: Nilo Mendes

September 23 First stage 25	Ferroviária	1–1	São Paulo	Araraquara
	Toninho 90'		Neca 65'	Stadium: Estádio Doutor Adhemar de Barros (Fonte Luminosa); Attendance: 8,020; Referee: João Leopoldo Aieta

September 26 First stage 26	São Paulo	3–0	Velo Clube	São Paulo
	Mug 19'; Serginho 55'; Teodoro 66'			Stadium: Estádio Municipal Paulo Machado de Carvalho (Pacaembu); Attendance: 4,996; Referee: Oscar Scolfaro

September 30 First stage 27	Noroeste	1–0	São Paulo	Bauru
	Ednaldo 71'			Stadium: Estádio Doutor Alfredo de Castilho; Attendance: 9,710; Referee: José Luís Guidotti

October 2 First stage 28	São Paulo	2–1	Internacional	São Paulo
	Viana 8'; Serginho 53'		Guinga 74'	Stadium: Estádio Cícero Pompeu de Toledo (Morumbi); Attendance: 1,657; Referee: Ulisses Tavares da Silva

October 4 First stage 29	São Paulo	0–1	XV de Piracicaba	São Paulo
			Lima 90'	Stadium: Estádio Cícero Pompeu de Toledo (Morumbi); Attendance: 1,659; Referee: Roberto Nunes Morgado

October 7 First stage 30	São Paulo	2–0	Palmeiras	São Paulo
	Pires 47' (o.g.); Serginho 57'			Stadium: Estádio Cícero Pompeu de Toledo (Morumbi); Attendance: 32,889; Referee: Márcio Campos Sales

October 10 First stage 31	São Paulo	1–1	Botafogo	São Paulo
	Serginho 65'		Miro 75'	Stadium: Estádio Municipal Paulo Machado de Carvalho (Pacaembu); Attendance: 4,381; Referee: Almir Peixoto

October 14 First stage 32	XV de Jaú	2–0	São Paulo	Jaú
	Frasão 48'; Marcão 89'			Stadium: Estádio Municipal José Magalhães de Almeida Prado; Attendance: 7,741; Referee: Hélio Cosso

October 17 First stage 33	Guarani	0–1	São Paulo	Campinas
			Neca	Stadium: Estádio Brinco de Ouro da Princesa; Attendance: 10,250; Referee: José Pereira da Silva

October 20 First stage 34	São Bento	2–1	São Paulo	Sorocaba
	Coca 13'; Drailton 76'		Edu 28'	Stadium: Estádio Municipal Wálter Ribeiro; Attendance: 15,383; Referee: João Leopoldo Aieta

October 24 First stage 35	São Paulo	1–0	Juventus	São Paulo
	Mug 82'			Stadium: Estádio Municipal Paulo Machado de Carvalho (Pacaembu); Attendance: 3,749; Referee: Roberto Nunes Morgado

October 28 First stage 36	São Paulo	0–3	Santos	São Paulo
			Juari 6', 58'; Rubens Feijão 39'	Stadium: Estádio Cícero Pompeu de Toledo (Morumbi); Attendance: 22,607; Referee: João Leopoldo Aieta

October 31 First stage 37	São Paulo	4–2	Portuguesa	São Paulo
	Mug 36'; Serginho 44'; Leivinha 62', 68'		Caio 12'; Enéas 86'	Stadium: Estádio Cícero Pompeu de Toledo (Morumbi); Attendance: 3,244; Referee: José Silva

November 3 First stage 38	São Paulo	1–1	Ponte Preta	São Paulo
	Antenor 40'		Edson 2'	Stadium: Estádio Cícero Pompeu de Toledo (Morumbi); Attendance: 3,695; Referee: Márcio Sales

November 8 Second stage 1	Botafogo	0–0	São Paulo	Ribeirão Preto
				Stadium: Estádio Santa Cruz; Attendance: 4,272; Referee: Oscar Scolfaro

November 11 Second stage 2	São Paulo	1–1	Ferroviária	São Paulo
	Serginho 49'		Douglas 17'	Stadium: Estádio Palestra Itália (Parque Antarctica); Attendance: 4,674; Referee: Hélio Cosso

November 15 Second stage 3	São Paulo	1–0	América	São Paulo
	Serginho 62'			Stadium: Estádio Cícero Pompeu de Toledo (Morumbi); Referee: José de Assis Aragão

November 18 Second stage 4	Ponte Preta	2–1	São Paulo	Campinas
	Osvaldo 8'; Dicá 81'		Serginho 34'	Stadium: Estádio Moisés Lucarelli; Attendance: 12,002; Referee: João Leopoldo Aieta

November 21 Second stage 5	São Paulo	1–2	Corinthians	São Paulo
	Serginho 35'		Wladimir 30'; Sócrates 90'	Stadium: Estádio Cícero Pompeu de Toledo (Morumbi); Attendance: 38,960; Referee: José Luís Guidotti

==== Record ====
Final Position	Points	Matches	Wins	Draws	Losses	Goals For	Goals Away	Win%
8th	47	43	16	15	12	46	38	55%
