= 1977 Campeonato Brasileiro Série A =

Campeonato Brasileiro Série A
- Season: 1977
- Champions: São Paulo (1st title)
- Copa Libertadores de América: São Paulo; Atlético Mineiro
- Matches: 485
- Goals: 1,204 (2.48 per match)
- Top goalscorer: Reinaldo (Atlético Mineiro) - 28 goals
- Biggest home win: Bahia 7-0 Vitória-ES (November 2, 1977)
- Biggest away win: Fluminense de Feira 0-6 Flamengo (October 26, 1977)
- Highest scoring: CRB 6-4 Sport (November 20, 1977)
- Longest winning run: Atlético Mineiro (8 matches)
- Longest unbeaten run: Atlético Mineiro (21 matches)
- Longest losing run: Sergipe (7 matches)
- Average attendance: 16,404

The 1977 Campeonato Brasileiro Série A, (officially the III Copa Brasil) was the 22nd edition of the Campeonato Brasileiro Série A.

== Overview ==
It was performed by 62 teams, and São Paulo won the championship. This championship is notable for producing a rare instance of an unbeaten runner-up. Atlético Mineiro had won all but three of its matches, which were drawn, but was to play a single final match against São Paulo, without any advantage. A controversial scoreless draw, marred by violent play mostly (but not exclusively) on the part of São Paulo, had to be solved in a penalty shootout.

== First phase ==
=== Group A ===
Pos	Team	Pld	W	D	L	GF	GA	GD	BP	Pts	Qualification
1	Internacional	9	6	2	1	15	5	+10	4	18	Qualified to Second phase
2	Grêmio	9	5	2	2	21	8	+13	5	17	Qualified to Second phase
3	Grêmio Maringá	9	5	1	3	11	9	+2	2	13	Qualified to Second phase
4	Operário-MS	9	4	3	2	13	9	+4	2	13	Qualified to Second phase
5	Joinville	9	4	2	3	11	14	−3	1	11	Qualified to Second phase
6	Avaí	9	3	1	5	8	8	0	2	9	Qualified to Group M on Second phase
7	Juventude	9	3	2	4	6	8	−2	0	8	Qualified to Group M on Second phase
8	Coritiba	9	3	2	4	9	15	−6	0	8	Qualified to Group M on Second phase
9	Caxias	9	1	5	3	7	10	−3	0	7	Qualified to Group M on Second phase
10	Dom Bosco	9	0	2	7	11	26	−15	0	2	Qualified to Group M on Second phase

=== Group B ===
Pos	Team	Pld	W	D	L	GF	GA	GD	BP	Pts	Qualification
1	Palmeiras	9	7	2	0	16	5	+11	4	20	Qualified to Second phase
2	São Paulo	9	6	2	1	14	3	+11	4	18	Qualified to Second phase
3	Santa Cruz	9	4	3	2	16	6	+10	2	13	Qualified to Second phase
4	XV de Piracicaba	9	2	7	0	6	3	+3	1	12	Qualified to Second phase
5	CSA	9	3	3	3	8	7	+1	2	11	Qualified to Second phase
6	CRB	9	3	1	5	12	19	−7	2	9	Qualified to Group N on Second phase
7	Sport	9	1	4	4	11	16	−5	1	7	Qualified to Group N on Second phase
8	Náutico	9	2	2	5	7	11	−4	0	6	Qualified to Group N on Second phase
9	Treze	9	1	4	4	6	17	−11	0	6	Qualified to Group N on Second phase
10	Botafogo-PB	9	1	2	6	3	12	−9	0	4	Qualified to Group N on Second phase

=== Group C ===
Pos	Team	Pld	W	D	L	GF	GA	GD	BP	Pts	Qualification
1	Ponte Preta	10	7	2	1	18	5	+13	4	20	Qualified to Second phase
2	Portuguesa	10	6	2	2	12	5	+7	3	17	Qualified to Second phase
3	Corinthians	10	5	3	2	13	5	+8	3	16	Qualified to Second phase
4	Guarani	10	5	2	3	12	6	+6	3	15	Qualified to Second phase
5	ABC	10	4	3	3	11	8	+3	2	13	Qualified to Second phase
6	Ceará	10	4	1	5	10	11	−1	1	10	Qualified to Group O on Second phase
7	América-RN	10	3	3	4	10	15	−5	1	10	Qualified to Group O on Second phase
8	River	10	2	4	4	12	17	−5	1	9	Qualified to Group O on Second phase
9	Sampaio Corrêa	10	2	4	4	6	11	−5	1	9	Qualified to Group O on Second phase
10	Fortaleza	10	2	2	6	8	15	−7	0	6	Qualified to Group O on Second phase
11	Flamengo-PI	10	1	2	7	6	20	−14	0	4	Qualified to Group O on Second phase

=== Group D ===
Pos	Team	Pld	W	D	L	GF	GA	GD	BP	Pts	Qualification
1	Botafogo	9	6	3	0	15	3	+12	4	19	Qualified to Second phase
2	Vasco da Gama	9	6	2	1	14	3	+11	4	18	Qualified to Second phase
3	Goytacaz	9	4	4	1	14	8	+6	2	14	Qualified to Second phase
4	Brasília	9	5	1	3	8	8	0	0	11	Qualified to Second phase
5	Americano	9	3	3	3	8	13	−5	1	10	Qualified to Second phase
6	Goiás	9	2	5	2	9	10	−1	1	10	Qualified to Group P on Second phase
7	Atlético-PR	9	2	3	4	10	12	−2	2	9	Qualified to Group P on Second phase
8	Londrina	9	2	3	4	12	16	−4	1	8	Qualified to Group P on Second phase
9	Goiânia	9	1	3	5	9	17	−8	0	5	Qualified to Group P on Second phase
10	Vila Nova	9	0	3	6	5	14	−9	0	3	Qualified to Group P on Second phase

=== Group E ===
Pos	Team	Pld	W	D	L	GF	GA	GD	BP	Pts	Qualification
1	Flamengo	10	6	3	1	25	6	+19	6	21	Qualified to Second phase
2	Fluminense	10	7	1	2	20	6	+14	2	17	Qualified to Second phase
3	Confiança	10	6	2	2	15	11	+4	2	16	Qualified to Second phase
4	Bahia	10	5	3	2	17	5	+12	3	16	Qualified to Second phase
5	América-RJ	10	5	4	1	12	7	+5	1	15	Qualified to Second phase
6	Desportiva	10	5	1	4	12	15	−3	2	13	Qualified to Group Q on Second phase
7	Vitória-ES	10	3	2	5	9	25	−16	1	9	Qualified to Group Q on Second phase
8	Volta Redonda	10	2	4	4	10	11	−1	1	9	Qualified to Group Q on Second phase
9	Vitória	10	1	3	6	6	15	−9	1	6	Qualified to Group Q on Second phase
10	Sergipe	10	2	0	8	7	19	−12	0	4	Qualified to Group Q on Second phase
11	Fluminense de Feira	10	0	3	7	4	17	−13	0	3	Qualified to Group Q on Second phase

=== Group F ===
Pos	Team	Pld	W	D	L	GF	GA	GD	BP	Pts	Qualification
1	Atlético Mineiro	9	8	1	0	26	8	+18	8	25	Qualified to Second phase
2	Cruzeiro	9	4	3	2	15	9	+6	4	15	Qualified to Second phase
3	Botafogo-SP	9	6	0	3	19	11	+8	2	14	Qualified to Second phase
4	Remo	9	4	2	3	14	10	+4	3	13	Qualified to Second phase
5	Santos	9	4	1	4	13	12	+1	4	13	Qualified to Second phase
6	Uberaba	9	3	3	3	10	8	+2	2	11	Qualified to Group R on Second phase
7	Paysandu	9	3	2	4	12	19	−7	1	9	Qualified to Group R on Second phase
8	Nacional-AM	9	3	1	5	7	16	−9	1	8	Qualified to Group R on Second phase
9	América-MG	9	1	2	6	8	15	−7	1	5	Qualified to Group R on Second phase
10	Fast	9	1	1	7	10	26	−16	1	4	Qualified to Group R on Second phase

== Second phase ==
=== Group G ===
Pos	Team	Pld	W	D	L	GF	GA	GD	BP	Pts	Qualification
1	Corinthians	4	3	1	0	8	0	+8	2	9	Qualified to Third phase
2	São Paulo	4	2	1	1	9	3	+6	2	7	Qualified to Third phase
3	América-RJ	4	1	3	0	3	2	+1	0	5	Qualified to Third phase
4	Internacional	4	1	1	2	7	5	+2	1	4	
5	Brasília	4	0	0	4	2	19	−17	0	0	

=== Group H ===
Pos	Team	Pld	W	D	L	GF	GA	GD	BP	Pts	Qualification
1	Palmeiras	4	3	1	0	7	3	+4	1	8	Qualified to Third phase
2	Bahia	4	3	0	1	5	1	+4	2	8	Qualified to Third phase
3	Santos	4	1	2	1	3	3	0	0	4	Qualified to Third phase
4	Goytacaz	4	1	1	2	2	5	−3	0	3	
5	Portuguesa	4	0	0	4	2	7	−5	0	0	

=== Group I ===
Pos	Team	Pld	W	D	L	GF	GA	GD	BP	Pts	Qualification
1	Ponte Preta	4	2	1	1	5	1	+4	2	7	Qualified to Third phase
2	Vasco da Gama	4	2	2	0	3	1	+2	0	6	Qualified to Third phase
3	Remo	4	2	0	2	3	3	0	0	4	Qualified to Third phase
4	Joinville	4	1	1	2	4	4	0	1	4	
5	Confiança	4	1	0	3	2	8	−6	0	2	

=== Group J ===
Pos	Team	Pld	W	D	L	GF	GA	GD	BP	Pts	Qualification
1	Botafogo	4	2	2	0	7	4	+3	1	7	Qualified to Third phase
2	Operário-MS	4	2	2	0	5	2	+3	1	7	Qualified to Third phase
3	Botafogo-SP	4	0	4	0	4	4	0	0	4	Qualified to Third phase
4	Fluminense	4	1	1	2	3	4	−1	0	3	
5	CSA	4	0	1	3	4	9	−5	0	1	

=== Group K ===
Pos	Team	Pld	W	D	L	GF	GA	GD	BP	Pts	Qualification
1	Flamengo	4	3	0	1	5	2	+3	1	7	Qualified to Third phase
2	XV de Piracicaba	4	2	0	2	4	3	+1	1	5	Qualified to Third phase
3	Cruzeiro	4	1	2	1	5	5	0	1	5	Qualified to Third phase
4	Grêmio Maringá	4	1	1	2	3	4	−1	1	4	
5	ABC	4	1	1	2	3	6	−3	0	3	

=== Group L ===
Pos	Team	Pld	W	D	L	GF	GA	GD	BP	Pts	Qualification
1	Atlético Mineiro	4	4	0	0	9	2	+7	3	11	Qualified to Third phase
2	Santa Cruz	4	3	0	1	8	5	+3	1	7	Qualified to Third phase
3	Grêmio	4	1	1	2	5	6	−1	1	4	Qualified to Third phase
4	Guarani	4	1	0	3	6	4	+2	1	3	
5	Americano	4	0	0	4	0	11	−11	0	0	

=== Group M ===
Pos	Team	Pld	W	D	L	GF	GA	GD	BP	Pts	Qualification
1	Caxias	4	2	2	0	9	4	+5	1	7	Qualified to Third phase
2	Juventude	4	2	1	1	6	3	+3	1	6	
3	Avaí	4	2	0	2	6	9	−3	0	4	
4	Coritiba	4	1	0	3	7	8	−1	1	3	
5	Dom Bosco	4	1	1	2	2	6	−4	0	3	

=== Group N ===
Pos	Team	Pld	W	D	L	GF	GA	GD	BP	Pts	Qualification
1	Sport	4	4	0	0	9	1	+8	2	10	Qualified to Third phase
2	Náutico	4	2	0	2	8	5	+3	1	5	
3	CRB	4	1	1	2	4	3	+1	1	4	
4	Botafogo-PB	4	1	0	3	6	10	−4	1	3	
5	Treze	4	1	1	2	3	11	−8	0	3	

=== Group O ===
Pos	Team	Pld	W	D	L	GF	GA	GD	BP	Pts	Qualification
1	América-RN	5	3	2	0	11	2	+9	3	11	Qualified to Third phase
2	Ceará	5	2	2	1	6	4	+2	1	7	
3	River	5	2	1	2	6	12	−6	0	5	
4	Sampaio Corrêa	5	1	2	2	9	9	0	1	5	
5	Fortaleza	5	1	1	3	4	6	−2	1	4	
6	Flamengo-PI	5	0	4	1	2	5	−3	0	4	

=== Group P ===
Pos	Team	Pld	W	D	L	GF	GA	GD	BP	Pts	Qualification
1	Londrina	4	3	0	1	9	5	+4	1	7	Qualified to Third phase
2	Goiás	4	2	1	1	10	7	+3	1	6	
3	Atlético-PR	4	1	2	1	9	9	0	0	4	
4	Vila Nova	4	1	1	2	6	6	0	1	4	
5	Goiânia	4	1	0	3	5	12	−7	0	2	

=== Group Q ===
Pos	Team	Pld	W	D	L	GF	GA	GD	BP	Pts	Qualification
1	Vitória	5	3	1	1	8	5	+3	2	9	Disqualified (Note: In the match between Desportiva and Fluminense de Feira, Fluminense de Feira had 5 players sent off while the match was still 0-0. It was eventually discovered that Fluminense de Feira had been bribed by the Bahian Football Federation to do this in order to not let Desportiva qualify to the third phase instead of Vitória, which would happen if Desportiva won by two goals or more. CBD ordered an extra match between Desportiva and Vitória-BA because of the bribery event in the match between Desportiva and Fluminense-BA. Vitória did not show to play the extra match, thus Desportiva was awarded the berth.)
2	Desportiva	5	2	2	1	6	5	+1	1	7	Qualified to Third phase
3	Volta Redonda	5	2	2	1	7	5	+2	1	7	
4	Vitória-ES	5	2	1	2	4	5	−1	0	5	
5	Fluminense de Feira	5	1	2	2	2	4	−2	0	4	
6	Sergipe	5	0	2	3	5	8	−3	0	2	

=== Group R ===
Pos	Team	Pld	W	D	L	GF	GA	GD	BP	Pts	Qualification
1	Fast	4	3	0	1	6	3	+3	1	7	Qualified to Third phase
2	América-MG	4	3	0	1	5	3	+2	1	7	
3	Uberaba	4	2	1	1	5	3	+2	1	6	
4	Paysandu	4	0	2	2	5	8	−3	0	2	
5	Nacional-AM	4	0	1	3	2	6	−4	0	1	

== Third phase ==
=== Group 1 ===
Pos	Team	Pld	W	D	L	GF	GA	GD	BP	Pts
1	(Paraná (state)) Londrina	5	5	0	0	8	1	+7	2	12
2	(Rio de Janeiro (state)) Vasco da Gama	5	2	2	1	6	3	+3	1	7
3	(São Paulo (state)) Corinthians	5	2	2	1	3	2	+1	0	6
4	(São Paulo (state)) Santos	5	0	3	2	5	7	−2	0	3
5	(Rio de Janeiro (state)) Flamengo	5	0	3	2	1	3	−2	0	3
6	(Rio Grande do Sul) Caxias	5	0	2	3	5	12	−7	0	2

=== Group 2 ===
Pos	Team	Pld	W	D	L	GF	GA	GD	BP	Pts
1	(Minas Gerais) Atlético Mineiro	5	4	1	0	14	2	+12	2	11
2	(Rio de Janeiro (state)) Botafogo	5	3	2	0	8	1	+7	3	11
3	Bahia	5	1	3	1	4	6	−2	1	6
4	(Minas Gerais) Cruzeiro	5	1	2	2	10	12	−2	0	4
5	(Rio Grande do Norte) América-RN	5	0	3	2	2	10	−8	0	3
6	(Amazonas (Brazilian state)) Fast	5	0	1	4	6	12	−6	0	1

=== Group 3 ===
Pos	Team	Pld	W	D	L	GF	GA	GD	BP	Pts
1	(São Paulo (state)) São Paulo	5	4	0	1	14	8	+6	3	11
2	(Rio Grande do Sul) Grêmio	5	3	1	1	5	4	+1	0	7
3	(São Paulo (state)) Botafogo-SP	5	2	2	1	5	6	−1	0	6
4	(São Paulo (state)) Ponte Preta	5	2	0	3	6	6	0	1	5
5	(Pernambuco) Sport	5	2	0	3	6	7	−1	0	4
6	(São Paulo (state)) XV de Piracicaba	5	0	1	4	2	7	−5	0	1

=== Group 4 ===
Pos	Team	Pld	W	D	L	GF	GA	GD	BP	Pts
1	(Mato Grosso do Sul) Operário-MS	5	3	1	1	9	2	+7	3	10
2	(Pernambuco) Santa Cruz	5	3	2	0	9	4	+5	2	10
3	(Pará) Remo	5	2	2	1	9	5	+4	2	8
4	(São Paulo (state)) Palmeiras	5	2	0	3	10	10	0	2	6
5	(Rio de Janeiro (state)) América-RJ	5	0	3	2	4	10	−6	0	3
6	(Espírito Santo) Desportiva	5	0	2	3	3	13	−10	0	2

== Semifinals ==
Team 1	Agg.	Team 2	1st leg	2nd leg
Atlético Mineiro	6–4	Londrina	4-2	2-2
São Paulo	3–1	Operário-MS	3-0	0-1

=== First leg ===
26 February 1978

Atlético Mineiro (Minas Gerais)	4 – 2	(Paraná (state)) Londrina
Ziza 18'; Reinaldo 31', 65', 90+3'		Brandão 57'; Carlos Alberto Garcia 73'

Mineirão, Belo Horizonte (MG)
Attendance: 96,404
Referee: (Rio de Janeiro (state)) Aírton Vieira de Morais

26 February 1978

São Paulo (São Paulo (state))	3 – 0	(Mato Grosso do Sul) Operário-MS
Serginho Chulapa 32', 90+3'; Neca 87'

Morumbi, São Paulo (SP)
Attendance: 103,092
Referee: (Rio de Janeiro (state)) José Roberto Wright

=== Second leg ===
1 March 1978

Londrina (Paraná (state))	2 – 2	(Minas Gerais) Atlético Mineiro
Brandão 43'; Ademar 46'		Caio Cambalhota 17'; Serginho 34'

Estádio do Café, Londrina (PR)
Attendance: 38,440
Referee: (Rio de Janeiro (state)) Valquir Pimentel

1 March 1978

Operário-MS (Mato Grosso do Sul)	1 – 0	(São Paulo (state)) São Paulo
Tadeu Santos 79'

Morenão, Campo Grande (MS)
Attendance: 20,161
Referee: (Rio de Janeiro (state)) Luís Carlos Félix

== Final ==
5 March 1978

Atlético Mineiro (Minas Gerais)	0 – 0	(São Paulo (state)) São Paulo
Penalties
Toninho Cerezo (penalty missed); Ziza (penalty scored); Alves (penalty scored); Joãozinho Paulista (penalty missed); Márcio Gugu (penalty missed)	2–3	(penalty missed) Getúlio; (penalty missed) Chicão; (penalty scored) Peres; (penalty scored) Antenor; (penalty scored) Bezerra

Mineirão, Belo Horizonte (MG)
Attendance: 102,974
Referee: (Rio de Janeiro (state)) Arnaldo Cézar Coelho

== Final standings ==
Pos	Team	Pld	W	D	L	GF	GA	GD	BP	Pts
1	São Paulo	21	13	4	4	40	15	+25	9	39
2	Atlético Mineiro	21	17	4	0	55	16	+39	11	49
3	Operário-MS	20	10	6	4	28	16	+12	6	32
4	Londrina	20	10	4	6	33	28	+5	4	28
5	Botafogo	18	11	7	0	30	8	+22	8	37
6	Palmeiras	18	12	3	3	33	18	+15	7	34
7	Ponte Preta	19	11	3	5	29	12	+17	7	32
8	Corinthians	19	10	6	3	24	7	+17	5	31
9	Flamengo	19	9	6	4	31	11	+20	7	31
10	Santa Cruz	18	10	5	3	33	15	+18	5	30
11	Bahia	19	9	6	4	26	12	+14	6	30
12	Vasco da Gama	18	8	8	2	26	10	+16	5	29
13	Grêmio	18	9	4	5	31	18	+13	6	28
14	Remo	18	8	4	6	26	18	+8	5	25
15	Botafogo-SP	18	8	6	4	28	21	+7	2	24
16	Cruzeiro	18	6	7	5	30	27	+3	5	24
17	América-RN	20	6	8	6	23	27	−4	4	24
18	América-RJ	19	6	10	3	19	19	0	1	23
19	Desportiva Capixaba	20	7	5	8	21	33	−12	3	22
20	Sport	18	7	4	7	26	24	+2	3	21
21	Santos	18	5	6	7	21	22	−1	4	20
22	XV de Piracicaba	18	4	8	6	12	13	−1	2	18
23	Caxias	18	3	9	6	21	26	−5	1	16
24	Fast	18	4	2	12	22	41	−19	2	12
25	Internacional	13	7	3	3	22	10	+12	5	22
26	Fluminense	14	8	2	4	23	10	+13	2	20
27	Confiança	14	7	2	5	17	19	−2	2	18
28	Guarani	14	6	2	6	18	10	+8	4	18
29	Portuguesa	14	6	2	6	14	12	+2	3	17
30	Maringá	13	6	2	5	14	13	+1	3	17
31	Goytacaz	13	5	5	3	16	13	+3	2	17
32	ABC	14	5	4	5	14	14	0	2	16
33	Joinville	13	5	3	5	15	18	−3	2	15
34	CSA	13	3	4	6	12	16	−4	2	12
35	Brasília	13	5	1	7	10	27	−17	0	11
36	Americano	13	3	4	6	8	24	−16	1	11
37	Ceará	15	6	3	6	16	15	+1	2	17
38	Uberaba	13	5	4	4	15	11	+4	3	17
39	Goiás	13	4	6	3	19	17	+2	2	16
40	Volta Redonda	15	4	6	5	17	16	+1	2	16
41	Vitória	15	4	4	7	14	20	−6	3	15
42	Juventude	13	5	3	5	12	11	+1	1	14
43	Vitória-ES	15	5	3	7	13	30	−17	1	14
44	River	15	4	5	6	18	29	−11	1	14
45	Sampaio Corrêa	15	3	6	6	15	20	−5	2	14
46	Avaí	13	5	1	7	14	17	−3	2	13
47	CRB	13	4	2	7	16	22	−6	3	13
48	Atlético Paranaense	13	3	5	5	19	21	−2	2	13
49	América Mineiro	13	4	2	7	13	18	−5	2	12
50	Coritiba	13	4	2	7	16	23	−7	1	11
51	Náutico	13	4	2	7	15	16	−1	1	11
52	Paysandu	13	3	4	6	17	27	−10	1	11
53	Fortaleza	15	3	3	9	12	21	−9	1	10
54	Nacional	13	3	2	8	9	22	−13	1	9
55	Treze	13	2	5	6	9	28	−19	0	9
56	Flamengo-PI	15	1	6	8	8	25	−17	0	8
57	Botafogo-PB	13	2	2	9	9	22	−13	1	7
58	Goiânia	13	2	3	8	14	29	−15	0	7
59	Vila Nova	13	1	4	8	11	20	−9	1	7
60	Fluminense-BA	15	1	5	9	6	21	−15	0	7
61	Sergipe	15	2	2	11	12	27	−15	0	6
62	Dom Bosco-MT	13	1	3	9	13	32	−19	0	5

Source: rsssf.com
