= Valter Peres =

Brazilian footballer

Peres
Personal information
- Full name: Valter Peres
- Date of birth: 10 December 1954 (age 71)
- Place of birth: Osasco, Brazil
- Position: Defensive midfielder

Youth career
- –1975: São Paulo

Senior career*
Years	Team	Apps	(Gls)
1975–1979	São Paulo	70	(0)
1977	→ Botafogo-PB (loan)		
1979–1980	Bahia		
1980	→ Marília (loan)		
1981	Colorado-PR		
1981	São Bento		
1982	Confiança		
1982	Ferroviário		
1983	Taguatinga		
1984	Bahia		
- * Club domestic league appearances and goals as of 27 December 2023

Valter Peres (born 10 December 1954), is a Brazilian former professional footballer who played as a defensive midfielder.

== Career ==
Formed in São Paulo FC youth categories, Peres competed for a position in the club's midfield with Chicão and Teodoro during the 1970s. He was Brazilian champion in 1977, converting one of the penalties in the final against Atlético Mineiro.

== Honours ==
São Paulo

- Campeonato Brasileiro: 1977
