= Geraldão (disambiguation) =

Geraldão may refer to:

- Geraldão, character created by Brazilian cartoonist Glauco Villas Boas
- Geraldão (footballer, born 1949), Geraldo da Silva, Brazilian football forward
- Geraldão (footballer, born 1963), Geraldo Dutra Pereira, Brazilian football defender
