= Valtinho (footballer, born 1956) =

Brazilian footballer

Personal information
- Full name: Valter Lucca Lateri
- Date of birth: 24 January 1956 (age 70)
- Place of birth: São Paulo, Brazil
- Positions: Attacking midfielder; forward

Youth career
- 1970–1976: São Paulo

Senior career*
Years	Team	Apps	(Gls)
1976–1981	São Paulo	79	(7)
1979	→ Coritiba (loan)		
1980	→ Colorado-PR (loan)		
1980–1981	→ Internacional (loan)		
1982	São Bento		
1982–1983	XV de Jaú		

Managerial career
- Joseense
- Guaçuano
- * Club domestic league appearances and goals as of 30 December 2023

Valter Lucca Lateri (born 24 January 1956), better known as Valtinho, is a Brazilian former professional footballer and manager who played as an attacking midfielder and forward.

== Career ==
Trained in the youth sectors of São Paulo, Valtinho participated in winning the Brazilian championship in 1977 and the state championship in 1981. He also had successful spells in Coritiba and Internacional. After retiring, he trained some teams in the countryside of São Paulo, such as Joseense and Guaçuano. He became the owner of a truck transport company.

== Honours ==
São Paulo

- Campeonato Brasileiro: 1977
- Campeonato Paulista: 1981

Coritiba

- Campeonato Paranaense: 1979

Internacional

- Campeonato Gaúcho: 1981
