= Mug (footballer) =

Brazilian footballer

Personal information
- Full name: Édson Cuicci
- Date of birth: 8 August 1955
- Place of birth: São Paulo, Brazil
- Date of death: 1 August 2017 (aged 61)
- Place of death: São Paulo, Brazil
- Position: Left winger

Senior career*
Years	Team	Apps	(Gls)
1975	Olímpia		
1976	Francana		
1977	Rio Verde-GO		
1978	Coritiba		
1978	Goiânia		
1979	São Paulo	22	(3)
1980	Criciúma		
1980	Colorado-PR		
1981	Criciúma		
1981–1983	CSA		
1983	Paulista		
1983	Esportivo		
- * Club domestic league appearances and goals as of 30 September 2023

Édson Cuicci (8 August 1955 – 1 August 2017), better known as Mug, was a Brazilian professional footballer, who played as a left winger.

== Career ==
Left winger for several clubs in Brazil, Mug was champion of Campeonato Paranaense twice, once with Coritiba in 1978 and another with Colorado in 1980.

== Honours ==
Coritiba

- Campeonato Paranaense: 1978

Colorado

- Campeonato Paranaense: 1980

CSA

- Campeonato Alagoano: 1981, 1982

== Death ==
Mug was found dead in his home on August 1, 2017.
