= Armando Dávalos =

Brazilian footballer

Personal information
- Full name: Armando Renê Dávalos Brites
- Date of birth: 23 January 1957 (age 69)
- Place of birth: Ponta Porã, Brazil
- Position: Midfielder

Youth career
- Comercial (Ponta Porã)

Senior career*
Years	Team	Apps	(Gls)
1972–1973	Comercial (Ponta Porã)		
1974	2 de Mayo		
1975	Esportiva Guaxupé		
1976	Francana		
1977	Rio Verde-GO		
1977	XV de Piracicaba		
1978–1979	São Paulo	32	(4)
1979	Náutico		
1980	Botafogo-SP		
1980	Fernandópolis		
1981	Amparo		
1982–1983	Penapolense		
1984–1985	Gaúcho		
1985	Rio-Grandense		
1986	Comercial de Registro		

Managerial career
- 2006: 2 de Mayo
- 2017: 2 de Mayo
- 2022: 2 de Mayo
- * Club domestic league appearances and goals as of 16 October 2023

Armando Renê Dávalos Brites (born 23 January 1957), better known as Armando Dávalos or simply Armando, is a Brazilian former professional footballer and manager who played as a midfielder.

== Career ==
Player born in the city of Ponta Porã, started playing for the local Comercial. He was taken to 2 de Mayo in Paraguay by his brother, and after standing out in the regional, he ended up getting a chance at Esportiva Guaxupé in Minas Gerais. He played for a few more clubs until arriving at São Paulo FC, where he made 32 appearances and scored 4 goals.

== Managerial career ==
Armando was the manager of Sportivo 2 de Mayo in the winning campaign the Paraguayan Primera División B Nacional in 2017. He also coached the club in 2006 and in 2022.
