= Müller (footballer, born 1957) =

Brazilian footballer

Personal information
- Full name: José Edmur Lucas Corrêa
- Date of birth: 4 May 1957 (age 69)
- Place of birth: Aquidauana, Brazil
- Position: Forward

Youth career
- Operário-MS

Senior career*
Years	Team	Apps	(Gls)
1976	Botafogo-PB		
1976–1978	São Paulo	65	(9)
1979–1986	Tecos UAG		
1986–1988	Tigres UANL		
1989	Cabofriense		
1989	Bangu		
1989–1990	Tampico Madero		
- * Club domestic league appearances and goals as of 2 September 2023

José Edmur Lucas Corrêa (born 4 May 1957), better known as Edmur Lucas or by the nickname Müller, is a Brazilian former professional footballer who played as a forward.

== Career ==
Müller started his career at Operário de Campo Grande. In Brazil, he was successful by being Brazilian champion with São Paulo FC. After this, headed to Mexico, where he spent most of his career, playing for UAG.

== Personal life ==
Edmur is the elder brother of footballers Müller (who received the same nickname because of Edmur), Leba and Cocada.

== Honours ==
São Paulo

- Campeonato Brasileiro: 1977
