= Antenor (footballer, born 1952) =

Brazilian footballer

Personal information
- Full name: Antenor Machado Filho
- Date of birth: 26 May 1952 (age 74)
- Place of birth: Belo Horizonte, Brazil
- Position: Full-back

Youth career
- –1970: Atlético Mineiro

Senior career*
Years	Team	Apps	(Gls)
1970–1973	Atlético Mineiro	45	(1)
1972	→ América Mineiro (loan)		
1974–1977	Nacional-AM		
1977–1980	São Paulo	104	(3)
1979	→ Sport Recife (loan)		
1981	Inter de Limeira		
1982–1984	Sport Recife		
1984–1985	Atlético Goianiense		
1985	Independente-SP		
1985	Guarani-MG		
- * Club domestic league appearances and goals as of 1 October 2023

Antenor Machado Filho (born 26 May 1952), simply known as Antenor, is a Brazilian former professional footballer who played as a full-back.

== Career ==
Antenor began his career with Atlético's youth, and promoted, he was part of the state champion squad in 1970 and the Brazilian squad in 1971. He was loaned to América and returned in 1973, when he had problems with coach Telê Santana after purchasing a Volkswagen Beetle. Antenor was traded to Nacional de Manaus where he played from 1974 to 1976, and in 1977, he was signed by São Paulo. Originally right back, in São Paulo he started to work with coach Rubens Minelli as left back. He was champion in 1977 against the club that revealed him, even cutting ties for a brief period with his mother, an Atlético Mineiro fan, after the title.

== Personal life ==
Antenor became an education teacher in the city of Sarzedo, Minas Gerais.

== Honours ==
Atlético Mineiro

- Campeonato Brasileiro: 1971
- Campeonato Mineiro: 1970

São Paulo

- Campeonato Brasileiro: 1977

Nacional

- Campeonato Amazonense: 1974, 1976

Sport Recife

- Campeonato Pernambucano: 1982

Atlético Goianiense

- Campeonato Goiano: 1985
