= Marião =

Brazilian footballer (1952–2011)

Personal information
- Full name: Mário Gomes Amado
- Date of birth: 3 August 1952
- Place of birth: Paraibuna, Brazil
- Date of death: 24 August 2011 (aged 59)
- Place of death: São José dos Campos, Brazil
- Position: Centre-back

Senior career*
Years	Team	Apps	(Gls)
1972	São José-SP		
1973	Operário-MS		
1973–1974	Guarani		
1974–1976	Operário-MS		
1977	Náutico		
1977	Internacional		
1978	Náutico		
1978–1980	São Paulo	50	(2)
1980–1982	Sport Recife		
1982	Colorado-PR		
1982	Jacareí		
1983–1984	Sport Recife		
1984–1985	Atlético Paranaense		
1985	Operário-MT		
1986	Taubaté		
1986	Sport Recife		

Managerial career
- 2006–2007: São José-SP
- 2008: Primeira Camisa
- 2009: Joseense
- * Club domestic league appearances and goals as of 29 January 2024

Mário Gomes Amado (3 August 1952 – 24 August 2011), better known as Marião, was a Brazilian professional footballer and manager. He played as a centre-back.

== Career ==
He played for major Brazilian football clubs as a central defender during the late 1970s, with emphasis on SC Internacional and São Paulo FC. He was a champion of the 1980 Campeonato Paulista. He also won state titles with Sport in the early 80s. As a coach, he worked on teams in the city of São José dos Campos, being runner-up in Série A3 in 2006 with São José, and the first coach of Primeira Camisa, a project club by the player Roque Júnior.

== Honours ==
Operário-MS

- Campeonato Mato-Grossense: 1974

São Paulo

- Campeonato Paulista: 1980

Sport

- Campeonato Pernambucano: 1981, 1982

== Death ==
Marião died on 24 August 2011, aged 59, victim of a cardiac arrest.
