= Bezerra (footballer, born 1949) =

Brazilian footballer

Personal information
- Full name: Juvenal de Souza
- Date of birth: 5 September 1949 (age 77)
- Place of birth: Altair, Brazil
- Position: Defender

Senior career*
| Years | Team | Apps | (Gls) |
| 1971 | Barretos | | |
| 1971–1976 | Guarani | | |
| 1976–1980 | São Paulo | 207 | (11) |
| 1980–1982 | Olímpia | | |
| 1982–1983 | Fernandópolis | | |
| 1983 | Sãocarlense | | |
| 1984 | Uberlândia | | |
| 1984 | Uberaba | | |
| 1984 | Olímpia | | |
| 1985–1989 | Barretos | | |
- * Club domestic league appearances and goals as of 21 September 2023

Juvenal de Souza (born 5 September 1949), better known as Bezerra, is a Brazilian former professional footballer who played as a defender.

== Career ==
Bezerra began his career in the city's amateur teams, until turning professional at Barretos EC in 1971. He later transferred to Guarani. At São Paulo FC he scored 207 and 11 goals, including the final of the 1977 Campeonato Brasileiro Série A.

Bezerra had to step away from football in the early 80s after being diagnosed with neurocysticercosis. After recovering, he played for several other clubs.

== Personal life ==
"Bezerra" (English: female calf) was a nickname given as a child, when Juvenal managed to find a calf that had escaped from the farm where his father worked.

== Honours ==
=== São Paulo ===
- Campeonato Brasileiro: 1977
