= Estádio Palma Travassos =

Stadium in Ribeirão Preto, Brazil

- Palma Travassos
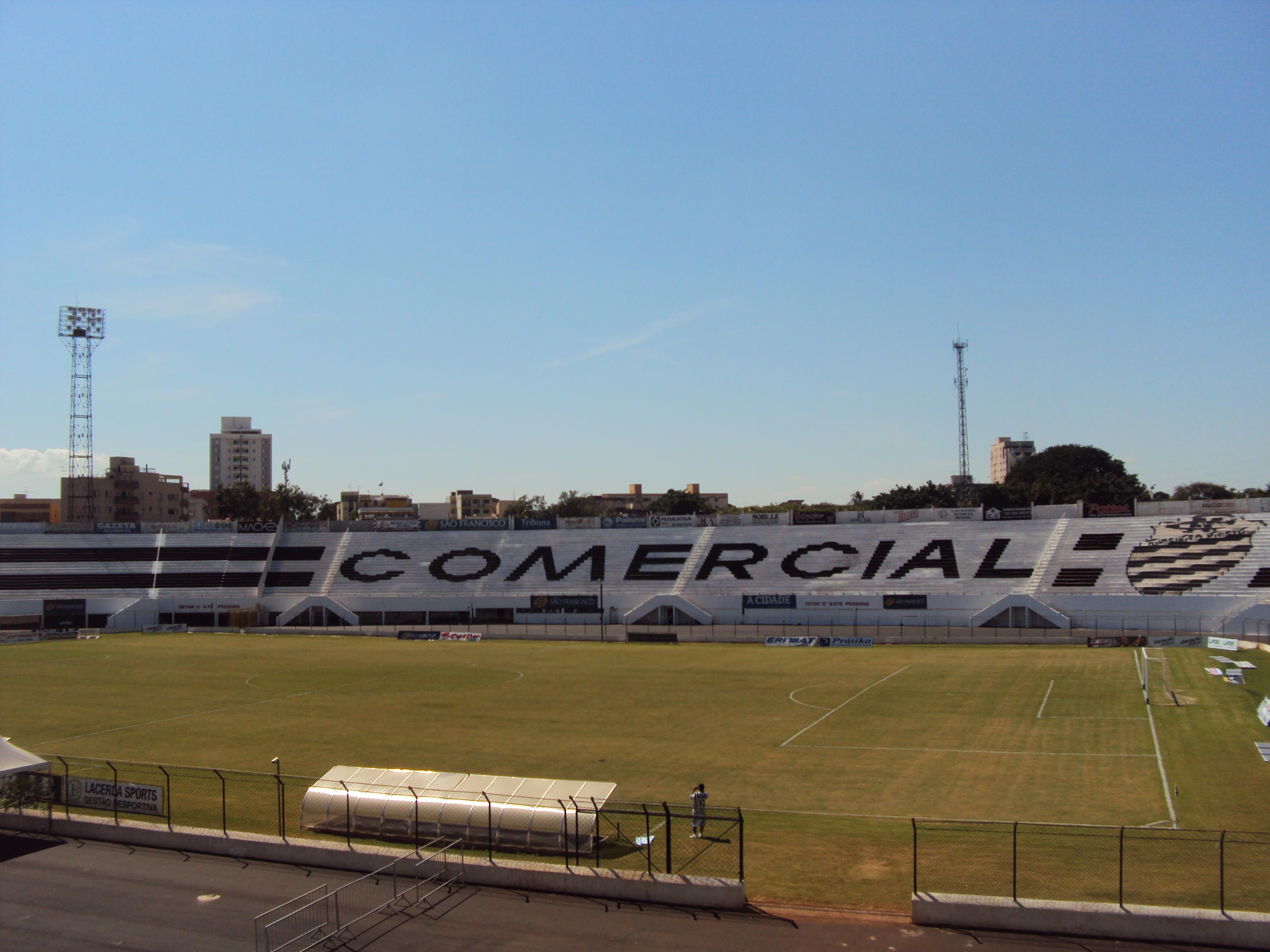
- Interactive map of Estádio Palma Travassos
- Full name: Estádio Dr. Francisco de Palma Travassos
- Location: Ribeirão Preto, Brazil
- Coordinates: 21°11′13″S 47°47′16″W
- Owner: Comercial
- Operator: Comercial
- Capacity: 17,775
- Surface: Natural grass
- Field size: 105 by 68 metres (114.8 yd × 74.4 yd)

Construction
- Built: 1964
- Opened: November 10, 1964

Tenant
- Comercial

Estádio Dr. Francisco de Palma Travassos, usually known as Estádio Palma Travassos, is a multi-use stadium in Ribeirão Preto, Brazil. It is currently used mostly for football matches and it is the home stadium of Comercial. The stadium has a capacity of 34,800 people. It was built in 1964.

Estádio Palma Travassos is owned by Comercial Futebol Clube (Ribeirão Preto). The stadium is named after Francisco de Palma Travassos, who donated the groundplot where the stadium was built.

== History ==
In 1964, the works on Estádio Palma Travassos were completed. The inaugural match was played on November 10 of that year, when Santos beat Comercial 3-2. The first goal of the stadium was scored by Comercial's Paulo Bin.

The stadium's attendance record currently stands at 32,400, set on July 20, 1986 when Comercial and Botafogo drew 0-0.
