= Jaiminho (footballer, born 1960) =

Brazilian footballer

Personal information
- Full name: Jaime Aparecido Alves
- Date of birth: 18 September 1960 (age 66)
- Place of birth: São Bernardo do Campo, Brazil
- Position: Forward

Youth career
- –1977: São Paulo

Senior career*
Years	Team	Apps	(Gls)
1977–1984	São Paulo	98	(9)
1979–1980	→ Colorado-PR (loan)		
1980	→ Inter de Limeira (loan)		
1981	→ Internacional (loan)		
1981–1982	→ Tampa Bay Rowdies (loan)		
1983	→ Santo André (loan)		
1984–1985	Colorado-PR		
1985	EC São Bernardo		
1985	Goiás		
1986	Grêmio Maringá		
1986	Ferroviário		
1987–1988	Santo André		
1988–1990	Olhanense		
1990–1991	Lusitano		
1991	Mangualde		
1992–1994	Witbank Spurs		
1994–1995	Mangualde		
- * Club domestic league appearances and goals as of 29 January 2024

Jaime Aparecido Alves (born 18 September 1960), simply known as Jaiminho, is a Brazilian former professional footballer who played as a forward.

== Career ==
Revealed in the youth sectors of São Paulo FC, he was unable to establish himself in the first team due to his temperament, being loaned out on several occasions. He made 98 appearances and scored 9 goals for the club. On loan, he was part of the state champion squads for Colorado-PR in 1980, and in 1981 for SC Internacional. He also played on teams in the United States, Portugal and South Africa.

On 2 March 1986, he scored the 3 goals of the game, in a historic turnaround for Grêmio Maringa against Londrina EC, at Estádio do Café.

== Honours ==
Colorado

- Campeonato Paranaense: 1980 (shared)

Internacional

- Campeonato Gaúcho: 1981
