= Geraldão (footballer, born 1949) =

Brazilian footballer (1949–2026)

Personal information
- Full name: Geraldo da Silva
- Date of birth: 25 July 1949
- Place of birth: Alvares Machado, São Paulo Brazil
- Date of death: 6 August 2026 (aged 77)
- Place of death: São Paulo, Brazil
- Position: Forward

Senior career*
Years	Team	Apps	(Gls)
1968	Prudentina		
1969	São Bento		
1970–1975	Botafogo-SP		
1975–1980	Corinthians	280	(91)
1978	→ Juventus-SP (loan)		
1981	Juventus-SP		
1981	Grêmio		
1982–1984	Internacional		
1984	Colorado-PR		
1985	Mixto		
1985	Francana		
1986–1987	Corinthians-PP		
1987	Itararé		
1988	Valinhos		
1989	Garça		
- * Club domestic league appearances and goals

Geraldo da Silva (25 July 1949 – 6 August 2026), better known as Geraldão, was a Brazilian professional footballer who played as a forward.

== Career ==
A center forward, Geraldão gained notability by being top scorer in the 1974 Campeonato Paulista playing for Botafogo de Ribeirão Preto, a team for which he scored 88 goals. He was hired by Corinthians where he was part of the state champion squad in 1977, in addition to playing in Rio Grande do Sul football for Grêmio in 1981, and later for Internacional, where he was champion and top scorer.

== Death ==
Geraldão died in the West Zone of São Paulo on 6 August 2026, at the age of 77.

== Honours ==
Corinthians

- Campeonato Paulista: 1977, 1979

Internacional

- Campeonato Gaúcho: 1982, 1983

Individual

- 1974 Campeonato Paulista top scorer: 23 goals
- 1982 Campeonato Gaúcho top scorer: 20 goals
