= Márcio Gugu =

Brazilian footballer

Personal information
- Full name: José Márcio Divino
- Date of birth: 29 June 1954 (age 72)
- Place of birth: Araguari, Brazil
- Height: 1.78 m (5 ft 10 in)
- Position: Centre-back

Senior career*
Years	Team	Apps	(Gls)
1971–1979	Atlético Mineiro	262	(9)
1983	Toledo		
- * Club domestic league appearances and goals as of 30 May 2024

José Márcio Divino (born 29 June 1954), better known as Márcio Gugu, is a Brazilian former professional footballer who played as a centre-back.

== Career ==
A defender who played for Atlético Mineiro during the 1970s, Márcio Gugu made 262 appearances for the club and scored 9 goals. He stood out for his indiscipline, which earned him the nickname "Márcio Paulada", but as the years went by, he became more technical in disarming. He ended his career in 1979, but in 1983 he received an invitation to play for Toledo EC during the Campeonato Paranaense.

== Honours ==
Atlético Mineiro

- Campeonato Mineiro: 1976, 1978, 1979
- Copa dos Campeões da Copa Brasil: 1978
- Taça Minas Gerais: 1975, 1976
- Taça Belo Horizonte: 1972
