= Alves (footballer) =

Brazilian footballer (born 1956)

Personal information
- Full name: Feliciano Alves Diniz Filho
- Date of birth: 6 December 1956 (age 69)
- Place of birth: Esmeraldas, Brazil
- Height: 1.71 m (5 ft 7 in)
- Position: Right back

Youth career
- 1971–1975: Atlético Mineiro

Senior career*
Years	Team	Apps	(Gls)
1975–1980	Atlético Mineiro	210	(19)
1981–1982	Portuguesa		
1981	→ Bahia (loan)		
1983	Cruzeiro	38	(2)
1984	Internacional		
1985	Portuguesa		
1985	Grêmio Maringá		
1986	Internacional		
1987	Francana		
1987	São José-SP		
1988	Náutico		
1988	Aimoré		
- * Club domestic league appearances and goals as of 29 May 2024

Feliciano Alves Diniz Filho (born 6 December 1956), simply known as Alves, is a Brazilian former professional footballer who played as a right back.

== Career ==
A strong-willed full-back, Alves was two-time champion of the Copa SP de Juniores with Atlético Mineiro. He was promoted to the main team by Telê Santana, and played 210 matches for the club, scoring 19 goals. He later played for Portuguesa, where he made 140 appearances, but there he became involved in controversy when he was barred by the club's president, Osvaldo Teixeira Duarte, from participating in the 1984 Summer Olympics. He transferred to Internacional in the same year, and was champion of Rio Grande do Sul. He still played for São José and Francana, until arriving at Náutico, where he was runner-up in Série B in 1988. After an episode of violence where his house was robbed in Recife, he ended his career with Aimoré, in São Leopoldo.

== Honours ==
Atlético Mineiro

- Campeonato Mineiro: 1976, 1979, 1980
- Copa dos Campeões da Copa Brasil: 1978
- Taça Minas Gerais: 1976, 1979
- Trofeo Costa del Sol: 1980
- Copa São Paulo de Futebol Júnior: 1975, 1976

Internacional

- Campeonato Gaúcho: 1984
