= Muricy Ramalho =

Brazilian footballer

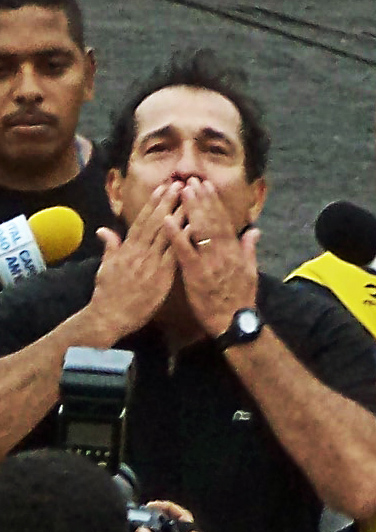

Personal information
- Date of birth: 30 November 1955 (age 70)
- Place of birth: São Paulo, Brazil
- Height: 1.72 m (5 ft 8 in)
- Position: Attacking midfielder

Youth career
- São Paulo

Senior career*
Years	Team	Apps	(Gls)
1973–1979	São Paulo	177	(26)
1973	→ Pontagrossense (loan)		
1979–1985	Puebla	149	(57)
1984	→ America (loan)	9	(0)

Managerial career
- 1993: Puebla
- 1994–1996: São Paulo (youth)
- 1997: Guarani
- 1998: Shanghai Shenhua
- 1999: Ituano
- 1999: Botafogo-SP
- 2000–2001: Portuguesa Santista
- 2001: Náutico
- 2001: Santa Cruz
- 2002: Náutico
- 2002: Figueirense
- 2003: Internacional
- 2004: São Caetano
- 2004–2005: Internacional
- 2006–2009: São Paulo
- 2009–2010: Palmeiras
- 2010–2011: Fluminense
- 2011–2013: Santos
- 2013–2015: São Paulo
- 2016: Flamengo
- 2021–2026: São Paulo (coordinator)
- * Club domestic league appearances and goals

Muricy Ramalho (born 30 November 1955) is a Brazilian former football coach and player.

During his playing career, he was as an attacking midfielder. His most recent position was as manager of Flamengo, until health issues forced him to step down in 2017. Between 2006 and 2008, Ramalho led São Paulo to three consecutive national championships. In 2010, he also led Fluminense to the title. On July 23, 2010, it was reported that he had been offered the post of the coach of the Brazil national team, to replace the sacked Dunga. His team at the time, however, Fluminense, refused to release him for the job.

Ramalho is also known by his paulistano accent, usually speaking expressions from this dialect.

== Playing career ==
During his playing career in the 1970s, Ramalho was a midfielder with São Paulo. Between 1973 and 1978, he played 177 games for the club, scoring 26 goals. Later in his career, he played in Mexico, being almost unknown in Brazil during that time. He was not called up for the 1978 World Cup due to a knee injury. After retiring, he started his career as a head coach.

== Head coaching career ==
Ramalho started his head coaching career as the head coach of Mexican club Puebla. He managed several clubs, including São Paulo, his former club as a player, and Internacional.

=== "Expressinho" ===
Ramalho was the São Paulo youth squad head coach between 1994 and 1996. He was the manager of the São Paulo team that won the Copa CONMEBOL in 1994. That team was formed from reserve and youth players, receiving the nickname "Expressinho". Despite the technical limitations of the team, São Paulo won the cup, defeating Peñarol of Uruguay in the final. Players such as Denílson and Rogério Ceni were discovered by Ramalho during the competition.

=== 2006–2009 ===
After working for Internacional, including taking them to runners-up in the Campeonato Brasileiro de 2005, on January 3, 2006, he went back to manage São Paulo, signing a one-year contract, ten years after his first stint with the club. He was the head coach of São Paulo for three years, winning the Série A three times in a row. His methods and the playing style of his team did not win universal admiration, however. After a poor start in the league and being eliminated from the Libertadores Cup in 2009 to Cruzeiro, his fourth consecutive elimination from the tournament, the board fired him.

=== 2009 ===
After almost a month of negotiations, Ramalho agreed to manage the team of Palmeiras, signing a contract on July 22, 2009.

=== 2010 ===
After six months as Palmeiras' head coach, Ramalho was fired on February 18, 2010, after a 1–4 defeat against São Caetano. On April 25, he was announced as the new head coach of Fluminense, his second time working in Rio de Janeiro. On July 23, he was appointed as head coach of the Brazil national team, but was not released by the Rio de Janeiro-based team, prompting the Brazil Football Confederation to choose Mano Menezes instead.

Ramalho led Fluminense to win that year's Brazilian League title, the club's third national championship, and his fourth as a manager.

=== 2011–2013 ===
After a dismissal from Fluminense due to a poor start to the season, on April 6, 2011, it was announced that Ramalho would take charge of Santos until the end of the 2011 season. He led Santos to the 2011 Campeonato Paulista title and later to the 2011 Copa Libertadores title. Ramalho then renewed his contract until December 2013. In 2012, the team won the State Championship once again, as well as the Recopa Sudamericana.

After losing the 2013 State Championship, and after having star player Neymar sold to Barcelona, Ramalho, on 31 May, was dismissed by club.

=== Return to São Paulo ===
On September 9, 2013, São Paulo was in relegation zone of Série A, leading the directors of the club to sack Paulo Autuori, and sign Ramalho as his replacement. Ramalho's first game back in charge was a 1–0 victory over Ponte Preta. During the match, São Paulo fans at the Morumbi Stadium shouted "É, Muricy" ("Yeah, Muricy") in satisfaction of Ramalho's return.

On November 2, 2013, in an interview with Brazilian newspaper O Estado de S. Paulo, Ramalho affirmed the following words:

Winning here is always good and important anywhere, but, of course, for São Paulo it is a very different thing because I was born here, and when you have a history and win again, this history goes on and gets new chapters. In Brazil, it is fundamental for a coach to win, independent of the affection the supporters have for you, and São Paulo is the biggest club in Brazil and the most successful one and the fans got used to victories therefore we always have to win. But, of course, winning for São Paulo is special for me.

— Muricy Ramalho, exalting his return to São Paulo

On December 7, 2013, Ramalho, after a very successful return ahead of the club, renewed his contract with São Paulo for two more seasons. Upon signing, he stated, "I am happy to stay, because here is my home and the affection the supporters show for me motivates me even further. I am very happy for we have had an excellent year."

On April 6, 2015, Ramalho stepped down as coach of São Paulo due to illness; he had been hospitalized in January with a digestive disease.

=== Flamengo ===
Ramalho was appointed head coach of Flamengo in early 2016, but was forced to resign due to poor health in May of that year. He was replaced by Flamengo U-20 coach Zé Ricardo.

== Post career ==
After retiring as a coach, Muricy worked as a commentator on the Sportv channel. In 2021, he was invited to take on the role of sports coordinator of São Paulo FC in Julio Casares' administration, a position he held until January 2026 when he left due to worsening health problems.

== Controversies ==
While with Santos, in December 2011, at the final of the 2011 FIFA Club World Cup against Barcelona, and after his team lost 4–0, Ramalho praised Barça manager Pep Guardiola's work, though stated that it was simple for him since he had the financial clout to sign any player in the world. Ramalho said that European coaches would only score top marks in his book once they had the same success when coaching a Brazilian side. "Only when they win trophies here [Brazil] they will be the best coaches in the world." He was referring to the lack of funding, lack of good players – allegedly who all play in Europe – and the ever-growing pressure to perform.

In February 2013, the media reported that Ramalho engaged in a verbal exchange with Neymar and Joey Barton. The latter had been little impressed by Neymar's performances in a friendly match in London, later stating, "I would not pay a lot of money to sign him." After journalists' insistence on a comment, Ramalho responded that although he meant no disrespect, he did not know who Barton was.

In May 2013, Ramalho spoke about a fake profile on the social network Facebook that has a lot of friends. According to the coach, the creator of profile "must be an idiot that doesn't have anything to do. He should do something for himself, not for someone else".

In July 2013, two months after leaving Santos, Ramalho said that if he was to work in Europe, he would have been given a 30-year contract and would have a statue dedicated to him afterwards because even "[Arsène] Wenger can coach Arsenal for almost 15 years having had so little success". Also in July 2013, in a new interview, Ramalho spoke about players he had previously coached. According to the coach, Müller, currently a football pundit, was a "difficult player, it was complicated. It was really very hard. He was a excellent player, but ain't easy to work with him". Meanwhile, on the defender Breno, whom Ramalho coached with at São Paulo, he stated, "He thought he was [Franz] Beckenbauer."

Ramalho also is known for his roughness and lack of patience with bad journalists and those who work to create a controversy where one does not exist.

In April 2014, Ramalho was praised by one journalist in reference to his past as a football player. Ramalho said he was ten times better than the present players of São Paulo. To this day, fans bring flags with his face and name to Estádio do Morumbi. "I played at least ten times better. But they haven't seen it, and I don't talk about it because it is a thing from the past. In this team, I would pick up my number 8 jersey and the coach would only have to think about the other players," he added.

== Managerial statistics ==
As of match played 5 July 2025

Managerial record by team and tenure
Team	Nat	From	To	Record							
Team	Nat	From	To	G	W	D	L	GF	GA	GD	Win %
Puebla	(Mexico)	1 August 1993	30 December 1993	19	6	9	4	25	22	+3	31.58
São Paulo (joint)	(Brazil)	14 February 1995	12 May 1995	7	3	3	1	13	6	+7	42.86
São Paulo	(Brazil)	30 January 1996	17 August 1996	37	22	7	8	75	45	+30	59.46
São Paulo	(Brazil)	27 October 1996	15 April 1997	29	11	13	5	50	38	+12	37.93
Guarani	(Brazil)	21 April 1997	1 December 1997	32	9	11	12	42	50	−8	28.13
Shanghai Shenhua	(China)	1 July 1998	31 December 1998	21	12	7	2	38	18	+20	57.14
Náutico	(Brazil)	5 May 2001	12 October 2002	109	54	23	32	171	123	+48	49.54
Internacional	(Brazil)	9 December 2002	17 December 2003	61	31	12	18	84	70	+14	50.82
São Caetano	(Brazil)	16 February 2004	22 July 2004	36	16	12	8	65	33	+32	44.44
Internacional	(Brazil)	1 September 2004	12 December 2005	100	54	20	26	156	107	+49	54.00
São Paulo	(Brazil)	3 January 2006	20 June 2009	252	139	67	46	412	223	+189	55.16
Palmeiras	(Brazil)	21 July 2009	18 February 2010	36	14	11	11	54	48	+6	38.89
Fluminense	(Brazil)	25 April 2010	13 March 2011	53	28	14	11	93	57	+36	52.83
Santos	(Brazil)	8 April 2011	31 May 2013	160	75	46	39	258	173	+85	46.88
São Paulo	(Brazil)	12 September 2013	5 April 2015	111	60	21	30	176	112	+64	54.05
Flamengo	(Brazil)	8 December 2015	26 May 2016	25	13	6	6	40	17	+23	52.00
Total				1,102	551	286	265	1,774	1,165	+609	50.00

== Honours ==
=== Player ===
São Paulo

- Campeonato Paulista: 1975
- Taça dos Campeões Estaduais Rio – São Paulo: 1975
- Campeonato Brasileiro Série A: 1977

Puebla

- Liga MX: 1982-83

=== Manager ===
São Paulo

- Campeonato Brasileiro Série A: 2006, 2007, 2008
- Copa CONMEBOL: 1994
- Copa Masters CONMEBOL: 1996

Shanghai Shenhua

- Chinese FA Cup: 1998
- Chinese FA Super Cup: 1998

Náutico

- Campeonato Pernambucano: 2001, 2002

Internacional

- Campeonato Gaúcho: 2003, 2005

São Caetano

- Campeonato Paulista: 2004

Fluminense

- Campeonato Brasileiro Série A: 2010

Santos

- Copa Libertadores: 2011
- Recopa Sudamericana: 2012
- Campeonato Paulista: 2011, 2012

== See also ==
- List of football managers with the most matches
