= Estádio Alfredo de Castilho =

Soccer stadium in Bauru, São Paulo, Brazil

Alfredo de Castilho
- Alfredão
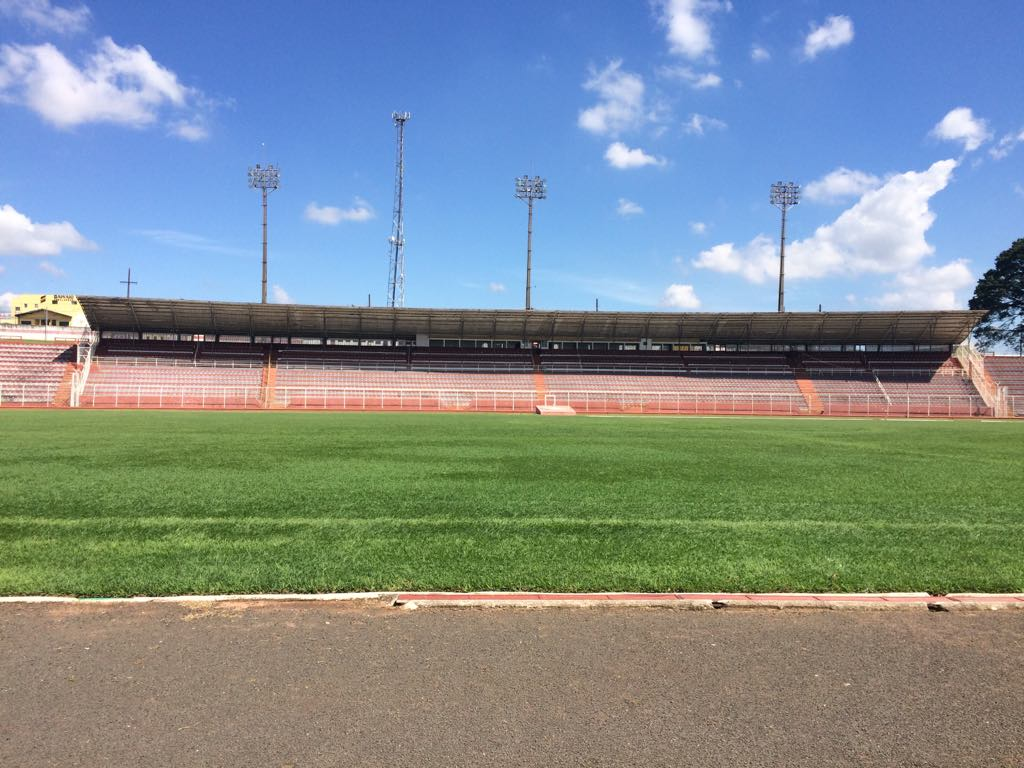
- Sisbrace
- Interactive map of Alfredo de Castilho
- Full name: Estádio Doutor Alfredo de Castilho
- Former names: Estádio Ubaldo de Medeiros (1960)
- Location: Bauru, SP, Brazil
- Coordinates: 22°19′26.56″S 49°5′51.49″W
- Owner: Noroeste
- Operator: Noroeste
- Capacity: 18,866
- Surface: Natural grass
- Record attendance: 23,640 (Noroeste 1–2 Palmeiras, 15 September 1974)
- Field size: 105 by 70 metres (114.8 yd × 76.6 yd)

Construction
- Built: 1959–1960
- Opened: 5 June 1960
- Renovated: 1966

Tenant
- Noroeste

Estádio Alfredo de Castilho, known as Alfredo de Castilho or Alfredão, is a multi-use stadium in Bauru, São Paulo, Brazil. It is used mostly for football matches, and has a maximum capacity of 18,866 people.

== History ==
A stadium named after Alfredo de Castilho was built in 1935, honouring an engineer who was the director of NOB (Noroeste de Obras do Brasil) at the time. It was used until 23 November 1958, when a fire destroyed a part of the stands during a match against São Paulo.

After the fire, Noroeste played at Estádio Antônio Garcia, owned by Bauru Atlético Clube, until the inauguration of Estádio Ubaldo Medeiros on 5 June 1960, in a match against Palmeiras. The new stadium was later renamed to the original name of Alfredo de Castilho just months later, and purchased by Noroeste in 1986.
