= Serginho Chulapa =

Brazilian footballer

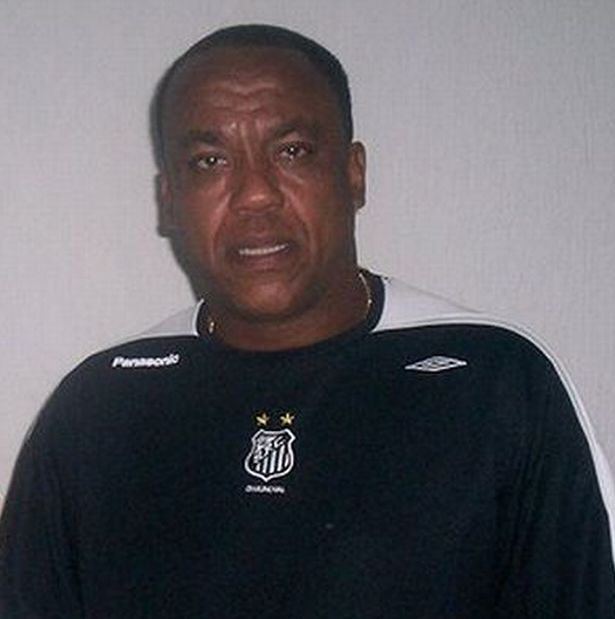

Personal information
- Full name: Sérgio Bernardino
- Date of birth: 23 December 1953 (age 72)
- Place of birth: São Paulo, Brazil
- Height: 1.94 m (6 ft 4 in)
- Position: Striker

Youth career
- –1968: Portuguesa
- 1970–1973: São Paulo

Senior career*
Years	Team	Apps	(Gls)
1973–1982	São Paulo	399	(242)
1973	→ Marília (loan)	17	(8)
1983–1984	Santos	36	(32)
1985	Corinthians	17	(6)
1986	Santos	9	(1)
1987	Marítimo	5	(4)
1988	Portuguesa Santista		
1988	Santos		
1988–1989	Malatyaspor	24	(7)
1989–1990	Santos	18	(3)
1990–1991	Portuguesa Santista		
1992	São Caetano		
1993	Atlético Sorocaba		

International career
1979–1982	Brazil	20	(8)

Managerial career
- 1994: Santos (assistant)
- 1994: Santos
- 1995: União São João
- 1996: Portuguesa Santista
- 1997: Botafogo-SP
- 1997: São Caetano
- 1998: Sãocarlense
- 1999: Portuguesa Santista
- 1999: Remo
- 2000: Araçatuba
- 2000–2001: Santos (assistant)
- 2001: Santos
- 2002: Portuguesa Santista
- 2005: Santos (interim)
- 2005–2007: Santos (assistant)
- 2008: Portuguesa Santista
- 2008–2022: Santos (assistant)
- 2009: Santos (interim)
- 2018: Santos (interim)
- * Club domestic league appearances and goals

Sérgio Bernardino (born 23 December 1953), known as Serginho Chulapa or simply Serginho, is a Brazilian football coach and retired professional footballer who played as a striker. He spent most of his career with São Paulo and represented Brazil at the 1982 FIFA World Cup.

== Club career ==
=== São Paulo ===
Born in São Paulo, Serginho was a São Paulo youth graduate. He made his first-team debut on 6 June 1973, in a 0–0 friendly draw against Bahia, and scored his first goal four days later in a 1–1 draw against Corinthians for the Taça Estado de São Paulo tournament.

In 1974, returning from a loan to Série B side Marília, Serginho became a mainstay at Tricolor, scoring an impressive 48 goals in the 1977 season.

On 12 February 1978, Serginho reportedly assaulted the linesman Vandevaldo Rangel, and was handed a 14-month suspension (he only served eleven), subsequently missing out the 1978 FIFA World Cup (which he was expected to feature). In the 1981 Finals, he received a straight red card after kicking goalkeeper Emerson Leão.

=== Santos ===
In 1983 Serginho joined Santos, and was the top goalscorer of both Campeonato Paulista and Série A, both with 22 goals. With the club he lifted the state championship the following year, scoring 74 goals in 110 matches during his first spell.

=== Corinthians ===
In 1985, Serginho moved to rivals Corinthians, joining a team that was known as Selecão Corinthiana due to the high level of quality of the squad. After an above-average campaign both individually and teamwise, he left the club.

=== Later career ===
Serginho returned to Santos in 1986, later stating that he took a "sabbatical year" at Corinthians. He would, however, struggle with injuries during his second spell, and subsequently moved to Portugal's Marítimo.

Returning to Santos for a third spell in 1988, Serginho featured regularly before moving to Malatyaspor in Turkey. He went back to his previous club in 1989, and subsequently represented Portuguesa Santista, São Caetano and Atlético Sorocaba; he retired with the latter in 1993, aged 39.

== International career ==
For the Brazil national team Serginho was capped 20 times between May 1979 and July 1982, and participated at 1982 FIFA World Cup, where he played in all five matches and scored two goals.

Serginho further represented Brazil in the 1990 edition of the World Cup of Masters, scoring in the final against Netherlands.

== Coaching career ==
Serginho returned to Santos in 1994, as Pepe's assistant. On 8 March of that year, after the latter's dismissal he was appointed interim manager, and remained in charge of the club until November, being himself sacked after headbutting a journalist. In 1995 he was in charge of União São João, but was relieved from his duties in March.

In 1996 Serginho was in charge of another club he represented as a player, Portuguesa Santista, and took the side back to the first division of the Paulistão. He was in charge of São Caetano in the following year, and returned to Briosa in 1999.

In 2000, after spells in charge of Remo and Araçatuba, Serginho returned to Santos as Geninho's assistant. In August 2001, he was definitely appointed manager, but he resigned shortly after.

For the 2002 campaign, Serginho was in charge of former side Portuguesa Santista. He was still linked to Santos from 2002 to 2004, but was removed from his role as Leão was the manager. Returning as an assistant in 2005, he was also an interim after Vanderlei Luxemburgo's departure.

On 29 February 2008, Serginho was appointed manager of Portuguesa Santista for the fourth time. On 8 August he returned to Santos as Márcio Fernandes' assistant. In July of the following year he became an interim, with his spell being marked by a push in a field reporter after a 3–3 home draw against Grêmio Barueri.

On 23 July 2018, after the departure of Jair Ventura, Serginho returned to managerial duties after nearly nine years as an assistant. He returned to his previous duties after the appointment of Cuca.

Chulapa left his coaching duties at Santos on 3 August 2022, after joining the club's idols programme.

== Managerial statistics ==
As of 5 August 2020

Managerial record by team and tenure
Team	Nat	From	To	Record								Ref
Team	Nat	From	To	G	W	D	L	GF	GA	GD	Win %	Ref
Santos	(Brazil)	8 March 1994	19 November 1994	44	22	13	9	64	42	+22	50.00	
União São João	(Brazil)	January 1995	March 1995	5	1	0	4	3	8	−5	20.00	
Santos	(Brazil)	27 August 2001	9 September 2001	4	0	2	2	3	6	−3	0.00	
Santos (interim)	(Brazil)	21 November 2005	5 December 2005	2	1	0	1	3	4	−1	50.00	
Portuguesa Santista	(Brazil)	29 February 2008	20 March 2008	5	2	0	3	7	8	−1	40.00	
Santos (interim)	(Brazil)	13 July 2009	19 July 2009	2	0	1	1	4	5	−1	0.00	
Santos (interim)	(Brazil)	20 June 2015	20 June 2015	1	1	0	0	1	0	+1	100.00	
Santos (interim)	(Brazil)	23 July 2018	30 July 2018	2	0	1	1	1	2	−1	0.00	
Total				65	27	17	21	86	75	+11	41.54	—

== Honours ==
=== Player ===
São Paulo

- Campeonato Brasileiro Série A: 1977
- Campeonato Paulista: 1975, 1980, 1981

Santos

- Campeonato Paulista: 1984

Individual

- Campeonato Brasileiro Série A top scorer: 1983 (22 goals)
- Campeonato Paulista top scorer: 1975 (22 goals), 1977 (32 goals), 1983 (22 goals), 1984 (16 goals)
