= Teodoro (footballer) =

Brazilian footballer

Personal information
- Full name: Teodoro Matos Santana
- Date of birth: 22 October 1946
- Place of birth: Santos, Brazil
- Date of death: 12 June 2013 (aged 66)
- Place of death: Santos, Brazil
- Position: Midfielder

Senior career*
Years	Team	Apps	(Gls)
- Ponte Preta
1971–1980	São Paulo		
1980–1981	Dallas Tornado	11	(0)
1980–1981	Dallas Tornado (indoor)	6	(0)
1982	São Paulo		
- * Club domestic league appearances and goals

Teodoro Matos Santana (22 October 1946 – 12 June 2013) was a Brazilian professional footballer who played as a midfielder.

== Career ==
After previously playing for Ponte Preta, Teodoro made 303 appearances for São Paulo in all competitions, winning the 1977 national title and the 1980 regional title. He later played in the United States for the Dallas Tornado.

== Later life and death ==
Teodoro died on 12 June 2013, at the age of 66, from pancreatic cancer.
