= Neca (footballer, born 1950) =

Brazilian footballer

Personal information
- Full name: Antônio Rodrigues Filho
- Date of birth: 15 April 1950 (age 76)
- Place of birth: Rio Grande, Brazil
- Position: Midfielder

Youth career
- –1967: Rio Grande

Senior career*
Years	Team	Apps	(Gls)
1967–1968	Rio Grande		
1968–1974	Esportivo		
1974	Goiás		
1975–1976	Grêmio	108	(59)
1976	Corinthians	22	(10)
1977	Cruzeiro	45	(18)
1977–1979	São Paulo	107	(29)
1980	America-RJ		
1980	Taubaté		
1981–1984	São Paulo-RS		
1984–1985	Rio-Grandense		
1986	São Paulo-RS		

International career
1976	Brazil	3	(1)
- * Club domestic league appearances and goals as of 23 September 2023

Antônio Rodrigues Filho (born 15 April 1950), better known as Neca, is a Brazilian former professional footballer who played as a midfielder.

== Career ==
A midfielder of great quality, he emerged in football in the interior of Rio Grande do Sul, being hired in 1968 by Grêmio. Despite his talent, he did not win titles at the club, and soon went to Corinthians and then to Cruzeiro, where he became state champion in 1976. title In 1977, at São Paulo FC, he became Brazilian champion.

== International career ==
For Brazil national team, Neca played 3 official matches and scored one goal.

No.	Cap	Date	Venue	Opponent	Score	Result	Competition	Ref.
1	1	19 May 1976	Maracanã, Rio de Janeiro, Brazil	Argentina	2–0	2–0	Taça do Atlântico / Copa Roca	

== Honours ==
Esportivo

- Campeonato Gaúcho Série A2: 1969

Cruzeiro

- Campeonato Mineiro: 1977

São Paulo

- Campeonato Brasileiro: 1977
