= Estádio Bento de Abreu =

Soccer stadium in Brazil

Coordinates: 22°13′10.12″S 49°56′21.86″W

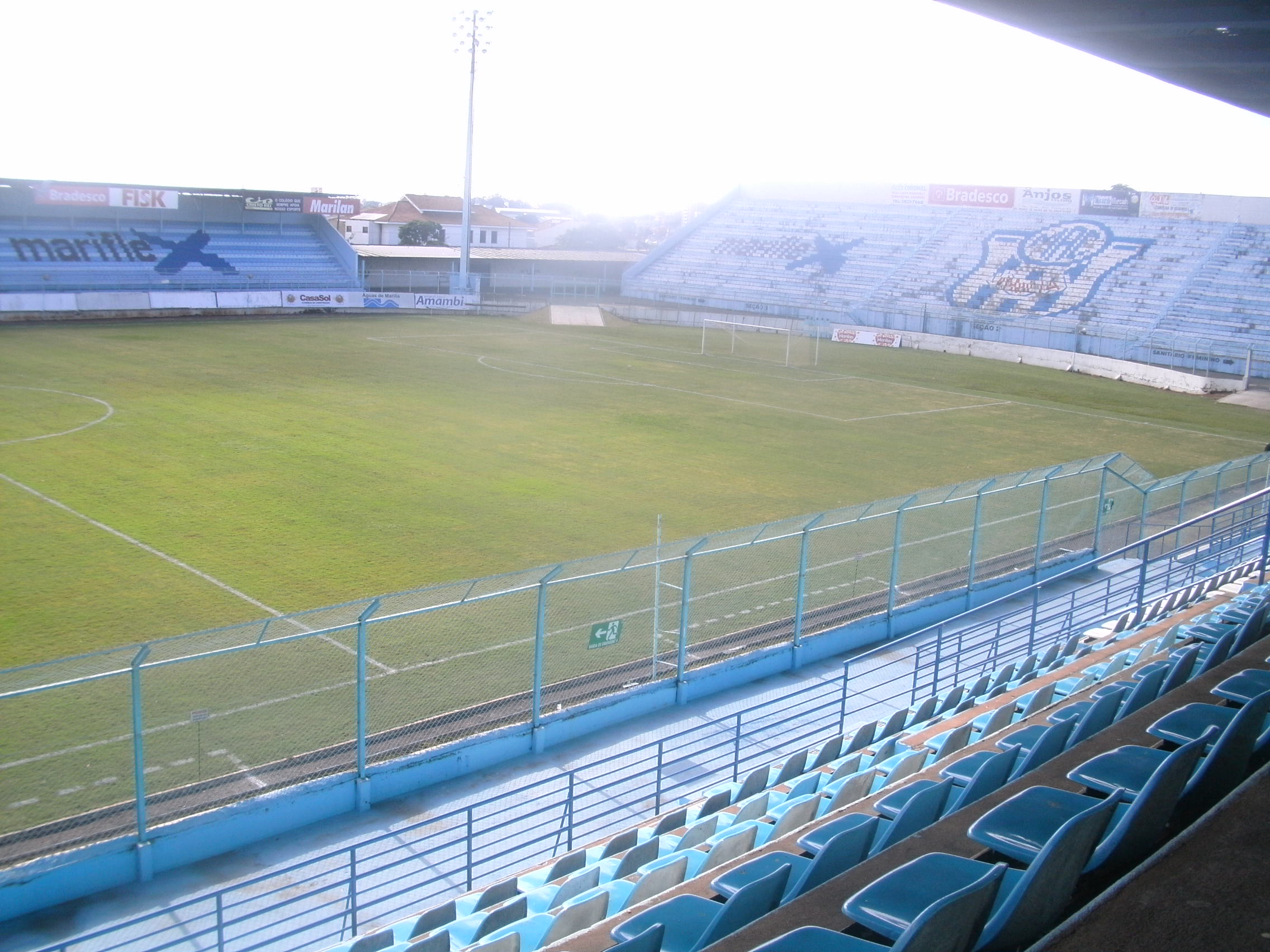
- Sisbrace
- Interactive map of Estádio Bento de Abreu
- Full name: Estádio Municipal Bento de Abreu Sampaio Vidal
- Location: Marília, Brazil
- Owner: Municipality of Marília
- Capacity: 15,010
- Surface: Grass
- Field size: 105 by 68 metres (114.8 yd × 74.4 yd)

Construction
- Opened: April 4, 1967

Tenant
- Marília Atlético Clube

Estádio Municipal Bento de Abreu Sampaio Vidal, usually known as Estádio Bento de Abreu or, sometimes by its nickname Abreuzão is a multi-use stadium in Marília, Brazil. It is currently used mostly for football matches. The stadium has a capacity of 19,800 people. It was inaugurated on April 4, 1967.

The stadium is owned by the Marília City Hall, and it is the home stadium of Marília Atlético Clube.
