= Rubens Minelli =

Brazilian footballer and manager (1928–2023)

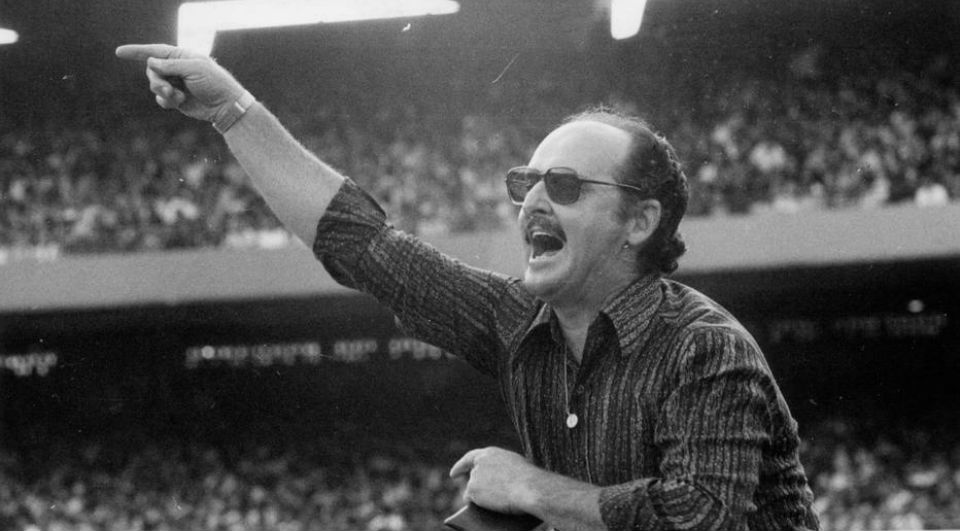

Personal information
- Full name: Rubens Francisco Minelli
- Date of birth: 19 December 1928
- Place of birth: São Paulo, Brazil
- Date of death: 23 November 2023 (aged 94)
- Place of death: São Paulo, Brazil
- Position: Winger

Managerial career
- Years: Team
- 1963–1965: América (SP)
- 1966: Botafogo (SP)
- 1966: América (SP)
- 1967: Sport
- 1968: Francana
- 1969: Guarani
- 1969–1971: Palmeiras
- 1971–1973: Portuguesa
- 1973: Rio Preto
- 1974–1976: Internacional
- 1977–1979: São Paulo
- 1979–1980: Al-Hilal
- 1982–1983: Palmeiras
- 1984: Atlético Mineiro
- 1985: Grêmio
- 1986: Corinthians
- 1987–1988: Palmeiras
- 1988–1989: Grêmio
- 1990: Paraná
- 1991: Rio Branco (SP)
- 1992: Santos
- 1995: XV de Piracicaba
- 1994: Ferroviária
- 1994–1997: Paraná
- 1997–1998: Coritiba

Rubens Francisco Minelli (19 December 1928 – 23 November 2023) was a Brazilian football player and manager.

As a player, he played as a winger for Ypiranga, Nacional (SP), Palmeiras, Taubaté and São Bento, where he ended his career after breaking a leg when he was 27.

Eight years later, he started his career as a manager for América, and coached many clubs of Brazil, like Internacional, São Paulo, Palmeiras, Grêmio, Paraná, Sport, Francana, Corinthians, Santos, Portuguesa, Guarani, Ponte Preta, Rio Branco, Ferroviária, Atlético Mineiro and Coritiba. Later, he moved abroad to manage Al-Hilal and the Saudi Arabia national team in Saudi Arabia.

Minelli died from an infection on 23 November 2023, at the age of 94.

Minelli won many trophies throughout his managerial career, especially in clubs that were located in either Rio Grande de Sul or Paulista

== Managerial statistics ==
Team	Nation	From	To	Record							
Team	Nation	From	To	G	W	D	L	F	A	GD	Win %
América-SP	Brazil	1963	1965	54	25	15	14	77	58	+19	46.3
Botafogo-SP	Brazil	1966	1966	14	6	2	6	30	35	-5	42.86
América-SP	Brazil	1966	1966	6	1	1	4	6	14	-8	16.67
Sport	Brazil	11 June 1967	31 November 1967	16	10	2	4	25	18	+7	62.5
Francana	Brazil	10 June 1968	8 December 1968	25	14	5	6	35	22	+13	56
Guarani	Brazil	15 January 1969	22 August 1969	26	9	5	12	35	40	-5	34.62
Palmeiras	Brazil	23 August 1969	24 July 1971	88	50	19	19	135	71	+64	56.82
Portuguesa	Brazil	30 July 1971	28 December 1973	117	34	41	42	131	132	-1	29.06
Internacional	Brazil	14 February 1974	20 December 1976	158	115	28	15	334	82	+252	72.78
Francana	Brazil	1 January 1977	4 December 1977	37	22	7	8	51	26	+25	59.46
São Paulo FC	Brazil	5 December 1977	23 July 1979	102	46	29	27	144	96	+48	45.1
Al-Hilal	Saudi Arabia	1 August 1979	4 May 1980	23	17	2	4	56	17	+39	73.91
Saudi Arabia	Saudi Arabia	30 January 1980	19 December 1981	22	9	3	10	31	30	+1	40.91
Palmeiras	Brazil	10 January 1982	30 November 1983	109	44	45	20	153	99	+54	40.37
Atlético Mineiro	Brazil	15 January 1984	12 December 1984	44	24	9	11	67	31	+36	54.55
Grêmio	Brazil	8 January 1985	15 December 1985	46	24	14	8	81	38	+43	52.17
Corinthians	Brazil	1 February 1986	22 December 1986	70	32	22	16	92	57	+45	45.71
Palmeiras	Brazil	1 March 1987	30 July 1988	80	30	32	18	77	61	+16	37.5
Grêmio	Brazil	10 August 1988	18 December 1989	72	37	21	14	104	53	+51	51.39
Paraná	Brazil	10 January 1990	12 December 1990	37	15	17	5	53	23	+30	40.54
Rio Branco-SP	Brazil	17 July 1991	17 December 1991	26	10	5	11	24	22	+2	40.54
Santos	Brazil	19 December 1991	26 February 1992	6	2	2	2	5	8	-3	33.33
Paraná	Brazil	18 January 1993	16 November 1993	47	26	16	5	85	31	+54	40.54
Ferroviária	Brazil	9 January 1994	10 December 1994	45	16	10	19	49	66	-17	40.54
XV de Piracicaba	Brazil	9 January 1994	10 December 1994	42	16	12	14	53	47	+6	38.1
Paraná	Brazil	25 January 1996	12 November 1997	113	53	29	31	142	81	+61	46.9
Coritiba	Brazil	8 January 1998	1998	57	29	19	9	92	62	+30	50.88
Total				1,482	716	412	354	2,171	1,320	+851	48.31

== Honours ==
América (SP)

- Campeonato Paulista Série A2: 1963

Sport Club Recife

- Campeonato Pernambucano: 1966

Palmeiras

- Serié A: 1969

Internacional

- Serié A: 1975, 1976
- Campeonato Gaúcho: 1974, 1975, 1976

Francana

- Campeonato Paulista Série A2: 1977

São Paulo

- Serié A: 1977

Al-Hilal

- Crown Prince Cup: 1979–80

Grêmio

- Campeonato Gaúcho: 1985

Paraná

- Campeonato Paranaense: 1993, 1994, 1997

== See also ==
- List of football managers with the most matches
