= Getúlio (footballer, born 1954) =

Brazilian footballer (born 1954)

Personal information
- Full name: Getúlio Costa de Oliveira
- Date of birth: 25 February 1954 (age 72)
- Place of birth: Belo Horizonte, Brazil
- Height: 1.74 m (5 ft 9 in)
- Position: Right-back

Senior career*
Years	Team	Apps	(Gls)
1974–1977	Atlético Mineiro		
1977–1984	São Paulo		
1984–1986	Fluminense		
1986–1988	Los Angeles Kickers		

International career
1975–1981	Brazil	18	(1)
- * Club domestic league appearances and goals

Getúlio Costa de Oliveira (born 25 February 1954), known as just Getúlio, is a Brazilian former professional footballer who played as a right-back. He made 18 appearances for the Brazil national team from 1975 to 1981. He was also part of Brazil's squad for the 1975 Copa América tournament.
