= Chicão (footballer, born 1949) =

Brazilian footballer

Personal information
- Full name: Francisco Jezuíno Avanzi
- Date of birth: 30 January 1949
- Place of birth: Brazil
- Date of death: 8 October 2008 (aged 59)

International career
Years	Team	Apps	(Gls)
1976–1979	Brazil	9	(0)

Francisco Jezuíno Avanzi (30 January 1949 – 8 October 2008), best known as Chicão, was a Brazilian association football player in defensive midfielder role. He was born in Piracicaba, São Paulo State.

In his career (1968–1985) he played for several clubs: XV de Piracicaba, União Barbarense, São Bento, Ponte Preta, São Paulo FC, Atlético Mineiro, Santos FC, Londrina, Corinthians Presidente Prudente, Botafogo-SP and Mogi Mirim.

He won one São Paulo State League (1975), one Brazilian League (1977) and one Minas Gerais State League (1980). For the Brazil national football team he got nine international caps, from February 1976 to August 1979, never scored a goal, and was on their roster for 1978 FIFA World Cup, playing in three games.

He died in October 2008 from cancer in São Paulo.
