= List of Brazilian football derbies =

This is a list of Brazilian football derbies, sorted by state. Only derbies between professional clubs are listed below.

== Acre ==
- Clássico Pai e Filho (The Father and Son Derby): Juventus vs. Rio Branco
- Clássico Vovô (The Grandpa Derby): Independência vs. Rio Branco

== Alagoas ==
- Clássico das Multidões (The Crowds Derby): CRB vs. CSA
- Arapiraca derby: ASA vs. Cruzeiro de Arapiraca

== Amapá ==
- Macapá derby: São José vs. Ypiranga

== Amazonas ==
- Rio–Nal: Nacional vs. Rio Negro
- São–Nal or Clássico Azul (The Blue Derby): Nacional vs. São Raimundo
- Clássico Galo Preto (The Black Rooster Derby): São Raimundo vs. Sul América
- Clássico da Luta (The Fight Derby): Rio Negro vs. São Raimundo
- Clássico Pai e Filho (The Father and Son Derby): Fast Clube vs. Nacional
- Manaus derby: Amazonas FC vs. Manaus FC

== Bahia ==
=== Salvador derbies ===
- Ba–Vi: Bahia vs. Vitória
- Clássico de Ouro (The Gold Derby): Galícia vs. Ypiranga
- Clássico do Pote (The Bowl Derby): Bahia vs. Botafogo de Salvador
- Clássico das Cores (The Colors Derby): Bahia vs. Galícia
- Clássico do Povo (The People Derby): Bahia vs. Ypiranga

=== Other cities ===
- Camaçari derby: Camaçari vs. Camaçariense
- Feira de Santana derby: Bahia de Feira vs. Fluminense de Feira
- Juazeiro derby or Ju–Ju: Juazeiro vs. Juazeirense
- Vitória da Conquista derby or Clássico do Café (The Coffee Derby): Serrano vs. Vitória da Conquista

=== Intercities ===
- Clássico da Laranja (The Orange Derby): Atlético de Alagoinhas vs. Catuense
- Clássico do Cacau (The Cocoa Derby): Itabuna vs. Colo-Colo

== Ceará ==
- Clássico-Rei (The Derby-King): Ceará vs. Fortaleza
- Clássico da Paz (The Peace Derby): Ceará vs. Ferroviário
- Clássico das Cores (The Colors Derby): Ferroviário vs. Fortaleza
- Juazeiro do Norte derby: Guarani vs. Icasa

== Distrito Federal ==
- Clássico Verde e Amarelo (The Green and Yellow Derby): Brasiliense vs. Gama
- Clássico Candango (from Brasília Derby): Brasília vs. Gama
- Taguatinga derby: Brasiliense vs. Taguatinga

== Espírito Santo ==
- Dérbi Capixaba: Desportiva Ferroviária vs. Rio Branco
- Vi–Rio: Rio Branco vs. Vitória
- Desportiva Ferroviária–Vitória rivalry
- Serra derby: Porto Vitória vs. Serra
- Cachoeiro de Itapemirim derby: Cachoeiro vs. Estrela do Norte

== Goiás ==
- Derby do Cerrado (Cerrado Derby): Goiás vs. Vila Nova
- Atlético Goianiense–Goiânia rivalry
- Atlético Goianiense–Goiás rivalry
- Atlético Goianiense–Vila Nova rivalry
- Anápolis derby: Anapolina vs. Anápolis

== Maranhão ==
- Samará: Maranhão vs. Sampaio Corrêa
- Maremoto: Maranhão vs. Moto Club
- Superclássico Maranhense (Super Derby of Maranhão): Moto Club vs. Sampaio Corrêa

== Mato Grosso ==
- Clássico Vovô (The Grandpa Derby): Dom Bosco vs. Mixto
- Clássico dos Milhões (The Derby of Millions): Mixto vs. Operário Várzea-Grandense
- Clássico da Soja (The Soybean Derby): Luverdense vs. Sorriso

== Mato Grosso do Sul ==
- Comerário: Operário vs. Comercial

== Minas Gerais ==
=== Belo Horizonte derbies ===
- Clássico Mineiro (Minas Gerais Derby): Atlético Mineiro vs. Cruzeiro
- Clássico das Multidões (Crowds Derby): Atlético Mineiro vs. América Mineiro
- Coelho vs. Raposa (Rabbit vs. Fox): América Mineiro vs. Cruzeiro

=== Other cities ===
- Patos de Minas derby or Clássico do Milho (Corn Derby): Mamoré vs. URT
- Juiz de Fora derby or Tu-Tu: Tupi vs. Tupynambás

=== Intercities ===
- Clássico do Triângulo (Triangle derby): Uberaba vs. Uberlândia
- Clássico do Leste de Minas (Eastern Minas derby): Democrata GV vs. Ipatinga

== Pará ==
- Re–Pa: Paysandu vs. Remo
- Paysandu–Tuna Luso rivalry
- Remo–Tuna Luso rivalry
- Santarém derby: São Francisco vs. São Raimundo

== Paraíba ==
- Campina Grande derby or Clássico dos Maiorais (The Greatest Derby): Campinense vs. Treze
- João Pessoa derby or Botauto: Auto Esporte vs. Botafogo da Paraíba
- Botafogo da Paraíba–Campinense rivalry
- Botafogo da Paraíba–Treze rivalry

== Paraná ==
=== Curitiba derbies ===
- Atletiba: Athletico Paranaense vs. Coritiba
- Parático: Athletico Paranaense vs. Paraná
- Paratiba: Coritiba vs. Paraná

=== Intercities ===
- Clássico do Oeste Paranaense (The Western Paraná Derby): FC Cascavel vs. Foz do Iguaçu
- Clássico da Soja (The Soybean Derby): FC Cascavel vs. Toledo
- Clássico do Café (The Coffee Derby): Grêmio Maringá vs. Londrina
- Clássico do Interior (The Countryside Derby): Londrina vs. Operário Ferroviário

== Pernambuco ==
=== Recife derbies ===
- Clássico das Emoções (The Emotions Derby): Náutico vs. Santa Cruz
- Clássico dos Clássicos (The Derby of Derbies): Náutico vs. Sport Recife
- Clássico das Multidões (The Crowds Derby): Santa Cruz vs. Sport Recife
- Clássico da Técnica e Disciplina (The Technique and Discipline Derby): América vs. Náutico
- Clássico da Amizade (The Friendship Derby): América vs. Santa Cruz
- Clássico dos Campeões (The Champions Derby): América vs. Sport Recife

=== Other cities ===
- Cabo de Santo Agostinho derby or Ca–Fé: Cabense vs. Ferroviário do Cabo
- Caruaru derby: Central vs. Porto
- Petrolina derby: 1º de Maio vs. Petrolina
- Vitória de Santo Antão derby: Vera Cruz vs. Vitória
- Pior Clássico do Mundo (Worst Derby in the World): Jaguar vs. Íbis

== Piauí ==
- Rivengo: Flamengo do Piauí vs. River

== Rio de Janeiro ==
=== Derbies between the Big Four ===
- Clássico da Rivalidade (The Rivalry Derby): Botafogo vs. Flamengo
- Clássico Vovô (The Grandpa Derby): Botafogo vs. Fluminense
- Clássico Alvinegro (The Black-and-White Derby): Botafogo vs. Vasco
- Fla–Flu: Flamengo vs. Fluminense
- Clássico dos Milhões (The Derby of Millions): Flamengo vs. Vasco
- Clássico dos Gigantes (The Giants Derby): Fluminense vs. Vasco

=== Other derbies ===
- Clássico da Paz (The Peace Derby): América vs. Vasco
- Campos dos Goytacazes derby or Goyta–Cano: Americano vs. Goytacaz
- Clássico do Sul Fluminense (The South Rio de Janeiro State Derby): Resende vs. Volta Redonda

== Rio Grande do Norte ==
- Natal derby or Clássico-Rei (The Derby-King): ABC vs. América de Natal
- Mossoró derby or Potiba: Baraúnas vs. Potiguar

== Rio Grande do Sul ==
- Porto Alegre derby or Grenal: Grêmio vs. Internacional
- Caxias do Sul derby or Ca–Ju: Caxias vs. Juventude
- Rio Grande derby or Rio–Rita: Rio Grande vs. São Paulo
- Bagé derby or Ba–Gua: Bagé vs. Guarany
- Pelotas derbies:
  - Bra–Far: Brasil de Pelotas vs. Farroupilha
  - Bra–Pel: Brasil de Pelotas vs. Pelotas
  - Far–Pel: Farroupilha vs. Pelotas
- Santa Cruz do Sul derby or Ave–Cruz: Avenida vs. Santa Cruz
- Clássico da Polaneta (The Polenta Derby): Caxias vs. Esportivo
- Santa Maria derby or Rional: Internacional de Santa Maria vs. Riograndense

== Rondônia ==
- Clássico da Vizinhança (The Neighborhood Derby): Ji-Paraná vs. União Cacoalense

== Roraima ==
- Bareima: Atlético Roraima vs. Baré

== Santa Catarina ==
- Florianópolis derby: Avaí vs. Figueirense
- Avaí–Criciúma rivalry
- Avaí–Joinville rivalry
- Criciúma–Figueirense rivalry
- Criciúma–Joinville rivalry
- Figueirense–Joinville rivalry
- Brusque–Metropolitano rivalry

== São Paulo ==
=== Derbies between the Big Four ===
- Dérbi Paulista (from São Paulo Derby): Corinthians vs. Palmeiras
- Clássico Alvinegro (The Black-and-White Derby): Corinthians vs. Santos
- Clássico Majestoso (The Majestic Derby): Corinthians vs. São Paulo
- Clássico da Saudade (The Nostalgia/Good Times Derby): Palmeiras vs. Santos
- Choque-Rei (The Kings Clash): Palmeiras vs. São Paulo
- San–São: Santos vs. São Paulo

=== Cities ===
- Campinas derby or Dérbi Campineiro (from Campinas Derby): Guarani vs. Ponte Preta
- Guarulhos derby: Flamengo-SP vs. Guarulhos
- Mogi das Cruzes derby: Atlético Mogi vs. União Mogi
- Ribeirão Preto derby or Come–Fogo: Botafogo-SP vs. Comercial
- Rio Claro derby: Rio Claro vs. Velo Clube
- Suzano derby: EC União Suzano vs. União Suzano AC
- Assis derby: Assisense vs. VOCEM

=== Intercities ===
- Clássico ABC (The ABC Derby): Santo André vs. São Caetano
- Clássico do Vale da Paraíba (The Paraíba Valley Derby): São José vs. Taubaté
- Paulista–Ponte Preta rivalry
- Itapirense–Mogi Mirim rivalry
- Guaçuano–Mogi Mirim rivalry
- Rio Branco–União Barbarense rivalry

== Sergipe ==
- Aracaju derby: Confiança vs. Sergipe

== Tocantins ==
- Palmas–Tocantinópolis rivalry

== Interstate rivalries ==
- Atlético Mineiro–Flamengo rivalry
- Superclássico do Nordeste (The Northeast Superclassic): Bahia vs. Sport Recife
- Rio de Janeiro–São Paulo football rivalry
