= Clássico do Vale do Paraíba =

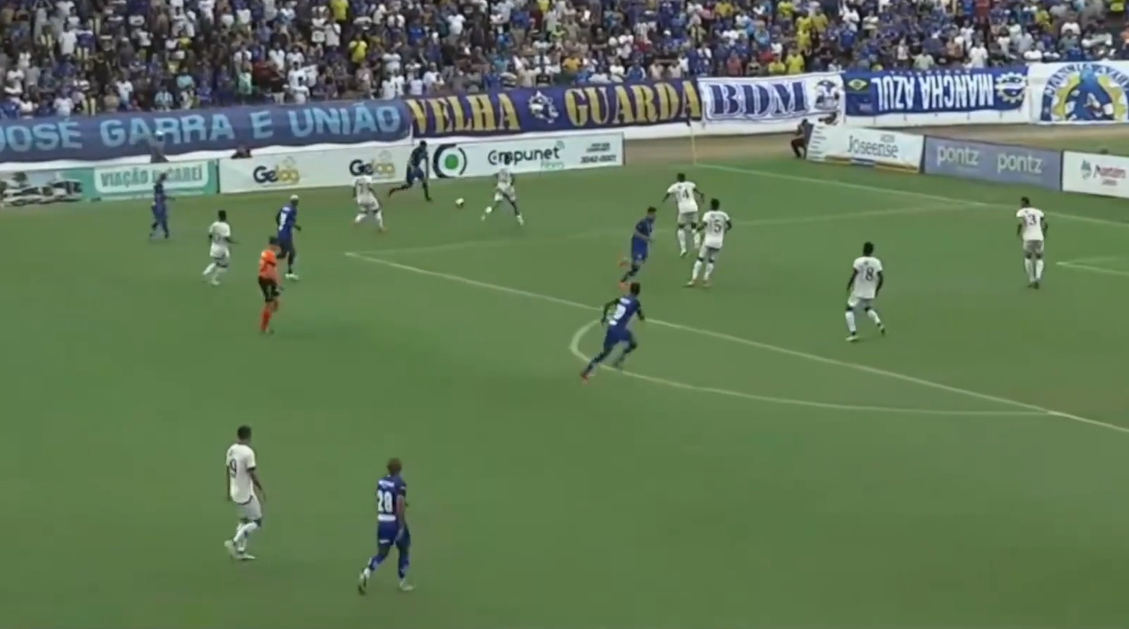
- São José v Taubaté, Campeonato Paulista Série A2, 19 January 2025

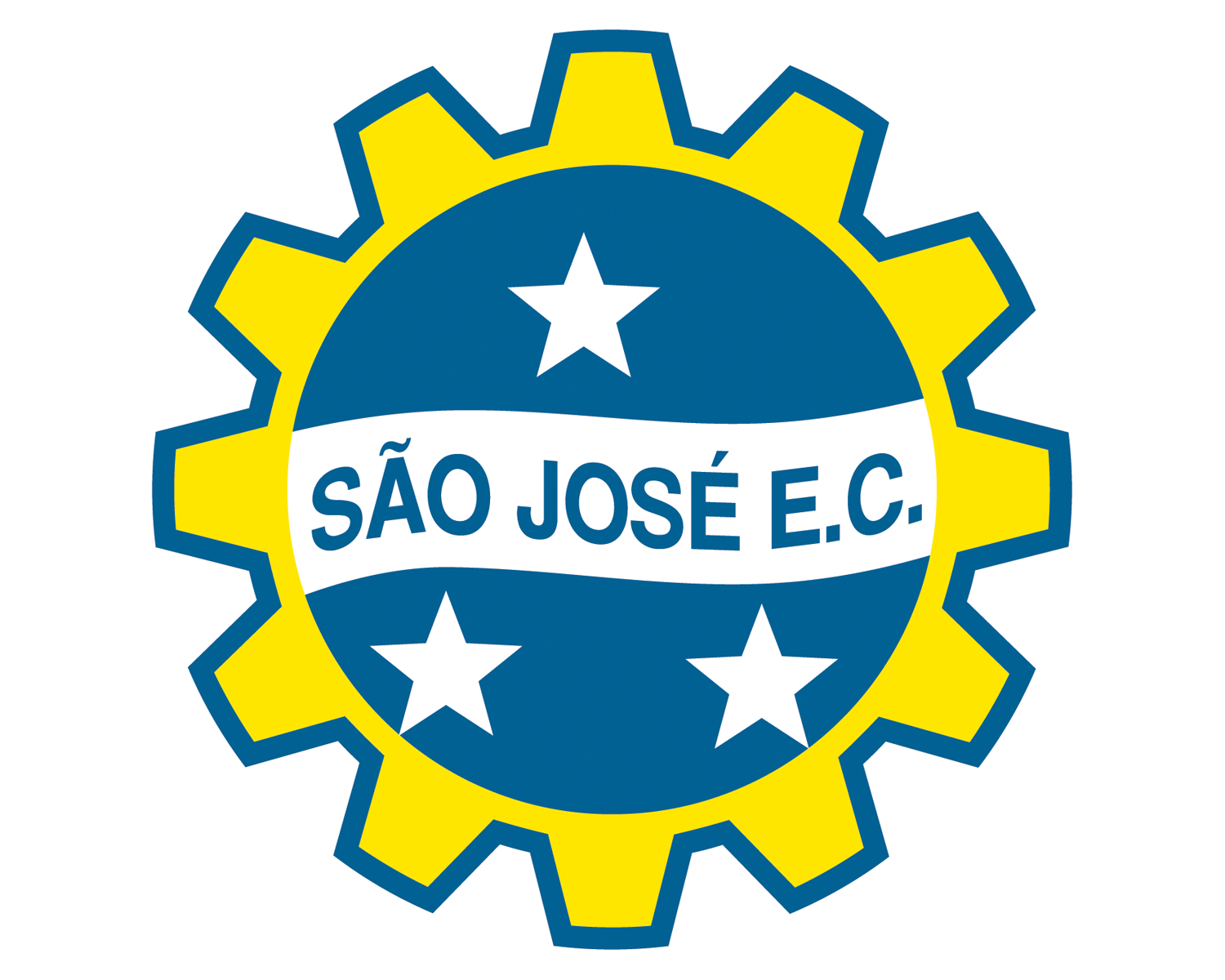
- São José Taubaté
- Other names: Clássico do Vale; Derby do Vale
- Location: Vale do Paraíba
- First meeting: 18 April 1937; Taubaté 5–0 EC São José
- Latest meeting: 6 February 2026; 2026 Campeonato Paulista Série A2; Taubaté 1–2 São José
- Stadiums: Martins Pereira (São José); Joaquinzão (Taubaté)

Statistics
- Total meetings: All matches 89; Professional era 75
- Most wins: All matches Taubaté (32); Professional era São José (26)
- Most player appearances: Cleto (Taubaté); 19 appearances
- All-time series: All matches São José: 28; Drawn: 29; Taubaté: 32; Professional era São José: 26; Drawn: 22; Taubaté: 27
- Largest victory: All matches Taubaté 10–1 São José (1942); Professional era Taubaté 4–1 São José (2004)
- Largest goal scoring: All matches Taubaté 10–1 São José (1942); Professional era Taubaté 4–3 São José (1967); São José 3–4 Taubaté (1981)
- Longest win streak: All matches 5 games Taubaté (1940–1942); Professional era 4 games Taubaté (1964–1965); São José (1976–1977)
- Longest unbeaten streak: All matches 10 games Taubaté (1937–1942); Professional era 8 games São José (2011–2025)
- Current unbeaten streak: 3 games São José (2025–present)

The Clássico do Vale do Paraíba, often referred to as Clássico do Vale, or Derby do Vale, is the name of the derby between São José Esporte Clube and Esporte Clube Taubaté. A traditional Brazilian countryside football rivalry, first disputed in 1937, it is considered the most important derby of the Vale do Paraíba region in the São Paulo state.

São José play at the Estádio Martins Pereira in São José dos Campos, while Taubaté play at the Joaquinzão in Taubaté, neighboring cities of the São Paulo state. The two grounds are separated by approximately 39 km. The teams have played 89 matches in all competitions, including friendlies; Taubaté won 32 matches, while São José won 28, and the remaining 29 have been drawn. Considering only the professional era (São José only officially became a professional team in 1964), 75 matches have been played, with 26 wins from São José, 22 wins from Taubaté, and 27 draws.

== Matches ==
=== Non-professional era ===
São José vs Taubaté
Date	Home team	Score	Away team	Ground	Competition
18 April 1937	Taubaté	5–0	EC São José	Campo do Bosque	Friendly
7 August 1938	EC São José	1–4	Taubaté	Estádio da Rua Antônio Saes	Liga de Futebol Norte
11 October 1938	Taubaté	5–1	EC São José	Campo do Bosque	Liga de Futebol Norte
16 July 1939	Taubaté	6–2	EC São José	Campo do Bosque	Liga de Futebol Norte
24 December 1939	EC São José	5–5	Taubaté	Estádio da Rua Antônio Saes	Liga de Futebol Norte
14 January 1940	Taubaté	4–1	EC São José	Campo do Bosque	Friendly
2 June 1940	Taubaté	7–3	EC São José	Campo do Bosque	Liga de Futebol Norte
22 September 1940	EC São José	1–4	Taubaté	Estádio da Rua Antônio Saes	Liga de Futebol Norte
6 April 1941	EC São José	0–3	Taubaté	Estádio da Rua Antônio Saes	Liga de Futebol Norte
12 April 1942	Taubaté	10–1	EC São José	Campo do Bosque	Friendly (Note: Largest win of the derby's history)
26 April 1942	EC São José	2–1	Taubaté	Estádio da Rua Antônio Saes	Friendly
28 April 1946	Taubaté	7–1	EC São José	Campo do Bosque	Campeonato do Interior
21 July 1946	EC São José	1–0	Taubaté	Estádio da Rua Antônio Saes	Campeonato do Interior

=== Professional era ===
São José vs Taubaté
Date	Home team	Score	Away team	Ground	Competition
1 May 1964	EC São José	1–1	Taubaté	Estádio da Rua Antônio Saes	Friendly
21 June 1964	EC São José	0–2	Taubaté	Estádio da Rua Antônio Saes	Friendly
22 November 1964	EC São José	0–1	Taubaté	Estádio da Rua Antônio Saes	Friendly
25 March 1965	Taubaté	3–0	EC São José	Campo do Bosque	Torneio do Vale
26 May 1965	EC São José	0–3	Taubaté	Estádio da Rua Antônio Saes	Torneio do Vale
20 November 1965	EC São José	2–2	Taubaté	Estádio da Rua Antônio Saes	Friendly
24 November 1965	Taubaté	1–1	EC São José	Campo do Bosque	Friendly
19 March 1966	EC São José	1–0	Taubaté	Estádio da Rua Antônio Saes	Torneio Rui Dória
3 July 1966	EC São José	1–1	Taubaté	Estádio da Rua Antônio Saes	Paulista Primeira Divisão
21 August 1966	Taubaté	1–2	EC São José	Campo do Bosque	Paulista Primeira Divisão
15 February 1967	Taubaté	4–3	EC São José	Campo do Bosque	Torneio do Vale
19 March 1967	EC São José	3–0	Taubaté	Estádio da Rua Antônio Saes	Torneio do Vale
9 July 1967	Taubaté	2–1	EC São José	Campo do Bosque	Paulista Primeira Divisão
15 October 1967	EC São José	1–1	Taubaté	Estádio da Rua Antônio Saes	Paulista Primeira Divisão
13 July 1975	Taubaté	1–1	EC São José	Joaquinzão (Note: First derby of the Joaquinzão stadium)	Friendly
13 March 1976	Taubaté	2–1	EC São José	Joaquinzão	Friendly
25 July 1976	EC São José	1–0	Taubaté	Martins Pereira (Note: First derby of the Martins Pereira stadium)	Paulista Primeira Divisão
17 October 1976	Taubaté	0–1	EC São José	Joaquinzão	Paulista Primeira Divisão
8 May 1977	Taubaté	0–1	São José (Note: Club changed name from Esporte Clube São José to São José Esporte Clube)	Joaquinzão	Paulista Divisão Intermediária
10 July 1977	São José	1–0	Taubaté	Martins Pereira	Paulista Divisão Intermediária
23 April 1978	Taubaté	0–0	São José	Joaquinzão	Paulista Divisão Intermediária
25 June 1978	São José	0–0	Taubaté	Martins Pereira	Paulista Divisão Intermediária
23 July 1978	Taubaté	1–0	São José	Joaquinzão	Paulista Divisão Intermediária
27 August 1978	São José	0–0	Taubaté	Martins Pereira	Paulista Divisão Intermediária
18 March 1979	Taubaté	1–1	São José	Joaquinzão	Friendly
25 March 1979	Taubaté	0–1	São José	Joaquinzão	Friendly
11 July 1979	Taubaté	0–2	São José	Joaquinzão	Paulista Divisão Intermediária
9 September 1979	São José	0–0	Taubaté	Martins Pereira	Paulista Divisão Intermediária
23 September 1979	São José	0–0	Taubaté	Martins Pereira	Troféu Imprensa
18 November 1979	Taubaté	0–0	São José	Joaquinzão	Paulista Divisão Intermediária
29 November 1979	São José	1–2	Taubaté	Palestra Itália	Paulista Divisão Intermediária
1 February 1981	São José	2–0	Taubaté	Martins Pereira	Taça de Bronze
8 February 1981	Taubaté	2–0	São José	Joaquinzão	Taça de Bronze
11 March 1981	São José	0–0	Taubaté	Martins Pereira	Torneio Nabi Abi Chedid
28 March 1981	Taubaté	0–1	São José	Joaquinzão	Torneio Nabi Abi Chedid
5 July 1981	São José	3–4	Taubaté	Martins Pereira	Paulista Primeira Divisão (Note: First derby in the top tier of the São Paulo state league)
18 October 1981	Taubaté	0–1	São José	Joaquinzão	Paulista Primeira Divisão
5 September 1982	São José	0–1	Taubaté	Martins Pereira	Paulista Primeira Divisão
7 November 1982	Taubaté	1–0	São José	Joaquinzão	Paulista Primeira Divisão
20 March 1983	Taubaté	1–2	São José	Joaquinzão	Copa Vale do Paraíba
1 May 1983	São José	1–1	Taubaté	Martins Pereira	Copa Vale do Paraíba
10 July 1983	São José	1–0	Taubaté	Martins Pereira	Paulista Primeira Divisão
9 October 1983	Taubaté	0–0	São José	Joaquinzão	Paulista Primeira Divisão
1 February 1984	Taubaté	0–0	São José	Joaquinzão	Seletiva Paulista Taça CBF
11 February 1984	São José	0–0	Taubaté	Martins Pereira	Seletiva Paulista Taça CBF
6 February 1985	Taubaté	1–2	São José	Joaquinzão	Copa 50 Anos da FPF
16 February 1985	São José	1–1	Taubaté	Martins Pereira	Copa 50 Anos da FPF
23 March 1985	São José	0–0	Taubaté	Martins Pereira	Copa Vale do Paraíba
14 July 1985	Taubaté	1–0	São José	Joaquinzão	Paulista Segunda Divisão
13 October 1985	São José	1–2	Taubaté	Martins Pereira	Paulista Segunda Divisão
23 March 1986	São José	0–0	Taubaté	Martins Pereira	Copa Vale do Paraíba
17 August 1986	São José	1–0	Taubaté	Martins Pereira	Paulista Segunda Divisão
5 October 1986	Taubaté	2–0	São José	Joaquinzão	Paulista Segunda Divisão
17 May 1987	Taubaté	0–1	São José	Joaquinzão	Paulista Segunda Divisão
5 July 1987	São José	0–1	Taubaté	Martins Pereira	Paulista Segunda Divisão
31 May 1989	São José	2–0	Taubaté	Martins Pereira	Friendly
6 March 1991	São José	0–0	Taubaté	Martins Pereira	Friendly
24 January 1996	Taubaté	0–2	São José	Joaquinzão	Copa Vale do Paraíba
3 October 1999	Taubaté	3–2	São José	Joaquinzão	Copa Estado de São Paulo
24 October 1999	São José	1–3	Taubaté	Martins Pereira	Copa Estado de São Paulo
15 February 2004	São José	1–0	Taubaté	Martins Pereira	Paulista Série A2
20 March 2004	Taubaté	4–1	São José	Joaquinzão	Paulista Série A2 (Note: Largest win of the professional era)
4 February 2007	Taubaté	2–2	São José	Joaquinzão	Paulista Série A2
4 August 2011	Taubaté	1–0	São José	Joaquinzão	Copa Paulista
14 September 2011	São José	2–1	Taubaté	Martins Pereira	Copa Paulista
15 January 2012	Taubaté	2–2	São José	Joaquinzão	Copa Vale do Paraíba
30 July 2014	Taubaté	1–2	São José	Joaquinzão	Copa Paulista
3 September 2014	São José	0–0	Taubaté	Martins Pereira	Copa Paulista
22 February 2015	Taubaté	1–1	São José	Joaquinzão	Paulista Série A3
21 February 2024	Taubaté	0–0	São José	Joaquinzão	Paulista Série A2
19 January 2025	São José	3–0	Taubaté	Martins Pereira	Paulista Série A2
15 March 2025	São José	0–0	Taubaté	Martins Pereira	Paulista Série A2
19 March 2025	Taubaté	1–0	São José	Joaquinzão	Paulista Série A2
15 June 2025	São José	2–0	Taubaté	Martins Pereira	Copa Paulista
20 July 2025	Taubaté	0–2	São José	Joaquinzão	Copa Paulista
6 February 2026	Taubaté	1–2	São José	Joaquinzão	Paulista Série A2

== Statistics ==
=== Non-professional era ===
As of 7 February 2026

Competition	Played	São José	Draw	Taubaté	São José goals	Taubaté goals
Liga de Futebol Norte	7	0	1	6	13	34
Campeonato do Interior	2	1	0	1	2	8
Other friendlies	4	1	0	3	4	20
Total	13	2	1	10	19	62

=== Professional era ===
As of 7 February 2026

Competition	Played	São José	Draw	Taubaté	São José goals	Taubaté goals
Campeonato Paulista	6	2	1	3	5	6
Campeonato Paulista Série A2	30	11	10	9	24	22
Campeonato Paulista Série A3	1	0	1	0	1	1
Copa Paulista	10	5	2	3	14	11
Other tournaments	28	8	13	7	27	27
Total	75	26	27	22	71	67

=== All official matches ===
As of 7 February 2026

Competition	Played	São José	Draw	Taubaté	São José goals	Taubaté goals
Campeonato Paulista	6	2	1	3	5	6
Campeonato Paulista Série A2	30	11	10	9	24	22
Campeonato Paulista Série A3	1	0	1	0	1	1
Copa Paulista	10	5	2	3	14	11
Total	47	18	14	15	44	40
