= Placar Linhas Aéreas =

Brazilian airline

IATA	ICAO	Call sign
PL	PLS	PLACAR
- Founded: October 5, 2022; 3 years ago
- AOC #: 17,665 - August 12, 2025
- Hubs: Bertram Luiz Leupolz Airport
- Secondary hubs: São Paulo Guarulhos International Airport
- Fleet size: 1
- Headquarters: São Paulo, Brazil
- Key people: Leila Mejdalani Pereira (Founder); Jose Roberto Lamacchia (Founder)

Placar Linhas Aéreas is a Brazilian non-scheduled passenger and cargo airline, founded in 2022 and headquartered in São Paulo, Brazil. It received its first plane and began operations in 2023, focusing on transporting football teams to play local matches in Brazil and also in other countries in South America.

== History ==
=== Establishment ===
Placar Linhas Aéreas was founded on October 5, 2022, by José Roberto Lamacchia and Leila Mejdalani Pereira, his wife, the fourth richest woman in Brazil in Forbes' The World's Billionaires ranking, and president of the Sociedade Esportiva Palmeiras Football Club. The business couple owns Crefisa, one of the largest personal credit companies founded in 1964.

=== Background ===
Pereira is best known for being, since 2021, the president of Sociedade Esportiva Palmeiras, a professional football team in the Campeonato Brasileiro Série A, becoming the first woman to hold this position in the team's history and at the top of the Brazilian football league system. And it was precisely because she headed a football team that, thinking about Palmeiras' travel logistics and the setbacks the team faced, that Pereira decided to create an airline not only to serve her own team, but to offer other football teams another option to travel to matches in Brazil and South America.

On January 30, 2023, during a meeting of the Palmeiras' Deliberative Council, Leila informed the team's advisors that she bought the first plane for Placar Linhas Aéreas, an Embraer E-Jet E2, which would be available to transport the players and the entire Palmeiras technical team to matches. The announcement generated questions from fans and other members of the team's council who oppose her presidency, mainly about the costs of the plane and the financial viability of its operation, with Leila clarifying to the press that the plane is hers and that Palmeiras I wouldn't pay to use it.

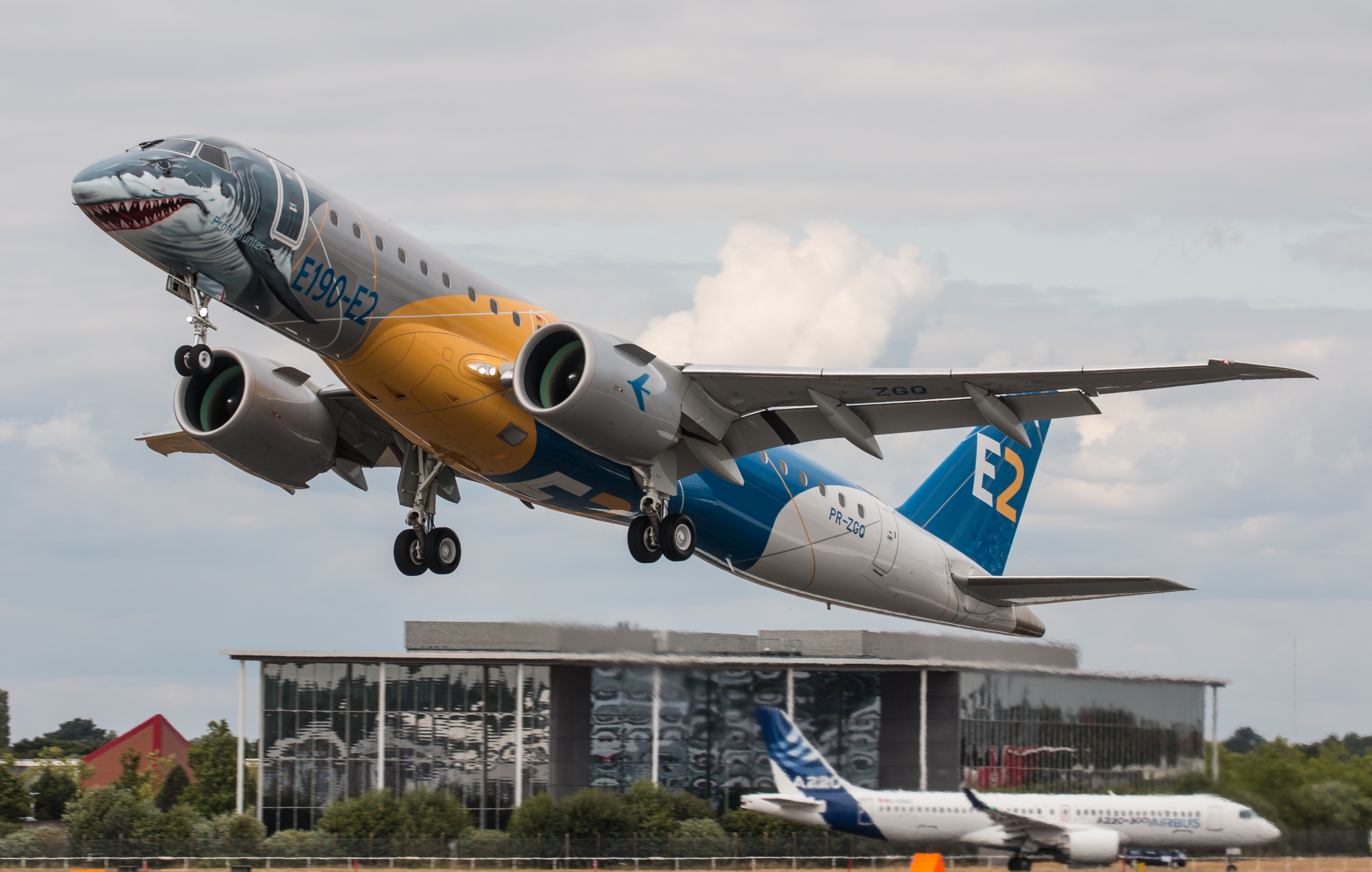
Embraer E190-E2 Demonstrator at the Farnborough International Airshow

On February 18, 2023, through a publication on her account on the social network Instagram, Leila Pereira revealed that Placar's first plane would be an Embraer E190-E2 (MSN 19020015) purchased directly from Embraer. The plane was part of an order from Chinese airline Fuzhou Airlines, however, the company canceled the order. It was later temporarily leased to the Norwegian Widerøe and returned to the manufacturer, receiving the special Profit Hunter Tech Shark livery and being used as a demonstrator aircraft. At the time of acquisition, the aircraft was stored at the headquarters of Embraer's Portuguese subsidiary, OGMA, in Alverca, Portugal.

After being prepared in Portugal and receiving Placar's colors, the E190-E2 was transferred to the airline's operations base at Bertram Luiz Leupolz Airport in Sorocaba, São Paulo.

On June 27, 2023, it was officially delivered by Embraer to the airline in a ceremony at the Brazilian manufacturer's headquarters in São José dos Campos. Placar's first plane received the Brazilian aeronautical registration PS-LMP, the initials of its founder, Leila Mejdalani Pereira.

=== First years (2023–present) ===
Placar's first flight took place on August 4, 2023, transporting the Palmeiras delegation from Sorocaba to Galeão International Airport in Rio de Janeiro. On August 18, the plane was used again by Palmeiras, this time to fly to Marechal Rondon International Airport in Cuiabá, Mato Grosso.

On August 21, 2023, made its international debut, once again transporting the team's delegation, between São Paulo Guarulhos International Airport and Matecaña International Airport, in Pereira, Colombia. Upon returning to Brazil, on August 24 the plane presented a technical problem with one of the Pratt & Whitney PW1000G engines, preventing it from taking off from Pereira and forcing the Palmeiras delegation to resort to chartering a Boeing 737 MAX 8 from GOL Linhas Aéreas, paid for by Leila Pereira herself, owner of Placar Linhas Aéreas and president of the football team.

==== Pratt & Whitney PW1000G technical issues and grounded plane ====
On August 28, 2023, after resolving the engine issue, the Placar Linhas Aéreas E190-E2 finally returned to Brazil, landing in São Paulo Guarulhos and later flying to its base in Sorocaba, fulfilling the team's entire matches schedule for more than a month. On September 26, it was used again for an international flight, this time towards the Argentine capital Buenos Aires.

The plane continued to fly until October 25, 2023, when it took off from São Paulo to Fort Lauderdale, Florida and later to Middle Georgia Regional Airport in Macon, Georgia, where the Embraer Aircraft Maintenance Services (MRO) is located in the United States.

According to the Brazilian press, the reason for the transfer for maintenance in the United States is related to technical issues with Pratt & Whitney engines that globally affect the fleet of several models, such as the Airbus A220, Airbus A320neo and the Embraer E-Jet E2 family. The problem was caused by contamination of a metallic powder used in the manufacture of engine parts, such as high-pressure turbine discs and high-pressure compressor discs.

On January 18, 2024, Leila Pereira assured that the plane should return to Brazil very soon, ensuring that Palmeiras' logistics will be assured for the 2024 match season, which will begin on April 14. And while it is not being used by Palmeiras, the plane will be available to be chartered by other football teams, travel agencies, among other clients.

On April 29, 2024, after six months on the ground undergoing maintenance in the United States, the E190-E2 registration PS-LMP returned to Brazil, flying between Macon, Fort Lauderdale and Manaus, from where it will continue on April 30 to the base of Placar Linhas Aéreas operations in Sorocaba. The expectation is that the plane will return to transport the Palmeiras team in the coming weeks.

==== Future ====
On February 17, 2024, the website Nosso Palestra, linked to Palmeiras, revealed that the businesswoman and president of the team acquired a second Embraer E190-E2 for Placar Linhas Aéreas. The plane in question would be the E-Jet E2 registration PR-ERQ (MSN 19020016), also canceled by Fuzhou Airlines and which has been at the manufacturer's headquarters in São José dos Campos since 2021 waiting for a future customer, as other potential customers, such as Somon Air, Congo Airways and Madagascar Airlines, also rejected it.

It would be undergoing an interior reconfiguration for a 98-seat layout and delivery should take place in March, the publication indicated, citing sources close to the airline. Also according to the website, the other plane that has been undergoing maintenance in the United States since October 2023 due to engine problems, is awaiting clearance to return to Brazil.

On November 11, 2024, Nosso Palestra reported that Placar Linhas Aéreas' second aircraft, which has been undergoing maintenance for six months in Macon, Georgia, United States, is awaiting authorization from the National Civil Aviation Agency of Brazil (ANAC) to return to Brazil and join the airline's fleet, with the Brazilian aeronautical registration PS-YVL.

== Fleet ==
As of August 2025, Placar Linhas Aéreas operates the following aircraft:

Aircraft	In service	Orders	Passengers	Notes
Embraer 190-E2	1	—	98	Reg. PS-YVL std in Macon
Total	1	—		

== See also ==
- List of airlines of Brazil
