= Rio de Janeiro–São Paulo football rivalry =

The Rio de Janeiro–São Paulo football rivalry is the rivalry between football clubs, fans and media in the states of Rio de Janeiro and São Paulo, as well as their capitals. The rivalry occurs because they are the two most economically developed Brazilian states and most successful states in Brazilian football. Together, the two states have 51 of the 68 national league titles and 17 of the 35 Copa do Brasil titles, in addition to 15 of the 23 Brazilian trophies in the Copa Libertadores.

In the context of clubs, the rivalry is most intense when it involves eight of the twelve major Brazilian clubs that represent these states, namely the Rio de Janeiro's Big Four (Botafogo, Flamengo, Fluminense and Vasco da Gama) and the São Paulo's Big Four (Corinthians, Palmeiras, Santos and São Paulo), which dates back to the time of the old Torneio Rio–São Paulo. Fans and the media often debate and discuss which is the best football at the moment and which is the best state league, Campeonato Carioca or Campeonato Paulista.

== Relations between clubs ==
The clubs from Rio de Janeiro and São Paulo have some friendly and some conflicting relations between them, as they compete annually in the Campeonato Brasileiro Série A and usually fight for the title or positions in the table.

=== Botafogo and Palmeiras ===
The rivalry between the two intensified in 2023, during the term of the president of Palmeiras, Leila Pereira, and the arrival of the owner of SAF from Botafogo, John Textor. The occasion occurred after Botafogo lost the 2023 Campeonato Brasileiro Série A after opening a large lead over second place during the season. Palmeiras managed to overcome Botafogo's points and became champions. Textor denounced an alleged manipulation of results that would have benefited Palmeiras, but without presenting concrete evidence, just videos and reports generated by a company hired by him to analyze the championship. The case was taken to a Parliamentary Inquiry Commission for investigation, and Palmeiras president came to an accuser as saying Textor was "irresponsible and criminal" and calling him a "disgrace to Brazilian football". In the midst of all this, Botafogo and Palmeiras were drawn to beat each other in the round of 16 of the 2024 Copa Libertadores, which also increased the rivalry among fans.

=== Botafogo and Santos ===
The rivalry between Botafogo and Santos dates back to the 60s, when it was treated as the biggest rivalry in the country, since Botafogo had Garrincha and Santo had Pelé, the two greatest players of the time. Pelé and Garrincha would be the Brazilian stars in winning the 1958 and 1962 FIFA World Cups. The two clubs have already competed for the Campeonato Brasileiro Série A title in 1962 and 1995, with one victory each.

=== Corinthians and Flamengo ===
Corinthians and Flamengo represent the two biggest fans of Brazilian football. Although data points to Flamengo's fans being bigger with 21,5% of Brazilian supporters, Corinthians fans disagree and believe that Corinthians fans, in addition to being more passionate, are bigger in terms of the number of fans who only support a single club. On some occasions, the two fans have come together against their other rivals.

=== Corinthians and Fluminense ===
Historical facts mark the dispute between the two clubs, such as the semi-final of the 1976 Campeonato Brasileiro Série A, when thousands of Corinthians fans traveled from São Paulo to Rio de Janeiro to fill the Maracanã, reaching a total audience of more than 160,000 spectators, in what became known as the Invasão Corintiana (Corinthians invasion). On August 17, 2024, the rivalry was named Clássico Silvio Santos (Silvio Santos Derby), in honor of the Brazilian televisão host of the same name who died on the same day and was a supporter of both clubs.

=== Corinthians and Vasco da Gama ===
The rivalry between Corinthians and Vasco is marked by several decisive disputes between the two teams, as they have been in good times at the same time throughout history. The two clubs together won four consecutive editions of the Campeonato Brasileiro Série A between 1997 and 2000, with two titles each, after consecutively winning the 1989 and 1990 editions. The most important match between them was the 2000 FIFA Club World Cup final. They are the only two teams from around the world to have played in a world championship final between clubs from the same country and continent. The two fans are usually considered the loudest and most faithful in Brazilian football, which usually causes animosity and violence when they face each other.

=== Flamengo and Palmeiras ===
Flamengo and Palmeiras are perhaps the biggest interstate rivalry in recent years. Since 2018, the two clubs have won the most titles and usually compete for them almost every year, as was the case in the 2021 Copa Libertadores final. As clubs assumed prominence as economic powers in Brazil, they also dominated the top of competitions in the country, accumulating titles, personal disputes and allowing an interstate rivalry to emerge for the status of Brazil's biggest club. The rivalry also passed on to the directors of the two clubs, with recurring episodes regardless of who is in charge of management.

=== Palmeiras and Vasco da Gama ===
The relationship between Palmeiras and Vasco draws attention due to the history of unity and respect among fans, built over the years. The organized fans of the two clubs usually hold a get-together before the game between them, in a peaceful and friendly atmosphere. The respectful relationship between the fans also passed on to players and managers of both clubs.

=== Santos and Vasco da Gama ===
Some Vasco fans often taunt Santos fans by pointing out that Pelé stated in numerous interviews that he was a Vasco da Gama supporter. However, the rivalry between the two clubs truly began in 2023, when a stadium announcer at Vila Belmiro provoked the visiting team while announcing them before a Campeonato Brasileiro Série A match between Santos and Vasco. During that same game, Santos' Yeferson Soteldo stood on the ball with both feet to waste time, sparking a mass brawl between the two teams on the pitch. At the end of the season, Santos was relegated while Vasco managed to avoid the drop in the final round, with Vasco's players standing on top of the ball to taunt Santos.

On 17 April 2025, Philippe Coutinho's Vasco defeated Neymar's Santos 6–0, the biggest margin of victory in the fixture's history. This sparked a great deal of taunting among the fans. In 18 February 2026, Coutinho requested the termination of his contract with Vasco, citing "mental health issues". In September, he was announced as a Santos player, a move driven by Neymar. This led a large portion of the Vasco fanbase to label him a "Judas".

== See also ==
- G-12 (Brazilian football)
- List of Brazilian football derbies
