= Embraer E-Jet E2 family =

Regional jet airliner family

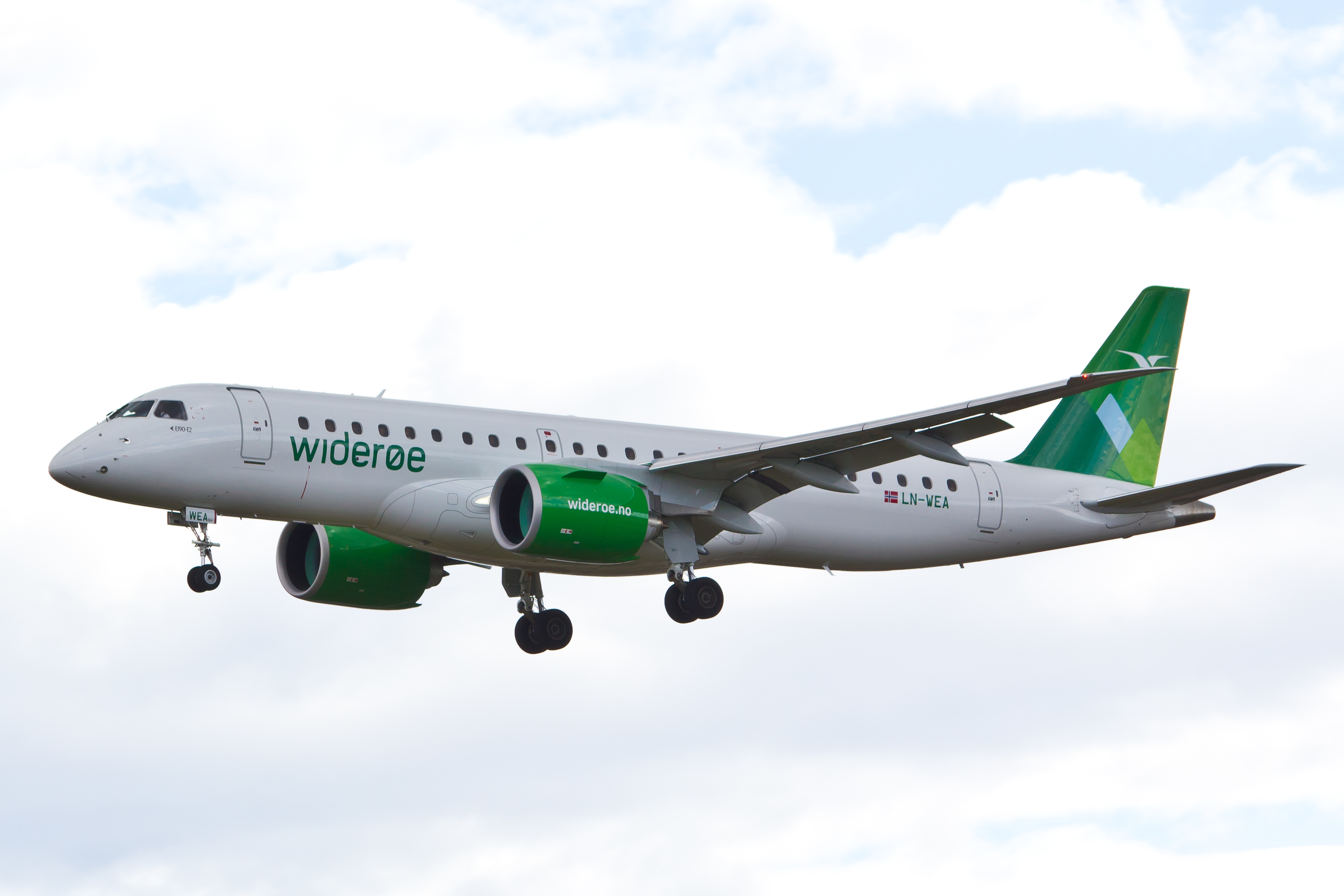
- An E190-E2 of Widerøe, its launch operator

General information
- Type: Regional jet Narrow-body airliner
- National origin: Brazil
- Manufacturer: Embraer
- Status: In service
- Primary users: Porter Airlines Azul Brazilian Airlines; KLM Cityhopper; Helvetic Airways
- Number built: 224 as of Q3 2026

History
- Manufactured: 2016–present
- Introduction date: 24 April 2018 with Widerøe
- First flight: 23 May 2016
- Developed from: Embraer E-Jet family

The Embraer E-Jet E2 family is a series of four-abreast narrow-body regional jet airliners designed and produced by the Brazilian aircraft manufacturer Embraer. The twinjet is an incremental development of the original E-Jet family, adopting the more fuel-efficient Pratt & Whitney PW1900G, a geared turbofan engine. The aircraft family comprises three variants that share the same fuselage cross-section with different lengths and feature three different redesigned wings, fly-by-wire controls with new avionics, and an updated cabin. The variants offer maximum take-off weights from 44.6 to 62.5 t (98,000 to 138,000 lb), and cover a range of 2,000–3,000 nmi (3,700–5,600 km; 2,300–3,500 mi).

The program was launched at the Paris Air Show in June 2013. The first variant, the E190-E2, made its maiden flight on 23 May 2016 and flight testing proceeded to schedule with little issue. It received certification on 28 February 2018 before entering service with launch customer Widerøe on 24 April. Certification of the larger E195-E2 was received during April 2019; Azul Brazilian Airlines was the first airline to operate this model. The smaller E175-E2 was originally set to be delivered in 2021, but has been delayed past 2027 due to a lack of demand. Regional airlines in the United States were a major customer of the first-generation of E-Jets, however scope clause agreements have prevented them from purchasing the heavier E175-E2.

The E-190 E2 and E-195 E2 variants compete with the Airbus A220 family aircraft, particularly its smaller A220-100 variant. As of October 2026, a total of 540 E-Jet E2s have been ordered with 224 delivered and in commercial service.

== Development ==
=== Background ===
During the early 2010s, the regional jets segment of the international airliner market grew more competitive with the announcement of the Airbus A320neo and the Boeing 737 MAX, thus it was thought that Embraer would have to respond or else lose the competitiveness of the E-Jet family through inaction. In 2010, Embraer was reportedly considering directly challenging the Bombardier CSeries (now A220) by developing a clean-sheet five-abreast airliner for 100 to 150 passengers. The alternative option was to somehow improve the E-Jet family to maintain its attractiveness to customers.

In November 2011, Embraer announced at the Dubai Air Show that it had committed to developing new generation of its E-Jet family. This option was both lower risk and lower cost than pursuing a clean sheet design. At the time, Embraer reportedly foresaw a demand for 6,400 commercial jets with capacity of up to 130 seats over the following 20 years. The smallest of the new variants, the E-175-E2, seats up to 88 passengers in a single class configuration, the medium-sized E-190-E2 seats up to 120 passengers, while the largest model, the E-195-E2 seats up to 150 passengers. During the late 2000s, Embraer had studied an aircraft of such capacity, dubbed the E-195X, but had discarded the concept in 2010 in light of degraded aircraft performance in the absence of a re-engine. On account of its poor sales and decreasing demand for 70 seat jets, a redesigned counterpart to the E-170 was not pursued.

One key feature of these new variants would be more efficient engines with larger diameter fans; several large engine manufacturers, GE Aviation, Pratt & Whitney, and Rolls-Royce, were all evaluated by Embraer as possible suppliers. During January 2013, it was announced the Pratt & Whitney PW1000G, a geared turbofan, had been selected to be the exclusive engine of the E2. Embraer commercial aircraft president Paulo Cesar de Souza e Silva noted that the PW1000G was the best suited engine for the performance sought by customers. The selection of the PW1000G is likely to have been eased by the parallel development of the smaller PW1200G engine for the Mitsubishi Regional Jet as well as the larger and more mature PW1500G for the Airbus A220.

The E2 family made various improvements in its performance, such as a reduced specific fuel consumption, lower emissions and noise output, minimised maintenance costs, along with the use of a new aluminum or carbon fiber-based wing. These wings had a higher aspect ratio, a longer wingspan, and were equipped with raked wingtips instead of winglets. In early 2013, Embraer referred to this project as being "the E-jets second generation". During June 2013, the $1.7 billion program was launched at the Paris Air Show, citing strong customer demand.

The development programme made extensive use of digital model simulations and static test rigs, enabling rapid progress to be made early on. By May 2016, less than three years after being launched, the E2 had 640 commitments from various airlines and leasing companies, 267 of which were firm orders while 373 were options and purchase rights.

=== Flight testing ===
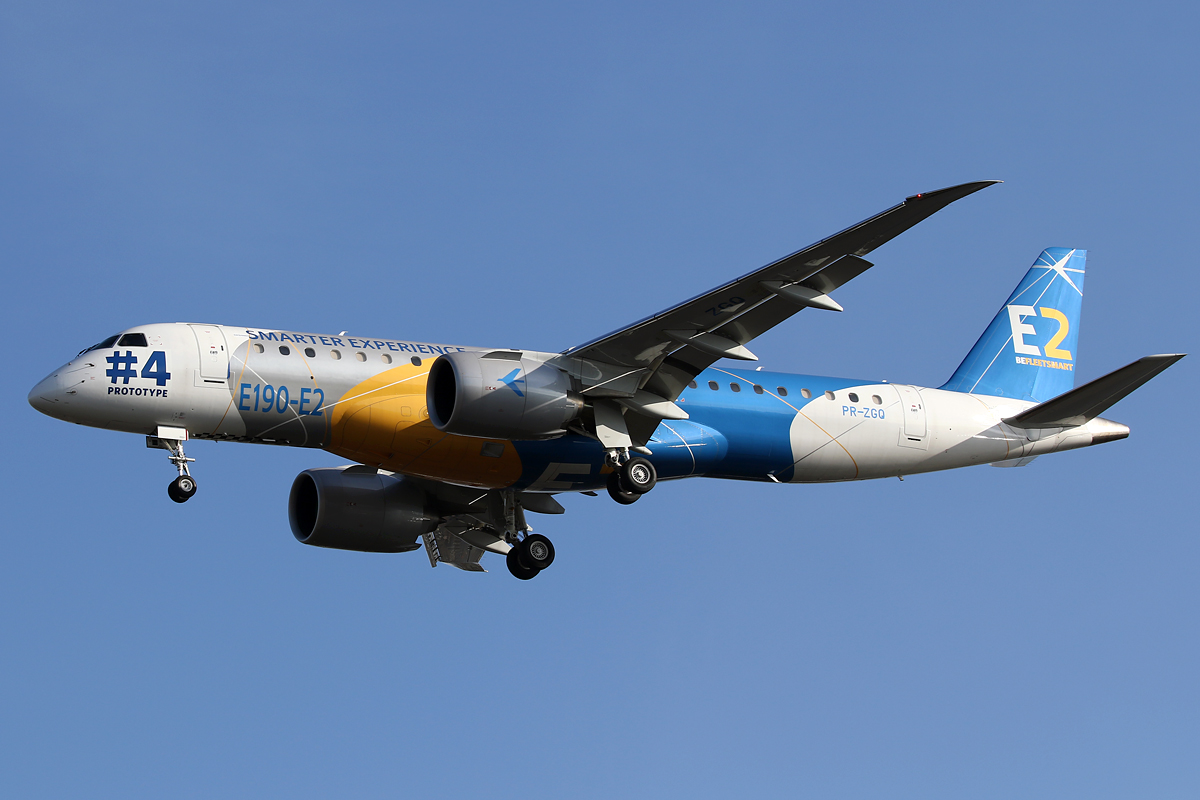
An E190-E2 prototype, the E190-E2 made its maiden flight on 23 May 2016 and was type certificated on 28 February 2018.

On 25 February 2016, the first E-Jet E2, an E190-E2, was rolled out. It performed its maiden flight from São José dos Campos on 23 May 2016, three months ahead of schedule. It flew for three hours and twenty minutes to Mach 0.82, climbed to 12,000 metres (41,000 ft), retracted the landing gear and flaps, and engaged the fly-by-wire in normal mode. It flew earlier than the previously anticipated second half of 2016. The program had fewer challenges than expected and introduction was then planned in the first quarter of 2018. The airplane was slightly below expected weight and the other two E190-E2 prototypes flew within a year.

On 8 July 2016, the second prototype made its maiden flight; this initial flight lasted two hours and 55 minutes and was incident-free. The first E-Jet E2 flew from Brazil to Farnborough Airshow just 45 days after its maiden flight, demonstrating maturity and confidence in the design. By April 2017, 650 hours of flight tests had been completed and the program was reportedly on schedule. Embraer sought to guarantee a 99% schedule reliability in the first year of service. By June 2017, half of the flight testing had been completed; the aerodynamics were reportedly better than predicted and the E190-E2 hot and high performance was also better than anticipated.

The E195-E2's MTOW increased to 61,500 kg (135,600 lb) and its range to 2,600 nmi (3,000 mi; 4,800 km). In June 2017, the four E190-E2s and the single E195-E2 - which was presented at the 2017 Paris Air Show - had made more than 900 flight-test hours, mostly by the E190-E2s. In July 2017, the five aircraft had flown 1,000 flight-test hours while the E190-E2 had accomplished 55% of its test campaign. In January 2018, 98% of the test campaign was completed with 2,000 flight hours. Fuel burn was 17.3% lower than for the E190, up from 16% predicted, while range had increased by 750 nmi (860 mi; 1,390 km) from hot-and-high or short runways: 1,600 or 2,200 nmi (1,800 or 2,500 mi; 3,000 or 4,100 km) from Mexico City or London City, and noise margin to Stage 4 was 3 EPNdB better than specification at 20 EPNdB.

On 28 February 2018, the E190-E2 received its type certificate from the National Civil Aviation Agency of Brazil (ANAC), Federal Aviation Administration (FAA) and European Union Aviation Safety Agency (EASA). The first production engines for the larger variant were delivered in February 2019 and should deliver a 24% reduction in per-seat fuel burn compared with the E195. The E195-E2 obtained its type certification in April 2019.

=== Production ===
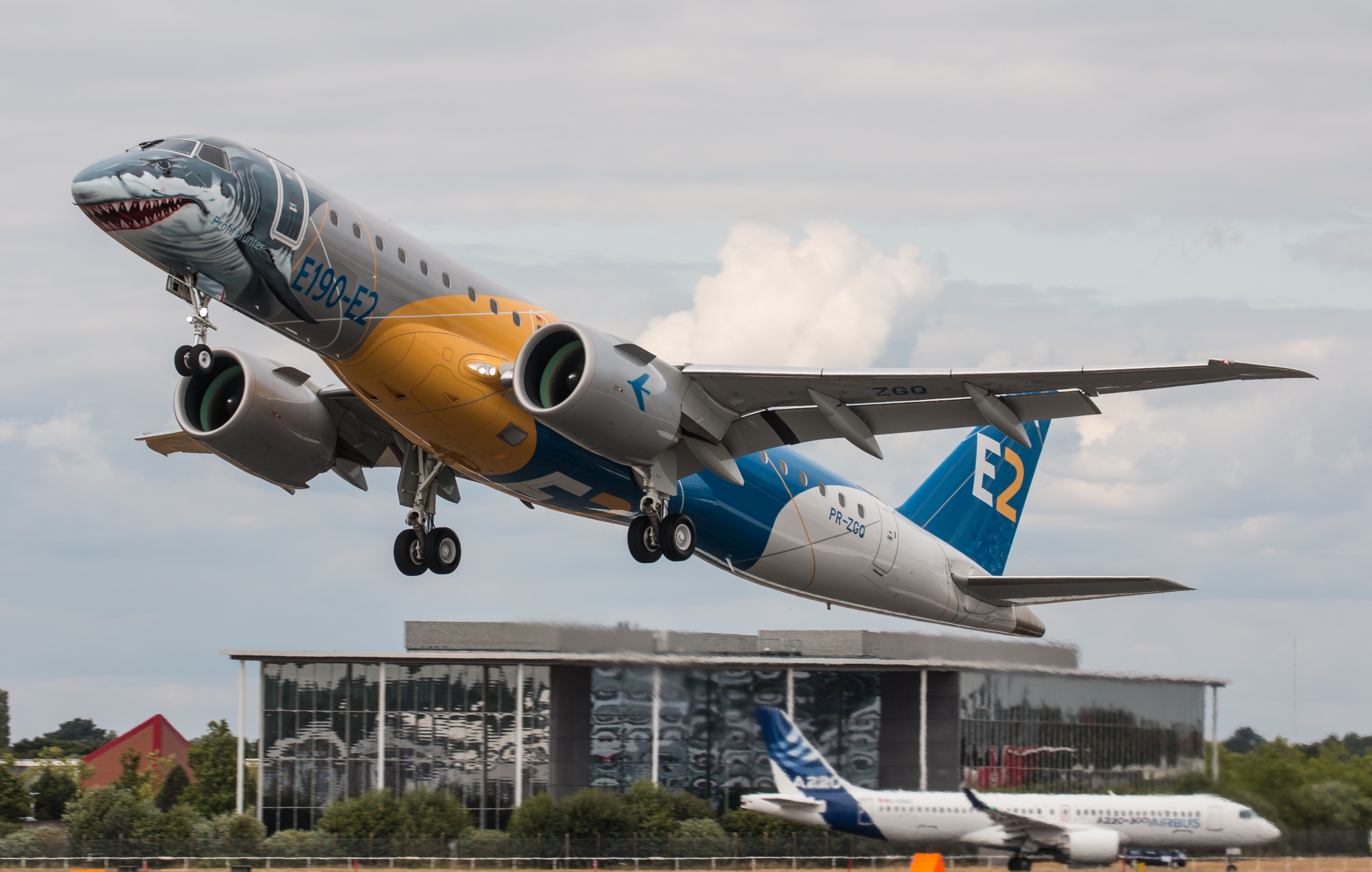
The E-Jet E2 competes with the Airbus A220 in the background.

Inspired by the automotive industry's production of multiple models on the same line, Embraer proposed building the E190/195-E2 alongside the original E175/190/195 at a steady rate of eight aircraft per month by the end of 2018. Production of the original E-Jet family was projected to slow if assembly of the E175-E2 had started in 2021. As Embraer transitioned from its previous E-jets to the upgraded E2, it was expecting to deliver 85-95 airliners in 2018 with a negative $150 million free cash flow, less than in 2017 with 78 deliveries in the first nine months with a cash outflow of $700 million: return to profitability will take at least three years once the program investment is reduced and the production ramp up is complete. Hybrid stations capable of work on either the E1 or E2 were more automated, moving to 90% automated drilling and riveting for the E2 wing.

Elements such as the cabin were examined from a production standpoint relatively early in the design process, which included the involvement of external suppliers as well. Embraer opted for a sole-source solution for the cabin; this approach reportedly enabled more aggressive deals to be secured from key suppliers and thus lowering costs while also easing integration by reducing the number of suppliers involved.

In November 2017, the E2 was forecast to account for 10% of Embraer's airliner deliveries in 2018 ahead of a planned rise in 2019. Embraer thought Airbus would not be able to lower the A220 supply chain costs enough to make it profitable and viewed the A220 as a heavy, expensive and long-range aircraft. Embraer hoped the E2's operational capabilities would win a majority of the market share as commitments were hoped to follow certification and entry into service. Embraer delivered 101 airliners in 2017, down from 162 in 2008, but targeted delivering 14 E2 monthly or even 16 or 18. Throughout 2022, Embraer worked to ramp production at its São José dos Campos facility, hiring Toyota to help improve efficiency on the E-Jet line using lessons from the Toyota Production System. During the fourth quarter of that year, deliveries surged to 80 aircraft, pushing Embraer's full-year deliveries to 159, up from 141 delivered in 2021.

=== Introduction ===
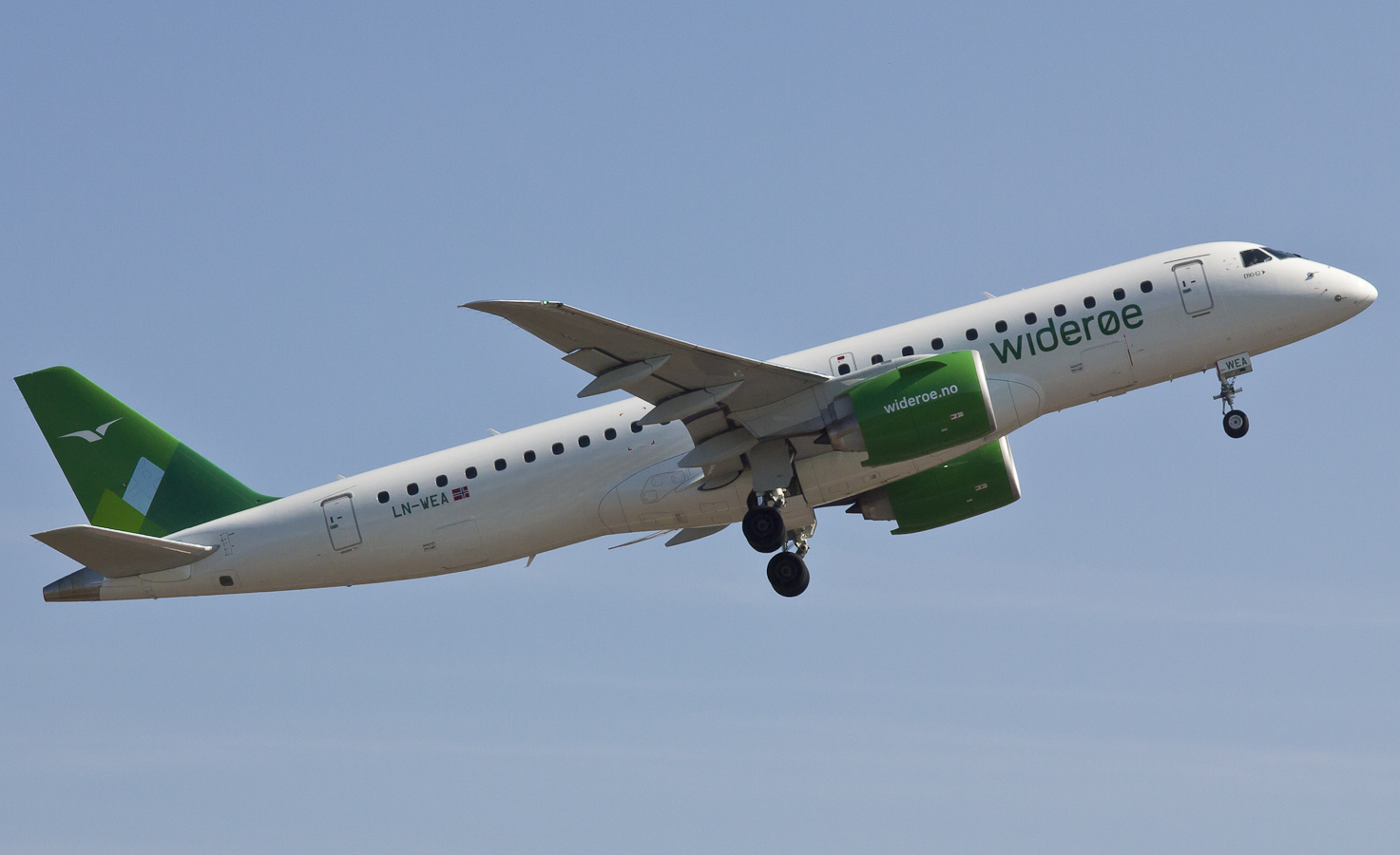
A Widerøe E190-E2. The variant was introduced by the carrier on 24 April 2018.

After type certification, the first E190-E2 was delivered to launch operator Widerøe in April 2018, configured with 114-seat in single-class, followed by deliveries for Air Astana and Chinese GX Airlines. Before the aircraft were delivered, Embraer announced that some of the initial E-Jet E2s will need to be retrofitted due to the shorter life of the combustor in their Pratt & Whitney PW1900G engines. A business class is developed with a 2+2 staggered seat layout offering a seat pitch of up to 137 cm (54 in), available from mid-2019.

Embraer targets a 99% dispatch reliability after 12 months and 99.5% after four years while the E1 took 10 years to achieve its targeted reliability. On 4 April 2018, Widerøe took delivery of its first E190-E2 in Sao Jose dos Campos. It was introduced between Bergen and Tromsø, Norway on 24 April 2018. By June 2018, the first three E190-E2s delivered to Wideroe accumulated 413 flight hours and 332 cycles, an average of 6.57 cycles per day and an average stage length of 1.28 hours, with a 99.35% dispatch reliability and a 97.74% schedule reliability. Widerøe had a dispatch reliability of 98.5% after its first year of operation. The E2 series have received ETOPS 120 approval from Brazilian, American and European regulators as of March 2024.

=== Boeing–Embraer joint venture ===
In December 2017, Boeing and Embraer were discussing a potential combination. On 5 July 2018, Boeing and Embraer announced a Memorandum of Understanding to establish a joint venture, in which Boeing would hold an 80% stake, to produce and service Embraer's commercial airliners, including the E-Jet E2. Aviation industry analysts noted that the deal would be good for both companies, as Boeing needed smaller aircraft, like the E-Jet and E-Jet E2 families, and Embraer needed the marketing power of a larger company as the E-Jet E2 family was selling slowly.

On 26 February 2019, the partnership was approved by Embraer's shareholders, and the new joint venture was waiting for regulatory approval. On 24 April 2020, Boeing terminated the deal, stating that Embraer did not satisfy the conditions of the agreement. Embraer rejected Boeing's reasons, saying the company sought to avoid its commitments and said it would pursue "all remedies against Boeing for the damages incurred," which industry analysts believe may include damages for orders that were lost while customers were waiting for the deal to close.

== Design ==
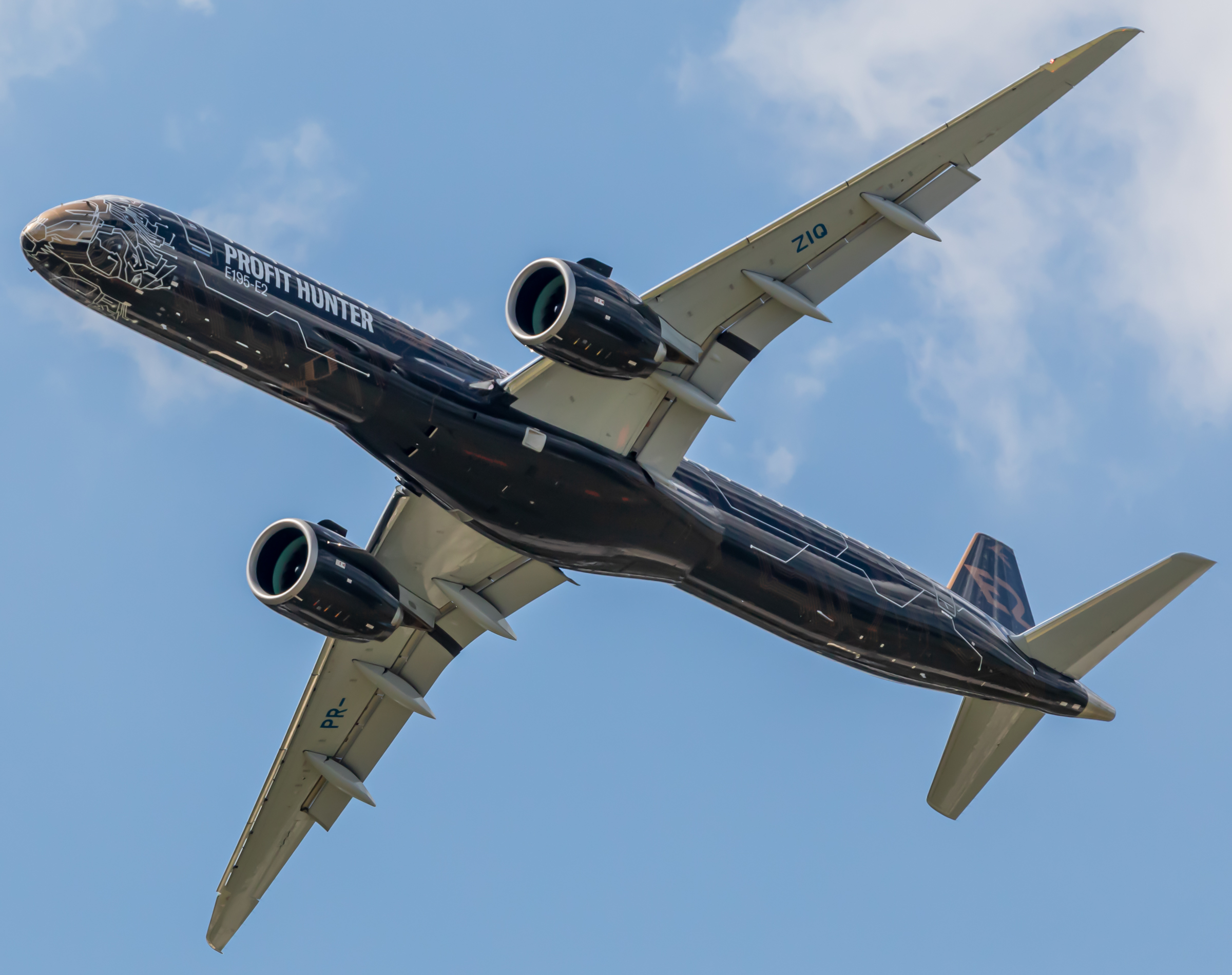
An E195-E2 from below: high wing aspect ratio and single slotted flaps

The E-Jet E2 family is based on the first generation E-Jet: its wing is redesigned, and it introduces new pylons, landing gear, horizontal stabilizers, cabin, cabin air system, air cycle machine, bleed air system, and a new fly-by-wire system. The E2 is exclusively powered by the Pratt & Whitney PW1000G Geared Turbofan engine; in comparison to traditional powerplants, the PW1000G offers improvements in fuel burn, pollutant and noise emissions, and operating costs via its lower fan pressure ratios and greater bypass ratios, achieved via the uncoupling of the fan from the low-pressure compressor and the low-pressure turbine. In addition to the main engines, the auxiliary power unit is also supplied by Pratt & Whitney.

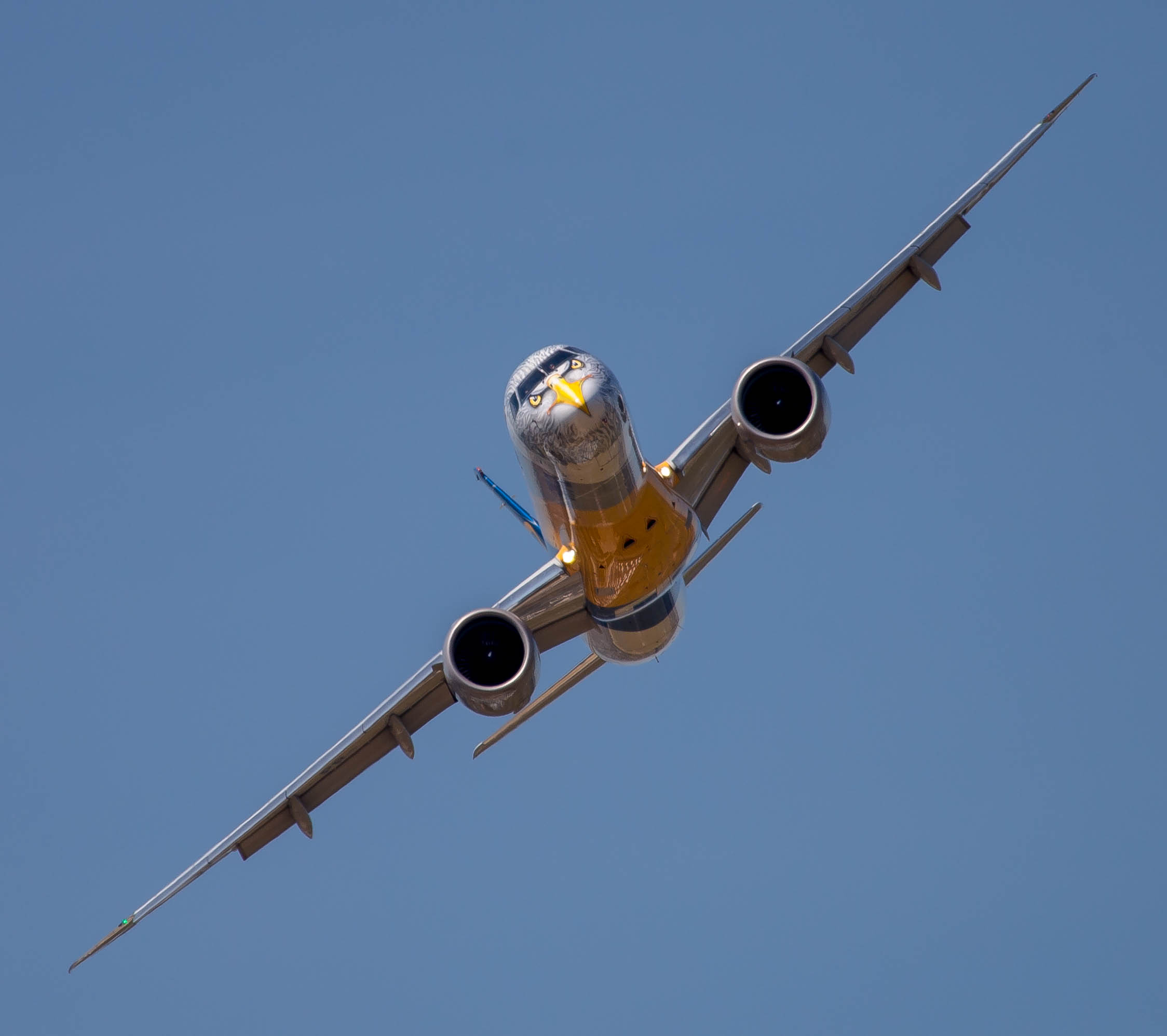
Embraer E195-E2 prototype, seen from front, showing its gull wing

The raised, 11:1 aspect ratio gull-wing partially accommodate the 2.01 m (79 in) diameter geared turbofan engine, larger than the CF34 engine by 66 cm (26 in) while the trailing arm landing gear is taller for 23–25 cm (9.1–9.8 in) higher door sills, giving a 5 cm (2.0 in) lower nacelles than the E1. The wing remains broadly similar to that of the E1, the main difference being the use of single-slotted flaps instead of the more complex and drag-generating double-slotted arrangement while the engine pylon is also shorter. The adoption of a composite wing was considered but found to be not yet economically justifiable. The wing structure was lightened by 200 kg (440 lb) due to the fly-by-wire ailerons, also used when braking, avoiding larger wheels and brakes. The horizontal stabilizer was reduced from 26 m^{2} (280 ft^{2}) on the E190 and E195 to 23 m^{2} (250 ft^{2}) on the E2 jets.

Embraer targeted 16 to 24% lower fuel burn and 15–25% lower maintenance cost per seat. In the E190-E2, of the 17.3% better fuel burn, 11% comes from the geared turbofan, 4.8% from the improved aerodynamics of the new high aspect ratio wing and 1.5% from the fly-by-wire's 15% smaller tail surfaces.

Over a 600 nmi (1,100 km; 690 mi) trip and with fuel costing US$72 a barrel, Embraer claims a 97-seat E190-E2 trip cost is 7% lower for a 1% higher seat cost than a 106-seat A220-100, and a 120-seat E195-E2 has a 2% higher trip cost but a 10% lower seat cost than a A220-100. The E195-E2 has a claimed 10% lower trip cost and 3% lower seat cost than a 129-seat A220-300. Embraer claims an E190-E2 has a 30% lower trip cost for an 8% higher seat cost than a 150-seat A320neo, and an E195-E2 has the same seat cost but 20% lower trip cost. In October 2018, Embraer raised its E190/E195-E2 seat or trip costs claim to roughly 10% better than the A220.

The cabin of the E2 was designed around customer requirements that called for greater robustness, flexible reconfiguration, and improved maintainability. The lighting is entirely by LEDs; they can be controlled via the integrated cabin management system along with other functions such as cabin temperature control, water and waste system monitoring, moving map, flight attendant calls, cabin systems power, and audio digital playback amongst others. The interior features modular provisions that enable the future installation of new equipment and whole systems relatively easily and quickly either while in the original production process or mid-life retrofitting. Many interior elements of the cabin, such as panels, bins, galley elements, and lavatories, are provided by EZ Air, a joint venture between Zodiac Aerospace and Embraer. In comparison with the E1 family, the cabin side walls were replaced with slimmer counterparts to gain 2.5 cm (1 in) on each side while new overhead bins are 7.6 cm (3 in) deeper. Baggage bins have been enlarged by 40%.

The E2 features a closed loop fly-by-wire flight control system which reduces weight, increases fuel efficiency, enhances control and increases safety by full envelope protection in all flight phases compared to the first E-Jet. The fuel savings of the now closed loop fly-by-wire control come from the enhanced flight stability and the resulting increased lift (lower tail downward force) and weight savings and drag reductions related to the 26% reduction in the horizontal tail (tailplane) size. The Primary Flight Control System is supplied by Moog Inc. The Honeywell Primus Epic 2 avionics suite is used across the family, which aids in maintaining commonality with the E1. The cockpit is equipped with landscape displays and advanced graphics capabilities via this suite.

Basic maintenance inspections occur every 1,000 flight hours, up from 850 on the E1, while the intermediate check interval grew to 10,000 flight hours from 8,500. The heavy-check downtime was reduced by 15% from the E1, no out-of-phase tasks are required, and control and corrosion prevention is required every eight years with 82 tasks down from 240.

== Operational history ==
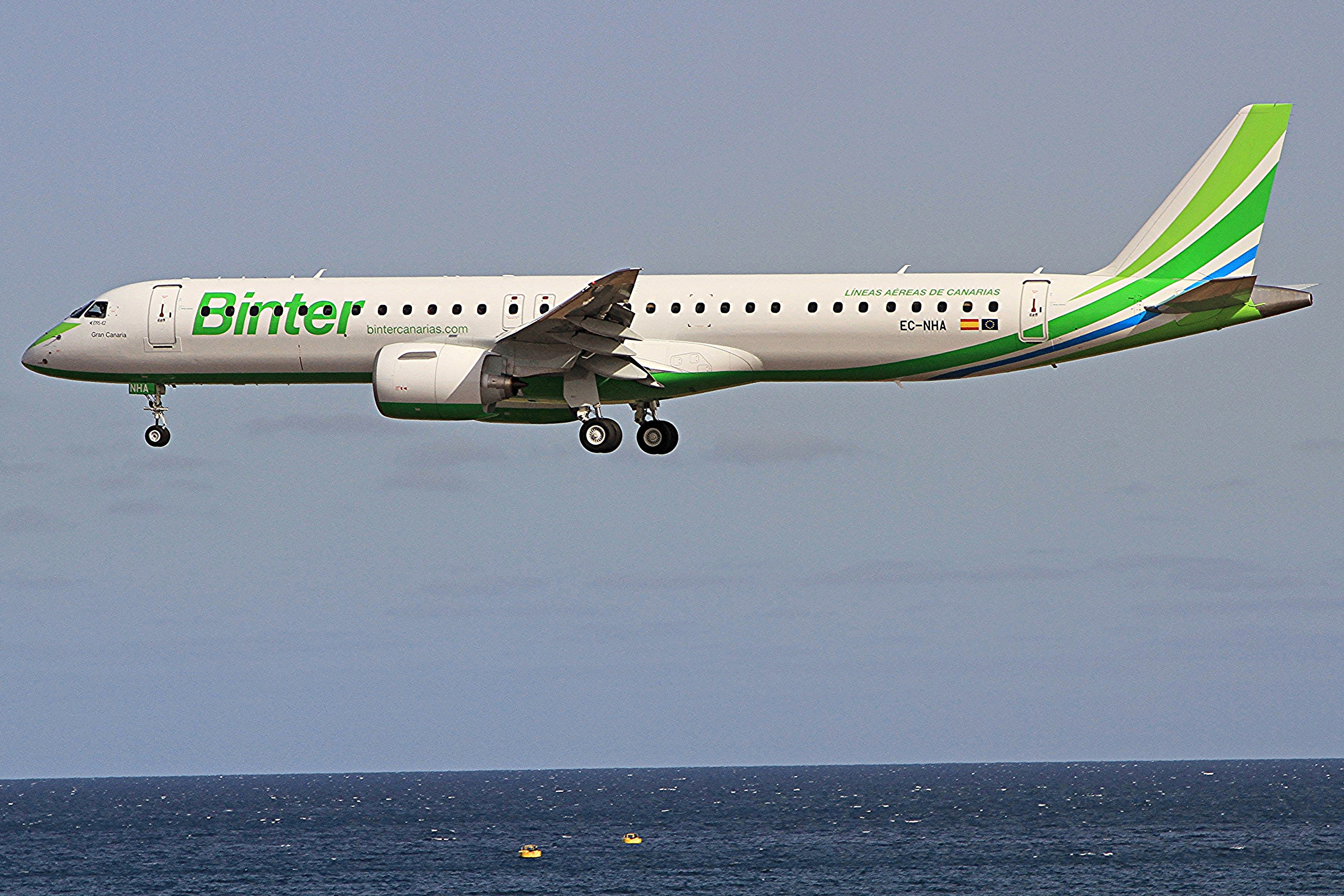
Binter Canarias E195-E2

On 3 December 2018, Air Astana received its first E190-E2 of an order of five, to replace nine E190LR used on domestic and regional routes since 2011.

On 31 October 2019, Helvetic Airways became the fourth airline to take delivery of an E2 aircraft and the third (after Widerøe and Air Astana) to receive an E190-E2 aircraft, configured in a single-class layout with 110 seats. On 1 November 2019, Helvetic Airways made their first revenue flight with the E190-E2. The inaugural flight, LX850, was a 336 nmi (623 km), 95-minute leg from Zürich to Bremen.

On 21 November 2019, Binter Canarias became the fifth airline to take delivery of an E2 aircraft and the second (after Azul Brazilian Airlines) to receive an E195-E2 aircraft, configured in a single-class layout with 132 seats. On 13 December 2019, Binter Canarias made their first revenue flight with the E195-E2, which was to depart from Gran Canaria at 11:35 and to arrive at Sal at 14:00.

On 30 December 2019, Air Kiribati received its first E190-E2 of an order of two, becoming the fourth airline to take delivery of an E190-E2 aircraft. The airliner, configured in a two-class layout with 92 seats (12 business and 80 economy class), is to serve destinations throughout the vast expanse of Kiribati, including nonstop from Tarawa to Kiritimati (Christmas) Island (the current domestic flight from Tarawa to Kiritimati requires an international stopover in Fiji).

== Variants ==
=== E175-E2 ===
The E175-E2 (ERJ 190–500) model is the smallest in the E-Jet Second Generation family. The E175-E2 will be extended by 60 cm (24 in) from the E175, allowing for the addition of one seat row and a capacity up to 90 passengers. In 2013, the aircraft was expected to cost US$46.8 million.

While the first-generation E175 proved popular with regional airlines in the United States, the weight of the E175-E2 has prevented sales to these customers. Scope clause agreements between mainline carriers and their pilots unions prevent these airlines from contracting with regional airlines to operate aircraft with maximum takeoff weight exceeding 39,000 kg (86,000 lb). The E175-E2 exceeds this limit by 5,400 kg (12,000 lb), due to its heavier geared turbofan engines.

The E175-E2 prototype first flew on 12 December 2019 from São José dos Campos, for 2 hours and 18 minutes, starting a test and certification campaign that was expected to take 24 months and involve two additional aircraft. At that time, Embraer said it believed there would be strong demand for the jet from outside North America, but as of 2023 the company had received no orders for the variant.

First delivery was initially scheduled for 2021. It has been repeatedly delayed and in February 2022, Embraer announced that it would halt development of the E175-E2 for three years, with deliveries expected to begin between 2027 and 2028.

=== E190-E2 ===
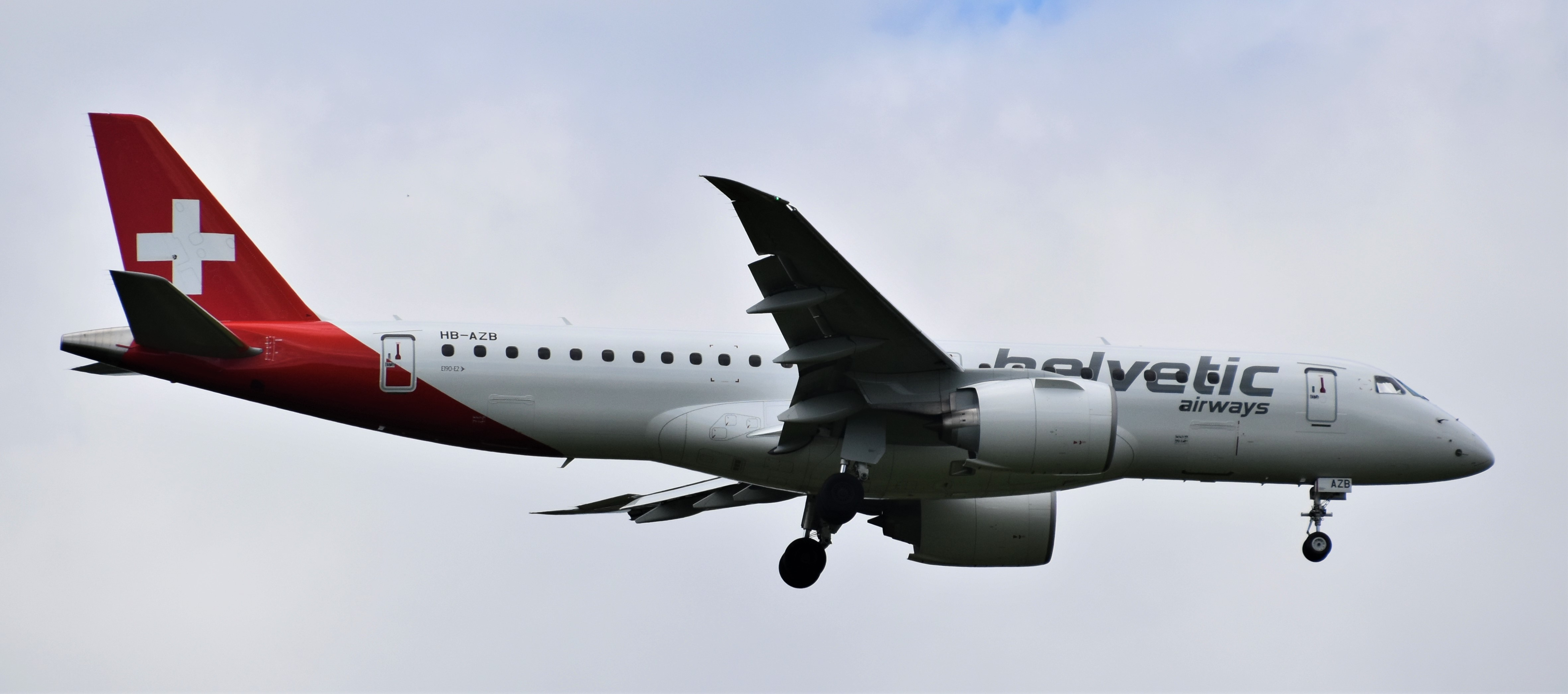
E190-E2 of Helvetic Airways

==== Design ====
The E190-E2 (ERJ 190-300 STD) keeps the original E190 36.24 m (119 ft) length and has a single overwing exit per side. Powered by the 98 kN (22,000 lbf) PW1900G which has a 190 cm (73 in) fan for a 12:1 bypass ratio. The aluminum wing span increased to 33.7 m (111 ft) for the highest wing aspect ratio of any airliner, just over 11, while the larger E195-E2 has a longer wingtip and the smaller E175-E2 has a downsized wing. It was moved forward to shift the center of gravity envelope aft to reduce the horizontal stabilizer downforce, lowering fuel burn by 1.5%. The trailing link main landing gear has wheel doors to reduce fuel consumption by 1% and is 51 cm (20 in) taller to provide enough engine ground clearance. The E2 have 75% new parts, closed-loop controls fly-by-wire instead of the open-loop type in the E1 gaining improved maintenance intervals. For E1-rated pilots, the transition to the new type need 2.5 days with no full flight simulator, having similar Honeywell Primus Epic 2 avionics. The E190-E2 (ERJ 190–300) has a 5 m (16 ft) wider wingspan but otherwise is close in size to the E190, with up to 114 seats in a single class configuration. (Note: Embraer ERJ 190-300 is commercially named as "Embraer 190-E2" or “E190-E2”)

==== Development ====
The E190-E2 unit cost was US$53.6 million in 2013. Embraer had it certified on 28 February 2018. Certification needed 46,000 test hours on ground and 2,200 in flight. Due to better than expected fuel burn during tests, in January 2018 Embraer increased the range to 2,880 nmi (3,310 mi; 5,330 km), and Bombardier tried to implicate it in the CSeries dumping petition by Boeing as it could attain a 2,900 nmi (3,300 mi; 5,400 km) range. It entered service with Widerøe on 24 April 2018. In 2018, a newly delivered E190-E2 was worth $34 million, $3 million more than the E190, falling to $20 million in seven years, a 40% decline to be compared with 30% projected for an A320neo over the same timeframe.

=== E195-E2 ===
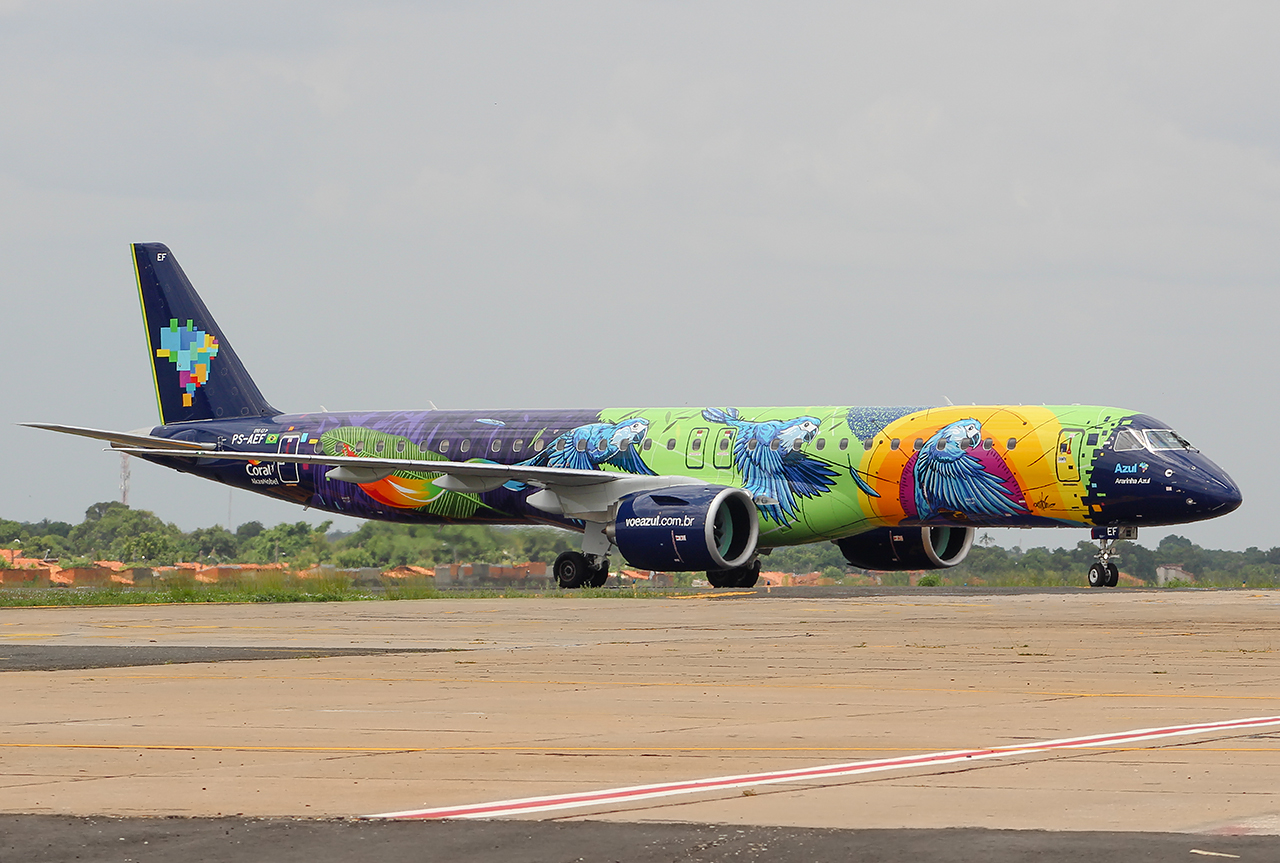
E195-E2 of Azul, this type's launch operator.

The E195-E2 (ERJ 190-400 STD) is extended by three seat rows from the E195 by 2.85 m (9.4 ft) in length, accommodates up to 150 seats. The E195-E2 is 5.26 m (17.3 ft) longer than the E190-E2 and has dual overwing exits per side. The variant has a unit cost of US$60.4 million in 2013.

In February 2016, Embraer announced that it had decided to increase the E195-E2's wingspan by 1.4 m (4.6 ft) for greater lift, along with a MTOW increase of 2 t (4,400 lb) to extend its range by 450 nmi (520 mi; 830 km) at sea-level starts, and 250 nmi (290 mi; 460 km) in hot and high conditions. It competes with the Airbus A220-300, at a lower unit cost. As well, Embraer claims E195 trip costs are 22% lower than a 154-seat A320neo and 24% below a 160-seat 737-8 - but airlines install more seats, widening seat costs further apart than the 6% and 8% quoted by Embraer.

The variant rolled out on 7 March 2017 and Azul was confirmed as its launch operator. It first flew on 29 March 2017, ahead of the previously scheduled second half of the year. Embraer showcased the prototype at the Paris Air Show in June 2017 and planned for it to enter service in the first half of 2019. By January 2019, the flight-test program preliminary results showed the E195-E2 could end up being a little above specifications at introduction. It was certified on 15 April 2019, with a fuel burn 1.4% less than originally specified for 25.4% less per seat than the E195. Binter Canarias was its European launch customer, taking delivery in late 2019.

On 12 September 2019, Embraer delivered its first E195-E2 to Azul through lessor AerCap, configured with 136 seats in a single class. On 22 July 2022, an E195-E2 landed at London City Airport (LCY) for the first time. The variant received EASA certification in November 2023 making it the largest aircraft cleared to operate from the small airport.

On 23 July 2024, during the Farnborough International Airshow, Embraer announced performance upgrades on the E195-E2. Fuel burn was improved by 2.5%, and the MTOW increased to 62,500 kg. Both of these changes enabled a range increase from 2,600 nmi (3,000 mi) to 3,000 nmi (3,500 mi).

The E195-E2 can produce a "whale sound" during takeoff and landing. This occurs when the engine causes the combustion chamber to resonate at a certain frequency. It is a normal behavior, but Embraer has announced that they would redesign the combustion chamber to reduce this effect.

== Operators ==
As of July 21, 2026, there were 195 E2-Jet aircraft in commercial service with 17 known operators; the three largest operators are Porter Airlines (52), Azul Brazilian Airlines (43), and KLM Cityhopper (25). Embraer is also in negotiations with Turkish Aerospace Industries which includes an option to locally produce the aircraft by manufacturing and assembling metallic and composite structures, final assembly of fuselages, components, test and production flights, and painting and involving R&D.

=== List of operators ===
Airlines	E175-Е2	E190-Е2	E195-Е2	E2-Jet family	Refs
Air Kiribati	—	2	—	2	
Airlink	—	—	7	7	
Air Peace	—	—	5	5	
Azul Brazilian Airlines	—	—	44	44	
Binter Canarias	—	—	16	16	
Helvetic Airways	—	8	4	12	
Hunnu Air	—	---	2	2	
KLM Cityhopper	—	—	25	25	
LATAM Airlines Brasil	—	—	2	2	
LOT Polish Airlines	—	—	3	3	
Luxair	—	—	4	4	
Mexicana de Aviación	—	3	5	8	
Placar Linhas Aéreas	—	2	—	2	
Porter Airlines	—	—	56	56	
Royal Jordanian Airlines	—	4	5	9	
Scoot	—	9	—	9	
TUI fly Belgium	—	—	3	3	
Widerøe	—	3	—	3	
Virgin Australia Regional Airlines	—	5	—	5	
Total	—	36	181	217	

Source: PlaneBase NG (16–09–2026)

=== Model summary ===
E2-Jet model summary
Model variant	Orders	Deliveries	Backlog
E175-E2	—	—	—
E190-E2 (Note: Includes 16 E190-E2 ordered by JAL Group on 14 October 2026)	92	42	50
E195-E2	464	182	282
E2-Jet family	556	224	332

Source: Embraer's order book as of 23 October 2026

=== Orders and deliveries ===
The Embraer E-Jet E2 program was officially launched during the 50th International Paris Air Show held in June 2013, with SkyWest Airlines, a North American regional airline, and International Lease Finance Corporation (ILFC), a leasing company placing the first firm orders for the aircraft.

SkyWest was intended as the launch customer of the Embraer E175-E2, with the airline placing a firm order for 100 aircraft, with purchase rights for another 100, an order valued at US$9.36 billion at list price, although airlines routinely receive deep discounts from the list price of planes. The order was canceled in Q3 of 2018 due to the airplane being too heavy to operate under scope clauses.

ILFC is the launch customer for the Embraer E190-E2 and E195-E2, with the leasing company placing a firm order for 25 E190-E2 aircraft and 25 E195-E2 aircraft, with purchase rights for another 25 of each type in 2013. ILFC was purchased by AerCap in May 2014.

Overall, sales for the E-Jet E2 program had a slow start. Analysts attribute sluggish orders to the weight of the E175-E2 and the positioning of the E190-E2 “in-between” other models, and Pratt & Whitney's issues with the engine. Embraer has said that it needs to sell 700 aircraft to meet its goals for the program.

Sales gained momentum later on, with 2025 being the best sales year of the E2 program, totaling 154 firm orders.

In September 2026, Embraer delivered the 2,000th E-Jet, an E195-E2, to Azul Linhas Aéreas. Embraer claims that The E-Jets have become one of the three most successful commercial aircraft programs ever, behind only Airbus A320 and Boeing 737 families.

E2 family orders by year (distributive)
Model Variant	2013	2014	2015	2016	2017	2018	2019	2020	2021	2022	2023	2024	2025	2026	Total
E175-E2	100	—	—	—	—	-100	—	—	—	—	—	—	—	—	0
E190-E2	25	35	17	8	-11	-27	-20	-5	—	3	10	17	15	25	92
E195-E2	25	25	40	—	16	5	33	9	50	42	26	11	119	63	464
Orders	150	60	57	8	5	-122	13	4	50	45	36	28	134	88	556

E2 family deliveries by year (distributive)
Model Variant	2018	2019	2020	2021	2022	2023	2024	2025	2026	Total
E175-E2	—	—	—	—	—	—	—	—	—	—
E190-E2	—	7	4	2	1	1	8	6	9	42
E195-E2	4	7	7	19	18	38	39	38	16	182
Deliveries	4	14	11	21	19	39	47	44	25	224

Embraer E-Jets E2 firm orders
Initial order	Country	Customer	E190-E2	E195-E2	E2-Jet family	Refs
17 July 2013	Ireland	AerCap	5	43	48	
17 July 2014	China	ICBC	—	10	10	
21 May 2015	Brazil	Azul (Note: E195-E2 launch customer)	—	25	25	
15 June 2015	United States	Aircastle	—	25	25	
16 January 2017	Norway	Widerøe (Note: E190-E2 launch operator)	3	—	3	
26 September 2018	Switzerland	Helvetic Airways	8	7	15	
13 November 2018	Spain	Binter Canarias	—	21	21	
18 December 2018	Kiribati	Air Kiribati	2	—	2	
3 April 2019	Nigeria	Air Peace	—	16	16	
23 April 2021	Canada	Porter Airlines	—	75	75	
24 January 2022	United States	Azorra	16	38	54	
6 October 2022	Oman	SalamAir	—	6	6	
18 May 2023	Jordan	Royal Jordanian	—	2	2	
30 June 2023	Brazil	Placar Linhas Aéreas	1	—	1	
11 October 2023	Luxembourg	Luxair	3	6	9	
3 June 2024	Mexico	Mexicana de Aviación	10	10	20	
12 August 2024	Australia	Virgin Australia Regional Airlines	4	—	4	
25 February 2025	Japan	ANA Holdings	23	—	23	
1 July 2025	Denmark	SAS Link	—	45	45	
10 September 2025	United States	Avelo Airlines	—	50	50	
22 September 2025	Brazil	LATAM Airlines Brasil	—	24	24	
14 October 2025	Netherlands	TrueNoord	—	20	20	
23 March 2026	Finland	Finnair Group (Note: To be operated by Nordic Regional Airlines)	—	18	18	
21 July 2026	Colombia	Abra Group	—	20	20	
15 October 2026	Japan	Japan Airlines Group (Note: To be operated by J-AIR)	16	—	16	
		Undisclosed	1	3	4	
Totals			92	464	556	

Embraer E-Jets E2 firm order backlog
Customer	E190-E2	E195-E2	E2-Jet Family
Abra Group	—	20	20
AerCap	—	1	1
Aircastle	—	7	7
Air Peace	—	11	11
ANA Holdings	23	—	23
Avelo Airlines	—	50	50
Azorra	—	18	18
Azul (Note: E195-E2 launch customer)	—	25	25
Binter Canarias	—	5	5
Finnair Group	—	18	18
Helvetic Airways	—	3	3
Japan Airlines Group	16	—	16
LATAM	—	24	24
Luxair	3	2	5
Mexicana de Aviación	5	5	10
Porter Airlines	—	19	19
SalamAir	—	6	6
SAS Link	—	45	45
TrueNoord	—	20	20
Virgin Australia Regional Airlines	3	—	3
Undisclosed	—	3	3
Totals	50	282	332

== Specifications ==
E-Jet E2 brochure
Variant	E175-E2	E190-E2	E195-E2
Cockpit crew	Two		
3-class seats	80 (12J + 12W + 56Y)	97 (9J + 20W) + 68Y)	120 (12J + 24W) + 84Y)
Maximum seats	90	114	146
Seat width	46 cm (18.3 in)		
Length	32.40 m (106 ft 4 in)	36.25 m (118 ft 11 in)	41.51 m (136 ft 2 in)
Height	9.98 m (32 ft 9 in)	10.96 m (35 ft 11 in)	10.91 m (35 ft 10 in)
Wingspan	31.39 m (103 ft 0 in)	33.72 m (110 ft 8 in)	35.12 m (115 ft 3 in)
Wing area	82 m^{2} (880 ft^{2})	103 m^{2} (1,110 ft^{2})	
Aspect ratio	12.02	11.04	11.97
Maximum takeoff weight	44,600 kg (98,300 lb)	56,400 kg (124,300 lb)	62,500 kg (137,800 lb)
Operating empty weight		33,000 kg (73,000 lb)	35,700 kg (78,705 lb)
Max payload	10,600 kg (23,400 lb)	13,500 kg (29,800 lb)	16,150 kg (35,600 lb)
Max fuel	8,522 kg (18,788 lb)	13,690 kg (30,180 lb)	
Takeoff (MTOW, ISA, SL)	1,730 m (5,680 ft)	1,615 m (5,299 ft)	1,840 m (6,040 ft)
Landing (MLW, ISA, SL)	1,300 m (4,300 ft)	1,215 m (3,986 ft)	1,290 m (4,230 ft)
Maximum speed	Mach 0.82 (473 kn; 876 km/h; 544 mph) @ 35,000 ft (11,000 m)		
Cruise	Mach 0.78 (450 kn; 833 km/h; 518 mph) @ 35,000 ft (11,000 m)		
Range (full pax)	2,000 nmi (3,700 km; 2,300 mi)	2,950 nmi (5,460 km; 3,390 mi)	3,000 nmi (5,600 km; 3,500 mi)
Service ceiling	12,500 m (41,000 ft)		
Engines (2×)	Pratt & Whitney PW1700G	Pratt & Whitney PW1900G	
Fan diameter	140 cm (56 in)	190 cm (73 in)	
Thrust (2×)	67 kN (15,000 lbf)	85–102 kN (19,000–23,000 lbf)	

== See also ==
Related development

- Embraer E-Jet family

Aircraft of comparable role, configuration, and era

- Airbus A220
- Mitsubishi SpaceJet
- Sukhoi Superjet 100/130
