= 1981 Campeonato Paulista =

Campeonato Paulista – Série A1
- Season: 1981
- Champions: São Paulo
- Relegated: Noroeste
- Taça de Ouro: São Paulo; Ponte Preta; Inter de Limeira; Santos; XV de Jaú; São José
- Taça de Prata: Corinthians; Portuguesa; Palmeiras; Botafogo; Juventus
- Matches played: 537
- Goals scored: 1,190 (2.22 per match)
- Top goalscorer: Jorge Mendonça (Guarani) – 38 goals
- Biggest home win: Guarani 5-0 América (June 17, 1981); Ponte Preta 5-0 Santos (July 11, 1981); Ponte Preta 6-1 Taubaté (August 9, 1981)
- Biggest away win: Comercial 0-5 Guarani (June 21, 1981); Ferroviária 0-5 Taubaté (September 6, 1981)
- Highest scoring: Taubaté 3-4 Marília (March 5, 1981); Taubaté 5-2 Juventus (March 8, 1981); Guarani 2-5 XV de Jaú (May 31, 1981); São José 3-4 Taubaté (July 5, 1981); Ponte Preta 6-1 Taubaté (August 9, 1981); Taubaté 5-2 Comercial (August 12, 1981); Juventus 5-2 Comercial (September 20, 1981)

The 1981 Campeonato Paulista da Primeira Divisão de Futebol Profissional was the 80th season of São Paulo's top professional football league. São Paulo won the championship for their 13th title. Noroeste was relegated.

== Championship ==
The championship would be divided into two rounds, and each round was divided into three phases - Qualifying, in which two teams qualified into the Final phase, Regular, in which six teams qualified into the Final phase, and Final, divided into two groups of four, with the winners of each group qualifying to the Finals. The winners of each round qualified to the Championship Finals.

=== First round ===
==== Qualifying phase ====
This stage involved twelve teams: all of the first level teams except for the eight teams that were still participating either in that year's Taça de Ouro or the Taça de Ouro. The twelve teams were divided into two groups of six, in which each team played twice against the teams of its own group. the top two teams of each group qualified to a playoff to determine the two teams that would qualify into that round's final phase.

===== Group Gold =====
| Pos | Team | Pld | W | D | L | GF | GA | GD | Pts | Qualification or relegation |
|---|---|---|---|---|---|---|---|---|---|---|
| 1 | São Bento | 10 | 7 | 1 | 2 | 19 | 15 | +4 | 15 | Qualified |
| 2 | Marília | 10 | 5 | 3 | 2 | 19 | 16 | +3 | 13 | Qualified |
| 3 | São José | 10 | 3 | 3 | 4 | 15 | 12 | +3 | 9 | |
| 4 | XV de Jaú | 10 | 3 | 3 | 4 | 15 | 17 | −2 | 9 | |
| 5 | Juventus | 10 | 3 | 3 | 4 | 16 | 19 | −3 | 9 | |
| 6 | Taubaté | 10 | 1 | 3 | 6 | 14 | 19 | −5 | 5 | |

Updated to match(es) played on March 28, 1981. Source: RSSSF.com
Rules for classification: 1) points; 2) wins; 3) goal difference; 4) number of goals scored.

===== Group Red =====
| Pos | Team | Pld | W | D | L | GF | GA | GD | Pts | Qualification or relegation |
|---|---|---|---|---|---|---|---|---|---|---|
| 1 | Comercial | 10 | 5 | 3 | 2 | 16 | 8 | +8 | 13 | Qualified |
| 2 | América | 10 | 4 | 4 | 2 | 10 | 9 | +1 | 12 | Qualified |
| 3 | Ferroviária | 10 | 5 | 1 | 4 | 15 | 12 | +3 | 11 | |
| 4 | Botafogo | 10 | 3 | 4 | 3 | 11 | 11 | 0 | 10 | |
| 5 | Francana | 10 | 2 | 5 | 3 | 10 | 10 | 0 | 9 | |
| 6 | Noroeste | 10 | 2 | 1 | 7 | 9 | 21 | −12 | 5 | |

Updated to match(es) played on March 28, 1981. Source: RSSSF.com
Rules for classification: 1) points; 2) wins; 3) goal difference; 4) number of goals scored.

===== Qualifying phase Finals =====
| Team 1 | Agg. | Team 2 | 1st leg | 2nd leg |
|---|---|---|---|---|
| Marília | 1–2 | Comercial | 1–0 | 0–2 |
| América | 2–1 | São Bento | 1–0 | 1–1 |

==== Regular phase ====
| Pos | Team | Pld | W | D | L | GF | GA | GD | Pts | Qualification or relegation |
|---|---|---|---|---|---|---|---|---|---|---|
| 1 | Ponte Preta | 19 | 11 | 7 | 1 | 29 | 13 | +16 | 29 | Qualified |
| 2 | Guarani | 19 | 9 | 7 | 3 | 36 | 23 | +13 | 25 | Qualified |
| 3 | Inter de Limeira | 19 | 10 | 4 | 5 | 31 | 21 | +10 | 24 | Qualified |
| 4 | Botafogo | 19 | 9 | 4 | 6 | 16 | 15 | +1 | 22 | Qualified |
| 5 | Portuguesa | 19 | 8 | 6 | 5 | 19 | 16 | +3 | 22 | Qualified |
| 6 | Santos | 19 | 9 | 3 | 7 | 26 | 20 | +6 | 21 | Qualified |
| 7 | Corinthians | 19 | 7 | 7 | 5 | 28 | 20 | +8 | 21 | Second round qualifying phase |
| 8 | XV de Jaú | 19 | 7 | 7 | 5 | 20 | 16 | +4 | 21 | Second round qualifying phase |
| 9 | Juventus | 19 | 7 | 6 | 6 | 17 | 11 | +6 | 20 | Second round qualifying phase |
| 10 | São José | 19 | 6 | 8 | 5 | 21 | 22 | −1 | 20 | Second round qualifying phase |
| 11 | São Paulo | 19 | 7 | 5 | 7 | 22 | 14 | +8 | 19 | Second round qualifying phase |
| 12 | América | 19 | 5 | 9 | 5 | 11 | 14 | −3 | 19 | Qualified through the Qualifying phase |
| 13 | Palmeiras | 19 | 4 | 11 | 4 | 22 | 20 | +2 | 19 | Second round qualifying phase |
| 14 | Taubaté | 19 | 6 | 6 | 7 | 26 | 26 | 0 | 18 | Second round qualifying phase |
| 15 | Comercial | 19 | 5 | 7 | 7 | 15 | 26 | −11 | 17 | Qualified through the Qualifying phase |
| 16 | Francana | 19 | 4 | 6 | 9 | 20 | 31 | −11 | 14 | Second round qualifying phase |
| 17 | Ferroviária | 19 | 3 | 7 | 9 | 15 | 25 | −10 | 13 | Second round qualifying phase |
| 18 | Marília | 19 | 4 | 4 | 11 | 16 | 28 | −12 | 12 | Second round qualifying phase |
| 19 | Noroeste | 19 | 4 | 4 | 11 | 10 | 22 | −12 | 12 | Second round qualifying phase |
| 20 | São Bento | 19 | 2 | 8 | 9 | 12 | 27 | −15 | 12 | Second round qualifying phase |

Updated to match(es) played on July 7, 1981. Source: RSSSF.com
Rules for classification: 1) points; 2) wins; 3) goal difference; 4) number of goals scored.

==== Final phase ====
===== Group Red =====
| Pos | Team | Pld | W | D | L | GF | GA | GD | Pts | Qualification or relegation |
|---|---|---|---|---|---|---|---|---|---|---|
| 1 | Ponte Preta | 6 | 3 | 3 | 0 | 9 | 2 | +7 | 9 | Qualified |
| 2 | América | 6 | 2 | 3 | 1 | 4 | 3 | +1 | 7 | |
| 3 | Botafogo | 6 | 1 | 3 | 2 | 2 | 4 | −2 | 5 | |
| 4 | Santos | 6 | 1 | 1 | 4 | 4 | 10 | −6 | 3 | |

Updated to match(es) played on July 29, 1981. Source: RSSSF.com
Rules for classification: 1) points; 2) wins; 3) goal difference; 4) number of goals scored.

===== Group Black =====
| Pos | Team | Pld | W | D | L | GF | GA | GD | Pts | Qualification or relegation |
|---|---|---|---|---|---|---|---|---|---|---|
| 1 | Guarani | 6 | 4 | 2 | 0 | 10 | 2 | +8 | 10 | Qualified |
| 2 | Comercial | 6 | 2 | 2 | 2 | 6 | 7 | −1 | 6 | |
| 3 | Portuguesa | 6 | 2 | 1 | 3 | 6 | 8 | −2 | 5 | |
| 4 | Inter de Limeira | 6 | 0 | 3 | 3 | 4 | 9 | −5 | 3 | |

Updated to match(es) played on July 29, 1981. Source: RSSSF.com
Rules for classification: 1) points; 2) wins; 3) goal difference; 4) number of goals scored.

==== First round Finals ====
| Team 1 | Agg. | Team 2 | 1st leg | 2nd leg |
|---|---|---|---|---|
| Guarani | 3–4 | Ponte Preta | 1–1 | 2–3 |

=== Second round ===
==== Qualifying phase ====
This stage, that happened simultaneously with the First round's Final stage, was composed of the twelve teams that had been eliminated in the First round, divided into three groups of four, in which each team played twice against the teams of its own group, with the best team in each group qualifying to the Finals, where the three teams played once against each other, the best two qualifying to the Second round's Final phase.

===== Group Green =====
| Pos | Team | Pld | W | D | L | GF | GA | GD | Pts | Qualification or relegation |
|---|---|---|---|---|---|---|---|---|---|---|
| 1 | Palmeiras | 6 | 2 | 4 | 0 | 6 | 2 | +4 | 8 | Qualified |
| 2 | São Bento | 6 | 3 | 1 | 2 | 5 | 4 | +1 | 7 | |
| 3 | Ferroviária | 6 | 0 | 5 | 1 | 5 | 7 | −2 | 5 | |
| 4 | XV de Jaú | 6 | 0 | 4 | 2 | 3 | 6 | −3 | 4 | |

Updated to match(es) played on July 29, 1981. Source: RSSSF.com
Rules for classification: 1) points; 2) wins; 3) goal difference; 4) number of goals scored.

===== Group Gold =====
| Pos | Team | Pld | W | D | L | GF | GA | GD | Pts | Qualification or relegation |
|---|---|---|---|---|---|---|---|---|---|---|
| 1 | São Paulo | 6 | 4 | 0 | 2 | 12 | 5 | +7 | 8 | Qualified |
| 2 | Noroeste | 6 | 2 | 2 | 2 | 6 | 8 | −2 | 6 | |
| 3 | Taubaté | 6 | 2 | 1 | 3 | 4 | 5 | −1 | 5 | |
| 4 | Francana | 6 | 2 | 1 | 3 | 5 | 9 | −4 | 5 | |

Updated to match(es) played on July 29, 1981. Source: RSSSF.com
Rules for classification: 1) points; 2) wins; 3) goal difference; 4) number of goals scored.

===== Group Red =====
| Pos | Team | Pld | W | D | L | GF | GA | GD | Pts | Qualification or relegation |
|---|---|---|---|---|---|---|---|---|---|---|
| 1 | Corinthians | 6 | 3 | 3 | 0 | 10 | 6 | +4 | 9 | Qualified |
| 2 | Juventus | 6 | 2 | 3 | 1 | 8 | 5 | +3 | 7 | |
| 3 | São José | 6 | 0 | 4 | 2 | 3 | 6 | −3 | 4 | |
| 4 | Marília | 6 | 0 | 4 | 2 | 5 | 9 | −4 | 4 | |

Updated to match(es) played on July 29, 1981. Source: RSSSF.com
Rules for classification: 1) points; 2) wins; 3) goal difference; 4) number of goals scored.

===== Qualifying phase Finals =====
| Pos | Team | Pld | W | D | L | GF | GA | GD | Pts | Qualification or relegation |
|---|---|---|---|---|---|---|---|---|---|---|
| 1 | São Paulo | 2 | 1 | 1 | 0 | 2 | 1 | +1 | 3 | Qualified |
| 2 | Palmeiras | 2 | 1 | 0 | 1 | 1 | 1 | 0 | 2 | Qualified |
| 3 | Corinthians | 2 | 0 | 1 | 1 | 1 | 2 | −1 | 1 | |

Updated to match(es) played on August 6, 1981. Source: RSSSF.com
Rules for classification: 1) points; 2) wins; 3) goal difference; 4) number of goals scored.

==== Regular phase ====
| Pos | Team | Pld | W | D | L | GF | GA | GD | Pts | Qualification or relegation |
|---|---|---|---|---|---|---|---|---|---|---|
| 1 | São Paulo | 19 | 11 | 3 | 5 | 36 | 18 | +18 | 25 | Qualified through the Qualifying phase |
| 2 | Guarani | 19 | 9 | 6 | 4 | 34 | 23 | +11 | 24 | Qualified |
| 3 | São José | 19 | 8 | 6 | 5 | 19 | 18 | +1 | 22 | Qualified |
| 4 | Ponte Preta | 19 | 7 | 8 | 4 | 31 | 20 | +11 | 22 | Qualified |
| 5 | XV de Jaú | 19 | 7 | 8 | 4 | 24 | 17 | +7 | 22 | Qualified |
| 6 | Santos | 19 | 7 | 8 | 4 | 21 | 15 | +6 | 22 | Qualified |
| 7 | Palmeiras | 19 | 6 | 8 | 5 | 20 | 24 | −4 | 20 | Qualified through the Qualifying phase |
| 8 | Corinthians | 19 | 6 | 7 | 6 | 23 | 23 | 0 | 19 | Qualified |
| 9 | Ferroviária | 19 | 6 | 7 | 6 | 22 | 26 | −4 | 19 | |
| 10 | Marília | 19 | 5 | 9 | 5 | 24 | 26 | −2 | 19 | |
| 11 | Comercial | 19 | 7 | 4 | 8 | 20 | 31 | −11 | 18 | |
| 12 | Portuguesa | 19 | 5 | 8 | 6 | 16 | 17 | −1 | 18 | |
| 13 | Juventus | 19 | 4 | 10 | 5 | 26 | 21 | +5 | 18 | |
| 14 | Inter de Limeira | 19 | 4 | 10 | 5 | 12 | 15 | −3 | 18 | |
| 15 | São Bento | 19 | 4 | 10 | 5 | 14 | 19 | −5 | 18 | |
| 16 | Francana | 19 | 4 | 9 | 6 | 18 | 22 | −4 | 17 | |
| 17 | Botafogo | 19 | 5 | 6 | 8 | 15 | 21 | −6 | 16 | |
| 18 | Taubaté | 19 | 4 | 7 | 8 | 21 | 25 | −4 | 15 | |
| 19 | Noroeste | 19 | 4 | 6 | 9 | 14 | 20 | −6 | 14 | |
| 20 | América | 19 | 3 | 8 | 8 | 12 | 21 | −9 | 14 | |

Updated to match(es) played on October 18, 1981. Source: RSSSF.com
Rules for classification: 1) points; 2) wins; 3) goal difference; 4) number of goals scored.

==== Final phase ====
===== Group White =====
| Pos | Team | Pld | W | D | L | GF | GA | GD | Pts | Qualification or relegation |
|---|---|---|---|---|---|---|---|---|---|---|
| 1 | São Paulo | 6 | 3 | 2 | 1 | 6 | 3 | +3 | 8 | Qualified |
| 2 | Guarani | 6 | 2 | 4 | 0 | 9 | 5 | +4 | 8 | |
| 3 | Corinthians | 6 | 2 | 3 | 1 | 5 | 4 | +1 | 7 | |
| 4 | XV de Jaú | 6 | 0 | 1 | 5 | 3 | 11 | −8 | 1 | |

Updated to match(es) played on November 15, 1981. Source: RSSSF.com
Rules for classification: 1) points; 2) wins; 3) goal difference; 4) number of goals scored.

===== Group Black =====
| Pos | Team | Pld | W | D | L | GF | GA | GD | Pts | Qualification or relegation |
|---|---|---|---|---|---|---|---|---|---|---|
| 1 | São José | 6 | 2 | 3 | 1 | 5 | 3 | +2 | 7 | Qualified |
| 2 | Palmeiras | 6 | 2 | 3 | 1 | 5 | 4 | +1 | 7 | |
| 3 | Santos | 6 | 1 | 3 | 2 | 7 | 8 | −1 | 5 | |
| 4 | Ponte Preta | 6 | 1 | 3 | 2 | 2 | 4 | −2 | 5 | |

Updated to match(es) played on November 15, 1981. Source: RSSSF.com
Rules for classification: 1) points; 2) wins; 3) goal difference; 4) number of goals scored.

==== Second round finals ====
| Team 1 | Agg. | Team 2 | 1st leg | 2nd leg |
|---|---|---|---|---|
| São José | 3–3 | São Paulo | 1–0 | 2–3 |

=== Finals ===
| Team 1 | Agg. | Team 2 | 1st leg | 2nd leg |
|---|---|---|---|---|
| São Paulo | 3–1 | Ponte Preta | 1–1 | 2–0 |

=== Aggregate table ===
| Pos | Team | Pld | W | D | L | GF | GA | GD | Pts | Qualification or relegation |
|---|---|---|---|---|---|---|---|---|---|---|
| 1 | Ponte Preta | 38 | 18 | 15 | 5 | 60 | 33 | +27 | 51 | 1982 Taça de Ouro |
| 2 | Guarani | 38 | 18 | 13 | 7 | 70 | 46 | +24 | 49 | Qualified to 1982 Taça de Ouro as Taça de Prata champion |
| 3 | São Paulo | 38 | 18 | 8 | 12 | 58 | 32 | +26 | 44 | 1982 Taça de Ouro |
| 4 | Santos | 38 | 16 | 11 | 11 | 47 | 35 | +12 | 43 | 1982 Taça de Ouro |
| 5 | XV de Jaú | 38 | 14 | 15 | 9 | 44 | 33 | +11 | 43 | 1982 Taça de Ouro |
| 6 | Inter de Limeira | 38 | 14 | 14 | 10 | 43 | 36 | +7 | 42 | 1982 Taça de Ouro |
| 7 | São José | 38 | 14 | 14 | 10 | 40 | 40 | 0 | 42 | 1982 Taça de Ouro |
| 8 | Corinthians | 38 | 13 | 14 | 11 | 51 | 43 | +8 | 40 | 1982 Taça de Prata |
| 9 | Portuguesa | 38 | 13 | 14 | 11 | 35 | 33 | +2 | 40 | 1982 Taça de Prata |
| 10 | Palmeiras | 38 | 10 | 19 | 9 | 42 | 44 | −2 | 39 | 1982 Taça de Prata |
| 11 | Botafogo | 38 | 14 | 10 | 14 | 31 | 36 | −5 | 38 | 1982 Taça de Prata |
| 12 | Juventus | 38 | 11 | 16 | 11 | 43 | 32 | +11 | 38 | 1982 Taça de Prata |
| 13 | Comercial | 38 | 12 | 11 | 15 | 35 | 57 | −22 | 35 | |
| 14 | Taubaté | 38 | 10 | 13 | 15 | 47 | 51 | −4 | 33 | |
| 15 | América | 38 | 8 | 17 | 13 | 23 | 35 | −12 | 33 | |
| 16 | Ferroviária | 38 | 9 | 14 | 15 | 37 | 51 | −14 | 32 | |
| 17 | Francana | 38 | 8 | 15 | 15 | 38 | 53 | −15 | 31 | |
| 18 | Marília | 38 | 8 | 14 | 16 | 28 | 43 | −15 | 30 | |
| 19 | São Bento | 38 | 6 | 18 | 14 | 26 | 46 | −20 | 30 | Relegation Playoff |
| 20 | Noroeste | 38 | 8 | 10 | 20 | 24 | 42 | −18 | 26 | Relegated |

Updated to match(es) played on October 18, 1981. Source: RSSSF.com
Rules for classification: 1) points; 2) wins; 3) goal difference; 4) number of goals scored.

Much like in the previous year, the team with the fewest points would be relegated and the team with the second-fewest points would go to a playoff against the runner-up of the Second Level. only the results of the regular phases were counted. as such, Noroeste was relegated and São Bento had to dispute a playoff in neutral ground against XV de Piracicaba.

==== Relegation Playoffs ====
| Team 1 | Series | Team 2 | Game 1 | Game 2 | Game 3 |
|---|---|---|---|---|---|
| XV de Piracicaba | 3–3 | São Bento | 1–0 | 0–1 | 0-0 (1-3 pen.) |
