= Joaquinzão =

Soccer stadium in Brazil

Coordinates: 23.02784°S 45.57054°W

Joaquinzão, also known as Estádio Joaquim de Morais Filho, is a multi-use stadium located in Taubaté, Brazil. It is used mostly for football matches and hosts the home matches of Esporte Clube Taubaté. The stadium has a maximum capacity of 9,600 people and was built in 1968.

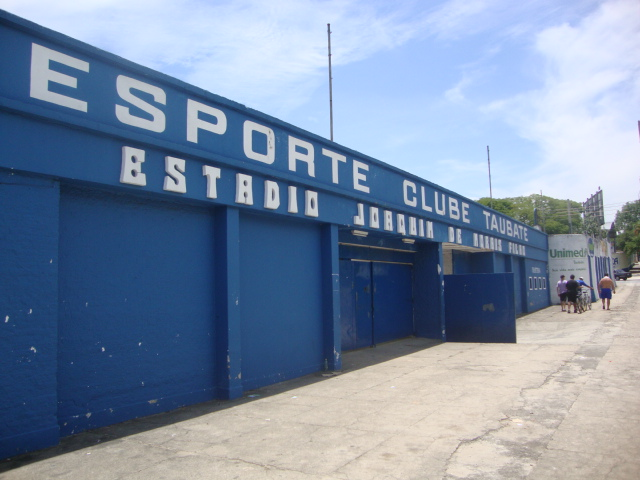
Joaquinzão
