= Leila Pereira =

Brazilian businesswoman, president of Palmeiras (born 1964)

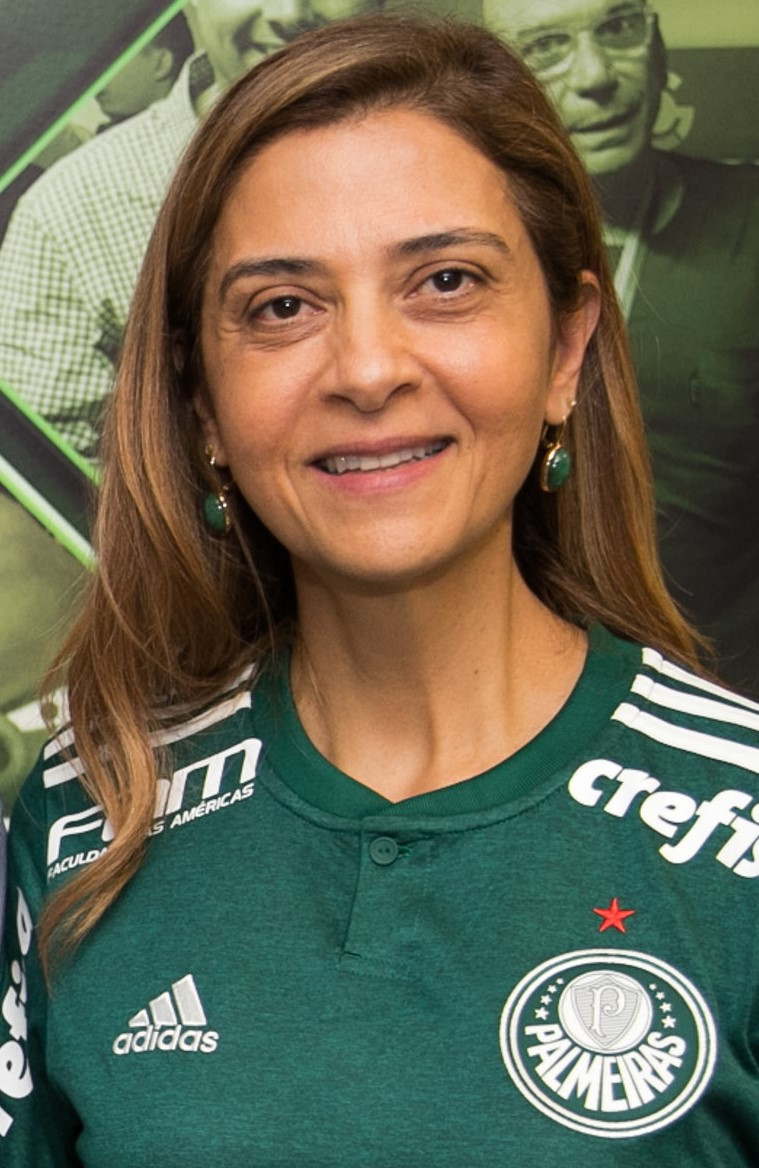
- Pereira in 2018

56th President of Palmeiras
- Incumbent
- Assumed office 15 December 2021
- Preceded by: Maurício Galiotte

Personal details
- Born: Leila Mejdalani Pereira; 11 November 1964 (age 61) Cambuci, Rio de Janeiro, Brazil
- Spouse: José Roberto Lamacchia
- Education: Cândido Mendes University
- Occupation: Businesswomen, lawyer, journalist, sports club president

Leila Mejdalani Pereira (born 11 November 1964) is a Brazilian businesswoman, lawyer, journalist and sports director. She ran the financial company Crefisa and is known for her activities at association football club Sociedade Esportiva Palmeiras, of which she has been president since 2021.

At Palmeiras, Pereira became the club's sponsor through Crefisa and Faculdade das Américas (FAM). The partnership began in 2015, and Pereira became an advisor to the club, becoming president.

Since the beginning of the partnership with Crefisa, Palmeiras has won two Copa Libertadores da América titles, and three Campeonato Brasileiro titles.

In 2022, Forbes listed Pereira as the fifth richest woman in Brazil, with an estimated net worth of around 8 billion reais.

== Personal life ==
Pereira was born on 11 November 1964 in Cambuci and raised in Cabo Frio, Rio de Janeiro, being the daughter of a middle-class family. Against her father's wishes and with her mother's support, later she moved to Rio de Janeiro to attend college.

She studied journalism at Estácio de Sá University and had an internship at Rede Manchete. She had her first introduction to sport when she participated in the coverage of the 1990 FIFA World Cup.

While she was studying journalism, Pereira met a businessman, José Roberto Lamacchia, the founder of Crefisa.

She began studying law, graduating from Cândido Mendes University. She moved to São Paulo in 1996 and attempted new career path as a judge, but failed the public exam and ended up opening a law office. Pereira and José Roberto Lamacchia got married in 1999.

=== Partnership with Palmeiras ===
Pereira started sponsoring Palmeiras in 2015. One of the first big moves in Crefisa's sponsorship of the club was the signing of striker Dudu, bought for approximately 35 million reais thanks to a contribution from the finance company.

In 2017, she became an advisor to the club. Thanks to a letter from former president Mustafá Contursi, she was qualified to compete for one of the vacancies. With 250 votes, she was the most voted in the election for the Palmeiras board.

To continue with a good relationship, Crefisa transferred 70 tickets to Contursi. However, in 2017, prosecutors suspected that these tickets were being sold, which would be illegal. The case ended up being closed due to lack of evidence, but the relationship between Contursi and Crefisa was broken.

=== Club presidency ===
On 20 November 2021, in a vote with a single ticket, Pereira was elected the 56th president in the club's history, being the first woman – she received 1,897 votes from members out of a total of 2,141.

Shortly after winning the presidency, Pereira celebrated another title for Palmeiras: the 2021 Copa Libertadores da América. Pereira's term at the helm of the club began on 15 December 2021.

In her first year as a president, Palmeiras achieved 2022 Campeonato Brasileiro, the Recopa Sudamericana and the Campeonato Paulista. In the women's category, Alviverde won the Libertadores and the Campeonato Paulista. The club was also successful at the youth level, with titles in the São Paulo Junior Football Cup, the Brazilian Under-20 Championship and the Brazilian Under-17 Championship.

==== Palmeiras' supporter protests ====
Pereira became the target of protests from Palmeiras fans, mainly from Mancha Alviverde. The manager's bad relationship with the organized fans began in the first months of Leila's management at Palmeiras, after the president did not respond to the fans' desire to change the reserved place at Allianz Parque. In 2023, Pereira was criticized for the delay in hiring reinforcements for the season. In June, fans mocked the director's purchase of the plane during a protest in front of Crefisa's headquarters.

==== Purchase of Arena Barueri ====
On 24 October 2023, Crefipar, Pereira's company, won the concession to manage Arena Barueri. Leila stated that the company will invest up to $100 million over the next 35 years, becoming the venue for Palmeiras games when Allianz Parque is not available.
