= Esporte Clube Taubaté =

Taubaté
- Full name: Esporte Clube Taubaté
- Nicknames: Burro da Central; Alvi Azul
- Founded: November 1, 1914
- Ground: Joaquinzão
- Capacity: 9,600
- Chairman: Eduardo Cursino
- Manager: Toninho Cecílio
- League: Campeonato Paulista Série A2
- 2025: Paulista Série A2, 4th of 16
Home colors	Away colors

Esporte Clube Taubaté, commonly referred to as Taubaté, is a professional association football club based in Taubaté, São Paulo, Brazil. The team competes in Campeonato Paulista Série A2, the second tier of the São Paulo state football league.

The club's home colours are blue and white and the team mascot is a donkey.

== History ==
=== Founding ===
The idea of founding a football club in Taubaté appeared when the football fans José Pedro de Oliveira, Jayme Tindal and Frederico Livrero had a meeting at Associação Comercial, and they decided to study the viability of founding a football club in the city. At that meeting they decided that the name of the club would be Sport Club Taubaté.

On October 25, 1914 ¡, the colors of the club were officially chosen: blue and white. On November 1, 1914, the club was founded as Sport Club Taubaté.

=== First match ===
The first match of the club was on December 25, 1914, against AA Palmeiras at Estádio da Praça Monsenhor Silva Barros (known also as Campo do Bosque) in Taubaté. The match ended with a defeat by 1–6. The players of Taubaté were Paulinho, Luiz Simi, Paiva; Synésio, Sérgio Areão, Hugo; Paulo Silva, Waldemiro, Renato Granadeiro (captain), Abreu and Jacinto. Irito also played.

The club has won the Campeonato Paulista Série A2 a record 6 times.

== Honours ==
=== Official tournaments ===
State
Competitions	Titles	Seasons
Campeonato Paulista Série A2	6^{s}	1918, 1926, 1928, 1942, 1954, 1979
Campeonato Paulista Série A3	2	2003, 2015

- record
- ^{s} shared record

=== Others tournaments ===
==== State ====
- Copa Vale do Paraíba (2): 1986 and 1987

==== City ====
- Campeonato Amador da Primeira Divisão de Taubaté (3): 1951, 1959, 1961

=== Runners-up ===
- Campeonato Paulista Série A2 (3): 1947, 1963, 2004
- Campeonato Paulista Série A3 (1): 1998

== Rivalries ==
Taubaté has a fierce rivalry with São José. 1979 Campeonato Paulista second division final match was an epic match between them. Another rival of Taubaté is Guaratinguetá.

== Symbols and colors ==
The club's mascot is a donkey, known as Burro da Central (burro means donkey in Portuguese). In 1954, the club played the Campeonato Paulista second division final against Comercial of Ribeirão Preto and fielded an ineligible player in the match. Because of this mistake, the press of São Paulo nicknamed the club Burro (Donkey) not just meaning for donkey but for being dumb because of this mistake.

The blue color of the club represents the infinity of the sky, and the white color represents peace.

== See also ==
- São José Esporte Clube and Esporte Clube Taubaté football rivalry
