= São Paulo State Government =

Subdivision of the Brazilian government

- Flag of the Governor of the State of São Paulo

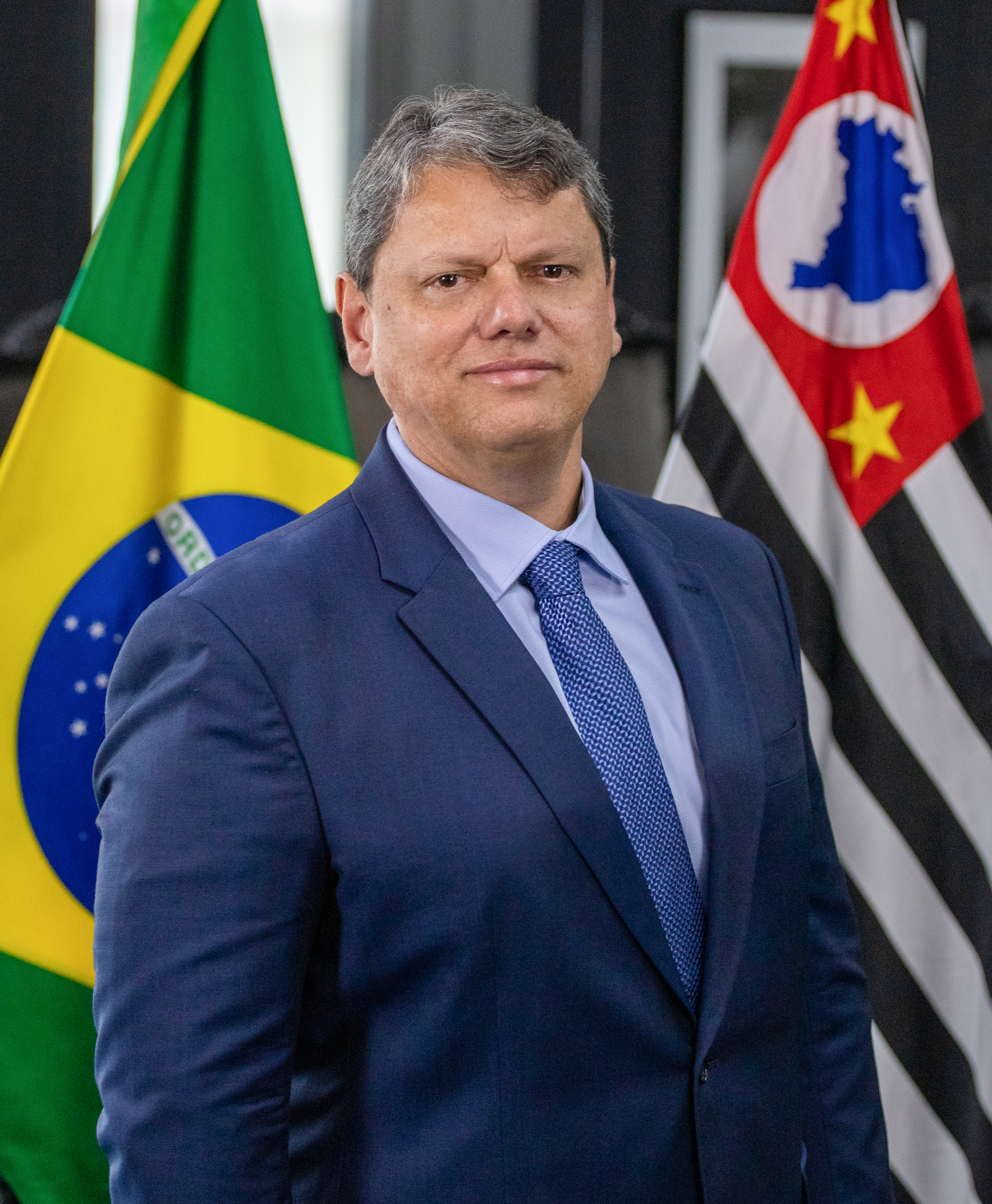
- Incumbent; Tarcísio Gomes de Freitas since January 1st, 2023
- Seat: Bandeirantes Palace

The São Paulo State Government is based in the city of São Paulo and covers the state's administrative structure, as established by the Federal and State Constitutions. It is composed of three powers: the Executive, the Legislative and the Judiciary. The governor commands the state executive, the legislature consists of the Legislative Assembly of São Paulo (Portuguese: Assembleia Legislativa do Estado de São Paulo - ALESP) and the judiciary is headed by the Court of Justice of São Paulo (Tribunal de Justiça de São Paulo).

== Executive ==
São Paulo's executive branch is headed by the governor. Since 1965, it has been based in the Bandeirantes Palace, built in the 1950s in Morumbi. The governor and vice-governor are elected by universal suffrage and direct and secret ballot by the population for 4-year terms, with the possibility of re-election for another consecutive term. Eligibility requirements for both positions are Brazilian nationality, exercise of political rights, electoral domicile in the state, party membership and a minimum age of 30. The state elections are held simultaneously with the federal elections.

The current governor is Tarcísio Gomes de Freitas. As the highest representative of the executive branch, he is responsible for sanctioning and vetoing laws passed by the legislature, organizing and running the administration, issuing decrees and acting as commander-in-chief of the Military Police, Civil Police and Military Fire Brigade. The vice-governor is the second highest position in the executive branch and can replace the governor when he is unable to perform his duties. According to the State Constitution, he will assist the governor whenever he is summoned by him for special missions. The position is currently held by Felicio Ramuth.

The governor is assisted by the secretaries in the administration of the state. They are appointed and dismissed as the governor decides, but appointments must meet three requirements: the exercise of political rights, Brazilian nationality and a minimum age of 21. There is no minimum or maximum number of secretaries; the current system consists of 24 departments.

=== Direct administration ===
==== Cabinet ====
It is currently composed of 24 secretariats and a special department:

Department	Secretary	Photo
Secretariat of Education (Secretaria de Educação)	Renato Feder	
Secretariat of Health (Secretaria de Saúde)	Eleuses Paiva	
Secretariat for the Environment, Infrastructure and Logistics (Secretaria de Meio Ambiente, Infraestrutura e Logística)	Natália Resende	
Secretariat of Government and Institutional Relations (Secretaria de Governo e Relações Institucionais)	Gilberto Kassab	
Chief of Staff (Casa Civil)	Arthur Lima	
Secretariat of Public Security (Secretaria de Segurança Pública)	Guilherme Derrite	
Secretariat of Tourism and Travel (Secretaria de Turismo e Viagens)	Roberto de Lucena	
Secretariat of Management and Digital Government (Secretaria de Gestão e Governo Digital)	Caio Paes de Andrade	
Secretariat for Communication (Secretaria de Comunicação)	Lais Vita	
Secretariat for International Affairs (Secretaria de Negócios Internacionais)	Lucas Ferraz	
Secretariat for Partnerships in Investments (Secretaria de Parcerias em Investimentos)	Rafael Benini	
Secretariat of Finance and Planning (Secretaria de Fazenda e Planejamento)	Samuel Kinoshita	
Secretariat for Social Development (Secretaria de Desenvolvimento Social)	Gilberto Nascimento Júnior	
Secretariat of Penitentiary Administration (Secretaria de Administração Penitenciária)	Marcello Streifinger	
Secretariat for Economic Development (Secretaria de Desenvolvimento Econômico)	Jorge Lima	
Secretariat for Women's Policies (Secretaria de Políticas para as Mulheres)	Sonaira Fernandes	
Secretariat of Justice and Citizenship (Secretaria de Justiça e Cidadania)	Fábio Prieto	
Secretariat for Metropolitan Transport (Secretaria de Transportes Metropolitanos)	Marcos Assalve	
Secretariat for Urban Development and Housing (Secretaria de Desenvolvimento Urbano e Habitação)	Marcelo Branco	
Secretariat for Culture and Creative Economy (Secretaria de Cultura e Economia Criativa)	Marília Marton	
Secretariat of Agriculture and Supply (Secretaria de Agricultura e Abastecimento)	Antônio Junqueira	
Secretariat for Sport (Secretaria de Esportes)	Helena Reis	
Secretariat for Science, Technology and Innovation (Secretaria de Ciência, Tecnologia e Inovação)	Vahan Agopyan	
Secretariat for People with Disabilities (Secretaria de Pessoas com Deficiência)	Marcos da Costa	
Special Secretariat for Strategic Projects (Secretaria Especial de Projetos Estratégicos)	Guilherme Afif Domingos	

The cabinet also includes the Military House (Casa Militar), which is responsible for civil defense and the security of the seat of government and the governor himself.

==== Agencies linked to the State Secretariats ====
- São Paulo Agency for Agribusiness Technology (Agência Paulista de Tecnologia dos Agronegócios - APTA);
  - Agronomic Institute of Campinas (Instituto Agronômico de Campinas - IAC);
  - Biological Institute (Instituto Biológico - IB);
  - Institute of Agricultural Economics (Instituto de Economia Agrícola - IEA);
  - Fisheries Institute (Instituto de Pesca - IP);
  - Food Technology Institute (Instituto de Tecnologia de Alimentos - ITAL);
  - Institute of Zootechnics (Instituto de Zootecnia - IZ);
- Public Archives of the State of São Paulo (Arquivo Público do Estado de São Paulo - APESP);
- Coordination of Integral Technical Assistance (Coordenadoria de Assistência Técnica Integral);
- Council for the Defense of Historical, Archaeological, Artistic and Tourist Heritage (Conselho de Defesa do Patrimônio Histórico, Arqueológico, Artístico e Turístico - Condephaat);
- São Paulo State Civil Defense (Defesa Civil do Estado de São Paulo);
- Dante Pazzanese Institute of Cardiology (Instituto Dante Pazzanese de Cardiologia - IDPC);
- Butantan Institute (Instituto Butantan);
- Environmental Research Institute (Instituto de Pesquisas Ambientais - IPA);
- Adolfo Lutz Institute (Instituto Adolfo Lutz);
- Geographic and Cartographic Institute of São Paulo (Instituto Geográfico e Cartográfico de São Paulo - IGCSP);
- Lauro de Souza Lima Institute (Instituto Lauro de Souza Lima - ILSL);
- Pasteur Institute (Instituto Pasteur);
- Health Institute (Instituto de Saúde);
- Investment Promotion and Competitiveness Agency of São Paulo (Agência Paulista de Promoção de Investimentos e Competitividade - InvestSP);
- Technical and Scientific Police Superintendence (Superintendência de Polícia Técnico-Científica - SPTC);
- Civil Police of the State of São Paulo (Polícia Civil do Estado de São Paulo);
- Military Police of the State of São Paulo (Polícia Militar do Estado de São Paulo);
  - Fire Department of the Military Police of the State of São Paulo (Corpo de Bombeiros da Polícia Militar do Estado de São Paulo - CBMESP);
  - Highway Police of the State of São Paulo (Polícia Rodoviária do Estado de São Paulo);
  - Community Safety Councils (Conselhos Comunitários de Segurança - CONSEG).

=== Indirect administration ===
==== Autarchies ====
- Metropolitan Agency of Baixada Santista (Agência Metropolitana da Baixada Santista - AGEM);
- Metropolitan Agency of Campinas (Agência Metropolitana de Campinas - AGEMCAMP);
- Metropolitan Agency of the Paraíba Valley and North Coast (Agência Metropolitana do Vale do Paraíba e Litoral Norte - AGEMVALE);
- Sanitation and Energy Regulatory Agency of the State of São Paulo (Agência Reguladora de Saneamento e Energia do Estado de São Paulo - ARSESP);
- Regulatory Agency for Delegated Public Transportation Services of the State of São Paulo (Agência Reguladora de Serviços Públicos Delegados de Transporte do Estado de São Paulo - ARTESP);
- Military Police Benevolent Fund (Caixa Beneficente da Polícia Militar - CPBM);
- Paula Souza State Center for Technological Education (Centro Estadual de Educação Tecnológica Paula Souza - CEETEPS);
  - State Technical School (Escola Técnica Estadual - ETECs);
  - São Paulo State Technological Colleges (Faculdades de Tecnologia do Estado de São Paulo - FATECs);
- Department of Water and Electricity (Departamento de Águas e Energia Elétrica - DAEE);
- Highway Department of the State of São Paulo (Departamento de Estradas de Rodagem do Estado de São Paulo - DER/SP);
- Traffic Department of the State of São Paulo (Departamento Estadual de Trânsito de São Paulo - DETRAN/SP);
- School of Medicine of Marília (Faculdade de Medicina de Marília - FAMEMA);
- School of Medicine of São José do Rio Preto (Faculdade de Medicina de São José do Rio Preto - FAMERP);
- Botucatu School of Medicine Teaching Hospital (Hospital das Clínicas da Faculdade de Medicina de Botucatu - HC Botucatu);
- Marília School of Medicine Teaching Hospital (Hospital das Clínicas da Faculdade de Medicina de Marília - HC Famema);
- Ribeirão Preto Teaching Hospital (Hospital das Clínicas de Ribeirão Preto - HC/USP RP);
- University of São Paulo School of Medicine Teaching Hospital (Hospital das Clínicas da Faculdade de Medicina da Universidade de São Paulo - HC/USP SP);
- Institute of Social Medicine and Criminology of São Paulo (Instituto de Medicina Social e de Criminologia de São Paulo - IMESC);
- Institute of Medical Assistance to State Public Servants of São Paulo (Instituto de Assistência Médica ao Servidor Público Estadual de São Paulo - IAMSPE);
- Nuclear and Energy Research Institute (Instituto de Pesquisas Energéticas e Nucleares - IPEN/CNEN);
- Regulatory Agency of the State of São Paulo (Instituto de Pesos e Medidas do Estado de São Paulo - IPEM);
- São Paulo State Social Security Institute (Instituto de Previdência do Estado de São Paulo - IPESP);
- Commercial Council of the State of São Paulo (Junta Comercial do Estado de São Paulo - JUCESP);
- São Paulo Social Security (São Paulo Previdência - SPPREV);
- São Paulo State University (Universidade Estadual Paulista - UNESP);
- Campinas State University (Universidade Estadual de Campinas - UNICAMP);
- University of São Paulo (Universidade de São Paulo - USP).

==== Public companies ====
- Companhia de Desenvolvimento Habitacional e Urbano do Estado de São Paulo (CDHU);
- Companhia Ambiental do Estado de São Paulo (CETESB);
- Companhia Docas de São Sebastião (CDSS);
- Companhia de Seguros do Estado de São Paulo (COSESP);
- Companhia Paulista de Parcerias (CPP);
- Companhia Paulista de Securitização (CPESC);
- Companhia Paulista de Trens Metropolitanos (CPTM);
- Desenvolve São Paulo (DESENVOLVE SP);
- Empresa Metropolitana de Águas e Energia (EMAE);
- Empresa Metropolitana de Transportes Urbanos de São Paulo (EMTU);
- Companhia do Metropolitano de São Paulo (CMSP);
- Instituto de Pesquisas Tecnológicas (IPT);
- Companhia de Processamento de Dados do Estado de São Paulo (PRODESP);
  - Poupatempo;
- Companhia de Saneamento Básico do Estado de São Paulo S.A. (SABESP).

==== Foundations ====
- São Paulo State Research Foundation (Fundação de Amparo à Pesquisa do Estado de São Paulo - FAPESP);
- Educational Development Foundation (Fundação para o Desenvolvimento da Educação - FDE);
- Professor Doctor Manoel Pedro Pimentel Prisoner Support Foundation (Fundação de Amparo ao Preso Professor Doutor Manoel Pedro Pimentel - FUNAP);
- Center for Socio-Educational Assistance to Adolescents Foundation - CASA Foundation (Fundação Centro de Atendimento Socioeducativo ao Adolescente - Fundação CASA);
- Foundation for Conservation and Forestry Production of the State of São Paulo - Forestry Foundation (Fundação para a Conservação e a Produção Florestal do Estado de São Paulo - Fundação Florestal);
- São Paulo State Land Institute (Instituto de Terras do Estado de São Paulo - ITESP);
- Father Anchieta Foundation (Fundação Padre Anchieta);
- Consumer Protection and Defense Foundation (Fundação de Proteção e Defesa do Consumidor - PROCON);
- People's Medicine Foundation (Fundação para o Remédio Popular - FURP);
- Latin America Memorial (Memorial da América Latina);
- São Paulo Cancer Center Foundation (Fundação Oncocentro de São Paulo);
- Pro-Blood Foundation (Fundação Pró-Sangue);
- State System for Data Analysis Foundation - SEADE Foundation (Fundação Sistema Estadual de Análise de Dados - Fundação SEADE);
- São Paulo State Supplementary Pension Foundation (Fundação de Previdência Complementar do Estado de São Paulo - SP/PREVCOM);
- São Paulo Zoo (Parque Zoológico de São Paulo);
- Virtual University of the State of São Paulo (Universidade Virtual do Estado de São Paulo - UNIVESP).

== Legislative ==
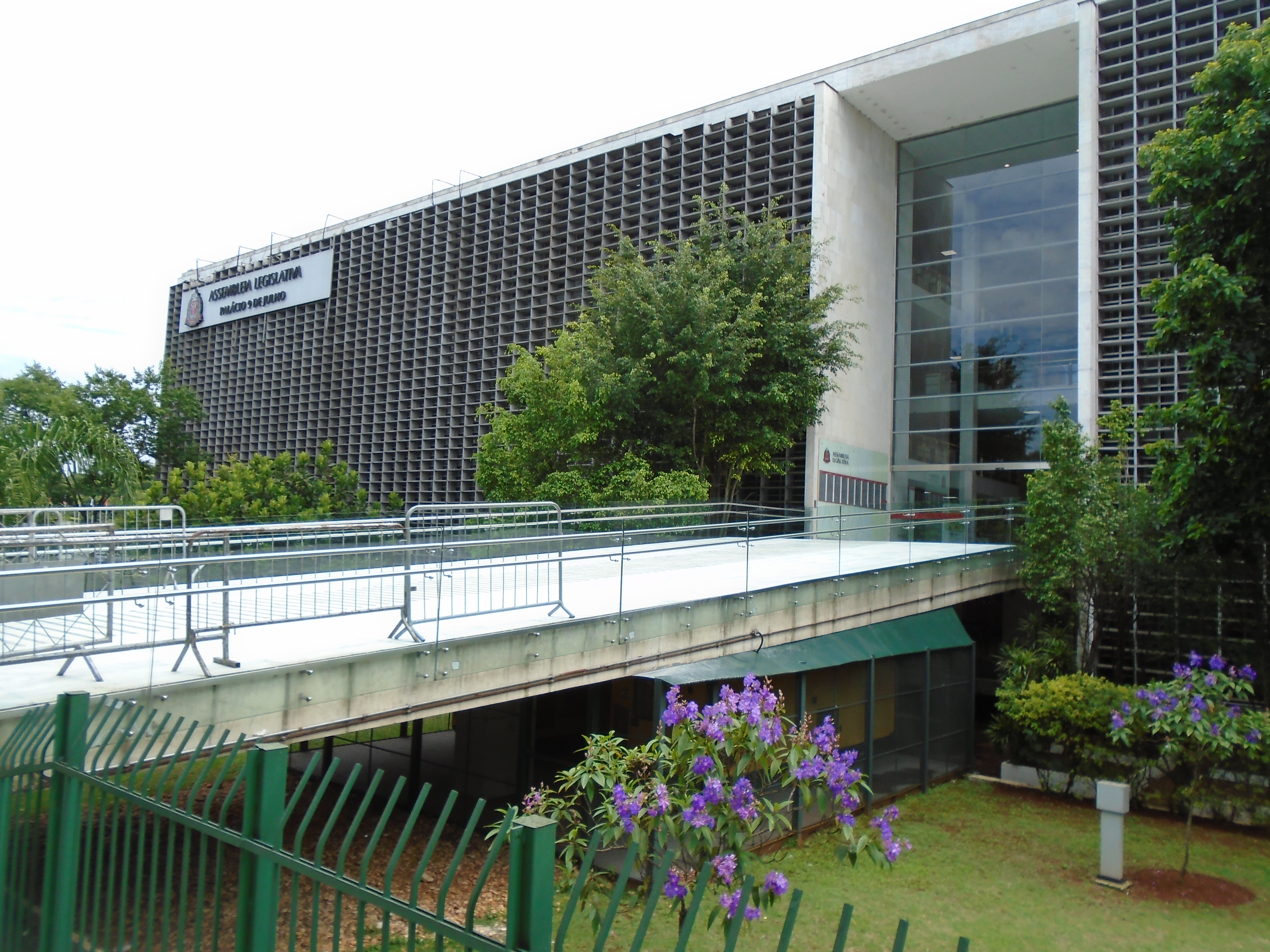
9 de Julho Palace, in 2016.

The legislature is unicameral and exercised by the Legislative Assembly of São Paulo, formed by 94 state deputies and based at the 9 de Julho Palace. ALESP drafts and votes on bills and supervises the actions of the executive through the Court of Accounts of São Paulo (Tribunal de Contas do Estado de São Paulo - TCE/SP), an external control agency. The legislative is also responsible for deciding on the budget, the creation and extinction of public offices, as well as setting their salaries and benefits, and for judging the governor in impeachment proceedings.

State deputies are elected using the proportional representation system simultaneously with the state and federal elections. The terms of office are 4 years and there are no re-election limits. The eligibility criteria are the same as for governor and vice-governor, except for the minimum age of 21. The inauguration of elected representatives takes place on March 15.

=== Board of directors ===
State deputies elect the board of directors of the Legislative Assembly. Voting is open and terms of office are two years, with members not being able to hold the same positions on successive boards in the same legislature. It is composed of three deputies (president, first and second secretaries) and six substitutes. The current board of directors chosen in March 2023 is formed by:

- André do Prado: president;
- Teonílio Barba: first secretary;
- Rogério Nogueira: second secretary;
- Gilmaci Santos: first vice-president;
- Milton Leite Filho: second vice-president;
- Helinho Zanatta: third vice-president;
- Rafael Silva: fourth vice-president;
- Léo Oliveira: third secretary;
- Gil Diniz: fourth secretary.

== Judiciary ==
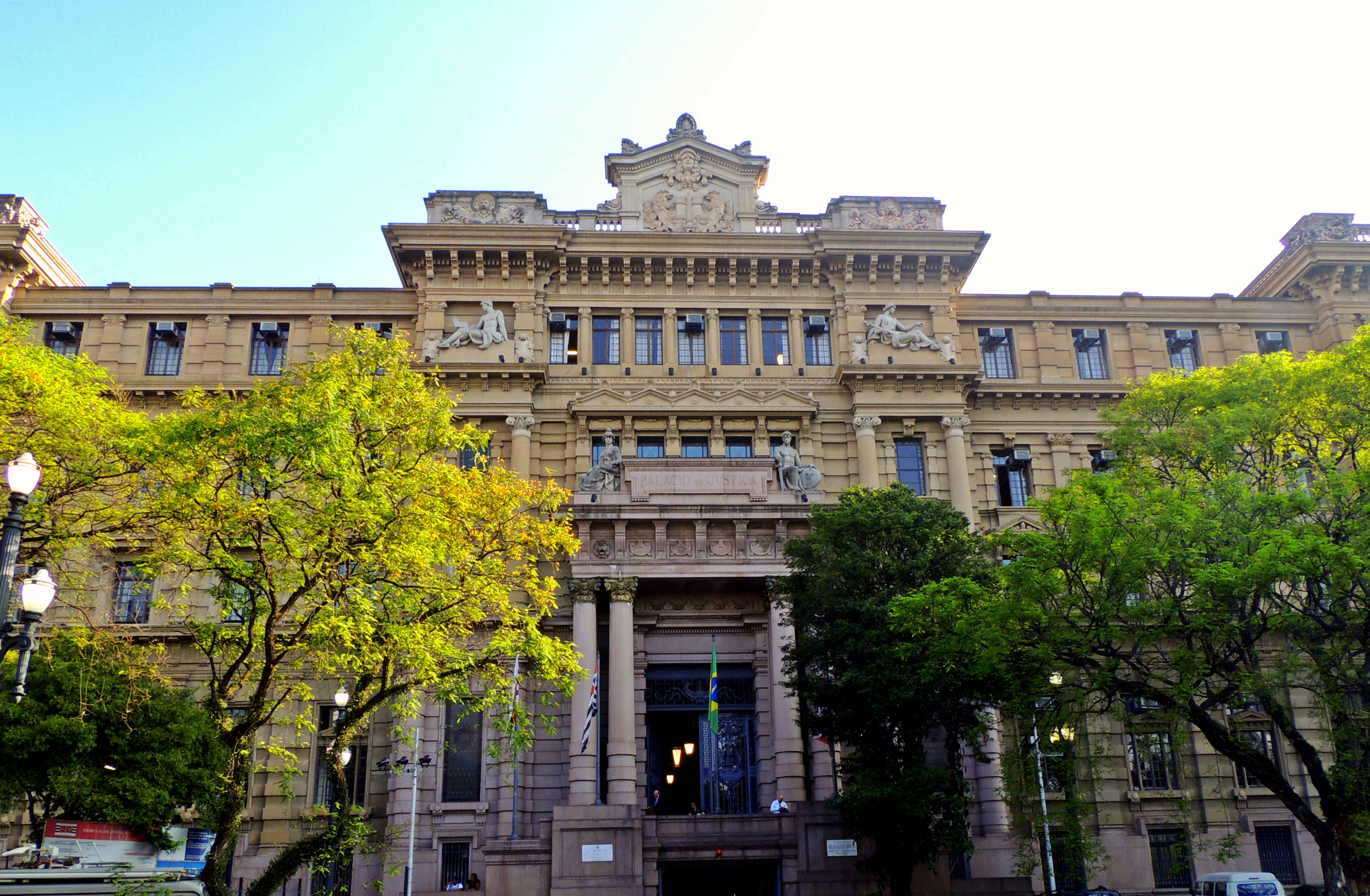
The Palace of Justice, seat of the Court of Justice, in 2016.

The judiciary interprets and applies the law. It has a hierarchical structure headed by the Court of Justice of São Paulo. Decisions can be appealed to the Superior Court of Justice (Superior Tribunal de Justiça - STJ) and the Supreme Federal Court (Supremo Tribunal Federal - STF). The first instance comprises 2,600 judges in 319 comarcas and the second has 360 judges. The court is led by a president, elected by the judges for two-year terms; Fernando Antonio Torres Garcia is the incumbent president.

== See also ==
- List of governors of São Paulo
- São Paulo Municipal Government
