= Marília =

- Municipality
- Municipality of Marília
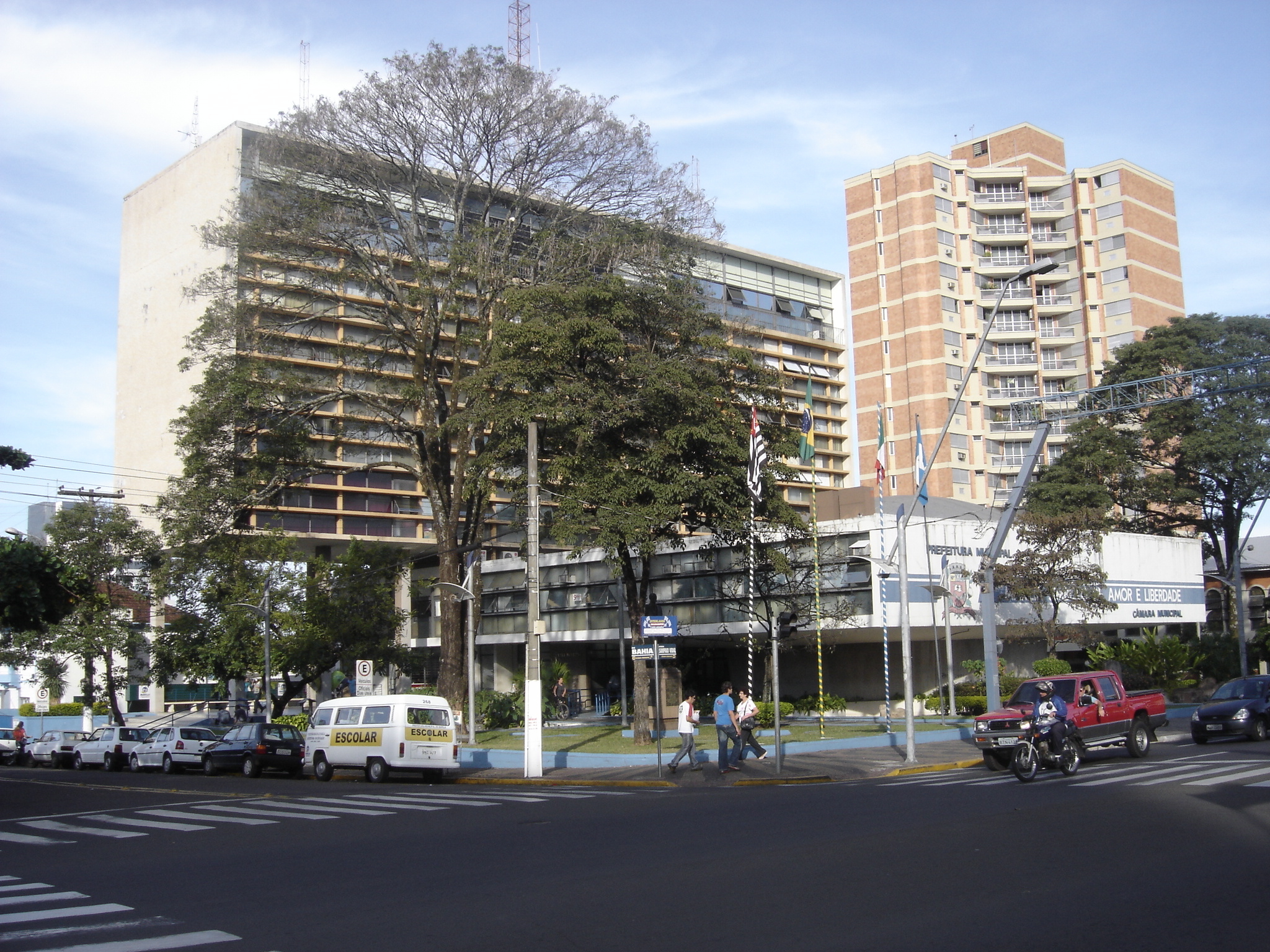
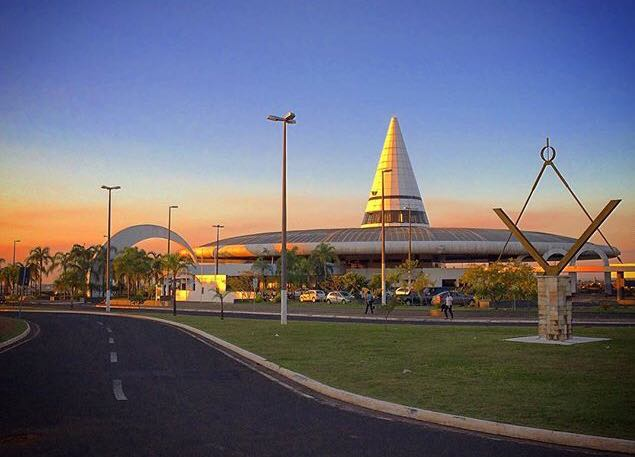
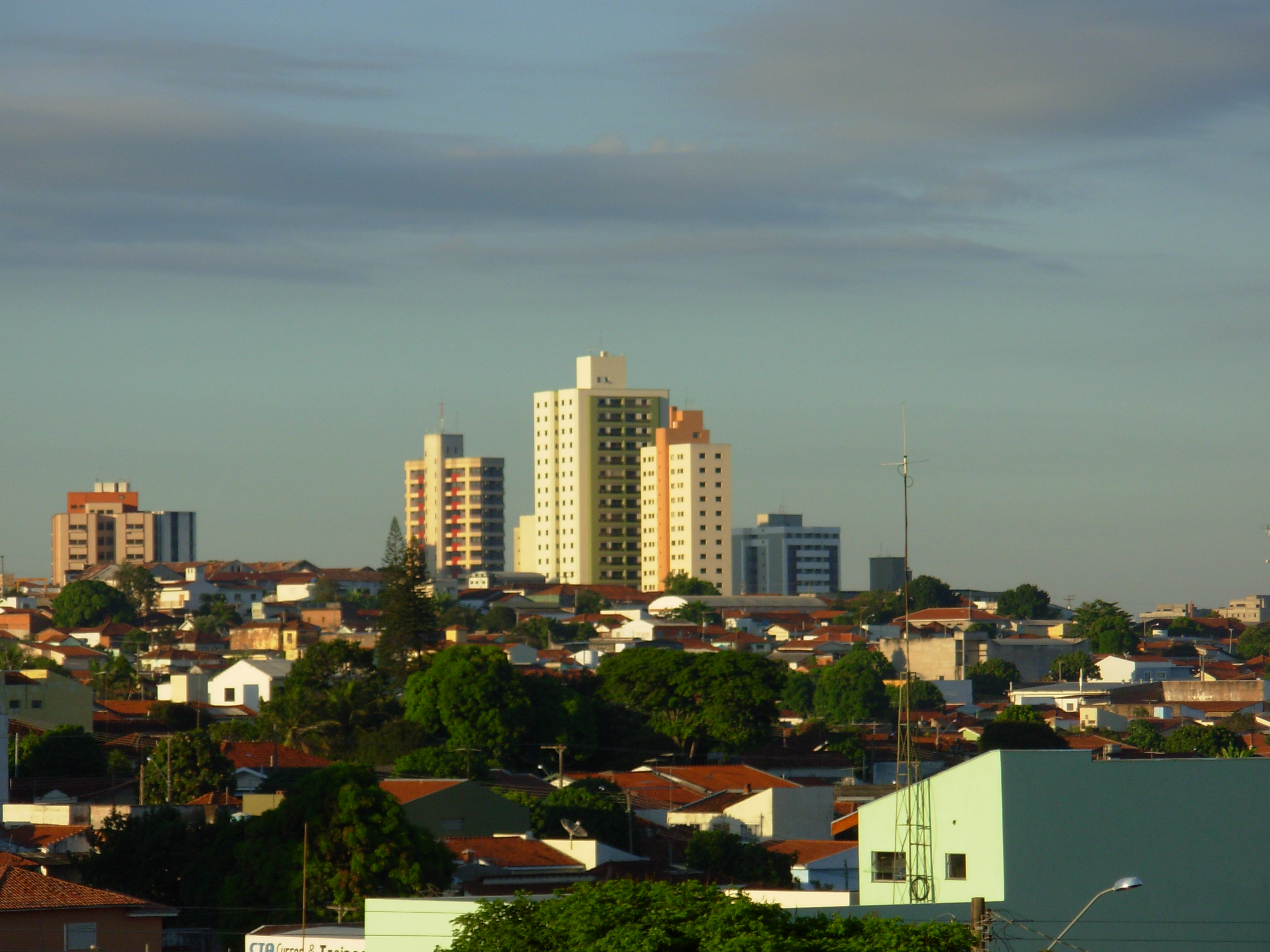
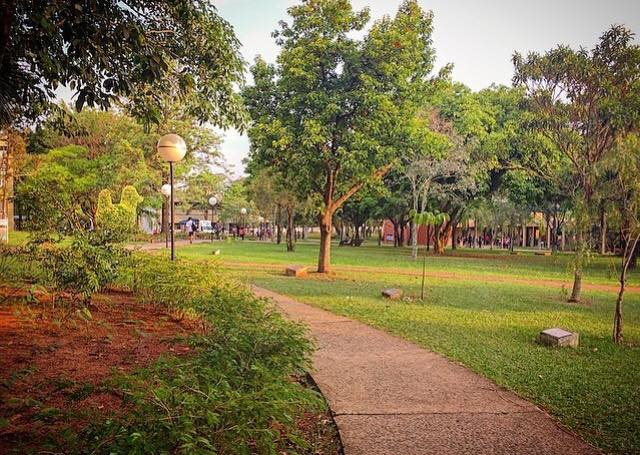
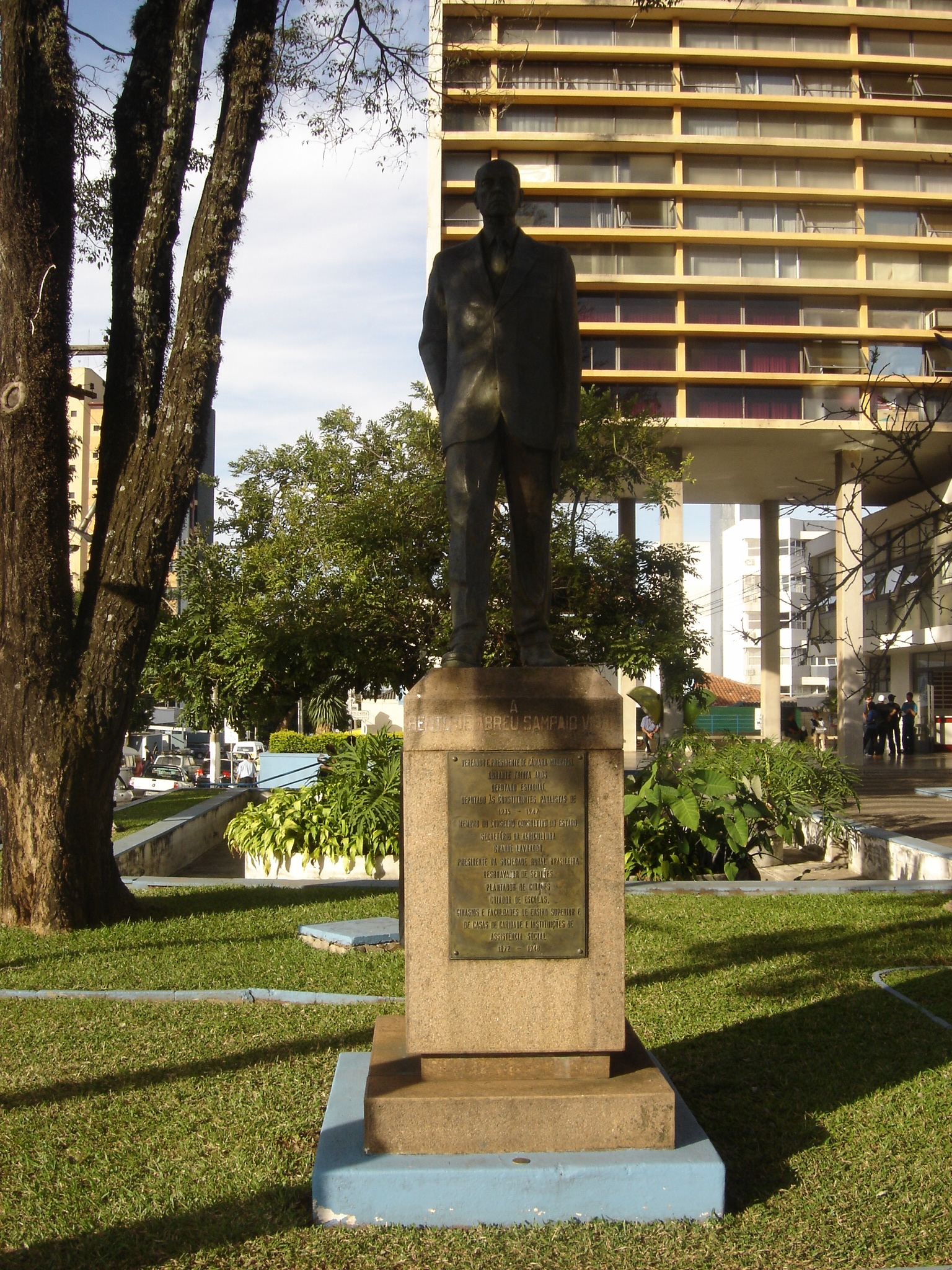
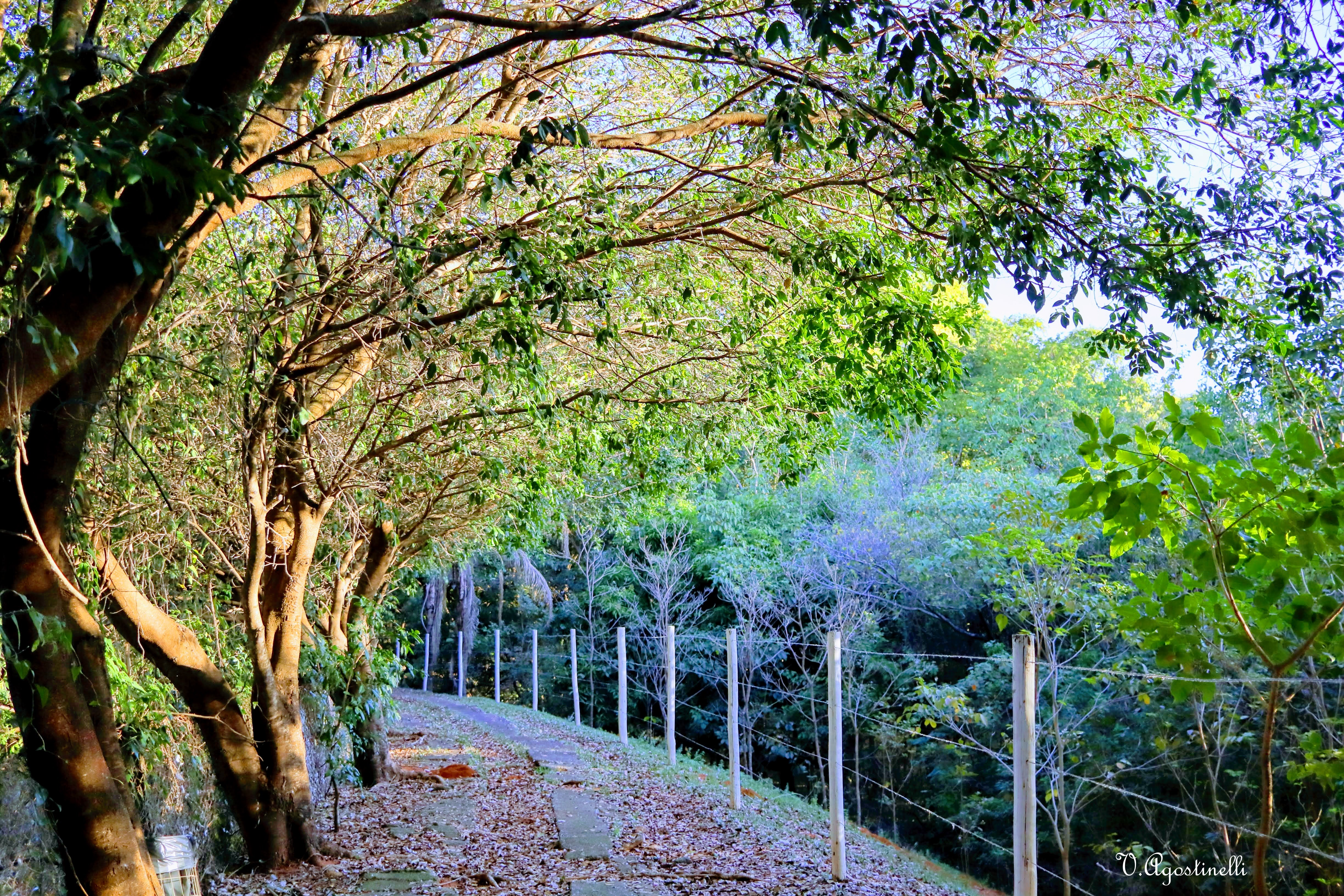
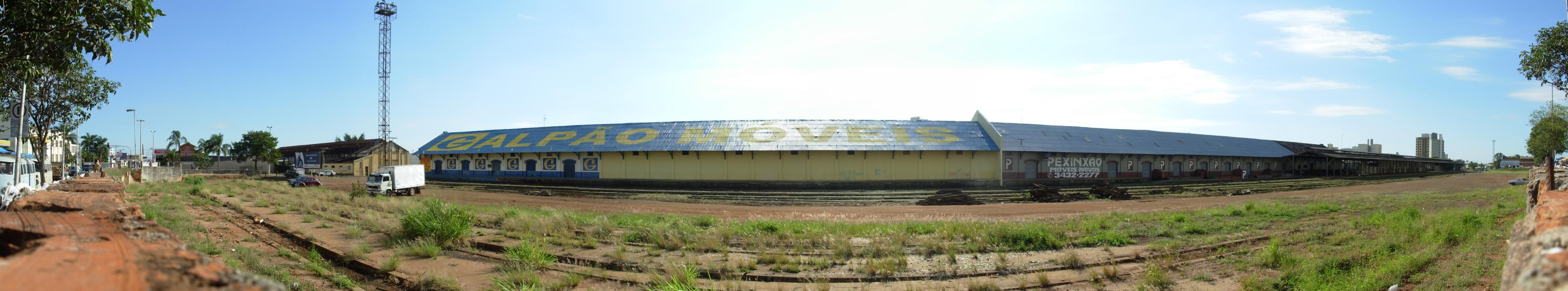

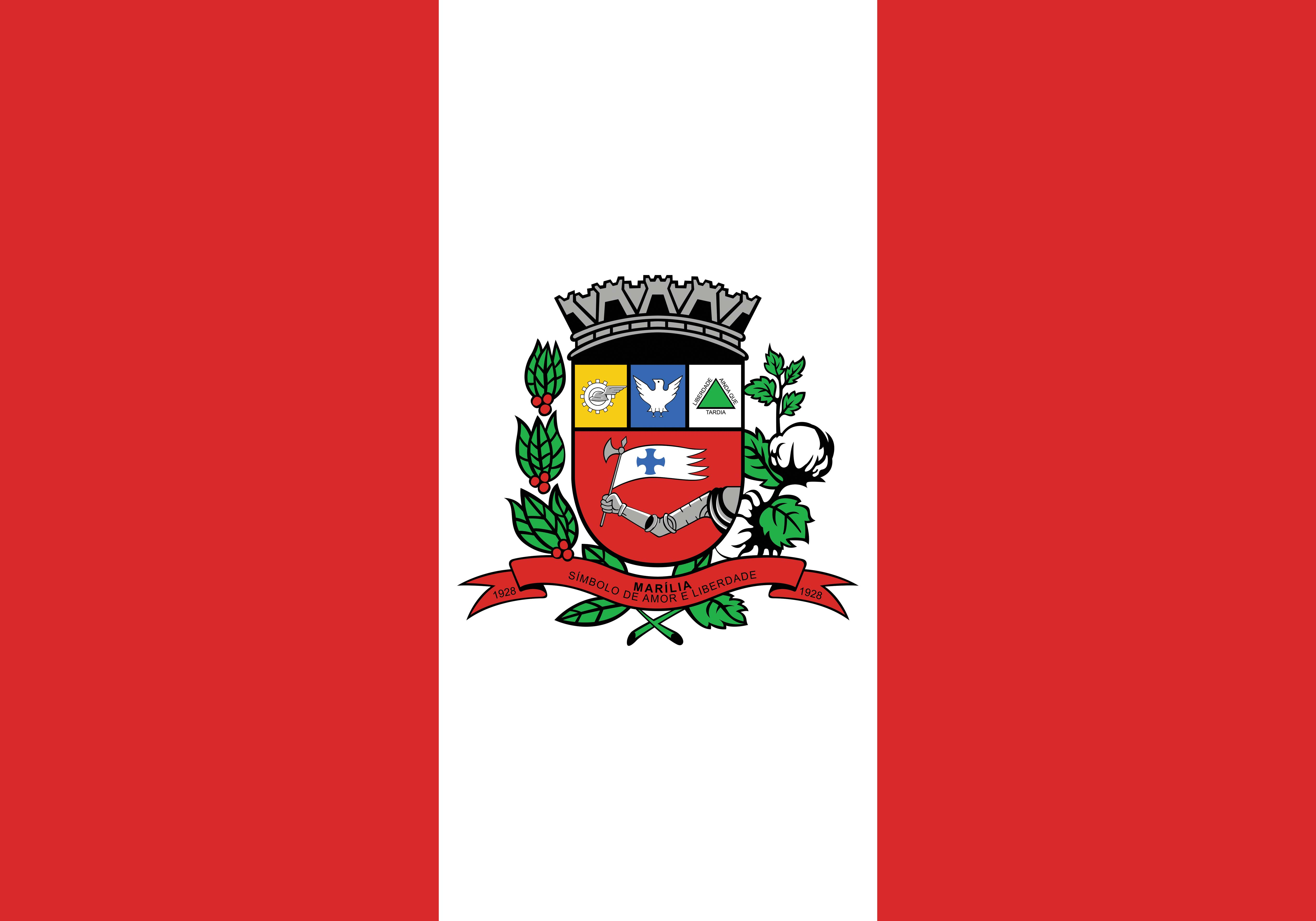
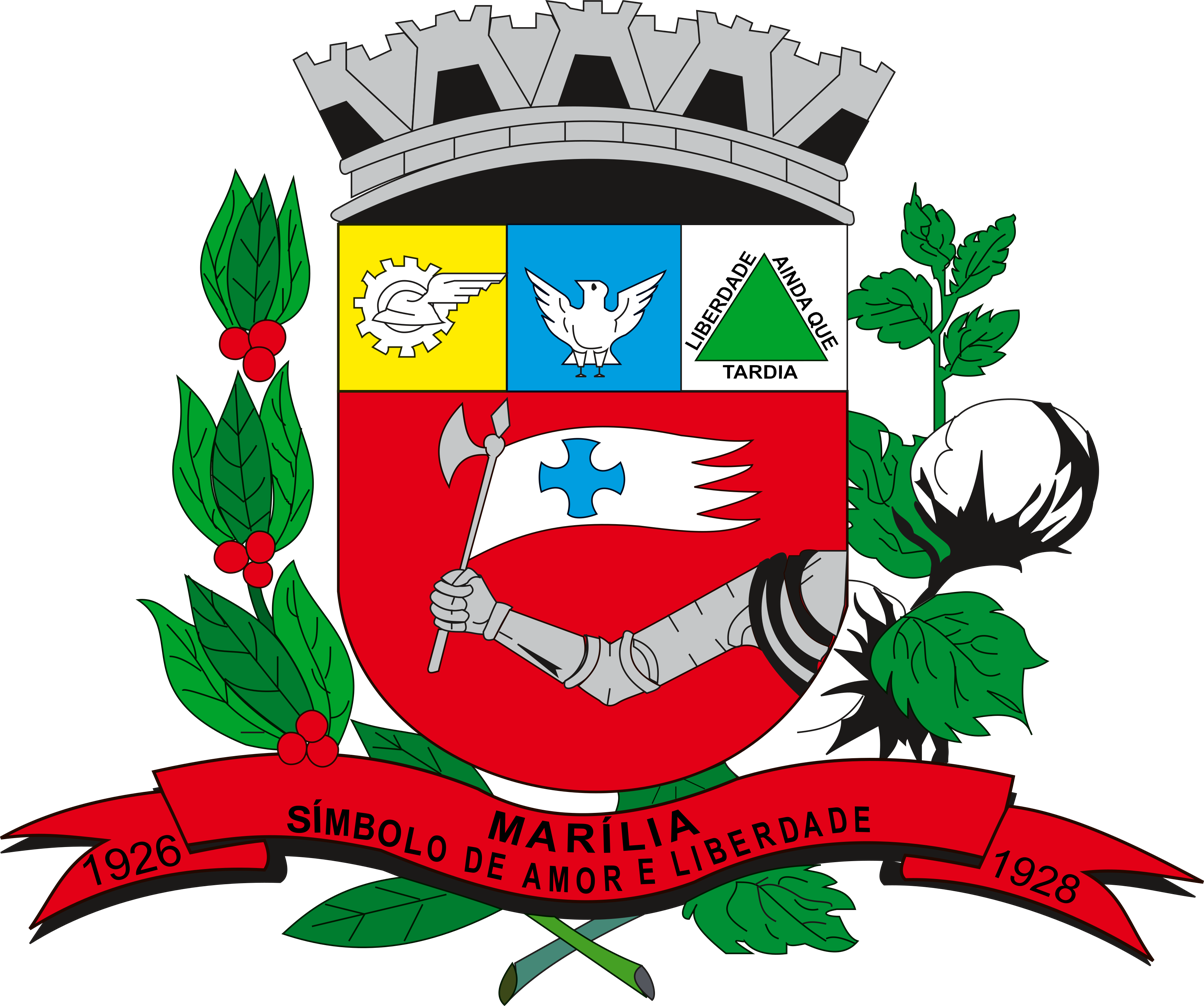
- Flag Coat of arms

- Location in São Paulo

- Location in Brazil
- Coordinates: 22°12′50″S 49°56′45″W
- Country: Brazil
- Region: Southeast
- State: São Paulo

Government
  - Mayor: Vinícius Camarinha (PSDB)

Area
  - Total: 1,170 km^{2} (450 sq mi)
- Elevation: 660 m (2,170 ft)

Population (2022 Brazilian census)
  - Total: 237,627
  - Estimate (2025): 247,348
  - Density: 203/km^{2} (526/sq mi)
- Time zone: UTC-03:00 (BRT)
  - Summer (DST): UTC-02:00 (BRST)
- HDI (2010): 0.798 – high
- Website: www.marilia.sp.gov.br

Marília (Portuguese pronunciation: [maˈɾiʎɐ]) is a Brazilian municipality in the midwestern region of the state of São Paulo. Its distance from the state capital São Paulo is 443 km (275 mi) by highway, 529 km (329 mi) by railway and 376 km (234 mi) in a straight line. It is located at an altitude of 675 meters. The population is 247,348 (2025 est.) in an area of 1170 km^{2}.

The municipality is emerging as an educational hub in São Paulo, with four public technical and higher education institutions (Unesp, Famema, Univesp and Fatec) and private institutions such as Unimar, Faef, Univem and Anhanguera. In 2017, 74 undergraduate courses were offered, with administration and pedagogy being the most offered. Marília has an average of one university student for every 18 inhabitants. The municipality also has the rural scientific research unit Agência Paulista de Tecnologia dos Agronegócios/APTA Regional de Marília).

== History ==
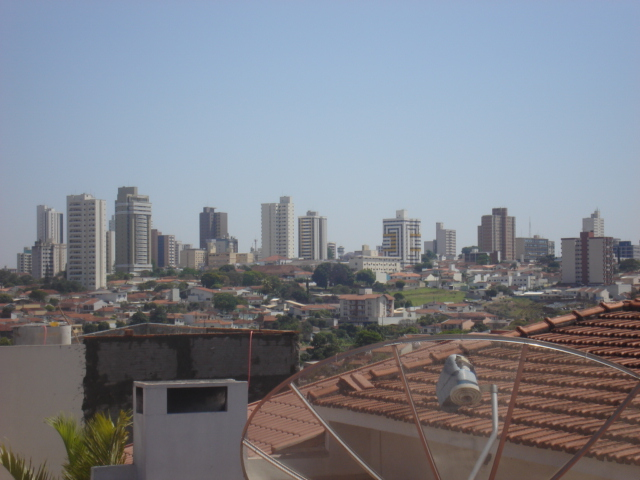
Panorama of the city from a rooftop.

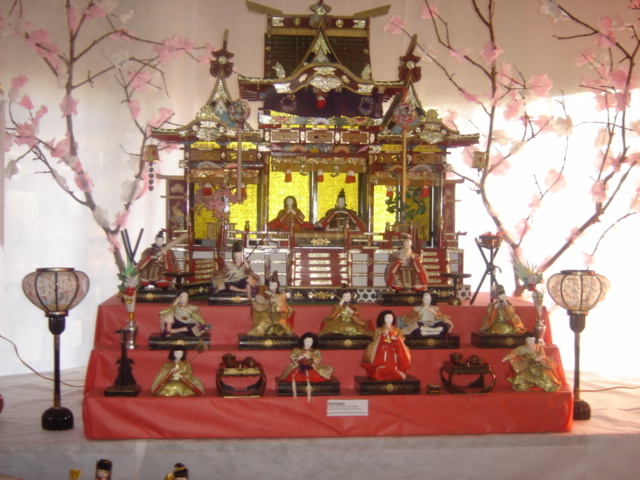
The city holds an annual festival of Japanese culture due to Brazil's large Japanese population.

In 1923, Antônio Pereira da Silva and his son José Pereira da Silva were the pioneers of the region, cleared land next to Feio and Peixe rivers. This land was named Alto Cafezal, or "High Coffee Plantation".

A city of Araraquara region deputy at the time, Bento de Abreu Sampaio Vidal held in 1926 a parcel of their assets.

In 1927, Colonel José Brás or Jose' da Silva Nogueira whose family origin in Itapetininga, arrived in Marilia. His family held 40% of the farm land named Bonfim, and the process of urbanization began with the allotment of this farm.

Companhia Paulista Railway had been advancing its tracks from São Paulo to get to the town of Lácio, and in accordance with its plan, the roads that were being opened at the branch were named in alphabetical order. The next branch should have its name beginning with the letter "M." "Maratona", "Mogúncio" and "Macau" were suggested, but Vidal was not satisfied with them. So, in one of his trips to Europe by ship, as he read Tomás Antônio Gonzaga's Marília de Dirceu, he chose the name Marília from the poetry book.

The city of Marília was created with this name by State Law No. 2161 on December 22, 1926, but remained as a borough of Cafelândia. In 1928, Marília was raised to the status of municipality by State Law No. 2320 of December 24. Its anniversary is celebrated on April 4, 1929.

At first, the economy of Marília was based on the cultivation of coffee, being replaced by cotton. The financial success originated from this latter crop led to the installation of the first two industries in the city (two cottonseed oil) in the mid-1930s. With the expansion of the industrialization in São Paulo state, rail and highways were also built, thereby linking Marilia to various regions of the state of São Paulo and northern Paraná.

In the 1940s the city established itself as a development of the West Paulista, when there was a large and growing urban population.

In the 1970s, there was a new industrial cycle in the city with the installation of new industries, specially food processing and welding. With the subsequent installation of several university courses, Marília attracted more people to the region, which accelerated the development of the city as a commercial & industrial hub.

Marília today has approximately 50 food industries in the area and it is known as the "National Capital of Food Processing."

== Demography ==
Data of Census of 2000: Total population: Metro: 189,719 Rural: 7623 Men: 96,502 Women: 100,840 Population density (inhabitants / km ²): 186.42 (2007) Infant mortality up to 1 year (per thousand): 15.57 Life expectancy (years): 74.37 Total Fertility rate: 2.21 Literacy rate: 95.35% Human Development Index (HDI): 0.821 HDI-R Income: 0.885 HDI-L Longevity: 0.822 HDI-E Education: 0.962

== Government ==
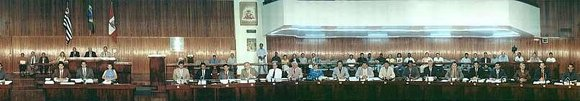
The Municipal government of Marília.

The current mayor is Vinícius Camarinha - PSDB elected on 2025, whose mandate is valid until 2028. The government receives little state funding due to high tax returns from the local tax income.

== Education ==
The city has several courses distributed in their colleges and universities. There are three universities: two private (Unimar and UNIVEM) and one public (UNESP) and three colleges, among them the school of medicine (Faculdade de Medicina de Marília).

== Transport ==
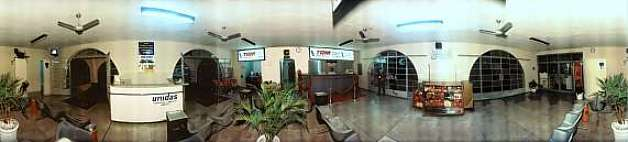
The front lobby of Marília's airport.

Marilia has one airport for regional and domestic flights named Frank Miloye Milenkowichi Airport. The city is crossed by 3 highways: the SP-294, the SP-333 and Rodovia Transbrasiliana (Transbrazilian Highway). As most cities in the region, Marilia no longer has passenger railway service. One of Brazil's largest airlines, TAM, got its start as Táxi Aéreo Marília here in 1961.

== Media ==
In telecommunications, the city was served by Companhia Telefônica Brasileira until 1973, when it began to be served by Telecomunicações de São Paulo. In July 1998, this company was acquired by Telefónica, which adopted the Vivo brand in 2012.

The company is currently an operator of cell phones, fixed lines, internet (fiber optics/4G) and television (satellite and cable).

== Religion ==
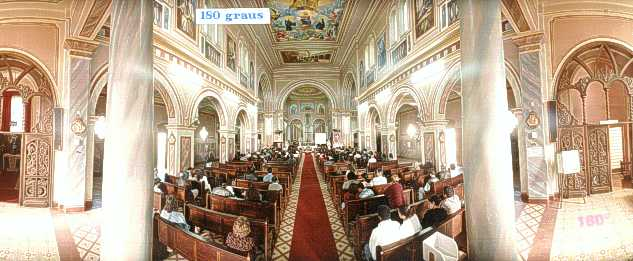
The Cathedral of Marília, which has a largely catholic population.

Christianity is present in the city as follows:

=== Catholic Church ===
The Catholic church in the municipality is part of the Roman Catholic Diocese of Marília.

=== Protestant Church ===
The most diverse evangelical beliefs are present in the city, mainly Pentecostal, including the Assemblies of God in Brazil (the largest evangelical church in the country), Christian Congregation in Brazil, among others. These denominations are growing more and more throughout Brazil.

== Interesting facts ==
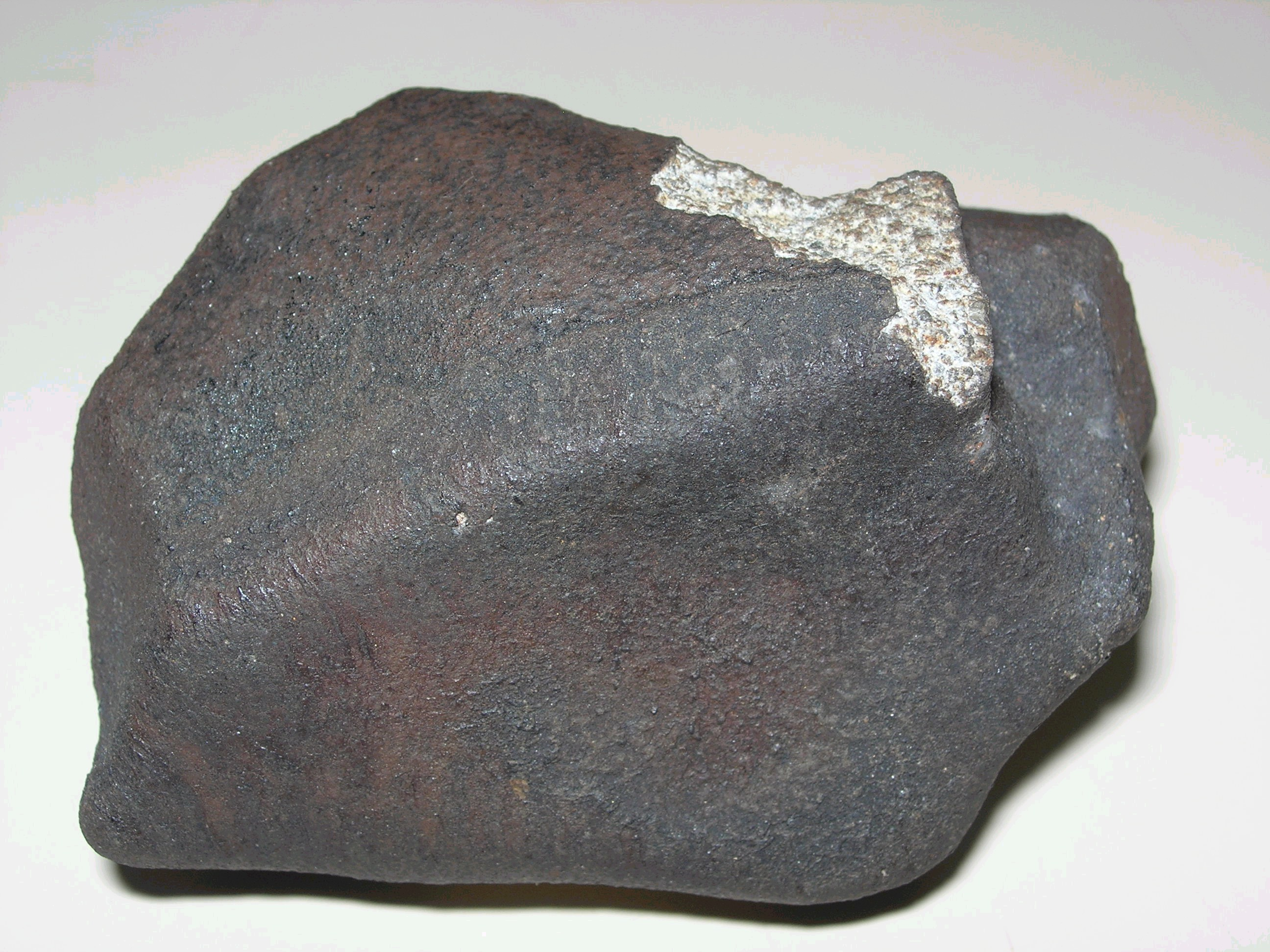
Marília Meteorite fragment.

- Ethnic Background: Marilia's population is mainly formed by descendants of Luso-African Brazilians, Portuguese, Japanese, Italians, Germans and Spaniards.
- The first Brazilian olympic medalist was from Marilia. Tetsuo Okamoto won a bronze medal in Helsinki in 1952, swimming 1500 m freestyle.
- The Southern Hemisphere's largest airline, TAM Brazilian Airlines, was founded in Marilia.
- Banco Bradesco was founded by Amador Aguiar on March 10, 1943, in Marilia, and it is the second largest private bank in Brazil today.
- A pre-historic crocodile, Mariliasuchus amarali, was found in Marilia and its name was a tribute to the city.
- On 5 October 1971, approximately at 5:00 pm, fell onto the city of Marília the last meteorite registered in the state of São Paulo: the Marília Meteorite. Seven fragments totaling about 2.5 kg were found, and the Marília Meteorite was subsequently classified as a chondrite H4.

== Twin towns and sister cities ==
Marília currently has three sister cities:

- Buffalo, New York, United States of America
- Higashihiroshima, Hiroshima, Japan
- Izumisano, Osaka, Japan

== Notable people ==
- Tetsuo Okamoto- swimmer, first brazilian to win an Olympic medal in swimming
- Thiago Braz - pole vaulter, Olympic champion
- Augusto Dutra - pole vaulter
- Lucas Lima - football player
- Guilherme de Cássio Alves - football player
- Isabella Menin - model and Miss Grand International 2022
- Jorge Antonio Putinatti - football player
- Jurandir de Freitas- football player
- Yoshiharu Kohayakawa- mathematician

== Climate ==
Climate data for Marília, elevation 641 m (2,103 ft), (1993–2010 normals, extremes 2007–2020)
Month	Jan	Feb	Mar	Apr	May	Jun	Jul	Aug	Sep	Oct	Nov	Dec	Year
Record high °C (°F)	37.6 (99.7)	37.8 (100.0)	35.8 (96.4)	35.1 (95.2)	32.8 (91.0)	32.0 (89.6)	32.2 (90.0)	36.8 (98.2)	38.4 (101.1)	42.3 (108.1)	38.4 (101.1)	37.2 (99.0)	42.3 (108.1)
Mean daily maximum °C (°F)	30.0 (86.0)	30.8 (87.4)	30.7 (87.3)	29.8 (85.6)	26.4 (79.5)	26.2 (79.2)	26.7 (80.1)	28.5 (83.3)	29.3 (84.7)	30.4 (86.7)	30.3 (86.5)	30.6 (87.1)	29.1 (84.5)
Daily mean °C (°F)	24.8 (76.6)	25.3 (77.5)	25.2 (77.4)	24.0 (75.2)	20.9 (69.6)	20.4 (68.7)	20.6 (69.1)	22.1 (71.8)	23.0 (73.4)	24.1 (75.4)	24.5 (76.1)	25.0 (77.0)	23.3 (74.0)
Mean daily minimum °C (°F)	19.7 (67.5)	19.8 (67.6)	19.6 (67.3)	18.2 (64.8)	15.3 (59.5)	14.6 (58.3)	14.5 (58.1)	15.7 (60.3)	16.7 (62.1)	17.9 (64.2)	18.6 (65.5)	19.3 (66.7)	17.5 (63.5)
Record low °C (°F)	15.1 (59.2)	16.2 (61.2)	14.2 (57.6)	7.4 (45.3)	7.4 (45.3)	0.0 (32.0)	2.7 (36.9)	3.6 (38.5)	7.2 (45.0)	10.2 (50.4)	11.4 (52.5)	9.2 (48.6)	0.0 (32.0)
Average precipitation mm (inches)	310.0 (12.20)	187.2 (7.37)	145.0 (5.71)	80.4 (3.17)	73.2 (2.88)	46.5 (1.83)	39.5 (1.56)	39.8 (1.57)	73.9 (2.91)	112.0 (4.41)	127.4 (5.02)	221.8 (8.73)	1,456.7 (57.36)
Average precipitation days (≥ 1.0 mm)	14.5	11.4	8.3	4.8	5.3	3.2	3.0	2.7	5.8	6.7	6.9	10.4	83
Source: Centro Integrado de Informações Agrometeorológicas
