= Vinícius Camarinha =

Brazilian politician (born 1979)

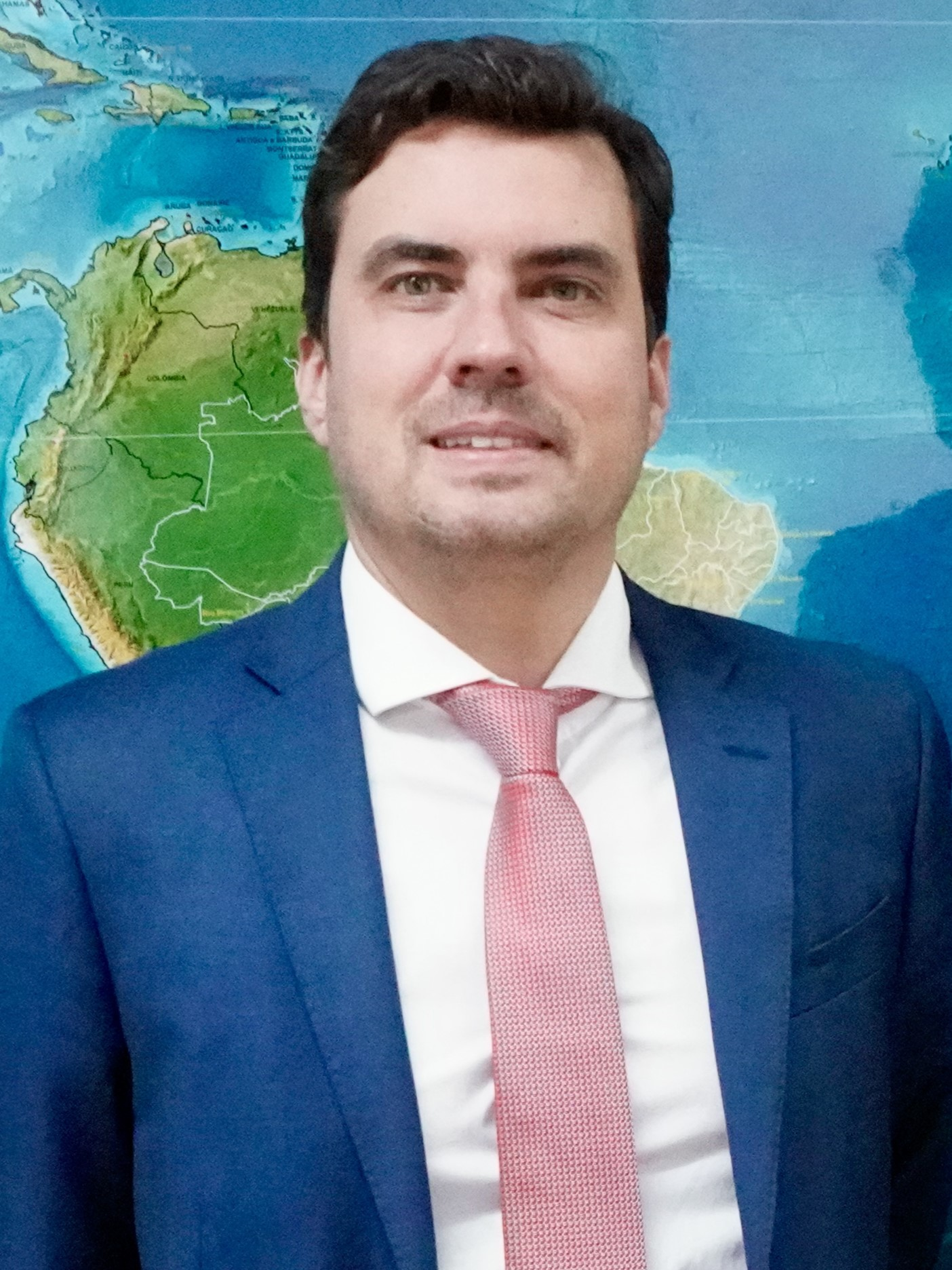
- Camarinha in 2024

Mayor of Marília
- Incumbent
- Assumed office 1 January 2025
- Preceded by: Daniel Alonso
- In office 1 January 2013 – 31 December 2016
- Preceded by: José Ticiano Dias Tóffoli
- Succeeded by: Daniel Alonso

Personal details
- Born: 6 November 1979 (age 46)
- Party: Brazilian Social Democracy Party (since 2022)
- Parent: Abelardo Camarinha (father)

Vinícius Almeida Camarinha (born 6 November 1979) is a Brazilian politician. He has served as mayor of Marília since 2025, having previously served from 2013 to 2016. He was a member of the Legislative Assembly of São Paulo from 2003 to 2012 and from 2019 to 2024.
