= Centro Universitário Eurípedes de Marília =

University in São Paulo, Brazil

The Centro Universitário Eurípides de Marília (UNIVEM) is a university in the city of Marília in Brazil. It is governed by the Fundação de Ensino Eurípides Soares da Rocha and was founded in 1967.
