= Roberto de Lucena =

Brazilian politician (born 1966)

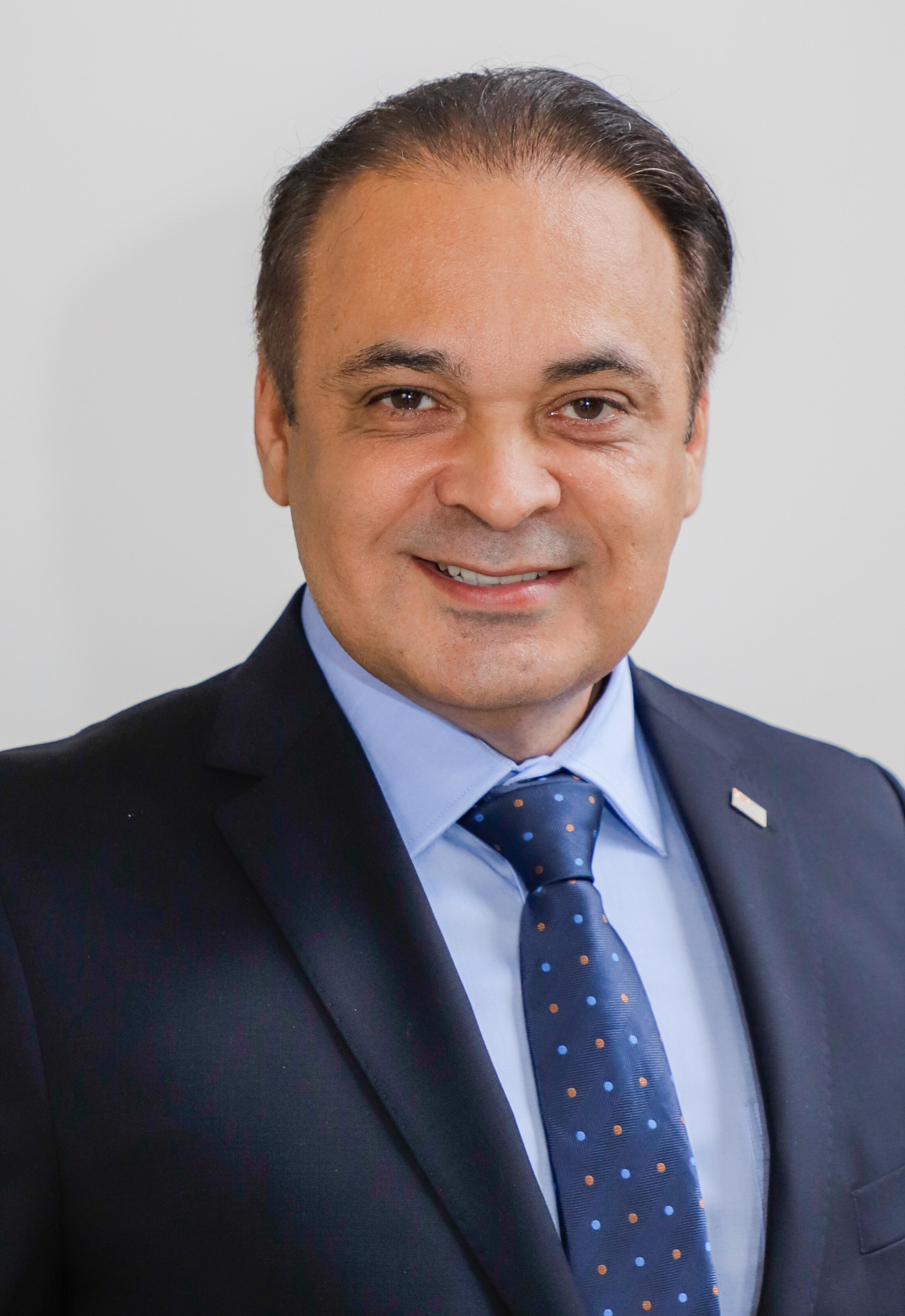
- Official photo of Roberto de Lucena as Secretary of Tourism and Travel of São Paulo, in 2023.

Secretary of Tourism and Travel for São Paulo
- Incumbent
- Assumed office 1 January 2023
- Deputy: From 1 February 2011, to 31 January 2023

Personal details
- Born: 18 April 1966 (age 60) Santa Isabel, São Paulo, Brazil
- Party: PV (2009–2018); PODE (2018–2022); Republicanos (2022–presente)

Roberto de Lucena (born 18 April 1966) is a Brazilian evangelical pastor, writer, and politician affiliated with the Republicanos party

== Personal life ==
He is the son of Antonio Vieira de Lucena and Eunice Alves de Lucena. In addition to being a politician, de Lucena is a writer and a pastor of the Igreja Evangélica Pentecostal O Brasil Para Cristo.

== Religious Involvement ==
Graduated in Religious studies from the Ecumenical Institute of Higher Education in 1999, Lucena is a pastor of the Evangelical Pentecostal Church "Brazil for Christ." He served as president of the church in Arujá from 1991 to 2010 and of the Supreme Council of the Brazil for Christ Church from 1999 to 2005. He also held positions in the National Council of Pastors of Brazil, the Bible Society of Brazil, and the National Christian Front for Social and Political Action. He is the author of the book Faith, Work, and Hope, published in 2018.

== Political career ==
On 17 April 2016, he voted in favor of the impeachment proceedings against Dilma Rousseff. During Michel Temer's administration, he supported the Constitutional Amendment Bill on the Public Spending Cap. In April 2017, he opposed the Labor Reform. In August 2017, he voted against the motion to open an investigation into then-president Michel Temer, contributing to the shelving of the charges brought by the Federal Public Prosecutor's Office.

Throughout his three terms, Roberto de Lucena served as president of the Brazil–United Nations Parliamentary Support Group (GPONU); vice president of the Tourism Committee in the Chamber of Deputies; member of the Parliamentary Front for Tourism in the National Congress; Secretary for Transparency of the Chamber of Deputies; and chaired the Standing Committee on Financial Oversight and Control. He was not re-elected in the 2022 elections and remains as an alternate.

He has twice served as São Paulo’s Secretary of Tourism, taking a leave from his federal deputy mandate: from 1 January 2015, to 5 April 2016; and again since 1 January 2023.
