= Instituto de Economia Agrícola =

Brazilian research institute

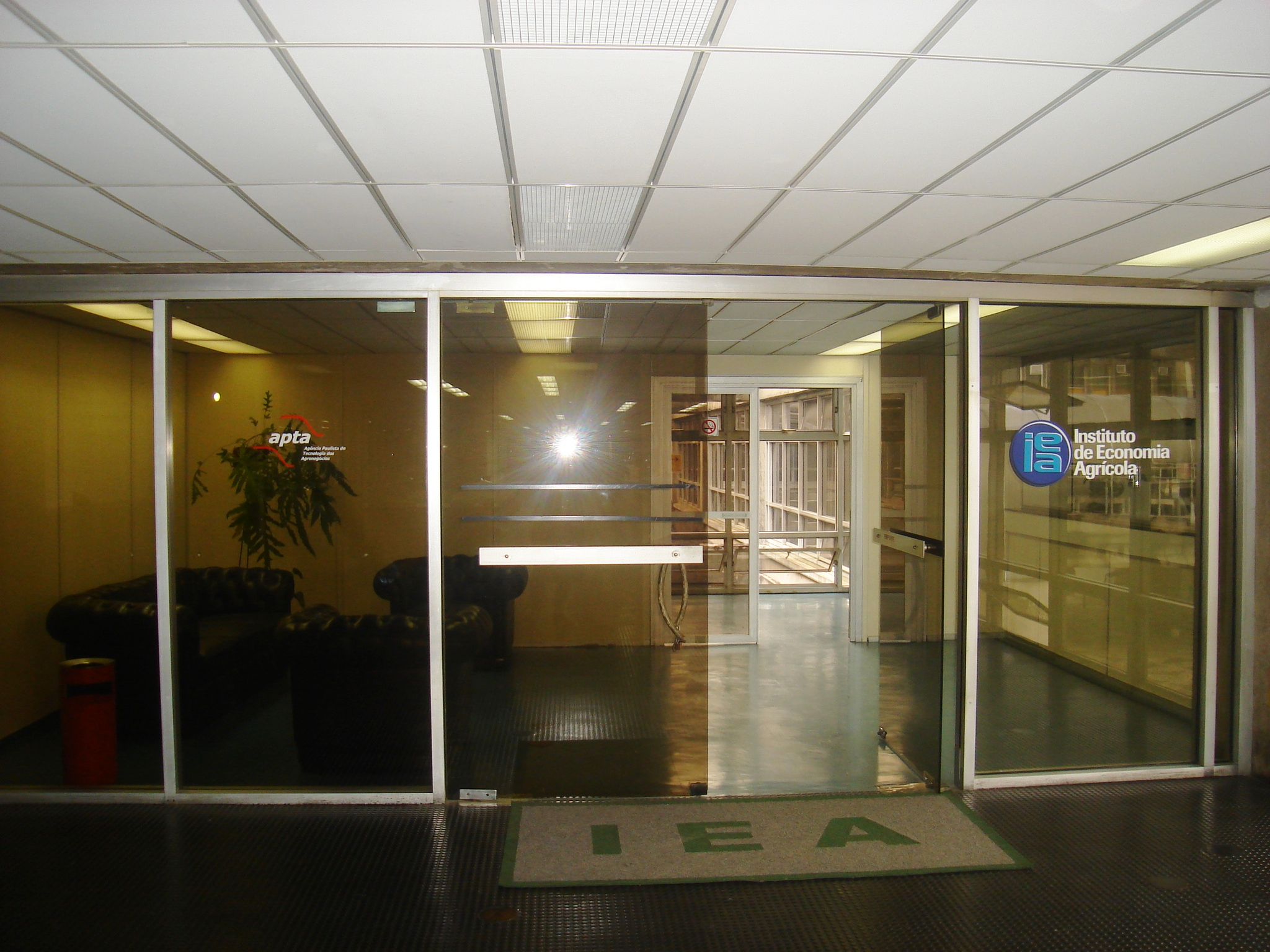
Instituto de Economia Agrícola.

The Instituto de Economia Agrícola (IEA - Agricultural Economics Institute), linked to the Agência Paulista de Tecnologia dos Agronegócios (APTA) is a major public scientific research institute on economics and statistics applied to agricultural and farming questions, established in São Paulo, Brazil. The aim to provide technical information to support agribusiness decision makers and governmental policies.

IEA was generated in the bosom of Dept. of Vegetable Production (DVP), created within Secretaria de Agricultura e Abastecimento in 1942. During a period to deepen his knowledge of fiber technology area, Agronomical Engineer Dr. Rui Miller Paiva became acquainted with the agricultural economy area and decided to follow that the discipline. Returning to São Paulo, Paiva brought with him ideas and the knowledge that led to the creation of the Rural Studies Commission, DPV's antecessor, the first Brazilian pole on economic issues related to agriculture. IEA's pioneering spirit continued for over 65 years. As early as the end of 1970, for example, researchers from that Institute would carry out assessments about the energetic balance of crops (today the concept is widely used in the discussions on bioenergy) and the effect of the expansion of sugar cane crop on soil use in the São Paulo (replacement of crops). In the latest years, its involvement with techno-science (nanotechnology) and its social and economical effects within agriculture are the highlight. IEA is a pioneer in probability sampling in order to forecast harvests, price surveys and the calculation of the market basket. Currently, it calculates and disseminates agricultural prices every four weeks, or the countryside inflation. The agriculture prices are a reference for the markets, wholesales, retailers and producers, both on a state and national level. IEA's statistical surveys (prices, production, estimates for harvests, labor market, land market) provided a model for other agriculture economics institutions. IEA introduced the MIT methodology (Massachusetts Institute of Technology), as well as the World Bank's, for the conception and economical assessment of agriculture development projects. The economical, prognostics, and the production costs analyses, the census of São Paulo agriculture and the cattle raising census, and the technical and scientific magazines have proved to be important information sources for decision-making on public and private policies. The Institute takes part in the formulation of public policies concerning the financing of Fundo de Expansão do Agronegócio Paulista (FEAP) in addition to contributing to the analyses of the support financing for small-scale agri-industry. Its surveys are used as a basis for choosing the municipalities to be benefited by the subsidy projects for the State's awarding of rural insurance. IEA discloses data on São Paulo's trade balance per group of commodities, and that ranking was developed by the institution itself. It's also discloses data on São Paulo and Brazil's agribusiness per added factor (basic and industrialized products) and by use category.

== Agricultural Economics Database ==
A wide variety of statistical data are available at the official website: Prices (land, inputs, producer, wholesale, retail); Crop estimation and forecasting (area, production, yield); Labor market; Land market and others. Data are obtained by census, sampling and other survey methods.

== Library ==
A specialized collection of over 40 thousands titles in the field of agricultural economics and related topics, open to the public from 8:00 am to 5:00 pm Monday through Friday.

== Publications ==
Revista de Economia Agrícola (Review of Agricultural Economics): a semiannual scientific journal aimed at providing articles, communications, book and thesis reviews, notes and commentaries. Accepts external contributions on Portuguese, English and Spanish. Printed and open electronic versions are available.

Informações Econômicas (Economic Information): a monthly technical and scientific journal publishing articles and analyses in the field of social and economic relations in agriculture. It also publishes statistical data. Accepts external contributions. Printed and open electronic versions are available.

Informações Estatísticas da Agricultura (Agriculture Statistical Information): yearbook with statistical data on vegetal and animal production, prices, labor market and other. Printed and open electronic versions are available.

Análises e Indicadores do Agronegócio (Agribusiness Analyses and Indicators): electronic review aimed at a fast dissemination of analyses and statistics about agriculture and cattle raising, with a focus on public policies, market and foreign trade. Only open electronic version are available.

All publications, statistics and other services are open and available for free download at the Institute website.

== Sources ==
MAGALHÃES, G.W. (coord.) Secretaria de Agricultura e Abastecimento do Estado de São Paulo. São Paulo: Governo do Estado de São Paulo, 2008.

INSTITUTO DE ECONOMIA AGRÍCOLA. Folder Institucional. São Paulo: IEA, 2008.

23°38′55.00″S 46°37′34.81″W
