= Faculdade de Medicina de Marília =

Public university in Marília, São Paulo

Coordinates: 22.2268°S 49.9365°W

Faculdade de Medicina de Marília (English: Faculty of Medicine of Marília), best known as Famema, is a public medical school located in Marília, São Paulo, Brazil.

Famema is one of the most prominent medical faculties in South America. The faculty enjoys close affiliation with a number of hospitals, research institutes and health care organisations in the State of São Paulo, Brazil.

== History ==
Famema was founded in 1966 as a private non-profit medical school. It was transformed into a public institution in 1994, and is now a self-governing body of the São Paulo state government. Since then, Famema has been one of the most innovative medical schools in Brazil, being the first Brazilian medical school to adopt Problem-Based Learning.

== Problem-based learning ==
Famema was the first medical school in Brazil to adopt Problem-Based Learning as the pedagogy for its medical and nursing courses. .After the implementation of the method, the medical curriculum was revised to become more student-centric, with decreasing classroom time and professor supervision, which has been the subject of criticism by some students and professors. Although controversial, the method resulted in Famema graduates achieving one of the highest marks on Brazil's National Student Performance Exam (ENADE in Portuguese).

== Hospital das Clínicas de Marília ==
Famema's teaching hospital is the Hospital das Clínicas de Marília.

== Rankings ==
In 2010, Famema ranked 21st on the Brazilian national medical school ranking. The Guia do Estudante magazine gave the Famema four stars out of five to both medical and nursing courses. In 2013, Famema appeared for the first time on RUF (Ranking Universitário Folha), the ranking of the biggest newspaper in Brazil, as the 10th best faculty of medicine.
