= Instituto Agronômico de Campinas =

Brazilian research institute

Coordinates: 22°53′31.18″S 47°03′51.96″W

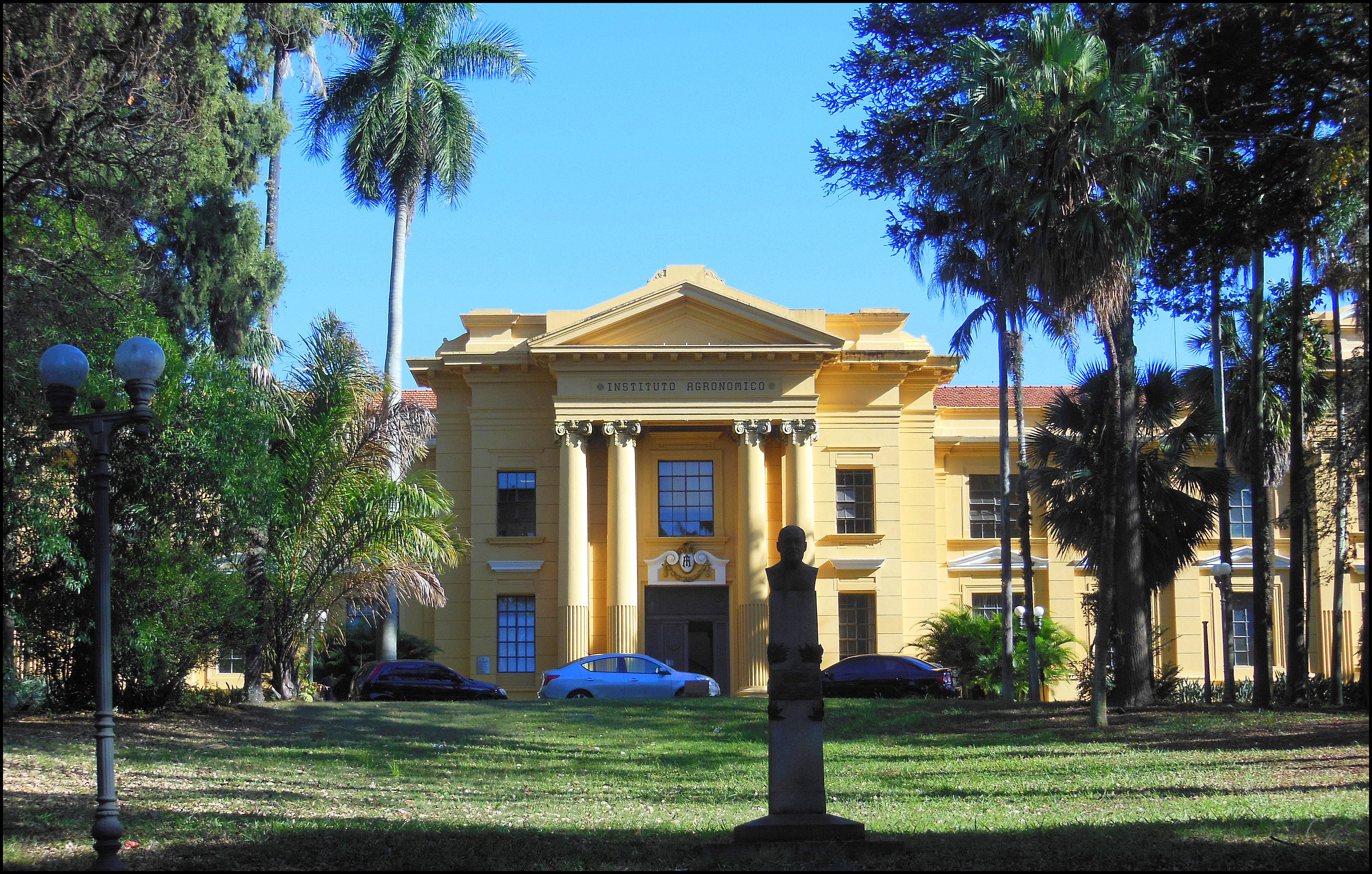
Instituto Agronômico de Campinas

The Instituto Agronômico de Campinas (Portuguese pronunciation: [ĩstʃiˈtutu aɡɾoˈnomiku dʒi kɐ̃ˈpinɐs]) (Agronomical Institute of Campinas—IAC) is a research and development institution affiliated to the Agência Paulista de Tecnologia dos Agronegócios (São Paulo Agency of Agrobusiness Technology), of the Secretary of Agriculture of the state of São Paulo, Brazil, with headquarters in the city of Campinas. It is the oldest institution of its kind in Latin America, having been founded by Emperor Dom Pedro II in 1887 as the Imperial Agronomical Station of Campinas. In 1892 it was transferred to the state government.

IAC's mission is to research, generate and transfer science and technology devoted to agriculture and related applied fields, with the aim of optimizing plant production, sustainable socio-economic development and environmental quality. As of January 2005, the Institute had 172 scientific researchers and 391 auxiliary and clerical workers. Besides the headquarters, a set of building in beautiful neoclassic style in Campinas' downtown, IAC operates a Central Experimental Center and four other Advanced Research Centers, with several experimental farms, comprising a total of 12.79 square kilometres of land.

The Institute also operates a botanical garden and a herbarium.

The Institute's activities center around the following areas:

== Research and development ==
- Agriculture research: with ca. 530 projects, particularly in horticulture, production of coffee, citrus fruits (oranges, lemons, etc.), sugarcane, grains and vegetable fibers in general, floriculture, as well as in soil and climate, phytosanity, agricultural mechanization, etc.
- Phytotechnology and plant improvement: research and development on genetic improvement of cultivars. IAC was singlehandedly responsible for startling and economically important progress in the cultivation of several plants in Brazil, by increasing productive yield, resistance to plagues, adaptation to different soils and climates, etc.
- Soil and weather: pure and applied research on the soil-plant-atmospheric relationships and ecology, with emphasis on types of soils and its improvement, fertilizers, plant nutrition, irrigation and soil conservation. The Institute is a pioneer in the use of satellite-based remote sensing and its applications to agriculture, the study of climate, etc. It has established the Brazilian System of Geographic Information (SGI), and databases on agrometereological information for agricultural planning.
- Agricultural engineering: studies on agricultural machinery, dynamometry, new materials, development of prototypes, use of new sources of energy, particularly renewable energy, solar energy, etc.
- Biological sciences: The Institute has pure and applied research laboratories on botany, cytology and cytogenetics. phytochemistry, molecular biology, phytopathology, entomology, virology, nematology, technology of seeds, fibers, etc.

== Services ==
The Institute has also a number of sectors for producing goods and offering services to agribusiness, such as:

- Seeds for improved cultivars
- Virus-free plant saplings
- Inoculants for nitrogen fixation and microrhyzic fungus
- Chemical analysis of soils and plants
- Technical analysis of fibers and seeds
- Analysis of plant products
- Introduction, quarantining and interchange of germoplasms
- Botanical identification and classification
- Mechanical tests of tractors and motors
- Agricultural planning

The Agronomical Institute of Campinas is also an acting member of the CIIAGRO (Integrated Center of Agrometeorological Information) and operates the INFOSECA (Information System on Droughts).

== Education and information dissemination ==
IAC has an intense activity in the dissemination of agricultural information. It publishes a technical bulletin, technical reports, and two periodicals, "Bragantia" - Revista de Ciências Agronômicas, and "O Agronômico" - Boletim Técnico Informativo. The Institute has a specialized library, with ca. 33,000 books and 2,860 periodical titles.

Regarding educational activities, the Institute offers research fellowships for students and professionals in agronomics, biology and correlated areas. It has several post-graduate training programs, some of them in collaboration with the State University of Campinas, EMBRAPA and other institutions.
