= Brazil for Christ Pentecostal Church =

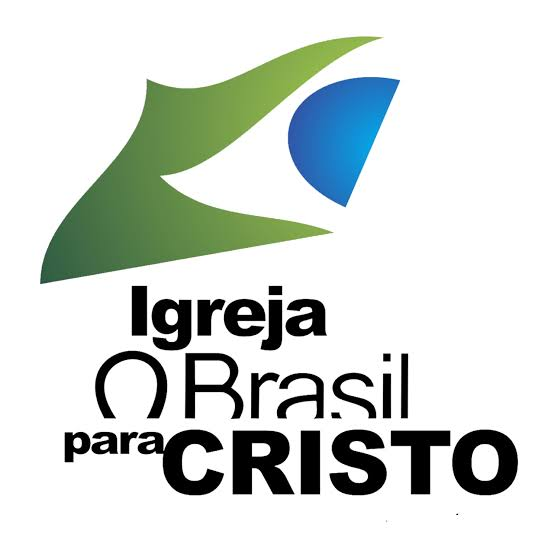
Official Logo

The Brazil for Christ Pentecostal Church (Portuguese: Igreja Pentecostal O Brasil para Cristo) is a Pentecostal denomination founded in Brazil in the 1950s.

== Early history ==
This denomination was founded by Manoel de Mello (1929–1990), a construction worker who called himself "Missionary". Mello came to São Paulo from the semi-arid and impoverished state of Pernambuco, and in São Paulo Mello converted in the Assemblies of God, but soon accepted the Healing movement at that time named National Evangelism Crusade, today Foursquare Gospel Church in Brazil.

== Influence of Manoel de Mello ==
In 1956 Manoel de Mello started his own church, the Igreja Pentecostal Brasil para Cristo (IBPC) ("Brazil for Christ" Church). Even though he was without a formal education, Mello was an eloquent preacher, using radio to spread his message, and his program, The Voice of Brazil for Christ, lasted on the air for two decades. He held meetings of healing and miracles in public squares and soccer stadiums. The IBPC grew mostly in poor, working-class neighborhoods in east São Paulo, populated mainly by immigrants from Northeast Brazil. The IPBC reached a nationwide presence in Brazil, though it is timidly present in foreign lands. Small regional Pentecostal movements were added to the IPBC, but also many people left this movement to start their own denominations, like the God is Love Pentecostal Church, and the House of Blessing Church. For a period of time, the IPBC was a member of the World Council of Churches. In 1986 Mello left the direction of his church and died four years later in 1990. The IBPC lost its impetus to the new charismatic movements, passed by internal problems, and lost many members to other churches, such as the Universal Church of the Kingdom of God.

== Contemporary history ==
The "Brazil for Christ" Church has today a significant presence in Brazil, with more than 1,000 churches, and some foreign work in Paraguay, Uruguay, Argentina, Portugal, and in the United States.
