= Virtual University of the State of São Paulo =

University in São Paulo, Brazil

- Universidade Virtual do Estado de São Paulo
- Type: Public university
- Established: July 20, 2012; 13 years ago
- Affiliations: University of São Paulo; State University of Campinas; São Paulo State University; São Paulo State Technological Colleges
- Students: ~60,000 (2023)
- Address: Av. Paulista, 352 - Bela Vista, [São Paulo] - SP, 01310-000, Brazil
- Colors: White; Black; Red
- Website: univesp.br

The Virtual University of the State of São Paulo (in Portuguese: Universidade Virtual do Estado de São Paulo, UNIVESP) is a public university in the state of São Paulo, Brazil, designed to offer semipresencial courses for the whole state. It is the first virtual public university in Brazil.

UNIVESP was founded under the Geraldo Alckmin government in 2012 and is linked to the São Paulo state government's Secretariat for Economic Development, Science, Technology and Innovation. Its courses are offered in partnership with the University of São Paulo, State University of Campinas, Paulista State University "Júlio de Mesquita Filho", Paula Souza Center and Padre Anchieta Foundation. UNIVESP courses are held in the Virtual Learning Environment (Ambiente Virtual de Aprendizagem, AVA), where there is interaction between the student and the tutor and students, as well as providing videotapes, digital libraries and pedagogical contents. There are also face-to-face meetings for activities and evaluations.

== Courses ==
Univesp offers the following undergraduate courses:

=== Technology (3 years) ===
- Technologist in Public Management

=== Bachelor's degrees (3 years) ===
- Degree in Information Technology

=== Bachelor's degrees (4 years) ===
- Degree in Chemistry
- Degree in Biology
- Degree in Pedagogy
- Degree in Mathematics
- Degree in Physics
- Degree in Data Science
- Degree in Business Administration

=== Engineering (5 years) ===
- Production Engineering
- Computer Engineering

== Education centers ==
Education centers are the academic and operational units for the development of face-to-face activities related to courses offered in distance mode. These places count on physical and technological infrastructure, as well as people, to support the students in the development of the pedagogical projects of the institution and of each one of the courses. Univesp has 243 poles in 203 municipalities in the state of São Paulo.

== See also ==
- Distance education
- University of São Paulo
