= Agência Paulista de Tecnologia dos Agronegócios =

Brazilian research institute

Coordinates: 23°38′55.88″S 46°37′37.74″W

The Agência Paulista de Tecnologia dos Agronegócios (APTA – São Paulo's Agency for Agribusiness Technology), linked to Secretaria de Agricultura e Abastecimento (Secretariat of Agriculture and Supplies), came about in 2001, in order to coordinate all agriculture and cattle raising research in the state of São Paulo, Brazil. Its main objective is to generate and transfer scientific and technological knowledge in agribusiness, thereby harmonizing the socio-economic development with environmental balance. The main innovation in this reorganization was the creation of 15 regional poles of development, spread throughout the state. APTA has guided itself by the prospects of technological demands, and does it regionally, as an instrument to guide the research of the entire agency. In addition to the poles, APTA's structure encompasses the six research bodies of the Secretaria da Agricultura and Abastecimento (SAA – Secretariat of Agriculture and Supplies) – the Instituto Agronômico de Campinas (IAC -Agronomical Institute), the Biological Institute, the Instituto de Economia Agrícola (IEA - Agricultural Economics Institute), the Instituto de Zootecnica (IZ - Zoo technical Institute), the Instituto de Pesca (Fisheries Institute) and the Instituto de Tecnologia de Alimentos (ITAL – Food Technology Institute). The agency centers its activities on four strategic programs: bioenergy, environmental sustainability, organization of the rural and outlying areas, and food safety. As the second largest agribusiness technological research institution in Brazil and the Southern Hemisphere, APTA features 64 experimental units and 43 research laboratories.
