= São Paulo State Technological College =

University in Brazil

Faculdade de Tecnologia do Estado de São Paulo
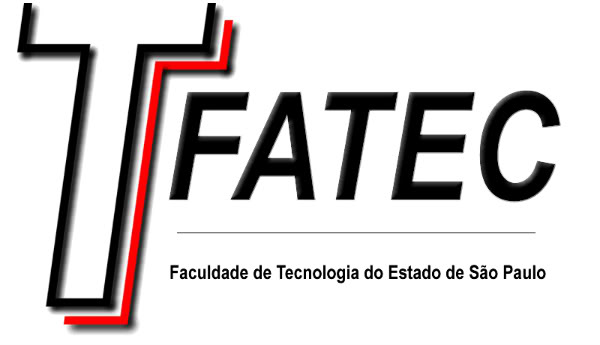
- Motto: Competência em Educação Pública Profissional
- Motto in English: Competence in Public Vocational Education
- Type: Public university system
- Established: May 20, 1970; 56 years ago
- Founder: Abreu Sodré
- Parent institution: Centro Estadual de Educação Tecnológica Paula Souza
- Accreditation: MEC
- Affiliations: USP•UNESP•FAPESP•UNIVESP•UNICAMP
- Budget: R$2.511.612.599 (US$ 502.322.519,80.)
- Chancellor: Clóvis Dias
- Vice-Chancellor: Maycon Geres
- Dean: Prof. Josué Souza de Gois(São Paulo Campus).
- Undergraduates: 90.000(2024)
- Location: São Paulo State
- Campus: Multi-campus institution
- Colors: Black; Red
- Website: https://www.cps.sp.gov.br/fatec/cursos-oferecidos-pelas-fatecs/

The São Paulo State Technological Colleges (FATECs, Portuguese: Faculdades de Tecnologia do Estado de São Paulo) are public institutions of higher education maintained by the State Center of Technological Education (CEETEPS). FATECs are important Brazilian institutions of higher education, being pioneers in the graduation of technologists. They are located in several cities of the São Paulo state, with four campuses in the capital (Bom Retiro, Campos Elíseos, Ipiranga, East Zone and South Zone), and several other units in the metropolitan region of São Paulo, countryside and seashore.

The 46 FATECs offer high degree careers in virtually all areas of knowledge. In most of the units, are offered courses of higher education in technology, focused in the training of technologists. The units of São Caetano do Sul, Ourinhos, Carapicuíba and Americana, however, offer the option of bachelorship and licentiate degree in the career of System Analysis and Information Technology, starting the tradition of FATECs to train, too, bachelors and licentiates.

More than 28 thousand students are currently enrolled in FATECs. For the formation of this quota is annually invested more than R$1 billion (US$420,000 mi).

== History ==
The first milestone of the trajectory of FATECs was the founding, in 1969, of the Center of Technological Education of São Paulo State, by the current Governor of the State Abreu Sodré, which had as objective the training of technologists to supply the growing demand for university-level professionals. The CEETEPS was installed in Coronel Fernando Prestes plaza, in the center of São Paulo, using the old campus of USP Polytechnic School.

The courses run by FATEC Bom Retiro (or FATEC-SP) are the oldest, having been taught since 1969. That year, was founded in the city of Sorocaba the Sorocaba Technological College, with the same goals. In 1970, were created the higher education technological courses of Construction, in the forms: Buildings, Hydraulic Works, Earthmoving and Paving. Were subsequently created the higher education technological courses of Mechanics, in the forms: Workshops and Designer.

In 1973, by state law, the Center came to be called Centro Estadual de Educação Tecnológica Paula Souza (State Center of Technological Education) and their classes began to form the São Paulo State Technological College. This way, CEETEPS became the maintainer of two FATECs: one in São Paulo and one in Sorocaba. In 1974, has been created the higher education technological career of Data Processing, today still reference in the area of Information Technology.

In 1976, the state government merge, by law, all its isolated higher education establishments into the UNESP (São Paulo State University). As CEETEPS was not an educational institution, but the maintainer of two academic units, the law that created the UNESP established that CEETEPS will integrate the new university in the condition of special institution, linked and associated with it.

== Admission ==
As in other Brazilian government academic institutions, the teaching in FATEC is funded by taxation and not paid for directly by the students. The admission is done through public concourse (vestibular), open to anyone who has completed or is about to finish high school. CEETEPS himself is responsible for the public concourse, which is conducted every six months. The vestibular of FATEC, unlike the majority of Brazilian public institutions of higher education, consists in only one phase, covering various questions of multiple choice and one essay.

According to 2008 vestibular, 38,220 applicants competed for 6,175 places in dispute that year. The major concurrence recorded was of career of Systems Analysis and Development (Night) in FATEC São Paulo (Bom Retiro), with 22.8 applicants per vacancy. In 2009, the average demand in the three campuses of the capital was 7.54 candidates per seat. The data confirm the tradition of FATEC to promote one of the most competitive selective processes of Brazil.

== Structure and Teachers ==
The São Paulo State Technoloulties are divided into 46 units, with presence in 44 cities of São Paulo State. In opposition with other Brazilian institutions of state and federal education, FATECs do not have rectory, with each unit being coordinated by a director, subordinated to CEETEPS superintendent and bound to UNESP rectory.

Is mandatory requirement for admission as a teacher in FATEC be carrying the title of master or doctor in recommended program recognized by Brazilian law. The wages of teachers of FATEC are among the best in Brazil public school system, with income of R$4,932.00 (US$2,103.20) for assistant professor, R$5,523.84 (US$2,355.58) for Associate Professor and R$6,954.12 (US$2,965.51) for Complete Professor. The maximum salary of teachers is of R$7,743.24 (US$3,302.02).

== Graduation ==
The FATECs are currently offering 84 undergraduate courses, in all three areas of knowledge.

The average length of courses in FATEC is 2,800 hours, with three years duration. Taking into account that the final resolution of the Brazilian Ministry of Education (MEC) provides the minimum hours to 2,400 hours for various careers of bachelorship, we can conclude that even with a shorter duration in comparison to traditional degree courses, the degrees offered in FATECs form professionals with working hours equal and even superior to several BA. This is possible because the number of hours that students remain in schools every day is high, being more than 5 hours on some campuses. It is noteworthy that for the FATECs, Saturday is considered normal day for study.

As there is occurring a strong expansion in existing units and in the creation of new faculties of technology, some careers are having their cases being analyzed by the State Council of Education. In these cases, the start of classes is conditional to final approval from the council.

== Points of Excellence ==
The FATECs are recognized by their quality on professional training in the areas of Information Technology, Logistics and Transport and Precision Mechanics (Mechatronics). The rate of employability of former students of FATEC is high, compared with Brazilian standards, with more than 93% in labor market, with average starting pay of R$2,500.00 (US$1,066.10).

The Student's Guide, an annual publication of Editora Abril (popular Brazilian publisher), which evaluates the courses of BA on the market, in its 2008 edition, quoted the career of Bachelorship in System Analysis and Information Technology (FATEC Ourinhos), classifying it with 3 stars (good). The evaluation, taken as very satisfactory for a recent class, is proof of the level of quality associated with São Paulo State Technological Faculties.

== See also ==
- List of state universities in Brazil
- São Paulo Federal Institute of Education, Science and Technology
