= 2017 Campeonato Goiano =

Campeonato Goiano
- Season: 2017
- Champions: Goiás
- Relegated: Goianésia; CRAC
- Matches: 76
- Goals: 174 (2.29 per match)
- Top goalscorer: Gilmar (Itumbiara); 8 goals

The 2017 Campeonato Goiano (officially the Campeonato Goiano de Profissionais da 1ª Divisão – Edição 2017) is the 74th edition of Goiás's top professional football league. The competition began on 28 January 2017 and ended on the 7th of May 2017.

== Participating teams ==
Club	Home city	Stadium
Anápolis	Anápolis	Estádio Jonas Duarte
Aparecidense	Aparecida de Goiânia	Estádio Annibal Batista de Toledo
Atlético Goianiense	Goiânia	Antônio Accioly
CRAC	Catalão	Estádio Genervino da Fonseca
Goiás	Goiânia	Estádio da Serrinha
Goianésia	Goianésia	Estádio Valdeir José de Oliveira
Iporá	Iporá	Estádio Ferreirão
Itumbiara	Itumbiara	Estádio JK
Rio Verde	Rio Verde	Estádio Velosão
Vila Nova	Goiânia	O.B.A

== Format ==
In the first stage, the 10 teams were drawn into two groups of five teams each.

Group A	Points/Status
Goiás; Vila Nova; Iporá; Itumbiara; CRAC	23 Points (Classified); 22 Points (Classified); 18 Points; 17 Points; 09 Points (Relegated)

Group B	Points/Status
Aparecidense; Atlético Goianiense; Anápolis; Rio Verde; Goianésia	25 Points (Classified); 22 Points (Classified); 17 Points; 15 Points; 13 Points (Relegated)

== Final stage ==
Semifinals
1	Vila Nova	2	2	4
4	Aparecidense	1	2	3
2	Atlético Goianiense	1	0	1
3	Goiás	2	0	2

Finals
1	Vila Nova	0	0	0
2	Goiás	3	1	4

== Championship selection ==
- 01. Marcelo Rangel (Goiás);
- 02. Magno Silva (Vila Nova);
- 03. Wesley Matos (Vila Nova);
- 04. Mirita (Aparecidense);
- 06. Patrick (Goiás);
- 05. Léo Sena (Goiás);
- 08. Clécio (Aparecidense);
- 10. Tiago Luís (Goiás);
- 11. Gilmar (Itumbiara);
- 07. Moisés (Vila Nova);
- 09. Léo Gamalho (Goiás).
- Técnico: Zé Teodoro (Aparecidense)
- Artilheiro: Gilmar (Itumbiara)
- Revelação: Michael (Goianésia)
- Craque: Tiago Luís (Goiás)
- Melhor árbitro: Eduardo Tomaz
- Assistentes: Bruno Pires e Fabrício Vilarinho
