= 2018 Campeonato Goiano =

Goiás's top professional football league

Campeonato Goiano
- Season: 2018
- Champions: Goiás
- Relegated: Anápolis; Rio Verde
- Matches: 76
- Goals: 170 (2.24 per match)
- Top goalscorer: Nonato (Aparecidense); 9 goals

The 2018 Campeonato Goiano (officially the Campeonato Goiano de Profissionais da 1ª Divisão – Edição 2018) is the 76th edition of Goiás's top professional football league. The competition began on 17 January 2018 and ended on 8 April 2018.

== Participating teams ==
Club	Home city	Stadium
Anapolina	Anápolis	Estádio Jonas Duarte
Anápolis	Anápolis	Estádio Jonas Duarte
Aparecidense	Aparecida de Goiânia	Estádio Annibal Batista de Toledo
Atlético Goianiense	Goiânia	Antônio Accioly
Goiás	Goiânia	Estádio da Serrinha
Grêmio Anápolis	Anápolis	Estádio Jonas Duarte
Iporá	Iporá	Estádio Ferreirão
Itumbiara	Itumbiara	Estádio JK
Rio Verde	Rio Verde	Estádio Velosão
Vila Nova	Goiânia	O.B.A

== Format ==
In the first stage, the 10 teams were drawn into two groups of five teams each.

[4]

Group A	Points/Status
Goiás; Anapolina; Iporá; Atlético Goianiense; Rio Verde	27 Points (Classified); 22 Points (Classified); 22 Points; 18 Points; 07 Points (Relegated)

Group B	Points/Status
Vila Nova; Aparecidense; Grêmio Anápolis; Itumbiara; Anápolis	24 Points (Classified); 23 Points (Classified); 19 Points; 13 Points; 13 Points (Relegated)

== Final stage ==
Semifinals
1	Aparecidense (pen)	0	2	2 (4)
4	Vila Nova	0	2	2 (2)
2	Anapolina	2	1	3 (2)
3	Goiás(pen)	1	2	3 (4)

Finals
1	Aparecidense	0	1	1
2	Goiás	0	3	3

== Championship selection ==
- Goalkeeper: Marcelo Rangel (Goiás)
- Right side: Maguinho (Vila Nova)
- Defender: Mirita (Aparecidense)
- Defender: Eduardo Brock (Goiás)
- Left-Back: Marquinhos (Anapolina)
- Defensive Midfield: Léo Sena (Goiás)
- Centre-Forward: Elias (Iporá)
- Centre-Forward: Esquerdinha (Anapolina)
- Attacker: Alex Henrique (Aparecidense)
- Attacker: Maranhão (Goiás)
- Attacker: Nonato (Aparecidense)
- Manager: Hélio dos Anjos (Goiás)
- Championship star: Marcelo Rangel (Goiás)
- Revelation: Madison (Goiás)
