= 2019 Campeonato Goiano =

Campeonato Goiano
- Season: 2019
- Champions: Atlético Goianiense
- Relegated: Itumbiara; Novo Horizonte
- Matches played: 86
- Goals scored: 210 (2.44 per match)
- Top goalscorer: Alan Mineiro (Vila Nova) - (9 goals)
- All statistics correct as of 20 February 2021.

The 2019 Campeonato Goiano (officially the Campeonato Goiano de Profissionais da 1ª Divisão – Edição 2019) is the 77th edition of Goiás's top professional football league. The competition began on 19 January 2019 and ended on 21 April 2019.

== Participating teams ==
Club	Home city
Anapolina	Anápolis
Aparecidense	Aparecida de Goiânia
Atlético Goianiense	Goiânia
CRAC	Catalão
Goianésia	Goianésia
Goiânia	Goiânia
Goiás	Goiânia
Grêmio Anápolis	Anápolis
Iporá	Iporá
Itumbiara	Itumbiara
Novo Horizonte	Ipameri
Vila Nova	Goiânia

== Format ==
In the first stage, the 12 teams were drawn into two groups of six teams each.

Group A	Group B
Goiás31 Points (Class); Goianésia20 Points (Class); CRAC20 Points (Class); Anapolina15 Points (Class); Aparecidense14 Points; Itumbiara09 Points (Relegated)	Atlético Goianiense28 Points (Class); Vila Nova19 Points (Class); Goiânia16 Points (Class); Grêmio Anápolis12 Points (Class); Iporá10 Points; Novo Horizonte06 Points (Relegated)

== Final stage ==
=== Quarter-finals ===
Team 1	Score	Team 2
Vila Nova	(2)–(1)	CRAC
Anapolina	(1)–(7)	Atlético Goianiense
Goiânia	(4)–(3)	Goianésia
Aparecidense	(3)–(4)	Goiás

=== Semi-finals ===
Team 1	Score	Team 2
Vila Nova	(1)–(2)	Atlético Goianiense
Goiânia	(1)–)(6)	Goiás

=== Final ===
Team 1	Score	Team 2
Atlético Goianiense	(4)–(0)	Goiás
