= Morrinhos, Goiás =

Morrinhos
- Municipality
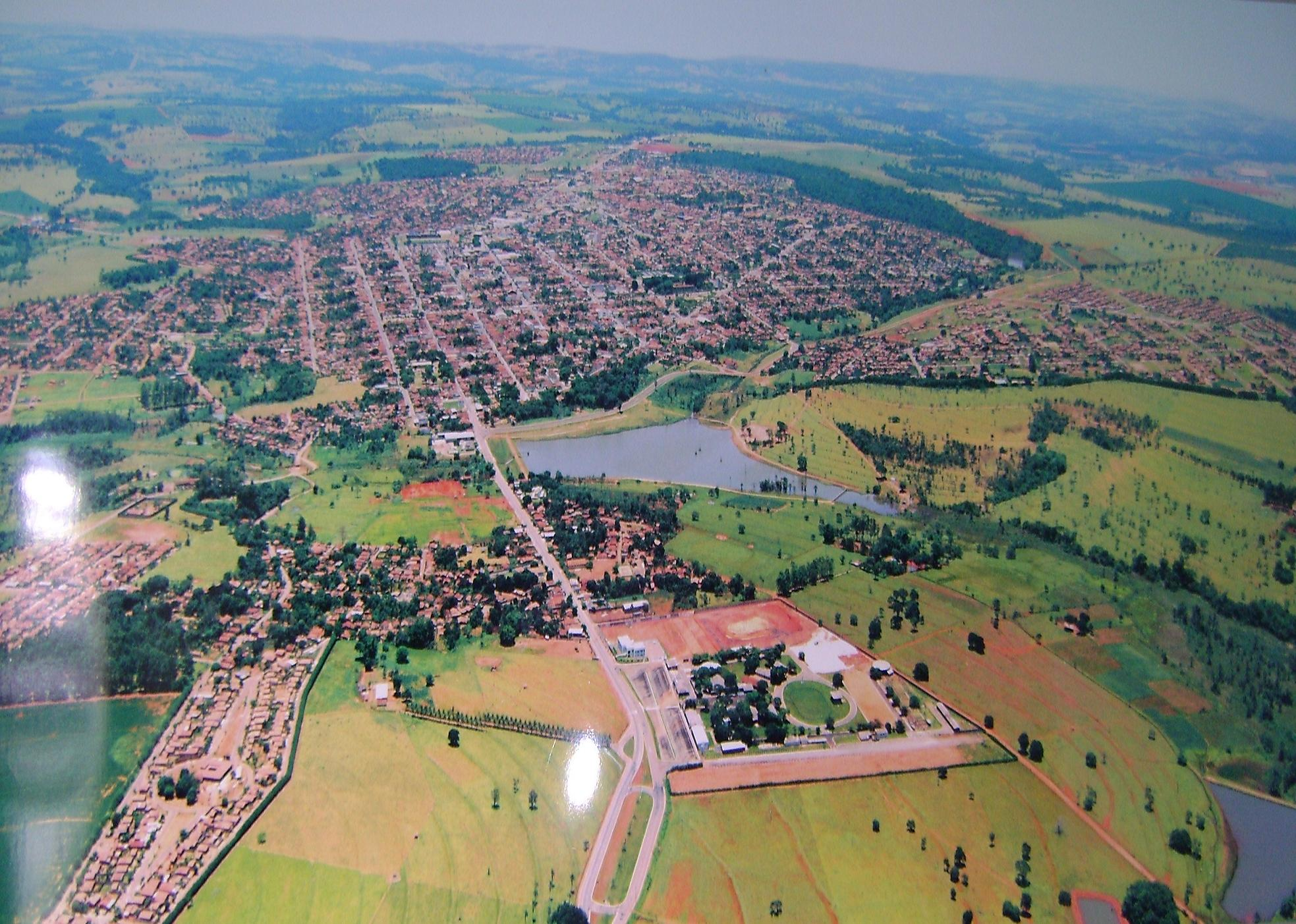
- Morrinhos from above

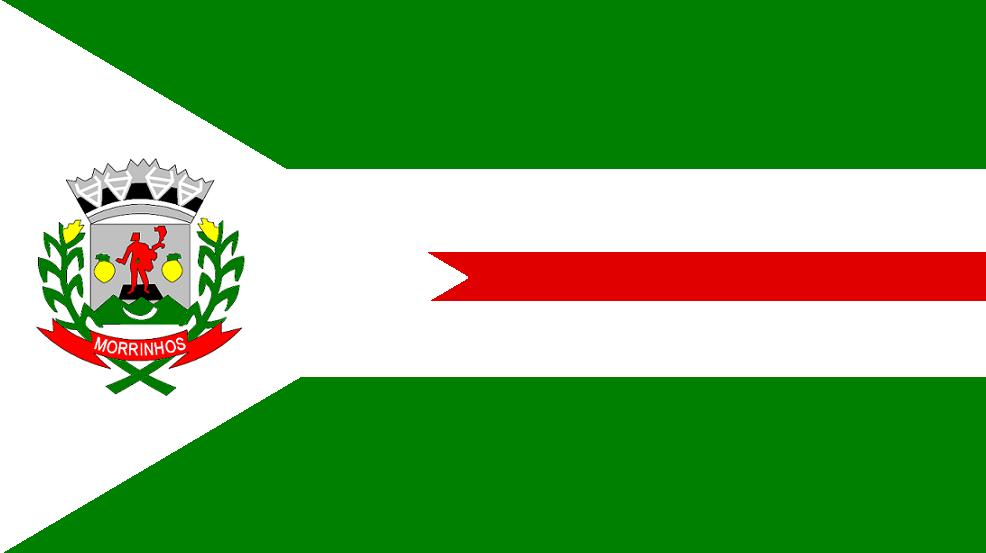
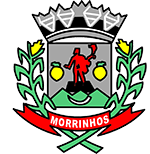
- Flag Coat of arms

- Location in Goiás state

- Location in Brazil
- Coordinates: 17°43′47″S 49°04′42″W
- Country: Brazil
- Region: Central-West
- State: Goiás
- Microregion: Meia Ponte Microregion

Area
  - Total: 2,846.2 km^{2} (1,098.9 sq mi)
- Elevation: 771 m (2,530 ft)

Population (2020)
  - Total: 46,548
  - Density: 16.354/km^{2} (42.358/sq mi)
- Time zone: UTC−3 (BRT)
- Postal code: 75650-000
- Website: www.morrinhos.go.gov.br

Morrinhos is a municipality in southern Goiás state, Brazil. It is a large producer of agricultural products, especially poultry and dairy products.

== Location ==
Morrinhos is located almost directly south of the state capital, Goiânia and is 8 km (5.0 mi) west of the major BR-153 highway, which links Goiânia to São Paulo. It is the gateway to Caldas Novas, a hot water resort, which is 52 km (32 mi) to the east. The distance to Goiânia is 128 km (80 mi).

Neighboring municipalities are:

- North: Piracanjuba
- South: Buriti Alegre and Goiatuba
- East: Caldas Novas, Rio Quente, and Água Limpa
- West: Joviânia, Aloândia, and Pontalina

== Political information ==
Mayor: Rogério Carlos Troncoso Chaves (January 2013) City council: 9

== Districts ==
- Village (Povoado): Rancho Alegre
- Hamlets (Aglomerados): Jardim da Luz, Marcelândia and Vertente Rica.

== Demographic information ==
In 2007 the population density was 13.70 inhabitants/km^{2} (35.49 inhabitants/sq mi). The population has grown at a moderate pace since 1980, when it was 32,122. The geometric growth rate between 2000 and 2007 was 0.76%. In 2003 most of the population was living in the urban area, which had 33,251 inhabitants, while 5,746 people were living in the rural area.

== Climate and geography ==
The climate is mainly tropical humid, with temperatures varying between 18 and 24 °C (64 and 75 °F). The topography is flat and the relief is wavy. The flora is composed mainly of small woods with aroeira, cedar, jacaranda, ipê, and some medicinal plants like douradinha, quinine, chapéu-de-couro, and congonha.

== Economy ==
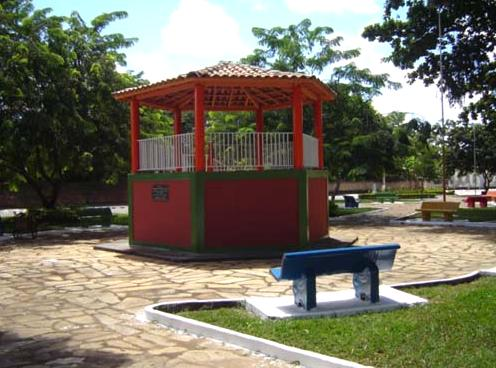
Praça do Coreto in Morrinhos

The economy is based on agriculture, services, and small industries. Agriculture is the main economic activity and the main crops are soybeans, corn, rice, beans, tomatoes, cotton, pineapples, and citrus fruits. The cattle herd is large, with 258,170 head in 2006. With 66,690 dairy cattle, milk production is very important and Morrinhos was the third largest producer of milk in Goiás with over 67 million liters annual production in 2006.

There was a substantial poultry industry with 347,000 head in 2006.

In June 2007 there was 1 industrial zone in the city, 74 industrial units, and 494 retail units. There were 2 dairies: Marajoara Indústria de Laticínios Ltda.; - Cooperativa Mista dos Produtos de Leite de Morrinhos Ltda (3 units). The financial sector was represented by 5 branches: Banco do Brasil S.A. - BRADESCO S.A. - Banco Itaú S.A. - Banco ABN AMRO Real S.A - CEF.

Main agricultural products in total planted area were oranges, cotton, rice, beans, watermelon, corn (3,000 hectares or 7,400 acres), soybeans (28,000 hectares or 69,000 acres), sorghum, tomatoes, and wheat. (Data are from 2006 IBGE/Sepin.)

Farm data (2006)

- Number of farms: 1,638
- Total area: 211,640 ha (523,000 acres)
- Area of permanent crops: 1,011 ha (2,500 acres)
- Area of perennial crops: 22,533 ha (55,680 acres)
- Area of natural pasture: 140,861 ha (348,080 acres)
- Persons dependent on farming: 4,600
- Farms with tractors: 355 (per IBGE)
- Cotton: 1,146 ha (2,830 acres)
- Corn: 3,000 ha (7,400 acres)
- Beans: 4,900 ha (12,000 acres)
- Rice: 1,000 ha (2,500 acres)
- Soybeans: 28,000 ha (69,000 acres)
- Oranges: 190 ha (470 acres)
- Papaya: 10 ha (25 acres)
- Guava: 15 ha (37 acres)
- Passion fruit: 25 ha (62 acres)
- Watermelon: 220 ha (540 acres)
- Heart of palm: 230 ha (570 acres)
- Sorghum: 2,000 ha (4,900 acres)
- Tomatoes: 1,530 ha (3,800 acres) (With 114 central pivots, Morrinhos is the largest producer of tomatoes in the state.)

== Health and education ==
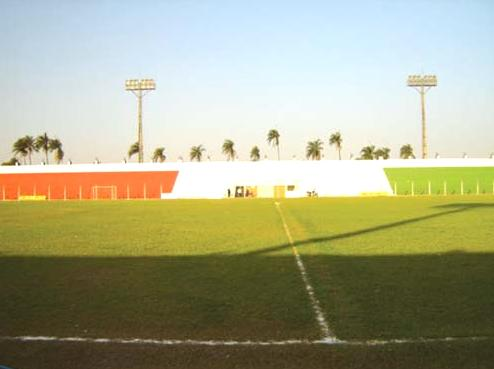
Centro Esportivo João Vilela in Morrinhos

In 2007 there were 3 hospitals with 121 beds. One hospital was public and 2 were private. The infant mortality rate was 13.88 in 2000, well below the state and national average. In 2006 the school system had 40 schools and 10,458 students. Higher education was represented by a campus of the state university: UEG - Faculdade de Educação, Ciências e Letras de Morrinhos - FECLEM. The adult literacy rate was 88.9% in 2000.

== Origin of the name ==
The name of the town comes from the hills (morros) of Ovo, Catraca, and Cruz, well-known points in the region.

== High quality of life ==
Morrinhos is one of the best places to live in the state. In the United Nations Human Development Index, it had a rating of 0.806, which ranked it in 6th place out of a total of 242 municipalities in the state of Goiás. Nationally it was ranked 806 out of 5,503 municipalities. For the complete list see Frigoletto.com.br.

== Tourism ==
The Jatobá Centenário ecological park was established in 1996. It has about 0.5 km^{2} (0.19 sq mi) of virgin forest and around 2,100 metres (6,900 feet) of trails. Various species of fauna can be found. The most common are the macacos-pregos (nail monkeys), tatus (armadillos), tamanduás, capivaras, wolves, foxes, deer, fish, jabutis, ducks, egrets, hawks, toucans, jaós, partridge, bem-te-vi, and joão-de-barro, among others.

The Jatobá centenário (centenary) is the largest tree in the park, which impresses visitors with its majestic beauty. There are several natural lakes in the forest with cold and clear waters.

== History ==
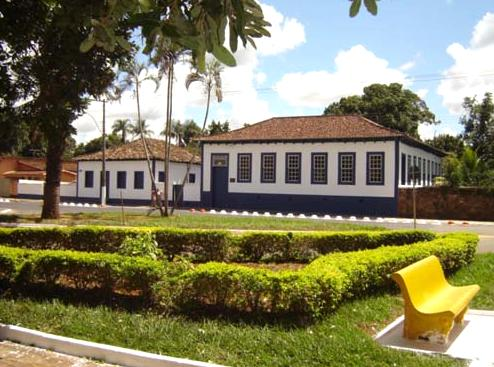
Casa de Hermenegildo L. de Morais in Morrinhos

In the beginning of the nineteenth century, Antônio Correia Bueno and his brothers Inácio and Pedro, from Patrocínio, Minas Gerais, arrived in the region. Only Antônio decided to stay with his family. In 1845, Captain Gaspar Martins Veiga donated the land to create the town. Its first name was Nossa Senhora do Carmo but when it was elevated to a district the name was changed to Vila Bela de Morrinhos (or in some documents Vila Bela do Paranaíba). In 1855, it became a municipality, including the district of Vila Bela do Paranaíba (seat) and Santa Rita do Paranaíba.

- 1855: The loss of Caldas Novas and suppression of the municipality of Vila Bela do Paranaíba, whose territory now became part of Santa Cruz.
- 1869: The municipality of Nossa Senhora da Abadia de Pouso Alto (Piracanjuba) is created, with territory dismembered from the municipalities of Santa Cruz and Bonfim and the Districts of Pouso Alto (seat), Vila Bela do Paranaíba, Caldas Novas and Santa Rita do Paranaíba.
- 1871: Re-establishment of the municipality with the name of Vila Bela de Morrinhos or, according to other documents, Vila Bela de Nossa Senhora do Carmo de Morrinhos, with territory dismembered from the municipality of Pouso Alto (Piracanjuba).
- 1882: Concession of status as a city, which began to be designated Morrinhos.
- 1892: The municipality of Morrinhos is made up of the districts of Morrinhos, Santa Rita do Paranaíba, Caldas Novas and Bandeiras (later, Goiatuba).
- 1909: The municipality of Santa Rita do Paranaíba is created, taking the district of Bananeiras.
- 1911: The municipality of Caldas Novas is created, with territory dismembered from Morrinhos, including the village of Marzagão.
- 1919: The district of Bananeiras (present-day Goiatuba) is returned to the municipality of Morrinhos.
- 1920: The municipality of Morrinhos includes the districts of Morrinhos, Bananeiras and Santa Rita do Pontal (present day {Pontalina). According to the census of 1920, Morrinhos is the municipality in Goiás with the greatest number of rural properties (1,172).
- 1931: The village of Bananeiras is elevated to the condition of Vila and the municipality of Bananeiras is created. Today it is called Goiatuba.
- 1935: The district of Santa Rita do Pontal separates to become the municipality of Pontalina. Source History of Morrinhos.

== See also ==
- List of municipalities in Goiás
