= Buriti Alegre =

- Municipality
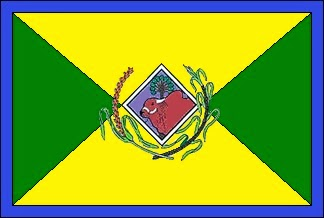
- Flag

- Location in Goiás state

- Location in Brazil
- Coordinates: 18°08′17″S 49°02′30″W
- Country: Brazil
- Region: Central-West
- State: Goiás
- Microregion: Meia Ponte Microregion

Area
  - Total: 897.4 km^{2} (346.5 sq mi)
- Elevation: 786 m (2,579 ft)

Population (2020)
  - Total: 9,484
  - Density: 10.57/km^{2} (27.37/sq mi)
- Time zone: UTC−3 (BRT)
- Postal code: 75660-000

Buriti Alegre is a municipality in south Goiás state, Brazil. The population was 9,484 inhabitants (2020) in a total area of 897.4 km^{2}. Buriti Alegre is a large producer of poultry products.

== Location and communications ==
Buriti is located in the extreme south of the state between Morrinhos and Itumbiara. It is part of the Meia Ponte Microregion. The distance to the state capital, Goiânia, is 181 km. The distance to the important BR-153 highway is 26 km. The elevation is 620 meters above sea level.

Highway connections from Goiânia are made by BR-153, passing through Aparecida de Goiânia and Professor Jamil and taking GO-419. Source: Sepin

Buriti has boundaries with the following municipalities: Morrinhos (north); Itumbiara and Tupaciguara, (south); Água Limpa (east); and Goiatuba (west).

The municipality is crossed by several rivers, the most important being the Paranaíba and the Corumbá. There is also the Pirancanjuba, which flows into the Corumbá. The Lago das Brisas with an area of 778 km^{2} is formed by the meeting of the waters of the Piracanjuba, Corumbá and Paranaíba.

== History ==
Buriti Alegre began in 1910 with the construction of a chapel on the Buriti ranch. The chapel was dedicated to Our Lady of Aparecida and attracted pilgrims from around the region. In 1914 it became a district of Catalão. In 1927 it was dismembered to become a municipality.

== Demographic and political data ==
- Population density in 2007: 9.23 inhabitants/km^{2}
- Population growth rate 1996-2007: -0.79.%
- Total population in 2007: 8,287
- Total population in 1980: 8,803
- Urban population in 2007: 7,525
- Rural population in 2007: 762 (2,190 in 1980)
- City government in 2005: mayor (João Alfredo de Mello Neto), vice-mayor (José Martins Marques), and 09 councilpersons

(Seplan)

== Economy ==
The economy is based on cattle raising and agriculture, which is diversified, producing corn, rice, soybeans, oranges, and bananas. In the 1950s Buriti had one of the largest herds of zebu cattle in the country, but today the number is around 80 thousand head. There are slaughterhouses for cattle and poultry in the town.

- Number of industrial establishments: 15
- Number of retail commercial establishments: 121
- Meat packing houses: Buriti American Beef Ltda.; - JMA Ind. de Alimentos Ltda. (22/05/2006)
- Financial institutions: Banco do Brasil S.A. (2007)
- Automobiles: 1,286

Agricultural Production

- Cattle raising: 79,000 head in 2006
- Poultry raising: 988,000 head in 2006
- Rice: 800 ha.
- Bananas: 440 ha.
- Oranges: 297 ha.
- Corn: 1,380 ha.
- Soybeans: 2,500 ha.
- Tomatoes: 46 ha.

(Seplan and IBGE)

Farm data 2006

- Farms: 366
- Total area: 130,347 ha.
- Area of permanent crops: 947 ha.
- Area of perennial crops: 13,545 ha.
- Area of natural pasture: 85,349 ha.
- Persons dependent on farming: 1,080
- Farms with tractors: 101
- Number of tractors: 198 IBGE

== Health (2007) ==
- Health units: 03
- Hospitals: 01, with 34 beds in 2003
- Infant mortality rate in 2000: 21.47
- Infant mortality rate in 1990: 29.47

(Seplan and IBGE)

== Education (2006) ==
- Schools: 09 with 2,487 students
- Higher education: none in 2005
- Literacy rate in 2000: 84.4

(Seplan and IBGE)

Ranking on the Municipal Human Development Index

- MHDI: 0.758
- State ranking: 62 (out of 242 municipalities)
- National ranking: 1,654 (out of 5,507 municipalities)

(*Frigoletto)

== See also ==
- List of municipalities in Goiás
