= Água Limpa =

- Municipality
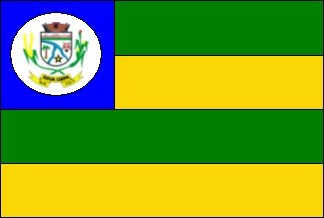
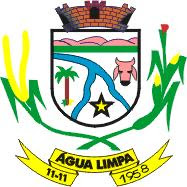
- Flag Coat of arms

- Location in Goiás state

- Location in Brazil
- Coordinates: 18°04′29″S 48°45′40″W
- Country: Brazil
- Region: Central-West
- State: Goiás
- Microregion: Meia Ponte Microregion

Area
  - Total: 452.8 km^{2} (174.8 sq mi)
- Elevation: 682 m (2,238 ft)

Population (2020)
  - Total: 1,830
  - Density: 4.04/km^{2} (10.5/sq mi)
- Time zone: UTC−3 (BRT)
- Postal code: 73780-000

Água Limpa is a municipality in south Goiás state, Brazil. The population was 1,830 in 2020 and the municipal area was 454.3 km^{2}.

== Geography ==
Água Limpa is located in the Meia Ponte Microregion (See Citybrazil for all the regions) in the extreme south of the state approximately 20 kilometers north of the Itumbiara artificial lake, which forms the boundary between the states of Goiás and Minas Gerais. The town is connected by paved roads with Caldas Novas to the north and Itumbiara to the west.

The distance to the state capital, Goiânia, is 195 km. Highway connections from Goiânia are made by BR-153 / Aparecida de Goiânia / Morrinhos / GO-147. See Distancias Rodoviarias Sepin

=== Municipal boundaries ===
- north: Morrinhos and Rio Quente
- south: Minas Gerais
- east: Marzagão
- west: Buriti Alegre

=== Demographics ===
- Population density: 4.58 inhabitants/km^{2} (2007)
- Population in 2007: 2,074
- Population in 1980: 2,226
- Urban population in 2007: 1,447
- Rural population in 2007: 627
- Population growth rate 1996/2006: 0.03%

== History ==
The foundation of Água Limpa occurred in 1929 when João Porfiro Ribeiro fixed a cross and began to cultivate the fertile lands. It was not until 1931 when the first house covered by tiles was built. The name Água Limpa comes from a stream which crosses the municipality. In 1945 it was raised to district level belonging to Caldas Novas. In 1958 it became a municipality.

== Economy ==
The economy is based on services, government employment, cattle raising, and agriculture. The cattle herd had 48,770 head in 2006. The main economic enterprise was commerce with 27 units.

=== Agricultural data 2006 ===
- Farms: 245
- Total area: 10,915 ha.
- Area of permanent crops: 7 ha.
- Area of perennial crops: 88 ha.
- Area of natural pasture: 8,581 ha.
- Area of woodland and forests: 2,213 ha.
- Persons dependent on farming: 530
- Farms with tractors: 37
- Number of tractors: 43 IBGE

== Health ==
- Infant mortality in 2000: 29.47
- Infant mortality in 1990: 30.11
- Health establishments: 01 (2007)
- Hospital beds: 0

== Education ==
- Literacy rate in 2000: 86.7
- Literacy rate in 1991: 79.7
- Schools: 02 with 561 students

Source: IBGE

The United Nations Human Development Index (2000) ranked Água Limpa 108 out of 242 municipalities in the state of Goiás and 2166 out of 5507 municipalities in all the country with a score of 0.739. For the complete list see Frigoletto.

== See also ==
- List of municipalities in Goiás
