= Campeonato Goiano =

Football league of Goiás, Brazil

- Organising body: FGF
- Founded: 1944; 82 years ago (as an amateur Campeonato de Goiânia); 1962; 64 years ago (as the professional Campeonato Goiano)
- Country: Brazil
- State: Goiás
- Level on pyramid: 1
- Relegation to: Segunda Divisão
- Domestic cup: Copa do Brasil
- Current champions: Goiás (29th title) (2026)
- Most championships: Goiás (29 titles)
- Website: FGF Official website
- Current: 2026 Campeonato Goiano

The Campeonato Goiano is the top-flight professional state football league in the Brazilian state of Goiás. It is run by the Goiás Football Federation (FGF).

== List of champions ==
=== Amateur era ===
Season	Champions	Runners-up
1944	Atlético Goianiense (1)	Goiânia
1945	Goiânia (1)	Goiás
1946	Goiânia (2)	Atlético Goianiense
1947	Atlético Goianiense (2)	Goiânia
1948	Goiânia (3)	Atlético Goianiense
1949	Atlético Goianiense (3)	Goiânia
1950	Goiânia (4)	Vila Nova
1951	Goiânia (5)	Goiás
1952	Goiânia (6)	Atlético Goianiense
1953	Goiânia (7)	Goiás
1954	Goiânia (8)	Atlético Goianiense
1955	Atlético Goianiense (4)	Goiânia
1956	Goiânia (9)	Goiás
1957	Atlético Goianiense (5)	Goiânia
1958	Goiânia (10)	Atlético Goianiense
1959	Goiânia (11)	Atlético Goianiense
1960	Goiânia (12)	Goiás
1961	Vila Nova (1)	Atlético Goianiense

=== Professional era ===
Season	Champions	Runners-up
1962	Vila Nova (2)	Santa Rita
1963	Vila Nova (3)	Ferroviário
1964	Atlético Goianiense (6)	Goiás
1965	Anápolis (1)	Vila Nova
1966	Goiás (1)	Inhumas
1967	CRAC (1)	Atlético Goianiense
1968	Goiânia (13)	Anápolis
1969	Vila Nova (4)	CRAC
1970	Atlético Goianiense (7)	Goiânia
1971	Goiás (2)	Vila Nova
1972	Goiás (3)	Atlético Goianiense
1973	Vila Nova (5)	Goiás
1974	Goiânia (14)	Goiás
1975	Goiás (4)	Goiânia
1976	Goiás (5)	Goiânia
1977	Vila Nova (6)	Goiás
1978	Vila Nova (7)	Goiás
1979	Vila Nova (8)	Atlético Goianiense
1980	Vila Nova (9)	Goiás
1981	Goiás (6)	Anapolina
1982	Vila Nova (10)	Goiás
1983	Goiás (7)	Anapolina
1984	Vila Nova (11)	Goiânia
1985	Atlético Goianiense (8)	Goiás
1986	Goiás (8)	Atlético Goianiense
1987	Goiás (9)	Atlético Goianiense
1988	Atlético Goianiense (9)	Goiás
1989	Goiás (10)	Vila Nova
1990	Goiás (11)	Mineiros
1991	Goiás (12)	Atlético Goianiense
1992	Goiatuba (1)	Goiás
1993	Vila Nova (12)	Goiás
1994	Goiás (13)	Vila Nova
1995	Vila Nova (13)	Anápolis
1996	Goiás (14)	Atlético Goianiense
1997	Goiás (15)	CRAC
1998	Goiás (16)	Vila Nova
1999	Goiás (17)	Vila Nova
2000	Goiás (18)	Vila Nova
2001	Vila Nova (14)	Goiás
2002	Goiás (19)	Novo Horizonte
2003	Goiás (20)	Novo Horizonte
2004	CRAC (2)	Vila Nova
2005	Vila Nova (15)	Goiás
2006	Goiás (21)	Atlético Goianiense
2007	Atlético Goianiense (10)	Goiás
2008	Itumbiara (1)	Goiás
2009	Goiás (22)	Atlético Goianiense
2010	Atlético Goianiense (11)	Santa Helena
2011	Atlético Goianiense (12)	Goiás
2012	Goiás (23)	Atlético Goianiense
2013	Goiás (24)	Atlético Goianiense
2014	Atlético Goianiense (13)	Goiás
2015	Goiás (25)	Aparecidense
2016	Goiás (26)	Anápolis
2017	Goiás (27)	Vila Nova
2018	Goiás (28)	Aparecidense
2019	Atlético Goianiense (14)	Goiás
2020	Atlético Goianiense (15)	Goianésia
2021	Grêmio Anápolis (1)	Vila Nova
2022	Atlético Goianiense (16)	Goiás
2023	Atlético Goianiense (17)	Goiás
2024	Atlético Goianiense (18)	Vila Nova
2025	Vila Nova (16)	Anápolis
2026	Goiás (29)	Atlético Goianiense

=== Titles by team ===
Teams in bold still active.

Rank	Club	Winners	Winning years
1	Goiás	29	1966, 1971, 1972, 1975, 1976, 1981, 1983, 1986, 1987, 1989, 1990, 1991, 1994, 1996, 1997, 1998, 1999, 2000, 2002, 2003, 2006, 2009, 2012, 2013, 2015, 2016, 2017, 2018, 2026
2	Atlético Goianiense	18	1944, 1947, 1949, 1955, 1957, 1964, 1970, 1985, 1988, 2007, 2010, 2011, 2014, 2019, 2020, 2022, 2023, 2024
3	Vila Nova	16	1961, 1962, 1963, 1969, 1973, 1977, 1978, 1979, 1980, 1982, 1984, 1993, 1995, 2001, 2005, 2025
4	Goiânia	14	1945, 1946, 1948, 1950, 1951, 1952, 1953, 1954, 1956, 1958, 1959, 1960, 1968, 1974
5	CRAC	2	1967, 2004
6	Anápolis	1	1965
6	Goiatuba	1	1992
6	Grêmio Anápolis	1	2021
6	Itumbiara	1	2008

=== By city ===
City	Championships	Clubs
Goiânia	77	Goiás (29), Atlético Goianiense (18), Vila Nova (16), Goiânia (14)
Anápolis	2	Anápolis (1), Grêmio Anápolis (1)
Catalão	2	CRAC (2)
Goiatuba	1	Goiatuba (1)
Itumbiara	1	Itumbiara (1)
