= Francisco do Amaral =

Francisco do Amaral can refer to:

- Francisco Joaquim Ferreira do Amaral (1843–1923), Portuguese naval commander and politician
- Francisco Keil do Amaral (1910–1975), Portuguese architect, painter and photographer
- Francisco Xavier do Amaral (1937–2012), East Timorian president

== See also ==
- Francisco Vilela do Amaral Airport in Brazil
