= Microregion of Meia Ponte =

Coordinates: 17°44′38″S 48°37′33″W

Meia Ponte
- Microregion
- Location in Goias state
- Country: Brazil
- State: Goiás
- Mesoregion: Sul Goiano
- Municipalities: 21

Area
  - Total: 21,229 km^{2} (8,197 sq mi)

Population (2007)
  - Total: 338,147
  - Density: 16/km^{2} (41/sq mi)

The Meia Ponte Microregion is a statistical region of Goiás state, Brazil created by the IBGE (Instituto Brasileiro de Geografia e Estatística). It is located south of the state capital, Goiânia, and includes 21 municipalities with a total population of 338,147 inhabitants (2007). The total area is 21,229.00 km^{2}. The region takes in the Meia Ponte River basin. The largest cities are Morrinhos, Goiatuba, Itumbiara, and Caldas Novas. The region has great variety in landscape. The north is hillier while the south is characterized by rolling plains with herds of beef cattle and plantations of corn and soybeans.

== Municipalities ==
The microregion consists of the following municipalities:

Name	Population
Água Limpa	2,074
Aloândia	2,065
Bom Jesus de Goiás	19,574
Buriti Alegre	8,287
Cachoeira Dourada	7,567
Caldas Novas	62,204
Cromínia	3,618
Goiatuba	31,225
Inaciolândia	5,650
Itumbiara	88,109
Joviânia	6,731
Mairipotaba	2,655
Marzagão	2,053
Morrinhos	38,997
Panamá	2,618
Piracanjuba	23,310
Pontalina	16,226
Porteirão	3,008
Professor Jamil	3,298
Rio Quente	2,959
Vicentinópolis	5,919

== See also ==
- List of municipalities in Goiás
- Microregions of Goiás
