= Panamá, Goiás =

Panamá
- Municipality
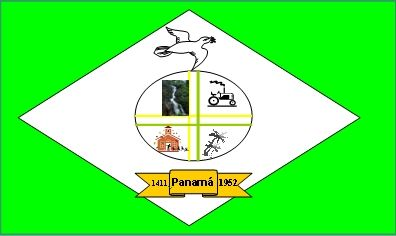
- Flag

- Location in Goiás state

- Location in Brazil
- Coordinates: 18°07′53″S 49°17′03″W
- Country: Brazil
- Region: Central-West
- State: Goiás
- Microregion: Meia Ponte Microregion

Area
  - Total: 443.7 km^{2} (171.3 sq mi)
- Elevation: 733 m (2,405 ft)

Population (2020)
  - Total: 2,603
  - Density: 5.867/km^{2} (15.19/sq mi)
- Time zone: UTC−3 (BRT)
- Postal code: 75580-000

Panamá is a municipality in south Goiás state, Brazil.

== Location ==
Panamá is located in the Meia Ponte Microregion and is about 25 kilometers north of the border with the state of Minas Gerais. It is a short distance west of the important BR-153 highway which links São Paulo to Belém. Panamá is 26 kilometers south of Goiatuba and 25 kilometers from Itumbiara. The distance to Goiânia is 188 km.

Neighboring municipalities are:

- north: Goiatuba
- south and west: Itumbiara
- east: Bom Jesus de Goiás

== History ==
Panamá began with the building of a chapel by a local landowner. In 1931 it became a district of Santa Rita do Paranaíba, present-day Itumbiara with the name Divinópolis. In 1943 the name was changed to Panamá and Santa Rita changed to Itumbiara. In 1950 it was dismembered from Itumbiara. The name comes from a small river called Panamá.

== Political Information ==
- Mayor: Divino Alexandre da Silva (January 2013)
- City council: 9

== Demographics ==
- Population density: 6.04 inhabitants/km^{2} (2007)
- Urban population: 1,995 (2007)
- Rural population: 623 (2007)
- Population growth 2000-2007: -0,83%

== Economy ==
The economy is based on agriculture, cattle raising, services, public administration, and small transformation industries.

- Industrial units: 2 (2007)
- Commercial units: 24 (2007)
- Cattle herd: 27,800 head (2006)
- Main crops (2006): cotton (700 hectares), rice (400 hectares), sugarcane, oranges, manioc, corn, and soybeans (5,700 hectares).

In 2006 there were 221 farmers with a planted area of 6,368 hectares. The total agricultural area was 16,567 ha.. Pasture made up 9,290 ha.

== Education ==
- Schools: 3
- Students: 795
- Middle schools and students: 1 with 155 students
- Higher education: none
- Adult literacy rate: 81.9% (2000) (national average was 86.4%)

== Health ==
- Hospitals: 0
- Hospital beds: 0
- Ambulatory clinics: 1
- Infant mortality rate: 23.05 (2000) (national average was 33.0)

The United Nations Human Development Index (2000) ranked Panamá 131 out of 242 municipalities in the state of Goiás with a score of 0.733.

For the complete list see Frigoletto

== See also ==
- List of municipalities in Goiás
