= Cachoeira Dourada =

- Municipality
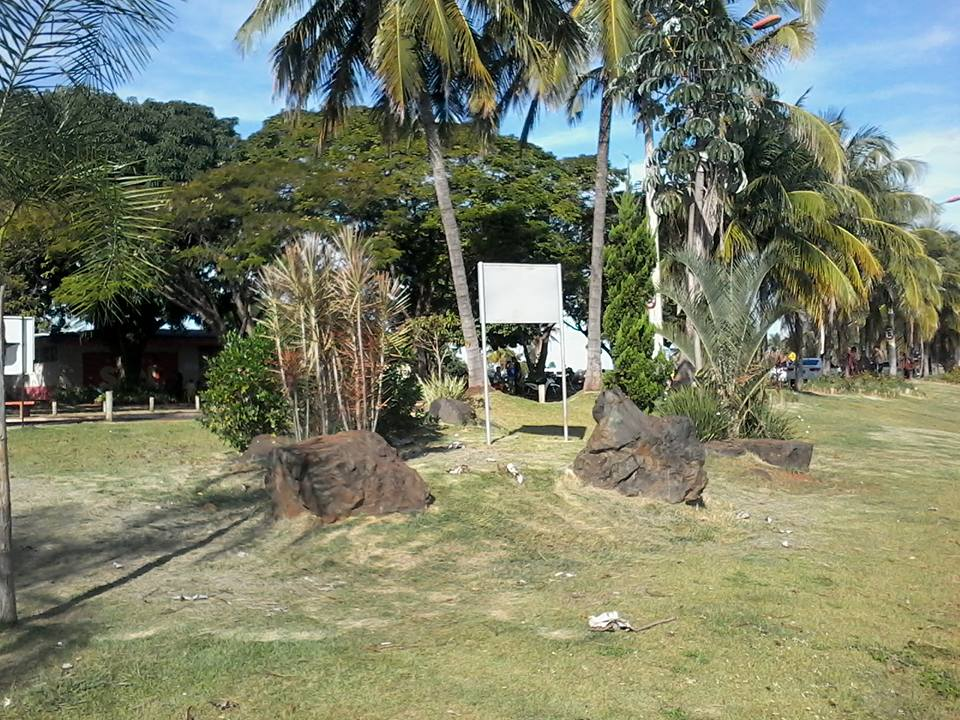

- Flag

- Location in Goiás state

- Location in Brazil
- Coordinates: 18°29′44″S 49°28′04″W
- Country: Brazil
- Region: Central-West
- State: Goiás
- Microregion: Meia Ponte Microregion

Area
  - Total: 521.1 km^{2} (201.2 sq mi)
- Elevation: 459 m (1,506 ft)

Population (2020)
  - Total: 8,031
  - Density: 15.41/km^{2} (39.92/sq mi)
- Time zone: UTC−3 (BRT)
- Postal code: 75560-000

Cachoeira Dourada is municipality in south-central Goiás state, Brazil. The population was 8,031 (2020) in a total area of 521.1 km^{2}.

== Geographical Information ==
The municipality of Cachoeira Dourada is located in the extreme south of Goiás at a distance of 258 kilometers from the state capital, Goiânia. It lies on the banks of the Paranaíba and is 31 kilometers southwest of the important city of Itumbiara. It is part of the geographical microregion designated Meia Ponte Microregion.

There are boundaries on the north and east with Itumbiara, on the south with the Paranaíba, and on the west with Inaciolândia. The main access routes are GO-260, GO-153, GO-452, MG-154 and MG-365.

The distance to state capital, Goiânia, is 228 km. Highway connections from Goiânia are made by BR-153 / Aparecida de Goiânia / Professor Jamil / Serrinha (district) / Itumbiara / BR-452 / GO-206 / BR-483. Source for distances: Sepin

Besides the municipal seat there were the hamlets (Povoados) of Almeirindonópolis, Nilópolis, Pontezinha and Vila Operária da Celg.

== Demographic and political facts ==
- Population density in 2007: 14.52 inhabitants/km^{2}
- Population growth rate 1996/2007: -0.76.%
- Total population in 2007: 7,567
- Total population in 1991: 8,502
- Urban population in 2007: 5,085
- Rural population in 2007: 2,482
- City government in 2005: mayor (Lauro Vinicius Ramos), vice-mayor (José Dantas da Silva), and 09 councilmembers

(Sepin/IBGE)

Cachoeira Dourada was first made a district of Itumbiara in 1962, becoming a municipality in 1982

== Economic activities ==
The main economic activities are cattle raising (34,190 in 2006), agriculture, and the hydroelectric energy plant. Cotton, corn, and soybeans are the most important crops.

- Retail establishments: 100 in 2007
- Industrial establishments: 09
- Financial institutions: 03—HSBC, Banco do Brasil S.A., Banco Multiplo
- Dairies: Miqueline Ltda.

(Sepin/IBGE)

=== Planted Area of Main Crops (2006) ===
- Rice: 500 ha.
- Corn: 4,000 ha.
- Bananas: 80 ha.
- Beans: 120 ha.
- Soybeans: 4,700 ha.
- Cotton: 680 ha. (Sepin)

=== Farm Data (2006) ===
- Farms: 157
- Total area: 31,630 ha.
- Area of permanent crops: 132 ha.
- Area of perennial crops: 9,013 ha.
- Area of natural pasture: 19,073 ha.
- Persons dependent on farming: 600
- Farms with tractors: 92
- Number of tractors: 177 IBGE

== Health (2007) ==
- Infant mortality rate in 2000: 16.68
- Infant mortality rate in 1990: 29.47
- Total health units: 04
- Hospitals: 01 with 16 beds

(Sepin/IBGE)

== Education (2006) ==
- Literacy rate in 2000: 82.6
- Literacy rate in 1991: 73.2
- Schools: 08 with 2,667 students

(Sepin/IBGE)

=== Ranking on the Municipal Human Development Index ===
- MHDI: 0.759
- State ranking: 56 (out of 242 municipalities)
- National ranking: 1,603 (out of 5,507 municipalities)

(Frigoletto)

== Tourism ==
In tourism, the artificial lake formed by the Itumbiara Dam on the Paranaíba is the main attraction. The lake is navigable between Cachoeira Dourada and Itumbiara, a distance of 64 kilometers. The region has springs of hot, salty water, a unique phenomenon in the country. This water is consumed for its reputed therapeutic qualities.

== See also ==
- List of municipalities in Goiás
- Shirley Paes Leme, from Cachoeira Dourada
