= RedeTV! Itumbiara =

- Itumbiara, Goiás; Brazil
- Channels: Analog: 4 (VHF)
- Branding: RedeTV! Itumbiara

Programming
- Affiliations: RedeTV!

Ownership
- Owner: Lopes Comunicações e Representações Ltda.

History
- First air date: November 1, 2009
- Last air date: October 13, 2012

RedeTV! Itumbiara was a Brazilian television station, based in the municipality of Itumbiara, in the state of Goiás. The station was broadcast on VHF channel 4 and was affiliated with RedeTV!.

Despite the name, it was not a RedeTV! owned-and-operated station. The TV facilities operated at the headquarters of the Folha de Notícias newspaper.

The station went on air in 2009 until it was closed in 2012 by ANATEL, accused of being a pirate TV station.

== History ==
RedeTV! Itumbiara began broadcasting on channel 4 on October 25, 2009, at 4:44pm, initially on an experimental basis, so that the station's technicians could make the necessary adjustments and tests to provide the best sound and image quality in Itumbiara and surrounding areas, after the establishment of the station's studios.

The station's tower was installed at the headquarters of the Folha de Notícias newspaper, located on Avenida Afonso Pena, without number, at Bairro Jardim América, the highest location in the city, so that the entire city and surrounding areas receive the station's signal without any major difficulties.

On November 1, after an experimental period, as well as adjustments and tests and the implementation of the studios, the station was officially opened. After being opened, it became the second TV station in the city, ending the monopoly of the only station in the city, TV Anhanguera Itumbiara (channel 11) and starts broadcasting the first local program: Plantão Policial, which aired every day at 11:55am and 6:10pm and was presented by Luis Alves. The station had more local programming than the TV Anhanguera station, which only produced two 10-minute local blocks during the two daily editions of Jornal Anhanguera.

With the new station, RedeTV! had gained its third affiliate in Goiás, the other two being VTV (Goiânia, channel 49) and TV Planalto (Jataí, channel 6), but the stations were later closed in 2011.

The station had already become popular with the Itumbiarese people and had 89% of the audience in the city for its local programs, and wanted more local programming, especially the youth, as there were little options for the target audience in the station's afternoons.

== Shutdown in 2012 ==
After RedeTV! Itumbiara went air on channel 4, it generated controversy: it was seen as a pirate TV station, as there was no authorization from Anatel to operate. There is no TV channel concession for Itumbiara other than channel 11, currently operated by Sistema Paranaíba de Comunicações (TV Rio Paranaíba).

Channel 4 used illegal transmission methods instead of RTV (TV Retransmitter) at Anatel, which at the time was pre-registered to transmit the signal from EBC (Empresa Brasileira de Comunicação, from TV Brasil), which was later passed on to TV Alterosa. The grant is from the Municipality of Itumbiara.

The location of the transmitter (TV tower) was also illegal, as it was located at the headquarters of the Folha de Notícias newspaper and in the authorization of the Anatel website, it was actually RTV, but on Ulbra's Experimental Farm.

Several complaints were being made to Anatel and the Ministry of Communications, but no action was taken, reinforcing suspicions of protection for the political group linked to the then mayor José Gomes.

On the morning of October 13, 2012, RedeTV! Itumbiara was closed by ANATEL agents.
