= Bom Jesus de Goiás =

- Municipality
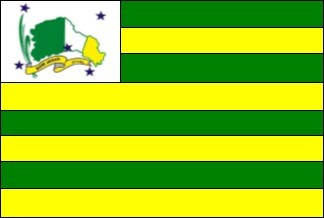
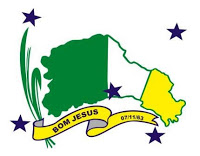
- Flag Coat of arms

- Location in Goiás state

- Location in Brazil
- Coordinates: 18°13′12″S 49°43′39″W
- Country: Brazil
- Region: Central-West
- State: Goiás
- Microregion: Meia Ponte Microregion

Area
  - Total: 1,405.2 km^{2} (542.6 sq mi)
- Elevation: 619 m (2,031 ft)

Population (2020)
  - Total: 25,648
  - Density: 18.252/km^{2} (47.273/sq mi)
- Time zone: UTC−3 (BRT)
- Postal code: 75570-000

Bom Jesus de Goiás is a municipality in south Goiás state, Brazil. It is a large producer of soybeans.

== Geographical Information ==
The distance to the state capital, Goiânia, is 223 km and it is linked by highways BR-452 and GO-040. It forms boundaries with Goiatuba (north); Inaciolândia and Itumbiara (south); Itumbiara and Panamá (east); and Quirinópolis (west).

The land is mainly flat, which favors agriculture. The municipality extends from the Meia Ponte River to the Rio dos Bois, which flow into the Paranaíba River.

The climate is moist tropical with temperatures oscillating between 28 °C and 38 °C, with an average maximum of 30 °C. Rains are constant in the period between October and March. The fauna is diversified with the presence of tamandua, tatu, capivara, reptiles, and many birds.

== History ==
In 1925, a local rancher, Dona Carolina Viera da Mota, donated lands to build a future settlement. In the same year a chapel covered with palm fronds was built. Soon, other houses (huts) were built and the settlement was called Bom Jesus. In 1953, it was made a district of Goiatuba, becoming a municipality in 1963.

== Demographic and political data ==
- Population density in 2007: 13.93 inhabitants/km^{2}
- Population growth rate from 1996-2007: 2.69%
- Total population in 2007: 19,574
- Total population in 1980: 11,623
- Urban population in 2007: 18,218
- Rural population in 2007: 1,356
- City government in 2005: mayor (Feliciano Florindo de Oliverira)

== Economy ==
The economy is based on agriculture, especially the growing of soybeans, corn, and sugarcane. The farming is all mechanized and the landholdings are large or medium and mainly owned by people who came from the south of the country like Paraná and Rio Grande do Sul.

- Number of industrial establishments: 24
- Industrial district: Distrito Agroindustrial de Bom Jesus de Goiás – DIAB (June/2006)
- Number of retail commercial establishments: 257
- Financial institutions: Banco do Brasil S.A. - BRADESCO S.A. - Banco Itaú S.A. - Caixa Económica Federal.
- Automobiles: 2,535

=== Cattle raising and agricultural production ===
- Cattle: 60,825
- Sugarcane: 7,300 hectares
- Corn: 18,300 hectares
- Soybeans: 59,500 hectares (state leader is Rio Verde)
- Sorghum: 10,000 hectares

Agricultural data 2006

- Farms: 425
- Total area: 118,674 ha.
- Area of permanent crops: 810 ha.
- Area of perennial crops: 56,339 ha.
- Area of natural pasture: 39,912 ha.
- Area of woodland and forests: 19,879 ha.
- Persons dependent on farming: 1,350
- Farms with tractors: 161
- Number of tractors: 493 IBGE

== Health (2007) ==
- Infant mortality in 2000: 15.81
- Infant mortality in 1990: 29.47
- Health establishments: 10 (05 private)
- Hospitals: 03 with 53 beds

(IBGE 2002)

== Education (2006) ==
- Literacy rate in 2000: 84.4
- Literacy rate in 1991: 79.7
- Schools: 14 with 5,631 students
- Higher education: none reported for 2006

(IBGE 2004)

Ranking on the Municipal Human Development Index

- MHDI: 0.772
- State ranking: 38 (out of 242 municipalities)
- National ranking: 1,283 (out of 5,507 municipalities)

== See also ==
- List of municipalities in Goiás
