= Inaciolândia =

- Municipality
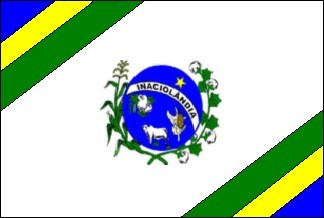
- Flag

- Location in Goiás state

- Location in Brazil
- Coordinates: 18°29′18″S 49°59′04″W
- Country: Brazil
- Region: Central-West
- State: Goiás
- Microregion: Meia Ponte Microregion

Area
  - Total: 688.3 km^{2} (265.8 sq mi)
- Elevation: 442 m (1,450 ft)

Population (2020)
  - Total: 6,235
  - Density: 9.059/km^{2} (23.46/sq mi)
- Time zone: UTC−3 (BRT)
- Postal code: 75550-000

Inaciolândia is a municipality in south Goiás state, Brazil. The population was 6,235 inhabitants (2020 IBGE) in a total area of 688.3 km^{2}. Inaciolândia is a large producer of cotton and soybeans.

== Geographical Information ==
Inaciolândia is located in the Meia Ponte Microregion in the extreme south of the state. It is connected by paved road to Cachoeira Dourada, 57 km., and Gouvelândia, 15 km. The Rio dos Bois lies a short distance to the west.

The distance to the state capital, Goiânia, is 282 km. Highway connections are made by GO-040, passing through Aragoiânia / Cromínia, taking GO-215 to Pontalina, then GO-040 to Aloândia and Bom Jesus de Goiás, taking BR-452 to Itumbiara, then GO-206 / BR-483 passing through Cachoeira Dourada. For the complete list of distances in Goiás see Sepin

Neighboring municipalities are:

- north: Bom Jesus de Goiás and Itumbiara
- south: Minas Gerais
- east: Gouvelândia
- west: Cachoeira Dourada

== Political data ==
- Mayor: Gilson José Teixeira (January 2005)
- Vice-mayor: Paulo César Sisdelli
- Councilmembers: 09

== Demographics ==
- Population density: 8.21 inhabitants/km^{2} (2007)
- Population growth rate 1996/2007: 1.12%
- Urban population in 2007: 4,582
- Rural population in 2007: 1,068

== The economy ==
The economy is based on agriculture, cattle raising, small transformation industries, services, and government employment.

Economic data

- Industrial units: 05 ((June/2007))
- Retail units: 48 (August/2007)
- Lodging and restaurants: 04 units
- Banking institutions: Banco do Brasil S.A. (August/2007)
- Automobiles: 252 in 2007

(Sepin/IBGE)

Main agricultural activities

- Cattle raising: 51,965 head (2006)
- Cotton: 830 ha.
- Rice: 400 ha.
- Rubber: 116 ha.
- Sugarcane: 1,200 ha.
- Corn: 2,200 ha.
- Soybeans: 11,300 ha.
- Agricultural establishments: 421
- Total agricultural area: 62,157 ha.
- Area of perennial crops: 1,923 ha.
- Area of permanent crops: 20,712 ha.
- Area of natural pasture: 32,020 ha.
- Workers in agriculture: 1,170 IBGE

== Education and health ==
- Literacy rate: 78.5%
- Infant mortality rate: 26.58 in 1,000 live births
- Schools: 4
- Students: 1,804 (2006)
- Hospitals: 1 (2007)
- Hospital beds: 16

(Sepin/IBGE)

Inaciolândia is ranked 0.717 on the 2000 United Nations Human Development Index and is 179 out of 242 municipalities in the state. For the complete list see Frigoletto

== See also ==
- List of municipalities in Goiás
- Meia Ponte Microregion
