= Ricardo Boiadeiro =

Brazilian footballer (born 1976)

Personal information
- Date of birth: February 18, 1976
- Place of birth: Brazil
- Position: Forward

Senior career*
Years	Team	Apps	(Gls)
2001	Palmeiras	1	(0)
- * Club domestic league appearances and goals

Ricardo Boiadeiro (18 February 1976) is a former Brazilian football player.

== Career ==
Boiadeiro started his career in 1997 with Itumbiara. He moved to South Korea to play for Pohang Steelers. In 2001 he played for Olaria in the Campeonato Carioca, scoring 12 goals in 15 matches. He then moved to Palmeiras as a forward. He made 1 appearance in the Campeonato Brasileiro Série A.
