= Araporã =

Town and municipality in the state of Minas Gerais, Brazil

Coordinates: 18°26′13″S 49°11′13″W

- Municipality
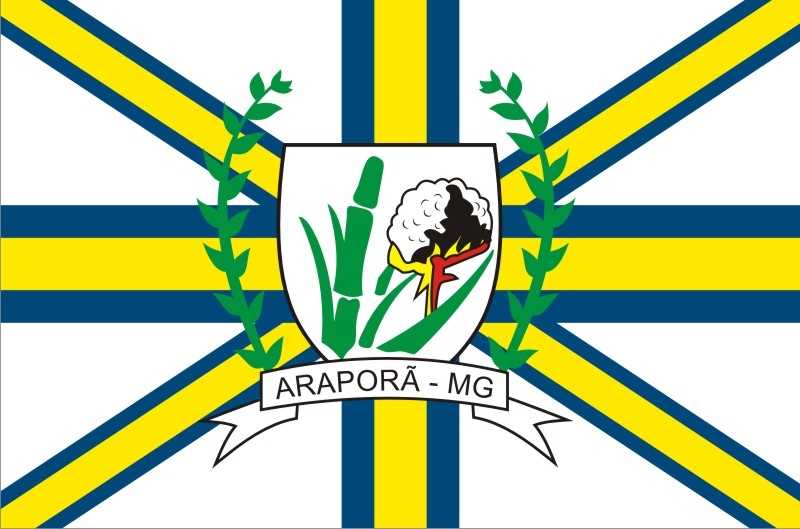
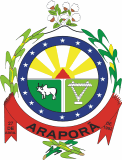
- Flag Coat of arms
- Interactive map of Araporã
- Country: Brazil
- State: Minas Gerais
- Region: Southeast
- Time zone: UTC−3 (BRT)

Location of Araporã in the state of Minas Gerais, Brazil

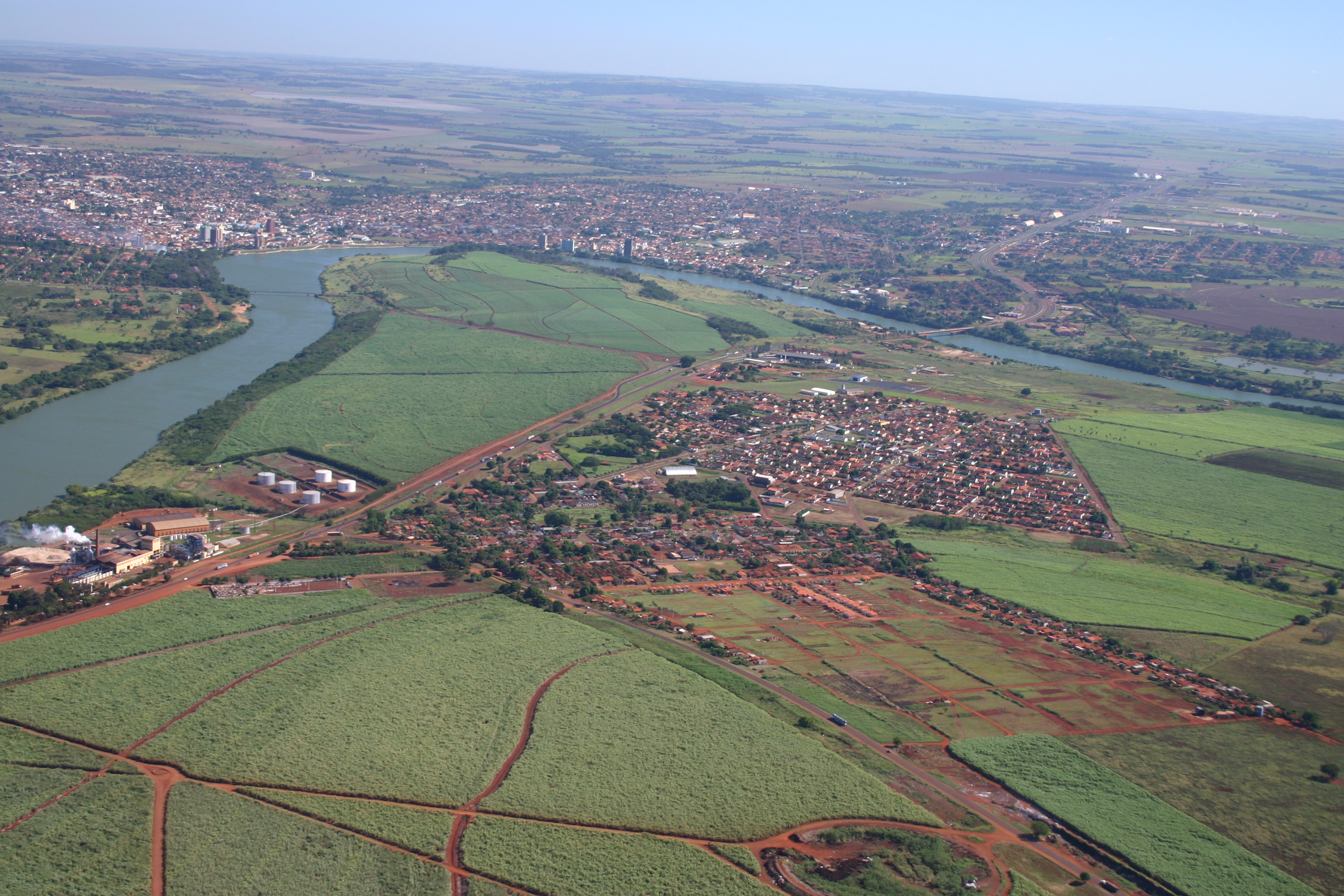
Aerial view of Araporã

Araporã (Brazilian Portuguese: /aɾapoˈɾɐ̃/) is a Brazilian municipality located in the west of the state of Minas Gerais. Its population as of 2020 was 6,931 people living in a total area of 298 square kilometres (115 sq mi). The city belongs to the statistical mesoregion of Triângulo Mineiro and Alto Paranaíba and to the microregion of Uberlândia. It became a municipality in 1992.

== Geography ==
Araporã is located at an elevation of 474 meters (1,555 ft) in the north of the rich region known as the Triângulo Mineiro. It is on the eastern bank of the Paranaíba River, just west of the great reservoir of Barragem Itumbiara. The important regional center of Itumbiara is across the river and is connected by bridge. Federal highway BR-153, which links Uberlândia with Goiânia passes through the town.

The distance to Uberlândia is 124 kilometres (77 mi); the distance to Itumbiara is 11 kilometres (7 mi); and the distance to Belo Horizonte is 700 kilometres (430 mi). Neighboring municipalities are: Itumbiara (N) and [W]; Centralina(S); Tupaciguara and Monte Alegre de Minas (E)

== Economy ==
The main economic activities are industry, services, and agriculture, especially the growing of sugarcane. The GDP in 2005 was R$1 billion three hundred million, with 102 million from services, 938 million from industry, and 15 million from agriculture. The per capita GDP was the second highest in the state. Much of the income comes from royalties due to the construction of the hydroelectric plant of Itumbiara. There were 148 rural producers on 24,000 hectares of land. 59 farms had tractors. The main crops were pineapple, sugarcane, beans, and corn. There were 7,500 head of cattle (2006).

In Araporã there is an alcohol and sugar plant, Usina Alvorada. This industry generated R$118 million in 2007 and employed 1,500 workers. It receives sugarcane from 40 producers. In 1972, when it began, it processed 350,000 tons of sugarcane, while in 2007/2008 the estimate is for 1,500,000 tons.

== Municipal social indicators ==
Its social indicators rank it in the top tier of municipalities in the state.

- Municipal Human Development Index: 0.780 (2000)
- State ranking: 115 out of 853 municipalities as of 2000
- National ranking: 1,055 out of 5,138 municipalities as of 2000
- Literacy rate: 88%
- Life expectancy: 72 (average of males and females)

The highest ranking municipality in Minas Gerais in 2000 was Poços de Caldas with 0.841, while the lowest was Setubinha with 0.568. Nationally the highest was São Caetano do Sul in São Paulo with 0.919, while the lowest was Setubinha. In more recent statistics (considering 5,507 municipalities) Manari in the state of Pernambuco has the lowest rating in the country—0,467—putting it in last place.

== See also ==
- List of municipalities in Minas Gerais
