= Itumbiara Airport =

Francisco Vilela do Amaral Airport Aeroporto Francisco Vilela do Amaral
- IATA: ITR; ICAO: SBIT; LID: GO0035

Summary
- Airport type: Private
- Serves: Itumbiara
- Time zone: BRT (UTC−03:00)
- Elevation AMSL: 497 m (1,631 ft)
- Coordinates: 18°26′42″S 049°12′51″W

Map
- Location in Brazil

Runways
Direction	Length		Surface
Direction	m	ft	Surface
18/36	1,750	5,741	Asphalt
- Sources: ANAC, DECEA

Francisco Vilela do Amaral Airport (IATA: ITR, ICAO: SBIT) is the airport serving Itumbiara, Brazil.

== Airlines and destinations ==
No scheduled flights operate at this airport.

== Access ==
The airport is located 7 km (4 mi) from downtown Itumbiara.

== See also ==
- List of airports in Brazil
