= Novo Horizonte Futebol Clube =

Novo Horizonte
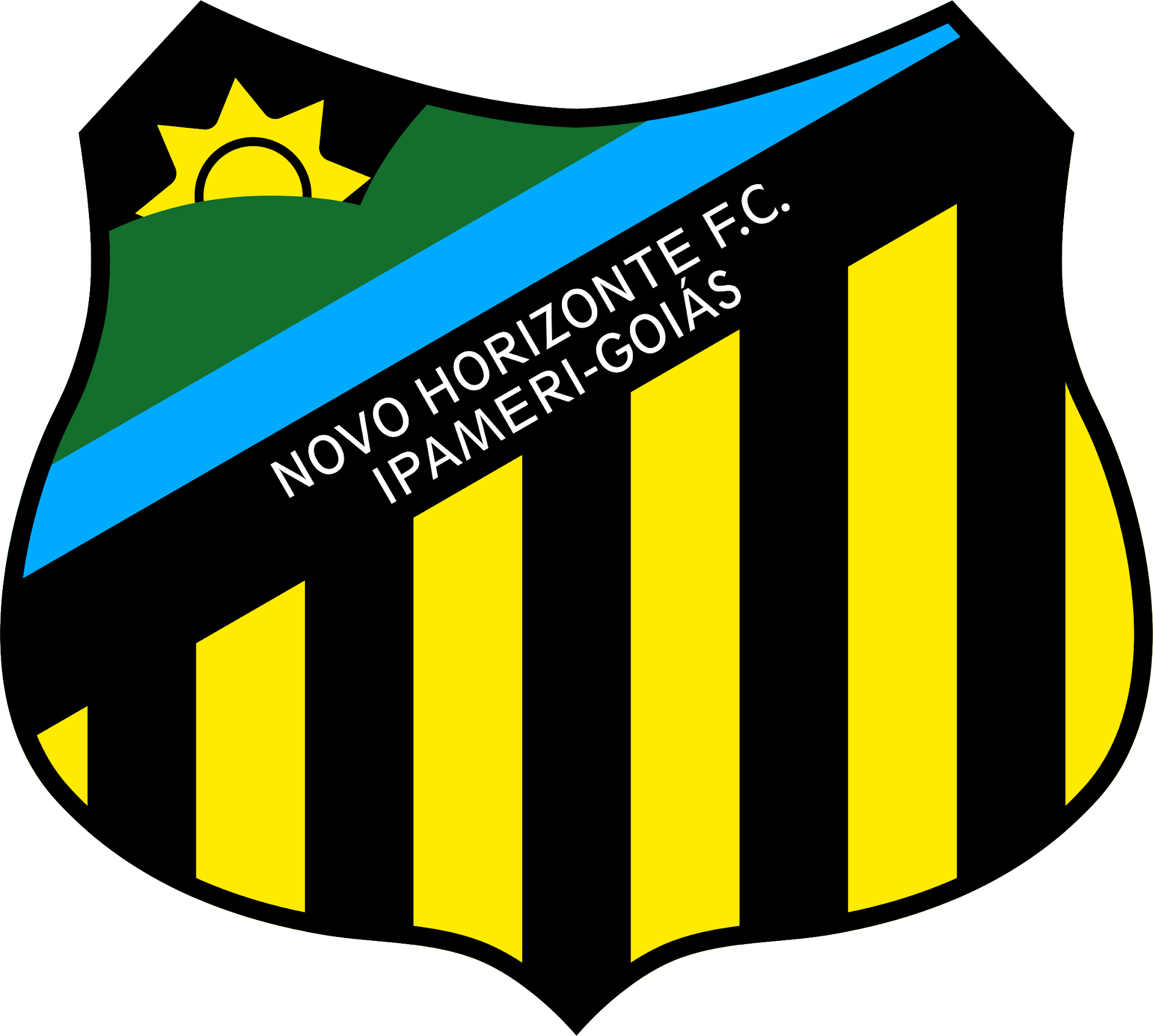
- Full name: Novo Horizonte Futebol Clube
- Nicknames: Fantasma; Zonte
- Founded: February 27, 1968
- Ground: Estádio Durval Ferreira Franco, Ipameri, Goiás state, Brazil
- Capacity: 1,904
Home colors	Away colors	Third colors

Novo Horizonte Futebol Clube, commonly known as Novo Horizonte, is a Brazilian football club based in Ipameri, Goiás state. They competed in the Série C and in the Copa do Brasil once.

== History ==
The club was founded on February 27, 1968. Novo Horizonte won the Campeonato Goiano Second Level in 2007. The club competed in the Série C in 2002, when they were eliminated in the Second Stage of the competition by Anápolis. Novo Horizonte competed in the Copa do Brasil in 2004, when they were eliminated in the first round by Santo André from São Paulo state, who would go on to win the tournament, surprising Flamengo in the final.

== Honours ==
- Campeonato Goiano
  - Runners-up (2): 2002, 2003
- Campeonato Goiano Second Division:
  - Winners (1): 2007
- Campeonato Goiano Third Division:
  - Winners (1): 2013

== Stadium ==
Novo Horizonte Futebol Clube play their home games at Estádio Durval Ferreira Franco. The stadium has a maximum capacity of 1,904 people.
