= Tupaciguara =

Town and municipality in the state of Minas Gerais, Brazil

Coordinates: 18°35′34″S 48°42′18″W

- Municipality
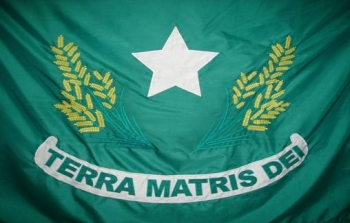
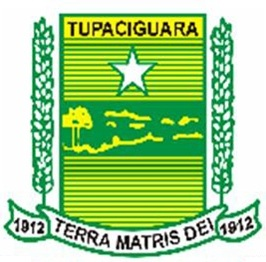
- Flag Coat of arms
- Interactive map of Tupaciguara
- Country: Brazil
- State: Minas Gerais
- Region: Southeast
- Time zone: UTC−3 (BRT)

Location of Tupaciguara in the state of Minas Gerais, Brazil

Tupaciguara is a Brazilian municipality located in the west of the state of Minas Gerais. Its population as of 2020 was 25,398 peoples living in a total area of 1,826 km^{2}. The city belongs to the statistical mesoregion of Triângulo Mineiro and Alto Paranaíba and to the statistical microregion of Uberlândia. It became a municipality in 1911.

== Geography ==
Tupaciguara is located at an elevation of 865 meters in the rich region known as the Triângulo Mineiro. It is northwest of Uberlândia and lies on the southern boundary of the Itumbiara reservoir.

The distance to Uberlândia is 69 km; and the distance to Belo Horizonte is 617 km. Neighboring municipalities are: the state of Goiás (N); Araporã (W); Monte Alegre de Minas(S); Uberlândia and Araguari(E)

== Economy ==
The main economic activities are services, agriculture, and small industries. The GDP in 2005 was R$208,269,000.00, with 106,000,000.00 from services, 15,000,000.00 from industry, and 73,000,000.00 from agriculture. There were 601 rural producers on 140,000 hectares of land. 235 farms had tractors. The main crops were coffee, cotton, peanuts, sugarcane, beans, sorghum, corn, and soybeans (30,000 hectares). There were 104,000 head of cattle (2006) and 267,000 head of poultry.

== Municipal social indicators ==
The social indicators rank it in the top tier of municipalities in the state.

- Municipal Human Development Index: 0.780 (2000)
- State ranking: 112 out of 853 municipalities as of 2000
- National ranking: 1042 out of 5,138 municipalities as of 2000
- Literacy rate: 86%
- Life expectancy: 74 (average of males and females)

The highest ranking municipality in Minas Gerais in 2000 was Poços de Caldas with 0.841, while the lowest was Setubinha with 0.568. Nationally the highest was São Caetano do Sul in São Paulo with 0.919, while the lowest was Setubinha. In more recent statistics (considering 5,507 municipalities) Manari in the state of Pernambuco has the lowest rating in the country—0,467—putting it in last place.

== Health ==
There was one hospital with 29 beds in 2005. Patients with more serious health conditions are taken care of in Uberlândia or Araguari.

== See also ==
- List of municipalities in Minas Gerais
