= Marzagão =

- Municipality
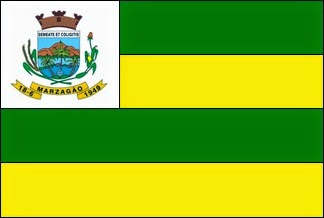
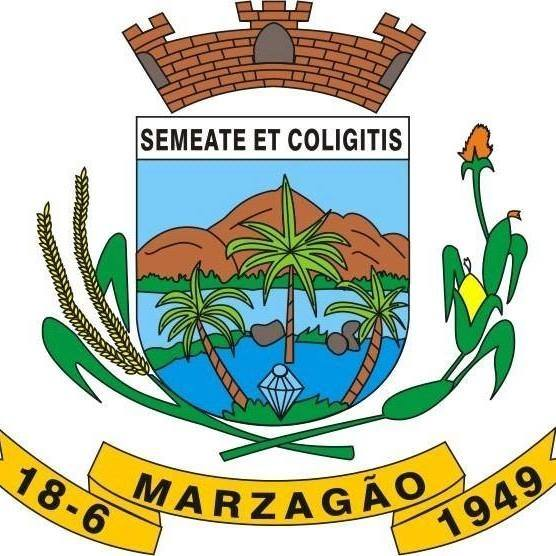
- Flag Coat of arms

- Location in Goiás state

- Location in Brazil
- Coordinates: 17°59′11″S 48°37′03″W
- Country: Brazil
- Region: Central-West
- State: Goiás
- Microregion: Meia Ponte Microregion

Area
  - Total: 228.8 km^{2} (88.3 sq mi)
- Elevation: 604 m (1,982 ft)

Population (2020)
  - Total: 2,250
  - Density: 9.83/km^{2} (25.5/sq mi)
- Time zone: UTC−3 (BRT)
- Postal code: 75670-000

Marzagão is a municipality in south Goiás state, Brazil.

== Location ==
Marzagão is located in the Meia Ponte Microregion in the extreme south of the state, less than 100 km (62 mi) north of the great Itumbiara reservoir, which forms the boundary with the state of Minas Gerais. There are paved road connections with Água Limpa, 22 km (14 mi), and Caldas Novas, 33 km (21 mi).

The distance to the state capital, Goiânia, is 100 km. Highway connections are made by GO-040 / Aragoiânia / Cromínia / GO-217. See Sepin for the complete list of distances in the state of Goiás

Municipal boundaries are with:

- north and east: Caldas Novas
- west: Rio Quente
- south: Água Limpa and Corumbaíba

== History ==
Marzagão began at the beginning of the twentieth century on lands belonging to the Fazenda Boa Vista de Marzagão, in the municipality of Caldas Novas. Because of its position on the highway linking Goiás with Minas Gerais it developed quickly. In 1916 it became a district of Caldas Novas. In 1938 the name was shortened from Boa Vista de Marzagão to Marzagão. In 1949 it was dismembered from Caldas Novas and had two districts—Marzagão and Água Limpa. In 1958 Água Limpa was itself dismembered to become a separate municipality.

== Politics ==
For the period of 2004-2008 the mayor was Claudinei Rabelo da Silva and the vice-mayor was Neilton Marcelino de Souza. There were 1,734 eligible voters in 2007.

== Demographics ==
In 2007 the population density was 9.00 inhabitants/km^{2}. The population has almost doubled since 1980 when there were 1,095 inhabitants. From 1991 to 2000 the growth rate was 3.53.% and from 2000 to 2007 it was 0.96%. Most of the population is urban: 1,781 urban inhabitants and 272 rural inhabitants in 2007.

== Economy ==
The economy is based on services, public employment, modest transformation industries, cattle raising, and agriculture.

The cattle herd had 17,890 head in 2006. Poultry and swine production was modest. The main agricultural products in planted area were rice and corn. In 2006 there were 95 agricultural producers with 798 hectares of planted crops. Eighty five of these farmers had tractors. The total agricultural area was 19,092 ha., of which 14,613 ha. were natural pasture.

== Health and education ==
In 2007 there was 1 hospital with 29 beds and 2 walk-in health clinics. The infant mortality rate was 13.91 in 2000, which was well below the national and state average. In 2006 the school system had 2 primary schools with 492 students and 01 middle school with 116 students. There were no institutions of higher education. The adult literacy rate was 85.7% in 2000.

Marzagão is a relatively prosperous town. The United Nations Human Development Index (2000) ranked Marzagão 33 out of 242 municipalities in the state of Goiás and 1090 out of 5505 municipalities in all the country with a score of 0.779.

Ranking on the Municipal Human Development Index

- MHDI: 0.779
- State ranking: 33 (out of 242 municipalities)
- National ranking: 1,090 (out of 5,507 municipalities) For the complete list see Frigoletto.com

== See also ==
- List of municipalities in Goiás
- Meia Ponte Microregion
