= Estádio JK =

Multi-use stadium in Itumbiara, Goiás, Brazil

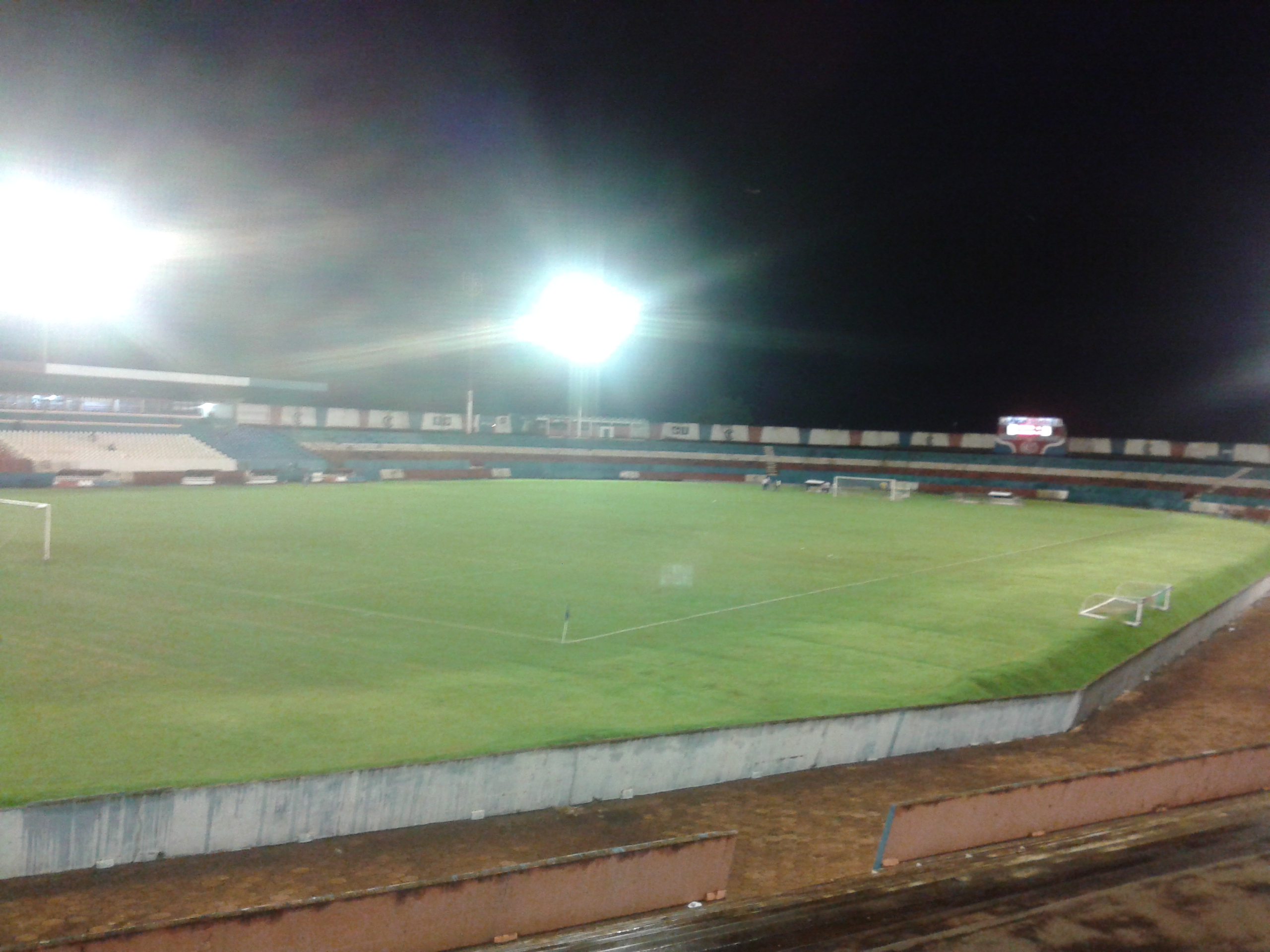
- Interactive map of Estádio JK
- Full name: Estádio Municipal Juscelino Kubitschek
- Location: Itumbiara, Goiás, Brazil
- Coordinates: 18°24′31″S 49°14′37″W
- Owner: Itumbiara City Hall
- Capacity: 14,445

Construction
- Built: 1977
- Opened: October 12, 1977

Tenant
- Itumbiara Esporte Clube

Estádio Municipal Juscelino Kubitschek, usually known as Estádio JK, is a multi-use stadium in Itumbiara, Goiás, Brazil. It is currently used mostly for football matches. The stadium holds 14,445. It was built in 1977.

The stadium is owned by the Itumbiara City Hall. It is named after Juscelino Kubitschek, who was president of Brazil from 1956 to 1961.

== History ==
In 1977, the works on Estádio JK were completed. The inaugural match was played on October 12 of that year, when Itumbiara Esporte Clube and Vasco da Gama drew 0-0. The stadium's attendance record currently stands at 41,235, set in the inaugural match.

The first goal of the stadium was scored by Itumbiara's Zé Carlos, on October 19, 1977.

On March 7, 1984, the largest goal score of the stadium was set, when Itumbiara beat Goiás 6–1.
