= Goiatuba =

Goiatuba, Brazil
- Municipality
- Municipality of Goiatuba
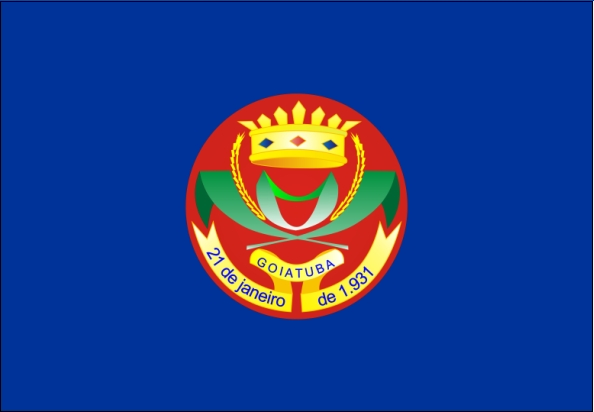
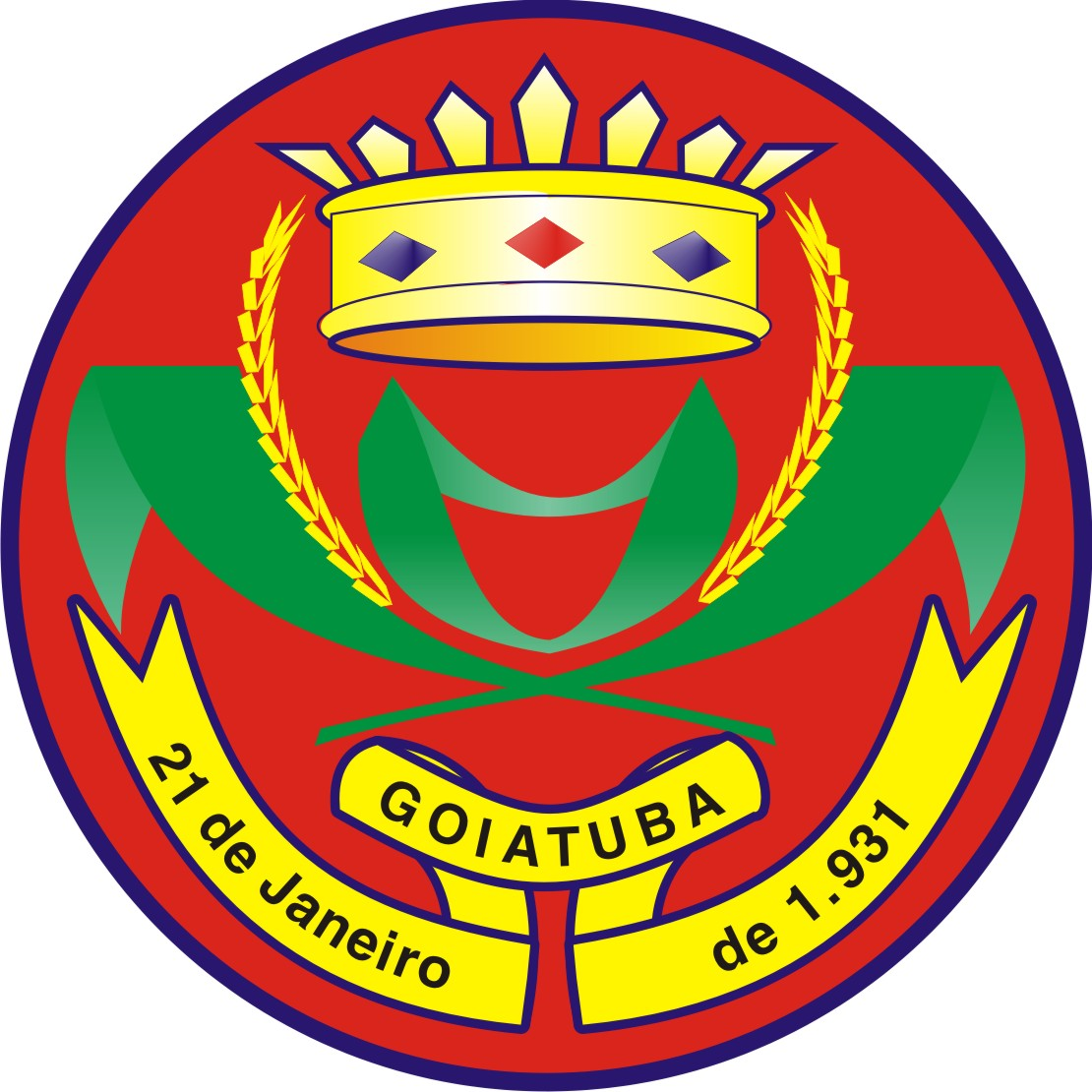
- Flag Coat of arms
- Nickname: The Princess
- Location of Goiatuba

- Location in Brazil
- Coordinates: 18°0′40″S 49°21′25″W
- Country: Brazil
- Region: Central-West
- State: Goiás
- Founded: January 21, 1931

Government
  - Mayor: Zezinho Vieira(PP)

Area
  - Total: 2,470.307 km^{2} (953.791 sq mi)
- Elevation: 720 m (2,360 ft)

Population (2020)
  - Total: 34,202
  - Density: 13.13/km^{2} (34.0/sq mi)
- Time zone: UTC−3 (BRT)
- Postal Code: 75600-000
- Area code: +55 64
- Website: Goiatuba, Goiás

Goiatuba is a municipality in south-central Goiás state, Brazil. The population was 34,202 (2020 IBGE) in a total area of 2,470.3 km^{2}. Goiatuba is a large producer of grains, especially soybeans and corn.

== Climate and Location ==
The average elevation is 775 meters, with an annual temperature average of 22 °C. The climate is typically tropical, moist and hot, with well-defined dry and rainy seasons. Average temperatures vary between 19 °C and 30 °C.

Goiatuba is about 50 kilometers north of the Paranaíba River, which forms the boundary with the state of Minas Gerais. It is 10 kilometers from the important interstate highway BR-153, which links Itumbiara with the state capital, Goiânia. The distance to Goiânia is 176 kilometers.

Municipal boundaries are:

- North: Vicentinópolis and Joviânia;
- Northeast and East: Morrinhos and Buriti Alegre;
- South: Itumbiara and Panamá
- Southwest: Castelândia and Bom Jesus de Goiás;
- West and Northwest: Porteirão and Edéia
- Districts: Marcianópolis.
- Hamlets: Rochelândia, Santo Antônio, Serrinha and Venda Seca.

== Demographics ==
- Population density: 12.62 inhabitants/km^{2} (2007)
- Population growth rate 1996/2007: 0.04.%
- Total population: 31,225
- Total population: 26,937
- Urban population in 2007: 28,548
- Rural population in 2007: 2,677

== Economy ==
The economy is based on agriculture and cattle raising, but Goiatuba has several large enterprises. The areas are diverse: poultry processing, automobile sales, dairy products, and agricultural equipment. There is an alcohol distillery—Goiasa (Goiatuba Álcool ltda.), a seed producer—Sementes Selecta, a bed clothing factory—Bouquet, a dairy—Laticínio Polenghi (which produces most of the ice cream sold by McDonald's in Brazil), and two fertilizer plants—Adubos Sul Goiano, Adubos Terra Verde.

=== Economic data ===
- Industrial units: 55 (06/2007)
- Retail units: 413 (08/2007)
- Banking institutions: Banco do Brasil S.A. - BRADESCO S.A. - Banco Itaú S.A. - CEF - Banco ABN AMRO Real S.A. - HSBC Bank Brasil S.A.-Banco Multiplo.. (01/06/2005)

== Industrial Dairies ==
- Polenghi Indústrias Alimentícias Ltda.;
- Goiatuba Álcool S/A(GOIASA);
- Bom Sucesso Agroindústria Ltda.;
- LogSeed Sementes Ltda.;
- Sementes Magnólia Ltda.;
- Agrex do Brasil S/A;
- Globoaves São Paulo Agroavícola Ltda.;
- São Salvador Alimentos S/A -;
- Frangoiano Indústria de Alimentos S/A -;
- AgroBom Armazéns Gerais Ltda.;
- Gaia Agribusiness Armazéns Gerais Ltda.
- AgroBom Armazéns Gerais Ltda.;
- Industrial Park: Distrito Agroindustrial - DIAGO;

=== Main agricultural activities ===
- Cattle raising: 98,100 head (2006)
- Poultry: 301,000
- Agriculture: rice, sugarcane (13,000 hectares), sorghum, soybeans (62,000 hectares), and corn (10,750 hectares). There is modest production of citrus fruits, bananas, manioc, beans, and tomatoes. Statistics are from IBGE
- Number of farms: 745
- Total area: 152,077
- Area of permanent crops: 991
- Area of perennial crops: 71,500
- Area of natural pasture: 56,773
- Persons dependent on farming: 2,500 IBGE

=== Education and health ===
- Literacy rate: 88.8%
- Infant mortality rate: 13.30 in 1,000 live births
- Schools: 24 (2006)
- Students: 9,253
- Higher education: Faculdade de Filosofia e Ciências Humanas de Goiatuba- FAFICH - Pólo Universitário da UEG.
- Hospitals: 03 (2006)
- Hospital beds: 139

(Sepin/IBGE)

=== Political information ===
Mayor: Reinaldo Cândido da Silva (January 2013) City council: 9

=== Prosperity ===
The municipality is one of the most prosperous in the state. Goiatuba got a score of 0.812 on the UN Human Development Index, putting it in 4th place out of 242 municipalities in the state. Nationally it was ranked 350 out of 5,507 municipalities. For the complete list see Frigoletto

== Origin of the name ==
Goiatuba became a city in 1931, and the origin of the name is curious: "Goia" comes from the Goia Indians and "Tuba" is a Tupi-Guarani word meaning "big". So, Goiatuba is the same as "big Goiás".

=== History ===
The settlement of the region took place in 1860 when ranchers from Minas Gerais settled to raise cattle and grow crops. In 1892 land was donated to establish a town. The first name was "Bananeiras" because of the abundance of this fruit in the region. With the building of the first chapel the town was called São Sebastião das Bananeiras. In 1900 it was elevated to a district and became a municipality in 1931.

== See also ==
- List of municipalities in Goiás
