= Itumbiara =

- Municipality
- Municipality of Itumbiara
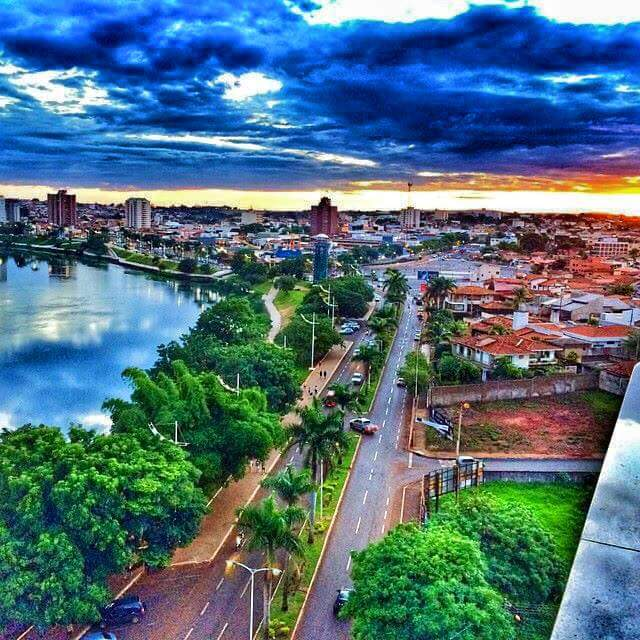
- View from Beira Rio.

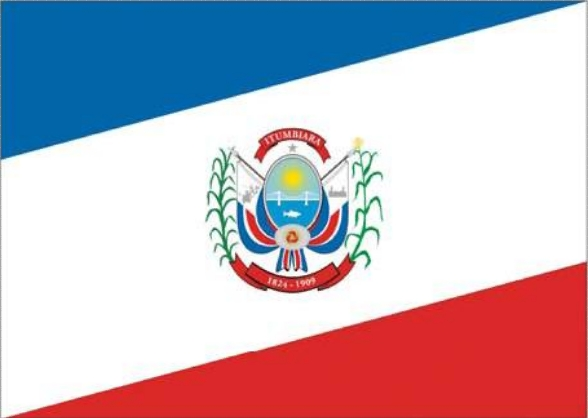
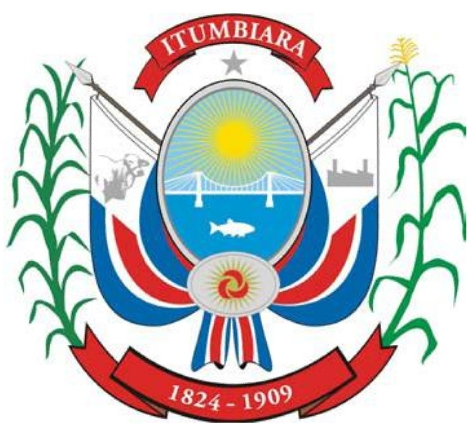
- Flag Coat of arms

- Location in the state of Goiás.
- Coordinates: 18°25′0″S 49°13′0″W
- Country: Brazil
- Region: Meia Ponte Microregion
- State: Goiás
- Founded: October 12, 1909

Government
  - Mayor: Dione José de Araújo (Brazil Union)

Area
  - Total: 2,461.28 km^{2} (950.31 sq mi)
- Elevation: 448 m (1,470 ft)

Population (2022 Census)
  - Total: 107,970
  - Estimate (2025): 113,322
  - Density: 43.867/km^{2} (113.62/sq mi)
- Demonym: Itumbiarense
- Time zone: UTC−3 (BRT)
- HDI (2010): 0,752 – high
- Website: City of Itumbiara

Itumbiara (Portuguese pronunciation: [itũw̃biˈaɾɐ]) is a municipality in Brazil, located in the southern part of the state of Goiás, on the border with Minas Gerais. It is a "sister city" to the Minas Gerais municipality of Araporã. The city lies south of the state capital, Goiânia, approximately 204 kilometers away, and 411 kilometers from the federal capital, Brasília. Covering an area of 2,447 square kilometres (945 sq mi), Itumbiara is the thirteenth most populous municipality in Goiás, with a population of 107,970 inhabitants according to the 2022 Census by the Brazilian Institute of Geography and Statistics (IBGE).

The history of Itumbiara dates back to the early 1820s, when a road was constructed across the Paranaíba River to connect Uberaba with central Goiás. The influx of settlers, drawn primarily by the road's construction, led to the establishment of a district named Santa Rita do Paranaíba in 1852. Following the Proclamation of the Republic, the municipality was officially established in 1909, still under the name Santa Rita do Paranaíba. The name "Itumbiara," derived from the Tupi language, was proposed by engineer Inácio Pais Leme, who oversaw the road's construction.

Itumbiara is regarded as the gateway to Goiás. It is also one of the state's largest exporters, owing to its proximity to Minas Gerais and São Paulo, which facilitates the distribution of agricultural products from southwestern Goiás to the South and Southeast regions. Key tourist attractions include the Paranaíba River, the Salitre Waterfall, the Beira Rio Lighthouse, and the Affonso Penna Bridge, which connects Goiás and Minas Gerais. Water sports are also popular in the city. The Ranking Connected Smart Cities, which identifies Brazil's most intelligent and high-potential cities, ranked Itumbiara as the 8th most intelligent and high-potential city in the Central-West Region and the 3rd in Goiás in 2021.

== Etymology ==
According to Navarro, the toponym originates from Tupi: ytu, meaning a waterfall, and piara, meaning a path. Both terms are in a genitive relationship, implying origin or possession, which allows for the inversion of terms (as indicated by the arrows). The transformation of 'p' to 'mb' occurs only when the preceding vowel is nasal. Thus, this change appears to be an error.

In the Tupi language, the toponym Itumbiara translates to "Path to the Waterfall," derived from the combination of ytu ("waterfall") and piara ("path to"). Inácio Pais Leme, an explorer of the region, named a tax post along the road he built connecting the village of Santa Rita do Paranaíba (now a district of the municipality) to Cachoeira Dourada.

== History ==
Around 1824, General Cunha Matos initiated the construction of a road linking the Goiás locality of Anhanguera to the Minas Gerais city of Uberaba. The beginning and end of the road required the crossing of the Paranaíba River, which forms the border between Goiás and Minas Gerais.

This crossing was established at a port, where the state government set up a revenue collection post. As an interstate crossing, the post aimed to regulate traffic at that point. The fertile lands in the region, ideal for agriculture and cattle raising, coupled with this development, led to the gradual formation of a small settlement. The residents of this nascent urban center built a chapel and dedicated it to Saint Rita. In homage to their patron saint, the settlement was named Porto de Santa Rita.

On August 21, 1852, provincial resolution No. 18 elevated the area to the status of a district named Santa Rita do Paranaíba. It was established as a municipality by State Law No. 349 on July 16, 1909, under Governor Urbano Coelho de Gouveia. The municipality was officially established on October 12, 1909, and was elevated to city status by State Law No. 518 on July 27, 1915, and to a comarca by Law No. 621 on July 29, 1918. Despite the abundance of water surrounding the city, electricity was not introduced until 1933.

Itumbiara was the scene of two revolutions in the 1930s. The first significant conflict was part of the Revolution of 1930, pitting forces loyal to President Washington Luís against supporters of the reformist ideas of future President Getúlio Vargas. Approximately one hundred Itumbiara residents participated in this episode. Washington Luís Avenue, located in the city center, marks the site of the conflict. The second violent confrontation in the city occurred during the 1932 Constitutionalist Revolution, between the Army and rebel forces from São Paulo. This revolutionary movement, primarily composed of lawyers, teachers, merchants, and university students, aimed to demand immediate general elections for the President of the Republic, Deputies, and Senators, and the drafting of a new Brazilian Constitution. Although President Getúlio Vargas suppressed the São Paulo revolutionaries, elections were held in 1933, and Brazil transitioned to a state of law with the promulgation of the 1934 Constitution. The Affonso Penna Bridge still bears bullet marks from this episode in Brazilian history.

Engineer Inácio Pais Leme, who built the "Itumbiara" road from Santa Rita do Paranaíba to Cachoeira Dourada, forty kilometers from the city, proposed naming the municipality after the road, which in Tupi means "Path to the Waterfall." The Goiás government approved this suggestion.

Itumbiara's first municipal administrator was Mr. Antônio Joaquim da Silva, appointed shortly after its emancipation. Other pioneering figures who held significant roles during the municipality's establishment included Major Rogério Prates Cotrim, the first municipal judge; José Olimpio Xavier de Barros, Public Prosecutor; Pedro Gomes de Oliveira, Notary Public; and Major Militão Pereira de Almeida, the first police chief. In the Legislative Branch, pioneers included Jacinto Brandão as President and Colonel Sidney Pereira de Almeida as secretary.

Itumbiara's strategic geographic location has made it one of the most developed cities in Brazil's Central-West Region. The municipality has grown steadily and become one of Goiás's leading exporters, alongside the capital, Goiânia, and other cities such as Anápolis and Rio Verde.

The municipality lost parts of its geographic area with the emancipation of the districts of Panamá in 1952, Cachoeira Dourada in 1982—a major tourist attraction at the time of its emancipation—and Inaciolândia in 1993. It has hosted visits from eight Brazilian Presidents: Afonso Pena, Juscelino Kubitschek, Emílio Garrastazu Médici, Ernesto Geisel, João Batista de Oliveira Figueiredo, Fernando Collor de Mello, Fernando Henrique Cardoso, and Luiz Inácio Lula da Silva.

== Geography ==
Itumbiara spans an area of 2,461 km², accounting for 0.7237% of Goiás's territory, 0.1538% of the Central-West Region, and 0.029% of Brazil's total surface area. The urbanized area of the municipality covers 19.3424 km², making it one of the largest urbanized areas among Goiás municipalities. The city is situated at an elevation ranging from 320 to 448 meters, depending on the location, with the highest points not exceeding 800 meters. Itumbiara borders the following municipalities: Goiatuba, Panamá, and Buriti Alegre to the north; the state of Minas Gerais to the south; Buriti Alegre to the east; and Bom Jesus de Goiás and Cachoeira Dourada to the west.

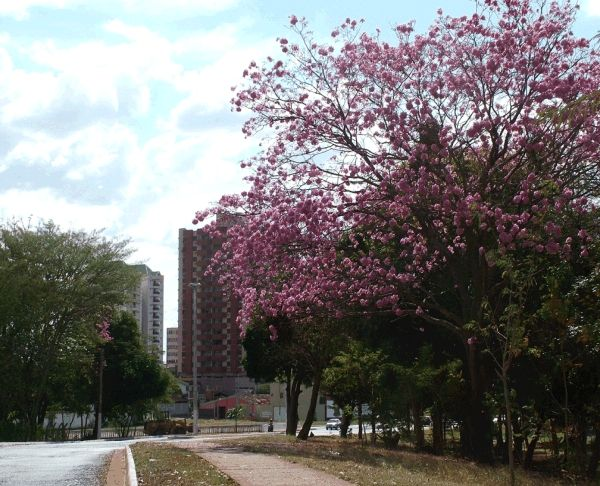
Vila de Furnas, one of the city's 58 neighborhoods

The municipality features predominantly mountainous terrain with undulating sections, though most of the landscape is flat, ideal for agriculture and pasture. The Santa Rita Range, along the Paranaíba River, extends its foothills inland, separating water masses. Besides this range, there are several hills, none of which are particularly prominent. The region's altitude varies from 320 to 448 meters.

The vegetation cover of Itumbiara is typically formed by fields and cerrado, with common species including angico, aroeira, grasses, courbaril, nance, pequi, and sea hibiscus.

Itumbiara has no administrative regions and is divided into 58 neighborhoods. Among the most populous are Afonso Pena, Novo Horizonte, Vila Vitória, Nossa Senhora da Saúde, and Cidade Jardim.

=== Hydrography ===
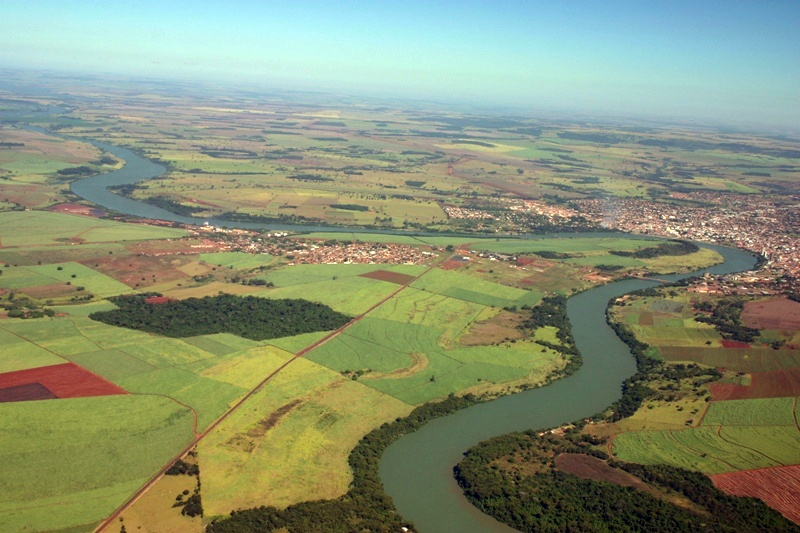
Paranaíba River, on the border between Itumbiara and the Minas Gerais municipality of Araporã.

Itumbiara is located within the Paraná River Basin, in the Paraná hydrographic region. The municipal seat is bathed by the Paranaíba River, Trindade Stream, and the Água Suja, Pombas, and Buriti creeks. The territory is also crossed by the Rio dos Bois and Meia Ponte River, along with notable streams such as Santa Maria, Campanha, Bom Sucesso, Boa Vereda, Medes, and Posses. Hundreds of smaller creeks are also present.

The Paranaíba River originates in Minas Gerais, in the Mata da Corda region, in the municipality of Rio Paranaíba, which shares the river's name. It is one of the tributaries forming the Paraná River, alongside the Rio Grande. The Rio dos Bois originates in the Congumé Range, in Americano do Brasil, and flows into the Paranaíba River. The Meia Ponte River has its source in the Brandões Range, in Itauçu.

Due to the significant energy potential of the Paranaíba River, large hydroelectric plants have been built in Itumbiara's territory, including the Itumbiara Hydroelectric Plant, the largest hydroelectric facility operated by Furnas Centrais Elétricas S.A., which forms an artificial lake.

=== Climate ===
Highest 24-hour precipitation accumulations recorded in Itumbiara by month (INMET)
Month	Accumulation	Date	Month	Accumulation	Date
January	100.5 millimetres (3.96 in)	16/01/1991	July	47.2 millimetres (1.86 in)	25/07/2014
February	91.9 millimetres (3.62 in)	08/02/2004	August	47.1 millimetres (1.85 in)	23/08/1993
March	122.2 millimetres (4.81 in)	16/03/2019	September	44.4 millimetres (1.75 in)	29/09/1991
April	80.4 millimetres (3.17 in)	10/04/2011	October	95.2 millimetres (3.75 in)	05/10/2016
May	64.6 millimetres (2.54 in)	07/05/1995	November	92.5 millimetres (3.64 in)	05/11/2009
June	49.6 millimetres (1.95 in)	06/06/1997	December	165.2 millimetres (6.50 in)	12/12/2005
Period: 10/06/1989–present

The climate of Itumbiara is tropical (type Aw according to the Köppen classification), with a wet season from October to April, characterized by moderately high temperatures, and a dry season from May to September, with milder temperatures. Autumn and spring serve as transitional seasons. Sudden temperature changes are common in the region. The most significant climatic variations occur from mid-August to January, when the weather becomes substantially hot, with apparent temperatures approaching or exceeding 40 °C (104 °F).

According to data from the National Institute of Meteorology (INMET), since June 1989, the lowest temperature recorded in Itumbiara was 1.9 °C (35.4 °F) on July 18, 2000, and the highest reached 42 °C (108 °F) on October 7, 2020. The highest 24-hour precipitation accumulation was 165.2 millimetres (6.50 in) on December 12, 2005. Accumulations of 100 millimetres (3.9 in) or more were also recorded on December 27, 1996 (122.5 millimetres (4.82 in)), March 16, 2019 (122.2 millimetres (4.81 in)), December 8, 2003 (113 millimetres (4.4 in)), and January 16, 1991 (100.5 millimetres (3.96 in)).

Climate data for Itumbiara (1981–2010 normals, extremes 1989–present)
Month	Jan	Feb	Mar	Apr	May	Jun	Jul	Aug	Sep	Oct	Nov	Dec	Year
Record high °C (°F)	37.8 (100.0)	37.7 (99.9)	35.8 (96.4)	35.2 (95.4)	34.7 (94.5)	36.3 (97.3)	36.0 (96.8)	38.2 (100.8)	41.5 (106.7)	42.0 (107.6)	38.3 (100.9)	38.3 (100.9)	42.0 (107.6)
Mean daily maximum °C (°F)	31.1 (88.0)	31.7 (89.1)	31.2 (88.2)	31.0 (87.8)	29.3 (84.7)	28.9 (84.0)	29.9 (85.8)	31.9 (89.4)	33.8 (92.8)	33.6 (92.5)	32.3 (90.1)	31.3 (88.3)	31.3 (88.3)
Daily mean °C (°F)	25.2 (77.4)	25.3 (77.5)	25.0 (77.0)	24.3 (75.7)	21.8 (71.2)	20.8 (69.4)	21.2 (70.2)	23.2 (73.8)	25.6 (78.1)	26.4 (79.5)	25.7 (78.3)	25.4 (77.7)	24.2 (75.6)
Mean daily minimum °C (°F)	21.2 (70.2)	20.9 (69.6)	20.7 (69.3)	18.9 (66.0)	15.5 (59.9)	14.1 (57.4)	13.7 (56.7)	15.7 (60.3)	19.1 (66.4)	20.4 (68.7)	20.9 (69.6)	21.3 (70.3)	18.5 (65.3)
Record low °C (°F)	16.9 (62.4)	16.7 (62.1)	14.1 (57.4)	8.6 (47.5)	4.8 (40.6)	4.4 (39.9)	1.9 (35.4)	5.4 (41.7)	8.4 (47.1)	11.6 (52.9)	13.4 (56.1)	14.6 (58.3)	1.9 (35.4)
Average precipitation mm (inches)	267.8 (10.54)	201.1 (7.92)	179.1 (7.05)	71.9 (2.83)	30.4 (1.20)	12.7 (0.50)	4.6 (0.18)	7.2 (0.28)	50.3 (1.98)	84.8 (3.34)	193.1 (7.60)	255.3 (10.05)	1,358.3 (53.48)
Average precipitation days	16	13	13	5	3	1	1	1	4	8	12	16	93
Average relative humidity (%)	78.2	77.0	77.2	72.7	69.3	64.9	57.4	49.0	52.0	59.4	69.7	75.8	66.9
Mean monthly sunshine hours	162.5	174.7	200.5	237.1	246.7	253.0	273.7	284.7	224.7	212.9	182.2	167.2	2,619.9
Source: INMET

== Demography ==
According to the 2022 census by the Brazilian Institute of Geography and Statistics (IBGE), Itumbiara's population was 107,970 inhabitants, making it the 12th most populous municipality in Goiás, with a population density of 44.1 inhabitants per km^{2}. The 2010 census reported that 50.7% of the population were women (47,117 inhabitants), 49.3% were men (45,825 inhabitants), 95.8% (89,000 inhabitants) lived in the urban area, and 4.2% (3,942 inhabitants) resided in the rural area.

Itumbiara's population grew by 14.14% over the last decade. Between 1991 and 2000, the municipality recorded an average annual population growth rate of 2.97%, increasing from 81,143 inhabitants in 1991 to 86,695 in 2000. However, the urbanization rate grew by only 2.66%, rising from 63% in 1991 to 64.67% in 2000. In 2000, the municipality's population accounted for 1.82% of Goiás's population and 0.04% of Brazil's population.

=== Ethnic composition ===
The cultural, political, and economic influences inherited from the Portuguese are prominent and defining in Itumbiara. However, looking further back in history, the contributions of Indigenous peoples to the ethnic composition cannot be overlooked. Indigenous groups were the first to inhabit Brazil.

Itumbiara's demographic history reflects the intermingling of the three primary ethnic groups that form the Brazilian population: Indigenous, European, and African, resulting in the region's mestiço population. Later, with the arrival of immigrants, a unique cultural blend emerged, characterizing both the city and the state, along with their values and way of life. There is a notable community of Japanese Brazilians, stemming from Japanese immigration in the 1930s, primarily farmers. Additionally, Itumbiara stands out nationally not only for attracting migrants but also for sending emigrants abroad, particularly to North America. It ranks among Brazilian cities with the highest number of natives living overseas, alongside Governador Valadares (MG) and Piracanjuba (GO).

According to the 2000 census by the IBGE, Itumbiara's population comprises: Whites (65.35% or 53,211 inhabitants), Pardos (28.49% or 23,197 inhabitants), Blacks (5.37% or 4,377 inhabitants), Indigenous (0.29% or 233 inhabitants), and Asians (0.26% or 209 inhabitants). Additionally, 203 individuals did not declare their ethnicity, representing 0.25% of the total population.

=== Religion ===
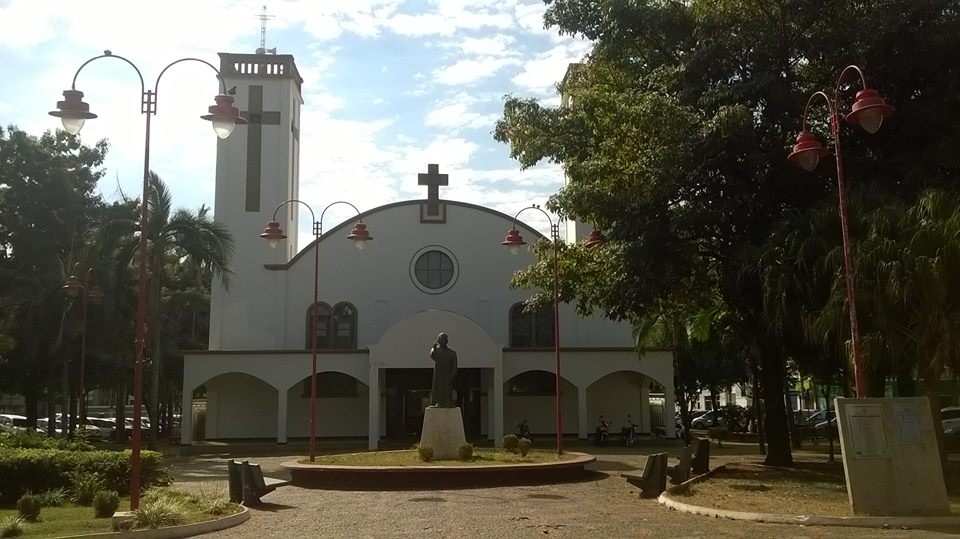
Santa Rita de Cássia Church.

Reflecting Itumbiara's cultural diversity, the city hosts a variety of religious practices. Although it developed within a predominantly Catholic social framework due to colonization and immigration, today the city is home to numerous Protestant denominations, as well as practices such as Candomblé, Eastern religions, Christian restorationist faiths, Spiritism, and others. In recent years, Protestant denominations and Spiritism have seen significant growth in the city.

According to 2000 data from the IBGE, Itumbiara's population is composed of: Catholics (44.74%); Evangelicals (39.25%); people without religion (7.56%); Spiritists (7.55%); and Eastern religions (0.10%). Among Protestant churches, notable ones include the Assembleia de Deus (2.69%), Universal Church of the Kingdom of God (0.86%), and Presbyterian Church (0.44%). Among Christian restorationist denominations, The Church of Jesus Christ of Latter-day Saints (0.34%) and Jehovah's Witnesses (0.03%) stand out. Umbanda and Candomblé together account for 0.15% of the religious population. Esoteric traditions are practiced by 0.11% of the population, and 0.04% did not declare any religion.

== Politics ==
The executive branch of Itumbiara's municipal government is led by the mayor, supported by a cabinet of secretaries and equivalent directors, elected through direct voting for a four-year term, with the possibility of re-election for a second consecutive term. The current head of the municipal executive is Francisco Domingues de Faria, affiliated with the Brazilian Labor Party (PTB), elected in the 2012 municipal elections with 59.32 of valid votes.

The legislative branch is exercised by the municipal chamber, composed of thirteen councilors elected for four-year terms. In the current legislature, which began in 2013, the chamber consists of three seats from the Brazilian Labor Party (PTB), two from the Brazilian Democratic Movement Party (PMDB), one from the Workers' Party (PT), one from the Brazilian Social Democracy Party (PSDB), one from the Social Democratic Party (PSD), one from the Social Christian Party (PSC), one from the Liberal Party (PR), one from the Communist Party of Brazil (PCdoB), one from the Popular Socialist Party (PPS), and one from the Democrats (DEM). The chamber is responsible for drafting and voting on fundamental laws for the administration and the executive, particularly the participatory budget (Budget Guidelines Law).

Itumbiara is the seat of a third-tier comarca with four courts: two civil, one criminal, and one special court. According to the Superior Electoral Court (TSE), as of December 2013, the municipality had 70,687 voters, representing 1.634 of Goiás's total. The first political party in Itumbiara was the Democrata Santaritense, founded by Major Militão Pereira de Almeida and Colonel Sidney Pereira de Almeida.

Regarding political representation, 32 of Brazil's 35 political parties are represented in the municipality. According to data from the Superior Electoral Court (TSE) as of April 2016, the political party with the most members in Itumbiara is the Brazilian Democratic Movement Party (PMDB), with 1,714 members, followed by the Progressive Party (PP) with 1,671 members, and the Brazilian Social Democracy Party (PSDB) with 1,396 members. Rounding out the top five parties by membership are the Workers' Party (PT) with 1,094 members and the Brazilian Socialist Party (PSB) with 459 members. The Free Fatherland Party (PPL) and the Brazilian Communist Party (PCB) have the least representation, with one member each. Three parties have no representation in Itumbiara: Workers' Cause Party (PCO), New Party (NOVO), and the Brazilian Woman's Party (PMB).

== Economy ==
Itumbiara's gross domestic product (GDP) is the seventh largest in Goiás. It excels particularly in the service sector. According to 2018 data from the Brazilian Institute of Geography and Statistics (IBGE), the municipality's GDP was R$ 4,187,512.28, with a per capita GDP of R$ 49,832.28, placing it 16th among municipalities in the Central-West and 261st among Brazilian municipalities in terms of GDP.

Of the city's total GDP, R$ 245,834 comes from the gross value added by agriculture (primary sector), R$ 911,098 from industry (secondary sector), R$ 406,492 from taxes on products net of subsidies, and R$ 1,511,568 from service provision (tertiary sector). The service sector is currently the primary contributor to Itumbiara's GDP.

Itumbiara is also one of Goiás's most competitive municipalities. Its easy access to the South and Southeast of Brazil facilitates product distribution. This is a key factor in the production, expansion, and establishment of new agro-industries in the Diagri – Itumbiara Agroindustrial District, fostering local economic growth and development. Itumbiara is Goiás's largest exporter.

=== Primary sector ===
Agriculture

Located in the fertile valley of the Paranaíba River, Itumbiara relies on agriculture as a primary source of income. Although it remains a significant part of the local economy, agriculture is gradually losing ground to industry.

According to the 1996 Agricultural Census, Itumbiara's cultivated area included 50,489 hectares of temporary crops, 720 hectares of permanent crops, 17,085 hectares of natural pastures, 106,946 hectares of artificial (planted) pastures, 20,222 hectares of natural and artificial forests, and 2,132 hectares of irrigated crops. The total area is 246,460 hectares, of which 202,610 are suitable for agriculture and pasture formation. In 1996, the municipality had 1,240 rural properties, 981 tractors, 755 mechanically powered plows, 19 animal-drawn plows, 141 harvesters, and 3,645 planting machines.

Itumbiara has 39 dry storage and warehousing facilities, sufficient to handle the municipality's production and that of neighboring municipalities. In 1997, it had a storage capacity of 573,500 tons or 9,550,000 60-kilogram sacks, distributed as follows: 346,141 m^{3} of conventional warehouses (equivalent to 186,920 tons), 193,240 tons in bulk warehouses, and 193,340 tons in silo warehouses.

In 2006, the agricultural sector generated 4,441 direct jobs, with 3,548 positions filled by men and 893 by women. Of these, 4,142 jobs were held by individuals over 14 years old.

Livestock

According to the 1996 Agricultural Census, Itumbiara had a bovine herd density of 66.09 heads per km^{2}, with a total of 162,896 cattle. By 2006, the number of cattle had decreased to 120,792, alongside 2,271 horses, 50 buffalo, and 16 donkeys.

Other notable animals in 1996 included 46 buffalo, 5,886 pigs, 756 sheep, 2,013 goats, and 95,580 poultry (chickens, hens, roosters), producing 140,438 dozen eggs annually. Other birds (ducks, geese, turkeys) totaled 10,235 units.

=== Secondary sector ===
Itumbiara is a significant industrial hub at the state level. Industry plays a major role in the local economy and has been expanding in recent years. It is particularly noted for products derived from maize, soybean, cotton, and milk. However, the primary industrial economic drivers are metallurgy, footwear, textiles, mechanics, and food processing.

The municipality has an industrial district along the BR-452, with access to the BR-153, which connects Goiás, Minas Gerais, São Paulo, and Brasília. The industrial district has stable infrastructure, including electricity, water, sewage, telephone, and asphalt. Covering approximately 1,100,000, it is divided into blocks and streets and is located 8 kilometers from the city center. Industries benefit from the FOMENTAR program, which finances up to 70% of ICMS for 15 years at 2.6% annual interest, along with municipal incentives such as land cleanup assistance. Currently, 167 industries operate in the district.

Itumbiara hosts several national exporting companies, including Caramuru Alimentos (soybean exporter), Louis Dreyfus Commodities (cotton derivative exporter), JBS (leather exporter), and Stemac (energy generator manufacturer).

=== Tertiary sector ===
Itumbiara is a commercial distribution hub, standing out in the Meia Ponte Microregion. All 18 neighboring municipalities rely on Itumbiara's commerce, which accounts for approximately 36% of the ICMS revenue. Companies such as Peugeot, Renault, Ford, Volkswagen, FIAT, Toyota, Hyundai, Nissan, Chery, Mitsubishi, Chevrolet, and Jeep serve the entire region. The city also hosts retail chains such as Lojas Americanas, Ricardo Eletro, Magazine Luiza, Casas Bahia, Pernambucanas, Drogasil, Pague Menos, and the Bretas supermarket chain.

According to the Itumbiara Tax Office in 1997, the municipality had 1,098 active commercial establishments, 1,322 suspended commercial establishments, 542 service providers, 45 road transport companies for cargo and passengers, 36 dry storage and warehousing facilities for grains, 9 banking institutions, and 12 hotels with over 530 beds. In 2018, it hosts one of the largest beverage companies, the Polish multinational CanPack, which operates 11 plants worldwide. Its Itumbiara facility produces over 3 million aluminum cans daily.

== Infrastructure ==
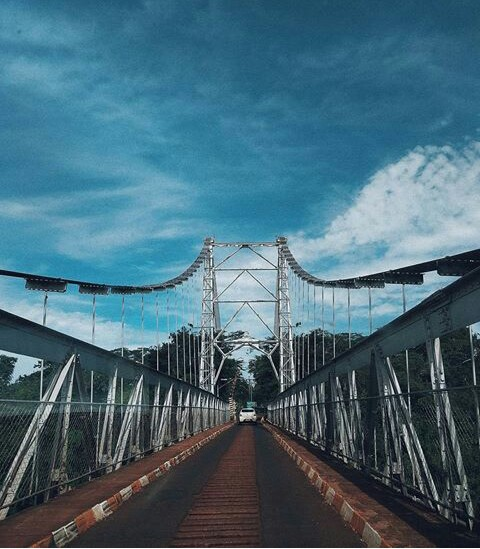
Affonso Penna Bridge.

In 2000, Itumbiara had 24,216 households, including apartments, houses, and rooms. Of these, 15,245 were owned properties, with 13,841 fully paid (57.16%), 1,404 under acquisition (5.80%), and 5,487 rented (22.66%). Additionally, 3,407 properties were provided, with 1,123 supplied by employers (4.64%), 2,284 provided otherwise (9.43%), and 77 in other forms (0.32%).

The water supply is managed by the state-owned Companhia Saneamento de Goiás S/A (SANEAGO), which oversees sanitation in 223 Goiás municipalities. In the districts, water is distributed via artesian wells, while the municipal seat relies primarily on a water treatment plant.

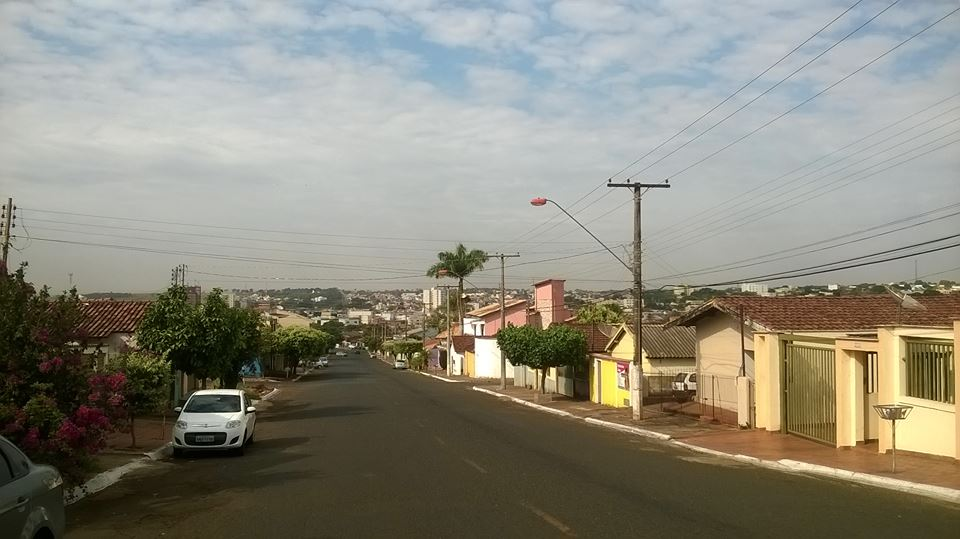
Avenida Goiatuba.

Under the 1988 Brazilian Constitution, Itumbiara's Municipal Guard, alongside the Goiás Military Police, is tasked with protecting public assets, services, and facilities. In the public interest and exercising its police powers, it works to prevent and suppress certain crimes, particularly against public property and services, and can arrest offenders in flagrante delicto and present them to a police chief, as stipulated by criminal procedure law.

=== Healthcare ===
Itumbiara has 51 healthcare facilities, including 27 private and 24 public municipal facilities, such as hospitals, emergency departments, health centers, and dentistry services. The city has 232 beds for hospitalization. There are three general hospitals, two public and one private. The city employs 52 surgical doctors, 108 clinical doctors, 54 obstetricians, and 54 pediatricians, totaling 268. In 2008, 1,318 live births were recorded, with 7.4% premature, 47.6% via cesarean section, and 25.1% to mothers aged 10 to 19 (0.5% aged 10 to 14). The crude birth rate is 14.14.

=== Education ===
Itumbiara has schools in all regions of the municipality. In 2009, the municipality recorded approximately 13,708 enrollments in primary education, 4,000 in secondary education, and 2,146 in early childhood education. Of the municipality's educational institutions, 48.9% were for primary education, 34.1% for early childhood education, and 17% for secondary education. In terms of teachers, 64.8% were in primary education, 25% in secondary education and 10.2% in early childhood education.

For higher education, Itumbiara hosts a campus of the Goiás State University (UEG) and the Federal Institute of Goiás, the only two public higher education institutions. Private higher education institutions include the Lutheran Institute of Higher Education of Itumbiara, part of the Lutheran University of Brazil (ULBRA), Santa Rita de Cássia Faculty (UNIFASC), North Paraná University (UNOPAR), and Uniasselvi.

The municipality also has units of the SENAI, SENAC, and SESI, contributing to some of the highest literacy and professional training rates in Goiás. In 2013, Itumbiara scored 6.4 on the Basic Education Development Index (IDEB) for the initial years of primary education. For the final years of primary education, the score was 5.2, surpassing the previous score but falling below the state average.

=== Services and communications ===
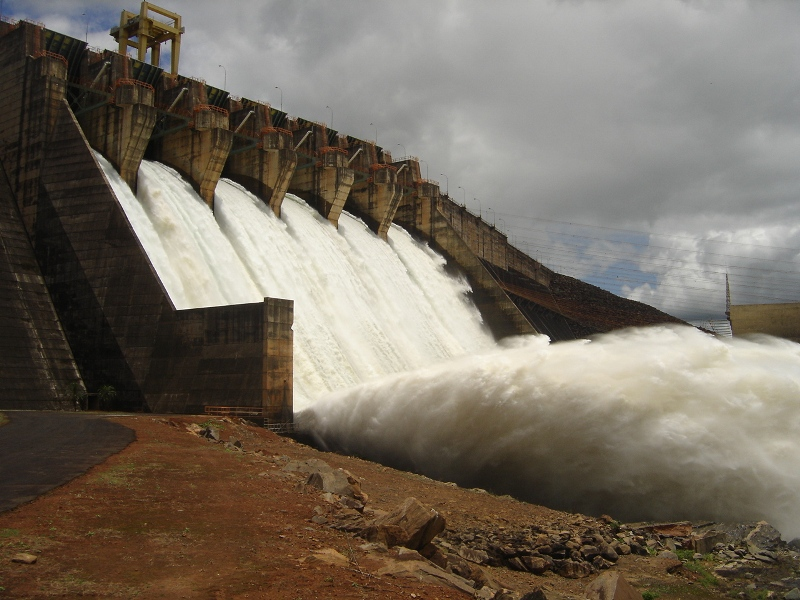
Itumbiara Dam.

The municipality is powered by the Itumbiara Hydroelectric Plant (UHI), operational since 1981, located on the Paranaíba River between Itumbiara and Araporã. It supplies much of Goiás, Minas Gerais, and parts of Mato Grosso do Sul. With six operational units and a total installed capacity of 2,082 MW, it is the largest plant in the Brazilian Furnas System. Construction began in November 1974.

Itumbiara's first newspaper, owned by José Flávio Soares in 1919, was titled O Comércio. The city receives free-to-air television signals from various Brazilian broadcasters. Regional broadcasters airing local programs include Rede Anhanguera, which broadcasts TV Anhanguera, affiliated with Rede Globo; RedeTV! Itumbiara, affiliated with RedeTV!; TV Serra Dourada, affiliated with SBT; TV Record Goiás, affiliated with Rede Record; and TV Brasil Central, affiliated with TV Cultura.

== Transportation ==
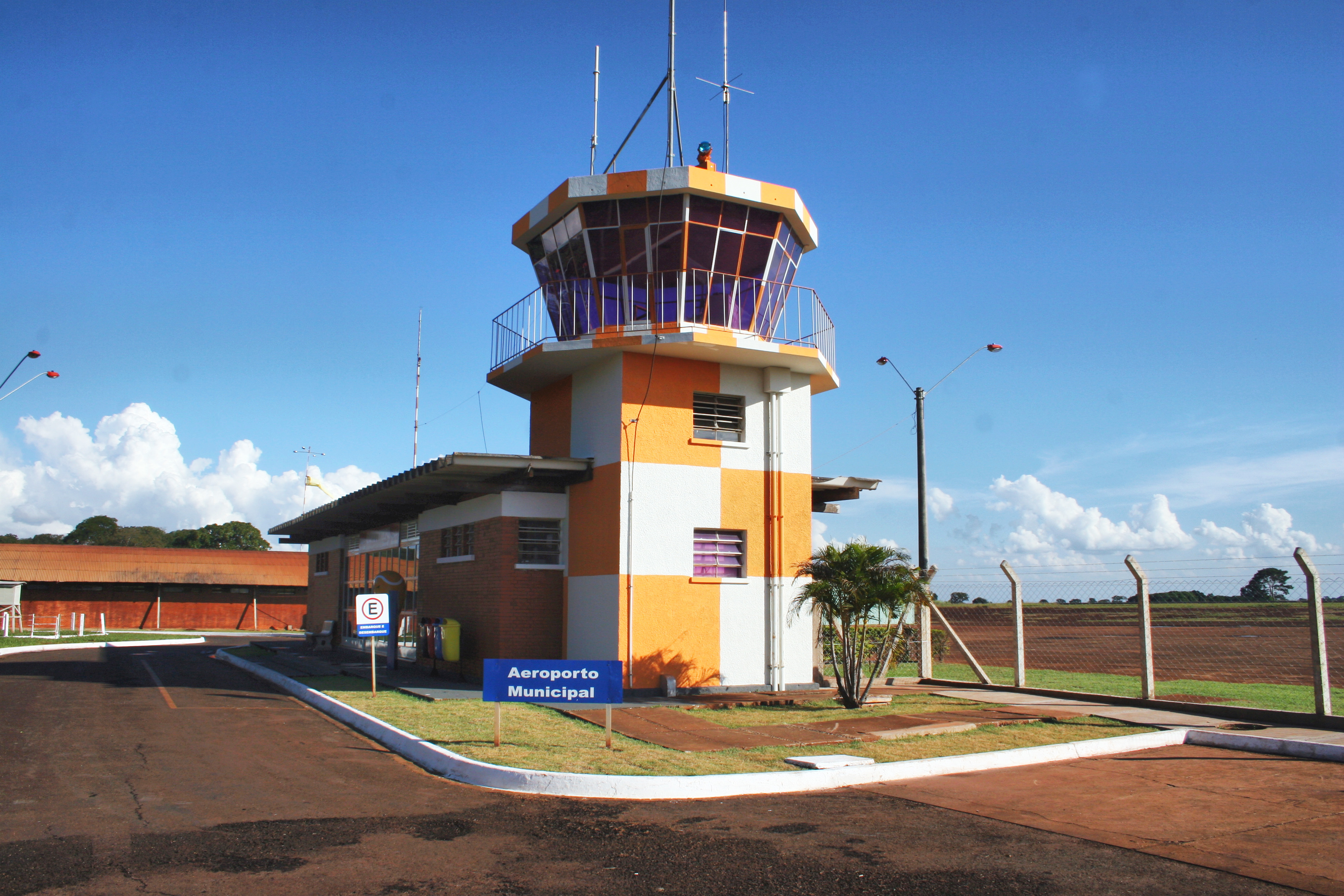
Itumbiara Airport.

The municipality has a strong tradition in road transportation. Located along one of Brazil's busiest corridors, Itumbiara is served by highways and roads that connect it to major urban centers such as Goiânia, Brasília, Uberlândia, and São Paulo. The distance between the municipal seat and the state capital, Goiânia, is approximately 206 kilometers. The distance to the federal capital, Brasília, is 404 kilometers.

The three main highways in Itumbiara are BR-153, also known as the Transbrasiliana Highway, which provides access to the capitals Goiânia and Brasília; BR-452, which connects the city to Rio Verde; and GO-419, which links to Buriti Alegre.

Itumbiara has limited tradition in river transportation, largely due to the absence of navigable rivers within its territory. However, the Paranaíba River is extensively used for river transport, particularly for ecotourism activities. The Itumbiara Airport—officially named Itumbiara-Francisco Vilela do Amaral Airport (ICAO: SBIT)—is operated by the municipal government. It has an asphalt runway of 2,700 meters, suitable for both day and night flights, and can accommodate large aircraft.

== Culture and society ==
=== Tourism ===
Ecotourism is the primary driver of tourism in Itumbiara, serving as a key pathway for the city's development. This is characterized by the competitive advantages of the region in this sector, with a particular emphasis on the large lake of the Itumbiara Dam, which has a depth of 521.20 meters, a flooded area of 778 km^{2}, and a total volume of 17 billion m^{3}. This is equivalent to two Guanabara Bays.

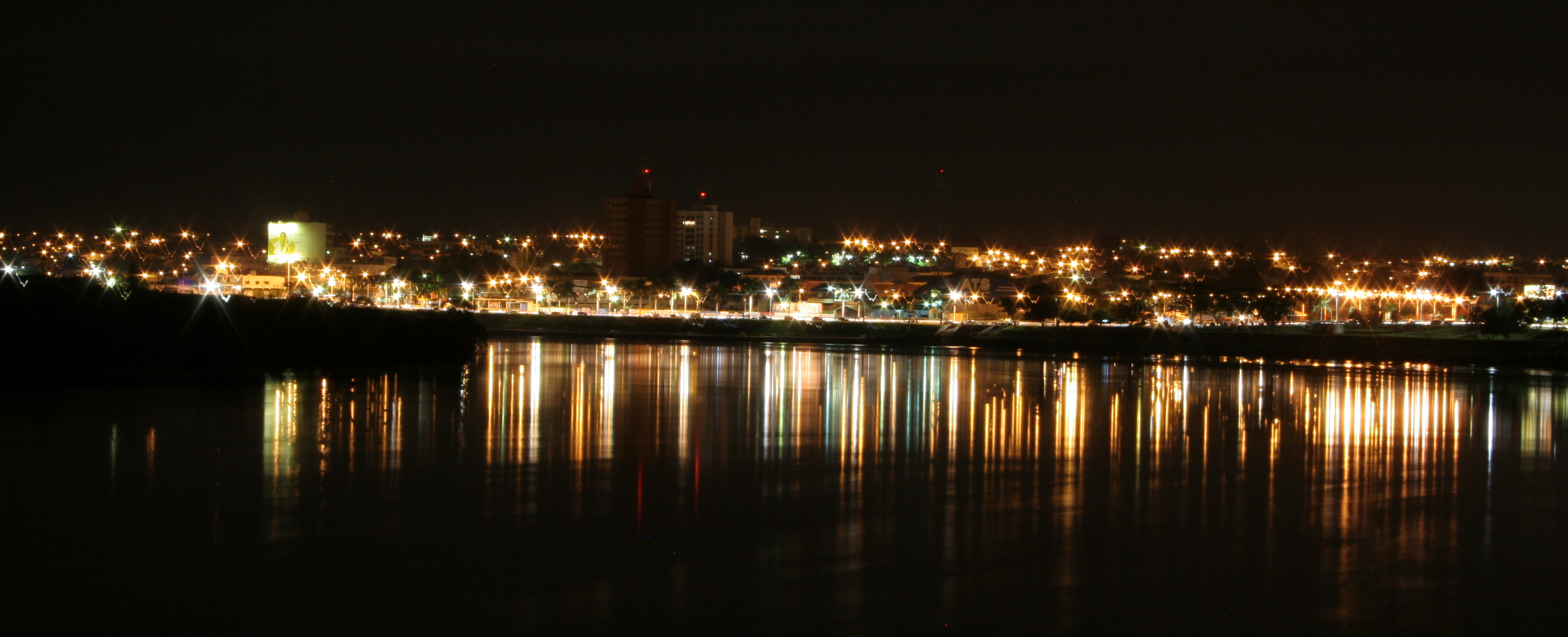
Night view of Itumbiara, seen from the Minas Gerais municipality of Araporã.

In recent years, the lake area of the Paranaíba River Dam has become a popular venue for gatherings of fishermen and fishing teams engaging in sport fishing, a phenomenon highlighted in specialized magazines that rank Itumbiara as the second-best location in Brazil for sport fishing of peacock bass. The Paranaíba River also hosts various water sports.

The Dr. Henrique Santillo International Kartodrome, located in the west-central part of the city, hosts regional, national, and international events. It has a capacity for 5,000 people.

Among the municipality's main natural tourist attractions are the Paranaíba River, which acts as a vast mirror reflecting the well-constructed buildings along its banks on one side and the state of Minas Gerais on the other; and the Salitre Waterfall, located in the rural area near the border with Buriti Alegre, offering trails and climbing opportunities.

Historical tourist attractions include the Main Square (Praça Matriz), established by municipal decree No. 538 in April 1934, authored by Sidney Pereira de Almeida. At the time of its construction, it was the city's first public garden. The project was executed by engineer Eduardo Figueiredo Mendes and opened to the public on June 23, 1935. It is now called Republic Square (Praça da República); the Affonso Penna suspension bridge, built to meet the significant need for development in the southwest of Goiás and to improve connections with major centers such as São Paulo and Rio de Janeiro; and the Cyro Gomes de Almeida Bridge, constructed over the Paranaíba River in 1958 to replace the old Affonso Penna Bridge, during the period when Brazil's capital was transferred from Rio de Janeiro to Brasília in 1960. The bridge is named in honor of its builder, Cyro Gomes de Almeida.

=== Arts ===
Several theater groups operate in the municipality. In 1919, the first theater group was established in Itumbiara, making it one of the pioneers in this field in southern Goiás. It was founded and conceptualized by José Flávio Soares, a journalist from the region. That same year, the first theatrical play in the municipality, also authored by José Flávio Soares, was performed.

The first cinema in Itumbiara, named Cine Brasil, was owned by Sidney Pereira de Almeida. The movie "The Ace of the West", a cowboy movie, was shown there. It was the first movie shown in the city.

=== Events ===
Itumbiara hosts numerous events annually, some of which are well known among the local population. The city is home to significant religious and cultural events. Notable among them are the feast of Saint Sebastian, held on January 20; the feast of Saint Rita of Cascia, in May; and the Christ the King Fair, held between May 1 and May 10. The fluvial procession of Our Lady of Grace, held in August, has been celebrated for over 50 years. The city's agricultural fair, held in September, is another cultural highlight. Additional events include the Ecological Week in June, the South Goiás Industry and Commerce Fair (Expossul), hosted in the city, and the municipality's anniversary, celebrated on October 12.

=== Football ===
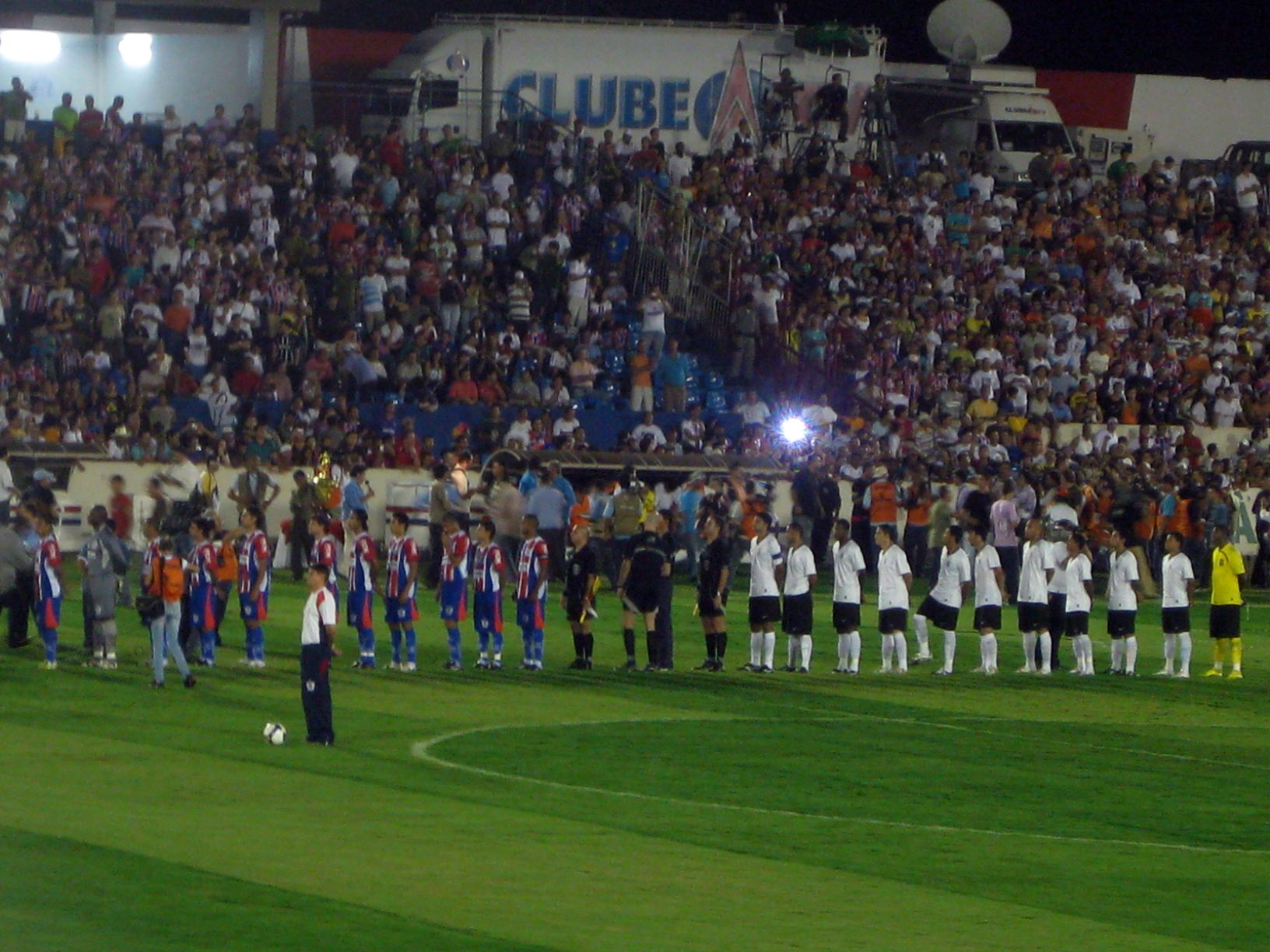
Itumbiara Esporte Clube against Corinthians in the 2009 Copa do Brasil.

In football, the most important club in Itumbiara is Itumbiara Esporte Clube, founded on March 9, 1970. Its headquarters are located on Goiânia Street in the Historic Center of Itumbiara. The club won its first state title in 2003, becoming the Goiás Second Division Champion. Since 2004, it has competed in the First Division of the Goiás Football Championship. In 1979, it played its first official match in the Campeonato Brasileiro, finishing in 64th place. The club also participated in the Taça de Prata in 1980, 1983, and 1984; the Taça de Bronze in 1981; and the Third Division in 1987, 1994, 1995, 1997, and 1998. It won the Goiás Football Championship in 2008, earning the right to compete in the 2009 Copa do Brasil, where it faced Corinthians.

The football club plays its matches at the Juscelino Kubitschek Municipal Stadium, located in the Planalto neighborhood. The stadium has a capacity of 33,000 people. It was inaugurated on October 10, 1976, against Club de Regatas Vasco da Gama. Its record attendance was in 2008, when Itumbiara faced Goiás Esporte Clube, witnessed by 31,000 spectators.

== Sister cities ==
- Brazil – Rio Verde
- Brazil – Quirinópolis

== Notable people ==
- Dante do Amaral, volleyball player
- Zé Roberto, football player
- Jorge e Mateus, Sertanejo singers
- Ricardo Boiadeiro, football player

== See also ==
- List of municipalities in Goiás
