= Itumbiara Esporte Clube =

Brazilian football club

Itumbiara
- Full name: Itumbiara Esporte Clube
- Nicknames: Gigante do vale (Giant of the Valley); Tricolor da Fronteira (Three Color of the Frontier)
- Founded: March 9, 1970; 56 years ago
- Ground: Estádio JK
- Capacity: 14,445
- President: Raul Jota dos Santos
- Head coach: Vitor Hugo Siqueira
- League: Campeonato Goiano
- 2021: 12th of 12 (relegated)
Home colours	Away colours

Itumbiara Esporte Clube, usually known simply as Itumbiara, is a Brazilian football club from Itumbiara, Goiás state. The club competed in the Campeonato Brasileiro Série A in 1979 and won the state championship in 2008.

== History ==
On March 9, 1970, Itumbiara Esporte Clube was founded, as a result of the merger of local teams Goiás (founded in 1964) and Nacional (founded in 1952).

In 1979, Itumbiara competed in the top level of the Brazilian Championship, finishing in the 64th position.

In 2008, Itumbiara won the state championship for the first time, after beating Goiás 1–0 and 3–0 in the final.

In 2010, Itumbiara finished state championship on 9th and penultimate place and were relegated to second level. Due to this performance they were qualified to 2011 Campeonato Brasileiro Série D because all 2011 Campeonato Goiano teams withdrew.

== Honours ==
- Campeonato Goiano
  - Winners (1): 2008
- Campeonato Goiano do Interior
  - Winners (1): 2007

== Stadium ==
Itumbiara's stadium is Estádio JK, inaugurated in 1977, with a maximum capacity of 20,000 people.
