= 2014 Clube Náutico Capibaribe season =

Náutico
2014 season
- Chairman: Glauber Vasconcelos
- Manager: Lisca; Sérgio China (c); Sidney Moraes; Dado Cavalcanti
- Stadium: Arena Pernambuco
- Série B: 13th
- Pernambucano: Runners up
- Copa do Brasil: Second round
- Copa do Nordeste: Group stage
- Top goalscorer: League: Sassá (9); All: Sassá (9)
Home colours	Away colours	Third colours

The 2014 season was Náutico's 114th season in the club's history. Náutico competed in the Campeonato Pernambucano, Copa do Nordeste, Copa do Brasil and Série B.

== Squad ==
Note: Flags indicate national team as defined under FIFA eligibility rules; some limited exceptions apply. Players may hold more than one non-FIFA nationality.

No.	Pos.	Nation	Player
1	GK	BRA	Alessandro
4	DF	BRA	William Alves
6	DF	BRA	Renato Chaves
7	MF	BRA	Marinho
8	MF	BRA	Marcone
10	MF	BRA	Vina
11	FW	BRA	Lelêu
13	DF	BRA	João Ananias
15	MF	ARG	Marcelo Cañete
17	MF	BRA	Marcos Vinícius
19	MF	BRA	Diego Galo
23	MF	BRA	Pedro Carmona
28	DF	BRA	Diego Silva
29	FW	BRA	Renato Henrique

No.	Pos.	Nation	Player
31	FW	BRA	Bruno Furlan
36	DF	BRA	Luiz Alberto
37	MF	BRA	Gustavo Henrique
45	MF	BRA	Wangler
47	MF	BRA	Hélder
77	DF	BRA	Flávio Ramos
50	MF	BRA	Vitor Michels
80	GK	BRA	Jefferson
84	GK	BRA	Júlio César
85	MF	BRA	Elicarlos
86	DF	BRA	Rai
88	DF	BRA	Neílson
93	MF	BRA	Luizinho Mello
—	FW	BRA	Rogério

== Statistics ==
=== Overall ===
Games played	62 (6 Copa do Nordeste, 14 Pernambucano, 4 Copa do Brasil, 38 Série B)
Games won	24 (1 Copa do Nordeste, 7 Pernambucano, 2 Copa do Brasil, 14 Série B)
Games drawn	13 (3 Copa do Nordeste, 2 Pernambucano, 0 Copa do Brasil, 8 Série B)
Games lost	25 (2 Copa do Nordeste, 5 Pernambucano, 2 Copa do Brasil, 16 Série B)
Goals scored	67
Goals conceded	75
Goal difference	–8
Best results (goal difference)	4–1 (A) v Porto - Pernambucano - 2014.03.08
Worst result (goal difference)	1–4 (H) v América–MG - Série B - 2014.10.07
Top scorer	Sassá (9)

Source: Náutico official website

=== Goalscorers ===
Place	Position	Nationality	Number	Name	Copa do Nordeste	Campeonato Pernambucano	Copa do Brasil	Série B	Total
1	FW	(Brazil)	99	Sassá	0	0	0	9	9
2	MF	(Brazil)	16	Pedro Carmona	0	6	0	0	6
2	MF	(Brazil)	10	Vina	0	1	0	5	6
3	FW	(Brazil)	20	Crislan	0	0	0	4	4
3	FW	(Brazil)	9	Tadeu	0	0	0	4	4
4	MF	(Brazil)	85	Elicarlos	0	2	0	1	3
4	FW	(Brazil)	21	Hugo Almeida	1	1	0	1	3
4	MF	(Brazil)	10	Marcos Vinícius	1	2	0	0	3
4	MF	(Brazil)	25	Paulinho	0	0	0	3	3
4	DF	(Brazil)	4	William Alves	0	1	0	2	3
5	FW	(Brazil)	31	Bruno Furlan	0	0	0	2	2
5	FW	(Brazil)	9	Careca	0	0	0	2	2
5	DF	(Brazil)	13	Flávio Ramos	0	0	2	0	2
5	FW	(Brazil)	21	Hugo Cabral	0	2	0	0	2
5	FW	(Brazil)	20	Marcelinho	0	1	1	0	2
5	FW	(Brazil)	7	Marinho	0	1	0	1	2
6	DF	(Brazil)	14	Hélder Maurílio	0	1	0	0	1
6	DF	(Brazil)	2	Jackson	0	1	0	0	1
6	MF	(Brazil)	11	Lelêu	0	0	0	1	1
6	MF	(Argentina)	15	Marcelo Cañete	0	0	0	1	1
6	DF	(Uruguay)	34	Mario Risso	0	0	0	1	1
6	DF	(Brazil)	86	Raí	0	0	0	1	1
6	DF	(Brazil)	6	Renato Chaves	0	0	0	1	1
6	FW	(Brazil)	9	Renato Henrique	1	0	0	0	1
6	DF	(Brazil)	90	Roberto	0	0	0	1	1
6	DF	(Brazil)	6	Zé Mário	1	0	0	0	1
				Own goals	0	1	0	0	1
				Total	4	20	3	40	67

=== Home record ===
São Lourenço da Mata	Recife
Arena Pernambuco	Estádio dos Aflitos
Capacity: 44,300	Capacity: 19,800
30 matches (16 wins 4 draws 10 losses)	1 match (1 loss)

== Official Competitions ==
=== Copa do Nordeste ===
==== Group stage ====
20 January 2014 1	Náutico	1–1	Guarany de Sobral	São Lourenço da Mata
21:00 (UTC-3)	Renato Henrique 54'	Report	Zeca 58'	Stadium: Estádio Governador Carlos Wilson Campos (Arena Pernambuco); Attendance: 9,268; Referee: Gleidson Santos Oliveira

23 January 2014 2	Sport	0–1	Náutico	Recife
22:30 (UTC-3)		Report	Zé Mário 39'	Stadium: Estádio Adelmar da Costa Carvalho (Ilha do Retiro); Attendance: 15,044; Referee: Gilberto Rodrigues Castro Junior

4 February 2014 3	Botafogo–PB	1–1	Náutico	João Pessoa
20:00 (UTC-3)	Doda 52'	Report	Hugo Almeida 65'	Stadium: Estádio José Américo de Almeida Filho (Almeidão); Attendance: 8,400; Referee: Suelson Diorgenes de França Medeiros

30 January 2014 4	Náutico	0–1	Botafogo–PB	São Lourenço da Mata
22:30 (UTC-3)		Report	Lenilson 2'	Stadium: Estádio Governador Carlos Wilson Campos (Arena Pernambuco); Attendance: 9,385; Referee: Claudio Francisco Lima e Silva

2 February 2014 5	Náutico	0–3	Sport	São Lourenço da Mata
19:30 (UTC-3)		Report	Ananias 14'; Erico Junior 47'; Neto Baiano 87'	Stadium: Estádio Governador Carlos Wilson Campos (Arena Pernambuco); Attendance: 13,062; Referee: Emerson Luiz Sobral

6 February 2014 6	Guarany de Sobral	1–1	Náutico	Sobral
21:30 (UTC-3)	Reinaldo 9'	Report	Marcos Vinícius 19'	Stadium: Estádio Municipal Plácido Aderaldo Castelo (Junco); Attendance: 5,216; Referee: Charles Hebert Cavalcante Ferreira

==== Record ====
Final Position	Points	Matches	Wins	Draws	Losses	Goals For	Goals Away	Avg%
11th	6	6	1	3	2	4	7	33%

=== Campeonato Pernambucano ===
==== First stage ====
13 February 2014 2	Central	1–1	Náutico	Caruaru
20:00 (UTC-3)	Danilo Lins 90+2'	Report	Hugo Almeida 37'	Stadium: Estádio Luiz José de Lacerda (Lacerdão)

19 February 2014 3	Santa Cruz	0–0	Náutico	Recife
20:30 (UTC-3)		Report		Stadium: Estádio José do Rego Maciel (Arruda); Referee: Emerson Sobral

23 February 2014 4	Náutico	3–0	Porto	São Lourenço da Mata
16:00 (UTC-3)	Marcos Vinícius 24'; Pedro Carmona 27'; Hélder Maurílio 38'	Report		Stadium: Estádio Governador Carlos Wilson Campos (Arena Pernambuco); Attendance: 5,253; Referee: Luiz Cláudio Sobral

27 February 2014 1*	Náutico	2–1	Sport	São Lourenço da Mata
20:00 (UTC-3)	Pedro Carmona 9', 71'	Report	Ewerton Páscoa 48'	Stadium: Estádio Governador Carlos Wilson Campos (Arena Pernambuco); Referee: Gleydson Ferreira Leite

5 March 2014 5	Náutico	0–2	Salgueiro	São Lourenço da Mata
22:00 (UTC-3)		Report	Vitor Caicó 52'; Fabrício Ceará 90+2'	Stadium: Estádio Governador Carlos Wilson Campos (Arena Pernambuco)

8 March 2014 6	Porto	1–4	Náutico	Caruaru
16:00 (UTC-3)	Thaciano	Report	Elicarlos; Pedro Carmona,,	Stadium: Estádio Luiz José de Lacerda (Lacerdão)

16 March 2014 7	Náutico	2–1	Central	São Lourenço da Mata
16h00 (UTC-3)	Hugo Cabral 18'; Diego Teles 50' (o.g.)	Report	Jean Batista 68'	Stadium: Estádio Governador Carlos Wilson Campos (Arena Pernambuco); Attendance: 7,324; Referee: Luiz Cláudio Sobral

23 March 2014 8	Náutico	3–5	Santa Cruz	São Lourenço da Mata
16:00 (UTC-3)	Hugo Cabral 3'; Elicarlos 86'; William Alves 87'	Report	Renan Fonseca 23'; Izaldo 34' (o.g.); Léo Gamalho 42', 51'; Betinho 68'	Stadium: Estádio Governador Carlos Wilson Campos (Arena Pernambuco); Attendance: 15,683; Referee: Gilberto Castro Júnior

26 March 2014 9	Salgueiro	1–3	Náutico	Salgueiro
20:00 (UTC-3)	Valdeir 77'	Report	Marinho 3'; Marcelinho 42'; Jackson 86'	Stadium: Estádio Cornélio de Barros (Salgueirão); Attendance: 8,761; Referee: Neilson dos Santos

30 March 2014 10	Sport	0–1	Náutico	Recife
16:00 (UTC-3)		Report	Marcos Vinícius 73'	Stadium: Estádio Adelmar da Costa Carvalho (Ilha do Retiro); Attendance: 14,846; Referee: Emerson Sobral

==== Semi-finals ====
6 April 2014	Salgueiro	2–0	Náutico	Salgueiro
16:00 (UTC-3)	Everton 24'; Kanu 82'	Report		Stadium: Estádio Cornélio de Barros (Salgueirão); Attendance: 8,902; Referee: Sebastião Rufino Filho

12 April 2014	Náutico	1–0 (5–3 p)	Salgueiro	São Lourenço da Mata
18:30 (UTC-3)	Vina 68'	Report		Stadium: Estádio Governador Carlos Wilson Campos (Arena Pernambuco); Attendance: 16,502; Referee: Emerson Sobral
	Penalties
	Penalty scored		Penalty scored

==== Finals ====
16 April 2014	Sport	2–0	Náutico	Recife
22:00 (UTC-3)	Patric 64'; Neto Baiano 84'	Report		Stadium: Estádio Adelmar da Costa Carvalho (Ilha do Retiro); Attendance: 26,173; Referee: Wilton Sampaio

23 April 2014	Náutico	0–1	Sport	São Lourenço da Mata
22:00 (UTC-3)		Report	Durval 76'	Stadium: Estádio Governador Carlos Wilson Campos (Arena Pernambuco); Attendance: 30,061; Referee: Leandro Pedro Vuaden

==== Record ====
Final Position	Points	Matches	Wins	Draws	Losses	Goals For	Goals Away	Avg%
2nd	23	14	7	2	5	20	17	54%

=== Copa do Brasil ===
==== First round ====
12 March 2014	Sergipe	1–0	Náutico	Itabaiana
20:30 (UTC-3)	Rafael 27'	Report		Stadium: Estádio Presidente Médici; Attendance: 1,045; Referee: Marielson Alves Silva

9 April 2014	Náutico	1–0 (3–1 p)	Sergipe	São Lourenço da Mata
19:30 (UTC-3)	Marcelinho 79'			Stadium: Estádio Governador Carlos Wilson Campos (Arena Pernambuco); Attendance: 1,497; Referee: Charles Hebert Cavalcante Ferreira
	Penalties
	Elicarlos (penalty scored); Zé Mário (penalty scored); Marcelinho (penalty scored)		(penalty scored) Raphinha; (penalty missed) Fernando Belém; (penalty missed) João Paulo; (penalty missed) Lelo

==== Second round ====
6 May 2014	América–RN	3–0	Náutico	Natal
21:50 (UTC-3)	Isac 30'; Max 83', 90+1'			Stadium: Arena das Dunas; Referee: Francisco de Assis Almeida Filho

13 May 2014	Náutico	2–0	América–RN	São Lourenço da Mata
19:30 (UTC-3)	Flávio Ramos 64', 69'			Stadium: Estádio Governador Carlos Wilson Campos (Arena Pernambuco); Attendance: 354; Referee: Thiago Duarte Peixoto

==== Record ====
Final Position	Points	Matches	Wins	Draws	Losses	Goals For	Goals Away	Avg%
32nd	6	4	2	0	2	3	4	50%

=== Série B ===
19 April 2014 1	Bragantino	2–2	Náutico	Bragança Paulista
16:20 (UTC-3)	Tássio 45+2'; Léo Jaime 68'	Report	Hugo Almeida 71'; Lelêu 90'	Stadium: Estádio Nabi Abi Chedid; Attendance: 884; Referee: Alinor Silva da Paixão

26 April 2014 2	Náutico	2–0	Vila Nova	São Lourenço da Mata
16:20 (UTC-3)	Careca 34', 75'	Report		Stadium: Estádio Governador Carlos Wilson Campos (Arena Pernambuco); Attendance: 4,923; Referee: Avelar Rodrigo da Silva

3 May 2014 3	Ceará	2–2	Náutico	Fortaleza
16:20 (UTC-3)	Ricardinho 66'; Gil 86'	Report	Raí 25'; Elicarlos 51'	Stadium: Estádio Governador Plácido Castelo (Castelão); Attendance: 9,429; Referee: Luiz Flávio de Oliveira

10 May 2014 4	Joinville	1–0	Náutico	Joinville
16:20 (UTC-3)	Jael 87'	Report		Stadium: Arena Joinville; Attendance: 8,125; Referee: Pablo dos Santos Alves

20 May 2014 6	Náutico	2–1	Portuguesa	São Lourenço da Mata
21:50 (UTC-3)	William Alves 58'; Vina 88'	Report	Romão 7' (pen.)	Stadium: Estádio Governador Carlos Wilson Campos (Arena Pernambuco); Attendance: 3,054; Referee: Claudio Francisco Lima e Silva

24 May 2014 7	Paraná	2–0	Náutico	Curitiba
21:00 (UTC-3)	Giancarlo 6'; Leonardo Luiz 53' (o.g.)	Report		Stadium: Estádio Durival Britto e Silva (Vila Capanema); Attendance: 2,791; Referee: Philip Georg Bennett

27 May 2014 8	Náutico	0–1	Avaí	Recife
21:50 (UTC-3)		Report	Paulo Sérgio 30'	Stadium: Estádio Eládio de Barros Carvalho (Aflitos); Attendance: 9,030; Referee: Paulo Sergio Santos Moreira

31 May 2014 9	América–MG	1–3	Náutico	Muriaé
16:20 (UTC-3)	Mancini 54'	Report	William Alves 34'; Roberto 45+1'; Vina 48'	Stadium: Estádio Soares de Azevedo; Attendance: 3,001; Referee: Vinicius Furlan

3 June 2014 10	ABC	1–1	Náutico	Santa Cruz
21:50 (UTC-3)	Lúcio Flávio 10'	Report	Paulinho 61'	Stadium: Estádio Iberê Ferreira de Souza (Iberezão); Attendance: 1,083; Referee: Devarly Lira do Rosario

15 July 2014 11	Náutico	1–0	Sampaio Corrêa	São Lourenço da Mata
19:30 (UTC-3)	Tadeu 31'	Report		Stadium: Estádio Governador Carlos Wilson Campos (Arena Pernambuco); Attendance: 6,464; Referee: Arilson Bispo da Anunciacao

19 July 2014 12	Náutico	1–3	Boa Esporte	São Lourenço da Mata
21:00 (UTC-3)	Tadeu 48'	Report	Marinho Donizete 5'; Tomas Bastos 23'; Diego Oliveira 76'	Stadium: Estádio Governador Carlos Wilson Campos (Arena Pernambuco); Attendance: 5,498; Referee: Edmar Campos da Encarnação

26 July 2014 13	Atlético Goianiense	2–0	Náutico	Goiânia
16:20 (UTC-3)	Júnior Viçosa 53'; André Luís 67'	Report		Stadium: Estádio do Governo do Estado de Goiás (Serra Dourada); Attendance: 1,743; Referee: Wagner do Nascimento Magalhães

29 July 2014 14	Náutico	1–0	Icasa	São Lourenço da Mata
19:00 (UTC-3)	Marinho 38'	Report		Stadium: Estádio Governador Carlos Wilson Campos (Arena Pernambuco); Attendance: 3,326; Referee: Paulo H Schleich Vollkopf

9 August 2014 15	Santa Cruz	3–0	Náutico	Recife
16:20 (UTC-3)	Keno 57'; Wescley 73', 90+3'	Report		Stadium: Estádio José do Rego Maciel (Arruda); Attendance: 20,717; Referee: Pericles Bassols Pegado Cortez

12 August 2014 5*	Náutico	0–1	Vasco da Gama	São Lourenço da Mata
21:00 (UTC-3)		Report	Dakson 7'	Stadium: Estádio Governador Carlos Wilson Campos (Arena Pernambuco); Attendance: 9,417; Referee: Dewson Fernando Freitas

16 August 2014 16	Luverdense	0–2	Náutico	Cuiabá
16:20 (UTC-4)		Report	Crislan 19'; Sassá 52'	Stadium: Arena Pantanal; Attendance: 12,336; Referee: Héber Roberto Lopes

19 August 2014 17	Náutico	3–2	Oeste	São Lourenço da Mata
19:30 (UTC-3)	Mário Pablo 31'; Crislan 45'; Cañete 83'	Report	Roger Gaúcho 26'; Everton Dias 36'	Stadium: Estádio Governador Carlos Wilson Campos (Arena Pernambuco); Attendance: 6,368; Referee: Janio Pires Gonçalves

23 August 2014 18	Náutico	2–1	América–RN	São Lourenço da Mata
16:10 (UTC-3)	Paulinho 20'; Vina 63'	Report	Rafael Cruz 41' (o.g.)	Stadium: Estádio Governador Carlos Wilson Campos (Arena Pernambuco); Attendance: 11,239; Referee: Renato Cardoso da Conceição

30 August 2014 19	Ponte Preta	2–0	Náutico	Campinas
16:10 (UTC-3)	Rafael Costa 63'; Jonathan Cafú 79'	Report		Stadium: Estádio Moisés Lucarelli; Attendance: 7,028; Referee: André Luiz de Freitas Castro

6 September 2014 20	Náutico	0–0	Bragantino	São Lourenço da Mata
16:10 (UTC-3)		Report		Stadium: Estádio Governador Carlos Wilson Campos (Arena Pernambuco); Attendance: 10,165; Referee: Rodrigo D Alonso Ferreira

9 September 2014 21	Vila Nova	0–1	Náutico	Goiânia
19:30 (UTC-3)		Report	Crislan 9'	Stadium: Estádio do Governo do Estado de Goiás (Serra Dourada); Attendance: 2,293; Referee: Rodolpho Toski Marques

12 September 2014 22	Náutico	2–1	Ceará	São Lourenço da Mata
19:30 (UTC-3)	Sassá 8', 33'	Report	Magno Alves 61'	Stadium: Estádio Governador Carlos Wilson Campos (Arena Pernambuco); Attendance: 7,341; Referee: Fabio Filipus

16 September 2014 23	Náutico	1–2	Joinville	São Lourenço da Mata
19:30 (UTC-3)	Sassá 12'	Report	Edigar Junio 9', 44'	Stadium: Estádio Governador Carlos Wilson Campos (Arena Pernambuco); Attendance: 8,653; Referee: Francisco Carlos do Nascimento

20 September 2014 24	Vasco da Gama	2–1	Náutico	Rio de Janeiro
16:10 (UTC-3)	Dakson 77'; Kléber 88'	Report	Sassá 67' (pen.)	Stadium: Estádio Vasco da Gama (São Januário); Attendance: 11,998; Referee: Fabricio Neves Correa

23 September 2014 25	Portuguesa	0–0	Náutico	São Paulo
21:50 (UTC-3)		Report		Stadium: Estádio Oswaldo Teixeira Duarte (Canindé); Attendance: 1,215; Referee: Braulio da Silva Machado

26 September 2014 26	Náutico	3–1	Paraná	São Lourenço da Mata
19:30 (UTC-3)	Tadeu 3'; Bruno Furlan 45+1'; Vina 83'	Report	Henrique Santos 90+3'	Stadium: Estádio Governador Carlos Wilson Campos (Arena Pernambuco); Attendance: 5,219; Referee: Carlos Ronne Casas de Paiva

4 October 2014 27	Avaí	0–2	Náutico	Florianópolis
16:20 (UTC-3)		Report	Tadeu 16'; Bruno Furlan 87'	Stadium: Estádio Aderbal Ramos da Silva (Ressacada); Attendance: 8,551; Referee: Jailson Macedo Freitas

7 October 2014 28	Náutico	1–4	América–MG	São Lourenço da Mata
19:30 (UTC-3)	Renato Chaves 67'	Report	Gilson 21', 29'; Renan Oliveira 48'; Obina 55'	Stadium: Estádio Governador Carlos Wilson Campos (Arena Pernambuco); Attendance: 7,463; Referee: Rodrigo Batista Raposo

11 October 2014 29	Náutico	2–1	ABC	São Lourenço da Mata
16:10 (UTC-3)	Sassá 2', 85'	Report	Rodrigo Silva 49'	Stadium: Estádio Governador Carlos Wilson Campos (Arena Pernambuco); Attendance: 6,530; Referee: Felipe Duarte Varejão

18 October 2014 30	Sampaio Corrêa	1–1	Náutico	São Luís
16:10 (UTC-3)	Mimica 12'	Report	Paulinho 68'	Stadium: Estádio Governador João Castelo (Castelão); Attendance: 14,394; Referee: Edivaldo Elias da Silva

21 October 2014 31	Boa Esporte	1–0	Náutico	Varginha
21:50 (UTC-3)	Romão 17'	Report		Stadium: Estádio Municipal Prefeito Dilson Luiz de Melo (Melão); Attendance: 1,358; Referee: Antônio Denival de Morais

25 October 2014 32	Náutico	1–2	Atlético Goianiense	São Lourenço da Mata
17:20 (UTC-3)	Sassá 55'	Report	Thiago Primão 37'; Jorginho 65'	Stadium: Estádio Governador Carlos Wilson Campos (Arena Pernambuco); Attendance: 4,878; Referee: Raphael Claus

1 November 2014 33	Icasa	3–1	Náutico	Juazeiro do Norte
17:20 (UTC-3)	Nilson 14', 28'; Núbio Flávio 75'	Report	Crislan 19'	Stadium: Estádio Mauro Sampaio (Romeirão); Attendance: 5,653; Referee: Héber Roberto Lopes

8 November 2014 34	Náutico	0–0	Santa Cruz	São Lourenço da Mata
17:20 (UTC-3)		Report		Stadium: Estádio Governador Carlos Wilson Campos (Arena Pernambuco); Attendance: 10,947; Referee: Marielson Alves Silva

15 November 2014 35	Náutico	1–0	Luverdense	São Lourenço da Mata
17:20 (UTC-3)	Sassá 80'	Report		Stadium: Estádio Governador Carlos Wilson Campos (Arena Pernambuco); Attendance: 3,138; Referee: Antônio Dib Moraes de Sousa

18 November 2014 36	Oeste	2–0	Náutico	Itápolis
19:30 (UTC-3)	João Junior 13'; Waguininho 47'	Report		Stadium: Estádio Municipal dos Amaros; Attendance: 491; Referee: Bruno Arleu de Araujo

21 November 2014 37	América–RN	1–0	Náutico	Natal
19:30 (UTC-3)	Rodrigo Pimpão 27'	Report		Stadium: Arena das Dunas; Attendance: 15,592; Referee: Pathrice Wallace Correa Maia

29 November 2014 38	Náutico	1–1	Ponte Preta	São Lourenço da Mata
16:20 (UTC-3)	Vina 12'	Report	Renato Cajá 60'	Stadium: Estádio Governador Carlos Wilson Campos (Arena Pernambuco); Attendance: 2,312; Referee: Felipe Gomes da Silva

==== Record ====
Final Position	Points	Matches	Wins	Draws	Losses	Goals For	Goals Away	Avg%
13th	50	38	14	8	16	40	47	44%
