= 2021 Campeonato Goiano =

Campeonato Goiano
- Season: 2021
- Dates: 28 February – 23 May
- Champions: Grêmio Anápolis
- Relegated: Itumbiara; Jaraguá
- Copa do Brasil: Atlético Goianiense; Grêmio Anápolis; Vila Nova
- Série D: Anápolis; Grêmio Anápolis; Iporá
- Copa Verde: Grêmio Anápolis
- Matches played: 74
- Goals scored: 151 (2.04 per match)
- Top goalscorer: Alex Henrique (8 goals)

The 2021 Campeonato Goiano (officially the Campeonato Goiano de Profissionais da 1ª Divisão – Edição 2021) was the 78th edition of Goiás's top professional football league organized by FGF. The competition began on 28 February 2021.

The competition counted with the return of Itumbiara and Jataiense (teams promoted from the 2020 Campeonato Goiano da Divisão de Accesso) that occupied the two places of the two 2020 relegated teams. Atlético Goianiense were the defending champions but they were eliminated in the semi-finals.

Due to the worsening of the COVID-19 pandemic in Brazil, the Government of Goiás suspended the Campeonato Goiano between 16 and 30 March 2021. The tournament resumed on 31 March 2021, and ended on 23 May 2021.

Tied 2–2 on aggregate, Grêmio Anápolis defeated Vila Nova on penalties 5–4 winning the Campeonato Goiano for the first time.

== Participating teams ==
Club	Home city	Manager
Anápolis	Anápolis	Luiz Carlos Winck
Aparecidense	Aparecida de Goiânia	Thiago Carvalho
Atlético Goianiense	Goiânia	Jorginho
CRAC	Catalão	Lucas Andrade
Goianésia	Goianésia	Ariel Mamede
Goiás	Goiânia	Pintado
Grêmio Anápolis	Anápolis	Cléber Gaúcho
Iporá	Iporá	Éverton Goiano
Itumbiara	Itumbiara	Júnior Lopes
Jaraguá	Jaraguá	Rafael Toledo
Jataiense	Jataí	Lucas Oliveira
Vila Nova	Goiânia	Wagner Lopes

== Format ==
In the first stage, the 12 teams were drawn into two groups of six teams each.

Group A	Group B
Atlético Goianiense; Jataiense; CRAC; Itumbiara; Grêmio Anápolis; Anápolis	Goiás; Vila Nova; Goianésia; Aparecidense; Iporá; Jaraguá

Each group was played on a home-and-away round-robin basis. The teams were ranked according to points. If tied on points, the following criteria would be used to determine the ranking: 1. Wins; 2. Goal difference; 3. Goals scored; 4. Head-to-head points 5. Fewest red cards; 6. Fewest yellow cards; 7. Draw. These criteria (except 4) also were used to determine the overall performance in the final stages.

The top four teams of each group advanced to the quarter-finals while the bottom team was relegated to 2022 Campeonato Goiano da Divisão de Accesso.

The final stages were played on a home-and-away two-legged basis. For the semi-finals and finals the best overall performance team hosted the second leg. If the score was level, a penalty shoot-out would be used to determine the winners.

Champions qualified for the 2022 Copa do Brasil and 2022 Copa Verde, while runners-up and third place only qualified for the 2022 Copa do Brasil. Top three teams not already qualified for 2022 Série A, Série B or Série C qualified for 2022 Campeonato Brasileiro Série D.

== First stage ==
=== Group A ===
Pos	Team	Pld	W	D	L	GF	GA	GD	Pts	Qualification or relegation
1	Atlético Goianiense	10	9	1	0	22	3	+19	28	Advance to Quarter-finals
2	Grêmio Anápolis	10	5	2	3	12	7	+5	17	Advance to Quarter-finals
3	Anápolis	10	5	1	4	8	10	−2	16	Advance to Quarter-finals
4	Jataiense	10	2	2	6	7	13	−6	8	Advance to Quarter-finals
5	CRAC	10	1	5	4	8	15	−7	8	
6	Itumbiara (R)	10	1	3	6	6	15	−9	6	Relegation to the Divisão de Acesso

Source: FGF
(R) Relegated

=== Group B ===
Pos	Team	Pld	W	D	L	GF	GA	GD	Pts	Qualification or relegation
1	Aparecidense	10	5	3	2	12	4	+8	18	Advance to Quarter-finals
2	Vila Nova	10	5	2	3	11	7	+4	17	Advance to Quarter-finals
3	Iporá	10	3	4	3	8	11	−3	13	Advance to Quarter-finals
4	Goiás	10	3	3	4	8	13	−5	12	Advance to Quarter-finals
5	Goianésia	10	2	5	3	9	9	0	11	
6	Jaraguá (R)	10	3	1	6	10	14	−4	10	Relegation to the Divisão de Acesso

Source: FGF
(R) Relegated

== Final stage ==
=== Bracket ===
Quarter-finals
Iporá	0	1	1
Grêmio Anápolis	0	2	2
Goiás	0	0	0
Atlético Goianiense	3	0	3
Anápolis	0	1	1
Vila Nova	3	3	6
Jataiense	0	1	1
Aparecidense	3	2	5

Semi-finals
Grêmio Anápolis (p)	1	1	2 (12)
Atlético Goianiense	0	2	2 (11)
Vila Nova	1	1	2
Aparecidense	1	0	1

Finals
Grêmio Anápolis (p)	1	1	2 (5)
Vila Nova	1	1	2 (4)

=== Quarter-finals ===
Team 1	Agg.	Team 2	1st leg	2nd leg
Goiás	0–3	Atlético Goianiense	0–3	0–0
Jataiense	1–5	Aparecidense	0–3	1–2
Iporá	1–2	Grêmio Anápolis	0–0	1–2
Anápolis	1–6	Vila Nova	0–3	1–3

==== Group C ====
25 April 2021
16:00

Goiás	0–3	Atlético Goianiense
	Report	João Paulo 45'; Arthur Gomes 52'; Janderson 80'

Estádio da Serrinha, Goiânia
Attendance: 0
Referee: Wilton Sampaio

2 May 2021
16:00

Atlético Goianiense	0–0	Goiás
	Report

Estádio Antônio Accioly, Goiânia
Attendance: 0
Referee: Elmo Alves Resende Cunha

Atlético Goianiense advanced to the semi-finals

==== Group D ====
25 April 2021
15:30

Jataiense	0–3	Aparecidense
	Report	Matheus 39'; Alex Henrique 74', 90+1'

Arapucão, Jataí
Attendance: 0
Referee: Eduardo Tomaz de Aquino Valadão

1 May 2021
16:00

Aparecidense	2–1	Jataiense
Alex Henrique 18'; Lucas Negueba 35' (pen.)	Report	Éverton 41'

Estádio Annibal Batista de Toledo, Aparecida de Goiânia
Attendance: 0
Referee: Victor Lucas Pereira Silva

Aparecidense advanced to the semi-finals

==== Group E ====
25 April 2021
15:30

Iporá	0–0	Grêmio Anápolis
	Report

Estádio Francisco José Ferreira, Iporá
Attendance: 0
Referee: Jefferson Ferreira de Moraes

1 May 2021
16:00

Grêmio Anápolis	2–1	Iporá
Matheus Passarinho 65' (pen.); Lucão 73'	Report	Roger Goiano 75'

Estádio Jonas Duarte, Anápolis
Attendance: 0
Referee: Wilton Sampaio

Grêmio Anápolis advanced to the semi-finals

==== Group F ====
25 April 2021
16:00

Anápolis	0–3	Vila Nova
	Report	Rafael Donato 11'; Arthur Rezende 45', 72'

Estádio Jonas Duarte, Anápolis
Attendance: 0
Referee: Osimar Moreira da Silva Júnior

30 April 2021
15:30

Vila Nova	3–1	Anápolis
Kelvin 8', 45+1'; Henan 38' (pen.)	Report	João Paulo 64'

Estádio Onésio Brasileiro Alvarenga, Goiânia
Attendance: 0
Referee: Rubens Paulo Rodrigues dos Santos

Vila Nova advanced to the semi-finals

=== Semi-finals ===
Team 1	Agg.	Team 2	1st leg	2nd leg
Grêmio Anápolis	2–2 (12–11 p)	Atlético Goianiense	1–0	1–2
Vila Nova	2–1	Aparecidense	1–1	1–0

==== Group G ====
4 May 2021
18:00

Grêmio Anápolis	1–0	Atlético Goianiense
Lucão 81'	Report

Estádio Jonas Duarte, Anápolis
Attendance: 0
Referee: Elmo Alves Resende Cunha

9 May 2021
18:30

Atlético Goianiense	2–1	Grêmio Anápolis
Zé Roberto 82'; João Paulo 88'	Report	Ronald 65'
Penalties
João Paulo (penalty scored); André Luis (penalty scored); Janderson (penalty missed); Pablo Dyego (penalty scored); Zé Roberto (penalty scored); Marlon Freitas (penalty scored); Éder (penalty scored); Nathan Silva (penalty scored); Arnaldo (penalty scored); Danilo Gomes (penalty scored); Fernando Miguel (penalty scored); Zé Roberto (penalty scored); João Paulo (penalty missed)	11–12	(penalty missed) Baiano; (penalty scored) Danrlei; (penalty scored) Vinícius Alves; (penalty scored) Thiago Rubim; (penalty scored) Vítor Braga; (penalty scored) Gabriel Vidal; (penalty scored) Lúcio; (penalty scored) Neto; (penalty scored) Gut; (penalty scored) Roger; (penalty scored) Jordan; (penalty scored) Danrlei; (penalty scored) Vinícius Alves

Estádio Antônio Accioly, Goiânia
Attendance: 0
Referee: Osimar Moreira da Silva Júnior

Grêmio Anápolis advanced to the finals

==== Group H ====
5 May 2021
20:30

Vila Nova	1–1	Aparecidense
Henan 46'	Report	Ricardo Lima 66'

Estádio Onésio Brasileiro Alvarenga, Goiânia
Attendance: 0
Referee: Jefferson Ferreira de Moraes

9 May 2021
16:00

Aparecidense	0–1	Vila Nova
	Report	Rafael Donato 25'

Estádio Annibal Batista de Toledo, Aparecida de Goiânia
Attendance: 0
Referee: Elmo Alves Resende Cunha

Vila Nova advanced to the finals

=== Finals ===
Team 1	Agg.	Team 2	1st leg	2nd leg
Grêmio Anápolis	2–2 (5–4 p)	Vila Nova	1–1	1–1

==== Matches ====
16 May 2021
16:00

Grêmio Anápolis	1–1	Vila Nova
Lucão 64'	Report	Henan 48'

Estádio Jonas Duarte, Anápolis
Attendance: 0
Referee: Wilton Sampaio

23 May 2021
16:00

Vila Nova	1–1	Grêmio Anápolis
Willian Formiga 83'	Report	Vinícius Alves 61'
Penalties
Henan (penalty scored); Arthur Rezende (penalty missed); Rafael Donato (penalty scored); Pedro Bambú (penalty scored); Pedro Júnior (penalty scored)	4–5	(penalty scored) Vinícius Alves; (penalty scored) Thiago Rubim; (penalty scored) Gabriel Vidal; (penalty scored) Luizão; (penalty scored) Vítor Braga

Estádio Onésio Brasileiro Alvarenga, Goiânia
Attendance: 0
Referee: Elmo Alves Resende Cunha

== General table ==
Pos	Team	Pld	W	D	L	GF	GA	GD	Pts	Qualification or relegation
1	Grêmio Anápolis	16	7	5	4	18	12	+6	26	Champions, 2022 Copa do Brasil and 2022 Série D
2	Vila Nova	16	8	5	3	21	11	+10	29	Runners-up and 2022 Copa do Brasil
3	Atlético Goianiense	14	11	2	1	27	5	+22	35	2022 Copa do Brasil
4	Aparecidense	14	7	4	3	18	7	+11	25	
5	Anápolis	12	5	1	6	9	16	−7	16	2022 Série D
6	Iporá	12	3	5	4	9	13	−4	14	2022 Série D
7	Goiás	12	3	4	5	8	16	−8	13	
8	Jataiense	12	2	2	8	8	18	−10	8	
9	Goianésia	10	2	5	3	9	9	0	11	
10	CRAC	10	1	5	4	8	15	−7	8	
11	Jaraguá	10	3	1	6	10	14	−4	10	Relegation to the 2022 Divisão de Acesso
12	Itumbiara	10	1	3	6	6	15	−9	6	Relegation to the 2022 Divisão de Acesso

Source: FGF
Rules for classification: 1) Points; 2) Wins; 3) Goal difference; 4) Goals scored; 5) Head-to-head points; 6) Fewest red cards; 7) Fewest yellow cards; 8) Draw.

== Top goalscorers ==
Rank	Player	Team	Goals
1	Alex Henrique	Aparecidense	8
2	Roberson	Atlético Goianiense	6
3	Lucão	Grêmio Anápolis	5
3	Vinícius Lopes	Goiás	5
3	Zé Roberto	Atlético Goianiense	5
6	Dimba	Jaraguá	4
6	Léo Carvalho	Goianésia	4
6	Pedro Júnior	Vila Nova	4
