= 2021 Copa Verde finals =

- Event: 2021 Copa Verde
Vila Nova	Remo
(Goiás)	(Pará)
0	0
- on aggregate Remo won 4–2 on penalties

First leg
Vila Nova	Remo
0	0
- Date: 8 December 2021
- Venue: Estádio Onésio Brasileiro Alvarenga, Goiânia
- Referee: Rodrigo Batista Raposo
- Attendance: 8,120

Second leg
Remo	Vila Nova
0	0
- Date: 11 December 2021
- Venue: Baenão, Belém
- Referee: Dyorgines José Padovani de Andrade
- Attendance: 12,702

The 2021 Copa Verde finals was the final two-legged tie that decided the 2021 Copa Verde, the 8th season of the Copa Verde, Brazil's regional cup football tournament organised by the Brazilian Football Confederation.

The finals were contested in a two-legged home-and-away format between Vila Nova, from Goiás, and Remo, from Pará.

The two matches ended in a scoreless draw, which meant the title was decided by a penalty shoot-out, which Remo won 4–2 to claim their first Copa Verde title.

== Teams ==
Team	Previous finals appearances (bold indicates winners)
(Goiás) Vila Nova	None
(Pará) Remo	2 (2015, 2020)

=== Road to the final ===
Note: In all scores below, the score of the finalist is given first.

(Goiás) Vila Nova			Round	(Pará) Remo		
Opponent	Venue	Score		Opponent	Venue	Score
Bye			First round	Bye		
(Espírito Santo) Rio Branco de Venda Nova	Home	3–0	Round of 16	(Acre (state)) Galvez	Home	9–0
(Mato Grosso do Sul) Aquidauanense (won 8–0 on aggregate)	Away	1–0	Quarter-finals	(Amazonas (Brazilian state)) Manaus (won 4–1 on aggregate)	Away	1–1
(Mato Grosso do Sul) Aquidauanense (won 8–0 on aggregate)	Home	7–0	Quarter-finals	(Amazonas (Brazilian state)) Manaus (won 4–1 on aggregate)	Home	3–0
(Mato Grosso) Nova Mutum (won 4–1 on aggregate)	Home	3–0	Semi-finals	(Pará) Paysandu (won 4–2 on aggregate)	Away	2–2
(Mato Grosso) Nova Mutum (won 4–1 on aggregate)	Away	1–1	Semi-finals	(Pará) Paysandu (won 4–2 on aggregate)	Home	2–0

== Format ==
The finals were played on a home-and-away two-legged basis. If tied on aggregate, the penalty shoot-out was used to determine the winner.

== Matches ==
=== First leg ===
8 December 2021
20:00 BRT (UTC−3)

Vila Nova (Goiás)	0–0	(Pará) Remo
	Report

Estádio Onésio Brasileiro Alvarenga, Goiânia
Attendance: 8,120
Referee: Rodrigo Batista Raposo (Distrito Federal)

**Vila Nova**	**Remo**

GK	1	(Brazil) Georgemy
DF	2	(Brazil) André Krobel
DF	3	(Brazil) Renato Silveira
DF	5	(Brazil) Rafael Donato (c)
DF	16	(Brazil) Bruno Collaço
MF	23	(Brazil) Pedro Bambú	(substituted off) 76'
MF	8	(Brazil) Moacir	(yellow card) 85'
MF	10	(Brazil) Tiago Real	(substituted off) 76'
FW	7	(Brazil) Diego Tavares
FW	11	(Brazil) Alesson	(yellow card) 36'
FW	9	(Brazil) Clayton	(substituted off) 65'
Substitutes:
GK	30	(Brazil) Pedro Campanelli
DF	13	(Brazil) Guilherme Paixão
DF	14	(Brazil) Ricardo Lima
MF	6	(Brazil) João Lucas
MF	15	(Brazil) Kallyl
MF	17	(Brazil) Éder Monteiro	(substituted on) 76'
MF	20	(Brazil) João Pedro	(substituted on) 76'
FW	18	(Brazil) Alan Grafite	(substituted on) 65'
FW	19	(Brazil) Breno
FW	21	(Brazil) Johnatan Cardoso
FW	22	(Brazil) Guilherme Pires
Coach:
(Brazil) Higo Magalhães

GK	1	(Brazil) Vinícius (c)
DF	2	(Brazil) Kevem
DF	3	(Brazil) Fredson
DF	4	(Brazil) Marlon
DF	6	(Brazil) Igor Fernandes
MF	5	(Brazil) Pingo	(substituted off) 80'
MF	8	(Brazil) Lucas Siqueira	(yellow card) 29'
MF	10	(Brazil) Felipe Gedoz	(substituted off) 90'
FW	7	(Brazil) Tiago Mafra	(substituted off) 46'
FW	11	(Brazil) Erick Flores	(substituted off) 46'
FW	9	(Brazil) Neto Pessoa	(substituted off) 90+3'
Substitutes:
GK	12	(Brazil) Thiago Coelho
MF	13	(Brazil) Warley
MF	14	(Brazil) Paulinho Curuá	(substituted on) 80'
MF	16	(Brazil) Tiago Miranda
MF	18	(Brazil) Neto Moura	(substituted on) 90'
FW	15	(Brazil) Ronald	(substituted on) 46'
FW	17	(Brazil) Jefferson
FW	19	(Brazil) Lucas Tocantins	(substituted on) 46'
FW	20	(Brazil) Renan Gorne	(substituted on) 90+3'
Coach:
(Brazil) Eduardo Baptista

Assistant referees:
Lucas Costa Modesto (Distrito Federal)
Lehi Sousa Silva (Distrito Federal)
Fourth official:
Christiano Gayo Nascimento (Distrito Federal)
Fifth official:
Márcio Soares Maciel (Goiás)
Video assistant referee:
Marco Aurélio Augusto Fazekas Ferreira (Minas Gerais)
Assistant video assistant referees:
Ciro Chaban Junqueira (Distrito Federal)
Marrubson Melo Freitas (Distrito Federal)

=== Second leg ===
11 December 2021
17:00 BRT (UTC−3)

Remo (Pará)	0–0	(Goiás) Vila Nova
	Report
Penalties
Neto Pessoa (penalty scored); Raimar (penalty scored); Marlon (penalty scored); Fredson (penalty scored)	4–2	(penalty scored) Clayton; (penalty scored) Rafael Donato; (penalty missed) André Krobel; (penalty missed) Johnatan Cardoso

Baenão, Belém
Attendance: 12,702
Referee: Dyorgines José Padovani de Andrade (Espírito Santo)

**Remo**	**Vila Nova**

GK	1	(Brazil) Vinícius (c)
DF	2	(Brazil) Kevem
DF	3	(Brazil) Fredson
DF	4	(Brazil) Marlon
DF	6	(Brazil) Igor Fernandes		(substituted off) 46'
MF	5	(Brazil) Pingo
MF	8	(Brazil) Lucas Siqueira	(yellow card) 60'	(substituted off) 76'
MF	10	(Brazil) Felipe Gedoz
FW	7	(Brazil) Ronald		(substituted off) 76'
FW	11	(Brazil) Erick Flores		(substituted off) 59'
FW	9	(Brazil) Neto Pessoa
Substitutes:
GK	12	(Brazil) Thiago Coelho
DF	13	(Brazil) Wellington Silva
DF	14	(Brazil) Raimar		(substituted on) 46'
MF	16	(Brazil) Paulinho Curuá	(yellow card) 90+2'	(substituted on) 76'
MF	18	(Brazil) Neto Moura
MF	21	(Brazil) Tiago Miranda
MF	22	(Brazil) Warley
FW	15	(Brazil) Tiago Mafra	(yellow card) 78'	(substituted on) 62'
FW	17	(Brazil) Jefferson		(substituted on) 76'
FW	19	(Brazil) Lucas Tocantins	(substituted off) 62'	(substituted on) 59'
FW	20	(Brazil) Renan Gorne
Coach:
(Brazil) Eduardo Baptista

GK	1	(Brazil) Georgemy
DF	2	(Brazil) André Krobel	(yellow card) 90+7'
DF	3	(Brazil) Renato Silveira
DF	5	(Brazil) Rafael Donato (c)
DF	16	(Brazil) Bruno Collaço
MF	8	(Brazil) Moacir	(substituted off) 80'
MF	15	(Brazil) Éder Monteiro	(yellow card) 76'
MF	23	(Brazil) Pedro Bambú	(substituted off) 59'
FW	7	(Brazil) Diego Tavares
FW	11	(Brazil) Rafael Silva	(substituted off) 75'
FW	9	(Brazil) Clayton	(yellow card) 1'
Substitutes:
GK	30	(Brazil) Pedro Campanelli
DF	14	(Brazil) Ricardo Lima
MF	10	(Brazil) Tiago Real	(substituted on) 59'
MF	17	(Brazil) Kallyl	(substituted on) 80'
MF	20	(Brazil) João Pedro
MF	22	(Brazil) João Lucas
FW	18	(Brazil) Alan Grafite
FW	21	(Brazil) Johnatan Cardoso	(substituted on) 75'
Coach:
(Brazil) Higo Magalhães

Assistant referees:
Fabiano da Silva Ramires (Espírito Santo)
Vanderson Antônio Zanotti (Espírito Santo)
Fourth official:
Arthur Gomes Rabelo (Espírito Santo)
Fifth official:
Bárbara Roberta da Costa Loiola (Pará)
Video assistant referee:
Daiane Caroline Muniz dos Santos (São Paulo)
Assistant video assistant referees:
Alisson Sidnei Furtado (Tocantins)
Marrubson Melo Freitas (Distrito Federal)

== See also ==
- 2022 Copa do Brasil
