= 2020 Campeonato Goiano =

Campeonato Goiano
- Season: 2020
- Champions: Atlético Goianiense
- Relegated: Anapolina; Goiânia
- Copa do Brasil: Atlético Goianiense; Goianésia; Jaraguá
- Série D: Aparecidense; Goianésia; Jaraguá
- Copa Verde: Atlético Goianiense
- Matches played: 79
- Goals scored: 187 (2.37 per match)
- Top goalscorer: Alex Henrique (8 goals)

The 2020 Campeonato Goiano (officially the Campeonato Goiano de Profissionais da 1ª Divisão – Edição 2020) was the 77th edition of Goiás's top professional football league. The competition began on 22 January 2020 and ended on 27 February 2021.

On 17 March 2020, FGF suspended the Campeonato Goiano indefinitely due to the coronavirus pandemic in Brazil. Some months later, on 4 August 2020, they announced that the tournament would be resumed on 13 January 2021.

Atlético Goianiense, the defending champions, defeated Goianésia on penalties in the final, capturing their 15th title.

== Participating teams ==
Club	Home city
Anapolina	Anápolis
Anápolis	Anápolis
Aparecidense	Aparecida de Goiânia
Atlético Goianiense	Goiânia
CRAC	Catalão
Goianésia	Goianésia
Goiânia	Goiânia
Goiás	Goiânia
Grêmio Anápolis	Anápolis
Iporá	Iporá
Jaraguá	Jaraguá
Vila Nova	Goiânia

== Format ==
In the first stage, the 12 teams were drawn into two groups of six teams each.

Group A	Group B
Atlético Goianiense; Vila Nova; Goianésia; Anapolina; Aparecidense; Iporá	Goiás; Goiânia; Jaraguá; Anápolis; Grêmio Anápolis; CRAC

Each team played on a home-and-away two-legged basis against the six clubs from the other group. The teams were ranked according to points. If tied on points, the following criteria would be used to determine the ranking: 1. Wins; 2. Goal difference; 3. Goals scored; 4. Fewest red cards; 5. Fewest yellow cards; 6. Draw. These criteria also were used to determine the overall performance in the final stage.

The top eight teams in the first stage advanced to the quarter-finals, while the bottom two teams were relegated to the Divisão de Acesso (2ª Divisão) de 2021.

Originally, the final stage would be played on a home-and-away two-legged basis, but due to the coronavirus pandemic the final stage was played on a single-legged basis with the best overall performance team hosting the match. If the score was level, a penalty shoot-out would be used to determine the winner.

Champions qualified for the 2021 Copa do Brasil and 2021 Copa Verde, while runners-up and third place only qualified for the 2021 Copa do Brasil. Top three teams not already qualified for 2021 Série A, Série B or Série C qualified for 2021 Campeonato Brasileiro Série D.

== First stage ==
Pos	Grp	Team	Pld	W	D	L	GF	GA	GD	Pts	Qualification or relegation
1	A	Atlético Goianiense	12	8	2	2	27	8	+19	26	Advance to Quarter-finals
2	B	Goiás	12	6	4	2	18	13	+5	22	Advance to Quarter-finals
3	B	Jaraguá	12	6	2	4	15	14	+1	20	Advance to Quarter-finals
4	A	Goianésia	12	5	3	4	12	12	0	18	Advance to Quarter-finals
5	B	CRAC	12	4	5	3	11	11	0	17	Advance to Quarter-finals
6	A	Vila Nova	12	4	4	4	13	7	+6	16	Advance to Quarter-finals
7	A	Aparecidense	12	4	3	5	16	16	0	15	Advance to Quarter-finals
8	B	Anápolis	12	3	6	3	12	15	−3	15	Advance to Quarter-finals
9	B	Grêmio Anápolis	12	4	2	6	13	16	−3	14	
10	A	Iporá	12	3	5	4	10	11	−1	14	
11	B	Goiânia (R)	12	3	2	7	8	22	−14	11	Relegation to the Divisão de Acesso
12	A	Anapolina (R)	12	1	4	7	13	23	−10	7	Relegation to the Divisão de Acesso

Source: FGF
(R) Relegated

== Final stage ==
=== Bracket ===
Quarter-finals
Atlético Goianiense	5
Anápolis	1
Goiás	0
Aparecidense	2
Jaraguá	1
Vila Nova	0
Goianésia	1
CRAC	0

Semi-finals
Atlético Goianiense	2
Aparecidense	1
Jaraguá	1
Goianésia	3

Final
Atlético Goianiense (p)	1 (5)
Goianésia	1 (3)

=== Quarter-finals ===
Team 1	Score	Team 2
Atlético Goianiense	5–1	Anápolis
Goiás	0–2	Aparecidense
Jaraguá	1–0	Vila Nova
Goianésia	1–0	CRAC

==== Group C ====
10 February 2021
17:00

Atlético Goianiense	5–1	Anápolis
Zé Roberto 14', 60'; Dudu 56'; Chico 84'; Roberson 87'	Report	Felipe Baiano 30'

Estádio Antônio Accioly, Goiânia
Attendance: 0
Referee: Osimar Moreira da Silva Júnior

Atlético Goianiense qualified for the semi-finals.

==== Group D ====
10 February 2021
21:30

Goiás	0–2	Aparecidense
	Report	Alex Henrique 46' (pen.); Albano 61'

Estádio da Serrinha, Goiânia
Attendance: 0
Referee: Eduardo Tomaz de Aquino Valadão

Aparecidense qualified for the semi-finals.

==== Group E ====
11 February 2021
15:30

Jaraguá	1–0	Vila Nova
Café 65'	Report

Estádio Amintas de Freitas, Jaraguá
Attendance: 0
Referee: Wilton Sampaio

Jaraguá qualified for the semi-finals.

==== Group F ====
11 February 2021
16:00

Goianésia	1–0	CRAC
Vanílson 45+1'	Report

Estádio Valdeir José de Oliveira, Goianésia
Attendance: 0
Referee: Elmo Alves Resende Cunha

Goianésia qualified for the semi-finals.

=== Semi-finals ===
Team 1	Score	Team 2
Atlético Goianiense	2–1	Aparecidense
Jaraguá	1–3	Goianésia

==== Group G ====
17 February 2021
16:10

Atlético Goianiense	2–1	Aparecidense
Janderson 44'; Zé Roberto 68'	Report	Ricardo Lima 17'

Estádio Antônio Accioly, Goiânia
Attendance: 0
Referee: Elmo Alves Resende Cunha

Atlético Goianiense qualified for the finals.

==== Group H ====
18 February 2021
15:30

Jaraguá	1–3	Goianésia
Anderson 45+2'	Report	Caio Acaraú 27'; Fábio Leite 45+4'; Rômulo 56' (pen.)

Estádio Amintas de Freitas, Jaraguá
Attendance: 0
Referee: Wilton Sampaio

Goianésia qualified for the finals.

=== Final ===
27 February 2021
16:30

Atlético Goianiense	1–1	Goianésia
Zé Roberto 47'	Report	Vanílson 78' (pen.)
Penalties
Jean (penalty scored); Chico (penalty scored); João Victor (penalty scored); Roberson (penalty scored); Zé Roberto (penalty scored)	5–3	(penalty scored) Fabinho Alves; (penalty scored) Dudu Itapajé; (penalty scored) Vanílson; (penalty missed) Iran

Estádio Antônio Accioly, Goiânia
Attendance: 0
Referee: Wilton Sampaio

== General table ==
Pos	Team	Pld	W	D	L	GF	GA	GD	Pts	Qualification or relegation
1	Atlético Goianiense	15	10	3	2	35	11	+24	33	Champions, 2021 Copa do Brasil and 2021 Copa Verde
2	Goianésia	15	7	4	4	17	14	+3	25	Runners-up, 2021 Copa do Brasil and 2021 Série D
3	Jaraguá	14	7	2	5	17	17	0	23	2021 Copa do Brasil and 2021 Série D
4	Aparecidense	14	5	3	6	19	18	+1	18	2021 Série D
5	Goiás	13	6	4	3	18	15	+3	22	
6	CRAC	13	4	5	4	11	12	−1	17	
7	Vila Nova	13	4	4	5	13	8	+5	16	
8	Anápolis	13	3	6	4	13	20	−7	15	
9	Grêmio Anápolis	12	4	2	6	13	16	−3	14	
10	Iporá	12	3	5	4	10	11	−1	14	
11	Goiânia	12	3	2	7	8	22	−14	11	Relegation to the Divisão de Acesso
12	Anapolina	12	1	4	7	13	23	−10	7	Relegation to the Divisão de Acesso

Source: FGF

== Top goalscorers ==
Rank	Player	Team	Goals
1	Alex Henrique	Aparecidense	8
2	Rafhael Lucas	Anapolina/Vila Nova	6
3	Matheuzinho	Atlético Goianiense	5
3	Renato Kayzer	Atlético Goianiense	5
5	Albano	Aparecidense	4
5	Du Gaia	Goiânia	4
5	Gustavo Henrique	Grêmio Anápolis	4
5	Ikaro	Anapolina	4
5	Zé Roberto	Atlético Goianiense	4
