= 2015 Cruzeiro EC season =

Cruzeiro
2015 season
- Manager: Marcelo Oliveira (until 31 May 2015); Vanderlei Luxemburgo (from 2 June – until 30 August 2015) Deivid de Souza (interim 2 September 2015) Mano Menezes (from 4 September 2015)
- Stadium: Mineirão
- Campeonato Brasileiro: 8th
- Copa do Brasil: Round of 16
- Campeonato Mineiro: Semi-finals
- Copa Libertadores: Quarter-finals
- Top goalscorer: Willian (11 goals)

The 2015 season is Cruzeiro's ninety-fourth season in existence and the club's forty-fifth consecutive season in the top flight of Brazilian football.

== Statistics ==
=== Hat tricks ===
Player	Against	Result	Date	Competition
(Brazil) Willian	(Brazil) Figueirense FC	5–1	6 September 2015	Campeonato Brasileiro Série A

=== Overall ===
Competition	First match	Last match	Starting round	Final position	Record							
Competition	First match	Last match	Starting round	Final position	Pld	W	D	L	GF	GA	GD	Win %
Campeonato Mineiro	1 February 2015	19 April 2015	Matchday 1	Semi-Finals	13	7	4	2	25	10	+15	53.85
Campeonato Brasileiro Série A	10 May 2015	6 December 2015	Matchday 1	8th	38	15	10	13	44	35	+9	39.47
Copa do Brasil	19 August 2015	26 August 2015	Round of 16	Round of 16	2	0	0	2	3	5	−2	0.00
Copa Libertadores	25 February 2015	27 May 2015	Group stage	Quarter-finals	10	5	2	3	10	7	+3	50.00
Total					63	27	16	20	82	57	+25	42.86

Source: Competitions

== Competitions ==
=== League table ===
Pos	Team	Pld	W	D	L	GF	GA	GD	Pts	Qualification or relegation
1	Caldense (A)	11	7	4	0	16	4	+12	25	Qualification to the knockout stage
2	Cruzeiro (A)	11	7	3	1	23	7	+16	24	Qualification to the knockout stage
3	Atlético Mineiro (A)	11	7	1	3	20	7	+13	22	Qualification to the knockout stage
4	Tombense (A)	11	6	2	3	17	14	+3	20	Qualification to the knockout stage
5	América Mineiro	11	5	5	1	12	7	+5	20	

Updated to match(es) played on 5 April 2015. Source:
Rules for classification: 1st points; 2nd wins; 3rd goal difference; 4th goals scored; 5th head-to-head points (only when two teams are tied) 5th less red cards received; 6th less yellow cards received; 7th public draw
(A) Advance to a further round

==== First stage ====
1 February 1	EC Democrata	1–2	Cruzeiro	Governador Valadares
				Stadium: Mamudão

8 February 2	Cruzeiro	1–1	Caldense	Belo Horizonte
				Stadium: Mineirão

11 February 3	Guarani	1–3	Cruzeiro	Divinópolis
				Stadium: Farião

21 February 4	Cruzeiro	3–0	Boa Esporte	Belo Horizonte
				Stadium: Mineirão

28 February 5	Tupi	0–3	Cruzeiro	Juiz de Fora
				Stadium: Mario Helênio

8 March 6	Cruzeiro	1–1	Atlético Mineiro	Belo Horizonte
				Stadium: Mineirão

11 March 7	Villa Nova	0–4	Cruzeiro	Nova Lima
				Stadium: Castor Cifuentes

22 March 8	América Mineiro	0–2	Cruzeiro	Belo Horizonte
				Stadium: Independência

25 March 9	Cruzeiro	1–1	Mamoré	Belo Horizonte
				Stadium: Mineirão

29 March 10	URT	0–2	Cruzeiro	Patos de Minas
				Stadium: Arena DanBred

5 April 11	Cruzeiro	1–2	Tombense	Belo Horizonte
				Stadium: Mineirão

==== Semi-finals ====
12 April First leg	Atlético Mineiro	1–1	Cruzeiro	Belo Horizonte
				Stadium: Estádio Independência

19 April Second leg	Cruzeiro	1–2 (2–3 agg.)	Atlético Mineiro	Belo Horizonte
				Stadium: Mineirão

=== League table ===
Pos	Team	Pld	W	D	L	GF	GA	GD	Pts	Qualification or relegation
6	Sport Recife	38	15	14	9	53	38	+15	59	2016 Copa Sudamericana second stage (Note: Teams will enter in the 2016 Copa Sudamericana if they do not reach the 2016 Copa do Brasil round of 16. Also, the 2015 Copa Verde champion (Cuiabá) and the 2016 Copa do Nordeste champion have a guaranteed berth.)
7	Santos	38	16	10	12	59	41	+18	58	2016 Copa Sudamericana second stage
8	Cruzeiro	38	15	10	13	44	35	+9	55	2016 Copa Sudamericana second stage
9	Palmeiras	38	15	8	15	60	51	+9	53	2016 Copa Libertadores second stage (Note: Palmeiras has a berth guaranteed to the second stage as the 2015 Copa do Brasil champions.)
10	Atlético Paranaense	38	14	9	15	43	48	−5	51	2016 Copa Sudamericana second stage

Source: Soccerway.com
Rules for classification: 1) points; 2) wins; 3) goal difference; 4) goals scored; 5) head-to-head results; 6) least red cards received; 7) least yellow cards received; 8) draw.

=== Results summary ===
Overall								Home						Away					
Pld	W	D	L	GF	GA	GD	Pts	W	D	L	GF	GA	GD	W	D	L	GF	GA	GD
38	15	10	13	44	35	+9	55	10	6	3	28	11	+17	5	4	10	16	24	−8

=== Results ===
10 May 1	Cruzeiro	0–1	Corinthians	Cuiabá
15:00 UTC−04:00		Report	Romero 82'	Stadium: Arena Pantanal (Note: Cruzeiro played their home match against Corinthians at a neutral venue due to a suspension imposed by the STJD regarding crowd disturbances in their home match against Atlético Mineiro at the 2014 Campeonato Brasileiro Série A); Attendance: 11,773; Referee: Anderson Daronco

17 May 2	Santos	1–0	Cruzeiro	Santos
16:00 UTC-03:00	Geuvânio 45'; Chiquinho (yellow card) 66'	Report	(yellow card) 65' Willians; (yellow card) 73' Fabrício; (yellow card) 84' Bruno Rodrigo; (yellow card) 90+3' Willian	Stadium: Vila Belmiro; Attendance: 7,246; Referee: Péricles Bassols

24 May 3	Cruzeiro	1–1	Ponte Preta	Belo Horizonte
	Paulo André (yellow card) 38'; Fabrício (yellow card) 41'; Charles 82' Biro Biro 85'		Pablo (yellow card) 31'; Juninho (yellow card) 77'; Biro Biro 85'	Stadium: Mineirão; Attendance: 9,639

31 May 4	Figueirense	2–1	Cruzeiro	Estádio Orlando Scarpelli
	Marquinho (yellow card) 32' (goal) 36'; Rafael Bastos 50' (yellow card) 79'; Marcão (yellow card) 89'		Mayke (yellow card) 56'; Willians (yellow card) 10' (yellow-red card) 71'; Charles (yellow card) 49'; Henrique Pacheco 41' (yellow card) 70'; Leandro (yellow card) 30'; Willian (yellow card) 33'	Attendance: 6,211

4 June 5	Cruzeiro	1–0	Flamengo	Belo Horizonte
2:00	Bruno Rodrigo (yellow card) 54'; Manoel 78'; Fábio (yellow card) 90'		Alecsandro (yellow card) 28'; Éverton (yellow card) 31'; Luiz Antônio (yellow card) 90+1'	Attendance: 12,071

6 June 6	Atlético Mineiro	1–3	Cruzeiro	Belo Horizonte
10:30			Jemerson 45+2' (o.g.); Gabriel Xavier 46'; Marquinhos 72'	Stadium: Estádio Independência; Attendance: 20,092

13 June 7	Vasco da Gama	1–3	Cruzeiro	Rio de Janeiro
	Luan Garcia (yellow card) 61'; Rodrigo (yellow card) 63' (goal) 88'		Pará (yellow card) 8'; Leandro Damião (yellow card) 21' (goal) 38', 74'; Willians (yellow card) 57'; Charles 58'; Joel (yellow card) 87'	Stadium: Estádio São Januário; Attendance: 5,505

21 June 8	Cruzeiro	0–1	Chapecoense	Belo Horizonte
3:00	Pará (yellow card) 3'; Henrique Pacheco Lima (yellow card) 34'; Bruno Ramires (yellow card) 70'; Bruno Rodrigo (yellow card) 90+1'		Fernando Camilo Farias 36'; Gil (yellow card) 67'; Neto (yellow card) 83'; Danilo (yellow card) 85'	Stadium: Mineirão; Attendance: 33,643

28 June 9	Coritiba	1–0	Cruzeiro	Curitiba
	Leandro Silva (yellow card) 12'; Rodrigo; Luccas Claro (yellow card) 31'; Lúcio Flávio (yellow card) 56'; Rafhael Lucas 62'; Esquerdinha (yellow card) 67'		Henrique Pacheco Lima (yellow card) 32'; Allano (yellow card) 36'; Paulo André (yellow card) 54'; Willians (yellow card) 89'; Marcos Vinícius (yellow card) 90+1'	Stadium: Estádio Couto Pereira; Attendance: 12,395

2 July 10	Grêmio	1–0	Cruzeiro	Belo Horizonte
	Luan (yellow card) 3'; Maicon (yellow card) 25'; Walace (yellow card) 40'; Pedro Geromel (yellow card) 57'; Douglas 69'; Rafael Galhardo (yellow card) 85'		Leandro Damião (yellow card) 40'; Willians (yellow card) 55'; Willian (yellow card) 68'; Bruno Rodrigo (yellow card) 68'; Mayke (yellow card) 73'	Stadium: Mineirão; Attendance: 7,427

4 July 11	Cruzeiro	2–0	Atlético Paranaense	Belo Horizonte
	Giorgian De Arrascaeta 41'; Marinho 73'		Natanael (yellow card) 62'; Giovanni (yellow card) 80'; Walter Henrique da Silva	Stadium: Mineirão; Attendance: 7,427

9 July 12	Fluminense	1–0	Cruzeiro	Rio de Janeiro
	Paulo André (yellow card) 21'; Willian (yellow card) 73'		Fred (yellow card) 59'; Victor Oliveira (yellow card) 82'	Stadium: Maracanã Stadium; Attendance: 16,391

12 July 13	Cruzeiro	1–0	Goiás	Belo Horizonte
	Leo (yellow card) 36'; Joel 38'; Marinho (yellow card) 72'		Diogo Barbosa (yellow card) 56'	Stadium: Mineirão; Attendance: 10,675

19 July 14	Cruzeiro	1–1	Avaí	Belo Horizonte
	Marcos Vinícius 13'; Marinho 46'		Romário (yellow card) 68'; André Lima (yellow card) 80' (goal) 82'; Everton Silva (yellow card) 90+1'	Stadium: Mineirão; Attendance: 13,860

26 July 15	São Paulo	1–0	Cruzeiro	São Paulo
	Pato 45'		Fabrício (yellow card) 90+3'	Stadium: Estádio do Morumbi; Attendance: 29,648

2 August 16	Sport	0–0	Cruzeiro	Recife
				Stadium: Arena Pernambuco

9 August 17	Cruzeiro	2–1	Palmeiras	Belo Horizonte
				Stadium: Mineirão

13 August 18	Joinville	3–0	Cruzeiro	Joinville
				Stadium: Arena Joinville

16 August 19	Cruzeiro	0–0	Internacional	Belo Horizonte
				Stadium: Mineirão

23 August 20	Corinthians	3–0	Cruzeiro	São Paulo
				Stadium: Arena Corinthians

30 August 21	Cruzeiro	0–1	Santos	Belo Horizonte
				Stadium: Mineirão

2 September 22	Ponte Preta	1–2	Cruzeiro	Campinas
				Stadium: Moisés Lucarelli

6 September 23	Cruzeiro	5–1	Figueirense	Belo Horizonte
				Stadium: Mineirão

10 September 24	Flamengo	2–0	Cruzeiro	Rio de Janeiro
				Stadium: Maracanã

13 September 25	Cruzeiro	1–1	Atlético Mineiro	Belo Horizonte
				Stadium: Mineirão

16 September 26	Cruzeiro	2–2	Vasco	Belo Horizonte
				Stadium: Mineirão

20 September 27	Chapecoense	0–2	Cruzeiro	Chapecó
				Stadium: Arena Condá

27 September 28	Cruzeiro	2–0	Coritiba	Belo Horizonte
				Stadium: Mineirão

4 October 29	Cruzeiro	0–0	Grêmio	Belo Horizonte
				Stadium: Mineirão

14 October 30	Atlético Paranaense	2–2	Cruzeiro	Curitiba
				Stadium: Arena da Baixada

18 October 31	Cruzeiro	2–0	Fluminense	Belo Horizonte
				Stadium: Mineirão

25 October 32	Goiás	0–1	Cruzeiro	Goiânia
				Stadium: Serra Dourada

31 October 33	Avaí	1–1	Cruzeiro	Florianópolis
				Stadium: Ressacada

8 November 34	Cruzeiro	2–1	São Paulo	Belo Horizonte
	Willian 33'; Manoel (yellow card) 63'; Leandro Damião 81'		Luís Fabiano 31'; Alan Kardec (yellow card) 84'; Thiago Mendes (yellow card) 86'	Stadium: Mineirão; Attendance: 33,417

15 November 35	Cruzeiro	3–0	Sport	Belo Horizonte
	Willian 43'; Willians Domingos Fernandes 59' (yellow card) 65'		Matheus Ferraz (yellow card) 41'; Durval 61' (o.g.); André (yellow card) 62'; Diego Souza (yellow card) 62'; Régis Augusto Salmazzo (yellow card) 75'	Stadium: Estadio Mineirão; Attendance: 25,851

21 November 36	Palmeiras	1–1	Cruzeiro	São Paulo
9:30	Pablo Mouche (yellow card) 63'; Leandro Almeida Silva (yellow card) 69'; Lucas Barrios 71'		Marcos Vinícius 20'; Giorgian De Arrascaeta (yellow card) 71'	Stadium: Allianz Parque; Attendance: 19,395

29 November 37	Cruzeiro	3–0	Joinville	Belo Horizonte
	Willian 35'; Charles 40'; Alisson 64'; Paulo André (yellow card) 76'; Fábio (yellow card) 85'		Kempes (yellow card) 54'; Gutieri Tomelin (yellow card) 71'; Danrlei Rosa dos Santos (yellow card) 72'	Stadium: Estadio Mineirão; Attendance: 24,933

6 December 38	Internacional	2–0	Cruzeiro	Porto Alegre
	Vitinho 26', 62' (yellow card) 84'; Andrigo		Douglas Grolli 44'	Stadium: Estádio Beira-Rio; Attendance: 29,836

== Copa do Brasil ==
=== Round of 16 ===
Cruzeiro joined the competition in the round of 16

19 August First leg	Palmeiras (São Paulo (state))	2–1	(Minas Gerais) Cruzeiro	São Paulo
22:00 (UTC−3)	Cleiton Xavier 7'; Zé Roberto (yellow card) 46'; Rafael Marques 62'	Report	Leandro Damião 49'; Fabrício (yellow card) 57'	Stadium: Allianz Parque; Attendance: 24,889; Referee: Marcelo de Lima Henrique (Pernambuco)

26 August Second leg	Cruzeiro (Minas Gerais)	2–3 (3–5 agg.)	(São Paulo (state)) Palmeiras	Belo Horizonte
22:00 (UTC−3)	Bruno Rodrigo (red card) 24'; Vinícius Araújo 38'; Alisson 75' (pen.)	Report	Barrios 8'; Amaral (yellow card) 17'; Gabriel Jesus 27', 32'; Zé Roberto (yellow card) 56'; João Pedro (yellow card) 74'; Robinho (yellow card) 84'	Stadium: Mineirão; Attendance: 16,972; Referee: Anderson Daronco (Rio Grande do Sul)

== Copa Libertadores ==
=== Group stage ===
Pos	Team	Pld	W	D	L	GF	GA	GD	Pts	Qualification
1	(Brazil) Cruzeiro	6	3	2	1	8	3	+5	11	Advance to final stages
2	(Bolivia) Universitario de Sucre	6	2	3	1	4	3	+1	9	Advance to final stages
3	(Argentina) Huracán	6	1	4	1	6	7	−1	7	
4	(Venezuela) Mineros de Guayana	6	1	1	4	5	10	−5	4	

Source: CONMEBOL
Rules for classification: Second stage tiebreakers

25 February	Universitario (Bolivia)	0–0	(Brazil) Cruzeiro	Estadio Olímpico Patria, Sucre
21:00 UTC−4		Report		Referee: Omar Ponce (Ecuador)

3 March	Cruzeiro (Brazil)	0–0	(Argentina) Huracán	Estádio Mineirão, Belo Horizonte
22:00 UTC−3		Report		Attendance: 25,867; Referee: Enrique Cáceres (Paraguay)

19 March	Mineros (Venezuela)	0–2	(Brazil) Cruzeiro	Estadio Cachamay, Puerto Ordaz
20:45 UTC−4:30		Report	Leandro Damião 10'; Marquinhos 82'	Referee: Carlos Vera (Ecuador)

8 April	Cruzeiro (Brazil)	3–0	(Venezuela) Mineros	Estádio Mineirão, Belo Horizonte
22:00 UTC−3	De Arrascaeta 12'; Leandro Damião 14'; Henrique 72'	Report		Attendance: 17,750; Referee: Jorge Osorio (Chile)

14 April	Huracán (Argentina)	3–1	(Brazil) Cruzeiro	Estadio Tomás Adolfo Ducó, Buenos Aires
19:00 UTC−3	Ábila 14', 25'; Mancinelli 62'	Report	Leandro Damião 60' (pen.)	Referee: Patricio Polic (Chile)

21 April	Cruzeiro (Brazil)	2–0	(Bolivia) Universitario	Estádio Mineirão, Belo Horizonte
20:30 UTC−3	Willian 37'; Léo 56'	Report		Attendance: 24,288; Referee: Roddy Zambrano (Ecuador)

=== Knockout phase ===
==== Round of 16 ====
6 May First leg	São Paulo (Brazil)	1–0	(Brazil) Cruzeiro	Estádio do Morumbi, São Paulo
22:00 UTC−3	Centurión 82'	Report		Attendance: 66,369; Referee: Carlos Amarilla (Paraguay)

13 May Second leg	Cruzeiro (Brazil)	1–0 (4–3 p)	(Brazil) São Paulo	Estádio Mineirão, Belo Horizonte
19:30 UTC−3	Leandro Damião 54'	Report		Attendance: 37,719; Referee: Andrés Cunha (Uruguay)
	Penalties
	Leandro Damião (penalty missed); Marquinhos (penalty scored); De Arrascaeta (penalty scored); Henrique (penalty scored); Manoel (penalty missed); Gabriel Xavier (penalty scored)		(penalty scored) Rogério Ceni; (penalty scored) Ganso; (penalty missed) Souza; (penalty missed) Luís Fabiano; (penalty scored) Centurión; (penalty missed) Lucão

===== Quarter finals =====
21 May First leg	River Plate (Argentina)	0–1	(Brazil) Cruzeiro	Estadio Antonio Vespucio Liberti, Buenos Aires
22:00 UTC−3		Report	Marquinhos 81'	Attendance: 35,000; Referee: Enrique Osses (Chile)

27 May Second leg	Cruzeiro (Brazil)	0–3	(Argentina) River Plate	Estádio Mineirão, Belo Horizonte
22:00 UTC−3		Report	Sánchez 19'; Maidana 44'; Gutiérrez 51'	Attendance: 54,890; Referee: Wilmar Roldán (Colombia)
