= Wanderson Lima =

Brazilian footballer

Personal information
- Full name: Wanderson Lima da Cunha
- Date of birth: 9 February 1995 (age 31)
- Place of birth: Goiânia, Brazil
- Height: 1.70 m (5 ft 7 in)
- Position: Defender

Team information
- Current team: Jaraguá

Youth career
- –2013: Vila Nova

Senior career*
Years	Team	Apps	(Gls)
2011–2015	Vila Nova	22	(0)
2016	Anápolis-GO		
2016	→ Tondela (loan)	7	(0)
2016–2017	Varzim	4	(0)
2017	Foz do Iguaçu	0	(0)
2017	Anápolis-GO	2	(0)
2017	Parauapebas	0	(0)
2017	Goiânia		
2018	Uberlândia	0	(0)
2018	Brasiliense	2	(0)
2018	Goiânia		
2019	Taubaté	0	(0)
2019–	Jaraguá		

International career^{‡}
2019	Brazil (University)	5	(0)
- * Club domestic league appearances and goals as of 18:02, 19 July 2019 (UTC) ‡ National team caps and goals as of 18:02, 19 July 2019 (UTC)

Wanderson Lima da Cunha (born 9 February 1995) is a Brazilian footballer who currently plays as a defender for Jaraguá.

== Career statistics ==
=== Club ===
As of 19 July 2019.

Club	Season	League			State League		National Cup		League Cup		Other		Total	
Club	Season	Division	Apps	Goals	Apps	Goals	Apps	Goals	Apps	Goals	Apps	Goals	Apps	Goals
Vila Nova	2011	Série B	1	0	0	0	0	0	–		0	0	1	0
Vila Nova	2012	Série C	0	0	0	0	0	0	–		0	0	0	0
Vila Nova	2013	Série C	0	0	2 (Note: Appearances in the Campeonato Goiano)	0	0	0	–		0	0	2	0
Vila Nova	2014	Série B	11	0	0	0	0	0	–		0	0	11	0
Vila Nova	2015	Série C	10	0	0	0	0	0	–		0	0	10	0
Vila Nova	Total		22	0	2	0	0	0	0	0	0	0	24	0
Tondela (loan)	2015–16	Primeira Liga	7	0	–		0	0	0	0	0	0	7	0
Varzim	2016–17	LigaPro	4	0	–		0	0	2 (Note: Appearances in the Taça da Liga)	0	0	0	6	0
Foz do Iguaçu	2017	Série D	0	0	6 (Note: Appearances in the Campeonato Paranaense)	0	0	0	–		0	0	6	0
Anápolis-GO	2017	Série D	2	0	0	0	0	0	–		0	0	2	0
Parauapebas	2017	–			5 (Note: Appearances in the Campeonato Paraense 2ªD)	0	0	0	–		0	0	5	0
Uberlândia	2018	Série D	0	0	2 (Note: Appearances in the Campeonato Mineiro)	0	2 (Note: Appearances in the Copa do Brasil)	0	–		0	0	4	0
Brasiliense	2018	Série D	2	0	0	0	0	0	–		0	0	2	0
Taubaté	2019	–			9 (Note: Appearances in the Campeonato Paulista A2)	0	0	0	–		0	0	9	0
Career total			37	0	24	0	2	0	2	0	0	0	65	0
