= João Lucas (footballer, born 2000) =

Brazilian footballer

Personal information
- Full name: João Lucas Vilela de Sousa
- Date of birth: 18 August 2000 (age 26)
- Place of birth: Iporá, Brazil
- Height: 1.81 m (5 ft 11 in)
- Position: Attacking midfielder

Team information
- Current team: Figueirense (on loan from Vila Nova)
- Number: 80

Youth career
- 2011–2014: São Paulo
- 2015–2018: Vila Nova
- 2018–2020: Ituano

Senior career*
Years	Team	Apps	(Gls)
2021	Iporá	11	(2)
2021–	Vila Nova	61	(5)
2021	→ Goianésia (loan)	8	(1)
2023	→ Manaus (loan)	10	(1)
2025–	→ Figueirense (loan)	0	(0)
- * Club domestic league appearances and goals as of 19:27, 12 November 2024 (UTC)

João Lucas Vilela de Sousa (born 18 August 2000), known as João Lucas, is a Brazilian footballer who plays as an attacking midfielder for Figueirense, on loan from Vila Nova.

== Career ==
Born in Iporá, Goiás, João Lucas represented São Paulo, Vila Nova and Ituano as a youth. In late 2020, after leaving the latter side amidst the COVID-19 pandemic, he returned to his hometown and joined Iporá EC.

On 10 May 2021, after impressing during the year's Campeonato Goiano, João Lucas returned to Vila and was now assigned to the main squad. On 30 June, however, he was loaned to Goianésia.

Upon returning, João Lucas renewed his contract with Vila Nova for two years on 11 December 2021. Roughly one year later, he signed a one-year extension, but was loaned to Manaus on 11 May 2023.

Back to Vila in July 2023, João Lucas started to feature more regularly with the first team in the following year.

== Career statistics ==
As of 12 November 2024.

Club	Season	League			State League		Cup		Continental		Other		Total	
Club	Season	Division	Apps	Goals	Apps	Goals	Apps	Goals	Apps	Goals	Apps	Goals	Apps	Goals
Iporá	2020	Goiano	—		1	0	—		—		—		1	0
Iporá	2021	Goiano	—		10	2	—		—		—		10	2
Iporá	Total		—		11	2	—		—		—		11	2
Vila Nova	2021	Série B	1	0	—		—		—		1 (Note: Appearance(s) in Copa Verde)	0	2	0
Vila Nova	2022	Série B	8	0	9	1	0	0	—		1	0	18	1
Vila Nova	2023	Série B	3	0	11	2	1	0	—		1	0	16	2
Vila Nova	2024	Série B	22	1	7	1	—		—		3	1	32	3
Vila Nova	Total		34	1	27	4	1	0	—		6	1	68	6
Goianésia (loan)	2021	Série D	8	1	—		—		—		—		8	1
Manaus (loan)	2023	Série C	10	1	—		—		—		—		10	1
Career total			52	3	38	6	1	0	0	0	6	1	97	10
