= Lucão (footballer, born 2000) =

Brazilian footballer

Personal information
- Full name: Lucas Gabriel Ribeiro Firmo
- Date of birth: 29 May 2000 (age 26)
- Place of birth: Patos de Minas, Brazil
- Height: 1.89 m (6 ft 2 in)
- Position: Forward

Team information
- Current team: Anápolis

Youth career
- 2014: URT
- 2015–2016: Mamoré
- 2017: América Mineiro
- 2018: Trindade
- 2019: Grêmio Anápolis
- 2019: → Trindade (loan)
- 2019: → Braga (loan)

Senior career*
Years	Team	Apps	(Gls)
2018	Trindade	1	(0)
2019–2022	Grêmio Anápolis	20	(5)
2020	→ Goianésia (loan)	10	(3)
2021	→ Atlético Goianiense (loan)	29	(2)
2022	→ Sanjoanense (loan)	14	(9)
2022–	Anápolis	0	(0)
2022–2023	→ Farense (loan)	28	(7)
2023–2024	→ Al-Khor (loan)	13	(6)
2024–2026	→ Al-Markhiya (loan)	26	(20)
- * Club domestic league appearances and goals as of 9 December 2024

Lucas Gabriel Ribeiro Firmo (born 29 May 2000), known as Lucão, is a Brazilian footballer who plays as a forward for Anápolis.

== Club career ==
Born in Patos de Minas, Minas Gerais, Lucão played for the youth categories of hometown sides URT and Mamoré before joining América Mineiro in 2017. He moved to Trindade in the following year, and played for their under-20 side before making his first team debut on 29 September 2018 by coming on as a second-half substitute in a 0–1 Campeonato Goiano Segunda Divisão home loss against CRAC.

Lucão signed for Grêmio Anápolis for the 2019 season, and played in two Campeonato Goiano matches before returning to Trindade to play for their under-20 side. In the middle of the year, he moved abroad and joined Portuguese side S.C. Braga, but only appeared for their under-23 team.

Lucão returned to Grêmio Anápolis in December 2019, but only featured sparingly before being loaned to Goianésia for the 2020 Série D. He returned to his parent club in January 2021, and scored five goals in the 2021 Goiano as his club won their first ever title.

On 26 May 2021, Lucão agreed to a loan deal with Série A side Atlético Goianiense until the end of the year, with a buyout clause. He made his debut in the category four days later, replacing Zé Roberto late into a 1–0 away win against Corinthians.

== Career statistics ==
As of 9 December 2024

Club	Season	League			State League		Cup		Continental		Other		Total	
Club	Season	Division	Apps	Goals	Apps	Goals	Apps	Goals	Apps	Goals	Apps	Goals	Apps	Goals
Trindade	2018	Goiano 2ª Divisão	—		1	0	—		—		—		1	0
Grêmio Anápolis	2019	Goiano	—		2	0	—		—		—		2	0
Grêmio Anápolis	2020	Goiano	—		3	0	—		—		—		3	0
Grêmio Anápolis	2021	Goiano	—		15	5	—		—		—		15	5
Grêmio Anápolis	Total		—		20	5	—		—		—		20	5
Goianésia (loan)	2020	Série D	10	3	—		—		—		—		10	3
Atlético Goianiense (loan)	2021	Série A	25	2	—		4	0	—		—		29	2
Sanjoanense (loan)	2021-22	Liga 3	14	9	—		—		—		—		14	9
Farense (loan)	2022-23	Liga 2	28	7	—		2	0	—		1	0	31	7
Al-Khor	2023–24	QSD	13	6	—		0	0	0	0	0	0	13	7
Al-Markhiya	2024–25	QSD	6	4	—		0	0	0	0	2	3	8	7
Career total			96	32	21	5	5	0	0	0	3	3	125	40

== Honours ==
Grêmio Anápolis

- Campeonato Goiano: 2021
