= Édson Júnior =

Brazilian footballer

Personal information
- Full name: Édson Fernandes Botelho Júnior
- Date of birth: 20 March 1995 (age 31)
- Place of birth: Goiânia, Brazil
- Height: 1.78 m (5 ft 10 in)
- Position: Forward

Team information
- Current team: Goianésia

Youth career
- 2014–2016: Goiás

Senior career*
Years	Team	Apps	(Gls)
2016	Goiás	3	(0)
2016–2021	Atlético Goianiense	4	(1)
2017	→ São Bernardo (loan)	2	(0)
2021–	Goianésia	0	(0)
- * Club domestic league appearances and goals as of 7 November 2020

Édson Fernandes Botelho Júnior (born 20 March 1995), known as Édson Júnior is a Brazilian footballer who plays as a forward for Goianésia.

== Career ==
Édson Júnior came through the youth ranks with Goiás before transferring to Atlético Goianiense in time for the 2016 Campeonato Brasileiro Série B season. He played twice as a substitute, making his debut against Avaí on 8 October 2016, and scoring his first goal against Sampaio Corrêa on 19 November 2016. For the 2017 Campeonato Brasileiro Série D season he was loaned to São Bernardo. On his return to Atlético Goianiense he suffered a serious knee ligament injury which kept him on the sidelines for the 2017 Campeonato Brasileiro Série A campaign.

Atlético Goianiense made Édson Júnior available for loan for the 2019 season.
