= Danrlei (disambiguation) =

Danrlei (Danrlei de Deus Hinterholz, born 1973) is a Brazilian politician and former football goalkeeper.

Danrlei may also refer to:

- Danrlei (footballer, born 1994), (Danrlei Rosa dos Santos), Spanish football defender
- Danrlei (footballer, born 1995), (Danrlei Medeiros Moreira), Brazilian football forward
