= Johnatan Cardoso =

Brazilian footballer (born 1997)

Personal information
- Full name: Johnatan Cardoso Dias
- Date of birth: 16 April 1997 (age 29)
- Height: 1.72 m (5 ft 8 in)
- Position: Forward

Team information
- Current team: Manaus

Senior career*
Years	Team	Apps	(Gls)
2017–2018	Trindade	1	(0)
2017	→ Jataiense (loan)	0	(0)
2017	→ Formosa (loan)	1	(0)
2019–2020	Grêmio Anápolis	11	(2)
2019	→ Iporá (loan)	6	(1)
2019–2020	→ Académico de Viseu (loan)	2	(0)
2020	Bosque Formosa	4	(1)
2020–2021	Aparecidense	32	(6)
2020–2022	Vila Nova	35	(1)
2022	Aparecidense	22	(1)
2023–	Manaus	13	(3)
- * Club domestic league appearances and goals as of 15:17, 4 June 2023 (UTC)

Johnatan Cardoso Dias (born 16 April 1997) is a Brazilian footballer who plays as a forward for Manaus.

== Career statistics ==
=== Club ===
As of 17 November 2019.

Club	Season	League			State League		Cup		Continental		Other		Total	
Club	Season	Division	Apps	Goals	Apps	Goals	Apps	Goals	Apps	Goals	Apps	Goals	Apps	Goals
Grêmio Anápolis	2019	–			11 (Note: Appearances in the Campeonato Goiano)	2	0	0	–		0	0	11	2
Iporá (loan)	2019	Série D	6	1	0	0	0	0	–		0	0	6	1
Académico de Viseu (loan)	2019–20	LigaPro	1	0	–		0	0	0	0	0	0	1	0
Career total			7	1	11	2	0	0	0	0	0	0	18	3
