= Túlio Borges =

Brazilian footballer

Personal information
- Full name: Túlio Borges Biancalana
- Date of birth: 12 September 1990 (age 36)
- Place of birth: São Paulo, Brazil
- Height: 1.81 m (5 ft 11 in)
- Position: Left midfielder

Youth career
- 2007–2010: Palmeiras

Senior career*
Years	Team	Apps	(Gls)
2011	Palmeiras B	0	(0)
2012	Universitatea Cluj	2	(0)
2013	Grêmio Anápolis	0	(0)
2013	Feirense	8	(0)
2014	Grêmio Anápolis	0	(0)
Total		10	(0)
- * Club domestic league appearances and goals

Túlio Borges Biancalana (born 12 September 1990) is a Brazilian former footballer who played as a midfielder.
