= Chico (footballer, born 1993) =

Brazilian footballer (born 1993)

Chico 김현솔
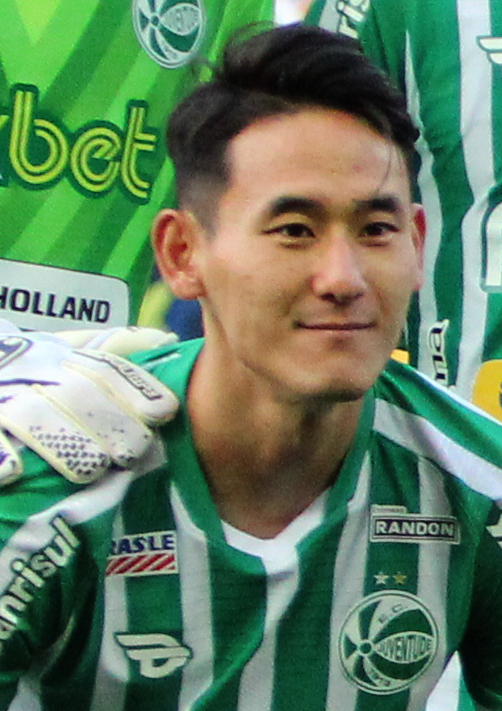
- Chico with Juventude in 2022

Personal information
- Full name: Francisco Hyun-sol Kim
- Date of birth: 17 May 1993 (age 33)
- Place of birth: Cascavel, Brazil
- Height: 1.75 m (5 ft 9 in)
- Position: Attacking midfielder

Team information
- Current team: Mirassol
- Number: 10

Youth career
- 2008–2011: Atlético Sorocaba

Senior career*
Years	Team	Apps	(Gls)
2010–2014	Atlético Sorocaba	9	(0)
2011	→ Águia Negra (loan)	16	(8)
2012	→ CENE (loan)	11	(6)
2012	→ Brasiliense (loan)	2	(1)
2013	→ Olímpia (loan)	9	(5)
2014	Tupi	15	(6)
2015	XV de Piracicaba	14	(1)
2015	Bragantino	31	(2)
2016	Capivariano	13	(1)
2016	Seoul E-Land	7	(0)
2017	CRB	52	(8)
2018	Pohang Steelers	5	(0)
2019–2020	Ceará	36	(5)
2020	→ Mirassol (loan)	9	(0)
2020–2021	Atlético Goianiense	43	(3)
2021–2022	Juventude	76	(3)
2023–	Mirassol	111	(9)
- * Club domestic league appearances and goals as of 13 December 2025

- Chico
- Hangul: 김현솔
- Hanja: 金賢率
- RR: Gim Hyeonsol
- MR: Kim Hyŏnsol

Francisco Hyun-sol Kim (Korean: 김현솔; born 17 May 1993), commonly known as Chico, is a Brazilian professional footballer who plays as an attacking midfielder for Mirassol.

== Club career ==
Chico was born in Cascavel, Paraná, but was raised in Ciudad del Este, Paraguay, to South Korean parents. In 2008, he went on a trial at Atlético Sorocaba, and subsequently joined the club's youth setup. Chico joined South Korean club Seoul E-Land on 27 July 2016.

== Career statistics ==
As of 29 November 2021

Appearances and goals by club, season and competition
Club	Season	National League			State League		Cup		Continental		Other		Total	
Club	Season	Division	Apps	Goals	Apps	Goals	Apps	Goals	Apps	Goals	Apps	Goals	Apps	Goals
Atlético Sorocaba	2010	Paulista A2	—		0	0	—		—		3 (Note: Appearance(s) in Copa Paulista)	2	3	2
Atlético Sorocaba	2011	Paulista A2	—		0	0	—		—		—		0	0
Atlético Sorocaba	2012	Paulista A2	—		1 (Note: Appearance(s) in Campeonato Paulista Série A2)	0	—		—		—		1	0
Atlético Sorocaba	2013	Paulista	—		1 (Note: Appearance(s) in Campeonato Paulista)	0	—		—		—		1	0
Atlético Sorocaba	2014	Paulista	—		7	0	—		—		—		7	0
Atlético Sorocaba	Total		—		9	0	—		—		3	2	12	2
Águia Negra (loan)	2011	Sul-Mato-Grossense	—		16 (Note: Appearance(s) in Campeonato Sul-Mato-Grossense)	8	—		—		—		16	8
CENE (loan)	2012	Série D	7	5	4	1	—		—		—		11	6
Brasiliense (loan)	2012	Série C	2	1	—		—		—		—		2	1
Olímpia (loan)	2013	Paulista 2ª Divisão	—		9 (Note: Appearance(s) in Campeonato Paulista Segunda Divisão)	5	—		—		—		9	5
Tupi	2014	Série C	15	6	—		—		—		—		15	6
XV de Piracicaba	2015	Paulista	—		14	1	—		—		—		14	1
Bragantino	2015	Série B	31	2	—		—		—		—		31	2
Capivariano	2016	Paulista	—		13	1	—		—		—		13	1
Seoul E-Land	2016	K League 2	7	0	—		—		—		—		7	0
CRB	2017	Série B	35	4	15 (Note: Appearance(s) in Campeonato Alagoano)	3	0	0	—		3 (Note: Appearance(s) in Copa do Nordeste)	1	53	8
Pohang Steelers	2018	K League 1	5	0	—		0	0	—		—		5	0
Ceará	2019	Série A	11	0	10 (Note: Appearance(s) in Campeonato Cearense)	3	4	0	—		9	2	34	5
Mirassol (loan)	2020	Paulista	—		9	0	—		—		—		9	0
Atlético Goianiense	2020	Série A	33	1	4 (Note: Appearance(s) in Campeonato Goiano)	1	5	1	—		1 (Note: Appearance in Copa Verde)	0	43	3
Juventude	2021	Série A	28	0	—		—		—		—		28	0
Career total			174	19	103	23	9	1	0	0	16	5	302	48

== Honours ==
Atlético Goianiense

- Campeonato Goiano: 2020
