= Zé Mário (footballer, born 1992) =

Brazilian footballer

Personal information
- Full name: José Mário de Bona
- Date of birth: 20 February 1992 (age 34)
- Place of birth: Medianeira, Brazil
- Height: 1.75 m (5 ft 9 in)
- Position: Left back

Team information
- Current team: Santa Cruz
- Number: 31

Senior career*
Years	Team	Apps	(Gls)
2011–2015	Internacional	10	(0)
2013	→ Caxias (loan)	18	(0)
2014	→ Náutico (loan)	17	(1)
2014	→ Sport (loan)	14	(0)
2015	→ ABC (loan)	2	(0)
2016	Ceará	4	(0)
2017	Ferroviária	3	(0)
2018	EC São José	0	(0)
2019	Maringá	1	(0)
2019	Sergipe	6	(0)
2020	Jaraguá	9	(1)
2020	Novo Hamburgo	4	(2)
2020–2021	Ypiranga	28	(4)
2021	Sampaio Corrêa	18	(0)
2022	Figueirense	31	(1)
2023	Inter de Limeira	14	(0)
2023	Botafogo PB	22	(0)
2024	Inter de Limeira	9	(2)
2024	Ponte Preta	4	(0)
2024	→ Mirassol Futebol (loan)	4	(0)
2025	Ferroviária	26	(1)
2026	Velo Clube	8	(0)
2026–	Santa Cruz	14	(0)
- * Club domestic league appearances and goals as of 9 November 2026

José Mário de Bona, known as Zé Mário (born 20 February 1992) is a Brazilian footballer who plays as a left back for Santa Cruz.

== Career statistics ==
=== Club ===
As of 6 August 2024

Appearances and goals by club, season and competition
Club	Season	League			State league		National Cup		Continental		Other		Total	
Club	Season	Division	Apps	Goals	Apps	Goals	Apps	Goals	Apps	Goals	Apps	Goals	Apps	Goals
Internacional	2011	Série A	4	0	—		—		—		—		4	0
Internacional	2012	Série A	2	0	2 (Note: Appearance(s) in Campeonato Gaúcho Série A)	0	—		0	0	—		4	0
Internacional	2013	Série A	—		2	0	—		—		—		2	0
Internacional	2015	Série A	3	0	—		1	0	—		—		4	0
Internacional	Total		9	0	4	0	1	0	0	0	—		14	0
Caxias (loan)	2013	Série C	18	0	—		—		—		—		18	0
Náutico (loan)	2014	Série B	3	0	9 (Note: Appearance(s) in Campeonato Pernambucano Série A)	0	3	0	—		5 (Note: Appearance(s) in Copa do Nordeste)	1	20	1
Sport Recife (loan)	2014	Série A	14	0	—		—		0	0	—		14	0
ABC (loan)	2015	Série B	—		2 (Note: Appearance(s) in Campeonato Potiguar)	0	—		—		—		2	0
Ceará	2016	Série B	3	0	—		—		—		1	0	4	0
Ferroviária	2017	Paulista	—		3 (Note: Appearance(s) in Campeonato Paulista Série A1)	0	—		—		—		3	0
EC São José	2018	Série D	—		0	0	—		—		—		0	0
Maringá	2019	Série D	—		1 (Note: Appearance(s) in Campeonato Paranaense)	0	—		—		—		1	0
Sergipe	2019	Série D	—		6 (Note: Appearance(s) in Campeonato Sergipano Série A1)	0	1	0	—		2	1	9	1
Jaraguá	2020	Goiano	—		9 (Note: Appearance(s) in Campeonato Goiano)	1	—		—		—		9	1
Novo Hamburgo	2020	Gaúcho	—		4	2	—		—		—		4	2
Ypiranga	2020	Série C	18	2	—		—		—		—		18	2
Ypiranga	2021	Série C	—		10	2	2	0	—		—		12	2
Ypiranga	Total		18	2	10	2	2	0	—		—		30	4
Sampaio Corrêa	2021	Série B	18	0	—		—		—		0	0	18	0
Figueirense	2022	Série C	18	0	13 (Note: Appearance(s) in Campeonato Catarinense)	1	2	1	—		—		33	2
Inter de Limeira	2023	Série D	—		14	0	—		—		—		14	0
Botafogo PB	2023	Série C	22	0	—		—		—		—		22	0
Inter de Limeira	2024	Série D	—		9	2	—		—		—		9	2
Ponte Preta	2024	Série B	4	0	—		—		—		—		4	0
Career Total			127	2	84	8	9	1	0	0	8	2	228	13
