= Pará (footballer, born 1995) =

Brazilian footballer

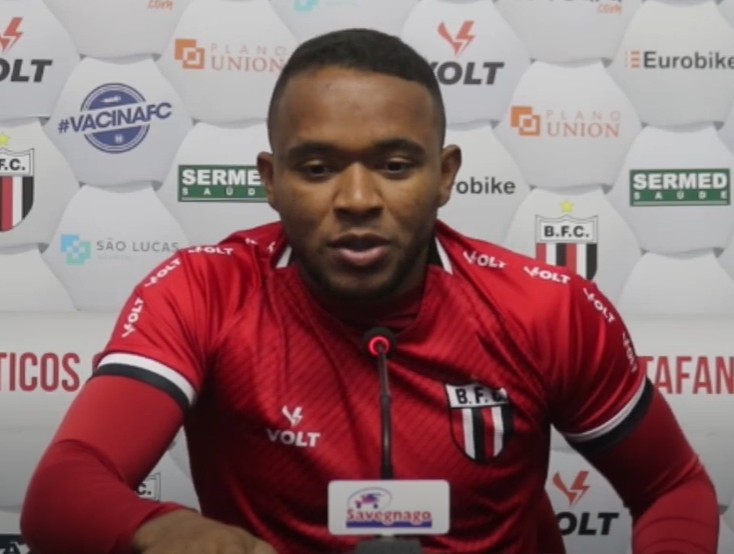
- Pará at Botafogo in 2021

Personal information
- Full name: Anderson Ferreira da Silva
- Date of birth: 23 August 1995 (age 31)
- Place of birth: Capanema, Brazil
- Height: 1.67 m (5 ft 5 1/2 in)
- Position: Left back

Team information
- Current team: São Bernardo
- Number: 6

Youth career
- Remo
- Bahia

Senior career*
Years	Team	Apps	(Gls)
2014	Bahia	20	(1)
2015–2016	Cruzeiro	11	(0)
2016	→ Atlético Paranaense (loan)	0	(0)
2016	→ Figueirense (loan)	9	(0)
2017	→ América Mineiro (loan)	14	(1)
2018	→ Guarani (loan)	26	(1)
2019	Botafogo-SP	44	(0)
2020–2021	Vegalta Sendai	13	(0)
2021	Botafogo-SP	28	(0)
2022	Mirassol	35	(4)
2023	CSA	3	(0)
2023–2024	Operário-PR	52	(2)
2025–	São Bernardo	76	(2)

International career
2014	Brazil U20	1	(0)
- * Club domestic league appearances and goals as of 18 November 2026

Anderson Ferreira da Silva (born 23 August 1995), commonly known as Pará, is a Brazilian footballer who plays for São Bernardo as a left back.

== Club career ==
Born in Capanema, Pará started his career at Remo as a forward, but due to his low height he later moved to the left back position, before joining Bahia. He made his debut with the latter's first team on 2 February 2014, featuring the last ten minutes in a 1–2 away loss against Santa Cruz for that year's Copa do Nordeste.

Pará made his Série A debut on 20 April, starting in a 1–2 home loss against Cruzeiro. He scored his first goal in the competition on 11 May, netting his team's only in a 1–1 home draw against fierce rivals Vitória.

On 28 January 2015 Pará moved to fellow league team Cruzeiro, signing a four-year deal and with Raposa buying 50% of his rights for R$500,000 fee.
