= Renato Palm =

Brazilian footballer (born 1991)

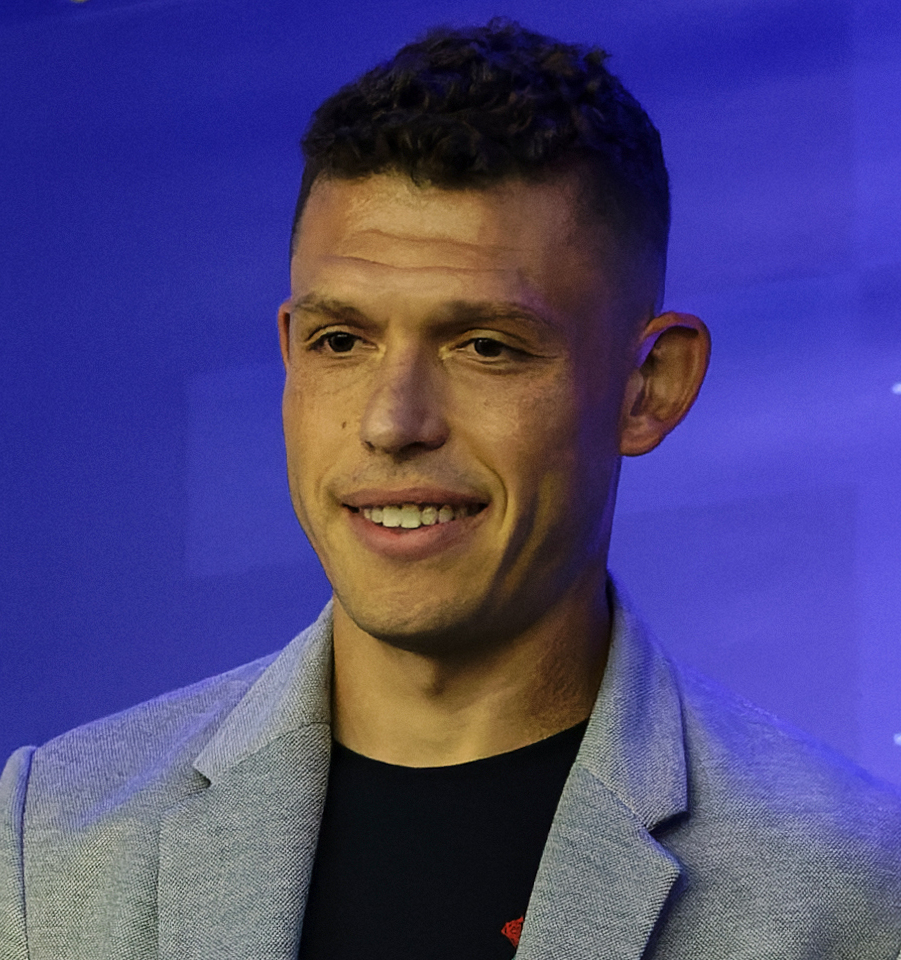
- Renato in 2023

Personal information
- Full name: Renato Palm da Silveira
- Date of birth: 14 October 1991 (age 35)
- Place of birth: Santo Augusto, Brazil
- Height: 1.90 m (6 ft 3 in)
- Position: Centre-back

Team information
- Current team: Novorizontino
- Number: 33

Youth career
- Internacional
- 2011: Paraná

Senior career*
Years	Team	Apps	(Gls)
2011	Cruzeiro-RS	0	(0)
2012	Santo Ângelo		
2012	São Luiz		
2013	Santo Ângelo	17	(1)
2013–2014	Luverdense	49	(0)
2015–2017	Ituano	1	(0)
2016	→ Avaí (loan)	1	(0)
2017	→ Guarani de Palhoça (loan)	15	(0)
2018	Santa Cruz	4	(0)
2018	CRAC	14	(1)
2019	Caldense	11	(0)
2019	Água Santa	0	(0)
2020	CRAC	10	(1)
2020	→ Penapolense (loan)	0	(0)
2020–2021	Aparecidense	37	(0)
2021–2022	Vila Nova	66	(0)
2022	Sepahan	12	(0)
2023–	Novorizontino	58	(2)
- * Club domestic league appearances and goals as of 11 August 2025

Renato Palm da Silveira (born 14 October 1991), sometimes known as just Renato, is a Brazilian professional footballer who plays as a centre-back for Novorizontino.

== Career ==
Renato playing for Sepahan in 2022

Renato joined Persian Gulf Pro League Sepahan in July 2022 on a two-year contract.
