= Pedro Bambú =

Brazilian footballer

Pedro Bambu
Personal information
- Full name: Pedro Gonzaga
- Date of birth: 6 June 1987 (age 39)
- Place of birth: Pindaré-Mirim, Brazil
- Height: 1.75 m (5 ft 9 in)
- Positions: Defensive midfielder; right-back

Team information
- Current team: Tupy

Senior career*
Years	Team	Apps	(Gls)
2008–2009	Nacional-MA		
2009	Bacabal		
2010	Tiradentes-CE	19	(1)
2010	Nacional-MA		
2011–2013	Tiradentes-CE	62	(1)
2011	→ Paraíba (loan)	0	(0)
2011	→ Santa Quitéria (loan)	0	(0)
2013–2016	Atlético Goianiense	139	(6)
2017–2018	Goiás	68	(4)
2018–2019	Atlético Goianiense	69	(2)
2020–2023	Vila Nova	119	(3)
2023	Iporá	13	(0)
2023	Ceilândia	18	(0)
2023	Anapolina	10	(0)
2024	Tupy	0	(0)
2025	Iporá Esporte Clube		
- * Club domestic league appearances and goals

Pedro Gonzaga, commonly known as Pedro Bambu is a Brazilian professional footballer who plays as a defensive midfielder or right-back for Campeonato Goiano Second Division club Iporá Esporte Clube.

== Career ==
He rejoined Atlético Goianiense for a second spell in June 2018, having made over a hundred Campeonato Brasileiro Série B appearances for the club between 2013 and 2016, and spending two seasons with local rivals Goiás. He previously played in 2013 Campeonato Brasileiro Série D for Tiradentes-CE, who were eventually knocked out at the quarter-final stage.
