= Bruno Furlan =

Brazilian footballer (born 1992)

Personal information
- Full name: Bruno de Oliveira Furlan
- Date of birth: 9 July 1992 (age 34)
- Place of birth: Campo Grande, Brazil
- Height: 1.80 m (5 ft 11 in)
- Position: Winger

Youth career
- –2010: Atlético Paranaense

Senior career*
Years	Team	Apps	(Gls)
2010–2017	Atlético Paranaense	8	(1)
2010–2011	→ Dinamo Minsk (loan)	32	(14)
2014	→ Náutico (loan)	16	(2)
2015	→ Joinville (loan)	0	(0)
2016	→ ABC (loan)	0	(0)
2017	→ América de Natal (loan)	0	(0)
2018	Vitebsk	18	(4)
- * Club domestic league appearances and goals as of 31 December 2018

Bruno de Oliveira Furlan (born 9 July 1992) is a Brazilian former professional footballer who played as a winger.

== Career ==
Furlan played for Dinamo Minsk on loan from Atlético Paranaense.

== Career statistics ==
(Correct as of 16 October 2010)

Club	Season	State League		Brazilian Série A		Copa do Brasil		Copa Libertadores		Copa Sudamericana		Total	
Club	Season	Apps	Goals	Apps	Goals	Apps	Goals	Apps	Goals	Apps	Goals	Apps	Goals
Atlético Paranaense	2010	3	1	0	0	-	-	-	-	-	-	3	1
Total		3	1	0	0	-	-	-	-	-	-	3	1
