= Paulinho (footballer, born May 1989) =

Brazilian footballer

Personal information
- Full name: Paulo Sérgio de Oliveira
- Date of birth: 10 May 1989 (age 37)
- Place of birth: Francisco Morato, Brazil
- Height: 1.72 m (5 ft 8 in)
- Position: Defensive midfielder

Team information
- Current team: Santa Cruz
- Number: 8

Youth career
- Internacional

Senior career*
Years	Team	Apps	(Gls)
2008–2010	Internacional	0	(0)
2009	→ Figueirense (loan)	27	(0)
2010	→ Guarani (loan)	5	(0)
2011	Botafogo-SP	0	(0)
2011	Ponte Preta	0	(0)
2012	Guaratinguetá	0	(0)
2013–2014	Ituano	0	(0)
2014	Náutico	25	(3)
2015	Ponte Preta	4	(0)
2015	Criciúma	11	(0)
2016	Paysandu	1	(0)
2017	Mirassol	0	(0)
2017	Criciúma	6	(0)
2017	Atlético Goianiense	20	(2)
2018	Mirassol	0	(0)
2018	Ponte Preta	25	(2)
2019	São Bento	22	(0)
2020–	Santa Cruz	25	(2)
- * Club domestic league appearances and goals as of 09:57, 7 September 2020 (UTC)

Paulo Sérgio de Oliveira (born 10 May 1989), commonly known as Paulinho, is a Brazilian footballer who plays as a defensive midfielder for Santa Cruz.

== Club career ==
Born in Francisco Morato, São Paulo, Paulinho was an Internacional youth graduate. He made his first team – and Série A – debut on 30 November 2008, coming on as a substitute for Rosinei in a 1–0 home win against Cruzeiro.

On 12 May 2009, Paulinho was loaned to Figueirense in the Série B, until the end of the year. The following February, he moved to Guarani also in a temporary deal.

On 19 July 2011, after a short stint at Botafogo-SP, Paulinho joined Ponte Preta. After appearing rarely, he signed for Guaratinguetá in February of the following year.

On 19 December 2012, Paulinho agreed to a contract with Ituano. A regular starter, he was crowned champions of the Campeonato Paulista in 2014, after defeating Santos.

On 8 May 2014, Paulinho signed for Náutico, and contributed with three goals in 25 appearances for the side. On 23 December, he returned to Ponte Preta.

Paulinho again featured sparingly for the club, and was subsequently released; on 9 July 2015, he joined Criciúma. The following 4 January he moved to Paysandu, but cut ties with the club on 6 June after appearing rarely.

Paulinho started the 2017 campaign with Mirassol, but returned to Criciúma in April. On 5 July, however, he signed with Atlético Goianiense until the end of the year.

An immediate mainstay at Dragão, Paulinho scored his first goal in the main category of Brazilian football on 23 July 2017, netting the equalizer in a 1–1 home draw against Botafogo.

Paulinho signed for São Bento on 17 December 2018.

== Career statistics ==
As of 16 September 2017

Club	Season	League			State League		Cup		Continental		Other		Total	
Club	Season	Division	Apps	Goals	Apps	Goals	Apps	Goals	Apps	Goals	Apps	Goals	Apps	Goals
Internacional	2008	Série A	1	0	0	0	0	0	—		—		1	0
Internacional	2009	Série A	0	0	1	0	0	0	—		—		1	0
Internacional	2010	Série A	0	0	3	0	0	0	—		—		3	0
Internacional	Subtotal		1	0	4	0	0	0	—		—		5	0
Figueirense (loan)	2009	Série B	27	0	—		—		—		—		27	0
Guarani (loan)	2010	Série B	5	0	5	0	3	0	—		—		13	0
Botafogo-SP	2011	Paulista	—		10	2	—		—		—		10	2
Ponte Preta	2011	Série B	0	0	—		—		—		—		0	0
Guaratinguetá	2012	Série B	0	0	1	0	—		—		—		1	0
Ituano	2013	Paulista	—		12	0	—		—		16 (Note: Appearance(s) in Copa Paulista)	1	28	1
Ituano	2014	Paulista	—		18	0	—		—		—		18	0
Ituano	Subtotal		—		30	0	—		—		16	1	46	1
Náutico	2014	Série B	25	3	—		—		—		—		25	3
Ponte Preta	2015	Série A	4	0	6	0	2	0	—		—		12	0
Criciúma	2015	Série B	11	0	—		—		—		—		11	0
Paysandu	2016	Série B	1	0	2	0	1	0	—		2 (Note: Appearance(s) in Copa Verde)	0	6	0
Mirassol	2017	Paulista	—		13	0	—		—		—		13	0
Criciúma	2017	Série B	6	0	—		—		—		—		6	0
Atlético Goianiense	2017	Série A	11	2	—		—		—		—		11	2
Career total			91	5	71	2	6	0	0	0	18	1	186	8
