= Danrlei (footballer, born 1994) =

Brazilian footballer

Personal information
- Full name: Danrlei Rosa dos Santos
- Date of birth: 1 August 1994 (age 32)
- Place of birth: São Luiz Gonzaga, Brazil
- Height: 1.86 m (6 ft 1 in)
- Position: Centre-back

Team information
- Current team: Ponte Preta

Youth career
- Juventude
- Atletico Paranaense
- –2013: Joinville

Senior career*
Years	Team	Apps	(Gls)
2013–2017	Joinville	68	(2)
2014	→ Mogi Mirim (loan)	11	(1)
2017	→ ABC (loan)	12	(0)
2018	Madureira	6	(0)
2018	ABC	9	(0)
2019	Cuiabá	10	(0)
2019	Caxias	0	(0)
2020	Vila Nova	12	(0)
2021	Grêmio Anápolis	12	(1)
2021–2023	Sanjoanense	49	(2)
2023–2024	Leixões	29	(2)
2025	CRAC	11	(0)
2025–	Ponte Preta	0	(0)
- * Club domestic league appearances and goals as of 5 March 2025

Danrlei Rosa dos Santos (born 1 August 1994) is a Brazilian professional footballer who plays as a centre-back for Ponte Preta.

== Career ==
=== Joinville ===
Danrlei became a professional in 2014 and played in the youth of Atletico Paranaense before joining Joinville. He made his league debut against CA Metropolitano on 30 January 2014. He scored his first goal for the club against Vila Nova on 2 August 2016, scoring in the 15th minute.

=== Mogi Mirim ===
Danrlei made his league debut against EC Juventude on 3 August 2014. He scored his first goal for the club against Guaratinguetá on 9 August 2014, scoring in the 77th minute.

=== ABC ===
Danrlei made his league debut against Figueirense on 23 September 2017.

=== Vila Nova ===
Danrlei made his league debut against Anápolis on 23 January 2020.

=== Grêmio Anápolis ===
Danrlei made his league debut against Anápolis on 28 February 2021. He scored his first goal for the club against CRAC on 1 April 2021, scoring in the 2nd minute.

=== Sanjoanense ===
Danrlei made his league debut against Pevidém on 20 August 2021. He cored his first goal for the club against São João Ver on 22 January 2023, scoring in the 54th minute.

=== Leixões ===
Danrlei made his league debut against Santa Clara on 21 August 2023. He scored his first goal for the club against Benfica B on 10 February 2024, scoring in the 83rd minute.

=== CRAC ===
At the end of December 2024 it was confirmed, that Danrlei had signed with Brazilian club CRAC.

== Career statistics ==
As of match played 23 February 2025

Appearances and goals by club, season and competition
Club	Season	League			State league		National cup (Note: Includes Copa do Brasil, Taça de Portugal)		Continental		Other		Total	
Club	Season	Division	Apps	Goals	Apps	Goals	Apps	Goals	Apps	Goals	Apps	Goals	Apps	Goals
Joinville	2014	Série B	0	0	3 (Note: Appearance(s) in Campeonato Catarinense)	0	0	0	—		—		3	0
Joinville	2015	Série A	10	0	6	0	0	0	1 (Note: Appearance(s) in Copa Sudamericana)	0	—		17	0
Joinville	2016	Série B	16	2	9	0	2	0	—		—		27	2
Joinville	2017	Série C	11	0	13	0	5	0	—		—		29	0
Joinville	Total		37	2	31	0	7	0	1	0	—		76	2
Mogi Mirim (loan)	2014	Série C	11	1	0	0	—		—		—		11	1
ABC (loan)	2017	Série B	12	0	0	0	0	0	—		0	0	12	0
Madureira	2018	Série D	0	0	6 (Note: Appearance(s) in Campeonato Carioca)	0	1	0	—		—		7	0
ABC	2018	Série C	9	0	0	0	0	0	—		2 (Note: Appearance(s) in Copa do Nordeste)	0	11	0
Cuiabá	2019	Série B	0	0	8 (Note: Appearance(s) in Campeonato Mato-Grossense)	0	2	0	—		—		10	0
Caxias	2019	Série D	0	0	0	0	—		—		—		0	0
Vila Nova	2020	Série C	2	0	10 (Note: Appearance(s) in Campeonato Goiano)	0	2	0	—		3 (Note: Appearance(s) in Copa Verde)	0	17	0
Grêmio Anápolis	2021	—			12	1	—		—		—		12	1
Sanjoanense	2021-22	Liga 3	25	0	—		0	0	—		—		25	0
Sanjoanense	2022-23	Liga 3	24	2	—		2	0	—		—		26	2
Sanjoanense	Total		49	2	—		2	0	—		—		51	2
Leixões	2023-24	Liga Portugal 2	29	2	—		1	0	—		1 (Note: Appearance(s) in Taça da Liga)	0	31	2
Leixões	2024-25	Liga Portugal 2	0	0	—		0	0	—		0	0	0	0
Leixões	Total		29	2	—		1	0	—		1	0	31	2
CRAC	2025	—			9	0	—		—		—		9	0
Career total			149	7	76	1	15	0	1	0	6	0	247	8

== Honours ==
Cuiabá

- Campeonato Mato-Grossense: 2019

Vila Nova

- Campeonato Brasileiro Série C: 2020

Grêmio Anápolis

- Campeonato Goiano: 2021
