= Izaldo =

Brazilian footballer

Personal information
- Full name: Izaldo Braz Da Silva Junior
- Date of birth: 3 June 1993 (age 33)
- Place of birth: Brazil
- Height: 1.70 m (5 ft 7 in)
- Position: Left back

Team information
- Current team: Villa Nova

Youth career
- Náutico

Senior career*
Years	Team	Apps	(Gls)
2013–2014	Náutico	12	(0)
2015	Icasa	2	(0)
2015	Novo Hamburgo		
2016	Confiança	12	(0)
2016	Zimbru Chișinău	2	(0)
2017	Jacuipense	0	(0)
2017	Anápolis	4	(0)
2018–2019	Salgueiro	20	(0)
2019	Makedonija	16	(0)
2020	URT	7	(0)
2020–	Villa Nova	0	(0)
- * Club domestic league appearances and goals as of 20:24, 7 October 2020 (UTC)

Izaldo Braz Da Silva Junior (born 3 June 1993), known as Izaldo, is a Brazilian footballer who plays for Villa Nova, as a defender.
