= Zeca (footballer, born 1990) =

Brazilian footballer

Personal information
- Full name: David da Silva Lima
- Date of birth: July 25, 1990 (age 36)
- Place of birth: Rio de Janeiro, Brazil
- Height: 1.80 m (5 ft 11 in)
- Position: Left back

Team information
- Current team: Santa Cruz
- Number: 21

Youth career
- 2010: Madureira

Senior career*
Years	Team	Apps	(Gls)
2010–2013	Madureira	45	(2)
2013	Novo Hamburgo	2	(0)
2014	Guarany de Sobral	12	(1)
2014–	Santa Cruz	9	(0)
- * Club domestic league appearances and goals

David da Silva Lima (born July 25, 1990 in Rio de Janeiro), known as Zeca, is a Brazilian football left back who currently plays for Santa Cruz Futebol Clube.
