= Marcone =

Marcone is a family name of Italian origin. It may refer to:

== People ==
- Iván Marcone (born 1980), Argentine footballer
- Richard Gabriel Marcone (born 1993), Romania-born Italian footballer
- Vincent Marcone (born 1973), Canadian web designer, illustrator and musician
- Marcone Amaral Costa (born 1978), Brazil-born footballer naturalized Qatar

Fictional

- "Gentleman" Johnny Marcone, fictional character in the novel The Dresden Files
- Sheldon "Shelly" Marcone, fictional character in the film The Last Boy Scout

== Geology ==
- Selve Marcone, comune (municipality) in the Province of Biella in the Italian region of Piedmont
