= Arena Joinville =

Multi-use stadium in Santa Catarina, Brazil

Coordinates: 26.316667°S 48.833611°W

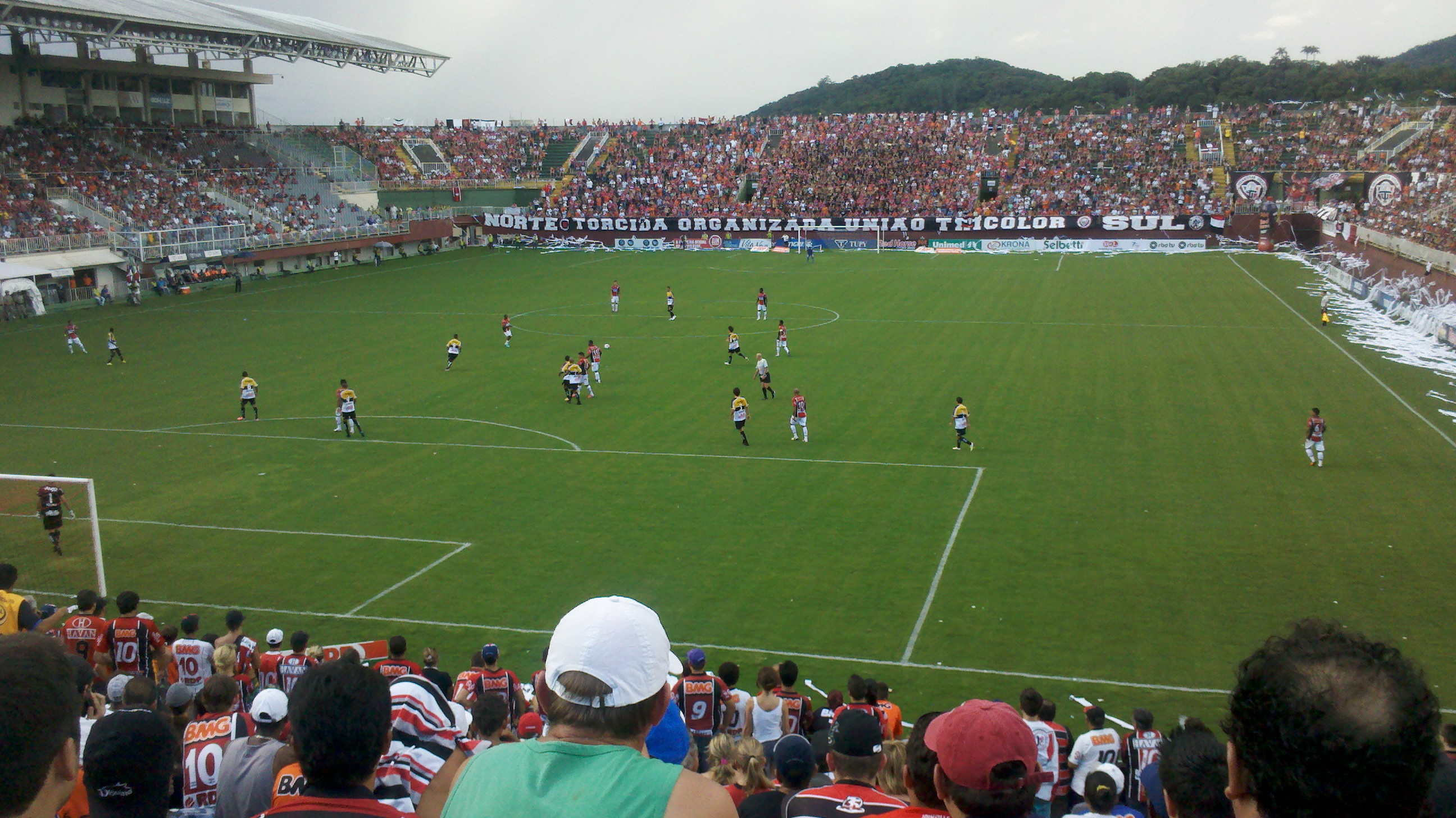
- Sisbrace
- Interactive map of Arena Joinville
- Location: Joinville, Santa Catarina state, Brazil
- Owner: Joinville City Hall
- Capacity: 22,400
- Surface: Grass

Construction
- Opened: September 25, 2004

Tenant
- Joinville Esporte Clube (2004–Present)

Arena Joinville is a multi-use stadium located in Joinville, Santa Catarina, Brazil. It hosts football matches as well as Brazilian and international shows. The stadium is used mainly for football matches and hosts the home matches of Joinville Esporte Clube. It is located at Bucarein neighborhood, near Boa Vista and Guanabara neighborhoods. Arena Joinville is one of the Brazil's most modern football stadiums, and its design is inspired by European football arenas, such as the Amsterdam ArenA. The stadium is owned by the Joinville City Hall.

== History ==
Arena Joinville was inaugurated on September 25, 2004. The stadium's inaugural match was a friendly match, played on that day, when Masters All-Stars beat All-Stars of Joinville 3-1. The first stadium goal was scored by Masters' player Donizete Pantera. The stadium attendance record was also in the inauguration match. 15,000 people watched the match.

The stadium's capacity, which was 15,000 people, was expanded to 22,400 people on June 26, 2007, and will be expanded to 30,000 (24,000 seated) in 2007. The estimated budget for the expansion is R$7 million.

== Shopping Arena ==
A shopping mall is being constructed inside the stadium, and it will be composed of an estimated number of more than a hundred stores, turning it into one of the biggest shopping malls in the city.
