= Rafael Donato (footballer) =

Brazilian footballer

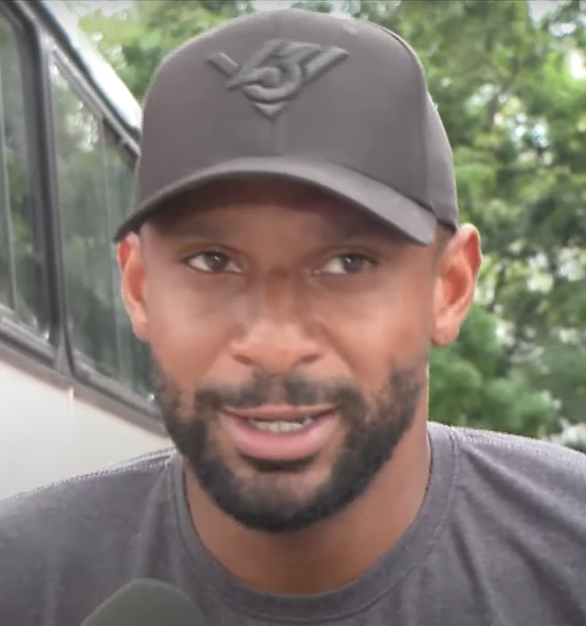
- Donato in 2023

Personal information
- Full name: Rafael Ferreira Donato
- Date of birth: 17 March 1989 (age 37)
- Place of birth: Rio de Janeiro, Brazil
- Height: 1.93 m (6 ft 4 in)
- Position: Centre-back

Team information
- Current team: Guarani FC
- Number: 5

Youth career
- 2002–2007: Botafogo
- 2008: Palmeiras
- 2008–2009: Audax Rio

Senior career*
Years	Team	Apps	(Gls)
2009–2011	Audax Rio	7	(0)
2012	Bahia	32	(6)
2012–2017	Cruzeiro	11	(2)
2013	→ Bahia (loan)	10	(1)
2014	→ Criciúma (loan)	5	(1)
2015–2016	→ Joinville (loan)	39	(4)
2017–2018	União da Madeira	2	(0)
2018–2019	Al-Kawkab	0	(0)
2020	Brasiliense	7	(1)
2020–2023	Vila Nova	160	(17)
2024–2025	Grêmio Novorizontino	59	(4)
2026–	Guarani FC	13	(0)
- * Club domestic league appearances and goals as of 10 November 2026

Rafael Ferreira Donato (born 17 March 1989) is a Brazilian footballer who plays as a centre-back for Guarani FC.

== Career ==
On 24 November 2017, having gone nearly a year since playing his last game for Joinville, Donato joined LigaPro side União da Madeira on a deal until the end of the season.

== Honours ==
Audax Rio

- Copa Rio: 2010

Bahia

- Campeonato Baiano: 2012
