= Zé Roberto (footballer, born 1993) =

Brazilian footballer

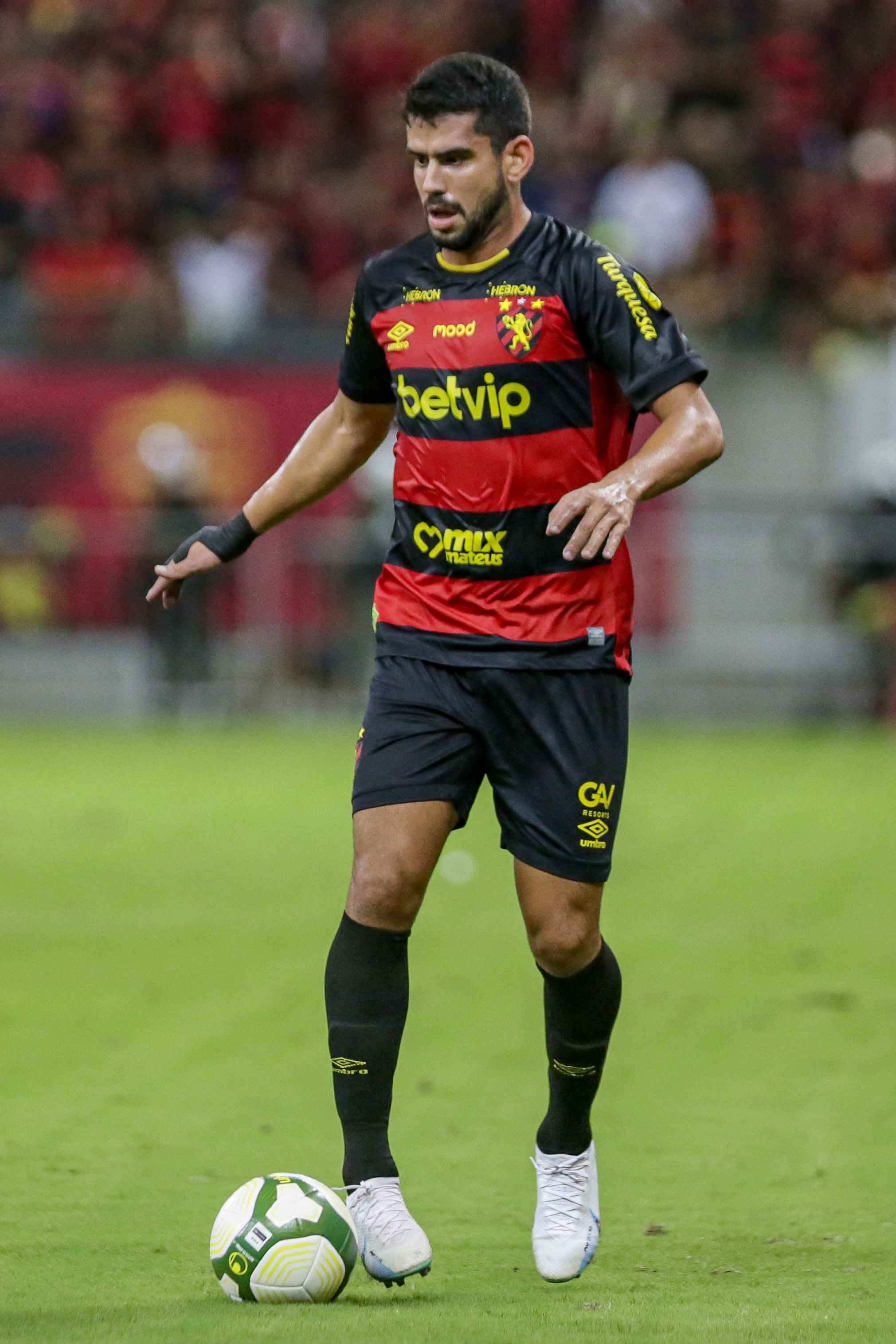

Personal information
- Full name: José Roberto Assunção de Araújo Filho
- Date of birth: 14 September 1993 (age 33)
- Place of birth: Teixeira de Freitas, Brazil
- Height: 1.80 m (5 ft 11 in)
- Position: Forward

Team information
- Current team: Mirassol

Youth career
- 2009–2014: Bahia

Senior career*
| Years | Team | Apps | (Gls) |
| 2012–2018 | Bahia | 42 | (7) |
| 2012 | → Bahia de Feira (loan) | 1 | (0) |
| 2014 | → Salgueiro (loan) | 11 | (2) |
| 2016 | → Ponte Preta (loan) | 5 | (0) |
| 2017 | → Mirassol (loan) | 14 | (5) |
| 2017 | → Criciúma (loan) | 6 | (1) |
| 2017 | → Santos (loan) | 0 | (0) |
| 2018 | → Mirassol (loan) | 11 | (3) |
| 2018 | → São Bento (loan) | 8 | (2) |
| 2018 | Daegu FC | 11 | (3) |
| 2019–2020 | Mirassol | 9 | (4) |
| 2019 | → São Bento (loan) | 33 | (14) |
| 2020 | → Atlético Goianiense (loan) | 1 | (1) |
| 2020 | → Baniyas (loan) | 4 | (1) |
| 2020 | → Ponte Preta (loan) | 6 | (0) |
| 2020–2021 | Atlético Goianiense | 70 | (18) |
| 2022–2024 | Ceará | 23 | (3) |
| 2023 | → Mirassol (loan) | 13 | (4) |
| 2023 | → Coritiba (loan) | 10 | (1) |
| 2023 | → Mirassol (loan) | 19 | (8) |
| 2024 | → Sport Recife (loan) | 39 | (9) |
| 2025–2026 | Sport Recife | 14 | (1) |
| 2026– | Mirassol | 0 | (0) |
- * Club domestic league appearances and goals as of 16 April 2026

José Roberto Assunção de Araújo Filho (born 14 September 1993), known as Zé Roberto, is a Brazilian footballer who plays as a forward for Mirassol.

== Club career ==
Born in Teixeira de Freitas, Bahia, Zé Roberto represented Bahia as a youth. In 2012 he was loaned to Bahia de Feira, and made his senior debut on 12 April of that year by coming on as a substitute in a 5–2 home loss against São Paulo, for the season's Copa do Brasil.

Upon returning, he only began to feature with the first team in 2014, but was loaned to Série C club Salgueiro on 30 June of that year. He started to appear regularly in the following campaign, as his side eventually missed out promotion.

On 14 September 2016, Zé Roberto was loaned to Série A club Ponte Preta, with Renê Júnior moving in the opposite direction. He made his debut in the category on 1 October, replacing Ravanelli in a 2–1 home loss against Atlético Mineiro.

Zé Roberto subsequently served loan stints at Mirassol, Criciúma and Santos' B-team during the 2017 season.

Zé Roberto began the 2018 campaign back at Mirassol, before joining São Bento on 14 March. He left the latter on 30 May to move abroad with South Korean side Daegu FC, but featured sparingly.

On 8 February 2019, Zé Roberto returned to Mirassol for a third spell, now in a permanent contract. He returned to São Bento on 27 March, and was the club's top goalscorer in the 2019 Série B with 14 goals, and third-best overall.

On 6 January 2020, Zé Roberto agreed to a one-year loan deal with Atlético Goianiense in the top tier, but moved abroad to Baniyas in the United Arab Emirates just 19 days later. He returned to Mirassol on 6 July, and scored twice in his first game back at the club to knock out São Paulo of the quarterfinals of the 2020 Campeonato Paulista.

On 6 August 2020, Zé Roberto moved to second division side Ponte Preta. On 24 September, he returned to Atlético Goianiense on a permanent three-year contract, mainly as a replacement to Renato Kayzer.

On 29 April 2021, Zé Roberto scored the winner in a 1–0 away success over Palestino for the year's Copa Sudamericana; his goal was Atlético's first international goal of their history.

== Career statistics ==
As of 11 April 2023

| Club | Season | League | | | State League | | Cup | | Continental | | Other | | Total | |
| Club | Season | Division | Apps | Goals | Apps | Goals | Apps | Goals | Apps | Goals | Apps | Goals | Apps | Goals |
|---|---|---|---|---|---|---|---|---|---|---|---|---|---|---|
| Bahia de Feira | 2012 | Baiano | — | | 1 | 0 | 1 | 0 | — | | — | | 2 | 0 |
| Bahia | 2013 | Série A | 0 | 0 | 0 | 0 | 0 | 0 | — | | — | | 0 | 0 |
| Bahia | 2014 | Série A | 0 | 0 | 1 | 0 | 0 | 0 | — | | 2 (Note: Appearance(s) in Copa do Nordeste) | 0 | 3 | 0 |
| Bahia | 2015 | Série B | 16 | 2 | 6 | 1 | 4 | 1 | 2 (Note: Appearance(s) in Copa Sudamericana) | 0 | 9 | 0 | 37 | 4 |
| Bahia | 2016 | Série B | 12 | 3 | 7 | 1 | 4 | 1 | — | | 7 | 1 | 30 | 6 |
| Bahia | Total | | 28 | 5 | 14 | 2 | 8 | 2 | 2 | 0 | 18 | 1 | 70 | 10 |
| Salgueiro (loan) | 2014 | Série C | 11 | 2 | — | | — | | — | | — | | 11 | 2 |
| Ponte Preta (loan) | 2016 | Série A | 5 | 0 | — | | — | | — | | — | | 5 | 0 |
| Mirassol (loan) | 2017 | Paulista | — | | 14 | 5 | — | | — | | — | | 14 | 5 |
| Criciúma (loan) | 2017 | Série B | 6 | 1 | — | | — | | — | | — | | 6 | 1 |
| Santos (loan) | 2017 | Série A | 0 | 0 | — | | — | | — | | 8 (Note: Appearance(s) in Copa Paulista) | 2 | 8 | 2 |
| Mirassol (loan) | 2018 | Paulista | — | | 11 | 3 | — | | — | | — | | 11 | 3 |
| São Bento (loan) | 2018 | Série B | 8 | 2 | — | | — | | — | | — | | 8 | 2 |
| Daegu FC | 2018 | K League 1 | 11 | 3 | — | | 1 | 2 | — | | — | | 12 | 5 |
| Mirassol | 2019 | Paulista | — | | 7 | 2 | — | | — | | — | | 7 | 2 |
| Mirassol | 2020 | Série D | 0 | 0 | 2 | 2 | — | | — | | — | | 2 | 2 |
| Mirassol | Total | | 0 | 0 | 9 | 4 | — | | — | | — | | 9 | 4 |
| São Bento (loan) | 2019 | Série B | 33 | 14 | — | | — | | — | | — | | 33 | 14 |
| Atlético Goianiense (loan) | 2020 | Série A | 0 | 0 | 1 | 1 | 0 | 0 | — | | — | | 1 | 1 |
| Baniyas (loan) | 2019–20 | UAE Pro League | 4 | 1 | — | | — | | — | | — | | 4 | 1 |
| Ponte Preta (loan) | 2020 | Série B | 6 | 0 | — | | 3 | 1 | — | | — | | 9 | 1 |
| Atlético Goianiense | 2020 | Série A | 25 | 3 | 4 | 4 | — | | — | | — | | 29 | 7 |
| Atlético Goianiense | 2021 | Série A | 34 | 6 | 7 | 5 | 6 | 3 | 6 | 2 | — | | 53 | 16 |
| Atlético Goianiense | Total | | 59 | 9 | 11 | 9 | 6 | 3 | 6 | 2 | — | | 82 | 23 |
| Ceará | 2022 | Série A | 21 | 2 | 2 | 1 | 3 | 0 | 6 | 2 | 8 | 1 | 40 | 6 |
| Mirassol (loan) | 2023 | Série B | 0 | 0 | 13 | 4 | — | | — | | — | | 13 | 4 |
| Coritiba (loan) | 2023 | Série A | 0 | 0 | — | | 0 | 0 | — | | — | | 0 | 0 |
| Career total | | | 192 | 39 | 76 | 29 | 22 | 8 | 14 | 4 | 34 | 4 | 339 | 84 |

== Honours ==
Atlético Goianiense

- Campeonato Goiano: 2020
