= Marcos Vinícius (footballer, born 1994) =

Brazilian footballer

Personal information
- Full name: Marcos Vinícius de Jesus Araújo
- Date of birth: 26 December 1994 (age 31)
- Place of birth: Marabá, Brazil
- Height: 1.77 m (5 ft 10 in)
- Position: Attacking midfielder

Youth career
- Corinthians
- Bahia
- 2010–2012: Náutico

Senior career*
Years	Team	Apps	(Gls)
2011–2015	Náutico	62	(7)
2014–2015	Cruzeiro (loan)	0	(0)
2015–2017	Cruzeiro	38	(3)
2017–2020	Botafogo	43	(7)
2019	Chapecoense (loan)	1	(0)
2020	Botafogo-SP (loan)	1	(0)
2020	Náutico	5	(0)
2021	Santa Cruz	3	(0)
2022–2023	Visakha	23	(6)
- * Club domestic league appearances and goals as of 19:52, 4 July 2021 (UTC)

Marcos Vinícius de Jesus Araújo (born 24 December 1994), known as Marcos Vinícius, is a Brazilian footballer who plays as an attacking midfielder.

== Club career ==
Marcos Vinícius was born in Marabá, Pará, and after short spells at Corinthians and Bahia, joined Náutico in 2010, aged 15. He subsequently graduated with the latter and made his professional debut on 14 September 2011, coming on as a second-half substitute for Lenon in a 1–2 away loss against Bragantino for the Série B championship.

Marcos Vinícius made his Série A debut on 29 May 2013, again from the bench in a 0–3 home loss against Vitória. He scored his first goal in the category on 2 June, netting a last-minute equalizer in a 2–2 home draw against Portuguesa.

On 10 November 2014 Marcos Vinícius was loaned to Cruzeiro until December 2015, with a buyout clause. On 4 April of the following year, after only appearing with the side in Campeonato Mineiro, Raposa bought 50% of his rights.

== Honours ==
=== Club ===
Botafogo

- Campeonato Carioca: 2018
