= Jaraguá Esporte Clube =

Jaraguá
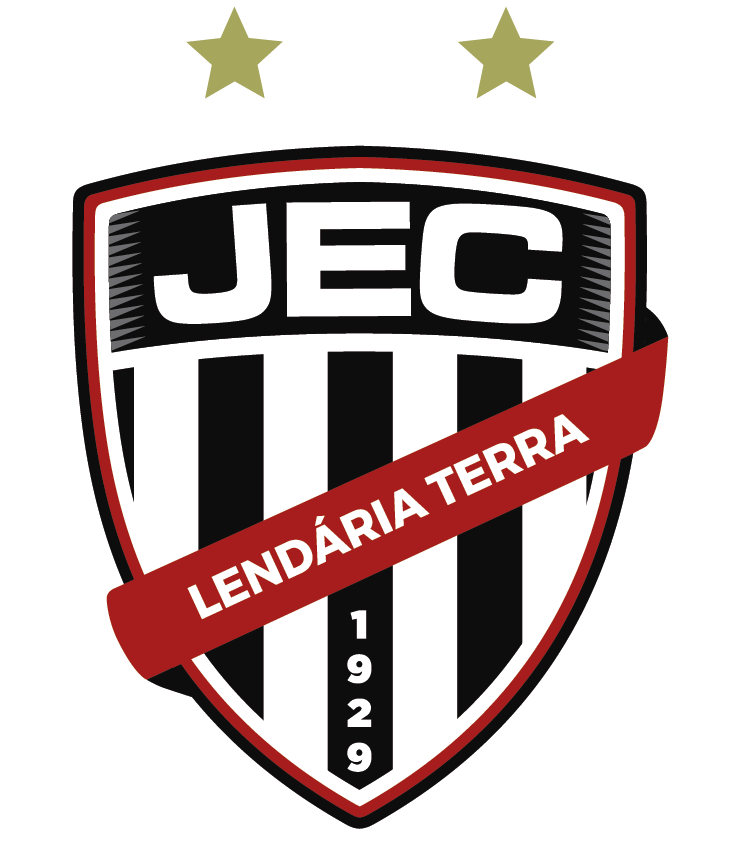
- Full name: Jaraguá Esporte Clube
- Founded: 2 February 1929; 96 years ago
- Ground: Amintas de Freitas
- Capacity: 4,000
- Chairman: Silvano Martins
- Manager: Ariel Mamede
- 2024: Goiano Segunda Divisão, 8th of 8 (relegated)
Home colours	Away colours

Jaraguá Esporte Clube, usually known simply as Jaraguá, is a Brazilian football club from Jaraguá, Goiás.

== History ==
Founded on 2 February 1929, Jaraguá only played amateur championships until 2001, when it first appeared in the second division of the Campeonato Goiano. The club later went back to inactivity until 2007, when it appeared once in the third division and finishing last in its group.

Back to an active status for the 2017 third division, Jaraguá won the competition unbeaten, suffering only one goal during the whole tournament. In the following year, the club narrowly avoided relegation in the second tier.

In October 2019, the club was crowned champions of the year's second division, achieving a first-ever promotion to the top tier.

== Honours ==
- Campeonato Goiano Segunda Divisão: 2019
- Campeonato Goiano Terceira Divisão: 2017
