= Iporá Esporte Clube =

Iporá
- Full name: Iporá Esporte Clube
- Nicknames: IPEC; Lobo-Guará
- Founded: 1 January 2000; 26 years ago
- Ground: Ferreirão, Iporá
- Capacity: 6,520
- Chairman: Valdivino Pains
- Head coach: Everton Goiano
- League: Campeonato Goiano Terceira Divisão
- 2025: Goiano Segunda Divisão, 8th of 8 (relegated)
Home colours	Away colours	Third colours

Iporá Esporte Clube, usually known simply as Iporá, is a Brazilian football club from Iporá, Goiás.

== History ==
Founded on 1 January 2000, Iporá immediately joined Campeonato Goiano's second tier and ceased activity after suffering relegation in the following year. It returned to action in 2004, now in the third division, and achieved promotion after finishing second.

The club subsequently spent the following campaigns in the second level, and achieved promotion to the first division in 2016, again finishing second. In the following year, the club finished fifth, thus qualifying to the 2018 Campeonato Brasileiro Série D.
