= Goianésia Esporte Clube =

Goianésia
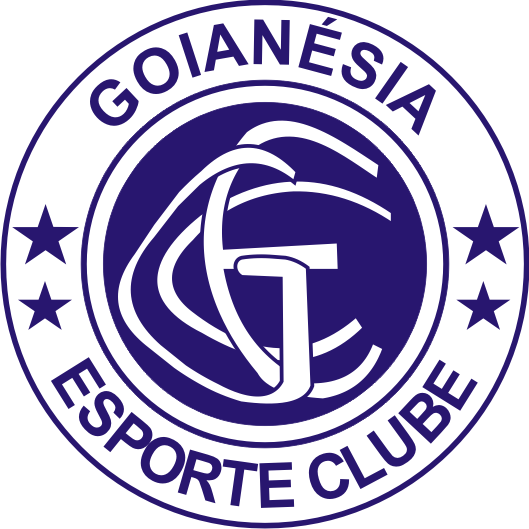
- Full name: Goianésia Esporte Clube
- Nickname: Azulão do Vale
- Founded: 28 March 1955; 71 years ago
- Ground: Estádio Valdeir José de Oliveira
- Capacity: 3,500
- President: Gustavo Carvalho
- Head coach: Jorge Saran
- League: Campeonato Goiano Segunda Divisão
- 2025 2025: Série D, 61st of 64; Goiano, 11th of 12 (relegated)
Home colors	Away colors

Goianésia Esporte Clube, commonly known as Goianésia, is a Brazilian football club based in Goianésia, Goiás state.

== History ==
The club was founded on 28 March 1955. They won the Campeonato Goiano Série B in 1985.

== Honours ==
- Campeonato Goiano
  - Runners-up (1): 2020
- Campeonato Goiano Second Division:
  - Winners (1): 1985

== Stadium ==
Goianésia Esporte Clube play their home games at Estádio Valdeir José de Oliveira. The stadium has a maximum capacity of 3,500 people.
