= Grêmio Esportivo Anápolis =

Brazilian association football club based in Anápolis, Goiás, Brazil

Grêmio Anápolis
- Full name: Grêmio Esportivo Anápolis
- Nickname: Azulão Anapolino (Big Blue from Anápolis)
- Founded: 15 March 1999; 26 years ago as Grêmio Esportivo Inhumense; 4 September 2005; 20 years ago as Grêmio Esportivo Anápolis
- Ground: Estádio Jonas Duarte
- Capacity: 20,000
- President: Maxwell Teles Guimarães
- Head coach: Dema
- League: Campeonato Goiano Segunda Divisão
- 2025: Goiano Segunda Divisão, 6th of 8
- Website: gremioanapolis.com.br
Home colors	Away colors

Grêmio Esportivo Anápolis, commonly referred to as Grêmio Anápolis, is a Brazilian professional club based in Anápolis, Goiás founded on 3 March 1999. It competes in the Campeonato Goiano, the top flight of the Goiás state football league.

== History ==
The club was founded on 15 March 1999 as Grêmio Esportivo Inhumense. In 2000 they were promoted to Campeonato Goiano. In 2005 they finished 4th and qualified for the 2005 Campeonato Brasileiro Série C, when they were eliminated in the first stage of the competition.

== Stadium ==
Grêmio Esportivo Anápolis play their home games at Estádio Jonas Duarte. The stadium has a maximum capacity of 17,800 people.

== Honours ==
- Campeonato Goiano
  - Winners (1): 2021
- Campeonato Goiano Second Division
  - Winners (1): 2017
- Campeonato Goiano Third Division
  - Winners (1): 2011
