= 2022 Campeonato Goiano =

Campeonato Goiano
- Season: 2022
- Dates: 25 January – 2 April
- Champions: Atlético Goianiense (16th title)
- Relegated: Goiatuba; Jataiense
- Copa do Brasil: Atlético Goianiense; Goiás; Vila Nova
- Série D: Anápolis; CRAC; Iporá
- Copa Verde: Atlético Goianiense
- Matches: 74
- Goals: 177 (2.39 per match)
- Top goalscorer: Nicolas (8 goals)

The 2022 Campeonato Goiano (officially the GOIANÃO 1XBET 2022 for sponsorship reasons) was the 79th edition of Goiás's top professional football league organized by FGF. The competition began on 25 January and ended on 2 April 2022.

The competition counted with the participation of Goiatuba and Morrinhos (teams promoted from the 2021 Campeonato Goiano da Divisão de Acesso) that occupied the two places of the two 2021 relegated teams. Grêmio Anápolis were the defending champions but they were eliminated in the first stage.

Atlético Goianiense defeated Goiás on aggregate 4–1 winning the Campeonato Goiano for the 16th time.

== Participating teams ==
| Club | Home city | Manager |
|---|---|---|
| Anápolis | Anápolis | Luiz Carlos Winck |
| Aparecidense | Aparecida de Goiânia | Thiago Carvalho |
| Atlético Goianiense | Goiânia | Umberto Louzer |
| CRAC | Catalão | Wilson Gottardo |
| Goianésia | Goianésia | Edson Júnior |
| Goiás | Goiânia | Glauber Ramos |
| Goiatuba | Goiatuba | Ariel Mamede |
| Grêmio Anápolis | Anápolis | Wender Said |
| Iporá | Iporá | Edson Silva |
| Jataiense | Jataí | Zé Humberto |
| Morrinhos | Morrinhos | Lucas Oliveira |
| Vila Nova | Goiânia | Higo Magalhães |

== Format ==
In the first stage, the 12 teams were drawn into two groups of six teams each.

| Group A | Group B |
|---|---|
| Grêmio Anápolis; Goiás; Anápolis; Jataiense; Goianésia; Morrinhos | Vila Nova; Atlético Goianiense; Aparecidense; CRAC; Iporá; Goiatuba |

Each group was played on a home-and-away round-robin basis. The teams were ranked according to points. If tied on points, the following criteria would be used to determine the ranking: 1. Wins; 2. Goal difference; 3. Goals scored; 4. Head-to-head points (only between two teams) 5. Fewest red cards; 6. Fewest yellow cards; 7. Draw. These criteria (except 4) also were used to determine the overall performance in the final stages.

The top four teams of each group advanced to the quarter-finals while the bottom team was relegated to 2023 Campeonato Goiano da Divisão de Acesso.

The final stages were played on a home-and-away two-legged basis. For the semi-finals and finals the best overall performance team hosted the second leg. If the score was level, a penalty shoot-out would be used to determine the winners.

Champions qualified for the 2023 Copa do Brasil and 2023 Copa Verde, while runners-up and third place only qualified for the 2023 Copa do Brasil. Top three teams not already qualified for 2023 Série A, Série B or Série C qualified for 2023 Campeonato Brasileiro Série D.

== First stage ==
=== Group A ===
| Pos | Team | Pld | W | D | L | GF | GA | GD | Pts | Qualification or relegation |
|---|---|---|---|---|---|---|---|---|---|---|
| 1 | Goiás | 10 | 7 | 2 | 1 | 19 | 8 | +11 | 23 | Advance to Quarter-finals |
| 2 | Anápolis | 10 | 6 | 2 | 2 | 14 | 9 | +5 | 20 | Advance to Quarter-finals |
| 3 | Morrinhos | 10 | 2 | 5 | 3 | 7 | 9 | −2 | 11 | Advance to Quarter-finals |
| 4 | Goianésia | 10 | 2 | 3 | 5 | 14 | 16 | −2 | 9 | Advance to Quarter-finals |
| 5 | Grêmio Anápolis | 10 | 0 | 8 | 2 | 6 | 8 | −2 | 8 | |
| 6 | Jataiense (R) | 10 | 1 | 4 | 5 | 6 | 16 | −10 | 7 | Relegation to the Divisão de Acesso |

Source: FGF
(R) Relegated

=== Group B ===
| Pos | Team | Pld | W | D | L | GF | GA | GD | Pts | Qualification or relegation |
|---|---|---|---|---|---|---|---|---|---|---|
| 1 | Vila Nova | 10 | 5 | 3 | 2 | 17 | 9 | +8 | 18 | Advance to Quarter-finals |
| 2 | Atlético Goianiense | 10 | 5 | 2 | 3 | 12 | 9 | +3 | 17 | Advance to Quarter-finals |
| 3 | Iporá | 10 | 4 | 3 | 3 | 12 | 15 | −3 | 15 | Advance to Quarter-finals |
| 4 | CRAC | 10 | 3 | 4 | 3 | 13 | 12 | +1 | 13 | Advance to Quarter-finals |
| 5 | Aparecidense | 10 | 3 | 3 | 4 | 11 | 13 | −2 | 12 | |
| 6 | Goiatuba (R) | 10 | 1 | 3 | 6 | 7 | 14 | −7 | 6 | Relegation to the Divisão de Acesso |

Source: FGF
(R) Relegated

== Final stage ==
=== Bracket ===
Quarter-finals
Morrinhos | 0 | 0 | 0
Atlético Goianiense | 1 | 3 | 4
Goianésia | 1 | 1 | 2
Vila Nova | 2 | 3 | 5
Iporá | 1 | 1 | 2
Anápolis | 1 | 0 | 1
CRAC | 0 | 0 | 0
Goiás | 3 | 3 | 6

Semi-finals
Atlético Goianiense | 3 | 1 | 4
Vila Nova | 2 | 1 | 3
Iporá | 0 | 3 | 3
Goiás | 2 | 2 | 4

Finals
Atlético Goianiense | 1 | 3 | 4
Goiás | 0 | 1 | 1

=== Quarter-finals ===
| Team 1 | Agg. | Team 2 | 1st leg | 2nd leg |
|---|---|---|---|---|
| CRAC | 0–6 | Goiás | 0–3 | 0–3 |
| Goianésia | 2–5 | Vila Nova | 1–2 | 1–3 |
| Iporá | 2–1 | Anápolis | 1–1 | 1–0 |
| Morrinhos | 0–4 | Atlético Goianiense | 0–1 | 0–3 |

==== Group C ====
9 March 2022
19:30

| CRAC | 0–3 | Goiás |
|---|---|---|
| | Report | Pedro Raul 49', 73'; Nicolas 56' (pen.) |

Estádio Genervino da Fonseca, Catalão
Attendance: 4,479
Referee: Eduardo Tomaz de Aquino Valadão

Match ended in the 80th minute due to a partial blackout.

13 March 2022
16:00

| Goiás | 3–0 | CRAC |
|---|---|---|
| Nicolas 45+2', 47'; Vinícius 88' | Report |

Estádio da Serrinha, Goiânia
Attendance: 5,335
Referee: Victor Lucas Pereira Silva

Goiás advance to the semi-finals

==== Group D ====
9 March 2022
20:00

| Goianésia | 1–2 | Vila Nova |
|---|---|---|
| Joãozinho 28' | Report | Victor Andrade 20'; João Lucas 90+3' |

Estádio Valdeir José de Oliveira, Goianésia
Attendance: 1,103
Referee: Wilton Sampaio

12 March 2022
16:30

| Vila Nova | 3–1 | Goianésia |
|---|---|---|
| Victor Andrade 2'; Matheuzinho 55'; Pablo Dyego 82' | Report | Nunes 36' |

Estádio Onésio Brasileiro Alvarenga, Goiânia
Attendance: 4,444
Referee: André Luiz de Freitas Castro

Vila Nova advance to the semi-finals

==== Group E ====
9 March 2022
15:30

| Iporá | 1–1 | Anápolis |
|---|---|---|
| Régis Potiguar 23' | Report | Davi Gabriel 8' |

Estádio Francisco José Ferreira, Iporá
Attendance: 1,023
Referee: Osimar Moreira da Silva Júnior

13 March 2022
16:00

| Anápolis | 0–1 | Iporá |
|---|---|---|
| | Report | Régis Potiguar 69' |

Estádio Jonas Duarte, Anápolis
Attendance: 4,059
Referee: Elmo Alves Resende Cunha

Iporá advance to the semi-finals

==== Group F ====
9 March 2022
20:30

| Morrinhos | 0–1 | Atlético Goianiense |
|---|---|---|
| | Report | Montenegro 90+7' |

Centro Esportivo João Vilela, Morrinhos
Attendance: 1,743
Referee: Jefferson Ferreira de Moraes

12 March 2022
18:30

| Atlético Goianiense | 3–0 | Morrinhos |
|---|---|---|
| Jorginho 28'; Rickson 63'; Montenegro 79' | Report |

Estádio Antônio Accioly, Goiânia
Attendance: 2,394
Referee: Eduardo Tomaz de Aquino Valadão

Atlético Goianiense advance to the semi-finals

=== Semi-finals ===
| Team 1 | Agg. | Team 2 | 1st leg | 2nd leg |
|---|---|---|---|---|
| Iporá | 3–4 | Goiás | 0–2 | 3–2 |
| Atlético Goianiense | 4–3 | Vila Nova | 3–2 | 1–1 |

==== Group G ====
20 March 2022
15:30

| Iporá | 0–2 | Goiás |
|---|---|---|
| | Report | Pedro Raul 17', 90+3' |

Estádio Francisco José Ferreira, Iporá
Attendance: 3,500
Referee: Jefferson Ferreira de Moraes

23 March 2022
19:30

| Goiás | 2–3 | Iporá |
|---|---|---|
| Pedro Raul 52'; Vinícius 68' | Report | Régis Potiguar 45'; Douglas Pelé 64'; Lídio 90+4' |

Estádio da Serrinha, Goiânia
Attendance: 11,496
Referee: Wilton Sampaio

Goiás advance to the finals

==== Group H ====
19 March 2022
16:30

| Atlético Goianiense | 3–2 | Vila Nova |
|---|---|---|
| Léo Pereira 15'; Shaylon 32'; Renato Silveira 43' (o.g.) | Report | Matheuzinho 25', 90+4' |

Estádio Antônio Accioly, Goiânia
Attendance: 6,387
Referee: Wilton Sampaio

22 March 2022
20:00

| Vila Nova | 1–1 | Atlético Goianiense |
|---|---|---|
| Rubens 55' (pen.) | Report | Wellington Rato 71' |

Estádio Onésio Brasileiro Alvarenga, Goiânia
Attendance: 10,000
Referee: Sávio Pereira Sampaio (Distrito Federal)

Atlético Goianiense advance to the finals

=== Finals ===
| Team 1 | Agg. | Team 2 | 1st leg | 2nd leg |
|---|---|---|---|---|
| Atlético Goianiense | 4–1 | Goiás | 1–0 | 3–1 |

==== Matches ====
26 March 2022
16:30

| Atlético Goianiense | 1–0 | Goiás |
|---|---|---|
| Marlon Freitas 83' (pen.) | Report |

Estádio Antônio Accioly, Goiânia
Attendance: 12,089
Referee: Eduardo Tomaz de Aquino Valadão

| Atlético Goianiense | Goiás |

| GK | 1 | (Brazil) Luan Polli |
| DF | 2 | (Brazil) Dudu |
| DF | 3 | (Brazil) Wanderson |
| DF | 4 | (Brazil) Edson |
| DF | 6 | (Brazil) Arthur Henrique | | (substituted off) 75' |
| MF | 5 | (Brazil) Gabriel Baralhas | (yellow card) 90+5' |
| MF | 8 | (Brazil) Marlon Freitas (c) |
| MF | 7 | (Brazil) Shaylon | | (substituted off) 90+8' |
| MF | 10 | (Brazil) Jorginho | (yellow card) 43' |
| FW | 11 | (Brazil) Léo Pereira | | (substituted off) 90+8' |
| FW | 9 | (Brazil) Wellington Rato | | (substituted off) 79' |
Substitutes:
| GK | 12 | (Brazil) Ronaldo |
| DF | 13 | (Brazil) Luan Sales |
| DF | 14 | (Brazil) Hayner | | (substituted on) 79' |
| DF | 15 | (Brazil) Gabriel |
| MF | 16 | (Brazil) Ramon Carvalho |
| MF | 17 | (Brazil) Rickson |
| MF | 18 | (Brazil) Isaac |
| FW | 19 | (Paraguay) Brian Montenegro | | (substituted on) 75' |
| FW | 20 | (Brazil) Airton | | (substituted on) 90+8' |
| FW | 21 | (Brazil) Luis Phelipe | | (substituted on) 90+8' |
| FW | 22 | (Brazil) Jean Carlos |
Coach:
(Brazil) Umberto Louzer

| GK | 1 | (Brazil) Tadeu (c) | (yellow card) 90+9' |
| DF | 2 | (Brazil) Maguinho |
| DF | 3 | (Brazil) Caetano | (yellow card) 43' |
| DF | 4 | (Brazil) Reynaldo | (red card) 63' |
| DF | 14 | (Brazil) Danilo Barcelos |
| MF | 5 | (Brazil) Auremir |
| MF | 8 | (Brazil) Fellipe Bastos | (yellow card) 81' |
| MF | 20 | (Brazil) Diego |
| FW | 11 | (Brazil) Luan | | (substituted off) 66' |
| FW | 7 | (Brazil) Vinícius | | (substituted off) 3' |
| FW | 9 | (Brazil) Pedro Raul |
Substitutes:
| GK | 12 | (Brazil) Matheus Alves |
| DF | 6 | (Brazil) Hugo |
| DF | 13 | (Brazil) Yan Souto | | (substituted on) 66' |
| DF | 15 | (Brazil) Everson |
| MF | 16 | (Brazil) Henrique Lordelo |
| MF | 17 | (Brazil) Índio |
| MF | 18 | (Brazil) Nathan |
| MF | 19 | (Brazil) Lincon |
| MF | 21 | (Brazil) Albano |
| MF | 22 | (Brazil) Apodi | | (substituted on) 3' |
Coach:
(Brazil) Glauber Ramos

Assistant referees:
Bruno Raphael Pires
Hugo Sávio Xavier Corrêa
Fourth official:
Rubens Paulo Rodrigues dos Santos
Video assistant referee:
Carlos Eduardo Nunes Braga (Rio de Janeiro)
Assistant video assistant referees:
Diogo Carvalho Silva (Rio de Janeiro)

2 April 2022
16:30

| Goiás | 1–3 | Atlético Goianiense |
|---|---|---|
| Nicolas 31' | Report | Marlon Freitas 46'; Wellington Rato 50'; Shaylon 66' |

Estádio da Serrinha, Goiânia
Attendance: 13,211
Referee: Luiz Flávio de Oliveira (São Paulo)

| Goiás | Atlético Goianiense |

| GK | 1 | (Brazil) Tadeu |
| DF | 20 | (Brazil) Diego |
| DF | 3 | (Brazil) Da Silva |
| DF | 23 | (Brazil) Yan Souto |
| DF | 14 | (Brazil) Danilo Barcelos |
| MF | 5 | (Brazil) Auremir |
| MF | 8 | (Brazil) Fellipe Bastos | (yellow card) 18' | (substituted off) 90' |
| MF | 10 | (Brazil) Élvis (c) |
| FW | 22 | (Brazil) Apodi | | (substituted off) 84' |
| FW | 9 | (Brazil) Nicolas | | (substituted off) 59' |
| FW | 18 | (Brazil) Pedro Raul | | (substituted off) 46' |
Substitutes:
| GK | 12 | (Brazil) Matheus Alves |
| DF | 2 | (Brazil) Maguinho | | (substituted on) 59' |
| DF | 6 | (Brazil) Hugo |
| DF | 13 | (Brazil) Everson |
| MF | 11 | (Brazil) Albano | | (substituted on) 46' |
| MF | 15 | (Brazil) Henrique Lordelo | | (substituted on) 90' |
| MF | 16 | (Brazil) Lincon |
| MF | 19 | (Brazil) Índio |
| MF | 21 | (Brazil) Nathan |
| FW | 7 | (Brazil) Vinícius |
| FW | 17 | (Brazil) Reginaldo | | (substituted on) 84' |
Coach:
(Brazil) Glauber Ramos

| GK | 1 | (Brazil) Luan Polli |
| DF | 2 | (Brazil) Dudu | | (substituted off) 85' |
| DF | 3 | (Brazil) Wanderson | (yellow card) 52' |
| DF | 4 | (Brazil) Edson | (yellow card) 58' |
| DF | 6 | (Brazil) Arthur Henrique | | (substituted off) 76' |
| MF | 5 | (Brazil) Gabriel Baralhas |
| MF | 8 | (Brazil) Marlon Freitas (c) | (yellow card) 47' |
| MF | 7 | (Brazil) Rickson |
| MF | 10 | (Brazil) Shaylon |
| FW | 11 | (Brazil) Léo Pereira | (yellow card) 25' | (substituted off) 85' |
| FW | 9 | (Brazil) Wellington Rato | | (substituted off) 75' |
Substitutes:
| GK | 12 | (Brazil) Renan |
| DF | 13 | (Brazil) Luan Sales | | (substituted on) 85' |
| DF | 14 | (Brazil) Hayner | | (substituted on) 76' |
| DF | 15 | (Brazil) Ramon Menezes |
| DF | 16 | (Brazil) Gabriel |
| MF | 17 | (Brazil) Ramon Carvalho |
| MF | 18 | (Brazil) Isaac |
| FW | 19 | (Paraguay) Brian Montenegro | | (substituted on) 75' |
| FW | 20 | (Brazil) Airton | | (substituted on) 85' |
| FW | 21 | (Brazil) Jean Carlos |
| FW | 22 | (Brazil) Luis Phelipe |
Coach:
(Brazil) Umberto Louzer

Assistant referees:
Marcelo Carvalho Van Gasse (São Paulo)
Anderson José de Moraes Coelho (São Paulo)
Fourth official:
Rodrigo Batista Raposo (Distrito Federal)
Video assistant referee:
Igor Junio Benevenuto (Minas Gerais)
Assistant video assistant referees:
Ciro Chaban Junqueira (Distrito Federal)

== Overall table ==
| Pos | Team | Pld | W | D | L | GF | GA | GD | Pts | Qualification or relegation |
|---|---|---|---|---|---|---|---|---|---|---|
| 1 | Atlético Goianiense | 16 | 10 | 3 | 3 | 24 | 13 | +11 | 33 | Champions and 2023 Copa do Brasil |
| 2 | Goiás | 16 | 10 | 2 | 4 | 30 | 15 | +15 | 32 | Runners-up and 2023 Copa do Brasil |
| 3 | Vila Nova | 14 | 7 | 4 | 3 | 25 | 15 | +10 | 25 | 2023 Copa do Brasil |
| 4 | Iporá | 14 | 6 | 4 | 4 | 17 | 20 | −3 | 22 | 2023 Série D |
| 5 | Anápolis | 12 | 6 | 3 | 3 | 15 | 11 | +4 | 21 | 2023 Série D |
| 6 | CRAC | 12 | 3 | 4 | 5 | 13 | 18 | −5 | 13 | 2023 Série D |
| 7 | Morrinhos | 12 | 2 | 5 | 5 | 7 | 13 | −6 | 11 | |
| 8 | Goianésia | 12 | 2 | 3 | 7 | 16 | 21 | −5 | 9 | |
| 9 | Aparecidense | 10 | 3 | 3 | 4 | 11 | 13 | −2 | 12 | |
| 10 | Grêmio Anápolis | 10 | 0 | 8 | 2 | 6 | 8 | −2 | 8 | |
| 11 | Jataiense | 10 | 1 | 4 | 5 | 6 | 16 | −10 | 7 | Relegation to the 2023 Divisão de Acesso |
| 12 | Goiatuba | 10 | 1 | 3 | 6 | 7 | 14 | −7 | 6 | Relegation to the 2023 Divisão de Acesso |

Source: FGF

== Top goalscorers ==
| Rank | Player | Team | Goals |
|---|---|---|---|
| 1 | Nicolas | Goiás | 8 |
| 2 | Matheuzinho | Vila Nova | 7 |
| 2 | Pedro Raul | Goiás | 7 |
| 4 | Joãozinho | Goianésia | 6 |
| 5 | Rubens | Vila Nova | 5 |
