= Danillo Ribeiro =

Brazilian footballer (born 1993)

Personal information
- Full name: Danillo Ribeiro Cardoso
- Date of birth: 14 January 1993 (age 33)
- Place of birth: Iporá, Brazil
- Height: 1.73 m (5 ft 8 in)
- Positions: Left back; attacking midfielder

Team information
- Current team: Goiânia

Senior career*
Years	Team	Apps	(Gls)
2012	Iporá	5	(1)
2012–2013	Umuarama	21	(4)
2013	Fernandópolis	34	(5)
2013	Quirinópolis	8	(0)
2014	Luziânia	1	(0)
2014	Quirinópolis	7	(4)
2015	Taubaté	18	(2)
2015	Olímpia	8	(3)
2016–2017	São Carlos	0	(0)
2016–2017	→ Santos (loan)	0	(0)
2018	Iporá	21	(4)
2018	Atlético Goianiense	0	(0)
2019	Villa Nova	2	(0)
2019	Iporá	17	(1)
2019	Rio Verde	9	(5)
2019	Umuarama	4	(1)
2020	Iporá	9	(0)
2020–2021	Goiânia	19	(3)
2021	Iporá	11	(0)
2021	Comercial-SP	8	(1)
2021	→ Barcelona de Ilhéus (loan)	8	(0)
2021	→ Inhumas (loan)	4	(0)
2022	Marília	18	(1)
2022	Iporá	8	(0)
2022	Uruaçu	8	(3)
2023	Morrinhos	10	(2)
2023–	Patrocinense	0	(0)
- * Club domestic league appearances and goals as of 02:01, 23 February 2023 (UTC)

Danillo Ribeiro Cardoso (born 14 January 1993), known as Danillo Ribeiro or simply Danillo, is a Brazilian footballer who plays for Patrocinense as either a left back or an attacking midfielder.

== Club career ==
Born in Iporá, Goiás, Danillo made his senior debut with Iporá in 2012, in Campeonato Goiano Segunda Divisão. He subsequently represented Umuarama Esporte Clube, Fernandópolis, Esporte Clube Quirinópolis (two stints), Luziânia under the period of two years, appearing in Série D with the latter.

In December 2014 Danillo joined Taubaté, in Campeonato Paulista Série A3. On 20 August of the following year he moved to Olímpia.

On 19 December 2015 Danillo signed a one-year deal with Santos, being assigned to the under-23 squad. He struggled severely with injuries during his spell, and moved back to his first club Iporá in November 2017.

On 3 July 2018, Danillo moved to Série B side Atlético Goianiense, but failed to appear for the club. Ahead of the 2019 season he joined Villa Nova, but moved back to Iporá on 1 February of that year.

== Career statistics ==
As of 22 February 2023

Club	Season	League			State League		Cup		Continental		Other		Total	
Club	Season	Division	Apps	Goals	Apps	Goals	Apps	Goals	Apps	Goals	Apps	Goals	Apps	Goals
Iporá	2012	Goiano 2ª Divisão	—		5	1	—		—		—		5	1
Umuarama	2012	Goiano 3ª Divisão	—		9	1	—		—		—		9	1
Umuarama	2013	Goiano 2ª Divisão	—		12	3	—		—		—		12	3
Umuarama	Total		—		21	4	—		—		—		21	4
Fernandópolis	2013	Paulista 2ª Divisão	—		34	5	—		—		—		34	5
Quirinópolis	2013	Goiano 3ª Divisão	—		8	0	—		—		—		8	0
Luziânia	2014	Série D	1	0	—		—		—		—		1	0
Quirinópolis	2014	Goiano 3ª Divisão	—		7	4	—		—		—		7	4
Taubaté	2015	Paulista A3	—		18	2	—		—		—		18	2
Olímpia	2015	Paulista 2ª Divisão	—		8	3	—		—		—		8	3
Santos	2016	Série A	0	0	—		0	0	—		0	0	0	0
Santos	2017	Série A	0	0	—		0	0	—		7 (Note: Appearance(s) in Copa Paulista)	3	7	3
Santos	Total		0	0	—		0	0	—		7	3	7	3
Iporá	2018	Série D	8	2	13	2	—		—		—		21	4
Atlético Goianiense	2018	Série B	0	0	—		—		—		—		0	0
Villa Nova	2019	Mineiro	—		2	0	—		—		—		2	0
Iporá	2019	Série D	9	1	8	0	—		—		4 (Note: Appearance(s) in Copa Verde)	0	21	1
Rio Verde	2019	Goiano 2ª Divisão	—		9	5	—		—		—		9	5
Umuarama	2019	Goiano 3ª Divisão	—		4	1	—		—		—		4	1
Iporá	2020	Goiano	—		9	0	—		—		—		9	0
Goiânia	2020	Série D	17	3	2	0	—		—		—		19	3
Iporá	2021	Goiano	—		11	0	—		—		—		11	0
Comercial-SP	2021	Paulista A3	—		8	1	—		—		5	0	13	1
Barcelona de Ilhéus (loan)	2021	Baiano 2ª Divisão	—		8	0	—		—		—		8	0
Inhumas (loan)	2021	Goiano 2ª Divisão	—		4	0	—		—		—		4	0
Marília	2022	Paulista A3	—		18	1	—		—		—		18	1
Iporá	2022	Série D	8	0	—		—		—		—		8	0
Uruaçu	2022	Goiano 3ª Divisão	—		8	0	—		—		—		8	0
Morrinhos	2023	Goiano	—		10	2	—		—		—		10	2
Patrocinense	2023	Série D	0	0	0	0	—		—		—		0	0
Career total			43	6	215	31	0	0	0	0	16	3	270	40

== Honours ==
Taubaté

- Campeonato Paulista Série A3: 2015
