= Michael (footballer, born March 1996) =

Brazilian footballer (born 1996)

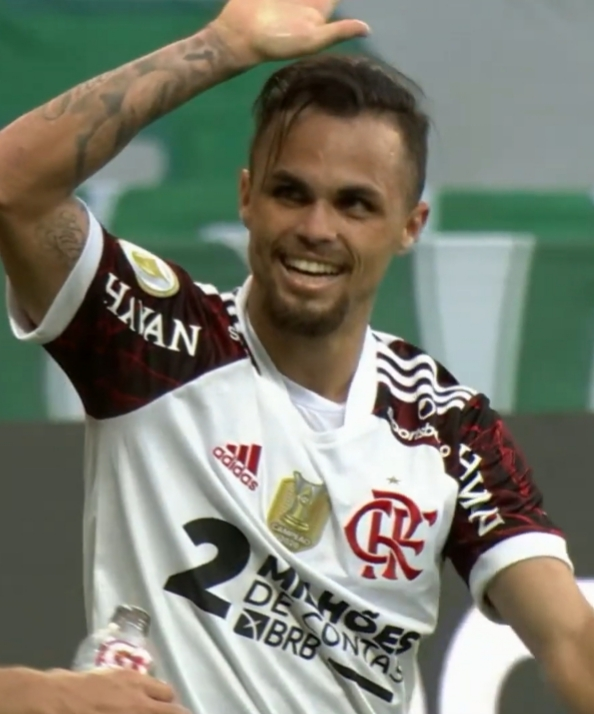
- Michael with Flamengo in 2021

Personal information
- Full name: Michael Richard Delgado de Oliveira
- Date of birth: 12 March 1996 (age 30)
- Place of birth: Poxoréu, Brazil
- Height: 1.66 m (5 ft 5 in)
- Position: Forward

Team information
- Current team: Al-Ula
- Number: 96

Youth career
- Diamante Verde
- 2016: Goiânia

Senior career*
Years	Team	Apps	(Gls)
2015	Monte Cristo	6	(0)
2016	Goiânia	7	(1)
2017	Goianésia	13	(5)
2017–2019	Goiás	118	(24)
2020–2021	Flamengo	78	(19)
2022–2024	Al Hilal	68	(13)
2024–2025	Flamengo	32	(6)
2026–	Al-Ula	0	(0)
- * Club domestic league appearances and goals as of 13 December 2025

Michael Richard Delgado de Oliveira (born 12 March 1996), simply known as Michael, is a Brazilian professional footballer. who plays as a forward for Saudi First Division League club Al-Ula.

== Club career ==
=== Early career ===
Born in Poxoréu, Mato Grosso, Michael started his career with hometown side Escolinha Diamante Verde. In 2012 he moved to Goiânia, having failed trials at Atlético Goianiense, Goiás, Vila Nova and Goiânia.

In 2015, after spending a period representing amateur side Euro Brasil, Michael joined Monte Cristo in the third division of the Campeonato Goiano. He made his senior debut on 29 August of that year, starting in a 0–5 away loss against Caldas.

In 2016 Michael signed a contract with Goiânia; initially assigned to the under-20s, he was promoted to the first team ahead of the year's second division of the Campeonato Goiano. He scored his first senior goal on 14 August, netting the game's only in a home success over Evangélica.

On 26 December 2016, Michael joined Goianésia in the state league first division. A regular starter, he scored a hat-trick in a 5–1 home routing of Vila Nova the following 12 March.

=== Goiás ===
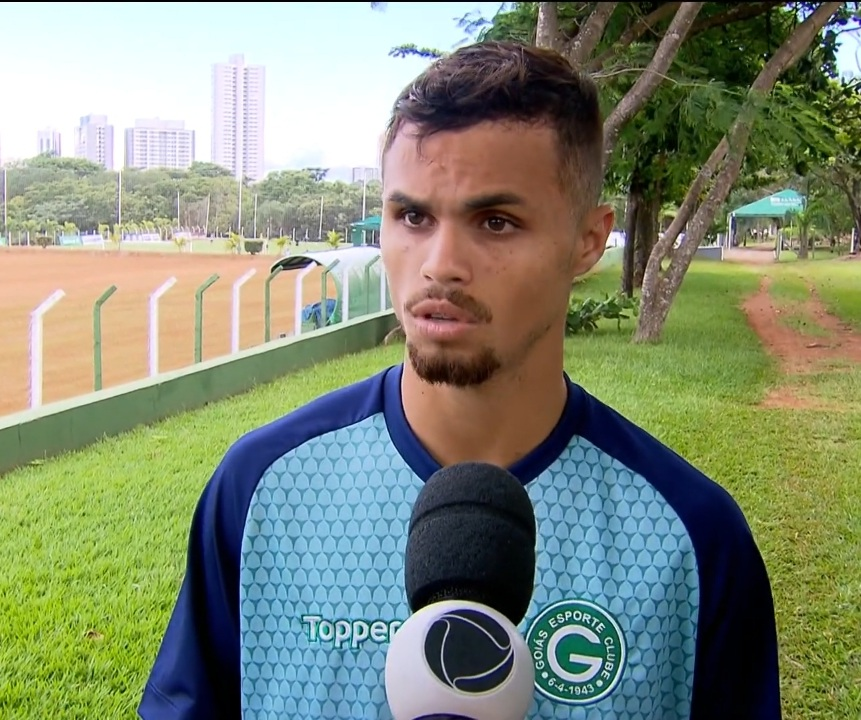
Michael during an interview in 2019 as a player of Goiás

On 13 April 2017, after being named the breakthrough player of the 2017 Goianão, Michael was presented at Goiás. He made his debut for the club on 13 May, coming on as a half-time substitute for Jean Carlos in a 1–0 home defeat to Figueirense for the Série B championship.

Michael scored his first professional goal on 7 July 2017, netting his team's second in a 3–1 home win against Luverdense. He was mainly utilized as a substitute during his first season, as his side narrowly avoided relegation.

Michael became a regular starter during the 2018 campaign, contributing with seven goals in 33 appearances as his side achieved promotion to Série A. He made his top tier debut on 28 April 2019, starting in a 1–0 away defeat of Fluminense.

Michael scored his first goal in the first division on 5 May 2019, but in a 2–1 loss at Cruzeiro. During the months of October and November, he scored six goals in 12 appearances.

=== Flamengo ===
On 10 January 2020, Goiás announced the transfer of Michael to Flamengo for a fee of €7.5 million.

=== Al Hilal ===
Michael arrived at Al-Hilal in January 2022, when he was bought for around 7.6 million euros from Flamengo.

In his third at Al-Hilal, Michael enjoyed his best season in Saudi Arabia. He participated in 50 games, contributing 11 goals and 10 assists, won the Saudi Pro League, King's Cup and Super Cup, and helped the club set a new world record of 34 consecutive victories.

== Career statistics ==
As of match played 18 January 2025

Appearances and goals by club, season and competition
Club	Season	League			State league (Note: Includes Campeonato Goiano Terceira Divisão, Campeonato Goiano Segunda Divisão, Campeonato Goiano, Campeonato Carioca)		National cup (Note: Includes Copa do Brasil, King Cup)		Continental		Other		Total	
Club	Season	Division	Apps	Goals	Apps	Goals	Apps	Goals	Apps	Goals	Apps	Goals	Apps	Goals
Monte Cristo	2015	Goiano 3ª Divisão	—		6	0	—		—		—		6	0
Goiânia	2016	Goiano 2ª Divisão	—		7	1	—		—		—		7	1
Goianésia	2017	Goiano	—		13	5	—		—		—		13	5
Goiás	2017	Série B	23	1	2	0	—		—		—		25	1
Goiás	2018	Série B	33	7	11	0	6	0	—		—		50	7
Goiás	2019	Série A	35	9	16	7	2	0	—		1 (Note: Appearance in Copa Verde)	1	54	17
Goiás	Total		91	17	27	7	10	0	—		1	1	129	25
Flamengo	2020	Série A	20	0	13	3	3	1	5 (Note: Appearances in Copa Libertadores)	0	2 (Note: One appearance in Recopa Sudamericana, one appearance in Supercopa do Brasil)	0	43	4
Flamengo	2021	Série A	35	14	10	2	8	2	8	1	1 (Note: Appearance in Supercopa do Brasil)	0	62	19
Flamengo	Total		55	14	23	5	11	3	13	1	3	0	105	23
Al Hilal	2021–22	Saudi Pro League	11	2	—		3	0	3 (Note: Appearances in AFC Champions League)	1	3 (Note: Appearances in FIFA Club World Cup)	0	20	3
Al Hilal	2022–23	Saudi Pro League	24	6	—		4	2	3	0	4 (Note: One appearance in Saudi Super Cup, three appearances in FIFA Club World Cup)	0	36	8
Al Hilal	2023–24	Saudi Pro League	33	5	—		4	2	7	2	6 (Note: Appearances in Arab Club Champions Cup)	2	50	11
Al Hilal	Total		68	13	—		11	4	13	3	13	2	105	22
Flamengo	2024	Série A	12	4	—		4	0	0	0	—		16	4
Career total			225	48	86	18	37	7	25	3	17	3	347	80

== Honours ==
=== Club ===
Goiás

- Campeonato Goiano: 2018

Flamengo

- FIFA Challenger Cup: 2025
- FIFA Derby of the Americas: 2025
- Copa Libertadores: 2025
- Recopa Sudamericana: 2020
- Campeonato Brasileiro Série A: 2020, 2025
- Copa do Brasil: 2024
- Supercopa do Brasil: 2020, 2021, 2025
- Campeonato Carioca: 2020, 2021, 2025

Al-Hilal

- Saudi Pro League: 2021–22, 2023–24
- King Cup: 2022–23, 2023–24
- Saudi Super Cup: 2023, 2024

=== Individual ===
- Troféu Mesa Redonda: 2019
- Campeonato Brasileiro Série A Best Newcomer: 2019
- Bola de Prata Best Newcomer: 2019
- Campeonato Brasileiro Série A Team of the Year: 2021
