= Diogo Marzagão =

Brazilian footballer (born 1987)

Marzagão
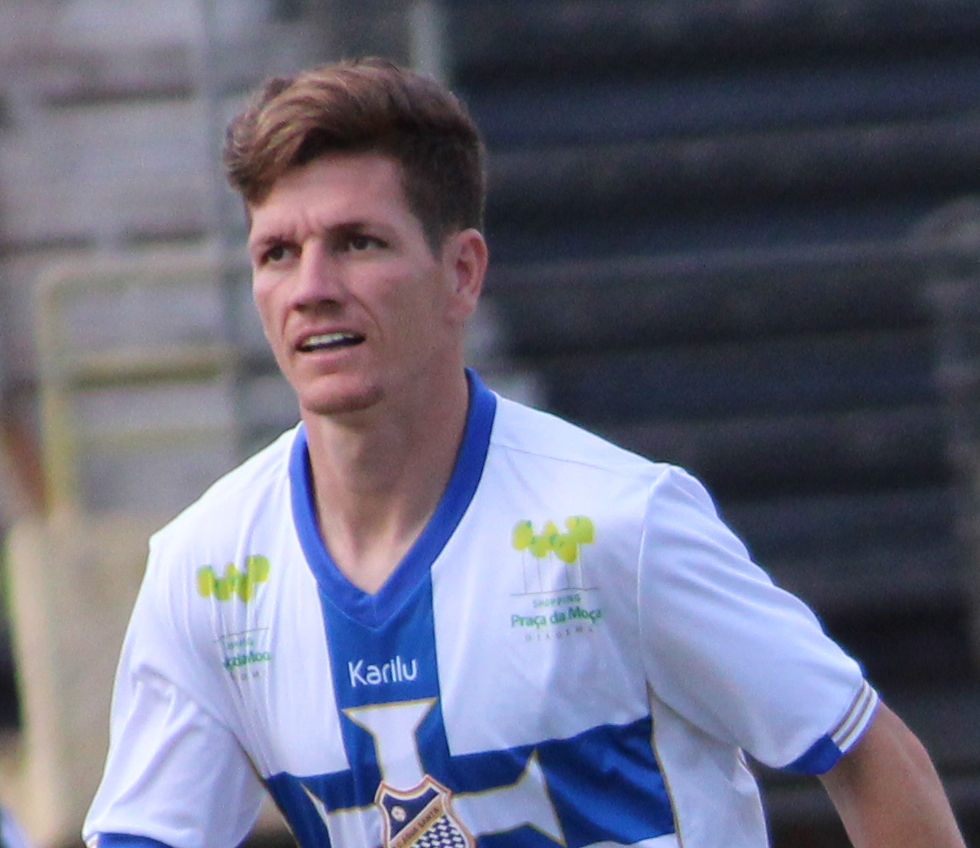
- Marzagão with Água Santa in 2019

Personal information
- Full name: Diogo Lúcio Tavares Pires
- Date of birth: 4 June 1987 (age 39)
- Place of birth: São Paulo, Brazil
- Height: 1.78 m (5 ft 10 in)
- Position: Defensive midfielder

Team information
- Current team: Água Santa
- Number: 16

Senior career*
Years	Team	Apps	(Gls)
2006	Novo Horizonte		
2009–2010	CRAC	9	(0)
2010–2011	Fluminense-MG		
2011	Quirinópolis	9	(2)
2012	Goianésia	15	(1)
2012	Grêmio Anápolis	16	(0)
2012	→ Quirinópolis (loan)	12	(1)
2013	URT		
2013	Caldas Novas	16	(0)
2013	Quirinópolis	10	(3)
2014	URT	10	(0)
2014	Novo Horizonte	7	(0)
2015	URT	11	(1)
2015	Rio Branco-AC	3	(0)
2015	Caldense	11	(0)
2016	Barretos	21	(2)
2016	Rio Verde	12	(2)
2017	Votuporanguense	12	(0)
2017	Anapolina	10	(0)
2017	ABECAT	1	(0)
2018	Villa Nova	10	(0)
2018	Novorizontino	9	(0)
2018	CRAC	4	(0)
2019–2021	Água Santa	36	(1)
2021	→ Portuguesa (loan)	14	(0)
2022–2023	Portuguesa	24	(2)
2024	São José-SP	28	(0)
2025	Juventus-SP	14	(0)
2025	URT	13	(0)
2026-	Água Santa	28	(1)
- * Club domestic league appearances and goals as of 13:41, 22 July 2026 (UTC)

Diogo Lúcio Tavares Pires (born 4 June 1987), known as Diogo Marzagão or just Marzagão, is a Brazilian footballer who plays as a defensive midfielder for Água Santa.

== Club career ==
Marzagão was born in São Paulo, but began his career with Novo Horizonte in 2006. After playing amateur football, he played for CRAC during two Campeonato Goiano editions, before joining Fluminense de Araguari.

In the following years, Marzagão played mainly in the Goiás state, representing Quirinópolis (three stints), Goianésia, Grêmio Anápolis, Caldas Novas and Novo Horizonte. In 2013, 2014 and 2015, he also featured for URT.

On 2 July 2015, after a short period at Rio Branco-AC, Marzagão signed for Caldense. He moved to Barretos in December, before returning to Goiás with Rio Verde.

In December 2016, Marzagão was included in Votuporanguense's squad for the 2017 season, and was later presented at Anapolina on 1 May of that year. He subsequently moved to ABECAT, but was released on 30 August 2017, after just one match.

In December 2017, Marzagão joined Villa Nova ahead of the 2018 campaign. On 27 March 2018, he was announced as an addition of Novorizontino, and returned to CRAC on 14 August.

On 22 October 2018, Marzagão agreed to a deal with Água Santa, and helped the club in their promotion from Campeonato Paulista Série A2 in 2019 and 2021, the latter as champions. On 9 June 2021, he was loaned to Portuguesa for the year's Série D.

On 23 November 2021, Marzagão signed a permanent deal with Lusa. He left the club on 17 November 2023, after being a regular starter, and moved to São José-SP just hours later.

== Career statistics ==
As of match played 27 June 2026

Appearances and goals by club, season and competition
Club	Season	League			State League		Cup		Continental		Other		Total	
Club	Season	Division	Apps	Goals	Apps	Goals	Apps	Goals	Apps	Goals	Apps	Goals	Apps	Goals
CRAC	2009	Série D	0	0	5	0	—		—		—		5	0
CRAC	2010	Goiano	—		4	0	—		—		—		4	0
CRAC	Total		0	0	9	0	—		—		—		9	0
Quirinópolis	2011	Goiano 3ª Divisão	—		9	2	—		—		—		9	2
Goianésia	2012	Goiano	—		15	1	—		—		—		15	1
Grêmio Anápolis	2012	Goiano 2ª Divisão	—		16	0	—		—		—		16	0
Quirinópolis	2012	Goiano 3ª Divisão	—		12	1	—		—		—		12	1
Caldas Novas	2013	Goiano 2ª Divisão	—		16	0	—		—		—		16	0
Quirinópolis	2013	Goiano 3ª Divisão	—		10	3	—		—		—		10	3
URT	2014	Mineiro	—		10	0	—		—		—		10	0
Novo Horizonte	2014	Goiano 2ª Divisão	—		7	0	—		—		—		7	0
URT	2015	Mineiro	—		11	1	—		—		—		11	1
Rio Branco-AC	2015	Série D	0	0	3	0	1	0	—		—		4	0
Caldense	2015	Série D	11	0	—		—		—		—		11	0
Barretos	2016	Paulista A2	—		21	2	—		—		—		21	2
Rio Verde	2016	Goiano 2ª Divisão	—		12	2	—		—		—		12	2
Votuporanguense	2017	Paulista A2	—		12	0	—		—		—		12	0
Anapolina	2017	Goiano 2ª Divisão	—		10	0	—		—		—		10	0
ABECAT	2017	Goiano 3ª Divisão	—		1	0	—		—		—		1	0
Villa Nova	2018	Mineiro	—		10	0	—		—		—		10	0
Novorizontino	2018	Série D	9	0	—		—		—		—		9	0
CRAC	2018	Goiano 2ª Divisão	—		4	0	—		—		—		4	0
Água Santa	2019	Paulista A2	—		17	0	—		—		5 (Note: Appearance(s) in Copa Paulista)	1	22	1
Água Santa	2020	Paulista	—		1	0	—		—		8	0	9	0
Água Santa	2021	Paulista A2	—		18	1	—		—		—		18	1
Água Santa	Total		—		36	1	—		—		13	1	49	2
Portuguesa	2021	Série D	14	0	—		—		—		8	0	22	0
Portuguesa	2022	Paulista A2	—		17	2	—		—		13	1	30	3
Portuguesa	2023	Paulista	—		7	0	—		—		11	0	18	0
Portuguesa	Total		14	0	24	2	—		—		32	1	70	3
São José-SP	2024	Série D	14	0	14	0	—		—		—		28	0
Juventus-SP	2025	Paulista A2	—		14	0	—		—		—		14	0
URT	2025	Mineiro Módulo II	—		13	0	—		—		—		13	0
Água Santa	2026	Série D	11	1	17	0	—		—		—		28	1
Career total			59	1	306	15	1	0	0	0	45	2	411	18

== Honours ==
=== Club ===
Rio Branco-AC

- Campeonato Acreano: 2015

Rio Verde

- Campeonato Goiano Segunda Divisão: 2016

CRAC

- Campeonato Goiano Segunda Divisão: 2018

Água Santa

- Campeonato Paulista Série A2: 2021

Portuguesa

- Campeonato Paulista Série A2: 2022

=== Individual ===
- Campeonato Paulista Série A2 Best XI: 2022
