= Glauber Ramos =

Brazilian football manager (born 1974)

Personal information
- Full name: Glauber Ramos da Silva
- Date of birth: 10 November 1974 (age 51)
- Place of birth: Gama, Brazil

Team information
- Current team: Ypiranga-RS (head coach)

Senior career*
Years	Team	Apps	(Gls)
1992	Gama		
1993	Palmeiras		

Managerial career
- 2006–2007: Brasiliense U20
- 2007: Pires do Rio U20
- 2008: Brasiliense U20
- 2009: Gama U20
- 2009–2010: Brasília U20
- 2010–2011: Botafogo-DF (assistant)
- 2011: Brasiliense (assistant)
- 2012: Gama (assistant)
- 2013: Gama U20
- 2013–2015: Goiás U20 (assistant)
- 2016–2017: Gama (assistant)
- 2017: Gama (interim)
- 2017–2020: Goiás U20 (assistant)
- 2020: Goiás (interim)
- 2020–2022: Goiás (assistant)
- 2021: Goiás (interim)
- 2021: Goiás (interim)
- 2021–2022: Goiás (interim)
- 2022: Goiás (interim)
- 2023: Grêmio Anápolis
- 2023: Vila Nova (assistant)
- 2023: Trindade
- 2024: Goiânia
- 2024: Águia de Marabá
- 2025: Gama
- 2025: Trindade
- 2025: Crixás
- 2026: Goiatuba
- 2027–: Ypiranga-RS
- * Club domestic league appearances and goals

Glauber Ramos da Silva (born 10 November 1974) is a Brazilian football coach, currently the head coach of Ypiranga-RS.

== Career ==
Born in Gama, Federal District, Ramos had a short career as a player, and notably represented the reserve team of Palmeiras in 1993. After retiring, he worked at Brasiliense and Pires do Rio before meeting Augusto César at Brasília in 2009. The duo then worked together at Botafogo-DF, before Ramos became Marcos Soares' assistant at Brasiliense in 2011.

Ramos rejoined Augusto's staff at Gama in 2012, being later named coach of Goiás' under-18 squad while Augusto was in charge of the under-20s; as the under-18 category was not official, he became Augusto's assistant in the under-20s. In 2016, Ramos returned to Gama, being an assistant coach of Arthur Bernardes and Reinaldo Gueldini before being named interim coach for the last match of the 2017 Campeonato Brasiliense.

In September 2017, Ramos returned to Goiás, and was again Augusto's assistant. In August 2020, he was named interim coach of the main squad after the dismissal of Ney Franco.

After being interim for one match, Ramos returned to his previous role after the appointment of Thiago Larghi. In November, after Enderson Moreira was sacked, he was named Augusto's assistant in the main squad, but was the one who signed the match reports as head coach as Augusto did not have the Brazilian Football Confederation's A license to manage.

On 12 April 2021, Ramos was again named interim after Augusto was sacked. He was also an interim on two more occasions during the campaign, after the dismissals of Pintado and Marcelo Cabo, and led the side back to the Série A in December.

Ramos remained an interim for the start of the 2022 season, before returning to his previous role in late February after the appointment of Bruno Pivetti. In March, he was again interim after Pivetti sacked, but left the Esmeraldino on 14 April, shortly after the appointment of Jair Ventura as head coach. On 16 January 2023, he was named in head coach of Grêmio Anápolis.

In the following years, Ramos worked mainly as head coach in teams from the Goiás state, notably leading Goiatuba to a promotion to the Série C. On 9 October 2026, he was named head coach of Ypiranga-RS also in the third division.

== Coaching statistics ==
As of 12 October 2026.

Coaching record by team and tenure
Team	Nat	From	To	Record								Ref
Team	Nat	From	To	G	W	D	L	GF	GA	GD	Win %	Ref
Gama (interim)	(Brazil)	10 April 2017	17 April 2017	1	1	0	0	2	1	+1	100.00	
Goiás (interim)	(Brazil)	20 August 2020	22 August 2020	1	1	0	0	2	0	+2	100.00	
Goiás (interim)	(Brazil)	12 April 2021	29 April 2021	4	0	2	2	2	7	−5	0.00	
Goiás (interim)	(Brazil)	18 July 2021	20 July 2021	1	1	0	0	2	0	+2	100.00	
Goiás (interim)	(Brazil)	29 October 2021	24 February 2022	15	9	5	1	27	13	+14	60.00	
Goiás (interim)	(Brazil)	25 March 2022	14 April 2022	3	0	0	3	1	7	−6	0.00	
Grêmio Anápolis	(Brazil)	16 January 2023	16 February 2023	9	1	4	4	10	16	−6	11.11	
Vila Nova (interim) (Note: Interim head coach as Claudinei Oliveira was away due to a pneumonia)	(Brazil)	12 May 2023	12 May 2023	1	0	1	0	0	0	+0	0.00	
Trindade	(Brazil)	29 August 2023	20 November 2023	12	6	2	4	19	11	+8	50.00	
Goiânia	(Brazil)	20 November 2023	26 March 2024	15	3	5	7	15	19	−4	20.00	
Águia de Marabá	(Brazil)	12 May 2024	31 July 2024	12	2	6	4	9	17	−8	16.67	
Gama	(Brazil)	9 September 2024	25 February 2025	8	5	1	2	7	4	+3	62.50	
Trindade	(Brazil)	10 July 2025	14 August 2025	5	2	1	2	8	6	+2	40.00	
Crixás	(Brazil)	14 August 2025	16 November 2025	10	6	4	0	14	3	+11	60.00	
Goiatuba	(Brazil)	23 January 2026	9 October 2026	24	11	9	4	29	19	+10	45.83	
Ypiranga-RS	(Brazil)	9 October 2026	present	0	0	0	0	0	0	+0	—	
Total				121	48	40	33	147	123	+24	39.67	—
