= Renato Vischi =

Brazilian footballer

Personal information
- Full name: Renato Barbosa Vischi
- Date of birth: 30 May 1998 (age 28)
- Place of birth: Artur Nogueira, São Paulo, Brazil
- Height: 1.83 m (6 ft 0 in)
- Position: Defender

Team information
- Current team: Goiatuba
- Number: 3

Youth career
- –2015: Fluminense
- 2016–2017: Vicenza

Senior career*
Years	Team	Apps	(Gls)
2017–2018	Vicenza	0	(0)
2017–2018	→ S.P.A.L. (loan)	0	(0)
2018	→ Almirante Barroso (loan)		
2019–2021	Tombense	0	(0)
2019	→ São Bernardo-SP (loan)	0	(0)
2020–2021	→ Primavera (loan)	18	(0)
2021	→ Barra-SC (loan)	7	(0)
2021	→ Morrinhos (loan)	9	(0)
2022	Ventforet Kofu	4	(0)
2023	Pouso Alegre	22	(1)
2024	Laguna		
2025–	Primavera	2	(0)
2025–	→ ABC (loan)	2	(0)
2025–	Goiatuba	19	(0)
- * Club domestic league appearances and goals as of 19 November 2026

Renato Barbosa Vischi (born 30 May 1998) is a Brazilian footballer who currently plays as a defender for Goiatuba.

== Career statistics ==
=== Club ===
As of 9 February 2022.

Club	Season	League			State League		Cup		Other		Total	
Club	Season	Division	Apps	Goals	Apps	Goals	Apps	Goals	Apps	Goals	Apps	Goals
Vicenza	2016–17	Serie B	0	0	–		1 (Note: Appearances in the Coppa Italia)	0	0	0	1	0
Vicenza	2017–18	Serie B	0	0	–		0	0	0	0	0	0
Vicenza	Total		0	0	0	0	1	0	0	0	1	0
S.P.A.L. (loan)	2017–18	Serie A	0	0	–		0	0	0	0	0	0
Tombense	2019	Série C	0	0	0	0	0	0	0	0	0	0
Tombense	2020	Série C	0	0	0	0	0	0	0	0	0	0
Tombense	2021	Série C	0	0	0	0	0	0	0	0	0	0
Tombense	Total		0	0	0	0	0	0	0	0	0	0
São Bernardo-SP (loan)	2019	–			0	0	0	0	0	0	0	0
Primavera (loan)	2020	–			1 (Note: Appearances in the Campeonato Paulista Série A3)	0	0	0	8 (Note: Appearances in the Copa Paulista)	0	9	0
Primavera (loan)	2021	–			17	0	0	0	0	0	17	0
Primavera (loan)	Total		0	0	18	0	0	0	8	0	26	0
Barra-SC (loan)	2021	–			7 (Note: Appearances in the Campeonato Catarinense Série B)	0	0	0	0	0	7	0
Morrinhos (loan)	2021	–			9 (Note: Appearances in the Campeonato Goiano Segunda Divisão)	0	0	0	0	0	9	0
Ventforet Kofu	2022	J2 League	0	0	–		0	0	0	0	0	0
Career total			28	3	7	1	6	1	10	5	51	10
