= Marquinhos (footballer, born 1961) =

Brazilian football manager and former player

Personal information
- Full name: Marco Antonio Carmo Anjos
- Date of birth: 23 October 1961 (age 65)
- Place of birth: Rio de Janeiro, Brazil
- Height: 1.82 m (6 ft 0 in)
- Position: Forward

Senior career*
Years	Team	Apps	(Gls)
1978–1979	America (RJ)		
1980	São Paulo		
1981	Goiânia		
1981	São Paulo		
1982	Goiânia		
1985–1986	América (GO)		
1988	Fluminense de Feira		
1989–1990	Oliveira do Hospital		
1990–1991	Spartak Subotica	1	(0)

Managerial career
- 2007–2008: 1º de Dezembro
- 2008–2014: Castelo forte
- * Club domestic league appearances and goals

Marco Antonio Carmo Anjos, known as Marquinhos (born 23 October 1961) is a Brazilian football manager and former player. His son, Gabriel Anjos, is also a footballer.

== Playing career ==
Born in Rio de Janeiro, Anjos played with America (RJ), São Paulo, Goiânia, América (GO) and Fluminense de Feira in Brazil.

Next he moved to Europe, first by playing with Portuguese side Académico de Viseu F.C. in the Primeira Liga (Portuguese First League) and moving to Oliveira do Hospital after. After one season in Portugal, he moved to Belgium where he played for R.C.S. Brainois.

Through a strong season in Belgium, Anjos had the opportunity to reach the elite of the European football, moving to Serbia (at that time still Yugoslavia) to represent Spartak Subotica. He was along Carlos Roberto Jatobá and Osvaldo Monteiro the second Brazilians to play in the Yugoslav First League (the first one had been Domingo Franulovic in 1957 with RNK Split). Anjos played for Spartak Subotica in the 1990–91 season. In the same season he left for HNK Rijeka, in the Yugoslav First League.

== Coaching career ==
After retiring, Anjos became coach, managing Portuguese clubs 1º de Dezembro and Castelo Forte Futebol Clube. In 2013, he joined the scouting department of Sporting Clube de Portugal.

Anjos was selected to coach the Portugal team that took part in the 2014 Expo Unity World Cup, leading the team to the semi-finals. In the next season he took the position of Technical Director in Mumbai Rush Soccer Academy.
