= Wellington Dias (footballer) =

Brazilian footballer (born 1977)

Personal information
- Full name: Wellington Vicente Dias
- Date of birth: 11 October 1977 (age 49)
- Place of birth: Caldas Novas, Brazil
- Height: 1.71 m (5 ft 7 in)
- Position: Midfielder

Youth career
- 1994: Flamengo
- 1994–1995: Caldas

Senior career*
Years	Team	Apps	(Gls)
1995–1996	Caldas		
1996–1998	Atlético Goianiense		
1998	Vila Nova		
1999–2000	Anapolina		
2001	Grêmio Inhumense		
2001	CRAC		
2001–2006	Brasiliense		
2007	Guratinguetá		
2007	Esportivo Guará		
2007	Fast Clube		
2008	Guarani-MG		
2008	Iporá		
2008	Funorte		
2009	Brasiliense		
2009	→ Brasília (loan)		
2009	→ CFZ-DF (loan)		
2009	→ Capital-DF (loan)		
2010	Capital-DF		
2011	Grêmio Anápolis		
2012	URT		
2012	Iporá		
2017	Caldas		
- * Club domestic league appearances and goals as of 11 October 2023

Wellington Dias (born 11 October 1977), is a Brazilian former professional footballer who played as a midfielder.

== Career ==
Wellington Dias began his career at Flamengo, where he passed a test. However, he decided to return to his city because he missed his parents, starting his professional life at Caldas EC. He played for other clubs in the state of Goiás until joining Brasiliense in 2001, a club that gave him national recognition, being champion and top scorer of Brasileiro Série C and mainly for the runner-up campaign in the Copa do Brasil, which earned him harassment from Brazilian first division clubs.

In 2006 he suffered a serious injury and was no longer able to play the football he had previously played, playing again for lesser clubs.

== Honours ==
CRAC

- Campeonato Goiano Second Division: 2001

Brasiliense

- Campeonato Brasileiro Série B: 2004
- Campeonato Brasileiro Série C: 2002
- Campeonato Brasiliense: 2004, 2005, 2006, 2009

Individual

- 2002 Campeonato Brasileiro Série C top scorer: 11 goals (alongside Túlio Maravilha)
