= Letícia Teles =

Brazilian footballer (born 2000)

Personal information
- Full name: Letícia Teles da Silva
- Date of birth: 9 May 2000 (age 26)
- Place of birth: Rio Quente, Goiás, Brazil
- Height: 1.77 m (5 ft 10 in)
- Position: Defender

Team information
- Current team: Al Qadsiah
- Number: 33

Senior career*
Years	Team	Apps	(Gls)
2019	Aliança		
2019–2020	Goiás		
2021	Tiradentes-PI		
2022	Minas Brasília		
2023–2024	Red Bull Bragantino	52	(4)
2025–2026	Corinthians	34	(0)
2026–	Al Qadsiah	2	(0)
- * Club domestic league appearances and goals

Letícia Teles da Silva (born 9 May 2000) is a Brazilian professional footballer who plays as a centre-back for Saudi Women's Premier League (SWPL) club Al Qadsiah.

== Club career ==
Born in Rio Quente, Goiás, she began her career at local club Aliança before joining Goiás, with whom she won the Campeonato Goiano in 2019. She later had spells with Tiradentes-PI in 2021 and Minas Brasília in 2022.

=== Red Bull Bragantino: 2023–2024 ===
Teles joined Red Bull Bragantino ahead of the 2023 season. In her first season with the club, she made 24 appearances in her first season, helping the club win the Campeonato Brasileiro Feminino A2 and earn promotion to the Série A1. In 2024, following the club's promotion to the Série A1, Letícia remained a regular starter. She made 27 appearances and scored four goals during the season, reaching 50 appearances for the club during the Copa Paulista campaign as Bragantino reached the final for a second consecutive year.

=== Corinthians: 2025–2026 ===
On 6 January 2025, Teles joined Corinthians from Bragantino on a free transfer, signing a contract through 2027. She made her debut for the club on 9 March 2025, starting in a 3–0 win against Grêmio in the Supercopa do Brasil Feminina.

During the 2025 season, Teles established herself in the Corinthians defence and was part of the squad that won the Campeonato Brasileiro Feminino and Copa Libertadores Femenina. She made her Libertadores debut on 5 October in an 11–0 win over Always Ready, registering an assist. She ended the year with one goal and one assist. She remained a regular in 2026, making her final appearance for Corinthians on 26 August 2026 in a 6–2 victory over Taubaté. On 2 September 2026, she left the club to join Saudi Arabian side Al-Qadsiah.

=== Al Qadsiah: 2026–present ===
On 11 September 2026, the Khobar-based club unveiled Teles as a new signing. The transfer fee was reportedly between US$600,000 and US$800,000, making her the most expensive outgoing transfer in Corinthians women's history and the second-highest fee paid for a player in Brazilian women's football at the time behind Amanda Gutierres.
