= Fluminense (disambiguation) =

Fluminense refers to the Fluminense Football Club, a Brazilian football (soccer) club.

"Fluminense" may also refer to:

- Fluminense, a demonym for people from Rio de Janeiro (state), Brazil
  - Fluminense, a dialect of Brazilian Portuguese spoken in Rio de Janeiro state
- Fluminense de Feira Futebol Clube, a Brazilian football (soccer) club
- Fluminense Futebol Clube (Araguari), a Brazilian football (soccer) club
- Fluminense Esporte Clube, a Brazilian football (soccer) club
- Guaynabo Fluminense FC, a Puerto Rican football (soccer) club
- Campeonato Fluminense, a Brazilian football (soccer) competition
