= Augusto César =

Augusto César may refer to:

- Augusto César (footballer, born 1968), Brazilian football manager and former left-back
- Augusto César (footballer, born 1992), Brazilian football midfielder
