= Ricardo Luiz =

Brazilian footballer

Personal information
- Full name: Ricardo Luiz Gomes Mendes
- Date of birth: 2 April 1980 (age 46)
- Place of birth: Belo Horizonte, Brazil
- Height: 1.77 m (5 ft 10 in)
- Position: Defensive midfielder

Youth career
- América Mineiro

Senior career*
Years	Team	Apps	(Gls)
2001–2006	América Mineiro	78	(2)
2007	Novo Hamburgo	15	(0)
2008	Legião		
2009	Volta Redonda	3	(0)
2010	Guarani-MG		
2010	Fluminense-MG		
- * Club domestic league appearances and goals

Ricardo Luiz Gomes Mendes (born 2 April 1980), known as Ricardo Luiz or just Ricardo, is a Brazilian retired footballer who played as a defensive midfielder.

== Playing career ==
Born in Belo Horizonte, Ricardo made his senior debut with hometown side América Mineiro in 2001, winning the Campeonato Mineiro. He then suffered relegation from the Série A later in the year, and later became a backup option until leaving in 2006.

Ricardo subsequently played for Novo Hamburgo, Legião, Volta Redonda, Guarani-MG and Fluminense-MG before retiring in 2010, aged just 30.

== Post-playing career ==
In 2011, Ricardo returned to his first club América as a youth football coordinator. He later worked under the same role at Cruzeiro for five years, before being announced as the director of the youth categories at Cuiabá on 19 April 2021.

On 3 March 2022, Ricardo was named the youth football coordinator of Santos.

== Honours ==
América Mineiro

- Campeonato Mineiro: 2001
