= Jatobá (footballer, born 1963) =

Brazilian footballer

Personal information
- Full name: Carlos Roberto Jatobá
- Date of birth: 2 January 1963 (age 63)
- Place of birth: Peabiru, Brazil
- Position: Defender

Senior career*
Years	Team	Apps	(Gls)
1982–1983	Grêmio Maringá		
1984–1986	Pinheiros (PR)		
1986–1987	Corinthians	53	(7)
1987–1988	Celta de Vigo	0	(0)
1989	Coritiba		
1989	Atlético Goianiense	2	(0)
1990	América (MG)		
1990–1991	Spartak Subotica	1	(0)
1991	Catanduvense		
1991	Lokeren		
1992	Atlético Paranaense		
1993	Botafogo		
1993–1994	Atlético Paranaense		
- * Club domestic league appearances and goals

Carlos Roberto Jatobá, known as Jatobá (born 2 January 1963) is a Brazilian former professional footballer who played as a defender.

== Club career ==
Born in Peabiru, Jatobá initially played with Grêmio Maringá. However, it was during his spell at Pinheiros (PR) that he became noticed (Pinheiros will join Colorado in December 1989, and form Paraná Clube). He was declared the revelation of thechampionship and elected the best fourth defender of the Campeonato Paranaense and in September 1986 Corinthians brought him. and became part of what was known as the reactionary generation of Corinthians. In 1987–88 he joined recently promoted Spanish La Liga side Celta de Vigo but failed to make any appearance in the league. He returned to Brasil and played with Coritiba in 1989, and also Atlético Goianiense, Latter played with América Mineiro in 1990.

In the season 1990–91 he joined Serbian club FK Spartak Subotica along two other fellow Brazilians, Marquinhos and Oswaldo Monteiro, becoming the first Brazilians to play in the Yugoslav First League. Spartak was not performing as expected and after one league appearance Jatobá was back in Brasil joining Grêmio Catanduvense. But his return home was short, in 1991 he will be moving back to Europe again, this time to Belgium joining Lokeren.

In 1992, he joined Atlético Paranaense and played the following three years with them, except a half-season spell in 1993 with Botafogo.

After retiring, Jatobá became players agent and lives between Curitiba and Europe. His niece Simone Jatobá also became a professional footballer.

== Honors ==
Pinheiros

- Campeonato Paranaense: 1984

Coritiba

- Campeonato Paranaense: 1989

Botafogo

- Copa CONMEBOL: 1993
