= Vilson Ribeiro de Andrade =

Brazilian businessman

Vilson Ribeiro de Andrade (born in Peabiru, Paraná) is a Brazilian businessman. He is the ex-president of the Coritiba Football Club.

== Education ==
Ribeiro is the son of Eleutério Galdino de Andrade and Áurea Avani Ribeiro de Andrade. He graduated with a degree in law from the Faculdade de Direito de Curitiba, currently called UniCuritiba and did post-graduate work in Constitutional Law for PUC in São Paulo.

== Career ==
At the end of 2011, Andrade became the president of the Coritiba Football Club.
