= Osvaldo Monteiro =

Brazilian football manager and former player

Osvaldo Monteiro (born 12 December 1963) is a Brazilian football manager and former player.

== Career ==
Born in São Luís, Maranhão, played as striker and started being noticed while still a student by becoming member of the state of Maranhão junior team. Next, he was brought by Sport Club Internacional from Porto Alegre to their youth squad becoming, while there, Gaúcho state champion at youth level. Afterwards, he leaves Inter and returns to São Luís where he becomes professional playing at Tupan football club. He finished 1984 season as second top-scorer of the Campeonato Maranhense and was bought immediately by Moto Club for the next season. After a year and a half, he left Moto Club and moves abroad by signing with Portuguese side C.D. Nacional from Madeira. He plays one season in Portugal and returns to Brasil to join Vitória do Mar. But he will stay only four months back at São Luís, after which he was back to Europe this time to play in France in Ligue 2. This was the start of a period when he played in several countries. After France, he played in Turkey, Belgium, Yugoslavia, Morocco, Israel, United States, etc. While in Yugoslavia, he played along Jatobá and Marquinhos in Serbian club FK Spartak Subotica which was playing back then in the Yugoslav First League. He made two appearances and scored once in the 1990–91 Yugoslav First League.

After nine years abroad, he returned to São Luís, Brazil, and played with Sampaio Corrêa until the end of career. When he retired, he started his coaching career. He started as assistant manager at Expressinho, and then he was the main coach of Boa Vontade (2003) and São José de Ribamar (beginning of 2011 season). He also coached the youth teams of Uberlândia and Sampaio Corrêa. At Sampaio Corrêa, besides the youth teams, he also coached the main team on three occasions. He had been the assistant manager of Hércules Venzon at Sampaio Corrêa until Venzon resigned, and for a period in February 2008 Osvaldo Monteiro was the caretaker of the team, but by March 2008, he was back as assistant manager in the club. In June 2009 he was coaching for some time Americano a post he still held in July 2010. On 20 September 2010, he became vice-champion of the Copa FMF U- 18 with Sampaio Corrêa. By April 2016, he is coaching the teams of the OAB.

He is occasionally referred as Oswaldo Monteiro by the media.
