= Paulo Henrique Filho =

Brazilian footballer and coach

Personal information
- Full name: Paulo Henrique Souza de Oliveira Filho
- Date of birth: 18 August 1964
- Place of birth: Rio de Janeiro, Brazil
- Date of death: 13 February 2017 (aged 52)
- Place of death: Rio de Janeiro, Brazil
- Position: Forward

Youth career
- 1979–1984: Flamengo

Senior career*
Years	Team	Apps	(Gls)
1984–1985	Flamengo		
1985–1986	Olaria		
1986	America-RJ		
1986–1988	Braga	33	(5)
1988–1989	Penafiel	34	(3)
1989–1990	Puebla		
1991–1992	Inter de Lages		
1993	Avaí		
1994–1995	Muniz Freire		
1995–1996	Al-Ahli		
1997	Linhares		

Managerial career
- 2011: Flamengo U20
- 2012–2013: Flamengo (assistant)
- 2013: Serra Macaense
- 2014: Macaé
- 2015: Itapemirim
- * Club domestic league appearances and goals

Paulo Henrique Souza de Oliveira Filho (18 August 1964 — 13 February 2017), known as Paulo Henrique Filho or just Paulo Henrique, was a Brazilian football player and coach. He played as a forward mainly on the left side of the pitch, and was known for his association with Flamengo.

Paulo Henrique's father Paulo Henrique Souza de Oliveira and his son Henrique Lordelo also played professionally.

== Honours ==
=== Player ===
Flamengo

- Taça Rio: 1985

=== Manager ===
Flamengo

- Copa São Paulo de Futebol Júnior: 2011
- Torneio Octávio Pinto Guimarães: 2011
