= Simone Jatobá =

Brazilian footballer

- Jatobá at the 2000 Summer Olympics

Personal information
- Full name: Simone Gomes Jatobá
- Date of birth: 10 February 1981 (age 45)
- Place of birth: Maringá, Brazil
- Height: 1.69 m (5 ft 7 in)
- Positions: Defensive midfielder; defender

Senior career*
Years	Team	Apps	(Gls)
- Ponte Preta
- Santos
- Saad
2004–2005	Rayo Vallecano	10	(0)
2005–2010	Olympique Lyonnais	61	(5)
- Novo Mundo
2012	Energiya Voronezh	9	(3)
2014–2019	FC Metz	100	(9)

International career^{‡}
2000–2008	Brazil	57	(4)
Medal record
Representing Brazil
FIFA Women's World Cup
Silver medal – second place	2007 China	Team
Olympic Games – Women's Football
Silver medal – second place	2008 Beijing	Team competition
Pan American Games – Women's Football
Gold medal – first place	2007 Rio de Janeiro	Team competition
- * Club domestic league appearances and goals as of 22 April 2019 ‡ National team caps and goals as of 15 October 2008

Simone Gomes Jatobá (born 10 February 1981), commonly known as Simone, is a Brazilian football coach and former player. She was appointed coach of the Brazil women's national under-17 football team in August 2019.

== Club career ==
Simone began her career in Campeonato Brasileiro's Ponte Preta, Santos FC and Saad EC. In 2004, she moved to Rayo Vallecano in the Spanish Superliga, and next year she signed for Olympique Lyonnais, where she played for the next five years. She was a solid contributor to the squads that won the league in 2007 and 2008, as well as the squad that won the Challenge de France in 2008. In 2010, she returned to Brazil, playing for Novo Mundo FC, but two years later she signed for Energiya Voronezh in the Russian Championship.

In June 2019 38-year-old Simone left FC Metz after five seasons and retired from playing football.

== International career ==
In June 2000 Simone made her international debut in Brazil's 8–0 CONCACAF Women's Gold Cup win over Costa Rica at Hersheypark Stadium, Hershey, Pennsylvania. As a 19-year-old she played at the 2000 Sydney Olympics, where Brazil finished fourth after losing 2–0 to Germany in the bronze medal match at Sydney Football Stadium.

Simone has been a part of two World Cup squads. She was a part of the squad from 2003 that finished as quarter-finalists and the squad that finished in second place in China. She also participated in the 2008 Summer Olympics, again helping Brazil finish one spot short in second place.

She usually plays as a right winger for the Brazilian National Team.

== Personal life ==
Her uncle Carlos Roberto Jatobá was also a professional footballer.
