= Rickson (footballer) =

Brazilian footballer

Personal information
- Full name: Rickson Barbosa Sá da Conceição
- Date of birth: 4 March 1998 (age 28)
- Place of birth: Rio de Janeiro, Brazil
- Height: 1.80 m (5 ft 11 in)
- Position: Midfielder

Youth career
- –2019: Botafogo

Senior career*
Years	Team	Apps	(Gls)
2019–2021	Botafogo	19	(1)
2020	→ América Mineiro (loan)	10	(1)
2020–2021	→ Guarani (loan)	15	(0)
2021–2022	Atlético Goianiense	35	(2)
2022	CSA	7	(0)
2023	Vila Nova	6	(0)
- * Club domestic league appearances and goals as of 10 June 2023

Rickson Barbosa Sá da Conceição (born 4 March 1998), commonly known as Rickson, is a Brazilian footballer who plays as a midfielder.

== Career statistics ==
=== Club ===
As of 13 October 2021.

Club	Season	League			State league		Cup		Continental		Other		Total	
Club	Season	Division	Apps	Goals	Apps	Goals	Apps	Goals	Apps	Goals	Apps	Goals	Apps	Goals
Botafogo	2019	Série A	6	0	3	0	1	0	0	0	—		10	0
Botafogo	2020	Série A	0	0	0	0	0	0	—		—		0	0
Botafogo	2021	Série B	2	0	8	1	1	0	—		—		11	1
Botafogo	Total		8	0	11	1	2	0	0	0	—		21	1
América Mineiro (loan)	2020	Série B	5	0	5	1	1	0	—		—		11	1
Guarani (loan)	2020	Série B	15	0	—		—		—		—		15	0
Atlético Goianiense	2021	Série A	4	0	—		—		—		—		4	0
Career total			32	0	16	2	3	0	0	0	0	0	51	2

== Honours ==
Atlético Goianiense

- Campeonato Goiano: 2022
