= Paulo Henrique (footballer, born 1943) =

Brazilian footballer

Personal information
- Full name: Paulo Henrique Souza de Oliveira
- Date of birth: 5 January 1943 (age 83)
- Place of birth: Macaé, Brazil
- Position: Left-back

Team information
- Current team: Macaé Esporte (head coach)

Senior career*
Years	Team	Apps	(Gls)
1961	Botafogo		
1961–1972	Flamengo		
1973	Avaí		
1974	Bahia		
1974	Bonsucesso		

International career
1966–1968	Brazil	10	(0)

Managerial career
- 1978–1979: Goytacaz
- 2007–2009: Quissamã
- 2010–2013: Flamengo (assistant)
- 2013: América de Três Rios
- 2017–2018: Goytacaz
- 2022–: Macaé Esporte
- * Club domestic league appearances and goals

Paulo Henrique Souza de Oliveira (born 5 January 1943), usually called Paulo Henrique, is a Brazilian former professional football player and the manager of Macaé Esporte. He played as a left-back, and represented the Brazil national team at the 1966 FIFA World Cup.

His son Paulo Henrique Filho and his grandson Henrique Lordelo also played professionally.

== Honours ==
=== Players ===
Flamengo

- Torneio Rio-São Paulo: 1961
- Campeonato Carioca: 1963, 1965, 1972
- Torneio do Povo: 1972

Avaí

- Campeonato Catarinense: 1973

=== Manager ===
Goytacaz

- Campeonato Carioca Série B1: 2017
