= Da Silva (footballer, born 2001) =

Brazilian footballer

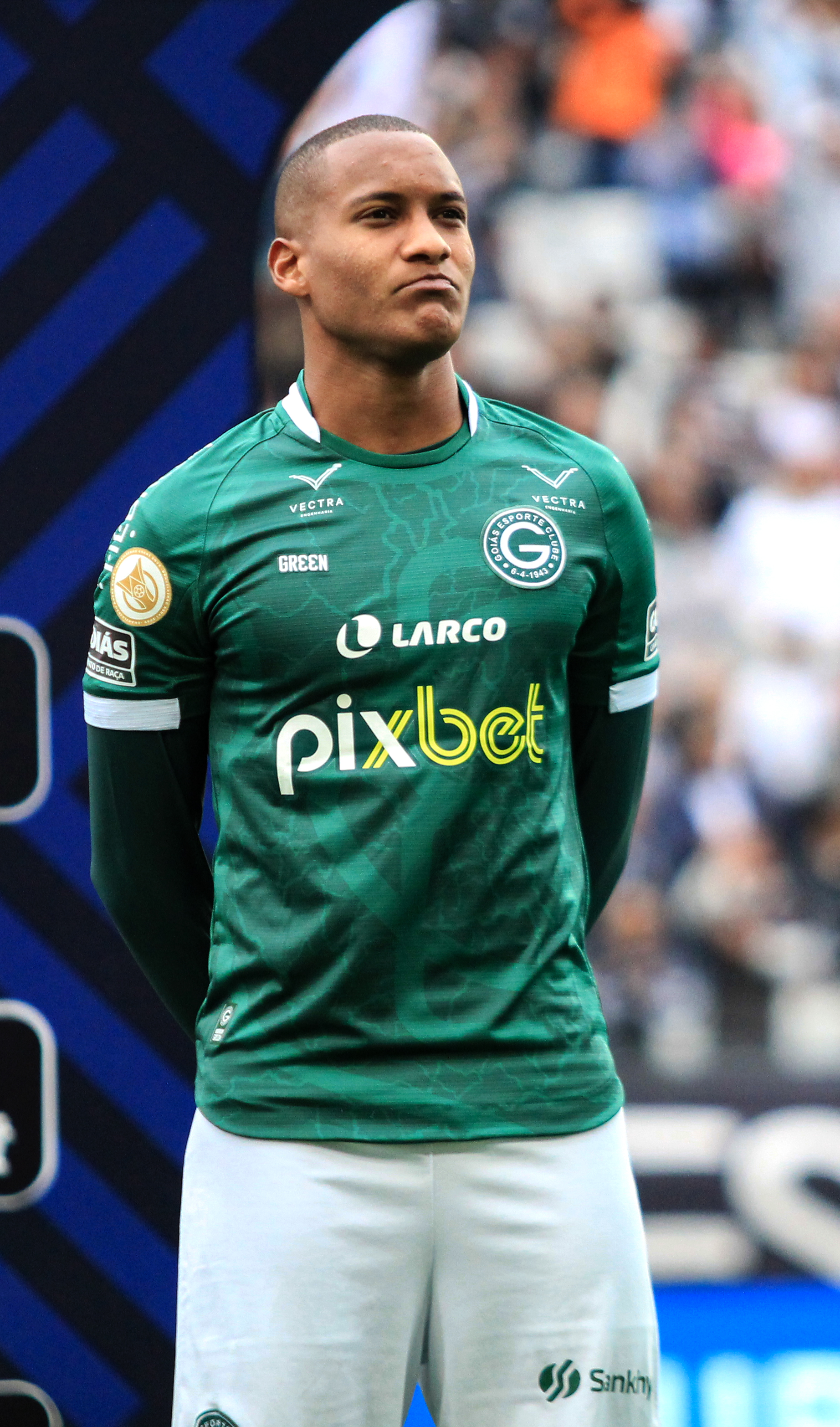

Personal information
- Full name: João Vitor Vallony da Silva
- Date of birth: 7 February 2001 (age 25)
- Place of birth: Goiânia, Brazil
- Height: 1.92 m (6 ft 4 in)
- Position: Centre back

Team information
- Current team: Red Bull Bragantino

Youth career
- 2014–2020: Goiás

Senior career*
Years	Team	Apps	(Gls)
2021–2023	Goiás	13	(2)
2021	→ Aparecidense (loan)	0	(0)
2023	→ Londrina (loan)	7	(0)
2023–	Red Bull Bragantino	0	(0)
- * Club domestic league appearances and goals as of 8 July 2023

João Vitor Vallony da Silva (born 7 February 2001), commonly known as Da Silva, is a Brazilian professional footballer who plays as a central defender for Red Bull Bragantino.

== Club career ==
Born in Goiânia, Da Silva was a youth graduate of Goiás. He made his first team debut on 28 January 2021, starting in a 3–2 Campeonato Goiano away win over Goianésia.

On 28 May 2021, Da Silva was loaned to Aparecidense for the remainder of the year. He struggled with injuries during his spell, and returned to his parent club without making any appearance.

Upon returning, Da Silva appeared sparingly in the 2022 Campeonato Goiano, scoring his first senior goal on 20 February in a 3–0 away victory over Jataiense. On 6 April 2022, he renewed his contract until 2024.

Da Silva made his Série A debut on 10 April 2022, starting in a 0–3 away loss against Coritiba.

== Career statistics ==
As of 10 April 2022

Club	Season	League			State League		Cup		Continental		Other		Total	
Club	Season	Division	Apps	Goals	Apps	Goals	Apps	Goals	Apps	Goals	Apps	Goals	Apps	Goals
Goiás	2020	Série A	0	0	1	0	0	0	—		—		1	0
Goiás	2021	Série B	0	0	0	0	0	0	—		—		0	0
Goiás	2022	Série A	1	0	5	1	0	0	—		—		6	1
Goiás	Total		1	0	6	1	0	0	—		—		7	1
Aparecidense (loan)	2021	Série D	0	0	—		—		—		—		0	0
Career total			1	0	6	1	0	0	0	0	0	0	7	1
