= Arthur Henrique (footballer, born 1994) =

Brazilian footballer

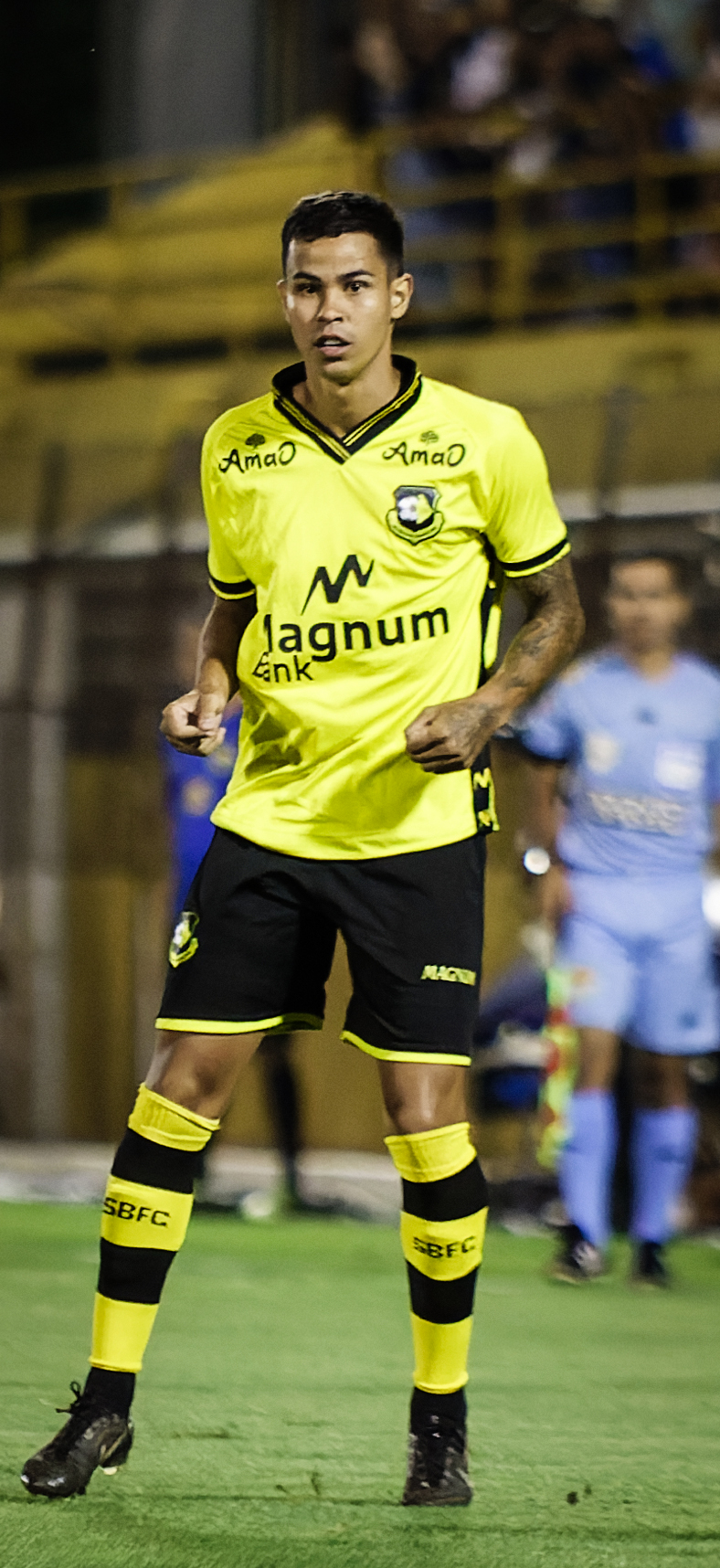
- Arthur Henrique with São Bernardo in 2023

Personal information
- Full name: Arthur Henrique Peixoto Santos
- Date of birth: 17 May 1994 (age 32)
- Place of birth: São Paulo, Brazil
- Height: 1.78 m (5 ft 10 in)
- Position: Left back

Team information
- Current team: Figueirense
- Number: 6

Youth career
- 2011–2013: São Paulo
- 2014: América de Natal

Senior career*
Years	Team	Apps	(Gls)
2014–2015	América de Natal	24	(0)
2016	Flamengo	0	(0)
2016	América de Natal	5	(0)
2017	Atlético Tubarão	4	(0)
2018–2021	Ferroviária	37	(0)
2019–2020	→ Gil Vicente (loan)	18	(0)
2021	→ Atlético Goianiense (loan)	10	(1)
2022–2023	Atlético Goianiense	33	(0)
2023	→ São Bernardo (loan)	36	(0)
2024–2025	São Bernardo	32	(0)
2026–	Figueirense	23	(1)
- * Club domestic league appearances and goals as of 10 November 2026

Arthur Henrique Peixoto Santos (born 17 May 1994), known as Arthur Henrique, is a Brazilian professional footballer who plays as a left back for Figueirense.

== Career ==
On 2 July 2019 it was confirmed, that Henrique had joined Portuguese club Gil Vicente FC.

== Honours ==
América de Natal

- Campeonato Potiguar: 2015

Atlético Goianiense

- Campeonato Goiano: 2022
