= Wanderson (footballer, born February 1991) =

Brazilian footballer

Personal information
- Full name: Wanderson Santos Pereira
- Date of birth: 7 February 1991 (age 35)
- Place of birth: Vitória da Conquista, Brazil
- Height: 1.86 m (6 ft 1 in)
- Position: Centre back

Team information
- Current team: Avaí
- Number: 34

Youth career
- 2008–2011: Internacional

Senior career*
Years	Team	Apps	(Gls)
2011–2012	Francana	19	(2)
2012	Montes Claros		
2012–2014	Sertãozinho	24	(1)
2013–2014	→ Corinthians (loan)	0	(0)
2014	Treze	5	(0)
2015	São Bento	14	(1)
2015	Criciúma	33	(3)
2016	Ferroviária	13	(1)
2016–2019	Athletico Paranaense	60	(2)
2019	→ Shimizu S-Pulse (loan)	2	(0)
2019–2022	Bahia	13	(0)
2020–2021	→ Fortaleza (loan)	15	(0)
2021–2022	→ Atlético Goianiense (loan)	66	(1)
2023	América Mineiro	2	(0)
2024	Mirassol	3	(0)
2024	CRB	8	(0)
2025–	Avaí	8	(0)
- * Club domestic league appearances and goals as of 17 December 2025

Wanderson Santos Pereira (born 7 February 1991), simply known as Wanderson, is a Brazilian footballer who plays mainly as a centre back for Avaí.

== Club career ==
Born in Vitória da Conquista, Bahia, Wanderson represented Internacional as a youth. He made his debut as a senior with Francana, in 2011.

In 2012 Wanderson moved to Montes Claros EC, but returned to the São Paulo state shortly after, joining Sertãozinho. After impressing with the latter in 2013 Campeonato Paulista Série A3, he signed for Corinthians.

Wanderson remained at Timão for nearly a year, but failed to make a single appearance for the club, and on 18 August 2014 moved to Treze. In November, he agreed to a contract with São Bento ahead of 2015 Campeonato Paulista.

On 28 April 2015 Wanderson joined Série B club Criciúma. An undisputed starter for the club, he scored three goals in 33 appearances before moving to Ferroviária on 15 December.

On 16 May 2016 Wanderson moved to Série A club Atlético Paranaense. He made his top tier debut on 1 June, coming on as a substitute for Cleberson in a 0–1 away loss against former club Internacional.

== Honours ==
Atlético Paranaense

- Copa Sudamericana: 2018

Bahia

- Campeonato Baiano: 2020

Fortaleza

- Campeonato Cearense: 2021

Atlético Goianiense

- Campeonato Goiano: 2022

Avaí

- Campeonato Catarinense: 2025
