= Ceres Esporte Clube =

Football club in the Ceres, state of Goiás, Brazil

Ceres
- Full name: Ceres Esporte Clube
- Founded: July 16, 1947
- Ground: Centro Olímpico, Ceres, Goiás state, Brazil
- Capacity: 25,000
- President: Cleidson Alves Pequeno
- League: Campeonato Goiano (Third Division) (2017)
| Home colours | Away colours |

Ceres Esporte Clube is a football club in the city of Ceres, in the state of Goiás who has already disputed the three divisions of Campeonato Goiano.

== History ==
Founded on July 16, 1947, in the city of Ceres in the state of Goiás, the club is affiliated to Federação Goiana de Futebol and the last professional championship disputed by the club was in 2017, when it disputed the Campeonato Goiano (Third Division).

== Honours ==
- Campeonato Goiano Second Division
  - Winners (3): 1966, 1968, 1992
- Campeonato Goiano do Interior
  - Winners (2): 1959, 1964
