= Augusto César (footballer, born 1968) =

Brazilian football manager and former player

Personal information
- Full name: Augusto Pedro de Sousa
- Date of birth: 5 November 1968 (age 57)
- Place of birth: Brasília, Brazil
- Height: 1.79 m (5 ft 10 1/2 in)
- Positions: Left back; midfielder

Senior career*
Years	Team	Apps	(Gls)
1987–1988	Gama		
1988	Vasco da Gama		
1988	→ America-RJ (loan)		
1989–1990	Gama		
1990–1991	Belenenses		
1991	Pires do Rio		
1992–1996	Goiás	104	(7)
1997–1999	Portuguesa	111	(7)
1999–2000	Corinthians	18	(0)
2000	→ Botafogo (loan)		
2000	América Mineiro	20	(0)
2001	Botafogo	2	(0)
2001–2002	Kashima Antlers	42	(9)
2003–2005	Kawasaki Frontale	105	(30)
2006	Brasiliense		
2007	Gama		
2008	Paranoá		
2009	Brasília		

Managerial career
- 2009–2010: Brasília
- 2010: Gama U20
- 2011: Botafogo-DF
- 2012: Gama
- 2012–2016: Goiás U20
- 2015: Goiás (interim)
- 2016: Pires do Rio U20
- 2017: Sobradinho
- 2017–2020: Goiás U20
- 2018: Goiás (interim)
- 2020–2021: Goiás
- 2022: Nacional de Muriaé
- 2022: Uruaçu
- 2023: Morrinhos
- * Club domestic league appearances and goals

Augusto Pedro de Sousa (born 5 November 1968), known as Augusto César or simply Augusto, is a Brazilian football coach and former player who played as either a left back or a midfielder.

== Playing career ==
Born in Brasília, Federal District, Augusto César was spotted by Vasco da Gama at the age of 19, playing the 1988 Campeonato Carioca on loan at America-RJ. He then represented Gama and Pires do Rio before joining Goiás in 1992.

Augusto César moved to Portuguesa in 1997, as a replacement to Zé Roberto. In July 1999, he agreed to a contract with Corinthians, but was rarely used at the latter club.

Augusto César was sent out on loan to Botafogo in February 2000, but returned to Corinthians in the following month after having paperwork problems; the issue was later solved, but he still featured sparingly. He subsequently represented América Mineiro in that year before returning to Bota in 2001; he would appear rarely for the club again, however.

In June 2001, Augusto César moved abroad, after signing for Kashima Antlers. He only returned to Brazil in 2006 with Brasiliense, after spending three seasons at Kawasaki Frontale.

Augusto César returned to his former side Gama in 2008, and subsequently played for Paranoá and Brasília before retiring in 2009, aged 40.

== Managerial career ==
Shortly after retiring, Augusto César took up coaching in his last club Brasília, in the 2009 Série D. Ahead of the 2011 season, after managing Gama's under-20 squad, he was appointed in charge of Botafogo-DF, managing Túlio Maravilha while at the club.

Dismissed by Botafogo in April 2011, Augusto César took over former side Gama for the 2012 campaign, but was sacked in March of that year.

On 27 September 2012, Augusto César rejoined another club he represented as a player, Goiás, as an under-20 manager. He was also an interim manager of the main squad in the 2015 campaign, before the arrival of Julinho Camargo.

Augusto César was relieved of his duties by Goiás on 12 January 2016, after a poor performance in the year's Copa São Paulo de Futebol Júnior. In September 2017, after working at Pires do Rio's under-20 side and Sobradinho, he returned to Goiás and their under-20 squad, again as manager.

Interim of the first team for a short period during the 2018 season, Augusto César was definitely appointed manager of the main squad on 17 November 2020, after the dismissal of Enderson Moreira.

== Career statistics ==
Club	Season	League			State League		Cup		Continental		Other		Total	
Club	Season	Division	Apps	Goals	Apps	Goals	Apps	Goals	Apps	Goals	Apps	Goals	Apps	Goals
Goiás	1992	Série A	18	2	9	2	2	0	—		—		29	4
Goiás	1993	Série A	13	1	0	0	—		—		—		13	1
Goiás	1994	Série B	14	1	2	0	2	0	—		—		18	1
Goiás	1995	Série A	15	1	2	0	1	0	—		—		18	0
Goiás	1996	Série A	23	0	8	0	3	1	—		—		34	1
Goiás	Total		83	5	21	2	8	1	—		—		112	8
Portuguesa	1997	Série A	25	3	20	1	4	1	2 (Note: Appearance(s) in Copa CONMEBOL)	0	—		51	5
Portuguesa	1998	Série A	27	1	18	1	3	1	—		—		48	3
Portuguesa	1999	Série A	0	0	21	1	4	1	—		—		25	2
Portuguesa	Total		52	4	59	3	11	3	2	0	—		124	10
Corinthians	1999	Série A	18	0	—		—		1 (Note: Appearance(s) in Copa Mercosur)	0	—		19	0
Corinthians	2000	Série A	0	0	0	0	—		3 (Note: Appearance(s) in Copa Libertadores)	0	5 (Note: Appearance(s) in Torneio Rio – São Paulo)	1	8	1
Corinthians	Total		18	0	0	0	—		4	0	1	1	27	1
América Mineiro	2000	Série A	20	0	—		—		—		—		20	0
Botafogo	2001	Série A	0	0	2	0	3	0	—		1	0	6	0
Kashima Antlers	2001	J1 League	13	5	—		3	1	—		4 (Note: Appearance(s) in J.League Cup)	0	20	6
Kashima Antlers	2002	J1 League	29	4	—		5	1	—		9	1	43	6
Kashima Antlers	Total		42	9	—		8	2	—		13	1	63	12
Kawasaki Frontale	2003	J2 League	41	17	—		0	0	—		—		41	17
Kawasaki Frontale	2004	J2 League	31	8	—		0	0	—		—		31	8
Kawasaki Frontale	2005	J1 League	33	5	—		1	0	—		5	1	39	6
Kawasaki Frontale	Total		105	30	—		1	0	—		5	1	111	31

== Honours ==
=== Player ===
Gama

- Campeonato Brasiliense: 1990

Goiás

- Campeonato Goiano: 1994, 1996

Corinthians

- Campeonato Brasileiro Série A: 1999
- FIFA Club World Cup: 2000

Kashima Antlers

- J1 League: 2001
- J.League Cup: 2002

Kawasaki Frontale

- J2 League: 2004

Brasiliense

- Campeonato Brasiliense: 2006
