= Campeonato Goiano Second Division =

Football league in Goiás, Brazil

- Organising body: FGF
- Founded: 1959; 67 years ago
- Country: Brazil
- State: Goiás
- Level on pyramid: 2
- Promotion to: Campeonato Goiano
- Relegation to: 3rd Division
- Current champions: Anapolina (2nd title) (2025)
- Most championships: Rio Verde (6 titles)
- Website: FGF Official website

The Campeonato Goiano Segunda Divisão, also called Divisão de Acesso, is the second tier of the professional state football league in the Brazilian state of Goiás. It is run by the Goiás Football Federation (FGF).

== List of champions ==
Season	Champions	Runners-up
1959	Ferroviário (1)	Sírio Libanês
1960	Sírio Libanês (1)	Goianás
1961	Santa Rita (1)	São Luiz
1962–1963	Not held	
1964	Riachuelo (1)	Santa Rita
1965	CRAC (1)	Umuarama
1966	Ceres (1)	Buriti
1967	Nacional de Itumbiara (1)	Goiás de Itumbiara
1968	Ceres (2)	Rio Verde
1969	Rio Verde (1)	São Luís
1970–1979	Not held	
1980	Monte Cristo (1)	CRAC
1981	Nacional de Itumbiara (2)	Ceres
1982	Rio Verde (2)	Santa Helena
1983	Nacional de Itumbiara (3)	Ceres
1984	Goiatuba (1)	Monte Cristo
1985	Goianésia (1)	América de Morrinhos
1986	Santa Helena (1)	CRAC
1987	América de Morrinhos (1)	Novo Horizonte
1988	Quirinópolis (1)	Mineiros
1989	Rio Verde (3)	Jataiense
1990	Anápolis (1)	Pires do Rio
1991	Piracanjuba (1)	Itumbiara
1992	Ceres (3)	Inhumas
1993	Rio Verde (4)	Goianésia
1994	Buritialegrense (1)	Uruaçu
1995	Bom Jesus (1)	Aparecidense
1996	Pires do Rio (1)	São Luís
1997	Goiatuba (2)	Caldas
1998	Goiânia (1)	Rioverdense
1999	Aparecida (1)	Goianésia
2000	Vila Nova (1)	Grêmio Inhumense
2001	CRAC (2)	Goiatuba
2002	Jataiense (1)	Anápolis
2003	CRAC (3)	Itumbiara
2004	Mineiros (1)	Aparecidense
2005	Atlético Goianiense (1)	Rioverdense
2006	Goiânia (2)	Trindade
2007	Novo Horizonte (1)	Anápolis
2008	Santa Helena (2)	Aparecidense
2009	Morrinhos (1)	Canedense
2010	Aparecidense (1)	Goianésia
2011	Rio Verde (5)	Itumbiara
2012	Anápolis (2)	Grêmio Anápolis
2013	Anapolina (1)	Trindade
2014	Caldas Novas (1)	Itumbiara
2015	Vila Nova (2)	Anápolis
2016	Rio Verde (6)	Iporá
2017	Grêmio Anápolis (1)	Anapolina
2018	CRAC (4)	Novo Horizonte
2019	Jaraguá (1)	Anápolis
2020	Jataiense (2)	Itumbiara
2021	Goiatuba (3)	Morrinhos
2022	Inhumas (1)	Goiânia
2023	Goiatuba (4)	Jataiense
2024	Inhumas (2)	ABECAT
2025	Anapolina (2)	Centro Oeste

=== Notes ===
- Sírio Libanês changed their name to Botafogo.
- Grêmio Inhumense has moved from Inhumas to Anápolis, and changed their name to Grêmio Anápolis.

== Titles by team ==
Teams in bold still active.

Rank	Club	Winners	Winning years
1	**Rio Verde**	6	1969, 1982, 1989, 1993, 2011, 2016
2	**CRAC**	4	1965, 2001, 2003, 2018
2	**Goiatuba**	4	1984, 1997, 2021, 2023
3	Ceres	3	1966, 1968, 1992
3	Nacional de Itumbiara	3	1967, 1981, 1983
6	**Anapolina**	2	2013, 2025
6	**Anápolis**	2	1990, 2012
6	**Goiânia**	2	1998, 2006
6	**Inhumas**	2	2022, 2024
6	**Jataiense**	2	2002, 2020
6	**Santa Helena**	2	1986, 2008
6	**Vila Nova**	2	2000, 2015
13	**América de Morrinhos**	1	1987
13	**Aparecida**	1	1999
13	**Aparecidense**	1	2010
13	**Atlético Goianiense**	1	2005
13	Bom Jesus	1	1995
13	Botafogo	1	1960
13	Buritialegrense	1	1994
13	**Caldas Novas**	1	2014
13	Ferroviário	1	1959
13	**Goianésia**	1	1985
13	**Grêmio Anápolis**	1	2017
13	**Jaraguá**	1	2019
13	**Mineiros**	1	2004
13	**Monte Cristo**	1	1980
13	**Morrinhos**	1	2009
13	**Novo Horizonte**	1	2007
13	Piracanjuba	1	1991
13	Pires do Rio	1	1996
13	Quirinópolis	1	1988
13	Riachuelo	1	1964
13	Santa Rita	1	1961

=== By city ===
City	Championships	Clubs
Goiânia	10	Goiânia (2), Vila Nova (2), Atlético Goianiense (1), Botafogo (1), Ferroviário (1), Monte Cristo (1), Riachuelo (1), Santa Rita (1)
Rio Verde	6	Rio Verde (6)
Anápolis	5	Anápolis (2), Anapolina (2), Grêmio Anápolis (1)
Catalão	4	CRAC (4)
Goiatuba	4	Goiatuba (4)
Ceres	3	Ceres (3)
Itumbiara	3	Nacional (3)
Aparecida de Goiânia	2	Aparecida (1), Aparecidense (1)
Inhumas	2	Inhumas (2)
Jataí	2	Jataiense (2)
Morrinhos	2	América (1), Morrinhos (1)
Santa Helena de Goiás	2	Santa Helena (2)
Bom Jesus de Goiás	1	Bom Jesus (1)
Buriti Alegre	1	Buritialegrense (1)
Caldas Novas	1	Caldas Novas (1)
Goianésia	1	Goianésia (1)
Ipameri	1	Novo Horizonte (1)
Jaraguá	1	Jaraguá (1)
Mineiros	1	Mineiros (1)
Piracanjuba	1	Piracanjuba (1)
Pires do Rio	1	Pires do Rio (1)
Quirinópolis	1	Quirinópolis (1)
