= Trindade Atlético Clube =

Trindade
- Full name: Trindade Atlético Clube
- Nickname: Tacão
- Founded: 15 June 2005; 20 years ago
- Ground: Estádio Abrão Manoel da Costa, Trindade, Goiás state, Brazil
- Capacity: 3,000
- President: Amauri Rios
- Head Coach: Wladimir Araújo
- League: Campeonato Goiano Segunda Divisão
- 2024: Goiano Segunda Divisão, 4th of 8
Home colours	Away colours

Trindade Atlético Clube, commonly known as Trindade, is a Brazilian football club based in Trindade, Goiás state.

== History ==
The club was founded on June 15, 2005. They won the Campeonato Goiano Third Level in 2005.

== Honours ==
- Campeonato Goiano Third Division
  - Winners (1): 2005

== Stadium ==
Trindade Atlético Clube play their home games at Estádio Abrão Manoel da Costa. The stadium has a maximum capacity of 3,000 people.
