= Aliança Futebol Clube =

Aliança
- Full name: Aliança Futebol Clube
- Founded: 24 October 1958; 66 years ago
- Ground: Olímpico de Goiânia
- Capacity: 13,500
- President: Patrícia Menezes
Home colours	Away colours

Aliança Futebol Clube, commonly known as Aliança or Aliança de Goiânia, is a Brazilian football club based in Goiânia, Goiás. The club is currently dedicated to the practice of women's football.

== History ==
The history of Aliança Futebol Clube begins on 24 October 1958, when friends Cherife Oscar Abrão and Ibsen Henrique de Castro decided to found a sports organization at Café Estrela in Campinas, Goiás. Soon, the name of the organization was decided: Aliança Futebol Clube, with Cherife himself as president. In 1962, Aliança joined the Federação Goiana de Futebol (FGF), thus beginning to compete in men's football competitions. After 1985, Aliança withdrew from competitions due to document failures, thus withdrawing from the Campeonato Goiano dispute.

Aliança's return took place on 5 October 1990 and since then the club has competed in women's football competitions throughout Brazil. Since then, the club has won the state championship 16 times, holding the record for most titles. It also frequently participates in national competitions, most notably the inaugural Brasileiro Feminino, held in 2013. Due to recent results, a rivalry with Vila Nova has been intensifying.

Due to the CBF's requirement for men's clubs in Série A to have women's teams, Goiás Esporte Clube partnered with Aliança during the years the team was in the first division.

== Stadium ==
Aliança plays its matches at Estádio Olímpico Pedro Ludovico, and carries out his training at the SINT-IFESgo Club.

== Honours ==
=== Women's football ===
- Campeonato Goiano: (16): 1994, 1995, 1996, 1998, 1999, 2000, 2004, 2006, 2008, 2009, 2010, 2014, 2015, 2018, 2022, 2023
