= Matheuzinho (footballer, born 1993) =

Brazilian footballer

Personal information
- Full name: Matheus Cotulio Bossa
- Date of birth: 21 February 1993 (age 33)
- Place of birth: Penápolis, Brazil
- Height: 1.71 m (5 ft 7 in)
- Position: Attacking midfielder

Youth career
- 2004–2006: Marília
- 2006–2009: São Paulo
- 2009–2012: Corinthians
- 2012: → Flamengo-SP (loan)

Senior career*
Years	Team	Apps	(Gls)
2012–2014	Corinthians	1	(0)
2012–2013	→ Bragantino (loan)	22	(3)
2014	→ Audax (loan)	10	(2)
2014	→ Guaratinguetá (loan)	8	(0)
2015–2017	Audax	28	(3)
2015–2016	→ Estoril (loan)	10	(0)
2018	FC Juárez	14	(1)
2019–2020	Atlético Goianiense	82	(17)
2020–2021	Juventude	25	(4)
2022–2023	Vila Nova	54	(10)
2023	Al-Merrikh SC	6	(0)
2023–2024	América de Natal	17	(3)
2025–	Capital-DF	29	(10)
- * Club domestic league appearances and goals as of 26 March 2026

Matheus Cotulio Bossa (born 21 February 1993), known as Matheuzinho or simply Matheus, is a Brazilian footballer who plays as an attacking midfielder. He's currently a free agent.

== Club career ==
Born in Penápolis, São Paulo, Matheuzinho joined Corinthians' youth setup in 2009, aged 16, after starting it out at São Paulo. In 2012, after a short loan stint at Flamengo de Guarulhos, he was promoted to the main squad in 2012 by manager Tite.

On 15 April 2012 Matheuzinho played his first match as a professional, coming on as a late substitute for Vitor Júnior in a 2–1 away win against Ponte Preta for the Campeonato Paulista championship. He subsequently served loans at Bragantino, Grêmio Osasco Audax and Guaratinguetá before being released in 2014.

In 2015 Matheuzinho returned to Audax, now in a permanent deal. On 18 July, after being a regular starter for the club, he was loaned to Primeira Liga side G.D. Estoril Praia in a season-long deal.

On 1 January 2019, Matheuzinho signed for Atlético Goianiense.

== Career statistics ==
As of 29 November 2021

Club	Season	League			State League		Cup		Continental		Other		Total	
Club	Season	Division	Apps	Goals	Apps	Goals	Apps	Goals	Apps	Goals	Apps	Goals	Apps	Goals
Corinthians	2012	Série A	0	0	1	0	0	0	—		—		1	0
Corinthians	2013	Série A	0	0	0	0	—		—		—		0	0
Corinthians	Total		0	0	1	0	0	0	—		—		1	0
Bragantino (loan)	2012	Série B	10	2	—		—		—		—		10	2
Bragantino (loan)	2013	Série B	0	0	12	1	0	0	—		—		12	1
Bragantino (loan)	Total		10	2	12	1	0	0	—		—		22	3
Audax (loan)	2014	Paulista	—		10	2	—		—		—		10	2
Guaratinguetá (loan)	2014	Série C	8	0	—		—		—		—		8	0
Audax	2015	Paulista	—		14	3	—		—		—		14	3
Audax	2017	Série D	5	0	4	0	0	0	—		2 (Note: Appearance(s) in 2017 Copa Paulista)	0	11	0
Audax	Total		5	0	18	3	0	0	—		2	0	25	3
Estoril (loan)	2015–16	Primeira Liga	7	0	—		0	0	—		1 (Note: Appearance(s) in Taça da Liga)	0	8	0
Juárez	2017–18	Ascenso MX	2	0	—		4	0	—		—		6	0
Juárez	2018–19	Ascenso MX	7	0	—		2	1	—		—		9	1
Juárez	Total		9	0	—		6	1	—		—		15	1
Atlético Goianiense	2019	Série B	29	2	16	7	4	1	—		—		49	10
Atlético Goianiense	2020	Série A	17	1	8	5	8	1	—		—		33	7
Atlético Goianiense	Total		46	3	24	12	12	2	—		—		82	17
Juventude	2020	Série B	14	3	—		—		—		—		14	3
Juventude	2021	Série A	1	0	8	1	2	0	—		—		11	1
Juventude	Total		15	3	8	1	2	0	—		—		25	4
Vila Nova	2022	Série B	0	0	4	0	0	0	—		0	0	4	0
Career total			100	8	77	19	20	3	—		3	0	200	30
