= Henrique Lordelo =

Brazilian footballer (born 2000)

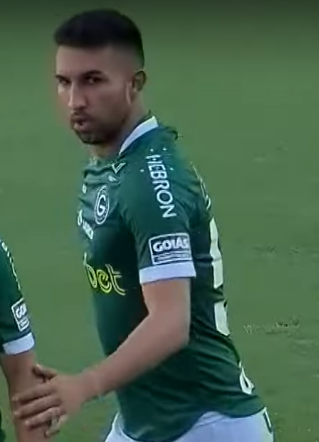
- Henrique Lordelo with Goiás in 2022

Personal information
- Full name: Henrique Lordelo Souza de Oliveira
- Date of birth: 16 June 2000 (age 26)
- Place of birth: Rio de Janeiro, Brazil
- Height: 1.76 m (5 ft 9 in)
- Position: Defensive midfielder

Team information
- Current team: São Bernardo
- Number: 55

Youth career
- 2010–2019: Flamengo
- 2019–2020: Goiás

Senior career*
Years	Team	Apps	(Gls)
2020–2022	Goiás	33	(0)
2023–	São Bernardo	24	(1)
- * Club domestic league appearances and goals as of 19:23, 10 April 2022 (UTC)

Henrique Lordelo Souza de Oliveira (born 16 June 2000), known as Henrique Lordelo, is a Brazilian professional footballer who plays as a defensive midfielder for São Bernardo.

== Club career ==
Born in Rio de Janeiro, Lordelo joined Flamengo's youth setup at the age of ten. In August 2019, he left the club and signed a three-and-a-half-year contract with fellow Série A side Goiás, initially assigned to the under-20s.

Lordelo made his professional – and top tier – debut on 26 November 2020, coming on as a second-half substitute for Daniel Villalva in 1–1 away draw against Fortaleza.

== Personal life ==
Lordelo comes from a family of footballers. His father Paulo Henrique Filho was a forward, while his grandfather Paulo Henrique was a defender; both represented Flamengo.

== Career statistics ==
As of 3 August 2023

Club	Season	League			State League		Cup		Continental		Other		Total	
Club	Season	Division	Apps	Goals	Apps	Goals	Apps	Goals	Apps	Goals	Apps	Goals	Apps	Goals
Goiás	2020	Série A	13	0	1	0	0	0	0	0	—		14	0
Goiás	2021	Série B	0	0	8	0	1	0	—		—		9	0
Goiás	2022	Série A	5	0	6	0	0	0	—		—		11	0
Goiás	Total		18	0	15	0	1	0	0	0	0	0	34	0
São Bernardo	2023	Série C	11	0	13	1	1	0	—		—		25	1
Career total			29	0	28	1	2	0	0	0	0	0	59	1
