= Campeonato Goiano de Futebol Feminino =

Women's football league in Goiás, Brazil

- Founded: 1983
- Country: Brazil
- Confederation: FGF
- Promotion to: Brasileiro Série A3
- Current champions: Vila Nova (3rd title) (2025)
- Most championships: Aliança (17 titles)
- Current: 2026

The Campeonato Goiano de Futebol Feminino is the women's football state championship of Goiás state, and is contested since 1983.

== List of champions ==
Following is the list with all recognized titles of Campeonato Goiano Feminino:

Season	Champions	Runners-up
1983	Ponto Frio (1)	
1984	Ponto Frio (2)	
1985–1989	Not held	
1990	Atlético Goianiense (1)	
1991	Atlético Goianiense (2)	
1992	Atlético Goianiense (3)	Goiânia
1993	Atlético Goianiense (4)	
1994	Aliança (1)	Goiânia
1995	Aliança (2)	Campineira
1996	Aliança (3)	Goiânia
1997	Goiânia (1)	Aliança
1998	Aliança (4)	Goiânia
1999	Aliança (5)	Goiânia
2000	Aliança (6)	Goiânia
2001	Goiânia (2)	Aliança
2002	Goiânia (3)	
2003	Goiânia (4)	Aliança
2004	Aliança (7)	Goiânia
2005	Not held	
2006	Aliança (8)	Goiânia
2007	Not held	
2008	Aliança (9)	Goiânia
2009	Aliança (10)	Goiânia
2010	Aliança (11)	Goiânia
2011	Atletas de Jesus (1)	Aliança
2012	Clube Jaó (1)	Goiânia
2013 I	Clube Jaó (2)	Aliança
2013 II	Clube Jaó (3)	Goiânia
2014	Aliança (12)	Clube Jaó
2015	Aliança (13)	Campinas
2016	Not held	
2017	Clube Jaó (4)	Aliança
2018	Aliança (14)	Clube Jaó
2019	Goiás (1)	Aliança
2020	Not held	
2021	Vila Nova (1)	Aliança
2022	Aliança (15)	Atletas de Jesus
2023	Aliança (16)	Vila Nova
2024	Vila Nova (2)	Atlético Goianiense
2025	Vila Nova (3)	Planalto

== Titles by team ==
Teams in bold stills active.

Rank	Club	Winners	Winning years
1	Aliança	16	1994, 1995, 1996, 1998, 1999, 2000, 2004, 2006, 2008, 2009, 2010, 2014, 2015, 2018, 2022, 2023
2	Atlético Goianiense	4	1990, 1991, 1992, 1993
2	Clube Jaó	4	2012, 2013 I, 2013 II, 2017
2	Goiânia	4	1997, 2001, 2002, 2003
5	Vila Nova	3	2021, 2024, 2025
6	Ponto Frio	2	1983, 1984
7	Atletas de Jesus	1	2011
7	Goiás	1	2019
