= Umuarama Esporte Clube =

Brazilian football club

Umuarama EC
- Full name: Umuarama Esporte Clube
- Founded: November 15, 1965
- Ground: Ferreirão, Iporá, Goiás state, Brazil
- Head Coach: Kiko Araújo
- League: Campeonato Goiano (Third Division)
| Home colours | Away colours |

Umuarama Esporte Clube is a football club in the city of Iporá, in the state of Goiás that competes in the third division of Campeonato Goiano.

== History ==
Founded on November 15, 1965 in the city of Iporá in the state of Goiás, the club is affiliated to Federação Goiana de Futebol and has played in Campeonato Goiano (Second Division) five times and Third Division seven times.
