= Caldas Novas Atlético Clube =

Football club in Goiás, Brazil

Caldas Novas AC
- Full name: Caldas Novas Atlético Clube
- Founded: April 18, 1982
- Ground: Serra de Caldas, Caldas Novas, Goiás state, Brazil
- Capacity: 5.000
- President: Júlio Fortes
- Head Coach: Renato Schumacher
- League: Licensed
Home colours	Away colours

Caldas Novas Atlético Clube is a Brazilian football club, headquartered in Caldas Novas, the city with the largest hydrothermal resort in the world, located in the state of Goiás. Founded on April 18, 1982. It is currently inactive in Goiás football.

== History ==
Founded on April 18, 1982, Caldas Novas Atlético Clube debuted professionally in 2007, in the Campeonato Goiano (Third Division).

== Titles ==
- Campeonato Goiano (Second Division) (2014)
- Campeonato Goiano (Third Division) (2012)
