= Monte Cristo Esporte Clube =

Football club in the city Goiânia, in Brazil

Monte Cristo
- Full name: Monte Cristo Esporte Clube
- Founded: January 26, 1970
- Ground: Abrão Manoel da Costa, Goiânia, Goiás state, Brazil
- Capacity: 3,000
- President: Getulio Orlando de Souza
- League: Campeonato Goiano (Third Division)
| Home colours | Away colours |

Monte Cristo Esporte Clube, better known as Monte Cristo, is a football club in the city of Goiânia, in the state of Goiás.

== History ==
Founded on January 26, 1970, Monte Cristo currently disputes the third division of Campeonato Goiano 2021.

== Title ==
- Campeonato Goiano (Second Division) (1980)

== Players ==
=== Squad 2021 ===
As of 24 October 2021. Source: FGF

Note: Flags indicate national team as defined under FIFA eligibility rules; some limited exceptions apply. Players may hold more than one non-FIFA nationality.

| No. | Pos. | Nation | Player |
|---|---|---|---|
| 1 | GK | (Brazil) BRA | Gabriel Mateus Alves |
| 2 | RB | (Brazil) BRA | Anderson Sousa Medrado |
| 3 | DF | (Brazil) BRA | Andreilton Damacena |
| 4 | DF | (Brazil) BRA | Everaldino Queiroz |
| 5 | DF | (Brazil) BRA | Bruno Schimidt |
| 6 | LB | (Brazil) BRA | Wender Robson Basilio |
| 7 | FW | (Brazil) BRA | Edinilson Francisco |
| 8 | MF | (Brazil) BRA | Aiven Mota Ferreira |
| 9 | FW | (Brazil) BRA | Carlos Vinicius dos Santos |
| 10 | FW | (Brazil) BRA | Matheus Nunes Fabiano |
| 11 | FW | (Brazil) BRA | Dé Bahia |

| No. | Pos. | Nation | Player |
|---|---|---|---|
| 12 | GK | (Brazil) BRA | Igor Gabriel da Silva |
| 13 | RB | (Brazil) BRA | Iveno Mota Ferreira |
| 14 | FW | (Brazil) BRA | Carlos Gabriel Sousa |
| 15 | DF | (Brazil) BRA | Matheus Conegundes |
| 16 | MF | (Brazil) BRA | Jesse Adrian Cardoso |
| 17 | LB | (Brazil) BRA | Everton Saraiva |
| 18 | FW | (Brazil) BRA | Thiago Henrique da Silva |
