= Goiatuba Esporte Clube =

Goiatuba
- Full name: Goiatuba Esporte Clube
- Nickname: Azulão
- Founded: 5 May 1970 (56 years ago)
- Ground: Divinão
- Capacity: 15,000
- President: Osvaldo Pereira de Souza Neto
- Head coach: Wagner Lopes
- League: Campeonato Brasileiro Série D Campeonato Goiano
- 2025 2025: Série D, 8th of 64; Goiano, 9th of 12
Home colors	Away colors

Goiatuba Esporte Clube, also known as Goiatuba, is a Brazilian football team located in Goiatuba, Goiás. They won the Campeonato Goiano once.

== History ==
On May 5, 1970, a sports group met in a room located downtown and set up a professional football club called Goiatuba Esporte Clube, named after the city. The blue bird was chosen as the club's mascot and nicknamed Azulão (meaning Big Blue).

Before the club became professional, it participated in the inauguration of Estádio Divino Garcia Rosa, known as Divinão. The club was made up only of footballers from the city. The match, against JK of Morrinhos, was played on January 30, 1970 and the score was 2–2.

Sometime later, Goiatuba played its first professional match beating América of Morrinhos 1–0.

In 1970, Goiatuba won its first title, the Third Taça Vale do Paranaíba, playing against the following clubs: Bom Jesus, Triângulo de Monte Alegre de Minas, Centralina de Minas, Grêmio Buriti Alegre, Vasco de Tupaciguara and Itumbiara, finishing with 18 points with the striker Esqueleti scoring 14 goals.

In 1992, the club won the state championship for the first time, beating Goiás, Vila Nova, and Atlético Goianiense in the final four. Between 1994 and 1997, Goiatuba participated in the Campeonato Brasileiro Série B.

== Honours ==
- Campeonato Goiano
  - Winners (1): 1992
- Copa Goiás
  - Winners (1): 1993
- Campeonato Goiano Second Division
  - Winners (4): 1984, 1997, 2021, 2023
- Campeonato Goiano Third Division
  - Winners (1): 2019
- Torneio Incentivo
  - Winners (1): 1979

== Stadium ==
Goiatuba's home stadium is Estádio Divino Garcia Rosa, nicknamed Divinão, with a maximum capacity of 15,000 people.
