= Peabiru =

Coordinates: 23°54′S 52°20′W

- Municipality
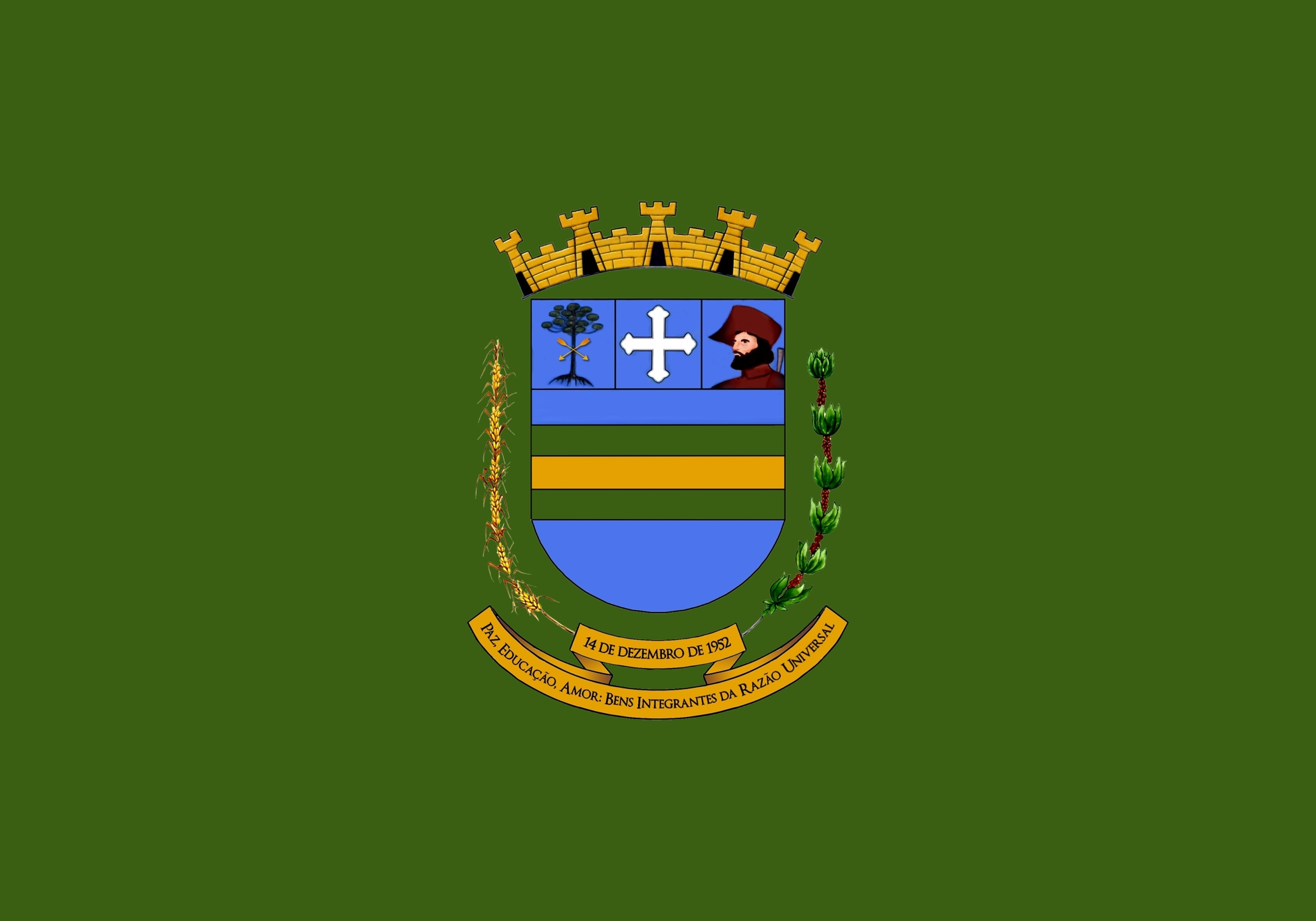
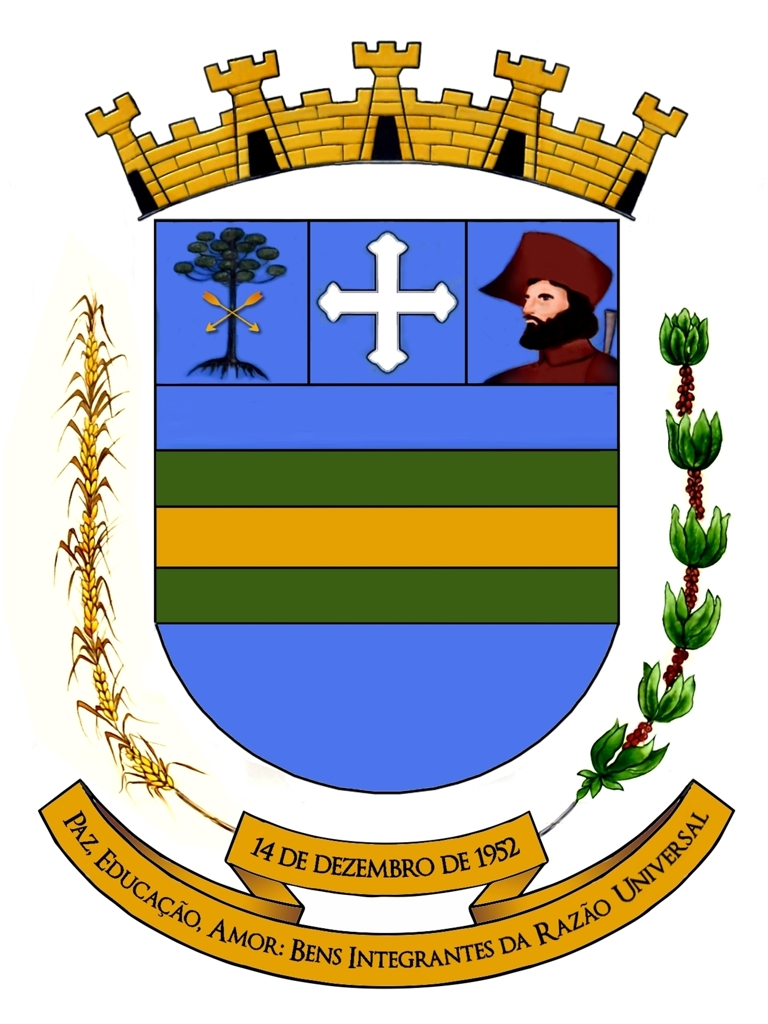
- Flag Coat of arms
- Interactive map of Peabiru
- Country: Brazil
- Region: Southern
- State: Paraná
- Mesoregion: Centro Ocidental Paranaense

Population (2020)
  - Total: 14,007
- Time zone: UTC−3 (BRT)

Peabiru is a municipality in the state of Paraná in the Southern Region of Brazil.

== See also ==
- List of municipalities in Paraná
