= América Futebol Clube (GO) =

América
- Full name: América Futebol Clube
- Nickname(s): Leão do Sul
- Founded: March 5, 1937 (88 years ago)
- Ground: Estádio do Centro Esportivo João Vilela, Morrinhos, Goiás, Brazil
- Capacity: 5,040
Home colours	Away colours

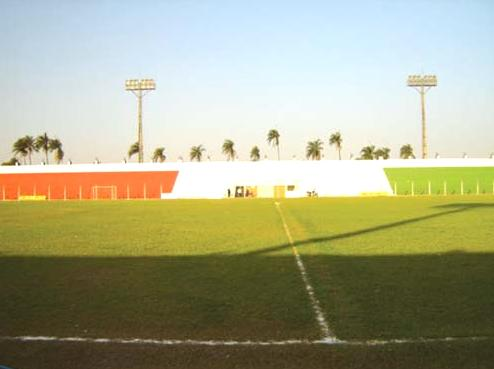
Centro Esp. João Vilela

América Futebol Clube, is a Brazilian association football club based in Morrinhos, Goiás. The club was founded on 5 March 1937.

Between 1959 and 1997 América played 14 times in the first division of the state championship of Goías, and in the second division until 2004.

After this, the club did not take part in any competitions. América returned to join the third state division in 2012. In 2013 the club achieved ascension to the second division.

== Stadium ==
América Futebol Clube play their home games at Estádio do Centro Esportivo João Vilela. The stadium has a maximum capacity of 5,040 people.

== Players ==
=== Squad 2021 ===
As of 24 October 2021. Source: FGF

Note: Flags indicate national team as defined under FIFA eligibility rules; some limited exceptions apply. Players may hold more than one non-FIFA nationality.

No.	Pos.	Nation	Player
1	GK	(Brazil) BRA	Pablo Miguel Freitas
2	RB	(Brazil) BRA	Murylo Benini Ramiro
3	DF	(Brazil) BRA	Johnathan Divino Dia
4	DF	(Brazil) BRA	Tiago Panta da Silva
5	DF	(Brazil) BRA	Yohan Cesar Vieira
6	LB	(Brazil) BRA	Rodrigo Rosa da Silva
7	MF	(Brazil) BRA	Alessandro Moreno
8	MF	(Brazil) BRA	Franklim Apolinario
9	FW	(Brazil) BRA	Igor Oliveira de Lima
10	FW	(Brazil) BRA	Bruno de Morais
11	FW	(Brazil) BRA	Luiz Carlos Santos

No.	Pos.	Nation	Player
12	GK	(Brazil) BRA	Marcelo de Oliveira
13	RB	(Brazil) BRA	Kenalty Alves Cardoso
14	FW	(Brazil) BRA	Lucas Amorim da Silva
15	DF	(Brazil) BRA	Johnatan Marinho
16	MF	(Brazil) BRA	Denilson Gomes da Silva
17	LB	(Brazil) BRA	Marcio Aurelio Pereira
18	FW	(Brazil) BRA	Rafael Coura Gonçalves

== Honours ==
- Campeonato Goiano Second Division
  - Winners (1): 1987
- Campeonato Goiano do Interior
  - Winners (1): 1957
