= Goiânia Esporte Clube =

Goiânia
- Full name: Goiânia Esporte Clube
- Nickname: Galo Carijó
- Founded: 5 July 1938; 87 years ago
- Ground: Estádio Olímpico Pedro Ludovico, Goiânia, Brazil
- Capacity: 13,500
- Chairman: Arione de Paula
- Manager: Glauber Ramos
- League: Campeonato Goiano Segunda Divisão
- 2025 2025: Série D, 57th of 64; Goiano, 12th of 12 (relegated)
Home colours	Away colours	Third colours

Goiânia Esporte Clube, or Goiânia as they are usually called, are a Brazilian football team from Goiânia in Goiás state, founded on 5 July 1938. Their home stadium is the Olímpico Pedro Ludovico, which has a maximum capacity of 10,000 people. They play in black and white shirts, white shorts and black socks. Goiânia competed several times in the Série A. The club has the fourth largest fan base in the state.

== History ==
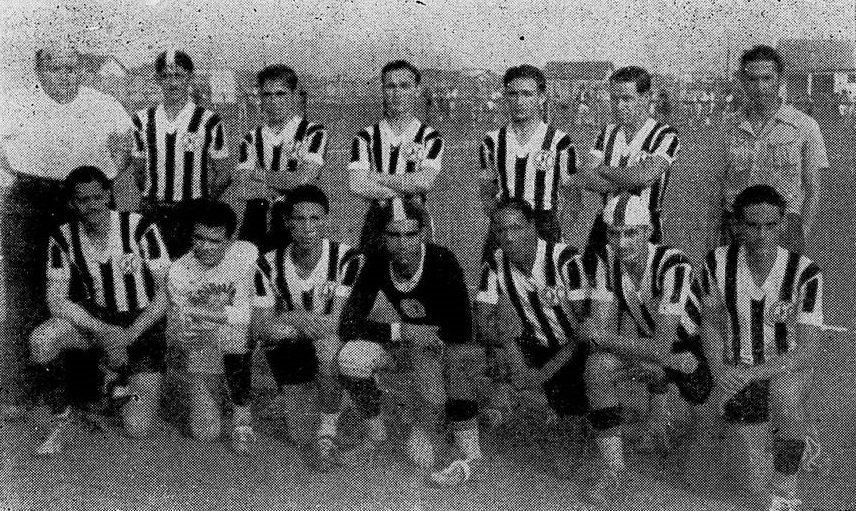
The Goiânia team of 1941.

Goiânia Esporte Clube were founded on July 5, 1938, and it is the oldest club of the state of Goiás. The club won the Campeonato Goiano in 1945, 1946, 1948, 1950, 1951, 1952, 1953, 1954, 1956, 1958, 1959, 1960, 1968 and 1974. However, after the Estádio Serra Dourada was inaugurated, Goiânia never won the state championship again. They won the Copa Brasil Central in 1967, and the Campeonato Goiano Second Level in 1998 and in 2006.

The first time the club competed in the Série A was in 1975, when they finished were eliminated in the first stage. In 1976, they were again eliminated in the first stage, being eliminated in the first stage again in 1977, and in 1979. Goiânia also competed in the Copa João Havelange, in 2000, when they were eliminated in the White Module's first stage.

Goiânia competed twice in the Copa do Brasil. The first time was in 1991, when they were eliminated in the first round by Fluminense de Feira. The second time was in 2001, when they beat América Mineiro in the first round but were eliminated by Corinthians in the second round.

- Campeonato Goiano Second Division
  - Winners (2): 1998, 2006

== Honours ==
=== Official tournaments ===
State
Competitions	Titles	Seasons
Campeonato Goiano	14	1945, 1946, 1948, 1950, 1951, 1952, 1953, 1954, 1956, 1958, 1959, 1960, 1968, 1974
Campeonato Goiano Second Division	2	1998, 2006

=== Others tournaments ===
==== Regional ====
- Copa Brasil Central (1): 1967

==== State ====
- Torneio Incentivo (1): 1983
- Torneio Início do Campeonato Goiano (11): 1940, 1943, 1946, 1947, 1950, 1952, 1953, 1954, 1963, 1967, 1991

==== City ====
- Campeonato Citadino de Goiânia (4): 1938, 1939, 1940, 1943
- Torneio Início Citadino de Goiânia (2): 1940, 1943
- Taça Cidade de Goiânia (4): 1960, 1965, 1973, 1974
- Torneio Goiânia (1): 1944

=== Runners-up ===
- Campeonato Goiano (11): 1944, 1947, 1949, 1955, 1957, 1970, 1975, 1976, 1984, 1985, 1990
- Copa Goiás (1): 1971
- Copa Leonino Caiado (1): 1972
- Campeonato Goiano Second Division (1): 2022

=== Women's Football ===
- Campeonato Goiano de Futebol Feminino (4): 1997, 2001, 2002, 2003

== Stadium ==
Goiânia play their home games at Olímpico Pedro Ludovico, located in Goiânia. The stadium has a maximum capacity of 13,500 people, and was inaugurated on September 3, 1941.

== Rivals ==
The rivalry between Goiânia and Atlético Goianiense is the oldest of the state. The derby against Goiás is known as Clássico Go-Go. Vila Nova is another rival.
