= Pires do Rio Futebol Clube =

Brazilian football club

Pires do Rio
- Full name: Pires do Rio Futebol Clube
- Founded: September 7, 1935
- Ground: Estádio Edson Monteiro de Godoy, Pires do Rio, Goiás state, Brazil
- Capacity: 5,000
- President: Luciano Mendes do Vale
- League: Campeonato Goiano (Third Division) (2017)
| Home colours | Away colours |

Pires do Rio Futebol Clube, better known simply as Pires do Rio, is a Brazilian football club in the city of Pires do Rio, in the state of Goiás.

== History ==
Founded on September 7, 1935 in the city of Pires do Rio in the state of Goiás, the club is affiliated to Federação Goiana de Futebol and Currently, the club disputes Campeonato Goiano (Third Division). In 1992, FGF held an intermediate competition called Campeonato Goiano (Intermediate Division). Caldas ended up being champion and won the right to dispute the first division of Goiano.

== Titles ==
- Campeonato Goiano (Second Division) (1996)
