= Caldas Esporte Clube =

Brazilian football club

Caldas
- Full name: Caldas Esporte Clube
- Founded: April 18, 1982
- Ground: Estádio Serra de Caldas, Caldas Novas, Goiás state, Brazil
- Capacity: 5,000
- President: Gleidson Rocha Teles
- League: Campeonato Goiano (Third Division) (2017)
Home colours	Away colours

Caldas Esporte Clube, better known simply as Caldas, is a Brazilian football club in the city of Caldas Novas, in the state of Goiás.

== History ==
Founded on April 18, 1982 in the city of Paraúna in the state of Goiás, the club is affiliated to Federação Goiana de Futebol and Currently, the club disputes Campeonato Goiano (Third Division). In 1992, FGF held an intermediate competition called Campeonato Goiano (Intermediate Division). Caldas ended up being champion and won the right to dispute the first division of Goiano.

== Titles ==
- Campeonato Goiano (Intermediate Division) (1992)
