= Esporte Clube Quirinópolis =

Football club in the Quirinópolis, state of Goiás, Brazil

Quirinópolis
- Full name: Esporte Clube Quirinópolis
- Founded: March 18, 1986
- Ground: Estádio Bichinho Vieira, Quirinópolis, Goiás state, Brazil
- Capacity: 7,000
- President: Romisdete Neves
- Head Coach: Paulo Mendes
- League: Campeonato Goiano (Third Division) (2017)
Home colours	Away colours

Esporte Clube Quirinópolis is a football club in the city of Quirinópolis, in the state of Goiás, Brazil. The club has previously competed in the third division of Campeonato Goiano.

== History ==
Founded on March 18, 1986, in the city of Quirinópolis in the state of Goiás, the club is affiliated to Federação Goiana de Futebol. Its last professional championship participation was in 2014, when it competed in the Campeonato Goiano (Third Division).

== Titles ==
- Campeonato Goiano (Second Division) (1988)
