= Fluminense Futebol Clube (Araguari) =

Fluminense
- Full name: Fluminense Futebol Clube
- Nickname(s): Tricolor do Bosque
- Founded: January 10, 1942
- Ground: Estádio Sebastião César, Araguari, Minas Gerais state, Brazil
- Capacity: 8,000
Home colors	Away colors

Fluminense Futebol Clube, commonly known as Fluminense, is a Brazilian football club based in Araguari, Minas Gerais state.

== History ==
The club was founded on January 10, 1942, adopting the same name, kits and colors as Fluminense Football Club of Rio de Janeiro city.

== Stadium ==
Fluminense Futebol Clube play their home games at Estádio Sebastião César. The stadium has a maximum capacity of 8,000 people.
