= Morrinhos Futebol Clube =

Morrinhos
- Full name: Morrinhos Futebol Clube
- Nickname(s): Tricolor dos Pomares
- Founded: 20 April 1982; 42 years ago
- Ground: Estádio do Centro Esportivo João Vilela, Morrinhos, Goiás state, Brazil
- Capacity: 5,040
Home colours	Away colours

Morrinhos Futebol Clube, commonly known as Morrinhos, is a Brazilian football club based in Morrinhos, Goiás state.

== History ==
The club was founded on April 20, 1982. They won the Campeonato Goiano Second Level in 2009.

== Achievements ==
- Campeonato Goiano Second Level:
  - Winners (1): 2009

== Stadium ==
Morrinhos Futebol Clube play their home games at Estádio do Centro Esportivo João Vilela. The stadium has a maximum capacity of 5,040 people.
