= Onitlasi Moraes =

Brazilian footballer

Moraes
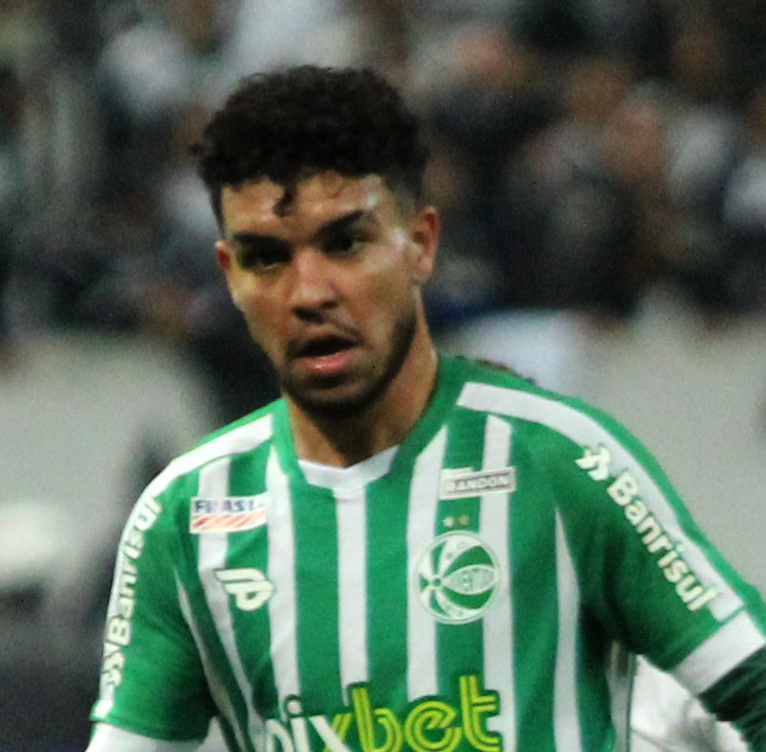
- Moraes with Juventude in 2022

Personal information
- Full name: Onitlasi Júnior de Moraes Rodrigues
- Date of birth: 3 October 1997 (age 29)
- Place of birth: Goianira, Brazil
- Height: 1.70 m (5 ft 7 in)
- Position: Left back

Team information
- Current team: Operário Ferroviário (on loan from Goiás)
- Number: 6

Youth career
- 2009–2013: Goiás
- 2014–2016: Atlético Goianiense
- 2016–2017: Flamengo

Senior career*
Years	Team	Apps	(Gls)
2015–2016	Atlético Goianiense	6	(0)
2015	→ Bom Jesus (loan)	9	(2)
2016–2018	Flamengo	0	(0)
2018	→ São Bento (loan)	4	(1)
2018	→ Atlético Goianiense (loan)	2	(1)
2019–2023	Atlético Goianiense	35	(7)
2020–2021	→ Mirassol (loan)	27	(2)
2021	→ Santos (loan)	13	(0)
2022	→ Juventude (loan)	26	(1)
2023	→ Aparecidense (loan)	1	(1)
2025	Aparecidense	6	(2)
2025–	Goiás	21	(2)
2026–	→ Operário Ferroviário (loan)	43	(4)
- * Club domestic league appearances and goals as of 18 November 2026

Onitlasi Júnior de Moraes Rodrigues (born 3 October 1997), commonly known as Moraes, is a Brazilian footballer who plays as left back for Operário Ferroviário, on loan from Goiás.

== Club career ==
=== Early career ===
Born in Goianira, Goiás, Moraes began his career at Goiás' youth setup in 2009. He moved to Atlético Goianiense in 2014, but was loaned to local side Bom Jesus in 2015.

Known as Juninho at that time, he made his senior debut on 5 September 2015, starting in a 1–1 Campeonato Goiano Terceira Divisão home draw against Aparecida. He scored his first goal on 27 September, netting his team's second in a 3–2 away success over Monte Cristo.

Back at Atlético for the 2016 campaign, Moraes extended his contract until 2020 in February. He made his first team debut for the club on 3 February of that year, coming on as a second-half substitute for Jorginho in a 3–0 away win against Trinadade for the Goiano championship.

=== Flamengo ===
In May 2016, Moraes moved to Flamengo and was initially assigned to the under-20 squad. He impressed for the under-20s in the 2017 Copa São Paulo de Futebol Júnior, and trained regularly with the first team during the campaign, but was only an unused substitute for a few matches.

==== São Bento (loan) ====
On 5 January 2018, Moraes was loaned to São Bento until the end of the season. He featured rarely for the club, appearing in four matches before suffering a knee injury in May.

=== Atlético Goianiense ===
Moraes returned to Atlético Goianiense in August 2018, on loan until the end of the year. He signed a permanent contract with the club ahead of the 2019 campaign, as his contract with Mengão expired.

A regular starter in the 2019 Goiano, Moraes lost his first-choice status to new signing Nicolas Vichiatto in the 2019 Série B and featured in only four matches.

==== Loans to Mirassol, Santos and Juventude ====
On 17 July 2020, Moraes was loaned to Série D side Mirassol until June 2021. He immediately became a starter at his new club, helping in their promotion to the Série C as champions.

On 27 May 2021, Moraes was loaned to Santos until the following April, with a €1 million buyout clause. He featured sparingly for the club, mainly acting as a backup to Felipe Jonatan, and left the side on 14 January 2022 to join Juventude.

==== 2023 season ====
After sharing the starting spot with William Matheus as Ju suffered relegation, Moraes returned to Atlético for the 2023 season. A regular starter during the 2023 Campeonato Goiano, he reached an agreement with the Public Ministry of Goiás on 9 May 2023, after being included in the 2023 Brazilian football match-fixing scandal; hours later, he was loaned out to Aparecidense.

== Personal life ==
Moraes' is named after his grandfather, Isaltino, with Onitlasi being his name backwards. On 1 June 2023, after being involved in match-fixing schemes, he was suspended from football for 760 days and charged a R$ 55,000 fine.

== Career statistics ==
As of 22 May 2023

Club	Season	League			State League		Cup		Continental		Other		Total	
Club	Season	Division	Apps	Goals	Apps	Goals	Apps	Goals	Apps	Goals	Apps	Goals	Apps	Goals
Bom Jesus	2015	Goiano 3ª Divisão	—		9	2	—		—		—		9	2
Atlético Goianiense	2016	Série B	0	0	6	0	1	0	—		—		7	0
Flamengo	2016	Série A	0	0	0	0	0	0	—		—		0	0
Flamengo	2017	Série A	0	0	0	0	0	0	—		—		0	0
Flamengo	2018	Série A	0	0	0	0	0	0	—		—		0	0
Flamengo	Total		0	0	0	0	0	0	—		—		0	0
São Bento	2018	Série B	2	0	2	1	0	0	—		—		4	1
Atlético Goianiense	2018	Série B	2	1	—		—		—		—		2	1
Atlético Goianiense	2019	Série B	4	1	9	1	3	0	—		—		16	2
Atlético Goianiense	2020	Série A	0	0	4	0	0	0	—		—		4	0
Atlético Goianiense	2023	Série B	1	0	15	4	2	0	—		—		18	4
Atlético Goianiense	Total		7	2	28	5	5	0	—		—		40	7
Mirassol (loan)	2020	Série D	13	1	4	0	—		—		—		17	1
Mirassol (loan)	2021	Série C	0	0	10	1	1	1	—		—		11	2
Mirassol (loan)	Total		13	1	14	1	1	1	—		—		28	3
Santos (loan)	2021	Série A	13	0	—		—		2 (Note: Appearance(s) in Copa Sudamericana)	0	—		15	0
Juventude (loan)	2022	Série A	19	1	7	0	0	0	—		—		26	1
Aparecidense (loan)	2023	Série C	1	1	—		—		—		—		1	1
Career total			55	5	66	9	7	1	2	0	0	0	130	15

== Honours ==
Flamengo

- Campeonato Carioca: 2017

Atlético Goianiense

- Campeonato Goiano: 2019

Mirassol

- Campeonato Brasileiro Série D: 2020
