= Flávio Barros (footballer, born 1966) =

Brazilian footballer

Personal information
- Full name: Flávio Pereira de Barros Júnior
- Date of birth: 3 January 1966 (age 60)
- Place of birth: Recife, Brazil
- Position: Centre back

Youth career
- Náutico

Senior career*
Years	Team	Apps	(Gls)
1984–1988	Náutico		
1989	Figueirense		
1990	Cascavel		
1991–1992	Anapolina		
1992	Ceres-GO		
1993	Taquariense		
1994	Santa Helena		
1995	Moto Club		
1996–1997	Barra do Garças		

Managerial career
- 1998–2000: Ceres-GO
- 2001: CRB (assistant)
- 2002: Santa Helena
- 2002: Minaçu
- 2003: Goiânia
- 2003: Minaçu
- 2004–2005: Bom Jesus
- 2005: ASA
- 2005: CRB
- 2006: ASA
- 2006: CSE
- 2006: Aparecidense
- 2007: Ipanema
- 2007: Coruripe
- 2007: ASA
- 2007–2008: Central
- 2008: Treze
- 2008: CSA
- 2008: Gama
- 2009: CSA
- 2009: Cristal
- 2009: ABC
- 2010: Luziânia
- 2010: São Raimundo-PA
- 2010: Nerópolis
- 2010: Cristal
- 2011: Araripina
- 2011–2012: Murici
- 2012: Atlético Alagoinhas
- 2012: Santos-AP
- 2013: Sousa
- 2014: Potiguar Mossoró
- 2014: Alecrim
- 2014: River
- 2015: Mixto
- 2016: Central
- 2019: Tapajós
- 2022: Treze
- * Club domestic league appearances and goals

Flávio Pereira de Barros Júnior (born 3 January 1966), known as Flávio Barros, is a Brazilian professional football manager and former player who played as a central defender.

== Honours ==
=== Manager ===
ASA

- Campeonato Alagoano: 2005

Coruripe

- Campeonato Alagoano: 2007

CSA

- Campeonato Alagoano: 2008
