= Juninho (footballer, born November 1987) =

Brazilian footballer

Personal information
- Full name: Adilson dos Anjos Oliveira
- Date of birth: 23 October 1987 (age 39)
- Place of birth: Goiânia, Brazil
- Height: 1.71 m (5 ft 7 1/2 in)
- Position: Defensive midfielder

Team information
- Current team: Goiás
- Number: 8

Senior career*
Years	Team	Apps	(Gls)
2009–2010	Aparecida	12	(1)
2011–2012	Rio Verde	26	(2)
2011	→ Aparecida (loan)	9	(1)
2012–2013	Mogi Mirim	16	(0)
2013–2016	Atlético Paranaense	31	(0)
2014–2015	→ Ponte Preta (loan)	63	(2)
2016	→ Ferroviária (loan)	15	(2)
2016	→ América Mineiro (loan)	32	(2)
2017–2024	América Mineiro	265	(22)
2025–	Goiás	83	(3)
- * Club domestic league appearances and goals as of 17 November 2026

Adilson dos Anjos Oliveira (born 23 October 1987), commonly known as Juninho, is a Brazilian footballer who captains and plays as a defensive midfielder for Goiás.

== Career ==
=== Early career ===
Born in Goiânia, Goiás, Juninho worked as a butcher in a supermarket before starting his career with Aparecida in 2009, already aged 22. He moved to Rio Verde in 2011, winning the year's Campeonato Goiano Segunda Divisão, and was regularly used during the 2012 Campeonato Goiano.

=== Mogi Mirim ===
On 3 May 2012, Juninho was announced at Série D side Mogi Mirim. He played a part in the club's promotion campaign to the Série C, and featured regularly in the 2013 Campeonato Paulista.

=== Atlético Paranaense ===
On 28 May 2013, Juninho signed for Série A side Atlético Paranaense. He made his debut in the category on 1 June, coming on as a first-half substitute for Deivid in a 2–2 home draw against Flamengo.

During the 2013 season, Juninho was mainly used as a left back with head coach Vagner Mancini, as a backup to Pedro Botelho. He was, however, demoted to the under-23 squad for the 2014 Campeonato Paranaense by new head coach Miguel Ángel Portugal.

==== Loan to Ponte Preta ====
Juninho was loaned to Série B side Ponte Preta on 24 April 2014, until the end of the year. He became an immediate first-choice at the club, scoring twice in 35 league appearanceas as the club returned to the top tier at first attempt.

Juninho remained at Ponte for the 2015 season, after the club agreed a new one-year loan with Atlético on 13 January of that year.

==== Loan to Ferroviária ====
In January 2016, Juninho was one of several players of Atlético loaned to Ferroviária for the 2016 Campeonato Paulista, after both clubs agreed to a partnership. He featured in all matches of the club in the competition, as they managed to avoid relegation.

=== América Mineiro ===
On 10 May 2016, Juninho joined América Mineiro in the top tier, on loan until the end of the year. He was a first-choice as the club suffered relegation, scoring twice in 32 league matches; his first goal in the category came on 25 July, but in a 2–1 away loss against Flamengo.

Juninho signed permanently with Coelho on 7 February 2017, after agreeing to a two-year deal. He achieved promotion as champions in the end of the season, but again suffered team relegation in the following year; on 10 December 2018, he renewed his contract until 2020.

Juninho featured in all matches of the 2019 Série B, as his side narrowly missed out promotion. He remained a starter in 2020, as the club returned to the second division, and signed a new two-year deal on 11 December 2021, after helping América to qualify to the Copa Libertadores for the first time in the club's history.

On 7 December 2022, Juninho renewed his contract until the end of 2024.

== Career statistics ==
As of 1 March 2023

Club	Season	League			State League		Cup		Continental		Other		Total	
Club	Season	Division	Apps	Goals	Apps	Goals	Apps	Goals	Apps	Goals	Apps	Goals	Apps	Goals
Aparecida	2009	Goiano 3ª Divisão	—		11	1	—		—		—		11	1
Aparecida	2010	Goiano 3ª Divisão	—		1	0	—		—		—		1	0
Aparecida	Total		—		12	1	—		—		—		12	1
Rio Verde	2011	Goiano 2ª Divisão	—		9	0	—		—		—		9	0
Rio Verde	2012	Goiano	—		17	2	—		—		—		17	2
Rio Verde	Total		—		26	2	—		—		—		26	2
Aparecida (loan)	2011	Goiano 3ª Divisão	—		9	1	—		—		—		9	1
Mogi Mirim	2012	Série D	8	0	—		—		—		—		8	0
Mogi Mirim	2013	Paulista	—		8	0	—		—		—		8	0
Mogi Mirim	Total		8	0	8	0	—		—		—		16	0
Atlético Paranaense	2013	Série A	19	0	—		7	0	—		—		26	0
Atlético Paranaense	2014	Série A	0	0	12	0	0	0	—		—		12	0
Atlético Paranaense	Total		19	0	12	0	7	0	—		—		38	0
Ponte Preta (loan)	2014	Série B	35	2	—		3	0	—		—		38	2
Ponte Preta (loan)	2015	Série A	22	0	6	0	5	0	2 (Note: Appearance(s) in Copa Sudamericana)	0	—		35	0
Ponte Preta (loan)	Total		57	2	6	0	8	0	2	0	—		73	2
Ferroviária (loan)	2016	Paulista	—		15	2	—		—		—		15	2
América Mineiro	2016	Série A	32	2	—		—		—		—		32	2
América Mineiro	2017	Série B	24	0	10	0	2	0	—		2 (Note: Appearance(s) in Primeira Liga)	0	38	0
América Mineiro	2018	Série A	34	4	6	0	1	0	—		—		41	4
América Mineiro	2019	Série B	38	5	12	1	2	0	—		—		52	6
América Mineiro	2020	Série B	33	3	12	0	12	0	—		—		57	3
América Mineiro	2021	Série A	37	3	12	0	4	0	—		—		53	3
América Mineiro	2022	Série A	35	5	5	0	5	0	8 (Note: Appearance(s) in Copa Libertadores)	0	—		53	5
América Mineiro	2023	Série A	0	0	7	1	1	0	0	0	—		8	1
América Mineiro	Total		233	22	64	2	27	0	8	0	2	0	334	24
Career total			317	24	152	8	42	0	8	0	2	0	521	32

== Honours ==
Rio Verde

- Campeonato Goiano Segunda Divisão: 2011

América Mineiro

- Campeonato Brasileiro Série B: 2017
