= 2023 Brazilian football match-fixing scandal =

Match-fixing scandal

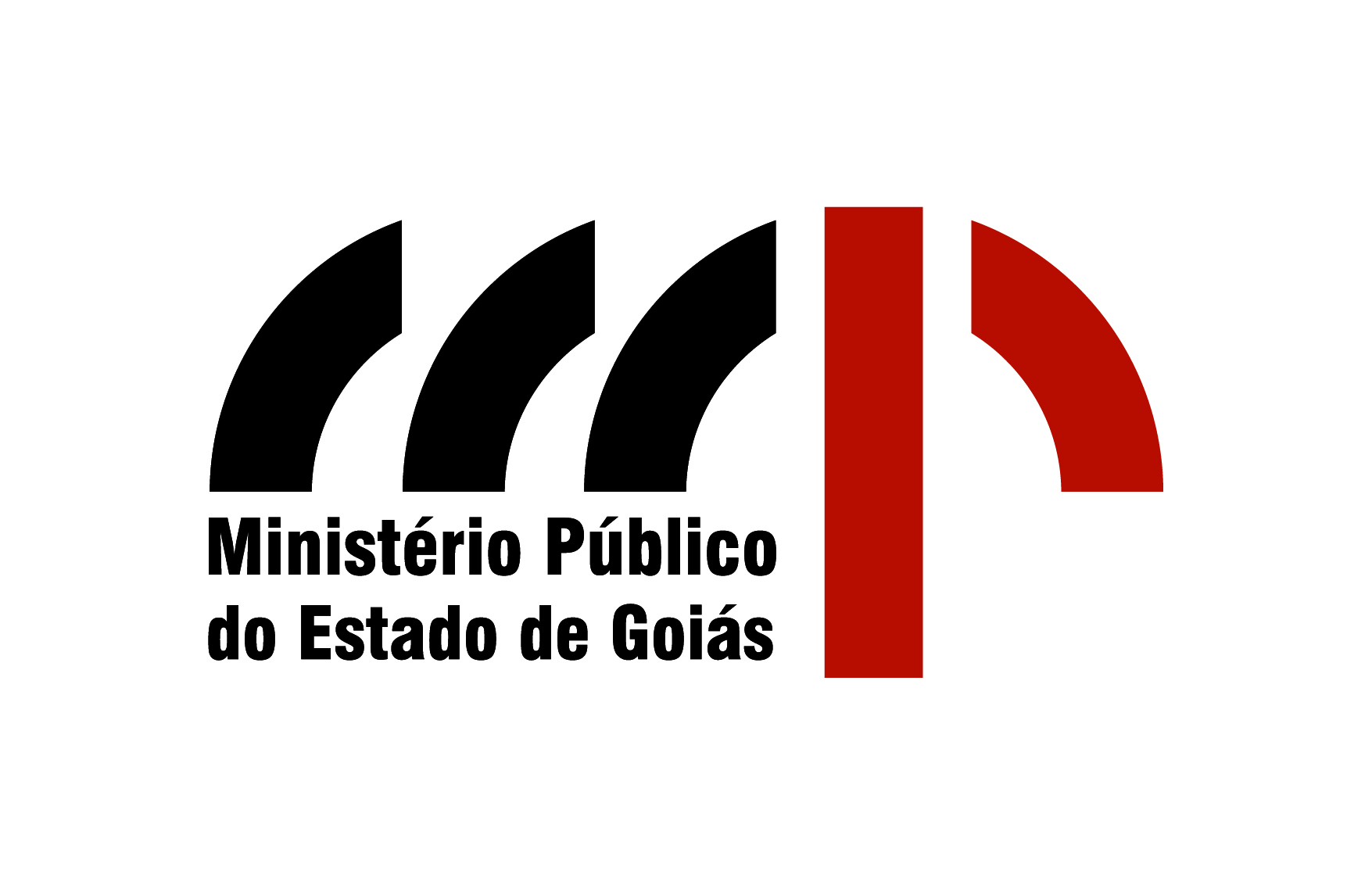
Public Ministry of the State of Goiás: official logo

Operação Penalidade Máxima (literally Operation Maximum Penalty), is an ongoing Brazilian football match-fixing scandal investigation being performed by the Public Ministry of Goiás.

== Overview ==
On 14 February 2023, a criminal organization that operated to manipulate the results of football matches in Campeonato Brasileiro Série B of the Brazilian Championship was the target of an operation by the Public Ministry of the State of Goiás (MPGO).

The investigation began with three matches from the Série B. All took place in the last round: Vila Nova 0–0 Sport Recife, Criciúma 2–0 Tombense and Sampaio Corrêa 2–1 Londrina. The scheme would have an estimated profit of R$ 2 million, if a penalty kick were committed in all three of them. Two of them had penalties, but no penalties occurred in the Vila Nova match, because the player who initially received R$10,000 to commit the penalty did not play the match.

On 18 April 2023, a second phase of the operation was launched, named Operação Penalidade Máxima II. It was also carried out by the Public Ministry of Goiás (MPGO), through the Special Action Group to Combat Organized Crime (Gaeco) and the Coordination of Institutional Security and Intelligence (CSI). The action aims to obtain new evidence on the manipulation of results of professional football matches – including the 2022 Campeonato Brasileiro Série A. According to the MPGO, there are suspicions that the criminal group has actually acted in at least five games, as well as in five state championship matches, including the state championships in Goiás, Rio Grande do Sul, Mato Grosso and São Paulo, all in the year 2023.

== Suspects involved ==
At the start of the second phase, 16 people were involved in the investigations. This number increased after new outcomes, on 10 May.

Initially, four players admitted their involvement with the match-fixing scandal, and were not indicted: Kevin Lomónaco (Red Bull Bragantino), Moraes (at the time at Juventude), Nikolas Farias (Novo Hamburgo) and Jarro Pedroso (Inter de Santa Maria). On 9 May 2023, Moraes (at the time at Juventude) reached an agreement with the Public Ministry after admitting his involvement, and became a witness in the investigations. Thirteen days later, Bryan García (Athletico Paranaense) followed suit.

On 26 May 2023, two more players became witnesses after reaching an agreement with the Public Ministry: Diego Porfírio (at the time at Coritiba) and Nino Paraíba (at the time at Ceará).

=== Players ===
The following players had the complaint of manipulation accepted by the Public Ministry:

- Eduardo Bauermann (centre-back, at the time at Santos)
- Gabriel Tota (midfielder, at the time at Juventude)
- Victor Ramos (centre-back, at the time at Portuguesa)
- Igor Cariús (left-back, at the time at Cuiabá)
- Paulo Miranda (centre-back, at the time at Juventude)
- Fernando Neto (midfielder, at the time at Operário Ferroviário)
- Matheus Gomes (goalkeeper, at the time at Sergipe)
- Vitor Mendes (centre-back, at the time at Juventude)
- Nino Paraíba (right-back, at the time at Ceará)
- Romário (midfielder, at the time at Vila Nova)
- Joseph (centre-back, at the time at Tombense)
- Mateusinho (right-back, at the time at Sampaio Corrêa)
- Gabriel Domingos (forward, at the time at Vila Nova)
- Allan Godói (centre-back, at the time at Sampaio Corrêa)
- André Queixo (midfielder, at the time at Sampaio Corrêa)
- Ygor Catatau (forward, at the time at Sampaio Corrêa)
- Paulo Sérgio (centre-back, at the time at Sampaio Corrêa)

=== Gamblers and members of the criminal organization ===
- Bruno Lopez de Moura
- Ícaro Fernando Calixto dos Santos
- Luís Felipe Rodrigues de Castro
- Victor Yamasaki Fernandes
- Zildo Peixoto Neto
- Thiago Chambó Andrade
- Romário Hugo dos Santos
- William de Oliveira Souza
- Pedro Gama dos Santos Júnior

== Outcomes ==
- Vila Nova rescinded Romário's contract on 30 November 2022, alleging "indiscipline acts" from the player;
- Vila Nova rescinded Gabriel Domingos's contract on 17 March 2023;
- Ituano separated André Queixo from their first team squad on 17 March 2023;
- Sampaio Corrêa separated Alan Godói from their first team squad and suspended his contract on 18 March 2023;
- Tombense rescinded Joseph's contract on 28 March 2023;
- Red Bull Bragantino separated Kevin Lomónaco from their first team squad on 19 April 2023;
- Paulo Miranda requested to have his contract with Náutico rescinded, which occurred on 24 May 2023;
- Santos separated Eduardo Bauermann from their first team squad on 9 May 2023, and suspended his contract seven days later;
- Atlético Goianiense loaned Moraes out to Aparecidense on 9 May 2023, after the played reached an agreement with the Public Ministry;
- Fluminense suspended Vitor Mendes' contract on 10 May 2023;
- Colorado Rapids suspended Max Alves' contract on 10 May 2023;
- São Bernardo suspended Fernando Neto's contract on 10 May 2023;
- Athletico Paranaense fired Bryan García and Pedrinho on 12 May 2023, after their names appeared in a spreadsheet owned by the members of the criminal organization;
- Coritiba suspended Alef Manga's contract on 13 May 2023;
- América Mineiro accepted Nino Paraíba's request for a contract rescision on 15 May 2023;
- Juventude rescinded Gabriel Tota's contract on 17 May 2023, three days after Ypiranga-RS terminated his loan;

== Sentences ==
On 29 May 2023, the Superior Tribunal de Justiça Desportiva (STJD) banned Romário permanently from football, aside from receiving a R$ 25,000 fine, while his former teammate Gabriel Domingos was banned for 720 days and received a R$ 15,000 fine; both became the first players to be judged in the investigation. On 1 June, the STJD punished the players involved in the second stage of the investigations, in first instance:

- Moraes was banned from football for 760 days, plus a R$ 55,000 fine;
- Gabriel Tota was banned from football permanently, plus a R$ 30,000 fine;
- Paulo Miranda was banned from football for 1,000 days, plus a R$ 70,000 fine;
- Eduardo Bauermann received a 12-match ban, without any fines;
- Igor Cariús was absolved;
- Fernando Neto was banned from football for 380 days, plus a R$ 15,000 fine;
- Matheus Gomes was banned from football permanently, plus a R$ 10,000 fine;
- Kevin Lomónaco was banned from football for 380 days, plus a R$ 25,000 fine.

The decisions later changed on 7 July 2023, with Bauermann being banned from football for 360 days plus a R$ 35,000 fine, Fernando Neto and Lomónaco having their ban reduced on 20 days, Moraes having his ban reduced for 40 days, and Paulo Miranda having his ban reduced for 280 days.

== See also ==
- Golden Whistle: Portuguese football corruption scandal
- 2005 Brazilian football match-fixing scandal
- 2006 Serie A scandal in Italy, the Calciopoli
