= Saulo (footballer, born 1982) =

Brazilian footballer

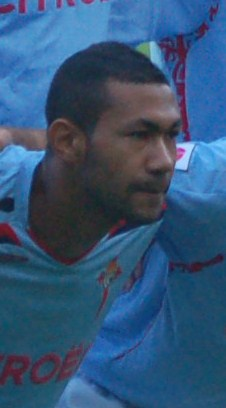
- Saulo with Celta Vigo in 2009

Personal information
- Full name: Saulo Rodrigues dos Santos
- Date of birth: February 18, 1982 (age 44)
- Place of birth: Rio Verde, Goiás, Brazil
- Height: 1.76 m (5 ft 9 in)
- Position: Forward

Team information
- Current team: Santa Helena

Youth career
- Grêmio Anápolis
- 2003: Rioverdense

Senior career*
Years	Team	Apps	(Gls)
2003–2004	Maia	25	(5)
2004–2005	Rio Ave	28	(2)
2005–2008	Naval 1º de Maio	77	(6)
2009	Belenenses	14	(6)
2009–2010	Celta Vigo	18	(1)
2010–2012	Rio Ave	28	(3)
2012	Académica	12	(0)
2012–2013	AEP Paphos	11	(1)
2014	América-PE	8	(1)
2015–2018	Rio Verde GO		
2018	Iporá	10	(4)
2018	Rioverdense		
2019	CRAC		
2019	Rio Verde GO		
2019-	Santa Helena		
- * Club domestic league appearances and goals as of 14 April 2019

Saulo Rodrigues dos Santos (born February 18, 1982), known as Saulo, is a Brazilian footballer who plays as a forward for Santa Helena.
