= Darlan (footballer, born 2003) =

Brazilian footballer

Personal information
- Full name: Darlan Silva Dutra
- Date of birth: 3 July 2003 (age 23)
- Place of birth: São Luís, Brazil
- Height: 1.90 m (6 ft 3 in)
- Position: Centre back

Team information
- Current team: Vitória (on loan from Grêmio Anápolis)
- Number: 3

Youth career
- 2022: Vianópolis
- 2022: Criciúma
- 2023: Vianópolis
- 2023: Grêmio Anápolis

Senior career*
Years	Team	Apps	(Gls)
2021	Tupan	1	(0)
2024–	Grêmio Anápolis	11	(2)
2024–2025	→ Leixões B (loan)	7	(0)
2025	→ Bom Jesus (loan)	11	(1)
2026	→ Gama (loan)	25	(1)
2026–	→ Vitória (loan)	0	(0)
- * Club domestic league appearances and goals as of 02:54, 23 September 2026 (UTC)

Darlan Silva Dutra (born 3 July 2003), simply known sas Darlan, is a Brazilian footballer who plays as a centre-back for Vitória, on loan from Grêmio Anápolis.

== Career ==
Born in São Luís, Maranhão, Darlan began his career with local side Tupan in 2021, before representing the youth sides of Clube Atlético Vianópolis, Criciúma and Grêmio Anápolis. He was promoted to the latter's first team for the 2024 season, and was regularly used before renewing his contract until 2027 and being loaned out to Portuguese side Leixões in August.

Back to Grêmio Anápolis in July 2025 after only featuring for Leixões' under-23 and B-teams, Darlan moved to Bom Jesus on loan on 28 August. On 11 December, he joined Gama also in a temporary deal.

On 10 September 2026, Darlan further extended his link with Grêmio Anápolis until 2028, and was immediately loaned to Série A side Vitória until the end of the year.

== Career statistics ==
As of 22 September 2026

Club	Season	League			State League		Cup		Continental		Other		Total	
Club	Season	Division	Apps	Goals	Apps	Goals	Apps	Goals	Apps	Goals	Apps	Goals	Apps	Goals
Tupan	2021	Maranhense Série B	—		1	0	—		—		—		1	0
Grêmio Anápolis	2024	Goiano 2ª Divisão	—		11	2	—		—		—		11	2
Leixões B (loan)	2024–25	AF Porto Elite Division	7	0	—		—		—		—		7	0
Bom Jesus (loan)	2025	Goiano 3ª Divisão	—		11	1	—		—		—		11	1
Gama (loan)	2026	Série D	17	1	8	0	1	0	—		6 (Note: Appearance(s) in Copa Centro-Oeste)	0	32	1
Vitória (loan)	2026	Série A	0	0	—		—		—		—		0	0
Career total			24	1	31	3	1	0	0	0	6	0	62	4

== Titles ==
Bom Jesus

- Campeonato Goiano Terceira Divisão: 2025

Gama

- Campeonato Brasiliense: 2026
