= Túlio Maravilha =

Brazilian footballer

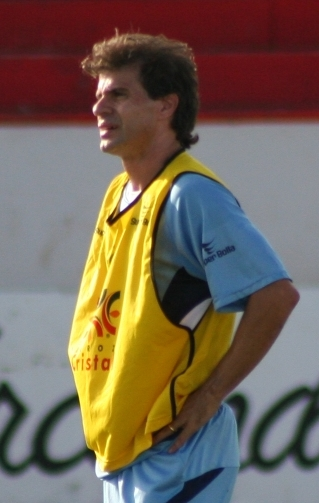
- Maravilha in 2009

Personal information
- Full name: Túlio Humberto Pereira Costa
- Date of birth: 2 June 1969 (age 57)
- Place of birth: Goiânia, Brazil
- Height: 1.72 m (5 ft 8 in)
- Position: Striker

Senior career*
Years	Team	Apps	(Gls)
1988–1992	Goiás	88	(48)
1992–1993	Sion	11	(3)
1994–1996	Botafogo	73	(55)
1997	Corinthians	33	(14)
1997	Vitória	24	(9)
1998	Fluminense	22	(10)
1998	Botafogo	24	(10)
1999–2001	Vila Nova	21	(27)
2000	São Caetano	23	(30)
2000	Botafogo	14	(4)
2001–2002	Santa Cruz	7	(1)
2002	Újpest	10	(4)
2003	Brasiliense	21	(11)
2003	Atlético Goianiense	1	(3)
2003	Tupy	2	(5)
2004	Jorge Wilstermann	16	(24)
2004	Anapolina	9	(1)
2005	Volta Redonda	16	(12)
2005	Juventude	11	(2)
2005	Al-Shabab	0	(0)
2005–2006	Volta Redonda	18	(20)
2006	Fast	10	(10)
2006	Canedense	23	(25)
2007	Itauçu	7	(7)
2008	Vila Nova	37	(24)
2009	Itumbiara	22	(14)
2009	Goiânia	10	(5)
2009–2010	Botafogo-DF	5	(1)
2010	Potyguar Seridoense	11	(6)
2011	Barras	6	(4)
2011	Canedense	1	(0)
2011	Bonsucesso	9	(3)
2012	CSE	3	(4)
2012	Tanabi	5	(1)
2012	Botafogo	0	(0)
2013	Vilavelhense	5	(5)
2014	Araxá	1	(1)
2018	Atlético Carioca	2	(0)
2018–2019	Taboão da Serra	4	(1)
Total		594	(398)

International career^{‡}
1990–1995	Brazil	15	(13)
- * Club domestic league appearances and goals as of 20 May 2009 ‡ National team caps and goals as of 20 May 2009

Túlio Humberto Pereira Costa (born 2 June 1969), sometimes simply referred as Túlio or Túlio Maravilha ("Wonder Túlio"), is a former Brazilian international footballer who played as a forward.

He played for many Brazilian club teams, such as Goiás, Botafogo, Corinthians, Vitória, Fluminense, Cruzeiro and Vila Nova and several lower-division teams in Brazil. In Europe, he had short spells, playing for Sion in Switzerland and Újpest in Hungary. He also played for the Brazil national team, scoring 13 times in 15 matches and appearing at the 1995 Copa América, where they finished 2nd. His best years were while he was at Botafogo, where he was three times the league top scorer (1989, 1994 and 1995) and won the 1995 Campeonato Brasileiro. After this he became a journeyman and never played for the same team for more than one season.

According to Tulio, he reached 1,000 goals in 2014, at 44 years old, however, this includes goals in friendlies, commemorative games and amateur football.

== International career ==
Tulio played 15 games with Brazil national team and scored 13 goals. The team never lost a match with Tulio on the pitch.

With the national team, Túlio was famous for scoring a controversial equalizer against Argentina in the quarter-finals of the 1995 Copa América in Uruguay in which he committed a deliberate handball. Túlio played one more time for the Brazil national team, scoring two goals against Colombia, at a friendly match in Manaus-AM (Vivaldo Lima stadium).

== Personal life ==
Télvio, his twin brother, was also a professional footballer and played alongside Túlio at Fluminense FC, Botafogo FR and FC Sion. His son, Tulio Humberto Pereira da Costa Filho, was born on the same date as his father.

== Honours ==
Goiás

- Campeonato Goiano: 1989, 1990, 1991

Botafogo

- Série A: 1995
- Teresa Herrera Trophy: 1996
- Torneio Rio-São Paulo: 1998

Corinthians

- Campeonato Paulista: 1997

Cruzeiro

- Recopa Sudamericana: 1998

Vila Nova

- Campeonato Goiano: 2001

São Caetano

- Campeonato Paulista Série A2: 2000

Újpest

- Hungarian Cup: 2002

Brasiliense

- Série C: 2002

Jorge Wilstermann

- Copa Aerosur: 2004

Volta Redonda

- Taça Guanabara: 2005
- Copa Finta Internacional: 2005

Itauçu

- Campeonato Goiano Third Division: 2006

Individual

- Bola de Prata: 1989, 1990, 1995
- Sharp Award: 1995
- Sony Award: 1995
- Série A: 1989, 1994, 1995
- Série B top scorer: 2008
- Série C top scorer: 2002, 2007
- Campeonato Brasiliense top scorer: 2009
- Campeonato Carioca top scorer: 1994, 1995, 2005
- Campeonato Goiano top scorer: 1991, 2001, 2008
- Campeonato Goiano Third Division top scorer: 2006
- Campeonato Paulista top scorer: 2000

== Records ==
- Goiás all-time leading scorer with 187 goals.
- Vila Nova all-time leading scorer with 99 goals.
- Holds the record for most goals scored in a single Série C, with 27 goals in 2007.
- Six time leading scorer of Campeonato Brasileiro, including Série A, B and C.
- He is the only player to be a leading scorer in three different levels in Brazilian football system (Série A, B and C).
- He was the Brazilian season scorer in 1995 (67 goals) and 2007 (50 goals).

== See also ==
- List of men's footballers with 500 or more goals
