= Lucas Emmanuel =

Brazilian footballer

Personal information
- Full name: Lucas Emmanuel Araújo Macedo
- Date of birth: 7 June 2000 (age 26)
- Place of birth: Santana, Brazil
- Height: 1.85 m (6 ft 1 in)
- Position: Forward

Youth career
- 2019: Aparecida
- 2020: Goiás

Senior career*
Years	Team	Apps	(Gls)
2021–2023	Goiás	6	(2)
2023	Aparecida	6	(2)
2024	São Caetano	0	(0)
2025	Laranja Mecânica	6	(0)
2025–2026	Southern	16	(3)
- * Club domestic league appearances and goals as of 16 May 2026

Lucas Emmanuel Araújo Macedo (born 7 June 2000), simply known as Lucas Emmanuel, is a Brazilian professional footballer who plays as a forward.

== Club career ==
Born in Santana, Bahia, Emmanuel joined Goiás' youth categories in 2020, from Aparecida. He made his first team debut on 13 January 2021, coming on as a late substitute for Vinícius Lopes in a 1–0 home loss against Atlético Goianiense, for the 2020 Campeonato Goiano.

Emmanuel scored his first senior goals on 28 January 2021, netting a brace in a 3–2 away win over Goianésia. In March, he suffered a knee injury which kept him sidelined for the remainder of the season; he still renewed his contract with the club on 26 November.

Upon returning in December 2021, Emmanuel suffered another knee injury, only fully recovering in December 2022. He made his Série A debut on 22 March 2023, replacing Diego Gonçalves in a 1–0 away win over Vasco da Gama.

On 7 July 2025, Emmanuel joined Hong Kong Premier League club Southern.

== Career statistics ==
As of 27 September 2023

Club	Season	League			State League		Cup		Continental		Other		Total	
Club	Season	Division	Apps	Goals	Apps	Goals	Apps	Goals	Apps	Goals	Apps	Goals	Apps	Goals
Goiás	2020	Série A	0	0	3	2	0	0	—		—		3	2
Goiás	2021	Série B	0	0	1	0	0	0	—		—		1	0
Goiás	2022	Série A	0	0	0	0	0	0	—		—		0	0
Goiás	2023	Série A	2	0	0	0	0	0	1 (Note: Appearance(s) in Copa Sudamericana)	0	—		3	0
Goiás	Total		2	0	4	2	0	0	1	0	—		7	2
Aparecida	2023	Goiano 2ª Divisão	—		1	0	—		—		—		1	0
Career total			2	0	5	2	0	0	1	0	0	0	8	2
