= Fabrício Manini =

Brazilian footballer (born 1980)

Personal information
- Date of birth: October 8, 1980 (age 46)
- Place of birth: Água Boa, Mato Grosso, Brazil
- Height: 1.84 m (6 ft 0 in)
- Position: Centre-back

Senior career*
Years	Team	Apps	(Gls)
2002	Rioverdense		
2003–2004	Mogi Mirim		
2005	Anapolina		
2006	Estrela-RS		
2007	Unaí		
2007	Gama		
2008	América-RN		
2008–2011	Ceará	97	(4)
2012	Oeste	10	(1)
2012–2013	Fortaleza	38	(3)
2014	Paracatu		
2014	Guarany de Sobral	6	(2)
2015	Botafogo-PB	5	(0)
- * Club domestic league appearances and goals

Fabrício Manini (born October 8, 1980) is a Brazilian former footballer who played as centre-back.

== Career ==
Manini played for Ceará from summer 2008 to the early 2012.

== Honours ==
Ceará

- Campeonato Cearense: 2011
