= Campeonato Goiano Third Division =

Football league in Goiás, Brazil

- Organising body: FGF
- Founded: 2002; 24 years ago
- Country: Brazil
- State: Goiás
- Level on pyramid: 3
- Promotion to: 2nd Division
- Current champions: Bom Jesus (2025)
- Most championships: Santa Helena (2 titles)
- Website: FGF Official website

The Campeonato Goiano – Terceira Divisão is the third tier of the professional state football league in the Brazilian state of Goiás. It is run by the Goiás Football Federation (FGF).

== List of champions ==
Season	Champions	Runners-up
2002	Aparecidense (1)	Formosa
2003	Mineiros (1)	Atlético Rioverdense
2004	Rio Quente (1)	Iporá
2005	Trindade (1)	Canedense
2006	Itauçuense (1)	Tupy
2007	Santa Helena (1)	Morrinhos
2008	União Inhumas (1)	Inhumas
2009	Atlético Rioverdense (1)	Cristalina
2010	AA Goiatuba (1)	Rio Verde
2011	Grêmio Anápolis (1)	Aparecida
2012	Caldas Novas (1)	Umuarana
2013	Novo Horizonte (1)	América de Morrinhos
2014	Itaberaí (1)	Quirinópolis
2015	ASEEV (1)	Bom Jesus
2016	Aparecida (1)	Monte Cristo
2017	Jaraguá (1)	ABECAT
2018	Morrinhos (1)	Aparecida
2019	Goiatuba EC (1)	Inhumas
2020	Not held due to the COVID-19 pandemic	
2021	Cerrado (1)	ASEEV
2022	Santa Helena (2)	Centro Oeste
2023	ABECAT (1)	Trindade
2024	Rio Verde (1)	Tupy
2025	Bom Jesus (1)	Mineiros

=== Notes ===
- Formosa Esporte Clube has no relation to Bosque Formosa Esporte Clube who plays in Campeonato Brasiliense.
- Associação Esportiva Itauçuense was changed the name to Itauçu Esporte Clube.

== Titles by team ==
Teams in bold still active.

Rank	Club	Winners	Winning years
1	**Santa Helena**	2	2007, 2022
2	**ABECAT**	1	2023
2	**Aparecida**	1	2016
2	**Aparecidense**	1	2002
2	**ASEEV**	1	2015
2	**Atlético Rioverdense**	1	2009
2	**Bom Jesus**	1	2025
2	Caldas Novas	1	2012
2	**Cerrado**	1	2021
2	AA Goiatuba	1	2010
2	**Goiatuba EC**	1	2019
2	**Grêmio Anápolis**	1	2013
2	Itaberaí	1	2014
2	Itauçuense	1	2006
2	**Jaraguá**	1	2017
2	**Mineiros**	1	2003
2	**Morrinhos**	1	2018
2	**Novo Horizonte**	1	2013
2	Rio Quente	1	2004
2	**Rio Verde**	1	2024
2	**Trindade**	1	2005
2	União Inhumas	1	2008

=== By city ===
City	Championships	Clubs
Aparecida de Goiânia	3	Aparecida (1), Aparecidense (1), Cerrado (1)
Goiatuba	2	AA Goiatuba (1), Goiatuba EC (1)
Santa Helena de Goiás	2	Santa Helena (2)
Rio Verde	2	Atlético Rioverdense (1), Rio Verde (1)
Anápolis	1	Grêmio Anápolis (1)
Bom Jesus de Goiás	1	Bom Jesus (1)
Caldas Novas	1	Caldas Novas (1)
Inhumas	1	União Inhumas (1)
Ipameri	1	Novo Horizonte (1)
Itaberaí	1	Itaberaí (1)
Itauçu	1	Itauçuense (1)
Jaraguá	1	Jaraguá (1)
Mineiros	1	Mineiros (1)
Morrinhos	1	Morrinhos (1)
Ouvidor	1	ABECAT (1)
Paraúna	1	ASEEV (1)
Rio Quente	1	Rio Quente (1)
Trindade	1	Trindade (1)
