= Flávio Barros =

Flávio Barros may refer to:

- Flávio Barros (footballer, born 1966), Brazilian football manager and former centre-back
- Flávio Barros (footballer, born 1978), Brazilian football striker
