= Diego Porfírio =

Brazilian footballer (born 1999)

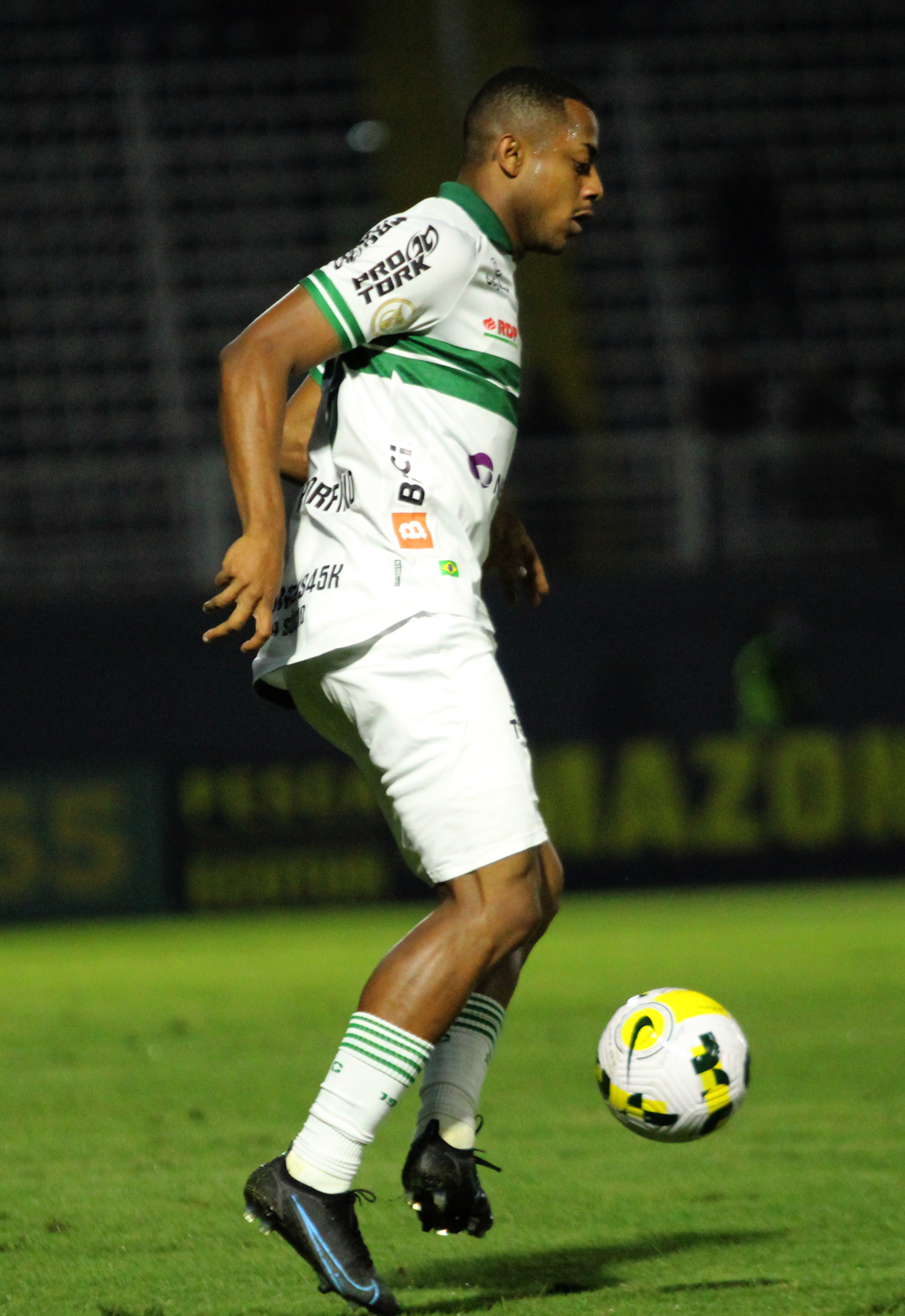

Personal information
- Full name: Diego Porfírio da Silva
- Date of birth: 1 August 1999 (age 27)
- Place of birth: Pindamonhangaba, Brazil
- Height: 1.82 m (6 ft 0 in)
- Position: Left back

Team information
- Current team: Ponte Preta (loan)
- Number: 13

Youth career
- Taubaté

Senior career*
Years	Team	Apps	(Gls)
2018–2019	Taubaté	0	(0)
2020	Democrata-GV	5	(0)
2020	Tupynambás	14	(0)
2021–2023	Desportivo Aliança	11	(0)
2021–2022	→ Ypiranga-RS (loan)	24	(2)
2022–2023	→ Coritiba (loan)	16	(0)
2023	→ Guarani (loan)	5	(0)
2026–	Pouso Alegre	11	(0)
2026–	→ Ponte Preta (loan)	11	(0)
- * Club domestic league appearances and goals as of 18 November 2026

Diego Porfírio da Silva (born 1 August 1999), known as Diego Porfírio, is a Brazilian footballer who plays as a left back for Ponte Preta on loan from Pouso Alegre.

== Club career ==
Diego was born in Pindamonhangaba, São Paulo, and was a Taubaté youth graduate. After making his senior debut in the 2018 Copa Paulista, he moved to Democrata-GV for the 2020 season.

In September 2020, Diego was announced at Tupynambás for the Série D. He began the 2021 campaign at Desportivo Aliança, before moving on loan to Série C side Ypiranga-RS on 27 May of that year.

Diego renewed his loan deal for the 2022 season on 8 December 2021, and was a regular starter during the 2022 Campeonato Gaúcho as his side reached the finals for the first time ever. On 4 April 2022, he moved to Série A side Coritiba on loan until April 2023, with a buyout clause.

Diego made his debut in the top tier of Brazilian football on 29 May 2022, coming on as a late substitute for Guilherme Biro in a 1–0 home win over Botafogo.

On 28 September 2023, Porfírio was banned from football by the Brazilian Supreme Sports Court (STJD) as result of 2023 Brazilian football match-fixing scandal.

== Career statistics ==
As of 30 May 2022

Club	Season	League			State League		Cup		Continental		Other		Total	
Club	Season	Division	Apps	Goals	Apps	Goals	Apps	Goals	Apps	Goals	Apps	Goals	Apps	Goals
Taubaté	2018	Paulista A2	—		0	0	—		—		2 (Note: Appearance(s) in Copa Paulista)	0	2	0
Taubaté	2019	Paulista A2	—		0	0	—		—		11	0	11	0
Taubaté	Total		—		0	0	—		—		13	0	13	0
Democrata-GV	2020	Mineiro Módulo II	—		5	0	—		—		—		5	0
Tupynambás	2020	Série D	14	0	—		—		—		—		14	0
Desportivo Aliança	2021	Alagoano	—		11	0	—		—		—		11	0
Ypiranga-RS	2021	Série C	11	0	—		—		—		—		11	0
Ypiranga-RS	2022	Série C	0	0	13	2	—		—		—		13	2
Ypiranga-RS	Total		11	0	13	2	—		—		—		24	2
Coritiba (loan)	2022	Série A	1	0	—		—		—		—		1	0
Career total			26	0	24	2	0	0	0	0	13	0	63	2
