= Kevin Lomónaco =

Argentine footballer

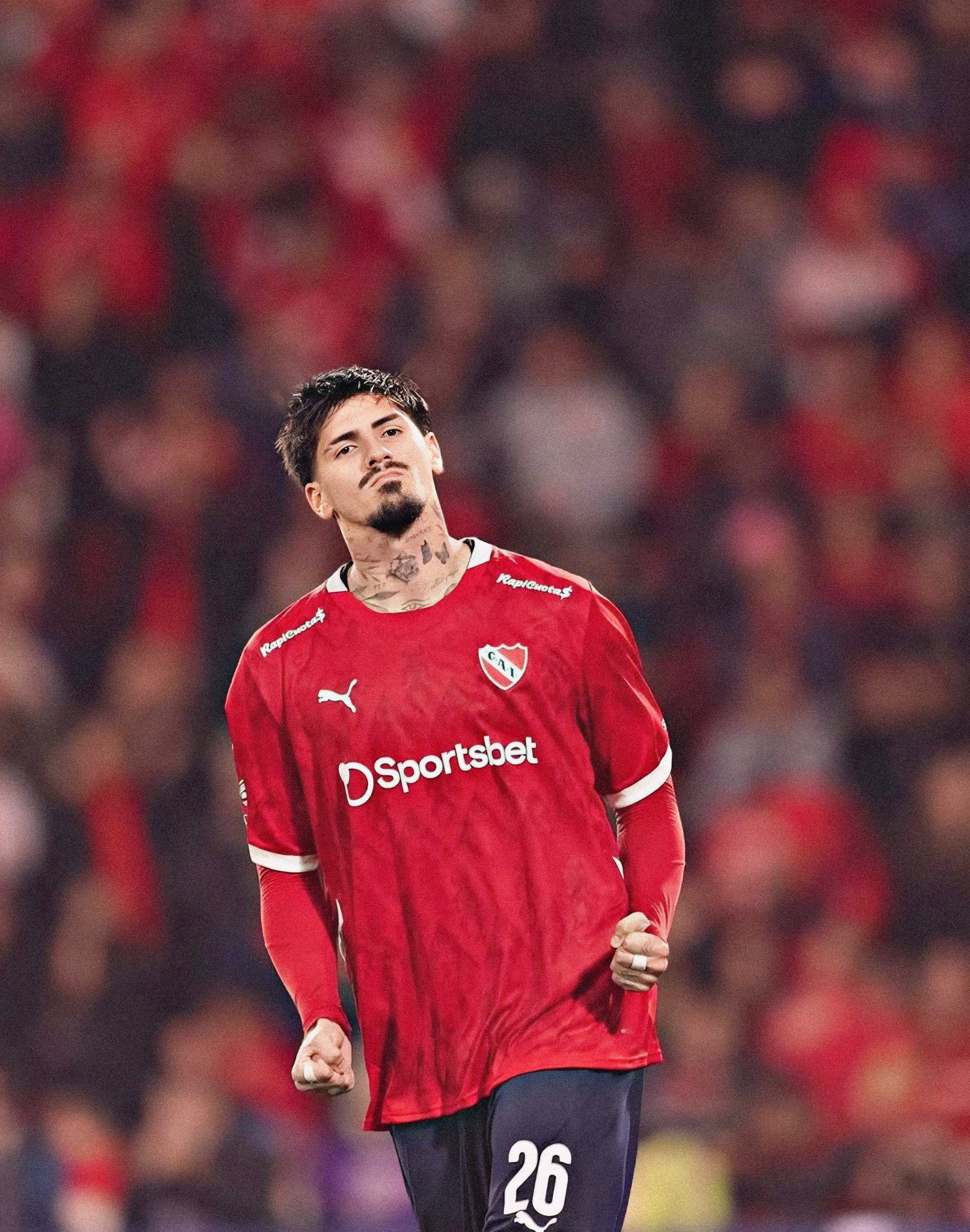
- Lomónaco with Club Atlético Independiente in 2025

Personal information
- Full name: Kevin Joel Lomónaco
- Date of birth: 8 January 2002 (age 24)
- Place of birth: La Plata, Argentina
- Height: 1.92 m (6 ft 4 in)
- Position: Centre-back

Team information
- Current team: Elche

Youth career
- Lanús

Senior career*
Years	Team	Apps	(Gls)
2020–2022	Lanús	7	(0)
2021	→ Platense (loan)	11	(1)
2022–2025	Red Bull Bragantino	19	(0)
2023–2024	→ Tigre (loan)	6	(0)
2024–2025	→ Independiente (loan)	36	(2)
2025–2026	Independiente	39	(0)
2026–	Elche	0	(0)

International career
2019	Argentina U17		
- * Club domestic league appearances and goals as of 31 August 2026

Kevin Joel Lomónaco (born 8 January 2002) is an Argentine professional footballer who plays as a centre-back for La Liga club Elche.

== Club career ==
=== Lanús ===
Lomónaco is a product of the Lanús youth system. He made the breakthrough into the club's first-team in 2020, initially appearing in pre-season under manager Luis Zubeldía; notably participating in a friendly against Vélez Sarsfield in October. In November, the centre-back was an unused substitute for a Copa de la Liga Profesional fixture with Newell's Old Boys and a Copa Sudamericana encounter with Bolívar.

Lomónaco's senior debut arrived on 13 December 2020, against Aldosivi, as he featured for the final four minutes of a 2–1 away win. On 1 September 2021, Lomónaco joined Platense on a loan for the rest of the year.

=== Red Bull Bragantino ===
In April 2022, Lomónaco joined Campeonato Brasileiro Série A side Red Bull Bragantino on a five-year deal. He featured sparingly during the season, contributing with 17 appearances overall.

On 19 April 2023, Lomónaco was separated from Bragantino's first team squad, after having his name included in the 2023 Brazilian football match-fixing scandal.

==== Tigre (loan) ====
On 28 July 2023, Bragantino sent Lomónaco on a season-long loan to Argentine Primera División side Tigre, with a future option to make the move permanent.

=== Elche ===
On 1 September 2026, after a two-year spell at Independiente, Lomónaco joined La Liga side Elche on a four-year contract.

== International career ==
In 2019, Lomónaco represented Argentina at U17 level. After making seven appearances at the South American U-17 Championship in Peru as they won the trophy, he subsequently appeared four times at the FIFA U-17 World Cup in Brazil. He also received a call-up for the 2019 Granatkin Memorial, which they won. In December 2020, Lomónaco was selected to train with the U20s.

== Involvement in match-fixing scandal ==
In May 2023, Lomónaco admitted to receiving BR$ 30,000 in bribes for getting a yellow card during a Campeonato Brasileiro Série A match against América Mineiro. He was judged on 1 June, receiving a 380-day ban and being charged a R$25,000 fine.

== Career statistics ==
As of 22 May 2023.

Appearances and goals by club, season and competition
Club	Season	League			Cup		Continental		State League		Other		Total	
Club	Season	Division	Apps	Goals	Apps	Goals	Apps	Goals	Apps	Goals	Apps	Goals	Apps	Goals
Lanús	2020–21	Primera División	2 (Note: Soccerway counts Copa de la Liga Profesional appearances as league appearances.)	0	0	0	0	0	—		—		2	0
Lanús	2022	Primera División	5	0	1	0	0	0	—		—		6	0
Lanús	Total		7	0	1	0	0	0	—		—		8	0
Platense (loan)	2021	Primera División	11	0	0	0	—		—		—		11	0
Red Bull Bragantino	2022	Série A	16	0	1	0	0	0	—		—		17	0
Red Bull Bragantino	2023	Série A	0	0	0	0	0	0	3 (Note: Appearance(s) in Campeonato Paulista)	0	—		3	0
Red Bull Bragantino	Total		16	0	1	0	0	0	3	0	—		20	0
Career total			34	0	2	0	0	0	3	0	0	0	39	0

== Honours ==
Argentina U17

- South American U-17 Championship: 2019
- Granatkin Memorial: 2019
