= Ygor Catatau =

Brazilian footballer (born 1995)

Personal information
- Full name: Ygor de Oliveira Ferreira
- Date of birth: 1 July 1995 (age 31)
- Place of birth: Rio de Janeiro, Brazil
- Height: 1.83 m (6 ft 0 in)
- Positions: Winger; attacking midfielder

Team information
- Current team: CRB (on loan from Volta Redonda)

Youth career
- Madureira

Senior career*
| Years | Team | Apps | (Gls) |
| 2015–2023 | Madureira | 44 | (5) |
| 2017 | → Barra da Tijuca (loan) | 18 | (12) |
| 2018 | → Boa Esporte (loan) | 8 | (0) |
| 2019 | → Barra da Tijuca (loan) | 10 | (3) |
| 2020–2021 | → Vasco da Gama (loan) | 19 | (1) |
| 2021 | → Vitória (loan) | 8 | (1) |
| 2021–2022 | → Mumbai City (loan) | 11 | (3) |
| 2022–2023 | → Sampaio Corrêa (loan) | 19 | (6) |
| 2023 | Sepahan | 11 | (1) |
| 2025– | Volta Redonda | 34 | (9) |
| 2026– | → CRB (loan) | 8 | (1) |
- * Club domestic league appearances and goals as of 17 November 2026

Ygor de Oliveira Ferreira (born 1 July 1995), known as Ygor Catatau, is a Brazilian professional footballer. Previous banned from the sports, he currently plays as a winger for CRB, on loan from Volta Redonda.

== Club career ==
Born in Rio de Janeiro, Ygor was a Madureira youth graduate, having joined the side in 2015 at the age of 20. He made his first team debut on 26 August of that year, playing the last 15 minutes of a 1–1 Copa Rio away draw against Macaé, and scored his first goal on 30 September by netting the second of a 2–0 home win against the same opponent.

After failing to establish himself in the main squad, Ygor spent the 2017 season on loan at Barra da Tijuca, being the club's top goalscorer in the Campeonato Carioca Série B1. Upon returning, he featured more regularly in the 2018 Campeonato Carioca before moving to Boa Esporte also in a temporary deal.

In 2019, Ygor returned to Barra da Tijuca also in a loan deal. He returned to Madureira for the 2020 Campeonato Carioca, scoring three goals in the competition.

On 30 July 2020, still owned by Madureira, Ygor was announced at Série A side Vasco da Gama. He made his debut in the category on 2 September, starting in a 2–2 away draw against Santos.

On 24 September 2021, Mumbai City announced that Ygor had joined the Indian Super League club on a season-long loan. He scored his debut goal for Mumbai against FC Goa on 22 November, in a 3–0 win. He scored his second goal against Bengaluru FC on 4 December, in their 3–1 win.

In September 11, 2023, Ygor was permanently banned from football after being judged in a match-fixing scandal at the time he was playing for Sampaio Corrêa.

Banned from football, he had his sentence reviewed after 2 years and two months away from the sport, returning to his career at Volta Redonda FC, a team in the 2025 Campeonato Brasileiro Série B dispute, on September 10, 2025. On October 13, he scored his first goal.

== Career statistics ==
As of 29 November 2020

| Club | Season | League | | | State League | | Cup | | Continental | | Other | | Total | |
| Club | Season | Division | Apps | Goals | Apps | Goals | Apps | Goals | Apps | Goals | Apps | Goals | Apps | Goals |
|---|---|---|---|---|---|---|---|---|---|---|---|---|---|---|
| Madureira | 2015 | Série C | 1 | 0 | 0 | 0 | 0 | 0 | — | | 7 (Note: Appearance(s) in Copa Rio) | 1 | 8 | 1 |
| Madureira | 2016 | Série D | 4 | 0 | 0 | 0 | — | | — | | 2 | 0 | 2 | 0 |
| Madureira | 2017 | Carioca | — | | 0 | 0 | — | | — | | — | | 0 | 0 |
| Madureira | 2018 | Série D | 0 | 0 | 9 | 1 | 1 | 0 | — | | 1 | 0 | 11 | 1 |
| Madureira | 2019 | Carioca | — | | 6 | 0 | — | | — | | 2 | 0 | 8 | 0 |
| Madureira | 2020 | Carioca | — | | 11 | 3 | — | | — | | — | | 11 | 3 |
| Madureira | 2022 | Carioca | — | | 4 | 2 | — | | — | | — | | 4 | 2 |
| Madureira | Total | | 5 | 0 | 30 | 6 | 1 | 0 | — | | 12 | 1 | 48 | 7 |
| Barra da Tijuca (loan) | 2017 | Carioca Série B1 | — | | 18 | 12 | — | | — | | — | | 18 | 12 |
| Boa Esporte (loan) | 2018 | Série B | 8 | 0 | — | | — | | — | | — | | 8 | 0 |
| Barra da Tijuca (loan) | 2019 | Carioca Série B1 | — | | 10 | 3 | — | | — | | — | | 10 | 3 |
| Vasco da Gama (loan) | 2020 | Série A | 9 | 1 | — | | 2 | 0 | 2 (Note: Appearance(s) in Copa Sudamericana) | 0 | — | | 13 | 1 |
| Vitória (loan) | 2021 | Série B | 8 | 1 | 6 | 0 | 5 | 0 | | | 8 | 2 | 27 | 3 |
| Mumbai City (loan) | 2021–22 | Indian Super League | 11 | 3 | — | | — | | — | | — | | 11 | 3 |
| Sepahan FC | 2022-23 | Iran Pro League | 11 | 1 | 1 | 0 | — | | — | | — | | 11 | 1 |
| Career total | | | 44 | 6 | 65 | 21 | 8 | 0 | 2 | 0 | 20 | 3 | 135 | 30 |
