= Télvio =

Brazilian footballer

Personal information
- Full name: Télvio Henrique Pereira Costa
- Date of birth: 2 June 1969 (age 57)
- Place of birth: Goiânia, Brazil
- Height: 1.72 m (5 ft 8 in)
- Position: Forward

Senior career*
Years	Team	Apps	(Gls)
1990	Vila Nova		(13)
1991	Fluminense	4	(0)
1992	Goiatuba		
1992–1993	Sion		
1994–1995	Savièse		
1996	Botafogo		
1999	Francana		
- * Club domestic league appearances and goals as of 2 March 2024

Télvio Henrique Pereira Costa (born 2 June 1969), simply known as Télvio or Télvio Furacão, is a Brazilian former professional footballer who played as a forward.

== Career ==
Twin brother of Túlio Maravilha, Télvio had a more modest career. For Vila Nova, he scored 13 goals in total, being one of the teams where he stood out the most, as well as at Goiatuba EC where he was part of the state champion squad in 1992. He also played for Fluminense, Botafogo and FC Sion, when he was hired alongside Túlio. He also played for FC Savièse in the Switzerland, and ended his career in 1999 in Francana.

== Honours ==
Goiatuba

- Campeonato Goiano: 1992
