= Gabriel Tota =

Brazilian footballer (born 2001)

Personal information
- Full name: Gabriel Ferreira Neris
- Date of birth: 29 October 2001 (age 24)
- Place of birth: Santa Fé do Sul, Brazil
- Height: 1.83 m (6 ft 0 in)
- Position: Midfielder

Team information
- Current team: Pouso Alegre
- Number: 8

Youth career
- Araçatuba
- América-SP
- 2016: Andradina EC
- 2017–2020: Novorizontino
- 2021–2022: Mirassol

Senior career*
Years	Team	Apps	(Gls)
2020–2021	Novorizontino	0	(0)
2020–2021	→ Rio Preto (loan)	18	(3)
2021–2022	Mirassol	1	(0)
2022–2023	Juventude	13	(1)
2023	→ Ypiranga-RS (loan)	1	(0)
2026–	Pouso Alegre	9	(2)
- * Club domestic league appearances and goals as of 19:40, 25 February 2026 (UTC)

Gabriel Ferreira Neris (born 29 October 2001), known as Gabriel Tota, is a Brazilian footballer who plays as a midfielder for Pouso Alegre.

== Club career ==
Born in Santa Fé do Sul, São Paulo, Gabriel Tota represented Araçatuba, América-SP, Andradina Esporte Clube and Novorizontino as a youth. He made his senior debut while on loan at Rio Preto in 2020.

In 2021, Gabriel Tota moved to Mirassol and returned to the under-20 squad. He first appeared with the main squad on 25 September of that year, starting in a 1–2 Série C home loss against former side Novorizontino.

On 22 January 2022, after impressing in the year's Copa São Paulo de Futebol Júnior, Gabriel Tota was one of the nine players definitely promoted to Mirassol's first team, but moved to Série A side Juventude five days later, on a four-year contract.

Gabriel Tota made his debut for Ju on 3 February 2022, coming on as a second-half substitute for Jadson and scoring the opener in a 1–1 Campeonato Gaúcho home draw against Novo Hamburgo. He first appeared in the top tier on 21 May, replacing Rodrigo Soares in a 3–0 home loss against Palmeiras.

Loaned to Ypiranga-RS on 14 April 2023, Gabriel Tota played twice for the club before having his loan terminated on 14 May, after being included in the 2023 Brazilian football match-fixing scandal. Three days later, Juventude terminated his contract.

On 1 June 2023, Gabriel Tota was permanently banned from football after being judged in the match-fixing scandal, and was charged a R$ 30,000 fine. While suspended, he played amateur tournaments in Minas Gerais and also played in the Kings League, before signing for Pouso Alegre for the 2026 season after his ban was upheld.

== Career statistics ==
As of 25 February 2026

Club	Season	League			State League		Cup		Continental		Other		Total	
Club	Season	Division	Apps	Goals	Apps	Goals	Apps	Goals	Apps	Goals	Apps	Goals	Apps	Goals
Rio Preto	2020	Paulista A3	—		4	2	—		—		4 (Note: Appearance(s) in Copa Paulista)	0	8	2
Rio Preto	2021	Paulista A3	—		14	1	—		—		—		14	1
Rio Preto	Total		—		18	3	—		—		4	0	22	3
Mirassol	2021	Série C	1	0	—		—		—		—		1	0
Juventude	2022	Série A	7	0	6	1	0	0	—		—		13	1
Juventude	2023	Série B	0	0	0	0	0	0	—		—		0	0
Juventude	Total		7	0	6	1	0	0	—		—		13	1
Ypiranga-RS (loan)	2023	Série C	1	0	—		1	0	—		—		2	0
Pouso Alegre	2026	Série D	0	0	9	2	—		—		—		9	2
Career total			9	0	33	6	1	0	0	0	4	0	47	6
