= Estádio Annibal Batista de Toledo =

Stadium in Aparecida de Goiânia, Brazil

Annibal Batista de Toledo
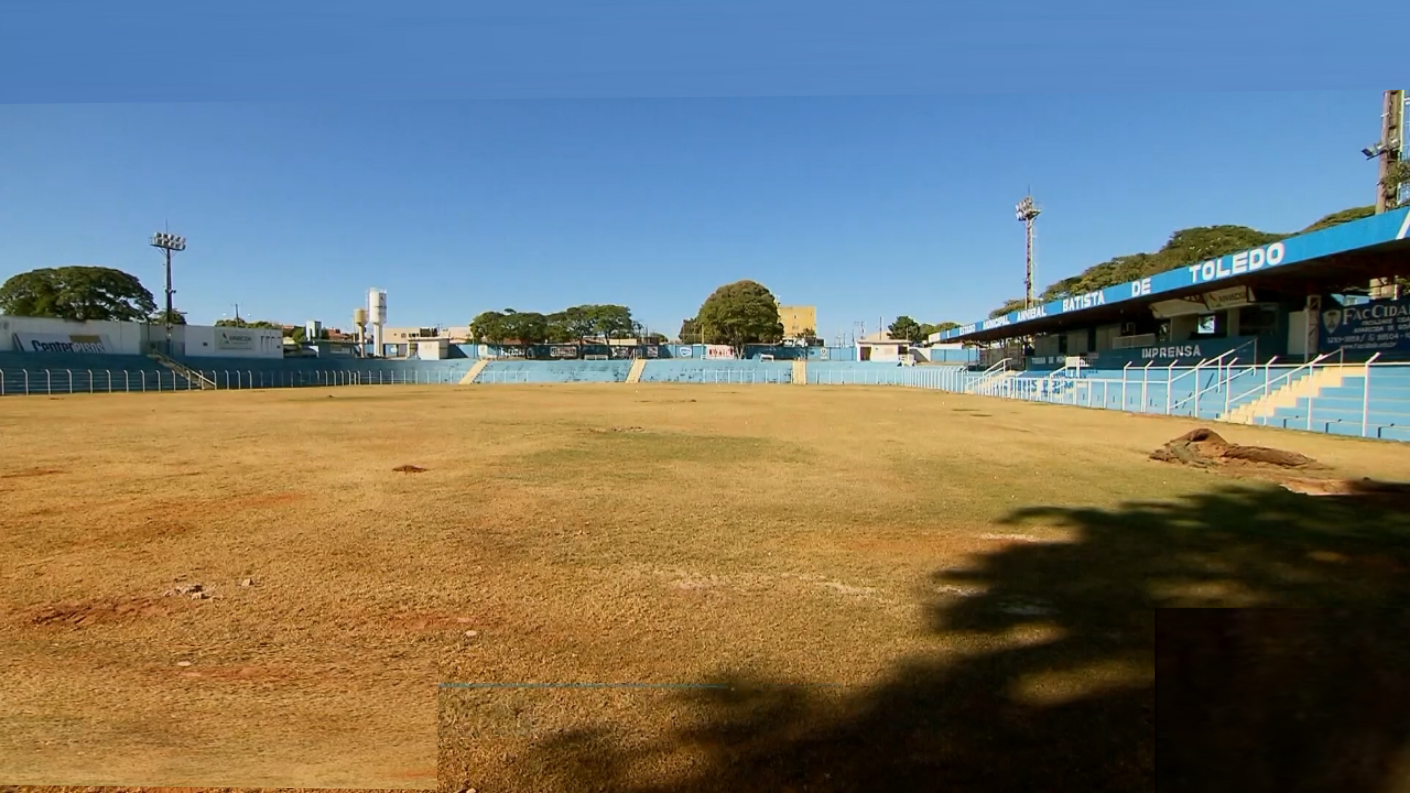
- Interactive map of Annibal Batista de Toledo
- Full name: Estádio Municipal Annibal Batista de Toledo
- Location: Aparecida de Goiânia, GO, Brazil
- Coordinates: 16.819890787277224°S 49.245574915795345°W
- Owner: City of Aparecida de Goiânia/State of Goiás
- Operator: City of Aparecida de Goiânia/State of Goiás
- Capacity: 6,645
- Surface: Natural grass
- Field size: 105 × 68 m

Construction
- Renovated: 2020
- Expanded: 2020

Tenants
- Aparecidense; Aparecida

Estádio Municipal Annibal Batista de Toledo is a multi-use stadium in Aparecida de Goiânia, Goiás, Brazil. It is used mostly for football matches, and has a maximum capacity of 6,645 people.

In July 2019, the city council of Aparecida de Goiânia announced that an expansion and renovation process was to be held on the stadium. The work finished nearly one year later.
