= Matheus Gomes =

Brazilian footballer

Personal information
- Full name: Matheus Philippe Coutinho Gomes
- Date of birth: 2 October 1995 (age 31)
- Place of birth: Três Marias, Brazil
- Height: 1.89 m (6 ft 2 in)
- Position: Goalkeeper

Youth career
- 2013–2016: Fluminense

Senior career*
Years	Team	Apps	(Gls)
2016–2017	Fluminense	0	(0)
2018	Ipatinga		
2018–2019	Macaé		
2019	América-TO		
2019	Serra Macaense		
2020	Paulista		
2020	São Gonçalo EC		
2021	Tocantins		
2021	São Gonçalo EC		
2022	Olaria	6	(0)
2022–2023	Sergipe		
- * Club domestic league appearances and goals

Matheus Philippe Coutinho Gomes (born 2 October 1995), better known as Matheus Gomes, is a Brazilian former professional footballer who played as a goalkeeper.

== Career ==
Matheus Gomes started his career at Fluminense FC, and although as third goalkeeper, he was champion of the 2016 Primeira Liga. He also played through Ipatinga, Macaé, América de Teófilo Otoni, Serra Macaense, Paulista, São Gonçalo EC and Tocantins de Miracema. In 2022, he also played six matches for Olaria in Campeonato Carioca Série A2. In September 2022, signed with CS Sergipe.

== Match-fixing scandal ==
Matheus Gomes is detailed in "Fato 10", about the match Sport Recife vs. Operário Ferroviário, occurred 28 October 2022, for the Round 37 of the 2022 Campeonato Brasileiro Série B.

According to the public prosecutor, on the 27th and 28 October 2022, in the state of São Paulo and the municipality of Recife, Matheus Gomes would have promised, alongside the bet handlers Bruno Lopes de Moura, Ícaro Fernando Calixto dos Santos and Victor Yamasaki Fernandes, give illicit financial advantage to the match between Sport Recife and Operário. Matheus had initiated the manipulation and acted as intermediary between those involved. The agreement was for player Fernando Neto (Operário Ferroviário) to receive a red card - which he did not achieve, although, according to investigators, he tried. The promise was to pay R$ 500,000, with R$40,000 paid to Fernando Neto.

On 2 June 2023, Matheus Gomes was permanently banned from football after being judged in the match-fixing scandal.

== Post-playing career ==
After the ban in professional football, it was reported that Matheus worked as an app driver.

== Honours ==
Fluminense

- Primeira Liga: 2016
