= Pedrinho (footballer, born 2002) =

Brazilian footballer

Personal information
- Full name: Pedro Henrique Azevedo Pereira
- Date of birth: 11 July 2002 (age 24)
- Place of birth: Salvador, Brazil
- Height: 1.77 m (5 ft 10 in)
- Position: Left back

Team information
- Current team: Shakhtar Donetsk
- Number: 13

Youth career
- Vitória

Senior career*
Years	Team	Apps	(Gls)
2021	Vitória	20	(0)
2021–2023	Athletico Paranaense	59	(0)
2023–	Shakhtar Donetsk	58	(1)
- * Club domestic league appearances and goals as of 24 October 2026

Pedro Henrique Azevedo Pereira (born 11 July 2002), commonly known as Pedrinho or Pedro Henrique, is a Brazilian footballer who plays as a left back for Shakhtar Donetsk.

== Club career ==
=== Vitória ===
Born in Salvador, Bahia, Pedrinho was a Vitória youth graduate. He made his first team debut on 29 January 2021, coming on as a half-time substitute for Alisson Farias in a 1–0 Série B away win over Brasil de Pelotas.

Definitely promoted to the main squad for the 2021 campaign, Pedrinho renewed his contract until 2024 on 20 February 2021. He soon became a regular starter for the side, and was named the 2021 Campeonato Baiano Breakthrough player.

On 20 August 2021, amidst transfer negotiations with Athletico Paranaense, Vitória rescinded Pedrinho's contract. On 2 September, Vitória released a statement saying that despite the "conclusion of the transfer", Pedrinho's contract with Athletico was not registered, nor his contract with Vitória was not reinstated upon his return to Salvador.

=== Athletico Paranaense ===
On 17 September 2021, Athletico announced Pedrinho after the player signed a five-year contract. Despite agreeing on a R$ 8.5 million fee for his transfer, Athletico signed the player on a free transfer as his contract with Vitória was previously terminated; Athletico alleged that the player was a free agent at the time of the signature, and that the transfer was not completed due to problems with Vitória and Pablo Siles' agents, as the club planned to sign both players together on a R$10 million deal. In October, Athletico agreed to pay Vitória around R$3 million for the transfers of Pedrinho and Siles, while discounting R$3 million due to a debt of Vitória to Athletico over Léo Morais in 2013, and also paying another R$3 million for the transfer of Siles to Danubio.

Pedrinho made his Série A debut on 2 November 2021, replacing Nicolás Hernández in a 2–2 home draw against Flamengo. A backup to Abner Vinícius during the 2021 and 2022 seasons, he became a starter in 2023 after Abner left for Betis.

On 12 May 2023, Pedrinho and teammate Bryan García were fired from the club, after having their names linked to the 2023 Brazilian football match-fixing scandal.

== Career statistics ==
As of match played 3 November 2026

Club	Season	League			State League		Cup		Continental		Other		Total	
Club	Season	Division	Apps	Goals	Apps	Goals	Apps	Goals	Apps	Goals	Apps	Goals	Apps	Goals
Vitória	2020	Série B	1	0	0	0	0	0	—		—		1	0
Vitória	2021	Série B	14	0	5	0	5	0	—		9 (Note: Appearance(s) in Copa do Nordeste)	0	33	0
Vitória	Total		15	0	5	0	5	0	—		9	0	34	0
Athletico Paranaense	2021	Série A	11	0	—		—		0	0	—		11	0
Athletico Paranaense	2022	Série A	21	0	10	0	4	0	2 (Note: Appearance(s) in Copa Libertadores)	0	0	0	37	0
Athletico Paranaense	2023	Série A	4	0	13	0	2	0	3	0	—		22	0
Athletico Paranaense	Total		36	0	23	0	6	0	5	0	0	0	70	0
Shakhtar Donetsk	2023–24	Ukrainian Premier League	9	0	—		1	0	1 (Note: Appearance(s) in UEFA Europa League)	0	—		11	0
Shakhtar Donetsk	2024–25	Ukrainian Premier League	22	0	—		3	0	6 (Note: Appearance(s) in UEFA Champions League)	0	—		31	0
Shakhtar Donetsk	2025–26	Ukrainian Premier League	18	0	—		0	0	12 (Note: Five appearances in UEFA Europa League, six appearances and one goal in UEFA Conference League)	1	0	0	30	1
Shakhtar Donetsk	2026–27	Ukrainian Premier League	9	1	—		1	0	4	0	—		14	1
Shakhtar Donetsk	Total		58	1	—		5	0	23	1	—		86	2
Career total			109	1	28	0	15	0	29	1	9	0	190	2

== Honours ==
Athletico Paranaense

- Campeonato Paranaense: 2023
- Copa Sudamericana: 2021

Shakhtar Donetsk

- Ukrainian Cup: 2024–25

Individual

- Campeonato Baiano Breakthrough player: 2021
- SportArena Player of the Round: 2025–26 (Round 7)
- UEFA Conference League Team of the Season: 2025–26
