= Bryan García (Ecuadorian footballer) =

Ecuadorian footballer (born 2001)

Personal information
- Full name: Bryan Jahir García Realpe
- Date of birth: 18 January 2001 (age 25)
- Place of birth: Rioverde, Ecuador
- Height: 1.75 m (5 ft 9 in)
- Position: Midfielder

Youth career
- 2016–2017: Ciudadelas del Norte
- 2018–2019: Independiente del Valle

Senior career*
| Years | Team | Apps | (Gls) |
| 2016–2017 | Ciudadelas del Norte | 0 | (0) |
| 2020 | Independiente Juniors | 4 | (1) |
| 2020–2021 | Independiente del Valle | 42 | (2) |
| 2022–2023 | Athletico Paranaense | 11 | (0) |
- * Club domestic league appearances and goals as of 22:26, 12 May 2023 (UTC)

Bryan Jahir García Realpe (born 18 January 2001) is an Ecuadorian footballer who plays as midfielder.

== Club career ==
=== Early career ===
Born in Rioverde, García began his career at local side Ciudadelas del Norte in 2016, aged just 15, in the Segunda Categoría.

=== Independiente del Valle ===
García joined Independiente del Valle's youth setup in 2018, playing for the under-18 and under-20 squads and winning the 2020 U-20 Copa Libertadores with the latter. Later in that year, he made his senior debut with the reserve team Independiente Juniors in the Ecuadorian Serie B.

García made his first team – and Serie A – debut on 30 August 2020, coming on as a second-half substitute for Gabriel Torres in a 3–0 home win over Guayaquil City. He scored his first professional goal the following 1 August, netting his team's fourth in a 4–0 home routing of Macará.

=== Athletico Paranaense ===
On 22 January 2022, García moved abroad and signed a four-year contract with Campeonato Brasileiro Série A side Athletico Paranaense. On 12 May 2023, he and teammate Pedrinho were fired from the club, after having their names linked to the 2023 Brazilian football match-fixing scandal.

== Involvement in match-fixing scandal ==
On 22 May 2023, García reached an agreement with the Public Ministry of Goiás to become a witness in the investigation; he admitted to have received a financial compensation to receive a yellow card in a match against Fluminense, in the 25th round of the 2022 Série A.

== Career statistics ==
As of 12 May 2023

| Club | Season | League | | | Cup | | Continental | | State League | | Other | | Total | |
| Club | Season | Division | Apps | Goals | Apps | Goals | Apps | Goals | Apps | Goals | Apps | Goals | Apps | Goals |
|---|---|---|---|---|---|---|---|---|---|---|---|---|---|---|
| Ciudadelas del Norte | 2016 | Segunda Categoría | 0 | 0 | — | | — | | — | | 4 (Note: Appearance(s) in Campeonato Provincial de Segunda Categoría de Cañar) | 0 | 4 | 0 |
| Ciudadelas del Norte | 2017 | Segunda Categoría | 0 | 0 | — | | — | | — | | 10 | 2 | 10 | 2 |
| Ciudadelas del Norte | Total | | 0 | 0 | — | | — | | — | | 14 | 2 | 14 | 2 |
| Independiente Juniors | 2020 | Ecuadorian Serie B | 4 | 1 | — | | — | | — | | — | | 4 | 1 |
| Independiente del Valle | 2020 | Ecuadorian Serie A | 15 | 0 | — | | 3 (Note: Appearance(s) in Copa Libertadores) | 0 | — | | 0 | 0 | 18 | 0 |
| Independiente del Valle | 2021 | Ecuadorian Serie A | 27 | 2 | — | | 10 (Note: Eight appearances in Copa Libertadores, two appearances in Copa Sudamericana) | 0 | — | | 1 (Note: Appearance(s) in Supercopa Ecuador) | 1 | 38 | 3 |
| Independiente del Valle | Total | | 42 | 2 | — | | 13 | 0 | — | | 1 | 1 | 56 | 3 |
| Athletico Paranaense | 2022 | Série A | 7 | 0 | 0 | 0 | 3 | 0 | — | | 0 | 0 | 10 | 0 |
| Athletico Paranaense | 2023 | Série A | 1 | 0 | 0 | 0 | 0 | 0 | 3 (Note: Appearance(s) in Campeonato Paranaense) | 0 | 0 | 0 | 4 | 0 |
| Athletico Paranaense | Total | | 8 | 0 | 0 | 0 | 3 | 0 | 3 | 0 | 0 | 0 | 14 | 0 |
| Career total | | | 54 | 3 | 0 | 0 | 16 | 0 | 3 | 0 | 15 | 3 | 88 | 6 |

== Honours ==
Independiente del Valle

- U-20 Copa Libertadores: 2020
- Ecuadorian Serie A: 2021

Athletico Paranaense

- Campeonato Paranaense: 2023
