= Mineiros Esporte Clube =

Mineiros
- Full name: Mineiros Esporte Clube
- Nickname: Águia do Vale
- Founded: January 20, 1977
- Ground: Estádio Odilon Flores, Mineiros, Goiás state, Brazil
- Capacity: 7,000
Home colours	Away colours

Mineiros Esporte Clube, commonly known as Mineiros, is a Brazilian football club based in Mineiros, Goiás state. They competed in the Copa do Brasil once.

== History ==
The club was founded on January 20, 1977. They won the Campeonato Goiano (Third Division) in 2003, and the Campeonato Goiano (Second Division) in 2004. Mineiros competed in the Copa do Brasil in 2006, when they were eliminated in the Second Round by Atlético Mineiro after eliminating Americano in the First Round.

== Honours ==
- Campeonato Goiano Second Division
  - Winners (1): 2004
- Campeonato Goiano Third Division
  - Winners (1): 2003

== Stadium ==
Mineiros Esporte Clube play their home games at Estádio Odilon Flores. The stadium has a maximum capacity of 7,000 people.

== Players ==
=== Squad 2021 ===
As of 24 October 2021. Source: FGF

Note: Flags indicate national team as defined under FIFA eligibility rules; some limited exceptions apply. Players may hold more than one non-FIFA nationality.

No.	Pos.	Nation	Player
1	GK	BRA	Rodrigo Antunes Miranda
2	RB	BRA	John Albert Mendes
3	DF	BRA	Martin Uche Ezekulie
4	DF	BRA	Mateus Magallanes
5	DF	BRA	Issa Kone
6	LB	BRA	Jean Brandao Porto
7	FW	BRA	Carlos Victor Pereira
8	MF	BRA	Claudson Pereira
9	FW	BRA	Genylson Souza Lima
10	FW	BRA	Maikon Ferreira Souza
11	FW	BRA	Paulo Ricardo da Silva

No.	Pos.	Nation	Player
12	GK	BRA	Stenio da Silva Souza
13	RB	BRA	Fredson dos Santos
14	FW	BRA	Pedro Henrique Silva
15	DF	BRA	Klayton da Silva
16	MF	BRA	Vitor Hugo Soares
17	LB	BRA	Felipe Fernandes
18	FW	BRA	..Matheus Carlos Silva
