= Itauçu Esporte Clube =

Brazilian football club

- Full name: Itauçu
- Founded: May 31, 1986
- Ground: Estádio Ronan Maia, Itauçu, Goiás state, Brazil
- Capacity: 4,000
- President: Denis Marques dos Reis
Home colours	Away colours	colours

Itauçu Esporte Clube, commonly known as Itauçu, is a Brazilian football club based in Itauçu, Goiás state.

== History ==
The club was founded on May 31, 1986, with the name of Associação Esportiva Itauçuense, in 2007 it was renamed Itauçu Esporte Clube. In 2010, the weather changed from Ituaçu to Nerópolis and changed its name to Nerópolis Esporte Clube. But in 2014 he returned to his hometown, and played in the Campeonato Goiano (Third Division).

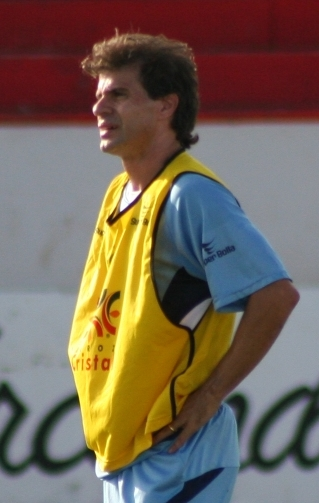
Tulio Maravilha

The team debuted professionally in 2006 at Campeonato Goiano (Third Division). The team, already in the debut season in professional football, reached the title by thrashing Tupy (de Jussara) in the final, 3x0. Altogether there were seven games with five wins, a draw and just one defeat. Highlight for Tulio Maravilha, top scorer of the competition with seven goals scored.

== Stadium ==
Itauçu Esporte Clube play their home games at Estádio Cruzeiro do Sul. The stadium has a maximum capacity of 5,000 people.

== Title ==
- Campeonato Goiano (Third Division) (2006)
