= Romário (footballer, born 2002) =

Brazilian footballer

Personal information
- Full name: Marcos Vinicius Alves Barreira
- Date of birth: 28 May 2002 (age 24)
- Place of birth: Goiânia, Brazil
- Position: Attacking midfielder

Youth career
- –2019: Vila Nova

Senior career*
Years	Team	Apps	(Gls)
2019–2022	Vila Nova	10	(0)
2021	→ Atlético Goianiense (loan)		
2022	→ Athletico Paranaense (loan)		
2023	Goiânia	7	(0)
- * Club domestic league appearances and goals as of 27 October 2023

Marcos Vinicius Alves Barreira (born 28 May 2002), better known as Romário, is a Brazilian former professional footballer who played as an attacking midfielder.

== Career ==
Romário started his career at Vila Nova, and also played for Atlético Goianiense, Athletico Paranaense and Goiânia.

== Match-fixing scandal ==
Romário was one of the precursors of "Operação Penalidade Máxima", which aimed to look for irregularities committed in football matches in Brazil for profit on betting sites. Romário allegedly coerced clubmates into committing a penalty foul in the Vila Nova vs Sport Recife match, 6 November 2022, valid for 2022 Campeonato Brasileiro Série B. Upon becoming aware of what had happened internally, Vila Nova's directive management resigned with the player, on 30 November 2022. Subsequently, a complaint was filed with the public prosecutor, which resulted in the operation.

On 29 May 2023, Romário was permanently banned from football after being judged in the match-fixing scandal.
