= Associação Esportiva Evangélica =

Football club in the Guapó, state of Goiás, Brazil

- Full name: Associação Esportiva Evangélica
- Founded: August 18, 1981
- Ground: Estádio Bichinho Vieira, Quirinópolis, Goiás state, Brazil
- Capacity: 7,000
- President: Romisdete Neves
- Head Coach: Paulo Mendes
- League: Campeonato Goiano (Third Division) (2017)
Home colours	Away colours

Associação Esportiva Evangélica, better known simply as Evangélica or ASEEV, is a Brazilian football club in the city of Guapó, in the state of Goiás. Until 2018 it was in the city of Paraúna.

== History ==
Founded on August 18, 1981 in the city of Paraúna in the state of Goiás, the club is affiliated to Federação Goiana de Futebol and Currently, the club disputes Campeonato Goiano (Third Division). In 2018, the club moved to the city of Guapó.

== Titles ==
- Campeonato Goiano (Third Division) (2015)

== Players ==
=== Squad 2021 ===
As of 24 October 2021. Source: FGF

Note: Flags indicate national team as defined under FIFA eligibility rules; some limited exceptions apply. Players may hold more than one non-FIFA nationality.

No.	Pos.	Nation	Player
1	GK	(Brazil) BRA	Paulo Henrique Campos
2	RB	(Brazil) BRA	Eduardo de Sousa Ribeiro
3	DF	(Brazil) BRA	Luis Felipe Alves
4	DF	(Brazil) BRA	Joao Victor Bernardo
5	DF	(Brazil) BRA	Lucas Lorenzi dos Santos
6	LB	(Brazil) BRA	Alexander Freire dos Santos
7	FW	(Brazil) BRA	Igor Pereira Maia
8	MF	(Brazil) BRA	Paulo Cesar Oliveira
9	FW	(Brazil) BRA	Breno Ferreira Lima
10	FW	(Brazil) BRA	Irlan Jorge Lima dos Santos
11	FW	(Brazil) BRA	Jean Luiz Rosa Oliveira

No.	Pos.	Nation	Player
12	GK	(Brazil) BRA	Maike Antonio dos Santos
13	RB	(Brazil) BRA	Vinicius Barbosa
14	FW	(Brazil) BRA	Mamedio Francisco
15	DF	(Brazil) BRA	Luiz Felipe Pimentel Lopes
16	MF	(Brazil) BRA	Caio da Purificação
17	LB	(Brazil) BRA	Carlos Henrique Vieira
18	FW	(Brazil) BRA	Weslley Halan Pereira
