= Itaberaí Esporte Clube =

Football club in the Itaberaí, state of Goiás, Brazil

Itaberaí
- Full name: Itaberaí Esporte Clube
- Nickname(s): Touro Do Centro-Oeste Goiano
- Founded: July 5, 1955
- Stadium: Estádio Rio Das Pedras
- Capacity: 5,000
- President: Marcos Roberto Gundim
- League: Campeonato Goiano (Third Division) (2017)

Itaberaí Esporte Clube is a football club in the city of Itaberaí, in the state of Goiás wed already disputed the third division of Campeonato Goiano.

== History ==
Founded on July 5, 1955, in the city of Itaberaí in the state of Goiás, the club is affiliated to Federação Goiana de Futebol and has played in Campeonato Goiano (Second Division) three times and Campeonato Goiano (Third Division) two times.

== Titles ==
- Campeão Goiano 20144
