= Fernando Neto (footballer, born 1993) =

Brazilian footballer (born 1993)

Personal information
- Full name: Fernando José da Cunha Neto
- Date of birth: 27 January 1993 (age 33)
- Place of birth: São Domingos, Brazil
- Height: 1.79 m (5 ft 10 in)
- Position: Central midfielder

Team information
- Current team: São Bernardo

Youth career
- 2011: Vila Nova
- 2012: Fluminense

Senior career*
Years	Team	Apps	(Gls)
2012–2019	Fluminense	11	(0)
2013–2014	→ Paços Ferreira (loan)	12	(1)
2015	→ Macaé (loan)	21	(3)
2016	→ Vila Nova (loan)	16	(1)
2017	→ Santo André (loan)	13	(1)
2017–2018	→ STK Šamorín (loan)	29	(8)
2019	→ Paraná (loan)	36	(3)
2020–2021	Vitória	56	(4)
2022	Operário Ferroviário	28	(0)
2023–	São Bernardo	5	(0)
- * Club domestic league appearances and goals as of 00:03, 23 May 2023 (UTC)

Fernando José da Cunha Neto (born 27 January 1993), known as Fernando Neto, is a Brazilian professional footballer who plays for São Bernardo. Mainly a central midfielder, he can also play as a left-back.

== Career ==
In 2012, Fernando Neto was promoted to the first team of Fluminense. To get more matches, he spent the 2013–2014 on loan at Portuguese club Paços Ferreira. He made his professional debut against Vitória Guimarães.

== Involvement in match-fixing scandal ==
On 10 May 2023, after having his name included in the 2023 Brazilian football match-fixing scandal, Fernando Neto's contract with São Bernardo was suspended. On 1 June, he received a 380-day ban, aside from being charged a R$ 15,000 fine.
