= Santa Helena Esporte Clube =

Santa Helena
- Full name: Santa Helena Esporte Clube
- Nickname(s): SHEC; Fantasma do Sudoeste
- Founded: November 17, 1965; 59 years ago
- Ground: Estádio Pedro Romualdo Cabral, Santa Helena de Goiás, Goiás state, Brazil
- Capacity: 10,000
- President: Oberdan Francisco da Silva
- Head coach: Junior Pezao
- League: Campeonato Goiano 2nd Division
- 2017: Campeonato Goiano, 8th (relegated)
Home colors	Away colors

Santa Helena Esporte Clube, commonly known as Santa Helena, is a Brazilian football club based in Santa Helena de Goiás, Goiás state. They competed in the Copa do Brasil once.

== History ==
The club was founded on November 17, 1965. Santa Helena won the Campeonato Goiano Second Level in 1986, 2005, and in 2008 and the Campeonato Goiano Third Level in 2007. They competed in the Copa do Brasil in 2011, when they were eliminated in the First Round by Uberaba.

== Honours ==
- Campeonato Goiano
  - Runners-up (1): 2010
- Campeonato Goiano Second Division
  - Winners (3): 1986, 2005, 2008
- Campeonato Goiano Third Division
  - Winners (2): 2007, 2022
- Campeonato Goiano do Interior
  - Winners (1): 1987
- Torneio Início do Campeonato Goiano
  - Winners (1): 1973

== Stadium ==
Santa Helena Esporte Clube play their home games at Estádio Pedro Romualdo Cabral. The stadium has a maximum capacity of 10,000 people.
