= Associação Tupy de Esportes =

Football club in the Jussara, state of Goiás, Brazil

Tupy
- Full name: Associação Tupy de Esportes
- Founded: November 20, 1963
- Ground: Geraldão, Jussara, Goiás state, Brazil
- President: Vismar Filho
- League: Campeonato Goiano (Third Division)
Home colours	Away colours

Associação Tupy de Esportes is a football club in the city of Jussara, in the state of Goiás that competes in the third division of Campeonato Goiano.

== History ==
Founded on November 20, 1963 in the city of Jussara in the state of Goiás, the club is affiliated to Federação Goiana de Futebol and has played in Campeonato Goiano (Second Division) three times and Third Division two times.
