= Atlético Clube Rioverdense =

Brazilian sports club in the state of Goiás

Atlético Rioverdense
- Full name: Atlético Clube Rioverdense
- Founded: June 13, 1984
- Ground: Velosão, Rio Verde, Goiás, Brazil
- Capacity: 8.740
- President: Reino Alves
- League: Goiano Third Division
| Home colours | Away colours |

Atlético Clube Rioverdense (Or simply Atlético Rioverdense) is a Brazilian sports club in the state of Goiás, more specifically in the city of Rio Verde.

== History ==
The club was founded on June 13, 1984, in the city of Rio Verde, in the state of Goiás.

In 2003, Atlético Rioverdense's team almost won the third division title of Campeonato Goiano, finishing as the runner-up.

In 2009, competing again in the third division of Goianão, the club had more luck and ended up winning its first title in professional football.

In 2019, the name of the club was highlighted, unfortunately in a negative way, when the club's athletes were prevented from leaving the hotel where they were staying for lack of payment.

After a few years on leave, the club returned to dispute the third division of Goianão in 2019, where they managed to qualify for the second phase (play-offs) and was eliminated by the Goiatuba team. With that, the Goiatuba team advanced to the next phase, eliminated the Tupy team, reached the final and won the title by beating the Inhumas team.

== Stadium ==
The club uses for their home games Estádio Mozart Veloso do Carmo, also called Velosão, that accommodates 8.740 people.

== Honors ==
=== Domestic competitions ===
- Campeonato Goiano (Third Division)

Winners (1): 2009
Runner-up (1): 2003
