= Esporte Clube Rio Verde =

Rio Verde
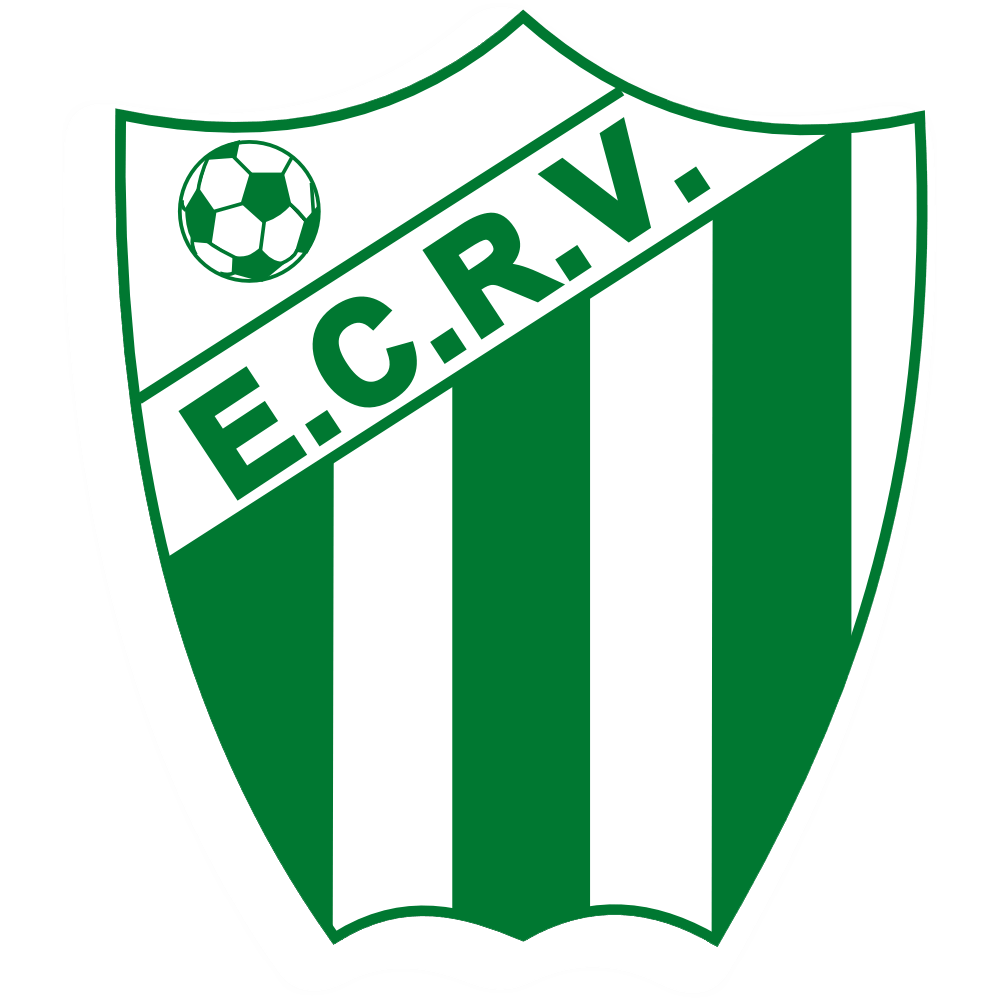
- Full name: Esporte Clube Rio Verde
- Nickname(s): Verdão
- Founded: August 22, 1963
- Ground: Estádio Mozart Veloso do Carmo, Rio Verde, Goiás state, Brazil
- Capacity: 8,000
- President: Wolnei Marques
- Head coach: Edson Porto
Home colors	Away colors

Esporte Clube Rio Verde, commonly known as Rio Verde, is a Brazilian football club based in Rio Verde, Goiás state.

== History ==
Esporte Clube Rio Verde was founded on August 22, 1963. The club won the Campeonato Goiano in 1969, 1982, 1989, and in 1993.

== Honours ==
- Campeonato Goiano Second Division
  - Winners (6): 1969, 1982, 1989, 1993, 2011, 2016
- Campeonato Goiano Third Division
  - Winners (1): 2024
- Torneio Incentivo
  - Winners (1): 1976

== Stadium ==
Esporte Clube Rio Verde play their home games at Estádio Mozart Veloso do Carmo. The stadium has a maximum capacity of 8,000 people.
