= Associação Atlética Aparecidense =

Brazilian association football club based in Aparecida de Goiânia, Goiás, Brazil

Aparecidense
- Full name: Associação Atlética Aparecidense
- Nickname: Camaleão (Chameleon)
- Founded: 22 October 1985; 41 years ago
- Ground: Annibal de Toledo
- Capacity: 5,000
- President: Elvis Carlos Mendes
- Head coach: Lúcio Flávio
- League: Campeonato Brasileiro Série D Campeonato Goiano
- 2025 2025: Série D, 9th of 20; Goiano, 10th of 12
- Website: http://aparecidense.com.br/
Home colours	Away colours

Associação Atlética Aparecidense, commonly referred to as Aparecidense, is a Brazilian professional club based in Aparecida de Goiânia, Goiás founded on 22 October 1985. It competes in the Campeonato Brasileiro Série D, the fourth tier of Brazilian football, as well as in the Campeonato Goiano, the top flight of the Goiás state football league.

== History ==
Aparecidense was founded on 22 October 1985. The club played their first professional competition in 1992, playing in the Campeonato Goiano Second Level. In 1995, after finishing second, they achieved promotion to the Campeonato Goiano.

After finishing in the 13th place in the 1997 Goiano, Aparecidense did not play in the 1998 Second Division, only returning in 1999. Despite finishing fifth and achieving promotion as eight teams were promoted, the club went into inactivity, only returning in 2002 but in the Campeonato Goiano Third Level, which they finished champions.

The club finished second in the 2004 Second Division, achieving promotion back to the top tier of the Goiano. They did not play in the 2007 Goiano, being immediately relegated and having their spot given to Canedense.

Back to action in 2008, Aparecidense immediately returned to the top tier after finishing second. Relegated after finishing last in the 2009 Goiano, the club won the Second Level in 2010 and returned to the first division.

The club first reached a national competition in 2012, when they played in the Campeonato Brasileiro Série D after Itumbiara withdrew from the competition. They made national and international headlines in September of the following year, in a Série D knockout match against Tupi, when club physiotherapist Ramildo De Silva entered the pitch to make a double save in the last minute, keeping the score at 2–2 so Aparecidense advanced on away goals. The club was knocked out of the competition as punishment.

Aparecidense reached the Campeonato Goiano finals in 2015, but lost the title to Goiás. From that year onwards, the club featured regularly in the Série D, and also knocked out Série A sides Sport Recife and Botafogo in the 2016 and 2018 editions of the Copa do Brasil. They again lost the title of the Goiano to Goiás in 2018.

On 16 October 2021, after a 2–1 aggregate win over Uberlândia, Aparecidense achieved a first-ever promotion to the Série C in their history.

== Honours ==
=== Official tournaments ===
National
Competitions	Titles	Seasons
Campeonato Brasileiro Série D	1	2021
State
Competitions	Titles	Seasons
Campeonato Goiano Second Division	1	2010
Campeonato Goiano Third Division	1	2002

=== Runners-up ===
- Campeonato Goiano (2): 2015, 2018
- Campeonato Goiano Second Division (3): 1995, 2004, 2008

== Stadium ==
Associação Atlética Aparecidense play their home games at Estádio Annibal Batista de Toledo. The stadium has a maximum capacity of 8,000 people.
