= Aparecida Esporte Clube =

Football club in Goiás, Brazil

Aparecida
- Full name: Aparecida Esporte Clube
- Founded: 1 January 1995; 31 years ago
- Ground: Estádio Annibal Batista de Toledo, Aparecida de Goiânia, Goiás state, Brazil
- Capacity: 5,000
- President: Gilberto Lopes Faria
- Head Coach: Rogério Mancini
- League: Campeonato Goiano (Second Division)
Home colours	Away colours

Aparecida Esporte Clube is a football club in the city of Aparecida de Goiânia, in the state of Goiás that competes in the second division of Campeonato Goiano.

== History ==
Founded on January 1, 1995 in the city of Aparecida de Goiânia in the state of Goiás, the club is affiliated to Federação Goiana de Futebol and has played in Campeonato Goiano (First Division) one time, Campeonato Goiano (Second Division) six times and Campeonato Goiano (Third Division) ten times.

== Titles ==
- Campeonato Goiano Second Division: 1999
- Campeonato Goiano Third Division: 2016
