= Bom Jesus Esporte Clube =

Brazilian football club from Goiás

Bom Jesus
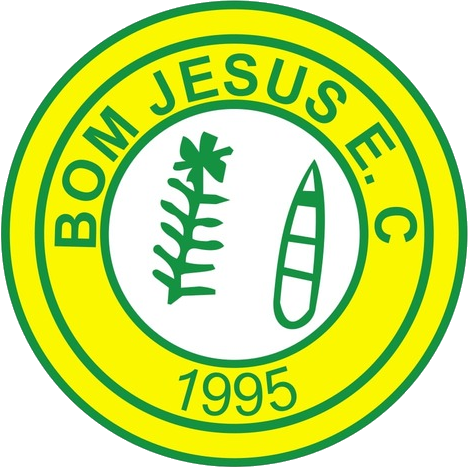
- Full name: Bom Jesus Esporte Clube
- Nickname: Leão do Sul (Lion of the Sul)
- Founded: March 20, 1995
- Ground: Estádio Gilmar Alves de Oliveira, Bom Jesus de Goiás
- Capacity: 3,500
- League: Campeonato Goiano Second Division
Home colours	Away colours

Bom Jesus Esporte Clube is a Brazilian football club from Bom Jesus de Goiás, Goiás. They were founded in 1995 and currently plays in the lower divisions of the Campeonato Goiano.

== History ==
The club's history has its origins in the early 1990s, where several cities had municipal teams to compete in regional championships, including Bom Jesus de Goiás. It was in 1995 that interest in professionalizing a team arose, especially thanks to the farmer Miron Borges de Castro, passionate about football, who joined with other sports enthusiasts and founded Bom Jesus Esporte Clube in March 20 of that year, starting at the second division.

Their first professional game was in October 1, against Uruaçu where they lost 1–0, however, they managed to be the champions, although with no promotion to the Campeonato Goiano. In 1996, they finally were granted promotion from which they played continuously from 1997 to 1999, when their first relegation occurred. After playing the second division in 2000 and 2001, they stopped playing at professional level. The return only happened in 2015, at the third division, where after another hiatus from 2016 to 2024, came back again for 2025.

== Honours ==
- Campeonato Goiano Second Division
  - Winners (1): 1995
- Campeonato Goiano Third Division
  - Winners (1): 2025
